= 2008 Speedway Grand Prix of Germany =

- FIM Final Speedway Grand Prix

Information
- Date: 18 October 2008
- City: (Germany) Gelsenkirchen (Poland) Bydgoszcz
- Event: 11 of 11 (111)
- Referee: (United Kingdom) Anthony Steele
- Jury President: (Denmark) Jørgen L. Jensen

Stadium details
- Stadium: Veltins-Arena; Polonia Stadium
- Capacity: 20,000
- Length: 348 m (381 yd)
- Track: temporary (Gelsenkirchen) speedway track (Bydgoszcz)

SGP Results
- Best Time: (Australia) Leigh Adams; 60.44 secs (in Heat 1)
- (gold) Winner: (Poland) Tomasz Gollob
- (silver) Runner-up: (Denmark) Hans N. Andersen
- (bronze) 3rd place: (United States) Greg Hancock

The 2008 Speedway Grand Prix of Germany was the eleventh and closing race of the 2008 Speedway Grand Prix season. It was scheduled to take place on 11 October 2008, in the Veltins-Arena in Gelsenkirchen, Germany. However, the meeting was cancelled because the track (temporary) was deemed unsafe by the Fédération Internationale de Motocyclisme (FIM) jury due to adverse weather conditions. The event was re-staged at the Polonia Stadium, Bydgoszcz, Poland, on the 18 October and was renamed the 2008 FIM Final Speedway Grand Prix. The Grand Prix was won by Polish rider Tomasz Gollob, who also won the 2008 Super Prix.

== Riders ==
The Speedway Grand Prix Commission nominated Martin Smolinski as a wild card, and Tobias Kroner and Max Dilger both as track reserves. Kevin Wölbert later replaced the injured Max Dilger. The draw was made on 29 September at the FIM Headquarters in Mies, Switzerland. The SGP Commission re-nominated Maciej Janowski and Grzegorz Zengota both as track reserves. Track reserve Janowski later replaced the injured Niels Kristian Iversen.

- Draw Nr 17 change: (Germany) (17) Tobias Kroner → (Poland) (17) Maciej Janowski
- Draw Nr 18 changes: (Germany) (18) Max Dilger → (Germany) (18) Kevin Wölbert → (Poland) (18) Grzegorz Zengota

== Heat details ==
Placing	Draw	Rider	Total	1	2	3	4	5	6	7	8	9	10	11	12	13	14	15	16	17	18	19	20	Pts	Pos	21	22	23
1	4	(Poland) (4) Tomasz Gollob	21	E4							3				3				3				3	12	2		3	3
2	5	(Denmark) (5) Hans N. Andersen	17		2			2					2					3					1	10	6	3		2
3	13	(United States) (6) Greg Hancock	15				2	3							0		3					3		11	5		2	1
4	2	(Australia) (2) Leigh Adams	15	3					3				3				2				2			13	1	2		0
5	7	(Denmark) (1) Nicki Pedersen	13		3					3					1	2					3			12	4	1
6	14	(Sweden) (10) Andreas Jonsson	12				3		1					3		3							2	12	3		X
7	1	(Sweden) (15) Fredrik Lindgren	9	2				1				2				1				2				8	8		1
8	10	(Czech Republic) (13) Lukáš Dryml	8			2			0						2			1		3				8	7	0
9	9	(Australia) (3) Jason Crump	7			3		0						2					1		1			7	9
10	3	(Poland) (7) Rune Holta	7	1						2				T/-				2				2		7	10
11	6	(United Kingdom) (8) Scott Nicholls	7		1				2			1							2			1		7	11
12	8	(Poland) (14) Krzysztof Kasprzak	5		0						2			1			1			1				5	12
13	11	(United Kingdom) (9) Chris Harris	4			1				0		3					0						0	4	13
14	15	(Denmark) (11) Bjarne Pedersen	3				1			1			1						0	0				3	14
15	17	(Poland) (17) Maciej Janowski	1				0				1	0						0			0			1	15
16	12	(Germany) (16) Martin Smolinski	0			0					0		0			0						0		0	16
17	18	(Poland) (18) Grzegorz Zengota	0											0										0	17
	16	(Denmark) (12) Niels Kristian Iversen	-																					-
Placing	Draw	Rider	Total	1	2	3	4	5	6	7	8	9	10	11	12	13	14	15	16	17	18	19	20	Pts	Pos	21	22	23

e: retired or mechanical failure • m: exclusion for exceeding two minute time allowance • t: exclusion for touching the tapes • x: other exclusion • f: fell
ns: non-starter • nc: non-classify
Semi-finals: Heat 21: Riders placed 1st, 4th, 6th & 7th in the intermediate classification (after 20 heats)
Heat 22: Riders placed 2nd, 3rd, 5th & 8th in the intermediate classification (after 20 heats)
Big Final (heat 23): The first and second placed riders in each of the Semi-Finals

gate A – inside	gate B	gate C	gate D – outside

=== Heat after heat ===
1. (60,44) Adams, Lindgren, Holta, Gollob (E4)
2. (61,22) N.Pedersen, Andersen, Nicholls, Kasprzak
3. (61,66) Crump, Dryml, Harris, Smolinski
4. (61,69) Jonsson, Hancock, B.Pedersen, Janowski
5. (61,91) Hancock, Andersen, Lindgren, Crump
6. (62,22) Adams, Nicholls, Jonsson, Dryml
7. (62,25) N.Pedersen, Holta, B.Pedersen, Harris
8. (62,82) Gollob, Kasprzak, Janowski, Smolinski
9. (63,91) Harris, Lindgren, Nicholls, Janowski
10. (62,68) Adams, Andersen, B.Pedersen, Smolinski
11. (62,78) Jonsson, Crump, Kasprzak, Zengota, Holta (T)
12. (63,62) Gollob, Dryml, N.Pedersen, Hancock
13. (62,88) Jonsson, N.Pedersen, Lindgren, Smolinski
14. (63,12) Hancock, Adams, Kasprzak, Harris
15. (63,75) Andersen, Holta, Dryml, Janowski
16. (63,48) Gollob, Nicholls, Crump, B.Pedersen
17. (64,44) Dryml, Lindgren, Kasprzak, B.Pedersen
18. (63,79) N.Pedersen, Adams, Crump, Janowski
19. (63,88) Hancock, Holta, Nicholls, Smolinski
20. (64,37) Gollob, Jonsson, Andersen, Harris
  Semi-Finals:
21. (64,27) Andersen, Adams, N.Pedersen, Dryml
22. (64,25) Gollob, Hancock, Lindgren, Jonsson (X)
  The Final:
23. (64,00) Gollob, Andersen, Hancock, Adams
  SuperPrix Final:
24. (63,98) Gollob, Crump, Holta, N.Pedersen (T)

== Super Prix ==
For the Super Prix Final the $200,000 prize fund will be awarded as follows:

1. $120,000
2. $40,000
3. $25,000
4. $15,000

If a Super Prix event is won by a rider who has already qualified for the Super Prix Final, then the World Championship Final Classification following the completion of Heat 23 in Germany will determine who is awarded this place or places.

At the Super Prix Final in Germany, if a rider has won more than one Super Prix he will take the starting gate colour of his first Super Prix win. e.g. If he has won in Sweden (red) and Denmark (blue), the rider will have the red starting gate.

If qualified riders are unable to participate in the Super Prix Final due to injury or other circumstances, they will be replaced using the World Championship Final Classification.

A Wild Card or Reserve rider could qualify to the Super Prix Final in Germany.

It is the placing in the Final of a Super Prix which determines who qualifies, not points.

Gate	Rider	Note
A	(Poland) POL Rune Holta	Swedish SGP Winner
B	(Poland) POL Tomasz Gollob	Danish SGP Winner (Final SGP Winner also)
C	(Australia) AUS Jason Crump	British SGP Winner
D	(Denmark) DEN Nicki Pedersen	~~Final SGP Winner~~; Top rider in World Championship Final Classification

== The Final Classification ==
Qualifies for next season's Grand Prix series
Full-time Grand Prix rider
Wild card, track reserve or qualified reserve

Pos.	Rider	Points	SVN (Slovenia)	EUR (Poland)	SWE (Sweden)	DEN (Denmark)	GBR (United Kingdom)	CZE (Czech Republic)	SCA (Sweden)	LAT (Latvia)	POL (Poland)	ITA (Italy)	GER (Germany)
Gold	(Denmark) (1) Nicki Pedersen	174	17	16	16	20	11	22	14	18	21	6	13
Silver	(Australia) (3) Jason Crump	152	10	8	12	18	22	17	12	19	9	18	7
Bronze	(Poland) (4) Tomasz Gollob	148	19	12	8	19	4	12	8	16	20	9	21
4	(United States) (6) Greg Hancock	144	8	20	6	10	20	13	12	13	18	9	15
5	(Denmark) (5) Hans N. Andersen	139	14	6	8	11	9	16	20	7	10	21	17
6	(Australia) (2) Leigh Adams	125	5	20	9	8	7	10	21	9	9	12	15
7	(Sweden) (10) Andreas Jonsson	100	12	9	8	9	8	9	6	10	8	9	12
8	(Poland) (7) Rune Holta	80	5	4	17	7	6	9	5	4	6	10	7
9	(United Kingdom) (8) Scott Nicholls	77	7	2	7	7	12	6	4	7	10	8	7
10	(Sweden) (15) Fredrik Lindgren	73	7	7	22	3	2	4	7	7	0	5	9
11	(Denmark) (11) Bjarne Pedersen	69	4	–	–	7	14	7	6	7	4	17	3
12	(Denmark) (12) Niels Kristian Iversen	59	8	10	2	6	6	7	9	1	4	6	ns
13	(United Kingdom) (9) Chris Harris	58	6	6	5	3	10	7	3	9	5	ns	4
14	(Poland) (14) Krzysztof Kasprzak	57	6	3	5	3	4	1	9	7	6	8	5
15	(Czech Republic) (13) Lukáš Dryml	47	9	2	3	1	1	4	5	7	3	4	8
16	(Poland) (16) Jarosław Hampel	16	–	16	–	–	–	–	–	–	–	–	–
17	(Denmark) (16) Kenneth Bjerre	11	–	–	–	11	–	–	–	–	–	–	–
18	(Poland) (16) Wiesław Jaguś	9	–	–	–	–	–	–	–	–	9	–	–
19	(Czech Republic) (16) (19) Luboš Tomíček, Jr.	8	–	3	5	–	–	0	–	–	–	–	–
20	(Slovenia) (16) Matej Žagar	7	7	–	–	–	–	–	–	–	–	–	–
21	(Sweden) (16) (17) Jonas Davidsson	7	–	–	7	–	–	–	ns	–	–	–	–
22	(United Kingdom) (16) Edward Kennett	4	–	–	–	–	4	–	–	–	–	–	–
23	(Sweden) (16) Peter Ljung	3	–	–	–	–	–	–	3	–	–	–	–
24	(Latvia) (16) Grigory Laguta	2	–	–	–	–	–	–	–	2	–	–	–
25	(Italy) (17) Mattia Carpanese	2	–	–	–	–	–	–	–	–	–	2	–
26	(Sweden) (18) Billy Forsberg	2	–	–	2	–	–	–	–	–	–	–	–
27	(Denmark) (17) Nicolai Klindt	1	–	–	–	1	–	–	–	–	–	–	–
28	(Poland) (17) (18) Krzysztof Buczkowski	1	–	ns	–	–	–	–	–	–	1	–	–
29	(Poland) (17) (18) Maciej Janowski	1	–	–	–	–	–	–	–	–	ns	–	1
30	(Italy) (16) Guglielmo Franchetti	0	–	–	–	–	–	–	–	–	–	0	–
31	(Germany) (16) Martin Smolinski	0	–	–	–	–	–	–	–	–	–	–	0
32	(Sweden) (17) Sebastian Aldén	0	–	–	0	–	–	–	–	–	–	–	–
33	(Latvia) (17) Maksims Bogdanovs	0	–	–	–	–	–	–	–	0	–	–	–
34	(Italy) (18) Alessandro Milanese	0	–	–	–	–	–	–	–	–	–	0	–
35	(Poland) (18) Grzegorz Zengota	0	–	–	–	–	–	–	–	–	–	–	0
Rider(s) not classified
	(Slovenia) (17) Izak Šantej	—	ns	–	–	–	–	–	–	–	–	–	–
	(Poland) (17) Damian Baliński	—	–	ns	–	–	–	–	–	–	–	–	–
	(United Kingdom) (17) Tai Woffinden	—	–	–	–	–	ns	–	–	–	–	–	–
	(Czech Republic) (17) Adrian Rymel	—	–	–	–	–	–	ns	–	–	–	–	–
	(Slovenia) (18) Denis Štojs	—	ns	–	–	–	–	–	–	–	–	–	–
	(Denmark) (18) Patrick Hougaard	—	–	–	–	ns	–	–	–	–	–	–	–
	(United Kingdom) (18) Simon Stead	—	–	–	–	–	ns	–	–	–	–	–	–
	(Czech Republic) (18) Filip Šitera	—	–	–	–	–	–	ns	–	–	–	–	–
	(Sweden) (18) Thomas H. Jonasson	—	–	–	–	–	–	–	ns	–	–	–	–
	(Latvia) (18) Kasts Poudzuks	—	–	–	–	–	–	–	–	ns	–	–	–
Pos.	Rider	Points	SVN (Slovenia)	EUR (Poland)	SWE (Sweden)	DEN (Denmark)	GBR (United Kingdom)	CZE (Czech Republic)	SCA (Sweden)	LAT (Latvia)	POL (Poland)	ITA (Italy)	GER (Germany)

== See also ==
- Speedway Grand Prix
- List of Speedway Grand Prix riders
