= 2008 Speedway Grand Prix of Denmark =

Speedway event in Copenhagen

- FIM Dansk Metal Danish Speedway Grand Prix

Information
- Date: 14 June 2008
- City: (Denmark) Copenhagen
- Event: 4 of 11 (104)
- Referee: (Poland) Wojciech Grodzki
- Jury President: (Germany) Wolfgang Glas

Stadium details
- Stadium: Parken Stadium
- Capacity: 32,500
- Length: 275 m (301 yd)
- Track: Temporary

SGP Results
- Attendance: 29,000
- Best Time
- (gold) Winner: (Poland) Tomasz Gollob
- (silver) Runner-up: (Denmark) Nicki Pedersen
- (bronze) 3rd place: (Australia) Jason Crump

The 2008 Speedway Grand Prix of Denmark will be the fourth race of the 2008 Speedway Grand Prix season. It took place on 14 June in the Parken Stadium in Copenhagen, Denmark.

Copenhagen is also the second of four rounds of the 2008 Super Prix. The meeting winner will be given the blue helmet in the Super Prix Final at Gelsenkirchen in October with a chance of winning a share of an extra $200,000 prize fund.

== Riders ==
The Speedway Grand Prix Commission nominated Kenneth Bjerre as a wild card, and Nicolai Klindt and Patrick Hougaard both as track reserves. The draw was made on 2 June at the FIM Headquarters in Mies, Switzerland.

== Result ==
Tomasz Gollob was the winner at Parken and became the first rider to win two Grand Prix rounds in 2008. He won the final from Nicki Pedersen, Jason Crump and Hans N. Andersen. The result kept Nicki Pedersen at the top of the World Championship standings, eleven points ahead of nearest rival Gollob. Danish wild card entry Kenneth Bjerre reached the semi-finals and finished in fifth position.

== Heat details ==
Placing	Draw	Rider	Total	1	2	3	4	5	6	7	8	9	10	11	12	13	14	15	16	17	18	19	20	Pts	Pos	21	22	23
1	12	(Poland) (4) Tomasz Gollob	19			2					2		3			1						2		10	4	3		3
2	13	(Denmark) (1) Nicki Pedersen	20				3	3							3		2					3		14	1	2		2
3	8	(Australia) (3) Jason Crump	18		1						3			3			3			3				13	2		3	1
4	6	(Denmark) (5) Hans N. Andersen	11		3				1			2							3			0		9	5		2	0
5	7	(Denmark) (16) Kenneth Bjerre	11		2					3					0	3					3			11	3		0
6	2	(United States) (6) Greg Hancock	10	2					3				1				1				2			9	6	1
7	4	(Sweden) (10) Andreas Jonsson	9	3							1				2				2				0	8	8		1
8	11	(Australia) (2) Leigh Adams	8			3				2		0					0						3	8	7	0
9	1	(Denmark) (11) Bjarne Pedersen	7	1				2				3				0				1				7	9
10	10	(Poland) (7) Rune Holta	7			1			2						1			3		0				7	10
11	5	(United Kingdom) (8) Scott Nicholls	7		0			1					2					2					2	7	11
12	14	(Denmark) (12) Niels Kristian Iversen	6				1		0					2		2							1	6	12
13	16	(United Kingdom) (9) Chris Harris	3				2				0	1						0			0			3	13
14	15	(Poland) (14) Krzysztof Kasprzak	3				0			0			0						1	2				3	14
15	3	(Sweden) (15) Fredrik Lindgren	3	0						1				X				1				1		3	15
16	9	(Czech Republic) (13) Lukáš Dryml	1			0		0						M/-					0		1			1	16
17	17	(Denmark) (17) Nicolai Klindt	1											1										1	17
18	18	(Denmark) (18) Patrick Hougaard	-																					-	18
Placing	Draw	Rider	Total	1	2	3	4	5	6	7	8	9	10	11	12	13	14	15	16	17	18	19	20	Pts	Pos	21	22	23

e: retired or mechanical failure • m: exclusion for exceeding two minute time allowance • t: exclusion for touching the tapes • x: other exclusion • f: fell
ns: non-starter • nc: non-classify
Semi-finals: Heat 21: Riders placed 1st, 4th, 6th & 7th in the intermediate classification (after 20 heats)
Heat 22: Riders placed 2nd, 3rd, 5th & 8th in the intermediate classification (after 20 heats)
Big Final (heat 23): The first and second placed riders in each of the Semi-Finals

gate A – inside	gate B	gate C	gate D – outside

=== Heat after heat ===
1. Jonsson, Hancock, B.Pedersen, Lindgren
2. Andersen, Bjerre, Crump, Nicholls
3. Adams, Gollob, Holta, Dryml
4. N.Pedersen, Harris, Iversen, Kasprzak
5. N.Pedersen, B.Pedersen, Nicholls, Dryml
6. Hancock, Holta, Andersen, Iversen
7. Bjerre, Adams, Lindgren, Kasprzak
8. Crump, Gollob, Jonsson, Harris
9. B.Pedersen, Andersen, Harris, Adams
10. Gollob, Nicholls, Hancock, Kasprzak
11. Crump, Iversen, Klindt, Dryml (M/-), Lindgren (X/F2)
  Drryml collides with Lindgren in spectacular crash. Lindgren excluded for restart. Dryml's bike fails to start before end of time limit, he is excluded. replaced by Nicolai Klindt.
12. N.Pedersen, Jonsson, Holta, Bjerre
13. Bjerre, Iversen, Gollob, B.Pedersen
14. Crump, N.Pedersen, Hancock, Adams
15. Holta, Nicholls, Lindgren, Harris
16. Andersen, Jonsson, Kasprzak, Dryml
17. Crump, Kasprzak, B.Pedersen, Holta
18. Bjerre, Hancock, Dryml, Harris
19. N.Pedersen, Gollob, Lindgren, Andersen
20. Adams, Nicholls, Iversen, Jonsson
  Semi-finals:
21. Gollob, N.Pedersen, Hancock, Adams
22. Crump, Andersen, Jonsson, Bjerre
  Final:
23. Gollob (6), N.Pedersen (4), Crump (2), Andersen (0)

== The intermediate classification ==
Qualifies for next season's Grand Prix series
Full-time Grand Prix rider
Wild card, track reserve or qualified reserve

Pos.	Rider	Points	SVN (Slovenia)	EUR (Poland)	SWE (Sweden)	DEN (Denmark)	GBR (United Kingdom)	CZE (Czech Republic)	SCA (Sweden)	LAT (Latvia)	POL (Poland)	ITA (Italy)	FIN (Poland)
1	(Denmark) (1) Nicki Pedersen	69	17	16	16	20							
2	(Poland) (4) Tomasz Gollob	58	19	12	8	19							
3	(Australia) (3) Jason Crump	48	10	8	12	18							
4	(United States) (6) Greg Hancock	44	8	20	6	10							
5	(Australia) (2) Leigh Adams	42	5	20	9	8							
6	(Denmark) (5) Hans N. Andersen	39	14	6	8	11							
7	(Sweden) (15) Fredrik Lindgren	39	7	7	22	3							
8	(Sweden) (10) Andreas Jonsson	38	12	9	8	9							
9	(Poland) (7) Rune Holta	33	5	4	17	7							
10	(Denmark) (12) Niels Kristian Iversen	26	8	10	2	6							
11	(United Kingdom) (8) Scott Nicholls	23	7	2	7	7							
12	(United Kingdom) (9) Chris Harris	20	6	6	5	3							
13	(Poland) (14) Krzysztof Kasprzak	17	6	3	5	3							
14	(Poland) (16) Jarosław Hampel	16	–	16	–	–							
15	(Czech Republic) (13) Lukáš Dryml	15	9	2	3	1							
16	(Denmark) (11) Bjarne Pedersen	11	4	–	–	7							
17	(Denmark) (16) Kenneth Bjerre	11	–	–	–	11							
18	(Czech Republic) (19) Luboš Tomíček, Jr.	8	–	3	5	–							
19	(Slovenia) (16) Matej Žagar	7	7	–	–	–							
20	(Sweden) (16) Jonas Davidsson	7	–	–	7	–							
21	(Sweden) (18) Billy Forsberg	2	–	–	2	–							
22	(Denmark) (17) Nicolai Klindt	1	–	–	–	1							
23	(Sweden) (17) Sebastian Aldén	0	–	–	0	–							
Rider(s) not classified
	(Slovenia) (17) Izak Šantej	—	ns	–	–	–							
	(Poland) (17) Damian Baliński	—	–	ns	–	–							
	(Slovenia) (18) Denis Štojs	—	ns	–	–	–							
	(Poland) (18) Krzysztof Buczkowski	—	–	ns	–	–							
	(Denmark) (18) Patrick Hougaard	—	–	–	–	ns							
Pos.	Rider	Points	SVN (Slovenia)	EUR (Poland)	SWE (Sweden)	DEN (Denmark)	GBR (United Kingdom)	CZE (Czech Republic)	SCA (Sweden)	LAT (Latvia)	POL (Poland)	ITA (Italy)	FIN (Poland)

== See also ==
- Speedway Grand Prix
- List of Speedway Grand Prix riders
