= 2008 Speedway Grand Prix of Sweden =

- FIM SAPA Swedish Speedway Grand Prix

Information
- Date: 24 May 2008
- City: (Sweden) Gothenburg
- Event: 3 of 11 (103)
- Referee: (United Kingdom) Anthony Steele
- Jury President: (Denmark) Joergen L. Jensen

Stadium details
- Stadium: Ullevi
- Capacity: 43,000
- Length: 416 m (455 yd)
- Track: speedway track

SGP Results
- Best Time
- (gold) Winner: (Poland) Rune Holta
- (silver) Runner-up: (Sweden) Fredrik Lindgren
- (bronze) 3rd place: (Denmark) Nicki Pederson

The 2008 Speedway Grand Prix of Sweden is the third race of the 2008 Speedway Grand Prix season. It took place on 24 May in the Ullevi Stadium in Gothenburg, Sweden It is the fourth time that the Ullevi Stadium has staged a GP, the last time being the 2004 Grand Prix of Scandinavia. At 416 metres, the semi-permanent track is the largest track on the 2008 Grand Prix calendar, and the longest ever used for a Grand Prix event.

Sweden is also the first of four rounds of the 2008 Super Prix. The meeting winner will be given the red helmet in the SuperPrix final at Gelsenkirchen in October with a chance of winning a share of an extra $200,000 prize fund.

== Riders ==
The Speedway Grand Prix Commission nominated Jonas Davidsson as a wild card, and Sebastian Aldén and Billy Forsberg both as track reserves. Bjarne Pedersen was again replaced by Luboš Tomíček because of an injury. The draw was made on 13 May at the FIM Headquarters in Mies, Switzerland.

- Draw No 13: (Denmark) (11) Bjarne Pedersen → (Czech Republic) (19) Luboš Tomíček, Jr.

== Result ==
Rune Holta won the Swedish Grand Prix with a fast overtaking manoeuvre on the back straight on the first lap of the final. It was Holta's 50th Grand Prix and the first Grand Prix win of his career.

Fredrik Lindgren had been unbeaten from his previous races but had to settle for second place, although he did score the most points from the meeting. Nicki Pedersen extended his series lead to ten points with third place.

The meeting overran by over an hour due to a number of stoppages caused by the unpredictable, rutted track. Andreas Jonsson was taken to hospital after a high-speed crash but escaped serious injury, Niels Kristian Iversen also crashed in one of his heats and suffered a dislocated shoulder.

== Heat details ==
Placing	Draw	Rider	Total	1	2	3	4	5	6	7	8	9	10	11	12	13	14	15	16	17	18	19	20	Pts	Pos	21	22	23
1	5	(Poland) (7) Rune Holta	17		3			1					2					0					3	9	4	2		3
2	15	(Sweden) (15) Fredrik Lindgren	22				3			3			3						3	3				15	1	3		2
3	7	(Denmark) (1) Nicki Pedersen	16		2					1					3	3					2			11	2		3	1
4	1	(Australia) (3) Jason Crump	12	3				3				1				2				1				10	3		2	0
5	6	(Poland) (4) Tomasz Gollob	8		0				2			3							Fx			3		8	5		0
6	3	(Sweden) (10) Andreas Jonsson	8	2						2				1				3				Fx		8	7	N
7	16	(Australia) (2) Leigh Adams	9				2				1	2						2			1			8	6	1
8	8	(Denmark) (5) Hans N. Andersen	8		1						3			3			F2			0				7	8		1
9	4	(United Kingdom) (8) Scott Nicholls	7	1							2				2				Fx				2	7	9
10	10	(Sweden) (16) Jonas Davidsson	7			E			3						1			1		2				7	10
11	11	(United States) (6) Greg Hancock	6			3				0		0					3						Fx	6	11
12	2	(Poland) (14) Krzysztof Kasprzak	5	0					0				0				2				3			5	12
13	13	(Czech Republic) (19) Luboš Tomíček, Jr.	5				0	2							0		1					2		5	13
14	14	(United Kingdom) (9) Chris Harris	5				1		1					2		0							1	5	14
15	12	(Czech Republic) (13) Lukáš Dryml	3			1					0		1			1						Fx		3	15
16	9	(Denmark) (12) Niels Kristian Iversen	2			2		Fx						-					-		-			2	16
17	18	(Sweden) (18) Billy Forsberg	2																2					2	17
18	17	(Sweden) (17) Sebastian Aldén	0											0							0			0	18
Placing	Draw	Rider	Total	1	2	3	4	5	6	7	8	9	10	11	12	13	14	15	16	17	18	19	20	Pts	Pos	21	22	23

e: retired or mechanical failure • m: exclusion for exceeding two minute time allowance • t: exclusion for touching the tapes • x: other exclusion • f: fell
ns: non-starter • nc: non-classify
Semi-finals: Heat 21: Riders placed 1st, 4th, 6th & 7th in the intermediate classification (after 20 heats)
Heat 22: Riders placed 2nd, 3rd, 5th & 8th in the intermediate classification (after 20 heats)
Big Final (heat 23): The first and second placed riders in each of the Semi-Finals

gate A – inside	gate B	gate C	gate D – outside

=== Heat after heat ===
1. Crump, Jonsson, Nicholls, Kasprzak
2. Holta, Pedersen, Andersen, Gollob
3. Hancock, Iversen, Dryml, Davidsson (E/start)
4. Lindgren, Adams, Harris, Tomicek
5. Crump, Tomicek, Holta, Iversen (X/F2)
6. Davidsson, Gollob, Harris, Kasprzak
7. Lindgren, Jonsson, Pedersen, Hancock
8. Andersen, Nicholls, Adams, Dryml
9. Gollob, Adams, Crump, Hancock
10. Lindgren, Holta, Dryml, Kasprzak
11. Andersen, Harris, Jonsson, Alden
12. Pedersen, Nicholls, Davidsson, Tomicek
13. Pedersen, Crump, Dryml, Harris
14. Hancock, Kasprzak, Tomicek, Andersen (F2)
15. Jonsson, Adams, Davidsson, Holta
16. Lindgren, Forsberg, Nicholls (X/F3), Gollob (X/F2)
17. Lindgren, Davidsson, Crump, Andersen
18. Kasprzak, Pedersen, Adams, Alden
19. Gollob, Tomicek, Jonsson (X/F5), Dryml (X/F3)
20. Holta, Nicholls, Harris, Hancock (X/F2)
  Semi-Finals:
21. Lindgren, Holta, Adams, Jonsson (N)
22. Pedersen, Crump, Andersen, Gollob
  Final:
23. Holta (6), Lindgren (4), Pedersen (2), Crump (0)

== The intermediate classification ==
Qualifies for next season's Grand Prix series
Full-time Grand Prix rider
Wild card, track reserve or qualified reserve

Pos.	Rider	Points	SVN (Slovenia)	EUR (Poland)	SWE (Sweden)	DEN (Denmark)	GBR (United Kingdom)	CZE (Czech Republic)	SCA (Sweden)	LAT (Latvia)	POL (Poland)	ITA (Italy)	FIN (Poland)
1	(Denmark) (1) Nicki Pedersen	49	17	16	16								
2	(Poland) (4) Tomasz Gollob	39	19	12	8								
3	(Sweden) (15) Fredrik Lindgren	36	7	7	22								
4	(Australia) (2) Leigh Adams	34	5	20	9								
5	(United States) (6) Greg Hancock	34	8	20	6								
6	(Australia) (3) Jason Crump	30	10	8	12								
7	(Sweden) (10) Andreas Jonsson	29	12	9	8								
8	(Denmark) (5) Hans N. Andersen	28	14	6	8								
9	(Poland) (7) Rune Holta	26	5	4	17								
10	(Denmark) (12) Niels Kristian Iversen	20	8	10	2								
11	(United Kingdom) (9) Chris Harris	17	6	6	5								
12	(United Kingdom) (8) Scott Nicholls	16	7	2	7								
13	(Poland) (16) Jarosław Hampel	16	–	16	–								
14	(Czech Republic) (13) Lukáš Dryml	14	9	2	3								
15	(Poland) (14) Krzysztof Kasprzak	14	6	3	5								
16	(Czech Republic) (19) Luboš Tomíček, Jr.	8	–	3	5								
17	(Slovenia) (16) Matej Žagar	7	7	–	–								
18	(Sweden) (16) Jonas Davidsson	7	–	–	7								
19	(Denmark) (11) Bjarne Pedersen	4	4	–	–								
20	(Sweden) (18) Billy Forsberg	2	–	–	2								
21	(Sweden) (17) Sebastian Aldén	0	–	–	0								
Rider(s) not classified
	(Slovenia) (17) Izak Šantej	—	ns	–	–								
	(Poland) (17) Damian Baliński	—	–	ns	–								
	(Slovenia) (18) Denis Štojs	—	ns	–	–								
	(Poland) (18) Krzysztof Buczkowski	—	–	ns	–								
Pos.	Rider	Points	SVN (Slovenia)	EUR (Poland)	SWE (Sweden)	DEN (Denmark)	GBR (United Kingdom)	CZE (Czech Republic)	SCA (Sweden)	LAT (Latvia)	POL (Poland)	ITA (Italy)	FIN (Poland)

== See also ==
- Speedway Grand Prix
- List of Speedway Grand Prix riders
