= 2008 Speedway Grand Prix of Italy =

- FIM Meridian Lifts Italian Speedway Grand Prix

Information
- Date: 27 September 2008
- City: (Italy) Lonigo
- Event: 10 of 11 (110)
- Referee: (Poland) Wojciech Grodzki
- Jury President: (Finland) Ilkka Teromaa

Stadium details
- Stadium: Santa Marina Stadium
- Capacity: 8,000
- Length: 334 m (365 yd)
- Track: speedway track

SGP Results
- Best Time
- (gold) Winner: (Denmark) Hans N. Andersen
- (silver) Runner-up: (Denmark) Bjarne Pedersen
- (bronze) 3rd place: (Australia) Jason Crump

The 2008 Speedway Grand Prix of Italy was the tenth race of the 2008 Speedway Grand Prix season. It took place on September 27 in the Santa Marina Stadium in Lonigo, Italy. Italian SGP was won by Hans N. Andersen from Denmark. It was his first GP Won in this season.

== Riders ==
The Speedway Grand Prix Commission nominated Guglielmo Franchetti as a wild card, and Mattia Carpanese and Alessandro Milanese as track reserves. The draw was made on September 16 at the Fédération Internationale de Motocyclisme Headquarters in Mies, Switzerland.

== Heat details ==
Placing	Draw	Rider	Total	1	2	3	4	5	6	7	8	9	10	11	12	13	14	15	16	17	18	19	20	Pts	Pos	21	22	23
1	16	(Denmark) (5) Hans N. Andersen	21				3				2	3						2			2			12	2		3	3
2	5	(Denmark) (11) Bjarne Pedersen	17		3			0					2					3					3	11	3		2	2
3	12	(Australia) (3) Jason Crump	18			3					3		3			2						2		13	1	3		1
4	9	(Australia) (2) Leigh Adams	12			1		2						1					3		3			10	4	2		0
5	13	(Poland) (7) Rune Holta	10				2	3							2		1					1		9	6	1
6	7	(Sweden) (10) Andreas Jonsson	9		2					0					3	3					1			9	5		0
7	2	(United States) (6) Greg Hancock	9	1					3				1				3				0			8	8		1
8	10	(Poland) (4) Tomasz Gollob	9			2			2						1			1		3				9	7	X
9	3	(Poland) (14) Krzysztof Kasprzak	8	2						1				2				0				3		8	9
10	11	(United Kingdom) (8) Scott Nicholls	8			T/-				3		1					2						2	8	10
11	8	(Denmark) (1) Nicki Pedersen	6		1						F2x			3			0			2				6	11
12	1	(Denmark) (12) Niels Kristian Iversen	6	3				1				0				1				1				6	12
13	6	(Sweden) (15) Fredrik Lindgren	5		X				1			2							2			0		5	13
14	15	(Czech Republic) (13) Lukáš Dryml	4				1			2			0						1	0				4	14
15	17	(Italy) (17) Mattia Carpanese	2	0							1				0				0				1	2	15
16	14	(Italy) (16) Guglielmo Franchetti	0				0		0					0		0							0	0	16
17	18	(Italy) (18) Alessandro Milanese	0			0																		0	17
	4	(United Kingdom) (9) Chris Harris	-																					-
Placing	Draw	Rider	Total	1	2	3	4	5	6	7	8	9	10	11	12	13	14	15	16	17	18	19	20	Pts	Pos	21	22	23

e: retired or mechanical failure • m: exclusion for exceeding two minute time allowance • t: exclusion for touching the tapes • x: other exclusion • f: fell
ns: non-starter • nc: non-classify
Semi-finals: Heat 21: Riders placed 1st, 4th, 6th & 7th in the intermediate classification (after 20 heats)
Heat 22: Riders placed 2nd, 3rd, 5th & 8th in the intermediate classification (after 20 heats)
Big Final (heat 23): The first and second placed riders in each of the Semi-Finals

gate A – inside	gate B	gate C	gate D – outside

=== Heat by heat ===
1. Iversen, Kasprzak, Hancock, Carpanese
  Reserve rider Carpanese replaces injured Harris and comes.
2. B.Pedersen, Jonsson, N.Pedersen, Lindgren (Fx)
3. Crump, Gollob, Adams, Milanese, Nicholls (T/-)
  Nicholls touching the tapes and was excluded and replaced by Milanese.
4. Andersen, Holta, Dryml, Franchetti
5. Holta, Adams, Iversen, B.Pedersen
6. Hancock, Gollob, Lindgren, Franchetti
7. Nicholls, Dryml, Kasprzak, Jonsson
8. Crump, Andersen, Carpanese, N.Pedersen (F2x)
  Pedersen crashes and is excluded. Carpanese takes a point despite broken chain.
9. Andersen, Lindgren, Nicholls, Iversen
10. Crump, B.Pedersen, Hancock, Dryml
11. N.Pedersen, Kasprzak, Adams, Franchetti
12. Jonsson, Holta, Gollob, Carpanese
13. Jonsson, Crump, Iversen, Franchetti
14. Hancock, Nicholls, Holta, N.Pedersen
15. B.Pedersen, Andersen, Gollob, Kasprzak
16. Adams, Lindgren, Dryml, Carpanese
17. Gollob, N.Pedersen, Iversen, Dryml
18. Adams, Andersen, Jonsson, Hancock
19. Kasprzak, Crump, Holta, Lindgren
20. B.Pedersen, Nicholls, Carpanese, Franchetti
  Semi-Finals:
21. Crump, Adams, Holta, Gollob (X)
  Race stopped due to collision between Crump & Gollob - Gollob excluded
22. Andersen, B.Pedersen, Hancock, Jonsson
  The Final:
23. Andersen (6 points), B.Pedersen (4), Crump (2), Adams (0)

== The intermediate classification ==
Qualifies for next season's Grand Prix series
Full-time Grand Prix rider
Wild card, track reserve or qualified reserve

Pos.	Rider	Points	SVN (Slovenia)	EUR (Poland)	SWE (Sweden)	DEN (Denmark)	GBR (United Kingdom)	CZE (Czech Republic)	SCA (Sweden)	LAT (Latvia)	POL (Poland)	ITA (Italy)	FIN (Poland)
1	(Denmark) (1) Nicki Pedersen	161	17	16	16	20	11	22	14	18	21	6	
2	(Australia) (3) Jason Crump	145	10	8	12	18	22	17	12	19	9	18	
3	(United States) (6) Greg Hancock	129	8	20	6	10	20	13	12	13	18	9	
4	(Poland) (4) Tomasz Gollob	127	19	12	8	19	4	12	8	16	20	9	
5	(Denmark) (5) Hans N. Andersen	122	14	6	8	11	9	16	20	7	10	21	
6	(Australia) (2) Leigh Adams	110	5	20	9	8	7	10	21	9	9	12	
7	(Sweden) (10) Andreas Jonsson	88	12	9	8	9	8	9	6	10	8	9	
8	(Poland) (7) Rune Holta	73	5	4	17	7	6	9	5	4	6	10	
9	(United Kingdom) (8) Scott Nicholls	70	7	2	7	7	12	6	4	7	10	8	
10	(Denmark) (11) Bjarne Pedersen	66	4	–	–	7	14	7	6	7	4	17	
11	(Sweden) (15) Fredrik Lindgren	64	7	7	22	3	2	4	7	7	0	5	
12	(Denmark) (12) Niels Kristian Iversen	59	8	10	2	6	6	7	9	1	4	6	
13	(United Kingdom) (9) Chris Harris	54	6	6	5	3	10	7	3	9	5	ns	
14	(Poland) (14) Krzysztof Kasprzak	52	6	3	5	3	4	1	9	7	6	8	
15	(Czech Republic) (13) Lukáš Dryml	39	9	2	3	1	1	4	5	7	3	4	
16	(Poland) (16) Jarosław Hampel	16	–	16	–	–	–	–	–	–	–	–	
17	(Denmark) (16) Kenneth Bjerre	11	–	–	–	11	–	–	–	–	–	–	
18	(Poland) (16) Wiesław Jaguś	9	–	–	–	–	–	–	–	–	9	–	
19	(Czech Republic) (16) (19) Luboš Tomíček, Jr.	8	–	3	5	–	–	0	–	–	–	–	
20	(Slovenia) (16) Matej Žagar	7	7	–	–	–	–	–	–	–	–	–	
21	(Sweden) (16) (17) Jonas Davidsson	7	–	–	7	–	–	–	ns	–	–	–	
22	(United Kingdom) (16) Edward Kennett	4	–	–	–	–	4	–	–	–	–	–	
23	(Sweden) (16) Peter Ljung	3	–	–	–	–	–	–	3	–	–	–	
24	(Latvia) (16) Grigory Laguta	2	–	–	–	–	–	–	–	2	–	–	
25	(Italy) (17) Mattia Carpanese	2	–	–	–	–	–	–	–	–	–	2	
26	(Sweden) (18) Billy Forsberg	2	–	–	2	–	–	–	–	–	–	–	
27	(Denmark) (17) Nicolai Klindt	1	–	–	–	1	–	–	–	–	–	–	
28	(Poland) (17) (18) Krzysztof Buczkowski	1	–	ns	–	–	–	–	–	–	1	–	
29	(Italy) (16) Guglielmo Franchetti	0	–	–	–	–	–	–	–	–	–	0	
30	(Sweden) (17) Sebastian Aldén	0	–	–	0	–	–	–	–	–	–	–	
31	(Latvia) (17) Maksims Bogdanovs	0	–	–	–	–	–	–	–	0	–	–	
32	(Italy) (18) Alessandro Milanese	0	–	–	–	–	–	–	–	–	–	0	
Rider(s) not classified
	(Slovenia) (17) Izak Šantej	—	ns	–	–	–	–	–	–	–	–	–	
	(Poland) (17) Damian Baliński	—	–	ns	–	–	–	–	–	–	–	–	
	(United Kingdom) (17) Tai Woffinden	—	–	–	–	–	ns	–	–	–	–	–	
	(Czech Republic) (17) Adrian Rymel	—	–	–	–	–	–	ns	–	–	–	–	
	(Slovenia) (18) Denis Štojs	—	ns	–	–	–	–	–	–	–	–	–	
	(Denmark) (18) Patrick Hougaard	—	–	–	–	ns	–	–	–	–	–	–	
	(United Kingdom) (18) Simon Stead	—	–	–	–	–	ns	–	–	–	–	–	
	(Czech Republic) (18) Filip Šitera	—	–	–	–	–	–	ns	–	–	–	–	
	(Sweden) (18) Thomas H. Jonasson	—	–	–	–	–	–	–	ns	–	–	–	
	(Latvia) (18) Kasts Poudzuks	—	–	–	–	–	–	–	–	ns	–	–	
	(Poland) (18) Maciej Janowski	—	–	–	–	–	–	–	–	–	ns	–	
Pos.	Rider	Points	SVN (Slovenia)	EUR (Poland)	SWE (Sweden)	DEN (Denmark)	GBR (United Kingdom)	CZE (Czech Republic)	SCA (Sweden)	LAT (Latvia)	POL (Poland)	ITA (Italy)	FIN (Poland)

== See also ==
- Speedway Grand Prix
- List of Speedway Grand Prix riders
