= 2008 Speedway Grand Prix of Great Britain =

Speedway race in Cardiff, Wales

(United Kingdom) 2008 Speedway Grand Prix of Great Britain
- FIM Meridian Lifts British Speedway Grand Prix

Information
- Date: 28 June 2008
- City: (United Kingdom) Cardiff
- Event: 5 of 11 (105)
- Referee: Marek Wojaczek
- Jury President: Ila Teromaa

Stadium details
- Stadium: Millennium Stadium
- Capacity: 62,500
- Length: 387.7 m (424.0 yd)
- Track: Temporary

SGP Results
- Best Time: (Australia) Jason Crump; 55.8 secs (in Heat 3)
- (gold) Winner: (Australia) Jason Crump
- (silver) Runner-up: (United States) Greg Hancock
- (bronze) 3rd place: (Denmark) Nicki Pedersen

The 2008 Speedway Grand Prix of Great Britain, known as the 2008 FIM Meridian Lifts British Speedway Grand Prix for sponsorship reasons, was the fifth race of the 2008 Speedway Grand Prix season. It took place on 28 June, in the Millennium Stadium in Cardiff, Wales, United Kingdom. The British Grand Prix is one of the four Super Prix events held in 2008. The winner in Cardiff will progress to the Super Prix final, taking gate 3 and the white helmet colour.

== Riders ==
Edward Kennett was nominated as a wild card after he finished 2nd at the 2008 British Speedway Championship. Tai Woffinden and Simon Stead were the next highest finishing non-Grand Prix riders and both will be track reserves at Cardiff. The starting positions draw was made on 18 June, at the FIM Headquarters in Mies, Switzerland.

== Result ==
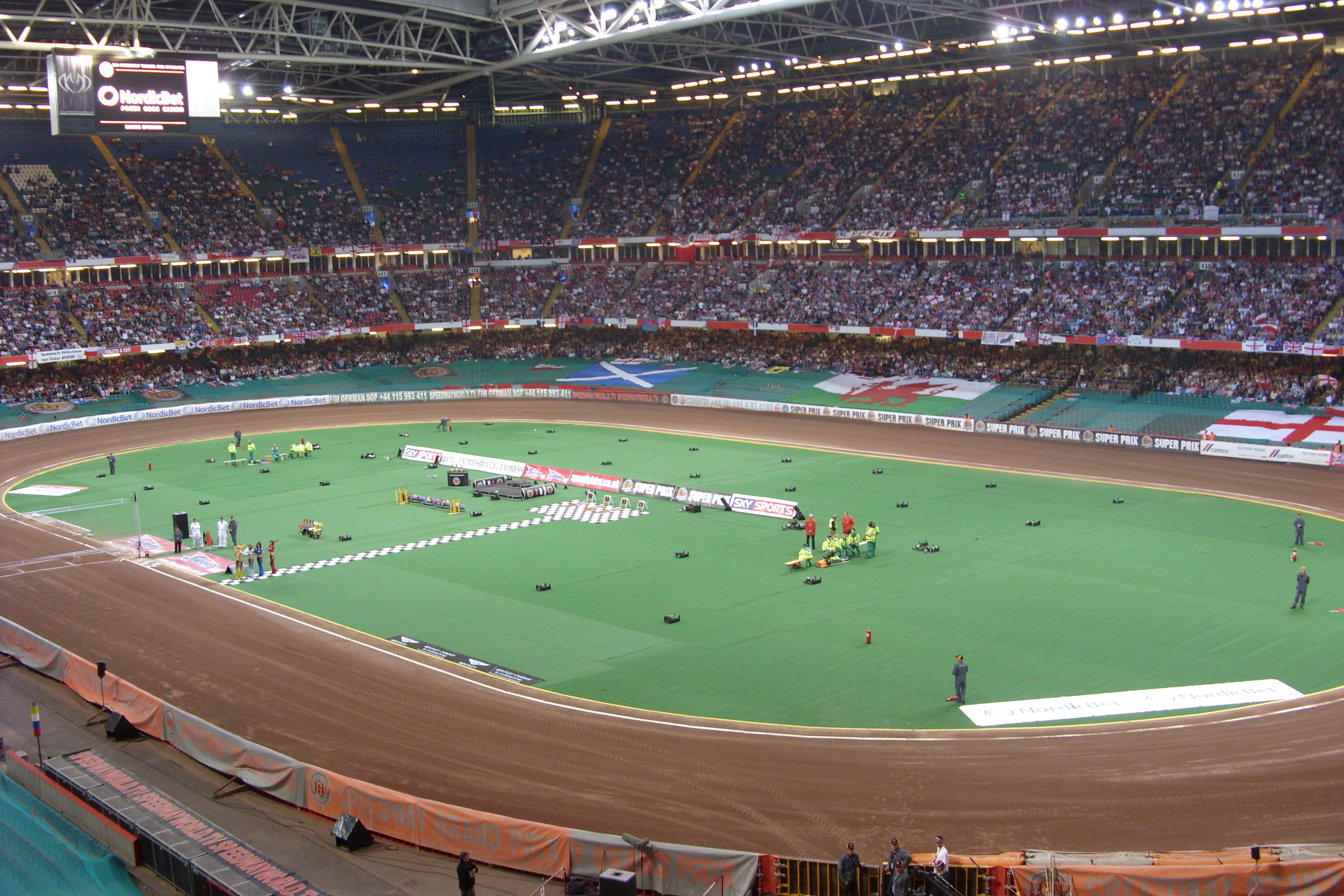
The 2008 British Grand Prix at the Millennium Stadium, Cardiff

Jason Crump from Australia was the winner of the British Grand Prix, he finished ahead of second placed Greg Hancock of the United States. Crump therefore takes the white helmet colour in the Super Prix final.

Nicki Pedersen benefited from controversial decisions by Polish referee Marek Wojaczek. Pedersen touched the tapes in an early heat, which should have resulted in a mandatory exclusion but Wojaczek allowed the race to continue and later, after an innocuous clash with Leigh Adams on the first corner of heat 17, Adams was excluded. In the first semi-final Bjarne Pedersen, who led the qualifying scorers with 14 points, clashed with his Nicki Pedersen in identical fashion to Adams and he, too, was excluded, much to the anger of the 45,000 crowd.

Great Britain's Scott Nicholls reached the final for the first time this year only to break the start tapes which resulted in his exclusion from the final. Nicki Pedersen fell in the final and therefore scored 0 points from the race, but still took third place on the podium. Nicki Pedersen still led the standings after the British Grand Prix, and it was the fifth time out of five Grand Prix that he had reached the final, although his first Grand Prix win in 2008 would not come until the following Czech Grand Prix.

== Heat details ==
Placing	Draw	Rider	Total	1	2	3	4	5	6	7	8	9	10	11	12	13	14	15	16	17	18	19	20	Pts	Pos	21	22	23
1	12	(Australia) (3) Jason Crump	22			3					2		3			3						3		14	2		2	3
2	13	(United States) (6) Greg Hancock	20				3	3							3		3					1		13	3		3	2
3	10	(Denmark) (1) Nicki Pedersen	11			2			1						2			0		3				8	7	3		F3
4	3	(United Kingdom) (8) Scott Nicholls	12	1						3				2				2				2		10	4	2		T
5	16	(Denmark) (11) Bjarne Pedersen	14				2				3	3						3			3			14	1	X
6	5	(United Kingdom) (9) Chris Harris	10		3			1					2					1					2	9	5		1
7	14	(Denmark) (5) Hans Andersen	9				0		3					1		1							3	8	6	1
8	15	(Sweden) (10) Andreas Jonsson	8				1			2			1						2	2				8	8		0
9	1	(Australia) (2) Leigh Adams	7	2				2				1				2				X				7	9
10	4	(Denmark) (12) Niels Kristian Iversen	6	3							0				F3				3				Fx	6	10
11	8	(Poland) (7) Rune Holta	6		2						1			3			0			X/F2				6	11
12	6	(Poland) (4) Tomasz Gollob	4		0				2			2							F4			0		4	12
13	9	(United Kingdom) (16) Edward Kennett	4			1		0						0					1		2			4	13
14	11	(Poland) (14) Krzysztof Kasprzak	4			0				1		0					2						1	4	14
15	7	(Sweden) (15) Fredrik Lindgren	2		1					0					X/2x	X/F3					1			2	15
16	2	(Czech Republic) (13) Lukáš Dryml	1	0					0				0				1				0			1	16
17	17	(United Kingdom) (17) Tai Woffinden	-																					-	17
18	18	(United Kingdom) (18) Simon Stead	-																					-	18
Placing	Draw	Rider	Total	1	2	3	4	5	6	7	8	9	10	11	12	13	14	15	16	17	18	19	20	Pts	Pos	21	22	23

e: retired or mechanical failure • m: exclusion for exceeding two minute time allowance • t: exclusion for touching the tapes • x: other exclusion • f: fell
ns: non-starter • nc: non-classify
Semi-finals: Heat 21: Riders placed 1st, 4th, 6th & 7th in the intermediate classification (after 20 heats)
Heat 22: Riders placed 2nd, 3rd, 5th & 8th in the intermediate classification (after 20 heats)
Big Final (heat 23): The first and second placed riders in each of the Semi-Finals

gate A – inside	gate B	gate C	gate D – outside

=== Heat after heat ===
1. (56.6) Iversen, Adams, Nicholls, Dryml
2. (56.0) Harris, Holta, Lindgren, Gollob
3. (55.8) Crump, N.Pedersen, Kennett, Kasprzak
4. (56.9) Hancock, B.Pedersen, Jonsson, Andersen
5. (55.9) Hancock, Adams, Harris, Kennett
6. (56.5) Andersen, Gollob, N.Pedersen, Dryml
7. (56.5) Nicholls, Jonsson, Kasprzak, Lindgren
8. (56.8) B.Pedersen, Crump, Holta, Iversen
9. (57.4) B.Pedersen, Gollob, Adams, Kasprzak
10. (56.2) Crump, Harris, Jonsson, Dryml
11. (57.6) Holta, Nicholls, Andersen, Kennett
12. (56.7) Hancock, N.Pedersen, Lindgren (X/2x), Iversen (u)
13. (56.2) Crump, Adams, Andersen, Lindgren (X/F)
14. (57.2) Hancock, Kasprzak, Dryml, Holta
15. (57.3) B.Pedersen, Nicholls, Harris, N. Pedersen
16. (57.1) Iversen, Jonsson, Kennett, Gollob (E4)
17. (57.1) N.Pedersen, Jonsson, Holta (X/F), Adams (X)
18. (57.5) B.Pedersen, Kennett, Lindgren, Dryml
19. (57.8) Crump, Nicholls, Hancock, Gollob
20. (57.5) Andersen, Harris, Kasprzak, Iversen (X/F)
  Semi-Finals:
21. (57.6) N.Pedersen, Nicholls, Andersen, B. Pedersen (X)
22. (57.7) Hancock, Crump, Harris, Jonsson
  Final:
23. (57.9) Crump (6 points), Hancock (4 points), N. Pedersen (F3), Nicholls (T)

== The intermediate classification ==
Qualifies for next season's Grand Prix series
Full-time Grand Prix rider
Wild card, track reserve or qualified reserve

Pos.	Rider	Points	SVN (Slovenia)	EUR (Poland)	SWE (Sweden)	DEN (Denmark)	GBR (United Kingdom)	CZE (Czech Republic)	SCA (Sweden)	LAT (Latvia)	POL (Poland)	ITA (Italy)	FIN (Poland)
1	(Denmark) (1) Nicki Pedersen	80	17	16	16	20	11						
2	(Australia) (3) Jason Crump	70	10	8	12	18	22						
3	(United States) (6) Greg Hancock	64	8	20	6	10	20						
4	(Poland) (4) Tomasz Gollob	62	19	12	8	19	4						
5	(Australia) (2) Leigh Adams	49	5	20	9	8	7						
6	(Denmark) (5) Hans N. Andersen	48	14	6	8	11	9						
7	(Sweden) (10) Andreas Jonsson	46	12	9	8	9	8						
8	(Sweden) (15) Fredrik Lindgren	41	7	7	22	3	2						
9	(Poland) (7) Rune Holta	39	5	4	17	7	6						
10	(United Kingdom) (8) Scott Nicholls	35	7	2	7	7	12						
11	(Denmark) (12) Niels Kristian Iversen	32	8	10	2	6	6						
12	(United Kingdom) (9) Chris Harris	30	6	6	5	3	10						
13	(Denmark) (11) Bjarne Pedersen	25	4	–	–	7	14						
14	(Poland) (14) Krzysztof Kasprzak	21	6	3	5	3	4						
15	(Czech Republic) (13) Lukáš Dryml	16	9	2	3	1	1						
16	(Poland) (16) Jarosław Hampel	16	–	16	–	–	–						
17	(Denmark) (16) Kenneth Bjerre	11	–	–	–	11	–						
18	(Czech Republic) (19) Luboš Tomíček, Jr.	8	–	3	5	–	–						
19	(Slovenia) (16) Matej Žagar	7	7	–	–	–	–						
20	(Sweden) (16) Jonas Davidsson	7	–	–	7	–	–						
21	(United Kingdom) (16) Edward Kennett	4	–	–	–	–	4						
22	(Sweden) (18) Billy Forsberg	2	–	–	2	–	–						
23	(Denmark) (17) Nicolai Klindt	1	–	–	–	1	–						
24	(Sweden) (17) Sebastian Aldén	0	–	–	0	–	–						
Rider(s) not classified
	(Slovenia) (17) Izak Šantej	—	ns	–	–	–	–						
	(Poland) (17) Damian Baliński	—	–	ns	–	–	–						
	(United Kingdom) (17) Tai Woffinden	—	–	–	–	–	ns						
	(Slovenia) (18) Denis Štojs	—	ns	–	–	–	–						
	(Poland) (18) Krzysztof Buczkowski	—	–	ns	–	–	–						
	(Denmark) (18) Patrick Hougaard	—	–	–	–	ns	–						
	(United Kingdom) (18) Simon Stead	—	–	–	–	–	ns						
Pos.	Rider	Points	SVN (Slovenia)	EUR (Poland)	SWE (Sweden)	DEN (Denmark)	GBR (United Kingdom)	CZE (Czech Republic)	SCA (Sweden)	LAT (Latvia)	POL (Poland)	ITA (Italy)	FIN (Poland)

== See also ==
- Speedway Grand Prix
- List of Speedway Grand Prix riders
