= 2008 Speedway Grand Prix of Czech Republic =

- FIM Czech Republic Speedway Grand Prix

Information
- Date: 2 August 2008
- City: (Czech Republic) Prague
- Event: 6 of 11 (106)
- Referee: (Sweden) Krister Gardell
- Jury President: (Germany) Wolfgang Glas

Stadium details
- Stadium: Marketa Stadium
- Capacity: 17,500
- Length: 353 m (386 yd)
- Track: speedway track

SGP Results
- Best Time: (Denmark) Nicki Pedersen; 62.73 secs (in Heat 3)
- (gold) Winner: (Denmark) Nicki Pedersen
- (silver) Runner-up: (Denmark) Hans N. Andersen
- (bronze) 3rd place: (Australia) Jason Crump

The 2008 Speedway Grand Prix of Czech Republic was the sixth race of the 2008 Speedway Grand Prix season. It took place on August 2 in the Marketa Stadium in Prague, Czech Republic.

Czech Republic SGP was won by current World Champion Nicki Pedersen from Denmark. It was his first GP Won in this season.

== Riders ==
The Speedway Grand Prix Commission nominated Luboš Tomíček as a wild card, and Adrian Rymel and Filip Šitera both as track reserves. The draw was made on July 22 at the FIM Headquarters in Mies, Switzerland.

== Heat details ==
Placing	Draw	Rider	Total	1	2	3	4	5	6	7	8	9	10	11	12	13	14	15	16	17	18	19	20	Pts	Pos	21	22	23
1	10	(Denmark) (1) Nicki Pedersen	22			3			2						3			3		3				14	1	2		3
2	13	(Denmark) (5) Hans N. Andersen	16				2	3							1		1					2		9	6	3		2
3	12	(Australia) (3) Jason Crump	17			2					3		3			2						3		13	2		2	1
4	16	(United States) (6) Greg Hancock	13				3				1	3						1			2			10	5		3	0
5	8	(Poland) (4) Tomasz Gollob	12		2						2			3			3			2				12	3		0
6	6	(Australia) (2) Leigh Adams	10		3				3			0							3			1		10	4	0
7	15	(Sweden) (10) Andreas Jonsson	9				1			3			2						2	0				8	7	1
8	5	(Poland) (7) Rune Holta	9		1			2					Fx					2					3	8	8		1
9	7	(Denmark) (11) Bjarne Pedersen	7		Fx					2					2	0					3			7	9
10	2	(Denmark) (12) Niels Kristian Iversen	7	3					0				1				2				1			7	10
11	1	(United Kingdom) (9) Chris Harris	7	2				0				1				3				1				7	11
12	14	(United Kingdom) (8) Scott Nicholls	6				0		1					2		1							2	6	12
13	11	(Czech Republic) (13) Lukáš Dryml	4			0				1		2					0						1	4	13
14	9	(Sweden) (15) Fredrik Lindgren	4			1		1						1					1		0			4	14
15	3	(Poland) (14) Krzysztof Kasprzak	1	1						0				0				0				0		1	15
16	4	(Czech Republic) (16) Luboš Tomíček, Jr.	0	0							0				0				0				0	0	16
17	17	(Czech Republic) (17) Adrian Rymel	-																					-	17
18	18	(Czech Republic) (18) Filip Šitera	-																					-	18
Placing	Draw	Rider	Total	1	2	3	4	5	6	7	8	9	10	11	12	13	14	15	16	17	18	19	20	Pts	Pos	21	22	23

e: retired or mechanical failure • m: exclusion for exceeding two minute time allowance • t: exclusion for touching the tapes • x: other exclusion • f: fell
ns: non-starter • nc: non-classify
Semi-finals: Heat 21: Riders placed 1st, 4th, 6th & 7th in the intermediate classification (after 20 heats)
Heat 22: Riders placed 2nd, 3rd, 5th & 8th in the intermediate classification (after 20 heats)
Big Final (heat 23): The first and second placed riders in each of the Semi-Finals

gate A – inside	gate B	gate C	gate D – outside

=== Heat after heat ===
1. (63.34) Iversen, Harris, Kasprzak, Tomicek
2. (63.28) Adams, Gollob, Holta, B.Pedersen (Fx)
3. (62.73) N.Pedersen, Crump, Lindgren, Dryml
4. (64.98) Hancock, Andersen, Jonsson, Nicholls
5. (63.88) Andersen, Holta, Lindgren, Harris
6. (63.15) Adams, N.Pedersen, Nicholls, Iversen
7. (63.28) Jonsson, B.Pedersen, Dryml, Kasprzak
8. (63.06) Crump, Gollob, Hancock, Tomicek
9. (63.95) Hancock, Dryml, Harris, Adams
10. (63.86) Crump, Jonsson, Iversen, Holta (Fx)
11. (64.49) Gollob, Nicholls, Lindgren, Kasprzak
12. (63.36) N.Pedersen, B.Pedersen, Andersen, Tomicek
13. (63.99) Harris, Crump, Nicholls, B.Pedersen
14. (64.72) Gollob, Iversen, Andersen, Dryml
15. (63.98) N.Pedersen, Holta, Hancock, Kasprzak
16. (64.01) Adams, Jonsson, Lindgren, Tomicek
17. (65.85) N.Pedersen, Gollob, Harris, Jonsson
18. (64.24) B.Pedersen, Hancock, Iversen, Lindgren
19. (64.78) Crump, Andersen, Adams, Kasprzak
20. (64.39) Holta, Nicholls, Dryml, Tomicek
  Semi-Finals:
21. (63.87) Andersen, N.Pedersen, Jonsson, Adams
22. (64.81) Hancock, Crump, Holta, Gollob
  Final:
23. (63.86) N.Pedersen (6 points), Andersen (4), Crump (2), Hancock (0)

== The intermediate classification ==
Qualifies for next season's Grand Prix series
Full-time Grand Prix rider
Wild card, track reserve or qualified reserve

Pos.	Rider	Points	SVN (Slovenia)	EUR (Poland)	SWE (Sweden)	DEN (Denmark)	GBR (United Kingdom)	CZE (Czech Republic)	SCA (Sweden)	LAT (Latvia)	POL (Poland)	ITA (Italy)	FIN (Poland)
1	(Denmark) (1) Nicki Pedersen	102	17	16	16	20	11	22					
2	(Australia) (3) Jason Crump	87	10	8	12	18	22	17					
3	(United States) (6) Greg Hancock	77	8	20	6	10	20	13					
4	(Poland) (4) Tomasz Gollob	74	19	12	8	19	4	12					
5	(Denmark) (5) Hans N. Andersen	64	14	6	8	11	9	16					
6	(Australia) (2) Leigh Adams	59	5	20	9	8	7	10					
7	(Sweden) (10) Andreas Jonsson	55	12	9	8	9	8	9					
8	(Poland) (7) Rune Holta	48	5	4	17	7	6	9					
9	(Sweden) (15) Fredrik Lindgren	45	7	7	22	3	2	4					
10	(United Kingdom) (8) Scott Nicholls	41	7	2	7	7	12	6					
11	(Denmark) (12) Niels Kristian Iversen	39	8	10	2	6	6	7					
12	(United Kingdom) (9) Chris Harris	37	6	6	5	3	10	7					
13	(Denmark) (11) Bjarne Pedersen	32	4	–	–	7	14	7					
14	(Poland) (14) Krzysztof Kasprzak	22	6	3	5	3	4	1					
15	(Czech Republic) (13) Lukáš Dryml	20	9	2	3	1	1	4					
16	(Poland) (16) Jarosław Hampel	16	–	16	–	–	–	–					
17	(Denmark) (16) Kenneth Bjerre	11	–	–	–	11	–	–					
18	(Czech Republic) (16) (19) Luboš Tomíček, Jr.	8	–	3	5	–	–	0					
19	(Slovenia) (16) Matej Žagar	7	7	–	–	–	–	–					
20	(Sweden) (16) Jonas Davidsson	7	–	–	7	–	–	–					
21	(United Kingdom) (16) Edward Kennett	4	–	–	–	–	4	–					
22	(Sweden) (18) Billy Forsberg	2	–	–	2	–	–	–					
23	(Denmark) (17) Nicolai Klindt	1	–	–	–	1	–	–					
24	(Sweden) (17) Sebastian Aldén	0	–	–	0	–	–	–					
Rider(s) not classified
	(Slovenia) (17) Izak Šantej	—	ns	–	–	–	–	–					
	(Poland) (17) Damian Baliński	—	–	ns	–	–	–	–					
	(United Kingdom) (17) Tai Woffinden	—	–	–	–	–	ns	–					
	(Czech Republic) (17) Adrian Rymel	—	–	–	–	–	–	ns					
	(Slovenia) (18) Denis Štojs	—	ns	–	–	–	–	–					
	(Poland) (18) Krzysztof Buczkowski	—	–	ns	–	–	–	–					
	(Denmark) (18) Patrick Hougaard	—	–	–	–	ns	–	–					
	(United Kingdom) (18) Simon Stead	—	–	–	–	–	ns	–					
	(Czech Republic) (18) Filip Šitera	—	–	–	–	–	–	ns					
Pos.	Rider	Points	SVN (Slovenia)	EUR (Poland)	SWE (Sweden)	DEN (Denmark)	GBR (United Kingdom)	CZE (Czech Republic)	SCA (Sweden)	LAT (Latvia)	POL (Poland)	ITA (Italy)	FIN (Poland)

== See also ==
- Speedway Grand Prix
- List of Speedway Grand Prix riders
