= 2008 Speedway Grand Prix of Scandinavia =

(Sweden) 2008 Speedway Grand Prix of Scandinavia
- FIM RingUp Scandinavian Speedway Grand Prix

Information
- Date: 16 August 2008
- City: (Sweden) Målilla
- Event: 7 of 11 (107)
- Referee: (Hungary) István Daragó
- Jury President: (Denmark) Jørgen L. Jensen

Stadium details
- Stadium: G&B Stadium
- Capacity: 15,000
- Length: 310 m (340 yd)
- Track: speedway track

SGP Results
- Best Time: (Denmark) Niels Kristian Iversen; 56.9 secs (in Heat 2)
- (gold) Winner: (Australia) Leigh Adams
- (silver) Runner-up: (Denmark) Hans N. Andersen
- (bronze) 3rd place: (Denmark) Nicki Pedersen

The 2008 Speedway Grand Prix of Scandinavia was the seventh race of the 2008 Speedway Grand Prix season. It took place on August 16, in the G&B Stadium in Målilla, Sweden. The Grand Prix was won by Leigh Adams from Australia. It was his second GP Won in this season.

== Riders ==
The Speedway Grand Prix Commission nominated Peter Ljung as a wild card, and Jonas Davidsson and Thomas H. Jonasson both as track reserves. The draw was made on August 5 at the FIM Headquarters in Mies, Switzerland.

== Heat details ==
| Placing | Draw | Rider | Total | 1 | 2 | 3 | 4 | 5 | 6 | 7 | 8 | 9 | 10 | 11 | 12 | 13 | 14 | 15 | 16 | 17 | 18 | 19 | 20 | Pts | Pos | 21 | 22 | 23 |
|---|---|---|---|---|---|---|---|---|---|---|---|---|---|---|---|---|---|---|---|---|---|---|---|---|---|---|---|---|
| 1 | 15 | (Australia) (2) Leigh Adams | 21 | | | | 3 | | | 3 | | | 1 | | | | | | 3 | 2 | | | | 12 | 2 | | 3 | 3 |
| 2 | 2 | (Denmark) (5) Hans N. Andersen | 20 | 3 | | | | | 3 | | | | 3 | | | | 3 | | | | 1 | | | 13 | 1 | 3 | | 2 |
| 3 | 14 | (Denmark) (1) Nicki Pedersen | 14 | | | | 2 | | 2 | | | | | E/st | | 3 | | | | | | | 3 | 10 | 4 | 2 | | 1 |
| 4 | 5 | (Australia) (3) Jason Crump | 12 | | 2 | | | 1 | | | | | 2 | | | | | 3 | | | | | 2 | 10 | 5 | | 2 | 0 |
| 5 | 9 | (United States) (6) Greg Hancock | 12 | | | 3 | | 2 | | | | | | 3 | | | | | 2 | | 2 | | | 12 | 3 | | 0 |
| 6 | 6 | (Denmark) (12) Niels Kristian Iversen | 9 | | 3 | | | | 1 | | | 3 | | | | | | | 0 | | | 1 | | 8 | 7 | 1 |
| 7 | 13 | (Poland) (14) Krzysztof Kasprzak | 9 | | | | 0 | 3 | | | | | | | 2 | | 2 | | | | | 2 | | 9 | 6 | 0 |
| 8 | 16 | (Poland) (4) Tomasz Gollob | 8 | | | | 1 | | | | E/st | 2 | | | | | | 1 | | | 3 | | | 7 | 8 | | 1 |
| 9 | 3 | (Sweden) (15) Fredrik Lindgren | 7 | 1 | | | | | | 2 | | | | 2 | | | | 2 | | | | F4 | | 7 | 9 |
| 10 | 12 | (Denmark) (11) Bjarne Pedersen | 6 | | | 0 | | | | | 2 | | 0 | | | 1 | | | | | | 3 | | 6 | 10 |
| 11 | 7 | (Sweden) (10) Andreas Jonsson | 6 | | X | | | | | 1 | | | | | 3 | 2 | | | | | 0 | | | 6 | 11 |
| 12 | 1 | (Poland) (7) Rune Holta | 5 | 2 | | | | 0 | | | | 0 | | | | E4 | | | | 3 | | | | 5 | 12 |
| 13 | 4 | (Czech Republic) (13) Lukáš Dryml | 5 | 0 | | | | | | | 3 | | | | 1 | | | | 1 | | | | 0 | 5 | 13 |
| 14 | 8 | (United Kingdom) (8) Scott Nicholls | 4 | | 1 | | | | | | 1 | | | 1 | | | 1 | | | X | | | | 4 | 14 |
| 15 | 10 | (Sweden) (16) Peter Ljung | 3 | | | 2 | | | 0 | | | | | | 0 | | | 0 | | 1 | | | | 3 | 15 |
| 16 | 11 | (United Kingdom) (9) Chris Harris | 3 | | | 1 | | | | 0 | | 1 | | | | | Fx | | | | | | 1 | 3 | 16 |
| 17 | 17 | (Sweden) (17) Jonas Davidsson | - | | | | | | | | | | | | | | | | | | | | | - | 17 |
| 18 | 18 | (Sweden) (18) Thomas H. Jonasson | - | | | | | | | | | | | | | | | | | | | | | - | 18 |
| Placing | Draw | Rider | Total | 1 | 2 | 3 | 4 | 5 | 6 | 7 | 8 | 9 | 10 | 11 | 12 | 13 | 14 | 15 | 16 | 17 | 18 | 19 | 20 | Pts | Pos | 21 | 22 | 23 |

e: retired or mechanical failure • m: exclusion for exceeding two minute time allowance • t: exclusion for touching the tapes • x: other exclusion • f: fell
ns: non-starter • nc: non-classify
Semi-finals: Heat 21: Riders placed 1st, 4th, 6th & 7th in the intermediate classification (after 20 heats)
Heat 22: Riders placed 2nd, 3rd, 5th & 8th in the intermediate classification (after 20 heats)
Big Final (heat 23): The first and second placed riders in each of the Semi-Finals

| gate A – inside | gate B | gate C | gate D – outside |

=== Heat after heat ===
1. (57.2) Andersen, Holta, Lindgren, Dryml
2. (56.9) Iversen, Crump, Nicholls, Jonsson (X)
  Nicholls crashes on 1st lap - Jonsson excluded
3. (58.7) Hancock, Ljung, Harris, B.Pedersen
4. (59.2) Adams, N.Pedersen, Gollob, Kasprzak
5. (59.4) Kasprzak, Hancock, Crump, Holta
6. (59.3) Andersen, N.Pedersen, Iversen, Ljung
7. (59.3) Adams, Lindgren, Jonsson, Harris
8. (60.1) Dryml, B.Pedersen, Nicholls, Gollob (E/start)
9. (59.7) Iversen, Gollob, Harris, Holta (E4)
10. (59.5) Andersen, Crump, Adams, B.Pedersen
11. (59.8) Hancock, Lindgren, Nicholls, N.Pedersen (E/start)
12. (59.8) Jonsson, Kasprzak, Dryml, Ljung
13. (59.2) N.Pedersen, Jonsson, B.Pedersen, Holta (E4)
14. (60.1) Andersen, Kasprzak, Nicholls, Harris (Fx)
  Harris crashes and is excluded
15. (59.9) Crump, Lindgren, Gollob, Ljung
16. (60.0) Adams, Hancock, Dryml, Iversen
17. (60.2) Holta, Adams, Ljung, Nicholls (Fx)
  Holta falls on first lap, Nicholls excluded
18. (60.3) Gollob, Hancock, Andersen, Jonsson
19. (61.2) B.Pedersen, Kasprzak, Iversen, Lindgren (F4)
20. (60.4) N.Pedersen, Crump, Harris, Dryml
  Semi-Finals:
21. (59.6) Andersen, N.Pedersen, Iversen, Kasprzak
22. (59.8) Adams, Crump, Gollob, Hancock
  The Final:
23. (59.7) Adams (6 points), Andersen (4), N.Pedersen (2), Crump (0)

== The intermediate classification ==
Qualifies for next season's Grand Prix series
Full-time Grand Prix rider
Wild card, track reserve or qualified reserve

| Pos. | Rider | Points | SVN (Slovenia) | EUR (Poland) | SWE (Sweden) | DEN (Denmark) | GBR (United Kingdom) | CZE (Czech Republic) | SCA (Sweden) | LAT (Latvia) | POL (Poland) | ITA (Italy) | FIN (Poland) |
| 1 | (Denmark) (1) Nicki Pedersen | 116 | 17 | 16 | 16 | 20 | 11 | 22 | 14 | | | | |
| 2 | (Australia) (3) Jason Crump | 99 | 10 | 8 | 12 | 18 | 22 | 17 | 12 | | | | |
| 3 | (United States) (6) Greg Hancock | 89 | 8 | 20 | 6 | 10 | 20 | 13 | 12 | | | | |
| 4 | (Denmark) (5) Hans N. Andersen | 84 | 14 | 6 | 8 | 11 | 9 | 16 | 20 | | | | |
| 5 | (Poland) (4) Tomasz Gollob | 82 | 19 | 12 | 8 | 19 | 4 | 12 | 8 | | | | |
| 6 | (Australia) (2) Leigh Adams | 80 | 5 | 20 | 9 | 8 | 7 | 10 | 21 | | | | |
| 7 | (Sweden) (10) Andreas Jonsson | 61 | 12 | 9 | 8 | 9 | 8 | 9 | 6 | | | | |
| 8 | (Poland) (7) Rune Holta | 53 | 5 | 4 | 17 | 7 | 6 | 9 | 5 | | | | |
| 9 | (Sweden) (15) Fredrik Lindgren | 52 | 7 | 7 | 22 | 3 | 2 | 4 | 7 | | | | |
| 10 | (Denmark) (12) Niels Kristian Iversen | 48 | 8 | 10 | 2 | 6 | 6 | 7 | 9 | | | | |
| 11 | (United Kingdom) (8) Scott Nicholls | 45 | 7 | 2 | 7 | 7 | 12 | 6 | 4 | | | | |
| 12 | (United Kingdom) (9) Chris Harris | 40 | 6 | 6 | 5 | 3 | 10 | 7 | 3 | | | | |
| 13 | (Denmark) (11) Bjarne Pedersen | 38 | 4 | ns | ns | 7 | 14 | 7 | 6 | | | | |
| 14 | (Poland) (14) Krzysztof Kasprzak | 31 | 6 | 3 | 5 | 3 | 4 | 1 | 9 | | | | |
| 15 | (Czech Republic) (13) Lukáš Dryml | 25 | 9 | 2 | 3 | 1 | 1 | 4 | 5 | | | | |
| 16 | (Poland) (16) Jarosław Hampel | 16 | – | 16 | – | – | – | – | – | | | | |
| 17 | (Denmark) (16) Kenneth Bjerre | 11 | – | – | – | 11 | – | – | – | | | | |
| 18 | (Czech Republic) (16) (19) Luboš Tomíček, Jr. | 8 | – | 3 | 5 | – | – | 0 | – | | | | |
| 19 | (Slovenia) (16) Matej Žagar | 7 | 7 | – | – | – | – | – | – | | | | |
| 20 | (Sweden) (16) (17) Jonas Davidsson | 7 | – | – | 7 | – | – | – | ns | | | | |
| 21 | (United Kingdom) (16) Edward Kennett | 4 | – | – | – | – | 4 | – | – | | | | |
| 22 | (Sweden) (16) Peter Ljung | 3 | – | – | – | – | – | – | 3 | | | | |
| 23 | (Sweden) (18) Billy Forsberg | 2 | – | – | 2 | – | – | – | – | | | | |
| 24 | (Denmark) (17) Nicolai Klindt | 1 | – | – | – | 1 | – | – | – | | | | |
| 25 | (Sweden) (17) Sebastian Aldén | 0 | – | – | 0 | – | – | – | – | | | | |
Rider(s) not classified
| | (Slovenia) (17) Izak Šantej | — | ns | – | – | – | – | – | – | | | | |
| | (Poland) (17) Damian Baliński | — | – | ns | – | – | – | – | – | | | | |
| | (United Kingdom) (17) Tai Woffinden | — | – | – | – | – | ns | – | – | | | | |
| | (Czech Republic) (17) Adrian Rymel | — | – | – | – | – | – | ns | – | | | | |
| | (Slovenia) (18) Denis Štojs | — | ns | – | – | – | – | – | – | | | | |
| | (Poland) (18) Krzysztof Buczkowski | — | – | ns | – | – | – | – | – | | | | |
| | (Denmark) (18) Patrick Hougaard | — | – | – | – | ns | – | – | – | | | | |
| | (United Kingdom) (18) Simon Stead | — | – | – | – | – | ns | – | – | | | | |
| | (Czech Republic) (18) Filip Šitera | — | – | – | – | – | – | ns | – | | | | |
| | (Sweden) (18) Thomas H. Jonasson | — | – | – | – | – | – | – | ns | | | | |
| Pos. | Rider | Points | SVN (Slovenia) | EUR (Poland) | SWE (Sweden) | DEN (Denmark) | GBR (United Kingdom) | CZE (Czech Republic) | SCA (Sweden) | LAT (Latvia) | POL (Poland) | ITA (Italy) | FIN (Poland) |

== See also ==
- Speedway Grand Prix
- List of Speedway Grand Prix riders
