= 2008 Speedway Grand Prix of Latvia =

- FIM Latvijas Mobilais Telefons Speedway Grand Prix

Information
- Date: 30 August 2008
- City: (Latvia) Daugavpils
- Event: 8 of 11 (108)
- Referee: (Sweden) Krister Gardell
- Jury President: (Finland) Ilkka Teromaa

Stadium details
- Stadium: Latvijas Spidveja Centrs
- Capacity: 10,500
- Length: 373 m (408 yd)
- Track: speedway track

SGP Results
- Best Time: (United States) Greg Hancock; 68.65 secs (in Heat 1)
- (gold) Winner: (Australia) Jason Crump
- (silver) Runner-up: (Denmark) Nicki Pedersen
- (bronze) 3rd place: (Poland) Tomasz Gollob

The 2008 Speedway Grand Prix of Latvia was the eighth race of the 2008 Speedway Grand Prix season. It was held on August 30, 2008, in the Latvijas Spidveja Centrs in Daugavpils, Latvia. The Grand Prix was won by Jason Crump from Australia, it was his second GP win of the season.

== Riders ==
The Speedway Grand Prix Commission nominated Grigory Laguta as a wild card, and Kasts Puodzuks and Maksims Bogdanovs both as track reserves. The draw was made on August 19 at the FIM Headquarters in Mies, Switzerland.

== Heat details ==
| Placing | Draw | Rider | Total | 1 | 2 | 3 | 4 | 5 | 6 | 7 | 8 | 9 | 10 | 11 | 12 | 13 | 14 | 15 | 16 | 17 | 18 | 19 | 20 | Pts | Pos | 21 | 22 | 23 |
|---|---|---|---|---|---|---|---|---|---|---|---|---|---|---|---|---|---|---|---|---|---|---|---|---|---|---|---|---|
| 1 | 12 | (Australia) (3) Jason Crump | 19 | | | 3 | | | | | 2 | | 3 | | | F3x | | | | | | 3 | | 11 | 3 | | 2 | 3 |
| 2 | 4 | (Denmark) (1) Nicki Pedersen | 18 | 2 | | | | | | | 3 | | | | 3 | | | | 3 | | | | 0 | 11 | 2 | | 3 | 2 |
| 3 | 5 | (Poland) (4) Tomasz Gollob | 16 | | 2 | | | 2 | | | | | 1 | | | | | 3 | | | | | 3 | 11 | 4 | 3 | | 1 |
| 4 | 2 | (United States) (6) Greg Hancock | 13 | 3 | | | | | 3 | | | | 0 | | | | 3 | | | | 2 | | | 11 | 1 | 2 | | 0 |
| 5 | 16 | (Sweden) (10) Andreas Jonsson | 10 | | | | 3 | | | | 1 | 3 | | | | | | 2 | | | M/- | | | 9 | 5 | | 1 |
| 6 | 7 | (Australia) (2) Leigh Adams | 9 | | 3 | | | | | 1 | | | | | 2 | 2 | | | | | 1 | | | 9 | 6 | 0 |
| 7 | 1 | (United Kingdom) (9) Chris Harris | 9 | 1 | | | | 1 | | | | 2 | | | | 1 | | | | 3 | | | | 8 | 7 | 1 |
| 8 | 9 | (Denmark) (11) Bjarne Pedersen | 7 | | | 0 | | 0 | | | | | | 2 | | | | | 2 | | 3 | | | 7 | 8 | | 0 |
| 9 | 13 | (United Kingdom) (8) Scott Nicholls | 7 | | | | 2 | 3 | | | | | | | 0 | | Fx | | | | | 2 | | 7 | 9 |
| 10 | 14 | (Denmark) (5) Hans N. Andersen | 7 | | | | 1 | | 2 | | | | | 0 | | 3 | | | | | | | 1 | 7 | 10 |
| 11 | 3 | (Poland) (14) Krzysztof Kasprzak | 7 | 0 | | | | | | 2 | | | | 3 | | | | 1 | | | | 1 | | 7 | 11 |
| 12 | 15 | (Sweden) (15) Fredrik Lindgren | 7 | | | | 0 | | | 3 | | | 2 | | | | | | 1 | 1 | | | | 7 | 12 |
| 13 | 11 | (Czech Republic) (13) Lukáš Dryml | 7 | | | 2 | | | | F3 | | 1 | | | | | 2 | | | | | | 2 | 7 | 13 |
| 14 | 10 | (Poland) (7) Rune Holta | 4 | | | 1 | | | 0 | | | | | | 1 | | | 0 | | 2 | | | | 4 | 14 |
| 15 | 6 | (Russia) (16) Grigory Laguta | 2 | | 1 | | | | 1 | | | 0 | | | | | | | F4 | | | 0 | | 2 | 15 |
| 16 | 8 | (Denmark) (12) Niels Kristian Iversen | 1 | | 0 | | | | | | 0 | | | 1 | | | F2x | | | 0 | | | | 1 | 16 |
| 17 | 17 | (Latvia) (17) Maksims Bogdanovs | 0 | | | | | | | | | | | | | | | | | | 0 | | | 0 | 17 |
| 18 | 18 | (Latvia) (18) Kasts Poudzuks | - | | | | | | | | | | | | | | | | | | | | | - | 18 |
| Placing | Draw | Rider | Total | 1 | 2 | 3 | 4 | 5 | 6 | 7 | 8 | 9 | 10 | 11 | 12 | 13 | 14 | 15 | 16 | 17 | 18 | 19 | 20 | Pts | Pos | 21 | 22 | 23 |

e: retired or mechanical failure • m: exclusion for exceeding two minute time allowance • t: exclusion for touching the tapes • x: other exclusion • f: fell
ns: non-starter • nc: non-classify
Semi-finals: Heat 21: Riders placed 1st, 4th, 6th & 7th in the intermediate classification (after 20 heats)
Heat 22: Riders placed 2nd, 3rd, 5th & 8th in the intermediate classification (after 20 heats)
Big Final (heat 23): The first and second placed riders in each of the Semi-Finals

| gate A – inside | gate B | gate C | gate D – outside |

=== Heat after heat ===
1. (68.65) Hancock, N.Pedersen, Harris, Kasprzak
2. (69.09) Adams, Gollob, Laguta, Iversen
3. (69.29) Crump, Dryml, Holta, B.Pedersen
4. (69.47) Jonsson, Nicholls, Andersen, Lindgren
5. (69.54) Nicholls, Gollob, Harris, B.Pedersen
6. (69.39) Hancock, Andersen, Laguta, Holta
7. (70.44) Lindgren, Kasprzak, Adams, Dryml (F3)
8. (69.77) N.Pedersen, Crump, Jonsson, Iversen
9. (70.35) Jonsson, Harris, Dryml, Laguta
10. (69.40) Crump, Lindgren, Gollob, Hancock
11. (70.03) Kasprzak, B.Pedersen, Iversen, Andersen
12. (70.30) N.Pedersen, Adams, Holta, Nicholls
13. (69.31) Andersen, Adams, Harris, Crump (F3x)
14. (70.07) Hancock, Dryml, Iversen (F2x), Nicholls (Fx)
15. (70.50) Gollob, Jonsson, Kasprzak, Holta
16. (71.00) N.Pedersen, B.Pedersen, Lindgren, Laguta (F4)
17. (71.32) Harris, Holta, Lindgren, Iversen
18. (71.05) B.Pedersen, Hancock, Adams, Bogdanow, Jonsson (M/-)
19. (70.35) Crump, Nicholls, Kasprzak, Laguta
20. (70.71) Gollob, Dryml, Andersen, N.Pedersen
  Semi-Finals:
21. (71.55) Gollob, Hancock, Harris, Adams
22. (70.74) N.Pedersen, Crump, Jonsson, B.Pedersen
  Final:
23. (70.36) Crump (6 points), N.Pedersen (4), Gollob (2), Hancock (0)

== The intermediate classification ==
Qualifies for next season's Grand Prix series
Full-time Grand Prix rider
Wild card, track reserve or qualified reserve

| Pos. | Rider | Points | SVN (Slovenia) | EUR (Poland) | SWE (Sweden) | DEN (Denmark) | GBR (United Kingdom) | CZE (Czech Republic) | SCA (Sweden) | LAT (Latvia) | POL (Poland) | ITA (Italy) | FIN (Poland) |
| 1 | (Denmark) (1) Nicki Pedersen | 134 | 17 | 16 | 16 | 20 | 11 | 22 | 14 | 18 | | | |
| 2 | (Australia) (3) Jason Crump | 118 | 10 | 8 | 12 | 18 | 22 | 17 | 12 | 19 | | | |
| 3 | (United States) (6) Greg Hancock | 102 | 8 | 20 | 6 | 10 | 20 | 13 | 12 | 13 | | | |
| 4 | (Poland) (4) Tomasz Gollob | 98 | 19 | 12 | 8 | 19 | 4 | 12 | 8 | 16 | | | |
| 5 | (Denmark) (5) Hans N. Andersen | 91 | 14 | 6 | 8 | 11 | 9 | 16 | 20 | 7 | | | |
| 6 | (Australia) (2) Leigh Adams | 89 | 5 | 20 | 9 | 8 | 7 | 10 | 21 | 9 | | | |
| 7 | (Sweden) (10) Andreas Jonsson | 71 | 12 | 9 | 8 | 9 | 8 | 9 | 6 | 10 | | | |
| 8 | (Sweden) (15) Fredrik Lindgren | 59 | 7 | 7 | 22 | 3 | 2 | 4 | 7 | 7 | | | |
| 9 | (Poland) (7) Rune Holta | 57 | 5 | 4 | 17 | 7 | 6 | 9 | 5 | 4 | | | |
| 10 | (United Kingdom) (8) Scott Nicholls | 52 | 7 | 2 | 7 | 7 | 12 | 6 | 4 | 7 | | | |
| 11 | (United Kingdom) (9) Chris Harris | 49 | 6 | 6 | 5 | 3 | 10 | 7 | 3 | 9 | | | |
| 12 | (Denmark) (12) Niels Kristian Iversen | 49 | 8 | 10 | 2 | 6 | 6 | 7 | 9 | 1 | | | |
| 13 | (Denmark) (11) Bjarne Pedersen | 45 | 4 | – | – | 7 | 14 | 7 | 6 | 7 | | | |
| 14 | (Poland) (14) Krzysztof Kasprzak | 38 | 6 | 3 | 5 | 3 | 4 | 1 | 9 | 7 | | | |
| 15 | (Czech Republic) (13) Lukáš Dryml | 32 | 9 | 2 | 3 | 1 | 1 | 4 | 5 | 7 | | | |
| 14 | (Poland) (16) Jarosław Hampel | 16 | – | 16 | – | – | – | – | – | – | | | |
| 17 | (Denmark) (16) Kenneth Bjerre | 11 | – | – | – | 11 | – | – | – | – | | | |
| 18 | (Czech Republic) (16) (19) Luboš Tomíček, Jr. | 8 | – | 3 | 5 | – | – | 0 | – | – | | | |
| 19 | (Slovenia) (16) Matej Žagar | 7 | 7 | – | – | – | – | – | – | – | | | |
| 20 | (Sweden) (16) (17) Jonas Davidsson | 7 | – | – | 7 | – | – | – | ns | – | | | |
| 21 | (United Kingdom) (16) Edward Kennett | 4 | – | – | – | – | 4 | – | – | – | | | |
| 22 | (Sweden) (16) Peter Ljung | 3 | – | – | – | – | – | – | 3 | – | | | |
| 23 | (Russia) (16) Grigory Laguta | 2 | – | – | – | – | – | – | – | 2 | | | |
| 24 | (Sweden) (18) Billy Forsberg | 2 | – | – | 2 | – | – | – | – | – | | | |
| 25 | (Denmark) (17) Nicolai Klindt | 1 | – | – | – | 1 | – | – | – | – | | | |
| 26 | (Sweden) (17) Sebastian Aldén | 0 | – | – | 0 | – | – | – | – | – | | | |
| 27 | (Latvia) (17) Maksims Bogdanovs | 0 | – | – | – | – | – | – | – | 0 | | | |
Rider(s) not classified
| | (Slovenia) (17) Izak Šantej | — | ns | – | – | – | – | – | – | – | | | |
| | (Poland) (17) Damian Baliński | — | – | ns | – | – | – | – | – | – | | | |
| | (United Kingdom) (17) Tai Woffinden | — | – | – | – | – | ns | – | – | – | | | |
| | (Czech Republic) (17) Adrian Rymel | — | – | – | – | – | – | ns | – | – | | | |
| | (Slovenia) (18) Denis Štojs | — | ns | – | – | – | – | – | – | – | | | |
| | (Poland) (18) Krzysztof Buczkowski | — | – | ns | – | – | – | – | – | – | | | |
| | (Denmark) (18) Patrick Hougaard | — | – | – | – | ns | – | – | – | – | | | |
| | (United Kingdom) (18) Simon Stead | — | – | – | – | – | ns | – | – | – | | | |
| | (Czech Republic) (18) Filip Šitera | — | – | – | – | – | – | ns | – | – | | | |
| | (Sweden) (18) Thomas H. Jonasson | — | – | – | – | – | – | – | ns | – | | | |
| | (Latvia) (18) Kasts Poudzuks | — | – | – | – | – | – | – | – | ns | | | |
| Pos. | Rider | Points | SVN (Slovenia) | EUR (Poland) | SWE (Sweden) | DEN (Denmark) | GBR (United Kingdom) | CZE (Czech Republic) | SCA (Sweden) | LAT (Latvia) | POL (Poland) | ITA (Italy) | FIN (Poland) |

== See also ==
- Speedway Grand Prix
- List of Speedway Grand Prix riders
