= Bjarne Pedersen =

Danish speedway rider (born 1978)

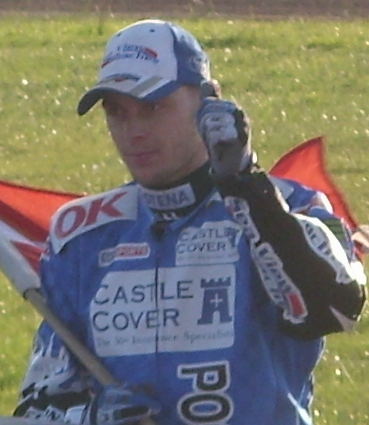
- Born: 12 July 1978 (age 48); Holstebro, Denmark
- Nationality: Danish

Career history

Denmark
- 1996–2001, 2007–2015, 2018: Holstebro
- 2002: Vojens
- 2003–2006, 2014–2017: Holsted
- 2004: Slangerup
- 2019–2021: Esbjerg

Great Britain
- 2000–2001, 2003: Newcastle Diamonds
- 2002–2010, 2016: Poole Pirates
- 2011, 2013–14: Eastbourne Eagles
- 2012: Birmingham Brummies
- 2015: Leicester Lions
- 2021: Peterborough Panthers
- 2021: Plymouth Gladiators

Poland
- 1997, 2019–2020: Opole
- 1999, 2006: Toruń
- 2001–2002: Rawicz
- 2003: Łódź
- 2004: Zielona Góra
- 2005, 2007–2008: Gdańsk
- 2009–2011: Tarnów
- 2012–2015: Gniezno
- 2016: Piła
- 2017: Lublin
- 2018: Ostrów

Sweden
- 1998, 2012: Vargarna
- 1999, 2016: Elit Vetlanda
- 2000–2002: Kaparna
- 2003, 2005–2009: Västervik
- 2004: Masarna
- 2010, 2017–2018: Indianerna
- 2014–2015: Piraterna

Germany
- 2015: Diedenbergen

Speedway Grand Prix statistics
- Starts: 71
- Podiums: 7 (1-2-4)
- Finalist: 7 times
- Winner: 1 times

Individual honours
- 2004: Danish Champion
- 2004: Elite League Riders Champion
- 1999: Danish Junior Champion
- 2004: European Grand Prix Winner

Team honours
- 2003, 2004, 2008: Elite League Champion
- 2003, 2004: Elite League KO Cup Winner
- 2002, 2006: Craven Shield Winner
- 2003: British League Cup Winner
- 2001: Premier League Champion
- 2005: Swedish Elitserien Champion
- 1997, 2003, 2006: Danish League Champion
- 2007: Elite League Pairs Champion
- 2006, 2008: World Cup Winner

Bjarne Aagaard Pedersen (born 12 July 1978) is a former international motorcycle speedway rider who represented Denmark in the Speedway World Cup, winning it on two occasions: in 2006 and 2008.

== Career summary ==
Pedersen began his speedway career in 1990. He won his first title in 1994 winning a Danish junior pairs championship with Charlie Gjedde. However, he did not ride as a full-time professional until 2000.

Pedersen began his United Kingdom racing career in with the Newcastle Diamonds in the Premier League. He took part in his first two Speedway Grand Prix events in 2002, both as a wild card. His first full Speedway Grand Prix season came in 2003, but it was not until 2004 when Pedersen won his only Grand Prix to date at the European GP in Wrocław. Also in 2004, he won the Elite League Riders' Championship, held at Wimborne Road on 17 October.

Pedersen admitted at the end of the 2007 season that he had lost enthusiasm for riding in Speedway Grand Prix series until he qualified for the 2008 series in the race off in Vojens.

Pedersen was retained by Poole for the 2008 season over former world champion Jason Crump when it was announced the British Speedway Promoters' Association (BSPA) that the points limit for team building purposes was to be reduced drastically. Poole promoter Matt Ford stated that Pedersen was chosen due to his loyalty to Poole over the previous six seasons. He continued to ride for Poole until the end of the 2010 season when he joined Eastbourne Eagles for the 2011 Elite League speedway season.

On 20 August 2011, Pedersen qualified for the 2012 Speedway Grand Prix as a permanent rider, after finishing runner-up in the GP Challenge. After one season with Birmingham Brummies he returned to Eastbourne for the 2013 and 2014 seasons.

Following a few rides for Leicester Lions in 2015, Pedersen rejoined Poole for the 2016 Elite League campaign.

In 2021, Pedersen signed for Peterborough Panthers and Plymouth Gladiators and after winning the league and cup double with Peterborough during the SGB Premiership 2021 season, he announced his retirement.

== Speedway Grand Prix results ==
Year	Position	Points	Best Finish	Notes
2002	26th	10	12th	2 Wild card rides
2003	14th	51	3rd	Finished 3rd in the Norwegian GP
2004	10th	78	Winner	Won the European GP
2005	6th	90	2nd	Finished 3rd in the Swedish GP, 3rd in the British GP and 2nd in the Czech GP
2006	12th	82	3rd	Finished 3rd in the Danish GP
2007	12th	77	5th	
2008	11th	69	2nd	Missed European and Swedish GPs through injury. Finished 2nd in the Italian GP.
2011	22nd	3	14th	1 Wild card ride
2012	13th	59	6th	

2007 Speedway Grand Prix Final Championship standings (Riding No 12)
Race no.	Grand Prix	Pos.	Pts.	Heats	Draw No
1 /11	(Italy) Italian SGP	12	5	(1,E,3,1,1)	5
2 /11	(Europe) European SGP	7	8	(3,1,0,2,1) +1	12
3 /11	(Sweden) Swedish SGP	16	3	(0,0,2,1,0)	4
4 /11	(Denmark) Danish SGP	13	5	(X,3,1,0,1)	11
5 /11	(United Kingdom) British SGP	10	7	(2,3,1,1,0)	15
6 /11	(Czech Republic) Czech Rep. SGP	11	6	(3,1,0,0,2)	1
7 /11	(Sweden) Scandinavian SGP	9	7	(0,1,2,2,2)	7
8 /11	(Latvia) Latvian SGP	9	8	(2,2,2,1,1)	15
9 /11	(Poland) Polish SGP	8	8	(3,1,3,1,0) +0	12
10 /11	(Slovenia) Slovenian SGP	7	9	(0,0,2,3,3) +1	9
11 /11	(Germany) German SGP	5	11	(0,3,2,2,3) +1	12

2008 Speedway Grand Prix Final Championship standings (Riding No 11)
Race no.	Grand Prix	Pos.	Pts.	Heats	Draw No
1 /11	(Slovenia) Slovenian SGP	16	4	(0,0,2,0,2)	5
2 /11	(Europe) European SGP	-	-	Injured*	-
3 /11	(Sweden) Swedish SGP	-	-	Injured*	-
4 /11	(Denmark) Danish SGP	9	7	(1,2,3,0,1)	1
5 /11	(United Kingdom) British SGP	5	14	(2,3,3,3,3) +0(X))	16
6 /11	(Czech Republic) Czech Rep. SGP	9	7	(F/x,2,2,0,3)	7
7 /11	(Sweden) Scandinavian SGP	10	6	(0,2,0,1,3)	12
8 /11	(Latvia) Latvian SGP	8	7	(0,0,2,2,3) +0	9
9 /11	(Poland) Polish SGP	14	4	(1,1,0,2,1)	15
10 /11	(Italy) Italian SGP	2	17	(3,0,2,3,3) +2 +4	5
11 /11	(Germany) German SGP	14	3	(1,1,1,0,0)	15

permanent speedway rider
wild card, track reserve or qualified reserve
rider not classified (track reserve who did not start)

* Pedersen sustained a broken wrist during a Craven Shield meeting for Poole on 2 May 2008. His place at the European Grand Prix and the Swedish Grand Prix were taken by first reserve Lubos Tomicek.
