= 2008 Speedway Grand Prix of Poland =

- FIM Bydgoszcz Speedway Grand Prix of Poland

Information
- Date: 13 September 2008
- City: (Poland) Bydgoszcz
- Event: 9 of 11 (109)
- Referee: (Hungary) István Daragó

Stadium details
- Stadium: Polonia Stadium
- Capacity: 18,000
- Length: 348 m (381 yd)
- Track: speedway track (granite)

SGP Results
- Best Time
- (gold) Winner: (United States) Greg Hancock
- (silver) Runner-up: (Denmark) Nicki Pedersen
- (bronze) 3rd place: (Poland) Tomasz Gollob

The 2008 Speedway Grand Prix of Poland was the ninth race of the 2008 Speedway Grand Prix season. It took place on September 13 in the Polonia Stadium in Bydgoszcz, Poland. The Grand Prix was won by Greg Hancock from United States, it was his first GP win of the 2008 season.

== Riders ==
The Speedway Grand Prix Commission nominated Wiesław Jaguś as a wild card, and Krzysztof Buczkowski and Adrian Gomólski both as track reserves. The draw was made on September 2 at the FIM Headquarters in Mies, Switzerland. Maciej Janowski replaced Adrian Gomólski, having been injured in the Polish First League match on 2008-09-07 (KM Ostrów vs Polonia Bydgoszcz 42:47).

- Draw No 18: (Poland) (18) Adrian Gomólski → (Poland) (18) Maciej Janowski

Andreas Jonsson and Krzysztof Buczkowski were Polonia Bydgoszcz's riders in 2008 season.

== Heat details ==
Placing	Draw	Rider	Total	1	2	3	4	5	6	7	8	9	10	11	12	13	14	15	16	17	18	19	20	Pts	Pos	21	22	23
1	12	(United States) (6) Greg Hancock	18			2					2		1			3						2		10	3		2	3
2	10	(Denmark) (1) Nicki Pedersen	21			3			3						2			3		3				14	2		3	2
3	13	(Poland) (4) Tomasz Gollob	20				3	3							3		3					3		15	1	3		1
4	4	(United Kingdom) (8) Scott Nicholls	10	3							3				1				1				0	8	7	2		0
5	1	(Denmark) (5) Hans N. Andersen	10	1				2				3				2				1				9	4	1
6	5	(Australia) (3) Jason Crump	9		3			1					2					0					3	9	5		0
7	2	(Poland) (16) Wiesław Jaguś	9	2					0				3				2				1			8	8		1
8	11	(Australia) (2) Leigh Adams	9			1				3		2					1						2	9	6	0
9	14	(Sweden) (10) Andreas Jonsson	8				2		1					3		1							1	8	9
10	16	(Poland) (7) Rune Holta	6				0				1	0						2			3			6	10
11	9	(Poland) (14) Krzysztof Kasprzak	6			0		E4						1					3		2			6	11
12	6	(United Kingdom) (9) Chris Harris	5		2				2			1							0			0		5	12
13	3	(Denmark) (12) Niels Kristian Iversen	4	0						2				0				1				1		4	13
14	15	(Denmark) (11) Bjarne Pedersen	4				1			1			0						2	0				4	14
15	8	(Czech Republic) (13) Lukáš Dryml	3		0						0			2			0			1				3	15
16	17	(Poland) (17) Krzysztof Buczkowski	1		1																			1	16
17	7	(Sweden) (15) Fredrik Lindgren	0		T/-					0					0	E3					0			0	17
18	18	(Poland) (18) Maciej Janowski	-																					-	18
Placing	Draw	Rider	Total	1	2	3	4	5	6	7	8	9	10	11	12	13	14	15	16	17	18	19	20	Pts	Pos	21	22	23

e: retired or mechanical failure • m: exclusion for exceeding two minute time allowance • t: exclusion for touching the tapes • x: other exclusion • f: fell
ns: non-starter • nc: non-classify
Semi-finals: Heat 21: Riders placed 1st, 4th, 6th & 7th in the intermediate classification (after 20 heats)
Heat 22: Riders placed 2nd, 3rd, 5th & 8th in the intermediate classification (after 20 heats)
Big Final (heat 23): The first and second placed riders in each of the Semi-Finals

gate A – inside	gate B	gate C	gate D – outside

=== Heat after heat ===
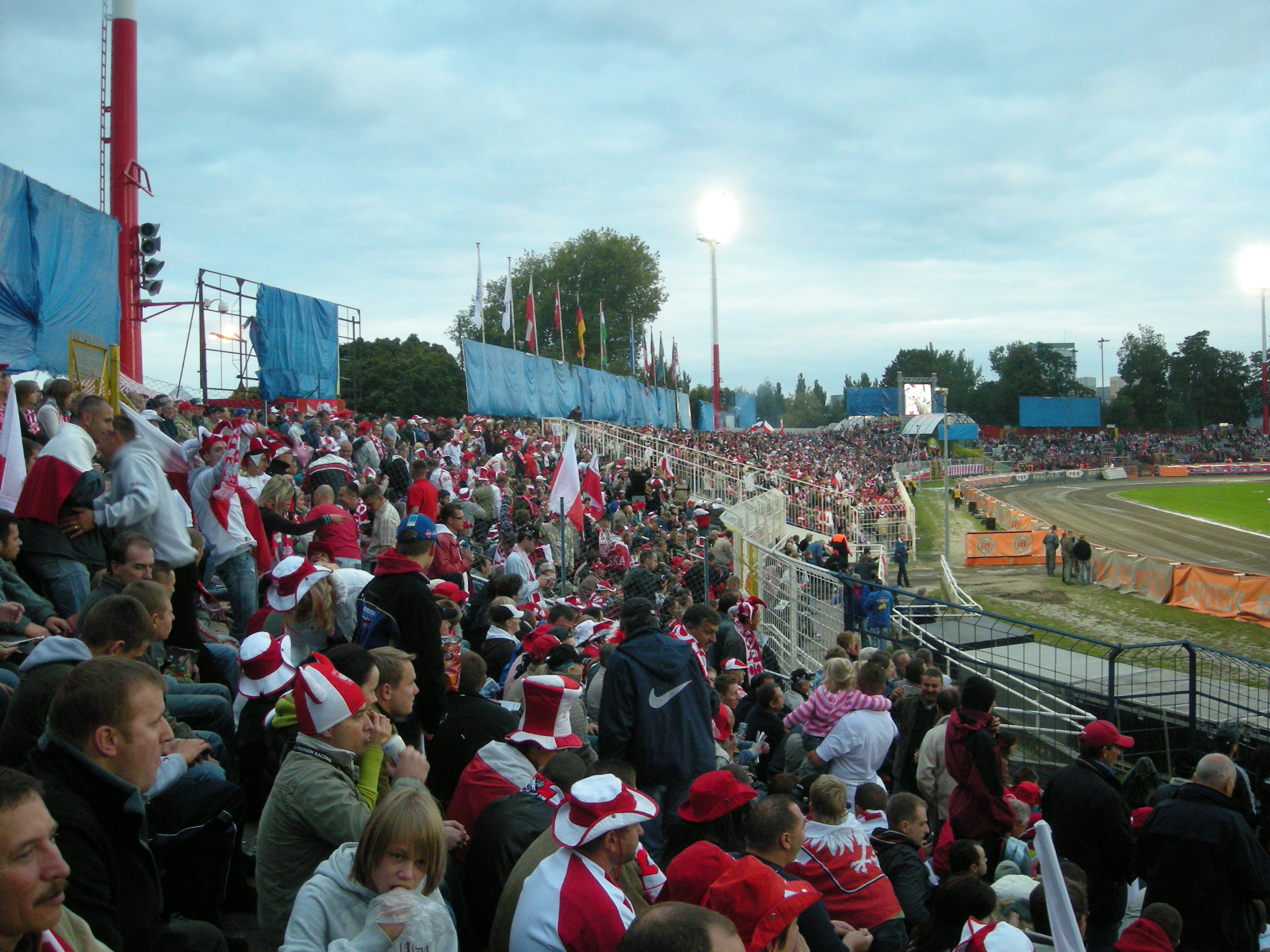
Fans

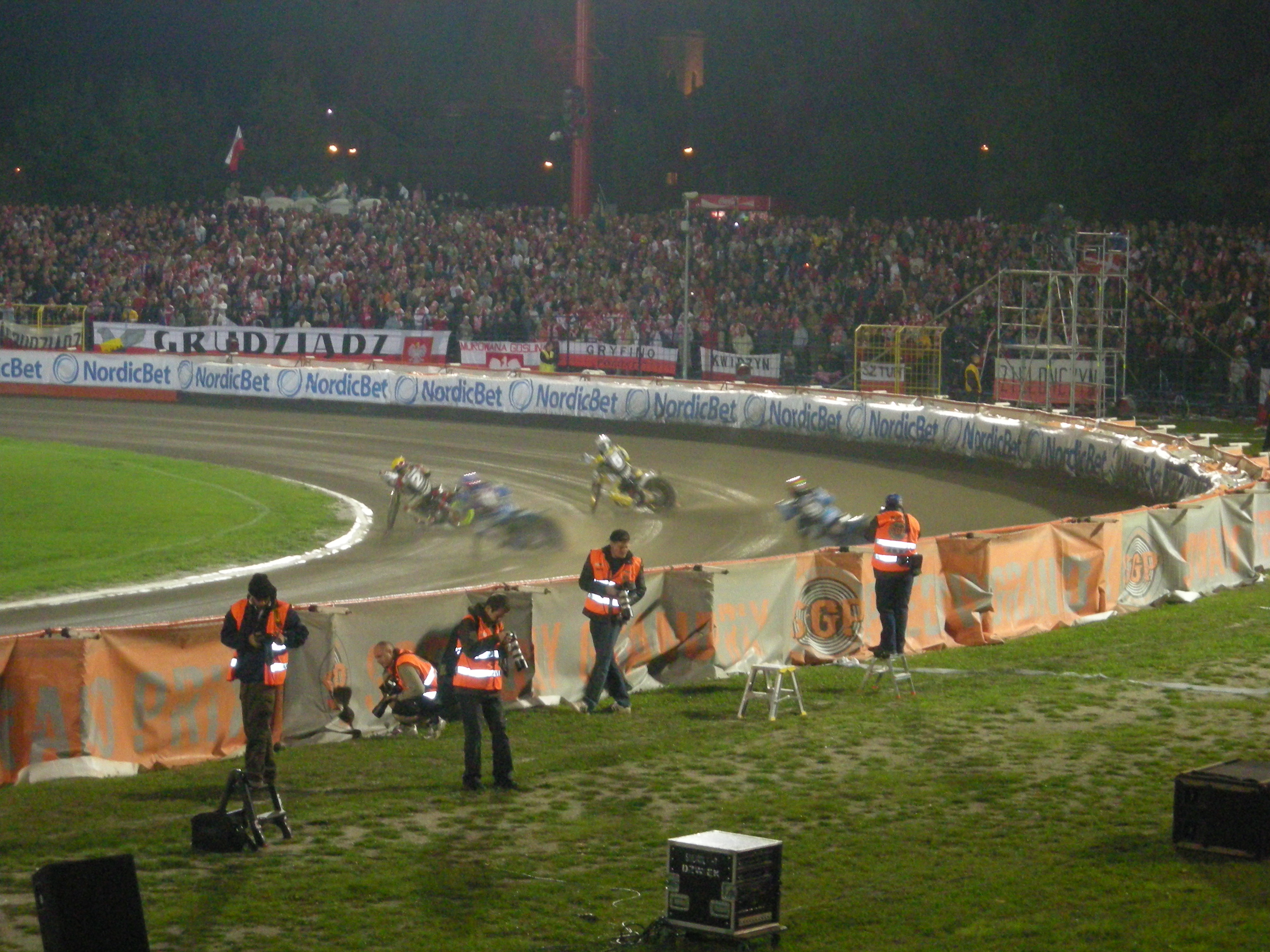
Heat 9 - Andersen (white), Adams (yellow), Harris (red) and Holta (blue).

1. Nicholls, Jaguś, Andersen, Iversen
2. Crump, Harris, Buczkowski, Dryml, Lindgren (T/-)
3. N.Pedersen, Hancock, Adams, Kasprzak
4. Gollob, Jonsson, B.Pedersen, Holta
5. Gollob, Andersen, Crump, Kasprzak (E4)
6. N.Pedersen, Harris, Jonsson, Jaguś
7. Adams, Iversen, B.Pedersen, Lindgren
8. Nicholls, Hancock, Holta, Dryml
9. Andersen, Adams, Harris, Holta
10. Jaguś, Crump, Hancock, B.Pedersen
11. Jonsson, Dryml, Kasprzak, Iversen
12. Gollob, N.Pedersen, Nicholls, Lindgren
13. Hancock, Andersen, Jonsson, Lindgren (E3)
14. Gollob, Jaguś, Adams, Dryml
15. N.Pedersen, Holta, Iversen, Crump
16. Kasprzak, B.Pedersen, Nicholls, Harris
17. N.Pedersen, Andersen, Dryml, B.Pedersen
18. Holta, Kasprzak, Jaguś, Lindgren
19. Gollob, Hancock, Iversen, Harris
20. Crump, Adams, Jonsson, Nicholls
  Semi-Finals:
21. Gollob, Nicholls, Andersen, Adams
22. N.Pedersen, Hancock, Jaguś, Crump
  Final:
23. Hancock (6 points), N.Pedersen (4), Gollob (2), Nicholls (0)

== The intermediate classification ==
Qualifies for next season's Grand Prix series
Full-time Grand Prix rider
Wild card, track reserve or qualified reserve

Pos.	Rider	Points	SVN (Slovenia)	EUR (Poland)	SWE (Sweden)	DEN (Denmark)	GBR (United Kingdom)	CZE (Czech Republic)	SCA (Sweden)	LAT (Latvia)	POL (Poland)	ITA (Italy)	FIN (Poland)
1	(Denmark) (1) Nicki Pedersen	155	17	16	16	20	11	22	14	18	21		
2	(Australia) (3) Jason Crump	127	10	8	12	18	22	17	12	19	9		
3	(United States) (6) Greg Hancock	120	8	20	6	10	20	13	12	13	18		
4	(Poland) (4) Tomasz Gollob	118	19	12	8	19	4	12	8	16	20		
5	(Denmark) (5) Hans N. Andersen	101	14	6	8	11	9	16	20	7	10		
6	(Australia) (2) Leigh Adams	98	5	20	9	8	7	10	21	9	9		
7	(Sweden) (10) Andreas Jonsson	79	12	9	8	9	8	9	6	10	8		
8	(Poland) (7) Rune Holta	63	5	4	17	7	6	9	5	4	6		
9	(United Kingdom) (8) Scott Nicholls	62	7	2	7	7	12	6	4	7	10		
10	(Sweden) (15) Fredrik Lindgren	59	7	7	22	3	2	4	7	7	0		
11	(United Kingdom) (9) Chris Harris	54	6	6	5	3	10	7	3	9	5		
12	(Denmark) (12) Niels Kristian Iversen	53	8	10	2	6	6	7	9	1	4		
13	(Denmark) (11) Bjarne Pedersen	49	4	–	–	7	14	7	6	7	4		
14	(Poland) (14) Krzysztof Kasprzak	44	6	3	5	3	4	1	9	7	6		
15	(Czech Republic) (13) Lukáš Dryml	35	9	2	3	1	1	4	5	7	3		
16	(Poland) (16) Jarosław Hampel	16	–	16	–	–	–	–	–	–	–		
17	(Denmark) (16) Kenneth Bjerre	11	–	–	–	11	–	–	–	–	–		
18	(Poland) (16) Wiesław Jaguś	9	–	–	–	–	–	–	–	–	9		
19	(Czech Republic) (16) (19) Luboš Tomíček, Jr.	8	–	3	5	–	–	0	–	–	–		
20	(Slovenia) (16) Matej Žagar	7	7	–	–	–	–	–	–	–	–		
21	(Sweden) (16) (17) Jonas Davidsson	7	–	–	7	–	–	–	ns	–	–		
22	(United Kingdom) (16) Edward Kennett	4	–	–	–	–	4	–	–	–	–		
23	(Sweden) (16) Peter Ljung	3	–	–	–	–	–	–	3	–	–		
24	(Latvia) (16) Grigory Laguta	2	–	–	–	–	–	–	–	2	–		
25	(Sweden) (18) Billy Forsberg	2	–	–	2	–	–	–	–	–	–		
26	(Denmark) (17) Nicolai Klindt	1	–	–	–	1	–	–	–	–	–		
27	(Poland) (17) (18) Krzysztof Buczkowski	1	–	ns	–	–	–	–	–	–	1		
28	(Sweden) (17) Sebastian Aldén	0	–	–	0	–	–	–	–	–	–		
29	(Latvia) (17) Maksims Bogdanovs	0	–	–	–	–	–	–	–	0	–		
Rider(s) not classified
	(Slovenia) (17) Izak Šantej	—	ns	–	–	–	–	–	–	–	–		
	(Poland) (17) Damian Baliński	—	–	ns	–	–	–	–	–	–	–		
	(United Kingdom) (17) Tai Woffinden	—	–	–	–	–	ns	–	–	–	–		
	(Czech Republic) (17) Adrian Rymel	—	–	–	–	–	–	ns	–	–	–		
	(Slovenia) (18) Denis Štojs	—	ns	–	–	–	–	–	–	–	–		
	(Denmark) (18) Patrick Hougaard	—	–	–	–	ns	–	–	–	–	–		
	(United Kingdom) (18) Simon Stead	—	–	–	–	–	ns	–	–	–	–		
	(Czech Republic) (18) Filip Šitera	—	–	–	–	–	–	ns	–	–	–		
	(Sweden) (18) Thomas H. Jonasson	—	–	–	–	–	–	–	ns	–	–		
	(Latvia) (18) Kasts Poudzuks	—	–	–	–	–	–	–	–	ns	–		
	(Poland) (18) Maciej Janowski	—	–	–	–	–	–	–	–	–	ns		
Pos.	Rider	Points	SVN (Slovenia)	EUR (Poland)	SWE (Sweden)	DEN (Denmark)	GBR (United Kingdom)	CZE (Czech Republic)	SCA (Sweden)	LAT (Latvia)	POL (Poland)	ITA (Italy)	FIN (Poland)

== See also ==
- Speedway Grand Prix
- List of Speedway Grand Prix riders
