= Lukáš Dryml =

Czech motorcycle speedway rider

- Born: 16 April 1981 (age 45); Pardubice, Czechoslovakia
- Nationality: Czech
- Website: www.teamdryml.co.uk

Career history

Czech Republic
- 1999-: Pardubice

Poland
- 1999: Rybnik
- 2000: Świętochłowice
- 2002: Gorzów
- 2003: Leszno
- 2006: Tarnów
- 2007: Częstochowa
- 2008: Ostrów
- 2009: Rzeszów
- 2010: Lublin

Great Britain
- 2000–2002, 2005–2006: Oxford Cheetahs
- 2003: Poole Pirates
- 2004–2005, 2007–2008: Peterborough Panthers
- 2009–2013: Eastbourne Eagles

Sweden
- 2002: Ornarna
- 2003–2004: Vetlanda
- 2005: Vargarna
- 2006–2008: Dackarna

Individual honours
- 2002: World Under-21 Champion
- 2000: European Under-19 Champion
- 2005: Czech Republic Champion

Team honours
- 2004, 2007: European Pairs Champion
- 2001, 2003: Elite League Champion
- 2004: Swedish Elitserien Champion
- 1999, 2000, 2001, 2002, 2004, 2013: Czech Div One Champion

Lukáš Dryml (born 16 April 1981 in Pardubice, Czechoslovakia) is a former international motorcycle speedway rider from the Czech Republic. He earned 20 international caps for the Czech Republic national speedway team and represented his nation in the Speedway World Cup.

== Career ==
Dryml and his older brother Aleš Dryml Jr. were introduced to speedway by their father Aleš Dryml Sr., who was a former international speedway rider.

Dryml came to the British speedway leagues in 2000 when he and his brother Ales joined the Oxford Cheetahs for the 2002 Elite League speedway season. The pair came into the Oxford side relatively unknown because they had only ridden in the Czech Republic and Poland at the time. Lukas had won the European U-19 Championship. However, the British Authorities gave them inflated averages of 7.50 and 5.00, which would not help Oxford's 2000 league challenge as they finished second from last.

The following season in 2001, Oxford brought in Leigh Adams as heat leader and retained the Dryml brothers on reduced averages, this combination was a winning one, as the three riders were instrumental in helping Oxford win the 2001 Elite League. Dryml finished runner-up to Dawid Kujawa in the 2001 World Under-21 Championship. Dryml went on to win to become the World Under-21 Champion in 2002.

Dryml has twice won the European Pairs Championship (2004 and 2007) with brother Aleš Jr. He will return to the Speedway Grand Prix series in 2008 after finishing second in the 2008 Speedway Grand Prix Qualification tournament.

Dryml signed a temporary contract to ride for the Eastbourne Eagles in 2009 after the Eagles encountered difficulties obtaining a British work permit for Russian rider Denis Gizatullin.

== Speedway Grand Prix results ==
2002 Speedway Grand Prix Final Championship standings (Riding No 14)
Race no.	Grand Prix	Pos.	Pts.	Heats	Draw No

2003 Speedway Grand Prix Final Championship standings (Riding No 10)
Race no.	Grand Prix	Pos.	Pts.	Heats	Draw No

2004 Speedway Grand Prix Final Championship standings (Riding No 13)
Race no.	Grand Prix	Pos.	Pts.	Heats	Draw No

2005 Speedway Grand Prix Final Championship standings (Riding No 18)
Race no.	Grand Prix	Pos.	Pts.	Heats	Draw No
6 /9	(Czech Republic) Czech Rep. SGP	18	-	-	18

2008 Speedway Grand Prix Final Championship standings (Riding No 13)
Race no.	Grand Prix	Pos.	Pts.	Heats	Draw No
1 /11	(Slovenia) Slovenian SGP				
2 /11	(Europe) European SGP				
3 /11	(Sweden) Swedish SGP				
4 /11	(Denmark) Danish SGP				
5 /11	(United Kingdom) British SGP				
6 /11	(Czech Republic) Czech Rep. SGP				
7 /11	(Sweden) Scandinavian SGP				
8 /11	(Latvia) Latvian SGP				
9 /11	(Poland) Polish SGP				
10 /11	(Italy) Italian SGP				
11 /11	(Germany) German SGP				

permanent speedway rider
wild card, track reserve or qualified reserve
rider not classified (track reserve who did not start)

== Career summary ==
=== World Under-21 Championship ===
- 2001 - Silver medal (11 points)
- 2002 - World Champion (14+3 points)

=== Speedway World Cup ===
- 2002 - 5 place (14 points)
- 2003 - 6 place (10 points in Race-Off)
- 2004 - 6 place (5 points in Race-Off)
- 2005 - 6 place (7 points in Race-Off)
- 2007 - 9 place (13 points in Qualifying Round 2)

=== European Under-19 Championship ===
- 1999 - 6 place (11 points)
- 2000 - European Champion (13 points)

=== European Pairs Championship ===
- 2004 - European Champion (track reserve in Final)
- 2005 - Silver medal (track reserve in Final)
- 2006 - 4 place (12 points in Semi-Final A)
- 2007 - European Champion ( points)

== See also ==
- List of Speedway Grand Prix riders
- Czech Republic speedway team
