= 2008 Speedway Grand Prix of Europe =

(Poland) 2008 Speedway Grand Prix of Europe
- FIM BZ WBK BANK European Speedway Grand Prix

Information
- Date: 10 May 2008
- City: (Poland) Leszno
- Event: 2 of 11 (102)
- Referee: (Germany) Frank Ziegler
- Jury President: (Denmark) Joergen L. Jensen

Stadium details
- Stadium: Alfred Smoczyk Stadium
- Capacity: 25,000
- Length: 330 m (360 yd)
- Track: speedway track

SGP Results
- Attendance: 24,000
- Best Time: (Poland) Tomasz Gollob; 59.44 secs (in Heat 4)
- (gold) Winner: (Australia) Leigh Adams
- (silver) Runner-up: (United States) Greg Hancock
- (bronze) 3rd place: (Denmark) Nicki Pedersen

The 2008 Speedway Grand Prix of Europe was the second race of the 2008 Speedway Grand Prix season. It took place on May 10 in the Alfred Smoczyk Stadium in Leszno, Poland. The main sponsor was the commercial bank Bank Zachodni WBK.

The Grand Prind was won by Leigh Adams from Australia. It was the 7th Grand Prix win of his career. In the final, Adams beat American Greg Hancock and defending World Champion Danish Nicki Pedersen.

== Riders ==
The Speedway Grand Prix Commission nominated Jarosław Hampel as wild card, and Damian Baliński and Krzysztof Buczkowski as track reserves. The draw was made on April 29 at the Fédération Internationale de Motocyclisme Headquarters in Mies, Switzerland. Because of an injury, Bjarne Pedersen was replaced by Luboš Tomíček, Jr. Adams, Kasprzak, Hampel and Baliński are all riding for Unia Leszno, whose home track is at the Alfred Smoczyk Stadium, in the 2008 season in Poland.

- Draw No 1: (Denmark) (11) Bjarne Pedersen → (Czech Republic) (19) Luboš Tomíček, Jr.

== Heat details ==
Placing	Draw	Rider	Total	1	2	3	4	5	6	7	8	9	10	11	12	13	14	15	16	17	18	19	20	Pts	Pos	21	22	23
1	9	(Australia) (2) Leigh Adams	20			2		3						0					3		3			11	4	3		3
2	7	(United States) (6) Greg Hancock	20		3					3					3	3					2			14	1	2		2
3	3	(Denmark) (1) Nicki Pedersen	16	3						2				1				3				3		12	3		2	1
4	8	(Poland) (16) Jarosław Hampel	16		2						2			3			3			3				13	2		3	0
5	16	(Poland) (4) Tomasz Gollob	12				3				3	3						1			1			11	5		1
6	14	(Denmark) (12) Niels Kristian Iversen	10				2		0					2		2							3	9	7	1
7	6	(Australia) (3) Jason Crump	8		0				2			2							2			2		8	8		X
8	10	(Sweden) (10) Andreas Jonsson	9			3			3						1			0		2				9	6	0
9	5	(Sweden) (15) Fredrik Lindgren	7		1			1					1					2					2	7	9
10	12	(Denmark) (5) Hans N. Andersen	6			0					1		3			1						1		6	10
11	2	(United Kingdom) (9) Chris Harris	6	2					1				2				1				0			6	11
12	13	(Poland) (7) Rune Holta	4				0	0							2		2					0		4	12
13	1	(Czech Republic) (19) Luboš Tomíček, Jr.	3	0				2				0				0				1				3	13
14	11	(Poland) (14) Krzysztof Kasprzak	3			1				0		1					0						1	3	14
15	4	(Czech Republic) (13) Lukáš Dryml	2	1							0				0				1				0	2	15
16	15	(United Kingdom) (8) Scott Nicholls	2				1			1			0						0	E4				2	16
17	17	(Poland) (17) Damian Baliński	-																					-	17
18	18	(Poland) (18) Krzysztof Buczkowski	-																					-	18
Placing	Draw	Rider	Total	1	2	3	4	5	6	7	8	9	10	11	12	13	14	15	16	17	18	19	20	Pts	Pos	21	22	23

e: retired or mechanical failure • m: exclusion for exceeding two minute time allowance • t: exclusion for touching the tapes • x: other exclusion • f: fell
ns: non-starter • nc: non-classify
Semi-finals: Heat 21: Riders placed 1st, 4th, 6th & 7th in the intermediate classification (after 20 heats)
Heat 22: Riders placed 2nd, 3rd, 5th & 8th in the intermediate classification (after 20 heats)
Big Final (heat 23): The first and second placed riders in each of the Semi-Finals

gate A – inside	gate B	gate C	gate D – outside

=== Heat after heat ===
1. (60.91) Pedersen, Harris, Dryml, Tomicek
2. (60.82) Hancock, Hampel, Lindgren, Crump
3. (60.63) Jonsson, Adams, Kasprzak, Andersen
4. (59.44) Gollob, Iversen, Nicholls, Holta
5. (60.62) Adams, Tomicek, Lindgren, Holta
6. (59.94) Jonsson, Crump, Harris, Iversen
7. (60.10) Hancock, Pedersen, Nicholls, Kasprzak
8. (60.09) Gollob, Hampel, Andersen, Dryml
9. (60.47) Gollob, Crump, Kasprzak, Tomicek
10. (60.85) Andersen, Harris, Lindgren, Nicholls
11. (60.04) Hampel, Iversen, Pedersen, Adams
12. (60.25) Hancock, Holta, Jonsson, Dryml
13. (60.96) Hancock, Iversen, Andersen, Tomicek
14. (60.38) Hampel, Holta, Harris, Kasprzak
15. (60.45) Pedersen, Lindgren, Gollob, Jonsson
16. (60.19) Adams, Crump, Dryml, Nicholls
17. (60.28) Hampel, Jonsson, Tomicek, Nicholls (E4)
18. (60.38) Adams, Hancock, Gollob, Harris
19. (60.67) Pedersen, Crump, Andersen, Holta
20. (61.14) Iversen, Lindgren, Kasprzak, Dryml
  Semi-Finals:
21. (60.73) Adams, Hancock, Iversen, Jonsson
22. (60.19) Hampel, Pedersen, Gollob, Crump (X)
  Pedersen crashes on final lap due to collision to Crump. Crump excluded. Heat was no-restarted.
  Final:
23. (60.23) Adams (6), Hancock (4), Pedersen (2), Hampel (0)

== The intermediate classification ==
Qualifies for next season's Grand Prix series
Full-time Grand Prix rider
Wild card, track reserve or qualified reserve

Pos.	Rider	Points	SVN (Slovenia)	EUR (Poland)	SWE (Sweden)	DEN (Denmark)	GBR (United Kingdom)	CZE (Czech Republic)	SCA (Sweden)	LAT (Latvia)	POL (Poland)	ITA (Italy)	FIN (Poland)
1	(Denmark) (1) Nicki Pedersen	33	17	16									
2	(Poland) (4) Tomasz Gollob	31	19	12									
3	(United States) (6) Greg Hancock	28	8	20									
4	(Australia) (2) Leigh Adams	25	5	20									
5	(Sweden) (10) Andreas Jonsson	21	12	9									
6	(Denmark) (5) Hans N. Andersen	20	14	6									
7	(Australia) (3) Jason Crump	18	10	8									
8	(Denmark) (12) Niels Kristian Iversen	18	8	10									
9	(Poland) (16) Jarosław Hampel	16	–	16									
10	(Sweden) (15) Fredrik Lindgren	14	7	7									
11	(United Kingdom) (9) Chris Harris	12	6	6									
12	(Czech Republic) (13) Lukáš Dryml	11	9	2									
13	(Poland) (7) Rune Holta	9	5	4									
14	(United Kingdom) (8) Scott Nicholls	9	7	2									
15	(Poland) (14) Krzysztof Kasprzak	9	6	3									
16	(Slovenia) (16) Matej Žagar	7	7	–									
17	(Denmark) (11) Bjarne Pedersen	4	4	–									
18	(Czech Republic) (19) Luboš Tomíček, Jr.	3	–	3									
Rider(s) not classified
	(Slovenia) (17) Izak Šantej	—	ns	–									
	(Poland) (17) Damian Baliński	—	–	ns									
	(Slovenia) (18) Denis Štojs	—	ns	–									
	(Poland) (18) Krzysztof Buczkowski	—	–	ns									
Pos.	Rider	Points	SVN (Slovenia)	EUR (Poland)	SWE (Sweden)	DEN (Denmark)	GBR (United Kingdom)	CZE (Czech Republic)	SCA (Sweden)	LAT (Latvia)	POL (Poland)	ITA (Italy)	FIN (Poland)

== See also ==
- Speedway Grand Prix
- List of Speedway Grand Prix riders
