= 2008 Speedway Grand Prix of Slovenia =

- FIM Slovenian Speedway Grand Prix

Information
- Date: 26 April 2008
- City: (Slovenia) Krško
- Event: 1 of 11 (101)
- Referee: (United Kingdom) Anthony Steele
- Jury President: (Germany) Wolfgang Glas

Stadium details
- Stadium: Matija Gubec Stadium
- Capacity: 12,000
- Length: 387.7 m (424.0 yd)
- Track: speedway track

SGP Results
- Best Time: (Poland) Rune Holta; 65.18 secs (in Heat 1)
- (gold) Winner: (Poland) Tomasz Gollob
- (silver) Runner-up: (Denmark) Nicki Pedersen
- (bronze) 3rd place: (Denmark) Hans N. Andersen

The 2008 Speedway Grand Prix of Slovenia was the first race of the 2008 Speedway Grand Prix season. It took place on April 26 at the Matija Gubec Stadium in Krško, Slovenia.

Slovenian SGP was won by Tomasz Gollob from Poland. It was the 12th SGP win of his career. In the final, Gollob beat Danes Nicki Pedersen and Hans N. Andersen.

== Riders ==
The Speedway Grand Prix Commission nominated Matej Žagar as Wild Card, and Izak Šantej and Jernej Kolenko both as Track Reserves. The Draw was made on April 15 in FIM Headquarters in Mies, Switzerland. Denis Štojs later replaced the injured Jernej Kolenko.

- (Slovenia) (18) Jernej Kolenko → (Slovenia) (18) Denis Štojs

== Heat details ==
Placing	Draw	Rider	Total	1	2	3	4	5	6	7	8	9	10	11	12	13	14	15	16	17	18	19	20	Pts	Pos	21	22	23
1	9	(Poland) (4) Tomasz Gollob	19			0		2						2					3		3			10	2		3	3
2	11	(Denmark) (1) Nicki Pedersen	17			3				2		3					1						1	10	4	3		2
3	15	(Denmark) (5) Hans N. Andersen	14				0			3			3						2	2				10	3		2	1
4	8	(Sweden) (10) Andreas Jonsson	12		1						3			3			0			3				10	1	2		T
5	16	(Australia) (3) Jason Crump	10				1				1	2						3			2			9	5		1
6	7	(Czech Republic) (13) Lukáš Dryml	9		3					E4					2	3					Fx			8	7	1
7	14	(Denmark) (12) Niels Kristian Iversen	8				3		2					0		0							3	8	6	0
8	10	(United States) (6) Greg Hancock	8			2			3						1			1		1				8	8		0
9	13	(Slovenia) (16) Matej Žagar	7				2	3							0		2					F4		7	9
10	12	(Sweden) (15) Fredrik Lindgren	7			1					0		1			2						3		7	10
11	3	(United Kingdom) (8) Scott Nicholls	7	1						1				1				2				2		7	11
12	2	(Poland) (14) Krzysztof Kasprzak	6	2					0				0				3				1			6	12
13	6	(United Kingdom) (9) Chris Harris	6		2				1			1							1			1		6	13
14	4	(Australia) (2) Leigh Adams	5	0							2				3				0				0	5	14
15	1	(Poland) (7) Rune Holta	5	3				1				0				1				0				5	15
16	5	(Denmark) (11) Bjarne Pedersen	4		0			0					2					0					2	4	16
17	17	(Slovenia) (17) Izak Šantej	-																					-	17
18	18	(Slovenia) (18) Denis Štojs	-																					-	18
Placing	Draw	Rider	Total	1	2	3	4	5	6	7	8	9	10	11	12	13	14	15	16	17	18	19	20	Pts	Pos	21	22	23

e: retired or mechanical failure • m: exclusion for exceeding two minute time allowance • t: exclusion for touching the tapes • x: other exclusion • f: fell
ns: non-starter • nc: non-classify
Semi-finals: Heat 21: Riders placed 1st, 4th, 6th & 7th in the intermediate classification (after 20 heats)
Heat 22: Riders placed 2nd, 3rd, 5th & 8th in the intermediate classification (after 20 heats)
Big Final (heat 23): The first and second placed riders in each of the Semi-Finals

gate A – inside	gate B	gate C	gate D – outside

=== Heat after heat ===
1. (65,18) Holta, Kasprzak, Nicholls, Adams
2. (65,86) Dryml, Harris, Jonsson, B.Pedersen
3. (66,14) N.Pedersen, Hancock, Lindgren, Gollob
4. (66,41) Iversen, Žagar, Crump, Andersen
5. (66,53) Žagar, Gollob, Holta, B.Pedersen
6. (66,95) Hancock, Iversen, Harris, Kasprzak
7. (67,26) Andersen, N.Pedersen, Nicholls, L.Dryml (E4)
8. (66,96) Jonsson, Adams, Crump, Lindgren
9. (67,64) N.Pedersen, Crump, Harris, Holta
10. (68,30) Andersen, B.Pedersen, Lindgren, Kasprzak
11. (67,27) Jonsson, Gollob, Nicholls, Iversen
12. (67,75) Adams, Dryml, Hancock, Žagar
  Heavy rain began during the interval, difficult conditions gave the inside gates an advantage.
13. (71,61) Dryml, Lindgren, Holta, Iversen
14. (72,59) Kasprzak, Žagar, N.Pedersen, Jonsson
15. (72,03) Crump, Nicholls, Hancock, B.Pedersen
16. (72,38) Gollob, Andersen, Harris, Adams
17. (71,17) Jonsson, Andersen, Hancock, Holta
18. (71,01) Gollob, Crump, Kasprzak, Dryml (F/X)
  Race stopped, Dryml excluded after bailing and slamming into the wall late in the race; bad conditions, very wet
19. (71,78) Lindgren, Nicholls, Harris, Žagar (F4)
20. (71,26) Iversen, B.Pedersen, N.Pedersen, Adams
  Semi-Finals:
21. (71,56) N.Pedersen, Jonsson, Dryml, Iversen
22. (70,68) Gollob, Andersen, Crump, Hancock
  Final:
23. (71,00) Gollob (6), N.Pedersen (4), Andersen (2), Jonsson (T) (0)
  False start, Jonsson touches tapes and is excluded; race re-started

== The intermediate classification ==
Qualifies for next season's Grand Prix series
Full-time Grand Prix rider
Wild card, track reserve or qualified reserve

Pos.	Rider	Points	SVN (Slovenia)	EUR (Poland)	SWE (Sweden)	DEN (Denmark)	GBR (United Kingdom)	CZE (Czech Republic)	SCA (Sweden)	LAT (Latvia)	POL (Poland)	ITA (Italy)	FIN (Poland)
1	(Poland) (4) Tomasz Gollob	19	19										
2	(Denmark) (1) Nicki Pedersen	17	17										
3	(Denmark) (5) Hans N. Andersen	14	14										
4	(Sweden) (10) Andreas Jonsson	12	12										
5	(Australia) (3) Jason Crump	10	10										
6	(Czech Republic) (13) Lukáš Dryml	9	9										
7	(United States) (6) Greg Hancock	8	8										
8	(Denmark) (12) Niels Kristian Iversen	8	8										
9	(United Kingdom) (8) Scott Nicholls	7	7										
10	(Sweden) (15) Fredrik Lindgren	7	7										
11	(Slovenia) (16) Matej Žagar	7	7										
12	(United Kingdom) (9) Chris Harris	6	6										
16	(Poland) (14) Krzysztof Kasprzak	6	6										
14	(Australia) (2) Leigh Adams	5	5										
15	(Poland) (7) Rune Holta	5	5										
16	(Denmark) (11) Bjarne Pedersen	4	4										
Rider(s) not classified
	(Slovenia) (17) Izak Šantej	—	ns										
	(Slovenia) (18) Denis Štojs	—	ns										
Pos.	Rider	Points	SVN (Slovenia)	EUR (Poland)	SWE (Sweden)	DEN (Denmark)	GBR (United Kingdom)	CZE (Czech Republic)	SCA (Sweden)	LAT (Latvia)	POL (Poland)	ITA (Italy)	FIN (Poland)

== See also ==
- Speedway Grand Prix
- List of Speedway Grand Prix riders
