= Krzysztof Buczkowski =

Polish speedway rider

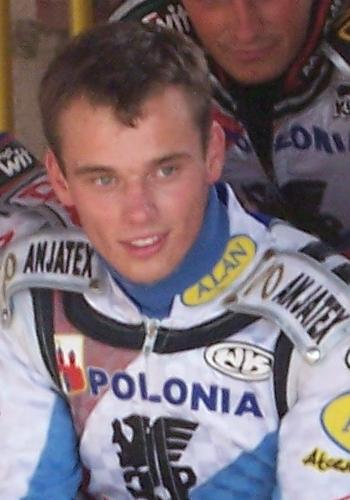
- Born: 30 April 1986 (age 40); Grudziądz, Poland
- Nationality: Polish

Career history

Poland
- 2002–2004, 2010–2011, 2015–2020: Grudziądz
- 2005–2009, 2012–2013, 2024–2025: Bydgoszcz
- 2014: Tarnów
- 2021: Lublin
- 2022–2023: Zielona Góra

Sweden
- 2005, 2023–2025: Indianerna
- 2006: Getingarna
- 2006: Vargarna
- 2007–2009, 2013, 2018, 2021: Smederna
- 2009, 2015: Dackarna
- 2010, 2016: Rospiggarna
- 2011–2012: Valsarna
- 2017: Piraterna
- 2019: Vastervik
- 2022: Masarna

Great Britain
- 2007: Reading
- 2010–2013: Peterborough
- 2014: Leicester
- 2016: Poole

Denmark
- 2006, 2008: Outrup
- 2010: Holstebro
- 2011, 2017: Holsted
- 2013: Munkebo

Team honours
- 2006, 2007: Under-21 World Cup Winner
- 2018: Swedish Elitserien Champion

Krzysztof Buczkowski (born 30 April 1986 in Grudziądz, Poland) is a motorcycle speedway rider from Poland. He earned one international cap for the Poland speedway team.

== Career ==
Buczkowski has ridden for the Polish national junior team.

Buczkowski started speedway in 2002 with GKM Grudziądz and rode for them until the end of 2004. In 2005, he joined Polonia Bydgoszcz until the end of 2009, when he returned to Grudziądz. After a third stint with the club from 2013 to 2020, he joined KM Cross Lublin and then Falubaz Zielona Góra.

Buczkowski rode for Reading Racers, Peterborough Panthers, Leicester Lions and Poole Pirates in the British speedway leagues.

In 2025, Buczkowski re-joined Polonia Bydgoszcz who he had ridden for from 2005 to 2009 and secured a shock silver medal on his home track at the Criterium of Aces.

== Results ==
=== Speedway Grand Prix ===
2007 Speedway Grand Prix Final Championship standings (Riding No 17)
Race no.	Grand Prix	Pos.	Pts.	Heats	Draw No
9 /11	(Poland) Polish SGP	17	-	-	17

2008 Speedway Grand Prix Final Championship standings (Riding No 18)
Race no.	Grand Prix	Pos.	Pts.	Heats	Draw No
2 /11	(Europe) European SGP	18	-	-	18
9 /11	(Poland) Polish SGP	16	1	(1)	17

permanent speedway rider
wild card, track reserve or qualified reserve
rider not classified (track reserve who did not start)

=== World Under-21 Championship ===
- 2007 - 17th place in Semi-Final B (injury)

=== Team Under-21 World Cup ===
- 2006 - World Champion (5 points)
- 2007 - World Champion (11 points)

=== Other ===
European Under-19 Championship=

- 2004 - 9th place
- 2005 - 6th place

Polish Individual Championship

- 2004 - 11 place in Quarter-Final B
- 2005 - 9 place in Quarter-Final B
- 2006 - 17th place (O heat as track reserve)
- 2007 - injury in Quarter-Final A

Polish Under-21 Individual Championship

- 2004 - 7-8th place in Semi-Final A
- 2005 - 11th place (6 points)
- 2006 - 5th place (11 points)
- 2007 - injury in Semi-Final B

Polish Pairs Championship

- 2003 - 7th place in Semi-Final B
- 2004 - 4th place (1 point)

Polish Under-21 Pairs Championship

- 2004 - 3rd place in Semi-Final C
- 2005 - 6th place (6 points)
- 2006 - Silver medal (14 points)

Polish Team Championship

- 2002 - 8th place in First League with GKM Grudziądz
- 2003 - 1st place in Second League with GTŻ Primus Grudziądz
- 2005 - 5 place in First League with Kunter GTŻ Grudziądz (and 1st place in First-Second League Race-Off)
- 2005 - Silver medal with Budlex-Polonia Bydgoszcz
- 2006 - Bronze medal Budlex-Polonia Bydgoszcz
- 2007 - with Polonia Bydgoszcz (last round October 7)

Polish Under-21 Team Championship

- 2002 - 3rd in Qualification Group B
- 2003 - 4th place (5 points)
- 2004 - 3rd in Qualification Group C
- 2005 - 4th place (7 points)
- 2006 - 2nd in Qualification Group C
- 2007 - Last round in Qualification Group A will be on September 15

Golden Helmet

- 2006 - 12th place (5 points)

Silver Helmet (U-21)

- 2003 - 6th place (8 points)
- 2004 - 9th place (6 points)
- 2005 - 9th place (7 points)
- 2006 - 4th place (10 points)

'Bronze Helmet (U-19)

- 2003 - 5th place (10 points)
- 2004 - Bronze medal (13+F/X points)
- 2005 - 8th place (7 points)

== See also ==
- Poland national speedway team
- List of Speedway Grand Prix riders
