= Luboš Tomíček Jr. =

Czech international speedway rider (born 1986)

Luboš Tomíček Jr
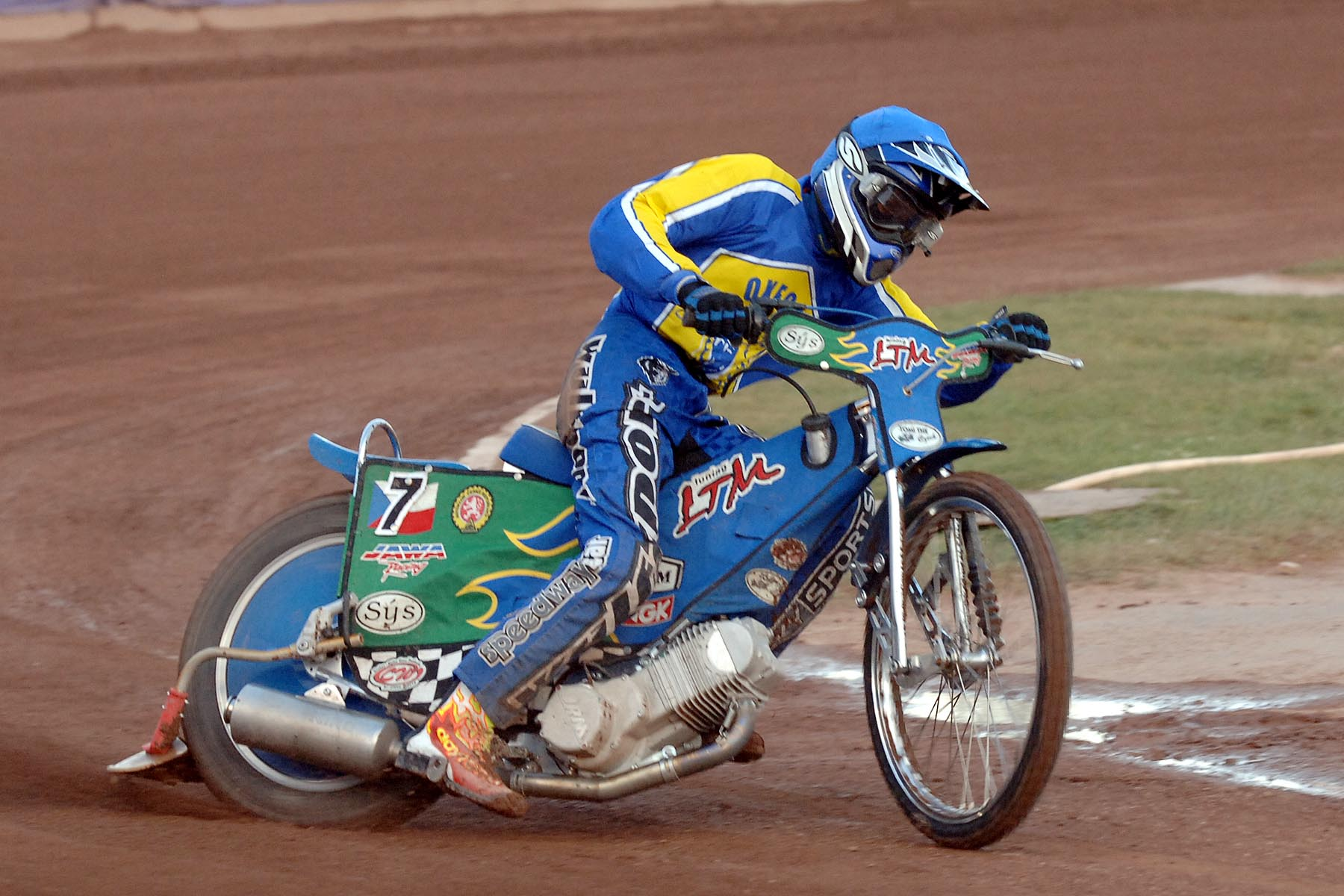
- Tomíček riding for Oxford in 2007
- Born: 14 March 1986 (age 40); Prague, Czech Republic
- Nationality: Czech

Career history

Great Britain
- 2003, 2005-2007: Oxford Cheetahs
- 2004-2005: Newcastle Diamonds
- 2007-2008: Lakeside Hammers
- 2010: Somerset Rebels
- 2010: Stoke Potters
- 2012: Berwick Bandits

Poland
- 2006, 2009: Lublin
- 2007: Ostrów
- 2008: Opole

Sweden
- 2008: Rospiggarna

Individual honours
- 2007: Team U21 World Championship bronze
- 2007: U21 World individual finalist
- 2007: 1st Czech pairs

Luboš Tomíček (born 14 March 1986 in Prague, Czech Republic) is a former motorcycle speedway rider from the Czech Republic. He earned four international caps for the Czech Republic national speedway team.

== Career ==
Tomíček comes from a three-generation motorsport family; his grandfather and father Luboš Tomíček Sr. were also professional speedway riders.

In 2003, Tomíček made his British league debut after riding four times for Oxford Cheetahs during the 2003 Elite League speedway season. The following season he joined Newcastle Diamonds and rode for them for two seasons.

After a short loan spell with Newcastle, Tomíček returned to Oxford in 2005, spending three seasons with them from 2005 to 2007. In 2007, he reached the final of the 2007 Speedway Under-21 World Championship and won a bronze medal at the Team Speedway Under-21 World Championship.

The following season, Tomíček appeared in the 2008 Speedway Grand Prix series and signed for Lakeside Hammers, where he helped the team finish second in the 2008 Elite League speedway season.

Tomíček won the league with his Prague club in 2012 and had a final season in Britain with the Berwick Bandits, but retired after the 2012 season due to private reasons.

== Speedway Grand Prix results ==
2006 Speedway Grand Prix Final Championship standings (Riding No 17)
Race no.	Grand Prix	Pos.	Pts.	Heats	Draw No
8 /10	(Czech Republic) Czech Rep. SGP	14	4	(1,1,2)	17

2007 Speedway Grand Prix Final Championship standings (Riding No 16)
Race no.	Grand Prix	Pos.	Pts.	Heats	Draw No
6 /11	(Czech Republic) Czech Rep. SGP	14	4	(2,1,0,1,0)	2

2008 Speedway Grand Prix Final Championship standings (Riding No 19)
Race no.	Grand Prix	Pos.	Pts.	Heats	Draw No
2 /11	(Europe) European SGP	13	3	(0,2,0,0,1)	1
3 /11	(Sweden) Swedish SGP	13	5	(0,2,1,0,2)	13

== Honours ==
- Individual World Championship (Speedway Grand Prix):
  - 2006 - 22nd place (4 points in 1 GP)
  - 2007 - 26th place (4 points in 1 GP)
  - 2008 - 19th place (8 points in 2 GP)
- Speedway Under-21 World Championship:
  - 2006 (Italy) Terenzano - track reserve
  - 2007 (Poland) Ostrów Wlkp. - 15th place (2 point)
- Speedway World Cup:
  - 2008 (United Kingdom) - 7th place (4 points in Event 2)
- Team Speedway Under-21 World Championship:
  - 2005 (Czech Republic) Pardubice - 4th place (2 points)
  - 2007 (Germany) Abensberg - Bronze medal (6 points)
- European Individual Speedway Junior Championship:
  - 2003 (Germany) Pocking - 13th place (5 points)
  - 2004 (Poland) Rybnik - 11th place (6 points)
  - 2005 (Czech Republic) Mšeno - 12th place (5 points)
- European Speedway Club Champions' Cup:
  - 2004 (Slovenia) Ljubljana - 4th place (8 points)
  - 2007 (Ukraine) Miskolc - 4th place (5 points)
- Individual Czech Championship:
  - 2006 (Czech Republic) - 4th place
  - 2007 (Czech Republic) - 3rd place
- Individual U-21 Czech Championship:
  - 2001 (Czech Republic) - 5th place
  - 2002 (Czech Republic) - 4th place
