= Sebastian Aldén =

Swedish motorcycle speedway rider

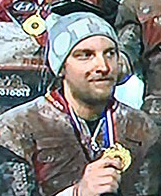
- Aldén celebrating with the Swindon Robins in 2012
- Born: 7 November 1985 (age 41); Västerås, Sweden
- Nationality: Swedish

Career history

Sweden
- 2003: Gasarna
- 2003–2006, 2008, 2011–2013: Masarna
- 2007: Dackarna
- 2010: Rospiggarna
- 2012–2013: Hammarby

Poland
- 2004, 2009–2011: Rawicz
- 2006: Gniezno
- 2007: Zielona Góra
- 2008: Rybnik

Great Britain
- 2005–2008, 2012: Swindon Robins
- 2011–2013, 2016: Berwick Bandits
- 2013: King's Lynn Stars

Denmark
- 2007: Slangerup

Team honours
- 2012: Elite League
- 2008: Elite Shield Winner
- 2012: Premier League Fours Champion

Sebastian Carl Aldén (born 7 November 1985 in Västerås, Sweden) is a triathlete and former motorcycle speedway rider from Sweden.

== Career ==
Aldén started racing in the British leagues during the 2005 Elite League speedway season, when riding for the Swindon Robins.

Aldén sustained a broken heel in the Robins' Elite League fixture against Belle Vue in July 2008. He recovered and returned for Swindon later in the season but broke his collarbone in another crash at Coventry and was unable to ride for the Robins in the Elite League play-offs.

Aldén was part of the Berwick Bandits team that won the Premier League Four-Team Championship, held on 15 July 2012, at the East of England Arena. That same season, he rode a few times for Swindon and helped them win the 2012 Elite League.

In 2013, Aldén rode for the King's Lynn Stars in the British Elite League.

In May 2016, during a meeting against the team Sheffield Tigers, Aldén suffered a neck fracture in a crash. After the crash he began to participate in triathlons. In 2022, he qualified for the Ironman World Championship but did not participate.
