= 2007 Speedway Grand Prix of Poland =

- FIM Bydgoszcz Speedway Grand Prix of Poland

Information
- Date: 8 September 2007
- City: (Poland) Bydgoszcz
- Event: 9 of 11 (98)
- Referee: (Sweden) Krister Gardell
- Jury President: (Germany) W. Glas

Stadium details
- Stadium: Polonia Stadium
- Capacity: 18,000
- Length: 348 m (381 yd)
- Track: speedway track

SGP Results
- Attendance: 20,000
- Best Time: (Poland) Tomasz Gollob; 64.17 secs (in Heat 23)
- (gold) Winner: (Poland) Tomasz Gollob
- (silver) Runner-up: (Poland) Krzysztof Kasprzak
- (bronze) 3rd place: (Denmark) Nicki Pedersen

The 2007 Speedway Grand Prix of Poland was the ninth race of the 2007 Speedway Grand Prix season. It took place on 8 September in the Polonia Stadium in Bydgoszcz, Poland.

== Starting positions draw ==
1. (2) Greg Hancock (United States)
2. (15) Chris Harris (United Kingdom)
3. (5) Leigh Adams (Australia)
4. (6) Hans N. Andersen (Denmark)
5. (13) Wiesław Jaguś (Poland)
6. (7) Matej Žagar (Slovenia)
7. (10) Antonio Lindbäck (Sweden)
8. (9) Jarosław Hampel (Poland)
9. (4) Andreas Jonsson (Sweden)
10. (8) Tomasz Gollob (Poland)
11. (14) Rune Holta (Poland)
12. (12) Bjarne Pedersen (Denmark)
13. (16) Krzysztof Kasprzak (Poland)
14. (11) Scott Nicholls (United Kingdom)
15. (1) Jason Crump (Australia)
16. (3) Nicki Pedersen (Denmark)
17. (17) Krzysztof Buczkowski (Poland)
18. (18) Adrian Miedziński (Poland)

== Heat details ==
Placing	Draw	Rider	Total	1	2	3	4	5	6	7	8	9	10	11	12	13	14	15	16	17	18	19	20	Pts	Pos	21	22	23
1	10	(Poland) (8) Tomasz Gollob	21			2			3						2			2		3				12	2		3	3
2	13	(Poland) (16) Krzysztof Kasprzak	17				3	0							3		3					2		11	3		2	2
3	16	(Denmark) (3) Nicki Pedersen	19				2				3	3						3			3			14	1	3		1
4	9	(Sweden) (4) Andreas Jonsson	11			1		3						0					3		2			9	6	2		0
5	8	(Poland) (9) Jarosław Hampel	11		3						2			3			0			2				10	5		1
6	11	(Poland) (14) Rune Holta	10			0				3		2					2						3	10	4	0
7	3	(Australia) (5) Leigh Adams	9	3						1				1				0				3		8	7	1
8	12	(Denmark) (12) Bjarne Pedersen	8			3					1		3			1						0		8	8		0
9	15	(Australia) (1) Jason Crump	7				1			2			1						2	1				7	9
10	7	(Sweden) (10) Antonio Lindbäck	5		0					0					1	3					1			5	10
11	1	(United States) (2) Greg Hancock	5	1				2				0				2				0				5	11
12	2	(United Kingdom) (15) Chris Harris	5	0					2				2				1				F			5	12
13	5	(Poland) (13) Wiesław Jaguś	5		2			1					0					1					1	5	13
14	14	(United Kingdom) (11) Scott Nicholls	4				0		0					2		0							2	4	14
15	6	(Slovenia) (7) Matej Žagar	4		1				1			1							0			1		4	15
16	4	(Denmark) (6) Hans N. Andersen	3	2							X				0				1				0	3	16
17	17	(Poland) (17) Krzysztof Buczkowski	-																					-	17
18	18	(Poland) (18) Adrian Miedziński	-																					-	18
Placing	Draw	Rider	Total	1	2	3	4	5	6	7	8	9	10	11	12	13	14	15	16	17	18	19	20	Pts	Pos	21	22	23

e: retired or mechanical failure • m: exclusion for exceeding two minute time allowance • t: exclusion for touching the tapes • x: other exclusion • f: fell
ns: non-starter • nc: non-classify
Semi-finals: Heat 21: Riders placed 1st, 4th, 6th & 7th in the intermediate classification (after 20 heats)
Heat 22: Riders placed 2nd, 3rd, 5th & 8th in the intermediate classification (after 20 heats)
Big Final (heat 23): The first and second placed riders in each of the Semi-Finals

gate A – inside	gate B	gate C	gate D – outside

=== Heat after heat ===
1. (64,97) Adams, Andersen, Hancock, Harris
2. (66,63) Hampel, Jaguś, Zagar, Lindbaeck
3. (65,22) B.Pedersen, Gollob, Jonsson, Holta
4. (64,56) Kasprzak, N.Pedersen, Crump, Nicholls
5. (64,44) Jonsson, Hancock, Jaguś, Kasprzak
6. (64,38) Gollob, Harris, Zagar, Nicholls
7. (64,69) Holta, Crump, Adams, Lindbaeck
8. (65,07) N.Pedersen, Hampel, B.Pedersen, Andersen (F/X)
9. (64,78) N.Pedersen, Holta, Zagar, Hancock
10. (65,35) B.Pedersen, Harris, Crump, Jaguś
11. (64,53) Hampel, Nicholls, Adams, Jonsson
12. (64,75) Kasprzak, Gollob, Lindbaeck, Andersen
13. (66,59) Lindbaeck, Hancock, B.Pedersen, Nicholls
14. (66,13) Kasprzak, Holta, Harris, Hampel
15. (65,00) N.Pedersen, Gollob, Jaguś, Adams
16. (64,81) Jonsson, Crump, Andersen, Zagar
17. (65,72) Gollob, Hampel, Crump, Hancock
18. (65,75) N.Pedersen, Jonsson, Lindbaeck, Harris (F4)
19. (65,09) Adams, Kasprzak, Zagar, B.Pedersen
20. (65,29) Holta, Nicholls, Jaguś, Andersen
  Semi-Final:
21. (64,25) N.Pedersen, Jonsson, Adams, Holta
22. (64,69) Gollob, Kasprzak, Hampel, B.Pedersen
  Final:
23. (64.17) Gollob (6 points), Kasprzak (4 pts), N.Pedersen (2 pts), Jonsson

== The intermediate classification ==
Qualifies for next season's Grand Prix series
Full-time Grand Prix rider
Wild card, track reserve or qualified reserve

Pos.	Rider	Points	ITA (Italy)	EUR (Poland)	SWE (Sweden)	DEN (Denmark)	GBR (United Kingdom)	CZE (Czech Republic)	SCA (Sweden)	LAT (Latvia)	POL (Poland)	SVN (Slovenia)	GER (Germany)
1	(Denmark) (3) Nicki Pedersen	164	24	23	11	16	12	24	16	19	19		
2	(Australia) (5) Leigh Adams	133	12	10	21	18	14	8	19	22	9		
3	(Australia) (1) Jason Crump	96	12	13	4	9	15	11	15	10	7		
4	(Denmark) (6) Hans N. Andersen	95	9	13	20	12	13	8	12	5	3		
5	(Poland) (8) Tomasz Gollob	91	10	3	9	11	3	1	19	14	21		
6	(United States) (2) Greg Hancock	86	19	15	9	7	17	6	5	3	5		
7	(United Kingdom) (15) Chris Harris	79	7	15	9	5	20	5	6	7	5		
8	(United Kingdom) (11) Scott Nicholls	67	4	6	4	7	9	12	8	13	4		
9	(Poland) (13) Wiesław Jaguś	66	14	6	6	3	0	9	12	11	5		
10	(Poland) (14) Rune Holta	65	2	6	9	5	5	16	5	7	10		
11	(Sweden) (4) Andreas Jonsson	64	7	5	5	16	5	7	-	8	11		
12	(Poland) (9) Jarosław Hampel	61	8	6	5	7	8	16	-	-	11		
13	(Denmark) (12) Bjarne Pedersen	57	5	8	3	5	7	6	7	8	8		
14	(Slovenia) (7) Matej Žagar	42	5	7	7	1	5	8	3	2	4		
15	(Sweden) (10) Antonio Lindbäck	30	3	0	3	9	7	0	3	0	5		
16	(Sweden) (16) Fredrik Lindgren	21	-	-	14	-	-	-	7	-	-		
17	(Poland) (16) Krzysztof Kasprzak	17	-	-	-	-	-	-	-	-	17		
18	(Denmark) (16) Kenneth Bjerre	10	-	-	-	10	-	-	-	-	-		
19	(Russia) (16) Grigory Laguta	8	-	-	-	-	-	-	-	8	-		
20	(Poland) (16) Sebastian Ułamek	6	-	6	-	-	-	-	-	-	-		
21	(Sweden) (17) Jonas Davidsson	5	-	-	5	-	-	-	ns	-	-		
22	(Sweden) (19) Peter Karlsson	5	-	-	-	-	-	-	5	-	-		
23	(Finland) (20) Kai Laukkanen	5	-	-	-	-	-	-	2	3	-		
24	(United Kingdom) (16) David Howe	4	-	-	-	-	4	-	-	-	-		
25	(Czech Republic) (16) Luboš Tomíček Jr.	4	-	-	-	-	-	4	-	-	-		
26	(Czech Republic) (17) Josef Franc	3	-	-	-	-	-	3	-	-	-		
27	(Italy) (16) Mattia Carpanese	2	2	-	-	-	-	-	-	-	-		
28	(Denmark) (18) Morten Risager	2	-	-	-	2	-	-	-	-	-		
29	(Latvia) (18) Maksims Bogdanovs	2	-	-	-	-	-	-	-	2	-		
30	(Poland) (17) Tomasz Gapiński	1	-	1	-	-	-	-	-	-	-		
31	(Latvia) (17) Kasts Poudzuks	1	-	-	-	-	-	-	-	1	-		
32	(Italy) (17) Daniele Tessari	0	0	-	-	-	-	-	-	-	-		
33	(Denmark) (17) Jesper B. Jensen	0	-	-	-	0	-	-	-	-	-		
34	(Italy) (18) Christian Miotello	0	0	-	-	-	-	-	-	-	-		
35	(Sweden) (18) Erik Andersson	0	-	-	0	-	-	-	-	-	-		
36	(Czech Republic) (18) Matěj Kůs	0	-	-	-	-	-	0	-	-	-		
	(United Kingdom) (17) Edward Kennett	-	-	-	-	-	ns	-	-	-	-		
	(Poland) (17) Krzysztof Buczkowski	-	-	-	-	-	-	-	-	-	ns		
	(Poland) (18) Tomasz Jędrzejak	-	-	ns	-	-	-	-	-	-	-		
	(United Kingdom) (18) Daniel King	-	-	-	-	-	ns	-	-	-	-		
	(Sweden) (18) Sebastian Aldén	-	-	-	-	-	-	-	ns	-	-		
	(Poland) (18) Adrian Miedziński	-	-	-	-	-	-	-	-	-	ns		
Pos.	Rider	Points	ITA (Italy)	EUR (Poland)	SWE (Sweden)	DEN (Denmark)	GBR (United Kingdom)	CZE (Czech Republic)	SCA (Sweden)	LAT (Latvia)	POL (Poland)	SVN (Slovenia)	GER (Germany)

== See also ==
- List of Speedway Grand Prix riders
