= 2007 Speedway Grand Prix of Scandinavia =

(Sweden) 2007 Speedway Grand Prix of Scandinavia
- FIM Scandinavian Speedway Grand Prix

Information
- Date: 11 August 2007
- City: (Sweden) Målilla
- Event: 7 of 11 (96)
- Referee: (Poland) Marek Wojaczek
- Jury President: (Germany) Wolfgang Glas

Stadium details
- Stadium: G&B Stadium
- Capacity: 15,000
- Length: 310 m (340 yd)
- Track: speedway track

SGP Results
- Attendance: 15,000
- Best Time: (Australia) Leigh Adams; 59.1 secs (in Heat 22)
- (gold) Winner: (Australia) Leigh Adams
- (silver) Runner-up: (Poland) Tomasz Gollob
- (bronze) 3rd place: (Australia) Jason Crump

The 2007 Speedway Grand Prix of Scandinavia was the seventh race of the 2007 Speedway Grand Prix season. It took place on 11 August in the G&B Stadium in Målilla, Sweden.

== Starting positions draw ==
The Speedway Grand Prix Commission has nominated Fredrik Lindgren (as wild card), Jonas Davidsson and Sebastian Aldén (both as track reserve). Peter Karlsson and Kai Laukkanen have replaced the injured Andreas Jonsson and Jarosław Hampel.

1. (7) Matej Žagar (Slovenia)
2. (1) Jason Crump (Australia)
3. (8) Tomasz Gollob (Poland)
4. (16) Fredrik Lindgren (Sweden)
5. (5) Leigh Adams (Australia)
6. (11) Scott Nicholls (United Kingdom)
7. (12) Bjarne Pedersen (Denmark)
8. (6) Hans N. Andersen (Denmark)
9. (10) Antonio Lindbäck (Sweden)
10. (14) Rune Holta (Poland)
11. ~~(9) Jarosław Hampel (Poland)~~ → (20) Kai Laukkanen (Finland)
12. (3) Nicki Pedersen (Denmark)
13. ~~(4) Andreas Jonsson (Sweden)~~ → (19) Peter Karlssonn (Sweden)
14. (13) Wiesław Jaguś (Poland)
15. (2) Greg Hancock (United States)
16. (15) Chris Harris (United Kingdom)
17. (17) Jonas Davidsson (Sweden)
18. (18) Sebastian Aldén (Sweden)

== Heat details ==
Placing	Draw	Rider	Total	1	2	3	4	5	6	7	8	9	10	11	12	13	14	15	16	17	18	19	20	Pts	Pos	21	22	23
1	5	(Australia) (5) Leigh Adams	19		2			3					2					2					1	10	5		3	3
2	3	(Poland) (8) Tomasz Gollob	19	3						3				2				3				2		13	2		2	2
3	2	(Australia) (1) Jason Crump	15	2					2				1				2				3			10	6	3		1
4	8	(Denmark) (6) Hans N. Andersen	12		3						1			1			3			2				10	4	2		0
5	12	(Denmark) (3) Nicki Pedersen	16			3					3		3			3						3		15	1	1
6	14	(Poland) (13) Wiesław Jaguś	12				2		3					3		1							3	12	3		0
7	6	(United Kingdom) (11) Scott Nicholls	8		1				1			1							3			1		7	8		1
8	4	(Sweden) (16) Fredrik Lindgren	7	1							0				3				1				2	7	7	Fx
9	7	(Denmark) (12) Bjarne Pedersen	7		0					1					2	2					2			7	9
10	16	(United Kingdom) (15) Chris Harris	6				0				2	3						0			1			6	10
11	10	(Poland) (14) Rune Holta	5			0			0						1			1		3				5	11
12	13	(Sweden) (19) Peter Karlsson	5				3	1							0		1					0		5	12
13	15	(United States) (2) Greg Hancock	5				1			2			0						2	0				5	13
14	9	(Sweden) (10) Antonio Lindbäck	3			1		2						0					0		0			3	14
15	1	(Slovenia) (7) Matej Žagar	3	0				0				2				0				1				3	15
16	11	(Finland) (20) Kai Laukkanen	2			2				0		Fx					E						0	2	16
17	17	(Sweden) (17) Jonas Davidsson	-																					-	17
18	18	(Sweden) (18) Sebastian Aldén	-																					-	18
Placing	Draw	Rider	Total	1	2	3	4	5	6	7	8	9	10	11	12	13	14	15	16	17	18	19	20	Pts	Pos	21	22	23

e: retired or mechanical failure • m: exclusion for exceeding two minute time allowance • t: exclusion for touching the tapes • x: other exclusion • f: fell
ns: non-starter • nc: non-classify
Semi-finals: Heat 21: Riders placed 1st, 4th, 6th & 7th in the intermediate classification (after 20 heats)
Heat 22: Riders placed 2nd, 3rd, 5th & 8th in the intermediate classification (after 20 heats)
Big Final (heat 23): The first and second placed riders in each of the Semi-Finals

gate A – inside	gate B	gate C	gate D – outside

=== Heat after heat ===
1. Gollob, Crump, Lindgren, Žagar
2. Andersen, Adams, Nicholls, B.Pedersen
3. N.Pedersen, Laukkanen, Lindbäck, Holta
4. Karlsson, Jaguś, Hancock, Harris
5. Adams, Lindbäck, Karlsson, Žagar
6. Jaguś, Crump, Nicholls, Holta
7. Gollob, Hancock, B.Pedersen, Laukkanen
8. N.Pedersen, Harris, Andersen, Lindgren
9. Harris, Žagar, Nicholls, Laukkanen (F/X)
10. N.Pedersen, Adams, Crump, Hancock
11. Jaguś, Gollob, Andersen, Lindbäck
12. Lindgren, B.Pedersen, Holta, Karlsson
13. N.Pedersen, B.Pedersen, Jaguś, Žagar
14. Andersen, Crump, Karlsson, Laukkanen (E4)
15. Gollob, Adams, Holta, Harris
16. Nicholls, Hancock, Lindgren, Lindbäck
17. Holta, Andersen, Žagar, Hancock
18. Crump, B.Pedersen, Harris, Lindbäck
19. N.Pedersen, Gollob, Nicholls, Karlsson
20. Jaguś, Lindgren, Adams, Laukkanen
  Semi-Finals:
21. Crump, Andersen, N.Pedersen, Lindgren (F/X)
22. Adams, Gollob, Nicholls, Jaguś
  Final:
23. Adams (6), Gollob (4), Crump (2), Andersen (0)

== The intermediate classification ==
Qualifies for next season's Grand Prix series
Full-time Grand Prix rider
Wild card, track reserve or qualified reserve

Pos.	Rider	Points	ITA (Italy)	EUR (Poland)	SWE (Sweden)	DEN (Denmark)	GBR (United Kingdom)	CZE (Czech Republic)	SCA (Sweden)	LAT (Latvia)	POL (Poland)	SVN (Slovenia)	GER (Germany)
1	(Denmark) (3) Nicki Pedersen	126	24	23	11	16	12	24	16				
2	(Australia) (5) Leigh Adams	102	12	10	21	18	14	8	19				
3	(Denmark) (6) Hans N. Andersen	87	9	13	20	12	13	8	12				
4	(Australia) (1) Jason Crump	79	12	13	4	9	15	11	15				
5	(United States) (2) Greg Hancock	78	19	15	9	7	17	6	5				
6	(United Kingdom) (15) Chris Harris	67	7	15	9	5	20	5	6				
7	(Poland) (8) Tomasz Gollob	56	10	3	9	11	3	1	19				
8	(Poland) (9) Jarosław Hampel	50	8	6	5	7	8	16	-				
9	(United Kingdom) (11) Scott Nicholls	50	4	6	4	7	9	12	8				
10	(Poland) (13) Wiesław Jaguś	50	14	6	6	3	0	9	12				
11	(Poland) (14) Rune Holta	48	2	6	9	5	5	16	5				
12	(Sweden) (4) Andreas Jonsson	45	7	5	5	16	5	7	-				
13	(Denmark) (12) Bjarne Pedersen	41	5	8	3	5	7	6	7				
14	(Slovenia) (7) Matej Žagar	36	5	7	7	1	5	8	3				
15	(Sweden) (10) Antonio Lindbäck	25	3	0	3	9	7	0	3				
16	(Sweden) (16) Fredrik Lindgren	21	-	-	14	-	-	-	7				
17	(Denmark) (16) Kenneth Bjerre	10	-	-	-	10	-	-	-				
18	(Poland) (16) Sebastian Ułamek	6	-	6	-	-	-	-	-				
19	(Sweden) (17) Jonas Davidsson	5	-	-	5	-	-	-	ns				
20	(Sweden) (19) Peter Karlsson	5	-	-	-	-	-	-	5				
21	(United Kingdom) (16) David Howe	4	-	-	-	-	4	-	-				
22	(Czech Republic) (16) Luboš Tomíček, Jr.	4	-	-	-	-	-	4	-				
23	(Czech Republic) (17) Josef Franc	3	-	-	-	-	-	3	-				
24	(Italy) (16) Mattia Carpanese	2	2	-	-	-	-	-	-				
25	(Denmark) (18) Morten Risager	2	-	-	-	2	-	-	-				
26	(Finland) (20) Kai Laukkanen	2	-	-	-	-	-	-	2				
27	(Poland) (17) Tomasz Gapiński	1	-	1	-	-	-	-	-				
28	(Italy) (17) Daniele Tessari	0	0	-	-	-	-	-	-				
29	(Denmark) (17) Jesper B. Jensen	0	-	-	-	0	-	-	-				
30	(Italy) (18) Christian Miotello	0	0	-	-	-	-	-	-				
31	(Sweden) (18) Erik Andersson	0	-	-	0	-	-	-	-				
32	(Czech Republic) (18) Matěj Kůs	0	-	-	-	-	-	0	-				
	(United Kingdom) (17) Edward Kennett	-	-	-	-	-	ns	-	-				
	(Poland) (18) Tomasz Jędrzejak	-	-	ns	-	-	-	-	-				
	(United Kingdom) (18) Daniel King	-	-	-	-	-	ns	-	-				
	(Sweden) (18) Sebastian Aldén	-	-	-	-	-	-	-	ns				
Pos.	Rider	Points	ITA (Italy)	EUR (Poland)	SWE (Sweden)	DEN (Denmark)	GBR (United Kingdom)	CZE (Czech Republic)	SCA (Sweden)	LAT (Latvia)	POL (Poland)	SVN (Slovenia)	GER (Germany)

== See also ==
- List of Speedway Grand Prix riders
