= 2007 Speedway Grand Prix of Latvia =

- FIM Latvijas Mobilais Telefons Speedway Grand Prix

Information
- Date: 25 August 2007
- City: (Latvia) Daugavpils
- Event: 8 /11 (97)
- Referee: (Germany) Frank Ziegler
- Jury President: (Denmark) J. L. Jensen

Stadium details
- Stadium: Latvijas Spīdveja Centrs
- Capacity: 10,500
- Length: 373 m (408 yd)
- Track: speedway track

SGP Results
- Attendance: 7,000
- Best Time: (Sweden) Andreas Jonsson, (Poland) Tomasz Gollob and (Australia) Leigh Adams; 69.0 secs (in Heat 1, 2 and 10)
- (gold) Winner: (Australia) Leigh Adams
- (silver) Runner-up: (Denmark) Nicki Pedersen
- (bronze) 3rd place: (Poland) Tomasz Gollob

The 2007 Speedway Grand Prix of Latvia was the eighth race of the 2007 Speedway Grand Prix season. It took place on 25 August in the Latvijas Spīdveja Centrs stadium in Daugavpils, Latvia.

== Starting positions draw ==
The Speedway Grand Prix Commission has nominated Grigory Laguta (as wild card), Kasts Poudzuks and Maksims Bogdanow (both as track reserve). Kai Laukkanen has replaced the injured Jarosław Hampel.

1. (4) Andreas Jonsson (Sweden)
2. (2) Greg Hancock (United States)
3. ~~(9) Jarosław Hampel (Poland)~~ → (20) Kai Laukkanen (Finland)
4. (7) Matej Žagar (Slovenia)
5. (15) Chris Harris (United Kingdom)
6. (1) Jason Crump (Australia)
7. (8) Tomasz Gollob (Poland)
8. (13) Wiesław Jaguś (Poland)
9. (11) Scott Nicholls (United Kingdom)
10. (6) Hans N. Andersen (Denmark)
11. (3) Nicki Pedersen (Denmark)
12. (5) Leigh Adams (Australia)
13. (10) Antonio Lindbäck (Sweden)
14. (16) Grigory Laguta (Russia)
15. (12) Bjarne Pedersen (Denmark)
16. (14) Rune Holta (Poland)
17. (17) Kasts Poudzuks (Latvia)
18. (18) Maksims Bogdanovs (Latvia)

Laguta was started with Latvian licence.

== Heat details ==
Placing	Draw	Rider	Total	1	2	3	4	5	6	7	8	9	10	11	12	13	14	15	16	17	18	19	20	Pts	Pos	21	22	23
1	12	(Australia) (5) Leigh Adams	22			2					2		3			3						3		13	1	3		3
2	11	(Denmark) (3) Nicki Pedersen	19			3				3		1					3						2	12	2		3	2
3	7	(Poland) (8) Tomasz Gollob	14		3					1					3	2					1			10	4	2		1
4	9	(United Kingdom) (11) Scott Nicholls	13			1		3						2					3		2			11	3		2	0
5	8	(Poland) (13) Wiesław Jaguś	11		1						3			1			2			3				10	5		1
6	6	(Australia) (1) Jason Crump	10		0				2			3							2			2		9	6	1
7	14	(Russia) (16) Grigory Laguta	8				3		1					3		0							1	8	7	0
8	1	(Sweden) (4) Andreas Jonsson	8	3				2				0				1				2				8	8		0
9	15	(Denmark) (12) Bjarne Pedersen	8				2			2			2						1	1				8	9
10	16	(Poland) (14) Rune Holta	7				1				1	2						3			0			7	10
11	5	(United Kingdom) (15) Chris Harris	7		2			1					1					F					3	7	11
12	10	(Denmark) (6) Hans N. Andersen	5			Fx			3						2			Fx		E				5	12
13	2	(United States) (2) Greg Hancock	3	E					0				0				E				3			3	13
14	3	(Finland) (20) Kai Laukkanen	3	1						0				0				2				0		3	14
15	4	(Slovenia) (7) Matej Žagar	2	2							0				0				0				0	2	15
16	18	(Latvia) (18) Maksims Bogdanovs	2												1							1		2	16
17	17	(Latvia) (17) Kasts Poudzuks	1					0									1							1	17
18	13	(Sweden) (10) Antonio Lindbäck	0				X	-							-		-					-		0	18
Placing	Draw	Rider	Total	1	2	3	4	5	6	7	8	9	10	11	12	13	14	15	16	17	18	19	20	Pts	Pos	21	22	23

e: retired or mechanical failure • m: exclusion for exceeding two minute time allowance • t: exclusion for touching the tapes • x: other exclusion • f: fell
ns: non-starter • nc: non-classify
Semi-finals: Heat 21: Riders placed 1st, 4th, 6th & 7th in the intermediate classification (after 20 heats)
Heat 22: Riders placed 2nd, 3rd, 5th & 8th in the intermediate classification (after 20 heats)
Big Final (heat 23): The first and second placed riders in each of the Semi-Finals

gate A – inside	gate B	gate C	gate D – outside

=== Heat after heat ===
1. Jonsson, Žagar, Laukkanen, Hancock (d)
2. Gollob, Jaguś, Harris, Crump
3. N. Pedersen, Adams, Nicholls, Andersen (u/w)
4. Łaguta, B. Pedersen, Holta, Lindbäck (u/w)
5. Nicholls, Jonsson, Harris, Puodżuks (za Lindbäcka)
6. Andersen, Crump, Łaguta, Hancock
7. N. Pedersen, B. Pedersen, Gollob, Laukkanen
8. Jaguś, Adams, Holta, Žagar
9. Crump, Holta, N. Pedersen, Jonsson
10. Adams, B. Pedersen, Harris, Hancock
11. Łaguta, Nicholls, Jaguś, Laukkanen
12. Gollob, Andersen, Bogdanow (za Lindbäcka), Žagar
13. Adams, Gollob, Jonsson, Łaguta
14. N. Pedersen, Jaguś, Puodżuks (za Lindbäcka), Hancock (d)
15. Holta, Laukkanen, Harris (3u), Andersen (u/w)
16. Nicholls, Crump, B. Pedersen, Žagar
17. Jaguś, Jonsson, B. Pedersen, Andersen (d)
18. Hancock, Nicholls, Gollob, Holta
19. Adams, Crump, Bogdanow (za Lindbäcka), Laukkanen
20. Harris, N. Pedersen, Łaguta, Žagar
  Semi-Finals:
21. Adams, Gollob, Crump, Łaguta
22. N. Pedersen, Nicholls, Jaguś, Jonsson
  Final:
23. Adams, N. Pedersen, Gollob, Nicholls

== The intermediate classification ==
Qualifies for next season's Grand Prix series
Full-time Grand Prix rider
Wild card, track reserve or qualified reserve

Pos.	Rider	Points	ITA (Italy)	EUR (Poland)	SWE (Sweden)	DEN (Denmark)	GBR (United Kingdom)	CZE (Czech Republic)	SCA (Sweden)	LAT (Latvia)	POL (Poland)	SVN (Slovenia)	GER (Germany)
1	(Denmark) (3) Nicki Pedersen	145	24	23	11	16	12	24	16	19			
2	(Australia) (5) Leigh Adams	124	12	10	21	18	14	8	19	22			
3	(Denmark) (6) Hans N. Andersen	92	9	13	20	12	13	8	12	5			
4	(Australia) (1) Jason Crump	89	12	13	4	9	15	11	15	10			
5	(United States) (2) Greg Hancock	81	19	15	9	7	17	6	5	3			
6	(United Kingdom) (15) Chris Harris	74	7	15	9	5	20	5	6	7			
7	(Poland) (8) Tomasz Gollob	70	10	3	9	11	3	1	19	14			
8	(United Kingdom) (11) Scott Nicholls	63	4	6	4	7	9	12	8	13			
9	(Poland) (13) Wiesław Jaguś	61	14	6	6	3	0	9	12	11			
10	(Poland) (14) Rune Holta	55	2	6	9	5	5	16	5	7			
11	(Sweden) (4) Andreas Jonsson	53	7	5	5	16	5	7	-	8			
12	(Poland) (9) Jarosław Hampel	50	8	6	5	7	8	16	-	-			
13	(Denmark) (12) Bjarne Pedersen	49	5	8	3	5	7	6	7	8			
14	(Slovenia) (7) Matej Žagar	38	5	7	7	1	5	8	3	2			
15	(Sweden) (10) Antonio Lindbäck	25	3	0	3	9	7	0	3	0			
16	(Sweden) (16) Fredrik Lindgren	21	-	-	14	-	-	-	7	-			
17	(Denmark) (16) Kenneth Bjerre	10	-	-	-	10	-	-	-	-			
18	(Russia) (16) Grigory Laguta	8	-	-	-	-	-	-	-	8			
19	(Poland) (16) Sebastian Ułamek	6	-	6	-	-	-	-	-	-			
20	(Sweden) (17) Jonas Davidsson	5	-	-	5	-	-	-	ns	-			
21	(Sweden) (19) Peter Karlsson	5	-	-	-	-	-	-	5	-			
22	(Finland) (20) Kai Laukkanen	5	-	-	-	-	-	-	2	3			
23	(United Kingdom) (16) David Howe	4	-	-	-	-	4	-	-	-			
24	(Czech Republic) (16) Luboš Tomíček, Jr.	4	-	-	-	-	-	4	-	-			
25	(Czech Republic) (17) Josef Franc	3	-	-	-	-	-	3	-	-			
26	(Italy) (16) Mattia Carpanese	2	2	-	-	-	-	-	-	-			
27	(Denmark) (18) Morten Risager	2	-	-	-	2	-	-	-	-			
28	(Latvia) (18) Maksims Bogdanovs	2	-	-	-	-	-	-	-	2			
29	(Poland) (17) Tomasz Gapiński	1	-	1	-	-	-	-	-	-			
30	(Latvia) (17) Kasts Poudzuks	1	-	-	-	-	-	-	-	1			
31	(Italy) (17) Daniele Tessari	0	0	-	-	-	-	-	-	-			
32	(Denmark) (17) Jesper B. Jensen	0	-	-	-	0	-	-	-	-			
33	(Italy) (18) Christian Miotello	0	0	-	-	-	-	-	-	-			
34	(Sweden) (18) Erik Andersson	0	-	-	0	-	-	-	-	-			
35	(Czech Republic) (18) Matěj Kůs	0	-	-	-	-	-	0	-	-			
	(United Kingdom) (17) Edward Kennett	-	-	-	-	-	ns	-	-	-			
	(Poland) (18) Tomasz Jędrzejak	-	-	ns	-	-	-	-	-	-			
	(United Kingdom) (18) Daniel King	-	-	-	-	-	ns	-	-	-			
	(Sweden) (18) Sebastian Aldén	-	-	-	-	-	-	-	ns	-			
Pos.	Rider	Points	ITA (Italy)	EUR (Poland)	SWE (Sweden)	DEN (Denmark)	GBR (United Kingdom)	CZE (Czech Republic)	SCA (Sweden)	LAT (Latvia)	POL (Poland)	SVN (Slovenia)	GER (Germany)

== See also ==
- List of Speedway Grand Prix riders
