= 2007 Speedway Grand Prix of Slovenia =

- FIM PartyPoker.net Slovenian Speedway Grand Prix

Information
- Date: 22 September 2007
- City: (Slovenia) Krško
- Event: 10 of 11 (99)
- Referee: (Poland) Wojciech Grodzki
- Jury President: (Norway) R. Otto

Stadium details
- Stadium: Matija Gubec Stadium
- Length: 387.7 m (424.0 yd)
- Track: speedway track

SGP Results
- Attendance: 8,000
- Best Time: (Australia) Leigh Adams; 65.81 secs (in Heat 6)
- (gold) Winner: (Denmark) Nicki Pedersen
- (silver) Runner-up: (United Kingdom) Scott Nicholls
- (bronze) 3rd place: (Poland) Rune Holta

The 2007 Speedway Grand Prix of Slovenia was the tenth race of the 2007 Speedway Grand Prix season. It took place on 22 September in the Matija Gubec Stadium in Krško, Slovenia.

== Starting positions draw ==
1. (1) Jason Crump (Australia)
2. (11) Scott Nicholls (United Kingdom)
3. (9) Jarosław Hampel (Poland)
4. (4) Andreas Jonsson (Sweden)
5. (15) Chris Harris (United Kingdom)
6. (16) Jurica Pavlič (Croatia)
7. (6) Hans N. Andersen (Denmark)
8. (10) Antonio Lindbäck (Sweden)
9. (12) Bjarne Pedersen (Denmark)
10. (5 Leigh Adams (Australia)
11. (8) Tomasz Gollob (Poland))
12. (2) Greg Hancock (United States)
13. (14) Rune Holta (Poland)
14. (3) Nicki Pedersen (Denmark)
15. (13) Wiesław Jaguś (Poland)
16. (7) Matej Žagar (Slovenia)
17. (17) Jernej Kolenko (Slovenia)
18. (18) Izak Šantej (Slovenia)

== Heat details ==
Placing	Draw	Rider	Total	1	2	3	4	5	6	7	8	9	10	11	12	13	14	15	16	17	18	19	20	Pts	Pos	21	22	23
1	14	(Denmark) (3) Nicki Pedersen	23				3		2					3		3							3	14	1	3		3
2	2	(United Kingdom) (11) Scott Nicholls	16	2					1				2				3				2			10	4	2		2
3	13	(Poland) (14) Rune Holta	17				2	3							3		3					2		13	2		2	1
4	1	(Australia) (1) Jason Crump	13	3				2				1				1				3				10	3		3	0
5	11	(Poland) (8) Tomasz Gollob	10			2				2		2					1						2	9	7	1
6	10	(Australia) (5) Leigh Adams	9			3			3						1			0		2				9	5		0
7	9	(Denmark) (12) Bjarne Pedersen	9			0		0						2					3		3			8	8		1
8	15	(Poland) (13) Wiesław Jaguś	9				1			3			3						1	1				9	6	0
9	5	(United Kingdom) (15) Chris Harris	8		3			1					0					3					1	8	9
10	4	(Sweden) (4) Andreas Jonsson	6	1							3				2				0				0	6	10
11	3	(Poland) (9) Jarosław Hampel	6	0						1				0				2				3		6	11
12	16	(Slovenia) (7) Matej Žagar	6				E				1	3						1			1			6	12
13	6	(Croatia) (16) Jurica Pavlič	5		2				0			0							2			1		5	13
14	12	(United States) (2) Greg Hancock	4			1					2		1			0						0		4	14
15	7	(Denmark) (6) Hans N. Andersen	3		1					0					F	2					E			3	15
16	8	(Sweden) (10) Antonio Lindbäck	1		0						0			1			0			0				1	16
17	17	(Slovenia) (17) Jernej Kolenko	-																					-	17
18	18	(Slovenia) (18) Izak Šantej	-																					-	18
Placing	Draw	Rider	Total	1	2	3	4	5	6	7	8	9	10	11	12	13	14	15	16	17	18	19	20	Pts	Pos	21	22	23

e: retired or mechanical failure • m: exclusion for exceeding two minute time allowance • t: exclusion for touching the tapes • x: other exclusion • f: fell
ns: non-starter • nc: non-classify
Semi-finals: Heat 21: Riders placed 1st, 4th, 6th & 7th in the intermediate classification (after 20 heats)
Heat 22: Riders placed 2nd, 3rd, 5th & 8th in the intermediate classification (after 20 heats)
Big Final (heat 23): The first and second placed riders in each of the Semi-Finals

gate A – inside	gate B	gate C	gate D – outside

=== Heat after heat ===
1. Crump, Nicholls, Jonsson, Hampel
2. Harris, Pavlič, Anderseon, Lindbäck
3. Adams, Gollob, Hancock, B.Pedersen
4. N.Pedersen, Holta, Jaguś, Žagar (E/start)
5. Holta, Crump, Harris, B.Pedersen
6. Adams, N.Pedersen, Nicholls, Pavlič
7. Jaguś, Gollob, Hampel, Andersen
8. Jonsson, Hancock, Žagar, Lindbäck
9. Žagar, Gollob, Crump, Pavlič
10. Jaguś, Nicholls, Hancock, Harris
11. N.Pedersen, B.Pedersen, Lindbäck, Hampel
12. Holta, Jonsson, Adams, Andersen (F)
13. N.Pedersen, Andersen, Crump, Hancock
14. Nicholls, Holta, Gollob, Lindbäck
15. Harris, Hampel, Žagar, Adams
16. B.Pedersen, Pavlič, Jaguś, Jonsson
17. Crump, Adams, Jaguś, Lindbäck
18. B.Pedersen, Nicholls, Žagar, Andersen (E4)
19. Hampel, Holta, Pavlič, Hancock
20. N.Pedersen, Gollob, Harris, Jonsson
  Semi-Finals:
21. N.Pedersen, Nicholls, Gollob, Jaguś
22. Crump, Holta, B.Pedersen, Adams
  Finał:
23. N.Pedersen (6), Nicholls (4), Holta (2) Crump (0)

== The intermediate classification ==
Qualifies for next season's Grand Prix series
Full-time Grand Prix rider
Wild card, track reserve or qualified reserve

Pos.	Rider	Points	ITA (Italy)	EUR (Poland)	SWE (Sweden)	DEN (Denmark)	GBR (United Kingdom)	CZE (Czech Republic)	SCA (Sweden)	LAT (Latvia)	POL (Poland)	SVN (Slovenia)	GER (Germany)
1	(Denmark) (3) Nicki Pedersen	187	24	23	11	16	12	24	16	19	19	23	
2	(Australia) (5) Leigh Adams	142	12	10	21	18	14	8	19	22	9	9	
3	(Australia) (1) Jason Crump	109	12	13	4	9	15	11	15	10	7	13	
4	(Poland) (8) Tomasz Gollob	101	10	3	9	11	3	1	19	14	21	10	
5	(Denmark) (6) Hans N. Andersen	98	9	13	20	12	13	8	12	5	3	3	
6	(United States) (2) Greg Hancock	90	19	15	9	7	17	6	5	3	5	4	
7	(United Kingdom) (15) Chris Harris	87	7	15	9	5	20	5	6	7	5	8	
8	(United Kingdom) (11) Scott Nicholls	83	4	6	4	7	9	12	8	13	4	16	
9	(Poland) (14) Rune Holta	81	2	6	9	5	5	16	5	7	10	16	
10	(Poland) (13) Wiesław Jaguś	75	14	6	6	3	0	9	12	11	5	9	
11	(Sweden) (4) Andreas Jonsson	70	7	5	5	16	5	7	-	8	11	6	
12	(Poland) (9) Jarosław Hampel	67	8	6	5	7	8	16	-	-	11	6	
13	(Denmark) (12) Bjarne Pedersen	66	5	8	3	5	7	6	7	8	8	9	
14	(Slovenia) (7) Matej Žagar	48	5	7	7	1	5	8	3	2	4	6	
15	(Sweden) (10) Antonio Lindbäck	31	3	0	3	9	7	0	3	0	5	1	
16	(Sweden) (16) Fredrik Lindgren	21	-	-	14	-	-	-	7	-	-	-	
17	(Poland) (16) Krzysztof Kasprzak	17	-	-	-	-	-	-	-	-	17	-	
18	(Denmark) (16) Kenneth Bjerre	10	-	-	-	10	-	-	-	-	-	-	
19	(Russia) (16) Grigory Laguta	8	-	-	-	-	-	-	-	8	-	-	
20	(Poland) (16) Sebastian Ułamek	6	-	6	-	-	-	-	-	-	-	-	
21	(Croatia) (16) Jurica Pavlič	5	-	-	-	-	-	-	-	-	-	5	
22	(Sweden) (17) Jonas Davidsson	5	-	-	5	-	-	-	ns	-	-	-	
23	(Sweden) (19) Peter Karlsson	5	-	-	-	-	-	-	5	-	-	-	
24	(Finland) (20) Kai Laukkanen	5	-	-	-	-	-	-	2	3	-	-	
25	(United Kingdom) (16) David Howe	4	-	-	-	-	4	-	-	-	-	-	
26	(Czech Republic) (16) Luboš Tomíček, Jr.	4	-	-	-	-	-	4	-	-	-	-	
27	(Czech Republic) (17) Josef Franc	3	-	-	-	-	-	3	-	-	-	-	
28	(Italy) (16) Mattia Carpanese	2	2	-	-	-	-	-	-	-	-	-	
29	(Denmark) (18) Morten Risager	2	-	-	-	2	-	-	-	-	-	-	
30	(Latvia) (18) Maksims Bogdanovs	2	-	-	-	-	-	-	-	2	-	-	
31	(Poland) (17) Tomasz Gapiński	1	-	1	-	-	-	-	-	-	-	-	
32	(Latvia) (17) Kasts Poudzuks	1	-	-	-	-	-	-	-	1	-	-	
33	(Italy) (17) Daniele Tessari	0	0	-	-	-	-	-	-	-	-	-	
34	(Denmark) (17) Jesper B. Jensen	0	-	-	-	0	-	-	-	-	-	-	
35	(Italy) (18) Christian Miotello	0	0	-	-	-	-	-	-	-	-	-	
36	(Sweden) (18) Erik Andersson	0	-	-	0	-	-	-	-	-	-	-	
37	(Czech Republic) (18) Matěj Kůs	0	-	-	-	-	-	0	-	-	-	-	
	(United Kingdom) (17) Edward Kennett	-	-	-	-	-	ns	-	-	-	-	-	
	(Poland) (17) Krzysztof Buczkowski	-	-	-	-	-	-	-	-	-	ns	-	
	(Slovenia) (17) Jernej Kolenko	-	-	-	-	-	-	-	-	-	-	ns	
	(Poland) (18) Tomasz Jędrzejak	-	-	ns	-	-	-	-	-	-	-	-	
	(United Kingdom) (18) Daniel King	-	-	-	-	-	ns	-	-	-	-	-	
	(Sweden) (18) Sebastian Aldén	-	-	-	-	-	-	-	ns	-	-	-	
	(Poland) (18) Adrian Miedziński	-	-	-	-	-	-	-	-	-	ns	-	
	(Slovenia) (18) Izak Šantej	-	-	-	-	-	-	-	-	-	-	ns	
Pos.	Rider	Points	ITA (Italy)	EUR (Poland)	SWE (Sweden)	DEN (Denmark)	GBR (United Kingdom)	CZE (Czech Republic)	SCA (Sweden)	LAT (Latvia)	POL (Poland)	SVN (Slovenia)	GER (Germany)

== See also ==
- List of Speedway Grand Prix riders
