= 2007 Speedway Grand Prix of Germany =

- FIM PartyPoker.com German Speedway Grand Prix

Information
- Date: 13 October 2007
- City: (Germany) Gelsenkirchen
- Event: 11 of 11 (100)
- Referee: (Poland) Wojciech Grodzki
- Jury President: (Finland) I. Teromaa

Stadium details
- Stadium: Veltins-Arena
- Length: 300 m (330 yd)

SGP Results
- Attendance: 26,000
- Best Time: (United States) Greg Hancock and (Sweden) Andreas Jonsson; 56.9 secs (in Heat 21 and 23)
- (gold) Winner: (Sweden) Andreas Jonsson
- (silver) Runner-up: (United States) Greg Hancock
- (bronze) 3rd place: (Australia) Jason Crump

The 2007 Speedway Grand Prix of Germany was the eleventh race of the 2007 Speedway Grand Prix season. It took place on 13 October in the Veltins-Arena stadium in Gelsenkirchen, Germany.

== Starting positions draw ==
1. (7) Matej Žagar (Slovenia)
2. (16) Christian Hefenbrock (Germany)
3. (15) Chris Harris (United Kingdom)
4. (8) Tomasz Gollob (Poland)
5. (5) Leigh Adams (Australia)
6. (6) Hans N. Andersen (Denmark)
7. (3) Nicki Pedersen (Denmark)
8. (1) Jason Crump (Australia)
9. (4) Andreas Jonsson (Sweden)
10. ~~(10) Antonio Lindbäck (Sweden)~~ → (19) Peter Karlsson (Sweden)
11. (13) Wiesław Jaguś (Poland)
12. (12) Bjarne Pedersen (Denmark)
13. ~~(9) Jarosław Hampel (Poland)~~ → (20) Kai Laukkanen (Finland)
14. (2) Greg Hancock (United States)
15. (14) Rune Holta (Poland)
16. (11) Scott Nicholls (United Kingdom)
17. (17) Martin Smolinski (Germany)
18. (18) Tobias Kroner (Germany)

== Heat details ==
Placing	Draw	Rider	Total	1	2	3	4	5	6	7	8	9	10	11	12	13	14	15	16	17	18	19	20	Pts	Pos	21	22	23
1	9	(Sweden) (4) Andreas Jonsson	20			3		1						3					3		2			12	1	2		3
2	14	(United States) (2) Greg Hancock	16				3		3					0		1							2	9	4	3		2
3	8	(Australia) (1) Jason Crump	15		2						2			1			3			3				11	2		2	1
4	5	(Australia) (5) Leigh Adams	11		0			3					1					1					3	8	8		3	0
5	12	(Denmark) (12) Bjarne Pedersen	11			0					3		2			2						3		10	3		1
6	15	(Poland) (14) Rune Holta	10				1			2			3						1	2				9	7	1
7	6	(Denmark) (6) Hans N. Andersen	9		3				2			3							0			1		9	5		X
8	7	(Denmark) (3) Nicki Pedersen	9		1					1					1	3					3			9	6	E
9	10	(Sweden) (19) Peter Karlsson	8			2			1						2			3		0				8	9
10	16	(United Kingdom) (11) Scott Nicholls	8				2				1	2						2			1			8	10
11	4	(Poland) (8) Tomasz Gollob	7	1							0				3				2				1	7	11
12	11	(Poland) (13) Wiesław Jaguś	6			1				3		0					2						0	6	12
13	1	(Slovenia) (7) Matej Žagar	6	2				2				1				0				1				6	13
14	2	(Germany) (16) Christian Hefenbrock	4	3					0				0				1				0			4	14
15	3	(United Kingdom) (15) Chris Harris	4	0						0				2				0				2		4	15
16	13	(Finland) (20) Kai Laukkanen	0				0	0							0		0					0		0	16
17	17	(Germany) (17) Martin Smolinski	-																					-	17
18	18	(Germany) (18) Tobias Kroner	-																					-	18
Placing	Draw	Rider	Total	1	2	3	4	5	6	7	8	9	10	11	12	13	14	15	16	17	18	19	20	Pts	Pos	21	22	23

e: retired or mechanical failure • m: exclusion for exceeding two minute time allowance • t: exclusion for touching the tapes • x: other exclusion • f: fell
ns: non-starter • nc: non-classify
Semi-finals: Heat 21: Riders placed 1st, 4th, 6th & 7th in the intermediate classification (after 20 heats)
Heat 22: Riders placed 2nd, 3rd, 5th & 8th in the intermediate classification (after 20 heats)
Big Final (heat 23): The first and second placed riders in each of the Semi-Finals

gate A – inside	gate B	gate C	gate D – outside

=== Heat after heat ===
1. Hefenbrock, Žagar, Gollob, Harris
2. Andersen, Crump, N.Pedersen, Adams
3. Jonsson, Karlsson, Jaguś, B.Pedersen
4. Hancock, Nicholls, Holta, Laukkanen
5. Adams, Žagar, Jonsson, Laukkanen
6. Hancock, Andersen, Karlsson, Hefenbrock
7. Jaguś, Holta, N.Pedersen, Harris
8. B.Pedersen, Crump, Nicholls, Gollob
9. Andersen, Nicholls, Žagar, Jaguś
10. Holta, B.Pedersen, Adams, Hefenbrock
11. Jonsson, Harris, Crump, Hancock
12. Gollob, Karlsson, N.Pedersen, Laukkanen
13. N.Pedersen, B.Pedersen, Hancock, Žagar
14. Crump, Jaguś, Hefenbrock, Laukkanen
15. Karlsson, Nicholls, Adams, Harris
16. Jonsson, Gollob, Holta, Andersen
17. Crump, Holta, Žagar, Karlsson
18. N.Pedersen, Jonsson, Nicholls, Hefenbrock
19. B.Pedersen, Harris, Andersen, Laukkanen
20. Adams, Hancock, Gollob, Jaguś
  Semi-Finals:
21. Hancock, Jonsson, Holta, N.Pedersen (4E)
22. Adams, Crump, B.Pedersen, Andersen (F/X)
  Final:
23. Jonsson (6 points), Hancock (4), Crump (2), Adams (0)
  Race-off (7th - 9th place in 2007 SGP):
24. Holta, Nicholls, Harris (F)

== Final standings ==
Qualifies for next season's Grand Prix series
Full-time Grand Prix rider
Wild card, track reserve or qualified reserve

Pos.	Rider	Points	ITA (Italy)	EUR (Poland)	SWE (Sweden)	DEN (Denmark)	GBR (United Kingdom)	CZE (Czech Republic)	SCA (Sweden)	LAT (Latvia)	POL (Poland)	SVN (Slovenia)	GER (Germany)
1	(Denmark) (3) Nicki Pedersen	196	24	23	11	16	12	24	16	19	19	23	9
2	(Australia) (5) Leigh Adams	153	12	10	21	18	14	8	19	22	9	9	11
3	(Australia) (1) Jason Crump	124	12	13	4	9	15	11	15	10	7	13	15
4	(Poland) (8) Tomasz Gollob	108	10	3	9	11	3	1	19	14	21	10	7
5	(Denmark) (6) Hans N. Andersen	107	9	13	20	12	13	8	12	5	3	3	9
6	(United States) (2) Greg Hancock	106	19	15	9	7	17	6	5	3	5	4	16
7	(Poland) (14) Rune Holta	91 +3	2	6	9	5	5	16	5	7	10	16	10
8	(United Kingdom) (11) Scott Nicholls	91 +2	4	6	4	7	9	12	8	13	4	16	8
9	(United Kingdom) (15) Chris Harris	91 +F	7	15	9	5	20	5	6	7	5	8	4
10	(Sweden) (4) Andreas Jonsson	90	7	5	5	16	5	7	-	8	11	6	20
11	(Poland) (13) Wiesław Jaguś	81	14	6	6	3	0	9	12	11	5	9	6
12	(Denmark) (12) Bjarne Pedersen	77	5	8	3	5	7	6	7	8	8	9	11
13	(Poland) (9) Jarosław Hampel	67	8	6	5	7	8	16	-	-	11	6	-
14	(Slovenia) (7) Matej Žagar	54	5	7	7	1	5	8	3	2	4	6	6
15	(Sweden) (10) Antonio Lindbäck	31	3	0	3	9	7	0	3	0	5	1	-
16	(Sweden) (16) Fredrik Lindgren	21	-	-	14	-	-	-	7	-	-	-	-
17	(Poland) (16) Krzysztof Kasprzak	17	-	-	-	-	-	-	-	-	17	-	-
18	(Sweden) (19) Peter Karlsson	13	-	-	-	-	-	-	5	-	-	-	8
19	(Denmark) (16) Kenneth Bjerre	10	-	-	-	10	-	-	-	-	-	-	-
20	(Russia) (16) Grigory Laguta	8	-	-	-	-	-	-	-	8	-	-	-
21	(Poland) (16) Sebastian Ułamek	6	-	6	-	-	-	-	-	-	-	-	-
22	(Croatia) (16) Jurica Pavlič	5	-	-	-	-	-	-	-	-	-	5	-
23	(Sweden) (17) Jonas Davidsson	5	-	-	5	-	-	-	ns	-	-	-	-
24	(Finland) (20) Kai Laukkanen	5	-	-	-	-	-	-	2	3	-	-	0
25	(United Kingdom) (16) David Howe	4	-	-	-	-	4	-	-	-	-	-	-
26	(Czech Republic) (16) Luboš Tomíček, Jr.	4	-	-	-	-	-	4	-	-	-	-	-
27	(Germany) (16) Christian Hefenbrock	4	-	-	-	-	-	-	-	-	-	-	4
28	(Czech Republic) (17) Josef Franc	3	-	-	-	-	-	3	-	-	-	-	-
29	(Italy) (16) Mattia Carpanese	2	2	-	-	-	-	-	-	-	-	-	-
30	(Denmark) (18) Morten Risager	2	-	-	-	2	-	-	-	-	-	-	-
31	(Latvia) (18) Maksims Bogdanovs	2	-	-	-	-	-	-	-	2	-	-	-
32	(Poland) (17) Tomasz Gapiński	1	-	1	-	-	-	-	-	-	-	-	-
33	(Latvia) (17) Kasts Poudzuks	1	-	-	-	-	-	-	1	-	-	-	
34	(Italy) (17) Daniele Tessari	0	0	-	-	-	-	-	-	-	-	-	-
35	(Denmark) (17) Jesper B. Jensen	0	-	-	-	0	-	-	-	-	-	-	-
36	(Italy) (18) Christian Miotello	0	0	-	-	-	-	-	-	-	-	-	-
37	(Sweden) (18) Erik Andersson	0	-	-	0	-	-	-	-	-	-	-	-
38	(Czech Republic) (18) Matěj Kůs	0	-	-	-	-	-	0	-	-	-	-	-
	(United Kingdom) (17) Edward Kennett	-	-	-	-	-	ns	-	-	-	-	-	-
	(Poland) (17) Krzysztof Buczkowski	-	-	-	-	-	-	-	-	-	ns	-	-
	(Slovenia) (17) Jernej Kolenko	-	-	-	-	-	-	-	-	-	-	ns	-
	(Germany) (17) Martin Smolinski	-	-	-	-	-	-	-	-	-	-	-	ns
	(Poland) (18) Tomasz Jędrzejak	-	-	ns	-	-	-	-	-	-	-	-	-
	(United Kingdom) (18) Daniel King	-	-	-	-	-	ns	-	-	-	-	-	-
	(Sweden) (18) Sebastian Aldén	-	-	-	-	-	-	-	ns	-	-	-	-
	(Poland) (18) Adrian Miedziński	-	-	-	-	-	-	-	-	-	ns	-	-
	(Slovenia) (18) Izak Šantej	-	-	-	-	-	-	-	-	-	-	ns	-
	(Germany) (18) Tobias Kroner	-	-	-	-	-	-	-	-	-	-	-	ns
Pos.	Rider	Points	ITA (Italy)	EUR (Poland)	SWE (Sweden)	DEN (Denmark)	GBR (United Kingdom)	CZE (Czech Republic)	SCA (Sweden)	LAT (Latvia)	POL (Poland)	SVN (Slovenia)	GER (Germany)
