= 2007 Speedway Grand Prix of Czech Republic =

- FIM PartyPoker.net Czech Republic Speedway Grand Prix

Information
- Date: 28 July 2007
- City: (Czech Republic) Prague
- Event: 6 of 11 (95)
- Referee: (Poland) Wojciech Grodzki
- Jury President: (Denmark) J. L. Jensen

Stadium details
- Stadium: Markéta Stadium
- Track: speedway track

SGP Results
- Attendance: 9,800
- Best Time: (Denmark) Nicki Pedersen; 63.82 secs (in Heat 2)
- (gold) Winner: (Denmark) Nicki Pedersen
- (silver) Runner-up: (Poland) Jarosław Hampel
- (bronze) 3rd place: (Poland) Rune Holta

The 2007 Speedway Grand Prix of Czech Republic was the sixth race of the 2007 Speedway Grand Prix season. It took place on 28 July in the Marketa Stadium in Prague, Czech Republic.

== Starting positions draw ==
1. (12) Bjarne Pedersen (Denmark)
2. (16) Luboš Tomíček, Jr. (Czech Republic)
3. (9) Jarosław Hampel (Poland)
4. (10) Antonio Lindbäck (Sweden)
5. (15) Chris Harris (United Kingdom)
6. (2) Greg Hancock (United States)
7. (3) Nicki Pedersen (Denmark)
8. (13) Wiesław Jaguś (Poland)
9. (11) Scott Nicholls (United Kingdom)
10. (7) Matej Žagar (Slovenia)
11. (14) Rune Holta (Poland)
12. (5) Leigh Adams (Australia)
13. (1) Jason Crump (Australia)
14. (8) Tomasz Gollob (Poland)
15. (4) Andreas Jonsson (Sweden)
16. (6) Hans N. Andersen (Denmark)
17. (17) Josef Franc (Czech Republic)
18. (18) Matěj Kůs (Czech Republic)

== Heat details ==
Placing	Draw	Rider	Total	1	2	3	4	5	6	7	8	9	10	11	12	13	14	15	16	17	18	19	20	Pts	Pos	21	22	23
1	7	(Denmark) (3) Nicki Pedersen	24		3					3					3	3					3			15	1	3		3
2	3	(Poland) (9) Jarosław Hampel	16	1						0				3				3				3		10	3		2	2
3	11	(Poland) (14) Rune Holta	16			1				2		3					2						3	11	2		3	1
4	9	(United Kingdom) (11) Scott Nicholls	12			0		3						2					3		2			10	4	2		0
5	13	(Australia) (1) Jason Crump	11				1	2							2		3					2		10	5		1
6	8	(Poland) (13) Wiesław Jaguś	9		1						3			1			0			3				8	6	1
7	10	(Slovenia) (7) Matej Žagar	8			3			3						1			0		1				8	7	0
8	12	(Australia) (5) Leigh Adams	8			2					2		2			2						0		8	8		0
9	16	(Denmark) (6) Hans N. Andersen	8				2				1	2						2			1			8	9
10	15	(Sweden) (4) Andreas Jonsson	7				3			1			3						Fx	-				7	10
11	1	(Denmark) (12) Bjarne Pedersen	6	3				1				0				0				2				6	11
12	6	(United States) (2) Greg Hancock	6		0				2			1							2			1		6	12
13	5	(United Kingdom) (15) Chris Harris	5		2			0					1					1					1	5	13
14	2	(Czech Republic) (16) Luboš Tomíček, Jr.	4	2					1				0				1				0			4	14
15	17	(Czech Republic) (17) Josef Franc	3																1				2	3	15
16	14	(Poland) (8) Tomasz Gollob	1				0		0					0		1							0	1	16
17	4	(Sweden) (10) Antonio Lindbäck	0	0							0				0				-				-	0	17
18	18	(Czech Republic) (18) Matěj Kůs	0																	0				0	18
Placing	Draw	Rider	Total	1	2	3	4	5	6	7	8	9	10	11	12	13	14	15	16	17	18	19	20	Pts	Pos	21	22	23

e: retired or mechanical failure • m: exclusion for exceeding two minute time allowance • t: exclusion for touching the tapes • x: other exclusion • f: fell
ns: non-starter • nc: non-classify
Semi-finals: Heat 21: Riders placed 1st, 4th, 6th & 7th in the intermediate classification (after 20 heats)
Heat 22: Riders placed 2nd, 3rd, 5th & 8th in the intermediate classification (after 20 heats)
Big Final (heat 23): The first and second placed riders in each of the Semi-Finals

gate A – inside	gate B	gate C	gate D – outside

=== Heat after heat ===
1. B.Pedersen, Tomíček, Hampel, Lindbäck
2. N.Pedersen, Harris, Jaguś, Hancock
3. Žagar, Adams, Holta, Nicholls
4. Jonsson, Andersen, Crump, Gollob
5. Nicholls, Crump, B.Pedersen, Harris
6. Žagar, Hancock, Tomíček, Gollob
7. N.Pedersen, Holta, Jonsson, Hampel
8. Jaguś, Adams, Andersen, Lindbäck
9. Holta, Andersen, Hancock, B.Pedersen
10. Jonsson, Adams, Harris, Tomíček
11. Hampel, Nicholls, Jaguś, Gollob (e)
12. N.Pedersen, Crump, Žagar, Lindbäck (e)
13. N.Pedersen, Adams, Gollob, B.Pedersen
14. Crump, Holta, Tomíček, Jaguś
15. Hampel, Andersen, Harris, Žagar
16. Nicholls, Hancock, Franc, Jonsson (Fx)
17. Jaguś, B.Pedersen, Žagar, Kůs
18. N.Pedersen, Nicholls, Andersen, Tomíček
19. Hampel, Crump, Hancock, Adams
20. Holta, Franc, Harris, Gollob
  Semi-Finals:
21. N.Pedersen, Nicholls, Jaguś, Žagar
22. Holta, Hampel, Crump, Adams
  The Final:
23. N.Pedersen (6 points), Hampel (4 pts), Holta (2 pts), Nicholls

== The intermediate classification ==
Qualifies for next season's Grand Prix series
Full-time Grand Prix rider
Wild card, track reserve or qualified reserve

Pos.	Rider	Points	ITA (Italy)	EUR (Poland)	SWE (Sweden)	DEN (Denmark)	GBR (United Kingdom)	CZE (Czech Republic)	SCA (Sweden)	LAT (Latvia)	POL (Poland)	SVN (Slovenia)	GER (Germany)
1	(Denmark) (3) Nicki Pedersen	110	24	23	11	16	12	24					
2	(Australia) (5) Leigh Adams	83	12	10	21	18	14	8					
3	(Denmark) (6) Hans N. Andersen	75	9	13	20	12	13	8					
4	(United States) (2) Greg Hancock	73	19	15	9	7	17	6					
5	(Australia) (1) Jason Crump	64	12	13	4	9	15	11					
6	(United Kingdom) (15) Chris Harris	61	7	15	9	5	20	5					
7	(Poland) (9) Jarosław Hampel	50	8	6	5	7	8	16					
8	(Sweden) (4) Andreas Jonsson	45	7	5	5	16	5	7					
9	(Poland) (14) Rune Holta	43	2	6	9	5	5	16					
10	(United Kingdom) (11) Scott Nicholls	42	4	6	4	7	9	12					
11	(Poland) (13) Wiesław Jaguś	38	14	6	6	3	0	9					
12	(Poland) (8) Tomasz Gollob	37	10	3	9	11	3	1					
13	(Denmark) (12) Bjarne Pedersen	34	5	8	3	5	7	6					
14	(Slovenia) (7) Matej Žagar	33	5	7	7	1	5	8					
15	(Sweden) (10) Antonio Lindbäck	22	3	0	3	9	7	0					
16	(Sweden) (16) Fredrik Lindgren	14	-	-	14	-	-	-					
17	(Denmark) (16) Kenneth Bjerre	10	-	-	-	10	-	-					
18	(Poland) (16) Sebastian Ułamek	6	-	6	-	-	-	-					
19	(Sweden) (17) Jonas Davidsson	5	-	-	5	-	-	-					
20	(United Kingdom) (16) David Howe	4	-	-	-	-	4	-					
21	(Czech Republic) (16) Luboš Tomíček, Jr.	4	-	-	-	-	-	4					
22	(Czech Republic) (17) Josef Franc	3	-	-	-	-	-	3					
23	(Italy) (16) Mattia Carpanese	2	2	-	-	-	-	-					
24	(Denmark) (18) Morten Risager	2	-	-	-	2	-	-					
25	(Poland) (17) Tomasz Gapiński	1	-	1	-	-	-	-					
26	(Italy) (17) Daniele Tessari	0	0	-	-	-	-	-					
27	(Denmark) (17) Jesper B. Jensen	0	-	-	-	0	-	-					
28	(Italy) (18) Christian Miotello	0	0	-	-	-	-	-					
29	(Sweden) (18) Erik Andersson	0	-	-	0	-	-	-					
30	(Czech Republic) (18) Matěj Kůs	0	-	-	-	-	-	0					
	(United Kingdom) (17) Edward Kennett	-	-	-	-	-	ns	-					
	(Poland) (18) Tomasz Jędrzejak	-	-	ns	-	-	-	-					
	(United Kingdom) (18) Daniel King	-	-	-	-	-	ns	-					
Pos.	Rider	Points	ITA (Italy)	EUR (Poland)	SWE (Sweden)	DEN (Denmark)	GBR (United Kingdom)	CZE (Czech Republic)	SCA (Sweden)	LAT (Latvia)	POL (Poland)	SVN (Slovenia)	GER (Germany)

== See also ==
- List of Speedway Grand Prix riders
