= 2007 Speedway Grand Prix of Great Britain =

Speedway race in Cardiff, Wales

(United Kingdom) 2007 Speedway Grand Prix of Great Britain
- FIM Meridian Lifts British Speedway Grand Prix

Information
- Date: 30 June 2007
- City: (United Kingdom) Cardiff
- Event: 5 of 11 (94)
- Referee: (Sweden) Krister Gardell

Stadium details
- Stadium: Millennium Stadium
- Capacity: 62,500
- Length: 3,877 m (4,240 yd)

SGP Results
- Attendance: 41,247
- Best Time: (United Kingdom) Chris Harris; 56.6 secs (in Heat 3)
- (gold) Winner: (United Kingdom) Chris Harris
- (silver) Runner-up: (United States) Greg Hancock
- (bronze) 3rd place: (Australia) Jason Crump

The 2007 Speedway Grand Prix of Great Britain, known as the 2007 FIM Meridian Lifts British Speedway Grand Prix for sponsorship reasons, was the fifth race of the 2007 Speedway Grand Prix season. It took place on 30 June in the Millennium Stadium in Cardiff, United Kingdom.

== Starting positions draw ==
The Speedway Grand Prix Commission nominated David Howe (as Wild Card), Edward Kennett and Daniel King (both as Track Reserve). This was undertaken at the suggestion of the British event organisers who requested that finishing positions from the 2007 British Championship determine the identity of the wild card and reserves - the highest placed rider in that event (other than the pre-qualified Chris Harris and Scott Nicholls) would be the wild card, the next two would be the track reserves. David Howe finished second to Harris and took the wild card place.

1. (4) Andreas Jonsson (Sweden)
2. (6) Hans N. Andersen (Denmark)
3. (16) David Howe (UK)
4. (11) Scott Nicholls (UK)
5. (13) Wiesław Jaguś (Poland)
6. (8) Tomasz Gollob (Poland)
7. (14) Rune Holta (Poland)
8. (7) Matej Žagar (Slovenia)
9. (3) Nicki Pedersen (Denmark)
10. (1) Jason Crump (Australia)
11. (9) Jarosław Hampel (Poland)
12. (15) Chris Harris (UK)
13. (10) Antonio Lindbäck (Sweden)
14. (5) Leigh Adams (Australia)
15. (12) Bjarne Pedersen (Denmark)
16. (2) Greg Hancock (USA)
17. (17) Edward Kennett (UK)
18. (18) Daniel King (UK)

== Heat details ==
Placing	Draw	Rider	Total	1	2	3	4	5	6	7	8	9	10	11	12	13	14	15	16	17	18	19	20	Pts	Pos	21	22	23
1	12	(United Kingdom) (15) Chris Harris	20			3					2		2			2						3		12	2		2	3
2	16	(United States) (2) Greg Hancock	17				0				3	2						3			3			11	4	2		2
3	10	(Australia) (1) Jason Crump	15			1			1						3			2		3				10	6	3		1
4	14	(Australia) (5) Leigh Adams	14				1		2					3		3							2	11	5		3	0
5	2	(Denmark) (6) Hans N. Andersen	13	3					3				3				2				1			12	1	1
6	9	(Denmark) (3) Nicki Pedersen	12			2		3						2					3		2			12	3		X
7	4	(United Kingdom) (11) Scott Nicholls	9	1							1				2				2				3	9	7	0
8	11	(Poland) (9) Jarosław Hampel	8			0				0		3					3						1	7	8		1
9	13	(Sweden) (10) Antonio Lindbäck	7				3	2							1		1					0		7	9
10	15	(Denmark) (12) Bjarne Pedersen	7				2			3			1						1	0				7	10
11	7	(Poland) (14) Rune Holta	5		3					1					E	1					0			5	11
12	8	(Slovenia) (7) Matej Žagar	5		2						0			1			0			2				5	12
13	1	(Sweden) (4) Andreas Jonsson	5	2				1				1				X				1				5	13
14	3	(United Kingdom) (16) David Howe	4	0						2				0				1				1		4	14
15	6	(Poland) (8) Tomasz Gollob	3		1				0			0							0			2		3	15
16	5	(Poland) (13) Wiesław Jaguś	0		0			0					0					0					0	0	16
17	17	(United Kingdom) (17) Edward Kennett	-																					-	17
18	18	(United Kingdom) (18) Daniel King	-																					-	18
Placing	Draw	Rider	Total	1	2	3	4	5	6	7	8	9	10	11	12	13	14	15	16	17	18	19	20	Pts	Pos	21	22	23

e: retired or mechanical failure • m: exclusion for exceeding two minute time allowance • t: exclusion for touching the tapes • x: other exclusion • f: fell
ns: non-starter • nc: non-classify
Semi-finals: Heat 21: Riders placed 1st, 4th, 6th & 7th in the intermediate classification (after 20 heats)
Heat 22: Riders placed 2nd, 3rd, 5th & 8th in the intermediate classification (after 20 heats)
Big Final (heat 23): The first and second placed riders in each of the Semi-Finals

gate A – inside	gate B	gate C	gate D – outside

== The intermediate classification ==
Qualifies for next season's Grand Prix series
Full-time Grand Prix rider
Wild card, track reserve or qualified reserve

Pos.	Rider	Points	ITA (Italy)	EUR (Poland)	SWE (Sweden)	DEN (Denmark)	GBR (United Kingdom)	CZE (Czech Republic)	SCA (Sweden)	LAT (Latvia)	POL (Poland)	SVN (Slovenia)	GER (Germany)
1	(Denmark) (3) Nicki Pedersen	86	24	23	11	16	12						
2	(Australia) (5) Leigh Adams	75	12	10	21	18	14						
3	(Denmark) (6) Hans N. Andersen	67	9	13	20	12	13						
4	(United States) (2) Greg Hancock	67	19	15	9	7	17						
5	(United Kingdom) (15) Chris Harris	56	7	15	9	5	20						
6	(Australia) (1) Jason Crump	53	12	13	4	9	15						
7	(Sweden) (4) Andreas Jonsson	38	7	5	5	16	5						
8	(Poland) (8) Tomasz Gollob	36	10	3	9	11	3						
9	(Poland) (9) Jarosław Hampel	34	8	6	5	7	8						
10	(United Kingdom) (11) Scott Nicholls	30	4	6	4	7	9						
11	(Poland) (13) Wiesław Jaguś	29	14	6	6	3	0						
12	(Denmark) (12) Bjarne Pedersen	28	5	8	3	5	7						
13	(Poland) (14) Rune Holta	27	2	6	9	5	5						
14	(Slovenia) (7) Matej Žagar	25	5	7	7	1	5						
15	(Sweden) (10) Antonio Lindbäck	22	3	0	3	9	7						
16	(Sweden) (16) Fredrik Lindgren	14	-	-	14	-	-						
17	(Denmark) (16) Kenneth Bjerre	10	-	-	-	10	-						
18	(Poland) (16) Sebastian Ułamek	6	-	6	-	-	-						
19	(Sweden) (17) Jonas Davidsson	5	-	-	5	-	-						
20	(United Kingdom) (16) David Howe	4	-	-	-	-	4						
21	(Italy) (16) Mattia Carpanese	2	2	-	-	-	-						
22	(Denmark) (18) Morten Risager	2	-	-	-	2	-						
23	(Poland) (17) Tomasz Gapiński	1	-	1	-	-	-						
24	(Italy) (17) Daniele Tessari	0	0	-	-	-	-						
25	(Denmark) (17) Jesper B. Jensen	0	-	-	-	0	-						
26	(Italy) (18) Christian Miotello	0	0	-	-	-	-						
27	(Sweden) (18) Erik Andersson	0	-	-	0	-	-						
	(United Kingdom) (17) Edward Kennett	-	-	-	-	-	ns						
	(Poland) (18) Tomasz Jędrzejak	-	-	ns	-	-	-						
	(United Kingdom) (18) Daniel King	-	-	-	-	-	ns						
Pos.	Rider	Points	ITA (Italy)	EUR (Poland)	SWE (Sweden)	DEN (Denmark)	GBR (United Kingdom)	CZE (Czech Republic)	SCA (Sweden)	LAT (Latvia)	POL (Poland)	SVN (Slovenia)	GER (Germany)

== See also ==
- List of Speedway Grand Prix riders
