= 2007 Speedway Grand Prix of Sweden =

- FIM PartyPoker.net Swedish Speedway Grand Prix

Information
- Date: 26 May 2007
- City: (Sweden) Eskilstuna
- Event: 3 of 11 (92)
- Referee: (Poland) Wojciech Grodzki
- Jury President: (Germany) Wolfgang Glas

Stadium details
- Stadium: Smedstadium
- Length: 335 m (366 yd)
- Track: speedway track

SGP Results
- Attendance: 8,000
- Best Time: (Denmark) Nicki Pedersen; 59.8 secs (in Heat 5)
- (gold) Winner: (Australia) Leigh Adams
- (silver) Runner-up: (Denmark) Hans N. Andersen
- (bronze) 3rd place: (Sweden) Fredrik Lindgren

The 2007 Speedway Grand Prix of Sweden was the third race of the 2007 Speedway Grand Prix season. It took place on 26 May in the Smedstadium stadium in Eskilstuna, Sweden.

== Starting positions draw ==
The Speedway Grand Prix Commission has nominated Fredrik Lindgren (as Wild Card), Jonas Davidsson and Eric Andersson (both as Track Reserve).

1. (14) Rune Holta (Poland)
2. (9) Jarosław Hampel (Poland)
3. (4) Andreas Jonsson (Sweden)
4. (12) Bjarne Pedersen (Denmark)
5. (6) Hans N. Andersen (Denmark)
6. (13) Wiesław Jaguś (Poland)
7. (11) Scott Nicholls (United Kingdom)
8. (15) Chris Harris (United Kingdom)
9. (3) Nicki Pedersen (Denmark)
10. (2) Greg Hancock (United States)
11. (1) Jason Crump (Australia)
12. (8) Tomasz Gollob (Poland)
13. (10) Antonio Lindbäck (Sweden)
14. (16) Fredrik Lindgren (Sweden)
15. (5) Leigh Adams (Australia)
16. (7) Matej Žagar (Slovenia)
17. (17) Jonas Davidsson (Sweden)
18. (18) Erik Andersson (Sweden)

Wiesław Jaguś and Eric Andersson in 2007 season was a Smederna Eskilstuna's rider.

== Heat details ==
Placing	Draw	Rider	Total	1	2	3	4	5	6	7	8	9	10	11	12	13	14	15	16	17	18	19	20	Pts	Pos	21	22	23
1	15	(Australia) (5) Leigh Adams	21				3			3			2						3	1				12	2		3	3
2	5	(Denmark) (6) Hans N. Andersen	20		3			2					3					3					2	13	1	3		2
3	14	(Sweden) (16) Fredrik Lindgren	14				2		2					2		3							1	10	3		2	1
4	9	(Denmark) (3) Nicki Pedersen	11			0		3						3					X		3			9	4	2		0
5	10	(United States) (2) Greg Hancock	9			3			1						3			2		0				9	5		0
6	1	(Poland) (14) Rune Holta	9	3				1				1				1				3				9	6	0
7	12	(Poland) (8) Tomasz Gollob	9			1					1		1			2						3		8	7	1
8	8	(United Kingdom) (15) Chris Harris	9		1						2			1			2			2				8	8		1
9	16	(Slovenia) (7) Matej Žagar	7				1				3	2						1			0			7	9
10	6	(Poland) (13) Wiesław Jaguś	6		0				3			3							F/-			-		6	10
11	17	(Sweden) (17) Jonas Davidsson	5																2				3	5	11
12	2	(Poland) (9) Jarosław Hampel	5	1					0				0				3				1			5	12
13	3	(Sweden) (4) Andreas Jonsson	5	2						1				0				0				2		5	13
14	7	(United Kingdom) (11) Scott Nicholls	4		2					0					0	0					2			4	14
15	11	(Australia) (1) Jason Crump	4			2				2		0					F						-	4	15
16	4	(Denmark) (12) Bjarne Pedersen	3	0							0				2				1				0	3	16
17	13	(Sweden) (10) Antonio Lindbäck	2				0	0							1		0					1		2	17
18	18	(Sweden) (18) Erik Andersson	0																			0		0	18
Placing	Draw	Rider	Total	1	2	3	4	5	6	7	8	9	10	11	12	13	14	15	16	17	18	19	20	Pts	Pos	21	22	23

e: retired or mechanical failure • m: exclusion for exceeding two minute time allowance • t: exclusion for touching the tapes • x: other exclusion • f: fell
ns: non-starter • nc: non-classify
Semi-finals: Heat 21: Riders placed 1st, 4th, 6th & 7th in the intermediate classification (after 20 heats)
Heat 22: Riders placed 2nd, 3rd, 5th & 8th in the intermediate classification (after 20 heats)
Big Final (heat 23): The first and second placed riders in each of the Semi-Finals

gate A – inside	gate B	gate C	gate D – outside

=== Heat after heat ===
1. Holta, Jonsson, Hampel, B.Pedersen
2. Andersen, Nicholls, Harris, Jaguś
3. Hancock, Crump, Gollob, N.Pedersen
4. Adams, Lindgren, Žagar, Lindbäck
5. N.Pedersen, Andersen, Holta, Lindbäck
6. Jaguś, Lindgren, Hancock, Hampel
7. Adams, Crump, Jonsson, Nicholls
8. Žagar, Harris, Gollob, B.Pedersen
9. Jaguś, Žagar, Holta, Crump
10. Andersen, Adams, Gollob, Hampel
11. N.Pedersen, Lindgren, Harris, Jonsson
12. Hancock, B.Pedersen, Lindbäck, Nicholls
13. Lindgren, Gollob, Holta, Nicholls
14. Hampel, Harris, Lindbäck, Crump (f)
15. Andersen, Hancock, Žagar, Jonsson
16. Adams, Davidsson (for Jaguś), B.Pedersen, N.Pedersen (x/f — in repeated heat); ~~Jaguś~~ (f/x)
17. Holta, Harris, Adams, Hancock
18. N.Pedersen, Nicholls, Hampel, Žagar
19. Gollob, Jonsson, Lindbäck, Andersson (for Jaguś)
20. Davidsson (for Crump), Andersen, Lindgren, B.Pedersen
  Semi-finals:
21. Andersen, N.Pedersen, Gollob, Holta
22. Adams, Lindgren, Harris, Hancock
  Great Final:
23. Adams (6), Andersen (4), Lindgren (2), N.Pedersen (0)

== The intermediate classification ==
Qualifies for next season's Grand Prix series
Full-time Grand Prix rider
Wild card, track reserve or qualified reserve

Pos.	Rider	Points	ITA (Italy)	EUR (Poland)	SWE (Sweden)	DEN (Denmark)	GBR (United Kingdom)	CZE (Czech Republic)	SCA (Sweden)	LAT (Latvia)	POL (Poland)	SVN (Slovenia)	GER (Germany)
1	(Denmark) (3) Nicki Pedersen	58	24	23	11								
2	(United States) (2) Greg Hancock	43	19	15	9								
3	(Australia) (5) Leigh Adams	43	12	10	21								
4	(Denmark) (6) Hans N. Andersen	42	9	13	20								
5	(United Kingdom) (15) Chris Harris	31	7	15	9								
6	(Australia) (1) Jason Crump	29	12	13	4								
7	(Poland) (13) Wiesław Jaguś	26	14	6	6								
8	(Poland) (8) Tomasz Gollob	22	10	3	9								
9	(Slovenia) (7) Matej Žagar	19	5	7	7								
10	(Poland) (9) Jarosław Hampel	19	8	6	5								
11	(Sweden) (4) Andreas Jonsson	17	7	5	5								
12	(Poland) (14) Rune Holta	17	2	6	9								
13	(Denmark) (12) Bjarne Pedersen	16	5	8	3								
14	(United Kingdom) (11) Scott Nicholls	14	4	6	4								
15	(Sweden) (16) Fredrik Lindgren	14	-	-	14								
16	(Sweden) (10) Antonio Lindbäck	6	3	0	3								
17	(Poland) (16) Sebastian Ułamek	6	-	6	-								
18	(Sweden) (17) Jonas Davidsson	5	-	-	5								
19	(Italy) (16) Mattia Carpanese	2	2	-	-								
20	(Poland) (17) Tomasz Gapiński	1	-	1	-								
21	(Italy) (17) Daniele Tessari	0	0	-	-								
22	(Italy) (18) Christian Miotello	0	0	-	-								
23	(Sweden) (18) Erik Andersson	0	-	-	0								
	(Poland) (18) Tomasz Jędrzejak	-	-	ns	-								
Pos.	Rider	Points	ITA (Italy)	EUR (Poland)	SWE (Sweden)	DEN (Denmark)	GBR (United Kingdom)	CZE (Czech Republic)	SCA (Sweden)	LAT (Latvia)	POL (Poland)	SVN (Slovenia)	GER (Germany)

== See also ==
- List of Speedway Grand Prix riders
