= 2007 Speedway Grand Prix of Denmark =

- FIM Dansk Metal Danish Speedway Grand Prix

Information
- Date: 9 June 2007
- City: (Denmark) Copenhagen
- Event: 4 of 11 (93)
- Referee: (Poland) Marek Wojaczek
- Jury President: (Norway) Roy Otto

Stadium details
- Stadium: Parken Stadium
- Capacity: 32,500
- Length: 275 m (301 yd)

SGP Results
- Attendance: 32,000
- Best Time: (Australia) Jason Crump, (Denmark) Hans N. Andersen and (United States) Greg Hancock; 55.5 secs (in Heat 4, 5 and 8)
- (gold) Winner: (Sweden) Andreas Jonsson
- (silver) Runner-up: (Denmark) Nicki Pedersen
- (bronze) 3rd place: (Australia) Leigh Adams

The 2007 Speedway Grand Prix of Denmark was the fourth race of the 2007 Speedway Grand Prix season. It took place on 9 June in the Parken Stadium in Copenhagen, Denmark.

== Starting positions draw ==
The Speedway Grand Prix Commission has nominated Kenneth Bjerre (as Wild Card), Jesper B. Jensen and Morten Risager (both as Track Reserve).

1. (15) Chris Harris (United Kingdom)
2. (10) Antonio Lindbäck (Sweden)
3. (13) Wiesław Jaguś (Poland)
4. (14) Rune Holta (Poland)
5. (9) Jarosław Hampel (Poland)
6. (3) Nicki Pedersen (Denmark)
7. (2) Greg Hancock (United States)
8. (8) Tomasz Gollob (Poland)
9. (6) Hans N. Andersen (Denmark)
10. (7) Matej Žagar (Slovenia)
11. (12) Bjarne Pedersen (Denmark)
12. (5) Leigh Adams (Australia)
13. (11) Scott Nicholls (United Kingdom)
14. (1) Jason Crump (Australia)
15. (4) Andreas Jonsson (Sweden)
16. (16) Kenneth Bjerre (Denmark)
17. (17) Jesper B. Jensen (Denmark)
18. (18) Morten Risager (Denmark)

== Heat details ==
Placing	Draw	Rider	Total	1	2	3	4	5	6	7	8	9	10	11	12	13	14	15	16	17	18	19	20	Pts	Pos	21	22	23
1	15	(Sweden) (4) Andreas Jonsson	16				0			2			1						3	2				8	8		2	3
2	6	(Denmark) (3) Nicki Pedersen	16		T				3			3							1			2		9	5		3	2
3	12	(Australia) (5) Leigh Adams	18			2					3		3			2						3		13	1	3		1
4	8	(Poland) (8) Tomasz Gollob	11		1						0			3			2			3				9	4	2		0
5	9	(Denmark) (6) Hans N. Andersen	12			3		3						1					2		3			12	2		E
6	16	(Denmark) (16) Kenneth Bjerre	10				1				1	2						3			2			9	7	1
7	2	(Sweden) (8) Antonio Lindbäck	9	3					2				0				3				1			9	3		X
8	14	(Australia) (1) Jason Crump	9				3		1					2		1							2	9	6	0
9	7	(United States) (2) Greg Hancock	7		3					X					1	3					0			7	9
10	5	(Poland) (9) Jarosław Hampel	7		2			0					2					0					3	7	10
11	13	(United Kingdom) (11) Scott Nicholls	7				2	1							2		1					1		7	11
12	4	(Poland) (14) Rune Holta	5	0							2				3				F				0	5	12
13	11	(Denmark) (12) Bjarne Pedersen	5			X				3		1					0						1	5	13
14	1	(United Kingdom) (15) Chris Harris	5	2				2				E				0				1				5	14
15	3	(Poland) (13) Wiesław Jaguś	3	1						1				0				1				0		3	15
16	18	(Denmark) (18) Morten Risager	2						0									2						2	16
17	10	(Slovenia) (7) Matej Žagar	1			1			-						-			-		-				1	17
18	17	(Denmark) (17) Jesper B. Jensen	0		0										0					0				0	18
Placing	Draw	Rider	Total	1	2	3	4	5	6	7	8	9	10	11	12	13	14	15	16	17	18	19	20	Pts	Pos	21	22	23

e: retired or mechanical failure • m: exclusion for exceeding two minute time allowance • t: exclusion for touching the tapes • x: other exclusion • f: fell
ns: non-starter • nc: non-classify
Semi-finals: Heat 21: Riders placed 1st, 4th, 6th & 7th in the intermediate classification (after 20 heats)
Heat 22: Riders placed 2nd, 3rd, 5th & 8th in the intermediate classification (after 20 heats)
Big Final (heat 23): The first and second placed riders in each of the Semi-Finals

gate A – inside	gate B	gate C	gate D – outside

=== Heat after heat ===
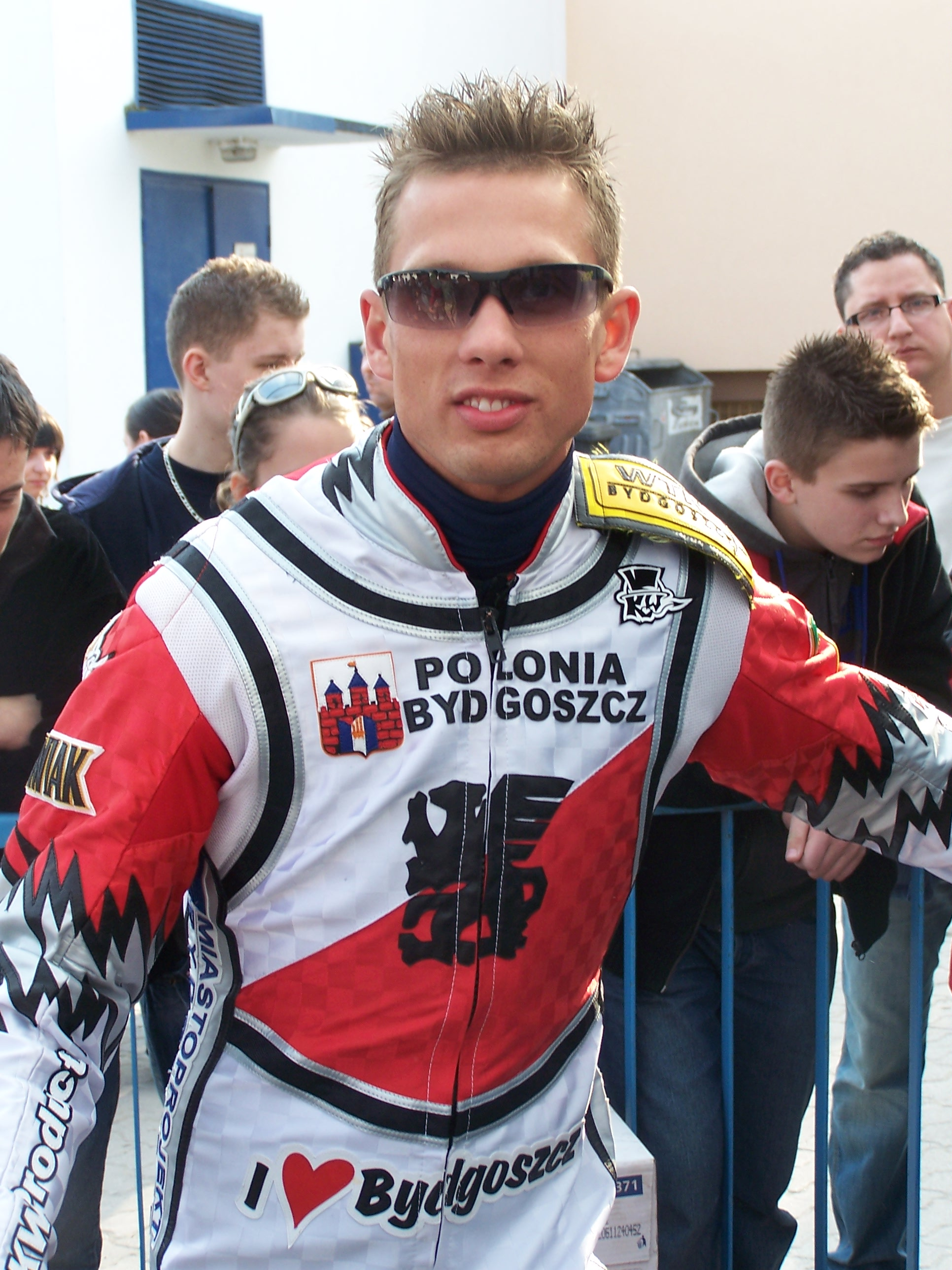
Andreas Jonsson – 2007 Danish SGP winner.

1. Lindbäck, Harris, Jaguś, Holta
2. Hancock, Hampel, Gollob, Jensen (for N.Pedersen); ~~N.Pedersen~~ (t)
3. Andersen, Adams, Žagar, B.Pedersen (f/x)
4. Crump, Nicholls, Bjerre, Jonsson
5. Andersen, Harris, Nicholls, Hampel
6. N.Pedersen, Lindbäck, Crump, Risager (for Žagar)
7. B.Pedersen, Jonsson, Jaguś, Hancock (f/x)
8. Adams, Holta, Bjerre, Gollob
9. N.Pedersen, Bjerre, B.Pedersen, Harris (e)
10. Adams, Hampel, Jonsson, Lindbäck
11. Gollob, Crump, Andersen, Jaguś
12. Holta, Nicholls, Hancock, Jensen (for Žagar)
13. Hancock, Adams, Crump, Harris
14. Lindbäck, Gollob, Nicholls, B.Pedersen
15. Bjerre, Risager (for Žagar), Jaguś, Hampel
16. Jonsson, Andersen, N.Pedersen, Holta (f3)
17. Gollob, Jonsson, Harris, Jensen (for Žagar)
18. Andersen, Bjerre, Lindbäck, Hancock
19. Adams, N.Pedersen, Nicholls, Jaguś
20. Hampel, Crump, B.Pedersen, Holta
  Semi-finals:
21. Adams, Gollob, Bjerre, Crump
22. N.Pedersen, Jonsson, Andersen (e3), Lindbäck (f/x)
  Great Final:
23. Jonsson (6), N.Pedersen (4), Adams (2), Gollob (0)

== The intermediate classification ==
Qualifies for next season's Grand Prix series
Full-time Grand Prix rider
Wild card, track reserve or qualified reserve

Pos.	Rider	Points	ITA (Italy)	EUR (Poland)	SWE (Sweden)	DEN (Denmark)	GBR (United Kingdom)	CZE (Czech Republic)	SCA (Sweden)	LAT (Latvia)	POL (Poland)	SVN (Slovenia)	GER (Germany)
1	(Denmark) (3) Nicki Pedersen	74	24	23	11	16							
2	(Australia) (5) Leigh Adams	61	12	10	21	18							
3	(Denmark) (6) Hans N. Andersen	54	9	13	20	12							
4	(United States) (2) Greg Hancock	50	19	15	9	7							
5	(Australia) (1) Jason Crump	38	12	13	4	9							
6	(United Kingdom) (15) Chris Harris	36	7	15	9	5							
7	(Sweden) (4) Andreas Jonsson	33	7	5	5	16							
8	(Poland) (8) Tomasz Gollob	33	10	3	9	11							
9	(Poland) (13) Wiesław Jaguś	29	14	6	6	3							
10	(Poland) (9) Jarosław Hampel	26	8	6	5	7							
11	(Poland) (14) Rune Holta	22	2	6	9	5							
12	(United Kingdom) (11) Scott Nicholls	21	4	6	4	7							
13	(Denmark) (12) Bjarne Pedersen	21	5	8	3	5							
14	(Slovenia) (7) Matej Žagar	20	5	7	7	1							
15	(Sweden) (10) Antonio Lindbäck	15	3	0	3	9							
16	(Sweden) (16) Fredrik Lindgren	14	-	-	14	-							
17	(Denmark) (16) Kenneth Bjerre	10	-	-	-	10							
18	(Poland) (16) Sebastian Ułamek	6	-	6	-	-							
19	(Sweden) (17) Jonas Davidsson	5	-	-	5	-							
20	(Italy) (16) Mattia Carpanese	2	2	-	-	-							
21	(Denmark) (18) Morten Risager	2	-	-	-	2							
22	(Poland) (17) Tomasz Gapiński	1	-	1	-	-							
23	(Italy) (17) Daniele Tessari	0	0	-	-	-							
24	(Denmark) (17) Jesper B. Jensen	0	-	-	-	0							
25	(Italy) (18) Christian Miotello	0	0	-	-	-							
26	(Sweden) (18) Erik Andersson	0	-	-	0	-							
	(Poland) (18) Tomasz Jędrzejak	-	-	ns	-	-							
Pos.	Rider	Points	ITA (Italy)	EUR (Poland)	SWE (Sweden)	DEN (Denmark)	GBR (United Kingdom)	CZE (Czech Republic)	SCA (Sweden)	LAT (Latvia)	POL (Poland)	SVN (Slovenia)	GER (Germany)

== See also ==
- List of Speedway Grand Prix riders
