= 2007 Speedway Grand Prix of Europe =

(Poland) 2007 Speedway Grand Prix of Europe
- FIM Wrocław European Speedway Grand Prix

Information
- Date: 12 May 2007
- City: (Poland) Wrocław
- Event: 2 /11 (91)
- Referee: (Sweden) Krister Gardell
- Jury President: (Denmark) Jørgen L. Jensen

Stadium details
- Stadium: Olympic Stadium
- Length: 387 m (423 yd)
- Track: speedway track

SGP Results
- Attendance: 20,000
- Best Time: (Australia) Leigh Adams; 64.25 secs (in Heat 6)
- (gold) Winner: (Denmark) Nicki Pedersen
- (silver) Runner-up: (Denmark) Hans N. Andersen
- (bronze) 3rd place: (United Kingdom) Chris Harris

The 2007 Speedway Grand Prix of Europe was the second race of the 2007 Speedway Grand Prix season. It took place on 12 May in the Olympic Stadium in Wrocław, Poland.

== Starting positions draw ==
The Speedway Grand Prix Commission has nominated Sebastian Ułamek (as Wild Card), Tomasz Gapiński and Tomasz Jędrzejak (both as Track Reserve).

1. (15) Chris Harris (United Kingdom)
2. (2) Greg Hancock (United States)
3. (3) Nicki Pedersen (Denmark)
4. (16) Sebastian Ułamek (Poland)
5. (5) Leigh Adams (Australia)
6. (14) Rune Holta (Poland)
7. (9) Jarosław Hampel (Poland)
8. (6) Hans N. Andersen (Denmark)
9. (10) Antonio Lindbäck (Sweden)
10. (13) Wiesław Jaguś (Poland)
11. (8) Tomasz Gollob (Poland)
12. (12) Bjarne Pedersen (Denmark)
13. (1) Jason Crump (Australia)
14. (11) Scott Nicholls (United Kingdom)
15. (7) Matej Žagar (Slovenia)
16. (4) Andreas Jonsson (Sweden)
17. (17) Tomasz Gapiński (Poland)
18. (18) Tomasz Jędrzejak (Poland)

Jason Crump, Hans N. Andersen, Tomasz Gapiński and Tomasz Jędrzejak in 2007 season are Atlas Wrocław's rider.

== Heat details ==
Placing	Draw	Rider	Total	1	2	3	4	5	6	7	8	9	10	11	12	13	14	15	16	17	18	19	20	Pts	Pos	21	22	23
1	3	(Denmark) (3) Nicki Pedersen	23	3						2				3				3				3		14	1	3		3
2	8	(Denmark) (6) Hans N. Andersen	13		0						3			1			0			2				6	8		3	2
3	1	(United Kingdom) (15) Chris Harris	15	1				1				3				3				3				11	3		2	1
4	13	(Australia) (1) Jason Crump	13				3	2							2		2					2		11	4	2		0
5	2	(United States) (2) Greg Hancock	15	2					3				3				3				3			14	2		1
6	5	(Australia) (5) Leigh Adams	10		2			3					2					x					3	10	5		0
7	12	(Denmark) (12) Bjarne Pedersen	8			3					1		0			2						1		7	7	1
8	15	(Slovenia) (7) Matej Žagar	7				0			3			1						2	1				7	6	0
9	4	(Poland) (16) Sebastian Ułamek	6	0							0				3				1				2	6	9
10	7	(Poland) (9) Jarosław Hampel	6		3					f					1	f					2			6	10
11	6	(Poland) (14) Rune Holta	6		1				f			2							3			x		6	11
12	10	(Poland) (13) Wiesław Jaguś	6			2			2						0			2		0				6	12
13	14	(United Kingdom) (11) Scott Nicholls	6				1		1					2		1							1	6	13
14	16	(Sweden) (4) Andreas Jonsson	4				2				1	1						x			-			4	14
15	11	(Poland) (8) Tomasz Gollob	3			1				1		e					1						0	3	15
16	17	(Poland) (17) Tomasz Gapiński	1																		1			1	16
17	9	(Sweden) (10) Antonio Lindbäck	0			0		0						0					0		0			0	17
18	18	(Poland) (18) Tomasz Jędrzejak	-																					-	18
Placing	Draw	Rider	Total	1	2	3	4	5	6	7	8	9	10	11	12	13	14	15	16	17	18	19	20	Pts	Pos	21	22	23

e: retired or mechanical failure • m: exclusion for exceeding two minute time allowance • t: exclusion for touching the tapes • x: other exclusion • f: fell
ns: non-starter • nc: non-classify
Semi-finals: Heat 21: Riders placed 1st, 4th, 6th & 7th in the intermediate classification (after 20 heats)
Heat 22: Riders placed 2nd, 3rd, 5th & 8th in the intermediate classification (after 20 heats)
Big Final (heat 23): The first and second placed riders in each of the Semi-Finals

gate A – inside	gate B	gate C	gate D – outside

=== Heat after heat ===
1. N.Pedersen, Hancock, Harris, Ułamek
2. Hampel, Adams, Holta, Andersen
3. B.Pedersen, Jaguś, Gollob, Lindbäck
4. Crump, Jonsson, Nicholls, Žagar
5. Adams, Crump, Harris, Lindbäck
6. Hancock, Jaguś, Nicholls, Holta (f)
7. Žagar, N.Pedersen, Gollob, Hampel (f)
8. Andersen, Jonsson, B.Pedersen, Ułamek
9. Harris, Holta, Jonsson, Gollob (e)
10. Hancock, Adams, Žagar, B.Pedersen
11. N.Pedersen, Nicholls, Andersen, Lindbäck
12. Ułamek, Crump, Hampel, Jaguś
13. Harris, B.Pedersen, Nicholls, Hampel (f)
14. Hancock, Crump, Gollob, Andersen
15. N.Pedersen, Jaguś, Jonsson (f/x), Adams (f/x)
16. Holta, Žagar, Ułamek, Lindbäck
17. Harris, Andersen, Žagar, Jaguś
18. Hancock, Hampel, Gapiński, Lindbäck (Gapiński replaced Jonsson who was not able to start)
19. N.Pedersen, Crump, B.Pedersen, Holta (f/x)
20. Adams, Ułamek, Nicholls, Gollob
  Semi-Finals:
21. N.Pedersen, Crump, B.Pedersen, Žagar
22. Andersen, Harris, Hancock, Adams
  Great Final:
23. N.Pedersen (6 points), Andersen (4 pts), Harris (2 pts), Crump

== The intermediate classification ==
Qualifies for next season's Grand Prix series
Full-time Grand Prix rider
Wild card, track reserve or qualified reserve

Pos.	Rider	Points	ITA (Italy)	EUR (Poland)	SWE (Sweden)	DEN (Denmark)	GBR (United Kingdom)	CZE (Czech Republic)	SCA (Sweden)	LAT (Latvia)	POL (Poland)	SVN (Slovenia)	GER (Germany)
1	(Denmark) (3) Nicki Pedersen	47	24	23									
2	(United States) (2) Greg Hancock	34	19	15									
3	(Australia) (1) Jason Crump	25	12	13									
4	(Australia) (5) Leigh Adams	22	12	10									
5	(Denmark) (6) Hans N. Andersen	22	9	13									
6	(United Kingdom) (15) Chris Harris	22	7	15									
7	(Poland) (13) Wiesław Jaguś	20	14	6									
8	(Poland) (9) Jarosław Hampel	14	8	6									
9	(Poland) (8) Tomasz Gollob	13	10	3									
10	(Denmark) (12) Bjarne Pedersen	13	5	8									
11	(Sweden) (4) Andreas Jonsson	12	7	5									
12	(Slovenia) (7) Matej Žagar	12	5	7									
13	(United Kingdom) (11) Scott Nicholls	10	4	6									
14	(Poland) (14) Rune Holta	8	2	6									
15	(Poland) (16) Sebastian Ułamek	6	-	6									
16	(Sweden) (10) Antonio Lindbäck	3	3	0									
17	(Italy) (16) Mattia Carpanese	2	2	-									
18	(Poland) (17) Tomasz Gapiński	1	-	1									
19	(Italy) (17) Daniele Tessari	0	0	-									
20	(Italy) (18) Christian Miotello	0	0	-									
	(Poland) (18) Tomasz Jędrzejak	-	-	ns									
Pos.	Rider	Points	ITA (Italy)	EUR (Poland)	SWE (Sweden)	DEN (Denmark)	GBR (United Kingdom)	CZE (Czech Republic)	SCA (Sweden)	LAT (Latvia)	POL (Poland)	SVN (Slovenia)	GER (Germany)

== See also ==
- List of Speedway Grand Prix riders
