= 2007 Speedway Grand Prix of Italy =

- FIM Meridian Lifts Italian Speedway Grand Prix

Information
- Date: 28 April 2007
- City: (Italy) Lonigo
- Event: 1 of 11 (90)
- Referee: (Germany) Frank Ziegler
- Jury President: (Norway) Roy Otto

Stadium details
- Stadium: Stadio Speedway Santa Marina
- Capacity: 8,000
- Track: speedway track

SGP Results
- Attendance: 6,000
- Best Time: (Poland) Jarosław Hampel; 66.09 secs (in Heat 1)
- (gold) Winner: (Denmark) Nicki Pedersen
- (silver) Runner-up: (United States) Greg Hancock
- (bronze) 3rd place: (Poland) Wieslaw Jagus

The 2007 Italian Speedway Grand Prix was the first event in the 2007 Speedway Grand Prix season. It was held on 28 April 2007 in the Stadio Speedway Santa Marina in Lonigo, Italy.

== Starting positions draw ==
The Speedway Grand Prix Commission nominated Mattia Carpanese as Wild Card, and Daniele Tessari and Christian Miotello both as Track Reserve.

1. (6) Hans N. Andersen (Denmark)
2. (9) Jarosław Hampel (Poland)
3. (8) Tomasz Gollob (Poland)
4. (14) Rune Holta (Poland)
5. (12) Bjarne Pedersen (Denmark)
6. (1) Jason Crump (Australia)
7. (7) Matej Žagar (Slovenia)
8. (4) Andreas Jonsson (Sweden)
9. (16) Mattia Carpanese (Italy)
10. (2) Greg Hancock (United States)
11. (15) Chris Harris (United Kingdom)
12. (10) Antonio Lindbäck (Sweden)
13. (3) Nicki Pedersen (Denmark)
14. (5) Leigh Adams (Australia)
15. (11) Scott Nicholls (United Kingdom)
16. (13) Wiesław Jaguś (Poland)
17. (17) Daniele Tessari (Italy)
18. (18) Christian Miotello (Italy)

== Heat details ==
Placing	Draw	Rider	Total	1	2	3	4	5	6	7	8	9	10	11	12	13	14	15	16	17	18	19	20	Pts	Pos	21	22	23
1	13	(Denmark) (3) Nicki Pedersen	24				3	3							3		3					3		15	1	3		3
2	10	(United States) (2) Greg Hancock	19			3			3						2			2		2				12	2		3	2
3	16	(Poland) (13) Wiesław Jaguś	14				0				3	3						3			1			10	4	2		1
4	6	(Australia) (1) Jason Crump	12		3				1			2							3			1		10	5		2	0
5	14	(Australia) (5) Leigh Adams	12				2		2					1		3							3	11	3		1
6	3	(Poland) (8) Tomasz Gollob	10	1						3				3				0				2		9	6	1
7	1	(Denmark) (6) Hans N. Andersen	9	2				1				1				2				3				9	7	0
8	2	(Poland) (9) Jarosław Hampel	8	3					0				1				2				2			8	8		0
9	11	(United Kingdom) (15) Chris Harris	7			2				2		0					1						2	7	9
10	8	(Sweden) (4) Andreas Jonsson	7		2						2			2			0			1				7	10
11	7	(Slovenia) (7) Matej Žagar	5		1					0					1	0					3			5	11
12	5	(Denmark) (12) Bjarne Pedersen	5		T/-			e					3					1					1	5	12
13	15	(United Kingdom) (11) Scott Nicholls	4				1			1			2						x	0				4	13
14	12	(Sweden) (10) Antonio Lindbäck	3			1					1		0			1						0		3	14
15	4	(Poland) (14) Rune Holta	2	x							0				x				2				0	2	15
16	9	(Italy) (16) Mattia Carpanese	2			0		2						M/-					f		0			2	16
17	17	(Italy) (17) Daniele Tessari	0		0																			0	17
18	18	(Italy) (18) Christian Miotello	0											0										0	18
Placing	Draw	Rider	Total	1	2	3	4	5	6	7	8	9	10	11	12	13	14	15	16	17	18	19	20	Pts	Pos	21	22	23

e: retired or mechanical failure • m: exclusion for exceeding two minute time allowance • t: exclusion for touching the tapes • x: other exclusion • f: fell
ns: non-starter • nc: non-classify
Semi-finals: Heat 21: Riders placed 1st, 4th, 6th & 7th in the intermediate classification (after 20 heats)
Heat 22: Riders placed 2nd, 3rd, 5th & 8th in the intermediate classification (after 20 heats)
Big Final (heat 23): The first and second placed riders in each of the Semi-Finals

gate A – inside	gate B	gate C	gate D – outside

=== Heat Results ===
1. Hampel, Andersen, Gollob, Holta (x)
2. Crump, Jonsson, Žagar, Tessari; B.Pedersen (t)
3. Hancock, Harris, Lindbäck, Carpanese
4. N.Pedersen, Adams, Nicholls, Jaguś
5. N.Pedersen, Carpanese, Andersen, B.Pedersen
6. Hancock, Adams, Crump, Hampel
7. Gollob, Harris, Nicholls, Žagar
8. Jaguś, Jonsson, Lindbäck, Holta
9. Jaguś, Crump, Andersen, Harris
10. B.Pedersen, Nicholls, Hampel, Lindbäck
11. Gollob, Jonsson, Adams, Miotello; Carpanese (m)
12. N.Pedersen, Hancock, Žagar, Holta (x)
13. Adams, Andersen, Lindbäck, Žagar
14. N.Pedersen, Hampel, Harris, Jonsson
15. Jaguś, Hancock, B.Pedersen, Gollob
16. Crump, Holta, Nicholls (x), Carpanese (f)
17. Andersen, Hancock, Jonsson, Nicholls
18. Žagar, Hampel, Jaguś, Carpanese
19. N.Pedersen, Gollob, Crump, Lindbäck
20. Adams, Harris, B.Pedersen, Holta
  Semi-finals:
21. N.Pedersen, Jaguś, Gollob, Andersen
22. Hancock, Crump, Adams, Hampel
  Great Final:
23. N.Pedersen, Hancock, Jaguś, Crump

== The intermediate classification ==
Qualifies for next season's Grand Prix series
Full-time Grand Prix rider
Wild card, track reserve or qualified reserve

Pos.	Rider	Points	ITA (Italy)	EUR (Poland)	SWE (Sweden)	DEN (Denmark)	GBR (United Kingdom)	CZE (Czech Republic)	SCA (Sweden)	LAT (Latvia)	POL (Poland)	SVN (Slovenia)	GER (Germany)
1	(Denmark) (3) Nicki Pedersen	24	24										
2	(United States) (2) Greg Hancock	19	19										
3	(Poland) (13) Wiesław Jaguś	14	14										
4	(Australia) (1) Jason Crump	12	12										
5	(Australia) (5) Leigh Adams	12	12										
6	(Poland) (8) Tomasz Gollob	10	10										
7	(Denmark) (6) Hans N. Andersen	9	9										
8	(Poland) (9) Jarosław Hampel	8	8										
9	(Sweden) (4) Andreas Jonsson	7	7										
10	(United Kingdom) (15) Chris Harris	7	7										
11	(Slovenia) (7) Matej Žagar	5	5										
12	(Denmark) (12) Bjarne Pedersen	5	5										
13	(United Kingdom) (11) Scott Nicholls	4	4										
14	(Sweden) (10) Antonio Lindbäck	3	3										
15	(Poland) (14) Rune Holta	2	2										
16	(Italy) (16) Mattia Carpanese	2	2										
17	(Italy) (17) Daniele Tessari	0	0										
18	(Italy) (18) Christian Miotello	0	0										
Pos.	Rider	Points	ITA (Italy)	EUR (Poland)	SWE (Sweden)	DEN (Denmark)	GBR (United Kingdom)	CZE (Czech Republic)	SCA (Sweden)	LAT (Latvia)	POL (Poland)	SVN (Slovenia)	GER (Germany)

== See also ==
- List of Speedway Grand Prix riders
