= Andreas Jonsson =

Swedish speedway rider

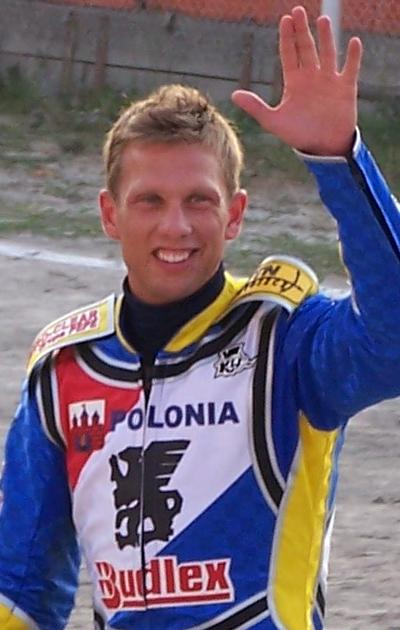
- Andreas Jonsson in July 2006
- Born: 3 September 1980 (age 46); Häverödal, Sweden
- Nationality: Swedish

Career history

Sweden
- 1996–2004, 2014–2019: Rospiggarna
- 2005–2012: Dackarna
- 2013: Smederna

Great Britain
- 1998–1999, 2001–2005: Coventry
- 2006–2008, 2015–2016: Lakeside Hammers

Poland
- 1999–2000: Gorzów
- 2001: Toruń
- 2002–2003, 2017: Częstochowa
- 2004–2010: Bydgoszcz
- 2011–2015: Zielona Góra
- 2016: Rybnik
- 2018–2019: Motor Lublin

Denmark
- 2010–2011: Esbjerg

Speedway Grand Prix statistics
- Starts: 158
- Podiums: 18 (9-6-3)
- Finalist: 25 times
- Winner: 9 times

Individual honours
- 2011: World Championship runner-up
- 2006, 2007, 2009, 2010, 2011, 2013, 2016: Swedish Champion
- 2000: World Under-21 Champion
- 1998, 2000: Swedish U21 champion
- 1997, 1998, 1999: Scandinavian Under-21 Champion
- 2006: Scandinavian Grand Prix Winner
- 2007: Danish Grand Prix Winner
- 2007: German Grand Prix Winner
- 2009 2014: Nordic Grand Prix Winner
- 2010: Polish Grand Prix Champion
- 2011: Torun Grand Prix Champion
- 2011: Croatian Grand Prix Champion
- 2011: Italian Grand Prix Champion
- 2007: Golden Helmet of Pardubice (CZE)

Team honours
- 2003, 2004, 2015: World Cup Winner
- 1999, 2001: Swedish Pairs Winner
- 2003, 2001: Polish Ekstraliga Champion
- 1997, 2001, 2002, 2007, 2016: Swedish Elitserien Champion
- 2005: European Club Champion

Andreas Karl Rune Jonsson (born 3 September 1980 in Stockholm, Sweden) is a Swedish former international motorcycle speedway rider. He was a member of the Sweden speedway team that won the World Cup in 2003, 2004 and 2015. He earned 26 caps for the Sweden national speedway team.

== Career summary ==
Jonsson excelled at Under-21 level winning two Swedish U21 Championships in 1998 and 2000, three Scandinavian titles and the 2000 Speedway Under-21 World Championship. He began his career in his native Sweden riding for Rospiggarna in 1996 nut would be a regular rider in the British and Polish leagues. He started in Britain in 1998 for the Coventry Bees and one year later in 1999 in Poland for Stal Gorzów Wielkopolski.

Jonsson soon became one of the sports leading riders and first participated in the Speedway Grand Prix (the World Championship) in 2001. He would remain a Grand Prix rider for 16 consecutive years until the end of the 2016 season.

Jonsson won the $100,000 first prize on offer at the 100th Speedway Grand Prix, billed as the 'Richest Minute in Motorsport' and won eight Grand Prix events in total. His greatest achievement came in 2011, when he was the World Championship runner-up behind Greg Hancock.

In addition to nearly becoming the World individual champion, Jonsson did win three World team Championships (Speedway World Cup) with Sweden in 2003, 2004 and 2015. He medalled another ten times.

Jonsson has also won the Swedish Championship on seven occasions in 2006, 2007, 2009,
2010, 2011, 2013 and 2016.

In late-August 2019, Jonsson announced his retirement from motorcycle speedway.

== Speedway Grand Prix results ==
Year	Position	Points	Best Finish	Notes
2001	24th	7	11th	One ride as a wild card in Sweden
2002	14th	70	4th	
2003	10th	76	4th	
2004	7th	97	2nd	
2005	8th	80	2nd	
2006	4th	119	Winner	Won home event in Malilla (Sweden)
2007	10th	90	Winner	Won events in Copenhagen (Denmark) and Gelsenkirchen (Germany)
2008	7th	100	4th	
2009	5th	116	Winner	Won event in Vojens (Denmark)
2010	9th	95	Winner	Won event in Bydgoszcz (Poland)
2011	2nd	125	Winner	Won events in Terenzano (Italy), Torun (Poland) and Gorican (Croatia)
2012	9th	88	2nd	
2013	13th	64	7th	
2014	6th	103	Winner	Won event in Vojens (Denmark)
2015	10th	88	3rd	
2016	14th	53	8th	
2018	=19th	7	=9th	1 event only

2007 Speedway Grand Prix Final Championship standings (Riding No 4)
Race no.	Grand Prix	Pos.	Pts.	Heats	Draw No
1 /11	(Italy) Italian SGP	10	7	(2,2,2,0,1)	8
2 /11	(Europe) European SGP	14	4	(2,1,1,X,-)	16
3 /11	(Sweden) Swedish SGP	12	5	(2,1,0,0,2)	3
4 /11	(Denmark) Danish SGP	1	16	(0,2,1,3,2) +2 +3	15
5 /11	(United Kingdom) British SGP	13	5	(2,1,1,X,1)	1
6 /11	(Czech Republic) Czech Rep. SGP	10	7	(3,1,3,X,-)	15
7 /11	(Kalmar Union) Scandinavian SGP	injury → (19) Peter Karlsson			13
8 /11	(Latvia) Latvian SGP	8	8	(3,2,0,1,2) +0	1
9 /11	(Poland) Polish SGP	4	11	(1,3,0,3,2) +2 +0	9
10 /11	(Slovenia) Slovenian SGP	10	6	(1,3,2,0,0)	4
11 /11	(Germany) German SGP	1	21	(3,1,3,3,3) +2 +3	9

permanent speedway rider
wild card, track reserve or qualified reserve
rider not classified (track reserve who did not start)

== See also ==
- Sweden national speedway team
- List of Speedway Grand Prix riders
- Speedway in Sweden
