= 2007 Speedway Grand Prix =

62nd edition of the official World Championship of Speedway

Season details
- Dates: 28 April - 13 October
- Events: 11
- Cities: 11
- Countries: 9
- Riders: 15 permanents 1 wild card(s); 2 track reserves
- Heats: 253 + 1 Run-off (in 11 events)

Winners
- Champion: DEN Nicki Pedersen
- Runner-up: AUS Leigh Adams
- 3rd place: AUS Jason Crump

The 2007 Speedway Grand Prix was the 62nd edition of the official World Championship and the 13th season in the Speedway Grand Prix era used to determine the Speedway World Champion. It was the first under the promotion of IMG, who had purchased series organisers Benfield Sports International (BSI).

== Event format ==
The format for 2007 was a revision of that used in 2006, with 16 riders taking part in each Grand Prix and over the course of 20 heats each rider racing against every other rider once. The top 8 scorers advanced to a semi-final and from each semi-final the 1st and 2nd placed riders advanced to the Grand Prix final.

All rides counted towards Grand Prix points totals, including the semi-final and final, which counted as double (6-4-2-0) and therefore the maximum points for a single Grand Prix was 24 (5x heat wins, semi final win and final win). This scoring revision was introduced as a result of comments made during 2006 that the four finalists received too many points compared to the losing semi-finalists who received little benefit compared to the 9th placed non-qualifier. This format also meant that the winner of each Grand Prix may not be the rider who scores most Grand Prix points from each race.

== Cities ==
Cities of 2007 Grand Prix:

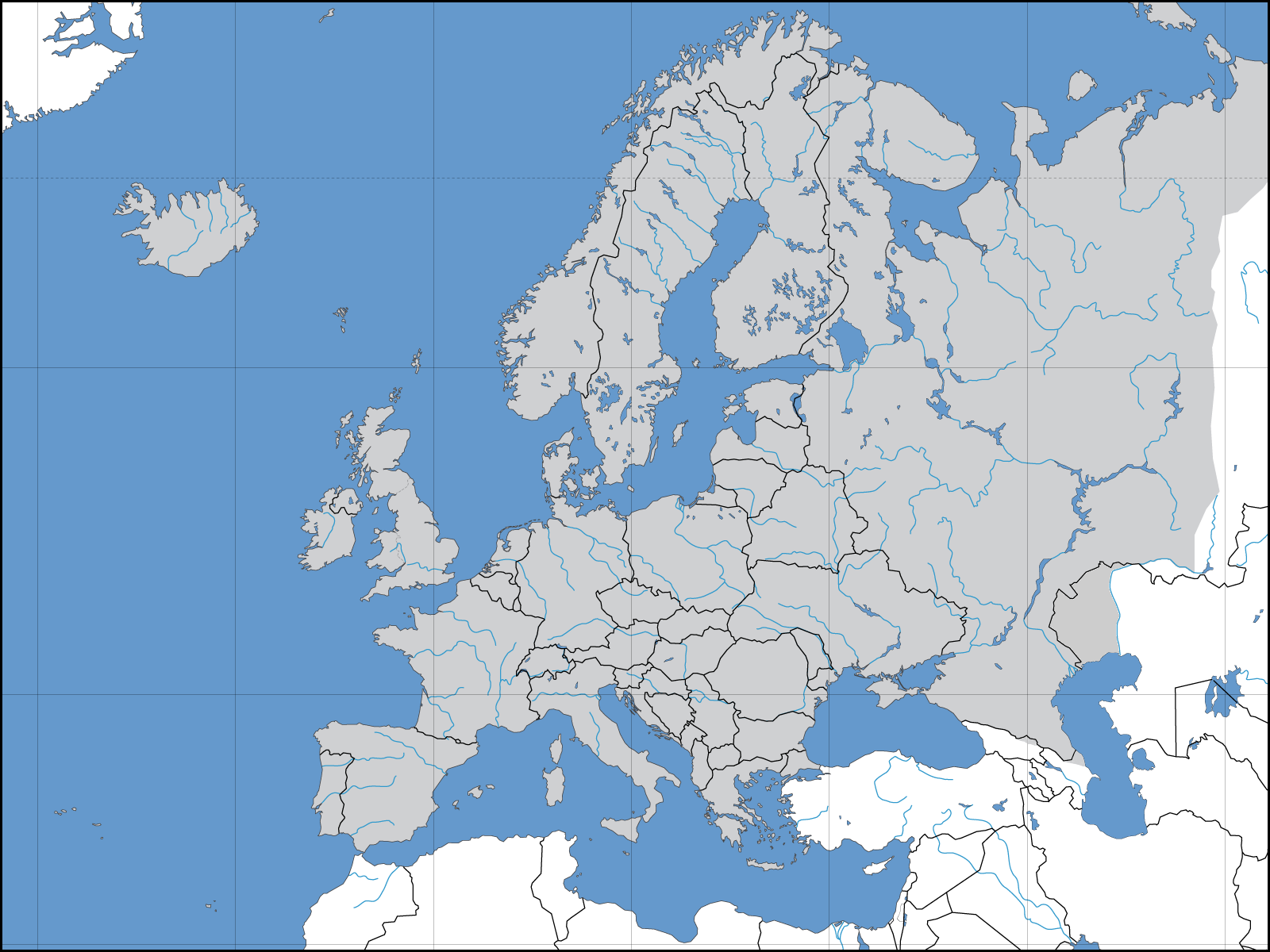

- Bydgoszcz
- Cardiff
- Copenhagen
- Daugavpils
- Eskilstuna
- Gelsenkirchen
- Krško
- Målilla
- Prague
- Wrocław

== Qualification for Grand Prix ==
For the 2007 season, there were 15 permanent riders joined at each Grand Prix by one wild card. The top eight riders from the 2006 championship qualified as of right, although as Hans Andersen had already qualified the 9th placed rider was also included. These eight qualifiers were, in championship order:-

- (1) Jason Crump (Australia)
- (2) Greg Hancock (United States)
- (3) Nicki Pedersen (Denmark)
- (4) Andreas Jonsson (Sweden)
- (5) Leigh Adams (Australia)
- (7) Matej Žagar (Slovenia)
- (8) Tomasz Gollob (Poland)
- (9) Jarosław Hampel (Poland)

They were joined by three riders who qualified via the Grand Prix Qualifying final. These riders were, in order by qualifying position:-

- (13) Wiesław Jaguś (Poland)
- (14) Rune Holta (Poland)
- (6) Hans Andersen (Denmark)

The final four riders were nominated by series promoters, Benfield Sports International, following the completion of the 2006 Grand Prix season.

- (10) Antonio Lindbäck (Sweden)
- (11) Scott Nicholls (United Kingdom)
- (12) Bjarne Pedersen (Denmark)
- (15) Chris Harris (United Kingdom)

== Calendar ==
Round	Date	City and venue	Winner	Runner-up	3rd placed	4th placed	Results
1	28 April	(Italy) Lonigo , Italy; Stadio Speedway Santa Marina	(Denmark) Nicki Pedersen	(United States) Greg Hancock	(Poland) Wiesław Jaguś	(Australia) Jason Crump	results
2	12 May	Wrocław , Poland; Olympic Stadium	(Denmark) Nicki Pedersen	(Denmark) Hans N. Andersen	(United Kingdom) Chris Harris	(Australia) Jason Crump	results
3	26 May	(Sweden) Eskilstuna , Sweden; Smedstadion	(Australia) Leigh Adams	(Denmark) Hans N. Andersen	(Sweden) Fredrik Lindgren	(Denmark) Nicki Pedersen	results
4	9 June	(Denmark) Copenhagen , Denmark; Parken Stadium	(Sweden) Andreas Jonsson	(Denmark) Nicki Pedersen	(Australia) Leigh Adams	(Poland) Tomasz Gollob	results
5	30 June	(United Kingdom) Cardiff , Great Britain; Millennium Stadium	(United Kingdom) Chris Harris	(United States) Greg Hancock	(Australia) Jason Crump	(Australia) Leigh Adams	results
6	28 July	(Czech Republic) Prague , Czech Republic; Markéta Stadium	(Denmark) Nicki Pedersen	(Poland) Jarosław Hampel	(Poland) Rune Holta	(United Kingdom) Scott Nicholls	results
7	11 August	Målilla , Sweden; G&B Stadium	(Australia) Leigh Adams	(Poland) Tomasz Gollob	(Australia) Jason Crump	(Denmark) Hans N. Andersen	results
8	25 August	(Latvia) Daugavpils , Latvia; Latvijas Spīdveja Centrs	(Australia) Leigh Adams	(Denmark) Nicki Pedersen	(Poland) Tomasz Gollob	(United Kingdom) Scott Nicholls	results
9	8 September	(Poland) Bydgoszcz , Poland; Polonia Stadium	(Poland) Tomasz Gollob	(Poland) Krzysztof Kasprzak	(Denmark) Nicki Pedersen	(Sweden) Andreas Jonsson	results
10	22 September	(Slovenia) Krško , Slovenia; Matija Gubec Stadium	(Denmark) Nicki Pedersen	(United Kingdom) Scott Nicholls	(Poland) Rune Holta	(Australia) Jason Crump	results
11	13 October	(Germany) Gelsenkirchen , Germany; Veltins-Arena	(Sweden) Andreas Jonsson	(United States) Greg Hancock	(Australia) Jason Crump	(Australia) Leigh Adams	results

== Final standings ==
Qualifies for next season's Grand Prix series
Full-time Grand Prix rider
Wild card, track reserve or qualified reserve

Pos.	Rider	Points	ITA (Italy)	EUR (Poland)	SWE (Sweden)	DEN (Denmark)	GBR (United Kingdom)	CZE (Czech Republic)	SCA (Sweden)	LAT (Latvia)	POL (Poland)	SVN (Slovenia)	GER (Germany)
Gold	(Denmark) (3) Nicki Pedersen	196	24	23	11	16	12	24	16	19	19	23	9
Silver	(Australia) (5) Leigh Adams	153	12	10	21	18	14	8	19	22	9	9	11
Bronze	(Australia) (1) Jason Crump	124	12	13	4	9	15	11	15	10	7	13	15
4	(Poland) (8) Tomasz Gollob	108	10	3	9	11	3	1	19	14	21	10	7
5	(Denmark) (6) Hans Andersen	107	9	13	20	12	13	8	12	5	3	3	9
6	(United States) (2) Greg Hancock	106	19	15	9	7	17	6	5	3	5	4	16
7	(Poland) (14) Rune Holta	91 (+3)	2	6	9	5	5	16	5	7	10	16	10
8	(United Kingdom) (11) Scott Nicholls	91 (+2)	4	6	4	7	9	12	8	13	4	16	8
9	(United Kingdom) (15) Chris Harris	91 (+F)	7	15	9	5	20	5	6	7	5	8	4
10	(Sweden) (4) Andreas Jonsson	90	7	5	5	16	5	7	–	8	11	6	20
11	(Poland) (13) Wiesław Jaguś	81	14	6	6	3	0	9	12	11	5	9	6
12	(Denmark) (12) Bjarne Pedersen	77	5	8	3	5	7	6	7	8	8	9	11
13	(Poland) (9) Jarosław Hampel	67	8	6	5	7	8	16	–	–	11	6	–
14	(Slovenia) (7) Matej Žagar	54	5	7	7	1	5	8	3	2	4	6	6
15	(Sweden) (10) Antonio Lindbäck	31	3	0	3	9	7	0	3	0	5	1	–
16	(Sweden) (16) Fredrik Lindgren	21	–	–	14	–	–	–	7	–	–	–	–
17	(Poland) (16) Krzysztof Kasprzak	17	–	–	–	–	–	–	–	–	17	–	–
18	(Sweden) (19) Peter Karlsson	13	–	–	–	–	–	–	5	–	–	–	8
19	(Denmark) (16) Kenneth Bjerre	10	–	–	–	10	–	–	–	–	–	–	–
20	(Russia) (16) Grigory Laguta	8	–	–	–	–	–	–	–	8	–	–	–
21	(Poland) (16) Sebastian Ułamek	6	–	6	–	–	–	–	–	–	–	–	–
22	(Croatia) (16) Jurica Pavlič	5	–	–	–	–	–	–	–	–	–	5	–
23	(Sweden) (17) Jonas Davidsson	5	–	–	5	–	–	–	ns	–	–	–	–
24	(Finland) (20) Kai Laukkanen	5	–	–	–	–	–	–	2	3	–	–	0
25	(United Kingdom) (16) David Howe	4	–	–	–	–	4	–	–	–	–	–	–
26	(Czech Republic) (16) Luboš Tomíček, Jr.	4	–	–	–	–	–	4	–	–	–	–	–
27	(Germany) (16) Christian Hefenbrock	4	–	–	–	–	–	–	–	–	–	–	4
28	(Czech Republic) (17) Josef Franc	3	–	–	–	–	–	3	–	–	–	–	–
29	(Italy) (16) Mattia Carpanese	2	2	–	–	–	–	–	–	–	–	–	–
30	(Denmark) (18) Morten Risager	2	–	–	–	2	–	–	–	–	–	–	–
31	(Latvia) (18) Maksims Bogdanovs	2	–	–	–	–	–	–	–	2	–	–	–
32	(Poland) (17) Tomasz Gapiński	1	–	1	–	–	–	–	–	–	–	–	–
33	(Latvia) (17) Kasts Poudzuks	1	–	–	–	–	–	–	–	1	–	–	–
34	(Italy) (17) Daniele Tessari	0	0	–	–	–	–	–	–	–	–	–	–
35	(Denmark) (17) Jesper B. Jensen	0	–	–	0	–	–	–	–	–	–	–	–
36	(Italy) (18) Christian Miotello	0	0	–	–	–	–	–	–	–	–	–	–
37	(Sweden) (18) Eric Andersson	0	–	–	0	–	–	–	–	–	–	–	–
38	(Czech Republic) (18) Matěj Kůs	0	-	-	-	-	-	0	-	-	-	-	-
Rider(s) not classified
	(United Kingdom) (17) Edward Kennett	-	-	-	-	-	ns	-	-	-	-	-	-
	(Poland) (17) Krzysztof Buczkowski	-	-	-	-	-	-	-	-	-	ns	-	-
	(Slovenia) (17) Jernej Kolenko	-	-	-	-	-	-	-	-	-	-	ns	-
	(Germany) (17) Martin Smolinski	-	-	-	-	-	-	-	-	-	-	-	ns
	(Poland) (18) Tomasz Jędrzejak	-	-	ns	-	-	-	-	-	-	-	-	-
	(United Kingdom) (18) Daniel King	-	-	-	-	-	ns	-	-	-	-	-	-
	(Sweden) (18) Sebastian Aldén	-	-	-	-	-	-	-	ns	-	-	-	-
	(Poland) (18) Adrian Miedziński	-	-	-	-	-	-	-	-	-	ns	-	-
	(Slovenia) (18) Izak Šantej	-	-	-	-	-	-	-	-	-	-	ns	-
	(Germany) (18) Tobias Kroner	-	-	-	-	-	-	-	-	-	-	-	ns
Pos.	Rider	Points	ITA (Italy)	EUR (Poland)	SWE (Sweden)	DEN (Denmark)	GBR (United Kingdom)	CZE (Czech Republic)	SCA (Sweden)	LAT (Latvia)	POL (Poland)	SVN (Slovenia)	GER (Germany)
