= Wiesław Jaguś =

Polish speedway rider

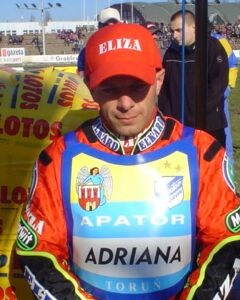
- Born: 13 September 1975 (age 51); Toruń, Poland
- Nationality: Polish

Career history

Poland
- 1992–2010: Apator Toruń

Sweden
- 2002: Örnarna
- 2003–2005: Vetlanda
- 2007–2009: Smederna
- 2009: Piraterna
- 2010: Rospiggarna

Denmark
- 2005: Fredericia

Individual honours
- 2006: GP Challenge winner

Team honours
- 2006: European Pairs Champion
- 2004: Polish Pairs Speedway Champion
- 2001, 2008: Ekstraliga Champion
- 1993, 1996, 1998: Polish Cup

Wiesław Jaguś (born 13 September 1975) is a former Polish speedway rider.

== Career ==
In August 2006, during the Speedway Grand Prix Qualification, Jaguś won the GP Challenge, which ensured that he claimed a permanent slot for the 2007 Grand Prix. He duly rode in the 2007 Speedway Grand Prix series.

Jaguś won the European Pairs Champion in 2007. He retired from competitive speedway at the close of the 2010 season, after starting his career in 1992. He was nominated to "2008 Toruń Citizen of the Year" by Gazeta Wyborcza.

Jaguś rode 19 seasons from 1992 to 2010 for Apator Toruń in Poland.

== Family ==
Jaguś' brother Marcin was also a speedway rider.

== Results ==
=== Speedway Grand Prix ===
2004 Speedway Grand Prix Final Championship standings (Riding No 24)
Race no.	Grand Prix	Pos.	Pts.	Heats	Draw No
3 /9	(Europe) European SGP	18	4	(0,3,1)	24

2006 Speedway Grand Prix Final Championship standings (Riding No 16)
Race no.	Grand Prix	Pos.	Pts.	Heats	Draw No
10 /10	(Poland) Polish SGP	4	16	(3,2,3,1,0) +3 +0	12

2007 Speedway Grand Prix Final Championship standings (Riding No 13)
Race no.	Grand Prix	Pos.	Pts.	Heats	Draw No
1 /11	(Italy) Italian SGP	3	14	(0,3,3,3,1) +2 +1	16
2 /11	(Europe) European SGP	12	6	(2,2,0,2,0)	10
3 /11	(Sweden) Swedish SGP	10	6	(0,3,3,F/-,-)	6
4 /11	(Denmark) Danish SGP	15	3	(1,1,0,1,0)	3
5 /11	(United Kingdom) British SGP	16	0	(0,0,0,0,0)	5
6 /11	(Czech Republic) Czech Rep. SGP	6	9	(1,3,1,0,3) +1	8
7 /11	(Sweden) Scandinavian SGP	6	12	(2,3,3,1,3) +0	14
8 /11	(Latvia) Latvian SGP	5	11	(1,3,1,2,3) +1	8
9 /11	(Poland) Polish SGP	13	5	(2,1,0,1,1)	5
10 /11	(Slovenia) Slovenian SGP	8	9	(1,3,3,1,1) +0	15
11 /11	(Germany) German SGP	12	6	(1,3,0,2,0)	11

permanent speedway rider
wild card, track reserve or qualified reserve
rider not classified (track reserve who did not start)

=== Individual World Championship (Speedway Grand Prix) ===
- 2004 – 31st place (wild card)
- 2006 – 17th place (wild card)
- 2007

=== Individual Under-21 World Championship ===
- 1996 – 14th place – 4 points (X,0,1,3,0)

=== Team World Championship (Speedway World Cup) ===
- 2006 – 5th place – 5 points in Semi-Final A (2,1,1,1,-)

=== European Pairs Championship ===
  - 2006 – European Champion – 13 points in Final (3,1,3,3,3,0)

=== Club Champions' Cup ===
- 2002 – Bronze medal – 19 points in Final (4,2,1,8J,3,1)
  - 2009 - (Poland) Toruń – Runner-up (5 pts) Toruń

=== Individual Polish Championship ===
- 1998 – Bronze medal
- 1999 – 15th place
- 2001 – 7th place
- 2003 – 4th place
- 2004 – 14th place
- 2006 – Silver medal
- 2007 – 13th place

=== Individual Under-21 Polish Championship ===
- 1994 – 10th place
- 1996 – 14th place

=== Polish Pairs Speedway Championship ===
- 2003 – Bronze medal
- 2004 – Polish Champion
- 2005 – 5th place

=== Polish Under-21 Pairs Championship ===
- 1994 – Bronze medal
- 1995 – Bronze medal
- 1996 – 6th place

=== Team Polish Championship ===
- 1992 – Bronze medal
- 1993 – Bronze medal
- 1994 – Bronze medal
- 1995 – Silver medal
- 1996 – Silver medal
- 2001 – Polish Champion
- 2003 – Silver medal
- 2007 – Silver medal
- 2008 – Polish Champion
- 2009 – Silver medal

=== Team Polish Cup ===
- 1993 – Gold medal
- 1996 – Gold medal
- 1998 – Gold medal
- 1999 – Silver medal

=== Golden Helmet ===
- 1999 – 13th place
- 2002 – 8th place
- 2003 – 4th place
- 2004 – Gold medal
- 2006 – 4th place

== See also ==
- List of Speedway Grand Prix riders
- Poland national speedway team
