= David Howe (speedway rider) =

British motorcycle speedway rider

- Born: 1 March 1982 (age 44); Leicester, England
- Nationality: British (English)

Career history

Great Britain
- 1997–2001: Peterborough Panthers
- 2011–2013: King's Lynn Stars
- 2002–2005, 2007–2008: Wolverhampton Wolves
- 2006: Oxford Cheetahs
- 2009–2015: Scunthorpe Scorpions
- 2015: Glasgow Tigers
- 2017: Berwick Bandits

Poland
- 2002–2003: Tarnów
- 2005: Rawicz
- 2008: Grudziądz
- 2009: Lublin

Sweden
- 2000: Filbyterna
- 2001–2002, 2007: Örnarna
- 2003–2004, 2006: Smederna

Individual honours
- 2000: British Under-21 Champion
- 2005: Scottish Open Champion

Team honours
- 1999, 2002: Elite League (tier 1)
- 1999, 2001: Knockout Cup
- 1999: Craven Shield
- 1999: Premier League (tier 2)
- 2001: Allsvenskan Winner

David Peter Howe (born 1 March 1982) is a former motorcycle speedway rider from England.

== Career ==
Born in Leicester, England, Howe started his career on 31 March 1997, aged 15, with the Peterborough Panthers team in the Conference League. After winning the Premier League in 1998 with Peterborough Panthers he was part of the squad that won the treble with Peterborough: the Elite League, the Knockout Cup and the Craven Shield.

Howe won the British Under-21 Championship in 2000 and in 2002 he finished third in the World Under-21 Championship. After collecting a second Knockout Cup winners medal, he left Peterborough after the 2001 season to join Wolverhampton Wolves. His switch to the Midlands club resulted in immediate success because the team won the Elite League.

In 2003, Howe reached his fifth World Under 21 final and featured in the Speedway Grand Prix for the first time, having been awarded a wild card place for 2003 Speedway Grand Prix series in Britain and Slovenia. He would later ride as a wild card for the 2007 Speedway Grand Prix of Great Britain, awarded to him after finishing runner-up in the 2007 British Championship.

Howe spent six seasons at Wolverhampton (split by one season with Oxford Cheetahs) before he joined Scunthorpe Scorpions in 2009. In 2011, he rode in his tenth and last British final. He became the club captain at Scunthorpe and rode for them for seven seasons before his Scunthorpe riding career came to an end after 2015.

Howe was also successful in both Grasstrack and Longtrack having competed at the highest level of both disciplines and used GM engines that were tuned by Sean Wilson.

After two seasons with Berwick Bandits, Howe announced his retirement from the sport at the end of the 2018 season. At retirement he had earned four international caps for the Great Britain national speedway team.

== Management ==
Howe had retained a relationship with Scunthorpe Scorpions, helping Ryan Douglas with his engines before he was appointed the team manager of the Scunthorpe Scorpions for the 2024 season, replacing Dave Peet.

== Major results ==
=== Speedway Grand Prix ===
2007 Speedway Grand Prix Final Championship standings (Riding No 16)
Race no.	Grand Prix	Pos.	Pts.	Heats	Draw No
5 /11	(United Kingdom) British SGP	14	4	(0,2,0,1,1)	3

permanent speedway rider
wild card, track reserve or qualified reserve
rider not classified (track reserve who did not start)

=== World Longtrack Championship ===
Grand-Prix

- 2001 – One G.P. (N/S Reserve)
- 2012 – Two G.P. 8pts (21st)
- 2013 – Four G.P. 46pts (15th)
- 2014 – Three G.P. 29pts (12th)

Best Grand-Prix Result

- Third - 2013 – (France) Marmande

=== European Grasstrack Championship ===
Finals

- 2011 – (England) Skegness 20pts (6th)
- 2013 – (Germany) Bielefeld 14pts (8th)
- 2014 – (France) St. Macaire 16pts (Second)
