= Tomasz Jędrzejak =

Polish speedway rider

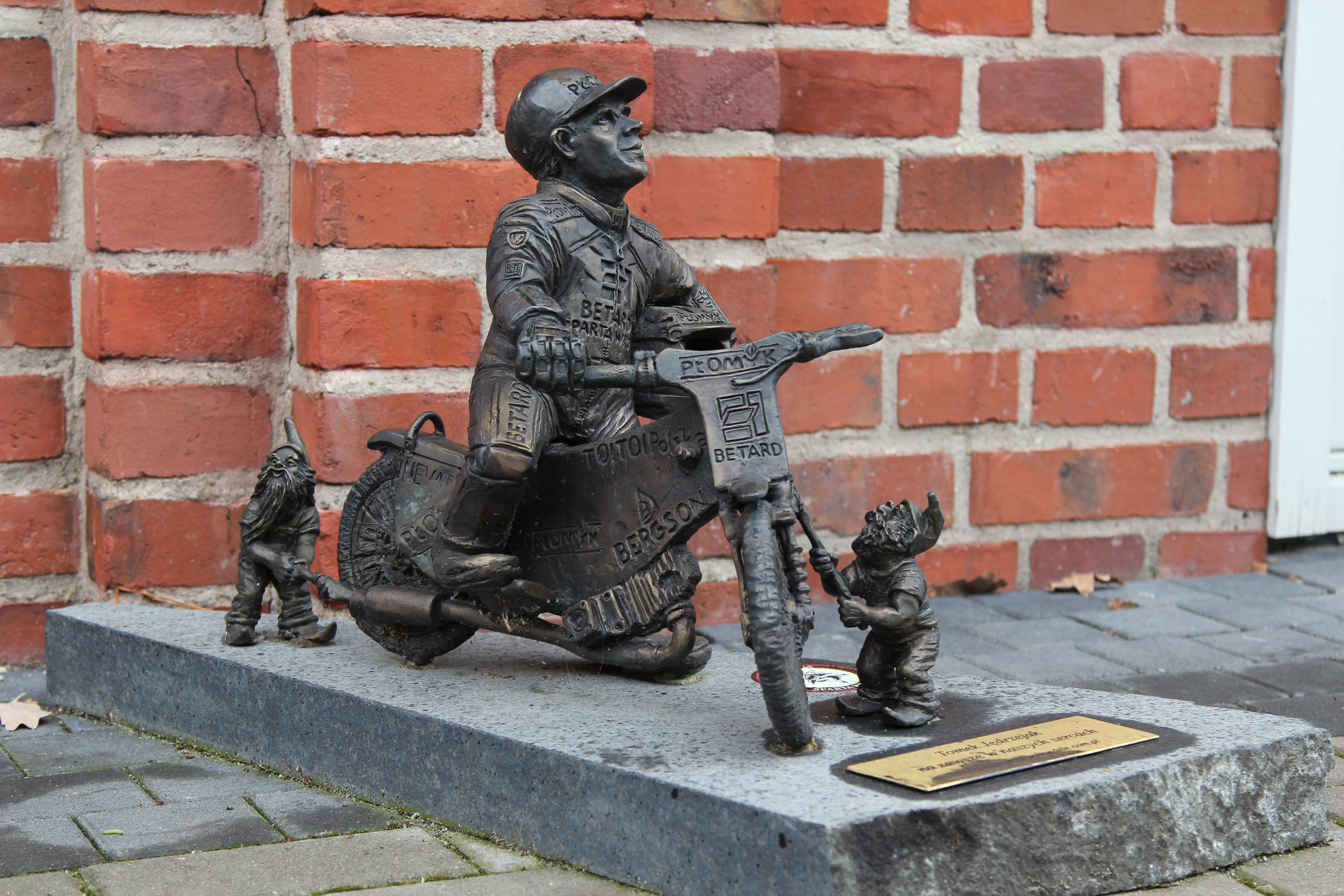
- Born: 14 July 1979; Ostrów Wielkopolski, Poland
- Died: 14 August 2018 (aged 39); Wrocław, Poland
- Nationality: Polish

Career history

Poland
- 1996–1999, 2004–2006: Ostrów
- 2000–2001: Częstochowa
- 2002–2003, 2007–2009, 2011–2017: Wrocław
- 2010: Tarnów
- 2018: Rzeszów

Great Britain
- 2001–2004: Belle Vue
- 2008: Lakeside
- 2010: Eastbourne

Sweden
- 2004–2007: Vetlanda
- 2008: Lejonen
- 2010–2014: Västervik

Denmark
- 2003–2004: Kronjylland
- 2007, 2010–2011: Fjelsted

Individual honours
- 2012: Polish Champion

Tomasz Jędrzejak (14 July 1979 – 14 August 2018) was a Polish motorcycle speedway rider that earned international caps for the Poland national speedway team.

== Career ==
Jędrzejak became a Polish Individual Speedway Champion in 2012.

Jędrzejak first rode in Great Britain in 2001 when he joined the Belle Vue Aces. He spent four seasons with the Manchester club despite a work permit issue in 2002. He returned to Britain in 2008 with the Lakeside Hammers. His final British season was in 2010 with Eastbourne Eagles.

In 2018, Jędrzejak was found dead in Wrocław, Poland, aged 39.

== Results ==
=== Speedway Grand Prix results ===
2007 SGP
	Grand Prix	Pos.	Pts.	Heats	Draw
—	(Poland) Wrocław	18			18

permanent speedway rider
wild card, track reserve or qualified reserve
rider not classified (track reserve who did not start)

=== World Championships ===
- Individual World Championship (Speedway Grand Prix)
  - 2007 – not classified – track reserve in Wrocław

=== European Championships ===
- Individual European Championship
  - 2001 – 13th place (5 points)
- European Club Champions' Cup
  - 2007 – Silver medal (5 points)

=== Domestic competitions ===
- Individual Polish Championship
  - 2003 – Bronze medal
  - 2009 – 12th place in Semi-Final 2
  - 2012 – Gold medal
- Polish Pairs Championship
  - 2000 – Bronze medal
  - 2001 – Bronze medal
- Polish Pairs U-21 Championship
  - 1999 – Winner
- Team Polish Championship (League)
  - 2002 – Bronze medal
- Team U-21 Polish Championship
  - 2000 – Winner

== See also ==
- Poland national speedway team
