= Tomasz Gapiński =

Polish speedway rider

- Born: 8 July 1982 (age 44); Piła, Poland
- Nationality: Polish

Career history

Poland
- 1999–2003, 2017–2018, 2025: Piła
- 2004–2007: Wrocław
- 2008–2009: Częstochowa
- 2010, 2013–2015: Gorzów
- 2011–2012: Bydgoszcz
- 2016, 2023–2024: Łódź
- 2019–2022: Ostrów

Sweden
- 2004–2005: Kaparna
- 2007–2008: Hammarby
- 2009: Västervik
- 2010–2012: Valsarna
- 2013–2014: Vargarna
- 2021: Vetlanda
- 2022: Rospiggarna

Denmark
- 2010–2011: Holstebro
- 2015, 2019–2021: Region Varde

Team honours
- 1999, 2006: Team Polish Champion

Tomasz Gapiński (born 8 July 1982 in Piła, Poland) is an international motorcycle speedway rider.

== Career ==
Gapiński rode in the 2007 Speedway Grand Prix of Europe. He won the Team Polish Champion titles in 1999 and 2006.

Gapiński missed most of the 2023 season following broken arm injuries.

== Results ==
=== Speedway Grand Prix results ===
Year	Position	Points	Best Finish
2006	-	-	18th place in European SGP
2007	32nd	1	16th place in European SGP

=== World Championships ===
- Individual World Championship (Speedway Grand Prix)
  - 2006 - notclassify (0 heats in European SGP)
  - 2007 - 32nd place (1 point in European SGP)
- Individual U-21 World Championship

=== European Championships ===
- Individual European Championship
  - 2005 - (Italy) Lonigo - 11th place (5 points)
  - 2008 - injury in before Semi-Final 3
- European Pairs Championship
  - 2004 - (Hungary) Debrecen - Bronze medal (5 points)
- European Club Champions' Cup
  - 2007 - (Hungary) Miskolc - Runner-up (10 points)

=== Polish competitions ===
- Individual Polish Championship
  - 2008 - injury before Semi-Final 2
  - 2009 - 17th place in Quarter-Final 3
- Team Polish Championship
  - 1999 - Polish Champion
  - 2000 - Runner-up
  - 2004 - Runner-up
  - 2006 - Polish Champion
  - 2007 - Bronze medal
- Golden Helmet
  - 2004 - (Poland) Bydgoszcz - Runner-up
  - 2008 - (Poland) Rzeszów - injury before meeting
- Silver Helmet U-21
  - 2003 - (Poland) Bydgoszcz - Bronze medal
- Mieczysław Połukard Criterium of Polish Speedway Leagues Aces - (Poland) Bydgoszcz
  - 2006 - 10th place (7 points)

== See also ==
- Poland national speedway team
- List of Speedway Grand Prix riders
