= Mattia Carpanese =

Italian speedway rider

- Born: 5 November 1985 (age 41); Padua, Italy
- Nationality: Italian

Career history
- 2007: Workington Comets
- 2008: Birmingham Brummies

Individual honours
- 2004, 2005: Italian Under-21 Champion
- 2006, 2007, 2008 2010, 2011, 2014: Italian National Champion

Mattia Carpanese born (5 November 1985 in Padua, Italy) is a former motorcycle speedway rider from Italy. He is six times National champion of Italy.

== Career ==
Carpanese rode in the United Kingdom for the Workington Comets during the 2007 Premier League, and for the Birmingham Brummies in 2008.

Carpanese finished runner-up in the Italian Championship in 2005. He was selected as a wild card for the 2006 and 2007 Italian Speedway Grand Prix. He quit the Comets after a string of injuries on 30 August 2007.

On 20 April 2008, it was announced that Carpanese had been signed by Birmingham Brummies as a short term replacement for injured rider James Birkinshaw but was released after twenty eight days.

== Speedway Grand Prix ==
2007 Speedway Grand Prix Final Championship standings (Riding No 16)
Race no.	Grand Prix	Pos.	Pts.	Heats	Draw No
1 /11	(Italy) Italian SGP	16	2	(0,2,M,F,0)	9

permanent speedway rider
wild card, track reserve or qualified reserve
rider not classified (track reserve who did not start)

== Honours ==
=== World Championships ===
- Team World Championship (Speedway World Cup)
  - 2005 - 4th place in Qualifying round 2 (1 point)
  - 2006 - 4th place in Qualifying round 2 (7 points)
  - 2007 - 3rd place in Qualifying round 2 (12 points)
  - 2009 - 3rd place in Qualifying round 1 (9 points)
  - 2010 - 4th place in Qualifying round 2 (11 points)
- Individual U-21 World Championship
  - 2006 - 13th place (5 points)

=== European Championships ===
- Individual European Championship
  - 2007 - 12th place in Qualifying Round 1 (4 points)
  - 2008 Final will be on 2008-08-23 (track reserve)
- European Pairs Championship
  - 2004 - 7th place in Semi-Final 1 (1 point)
  - 2007 - 7th place (0 points)
  - 2009 - 3rd place in Semi-Final

== See also ==
- Italy national speedway team
- List of Speedway Grand Prix riders
