= Daniele Tessari =

Italian motorcycle speedway rider (born 1984)

- Born: 20 August 1984 (age 42); Albaredo d'Adige, Italy
- Nationality: Italian

Career history

Great Britain
- 2006–2007: Edinburgh

Individual honours
- 2002: Italian U21 champion
- 2022: Italian Championship silver

Daniele Tessari (born 20 August 1984) is a former motorcycle speedway rider from Italy.

== Career ==
Tessari rode in Speedway Grand Prix of Italy. He joined Edinburgh Monarchs in 2006 and spent two seasons with the club.

Tessari represented Italy at the 2021 Speedway of Nations and the 2022 Speedway of Nations.

In 2022, Tessari finished runner-up in the Italian Individual Speedway Championship.

== Results ==
=== World Championships ===
- Individual World Championship and Speedway Grand Prix
  - 2005 - 31st place (0 pts in one event)
  - 2006 - 31st place (0 pts in one event)
  - 2007 - 34th place (0 pts in one event)
- Team World Championship (Speedway World Team Cup and Speedway World Cup)
  - 2003 - 12th place
  - 2004 - 7th place

=== European Championships ===
- Individual European Championship
  - 2005 - (Italy) Lonigo - 15th place (2 pts)
- European Pairs Championship
  - 2004 - 6th place in Semi-Final 1
  - 2006 - 6th place in Semi-Final 2

== See also ==
- Italy national speedway team
- List of Speedway Grand Prix riders
