= 2009 Speedway Grand Prix of Scandinavia =

(Sweden) 2009 Speedway Grand Prix of Scandinavia
- 2009 FIM Nordicbet Scandinavian Speedway Grand Prix

Information
- Date: 15 August 2009
- City: (Sweden) Målilla
- Event: 7 of 11 (118)
- Referee: (Poland) Wojciech Grodzki
- Jury President: (Finland) Ilkka Teromaa

Stadium details
- Stadium: G&B Stadium
- Capacity: 15,000
- Length: 305 m (334 yd)

SGP Results
- Best Time
- (gold) Winner: (Poland) Tomasz Gollob
- (silver) Runner-up: (Australia) Jason Crump
- (bronze) 3rd place: (Denmark) Hans N. Andersen

The 2009 FIM Speedway World Championship Grand Prix of Scandinavia was the 6th race of the 2009 Speedway Grand Prix season. It took place on 15 August in the G&B Stadium in Målilla, Sweden.

The Grand Prix was won by Pole Tomasz Gollob who beat Jason Crump, Hans N. Andersen and Kenneth Bjerre in the final. It was first GP winning in this season for Gollob.

== Riders ==
The Speedway Grand Prix Commission nominated Antonio Lindbäck as a Wild Card, and Simon Gustafsson and Ludvig Lindgren, both as Track Reserve. The riders' starting positions draw for Grand Prix meeting was made on 14 August by Ilkka Teromaa, FIM Jury President.

== Heat details ==
Placing	Draw	Rider	Total	1	2	3	4	5	6	7	8	9	10	11	12	13	14	15	16	17	18	19	20	Pts	Pos	21	22	23
1	15	(Poland) (3) Tomasz Gollob	22				3			2			2						3	3				13	1	3		3
2	13	(Australia) (2) Jason Crump	18				1	3							2		3					2		11	2		3	2
3	14	(Denmark) (5) Hans N. Andersen	14				0		3					1		3							3	10	3		2	1
4	16	(Denmark) (12) Kenneth Bjerre	10				2				3	R4						3			0			8	6	2		0
5	10	(Sweden) (7) Andreas Jonsson	10			3			2						3			2		0				10	4	0
6	1	(Sweden) (16) Antonio Lindbäck	10	3				1				1				2				2				9	5		1
7	3	(Sweden) (10) Fredrik Lindgren	9	2						0				2				1				3		8	7	1
8	5	(United Kingdom) (11) Chris Harris	8		3			2					1					0					2	8	8		0
9	8	(United States) (4) Greg Hancock	8		1						1			3			2			1				8	9
10	11	(Denmark) (1) Nicki Pedersen	7			1				3		2					0						1	7	10
11	9	(Poland) (13) Grzegorz Walasek	6			2		R4						R4					1		3			6	11
12	6	(Poland) (14) Sebastian Ułamek	5		0				0			3							2			0		5	12
13	12	(Australia) (6) Leigh Adams	5			0					0		3			1						1		5	13
14	2	(United Kingdom) (9) Scott Nicholls	5	1					1				0				1				2			5	14
15	7	(Russia) (15) Emil Sayfutdinov	5		2					1					1	F2x					1			5	15
16	4	(Poland) (8) Rune Holta	2	R4							2				0				0				0	2	16
17	17	(Sweden) (17) Simon Gustafsson	-																					-	17
18	18	(Sweden) (18) Ludvig Lindgren	-																					-	18
Placing	Draw	Rider	Total	1	2	3	4	5	6	7	8	9	10	11	12	13	14	15	16	17	18	19	20	Pts	Pos	21	22	23

e: retired or mechanical failure • m: exclusion for exceeding two minute time allowance • t: exclusion for touching the tapes • x: other exclusion • f: fell
ns: non-starter • nc: non-classify
Semi-finals: Heat 21: Riders placed 1st, 4th, 6th & 7th in the intermediate classification (after 20 heats)
Heat 22: Riders placed 2nd, 3rd, 5th & 8th in the intermediate classification (after 20 heats)
Big Final (heat 23): The first and second placed riders in each of the Semi-Finals

gate A – inside	gate B	gate C	gate D – outside

=== Heat after heat ===
1. Lindbäck, Lindgren, Nicholls, Holta (R4)
2. Harris, Sayfutdinov, Hancock, Ułamek
3. Jonsson, Walasek, Pedersen, Adams
4. Gollob, Bjerre, Crump, Andersen
5. Crump, Harris, Lindbäck, Walasek (R4)
6. Andersen, Jonsson, Nicholls, Ułamek
7. Pedersen, Gollob, Sayfutdinov, Lindgren
8. Bjerre, Holta, Hancock, Adams
9. Ułamek, Pedersen, Lindbäck, Bjerre (R4)
10. Adams, Gollob, Harris, Nicholls
11. Hancock, Lindgren, Andersen, Walasek (R4)
12. Jonsson, Crump, Sayfutdinov, Holta
13. Andersen, Lindbäck, Adams, Sayfutdinov(F2x)
14. Crump, Hancock, Nicholls, Pedersen
15. Bjerre, Jonsson, Lindgren, Harris
16. Gollob, Ułamek, Walasek, Holta
17. Gollob, Lindbäck, Hancock, Jonsson
18. Walasek, Nicholls, Sayfutdinov, Bjerre
19. Lindgren, Crump, Adams, Ułamek
20. Andersen, Harris, Pedersen, Holta
  Semi-Finals:
21. Gollob, Bjerre, Lindgren, Jonsson
22. Crump, Andersen, Lindbäck, Harris
  The Final:
23. Gollob (6 pts), Crump (4 pts), Andersen (2 pts), Bjerre (0 pts)

== The intermediate classification ==
Qualifies for next season's Grand Prix series
Full-time Grand Prix rider
Wild card, track reserve or qualified reserve

Pos.	Rider	Points	CZE (Czech Republic)	EUR (Poland)	SWE (Sweden)	DEN (Denmark)	GBR (United Kingdom)	LAT (Latvia)	SCA (Sweden)	NOR (Denmark)	SVN (Slovenia)	ITA (Italy)	POL (Poland)
1	(Australia) (2) Jason Crump	126	14	22	16	22	24	10	18				
2	(Poland) (3) Tomasz Gollob	91	7	17	7	13	9	16	22				
3	(United States) (4) Greg Hancock	87	10	16	5	14	14	20	8				
4	(Russia) (15) Emil Sayfutdinov	82	17	9	20	14	7	10	5				
5	(Sweden) (7) Andreas Jonsson	67	11	16	12	7	5	6	10				
6	(Sweden) (10) Fredrik Lindgren	64	19	2	9	3	16	6	9				
7	(Denmark) (12) Kenneth Bjerre	63	10	5	8	8	7	15	10				
8	(Denmark) (5) Hans N. Andersen	61	6	6	5	6	15	9	14				
9	(Denmark) (1) Nicki Pedersen	59	12	9	13	10	8	–	7				
10	(Australia) (6) Leigh Adams	47	13	6	3	6	3	11	5				
11	(Poland) (14) Sebastian Ułamek	46	5	8	6	8	8	6	5				
12	(Poland) (8) Rune Holta	43	3	8	11	5	7	7	2				
13	(United Kingdom) (11) Chris Harris	43	6	5	5	5	9	5	8				
14	(Poland) (13) Grzegorz Walasek	37	6	5	6	7	1	6	6				
15	(Sweden) (16) Antonio Lindbäck	27	–	–	17	–	–	–	10				
16	(United Kingdom) (9) Scott Nicholls	25	4	1	1	5	6	3	5				
17	(Denmark) (16) (19) Niels Kristian Iversen	19	–	–	–	11	–	8	–				
18	(Poland) (16) Jarosław Hampel	9	–	9	–	–	–	–	–				
19	(Russia) (16) Grigory Laguta	6	–	–	–	–	–	6	–				
20	(United Kingdom) (16) Edward Kennett	4	–	–	–	–	4	–	–				
21	(Czech Republic) (16) Matěj Kůs	1	1	–	–	–	–	–	–				
Rider(s) not classified
	(Czech Republic) (17) Luboš Tomíček, Jr.	—	ns	–	–	–	–	–	–				
	(Poland) (17) Damian Baliński	—	–	ns	–	–	–	–	–				
	(Sweden) (17) Ricky Kling	—	–	–	ns	–	–	–	–				
	(Denmark) (17) Patrick Hougaard	—	–	–	–	ns	–	–	–				
	(United Kingdom) (17) Tai Woffinden	—	–	–	–	–	ns	–	–				
	(Latvia) (17) Maksims Bogdanovs	—	–	–	–	–	–	ns	–				
	(Sweden) (17) Simon Gustafsson	—	–	–	–	–	–	–	ns				
	(Czech Republic) (18) Adrian Rymel	—	ns	–	–	–	–	–	–				
	(Poland) (18) Janusz Kołodziej	—	–	ns	–	–	–	–	–				
	(Sweden) (18) Thomas H. Jonasson	—	–	–	ns	–	–	–	–				
	(Denmark) (18) Nicolai Klindt	—	–	–	–	ns	–	–	–				
	(United Kingdom) (18) Simon Stead	—	–	–	–	–	ns	–	–				
	(Latvia) (18) Vjačeslavs Giruckis	—	–	–	–	–	–	ns	–				
	(Sweden) (18) Ludvig Lindgren	—	–	–	–	–	–	–	ns				
Pos.	Rider	Points	CZE (Czech Republic)	EUR (Poland)	SWE (Sweden)	DEN (Denmark)	GBR (United Kingdom)	LAT (Latvia)	SCA (Sweden)	NOR (Denmark)	SVN (Slovenia)	ITA (Italy)	POL (Poland)

== See also ==
- Speedway Grand Prix
- List of Speedway Grand Prix riders
