= 2009 Speedway Grand Prix of Slovenia =

- 2009 FIM Slovenian Speedway Grand Prix

Information
- Date: 12 September 2009
- City: (Slovenia) Krško
- Event: 9 of 11 (120)
- Referee: (Poland) Wojciech Grodzki
- Jury President: (Germany) Wolfgang Glas

Stadium details
- Stadium: Matija Gubec Stadium (štadion M.G.)
- Capacity: 16,000
- Length: 3,878 m (4,241 yd)

SGP Results
- Best Time
- (gold) Winner: (Russia) Emil Sayfutdinov
- (silver) Runner-up: (Poland) Rune Holta
- (bronze) 3rd place: (Poland) Tomasz Gollob

The 2009 FIM Speedway World Championship Grand Prix of Slovenia will be the ninth race of the 2009 Speedway Grand Prix season. It took place on 12 September in the Matija Gubec Stadium in Krško, Slovenia.

The Slovenian SGP was won by Emil Sayfutdinov, who beat Rune Holta, Tomasz Gollob and Nicki Pedersen in the final. It was third GP Emil's winning.

== Riders ==
The Speedway Grand Prix Commission nominated Matej Žagar as the wild card and Izak Šantej and Aleksander Čonda as the track reserves. The riders' starting positions draw for Grand Prix meeting was made on 11 September at 13:00 CEST by Jury President Wolfgang Glas.

== Heat details ==
Placing	Draw	Rider	Total	1	2	3	4	5	6	7	8	9	10	11	12	13	14	15	16	17	18	19	20	Pts	Pos	21	22	23
1	13	(Russia) (15) Emil Sayfutdinov	24				3	3							3		3					3		15	1	3		3
2	11	(Poland) (8) Rune Holta	19			2				3		2					2						3	12	2		3	2
3	10	(Poland) (3) Tomasz Gollob	12			3			2						1			2		0				8	6	2		1
4	8	(Denmark) (1) Nicki Pedersen	10		0						2			3			1			2				8	5		2	X
5	1	(Australia) (2) Jason Crump	12	3				2				0				3				3				11	3		1
6	6	(Australia) (6) Leigh Adams	9		2				0			3							3			1		9	4	0
7	3	(United States) (4) Greg Hancock	9	2						2				1				3				F2x		8	7	1
8	4	(United Kingdom) (9) Scott Nicholls	7	0							3				2				2				0	7	8		0
9	12	(Denmark) (12) Kenneth Bjerre	7			0					0		3			2						2		7	9
10	14	(Slovenia) (16) Matej Žagar	7				0		3					2		0							2	7	10
11	5	(Poland) (13) Grzegorz Walasek	6		3			1					1					0					1	6	11
12	15	(Sweden) (10) Fredrik Lindgren	6				2			1			2						0	1				6	12
13	9	(Denmark) (5) Hans N. Andersen	5			1		0						F3					1		3			5	13
14	16	(Sweden) (7) Andreas Jonsson	5				1				1	1						1			1			5	14
15	2	(United Kingdom) (11) Chris Harris	4	1					1				F2				0				2			4	15
16	7	(Poland) (14) Sebastian Ułamek	2		1					0					0	1					0			2	16
17	17	(Slovenia) (17) Izak Šantej	-																					-	17
18	18	(Slovenia) (18) Aleksander Čonda	-																					-	18
Placing	Draw	Rider	Total	1	2	3	4	5	6	7	8	9	10	11	12	13	14	15	16	17	18	19	20	Pts	Pos	21	22	23

e: retired or mechanical failure • m: exclusion for exceeding two minute time allowance • t: exclusion for touching the tapes • x: other exclusion • f: fell
ns: non-starter • nc: non-classify
Semi-finals: Heat 21: Riders placed 1st, 4th, 6th & 7th in the intermediate classification (after 20 heats)
Heat 22: Riders placed 2nd, 3rd, 5th & 8th in the intermediate classification (after 20 heats)
Big Final (heat 23): The first and second placed riders in each of the Semi-Finals

gate A – inside	gate B	gate C	gate D – outside

=== Heat after heat ===
1. Crump, Hancock, Harris, Nicholls
2. Walasek, Adams, Ułamek, Pedersen
3. Gollob, Holta, Andersen, Bjerre
4. Sayfutdinov, Lindgren, Jonsson, Žagar
5. Sayfutdinov, Crump, Walasek, Andersen
6. Žagar, Gollob, Harris, Adams
7. Holta, Hancock, Lindgren, Ułamek
8. Nicholls, Pedersen, Jonsson, Bjerre
9. Adams, Holta, Jonsson, Crump
10. Bjerre, Lindgren, Walasek, Harris (F2)
11. Pedersen, Žagar, Hancock, Andersen (F3)
12. Sayfutdinov, Nicholls, Gollob, Ułamek
13. Crump, Bjerre, Ułamek, Žagar
14. Sayfutdinov, Holta, Pedersen, Harris
15. Hancock, Gollob, Jonsson, Walasek
16. Adams, Nicholls, Andersen, Lindgren
17. Crump, Pedersen, Lindgren, Gollob
18. Andersen, Harris, Jonsson, Ułamek
19. Sayfutdinov, Bjerre, Adams, Hancock (F2x)
20. Holta, Žagar, Walasek, Nicholls
  Semi-Finals:
21. Sayfutdinov, Gollob, Hancock, Adams
22. Holta, Pedersen, Crump, Nicholls
  The Final:
23. Sayfutdinov (6 points), Holta (4 points), Gollob (2 points), Pedersen (X)

== The intermediate classification ==
Qualifies for next season's Grand Prix series
Full-time Grand Prix rider
Wild card, track reserve or qualified reserve

Pos.	Rider	Points	CZE (Czech Republic)	EUR (Poland)	SWE (Sweden)	DEN (Denmark)	GBR (United Kingdom)	LAT (Latvia)	SCA (Sweden)	NOR (Denmark)	SVN (Slovenia)	ITA (Italy)	POL (Poland)
1	(Australia) (2) Jason Crump	146	14	22	16	22	24	10	18	8	12		
2	(Russia) (15) Emil Sayfutdinov	120	17	9	20	14	7	10	5	14	24		
3	(Poland) (3) Tomasz Gollob	110	7	17	7	13	9	16	22	7	12		
4	(United States) (4) Greg Hancock	106	10	16	5	14	14	20	8	10	9		
5	(Sweden) (7) Andreas Jonsson	92	11	16	12	7	5	6	10	20	5		
6	(Denmark) (12) Kenneth Bjerre	85	10	5	8	8	7	15	10	15	7		
7	(Sweden) (10) Fredrik Lindgren	82	19	2	9	3	16	6	9	12	6		
8	(Denmark) (1) Nicki Pedersen	80	12	9	13	10	8	–	7	11	10		
9	(Poland) (8) Rune Holta	77	3	8	11	5	7	7	2	15	19		
10	(Denmark) (5) Hans N. Andersen	70	6	6	5	6	15	9	14	4	5		
11	(Australia) (6) Leigh Adams	63	13	6	3	6	3	11	5	7	9		
12	(Poland) (14) Sebastian Ułamek	56	5	8	6	8	8	6	5	8	2		
13	(Poland) (13) Grzegorz Walasek	50	6	5	6	7	1	6	6	7	6		
14	(United Kingdom) (11) Chris Harris	48	6	5	5	5	9	5	8	1	4		
15	(United Kingdom) (9) Scott Nicholls	35	4	1	1	5	6	3	5	3	7		
16	(Sweden) (16) Antonio Lindbäck	27	–	–	17	–	–	–	10	–	–		
17	(Denmark) (16) (19) Niels Kristian Iversen	20	–	–	–	11	–	8	–	1	–		
18	(Poland) (16) Jarosław Hampel	9	–	9	–	–	–	–	–	–	–		
19	(Slovenia) (16) Matej Žagar	7	–	–	–	–	–	–	–	–	7		
20	(Latvia) (16) Grigory Laguta	6	–	–	–	–	–	6	–	–	–		
21	(United Kingdom) (16) Edward Kennett	4	–	–	–	–	4	–	–	–	–		
22	(Czech Republic) (16) Matěj Kůs	1	1	–	–	–	–	–	–	–	–		
Rider(s) not classified
	(Czech Republic) (17) Luboš Tomíček, Jr.	—	ns	–	–	–	–	–	–	–	–		
	(Poland) (17) Damian Baliński	—	–	ns	–	–	–	–	–	–	–		
	(Sweden) (17) Ricky Kling	—	–	–	ns	–	–	–	–	–	–		
	(Denmark) (17) Patrick Hougaard	—	–	–	–	ns	–	–	–	–	–		
	(United Kingdom) (17) Tai Woffinden	—	–	–	–	–	ns	–	–	–	–		
	(Latvia) (17) Maksims Bogdanovs	—	–	–	–	–	–	ns	–	–	–		
	(Sweden) (17) Simon Gustafsson	—	–	–	–	–	–	–	ns	–	–		
	(Denmark) (17) Kenneth Hansen	—	–	–	–	–	–	–	–	ns	–		
	(Slovenia) (17) Izak Šantej	—	–	–	–	–	–	–	–	–	ns		
	(Czech Republic) (18) Adrian Rymel	—	ns	–	–	–	–	–	–	–	–		
	(Poland) (18) Janusz Kołodziej	—	–	ns	–	–	–	–	–	–	–		
	(Sweden) (18) Thomas H. Jonasson	—	–	–	ns	–	–	–	–	–	–		
	(Denmark) (18) Nicolai Klindt	—	–	–	–	ns	–	–	–	–	–		
	(United Kingdom) (18) Simon Stead	—	–	–	–	–	ns	–	–	–	–		
	(Latvia) (18) Vjačeslavs Giruckis	—	–	–	–	–	–	ns	–	–	–		
	(Sweden) (18) Ludvig Lindgren	—	–	–	–	–	–	–	ns	–	–		
	(Denmark) (18) Morten Risager	—	–	–	–	–	–	–	–	ns	–		
	(Slovenia) (18) Aleksander Čonda	—	–	–	–	–	–	–	–	–	ns		
Pos.	Rider	Points	CZE (Czech Republic)	EUR (Poland)	SWE (Sweden)	DEN (Denmark)	GBR (United Kingdom)	LAT (Latvia)	SCA (Sweden)	NOR (Denmark)	SVN (Slovenia)	ITA (Italy)	POL (Poland)

== See also ==
- Speedway Grand Prix
- List of Speedway Grand Prix riders
