= 2009 Speedway Grand Prix of Poland =

Speedway race

- 2009 FIM Bydgoszcz Speedway Grand Prix of Poland

Information
- Date: 17 October 2009
- City: (Poland) Bydgoszcz
- Event: 11 of 11 (122)
- Referee: (United Kingdom) Anthony Steele
- Jury President: (Denmark) Jörgen L. Jensen

Stadium details
- Stadium: Polonia Bydgoszcz Stadium
- Capacity: 25,000
- Length: 348 m (381 yd)

SGP Results
- Attendance: 20,000
- Best Time: (Poland) Tomasz Gollob; 64.94 secs (in Heat 8)
- (gold) Winner: (Denmark) Nicki Pedersen
- (silver) Runner-up: (Australia) Leigh Adams
- (bronze) 3rd place: (Poland) Sebastian Ulamek

The 2009 FIM Speedway World Championship Grand Prix of Poland was the eleventh and a last race of the 2009 Speedway Grand Prix season. It took place on 17 October in the Polonia Stadium in Bydgoszcz, Poland.

The 13th Bydgoszcz Grand Prix was won by Nicki Pedersen who beat Leigh Adams, Sebastian Ułamek and Rune Holta in the final.

== Riders ==
The Speedway Grand Prix Commission nominated Adrian Miedziński as the wild card and Grzegorz Zengota and Krzysztof Buczkowski as the track reserves. The riders' starting positions draw for Grand Prix meeting was made on 16 October at 13:00 CEST by Deputy Mayor of Bydgoszcz Maciej Grześkowiak.

== Heat details ==
Placing	Draw	Rider	Total	1	2	3	4	5	6	7	8	9	10	11	12	13	14	15	16	17	18	19	20	Pts	Pos	21	22	23
1	12	(Denmark) (1) Nicki Pedersen	18			3					1		3			2						1		10	5		2	3
2	8	(Australia) (6) Leigh Adams	15		3						2			2			0			2				9	6	2		2
3	9	(Poland) (14) Sebastian Ułamek	16			0		3						3					2		3			11	1	3		1
4	13	(Poland) (8) Rune Holta	14				3	0							3		3					2		11	2		3	0
5	11	(Sweden) (7) Andreas Jonsson	12			2				3		2					2						2	11	4	1
6	4	(Poland) (3) Tomasz Gollob	11	3							3				1				1				3	11	3		X
7	1	(Australia) (2) Jason Crump	9	2				2				1				3				0				8	8		1
8	15	(Denmark) (12) Kenneth Bjerre	8				1			1			0						3	3				8	7	0
9	5	(United States) (4) Greg Hancock	8		2			1					2					3					0	8	9
10	14	(Russia) (15) Emil Sayfutdinov	7				2		3					1		0							1	7	10
11	7	(Sweden) (10) Fredrik Lindgren	7		F4					2					2	1					2			7	11
12	16	(Poland) (16) Adrian Miedziński	6				0				0	3						2			1			6	12
13	10	(United Kingdom) (9) Scott Nicholls	4			1			1						0			1		1				4	13
14	3	(United Kingdom) (11) Chris Harris	3	0						0				0				0				3		3	14
15	6	(Poland) (13) Grzegorz Walasek	3		1				2			0							0			0		3	15
16	2	(Denmark) (5) Hans N. Andersen	3	1					0				1				1				0			3	16
17	17	(Poland) (17) Grzegorz Zengota	-																					-	17
18	18	(Poland) (18) Krzysztof Buczkowski	-																					-	18
Placing	Draw	Rider	Total	1	2	3	4	5	6	7	8	9	10	11	12	13	14	15	16	17	18	19	20	Pts	Pos	21	22	23

e: retired or mechanical failure • m: exclusion for exceeding two minute time allowance • t: exclusion for touching the tapes • x: other exclusion • f: fell
ns: non-starter • nc: non-classify
Semi-finals: Heat 21: Riders placed 1st, 4th, 6th & 7th in the intermediate classification (after 20 heats)
Heat 22: Riders placed 2nd, 3rd, 5th & 8th in the intermediate classification (after 20 heats)
Big Final (heat 23): The first and second placed riders in each of the Semi-Finals

gate A – inside	gate B	gate C	gate D – outside

=== Heat after heat ===
1. (65,25) Gollob, Crump, Andersen, Harris
2. (65,75 Adams, Hancock, Walasek, Lindgren (F4)
3. (65,37) Pedersen, Jonsson, Nicholls, Ułamek
4. (66,06) Holta, Sayfutdinov, Bjerre, Miedziński
5. (65,05) Ułamek, Crump, Hancock, Holta
6. (65,13) Sayfutdinov, Walasek, Nicholls, Andersen
7. (65,65) Jonsson, Lindgren, Bjerre, Harris
8. (64,94) Gollob, Adams, Pedersen, Miedziński
9. (65,31) Miedziński, Jonsson, Crump, Walasek
10. (65,40) Pedersen, Hancock, Andersen, Bjerre
11. (65,50) Ułamek, Adams, Sayfutdinov, Harris
12. (65,12) Holta, Lindgren, Gollob, Nicholls
13. (65,37) Crump, Pedersen, Sayfutdinov, Lindgren
14. (65,53) Holta, Jonsson, Andersen, Adams
15. (65,35) Hancock, Miedziński, Nicholls, Harris
16. (65,28) Bjerre, Ułamek, Gollob, Walasek
17. (66,31) Bjerre, Adams, Nicholls, Crump
18. (66,69) Ułamek, Lindgren, Miedziński, Andersen
19. (65,71) Harris, Holta, Pedersen, Walasek
20. (64,97) Gollob, Jonsson, Sayfutdinov, Hancock
  Semi-finals:
21. (65,91) Ułamek, Adams, Jonsson, Bjerre
22. (65,60) Holta, Pedersen, Crump, Gollob (X)
  The Final:
23. (65,56) Pedersen (6 points), Adams (4 points), Ułamek (2 points), Holta

== The intermediate classification ==
Qualifies for next season's Grand Prix series
Full-time Grand Prix rider
Wild card, track reserve or qualified reserve

Pos.	Rider	Points	CZE (Czech Republic)	EUR (Poland)	SWE (Sweden)	DEN (Denmark)	GBR (United Kingdom)	LAT (Latvia)	SCA (Sweden)	NOR (Denmark)	SVN (Slovenia)	ITA (Italy)	POL (Poland)
Gold	(Australia) (2) Jason Crump	159	14	22	16	22	24	10	18	8	12	4	9
Silver	(Poland) (3) Tomasz Gollob	144	7	17	7	13	9	16	22	7	12	23	11
Bronze	(Russia) (15) Emil Sayfutdinov	138	17	9	20	14	7	10	5	14	24	11	7
4	(United States) (4) Greg Hancock	121	10	16	5	14	14	20	8	10	9	7	8
5	(Sweden) (7) Andreas Jonsson	116	11	16	12	7	5	6	10	20	5	12	12
6	(Denmark) (1) Nicki Pedersen	110	12	9	13	10	8	–	7	11	10	12	18
7	(Poland) (8) Rune Holta	99	3	8	11	5	7	7	2	15	19	8	14
8	(Denmark) (12) Kenneth Bjerre	98	10	5	8	8	7	15	10	15	7	5	8
9	(Sweden) (10) Fredrik Lindgren	95	19	2	9	3	16	6	9	12	6	6	7
10	(Denmark) (5) Hans N. Andersen	91	6	6	5	6	15	9	14	4	5	18	3
11	(Australia) (6) Leigh Adams	81	13	6	3	6	3	11	5	7	9	3	15
12	(Poland) (14) Sebastian Ułamek	75	5	8	6	8	8	6	5	8	2	3	16
13	(Poland) (13) Grzegorz Walasek	66	6	5	6	7	1	6	6	7	6	13	3
14	(United Kingdom) (11) Chris Harris	62	6	5	5	5	9	5	8	1	4	11	3
15	(United Kingdom) (9) Scott Nicholls	45	4	1	1	5	6	3	5	3	7	6	4
16	(Sweden) (16) Antonio Lindbäck	27	–	–	17	–	–	–	10	–	–	–	–
17	(Denmark) (16) (19) Niels Kristian Iversen	20	–	–	–	11	–	8	–	1	–	–	–
18	(Poland) (16) Jarosław Hampel	9	–	9	–	–	–	–	–	–	–	–	–
19	(Slovenia) (16) Matej Žagar	7	–	–	–	–	–	–	–	–	7	–	–
20	(Latvia) (16) Grigory Laguta	6	–	–	–	–	–	6	–	–	–	–	–
21	(Poland) (16) Adrian Miedziński	6	–	–	–	–	–	–	–	–	–	–	6
22	(United Kingdom) (16) Edward Kennett	4	–	–	–	–	4	–	–	–	–	–	–
23	(Italy) (16) Guglielmo Franchetti	2	–	–	–	–	–	–	–	–	–	2	–
24	(Czech Republic) (16) Matěj Kůs	1	1	–	–	–	–	–	–	–	–	–	–
25	(Italy) (17) Mattia Carpanese	0	–	–	–	–	–	–	–	–	–	0	–
Rider(s) not classified
	(Czech Republic) (17) Luboš Tomíček, Jr.	—	ns	–	–	–	–	–	–	–	–	–	–
	(Poland) (17) Damian Baliński	—	–	ns	–	–	–	–	–	–	–	–	–
	(Sweden) (17) Ricky Kling	—	–	–	ns	–	–	–	–	–	–	–	–
	(Denmark) (17) Patrick Hougaard	—	–	–	–	ns	–	–	–	–	–	–	–
	(United Kingdom) (17) Tai Woffinden	—	–	–	–	–	ns	–	–	–	–	–	–
	(Latvia) (17) Maksims Bogdanovs	—	–	–	–	–	–	ns	–	–	–	–	–
	(Sweden) (17) Simon Gustafsson	—	–	–	–	–	–	–	ns	–	–	–	–
	(Denmark) (17) Kenneth Hansen	—	–	–	–	–	–	–	–	ns	–	–	–
	(Slovenia) (17) Izak Šantej	—	–	–	–	–	–	–	–	–	ns	–	–
	(Poland) (17) Grzegorz Zengota	—	–	–	–	–	–	–	–	–	–	–	ns
	(Czech Republic) (18) Adrian Rymel	—	ns	–	–	–	–	–	–	–	–	–	–
	(Poland) (18) Janusz Kołodziej	—	–	ns	–	–	–	–	–	–	–	–	–
	(Sweden) (18) Thomas H. Jonasson	—	–	–	ns	–	–	–	–	–	–	–	–
	(Denmark) (18) Nicolai Klindt	—	–	–	–	ns	–	–	–	–	–	–	–
	(United Kingdom) (18) Simon Stead	—	–	–	–	–	ns	–	–	–	–	–	–
	(Latvia) (18) Vjačeslavs Giruckis	—	–	–	–	–	–	ns	–	–	–	–	–
	(Sweden) (18) Ludvig Lindgren	—	–	–	–	–	–	–	ns	–	–	–	–
	(Denmark) (18) Morten Risager	—	–	–	–	–	–	–	–	ns	–	–	–
	(Slovenia) (18) Aleksander Čonda	—	–	–	–	–	–	–	–	–	ns	–	–
	(Italy) (18) Andrea Maida	—	–	–	–	–	–	–	–	–	–	ns	–
	(Poland) (18) Krzysztof Buczkowski	—	–	–	–	–	–	–	–	–	–	–	ns
Pos.	Rider	Points	CZE (Czech Republic)	EUR (Poland)	SWE (Sweden)	DEN (Denmark)	GBR (United Kingdom)	LAT (Latvia)	SCA (Sweden)	NOR (Denmark)	SVN (Slovenia)	ITA (Italy)	POL (Poland)

== See also ==
- Speedway Grand Prix
- List of Speedway Grand Prix riders
