= 2009 Speedway Grand Prix of Nordic =

(Denmark) 2009 Speedway Grand Prix of Nordic
- 2009 FIM Dansk Metal Nordic Speedway Grand Prix

Information
- Date: 29 August 2009
- City: (Denmark) Vojens
- Event: 8 of 11 (119)
- Referee: (United Kingdom) Anthony Steele
- Jury President: (Sweden) Christer Bergström

Stadium details
- Stadium: Vojens Speedway Center
- Capacity: 22,000
- Length: 300 m (330 yd)

SGP Results
- Best Time
- (gold) Winner: (Sweden) Andreas Jonsson
- (silver) Runner-up: (Poland) Rune Holta
- (bronze) 3rd place: (Denmark) Kenneth Bjerre

The 2009 FIM Speedway World Championship Grand Prix of Nordic will be the eighth race of the 2009 Speedway Grand Prix season. It took place on 29 August in the Vojens Speedway Center in Vojens, Denmark. Vojens was GP host between 1995 and 2002.

The first Nordic SGP was won by Andreas Jonsson, who beat Rune Holta, Kenneth Bjerre and Emil Sayfutdinov in the final.

== Riders ==
The Speedway Grand Prix Commission nominated Niels Kristian Iversen as the wild card and Kenneth Hansen and Morten Risager as the track reserves. On 26 August in Danish league match between Esbjerg and Slangerup SK Kenneth Hansen feel on track and was hospitalize. The riders' starting positions draw for Grand Prix meeting was made on 28 August at 13:00 CEST by FIM Jury President Christer Bergström.

== Heat details ==
Placing	Draw	Rider	Total	1	2	3	4	5	6	7	8	9	10	11	12	13	14	15	16	17	18	19	20	Pts	Pos	21	22	23
1	5	(Sweden) (7) Andreas Jonsson	20		2			3					2					3					1	11	3		3	3
2	10	(Poland) (8) Rune Holta	15			2			1						3			1		2				9	7	2		2
3	14	(Denmark) (12) Kenneth Bjerre	15				3		3					2		1							2	11	2		2	1
4	12	(Russia) (15) Emil Sayfutdinov	14			3					2		3			2						1		11	1	3		X
5	13	(Sweden) (10) Fredrik Lindgren	12				2	2							2		2					3		11	4	1
6	8	(Denmark) (1) Nicki Pedersen	11		3						Fx			1			3			3				10	5		1
7	7	(United States) (4) Greg Hancock	10		1					3					X	3					3			10	6	0
8	9	(Poland) (14) Sebastian Ułamek	8			0		1						3					2		2			8	8		0
9	2	(Australia) (2) Jason Crump	8	3					2				1				1				1			8	9
10	16	(Australia) (6) Leigh Adams	7				1				3	3						0			0			7	10
11	4	(Poland) (3) Tomasz Gollob	7	0							1				F2x				3				3	7	11
12	3	(Poland) (13) Grzegorz Walasek	7	2						1				0				2				2		7	12
13	15	(Denmark) (5) Hans N. Andersen	4				0			2			0						1	1				4	13
14	11	(United Kingdom) (9) Scott Nicholls	3			1				0		2					0						0	3	14
15	6	(United Kingdom) (11) Chris Harris	1		0				0			1							0			0		1	15
16	1	(Denmark) (16) Niels Kristian Iversen	1	1				0				F4				0				0				1	16
17	17	(Denmark) (17) Kenneth Hansen	-																					-	17
18	18	(Denmark) (18) Morten Risager	-																					-	18
Placing	Draw	Rider	Total	1	2	3	4	5	6	7	8	9	10	11	12	13	14	15	16	17	18	19	20	Pts	Pos	21	22	23

e: retired or mechanical failure • m: exclusion for exceeding two minute time allowance • t: exclusion for touching the tapes • x: other exclusion • f: fell
ns: non-starter • nc: non-classify
Semi-finals: Heat 21: Riders placed 1st, 4th, 6th & 7th in the intermediate classification (after 20 heats)
Heat 22: Riders placed 2nd, 3rd, 5th & 8th in the intermediate classification (after 20 heats)
Big Final (heat 23): The first and second placed riders in each of the Semi-Finals

gate A – inside	gate B	gate C	gate D – outside

=== Heat after heat ===
1. Crump, Walasek, Iversen, Gollob
2. Pedersen, Jonsson, Hancock, Harris
3. Sajfutdinov, Holta, Nicholls, Ułamek
4. Bjerre, Lindgren, Adams, Andersen
5. Jonsson, Lindgren, Ułamek, Iversen
6. Bjerre, Crump, Holta, Harris
7. Hancock, Andersen, Walasek, Nicholls
8. Adams, Sajfutdinov, Gollob, Pedersen (Fx)
9. Adams, Nicholls, Harris, Iversen
10. Sajfutdinov, Jonsson, Crump, Andersen
11. Ułamek, Bjerre, Pedersen, Walasek
12. Holta, Lindgren, Gollob (F2x), Hancock (X)
13. Hancock, Sajfutdinov, Bjerre, Iversen
14. Pedersen, Lindgren, Crump, Nicholls
15. Jonsson, Walasek, Holta, Adams
16. Gollob, Ułamek, Andersen, Harris
17. Pedersen, Holta, Andersen, Iversen
18. Hancock, Ułamek, Crump, Adams
19. Lindgren, Walasek, Sajfutdinov, Harris
20. Gollob, Bjerre, Jonsson, Nicholls
  Semi-Finals:
21. Sajfutdinov, Holta, Lindgren, Hancock
22. Jonsson, Bjerre, Pedrsen, Ułamek
  The Final:
23. Jonsson (6 pts), Holta (4 pts), Bjerre (2 pts), Sajfutdinov (0 pts - X)

== The intermediate classification ==
Qualifies for next season's Grand Prix series
Full-time Grand Prix rider
Wild card, track reserve or qualified reserve

Pos.	Rider	Points	CZE (Czech Republic)	EUR (Poland)	SWE (Sweden)	DEN (Denmark)	GBR (United Kingdom)	LAT (Latvia)	SCA (Sweden)	NOR (Denmark)	SVN (Slovenia)	ITA (Italy)	POL (Poland)
1	(Australia) (2) Jason Crump	134	14	22	16	22	24	10	18	8			
2	(Poland) (3) Tomasz Gollob	98	7	17	7	13	9	16	22	7			
3	(United States) (4) Greg Hancock	97	10	16	5	14	14	20	8	10			
4	(Russia) (15) Emil Sayfutdinov	96	17	9	20	14	7	10	5	14			
5	(Sweden) (7) Andreas Jonsson	87	11	16	12	7	5	6	10	20			
6	(Denmark) (12) Kenneth Bjerre	78	10	5	8	8	7	15	10	15			
7	(Sweden) (10) Fredrik Lindgren	76	19	2	9	3	16	6	9	12			
8	(Denmark) (1) Nicki Pedersen	70	12	9	13	10	8	–	7	11			
9	(Denmark) (5) Hans N. Andersen	65	6	6	5	6	15	9	14	4			
10	(Poland) (8) Rune Holta	58	3	8	11	5	7	7	2	15			
11	(Australia) (6) Leigh Adams	54	13	6	3	6	3	11	5	7			
12	(Poland) (14) Sebastian Ułamek	54	5	8	6	8	8	6	5	8			
13	(United Kingdom) (11) Chris Harris	44	6	5	5	5	9	5	8	1			
14	(Poland) (13) Grzegorz Walasek	44	6	5	6	7	1	6	6	7			
15	(United Kingdom) (9) Scott Nicholls	28	4	1	1	5	6	3	5	3			
16	(Sweden) (16) Antonio Lindbäck	27	–	–	17	–	–	–	10	–			
17	(Denmark) (16) (19) Niels Kristian Iversen	20	–	–	–	11	–	8	–	1			
18	(Poland) (16) Jarosław Hampel	9	–	9	–	–	–	–	–	–			
19	(Latvia) (16) Grigory Laguta	6	–	–	–	–	–	6	–	–			
20	(United Kingdom) (16) Edward Kennett	4	–	–	–	–	4	–	–	–			
21	(Czech Republic) (16) Matěj Kůs	1	1	–	–	–	–	–	–	–			
Rider(s) not classified
	(Czech Republic) (17) Luboš Tomíček, Jr.	—	ns	–	–	–	–	–	–	–			
	(Poland) (17) Damian Baliński	—	–	ns	–	–	–	–	–	–			
	(Sweden) (17) Ricky Kling	—	–	–	ns	–	–	–	–	–			
	(Denmark) (17) Patrick Hougaard	—	–	–	–	ns	–	–	–	–			
	(United Kingdom) (17) Tai Woffinden	—	–	–	–	–	ns	–	–	–			
	(Latvia) (17) Maksims Bogdanovs	—	–	–	–	–	–	ns	–	–			
	(Sweden) (17) Simon Gustafsson	—	–	–	–	–	–	–	ns	–			
	(Denmark) (17) Kenneth Hansen	—	–	–	–	–	–	–	–	ns			
	(Czech Republic) (18) Adrian Rymel	—	ns	–	–	–	–	–	–	–			
	(Poland) (18) Janusz Kołodziej	—	–	ns	–	–	–	–	–	–			
	(Sweden) (18) Thomas H. Jonasson	—	–	–	ns	–	–	–	–	–			
	(Denmark) (18) Nicolai Klindt	—	–	–	–	ns	–	–	–	–			
	(United Kingdom) (18) Simon Stead	—	–	–	–	–	ns	–	–	–			
	(Latvia) (18) Vjačeslavs Giruckis	—	–	–	–	–	–	ns	–	–			
	(Sweden) (18) Ludvig Lindgren	—	–	–	–	–	–	–	ns	–			
	(Denmark) (18) Morten Risager	—	–	–	–	–	–	–	–	ns			
Pos.	Rider	Points	CZE (Czech Republic)	EUR (Poland)	SWE (Sweden)	DEN (Denmark)	GBR (United Kingdom)	LAT (Latvia)	SCA (Sweden)	NOR (Denmark)	SVN (Slovenia)	ITA (Italy)	POL (Poland)

== See also ==
- Speedway Grand Prix
- List of Speedway Grand Prix riders
