= 2009 Speedway Grand Prix of Italy =

- 2009 FIM Italian Speedway Grand Prix

Information
- Date: 26 September 2009
- City: (Italy) Terenzano
- Event: 10 of 11 (121)
- Referee: (Sweden) Krister Gardell
- Jury President: (Denmark) Jörgen L. Jensen

Stadium details
- Stadium: Pista Olimpia Terenzano
- Capacity: 4,000
- Length: 400 m (440 yd)

SGP Results
- Best Time
- (gold) Winner: (Poland) Tomasz Gollob
- (silver) Runner-up: (Denmark) Hans N. Andersen
- (bronze) 3rd place: (Denmark) Nicki Pedersen

The 2009 FIM Speedway World Championship Grand Prix of Italy will be the tenth race of the 2009 Speedway Grand Prix season. It took place on 26 September in the Pista Olimpia Terenzano in Terenzano, Italy. It will be first Speedway Grand Prix (SGP) event held in Terenzano; previous Italian SGP events had always taken place in Lonigo.

The first Grand Prix in Terensano was won by Pole Tomasz Gollob who beat Hans N. Andersen, Nicki Pedersen and Grzegorz Walasek in the final.

== Riders ==
The Speedway Grand Prix Commission nominated Guglielmo Franchetti as the wild card and Mattia Carpanese and Andrea Maida as the track reserves. The riders' starting positions draw for Grand Prix meeting was made on 25 September at 13:00 CEST by Mayor of Terenzano.

== Heat details ==
Placing	Draw	Rider	Total	1	2	3	4	5	6	7	8	9	10	11	12	13	14	15	16	17	18	19	20	Pts	Pos	21	22	23
1	7	(Poland) (3) Tomasz Gollob	23		3					3					3	3					2			14	1	3		3
2	11	(Denmark) (5) Hans N. Andersen	18			3				1		3					3						2	12	2		2	2
3	15	(Denmark) (1) Nicki Pedersen	12				2			0			0						3	2				7	8		3	1
4	8	(Poland) (13) Grzegorz Walasek	13		1						2			3			2			3				11	4	2		0
5	3	(Sweden) (7) Andreas Jonsson	12	2						2				1				3				3		11	5		1
6	16	(Russia) (15) Emil Sayfutdinov	11				3				3	1						1			3			11	3		0
7	1	(United Kingdom) (11) Chris Harris	11	3				2				2				2				1				10	6	1
8	9	(Poland) (8) Rune Holta	8			0		3						2					2		1			8	7	0
9	12	(United States) (4) Greg Hancock	7			1					1		3			0						2		7	9
10	4	(United Kingdom) (9) Scott Nicholls	6	1							0				1				1				3	6	10
11	5	(Sweden) (10) Fredrik Lindgren	6		2			0					2					2					0	6	11
12	14	(Denmark) (12) Kenneth Bjerre	5				R3		3					0		1							1	5	12
13	10	(Australia) (2) Jason Crump	4			2			0						2			0		0				4	13
14	2	(Australia) (6) Leigh Adams	3	0					2				1				0				0			3	14
15	13	(Poland) (14) Sebastian Ułamek	3				1	1							0		1					0		3	15
16	6	(Italy) (16) Guglielmo Franchetti	2		M/-				1			0							0			1		2	16
17	17	(Italy) (17) Mattia Carpanese	0		0																			0	17
18	18	(Italy) (18) Andrea Maida	-																					-	18
Placing	Draw	Rider	Total	1	2	3	4	5	6	7	8	9	10	11	12	13	14	15	16	17	18	19	20	Pts	Pos	21	22	23

e: retired or mechanical failure • m: exclusion for exceeding two minute time allowance • t: exclusion for touching the tapes • x: other exclusion • f: fell
ns: non-starter • nc: non-classify
Semi-finals: Heat 21: Riders placed 1st, 4th, 6th & 7th in the intermediate classification (after 20 heats)
Heat 22: Riders placed 2nd, 3rd, 5th & 8th in the intermediate classification (after 20 heats)
Big Final (heat 23): The first and second placed riders in each of the Semi-Finals

gate A – inside	gate B	gate C	gate D – outside

=== Heat after heat ===
1. Harris, Jonsson, Nicholls, Adams
2. Gollob, Lindgren, Walasek, Carpanese (Franchetti – M/-)
  Franchetti fails to meet the 2 minute warning and is replaced by reserve rider Carpanese.
3. Andersen, Crump, Hancock, Holta
4. Sayfutdinov, Pedersen, Ułamek, Bjerre (R3)
5. Holta, Harris, Ułamek, Lindgren
6. Bjerre, Adams, Franchetti, Crump
7. Gollob, Jonsson, Andersen, Pedersen
8. Sayfutdinov, Walasek, Hancock, Nicholls
9. Andersen, Harris, Sayfutdinov, Franchetti
10. Hancock, Lindgren, Adams, Pedersen
11. Walasek, Holta, Jonsson, Bjerre
12. Gollob, Crump, Nicholls, Ułamek
13. Gollob, Harris, Bjerre, Hancock
14. Andersen, Walasek, Ułamek, Adams
15. Jonsson, Lindgren, Sayfutdinov, Crump
16. Pedersen, Holta, Nicholls, Franchetti
17. Walasek, Pedersen, Harris, Crump
18. Sayfutdinov, Gollob, Holta, Adams
19. Jonsson, Hancock, Franchetti, Ułamek
20. Nicholls, Andersen, Bjerre, Lindgren
  Semi-finals:
21. Gollob, Walasek, Harris, Holta
22. Pedersen, Andersen, Jonsson, Sayfutdinov
  The Final:
23. Gollob (6 pts), Andersen (4 pts), Pedersen (2 pts), Walasek

== The intermediate classification ==
Qualifies for next season's Grand Prix series
Full-time Grand Prix rider
Wild card, track reserve or qualified reserve

Pos.	Rider	Points	CZE (Czech Republic)	EUR (Poland)	SWE (Sweden)	DEN (Denmark)	GBR (United Kingdom)	LAT (Latvia)	SCA (Sweden)	NOR (Denmark)	SVN (Slovenia)	ITA (Italy)	POL (Poland)
1	(Australia) (2) Jason Crump	150	14	22	16	22	24	10	18	8	12	4	
2	(Poland) (3) Tomasz Gollob	133	7	17	7	13	9	16	22	7	12	23	
3	(Russia) (15) Emil Sayfutdinov	131	17	9	20	14	7	10	5	14	24	11	
4	(United States) (4) Greg Hancock	113	10	16	5	14	14	20	8	10	9	7	
5	(Sweden) (7) Andreas Jonsson	104	11	16	12	7	5	6	10	20	5	12	
6	(Denmark) (1) Nicki Pedersen	92	12	9	13	10	8	–	7	11	10	12	
7	(Denmark) (12) Kenneth Bjerre	90	10	5	8	8	7	15	10	15	7	5	
8	(Denmark) (5) Hans N. Andersen	88	6	6	5	6	15	9	14	4	5	18	
9	(Sweden) (10) Fredrik Lindgren	88	19	2	9	3	16	6	9	12	6	6	
10	(Poland) (8) Rune Holta	85	3	8	11	5	7	7	2	15	19	8	
11	(Australia) (6) Leigh Adams	66	13	6	3	6	3	11	5	7	9	3	
12	(Poland) (13) Grzegorz Walasek	63	6	5	6	7	1	6	6	7	6	13	
13	(United Kingdom) (11) Chris Harris	59	6	5	5	5	9	5	8	1	4	11	
14	(Poland) (14) Sebastian Ułamek	59	5	8	6	8	8	6	5	8	2	3	
15	(United Kingdom) (9) Scott Nicholls	41	4	1	1	5	6	3	5	3	7	6	
16	(Sweden) (16) Antonio Lindbäck	27	–	–	17	–	–	–	10	–	–	–	
17	(Denmark) (16) (19) Niels Kristian Iversen	20	–	–	–	11	–	8	–	1	–	–	
18	(Poland) (16) Jarosław Hampel	9	–	9	–	–	–	–	–	–	–	–	
19	(Slovenia) (16) Matej Žagar	7	–	–	–	–	–	–	–	–	7	–	
20	(Latvia) (16) Grigory Laguta	6	–	–	–	–	–	6	–	–	–	–	
21	(United Kingdom) (16) Edward Kennett	4	–	–	–	–	4	–	–	–	–	–	
22	(Italy) (16) Guglielmo Franchetti	2	–	–	–	–	–	–	–	–	–	2	
23	(Czech Republic) (16) Matěj Kůs	1	1	–	–	–	–	–	–	–	–	–	
24	(Italy) (17) Mattia Carpanese	0	–	–	–	–	–	–	–	–	–	0	
Rider(s) not classified
	(Czech Republic) (17) Luboš Tomíček, Jr.	—	ns	–	–	–	–	–	–	–	–	–	
	(Poland) (17) Damian Baliński	—	–	ns	–	–	–	–	–	–	–	–	
	(Sweden) (17) Ricky Kling	—	–	–	ns	–	–	–	–	–	–	–	
	(Denmark) (17) Patrick Hougaard	—	–	–	–	ns	–	–	–	–	–	–	
	(United Kingdom) (17) Tai Woffinden	—	–	–	–	–	ns	–	–	–	–	–	
	(Latvia) (17) Maksims Bogdanovs	—	–	–	–	–	–	ns	–	–	–	–	
	(Sweden) (17) Simon Gustafsson	—	–	–	–	–	–	–	ns	–	–	–	
	(Denmark) (17) Kenneth Hansen	—	–	–	–	–	–	–	–	ns	–	–	
	(Slovenia) (17) Izak Šantej	—	–	–	–	–	–	–	–	–	ns	–	
	(Czech Republic) (18) Adrian Rymel	—	ns	–	–	–	–	–	–	–	–	–	
	(Poland) (18) Janusz Kołodziej	—	–	ns	–	–	–	–	–	–	–	–	
	(Sweden) (18) Thomas H. Jonasson	—	–	–	ns	–	–	–	–	–	–	–	
	(Denmark) (18) Nicolai Klindt	—	–	–	–	ns	–	–	–	–	–	–	
	(United Kingdom) (18) Simon Stead	—	–	–	–	–	ns	–	–	–	–	–	
	(Latvia) (18) Vjačeslavs Giruckis	—	–	–	–	–	–	ns	–	–	–	–	
	(Sweden) (18) Ludvig Lindgren	—	–	–	–	–	–	–	ns	–	–	–	
	(Denmark) (18) Morten Risager	—	–	–	–	–	–	–	–	ns	–	–	
	(Slovenia) (18) Aleksander Čonda	—	–	–	–	–	–	–	–	–	ns	–	
	(Italy) (18) Andrea Maida	—	–	–	–	–	–	–	–	–	–	ns	
Pos.	Rider	Points	CZE (Czech Republic)	EUR (Poland)	SWE (Sweden)	DEN (Denmark)	GBR (United Kingdom)	LAT (Latvia)	SCA (Sweden)	NOR (Denmark)	SVN (Slovenia)	ITA (Italy)	POL (Poland)

== See also ==
- Speedway Grand Prix
- List of Speedway Grand Prix riders
