= 2009 Speedway Grand Prix of Europe =

(Poland) 2009 Speedway Grand Prix of Europe
- 2009 FIM otoMoto.pl European Speedway Grand Prix

Information
- Date: 9 May 2009
- City: (Poland) Leszno
- Event: 2 of 11 (113)
- Referee: (Hungary) Darago Istvan
- Jury President: (Finland) Ilka Teromaa

Stadium details
- Stadium: Alfred Smoczyk Stadium
- Capacity: 15,000
- Length: 330 m (360 yd)
- Track: speedway track

SGP Results
- Best Time: (United States) Greg Hancock; 61.06 secs (in Heat 6)
- (gold) Winner: (Australia) Jason Crump
- (silver) Runner-up: (Poland) Tomasz Gollob
- (bronze) 3rd place: (Sweden) Andreas Jonsson

The 2009 FIM Speedway European World Championship Grand Prix was the second race of the 2009 Speedway Grand Prix season. It took place on 9 May 2009, in the Alfred Smoczyk Stadium in Leszno, Poland.

On 9 May European Union celebrates Europe day, commemorating the Schuman declaration. The main sponsor was the Polish website otoMoto.pl.

The European SGP was won by Australian rider Jason Crump.

== Riders ==
The Speedway Grand Prix Commission nominated Jarosław Hampel as the wild card for the Grand Prix. Damian Baliński and Janusz Kołodziej were nominated as the track reserves. The riders' starting positions draw for Grand Prix meeting was made on 8 May at 13:00 CET by President (=Mayor) of Leszno Tomasz Malepszy.

== Heat details ==
Placing	Draw	Rider	Total	1	2	3	4	5	6	7	8	9	10	11	12	13	14	15	16	17	18	19	20	Pts	Pos	21	22	23
1	15	(Australia) (2) Jason Crump	22				2			3			3						2	3				13	2		3	3
2	11	(Poland) (3) Tomasz Gollob	17			3				E2		2					3						3	11	4	2		2
3	13	(Sweden) (7) Andreas Jonsson	16				1	3							3		2					3		12	3		2	1
4	14	(United States) (4) Greg Hancock	16				3		3					3		2							2	13	1	3		0
5	6	(Poland) (16) Jarosław Hampel	9		3				1			0							3			1		8	7	1
6	10	(Russia) (15) Emil Sayfutdinov	9			0			2						2			3		2				9	5		0
7	3	(Denmark) (1) Nicki Pedersen	9	3						2				1				Fx				2		8	8		1
8	12	(Poland) (14) Sebastian Ułamek	8			2					3		0			3						0		8	6	0
9	7	(Poland) (8) Rune Holta	8		2					1					1	1					3			8	9
10	1	(Australia) (6) Leigh Adams	6	2				1				3				0				X				6	10
11	2	(Denmark) (5) Hans N. Andersen	6	1					0				2				1				2			6	11
12	8	(Denmark) (12) Kenneth Bjerre	5		0						2			2			0			1				5	12
13	16	(Poland) (13) Grzegorz Walasek	5				0				1	1						2			1			5	13
14	5	(United Kingdom) (11) Chris Harris	5		1			2					1					1					0	5	14
15	9	(Sweden) (10) Fredrik Lindgren	2			1		0						0					1		0			2	15
16	4	(United Kingdom) (9) Scott Nicholls	1	0							0				0				0				1	1	16
17	17	(Poland) (17) Damian Baliński	-																					-	17
18	18	(Poland) (18) Janusz Kołodziej	-																					-	18
Placing	Draw	Rider	Total	1	2	3	4	5	6	7	8	9	10	11	12	13	14	15	16	17	18	19	20	Pts	Pos	21	22	23

e: retired or mechanical failure • m: exclusion for exceeding two minute time allowance • t: exclusion for touching the tapes • x: other exclusion • f: fell
ns: non-starter • nc: non-classify
Semi-finals: Heat 21: Riders placed 1st, 4th, 6th & 7th in the intermediate classification (after 20 heats)
Heat 22: Riders placed 2nd, 3rd, 5th & 8th in the intermediate classification (after 20 heats)
Big Final (heat 23): The first and second placed riders in each of the Semi-Finals

gate A – inside	gate B	gate C	gate D – outside

=== Heat after heat ===
1. (61.69) Pedersen, Adams, Andersen, Nicholls
2. (61.53) Hampel, Holta, Harris, Bjerre
3. (61.97) Gollob, Ułamek, Lindgren, Sayfutdinov
4. (61.32) Hancock, Crump, Jonsson, Walasek
5. (61.87) Jonsson, Harris, Adams, Lindgren
6. (61.06) Hancock, Sayfutdinov, Hampel, Andersen
7. (61.08) Crump, Pedersen, Holta, Gollob (e)
8. (61.60) Ułamek, Bjerre, Walasek, Nicholls
9. (62.12) Adams, Gollob, Walasek, Hampel
10. (61.28) Crump, Andersen, Harris, Ułamek
11. (61.44) Hancock, Bjerre, Pedersen, Lindgren
12. (61.38) Jonsson, Sayfutdinov, Holta, Nicholls
13. (61.75) Ułamek, Hancock, Holta, Adams
14. (61.78) Gollob, Jonsson, Andersen, Bjerre
15. (61.56) Sayfutdinov, Walasek, Harris, Pedersen (Fx)
  Sayfutdinov falls on 1st lap. Pedersen excluded.
16. (61.53) Hampel, Crump, Lindgren, Nicholls
17. (61.30) Crump, Sayfutdinov, Bjerre, Adams (X)
  Adams and Bjerre crash - Adams excluded.
18. (61.74) Holta, Andersen, Walasek, Lindgren
19. (61.89) Jonsson, Pedersen, Hampel, Ułamek
20. (61.74) Gollob, Hancock, Nicholls, Harris
  Semi-Finals:
21. (61.78) Hancock, Gollob, Hampel, Ułamek
22. (61.22) Crump, Jonsson, Pedersen, Sayfutdinov
  The Final:
23. (61.68) Crump (6 pts), Gollob (4 pts), Jonsson (2 pts), Hancock (0 pts)

== The intermediate classification ==
Qualifies for next season's Grand Prix series
Full-time Grand Prix rider
Wild card, track reserve or qualified reserve

Pos.	Rider	Points	CZE (Czech Republic)	EUR (Poland)	SWE (Sweden)	DEN (Denmark)	GBR (United Kingdom)	LAT (Latvia)	SCA (Sweden)	NOR (Denmark)	SVN (Slovenia)	ITA (Italy)	POL (Poland)
1	(Australia) (2) Jason Crump	36	14	22									
2	(Sweden) (7) Andreas Jonsson	27	11	16									
3	(United States) (4) Greg Hancock	26	10	16									
4	(Russia) (15) Emil Sayfutdinov	26	17	9									
5	(Poland) (3) Tomasz Gollob	24	7	17									
6	(Denmark) (1) Nicki Pedersen	21	12	9									
7	(Sweden) (10) Fredrik Lindgren	21	19	2									
8	(Australia) (6) Leigh Adams	19	13	6									
9	(Denmark) (12) Kenneth Bjerre	15	10	5									
10	(Poland) (14) Sebastian Ułamek	13	5	8									
11	(Denmark) (5) Hans N. Andersen	12	6	6									
12	(Poland) (8) Rune Holta	11	3	8									
13	(United Kingdom) (11) Chris Harris	11	6	5									
14	(Poland) (13) Grzegorz Walasek	11	6	5									
15	(Poland) (16) Jarosław Hampel	9	–	9									
16	(United Kingdom) (9) Scott Nicholls	5	4	1									
17	(Czech Republic) (16) Matěj Kůs	1	1	–									
Rider(s) not classified
	(Czech Republic) (17) Luboš Tomíček, Jr.	—	ns	–									
	(Poland) (17) Damian Baliński	—	–	ns									
	(Czech Republic) (18) Adrian Rymel	—	ns	–									
	(Poland) (18) Janusz Kołodziej	—	–	ns									
Pos.	Rider	Points	CZE (Czech Republic)	EUR (Poland)	SWE (Sweden)	DEN (Denmark)	GBR (United Kingdom)	LAT (Latvia)	SCA (Sweden)	NOR (Denmark)	SVN (Slovenia)	ITA (Italy)	POL (Poland)

== See also ==
- Speedway Grand Prix
- List of Speedway Grand Prix riders
