= 2009 Speedway Grand Prix of Sweden =

- 2009 FIM Meridian Lifts Swedish Speedway Grand Prix

Information
- Date: 30 May 2009
- City: (Sweden) Gothenburg
- Event: 3 of 11 (114)
- Referee: (Poland) Wojciech Grodzki
- Jury President: (Germany) Wolfgang Glas

Stadium details
- Stadium: Ullevi
- Capacity: 43,000
- Length: 400 m (440 yd)
- Track: temporary

SGP Results
- Best Time: (Poland) Rune Holta (Australia) Jason Crump; 69.4 secs (in Heat 4 and 7)
- (gold) Winner: (Russia) Emil Sayfutdinov
- (silver) Runner-up: (Australia) Jason Crump
- (bronze) 3rd place: (Sweden) Antonio Lindback

The 2009 FIM Speedway World Championship Grand Prix of Sweden will be the third race of the 2009 Speedway Grand Prix season. It took place on 30 May 2009, in the Ullevi Stadium in Gothenburg, Sweden.

The Swedish Grand Prix was won by Russian junior Emil Sayfutdinov who beat in the final Australian Jason Crump and Swedish wild card Antonio Lindbäck. It was second Sayfutdinov' winning in his third Grand Prix.

== Riders ==
The Speedway Grand Prix Commission nominated Antonio Lindbäck as the wild card and Ricky Kling and Simon Gustafsson as the first and second track reserves. However, Gustafsson suffered a broken collar bone when he crashed during a Swedish league match on 5 May, and his replacement will be Thomas H. Jonasson. The riders' starting positions draw for Grand Prix meeting was made on 29 May at 13:00 CET.

- Draw Nr 18 change: (Sweden) (18) Simon Gustafsson → (Sweden) (18) Thomas H. Jonasson

== Heat details ==
Placing	Draw	Rider	Total	1	2	3	4	5	6	7	8	9	10	11	12	13	14	15	16	17	18	19	20	Pts	Pos	21	22	23
1	4	(Russia) (15) Emil Sayfutdinov	20	0							2				3				3				3	11	2		3	3
2	3	(Australia) (2) Jason Crump	16	2						3				1				2				2		10	6	2		2
3	9	(Sweden) (16) Antonio Lindbäck	17			2		2						3					2		3			12	1	3		1
4	12	(Denmark) (1) Nicki Pedersen	13			3					3		1			1						3		11	3		2	X
5	10	(Sweden) (7) Andreas Jonsson	12			1			3						2			3		2				11	4	1
6	13	(Poland) (8) Rune Holta	11				3	3							1		2					1		10	5		1
7	15	(Sweden) (10) Fredrik Lindgren	9				2			1			2						1	3				9	7	F3x
8	8	(Denmark) (12) Kenneth Bjerre	8		2						0			2			3			1				8	8		0
9	11	(Poland) (3) Tomasz Gollob	7			0				2		3					0						2	7	9
10	5	(Poland) (14) Sebastian Ułamek	6		3			1					0					1					1	6	10
11	16	(Poland) (13) Grzegorz Walasek	6				1				1	2						0			2			6	11
12	1	(United Kingdom) (11) Chris Harris	5	3				0				0				2				0				5	12
13	14	(Denmark) (5) Hans N. Andersen	5				0		2					0		3							Fx	5	13
14	2	(United States) (4) Greg Hancock	5	1					F2x				3				1				E1			5	14
15	6	(Australia) (6) Leigh Adams	3		1				1			1							0			0		3	15
16	7	(United Kingdom) (9) Scott Nicholls	1		0					0					0	0					1			1	16
17	17	(Sweden) (17) Ricky Kling	-																					-	17
18	18	(Sweden) (18) Thomas H. Jonasson	-																					-	18
Placing	Draw	Rider	Total	1	2	3	4	5	6	7	8	9	10	11	12	13	14	15	16	17	18	19	20	Pts	Pos	21	22	23

e: retired or mechanical failure • m: exclusion for exceeding two minute time allowance • t: exclusion for touching the tapes • x: other exclusion • f: fell
ns: non-starter • nc: non-classify
Semi-finals: Heat 21: Riders placed 1st, 4th, 6th & 7th in the intermediate classification (after 20 heats)
Heat 22: Riders placed 2nd, 3rd, 5th & 8th in the intermediate classification (after 20 heats)
Big Final (heat 23): The first and second placed riders in each of the Semi-Finals

gate A – inside	gate B	gate C	gate D – outside

=== Heat after heat ===
1. (70.9) Harris, Crump, Hancock, Sayfutdinov
2. (71.1) Ułamek, Bjerre, Adams, Nicholls
3. (69.7) Pedersen, Lindbäck, Jonsson, Gollob
4. (69.4) Holta, Lindgren, Walasek, Andersen
5. (70.7) Holta, Lindbäck, Ułamek, Harris
6. (69.8) Jonsson, Andersen, Adams, Hancock (F2x)
  Hancock crashed on first lap and is excluded.
7. (69.4) Crump, Gollob, Lindgren, Nicholls
8. (70.2) Pedersen, Sayfutdinov, Walasek, Bjerre
9. (72.2) Gollob, Walasek, Adams, Harris
10. (71.1) Hancock, Lindgren, Pedersen, Ułamek
11. (70.5) Lindbäck, Bjerre, Crump, Andersen
12. (69.7) Sayfutdinov, Jonsson, Holta, Nicholls
13. (70.4) Andersen, Harris, Pedersen, Nicholls
14. (70.0) Bjerre, Holta, Hancock, Gollob
15. (69.9) Jonsson, Crump, Ułamek, Walasek
16. (69.8) Sayfutdinov, Lindbäck, Lindgren, Adams
17. (70.4) Lindgren, Jonsson, Bjerre, Harris
18. (71.2) Lindbäck, Walasek, Nicholls, Hancock (E1)
19. (71.1) Pedersen, Crump, Holta, Adams
20. (70.1) Sayfutdinov, Gollob, Ułamek, Andersen (Fx)
  Andersen and Ulamek collided on first lap. Andersen excluded.
  Semi-Finals:
21. (71.2) Lindbäck, Crump, Jonsson, Lindgren (F3x)
  Lindgren falls on lap 3 and is excluded.
22. (70.5) Sayfutdinov, Pedersen, Holta, Bjerre
  The Final:
23. (70.4) Sayfutdinov (6 pts), Crump (4 pts), Lindbäck (2 pts) Pedersen (X)
  Sayfutdinov and Crump crash. Pedersen excluded.

== The intermediate classification ==
Qualifies for next season's Grand Prix series
Full-time Grand Prix rider
Wild card, track reserve or qualified reserve

Pos.	Rider	Points	CZE (Czech Republic)	EUR (Poland)	SWE (Sweden)	DEN (Denmark)	GBR (United Kingdom)	LAT (Latvia)	SCA (Sweden)	NOR (Denmark)	SVN (Slovenia)	ITA (Italy)	POL (Poland)
1	(Australia) (2) Jason Crump	52	14	22	16								
2	(Russia) (15) Emil Sayfutdinov	46	17	9	20								
3	(Sweden) (7) Andreas Jonsson	39	11	16	12								
4	(Denmark) (1) Nicki Pedersen	34	12	9	13								
5	(Poland) (3) Tomasz Gollob	31	7	17	7								
6	(United States) (4) Greg Hancock	31	10	16	5								
7	(Sweden) (10) Fredrik Lindgren	30	19	2	9								
8	(Denmark) (12) Kenneth Bjerre	23	10	5	8								
9	(Australia) (6) Leigh Adams	22	13	6	3								
10	(Poland) (8) Rune Holta	22	3	8	11								
11	(Poland) (14) Sebastian Ułamek	19	5	8	6								
12	(Denmark) (5) Hans N. Andersen	17	6	6	5								
13	(Poland) (13) Grzegorz Walasek	17	6	5	6								
14	(Sweden) (16) Antonio Lindbäck	17	–	–	17								
15	(United Kingdom) (11) Chris Harris	16	6	5	5								
16	(Poland) (16) Jarosław Hampel	9	–	9	–								
17	(United Kingdom) (9) Scott Nicholls	6	4	1	1								
18	(Czech Republic) (16) Matěj Kůs	1	1	–	–								
Rider(s) not classified
	(Czech Republic) (17) Luboš Tomíček, Jr.	—	ns	–	–								
	(Poland) (17) Damian Baliński	—	–	ns	–								
	(Sweden) (17) Ricky Kling	—	–	–	ns								
	(Czech Republic) (18) Adrian Rymel	—	ns	–	–								
	(Poland) (18) Janusz Kołodziej	—	–	ns	–								
	(Sweden) (18) Thomas H. Jonasson	—	–	–	ns								
Pos.	Rider	Points	CZE (Czech Republic)	EUR (Poland)	SWE (Sweden)	DEN (Denmark)	GBR (United Kingdom)	LAT (Latvia)	SCA (Sweden)	NOR (Denmark)	SVN (Slovenia)	ITA (Italy)	POL (Poland)

== See also ==
- Speedway Grand Prix
- List of Speedway Grand Prix riders
