= 2009 Speedway Grand Prix of Czech Republic =

- 2009 FIM Czech Republic Speedway Grand Prix

Information
- Date: 25 April 2009
- City: (Czech Republic) Prague
- Event: 1 of 11 (112)
- Referee: (Germany) Frank Ziegler
- Jury President: (Sweden) Christer Bergström

Stadium details
- Stadium: Markéta Stadium
- Capacity: 17,500
- Length: 353 m (386 yd)
- Track: speedway track

SGP Results
- Best Time: (Russia) Emil Sayfutdinov; 64.01 secs (in Heat 15)
- (gold) Winner: (Russia) Emil Sayfutdinov
- (silver) Runner-up: (Sweden) Fredrik Lindgren
- (bronze) 3rd place: (Australia) Jason Crump

The 2009 Speedway Grand Prix of Czech Republic the first race of the 2009 Speedway Grand Prix season. It took place on 25 April in the Markéta Stadium in Prague, Czech Republic. Czech Republic Grand Prix was won by Russian rider Emil Sayfutdinov.

== Riders ==
The Speedway Grand Prix Commission nominated Matěj Kůs as Wild Card, and Luboš Tomíček, Jr. and Adrian Rymel both as Track Reserves. The riders' starting positions draw for Grand Prix meeting was made on 24 April at 13:00 CET by Mayor of Prague Pavel Bém.

== Heat details ==
Placing	Draw	Rider	Total	1	2	3	4	5	6	7	8	9	10	11	12	13	14	15	16	17	18	19	20	Pts	Pos	21	22	23
1	10	(Russia) (15) Emil Sayfutdinov	17			2			0						2			3		1				8	8		3	3
2	8	(Sweden) (10) Fredrik Lindgren	19		3						2			3			2			3				13	1	2		2
3	12	(Australia) (2) Jason Crump	14			3					1		2			2						1		9	7	3		1
4	2	(Australia) (6) Leigh Adams	13	1					1				3				3				3			11	3		2	0
5	4	(Denmark) (1) Nicki Pedersen	12	3							3				0				2				3	11	2		1
6	6	(Sweden) (7) Andreas Jonsson	11		2				3			2							1			3		11	4	0
7	7	(United States) (4) Greg Hancock	10		E					2					3	3					2			10	5		0
8	9	(Denmark) (12) Kenneth Bjerre	10			1		3						2					3		0			9	6	1
9	1	(Poland) (3) Tomasz Gollob	7	2				2				1				0				2				7	9
10	16	(Poland) (13) Grzegorz Walasek	6				0				0	3						2			1			6	10
11	5	(United Kingdom) (11) Chris Harris	6		1			1					1					1					2	6	11
12	14	(Denmark) (5) Hans N. Andersen	6				1		2					1		1							1	6	12
13	3	(Poland) (14) Sebastian Ułamek	5	0						3				0				0				2		5	13
14	13	(United Kingdom) (9) Scott Nicholls	4				2	0							1		1					0		4	14
15	15	(Poland) (8) Rune Holta	3				3			0			0						0	0				3	15
16	11	(Czech Republic) (16) Matěj Kůs	1			0				1		0					0						0	1	16
17	17	(Czech Republic) (17) Luboš Tomíček, Jr.	-																					-	17
18	18	(Czech Republic) (18) Adrian Rymel	-																					-	18
Placing	Draw	Rider	Total	1	2	3	4	5	6	7	8	9	10	11	12	13	14	15	16	17	18	19	20	Pts	Pos	21	22	23

e: retired or mechanical failure • m: exclusion for exceeding two minute time allowance • t: exclusion for touching the tapes • x: other exclusion • f: fell
ns: non-starter • nc: non-classify
Semi-finals: Heat 21: Riders placed 1st, 4th, 6th & 7th in the intermediate classification (after 20 heats)
Heat 22: Riders placed 2nd, 3rd, 5th & 8th in the intermediate classification (after 20 heats)
Big Final (heat 23): The first and second placed riders in each of the Semi-Finals

gate A – inside	gate B	gate C	gate D – outside

=== Heat after heat ===
1. (65.53) Pedersen, Gollob, Adams, Ułamek
2. (64.72) Lindgren, Jonsson, Harris, Hancock (E/start)
3. (64.58) Crump, Sayfutdinov, Bjerre, Kůs
4. (64.81) Holta, Nicholls, Andersen, Walasek
5. (65.31) Bjerre, Gollob, Harris, Nicholls
6. (64.23) Jonsson, Andersen, Adams, Sayfutdinov
7. (64.71) Ułamek, Hancock, Kůs, Holta
8. (65.03) Pedersen, Lindgren, Crump, Walasek
9. (64.97) Walasek, Jonsson, Gollob, Kůs
10. (64.61) Adams, Crump, Harris, Holta
11. (65.19) Lindgren, Bjerre, Andersen, Ułamek
12. (64.68) Hancock, Sayfutdinov, Nicholls, Pedersen
13. (64.31) Hancock, Crump, Andersen, Gollob
14. (64.59) Adams, Lindgren, Nicholls, Kůs
15. (64.01) Sayfutdinov, Walasek, Harris, Ułamek
16. (64.80) Bjerre, Pedersen, Jonsson, Holta
17. (65.08) Lindgren, Gollob, Sayfutdinov, Holta
18. (64.94) Adams, Hancock, Walasek, Bjerre
19. (64.67) Jonsson, Ułamek, Crump, Nicholls
20. (?) Pedersen, Harris, Andersen, Kůs
  Semi-Finals:
21. (64.82) Crump, Lindgren, Bjerre, Jonsson
22. (65.57) Sayfutdinov, Adams, Pedersen, Hancock
  Sayfutdinov falls on first heat - all 4 riders restart.
  The Final:
23. (64.44) Sayfutdinov, Lindgren, Crump, Adams

== The intermediate classification ==
Qualifies for next season's Grand Prix series
Full-time Grand Prix rider
Wild card, track reserve or qualified reserve

Pos.	Rider	Points	CZE (Czech Republic)	EUR (Poland)	SWE (Sweden)	DEN (Denmark)	GBR (United Kingdom)	LAT (Latvia)	SCA (Sweden)	NOR (Denmark)	SVN (Slovenia)	ITA (Italy)	POL (Poland)
1	(Sweden) (10) Fredrik Lindgren	19	19										
2	(Russia) (15) Emil Sayfutdinov	17	17										
3	(Australia) (2) Jason Crump	14	14										
4	(Australia) (6) Leigh Adams	13	13										
5	(Denmark) (1) Nicki Pedersen	12	12										
6	(Sweden) (7) Andreas Jonsson	11	11										
7	(United States) (4) Greg Hancock	10	10										
8	(Denmark) (12) Kenneth Bjerre	10	10										
9	(Poland) (3) Tomasz Gollob	7	7										
10	(Denmark) (5) Hans N. Andersen	6	6										
11	(United Kingdom) (11) Chris Harris	6	6										
12	(Poland) (13) Grzegorz Walasek	6	6										
13	(Poland) (14) Sebastian Ułamek	5	5										
14	(United Kingdom) (9) Scott Nicholls	4	4										
15	(Poland) (8) Rune Holta	3	3										
16	(Czech Republic) (16) Matěj Kůs	1	1										
Rider(s) not classified
	(Czech Republic) (17) Luboš Tomíček, Jr.	—	ns										
	(Czech Republic) (18) Adrian Rymel	—	ns										
Pos.	Rider	Points	CZE (Czech Republic)	EUR (Poland)	SWE (Sweden)	DEN (Denmark)	GBR (United Kingdom)	LAT (Latvia)	SCA (Sweden)	NOR (Denmark)	SVN (Slovenia)	ITA (Italy)	POL (Poland)

== See also ==
- Speedway Grand Prix
- List of Speedway Grand Prix riders
