= 2009 Speedway Grand Prix of Great Britain =

Speedway race in Cardiff, Wales

(United Kingdom) 2009 Speedway Grand Prix of Great Britain
- 2009 FIM British Speedway Grand Prix

Information
- Date: 27 June 2009
- City: (United Kingdom) Cardiff
- Event: 5 of 11 (116)
- Referee: (Germany) Frank Ziegler
- Jury President: (Sweden) Christer Bergström

Stadium details
- Stadium: Millennium Stadium
- Capacity: 62,500
- Length: 275 m (301 yd)
- Track: temporary

SGP Results
- Best Time
- (gold) Winner: (Australia) Jason Crump
- (silver) Runner-up: (Sweden) Fredrik Lindgren
- (bronze) 3rd place: (Denmark) Hans N. Andersen

The 2009 FIM Speedway World Championship Grand Prix of Great Britain was the fifth race of the 2009 Speedway Grand Prix season. It took place on 27 June 2009 in the Millennium Stadium in Cardiff, Great Britain.

The British Grand Prix was won by GP leader Jason Crump who beat Fredrik Lindgren, Hans Andersen and Greg Hancock in the final. Crump won with a 24-point maximum score and it was his third Grand Prix win of the season.

== Riders ==
One wild card and two track reserves were nominated by the Auto-Cycle Union. Edward Kennett was selected as the wild card after finishing second behind Chris Harris at the 2009 British Speedway Championship. Tai Woffinden and Simon Stead will be the track reserves. The riders' starting positions draw for Grand Prix meeting was made on 26 June at 12:00 CET and it was carried out by Jury President Christer Bergström and Miss Wales Chloe-Beth Morgan.

== Heat details ==
Placing	Draw	Rider	Total	1	2	3	4	5	6	7	8	9	10	11	12	13	14	15	16	17	18	19	20	Pts	Pos	21	22	23
1	15	(Australia) (2) Jason Crump	24				3			3			3						3	3				15	1	3		3
2	6	(Sweden) (10) Fredrik Lindgren	16		1				3			3							2			1		10	4	2		2
3	8	(Denmark) (5) Hans N. Andersen	15		3						3			3			1			1				11	2		2	1
4	7	(United States) (4) Greg Hancock	14		2					2					2	2					3			11	3		3	0
5	13	(United Kingdom) (11) Chris Harris	9				2	2							0		2					3		9	5		X
6	11	(Poland) (3) Tomasz Gollob	9			0				1		2					3						2	8	7	1
7	9	(Poland) (14) Sebastian Ułamek	8			3		3						1					1		0			8	6	0
8	2	(Denmark) (1) Nicki Pedersen	8	2					2				2				0				2			8	8		Fx
9	4	(Poland) (8) Rune Holta	7	F4x							1				3				F3x				3	7	9
10	3	(Denmark) (12) Kenneth Bjerre	7	3						0				2				0				2		7	10
11	1	(Russia) (15) Emil Sayfutdinov	7	1				0				1				3				2				7	11
12	5	(United Kingdom) (9) Scott Nicholls	6		0			1					1					3					1	6	12
13	10	(Sweden) (7) Andreas Jonsson	5			2			e4						1			2		X				5	13
14	12	(United Kingdom) (16) Edward Kennett	4			1					2		0			1						0		4	14
15	16	(Australia) (6) Leigh Adams	3				1				0	0						1			1			3	15
16	14	(Poland) (13) Grzegorz Walasek	1				0		1					e3		0							0	1	16
17	17	(United Kingdom) (17) Tai Woffinden	-																					-	17
18	18	(United Kingdom) (18) Simon Stead	-																					-	18
Placing	Draw	Rider	Total	1	2	3	4	5	6	7	8	9	10	11	12	13	14	15	16	17	18	19	20	Pts	Pos	21	22	23

e: retired or mechanical failure • m: exclusion for exceeding two minute time allowance • t: exclusion for touching the tapes • x: other exclusion • f: fell
ns: non-starter • nc: non-classify
Semi-finals: Heat 21: Riders placed 1st, 4th, 6th & 7th in the intermediate classification (after 20 heats)
Heat 22: Riders placed 2nd, 3rd, 5th & 8th in the intermediate classification (after 20 heats)
Big Final (heat 23): The first and second placed riders in each of the Semi-Finals

gate A – inside	gate B	gate C	gate D – outside

=== Heat after heat ===
1. Bjerre, Pedersen, Sayfutdinov, Holta (F4x)
  Holta crashes on 2nd lap. Holta excluded.
2. Andersen, Hancock, Lindgren, Nicholls
3. Ułamek, Jonsson, Kennett, Gollob
4. Crump, Harris, Adams, Walasek
5. Ułamek, Harris, Nicholls, Sayfutdinov
6. Lindgren, Pedersen, Walasek, Jonsson (e4)
7. Crump, Hancock, Gollob, Bjerre
8. Andersen, Kennett, Holta, Adams
9. Lindgren, Gollob, Sayfutdinov, Adams
10. Crump, Pedersen, Nicholls, Kennett
11. Andersen, Bjerre, Ułamek, Walasek (e3)
12. Holta, Hancock, Jonsson, Harris
13. Sayfutdinov, Hancock, Kennett, Walasek
14. Gollob, Harris, Andersen, Pedersen
15. Nicholls, Jonsson, Adams, Bjerre
16. Crump, Lindgren, Ułamek, Holta (F3x)
  Holta crashes. Holta excluded.
17. Crump, Sayfutdinov, Andersen, Jonsson (X)
  Crump crashes on first lap. Jonsson excluded.
18. Hancock, Pedersen, Adams, Ułamek
19. Harris, Bjerre, Lindgren, Kennett
20. Holta, Gollob, Nicholls, Walasek
  Semi-Finals:
21. Crump, Lindgren, Gollob, Ułamek
22. Hancock, Andersen, Pedersen (Fx), Harris (X)
  Andersen crashes on 1st lap. Harris excluded. Nicki Pedersen crashes on 1st lap - race stopped again. Pedersen excluded.
  The Final:
23. Crump, Lindgren, Andersen, Hancock

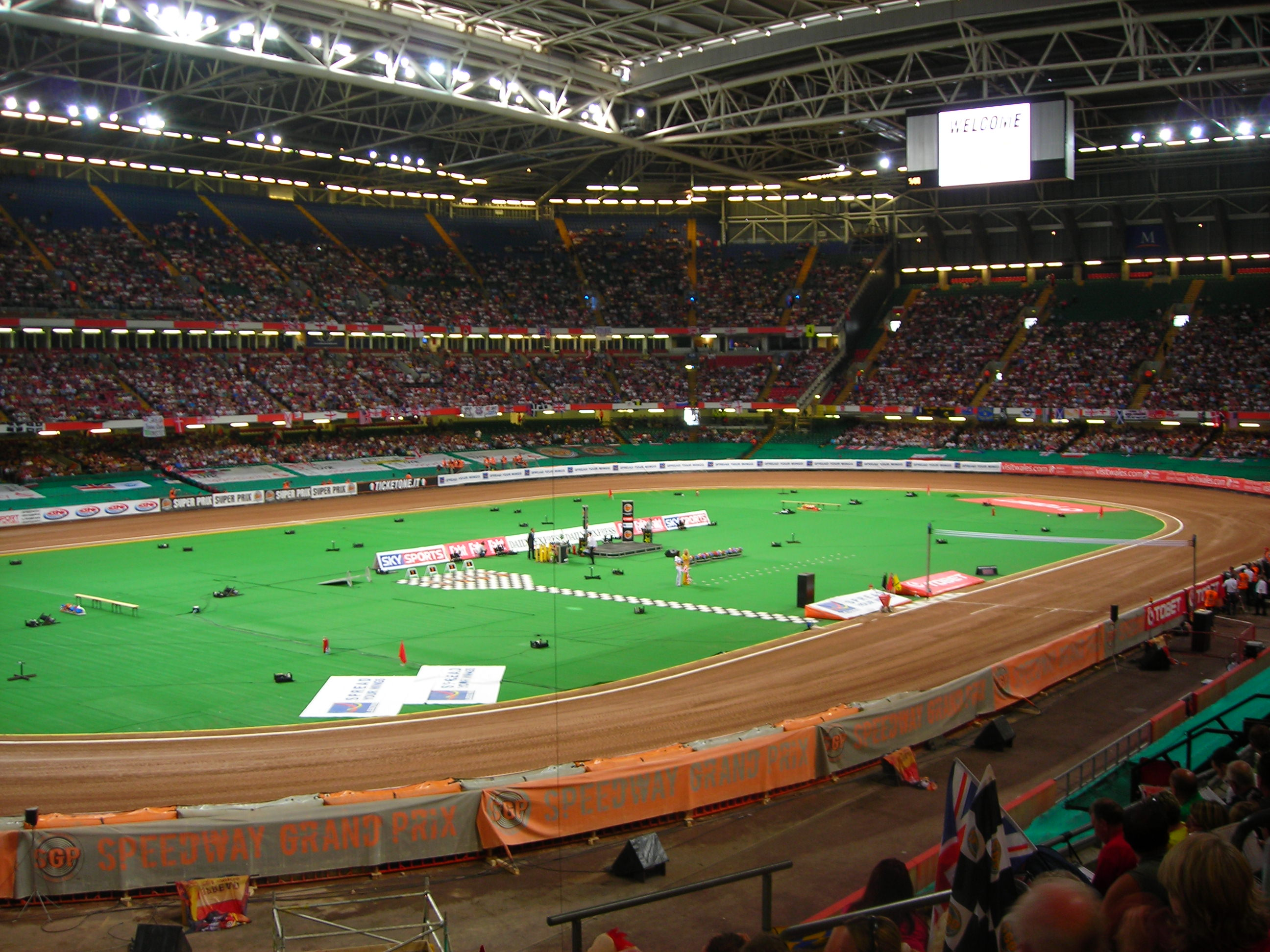
The 2009 British Grand Prix at the Millennium Stadium

== The intermediate classification ==
Qualifies for next season's Grand Prix series
Full-time Grand Prix rider
Wild card, track reserve or qualified reserve

Pos.	Rider	Points	CZE (Czech Republic)	EUR (Poland)	SWE (Sweden)	DEN (Denmark)	GBR (United Kingdom)	LAT (Latvia)	SCA (Sweden)	NOR (Denmark)	SVN (Slovenia)	ITA (Italy)	POL (Poland)
1	(Australia) (2) Jason Crump	98	14	22	16	22	24						
2	(Russia) (15) Emil Sayfutdinov	67	17	9	20	14	7						
3	(United States) (4) Greg Hancock	59	10	16	5	14	14						
4	(Poland) (3) Tomasz Gollob	53	7	17	7	13	9						
5	(Denmark) (1) Nicki Pedersen	52	12	9	13	10	8						
6	(Sweden) (7) Andreas Jonsson	51	11	16	12	7	5						
7	(Sweden) (10) Fredrik Lindgren	49	19	2	9	3	16						
8	(Denmark) (5) Hans N. Andersen	38	6	6	5	6	15						
9	(Denmark) (12) Kenneth Bjerre	38	10	5	8	8	7						
10	(Poland) (14) Sebastian Ułamek	35	5	8	6	8	8						
11	(Poland) (8) Rune Holta	34	3	8	11	5	7						
12	(Australia) (6) Leigh Adams	31	13	6	3	6	3						
13	(United Kingdom) (11) Chris Harris	30	6	5	5	5	9						
14	(Poland) (13) Grzegorz Walasek	25	6	5	6	7	1						
15	(United Kingdom) (9) Scott Nicholls	17	4	1	1	5	6						
16	(Sweden) (16) Antonio Lindbäck	17	–	–	17	–	–						
17	(Denmark) (16) Niels Kristian Iversen	11	–	–	–	11	–						
18	(Poland) (16) Jarosław Hampel	9	–	9	–	–	–						
19	(United Kingdom) (16) Edward Kennett	4	–	–	–	–	4						
20	(Czech Republic) (16) Matěj Kůs	1	1	–	–	–	–						
Rider(s) not classified
	(Czech Republic) (17) Luboš Tomíček, Jr.	—	ns	–	–	–	–						
	(Poland) (17) Damian Baliński	—	–	ns	–	–	–						
	(Sweden) (17) Ricky Kling	—	–	–	ns	–	–						
	(Denmark) (17) Patrick Hougaard	—	–	–	–	ns	–						
	(United Kingdom) (17) Tai Woffinden	—	–	–	–	–	ns						
	(Czech Republic) (18) Adrian Rymel	—	ns	–	–	–	–						
	(Poland) (18) Janusz Kołodziej	—	–	ns	–	–	–						
	(Sweden) (18) Thomas H. Jonasson	—	–	–	ns	–	–						
	(Denmark) (18) Nicolai Klindt	—	–	–	–	ns	–						
	(United Kingdom) (18) Simon Stead	—	–	–	–	–	ns						
Pos.	Rider	Points	CZE (Czech Republic)	EUR (Poland)	SWE (Sweden)	DEN (Denmark)	GBR (United Kingdom)	LAT (Latvia)	SCA (Sweden)	NOR (Denmark)	SVN (Slovenia)	ITA (Italy)	POL (Poland)

== See also ==
- Speedway Grand Prix
- List of Speedway Grand Prix riders
