= 2009 Speedway Grand Prix of Denmark =

- 2009 FIM Dansk Metal Danish Speedway Grand Prix

Information
- Date: 13 June 2009
- City: (Denmark) Copenhagen
- Event: 4 of 11 (115)
- Referee: (Sweden) Krister Gardell
- Jury President: (Finland) Ilkka Teromaa

Stadium details
- Stadium: Parken Stadium
- Length: 275 m (301 yd)
- Track: temporary

SGP Results
- Best Time: (Poland) Sebastian Ułamek; 54.5 secs (in Heat 5)
- (gold) Winner: (Australia) Jason Crump
- (silver) Runner-up: (United States) Greg Hancock
- (bronze) 3rd place: (Poland) Tomasz Gollob

The 2009 FIM Speedway World Championship Grand Prix of Denmark was the fourth race of the 2009 Speedway Grand Prix season. It took take place on 13 June 2009 in the Parken Stadium in Copenhagen, Denmark.

The Grand Prix was won by Australian Jason Crump who beat American Greg Hancock, Pole Tomasz Gollob and Danish wild card Niels Kristian Iversen in the final. It was Crump's second Grand Prix win of the 2009 season.

== Riders ==
The Speedway Grand Prix Commission nominated Niels Kristian Iversen as the wild card and Patrick Hougaard and Nicolai Klindt as the first and second track reserves. The riders' starting positions draw for Grand Prix meeting was made on 12 June at 13:00 CET.

== Heat details ==
Placing	Draw	Rider	Total	1	2	3	4	5	6	7	8	9	10	11	12	13	14	15	16	17	18	19	20	Pts	Pos	21	22	23
1	5	(Australia) (2) Jason Crump	22		2			2					3					3					3	13	2		3	3
2	10	(United States) (4) Greg Hancock	14			1			2						3			0		2				8	5		2	2
3	4	(Poland) (3) Tomasz Gollob	13	1							3				1				1				2	8	6	3		1
4	11	(Denmark) (16) Niels Kristian Iversen	11			3				2		0					3						1	9	4	2		0
5	3	(Russia) (15) Emil Sayfutdinov	14	3						3				3				2				3		14	1	T
6	15	(Denmark) (1) Nicki Pedersen	10				3			Fx			1						3	3				10	3		E3
7	1	(Poland) (14) Sebastian Ułamek	8	0				3				3				0				1				7	7	1
8	14	(Denmark) (12) Kenneth Bjerre	8				2		3					0		2							0	7	8		1
9	8	(Poland) (13) Grzegorz Walasek	7		3						1			1			2			0				7	9
10	9	(Sweden) (7) Andreas Jonsson	7			2		0						2					2		1			7	10
11	2	(Denmark) (5) Hans N. Andersen	6	2					1				0				1				2			6	11
12	13	(Australia) (6) Leigh Adams	6				1	1							2		0					2		6	12
13	16	(United Kingdom) (9) Scott Nicholls	5				0				0	1						1			3			5	13
14	7	(United Kingdom) (11) Chris Harris	5		1					1					0	3					0			5	14
15	12	(Poland) (8) Rune Holta	5			0					2		2			1						0		5	15
16	6	(Sweden) (10) Fredrik Lindgren	3		0				0			2							0			1		3	16
17	17	(Denmark) (17) Patrick Hougaard	-																					-	17
18	18	(Denmark) (18) Nicolai Klindt	-																					-	18
Placing	Draw	Rider	Total	1	2	3	4	5	6	7	8	9	10	11	12	13	14	15	16	17	18	19	20	Pts	Pos	21	22	23

e: retired or mechanical failure • m: exclusion for exceeding two minute time allowance • t: exclusion for touching the tapes • x: other exclusion • f: fell
ns: non-starter • nc: non-classify
Semi-finals: Heat 21: Riders placed 1st, 4th, 6th & 7th in the intermediate classification (after 20 heats)
Heat 22: Riders placed 2nd, 3rd, 5th & 8th in the intermediate classification (after 20 heats)
Big Final (heat 23): The first and second placed riders in each of the Semi-Finals

gate A – inside	gate B	gate C	gate D – outside

=== Heat after heat ===
1. (55.8) Sayfutdinov, Andersen, Gollob, Ułamek
2. (55.7) Walasek, Crump, Harris, Lingren
3. (55.8) Iversen, Jonsson, Hancock, Holta
4. (55.4) Pedersen, Bjerre, Adams, Nicholls
5. (54.5) Ułamek, Crump, Adams, Jonsson
6. (55.0) Bjerre, Hancock, Andersen, Lindgren
7. (54.8) Sayfutdinov, Iversen, Harris, Pedersen (Fx)
  Pedersen and Sayfutdinov crash. Pedersen is excluded.
8. (55.7) Gollob, Holta, Walasek, Nicholls
9. (55.1) Ułamek, Lindgren, Nicholls, Iversen
  Ulamek and Nicholls clash. Race restarted.
10. (55.0) Crump, Holta, Pedersen, Andersen
11. (55.0) Sayfutdinov, Jonsson, Pedersen, Andersen
12. (55.7) Hancock, Adams, Gollob, Harris
13. (55.6) Harris, Bjerre, Holta, Ułamek
14. (55.9) Iversen, Walasek, Andersen, Adams
15. (54.7) Crump, Sayfutdinov, Nicholls, Hancock
16. (55.4) Pedersen, Jonsson, Gollob, Lindgren
17. (56.2) Pedersen, Hancock, Ułamek, Walasek
18. (56.0) Nicholls, Andersen, Jonsson, Harris
19. (54.9) Sayfutdinov, Adams, Lindgren, Holta
20. (55.4) Crump, Gollob, Iversen, Bjerre
  Semi-Finals:
21. (57.5) Gollob, Iversen, Ułamek, Sayfutdinov (T)
  Sayfutdinov makes false start and is excluded.
22. (56.3) Crump, Hancock, Bjerre, Pedersen (E3)
  The Final:
23. (55.3) Crump, Hancock, Gollob, Iversen

== The intermediate classification ==
Qualifies for next season's Grand Prix series
Full-time Grand Prix rider
Wild card, track reserve or qualified reserve

Pos.	Rider	Points	CZE (Czech Republic)	EUR (Poland)	SWE (Sweden)	DEN (Denmark)	GBR (United Kingdom)	LAT (Latvia)	SCA (Sweden)	NOR (Denmark)	SVN (Slovenia)	ITA (Italy)	POL (Poland)
1	(Australia) (2) Jason Crump	74	14	22	16	22							
2	(Russia) (15) Emil Sayfutdinov	60	17	9	20	14							
3	(Sweden) (7) Andreas Jonsson	46	11	16	12	7							
4	(United States) (4) Greg Hancock	45	10	16	5	14							
5	(Denmark) (1) Nicki Pedersen	44	12	9	13	10							
6	(Poland) (3) Tomasz Gollob	44	7	17	7	13							
7	(Sweden) (10) Fredrik Lindgren	33	19	2	9	3							
8	(Denmark) (12) Kenneth Bjerre	31	10	5	8	8							
9	(Australia) (6) Leigh Adams	28	13	6	3	6							
10	(Poland) (8) Rune Holta	27	3	8	11	5							
11	(Poland) (14) Sebastian Ułamek	27	5	8	6	8							
12	(Poland) (13) Grzegorz Walasek	24	6	5	6	7							
13	(Denmark) (5) Hans N. Andersen	23	6	6	5	6							
14	(United Kingdom) (11) Chris Harris	21	6	5	5	5							
15	(Sweden) (16) Antonio Lindbäck	17	–	–	17	–							
16	(United Kingdom) (9) Scott Nicholls	11	4	1	1	5							
17	(Denmark) (16) Niels Kristian Iversen	11	–	–	–	11							
18	(Poland) (16) Jarosław Hampel	9	–	9	–	–							
19	(Czech Republic) (16) Matěj Kůs	1	1	–	–	–							
Rider(s) not classified
	(Czech Republic) (17) Luboš Tomíček, Jr.	—	ns	–	–	–							
	(Poland) (17) Damian Baliński	—	–	ns	–	–							
	(Sweden) (17) Ricky Kling	—	–	–	ns	–							
	(Denmark) (17) Patrick Hougaard	—	–	–	–	ns							
	(Czech Republic) (18) Adrian Rymel	—	ns	–	–	–							
	(Poland) (18) Janusz Kołodziej	—	–	ns	–	–							
	(Sweden) (18) Thomas H. Jonasson	—	–	–	ns	–							
	(Denmark) (18) Nicolai Klindt	—	–	–	–	ns							
Pos.	Rider	Points	CZE (Czech Republic)	EUR (Poland)	SWE (Sweden)	DEN (Denmark)	GBR (United Kingdom)	LAT (Latvia)	SCA (Sweden)	NOR (Denmark)	SVN (Slovenia)	ITA (Italy)	POL (Poland)

== See also ==
- Speedway Grand Prix
- List of Speedway Grand Prix riders
