= 2009 Speedway Grand Prix of Latvia =

Is really fast and excitement

- 2009 FIM Latvijas Mobilais Telefons Speedway Grand Prix

Information
- Date: 1 August 2009
- City: (Latvia) Daugavpils
- Event: 6 of 11 (117)
- Referee: (Hungary) István Daragó
- Jury President: (Germany) Wolfgang Glas

Stadium details
- Stadium: Latvijas Spidveja Centrs
- Capacity: 10,500

SGP Results
- Best Time
- (gold) Winner: (United States) Greg Hancock
- (silver) Runner-up: (Denmark) Kenneth Bjerre
- (bronze) 3rd place: (Poland) Tomasz Gollob

The 2009 FIM Speedway World Championship Grand Prix of Latvia was the sixth race of the 2009 Speedway Grand Prix season. It took place on 1 August in the Latvijas Spidveja Centrs in Daugavpils, Latvia.

The Latvian Grand Prix was won by American Greg Hancock, who beat Kenneth Bjerre, Tomasz Gollob and GP leader Jason Crump in the final.

== Riders ==
2008 World Champion Nicki Pedersen was injured at 2009 Speedway World Cup Event 1 (undergoing skin graft surgery on burns to his left leg). On Monday 20 July he had an operation. Pedersen said, "The wounds need to be completely healed before I get back on the bike, otherwise I could risk having problems for the rest of the season". At the Latvia SGP Pedersen will be replaced by first Qualified Substitutes Niels Kristian Iversen, Dane also. The Speedway Grand Prix Commission nominated Grigory Laguta as a Wild Card, and Maksims Bogdanovs and Vjačeslavs Giruckis, both as Track Reserve. The riders' starting positions draw for Grand Prix meeting was made on 31 July by Jānis Lāčplēsis, the President of Latvian Track Racing Commission.

- Draw Nr 1 change: (Denmark) (1) Nicki Pedersen → (Denmark) (19) Niels Kristian Iversen

== Heat details ==
Placing	Draw	Rider	Total	1	2	3	4	5	6	7	8	9	10	11	12	13	14	15	16	17	18	19	20	Pts	Pos	21	22	23
1	14	(United States) (4) Greg Hancock	20				1		3					3		2							2	11	2		3	3
2	7	(Denmark) (12) Kenneth Bjerre	15		1					3					3	0					2			9	4	2		2
3	15	(Poland) (3) Tomasz Gollob	16				3			2			1						3	2				11	1	3		1
4	2	(Australia) (2) Jason Crump	10	1					0				3				3				1			8	8		2	0
5	4	(Australia) (6) Leigh Adams	11	3							2				2				0				3	10	3		1
6	3	(Russia) (15) Emil Sayfutdinov	10	2						1				1				3				2		9	6	1
7	6	(Denmark) (5) Hans N. Andersen	9		0				2			3							1			3		9	5		0
8	1	(Denmark) (19) Niels Kristian Iversen	8	0				0				2				3				3				8	7	0
9	12	(Poland) (8) Rune Holta	7			2					1		2			1						1		7	9
10	16	(Poland) (13) Grzegorz Walasek	6				0				3	0						0			3			6	10
11	13	(Sweden) (7) Andreas Jonsson	6				2	3							0		1					0		6	11
12	8	(Poland) (14) Sebastian Ułamek	6		3						0			2			0			1				6	12
13	10	(Russia) (16) Grigory Laguta	6			3			1						1			1		X				6	13
14	5	(Sweden) (10) Fredrik Lindgren	6		2			1					0					2					1	6	14
15	9	(United Kingdom) (11) Chris Harris	5			1		2						0					2		0			5	15
16	11	(United Kingdom) (9) Scott Nicholls	3			0				0		1					2						0	3	16
17	17	(Latvia) (17) Maksims Bogdanovs	-																					-	17
18	18	(Latvia) (18) Vjačeslavs Giruckis	-																					-	18
Placing	Draw	Rider	Total	1	2	3	4	5	6	7	8	9	10	11	12	13	14	15	16	17	18	19	20	Pts	Pos	21	22	23

e: retired or mechanical failure • m: exclusion for exceeding two minute time allowance • t: exclusion for touching the tapes • x: other exclusion • f: fell
ns: non-starter • nc: non-classify
Semi-finals: Heat 21: Riders placed 1st, 4th, 6th & 7th in the intermediate classification (after 20 heats)
Heat 22: Riders placed 2nd, 3rd, 5th & 8th in the intermediate classification (after 20 heats)
Big Final (heat 23): The first and second placed riders in each of the Semi-Finals

gate A – inside	gate B	gate C	gate D – outside

=== Heat after heat ===
1. Adams, Sayfutdinov, Crump, Iversen
2. Ułamek, Lindgren, Bjerre, Andersen
3. Laguta, Holta, Harris, Nicholls
4. Gollob, Jonsson, Hancock, Walasek
5. Jonsson, Harris, Lindgren, Iversen
6. Hancock, Andersen, Laguta, Crump
7. Bjerre, Gollob, Sayfutdinov, Nicholls
8. Walasek, Adams, Holta, Ułamek
9. Andersen, Iversen, Nicholls, Walasek
10. Crump, Holta, Gollob, Lindgren
11. Hancock, Ułamek, Sayfutdinov, Harris
12. Bjerre, Adams, Laguta, Jonsson
13. Iversen, Hancock, Holta, Bjerre
14. Crump, Nicholls, Jonsson, Ułamek
15. Sayfutdinov, Lindgren, Laguta, Walasek
16. Gollob, Harris, Andersen, Adams
17. Iversen, Gollob, Ułamek, Laguta (X)
18. Walasek, Bjerre, Crump, Harris
19. Andersen, Sayfutdinov, Holta, Jonsson
20. Adams, Hancock, Lindgren, Nicholls
  Semi-Finals:
21. Gollob, Bjerre, Sajfutdinov, Iversen
22. Hancock, Crump, Adams, Andersen
  The Final:
23. Hancock (6 pts), Bjerre (4 pts), Gollob (2 pts), Crump (0 pts)

== The intermediate classification ==
Qualifies for next season's Grand Prix series
Full-time Grand Prix rider
Wild card, track reserve or qualified reserve

Pos.	Rider	Points	CZE (Czech Republic)	EUR (Poland)	SWE (Sweden)	DEN (Denmark)	GBR (United Kingdom)	LAT (Latvia)	SCA (Sweden)	NOR (Denmark)	SVN (Slovenia)	ITA (Italy)	POL (Poland)
1	(Australia) (2) Jason Crump	108	14	22	16	22	24	10					
2	(United States) (4) Greg Hancock	79	10	16	5	14	14	20					
3	(Russia) (15) Emil Sayfutdinov	77	17	9	20	14	7	10					
4	(Poland) (3) Tomasz Gollob	69	7	17	7	13	9	16					
5	(Sweden) (7) Andreas Jonsson	57	11	16	12	7	5	6					
6	(Sweden) (10) Fredrik Lindgren	55	19	2	9	3	16	6					
7	(Denmark) (12) Kenneth Bjerre	53	10	5	8	8	7	15					
8	(Denmark) (1) Nicki Pedersen	52	12	9	13	10	8	–					
9	(Denmark) (5) Hans N. Andersen	47	6	6	5	6	15	9					
10	(Australia) (6) Leigh Adams	42	13	6	3	6	3	11					
11	(Poland) (8) Rune Holta	41	3	8	11	5	7	7					
12	(Poland) (14) Sebastian Ułamek	41	5	8	6	8	8	6					
13	(United Kingdom) (11) Chris Harris	35	6	5	5	5	9	5					
14	(Poland) (13) Grzegorz Walasek	31	6	5	6	7	1	6					
15	(United Kingdom) (9) Scott Nicholls	20	4	1	1	5	6	3					
16	(Denmark) (16) (19) Niels Kristian Iversen	19	–	–	–	11	–	8					
17	(Sweden) (16) Antonio Lindbäck	17	–	–	17	–	–	–					
18	(Poland) (16) Jarosław Hampel	9	–	9	–	–	–	–					
19	(Russia) (16) Grigory Laguta	6	–	–	–	–	–	6					
20	(United Kingdom) (16) Edward Kennett	4	–	–	–	–	4	–					
21	(Czech Republic) (16) Matěj Kůs	1	1	–	–	–	–	–					
Rider(s) not classified
	(Czech Republic) (17) Luboš Tomíček, Jr.	—	ns	–	–	–	–	–					
	(Poland) (17) Damian Baliński	—	–	ns	–	–	–	–					
	(Sweden) (17) Ricky Kling	—	–	–	ns	–	–	–					
	(Denmark) (17) Patrick Hougaard	—	–	–	–	ns	–	–					
	(United Kingdom) (17) Tai Woffinden	—	–	–	–	–	ns	–					
	(Latvia) (17) Maksims Bogdanovs	—	–	–	–	–	–	ns					
	(Czech Republic) (18) Adrian Rymel	—	ns	–	–	–	–	–					
	(Poland) (18) Janusz Kołodziej	—	–	ns	–	–	–	–					
	(Sweden) (18) Thomas H. Jonasson	—	–	–	ns	–	–	–					
	(Denmark) (18) Nicolai Klindt	—	–	–	–	ns	–	–					
	(United Kingdom) (18) Simon Stead	—	–	–	–	–	ns	–					
	(Latvia) (18) Vjačeslavs Giruckis	—	–	–	–	–	–	ns					
Pos.	Rider	Points	CZE (Czech Republic)	EUR (Poland)	SWE (Sweden)	DEN (Denmark)	GBR (United Kingdom)	LAT (Latvia)	SCA (Sweden)	NOR (Denmark)	SVN (Slovenia)	ITA (Italy)	POL (Poland)

== See also ==
- Speedway Grand Prix
- List of Speedway Grand Prix riders
