= 2009 Speedway Grand Prix =

15th season of the Speedway Grand Prix

Season details
- Dates: April 25 – October 17
- Events: 11
- Cities: 11
- Countries: 8
- Riders: 15 permanents 1 wild card(s); 2 track reserves
- Heats: 253 (in 11 events)

Winners
- Champion: AUS Jason Crump
- Runner-up: POL Tomasz Gollob
- 3rd place: RUS Emil Sayfutdinov

The 2009 Speedway Grand Prix was the 64th edition of the official World Championship and the 15th season of the Speedway Grand Prix era, deciding Fédération Internationale de Motocyclisme Speedway World Championship. It is the third series under the promotion of Benfield Sports International, an IMG company.

== Qualification ==
For the 2008 season, there was the 15 permanent riders, to be joined at each Grand Prix by one wild card and two track reserves.

=== 2008 Grand Prix ===
The top eight riders from the 2008 championship qualified as of right. These eight qualifiers are, in championship order:

1. (Denmark) (1) Nicki Pedersen
2. (Australia) (2) Jason Crump
3. (Poland) (3) Tomasz Gollob
4. (United States) (4) Greg Hancock
5. (Denmark) (5) Hans Andersen
6. (Australia) (6) Leigh Adams
7. (Sweden) (7) Andreas Jonsson
8. (Poland) (8) Rune Holta

=== Grand Prix Challenge ===
The top eight riders from the 2008 championship were joined by three riders who qualified via the Grand Prix Challenge. These riders are, in order by qualifying position:

- (Denmark) (12) Kenneth Bjerre
- (Poland) (13) Grzegorz Walasek
- (Poland) (14) Sebastian Ułamek

=== Nominations ===
The final four riders were nominated by series promoters, Benfield Sports International, following the completion of the 2008 season. Riders were nominated after the season ended on October 28, 2008.

- (United Kingdom) (9) Scott Nicholls
- (Sweden) (10) Fredrik Lindgren
- (United Kingdom) (11) Chris Harris
- (Russia) (15) Emil Sayfutdinov

== Permanent riders ==
No	Rider	DOB	Age	2009 Clubs				
No	Rider	DOB	Age	(Poland) Polish	(Sweden) Swedish	(United Kingdom) British	(Denmark) Danish	(Russia) Russian
1	DEN Nicki Pedersen	1977-04-02	32	Częstochowa	Lejonen		Holsted	Togliatti (RUS)
2	AUS Jason Crump	1975-08-06	34	Wrocław	Elit Vetlanda	Belle Vue		
3	POL Tomasz Gollob	1971-04-11	38	Gorzów Wlkp.	Västervik		Esbjerg	
4	USA Greg Hancock	1970-06-03	39	Częstochowa	Rospiggarna			
5	DEN Hans Andersen	1980-11-03	29	Gdańsk	Dackarna	Poole	Slangerup	
6	AUS Leigh Adams	1971-04-28	38	Leszno	Lejonen	Swindon		
7	SWE Andreas Jonsson	1980-09-03	29	Bydgoszcz	Dackarna		Grindsted	
8	POL Rune Holta	1973-08-29	36	Gorzów Wlkp.	Indianerna			
9	GBR Scott Nicholls	1978-05-16	31	Wrocław	Vargarna	Ipswich		
10	SWE Fredrik Lindgren	1985-09-15	24	Zielona Góra	Dackarna	Wolverhampton		
11	GBR Chris Harris	1982-11-28	27	Ostrów Wlkp.	Västervik	Coventry		
12	DEN Kenneth Bjerre	1984-05-24	25	Gdańsk	Dackarna	Peterborough	Vojens	
13	POL Grzegorz Walasek	1976-08-29	33	Zielona Góra	Indianerna			
14	POL Sebastian Ułamek	1975-11-20	34	Tarnów	Lejonen		Fjelsted	
15	RUS Emil Sayfutdinov	1989-10-26	19	Bydgoszcz	Piraterna		Vojens	Balakovo (RUS)
No	Rider	DOB	Age	(Poland) Polish	(Sweden) Swedish	(United Kingdom) British	(Denmark) Danish	(Russia) Russian
No	Rider	DOB	Age	2009 Clubs				

== Calendar ==
Calendar is confirmed.

Round	Date	City and venue	Winner	Runner-up	3rd placed	4th placed	Results
1	April 25	(Czech Republic) Prague , Czech Republic; Markéta Stadium	(Russia) Emil Sayfutdinov	(Sweden) Fredrik Lindgren	(Australia) Jason Crump	(Australia) Leigh Adams	results
2	May 9	Leszno , Poland; Alfred Smoczyk Stadium	(Australia) Jason Crump	(Poland) Tomasz Gollob	(Sweden) Andreas Jonsson	(United States) Greg Hancock	results
3	May 30	(Sweden) Gothenburg , Sweden; Ullevi	(Russia) Emil Sayfutdinov	(Australia) Jason Crump	(Sweden) Antonio Lindbäck	(Denmark) Nicki Pedersen	results
4	June 13	(Denmark) Copenhagen , Denmark; Parken Stadium	(Australia) Jason Crump	(United States) Greg Hancock	(Poland) Tomasz Gollob	(Denmark) Niels Kristian Iversen	results
5	June 27	(United Kingdom) Cardiff , Great Britain; Millennium Stadium	(Australia) Jason Crump	(Sweden) Fredrik Lindgren	(Denmark) Hans N. Andersen	(United States) Greg Hancock	results
6	August 1	(Latvia) Daugavpils , Latvia; Latvijas Spīdveja Centrs	(United States) Greg Hancock	(Denmark) Kenneth Bjerre	(Poland) Tomasz Gollob	(Australia) Jason Crump	results
7	August 15	Målilla , Sweden; G&B Stadium	(Poland) Tomasz Gollob	(Australia) Jason Crump	(Denmark) Hans N. Andersen	(Denmark) Kenneth Bjerre	results
8	August 29	(Denmark) Vojens , Denmark; Speedway Center	(Sweden) Andreas Jonsson	(Poland) Rune Holta	(Denmark) Kenneth Bjerre	(Russia) Emil Sayfutdinov	results
9	September 12	(Slovenia) Krško , Slovenia; Matija Gubec Stadium	(Russia) Emil Sayfutdinov	(Poland) Rune Holta	(Poland) Tomasz Gollob	(Denmark) Nicki Pedersen	results
10	September 26	(Italy) Terenzano , Italy; Pista Olimpia Terenzano	(Poland) Tomasz Gollob	(Denmark) Hans N. Andersen	(Denmark) Nicki Pedersen	(Poland) Grzegorz Walasek	results
11	October 17	(Poland) Bydgoszcz , Poland; Stadion Polonii Bydgoszcz	(Denmark) Nicki Pedersen	(Australia) Leigh Adams	(Poland) Sebastian Ułamek	(Poland) Rune Holta	results

== Final classification ==
Qualifies for next season's Grand Prix series
Full-time Grand Prix rider
Wild card, track reserve or qualified reserve

Pos.	Rider	Points	CZE (Czech Republic)	EUR (Poland)	SWE (Sweden)	DEN (Denmark)	GBR (United Kingdom)	LAT (Latvia)	SCA (Sweden)	NOR (Denmark)	SVN (Slovenia)	ITA (Italy)	POL (Poland)
Gold	(Australia) (2) Jason Crump	159	14	22	16	22	24	10	18	8	12	4	9
Silver	(Poland) (3) Tomasz Gollob	144	7	17	7	13	9	16	22	7	12	23	11
Bronze	(Russia) (15) Emil Sayfutdinov	138	17	9	20	14	7	10	5	14	24	11	7
4	(United States) (4) Greg Hancock	121	10	16	5	14	14	20	8	10	9	7	8
5	(Sweden) (7) Andreas Jonsson	116	11	16	12	7	5	6	10	20	5	12	12
6	(Denmark) (1) Nicki Pedersen	110	12	9	13	10	8	–	7	11	10	12	18
7	(Poland) (8) Rune Holta	99	3	8	11	5	7	7	2	15	19	8	14
8	(Denmark) (12) Kenneth Bjerre	98	10	5	8	8	7	15	10	15	7	5	8
9	(Sweden) (10) Fredrik Lindgren	95	19	2	9	3	16	6	9	12	6	6	7
10	(Denmark) (5) Hans N. Andersen	91	6	6	5	6	15	9	14	4	5	18	3
11	(Australia) (6) Leigh Adams	81	13	6	3	6	3	11	5	7	9	3	15
12	(Poland) (14) Sebastian Ułamek	75	5	8	6	8	8	6	5	8	2	3	16
13	(Poland) (13) Grzegorz Walasek	66	6	5	6	7	1	6	6	7	6	13	3
14	(United Kingdom) (11) Chris Harris	62	6	5	5	5	9	5	8	1	4	11	3
15	(United Kingdom) (9) Scott Nicholls	45	4	1	1	5	6	3	5	3	7	6	4
16	(Sweden) (16) Antonio Lindbäck	27	–	–	17	–	–	–	10	–	–	–	–
17	(Denmark) (16) (19) Niels Kristian Iversen	20	–	–	–	11	–	8	–	1	–	–	–
18	(Poland) (16) Jarosław Hampel	9	–	9	–	–	–	–	–	–	–	–	–
19	(Slovenia) (16) Matej Žagar	7	–	–	–	–	–	–	–	–	7	–	–
20	(Russia) (16) Grigory Laguta	6	–	–	–	–	–	6	–	–	–	–	–
21	(Poland) (16) Adrian Miedziński	6	–	–	–	–	–	–	–	–	–	–	6
22	(United Kingdom) (16) Edward Kennett	4	–	–	–	–	4	–	–	–	–	–	–
23	(Italy) (16) Guglielmo Franchetti	2	–	–	–	–	–	–	–	–	–	2	–
24	(Czech Republic) (16) Matěj Kůs	1	1	–	–	–	–	–	–	–	–	–	–
25	(Italy) (17) Mattia Carpanese	0	–	–	–	–	–	–	–	–	–	0	–
Rider(s) not classified
	(Czech Republic) (17) Luboš Tomíček, Jr.	—	ns	–	–	–	–	–	–	–	–	–	–
	(Poland) (17) Damian Baliński	—	–	ns	–	–	–	–	–	–	–	–	–
	(Sweden) (17) Ricky Kling	—	–	–	ns	–	–	–	–	–	–	–	–
	(Denmark) (17) Patrick Hougaard	—	–	–	–	ns	–	–	–	–	–	–	–
	(United Kingdom) (17) Tai Woffinden	—	–	–	–	–	ns	–	–	–	–	–	–
	(Latvia) (17) Maksims Bogdanovs	—	–	–	–	–	–	ns	–	–	–	–	–
	(Sweden) (17) Simon Gustafsson	—	–	–	–	–	–	–	ns	–	–	–	–
	(Denmark) (17) Kenneth Hansen	—	–	–	–	–	–	–	–	ns	–	–	–
	(Slovenia) (17) Izak Šantej	—	–	–	–	–	–	–	–	–	ns	–	–
	(Poland) (17) Grzegorz Zengota	—	–	–	–	–	–	–	–	–	–	–	ns
	(Czech Republic) (18) Adrian Rymel	—	ns	–	–	–	–	–	–	–	–	–	–
	(Poland) (18) Janusz Kołodziej	—	–	ns	–	–	–	–	–	–	–	–	–
	(Sweden) (18) Thomas H. Jonasson	—	–	–	ns	–	–	–	–	–	–	–	–
	(Denmark) (18) Nicolai Klindt	—	–	–	–	ns	–	–	–	–	–	–	–
	(United Kingdom) (18) Simon Stead	—	–	–	–	–	ns	–	–	–	–	–	–
	(Latvia) (18) Vjačeslavs Giruckis	—	–	–	–	–	–	ns	–	–	–	–	–
	(Sweden) (18) Ludvig Lindgren	—	–	–	–	–	–	–	ns	–	–	–	–
	(Denmark) (18) Morten Risager	—	–	–	–	–	–	–	–	ns	–	–	–
	(Slovenia) (18) Aleksander Čonda	—	–	–	–	–	–	–	–	–	ns	–	–
	(Italy) (18) Andrea Maida	—	–	–	–	–	–	–	–	–	–	ns	–
	(Poland) (18) Krzysztof Buczkowski	—	–	–	–	–	–	–	–	–	–	–	ns
Pos.	Rider	Points	CZE (Czech Republic)	EUR (Poland)	SWE (Sweden)	DEN (Denmark)	GBR (United Kingdom)	LAT (Latvia)	SCA (Sweden)	NOR (Denmark)	SVN (Slovenia)	ITA (Italy)	POL (Poland)

== See also ==
- motorcycle speedway
