= Vjačeslavs Giruckis =

Latvian speedway rider

- Born: February 15, 1989 (age 37); Daugavpils, Latvia
- Nationality: Latvia

Career history
- 2005-: Daugavpils

Vjačeslavs Giruckis (born 15 February 1989) is a former motorcycle speedway rider from Latvia, who rode for Lokomotiv Daugavpils.

== Speedway Grand Prix results ==
2009 SGP
	Grand Prix	Pos.	Pts.	Heats	Draw
—	(Latvia) Daugavpils	18			18

permanent speedway rider
wild card, track reserve or qualified reserve
rider not classified (track reserve who did not start)

== Career details ==
=== World Championships ===
- Individual World Championship (Speedway Grand Prix)
  - 2009 - notclassify (track reserve at Latvian SGP)
- Team World Championships (Speedway World Team Cup and Speedway World Cup)
  - 2007 - 3rd place in Qualifying round 1
  - 2008 - 3rd place in Qualifying round 1
  - 2009 - 2nd place in Qualifying round 2
- Individual U-21 World Championship
  - 2007 - 16th place in Qualifying Round 3
  - 2009 - (Croatia) Goričan - 15th place (2 pts)

=== European Championships ===
- European Pairs Championship
  - 2008 - (Austria) Natschbach-Loipersbach - 5th (11 pts)
- European Club Champions' Cup
  - 2009 - 3rd place in the Semi-Final
  - 2009 - 4th place in the Semi-Final
- Team U-19 European Championship
  - 2008 - 3rd place in Semi-Final 2

=== Domestic competitions ===
- Team Polish Championship (League)
  - 2007 - 2nd place in the Second League for Daugavpils (Average 1.333)
  - 2008 - 5th place in the First League for Daugavpils (Average 1.107)
  - 2009 - for Daugavpils

== See also ==
- Latvia national speedway team
