= Kenneth Bjerre =

Danish speedway rider

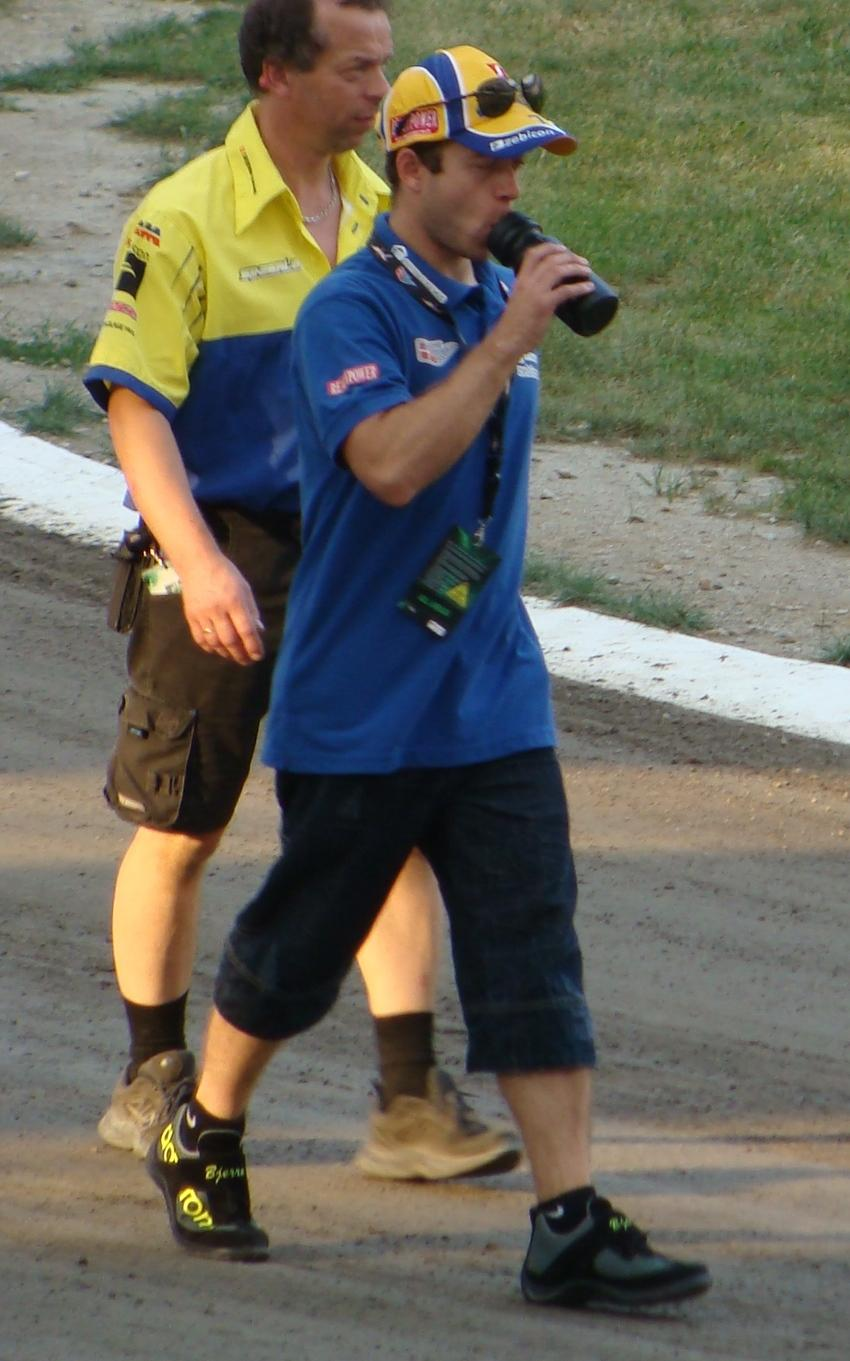
- Born: 24 May 1984 (age 42); Esbjerg, Denmark
- Nationality: Danish
- Website: Official website

Career history

Denmark
- 2000–2001: Herning
- 2007–2008: Esbjerg
- 2009: Vojens
- 2002–2006, 2010: Slangerup
- 2011–2012, 2021–2025: Grindsted
- 2013: Outrup
- 2016–2018: Holstebro
- 2019: Holsted

Great Britain
- 2002–2003: Newcastle Diamonds
- 2003, 2007–2010, 2012–2013, 2016: Peterborough Panthers
- 2004–2006, 2017, 2019: Belle Vue Aces
- 2011, 2014–2015: Kings Lynn Stars
- 2018: Leicester Lions

Poland
- 2001: Ostrów
- 2004, 2009: Gdańsk
- 2005: Gorzów
- 2006–2007, 2010–2011: Wrocław
- 2008: Rzeszów
- 2012: Częstochowa
- 2013–2014: Leszno
- 2015–2018: Tarnów
- 2019–2021: Grudziądz
- 2022–2023: Bydgoszcz
- 2024–2025: Krosno

Sweden
- 2001–2002, 2005–2007: Piraterna
- 2003, 2022: Västervik
- 2008: Masarna
- 2009: Dackarna
- 2012, 2017–2019: Indianerna
- 2013: Hammarby
- 2016: Lejonen

Speedway Grand Prix statistics
- SGP number: 7
- Starts: 47
- Finalist: 7 times
- Winner: 1 times

Individual honours
- 2019: Danish Champion
- 2000, 2003, 2004, 2005: Danish Under-21 Champion
- 2003: European Under-19 Champion
- 2008: GP Challenge winner

Team honours
- 2008: Speedway World Cup
- 2005: Elite League KO Cup Winner
- 2004: Polish Div Two Champion

Kenneth Bjerre Jensen (born 24 May 1984 in Esbjerg, Denmark) is a Danish international motorcycle speedway rider. He earned 17 caps for the Denmark national speedway team.

== Career ==
Bjerre began his Polish league career in 2001 for Ostrów. The following season, he began his career in Britain when he joined the Newcastle Diamonds for the 2002 Premier League speedway season. Over the following decade he would become a heat leader for both Belle Vue Aces (2004 to 2006) and Peterborough Panthers (2007 to 2010).

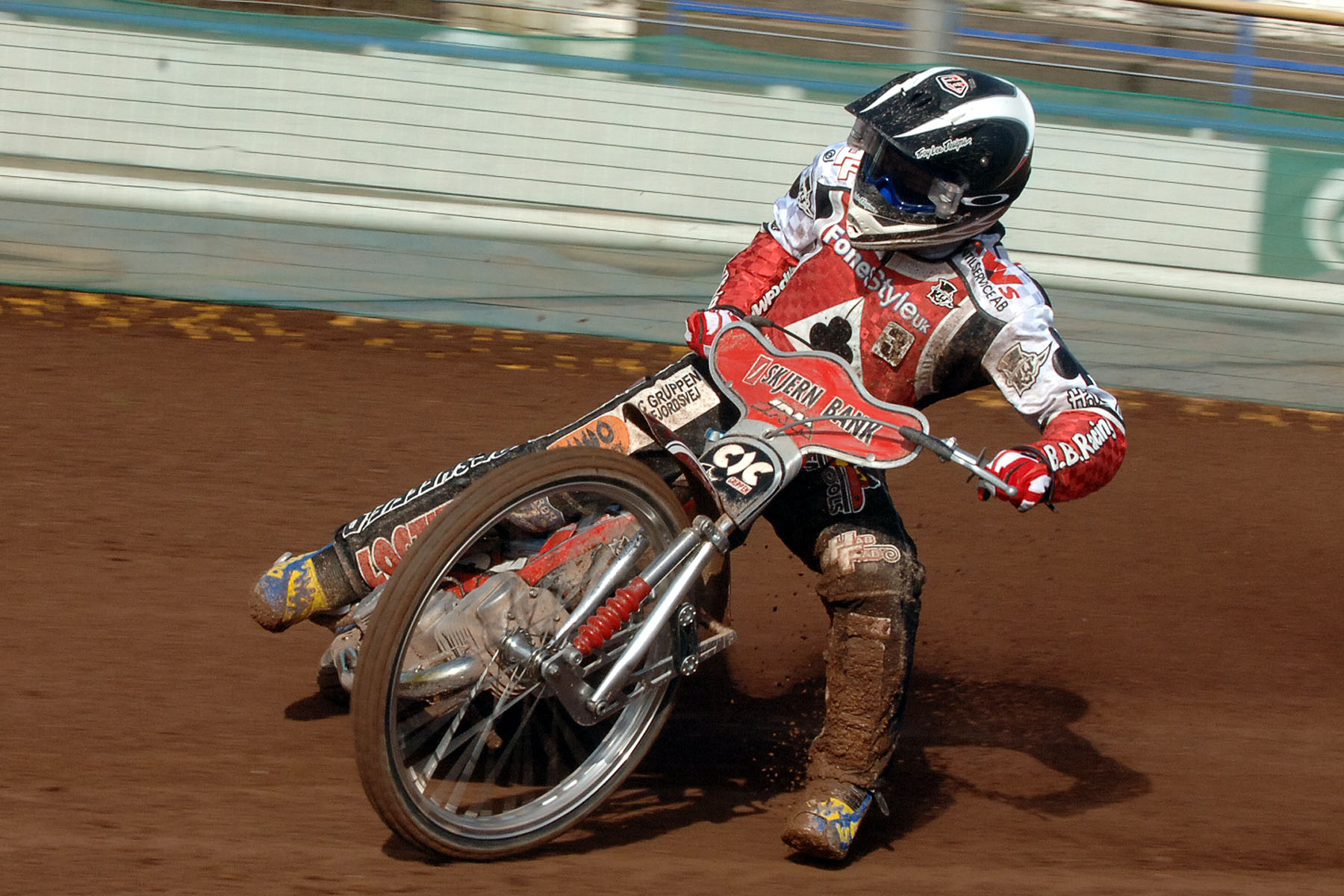
Bjerre riding for Belle Vue in 2007

In September 2008, during the Speedway Grand Prix Qualification, Bjerre won the GP Challenge, which ensured that he claimed a permanent slot for the 2009 Grand Prix.

During the 2009 Grand Prix series, Bjerre finished in eighth place, which meant that he retained a permanent rider for the 2010 Grand Prix. His consistency resulted in a seventh place finish in both the 2010 Speedway Grand Prix and 2011 Speedway Grand Prix but he dropped out of the Grand Prix after a disappointing 2012 campaign.

Bjerre raced in the United Kingdom for Peterborough Panthers and King's Lynn Stars in the Elite League.

In 2017, Bjerre raced for the Belle Vue and averaged 8.95. The following year, he appeared for Leicester Lions before going back to Belle Vue for the 2019 season, in which he became the champion of Denmark after winning the 2019 Danish Individual Speedway Championship.

== Personal life ==
His brother, Lasse Bjerre, is also a speedway rider.

== Major results ==
=== World individual Championship ===
- 2004 Speedway Grand Prix - =24th (13pts)
- 2005 Speedway Grand Prix - 17th (12pts)
- 2006 Speedway Grand Prix - =26th (1pt)
- 2007 Speedway Grand Prix - 19th (10pts)
- 2008 Speedway Grand Prix - 17th (11pts)
- 2009 Speedway Grand Prix - 8th (98pts)
- 2010 Speedway Grand Prix - 7th (106pts) (including winning the Speedway Grand Prix of Sweden)
- 2011 Speedway Grand Prix - 7th (101pts)
- 2012 Speedway Grand Prix - 16th (41pts)
- 2014 Speedway Grand Prix - 13th (79pts)
- 2017 Speedway Grand Prix - 23rd (7pts)

=== World team Championships ===
- 2004 Speedway World Cup - 3rd
- 2005 Speedway World Cup - 3rd
- 2007 Speedway World Cup - 2nd
- 2008 Speedway World Cup - Winner
- 2009 Speedway World Cup - 6th
- 2010 Speedway World Cup - 2nd
- 2011 Speedway World Cup - 4th
- 2013 Speedway World Cup - 2nd
- 2015 Speedway World Cup - 2nd
- 2016 Speedway World Cup - 5th
- 2017 Speedway World Cup - 8th
- 2018 Speedway of Nations - 5th

=== Speedway Grand Prix ===
Year	Position	Points	Best Finish	Notes
2004	23rd	13	5th	Wild Card Danish Grand Prix
2005	17th	12	7th	Rode in Sweden and Slovenia
2006	27th	1	1st	One ride as track reserve

2007 Speedway Grand Prix Final Championship standings (Riding No 16)
Race no.	Grand Prix	Pos.	Pts.	Heats	Draw No
4 /11	(Denmark) Danish SGP	6	10	(1,1,2,3,2) +1	16

permanent speedway rider
wild card, track reserve or qualified reserve
rider not classified (track reserve who did not start)

== See also ==
- Denmark national speedway team
- List of Speedway Grand Prix riders
