= Scott Nicholls =

British motorcycle speedway rider

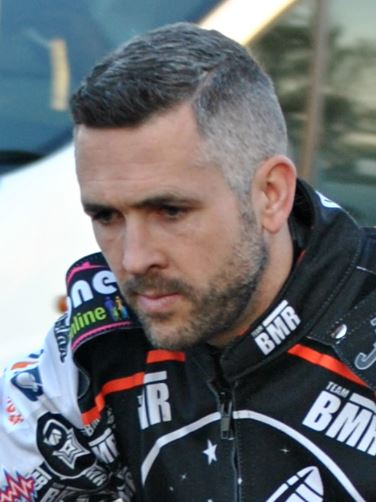
- Nicholls in 2017
- Born: 16 May 1978 (age 48); Ipswich, England
- Nationality: British (English)
- Website: www.nichollsracing.com

Career history

Great Britain
- 1994, 2018–2022: Peterborough Panthers
- 1995–1998, 2001–2003, 2009–2010 2026: Ipswich Witches
- 1999–2000: Poole Pirates
- 2004–2007, 2009, 2012–2013: Coventry Bees
- 2008: Eastbourne Eagles
- 2011: Swindon Robins
- 2014–2016: Belle Vue Aces
- 2017–2018: Rye House Rockets
- 2018–2019: Leicester Lions
- 2019: Wolverhampton Wolves
- 2020–2021: Kent
- 2022–2024: Oxford Cheetahs

Sweden
- 1998–2006: Smederna
- 2007–2008: Hammarby
- 2009–2010, 2012: Vargarna
- 2011: Valsarna
- 2015: Indianerna
- 2016: Piraterna

Poland
- 1999, 2011-2012: Gniezno
- 2000: Leszno
- 2001-2003, 2009: Wrocław
- 2005-2006: Tarnów
- 2007-2008, 2014, 2016: Rzeszów
- 2010: Miskolc
- 2013: Grudziądz
- 2015: Ostrów
- 2017: Kraków
- 2023: Rawicz

Denmark
- 2013: Munkebo

Germany
- 2010: MC Gustrow

Czech Republic
- 2013: Pardubice

Speedway Grand Prix statistics
- SGP number: 9
- Starts: 67
- Podiums: 5 (0–4–1)
- Finalist: 9 times

Individual honours
- 1998, 1999: British Under-21 Champion
- 2002, 2003, 2005, 2006, 2008, 2011, 2012: British Champion
- 2005: Golden Helmet of Pardubice (CZE)
- 2021: Olympique

Team honours
- 1998, 2005, 2007, 2021: Elite League/Premiership Champion
- 1998, 2006, 2007, 2008: Elite League KO Cup Winner
- 1998, 2007: Craven Shield Winner
- 2019: SGB Championship
- 2018: SGB Championship Fours

Scott Karl Nicholls (born 16 May 1978) is an English motorcycle speedway rider, who has won the British Championship seven times, and was a full participant in the Speedway Grand Prix series between 2002 and 2008. He earned 8 international caps for the England national speedway team and 27 caps for the Great Britain team. He is also a speedway commentator.

== Career ==
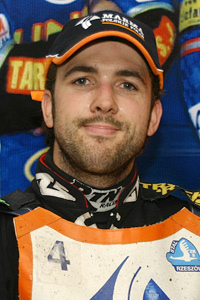
Nicholls in 2007

Born in Ipswich, Nicholls began his speedway career in grasstrack racing becoming National Schoolboy champion in 1993. His first international appearance came in 1996 when he was selected to ride for Great Britain in the Speedway World Cup final. He then became British Under-21 Champion in 1998 and again in 1999.

Nicholls' first experience of the Speedway Grand Prix series came with a wild card ride in Britain, with similar rides following in 2000 and 2001. He qualified as a full-time Grand Prix rider in 2002 and capped that season with a second place in the season ending event in Australia. That year he also won the first of his six British Championships. His sixth British Championship win occurred in 2011.

Nicholls was the most successful ever Coventry Bees captain, skippering them to five trophies in three seasons between 2004 and 2007, including two Elite League championships. He rode for Eastbourne Eagles in 2008. Despite quitting the British Elite League to reduce his racing schedule in 2009, Nicholls returned to the Coventry Bees in May 2009 as temporary cover for the injured Olly Allen.

Nicholls led his home club, the Ipswich Witches for the 2010 Elite League season, as well as riding for Vargarna in the Swedish league and Miskolc, a Hungarian team in the Polish league. With Ipswich dropping down a division, Nicholls signed for Swindon Robins for 2011. After an unsuccessful spell with the Robins, Nicholls returned to parent club Coventry Bees for the 2012 season, in which he won the Olympique individual meeting at Monmore Green Stadium, staying with the Bees in 2013.

From 2013, Nicholls made himself unavailable for the Great Britain team, but reversed his decision in 2016. He signed to ride for Belle Vue Aces in 2014 and extended his contract in 2015.

After spending 2017 with Rye House Rockets, Nicholls started the 2018 SGB Premiership season with them, and rode for Peterborough Panthers in the SGB Championship. He was part of the Peterborough team that won the SGB Championship Fours, which was held on 1 July 2018, at the Media Prime Arena. The Rockets folded mid-season in 2019, but he was signed by Leicester Lions, with whom he stayed with for the remainder of the 2019 season and helped them win the SGB Championship 2019.

After the COVID-19 pandemic affected the 2020 season, Nicholls won the league title with Peterborough for the 2021 season. During the latter part of the 2021 season he also won the Olympique.

Nicholls was appointed captain of the Oxford Cheetahs for the SGB Championship 2022 season. The Cheetahs were returning to action after a 14-year absence from British Speedway. In addition he rode for Peterborough in the SGB Premiership 2022.

Nicholls remained with the Oxford Cheetahs for the SGB Championship 2023 and SGB Championship 2024 seasons.

== Major results ==
=== World individual Championship ===
- 1999 Speedway Grand Prix - 27th (3 pts)
- 2001 Speedway Grand Prix - 33rd (4 pts)
- 2002 Speedway Grand Prix - 13th (72 pts)
- 2003 Speedway Grand Prix - 7th (102 pts)
- 2004 Speedway Grand Prix - 12th (66 pts)
- 2005 Speedway Grand Prix - 9th (72 pts)
- 2006 Speedway Grand Prix - 11th (83 pts)
- 2007 Speedway Grand Prix - 8th (91pts)
- 2008 Speedway Grand Prix - 9th (77 pts)
- 2009 Speedway Grand Prix - 15th (45 pts)
- 2010 Speedway Grand Prix - 24th (4 pts)
- 2011 Speedway Grand Prix - 20th (5 pts)
- 2012 Speedway Grand Prix - 24th (7 pts)

=== Speedway Grand Prix results ===
Year	Position	Points	Best finish	Notes
1999	27th	3	19th	A single wild card ride in Coventry
2001	33rd	4	17th	Wild card ride in Cardiff
2002	13th	72	2nd	First podium in Australia (2nd place)
2003	7th	102	2nd	Second in Sweden
2004	12th	66	6th	Missed Czech GP through injury
2005	9th	72	5th	
2006	11th	83	2nd	Missed Czech GP through injury, 2nd in Italy
2007	8th	91	2nd	Finished 2nd in Slovenia, qualified for 2008 GPs after a race-off
2008	9th	77	4th	

== World team Championships ==
- 2003 Speedway World Cup - 5th
- 2004 Speedway World Cup - silver medal
- 2005 Speedway World Cup - 4th
- 2006 Speedway World Cup - bronze medal
- 2007 Speedway World Cup - 4th
- 2008 Speedway World Cup - 5th
- 2010 Speedway World Cup - 4th
- 2011 Speedway World Cup - 6th
- 2012 Speedway World Cup - 5th

== Commentary ==
Nicholls was the lead on-track commentator for the 2022 Speedway Grand Prix and 2023 Speedway Grand Prix series.

== See also ==
- List of Speedway Grand Prix riders
