= Matěj Kůs =

Czech Republic speedway rider

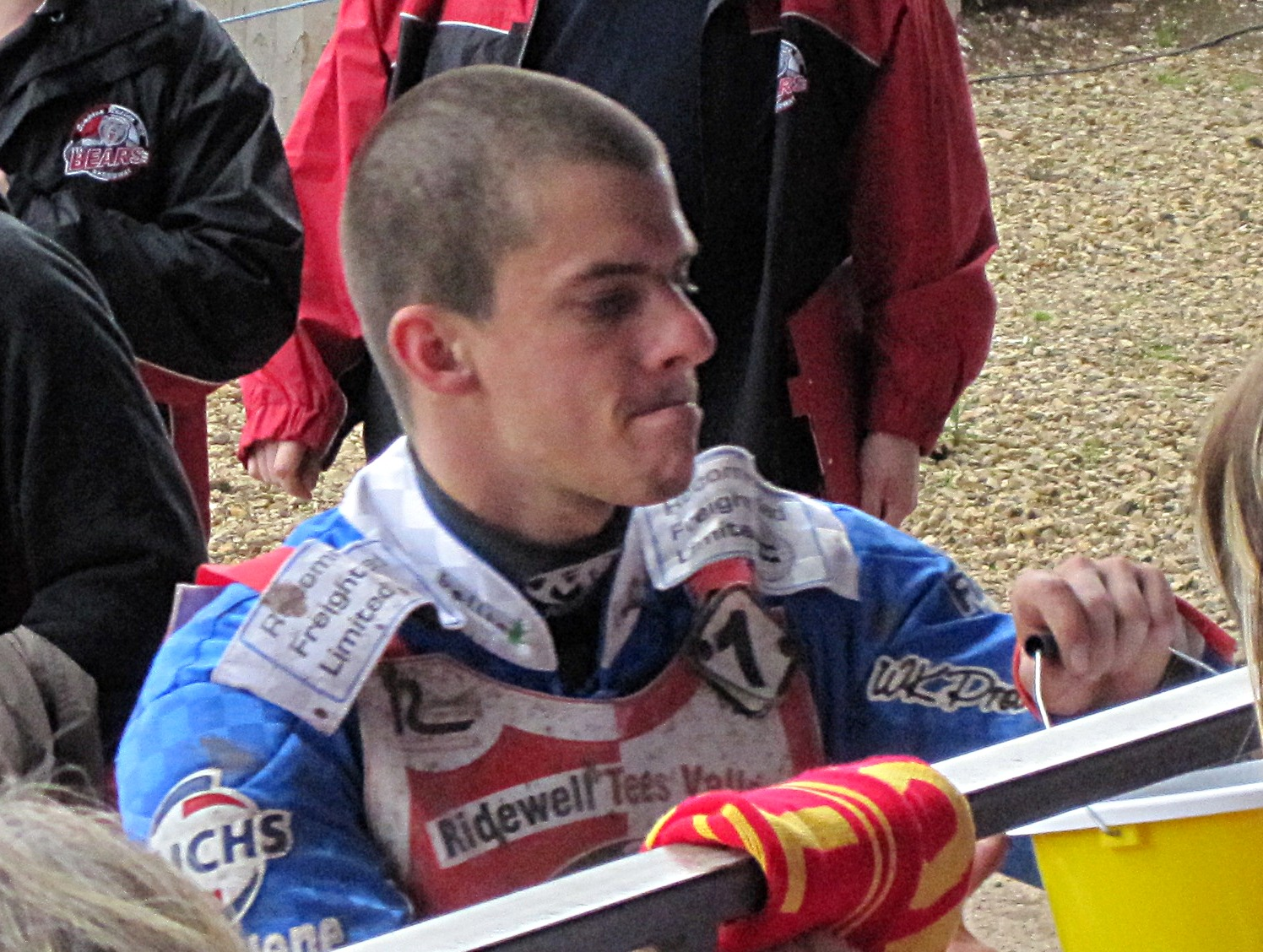
- Born: 11 July 1989 (age 37); Plzeň, Czechoslovakia
- Nickname: Matty, Magicman or KusKus
- Nationality: Czech

Career history

Czech Republic
- 2005–2009, 2011, 2013, 2015: Olmp/Marketa Praha
- 2007: Liberec

Great Britain
- 2007, 2014: Berwick Bandits
- 2011-2013, 2015, 2018: Redcar Bears
- 2016: Newcastle Diamonds

Poland
- 2007: Lublin
- 2008: Rivne
- 2009, 2013: Toruń
- 2010: Gdańsk
- 2012-2013, 2019: Kraków
- 2014-2015: Gniezno

Denmark
- 2008: Slangerup
- 2011: Fjelsted

Sweden
- 2010: Valsarna

Individual honours
- 2010: Czech Republic Speedway Championship

Matěj Kůs (born 11 July 1989) is a former international motorcycle speedway rider from the Czech Republic. He is a Czech Republic national champion and earned ten international caps for the Czech Republic national speedway team.

== Career ==
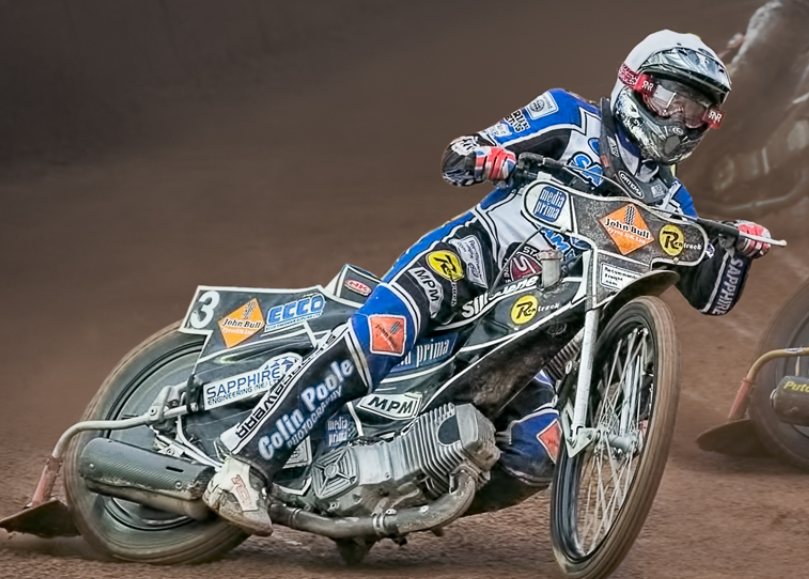
Kůs in 2016, riding for Newcastle

Kůs represented the Czech Republic national speedway team and was named 3 times as Speedway Grand Prix Wild Card in Prague. He became a full Czech international representative rider when he was selected for the Speedway World Cup first time in 2008. Kus is supported by Centrum Sportu Ministerstva Vnitra of the Czech Republic.

Kůs began his British league career in 2007, when he rode for Berwick Bandits. In 2007, Kůs was racing for the Berwick Bandits, when a crash left him unconscious for 45 minutes. When he awoke he was suffering from amnesia and reportedly spoke perfect English, a sudden and unexplained knowledge of the English language, a phenomenon known as xenoglossy. As Kůs had just begun to study the English language, his team members were shocked to hear him speaking the language perfectly. However, the effect did not last long and Kůs had no recollection of the incident after two days.

Kůs returned to Britain for the 2011 season after signing for the Redcar Bears and spent the next three seasons with the club. In 2013, he received a 28 day ban in Britain following his failure to ride in a British league fixture.

In 2014, Kůs rode for Berwick Bandits returning to his parent club Redcar Bears in 2015. Newcastle Diamonds speedway bought him in 2016 and paid the transfer fee to Redcar Bears. In 2017, he started well after winning the first meeting of the season in Lonigo (Italy), but he was injured the following week and badly broke his foot in Poland. Kus missed most of the rest of the 2017 season because of the injury, although he managed to ride in the Speedway World Cup at King's Lynn.

Kůs' last season in Britain was riding for Redcar and Newcastle in 2018.

== See also ==
- Czech Republic national speedway team
- List of Speedway Grand Prix riders
