= Adrian Rymel =

Czech speedway rider (born 1975)

- Born: 30 October 1975 (age 51); Štramberk, Czechoslovakia
- Nationality: Czech

Career history

Czech Republic

Great Britain
- 2001–2006, 2008, 2010: Berwick
- 2005: Coventry
- 2009: Workington

Poland
- 1999: Świętochłowice
- 2000, 2006: Krosno
- 2007: Grudziądz
- 2008–2009: Miskolc
- 2010: Motor Lublin

Individual honours
- 2010: Argentinian Champion

Team honours
- 2002, 2009: Premier League Four-Team Championship

Adrian Rymel (born 30 October 1975 in Štramberk, Czechoslovakia) is a former motorcycle speedway rider from the Czech Republic. He earned eight international caps for the Czech Republic national speedway team.

== Career ==
Rymel started his British speedway career when he signed for Berwick Bandits for the 2001 Premier League speedway season, signing alongside fellow Czechs Michal Makovský and Josef Franc. The following in 2002, he was part of the Berwick four that won the Premier League Four-Team Championship, which was held on 21 July 2002, at Brandon Stadium.

Rymel would stay with Berwick for eight different seasons until the end of the 2010 season. In between, in 2009, he rode for Workington Comets and was part of the Workington four who won the Premier League Four-Team Championship, held on 25 July 2009, at Derwent Park.

In 2010, Rymel won the Argentine Championship.

In January 2011, Rymel retired from speedway following a crash which damaged his neck.

== Speedway Grand Prix results ==
2006 Speedway Grand Prix Final Championship standings (Riding No 16)
Race no.	Grand Prix	Pos.	Pts.	Heats	Draw No
8 /10	(Czech Republic) Czech Rep. SGP	16	2	(1,1,0,0,X)	6

permanent speedway rider
wild card, track reserve or qualified reserve
rider not classified (track reserve who did not start)

== Honours ==
- Individual World Championship (Speedway Grand Prix):
  - 2006 - 25th place (2 points - one wild card)
- Team World Championship (Speedway World Cup):
  - 1998 - 10 points in Group A
  - 2005 - 4th place in Race-Off (4 points)
  - 2006 - 4th place in Semi-Final 2 (4 points)
  - 2008 - 7th place (6 points in Event 2)
- Individual European Championship
  - 2008 - 8th place in Semi-Final 1 (8 points)
- European Pairs Championship:
  - 2006 - 4th place (13 points)
- European Club Champions' Cup:
  - 1998 - silver medal (7 points)
  - 1999 - 4th place (1 point)
  - 2007 - 4th place (7 points)
- Argentinian Champion
  - 2009-2010 - 1st place (163 points)

== See also ==
- Czech Republic speedway team
- List of Speedway Grand Prix riders
