= 2006 Elite League speedway season =

British motorcycle speedway season

- League: Sky Sports Elite League
- Champions: Peterborough Panthers
- Knockout Cup: Coventry Bees
- Craven Shield: Poole Pirates
- Elite Shield: Coventry Bees
- Individual: Jason Crump
- Pairs: Belle Vue Aces
- Highest average: Jason Crump
- Division/s below: Premier League; Conference League

The 2006 Elite League speedway season was the 72nd season of the top division of speedway in the United Kingdom and governed by the Speedway Control Board (SCB), in conjunction with the British Speedway Promoters' Association (BSPA).

== Season summary ==
In 2006, the league consisted of eleven teams, after the newly named Reading Bulldogs, moved up from the Premier League. The Championship was won by the Peterborough Panthers by a single race point in the play-off final.

Peterborough and Reading battled each other throughout the season finishing level on points in the regular season table before Peterborough edged Reading in the Play off final. Peterborough had a strong all round squad and included Danish trio of Hans Andersen, Jesper Jensen and Niels Kristian Iversen, in addition to Australian Ryan Sullivan. Reading who had come up from the division below had recruited Greg Hancock as their main heat leader who finished 7th in the league averages which were headed once again by Australian stars Jason Crump and Leigh Adams.

== Final table ==
			Home			Away						Bonus		
Pos	Team	M	W	D	L	W	D	L	F	A	Pts	W	L	Tot
1	Peterborough Panthers	40	18	0	2	6	0	14	1942	1731	48	16	4	64
2	Reading Bulldogs	40	16	0	4	9	1	10	1934	1756	51	13	7	64
3	Swindon Robins	40	19	0	1	4	1	15	1893	1786	47	14	6	61
4	Coventry Bees	40	18	1	1	5	0	15	1856	1835	47	11	9	58
5	Belle Vue Aces	40	19	0	1	2	0	18	1880	1761	42	15	5	57
6	Wolverhampton Wolves	40	16	1	3	4	1	15	1827	1840	42	10	10	52
7	Poole Pirates	40	18	0	2	1	0	19	1880	1806	38	13	6	51
8	Ipswich Witches	40	17	0	3	2	0	18	1847	1837	38	8	12	46
9	Eastbourne Eagles	40	17	1	2	3	0	17	1791	1860	41	5	15	46
10	Oxford Cheetahs	40	11	0	9	1	0	19	1696	1989	24	2	18	26
11	Arena Essex Hammers	40	11	0	9	0	0	20	1658	2003	22	3	17	25

= Qualified for Play Off finals

=== 'A' Fixtures ===
Home \ Away	AE	BV	COV	EAS	IPS	OX	PET	PP	RB	SWI	WOL
Arena Essex Hammers		48–41	46–43	40–52	49–41	39–53	42–48	55–40	58–33	50–40	46–44
Belle Vue Aces	46–44		58–37	48–42	48–42	56–38	50–40	53–37	51–39	55–41	54–39
Coventry Bees	47–43	49–42		56–40	48–45	50–42	48–44	47–42	42–48	51–43	53–40
Eastbourne Eagles	62–32	48–42	47–41		51–39	60–32	47–46	49–41	42–48	41–55	46–44
Ipswich Witches	50–42	53–42	51–42	57–38		60–30	48–42	50–40	43–47	48–45	50–42
Oxford Cheetahs	64–26	43–50	47–43	42–48	42–51		42–47	50–43	50–44	47–43	41–51
Peterborough Panthers	56–39	46–44	62–32	59–33	55–38	63–31		48–42	41–52	55–40	54–38
Poole Pirates	59–33	55–38	55–38	54–36	57–39	55–40	48–42		45–48	48–42	47–43
Reading Bulldogs	50–46	52–43	41–49	61–34	50–40	67–28	39–51	50–40		46–44	43–47
Swindon Robins	53–38	50–43	56–39	51–39	53–40	56–38	58–34	52–43	44–49		52–42
Wolverhampton Wolves	56–36	46–44	53–40	48–45	56–35	53–37	48–42	52–41	47–44	44–46	

Legend: Blue = home team win; Yellow = draw; Red = away team win.

=== 'B' Fixtures ===
Home \ Away	AE	BV	COV	EAS	IPS	OX	PET	PP	RB	SWI	WOL
Arena Essex Hammers		39–56	44–46	48–42	42–48	62–32	58–38	50–40	41–51	43–46	44–46
Belle Vue Aces	51–42		49–41	44–30	51–39	53–39	52–43	42–48	59–34	43–30	61–35
Coventry Bees	65–29	49–44		56–39	46–44	54–38	49–47	49–42	47–46	45–45	51–42
Eastbourne Eagles	53–41	42–36	47–46		54–39	50–45	55–35	53–41	46–44	53–43	45–45
Ipswich Witches	57–37	52–43	44–50	42–48		52–43	51–43	52–44	56–38	56–37	53–43
Oxford Cheetahs	55–37	46–44	44–51	50–42	46–44		41–49	49–47	39–54	48–47	44–46
Peterborough Panthers	62–28	55–39	49–41	61–32	50–40	55–34		47–46	43–49	53–37	47–42
Poole Pirates	66–24	50–44	47–46	49–44	54–36	49–42	36–56		47–43	58–36	59–34
Reading Bulldogs	60–33	55–40	44–46	54–41	57–38	50–42	51–42	53–41		57–35	58–37
Swindon Robins	57–36	51–42	53–40	58–32	57–38	52–38	47–46	49–44	53–40		47–43
Wolverhampton Wolves	54–40	52–39	53–43	47–43	47–46	46–44	44–46	52–40	45–45	41–49	

Legend: Blue = home team win; Yellow = draw; Red = away team win.

== Play-offs ==
Semi-final decided over one leg. Grand Final decided by aggregate scores over two legs.

Semi-finals

- Peterborough Panthers 52-40 Coventry Bees
- Reading Bulldogs 51-43 Swindon Robins

Final

First leg

2 October 2006

Reading Bulldogs Charlie Gjedde 13 Greg Hancock 12 Janusz Kołodziej 8 Travis McGowan 6 Zdeněk Simota 6 Mark Lemon 4 R/R	49 - 47	Peterborough Panthers Ryan Sullivan 15 Hans N. Andersen 14 Piotr Świderski 8 Richard Hall 6 Ulrich Østergaard 3 Jesper B. Jensen 1 Niels Kristian Iversen R/R

Smallmead Stadium

Second leg

9 October 2006

Peterborough Panthers Hans N. Andersen 14 Ryan Sullivan 12 Richard Hall 10 Niels Kristian Iversen 5 Piotr Świderski 4 Jesper B. Jensen 2 Ulrich Østergaard 1	48 - 45	Reading Bulldogs Mark Lemon 12 Greg Hancock 11 Janusz Kołodziej 9 Travis McGowan 7 Charlie Gjedde 4 Zdeněk Simota 2 R/R

East of England Showground

The Peterborough Panthers were declared League Champions, winning on aggregate 95-94.

== Elite League Knockout Cup ==
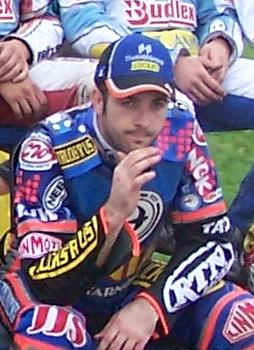
Scott Nicholls helped Coventry win the Knockout Cup

The 2006 Elite League Knockout Cup was the 68th edition of the Knockout Cup for tier one teams. Coventry Bees were the winners of the competition.

First round

Date	Team one	Score	Team two
13/04	Swindon	40-50	Reading
10/04	Reading	47-43	Swindon
06/04	Peterborough	57-37	Arena Essex
03/04	Wolverhampton	54-40	Oxford
31/03	Arena Essex	59-35	Peterborough
29/03	Oxford	43-47	Wolverhampton

Quarter-finals

Date	Team one	Score	Team two
10/07	Belle Vue	56-38	Arena Essex
07/07	Arena Essex	44-46	Belle Vue
07/07	Coventry	56-40	Ipswich
07/07	Reading	51-42	Poole
05/07	Poole	58-34	Reading
03/07	Wolverhampton	41-51	Eastbourne
01/07	Eastbourne	55-38	Wolverhampton
01/06	Ipswich	48-42	Coventry

Semi-finals

Date	Team one	Score	Team two
29/09	Coventry	61-31	Eastbourne
28/09	Poole	43-34	Belle Vue
16/09	Eastbourne	46-44	Coventry
11/09	Belle Vue	53-41	Poole

Final

First leg

9 October 2006

Belle Vue Aces Jason Crump 14 Kenneth Bjerre 9 Simon Stead 9 Phil Morris 7 Tom P. Madsen 3 James Wright 3 R/R	45 - 45	Coventry Bees Scott Nicholls 13 Martin Smolinski 8 Rory Schlein 8 Chris Harris7 Emil Kramer 3 Billy Janniro 2 Oliver Allen 2

Belle Vue Stadium

Second leg

13 October 2006

Coventry Bees Chris Harris 12 Scott Nicholls 9 Martin Smolinski 9 Rory Schlein 8 Troy Batchelor 8 Billy Janniro]5 Oliver Allen 5	56 - 40	Belle Vue Aces Jason Crump 15 Simon Stead 12 Davey Watt 5 James Wright 4 Phil Morris 1 Joel Parsons 1 R/R

Brandon Stadium

The Coventry Bees were declared Knockout Cup Champions, winning on aggregate 101-85.

== Craven Shield ==
- End of season competition for the highest nine league teams

First Round

Team one	Team two	Team three	Score
Wolverhampton	Eastbourne	Ipswich	33–38–37
Ipswich	Eastbourne	Wolverhampton	46–38–23
Eastbourne	Ipswich	Wolverhampton	42–33–33

Team one	Team two	Team three	Score
Swindon	Poole	Reading	36–35–37
Poole	Reading	Swindon	41–29–37
Reading	Poole	Swindon	37–40–31

Team one	Team two	Team three	Score
Coventry	Belle Vue	Peterborough	42–40–26
Peterborough	Belle Vue	Coventry	45–26–37
Belle Vue	Coventry	Peterborough	41–34–33

Final

Team one	Team two	Team three	Score
Coventry	Eastbourne	Poole	38–29–41
Eastbourne	Coventry	Poole	35–38–35
Poole	Eastbourne	Coventry	38–29–41

== Riders' Championship ==
Jason Crump won the Riders' Championship for the third time. The final was held at Wimborne Road on 1 October.

Pos.	Rider	Pts	Total	SF	Final
1	(Australia) Jason Crump	3 3 3 3 3	15	x	3
2	(Denmark) Nicki Pedersen	3 2 3 3 2	13	x	2
3	(United States) Greg Hancock	2 2 3 2 3	12	3	1
4	(England) Scott Nicholls	2 3 1 2 2	10	2	0
5	(Denmark) Hans Andersen	1 1 3 1 3	9	1	
6	(Australia) Todd Wiltshire	3 0 2 2 2	9	0	
7	(Australia) Leigh Adams	0 3 2 3 0	8		
8	(United States) Billy Hamill	1 2 1 1 3	8		
9	(Australia) Rory Schlein	2 2 1 1 1	7		
10	(Australia) Adam Shields	1 1 2 2 1	7		
11	(Australia) Craig Boyce	0 0 0 3 2	5		
12	(Poland) Krzysztof Kasprzak	0 3 1 - -	4		
13	(England) Simon Stead	3 0 0 0 1	4		
14	(Denmark) Jesper B. Monberg	0 1 2 1 0	4		
15	(England) Mark Loram	2 1 - - -	3		
16	(Sweden) Mikael Max	1 0 0 0 1	2		
17	(England) Matt Bates (res)	0 0 0 0	0		

== Pairs ==
The Elite League Pairs Championship was held in Swindon on 4 June and was won by Belle Vue Aces.

Group A
Pos	Team	Pts	Riders
1	Swindon	31	Adams 20, Ulamek 11
2	Peterborough	26	Andersen 15, Iversen 11
3	Eastbourne	25	Pedersen N 15, Norris 10
4	Coventry	22	Nicholls 11, Schlein 11
6	Ipswich	17	Protasiewicz 10, Jansson 7
5	Wolves	13	Lindgren 11, Correy 2

Group B
Pos	Team	Pts	Riders
1	Belle Vue	21	Crump 16, Stead 5
2	Poole	21	Lindback 12, Pedersen B 9
3	Reading	19	Hancock 10, Zagar 9
4	Oxford	15	Wiltshire 13, Skornicki 2
5	Arena Essex	14	Kylmakorpi 12, Lanham 2

Final

- Swindon 5 Belle Vue 4 - Adams, Crump, Stead, Ulamek

== Leading averages ==
Rider	Team	Average
(Australia) Jason Crump	Belle Vue	11.21
(Australia) Leigh Adams	Swindon	10.47
(Denmark) Hans Andersen	Peterborough	10.40
(Sweden) Peter Karlsson	Wolverhampton	9.94
(Denmark) Nicki Pedersen	Eastbourne	9.92
(Denmark) Bjarne Pedersen	Poole	9.39
(United States) Greg Hancock	Reading	9.28
(England) Scott Nicholls	Coventry	9.05
(England) Mark Loram	Ipswich	8.92
(Denmark) Jesper B Jensen	Peterborough	8.76

== Riders & final averages ==
Arena Essex

- (Finland) Joonas Kylmäkorpi 8.08
- (Sweden) Andreas Jonsson 7.78
- (Sweden) Mikael Max 6.87
- (England) Leigh Lanham 6.70
- (Australia) Steve Johnston 6.53
- (England) Paul Hurry 6.48
- (Denmark) Henning Bager 6.41
- (United States) Brent Werner 3.77
- (Poland) Mariusz Puszakowski 3.68
- (Sweden) Andreas Messing 2.88
- (Poland) Łukasz Romanek 1.40

Belle Vue

- (Australia) Jason Crump 11.21
- (England) Simon Stead 8.08
- (England) Joe Screen 7.75
- (Denmark) Kenneth Bjerre 7.51
- (England) James Wright 4.89
- (England) Phil Morris 4.26
- (Denmark) Tom P. Madsen 3.61
- (Australia) Joel Parsons 1.90

Coventry

- (England) Scott Nicholls 9.05
- (Australia) Rory Schlein 7.93
- (England) Chris Harris 7.84
- (Poland) Jacek Rempala 7.13
- (United States) Billy Janniro 6.59
- (Germany) Martin Smolinski 6.16
- (England) Oliver Allen 5.83
- (Australia) Troy Batchelor 5.54
- (Denmark) Morten Risager 4.54
- (Poland) Paweł Hlib 4.00

Eastbourne

- (Denmark) Nicki Pedersen 9.92
- (Australia) Adam Shields 7.79
- (England) David Norris 7.66
- (England) Dean Barker 7.14
- (England) Edward Kennett 5.29
- (Australia) Kevin Doolan 5.04
- (England) Lewis Bridger 4.88
- (England) Andrew Moore 4.06
- (England) Andrew Appleton 4.00
- (Australia) Cameron Woodward 3.42

Ipswich

- (England) Mark Loram 8.92
- (Poland) Piotr Protasiewicz 8.10
- (England) Chris Louis 8.02
- (Sweden) Kim Jansson 6.50
- (Poland) Robert Miśkowiak 6.47
- (England) Danny King 5.58
- (England) Carl Wilkinson 4.09
- (Germany) Tobias Kroner 3.62
- (Czech Republic) Jan Jaroš 2.99

Oxford

- (Sweden) Tony Rickardsson 9.76 (7 matches only)
- (Australia) Todd Wiltshire 7.98
- (Australia) Davey Watt 6.97
- (Poland) Adam Skórnicki 6.61
- (England) David Howe 6.27
- (Sweden) Eric Andersson 5.10
- (Poland) Stanisław Burza 4.15
- (Czech Republic) Luboš Tomíček Jr. 4.12
- (Sweden) Freddie Eriksson 3.84
- (Poland) Adam Pietraszko 2.29

Peterborough

- (Denmark) Hans N. Andersen 10.40
- (Denmark) Jesper B. Jensen 8.76
- (Australia) Ryan Sullivan 8.23
- (Denmark) Niels Kristian Iversen 7.82
- (Poland) Karol Ząbik 5.55
- (Poland) Piotr Świderski 5.28
- (England) Richard Hall 4.72
- (Denmark) Ulrich Østergaard 4.67

Poole

- (Denmark) Bjarne Pedersen 9.39
- (Sweden) Antonio Lindbäck 8.38
- (Poland) Krzysztof Kasprzak 7.65
- (Poland) Grzegorz Walasek 7.22
- (Australia) Craig Boyce 6.09
- (Sweden) Jonas Davidsson 5.47
- (Sweden) Daniel Davidsson 4.09
- (Australia) Matthew Wethers 3.63
- (England) Shaun Tacey 2.77

Reading

- (United States) Greg Hancock 9.28
- (Slovenia) Matej Žagar 8.13
- (Poland) Janusz Kołodziej 7.60
- (Denmark) Charlie Gjedde 7.52
- (Australia) Travis McGowan 7.01
- (Australia) Mark Lemon 6.39
- (England) Andy Smith 5.52
- (Czech Republic) Zdeněk Simota 5.43

Swindon

- (Australia) Leigh Adams 10.47
- (Poland) Tomasz Chrzanowski 7.72
- (Poland) Sebastian Ułamek 7.65
- (England) Lee Richardson 7.16
- (Poland) Adrian Miedziński 5.98
- (Russia) Renat Gafurov 5.48
- (Denmark) Mads Korneliussen 4.91
- (Sweden) Sebastian Aldén 4.47
- (England) Ritchie Hawkins 3.40

Wolverhampton

- (Sweden) Peter Karlsson 9.94
- (United States) Billy Hamill 8.37
- (Sweden) Freddie Lindgren 8.12
- (United States) Ronnie Correy 5.56
- (Germany) Christian Hefenbrock 5.19
- (Sweden) Magnus Karlsson 4.71
- (Scotland) William Lawson 4.37
- (England) Ben Wilson 1.76

== See also ==
- Speedway in the United Kingdom
- List of United Kingdom Speedway League Champions
- Knockout Cup (speedway)
