= 2006 Speedway Grand Prix of Scandinavia =

Speedway Grand Prix event

- Venue: G&B Stadium
- Location: Målilla, (Sweden)
- Start date: 12 August 2006
- Competitors: 16 (2 reserves)

The 2006 Speedway Grand Prix of Scandinavia was the seventh round of the 2006 Speedway Grand Prix season (the world championship). It took place on 12 August at the G&B Stadium in Målilla, Sweden.

It was the fifth time that the Speedway Grand Prix of Scandinavia had been held.

The Grand Prix was by the Swedish rider Andreas Jonsson (his maiden career Grand Prix win).

== Grand Prix result ==
Placing	Rider	1	2	3	4	5	6	7	8	9	10	11	12	13	14	15	16	17	18	19	20	Pts	SF1	SF2	Final	GP Pts
1	(Sweden) (15) Andreas Jonsson				1			3			1						3	3				11	3		3	25
2	(Denmark) (2) Hans Andersen	3					3				2				1				3			12		2	2	20
3	(Australia) (5) Leigh Adams		2			3					3					0					3	11		3	1	18
4	(Australia) (7) Jason Crump		3					1					2	3					2			11	2		f	16
5	(United States) (13) Greg Hancock				3	1							3		3					2		12	1			12
6	(Denmark) (3) Nicki Pedersen	1						2				2				3				3		11		f		11
7	(Poland) (8) Jarosław Hampel		0						3			3			2			2				10	0			10
8	(England) (6) Scott Nicholls		1				2			2							2			1		8		x		8
9	(Denmark) (1) Bjarne Pedersen	2				2				1				2				1				8				8
10	(Denmark) (10) Niels Kristian Iversen			2			1						1			2		0				6				6
11	(Slovenia) (16) Matej Žagar				0				0	3						1			0			4				4
12	(Poland) (4) Tomasz Gollob	0							1				0				1				2	4				4
13	(Poland) (12) Piotr Protasiewicz			1					2		0			1						0		4				4
14	(England) (11) Lee Richardson			3				0		0					0						1	4				4
15	(Sweden) (14) Antonio Lindbäck				2		0					1		0							0	3				3
16	(Australia) (9) Ryan Sullivan			0		0						0					0		1			1				1
R1	(Sweden) (R1) Freddie Lindgren																					0	R1			
R2	(Sweden) (R2) Jonas Davidsson																					0	R2			

m - exclusion for exceeding two minute time allowance • t - exclusion for touching the tapes • x - other exclusion • e - retired or mechanical failure • f - fell • ns - non-starter • nc - non-classify

gate A - inside	gate B	gate C	gate D - outside
