= 2006 Speedway Grand Prix of Poland =

Speedway Grand Prix event

- Venue: Polonia Stadium
- Location: Bydgoszcz, (Poland)
- Start date: 23 September 2006
- Competitors: 16 (2 reserves)

The 2006 Speedway Grand Prix of Poland was the tenth and final round of the 2006 Speedway Grand Prix season (the world championship). It took place on 23 September at the Polonia Stadium in Bydgoszcz, Poland.

It was the 13th time that the Speedway Grand Prix of Poland had been held.

The Grand Prix was by the Danish rider Nicki Pedersen (his fourth career Grand Prix win).

== Grand Prix result ==
| Placing | Rider | 1 | 2 | 3 | 4 | 5 | 6 | 7 | 8 | 9 | 10 | 11 | 12 | 13 | 14 | 15 | 16 | 17 | 18 | 19 | 20 | Pts | SF1 | SF2 | Final | GP Pts |
|---|---|---|---|---|---|---|---|---|---|---|---|---|---|---|---|---|---|---|---|---|---|---|---|---|---|---|
| 1 | (Denmark) (14) Nicki Pedersen | | | | 3 | | 3 | | | | | 3 | | 2 | | | | | | | 3 | 14 | 3 | | 3 | 25 |
| 2 | (United States) (13) Greg Hancock | | | | 1 | 3 | | | | | | | 3 | | 3 | | | | | 2 | | 12 | | 2 | 2 | 20 |
| 3 | (Poland) (9) Tomasz Gollob | | | 2 | | 2 | | | | | | 1 | | | | | 3 | | 3 | | | 11 | 2 | | 1 | 18 |
| 4 | (Poland) (12) Wiesław Jaguś | | | 3 | | | | | 2 | | 3 | | | 2 | | | | | | 0 | | 10 | | 3 | x | 16 |
| 5 | (Sweden) (7) Andreas Jonsson | | 2 | | | | | 3 | | | | | 2 | 3 | | | | | 2 | | | 12 | | 1 | | 12 |
| 6 | (Denmark) (10) Hans Andersen | | | 1 | | | 2 | | | | | | 1 | | | 3 | | 2 | | | | 9 | 0 | | | 9 |
| 7 | (Slovenia) (5) Matej Žagar | | 3 | | | 1 | | | | | 1 | | | | | 1 | | | | | 2 | 8 | 1 | | | 8 |
| 8 | (Australia) (1) Jason Crump | 3 | | | | 0 | | | | 1 | | | | 0 | | | | 3 | | | | 7 | | 0 | | 7 |
| 9 | (England) (2) Scott Nicholls | 2 | | | | | 1 | | | | 2 | | | | 1 | | | | 1 | | | 7 | | | | 7 |
| 10 | (Denmark) (15) Bjarne Pedersen | | | | 2 | | | 2 | | | 0 | | | | | | 2 | 1 | | | | 7 | | | | 7 |
| 11 | (Australia) (3) Leigh Adams | 1 | | | | | | 0 | | | | 0 | | | | 2 | | | | 3 | | 6 | | | | 6 |
| 12 | (Poland) (11) Jarosław Hampel | | | 0 | | | | 1 | | 3 | | | | | 2 | | | | | | 0 | 6 | | | | 6 |
| 13 | (Poland) (6) Piotr Protasiewicz | | 1 | | | | 0 | | | 2 | | | | | | | 0 | | | 1 | | 4 | | | | 4 |
| 14 | (Sweden) (16) Antonio Lindbäck | | | | 0 | | | | 3 | 0 | | | | | | 0 | | | 0 | | | 3 | | | | 3 |
| 15 | (Denmark) (4) Niels Kristian Iversen | 0 | | | | | | | 1 | | | | 0 | | | | 1 | | | | 1 | 3 | | | | 3 |
| 16 | (England) (8) Lee Richardson | | 0 | | | | | | 0 | | | 2 | | | 0 | | | 0 | | | | 2 | | | | 2 |
| R1 | (Poland) (R1) Janusz Kołodziej | | | | | | | | | | | | | | | | | | | | | 0 | R1 | | | |
| R2 | (Poland) (R2) Karol Ząbik | | | | | | | | | | | | | | | | | | | | | 0 | R2 | | | |

m - exclusion for exceeding two minute time allowance • t - exclusion for touching the tapes • x - other exclusion • e - retired or mechanical failure • f - fell • ns - non-starter • nc - non-classify

| gate A - inside | gate B | gate C | gate D - outside |
