= 2006 Speedway Grand Prix of Denmark =

Speedway Grand Prix event

- Venue: Parken Stadium
- Location: Copenhagen, (Denmark)
- Start date: 24 June 2006
- Competitors: 16 (2 reserves)

The 2006 Speedway Grand Prix of Denmark was the fifth round of the 2006 Speedway Grand Prix season (the world championship). It took place on 24 June 2006 at the Parken Stadium in Copenhagen, Denmark.

It was the 12th time that the Speedway Grand Prix of Denmark had been held.

The Grand Prix was by the Danish rider Hans Andersen (his second career Grand Prix win).

== Grand Prix result ==
Placing	Rider	1	2	3	4	5	6	7	8	9	10	11	12	13	14	15	16	17	18	19	20	Pts	SF1	SF2	Final	GP Pts
1	(Denmark) (16) Hans Andersen				1				3	3						3			1			11		3	3	25
2	(Australia) (12) Jason Crump			3					1		1			2						3		10	3		2	20
3	(Denmark) (15) Bjarne Pedersen				0			2			3						1	3				9	2		1	18
4	(Sweden) (5) Antonio Lindbäck		2			2					2					2					2	10		2	x	16
5	(United States) (14) Greg Hancock				2		3					2		3							3	13	1			13
6	(Australia) (13) Leigh Adams				3	3							3		3					0		12		1		12
7	(England) (2) Lee Richardson	3					2				0				1				3			9	0			9
8	(England) (8) Scott Nicholls		3						2			1			2			0				8		0		8
9	(Denmark) (11) Niels Kristian Iversen			2				3		2					f						1	8				8
10	(Sweden) (9) Andreas Jonsson			t		0						3					2		2			7				7
11	(Denmark) (6) Nicki Pedersen		1				1			0							3			1		6				6
12	(Sweden) (3) Tony Rickardsson	2						0				0				1				2		5				5
13	(Slovenia) (1) Matej Žagar	1				t				1				1				1				4				4
14	(Poland) (10) Tomasz Gollob			0			0						1			0		2				3				3
15	(Poland) (4) Jarosław Hampel	0							0				2				0				0	2				2
16	(Poland) (7) Piotr Protasiewicz		0					1					0	0					0			1				1
R1	(Denmark) (R1) Charlie Gjedde					1																1	R1			
R2	(Denmark) (R2) Kenneth Bjerre			1																		1	R2			

m - exclusion for exceeding two minute time allowance • t - exclusion for touching the tapes • x - other exclusion • e - retired or mechanical failure • f - fell • ns - non-starter • nc - non-classify

gate A - inside	gate B	gate C	gate D - outside
