= 2006 Speedway Grand Prix of Latvia =

Speedway Grand Prix event

- Venue: Latvijas Spīdveja Centrs
- Location: Daugavpils, (Latvia)
- Start date: 9 September 2006
- Competitors: 16 (2 reserves)

The 2006 Speedway Grand Prix of Slovenia was the ninth round of the 2006 Speedway Grand Prix season (the world championship). It took place on 9 September 2006 at the Latvijas Spīdveja Centrs in Daugavpils, (Latvia)..

It was the first time that the Speedway Grand Prix of Latvia had been held.

The Grand Prix was won by the American rider Greg Hancock, his 8th career Grand Prix win.

== Grand Prix result ==
Placing	Rider	1	2	3	4	5	6	7	8	9	10	11	12	13	14	15	16	17	18	19	20	Pts	SF1	SF2	Final	GP Pts
1	(United States) (3) Greg Hancock	3						1				2				3				3		12		3	3	25
2	(Sweden) (12) Antonio Lindbäck			3					2		3			3						2		13	3		2	20
3	(Denmark) (5) Nicki Pedersen		3			3					2					2					3	13		2	1	18
4	(Sweden) (8) Andreas Jonsson		0						3			1			2			3				9	2		x	16
5	(Australia) (6) Jason Crump		2				3			3							2			1		11	0			11
6	(Slovenia) (7) Matej Žagar		1					3					3	2					2			11		1		11
7	(England) (11) Scott Nicholls			2				2		0					3						2	9	1			9
8	(Australia) (9) Leigh Adams			1		1						0					3		3			8		0		8
9	(Poland) (14) Jarosław Hampel				1		2					3		1							e	7				7
10	(Denmark) (1) Bjarne Pedersen	2				2				1				0				2				7				7
11	(Denmark) (4) Niels Kristian Iversen	0							1				1				1				1	4				4
12	(Poland) (16) Tomasz Gollob				2				0	2						0			0			4				4
13	(Poland) (2) Piotr Protasiewicz	1					0				1				1				1			4				4
14	(Denmark) (15) Hans Andersen				3			0			e						0	1				4				4
15	(Latvia) (10) Kjasts Puodžuks			f			1						2			1		0				4				4
16	(England) (13) Lee Richardson				0	0							0		ns					ns		0				0
R1	(Russia) (R1) Grigory Laguta														0							0	R1			
R2	(Latvia) (R2) Andrejs Koroļevs																			0		0	R2			

m - exclusion for exceeding two minute time allowance • t - exclusion for touching the tapes • x - other exclusion • e - retired or mechanical failure • f - fell • ns - non-starter • nc - non-classify

gate A - inside	gate B	gate C	gate D - outside
