= 2006 Speedway Grand Prix of Czech Republic =

Speedway Grand Prix event

- Venue: Markéta Stadium
- Location: Prague, (Czech Republic)
- Start date: 26 August 2006
- Competitors: 16 (2 reserves)

The 2006 Speedway Grand Prix of Czech Republic was the eighth round of the 2006 Speedway Grand Prix season (the world championship). It took place on 26 August at the Markéta Stadium in Prague, Czech Republic.

It was the tenth time that the Speedway Grand Prix of Czech Republic had been held.

The Grand Prix was by the Danish rider Hans Andersen (his third career Grand Prix win).

== Grand Prix result ==
Placing	Rider	1	2	3	4	5	6	7	8	9	10	11	12	13	14	15	16	17	18	19	20	Pts	SF1	SF2	Final	GP Pts
1	(Denmark) (7) Hans Andersen		2					2					3	2					3			12		3	3	25
2	(Slovenia) (5) Matej Žagar		3			3					2					1					1	10	2		2	20
3	(Sweden) (1) Antonio Lindbäck	3				1				1				f				3				8	3		1	18
4	(Poland) (11) Jarosław Hampel			0				3		2					0						2	7		2	x	16
5	(Australia) (14) Jason Crump				3		3					2		3							3	14	1			14
6	(Australia) (3) Leigh Adams	2						1				3				3				3		12		0		12
7	(Australia) (12) Ryan Sullivan			2					3		3			t						1		9		1		9
8	(Denmark) (10) Niels Kristian Iversen			3			2						0			2		1				8	0			8
9	(Sweden) (13) Andreas Jonsson				0	2							1		2					2		7				7
10	(Denmark) (2) Nicki Pedersen	1					t				x				3				2			6				6
11	(Poland) (4) Tomasz Gollob	0							2				2				2				0	6				6
12	(Poland) (9) Piotr Protasiewicz			1		0						1					3		0			5				5
13	(United States) (16) Greg Hancock				t				0	3						0			1			4				4
14	(England) (15) Lee Richardson				2			f			e						1	ns				3				3
15	(Czech Republic) (6) Adrian Rymel		1				1			0							0			0		2				2
16	(Denmark) (8) Bjarne Pedersen		0						1			0			1			ns				2				2
R1	(Czech Republic) (R1) Luboš Tomíček, Jr.				1									1				2				4	R1			
R2	(Czech Republic) (R2) Zdeněk Simota						0											0				0	R2			

m - exclusion for exceeding two minute time allowance • t - exclusion for touching the tapes • x - other exclusion • e - retired or mechanical failure • f - fell • ns - non-starter • nc - non-classify

gate A - inside	gate B	gate C	gate D - outside
