= Neil Street =

Australian speedway rider, manager, and engineer

- Born: 15 January 1931; Melbourne, Victoria, Australia
- Died: 6 October 2011 (aged 80); Melbourne, Victoria, Australia
- Nationality: Australian

Career history
- 1952–1955, 1966–1969: Exeter Falcons
- 1957–1963: Swindon Robins
- 1972–1976: Newport Wasps

Team honours
- 1957: National League Champion
- 1974, 1975: Spring Gold Cup
- 2001, 2002: World Team Cup as Manager
- 2002: Speedway World Cup as Manager

Neil Joseph Street OAM (15 January 1931 – 6 October 2011) was an Australian international motorcycle speedway rider, manager and engineer.

== Career ==
Street was born in Melbourne, Australia, first arrived in Britain in 1952 to ride for the Exeter Falcons.

Street rode for the Swindon Robins and the Newport Wasps before retiring from racing in 1976. He made international appearances for Australia, Australasia, Great Britain and Norway. In 2002, he was awarded the Order of Australia in the Australia Day 'Motor Sport' Awards for his services to speedway.

== Management ==
In 1981, Street was appointed team manager of the Weymouth Wildcats. When they closed in 1984, he became manager of the Poole Pirates until 1999 when he handed over to Neil Middleditch. In 1984, he was also the team manager of the Exeter Falcons. In 1997, he also took over as manager of the Newport Wasps and stayed in charge there until 2005.

Street was also manager of the Australia speedway team and was in charge when they won the World Team Cup in 1999 and the Speedway World Cup in 2001 and 2002.

== Family ==
Street's daughter Carole married motorcycle speedway rider Phil Crump and his grandson, Jason Crump, has won the World Speedway Championship three times, in 2004, 2006 and 2009.

== Engine development ==
In 1974–1975, Street became involved in designing engines. Ivan Tighe designed a four valve head for the Jawa engine, with input from Street. The engine went for manufacturing in just four weeks and was taken to Newcastle for a meeting held to be held the night before the Australian championships, but the meeting was rained off, so the engine was yet untested on the track. Phil Crump then used the engine in the Australian Championships at Sydney and took nearly three seconds off the track record held by Jim Airey. This was considered a remarkable feat considering the fact that the engine was straight from the workshop and had not been tested at a meeting. Crump had been given the option of his normal 2-valve engine, but after trying the 4-valve refused to get off the motorcycle as confirmed by Ivan Tighe.

== Death ==
Street died at home in his native Melbourne on 6 October 2011, aged 80. He had been diagnosed with cancer five years previously but kept the illness hidden from the media. His cancer spread to his leg and as a result had a fall a few weeks prior to his death and banged his head but he did not tell anyone. He was unaware that the fall had caused a brain hemorrhage and Street slipped into a coma during his sleep and died on 6 October.
