= 2004 Speedway Under-21 World Championship =

European motorcycle speedway event

World Under-21 Championship
- Venue: Olympic Stadium
- Location: Wrocław, Poland
- Start date: 11 September 2004

The 2004 Individual Speedway Junior World Championship was the 28th edition of the World motorcycle speedway Under-21 Championships.

The final was won by Robert Miśkowiak of the Poland.

== World final ==
- 11 September 2004
- (Poland) Olympic Stadium, Wrocław

Placing	Rider	Total	1	2	3	4	5	6	7	8	9	10	11	12	13	14	15	16	17	18	19	20	Pts	Pos	21	22	23
1	(Poland) (5) Robert Miśkowiak	12		3			3					3					1					2	12	2		2	3
2	(Denmark) (7) Kenneth Bjerre	8		2					E					2	1					3			8	8		3	2
3	(Slovenia) (10) Matej Žagar	8			F/X			0						3			3		2				8	6	2		1
4	(Australia) (1) Rory Schlein	8	2				1				2				0				3				8	7	3		F/X
5	(Poland) (14) Piotr Świderski	9				0		1					3		2							3	9	4	1		
6	(Germany) (11) Martin Smolinski	9			2				3		1					2						1	9	5		F/X	
7	(Poland) (12) Adrian Miedziński	13			3					3		2			3						2		13	1	E		
8	(Sweden) (16) Antonio Lindbäck	12				3				2	3						2			2			12	3		X	
9	(Poland) (8) Krzysztof Kasprzak	8		1						1			2			3			1				8	9			
10	(Sweden) (13) Fredrik Lindgren	8				1	2							1		1					3		8	10			
11	(Denmark) (15) Mads Korneliussen	7				2			2			1						2	0				7	11			
12	(Sweden) (6) Jonas Davidsson	6		0				2			0							3			1		6	12			
13	(Sweden) (3) Eric Andersson	5	3						1				1				0				E		5	13			
14	(Russia) (2) Denis Gizatullin	4	0					3				0				0				1			4	14			
15	(Germany) (4) Christian Hefenbrock	2	1							0				0				1				0	2	15			
16	(Sweden) (9) Daniel Davidsson	1			1		0						0					0		E			1	16			
R1	(Poland) (R1) Paweł Hlib	0																					0	R1			
R2	(England) (R2) Ritchie Hawkins	0																					0	R2			
Placing	Rider	Total	1	2	3	4	5	6	7	8	9	10	11	12	13	14	15	16	17	18	19	20	Pts	Pos	21	22	23

m - exclusion for exceeding two minute time allowance • t - exclusion for touching the tapes • x - other exclusion • e - retired or mechanical failure • f - fell • ns - non-starter • nc - non-classify

gate A - inside	gate B	gate C	gate D - outside
