= 1994 Speedway Under-21 World Championship =

European motorcycle speedway event

World Under-21 Championship
- Venue: Elgane
- Location: Varhaug, Norway
- Start date: 14 August 1994

The 1994 Individual Speedway Junior World Championship was the 18th edition of the World motorcycle speedway Under-21 Championships.

The final was won by Mikael Karlsson of Sweden after he defeated Rune Holta in a run-off for the title. The success meant that and he also gained qualification to 1995 Speedway Grand Prix.

== World final ==
- 14 August 1994
- (Norway) Elgane, Varhaug

| Placing | Rider | Total | 1 | 2 | 3 | 4 | 5 | 6 | 7 | 8 | 9 | 10 | 11 | 12 | 13 | 14 | 15 | 16 | 17 | 18 | 19 | 20 | Pts | Pos | 21 | 22 |
|---|---|---|---|---|---|---|---|---|---|---|---|---|---|---|---|---|---|---|---|---|---|---|---|---|---|---|
| 1 | (Sweden) (15) Mikael Karlsson | 14 | | | | 3 | | | 3 | | | 2 | | | | | | 3 | 3 | | | | 14 | 2 | | 3 |
| 2 | (Norway) (12) Rune Holta | 14 | | | 3 | | | | | 3 | | 3 | | | 2 | | | | | | 3 | | 14 | 1 | | 2 |
| 3 | (Australia) (1) Jason Crump | 12 | 2 | | | | 3 | | | | 2 | | | | 3 | | | | 2 | | | | 12 | 4 | 3 | |
| 4 | (Czech Republic) (11) Tomáš Topinka | 12 | | | 2 | | | | 1 | | 3 | | | | | 3 | | | | | | 3 | 12 | 3 | 2 | |
| 5 | (Poland) (16) Tomasz Bajerski | 11 | | | | 2 | | | | 2 | 1 | | | | | | 3 | | | 3 | | | 11 | 5 | | |
| 6 | (Denmark) (3) Ronni Pedersen | 10 | 3 | | | | | | 2 | | | | 3 | | | | 2 | | | | 0 | | 10 | 6 | | |
| 7 | (Czech Republic) (6) Jiří Štancl Jr. | 10 | | 3 | | | | 3 | | | 0 | | | | | | | 2 | | | 2 | | 10 | 7 | | |
| 8 | (Poland) (9) Grzegorz Rempała | 7 | | | 1 | | 2 | | | | | | 2 | | | | | 1 | | 1 | | | 7 | 8 | | |
| 9 | (Poland) (13) Piotr Baron | 6 | | | | 0 | 1 | | | | | | | 3 | | 1 | | | | | 1 | | 6 | 9 | | |
| 10 | (Czech Republic) (2) Antonín Šváb Jr. | 5 | 1 | | | | | 2 | | | | 0 | | | | 0 | | | | 2 | | | 5 | 10 | | |
| 11 | (England) (8) Glenn Cunningham | 5 | | 1 | | | | | | 0 | | | 1 | | | 2 | | | 1 | | | | 5 | 11 | | |
| 12 | (Hungary) (10) Gabor Röth | 3 | | | 0 | | | 0 | | | | | | 2 | | | 1 | | 0 | | | | 3 | 12 | | |
| 13 | (Germany) (7) Mirko Wolter | 2 | | 2 | | | | | F/- | | | | | - | - | | | | | - | | | 2 | 13 | | |
| 14 | (Germany) (5) Robert Kessler | 2 | | 0 | | | 0 | | | | | 1 | | | | | 0 | | | | | 1 | 2 | 14 | | |
| 15 | (Hungary) (4) Norbert Magosi | 1 | 0 | | | | | | | 1 | | | | 0 | | | | 0 | | | | 0 | 1 | 15 | | |
| 16 | (Czech Republic) (14) Marián Jirout | 0 | | | | F/- | | - | | | | | - | | - | | | | | | | - | 0 | 16 | | |
| R1 | (Sweden) (R1) Daniel Andersson | 4 | | | | 1 | | 1 | | | | | 0 | | 0 | | | | | | | 2 | 4 | R1 | | |
| R2 | (Poland) (18) Mirosław Cierniak | 2 | | | | | | | 0 | | | | | 1 | 1 | | | | | 0 | | | 2 | R2 | | |
| Placing | Rider | Total | 1 | 2 | 3 | 4 | 5 | 6 | 7 | 8 | 9 | 10 | 11 | 12 | 13 | 14 | 15 | 16 | 17 | 18 | 19 | 20 | Pts | Pos | 21 | 22 |

m - exclusion for exceeding two minute time allowance • t - exclusion for touching the tapes • x - other exclusion • e - retired or mechanical failure • f - fell • ns - non-starter • nc - non-classify

| gate A - inside | gate B | gate C | gate D - outside |
