= 2009 Mieczysław Połukard Criterium of Polish Speedway Leagues Aces =

Polish speedway event

2009 Mieczysław Połukard Criterium of Aces

The 28th Mieczysław Połukard Criterium of Polish Speedway League Aces was the 2009 version of the Criterium of Aces. It took place on 29 March at the Polonia Stadium in Bydgoszcz, Poland. In the 2008 season, Criterium was won by multi-winner Tomasz Gollob, who beat junior Emil Saifutdinov and Tomasz Chrzanowski.

== Start list ==
- (Sweden) (7) **Andreas Jonsson - Polonia Bydgoszcz**
- (Poland) Wiesław Jaguś - Unibax Toruń
- (Poland) Tomasz Gapiński - Włókniarz Częstochowa
- (Poland) Krzysztof Jabłoński - Start Gniezno
- (Russia) (15) **Emil Saifutdinov - Polonia Bydgoszcz**
- (Poland) Jarosław Hampel - Unia Leszno
- (Poland) Piotr Protasiewicz - Falubaz Zielona Góra
- (Poland) **Krzysztof Buczkowski - Polonia Bydgoszcz**
- (Poland) (8) Rune Holta - Caelum Stal Gorzów Wlkp.
- (Poland) (13) Grzegorz Walasek - Falubaz Zielona Góra
- (Poland) Krzysztof Kasprzak - Unia Leszno
- (Sweden) **Jonas Davidsson - Polonia Bydgoszcz**
- (Poland) (14) Sebastian Ułamek - Unia Tarnów
- (Poland) **Tomasz Chrzanowski - Polonia Bydgoszcz**
- (Poland) Adrian Miedziński - Unibax Toruń
- (Poland) Tomasz Jędrzejak - Atlas Wrocław

Note: riders in bold type are Polonia' riders. Riders with numbers are 2009 Speedway Grand Prix riders.

Notconfirmed:

- (Poland) (3) Tomasz Gollob - Stal Gorzów Wlkp.
- (Poland) Adam Skórnicki - Lotos Gdańsk

== Heat details ==
Placing	Rider	Total	1	2	3	4	5	6	7	8	9	10	11	12	13	14	15	16	17	18	19	20	Pts	Pos
	(Sweden) (1) Andreas Jonsson (BYD)	9	3				2				1				3				0				9	6
	(Poland) (2) Wiesław Jaguś (TOR)	7	2					0				2				1				2			7	9
	(Poland) (3) Tomasz Gapiński (CZE)	5	0						3				1				1				0		5	12
	(Poland) (4) Krzysztof Jabłoński (GNI)	3	1							0				0				1				1	3	14
	(Russia) (5) Emil Saifutdinov (BYD)	14		3			3					3					3					2	14	1
	(Poland) (6) Jarosław Hampel (LES)	11		2				1			2							3			3		11	3
	(Poland) (7) Piotr Protasiewicz (ZIE)	4		0					2					1	0					1			4	13
	(Poland) (8) Krzysztof Buczkowski (BYD)	9		1						3			3			0			2				9	7
	(Poland) (9) Rune Holta (GOR)	10			2		1						2					2		3			10	4
	(Poland) (10) Grzegorz Walasek (ZIE)	13			3			3						2			2		3				13	2
	(Poland) (11) Krzysztof Kasprzak (LES)	10			0				1		3					3						3	10	5
	(Sweden) (12) Jonas Davidsson (BYD)	6			1					2		0			2						1		6	11
	(Poland) (13) Sebastian Ułamek (TAR)	9				2	0							3		2					2		9	8
	(Poland) (14) Tomasz Chrzanowski (BYD)	1				0		0					0		1							0	1	16
	(Poland) (15) Adrian Miedziński (TOR)	7				3			2			1						0	1				7	10
	(Poland) (16) Tomasz Jędrzejak (WRO)	2				1				1	0						0			0			2	15
	(17)	0																					0	
	(18)	0																					0	
Placing	Rider	Total	1	2	3	4	5	6	7	8	9	10	11	12	13	14	15	16	17	18	19	20	Pts	Pos

m - exclusion for exceeding two minute time allowance • t - exclusion for touching the tapes • x - other exclusion • e - retired or mechanical failure • f - fell • ns - non-starter • nc - non-classify

gate A - inside	gate B	gate C	gate D - outside

== See also ==
- Speedway in Poland
