= 2006 Speedway Grand Prix of Italy =

Speedway Grand Prix event

- Venue: Santa Marina Stadium
- Location: Lonigo, (Italy)
- Start date: 29 July 2006
- Competitors: 16 (2 reserves)

The 2006 Speedway Grand Prix of Italy was the sixth round of the 2006 Speedway Grand Prix season (the world championship). It took place on 29 July 2006 at the Santa Marina Stadium in Lonigo, (Italy).

It was the third time that the Speedway Grand Prix of Italy had been held.

The Grand Prix was by the Australian rider Jason Crump (his 16th career Grand Prix win).

== Grand Prix result ==
| Placing | Rider | 1 | 2 | 3 | 4 | 5 | 6 | 7 | 8 | 9 | 10 | 11 | 12 | 13 | 14 | 15 | 16 | 17 | 18 | 19 | 20 | Pts | SF1 | SF2 | Final | GP Pts |
|---|---|---|---|---|---|---|---|---|---|---|---|---|---|---|---|---|---|---|---|---|---|---|---|---|---|---|
| 1 | (Australia) (10) Jason Crump | | | 3 | | | 2 | | | | | | 2 | | | 3 | | 3 | | | | 13 | | 2 | 3 | 25 |
| 2 | (England) (9) Scott Nicholls | | | 2 | | 1 | | | | | | 0 | | | | | 3 | | 3 | | | 9 | 2 | | 2 | 20 |
| 3 | (Denmark) (13) Hans Andersen | | | | 3 | 3 | | | | | | | 3 | | 2 | | | | | 3 | | 14 | 3 | | 1 | 18 |
| 4 | (Australia) (8) Leigh Adams | | 3 | | | | | | 2 | | | 3 | | | 1 | | | 1 | | | | 10 | | 3 | 0 | 16 |
| 5 | (Slovenia) (6) Matej Žagar | | 1 | | | | 3 | | | 3 | | | | | | | 2 | | | 1 | | 10 | f | | | 10 |
| 6 | (Denmark) (5) Bjarne Pedersen | | 2 | | | 2 | | | | | 1 | | | | | 2 | | | | | 3 | 10 | | 1 | | 10 |
| 7 | (Denmark) (16) Nicki Pedersen | | | | 2 | | | | 3 | 2 | | | | | | 1 | | | 1 | | | 9 | | 0 | | 9 |
| 8 | (United States) (2) Greg Hancock | 1 | | | | | 0 | | | | 3 | | | | 3 | | | | 2 | | | 9 | 1 | | | 9 |
| 9 | (Sweden) (14) Andreas Jonsson | | | | 1 | | 1 | | | | | 2 | | 3 | | | | | | | 2 | 9 | | | | 9 |
| 10 | (Poland) (1) Tomasz Gollob | 2 | | | | 0 | | | | 1 | | | | 2 | | | | 2 | | | | 7 | | | | 7 |
| 11 | (Denmark) (11) Niels Kristian Iversen | | | 1 | | | | 3 | | 0 | | | | | 0 | | | | | | 1 | 5 | | | | 5 |
| 12 | (Sweden) (3) Antonio Lindbäck | x | | | | | | 1 | | | | 1 | | | | 0 | | | | 2 | | 4 | | | | 4 |
| 13 | (Poland) (12) Jarosław Hampel | | | 0 | | | | | 1 | | 2 | | | 1 | | | | | | 0 | | 4 | | | | 4 |
| 14 | (England) (4) Lee Richardson | 3 | | | | | | | 0 | | | | 1 | | | | 0 | | | | 0 | 4 | | | | 4 |
| 15 | (Poland) (15) Piotr Protasiewicz | | | | 0 | | | 2 | | | 0 | | | | | | 1 | 0 | | | | 3 | | | | 3 |
| 16 | (Italy) (7) Mattia Carpanese | | 0 | | | | | 0 | | | | | 0 | 0 | | | | | 0 | | | 0 | | | | 0 |
| R1 | (Italy) (R1) Daniele Tessari | 0 | | | | | | | | | | | | | | | | | | | | 0 | R1 | | | |
| R2 | (Italy) (R2) Simone Terenzani | | | | | | | | | | | | | | | | | | | | | 0 | R2 | | | |

m - exclusion for exceeding two minute time allowance • t - exclusion for touching the tapes • x - other exclusion • e - retired or mechanical failure • f - fell • ns - non-starter • nc - non-classify

| gate A - inside | gate B | gate C | gate D - outside |
