= 2006 Speedway Grand Prix of Slovenia =

Speedway Grand Prix event

- Venue: Matija Gubec Stadium
- Location: Krško, (Slovenia)
- Start date: 22 April 2006
- Competitors: 16 (2 reserves)

The 2006 Speedway Grand Prix of Slovenia was the first round of the 2006 Speedway Grand Prix season (the world championship). It took place on 22 April 2006 at the Matija Gubec Stadium in Krško, (Slovenia).

It was the fifth time that the Speedway Grand Prix of Slovenia had been held.

The Grand Prix was by the Danish rider Nicki Pedersen (his third career Grand Prix win).

== Grand Prix result ==
Placing	Rider	1	2	3	4	5	6	7	8	9	10	11	12	13	14	15	16	17	18	19	20	Pts	SF1	SF2	Final	GP Pts
1	(Denmark) (15) Nicki Pedersen				3			2			2						1	3				11	3		3	25
2	(Australia) (6) Jason Crump		3				1			3							3			2		12		2	2	20
3	(Poland) (3) Tomasz Gollob	1						1				3				3				3		11		3	1	18
4	(Sweden) (11) Tony Rickardsson			3				3		2					3						2	13	2		0	16
5	(Australia) (5) Leigh Adams		2			3					3					1					1	10		e		10
6	(Slovenia) (14) Matej Žagar				1		2					0		3							3	9	1			9
7	(England) (16) Scott Nicholls				2				2	1						2			2			9		1		9
8	(Sweden) (9) Antonio Lindbäck			1		2						1					2		3			9	0			9
9	(England) (10) Lee Richardson			0			3						3			0		2				8				8
10	(Sweden) (12) Andreas Jonsson			2					3		1			2						0		8				8
11	(Denmark) (13) Bjarne Pedersen				0	1							1		2					1		5				5
12	(United States) (2) Greg Hancock	3					0				0				1				1			5				5
13	(Poland) (1) Jarosław Hampel	2				0				0				1				1				4				4
14	(Slovenia) (8) Matej Ferjan		0						1			2			0			0				3				3
15	(Denmark) (4) Niels Kristian Iversen	0							0				2				0				0	2				2
16	(Poland) (7) Piotr Protasiewicz		1					0					0	0					0			1				1
R1	(Slovenia) (R1) Izak Šantej																					0	R1			
R2	(Slovenia) (R2) Jernej Kolenko																					0	R2			

m - exclusion for exceeding two minute time allowance • t - exclusion for touching the tapes • x - other exclusion • e - retired or mechanical failure • f - fell • ns - non-starter • nc - non-classify

gate A - inside	gate B	gate C	gate D - outside
