= Eric Andersson =

Swedish motorcycle speedway rider

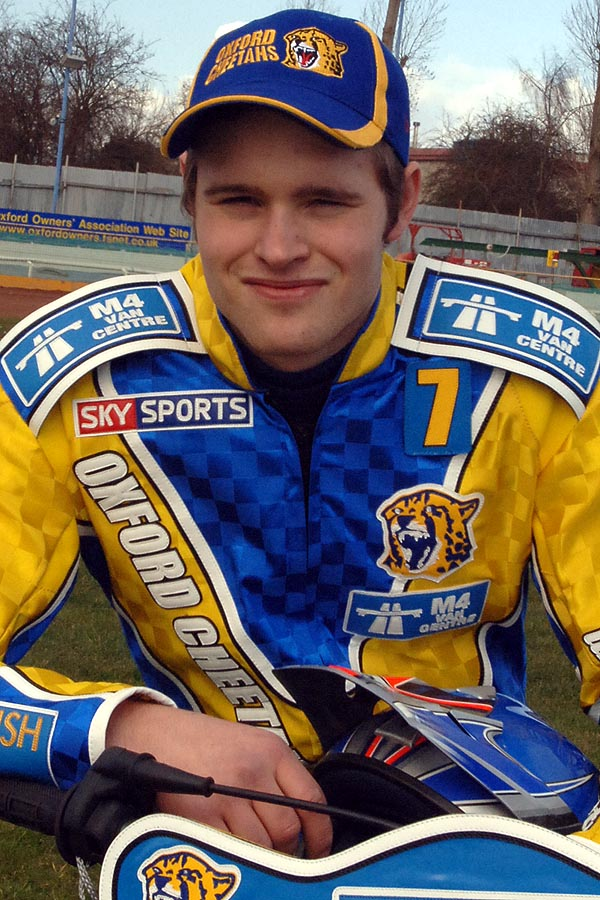
- Andersson in 2007
- Born: 15 June 1984 (age 42); St Dicka, Fors, Sweden
- Nationality: Swedish

Career history

Sweden
- 2000-2002, 2009-2013: Masarna
- 2003-2004: Rospiggarna
- 2005-2007: Smederna
- 2005: Vargarna

Denmark
- 2008: Holsted Tigers

Great Britain
- 2006-2007: Oxford Cheetahs

Poland
- 2007-2009: Grudziądz
- 2010-2014: Rawicz

Team honours
- 2000: Swedish Elitserien Champion
- 2005: Danish Superliga Champion
- 2005: Swedish Allsvenskan Champion
- 2008: Swedish Allsvenskan Champion
- 2012: Polish II liga Champion

Eric Andersson (born 15 June 1984) is a former motorcycle speedway rider from Sweden.

== Career ==
Andersson came to prominence when he reached the final of the 2004 Speedway Under-21 World Championship.

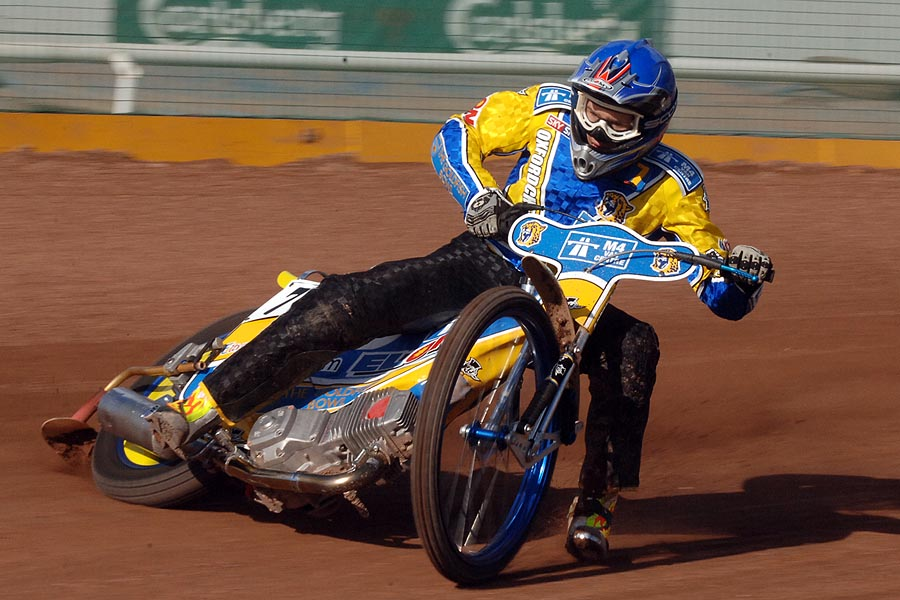
Andersson riding for Oxford

In 2006, Andersson joined the Oxford Cheetahs to ride in the 2006 Elite League speedway season. The following season, he resigned for the Cheetahs but the club withdrew from the league but Andersson continued to ride for Rospiggarna in Sweden and in Grudziądz in Poland.

Andersson rode one heat in 2007 Speedway Grand Prix of Sweden, when he replaced injured Wiesław Jaguś in Heat 19.

After finishing his career in Britain, Andersson concentrated on the Team Speedway Polish Championship and rode from 2010 to 2014 for Kolejarz Rawicz in the Polish Speedway First League and Polish Speedway Second League respectively.

== Speedway Grand Prix results ==
2006 Speedway Grand Prix Final Championship standings (Riding No 18)
Race no.	Grand Prix	Pos.	Pts.	Heats	Draw No
3 /10	(Sweden) Swedish SGP	18	-	-	18

2007 Speedway Grand Prix Final Championship standings (Riding No 18)
Race no.	Grand Prix	Pos.	Pts.	Heats	Draw No
3 /11	(Sweden) Swedish SGP	18	0	(0)	18

permanent speedway rider
wild card, track reserve or qualified reserve
rider not classified (track reserve who did not start)

== Career details ==
=== World Championships ===
- Individual World Championship (Speedway Grand Prix)
  - 2006 - track reserve
  - 2007 - 37th place (0 points in one event)
- Individual U-21 World Championship
  - 2004 - (Poland) Wrocław - 13th place (5 points)
- Team U-21 World Championship
  - 2005 - (Czech Republic) Pardubice - Runner-up (8 points)

=== European Championships ===
- Individual European Championship
  - 2007 - (Austria) Wiener Neustadt - track reserve
- Individual U-19 European Championship
  - 2000 - (Slovenia) Ljubljana - 13th place (5 points)
  - 2003 - (Germany) Pocking - 10th place (6 points)

== See also ==
- Sweden national speedway team
- List of Speedway Grand Prix riders
- Speedway in Sweden
