= 2006 Speedway Grand Prix of Great Britain =

Speedway Grand Prix event

- Venue: Millennium Stadium
- Location: Cardiff, (Wales)
- Start date: 3 June 2006
- Competitors: 16 (2 reserves)

The 2006 Speedway Grand Prix of Great Britain was the fourth round of the 2006 Speedway Grand Prix season (the world championship). It took place on 3 June 2006 at the Millennium Stadium in Cardiff, Wales.

It was the 12th time that the Speedway Grand Prix of Great Britain had been held.

The Grand Prix was by the Australian rider Jason Crump (his 15th career Grand Prix win).

== Grand Prix result ==
Placing	Rider	1	2	3	4	5	6	7	8	9	10	11	12	13	14	15	16	17	18	19	20	Pts	SF1	SF2	Final	GP Pts
1	(Australia) (15) Jason Crump				3			1			3						1	3				11		3	3	25
2	(Sweden) (6) Andreas Jonsson		0				2			3							3			1		9		2	2	20
3	(Poland) (9) Jarosław Hampel			3		3						f					0		2			8	2		1	18
4	(United States) (8) Greg Hancock		2						3			2			3			2				12	3		x	16
5	(Denmark) (4) Bjarne Pedersen	3							2				2				2				3	12		1		12
6	(Sweden) (3) Tony Rickardsson	2						3				3				2				0		10	1			10
7	(Slovenia) (12) Matej Žagar			2					1		1			3						2		9	f			9
8	(England) (7) Scott Nicholls		1					0					3	1					3			8		0		8
9	(Sweden) (10) Antonio Lindbäck			0			3						1			3		1				8				8
10	(Poland) (1) Tomasz Gollob	1				2				2				2				0				7				7
11	(Australia) (5) Leigh Adams		3			0					2					f					1	6				6
12	(Denmark) (13) Niels Kristian Iversen				1	1							0		0					3		5				5
13	(England) (11) Lee Richardson			1				2		1					1						0	5				5
14	(Denmark) (14) Nicki Pedersen				e		1					1		0							2	4				4
15	(Poland) (16) Piotr Protasiewicz				2				0	0						1			0			3				3
16	(England) (2) Simon Stead	0					0				0				2				1			3				3
R1	(England) (R1) Edward Kennett																					0	R1			
R2	(England) (R2) Ben Wilson																					0	R2			

m - exclusion for exceeding two minute time allowance • t - exclusion for touching the tapes • x - other exclusion • e - retired or mechanical failure • f - fell • ns - non-starter • nc - non-classify

gate A - inside	gate B	gate C	gate D - outside
