= 2006 Speedway Grand Prix of Sweden =

Speedway Grand Prix event

- Venue: Smedstadion
- Location: Eskilstuna, (Sweden)
- Start date: 20 May 2006
- Competitors: 16 (2 reserves)

The 2006 Speedway Grand Prix of Sweden was the third round of the 2006 Speedway Grand Prix season (the world championship). It took place on 6 May 2006 at the Smedstadion in Eskilstuna, Sweden.

It was the 12th time that the Speedway Grand Prix of Sweden had been held.

The Grand Prix was by the Australian rider Jason Crump (his 14th career Grand Prix win).

== Grand Prix result ==
Placing	Rider	1	2	3	4	5	6	7	8	9	10	11	12	13	14	15	16	17	18	19	20	Pts	SF1	SF2	Final	GP Pts
1	(Australia) (10) Jason Crump			3			2						3			3		2				13		2	3	25
2	(United States) (8) Greg Hancock		3						3			3			3			3				15	3		2	20
3	(Poland) (12) Tomasz Gollob			2					0		3			3						3		11	2		1	18
4	(Denmark) (6) Nicki Pedersen		1				3			3							3			2		12		3	0	16
5	(Australia) (4) Leigh Adams	2							2				2				2				3	11		1		11
6	(Sweden) (16) Andreas Jonsson				3				1	2						1			3			10	f			10
7	(Poland) (5) Jarosław Hampel		2			3					2					0					1	8	1			8
8	(Denmark) (11) Bjarne Pedersen			1				2		0					2						2	7		0		7
9	(Sweden) (1) Freddie Lindgren	1				2				1				2				1				7				7
10	(Sweden) (2) Antonio Lindbäck	3					0				0				1				2			6				6
11	(England) (9) Scott Nicholls			t		1						2					1		1			5				5
12	(Denmark) (15) Niels Kristian Iversen				2			1			1						0	0				4				4
13	(Sweden) (7) Tony Rickardsson		0					3					1	e					0			4				4
14	(Slovenia) (14) Matej Žagar				1		1					1		1							0	4				4
15	(Poland) (3) Piotr Protasiewicz	0						0				0				2				1		3				3
16	(England) (13) Lee Richardson				0	0							0		0					0		0				0
R1	(Sweden) (R1) Jonas Davidsson			0																		0	R1			
R2	(Sweden) (R2) Eric Andersson																					0	R2			

m - exclusion for exceeding two minute time allowance • t - exclusion for touching the tapes • x - other exclusion • e - retired or mechanical failure • f - fell • ns - non-starter • nc - non-classify

gate A - inside	gate B	gate C	gate D - outside
