= 2006 Speedway Grand Prix of Europe =

Speedway Grand Prix event

- Venue: Olympic Stadium
- Location: Wrocław, (Poland)
- Start date: 6 May 2006
- Competitors: 16 (2 reserves)

The 2006 Speedway Grand Prix of Europe was the second round of the 2006 Speedway Grand Prix season (the world championship). It took place on 6 May 2006 at the Olympic Stadium in Wrocław, Poland.

It was the sixth time that the Speedway Grand Prix of Europe had been held.

The Grand Prix was by the Australian rider Jason Crump (his 13th career Grand Prix win).

== Grand Prix result ==
| Placing | Rider | 1 | 2 | 3 | 4 | 5 | 6 | 7 | 8 | 9 | 10 | 11 | 12 | 13 | 14 | 15 | 16 | 17 | 18 | 19 | 20 | Pts | SF1 | SF2 | Final | GP Pts |
|---|---|---|---|---|---|---|---|---|---|---|---|---|---|---|---|---|---|---|---|---|---|---|---|---|---|---|
| 1 | (Australia) (4) Jason Crump | 3 | | | | | | | 2 | | | | 2 | | | | 3 | | | | 3 | 13 | | 2 | 3 | 25 |
| 2 | (United States) (7) Greg Hancock | | 3 | | | | | 3 | | | | | 3 | 3 | | | | | x | | | 12 | | 3 | 2 | 20 |
| 3 | (Slovenia) (10) Matej Žagar | | | 1 | | | 2 | | | | | | 1 | | | 3 | | 2 | | | | 9 | 2 | | 1 | 18 |
| 4 | (Poland) (9) Jarosław Hampel | | | 0 | | 3 | | | | | | 3 | | | | | 1 | | 2 | | | 9 | 3 | | x | 16 |
| 5 | (Denmark) (12) Nicki Pedersen | | | 3 | | | | | 3 | | 3 | | | 2 | | | | | | 3 | | 14 | 1 | | | 14 |
| 6 | (Poland) (8) Tomasz Gollob | | 1 | | | | | | 1 | | | 2 | | | 2 | | | 3 | | | | 9 | 0 | | | 9 |
| 7 | (England) (6) Scott Nicholls | | 2 | | | | 3 | | | 2 | | | | | | | t | | | 2 | | 9 | | 0 | | 9 |
| 8 | (Australia) (1) Leigh Adams | 2 | | | | 1 | | | | 3 | | | | 0 | | | | 1 | | | | 7 | | 1 | | 7 |
| 9 | (Denmark) (15) Niels Kristian Iversen | | | | 3 | | | 1 | | | 0 | | | | | | 2 | 0 | | | | 6 | | | | 6 |
| 10 | (Denmark) (2) Bjarne Pedersen | 1 | | | | | 0 | | | | 1 | | | | 3 | | | | 1 | | | 6 | | | | 6 |
| 11 | (Sweden) (11) Tony Rickardsson | | | 2 | | | | 2 | | 1 | | | | | 0 | | | | | | 1 | 6 | | | | 6 |
| 12 | (Poland) (13) Krzysztof Kasprzak | | | | 2 | 2 | | | | | | | 0 | | 1 | | | | | 1 | | 6 | | | | 6 |
| 13 | (Sweden) (5) Andreas Jonsson | | 0 | | | 0 | | | | | 2 | | | | | 1 | | | | | 2 | 5 | | | | 5 |
| 14 | (England) (16) Lee Richardson | | | | 1 | | | | 0 | 0 | | | | | | 0 | | | 3 | | | 4 | | | | 4 |
| 15 | (Poland) (14) Piotr Protasiewicz | | | | 0 | | 1 | | | | | 1 | | 1 | | | | | | | 0 | 3 | | | | 3 |
| 16 | (Sweden) (3) Antonio Lindbäck | 0 | | | | | | 0 | | | | 0 | | | | 2 | | | | 0 | | 2 | | | | 2 |
| R1 | (Poland) (R1) Janusz Kołodziej | | | | | | | | | | | | | | | | 0 | | | | | 0 | R1 | | | |
| R2 | (Poland) (R2) Tomasz Gapiński | | | | | | | | | | | | | | | | | | | | | 0 | R2 | | | |

m - exclusion for exceeding two minute time allowance • t - exclusion for touching the tapes • x - other exclusion • e - retired or mechanical failure • f - fell • ns - non-starter • nc - non-classify

| gate A - inside | gate B | gate C | gate D - outside |
