= 1995 Speedway Under-21 World Championship =

European motorcycle speedway event

World Under-21 Championship
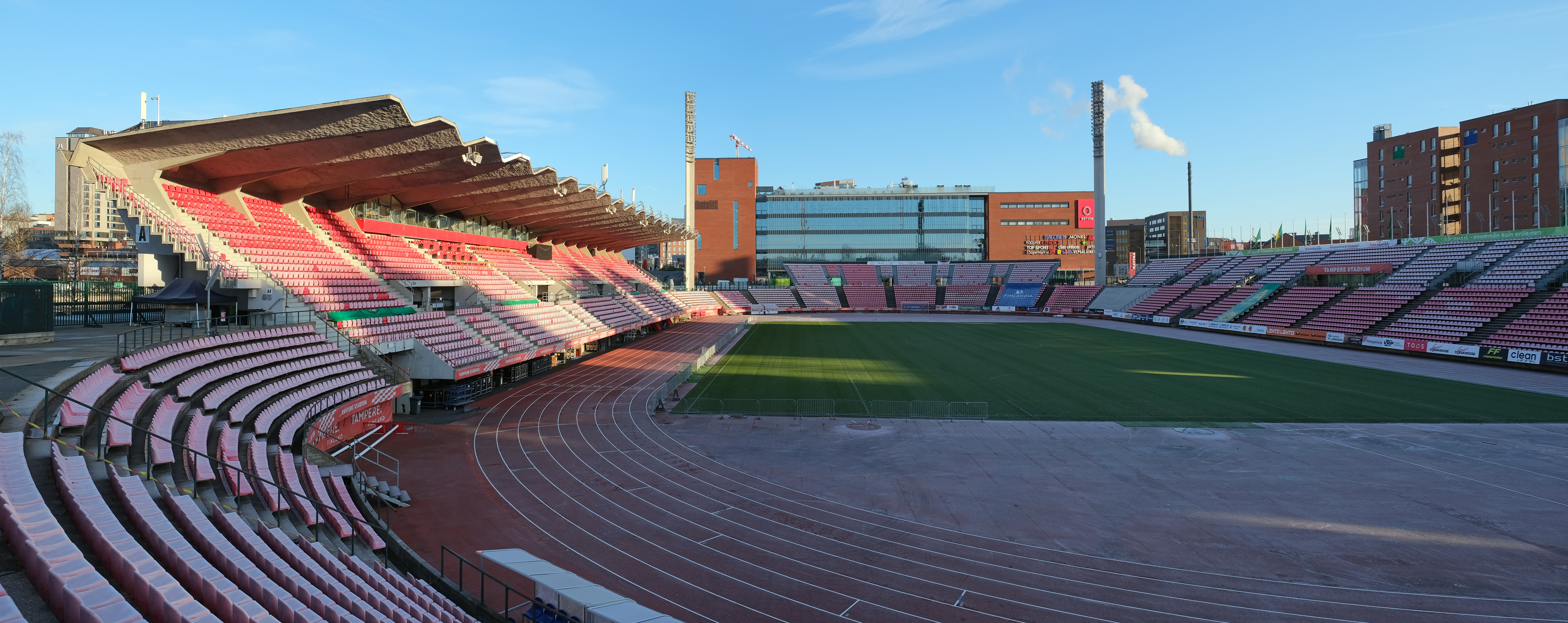
- Tampere Stadium hosted the 1995 final
- Venue: Ratinan Stadion
- Location: Tampere, Finland
- Start date: 5 August 1995

The 1995 Individual Speedway Junior World Championship was the 19th edition of the World motorcycle speedway Under-21 Championships.

The event was won by Jason Crump of Australia after winning a run-off against Daniel Andersson. In the run-off Andersson fell on the first lap, leaving Crump to complete three laps on his own to be crowned the champion. The success also gained him qualification to the 1996 Speedway Grand Prix.

== World final ==
- 5 August 1995
- (Finland) Ratinan Stadion, Tampere

Placing	Rider	Total	1	2	3	4	5	6	7	8	9	10	11	12	13	14	15	16	17	18	19	20	Pts	Pos	21	22
1	(Australia) (2) Jason Crump	13	3					3				2				3				2			13	2		3
2	(Sweden) (9) Daniel Andersson	13			3		2						3					2		3			13	1		F
3	(Australia) (12) Ryan Sullivan	12			2					3		3			2						2		12	6	3	
4	(Czech Republic) (7) Tomáš Topinka	12		2					3					3	3					1			12	4	2	
5	(Finland) (6) Kai Laukkanen	12		3				2			3							3			1		12	3	1	
6	(England) (3) Ben Howe	12	2						2				2				3				3		12	5	0	
7	(Poland) (13) Piotr Protasiewicz	10				3	3							2		2					0		10	7		
8	(Denmark) (15) Ronni Pedersen	7				2			0			1						1	3				7	8		
9	(Czech Republic) (11) Jiří Štancl Jr.	7			1				1		2					1						2	7	9		
10	(England) (4) Savalas Clouting	6	0							2				1				0				3	6	10		
11	(Poland) (1) Rafał Dobrucki	6	1				1				1				1				2				6	11		
12	(Czech Republic) (8) Antonín Šváb Jr.	4		1						1			1			0			1				4	12		
13	(Germany) (16) Mirko Wolter	2				0				0	0						2			0			2	13		
14	(Hungary) (5) Norbert Magosi	2		E			0					0					1					1	2	14		
15	(Denmark) (14) Nicki Pedersen	2				1		1					0		0							0	2	15		
16	(Poland) (10) Waldemar Walczak	0			0			F						0			F		0				0	16		
R1	(England) (R1) Paul Hurry	0																					0	R1		
R2	(Czech Republic) (R2) Marián Jirout	0																					0	R2		
Placing	Rider	Total	1	2	3	4	5	6	7	8	9	10	11	12	13	14	15	16	17	18	19	20	Pts	Pos	21	22

m - exclusion for exceeding two minute time allowance • t - exclusion for touching the tapes • x - other exclusion • e - retired or mechanical failure • f - fell • ns - non-starter • nc - non-classify

gate A - inside	gate B	gate C	gate D - outside
