= 2008 Mieczysław Połukard Criterium of Polish Speedway Leagues Aces =

Polish speedway event

2008 Criterium of Aces

Seasons
- ← 2007 2009 →

The 27th Mieczysław Połukard Criterium of Polish Speedway League Aces was the 2008 version of the Mieczysław Połukard Criterium of Polish Speedway Leagues Aces. It took place on March 30 in the Polonia Stadium in Bydgoszcz, Poland.

== Starting positions draw ==
1. (Poland) Tomasz Gollob - Stal Gorzów Wlkp.
2. (Poland) **Krzysztof Buczkowski - Polonia Bydgoszcz**
3. (Poland) Sławomir Drabik - Złomrex Włókniarz Częstochowa
4. (Poland) Damian Baliński - Unia Leszno
5. (Sweden) **Andreas Jonsson - Polonia Bydgoszcz**
6. (Poland) Wiesław Jaguś - Unibax Toruń
7. (Poland) Daniel Jeleniewski - Atlas Wrocław
8. (Germany) Martin Smolinski - GTŻ Grudziądz
9. (Poland) **Rafał Okoniewski - Polonia Bydgoszcz**
10. (Poland) Krzysztof Kasprzak - Unia Leszno
11. (Czech Republic) Luboš Tomíček, Jr. - Kolejarz Opole
12. (Russia) **Emil Sayfutdinov - Polonia Bydgoszcz**
13. (Poland) Tomasz Chrzanowski - Lotos Gdańsk
14. (Australia) Ryan Sullivan - Unibax Toruń
15. (Poland) Tomasz Jędrzejak - Atlas Wrocław
16. (Sweden) **Jonas Davidsson - Polonia Bydgoszcz**
17. (Poland) **Marcin Jędrzejewski - Polonia Bydgoszcz**
18. (Poland) **Michał Łopaczewski - Polonia Bydgoszcz**

Note: riders in bold type was Polonia' riders.

== Heat details ==
Placing	Rider	Total	1	2	3	4	5	6	7	8	9	10	11	12	13	14	15	16	17	18	19	20	Pts	Pos
1	(Poland) (1) Tomasz Gollob (GOR)	14	2				3				3				3				3				14	1
2	(Russia) (12) **Emil Sayfutdinov** (BYD)	13			3					3		3			2						2		13	2
3	(Poland) (13) Tomasz Chrzanowski (GDA)	11				3	1							3		3					1		11	3
4	(Poland) (10) Krzysztof Kasprzak (LES)	10			2			1						2			3		2				10	4
5	(Poland) (6) Wiesław Jaguś (TOR)	9		0				3			2							1			3		9	5
6	(Poland) (15) Tomasz Jędrzejak (WRO)	9				2			2			2						2	1				9	6
7	(Poland) (4) Damian Baliński (LES)	8	3							2				0				0				3	8	7
8	(Sweden) (16) **Jonas Davidsson** (BYD)	8				1				1	1						2			3			8	8
9	(Sweden) (5) **Andreas Jonsson** (BYD)	8		3			2					1					1					1	8	9
10	(Poland) (9) **Rafał Okoniewski** (BYD)	7			1		E2						2					3		1			7	10
11	(Australia) (14) Ryan Sullivan (TOR)	6				0		2					3		1							0	6	11
12	(Poland) (2) **Krzysztof Buczkowski** (BYD)	5	1					0				0				2				2			5	12
13	(Poland) (3) Sławomir Drabik (CZE)	4	0						3				1				0				0		4	13
14	(Czech Republic) (11) Luboš Tomíček, Jr. (OPO)	4			0				1		0					1						2	4	14
15	(Germany) (8) Martin Smolinski (GRU)	2		2						0			0			0			0				2	15
16	(Poland) (7) Daniel Jeleniewski (WRO)	2		1					0					1	0					0			2	16
-	(17) **Marcin Jędrzejewski** (BYD)	0																					0	-
-	(18) **Michał Łopaczewski** (BYD)	0																					0	-
Placing	Rider	Total	1	2	3	4	5	6	7	8	9	10	11	12	13	14	15	16	17	18	19	20	Pts	Pos

m - exclusion for exceeding two minute time allowance • t - exclusion for touching the tapes • x - other exclusion • e - retired or mechanical failure • f - fell • ns - non-starter • nc - non-classify

gate A - inside	gate B	gate C	gate D - outside

=== Heat after heat ===
1. (65, 47) Baliński, Gollob, Buczkowski, Drabik
2. (65,49) Jonsson, Smolinski, Jeleniewski, Jaguś
3. (64,75) Saifutdinov, Kasprzak, Okoniewski, Tomíček
4. (64,97) Chrzanowski, Jędrzejak, Davidsson, Sullivan
5. (65,82) Gollob, Jonsson, Chrzanowski, Okoniewski
6. **(64,64) Jaguś**, Sullivan, Kasprzak, Buczkowski
7. (65,25) Drabik, Jędrzejak, Tomíček, Jeleniewski
8. (65,59) Saifutdinov, Baliński, Davidsson, Smolinski
9. (66,77) Gollob, Jaguś, Davidsson, Tomíček
10. (66,15) Saifutdinov, Jędrzejak, Jonsson, Buczkowski
11. (65,96) Sullivan, Okoniewski, Drabik, Smolinski
12. (66,07) Chrzanowski, Kasprzak, Jeleniewski, Baliński
13. (66,34) Gollob, Saifutdinov, Sullivan, Jeleniewski
14. (66,95) Chrzanowski, Buczkowski, Tomíček, Smolinski
15. (66,36) Kasprzak, Davidsson, Jonsson, Drabik
16. (65,84) Okoniewski, Jędrzejak, Jaguś, Baliński
17. (68,18) Gollob, Kasprzak, Jędrzejak, Smolinski
18. (67,03) Davidsson, Buczkowski, Okoniewski, Jeleniewski
19. (66,46) Jaguś, Saifutdinov, Chrzanowski, Drabik
20. (66,40) Baliński, Tomíček, Jonsson, Sullivan

== Sources ==
- Polonia.Bydgoszcz.pl
