= 2006 Speedway Grand Prix =

World speedway competition

Season details
- Dates: April 22 - September 23
- Events: 10
- Cities: 10
- Countries: 8
- Riders: 15 permanents 1 wild card(s); 2 track reserves
- Heats: 230 (in 10 events)

Winners
- Champion: AUS Jason Crump
- Runner-up: USA Greg Hancock
- 3rd place: DNK Nicki Pedersen

The 2006 Speedway Grand Prix was the 61st edition of the official World Championship and the 12th season in the Speedway Grand Prix era used to determine the Speedway World Champion.

== Event format ==
The format remained the same as 2005 with 16 riders taking part in each Grand Prix and over the course of 20 heats each rider will race against every other rider once. The top 8 scorers advance to a semi-final and from each semi-final the 1st and 2nd placed riders will advance to the GP final. All riders apart from the qualifiers for the final carry forward the points earned in the first 20 heats over the course of the season. The riders placing in the final receive points as follows:

- 1st place = 25 points
- 2nd place = 20 points
- 3rd place = 18 points
- 4th place = 16 points

== Qualification for Grand Prix ==
For the 2006 season, there were 15 permanent riders, to be joined at each Grand Prix by one wild card. The top 8 riders from the 2005 championship qualified as of right. They were, in 2005 championship order:

- (Sweden) Tony Rickardsson (retired part way through the season and replaced by (Denmark) Hans Andersen)
- (Australia) Jason Crump
- (Australia) Leigh Adams
- (Denmark) Nicki Pedersen
- (United States) Greg Hancock
- (Denmark) Bjarne Pedersen
- (Poland) Tomasz Gollob
- (Sweden) Andreas Jonsson

They were joined by 7 riders named by the organisers of the series, who are: (in alphabetical order)

- (Poland) Jarosław Hampel
- (Denmark) Niels Kristian Iversen
- (Sweden) Antonio Lindback
- (United Kingdom) Scott Nicholls
- (Poland) Piotr Protasiewicz
- (United Kingdom) Lee Richardson
- (Slovenia) Matej Zagar

== Calendar ==
Round	Date	City and venue	Winner	Runner-up	3rd placed	4th placed	Results
1	22 April	(Slovenia) Krško, Slovenia; Matija Gubec Stadium	(Denmark) Nicki Pedersen	(Australia) Jason Crump	(Poland) Tomasz Gollob	(Sweden) Tony Rickardsson	results
2	6 May	Wrocław, Poland; Olympic Stadium	(Australia) Jason Crump	(United States) Greg Hancock	(Slovenia) Matej Žagar	(Poland) Jarosław Hampel	results
3	20 May	(Sweden) Eskilstuna, Sweden; Smedstadion	(Australia) Jason Crump	(United States) Greg Hancock	(Poland) Tomasz Gollob	(Denmark) Nicki Pedersen	results
4	3 June	(United Kingdom) Cardiff, Great Britain; Millennium Stadium	(Australia) Jason Crump	(Sweden) Andreas Jonsson	(Poland) Jarosław Hampel	(United States) Greg Hancock	results
5	24 June	(Denmark) Copenhagen, Denmark; Parken Stadium	(Denmark) Hans N. Andersen	(Australia) Jason Crump	(Denmark) Bjarne Pedersen	(Sweden) Antonio Lindbäck	results
6	29 July	(Italy) Lonigo, Italy; Santa Marina Stadium	(Australia) Jason Crump	(United Kingdom) Scott Nicholls	(Denmark) Hans N. Andersen	(Australia) Leigh Adams	results
7	12 August	Målilla, Sweden; G&B Stadium	(Sweden) Andreas Jonsson	(Denmark) Hans N. Andersen	(Australia) Leigh Adams	(Australia) Jason Crump	results
8	26 August	(Czech Republic) Prague, Czech Republic; Markéta Stadium	(Denmark) Hans N. Andersen	(Slovenia) Matej Žagar	(Sweden) Antonio Lindbäck	(Poland) Jarosław Hampel	results
9	9 September	(Latvia) Daugavpils, Latvia; Latvijas Spīdveja Centrs	(United States) Greg Hancock	(Sweden) Antonio Lindbäck	(Denmark) Nicki Pedersen	(Sweden) Andreas Jonsson	results
10	23 September	(Poland) Bydgoszcz, Poland; Polonia Stadium	(Denmark) Nicki Pedersen	(United States) Greg Hancock	(Poland) Tomasz Gollob	(Poland) Wiesław Jaguś	results

results: Slovenia • Europe • Sweden • Great Britain • Danmark • Italy • Scandinavia • Czech Republic • Latvia • Poland

== Final standings ==
Qualifies for next season's Grand Prix series
Full-time Grand Prix rider
Wild card, track reserve or qualified reserve

Pos.	Rider	Points	SVN (Slovenia)	EUR (Poland)	SWE (Sweden)	GBR (United Kingdom)	DEN (Denmark)	ITA (Italy)	SCA (Sweden)	CZE (Czech Republic)	LAT (Latvia)	POL (Poland)
Gold	(Australia) (2) Jason Crump	188	20	25	25	25	20	25	16	14	11	7
Silver	(United States) (5) Greg Hancock	144	5	20	20	16	13	9	12	4	25	20
Bronze	(Denmark) (4) Nicki Pedersen	134	25	14	16	4	6	9	11	6	18	25
4	(Sweden) (8) Andreas Jonsson	119	8	5	10	20	7	9	25	7	16	12
5	(Australia) (3) Leigh Adams	106	10	7	11	6	12	16	18	12	8	6
6	(Denmark) (16) (19) Hans Andersen	101	–	–	–	–	25	18	20	25	4	9
7	(Slovenia) (13) Matej Žagar	97	9	18	4	9	4	10	4	20	11	8
8	(Poland) (7) Tomasz Gollob	94	18	9	18	7	3	7	4	6	4	18
9	(Poland) (11) Jarosław Hampel	91	4	16	8	18	2	4	10	16	7	6
10	(Sweden) (10) Antonio Lindbäck	89	9	2	6	8	16	4	3	18	20	3
11	(United Kingdom) (9) Scott Nicholls	83	9	9	5	8	8	20	8	–	9	7
12	(Denmark) (6) Bjarne Pedersen	82	5	6	7	12	18	10	8	2	7	7
13	(Denmark) (15) Niels Kristian Iversen	51	2	6	4	5	8	5	6	8	4	3
14	(Sweden) (1) Tony Rickardsson	41	16	6	4	10	5	–	–	–	–	–
15	(United Kingdom) (12) Lee Richardson	39	8	4	0	5	9	4	4	3	0	2
16	(Poland) (14) Piotr Protasiewicz	31	1	3	3	3	1	3	4	5	4	4
17	(Poland) (16) Wiesław Jaguś	16	–	–	–	–	–	–	–	–	–	16
18	(Australia) (20) Ryan Sullivan	10	–	–	–	–	–	–	1	9	–	–
19	(Sweden) (16) (17) Fredrik Lindgren	7	–	–	7	–	–	–	ns	–	–	–
20	(Poland) (16) Krzysztof Kasprzak	6	–	6	–	–	–	–	–	–	–	–
21	(Latvia) (16) Kasts Poudzuks	4	–	–	–	–	–	–	–	–	4	–
22	(Czech Republic) (17) Luboš Tomíček, Jr.	4	–	–	–	–	–	–	–	4	–	–
23	(Slovenia) (16) Matej Ferjan	3	3	–	–	–	–	–	–	–	–	–
24	(United Kingdom) (16) Simon Stead	3	–	–	–	3	–	–	–	–	–	–
25	(Czech Republic) (16) Adrian Rymel	2	–	–	–	–	–	–	–	2	–	–
26	(Denmark) (17) Charlie Gjedde	1	–	–	–	–	1	–	–	–	–	–
27	(Denmark) (18) Kenneth Bjerre	1	–	–	–	–	1	–	–	–	–	–
28	(Italy) (16) Mattia Carpanese	0	–	–	–	–	–	0	–	–	–	–
29	(Poland) (17) Janusz Kołodziej	0	–	0	–	–	–	–	–	–	–	ns
30	(Sweden) (17) (18) Jonas Davidsson	0	–	–	0	–	–	–	ns	–	–	–
31	(Italy) (17) Daniele Tessari	0	–	–	–	–	–	0	–	–	–	–
32	(Russia) (17) Grigory Laguta	0	–	–	–	–	–	–	–	–	0	–
33	(Czech Republic) (18) Zdeněk Simota	0	–	–	–	–	–	–	–	0	–	–
34	(Latvia) (18) Andrejs Koroļevs	0	–	–	–	–	–	–	–	–	0	–
Rider(s) not classified
	(Slovenia) (17) Izak Šantej	-	ns	-	-	-	-	-	-	-	-	-
	(United Kingdom) (17) Edward Kennett	-	-	-	-	ns	-	-	-	-	-	-
	(Slovenia) (18) Jernej Kolenko	-	ns	-	-	-	-	-	-	-	-	-
	(Poland) (18) Tomasz Gapiński	-	-	ns	-	-	-	-	-	-	-	-
	(Sweden) (18) Eric Andersson	-	-	-	ns	-	-	-	-	-	-	-
	(United Kingdom) (18) Ben Wilson	-	-	-	-	ns	-	-	-	-	-	-
	(Italy) (18) Simone Terenzani	-	-	-	-	-	-	ns	-	-	-	-
	(Poland) (18) Karol Ząbik	-	-	-	-	-	-	-	-	-	-	ns
Pos.	Rider	Points	SVN (Slovenia)	EUR (Poland)	SWE (Sweden)	GBR (United Kingdom)	DEN (Denmark)	ITA (Italy)	SCA (Sweden)	CZE (Czech Republic)	LAT (Latvia)	POL (Poland)

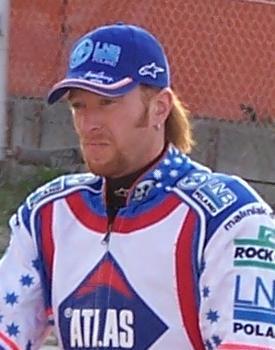
Jason Crump - World Champion 2006
