= Jonas Davidsson =

Swedish speedway rider

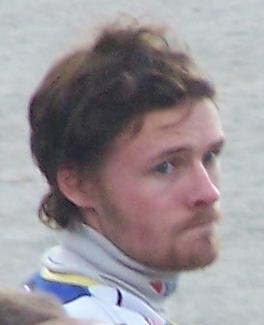
- Born: 7 August 1984 (age 42); Motala, Sweden
- Nationality: Swedish

Career history

Sweden
- 2000–2001, 2008: Smederna
- 2001: Örnarna
- 2002–2003, 2007, 2014: Rospiggarna
- 2002: Eldarna
- 2009–2011, 2013, 2015–2016, 2018–2020: Piraterna
- 2012: Dackarna
- 2013: Lejonen
- 2017: Vetlanda

Great Britain
- 2003, 2007: Reading Racers
- 2004: Oxford Cheetahs
- 2005: Swindon Robins
- 2006: Poole Pirates
- 2008–2012: Lakeside Hammers

Poland
- 2006, 2011–2013: Zielona Góra
- 2007–2009: Bydgoszcz
- 2010: Częstochowa
- 2014–2017: Gniezno
- 2019: Krosno

Individual honours
- 2005: Swedish U21 champion

Team honours
- 2008: Speedway World Cup bronze
- 2009: Elite League KO Cup
- 2002: Elitserien Winner
- 2001: Allsvenskan Winner

Jan Jonas Daniel Davidsson (born 7 August 1984 in Motala, Sweden) is a Swedish former motorcycle speedway rider. He earned 14 caps for the Sweden national speedway team.

== Career ==
Davidsson came to prominence after reaching three World Under 21 finals in 2003, 2004 and 2005. He also won the Swedish Junior Speedway Championship in 2005.

Davidsson signed for his first British team Reading Racers for the 2003 Premier League speedway season and his first Polish team Zielona Góra in 2006. In 2006, he rode for Poole Pirates before re-joining Reading.

In 2008, Davidsson experienced arguably his finest career achievement when he won a bronze medal representing Sweden at the 2008 Speedway World Cup. It was also in 2008 that he joined the Lakeside Hammers in the Elite League. He would go on spend five seasons with the club and win the Elite League Knockout Cup in 2009.

Davidsson continued to ride in Poland after his British career came to an end and last raced in 2019 for Krosno.

== Family ==
Davidsson's brother, Daniel (b. 1983), is also a speedway rider, as was his father Jan Davidsson (born 1956).

== Speedway Grand Prix results ==
2005 Speedway Grand Prix Final Championship standings (Riding No 16)
Race no.	Grand Prix	Pos.	Pts.	Heats	Draw No
7 /9	(Sweden) Scandinavian SGP	14	4	(0,1,2,1,0)	13

2006 Speedway Grand Prix Final Championship standings (Riding No 17) (18)
Race no.	Grand Prix	Pos.	Pts.	Heats	Draw No
3 /10	(Sweden) Swedish SGP	17	0	(0)	17
7 /10	(Sweden) Scandinavian SGP	18	-	-	18

2007 Speedway Grand Prix Final Championship standings (Riding No 17)
Race no.	Grand Prix	Pos.	Pts.	Heats	Draw No
3 /11	(Sweden) Swedish SGP	13	5	(2,3)	17
7 /11	(Sweden) Scandinavian SGP	17	-	-	17

2008 Speedway Grand Prix Final Championship standings (Riding No 16) (17)
Race no.	Grand Prix	Pos.	Pts.	Heats	Draw No
3 /11	(Sweden) Swedish SGP	10	7	(E,3,1,1,2)	10
7 /11	(Sweden) Scandinavian SGP	17	-	-	17

permanent speedway rider
wild card, track reserve or qualified reserve
rider not classified (track reserve who did not start)

== Career details ==
=== World Championships ===
- Individual U-21 World Championship (Under-21 World Championship)
  - 2003 - (Czech Republic) Slaný - 9th place (6 points)
  - 2004 - (Poland) Wrocław - 12th place (6 points)
  - 2005 - (Austria) Wiener Neustadt - 11th place (3 points)
- Team World Championship (Speedway World Cup)
  - 2007 - (Poland) Leszno - 5th place (9 points in Race-Off)
  - 2008 - (Denmark) Vojens - Bronze medal (10 points)
- Team U-21 World Championship (Under-21 Speedway World Cup)
  - 2005 - (Czech Republic) Pardubice - Runner-up (7 points)

=== European Championships ===
- Individual U-19 European Championship
  - 2000 - (Slovenia) Ljubljana - 6th place (8 points)
  - 2002 - (Latvia) Daugavpils - 6th place (9 points)

=== Others ===
- Mieczysław Połukard Criterium of Polish Speedway Leagues Aces - (Poland) Bydgoszcz
  - 2008 - 8th place (8 points)

== See also ==
- Swedish national speedway team
- List of Speedway Grand Prix riders
