= Antonio Lindbäck =

Swedish speedway rider

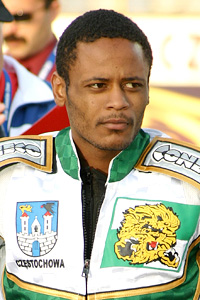
- Born: 5 May 1985 (age 41); Rio de Janeiro, Brazil
- Nickname: Anton, Rio Rocket
- Nationality: Swedish

Career history

Sweden
- 2001–2003: Gasarna
- 2001–2007, 2017–2022: Masarna
- 2008: Vargarna
- 2009–2010: Piraterna
- 2011–2016: Indianerna
- 2022–2024: Valsarna
- 2023–2024: Rospiggarna

Poland
- 2005: Wrocław
- 2007: Częstochowa
- 2007, 2011: Rybnik
- 2009–2010: Bydgoszcz
- 2012–2013, 2022: Gniezno
- 2014: Łódź
- 2015: Daugavpils
- 2016–2019: Grudziadz
- 2020: Zielona Góra
- 2023: Poznań
- 2024: Landshut

Great Britain
- 2003–2006, 2016: Poole
- 2007: Belle Vue

Denmark
- 2010–2012, 2014: Outrup/Varde

Speedway Grand Prix statistics
- SGP number: 85
- Starts: 102
- Podiums: 13 (3-2-8)
- Finalist: 16 times
- Winner: 3 times

Individual honours
- 2004: European Under-19 Champion
- 2005: Scandinavian Under-21 Champion
- 2012: Italian Grand Prix Champion
- 2012: Torun Grand Prix Champion
- 2015, 2017: Swedish Champion
- 2004, 2011: GP Challenge winner
- 2016: British Grand Prix Champion
- 2006: Swedish U21 champion

Team honours
- 2004, 2015: Speedway World Cup winner
- 2001: Sweden Division One Winner

Antonio Lindbäck (born 5 May 1985 in Rio de Janeiro, Brazil) is a motorcycle speedway rider from Sweden, who competed in the Speedway World Championship and was a member of the Swedish team who won the Speedway World Cup in 2004 and 2015. He earned 17 caps for the Sweden national speedway team.

== Career ==
Lindbäck made his international debut in 2004 with firstly a wild card ride in the Speedway Grand Prix series but he made a bigger impression in the Speedway World Cup riding for the Swedish team. He became the European Under-19 Champion in 2004 and Scandinavian Under-21 Champion in 2005.

In October 2004, during the Speedway Grand Prix Qualification, Lindbäck won the GP Challenge, which ensured that he claimed a permanent slot for the 2005 Grand Prix. He duly made his full SGP debut in 2005 finishing tenth both in that season and the subsequent 2006 championship.

Prior to the final 2007 Speedway Grand Prix round in Gelsenkirchen, it was announced that Lindbäck had decided to retire from speedway. However, he made a quick comeback competing for Vargarna in the Swedish second tier Allsvenskan and he was a major force in bringing the club to the play off final. Before the start of the 2009 season, he moved to Piraterna.

Lindbäck qualified for the 2012 Speedway Grand Prix via the Grand Prix Challenge and won his first Grand Prix in the 2012 Speedway Grand Prix of Italy in Terenzano. He was also included in the Swedish national team.

On 13 November 2020, Lindbäck announced his retirement for a second time but once again returned and in 2022 rode for Masarna and Valsarna in the Swedish leagues. He helped Valsarna win the 2022 Allsvenskan during the 2022 Swedish Speedway season.

In 2023, Lindbäck was part of the Swedish team that competed at the 2023 Speedway World Cup in Poland.

== Results ==
=== Speedway Grand Prix ===
2004 Speedway Grand Prix Final Championship standings (Riding No 24)
Race no.	Grand Prix	Pos.	Pts.	Heats	Draw No
6 /9	(Sweden) Scandinavian SGP	22	2	(0,1)	24

2005 Speedway Grand Prix Final Championship standings (Riding No 14)
Race no.	Grand Prix	Pos.	Pts.	Heats	Draw No
1 /9	(Europe) European SGP	4	16	(2,2,3,0,1) +2 +0)	13
2 /9	(Sweden) Swedish SGP	6	8	(2,1,2,0,3) +1	8
3 /9	(Slovenia) Slovenian SGP	12	3	(1,0,0,0,2) +3	14
4 /9	(United Kingdom) British SGP	7	8	(T,3,1,1,3) +1	7
5 /9	(Denmark) Danish SGP	3	18	(1,3,2,2,2) +3 +1	5
6 /9	(Czech Republic) Czech Rep. SGP	12	6	(2,0,1,2,X)	4
7 /9	(Sweden) Scandinavian SGP	10	7	(2,1,1,2,1	10
8 /9	(Poland) Polish SGP	16	0	(0,0,0,0,0)	3
9 /9	(Italy) Italian SGP	13	5	(1,0,1,3,-)	16

2006 Speedway Grand Prix Final Championship standings (Riding No 10)
Race no.	Grand Prix	Pos.	Pts.	Heats	Draw No
1 /10	(Slovenia) Slovenian SGP	7	9	(1,2,1,2,3) +0	9
2 /10	(Europe) European SGP	16	2	(0,0,0,2,0)	3
3 /10	(Sweden) Swedish SGP	10	6	(3,0,0,1,2)	2
4 /10	(United Kingdom) British SGP	9	8	(0,3,1,3,1)	10
5 /10	(Denmark) Danish SGP	4	16	(2,2,2,2,2) +2 +0	5
6 /10	(Italy) Italian SGP	14	4	(t,1,1,0,2)	3
7 /10	(Sweden) Scandinavian SGP	15	3	(2,0,1,F,0)	14
8 /10	(Czech Republic) Czech Rep. SGP	3	18	(3,1,1,F,3) +3 +1	1
9 /10	(Latvia) Latvian SGP	2	20	(3,2,3,3,2) +3 +2	12
10 /10	(Poland) Polish SGP	14	3	(0,3,E,0,0)	16

2007 Speedway Grand Prix Final Championship standings (Riding No 10)
Race no.	Grand Prix	Pos.	Pts.	Heats	Draw No
1 /11	(Italy) Italian SGP	14	3	(1,1,0,1,0)	12
2 /11	(Europe) European SGP	17	0	(0,0,0,0,0)	9
3 /11	(Sweden) Swedish SGP	17	3	(0,0,1,1,1	13
4 /11	(Denmark) Danish SGP	7	9	(3,2,0,3,1) +X	2
5 /11	(United Kingdom) British SGP	9	7	(3,2,1,1,0)	13
6 /11	(Czech Republic) Czech Rep. SGP	17	0	(0,0,0,-,-)	4
7 /11	(Sweden) Scandinavian SGP	14	3	(1,2,0,0,0)	9
8 /11	(Latvia) Latvian SGP	18	0	(X,-,-,-,-)	13
9 /11	(Poland) Polish SGP	10	5	(0,0,1,3,1)	7
10 /11	(Slovenia) Slovenian SGP	16	1	(0,0,1,0,0)	8
11 /11	(Germany) German SGP	retired → (19) Peter Karlsson			10

2009 Speedway Grand Prix Final Championship standings (Riding No 16)
Race no.	Grand Prix	Pos.	Pts.	Heats	Draw No
3 /11	(Sweden) Swedish SGP	3	17	(2,2,3,2,3) +3 +0	9
7 /11	(Sweden) Scandinavian SGP	6	10	(3,1,1,2,2) +1	1

2010 Speedway Grand Prix Final Championship standings (Riding No 16)
Race no.	Grand Prix	Pos.	Pts.	Heats	Draw No
3 /11	(Sweden) Swedish SGP	12	6	(1,1,1,0,3)	3

2011 Speedway Grand Prix Final Championship standings (Riding No 14)
Race no.	Grand Prix	Pos.	Pts.	Heats	Draw No
1 /11	(Europe) European SGP	15	1	(1,0,0,0,0)	15
2 /11	(Sweden) Swedish SGP	3	9	(3,3,3,F,-)	4
3 /11	(Czech Republic) Czech Rep. SGP	12	6	(1,1,1,2,1)	4
4 /11	(Denmark) Danish SGP	14	5	(3,0,0,1,1)	3
5 /11	(United Kingdom) British SGP	15	3	(2,2,2,2,2) +2 +0	10
6 /11	(Italy) Italian SGP	3	17	(3,0,0,0,0)	9
7 /11	(Sweden) Scandinavian SGP	11	7	(2,0,1,2,2)	11
8 /11	(Poland) Polish SGP	4	12	(0,3,2,3,2) +2 +0	11
9 /11	(Denmark) Nordic SGP	11	6	(3,1,2,0,0)	4
10 /11	(Croatia) Croatian SGP	16	3	(1,0,0,1,1)	3
11 /11	(Poland) Polish II SGP	15	3	(0,1,1,1,0)	6

2012 Speedway Grand Prix Final Championship standings (Riding No 12)
Race no.	Grand Prix	Pos.	Pts.	Heats	Draw No
1 /12	New Zealand SGP	6	13	(3,2,2,3,2) +1	10
2 /12	(Europe) European SGP	14	4	(1,0,1,2,X)	10
3 /12	(Czech Republic) Czech Rep. SGP	8	6	(0,3,3,0,2) +1	4
4 /12	(Sweden) Swedish SGP	12	5	(3,0,1,0,1)	8
5 /12	(Denmark) Danish SGP	16	3	(2,0,0,1,0)	15
6 /12	(Poland) Polish SGP	12	6	(1,3,0,1,1)	4
7 /12	(Croatia) Croatian SGP	14	6	(0,0,1,2,3)	3
8 /12	(Italy) Italian SGP	1	16	(3,1,0,3,1) +2 +6	3
9 /12	(United Kingdom) British SGP	3	12	(3,0,2,2,1) +2 +2	2
10 /12	(Sweden) Scandinavian SGP	3	18	(1,3,3,3,3) +3 +2	12
11 /12	(Denmark) Nordic SGP	5	11	(3,3,1,3,1) +0	3
12 /12	(Poland) Polish II SGP	1	19	(2,3,3,3,0) +2 +6	11

2013 Speedway Grand Prix Final Championship standings (Riding No 6)
Race no.	Grand Prix	Pos.	Pts.	Heats	Draw No
1 /12	New Zealand SGP	13	6	(1,0,2,3,0)	16
2 /12	(Europe) European SGP	15	3	(0,2,0,1,0)	14
3 /12	(Sweden) Swedish SGP	10	8	(3,3,0,1,1)	13
4 /12	(Czech Republic) Czech Rep. SGP	13	5	(0,0,2,2,1)	13
5 /12	(United Kingdom) British SGP	16	1	(0,0,1,0,0)	7
6 /12	(Poland) Polish SGP	15	3	(2,0,0,1,0)	1
7 /12	(Denmark) Danish SGP	17	2	(0,0,1,0,1)	15
8 /12	(Italy) Italian SGP	10	6	(0,2,2,0,2)	13
9 /12	(Latvia) SGP	16	1	(1,0,0,0,T)	4
10 /12	(Slovenia) SGP	11	7	(0,2,3,1,1)	6
11 /12	(Sweden) Scandinavian SGP	13	3	(1,0,1,0,1)	3
12 /12	(Poland) Polish II SGP	10	6	(2,3,X,0,1)	15

permanent speedway rider
wild card, track reserve or qualified reserve
rider not classified (track reserve who did not start)

=== SGP Podiums ===
1. (Denmark) Copenhagen 2005 - 3rd place
2. (Czech Republic) Prague 2006 - 3rd place
3. (Latvia) Daugavpils 2006 - 2nd place
4. (Sweden) Gothenburg 2009 - 3rd place
5. (Sweden) Gothenburg 2011 - 3rd place
6. (Italy) Terenzano 2011 - 3rd place
7. (Italy) Terenzano 2012 - 1st place
8. (United Kingdom) Cardiff 2012 - 3rd place
9. (Sweden) Målilla 2012 - 3rd place
10. (Poland) Toruń 2012 - 1st place
11. (Sweden) Målilla 2015 - 3rd place
12. (United Kingdom) Cardiff 2016 - 1st place
13. (Sweden) Målilla 2017 - 2nd place

== See also ==
- List of Speedway Grand Prix riders
- Sweden national speedway team
