= Daniel Andersson (speedway rider) =

Swedish speedway rider

- Born: 27 September 1974 (age 52); Stockholm, Sweden
- Nationality: Swedish

Career history

Sweden
- 1992–1994: Getingarna
- 1995–1997: Indianerna
- 1998–2002: Smederna
- 2003: Team Bikab

Great Britain
- 1995: Oxford Cheetahs
- 1996: Cradley & Stoke Heathens
- 1998: Glasgow Tigers
- 2000: Belle Vue Aces
- 2001, 2002: Edinburgh Monarchs

Poland
- 1999: Rybnik
- 2000: Gdańsk

Individual honours
- 1995: World Under 21 runner-up

Team honours
- 1996: Speedway World Team Cup finalist

Daniel Jan Andersson (born 27 September 1974) also known as Dalle Andersson is a former international motorcycle speedway rider from Sweden. He earned one cap for the Sweden national speedway team.

== Career ==
Andersson was the Swedish Junior Champion during the 1994 Swedish speedway season. The following year in 1995, he finished runner-up in the Individual Speedway Junior World Championship. The final of the 1995 Individual Speedway Junior World Championship was held at the Ratinan Stadion in Tampere, Finland, and saw Andersson tie with Jason Crump with 13 points. In the run-off for the title Andersson fell on the first lap, leaving Crump to complete three laps on his own to be crowned the champion.

Andersson reached the final of the Speedway World Team Cup in the 1996 Speedway World Team Cup, he stood as reserve behind Stefan Dannö and Niklas Klingberg. He rode in the top tier of British Speedway from 1995 to 2002, riding for various clubs.

== World final appearances ==
=== World Team Cup ===
- 1996 - (Germany) Hofheim, Hesse (with Stefan Dannö / Niklas Klingberg) - 5th - 14pts
