= 2001 Swedish speedway season =

Motorcycle racing competition

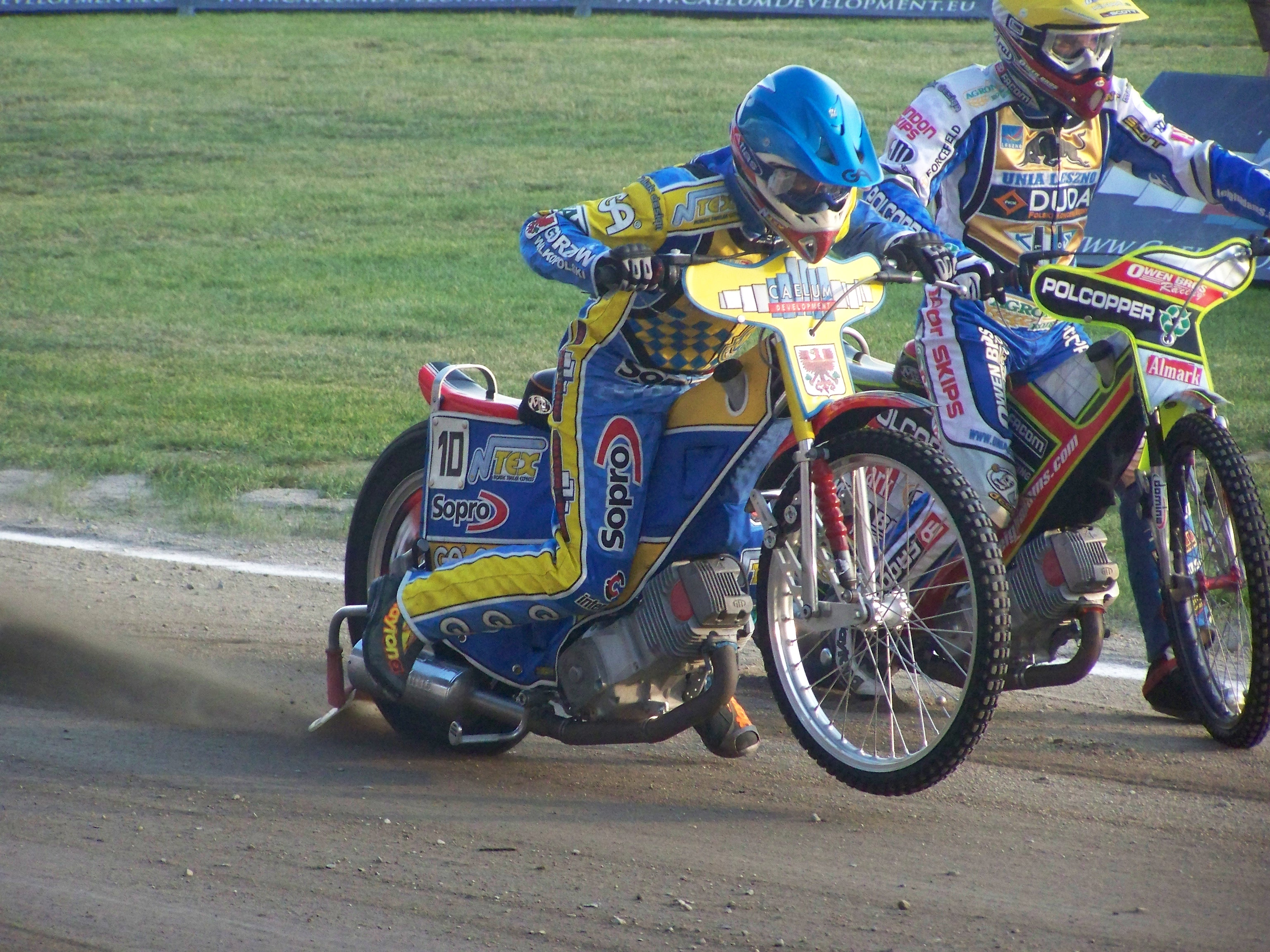
- David Ruud was the 2001 junior champion

The 2001 Swedish speedway season was the 2001 season of motorcycle speedway in Sweden.

== Individual ==
=== Individual Championship ===
The 2001 Swedish Individual Speedway Championship final was held in Avesta on 1 September. Tony Rickardsson won the Swedish Championship for the sixth time.

Pos	Rider	Team	Pts	Total
1	Tony Rickardsson	Masarna	(3,3,3,3,3)	15
2	Mikael Karlsson	Valsarna	(3,3,3,2,3)	14
3	Andreas Jonsson	Rospiggarna	(2,2,3,3,3)	13
4	Niklas Klingberg	Indianerna	(2,3,2,3,2)	12
5	Stefan Andersson	Team Svelux	(3,1,2,3,1)	10
6	Niklas Karlsson	Vargarna	(2,1,2,2,2)	9
7	Magnus Zetterström	Smederna	(2,0,1,2,3)	8
8	David Ruud	Lejonen	(0,3,0,2,2)	7
9	Peter Karlsson	Kaparna	(3,2,0,1,1)	7
10	Peter Nahlin	Smederna	(1,1,3,1,0)	6
11	Stefan Dannö	Valsarna	(1,2,1,1,1)	6
12	Peter I. Karlsson	Masarna	(1,0,2,0,2)	5
13	Niklas Aspgren	Masarna	(0,2,0,1,0)	3
14	Henrik Gustafsson	Indianerna	(1,0,1,0,1)	3
15	Patrick Dybeck	Indianerna	(0,0,1,0,0)	1
16	Claes Ivarsson	Vetlanda	(0,1,0,0,d)	1

Key

- points per race - 3 for a heat win, 2 for 2nd, 1 for third, 0 for last
- +3 won race off, +2 2nd in race off, +1, 3rd in race off, +0 last in race off
- ef - engine failure
- t - tape touching excluded
- u - fell
- w - excluded

=== U21 Championship ===
David Ruud won the U21 championship.

== Team ==
=== Team Championship ===
Rospiggarna won the Elitserien and were declared the winners of the Swedish Speedway Team Championship for the third time. The Rospiggarna team included Greg Hancock, Ryan Sullivan and Andreas Jonsson. The 2001 season saw the introduction of play offs to determine the Elitserien champions.

Örnarna won the Allsvenskan and Gasarna won the first division.

Elitserien
Pos	Team	Pts
1	Rospiggarna	37
2	Masarna	28
3	Västervik	28
4	Valsarna	26
5	Smederna	25
6	Team Svelux	25
7	Vargarna	17
8	Indianerna	16
9	Kaparna	12
10	Bysarna	10

Allsvenskan
Pos	Team	Pts
1	Örnarna	24
2	Lejonen	22
3	Vetlanda	20
4	Piraterna	12
5	Nässjö	6
6	Karlstad	6

Div 1
Pos	Team	Pts
1	Gasarna	20
2	Norbaggarna	14
3	Team Viking	12
4	Eldarna	6
5	Getingarna	4
6	Korparna	4

Play offs

Elitserien
Stage	Team	Team	Agg Score
SF	Masarna	Västervik	98:94
Final	Rospiggarna	Masarna	95:84

== See also ==
- Speedway in Sweden
