= Hans Andersen (speedway rider) =

Danish speedway rider

Hans Nørgaard Andersen
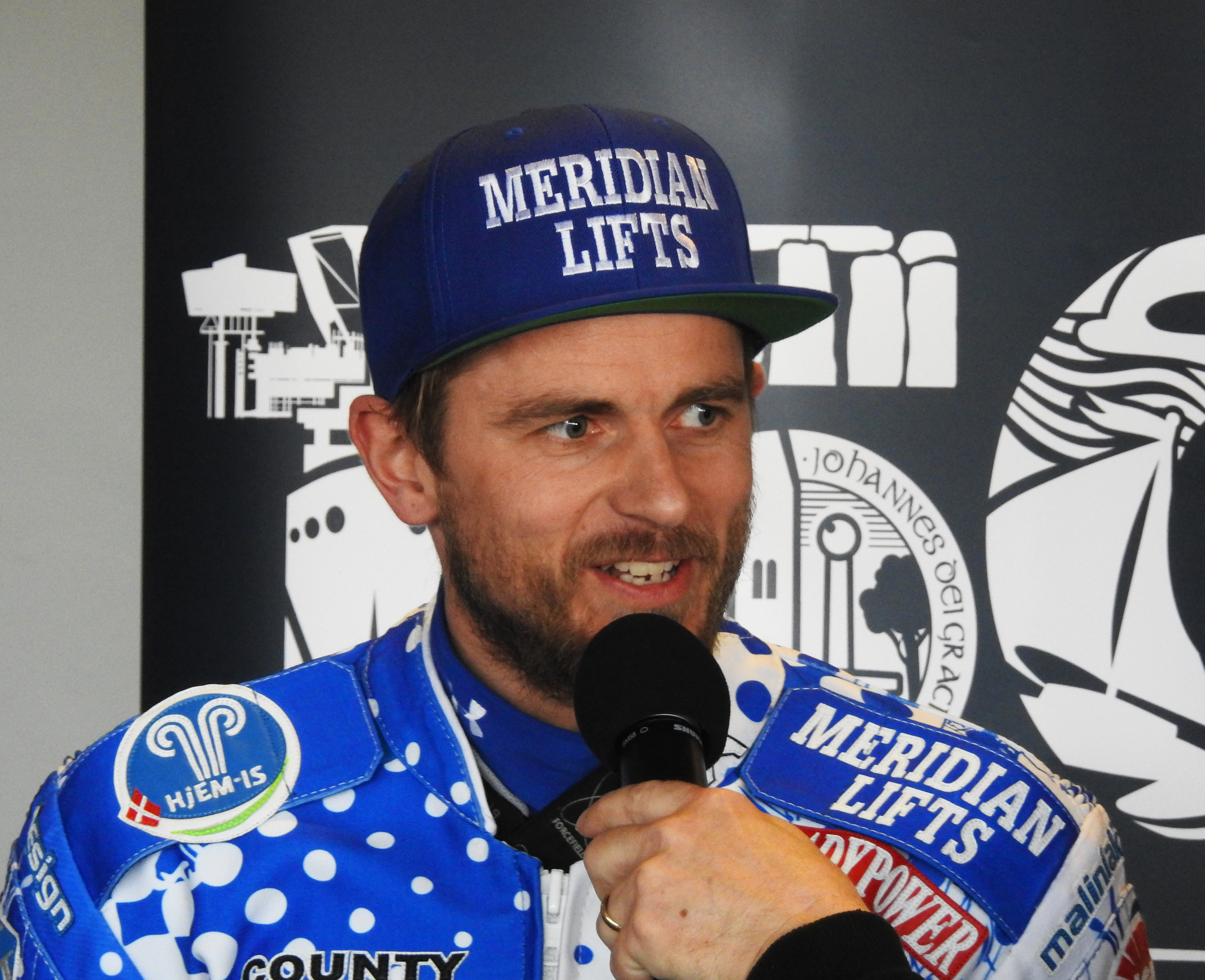
- Born: 3 November 1980 (age 46); Odense, Denmark
- Nationality: Danish

Career history

Denmark
- 2000–2003: Brovst
- 2007–2008, 2012–2013, 2022–2023: Fjelsted
- 2004–2005: Fredericia
- 2010–2011, 2021: Vojens/SES
- 2009: Slangerup
- 2014–2016: Munkebo
- 2017–2018: Region Varde
- 2019: Grindsted

Great Britain
- 2001–2002, 2009, 2016–2017: Poole Pirates
- 2003, 2006–2008, 2011, 2019, 2021–2023: Peterborough Panthers
- 2004–2005: Ipswich Witches
- 2008, 2011, 2014–2015: Coventry Bees
- 2010: Belle Vue Aces
- 2012–2013: Swindon Robins
- 2018, 2021: Leicester Lions
- 2022: Plymouth Gladiators
- 2023: Berwick Bandits

Poland
- 1999: Gniezno
- 2000: Opole
- 2001, 2011: Gorzów
- 2003: Motor Lublin
- 2005–2007: Wrocław
- 2008, 2010: Toruń
- 2009: Gdańsk
- 2012: Grudziądz
- 2013-2104: Bydgoszcz
- 2015-2020: Łódź
- 2021: Daugavpils
- 2023: Rawicz

Sweden
- 1998: Korparna
- 1999–2001: Team Svelux
- 2002–2011, 2015, 2018, 2020: Luxo Stars/Dackarna
- 2012: Indianerna
- 2013: Västervik
- 2016: Lejonen

Speedway Grand Prix statistics
- SGP number: 5
- Starts: 53
- Podiums: 13 (4-6-3)
- Finalist: 16 times
- Winner: 4 times

Individual honours
- 2007: Danish Champion
- 2004: Scandinavian Grand Prix Winner
- 2006: Danish Grand Prix Winner
- 2006: Czech Grand Prix Winner
- 2008: Italian Grand Prix Winner
- 2008: Golden Helmet of Pardubice (CZE)

Team honours
- 2006, 2008: World Cup Winner
- 2006: Elite League Champion
- 2001, 2002, 2008: Craven Shield Winner
- 2008, 2009: British Elite League Pairs Champion
- 2007: Swedish Elitserien Champion
- 1997, 2000, 2005, 2018: Danish League Champion
- 2002: Italian League Champion
- 1999: Swedish Allsvenskan Champion

Hans Nørgaard Andersen (born 3 November 1980, in Odense, Denmark) is a former motorcycle speedway rider, who captained the Denmark national speedway team that won the Speedway World Cup in 2006 and 2008.

== Career summary ==
Andersen was a Danish Junior Champion in 1996 and reached the final of the 1999 Speedway Under-21 World Championship, where he finished fourth. He began his British league career when he joined Poole Pirates for the 2001 Elite League speedway season. He spent 2002 with Poole before securing a move to Peterborough Panthers in 2003.

During 2004 and 2005, Andersen rode for Ipswich Witches and was an established member of the Danish national team as well as a regular rider in the Speedway Grand Prix. He won his first Grand Prix race during the 2004 Speedway Grand Prix, when he won the Speedway Grand Prix of Scandinavia. Despite being originally left out of the 2006 Speedway Grand Prix series, he replaced the retired Tony Rickardsson, eventually winning two Grand Prix meetings and finishing sixth in the final standings. He also became only the third rider to win a GP as a wild card.

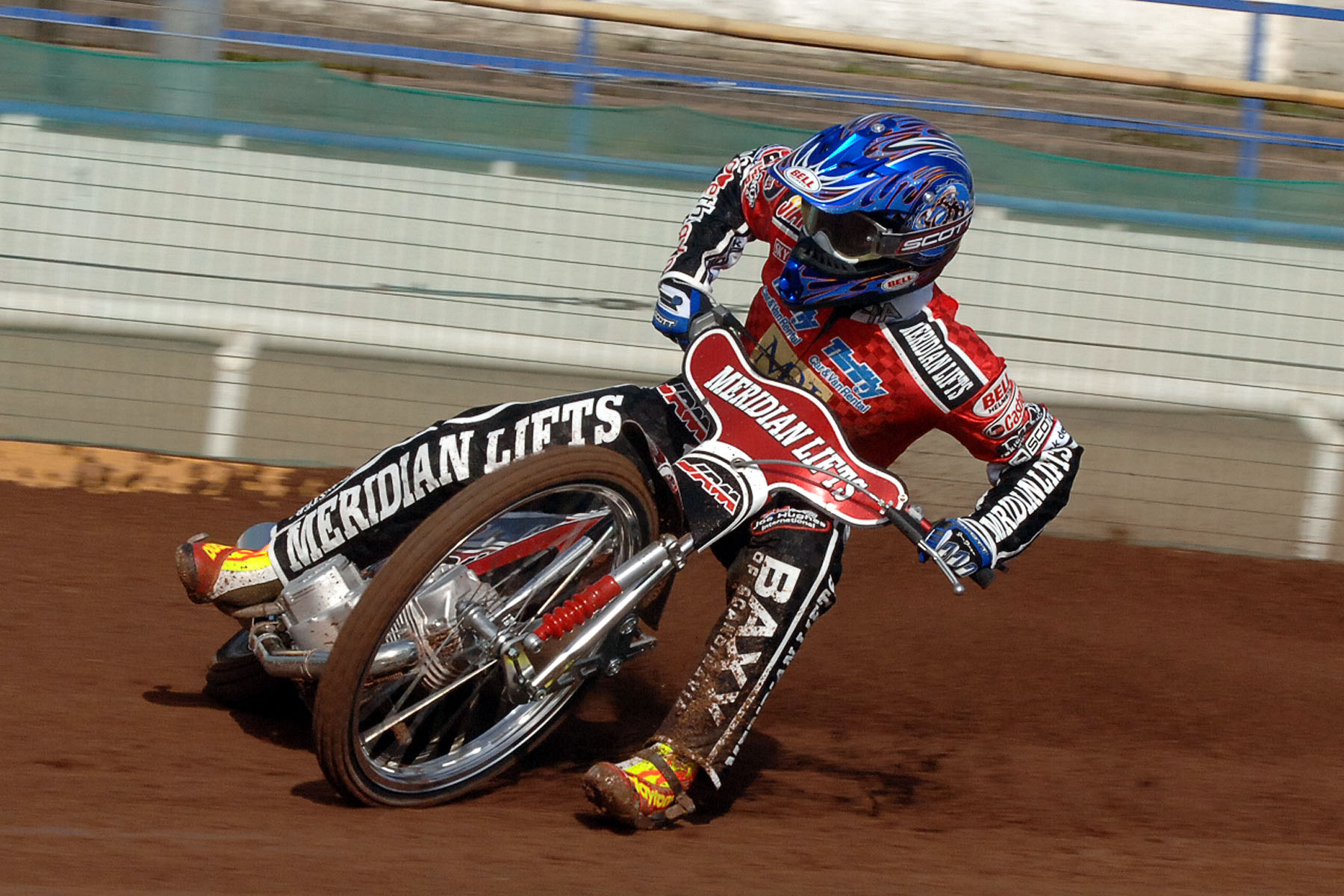
Andersen riding for Peterborough in 2007

In 2006, Andersen returned to Peterborough and impressed by recording a 10 plus average in both 2006 and 2007 for them. He won his first World Cup gold medal for Denmark when the team won the 2006 Speedway World Cup.

In 2007, Andersen became Danish National Champion for the first time. Andersen left his British club, Peterborough Panthers, mid-season in July 2008 after it emerged that the club had not paid him wages amounting to several thousand pounds. Shortly afterwards he signed for Coventry Bees and teamed up with Chris Harris to win the Elite League Pairs Championship. he won his fourth and final Grand Prix race during the 2008 Speedway Grand Prix, when he won the Speedway Grand Prix of Italy. He also won his second World Cup with Denmark after winning the 2008 Speedway World Cup.

Andersen rode for the Poole Pirates in 2009, and moved on to join the Belle Vue Aces for the 2010 season. He returned to the Peterborough Panthers team towards the end of the 2011 season, replacing Nicki Pedersen.

Andersen led Swindon Robins to Elite League glory in 2012, and on 28 January, he eventually was able to ride for the Wiltshire side again in 2013 following a winter-long battle with parent club Peterborough. In 2016, he signed for Poole Pirates, and he was with them again in 2017. He was with Leicester Lions in 2018 before riding with Peterborough in 2019.

In July 2021, Anderson re-signed for the Leicester Lions in the Championship. In 2022, he rode for Peterborough again, in the SGB Premiership 2022 and for the Plymouth Gladiators in the SGB Championship 2022 and signed again for Peterborough for the 2023 season. Unfortunately, his form dipped and Peterborough released him but shortly afterwards Berwick Bandits came in to sign him as an injury replacement.

Andersen announced his retirement on 30 January 2024.

== Major results ==
=== World individual Championship ===
- 2002 Speedway Grand Prix - 30th - 1 pt
- 2003 Speedway Grand Prix - 17th - 41 pts
- 2004 Speedway Grand Prix - 9th - 80 pts including (Scandinavian) grand prix win
- 2005 Speedway Grand Prix - 12th - 64 pts
- 2006 Speedway Grand Prix - 6th - 101 pts including (Denmark, and Czech Republic) grand prix wins
- 2007 Speedway Grand Prix - 5th - 107 pts
- 2008 Speedway Grand Prix - 5th - 139 pts including (Italian) grand prix win
- 2009 Speedway Grand Prix - 10th - 91 pts
- 2010 Speedway Grand Prix - 12th -86 pts
- 2012 Speedway Grand Prix - 10th -69 pts

=== World team Championships ===
- 2002 Speedway World Cup - 2nd
- 2003 Speedway World Cup - 3rd
- 2004 Speedway World Cup - 3rd
- 2005 Speedway World Cup - 3rd
- 2006 Speedway World Cup - Winner
- 2007 Speedway World Cup - 2nd
- 2008 Speedway World Cup - Winner
- 2009 Speedway World Cup - 6th
- 2010 Speedway World Cup - 2nd
- 2011 Speedway World Cup -
- 2013 Speedway World Cup -
- 2014 Speedway World Cup -
- 2016 Speedway World Cup -

== Speedway Grand Prix results ==
| Year | Position | Points | Best Finish | Notes |
|---|---|---|---|---|
| 2002 | 40th | 1 | 23rd | 1 ride only as a wild card |
| 2003 | 17th | 41 | 8th (twice) | |
| 2004 | 9th | 80 | Winner | Won Scandinavian GP |
| 2005 | 12th | 64 | 4th | |
| 2006 | 6th | 101 | Winner (twice) | Won Danish GP as a wild card and was promoted to full-time replacing Tony Rickardsson after his retirement during the season, later winning Czech GP. |
| 2007 | 5th | 107 | Second | |
| 2008 | 5th | 140 | Winner | Won in Italy, runner up at Czech, Scandinavian and German GP. Third in Slovenia. |
| 2009 | 10th | 91 | Second | |
| 2010 | 12th | 86 | 4th | |
| 2012 | 10th | 69 | 7th | |

2007 Speedway Grand Prix Final Championship standings (Riding No 6)
| Race no. | Grand Prix | Pos. | Pts. | Heats | Draw No |
|---|---|---|---|---|---|
| 1 /11 | (Italy) Italian SGP | 7 | 9 | (2,1,1,2,3) +0 | 1 |
| 2 /11 | (Europe) European SGP | 2 | 13 | (0,3,1,0,2) +3 +2 | 8 |
| 3 /11 | (Sweden) Swedish SGP | 2 | 20 | (3,2,3,3,2) +3 +2 | 5 |
| 4 /11 | (Denmark) Danish SGP | 5 | 12 | (3,3,1,2,3) +E | 9 |
| 5 /11 | (United Kingdom) British SGP | 5 | 13 | (3,3,3,2,1) +1 | 2 |
| 6 /11 | (Czech Republic) Czech Rep. SGP | 9 | 8 | (2,1,2,2,1) | 16 |
| 7 /11 | (Sweden) Scandinavian SGP | 4 | 12 | (3,1,1,3,2) +2 +0 | 8 |
| 8 /11 | (Latvia) Latvian SGP | 12 | 5 | (X,3,2,X,E) | 10 |
| 9 /11 | (Poland) Polish SGP | 16 | 3 | (2,X,0,1,0) | 4 |
| 10 /11 | (Slovenia) Slovenian SGP | 15 | 3 | (1,0,F,2,E) | 7 |
| 11 /11 | (Germany) German SGP | 7 | 9 | (3,2,3,0,1) +X | 6 |

2008 Speedway Grand Prix Final Championship standings (Riding No 5)
| Race no. | Grand Prix | Pos. | Pts. | Heats | Draw No |
|---|---|---|---|---|---|
| 1 /11 | (Slovenia) Slovenian SGP | 3 | 14 | (0,3,3,2,2) +2 +2 | 15 |
| 2 /11 | (Europe) European SGP | 10 | 6 | (0,1,3,1,1) | 12 |
| 3 /11 | (Sweden) Swedish SGP | 8 | 8 | (1,3,3,f,0) | 8 |
| 4 /11 | (Denmark) Danish SGP | 4 | 11 | (3,1,2,3,0) +2 +0 | 6 |
| 5 /11 | (United Kingdom) British SGP | 7 | 9 | (0,3,1,1,3) | 14 |
| 6 /11 | (Czech Republic) Czech Rep. SGP | 2 | 16 | (2,3,1,1,2) +3 +2 | 13 |
| 7 /11 | (Sweden) Scandinavian SGP | 2 | 20 | (3,3,3,3,1) +3 +2 | 2 |
| 8 /11 | (Latvia) Latvian SGP | 10 | 7 | (1,2,0,3,1) | 14 |
| 9 /11 | (Poland) Polish SGP | 5 | 10 | (1,2,3,2,1) +1 | 1 |
| 10 /11 | (Italy) Italian SGP | 1 | 21 | (3,2,3,2,2) +3 +6 | 16 |
| 11 /11 | (Germany) German SGP | 2 | 17 | (2,2,2,3,1) +3 +4 | 5 |

| permanent speedway rider |
| wild card, track reserve or qualified reserve |
| rider not classified (track reserve who did not start) |

== See also ==
- Denmark national speedway team
- List of Speedway Grand Prix riders
