= Jason Crump =

Australian speedway rider

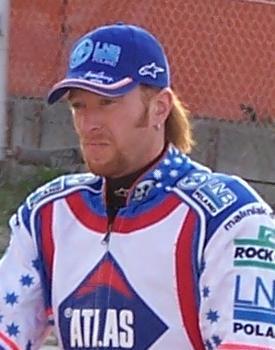
- Jason Crump in Bydgoszcz, 2006
- Born: 6 August 1975 (age 51); Bristol, England
- Nickname: Crumpy
- Nationality: Australian
- Website: official website

Career history

Great Britain
- 1991, 1994–1995, 2007: Poole Pirates
- 1992, 1996–1997, 1999: Peterborough Panthers
- 1993: Swindon Robins
- 1998: Oxford Cheetahs
- 2000–2001: King's Lynn Stars
- 2002–2006, 2008–2009: Belle Vue Aces
- 2020–2021: Ipswich Witches
- 2021: Plymouth Gladiators

Poland
- 1994, 1996, 2000–2001: Gorzów
- 1995, 1999, 2006–2010: Wrocław
- 1997–1998: Zielona Góra
- 2002: Piła
- 2003–2005: Toruń
- 2011–2012: Rzeszów

Sweden
- 1994: Getingarna
- 1995: Rospiggarna
- 1997–2005: Vargarna
- 2006–2012: Vetlanda

Denmark
- 1997-1998, 2011: Slangerup

Speedway Grand Prix statistics
- Starts: 145
- Podiums: 56 (23-19-14)
- Finalist: 77 times
- Winner: 23 times

Individual honours
- 2004, 2006, 2009: World Champion
- 1995: World Under-21 Champion
- 1995, 2007: Australian Champion
- 1990: Australian Under-16 Champion
- 1995, 1997, 1998, 2001, 2004: Queensland State Champion
- 1999, 2001, 2006, 2008: Elite League Riders' Champion
- 1999: Australian Masters Series 500 Champion
- 2002, 2006: Golden Helmet of Pardubice
- 2005, 2007, 2008: Edward Jancarz Memorial winner
- 2005, 2006: Peter Craven Memorial winner
- 1996: Australian Long Track Champion
- 2002: Australian Long track Grand Prix
- 2002, 2003, 2004, 2006: Golden Gala of Lonigo
- 1994: Wolverhampton Olympique

Team honours
- 1999: World Team Cup
- 2001, 2002: Speedway World Cup
- 1994, 1999: Elite League Champion
- 1999, 2000, 2005: Elite League KO Cup Winner
- 1994, 1997: Elite League Fours Champion
- 2006, 2007: Elite League Pairs Champion
- 1992: National League Champion
- 1992: National League KO Cup
- 2002: European Club Champion
- 1995, 1997: German Bundesliga Champion
- 1995, 2006, 2010, 2012: Swedish Elitserien Champion
- 1995, 2006: Polish Ekstraliga Champion

Jason Philip Crump (born 6 August 1975) is a former international motorcycle speedway rider from Australia (UK born). He is a three-time Speedway World Champion, and a World Cup winner.

In a 21-year career in Speedway, Crump finished with seven World Championship titles to his name (four individual, including the U/21 title, and three teams), making him one of the most successful Australian motorcycle racers of all time. He holds the all-time record for Grand Prix wins with 23.

== Family ==
Crump's father, Phil, is an Australian from the country town of Mildura and was riding for the Newport Wasps when Jason was born in Bristol, England. Phil, a four time Australian Solo Champion (1975, 1979, 1984 and 1988) and 13 time Victorian State Champion, finished third in the world championship in 1976 at the Silesian Stadium in Katowice (Poland) when British star Peter Collins won the title, and as part of the Australian team had won the 1976 Speedway World Team Cup Final at the White City Stadium in London. The Crump family had a home in Bristol while Phil was racing in the British League. Jason's maternal grandfather Neil Street was a former speedway rider and former long time manager of the Australian speedway team. Crump and his wife have two children.

== Career ==
After finishing second in both 1988 and 1989, Crump won his first major junior speedway title in 1990 becoming Australian Under-16 champion at the Bibra Lake Speedway in Perth, Western Australia. Crump began his European league career at the Poole Pirates in 1991, where his grandfather, Neil Street, was team manager.

Crump's best placing in the Australian Under-21 Championship was third in 1992 at the Riverview Speedway in Murray Bridge (South Australia) behind reigning Australian U/21 and senior champion Leigh Adams and second placed Jason Hawkes, making it an all-Mildura podium. Crump didn't place in the 1993 Australian U/21 Championship at his then home track, Olympic Park, and like a number of young Aussie riders was denied the chance to win the title when it was not contested in 1994 or 1995.

Just two weeks following his 19th birthday, Crump rode in his first World Final (1994) held at the Speedway Center in Vojens, Denmark, where he finished in 11th place with six points scored. After winning his opening ride, he failed to score in his next two races before finishing with a third and second placing. 1994 was notable as it was the last year the World Championship was decided in the traditional single meeting format.

Crump, after moving his home base from Mildura to Queensland in the mid-1990s, won the Queensland State Championship for the first time in 1995. He would go on to win it on five occasions (1995, 1997, 1998, 2001 and 2004). The same year saw Crump join his father Phil as an Australian Champion, when he won his first title at the Gosford Speedway, with the pair being the first (and only) father-son combination to win the title. Later that same year he made his Speedway Grand Prix debut as a wild card in the Speedway Grand Prix of Great Britain at the Hackney Wick Stadium in London – he won his first three rides, but fell in the B final to finish 8th overall.

Crump's first World Championship title arrived in 1995, when he won the Under-21 World Final at the Ratinan Stadion in Finland after defeating Swede Daniel Andersson in a run-off when both riders finished on 13 points. In the run-off, Andersson fell on the first lap, leaving Crump to complete three laps on his own to be crowned the champion. His previous U/21 World Finals had seen him as a reserve rider in the Czech Republic in 1993 (he did not get to ride), while he had finished third in 1994 in Norway.

Crump's first Grand Prix victory came in 1996, again riding at the British Grand Prix at Hackney Wick, although this time as a full-time Grand Prix rider. He has won the World Team Cup in 1999 in Pardubice and the new Speedway World Cup on two further occasions with the Australian team in 2001 in Wrocław, Poland and 2002 in Peterborough, England. In the 2001 World Cup, Crump became the first rider since the legendary Swede Ove Fundin in the inaugural Speedway World Team Cup in 1960 to go through the entire tournament (including qualification rounds) undefeated. Like their Australian Championship record as the only father and son to win the title, Jason Crump joined his dad as a World Team Cup winner by winning the 1999 Final in Pardubice in the Czech Republic.

Crump won the 'treble' riding for the Peterborough Panthers in Britain during the 1999 season, winning the Elite League, the Knockout Cup and the Craven Shield. Crump also won the 1999 Series 500 in Australia (also known as the Australian Masters Series).

Crump's first world title came in 2004 when he beat then 5-time champion Tony Rickardsson, having won two of the nine Grand Prix that season. He dominated the 2006 season winning four out of nine Grand Prix to take the title for the second time, beating American Greg Hancock into second place.

By winning the 2004 Speedway Grand Prix, Crump became Australia's first Individual World Champion since Jack Young and only the fourth Australian rider to win the World Championship. By becoming World Champion in 2004, Crump also became just the third rider after Per Jonsson and Gary Havelock to win both the Under-21 and Open Individual World Championships. He also became the first rider to win the Individual Under-21, Individual and Team World Championships.

Crump rode for the Belle Vue Aces for five seasons until the end of 2006 when, in 2007, Crump signed for the Poole Pirates in the Elite League. Also in 2007, he won his second Australian Championship. At the end of the 2007 season, Poole announced that Crump would be leaving the club due to the large points limit reduction made by the British Speedway Promoters' Association (BSPA) at their 2007 annual general meeting,

Crump returned to Belle Vue for 2008 and signed a two-year deal to stay with the club. However, in October 2008, Crump announced he will not be riding in the British Elite League in 2009 in order to reduce his fixture schedule, allowing him to concentrate on the Grand Prix series.

Crump returned to Belle Vue in August 2009 to assist with their relegation fight and KO Cup campaign. On 14 September 2009, Crump fell during a last heat decider for Belle Vue against Ipswich, sustaining injuries to his left arm and shoulder. In spite of this he finally won his third world title in 2009.

Crump announced his retirement from Grand Prix racing at the end of the 2012 season on 24 September 2012. In December 2012, he confirmed that he was retiring from the sport altogether due to a back injury. However, eight years after he announced his retirement, Crump returned to the sport. He joined Ipswich Witches for the SGB Premiership 2020 season.

Crump rode again for Ipswich in the SGB Premiership 2021 and the Plymouth Gladiators in the SGB Championship 2021, but finally retired for good in 2022 to take a team management role at the newly reformed Oxford Cheetahs.

== World Final Appearances ==
=== Individual World Championship ===
- 1994 - (Denmark) Vojens, Speedway Center - 11th - 6pts

=== World Team Cup/World Cup ===
- 1994 - (Germany) Brokstedt, Holsteinring Brokstedt (with Craig Boyce / Leigh Adams) - 4th - 17pts (0 - Did not ride)
- 1995 - (Poland) Bydgoszcz, Polonia Bydgoszcz Stadium (with Craig Boyce / Leigh Adams) - 5th - 14pts (8)
- 1999 - (Czech Republic) Pardubice, Svítkov Stadium (with Leigh Adams / Ryan Sullivan / Jason Lyons / Todd Wiltshire) - Winner - 40pts (13)
- 2000 - (England) Coventry, Brandon Stadium (with Leigh Adams / Ryan Sullivan / Todd Wiltshire / Craig Boyce) - 4th - 29pts (13)
- 2001 - (Poland) Wrocław, Olympic Stadium (with Leigh Adams / Todd Wiltshire / Craig Boyce / Ryan Sullivan) - Winner - 68pts (16)
- 2002 - Peterborough, East of England Showground (with Todd Wiltshire / Jason Lyons / Leigh Adams / Ryan Sullivan) - Winner - 64pts (17)
- 2003 - (Denmark) Vojens, Speedway Center (with Leigh Adams / Todd Wiltshire / Jason Lyons / Ryan Sullivan) - 2nd - 57pts (15)
- 2006 - (England) Reading, Smallmead Stadium (with Travis McGowan / Ryan Sullivan / Todd Wiltshire / Leigh Adams) - 4th - 35pts (12)
- 2007 - (Poland) Leszno, Alfred Smoczyk Stadium (with Ryan Sullivan / Leigh Adams / Chris Holder / Davey Watt / Rory Schlein) - 3rd - 29pts (9)
- 2008 - (Denmark) Vojens, Speedway Center (with Chris Holder / Leigh Adams / Ryan Sullivan / Davey Watt) - 4th - 21pts (3)
- 2009 - (Poland) Leszno, Alfred Smoczyk Stadium (with Davey Watt / Troy Batchelor / Chris Holder / Leigh Adams) - 2nd - 43pts (12)
- 2011 - (Poland) Gorzów, Edward Jancarz Stadium (with Darcy Ward / Troy Batchelor / Davey Watt / Chris Holder) - 2nd - 51pts (13)
- 2012 - (Sweden) Målilla, G&B Stadium (with Darcy Ward / Davey Watt / Chris Holder) - 2nd - 36pts (10)

=== Individual Under-21 World Championship ===
- 1993 - (Czech Republic) Pardubice, Svítkov Stadium - 16th - 0pts (Did not ride)
- 1994 - (Norway) Elgane, Elgane Speedway - 3rd - 12pts
- 1995 - (Finland) Tampere, Ratinan stadion - Winner - 13+3pts

== Major results ==
=== Speedway Grand Prix ===
Year	Position	Points	Best finish	Notes
1996	10th	45	Winner	Won British Grand Prix
1997	18th	8	10th	Only 1 ride – stand in for injured rider
1998	8th	62	Winner	Won British Grand Prix
1999	8th	66	3rd	Third in Czech Grand Prix
2000	4th	88	Winner	Won Swedish Grand Prix
2001	2nd	113	Winner	Won Polish and Swedish Grand Prix
2002	2nd	162	Winner	Won Czech Grand Prix
2003	2nd	144	Winner	Won Danish and Czech Grand Prix
2004	1st	158	Winner	Won Czech and Danish Grand Prix
2005	2nd	154	Winner	Won Swedish and Scandinavian Grand Prix
2006	1st	188	Winner	Won European, Swedish and British (in succession) and Italian Grand Prix
2007	3rd	124	3rd	Broken knee cap. Third in British, Scandinavian and German Grand Prix
2008	2nd	152	Winner	Won British and Latvian Grand Prix
2009	1st	159	Winner	Won European, Danish and British Grand Prix
2010	3rd	135	Winner	Won European Grand Prix
2011	4th	110	2nd	Second in Danish and Nordic Grand Prix
2012	6th	126	Winner	Won Danish Grand Prix

=== Grand Prix wins ===
- 1: 1996 Speedway Grand Prix of Great Britain
- 2: 1998 Speedway Grand Prix of Great Britain
- 3: 2000 Speedway Grand Prix of Sweden
- 4: 2001 Speedway Grand Prix of Poland
- 5: 2001 Speedway Grand Prix of Sweden
- 6: 2002 Speedway Grand Prix of Czech Republic
- 7: 2003 Speedway Grand Prix of Denmark
- 8: 2003 Speedway Grand Prix of Czech Republic
- 9: 2004 Speedway Grand Prix of Czech Republic
- 10: 2004 Speedway Grand Prix of Denmark
- 11: 2005 Speedway Grand Prix of Sweden
- 12: 2005 Speedway Grand Prix of Scandinavia
- 13: 2006 Speedway Grand Prix of Europe
- 14: 2006 Speedway Grand Prix of Sweden
- 15: 2006 Speedway Grand Prix of Great Britain
- 16: 2006 Speedway Grand Prix of Italy
- 17: 2008 Speedway Grand Prix of Great Britain
- 18: 2008 Speedway Grand Prix of Latvia
- 19: 2009 Speedway Grand Prix of Europe
- 20: 2009 Speedway Grand Prix of Denmark
- 21: 2009 Speedway Grand Prix of Great Britain
- 22: 2010 Speedway Grand Prix of Europe
- 23: 2012 Speedway Grand Prix of Denmark

=== World Longtrack Championship ===
One Day Finals

- 1993 (Germany) Mühldorf (RNS)
- 1994 (Czech Republic) Mariánské Lázně (13th) 5pts
- 1995 (Germany) Scheeßel (7th) 17pts
- 1996 (Germany) Herxheim (9th) 8pts

Grand-Prix Appearance

- 2004 1 app (20th) 12pts

== See also ==
- List of Speedway Grand Prix riders

== Bibliography ==
- Flack, Darryl (30 August 2023). The Immortals of Australian Motorcycle Racing: The World Champs (Part of the 7-volume comprehensive sports collection). Immortals of Australian Sport (7-book series). Gelding Street Press. ISBN 978-0-6452070-5-7.
