= 2016 Speedway Grand Prix of Poland III =

Motorcycle race

2016 Speedway Grand Prix of Poland
- 2016 Toruń FIM Speedway Grand Prix

Information
- Date: 1 October 2016
- City: (Poland) Toruń
- Event: 10 of 11
- Referee: (United Kingdom) Craig Ackroyd

Stadium details
- Stadium: Rose MotoArena
- Capacity: 15,500
- Length: 325 m (355 yd)

SGP Results
- Best Time: (in Heat 4)
- (gold) Winner: (Denmark) Niels Kristian Iversen
- (silver) Runner-up: (United States) Greg Hancock
- (bronze) 3rd place: (Poland) Bartosz Zmarzlik

The 2016 FST Grupa Brokerska Toruń FIM Speedway Grand Prix was the tenth race of the 2016 Speedway Grand Prix season. It took place on 1 October at the Rose MotoArena in Toruń, Poland.

== Riders ==
The Speedway Grand Prix Commission nominated Paweł Przedpełski as the wild card, and Kacper Woryna and Oskar Bober both as Track Reserves. Second series reserve Michael Jepsen Jensen replaced the injured Nicki Pedersen.

== Results ==
The Grand Prix was won by Niels Kristian Iversen, who beat Greg Hancock, Bartosz Zmarzlik and Matej Žagar in the final. It was Iversen's first win of the season. World championship leader Jason Doyle was injured in the third heat and took no further part in the meeting, meaning Hancock took the overall lead.

=== Heat details ===
Placing	Draw	Rider	Total	1	2	3	4	5	6	7	8	9	10	11	12	13	14	15	16	17	18	19	20	Pts	Pos	21	22	23
Gold	16	(Denmark) (88) Niels Kristian Iversen	15				1				3	2						2			2			10	5		2	3
Silver	3	(United States) (45) Greg Hancock	16	3						3				2				1				2		11	2		3	2
Bronze	8	(Poland) (95) Bartosz Zmarzlik	13		0						2			3			1			3				9	6	3		1
4	5	(Slovenia) (55) Matej Žagar	15		3			3					1					3					3	13	1	2		0
5	14	(Australia) (23) Chris Holder	11				3		2					1		3							1	10	4	1
6	6	(Denmark) (52) Michael Jepsen Jensen	10		1				0			3							3			3		10	3		0
7	2	(Poland) (777) Piotr Pawlicki Jr.	10	1					1				2				2				3			9	8		1
8	11	(Sweden) (66) Fredrik Lindgren	9			2				2		0					3						2	9	7	0
9	10	(Poland) (16) Paweł Przedpełski	8			3			3						2			0		0				8	9
10	15	(United Kingdom) (108) Tai Woffinden	8				2			0			3						1	2				8	10
11	1	(Sweden) (100) Andreas Jonsson	7	2				1				1				2				1				7	11
12	13	(Poland) (71) Maciej Janowski	5				0	2							3		0					0		5	12
13	7	(Sweden) (85) Antonio Lindbäck	5		2					1					1	0					1			5	13
14	12	(United Kingdom) (37) Chris Harris	3			0					1		0			1						1		3	14
15	4	(Denmark) (25) Peter Kildemand	2	0							0				0				2				0	2	15
16	9	(Australia) (69) Jason Doyle	0			0																		0	16
Placing	Draw	Rider	Total	1	2	3	4	5	6	7	8	9	10	11	12	13	14	15	16	17	18	19	20	Pts	Pos	21	22	23

e: retired or mechanical failure • m: exclusion for exceeding two minute time allowance • t: exclusion for touching the tapes • x: other exclusion • f: fell
ns: non-starter • nc: non-classify
Semi-finals: Heat 21: Riders placed 1st, 4th, 6th & 7th in the intermediate classification (after 20 heats)
Heat 22: Riders placed 2nd, 3rd, 5th & 8th in the intermediate classification (after 20 heats)
Big Final (heat 23): The first and second placed riders in each of the Semi-Finals

gate A – inside	gate B	gate C	gate D – outside

== The intermediate classification ==
Qualifies for next season's Grand Prix series
Full-time Grand Prix rider
Wild card, track reserve or qualified reserve

Pos.	Rider	Points	SVN (Slovenia)	POL (Poland)	DEN (Denmark)	CZE (Czech Republic)	GBR (United Kingdom)	SWE (Sweden)	PL2 (Poland)	GER (Germany)	SCA (Sweden)	PL3 (Poland)	AUS (Australia)
Gold	(United States) (45) Greg Hancock	134	10	14	14	18	10	17	11	15	9	16	
Silver	(Australia) (69) Jason Doyle	123	13	5	7	17	12	17	16	17	19	0	
Bronze	(United Kingdom) (108) Tai Woffinden	115	10	14	15	9	15	8	15	10	11	8	
4	(Poland) (95) Bartosz Zmarzlik	113	8	10	7	13	13	10	14	13	12	13	
5	(Australia) (23) Chris Holder	109	14	12	13	5	6	12	15	8	13	11	
6	(Poland) (777) Piotr Pawlicki Jr.	91	8	4	5	6	14	13	10	11	10	10	
7	(Poland) (71) Maciej Janowski	85	10	10	16	5	11	12	6	2	8	5	
8	(Sweden) (66) Fredrik Lindgren	82	7	12	2	11	2	8	11	6	14	9	
9	(Denmark) (88) Niels Kristian Iversen	79	8	4	7	11	3	8	5	11	7	15	
9	(Sweden) (85) Antonio Lindbäck	79	10	10	10	5	18	7	4	6	4	5	
9	(Slovenia) (55) Matej Žagar	79	4	14	8	5	8	3	4	3	15	15	
12	(Denmark) (25) Peter Kildemand	64	15	6	7	6	4	9	3	6	6	2	
13	(Denmark) (3) Nicki Pedersen	62	10	4	10	8	5	6	12	7	–	–	
14	(Sweden) (100) Andreas Jonsson	46	6	8	8	6	9	2	0	–	–	7	
15	(United Kingdom) (37) Chris Harris	36	3	3	4	10	1	2	4	6	0	3	
16	(Denmark) (52) Michael Jepsen Jensen	21	–	–	–	–	–	–	–	7	4	10	
17	(Poland) (16) Patryk Dudek	8	–	8	–	–	–	–	–	–	–	–	
17	(Germany) (16) Martin Smolinski	8	–	–	–	–	–	–	–	8	–	–	
17	(Poland) (16) Paweł Przedpełski	8	–	–	–	–	–	–	–	–	–	8	
20	(United Kingdom) (16) Danny King	7	–	–	–	–	7	–	–	–	–	–	
20	(Poland) (16) Krzysztof Kasprzak	7	–	–	–	–	–	–	7	–	–	–	
21	(Denmark) (16) Anders Thomsen	5	–	–	5	–	–	–	–	–	–	–	
21	(Sweden) (17) Kim Nilsson	5	–	–	–	–	–	–	–	–	5	–	
23	(Sweden) (16) Peter Ljung	4	–	–	–	–	–	4	–	–	–	–	
24	(Czech Republic) (16) Václav Milík Jr.	3	–	–	–	3	–	–	–	–	–	–	
25	(Germany) (17) Tobias Kroner	2	–	–	–	–	–	–	–	2	–	–	
26	(Slovenia) (16) Denis Štojs	1	1	–	–	–	–	–	–	–	–	–	
26	(Slovenia) (17) Nick Škorja	1	1	–	–	–	–	–	–	–	–	–	
26	(Poland) (17) Daniel Kaczmarek	1	–	–	–	–	–	–	1	–	–	–	
26	(Sweden) (16) Jacob Thorsell	1	–	–	–	–	–	–	–	–	1	–	
26	(Poland) (17) Kacper Woryna	1	–	–	–	–	–	–	–	–	–	1	
31	(Slovenia) (18) Matic Ivačič	0	0	–	–	–	–	–	–	–	–	–	
31	(Poland) (18) Oskar Bober	0	–	–	–	–	–	–	–	–	–	0	
Pos.	Rider	Points	SVN (Slovenia)	POL (Poland)	DEN (Denmark)	CZE (Czech Republic)	GBR (United Kingdom)	SWE (Sweden)	PL2 (Poland)	GER (Germany)	SCA (Sweden)	PL3 (Poland)	AUS (Australia)

== See also ==
- motorcycle speedway
