= 2016 Speedway Grand Prix of Scandinavia =

Motorcycle race

(Sweden) 2016 Speedway Grand Prix of Scandinavia
- 2016 Stockholm FIM Speedway Grand Prix

Information
- Date: 24 September 2016
- City: (Sweden) Stockholm
- Event: 9 of 11
- Referee: (Denmark) Jesper Steentoft

Stadium details
- Stadium: Friends Arena
- Capacity: 34,000
- Length: 272 m (297 yd)

SGP Results
- Best Time
- (gold) Winner: (Australia) Jason Doyle
- (silver) Runner-up: (Australia) Chris Holder
- (bronze) 3rd place: (Sweden) Fredrik Lindgren

The 2016 Stockholm FIM Speedway Grand Prix was the ninth race of the 2016 Speedway Grand Prix season. It took place on 24 September at the Friends Arena in Stockholm, Sweden.

== Riders ==
The Speedway Grand Prix Commission nominated Jacob Thorssell as the wild card, and Peter Ljung and Linus Sundström both as Track Reserves. Second series reserve Michael Jepsen Jensen replaced the injured Nicki Pedersen, while Kim Nilsson replaced the injured Andreas Jonsson.

== Results ==
The Grand Prix was won by Jason Doyle, who beat Chris Holder, Fredrik Lindgren and Matej Žagar in the final. It was Doyle's third successive Grand Prix win and, as a result, he took the lead in the world championship standings. Former series leader Greg Hancock, who was eliminated in the semi-finals, was five points back in second place with defending world champion Tai Woffinden in third.

=== Heat details ===
Placing	Draw	Rider	Total	1	2	3	4	5	6	7	8	9	10	11	12	13	14	15	16	17	18	19	20	Pts	Pos	21	22	23
Gold	14	(Australia) (69) Jason Doyle	19				2		3					3		2							3	13	1	3		3
Silver	6	(Australia) (23) Chris Holder	13		1				0			3							3			2		9	7	2		2
Bronze	5	(Sweden) (66) Fredrik Lindgren	14		3			2					2					2					2	11	5		2	1
4	13	(Slovenia) (55) Matej Žagar	15				3	3							3		2					1		12	2		3	0
5	7	(Poland) (95) Bartosz Zmarzlik	12		2					1					2	3					3			11	4	1
6	3	(United Kingdom) (108) Tai Woffinden	11	2						2				1				3				3		11	3		0
7	15	(Poland) (777) Piotr Pawlicki Jr.	10				1			3			1						2	3				10	6	0
8	12	(United States) (45) Greg Hancock	9			3					1		3			1						0		8	8		1
9	1	(Poland) (71) Maciej Janowski	8	3				1				2				0				2				8	9
10	8	(Denmark) (88) Niels Kristian Iversen	7		0						3			0			3			1				7	10
11	9	(Denmark) (25) Peter Kildemand	6			1		2						0					1		2			6	11
12	2	(Sweden) (17) Kim Nilsson	5	1					2				0				1				1			5	12
13	4	(Sweden) (85) Antonio Lindbäck	5	0							2				1				0				2	5	13
14	10	(Denmark) (52) Michael Jepsen Jensen	4			2			1						0			1		0				4	14
15	16	(Sweden) (16) Jacob Thorssell	1				0				0	1						0			0			1	15
16	11	(United Kingdom) (37) Chris Harris	0			0				0		0					0						0	0	16
Placing	Draw	Rider	Total	1	2	3	4	5	6	7	8	9	10	11	12	13	14	15	16	17	18	19	20	Pts	Pos	21	22	23

e: retired or mechanical failure • m: exclusion for exceeding two minute time allowance • t: exclusion for touching the tapes • x: other exclusion • f: fell
ns: non-starter • nc: non-classify
Semi-finals: Heat 21: Riders placed 1st, 4th, 6th & 7th in the intermediate classification (after 20 heats)
Heat 22: Riders placed 2nd, 3rd, 5th & 8th in the intermediate classification (after 20 heats)
Big Final (heat 23): The first and second placed riders in each of the Semi-Finals

gate A – inside	gate B	gate C	gate D – outside

== The intermediate classification ==
Qualifies for next season's Grand Prix series
Full-time Grand Prix rider
Wild card, track reserve or qualified reserve

Pos.	Rider	Points	SVN (Slovenia)	POL (Poland)	DEN (Denmark)	CZE (Czech Republic)	GBR (United Kingdom)	SWE (Sweden)	PL2 (Poland)	GER (Germany)	SCA (Sweden)	PL3 (Poland)	AUS (Australia)
Gold	(Australia) (69) Jason Doyle	123	13	5	7	17	12	17	16	17	19		
Silver	(United States) (45) Greg Hancock	118	10	14	14	18	10	17	11	15	9		
Bronze	(United Kingdom) (108) Tai Woffinden	107	10	14	15	9	15	8	15	10	11		
4	(Poland) (95) Bartosz Zmarzlik	100	8	10	7	13	13	10	14	13	12		
5	(Australia) (23) Chris Holder	98	14	12	13	5	6	12	15	8	13		
6	(Poland) (777) Piotr Pawlicki Jr.	81	8	4	5	6	14	13	10	11	10		
7	(Poland) (71) Maciej Janowski	80	10	10	16	5	11	12	6	2	8		
8	(Sweden) (85) Antonio Lindbäck	74	10	10	10	5	18	7	4	6	4		
9	(Sweden) (66) Fredrik Lindgren	73	7	12	2	11	2	8	11	6	14		
10	(Slovenia) (55) Matej Žagar	64	4	14	8	5	8	3	4	3	15		
11	(Denmark) (88) Niels Kristian Iversen	64	8	4	7	11	3	8	5	11	7		
12	(Denmark) (25) Peter Kildemand	62	15	6	7	6	4	9	3	6	6		
13	(Denmark) (3) Nicki Pedersen	62	10	4	10	8	5	6	12	7	–		
14	(Sweden) (100) Andreas Jonsson	39	6	8	8	6	9	2	0	–	–		
15	(United Kingdom) (37) Chris Harris	33	3	3	4	10	1	2	4	6	0		
16	(Denmark) (52) Michael Jepsen Jensen	11	–	–	–	–	–	–	–	7	4		
17	(Poland) (16) Patryk Dudek	8	–	8	–	–	–	–	–	–	–		
18	(Germany) (16) Martin Smolinski	8	–	–	–	–	–	–	–	8	–		
19	(United Kingdom) (16) Danny King	7	–	–	–	–	7	–	–	–	–		
20	(Poland) (16) Krzysztof Kasprzak	7	–	–	–	–	–	–	7	–	–		
21	(Denmark) (16) Anders Thomsen	5	–	–	5	–	–	–	–	–	–		
22	(Sweden) (17) Kim Nilsson	5	–	–	–	–	–	–	–	–	5		
22	(Sweden) (16) Peter Ljung	4	–	–	–	–	–	4	–	–	–		
23	(Czech Republic) (16) Václav Milík Jr.	3	–	–	–	3	–	–	–	–	–		
24	(Germany) (17) Tobias Kroner	2	–	–	–	–	–	–	–	2	–		
25	(Slovenia) (16) Denis Štojs	1	1	–	–	–	–	–	–	–	–		
26	(Slovenia) (17) Nick Škorja	1	1	–	–	–	–	–	–	–	–		
27	(Poland) (17) Daniel Kaczmarek	1	–	–	–	–	–	–	1	–	–		
28	(Sweden) (16) Jacob Thorsell	1	–	–	–	–	–	–	–	–	1		
29	(Slovenia) (18) Matic Ivačič	0	0	–	–	–	–	–	–	–	–		
Pos.	Rider	Points	SVN (Slovenia)	POL (Poland)	DEN (Denmark)	CZE (Czech Republic)	GBR (United Kingdom)	SWE (Sweden)	PL2 (Poland)	GER (Germany)	SCA (Sweden)	PL3 (Poland)	AUS (Australia)

== See also ==
- motorcycle speedway
