= 2016 Speedway Grand Prix of Germany =

Motorcycle race

- 2016 German FIM Speedway Grand Prix

Information
- Date: 10 September 2016
- City: (Germany) Teterow
- Event: 8 of 11
- Referee: (Sweden) Krister Gardell

Stadium details
- Stadium: Bergring Arena

SGP Results
- Best Time: (in Heat 4)
- (gold) Winner: (Australia) Jason Doyle
- (silver) Runner-up: (Poland) Bartosz Zmarzlik
- (bronze) 3rd place: (United States) Greg Hancock

The 2016 German FIM Speedway Grand Prix was the eighth race of the 2016 Speedway Grand Prix season. It took place on 10 September at the Bergring Arena in Teterow, Germany. It was the 200th Speedway Grand Prix staged.

== Riders ==
The Speedway Grand Prix Commission nominated Martin Smolinski as the wild card, and Tobias Kroner and Kai Huckenbeck both as Track Reserves. It was also Chris Harris' 100th Grand Prix of his career.

== Results ==
The Grand Prix was won by Jason Doyle, who beat Bartosz Zmarzlik, Greg Hancock and Niels-Kristian Iversen in the final. As a result, Doyle closed the lead on Hancock in the world championship standings to five points, with defending world champion Tai Woffinden, who was eliminated in the semi-finals, sitting eight points further back in third.

=== Heat details ===
Placing	Draw	Rider	Total	1	2	3	4	5	6	7	8	9	10	11	12	13	14	15	16	17	18	19	20	Pts	Pos	21	22	23
Gold	7	(Australia) (69) Jason Doyle	17		3					3					3	3					0			12	1	2		3
Silver	16	(Poland) (95) Bartosz Zmarzlik	13				2				2	1						2			2			9	5		2	2
Bronze	6	(United States) (45) Greg Hancock	15		0				3			2							3			3		11	3		3	1
4	11	(Denmark) (88) Niels Kristian Iversen	11			0				2		3					3						0	8	6	3		0
5	5	(Poland) (777) Piotr Pawlicki Jr.	11		t			3					3					3					2	11	2		0
6	10	(United Kingdom) (108) Tai Woffinden	10			3			1						2			1		2				9	4	1
7	1	(Germany) (16) Martin Smolinski	8	3				0				0				1				3				7	8		1
8	15	(Australia) (23) Chris Holder	8				3			0			2						2	1				8	7	0
9	14	(Denmark) (52) Michael Jepsen Jensen	7				1		2					3		0							1	7	9
10	12	(Denmark) (3) Nicki Pedersen	7			1					1		1			2						2		7	10
11	4	(Sweden) (85) Antonio Lindbäck	6	0							3				0				0				3	6	11
12	2	(Denmark) (25) Peter Kildemand	6	2					0				0				1				3			6	12
13	13	(United Kingdom) (37) Chris Harris	6				0	2							1		2					1		6	13
14	9	(Sweden) (66) Fredrik Lindgren	6			2		1						1					1		1			6	14
15	8	(Slovenia) (55) Matej Žagar	3		1						0			2			0			0				3	15
16	3	(Poland) (71) Maciej Janowski	2	1						1				0				0				0		2	16
17	17	(Germany) (17) Tobias Kroner	2																					2	17
Placing	Draw	Rider	Total	1	2	3	4	5	6	7	8	9	10	11	12	13	14	15	16	17	18	19	20	Pts	Pos	21	22	23

e: retired or mechanical failure • m: exclusion for exceeding two minute time allowance • t: exclusion for touching the tapes • x: other exclusion • f: fell
ns: non-starter • nc: non-classify
Semi-finals: Heat 21: Riders placed 1st, 4th, 6th & 7th in the intermediate classification (after 20 heats)
Heat 22: Riders placed 2nd, 3rd, 5th & 8th in the intermediate classification (after 20 heats)
Big Final (heat 23): The first and second placed riders in each of the Semi-Finals

gate A – inside	gate B	gate C	gate D – outside

== The intermediate classification ==
Qualifies for next season's Grand Prix series
Full-time Grand Prix rider
Wild card, track reserve or qualified reserve

Pos.	Rider	Points	SVN (Slovenia)	POL (Poland)	DEN (Denmark)	CZE (Czech Republic)	GBR (United Kingdom)	SWE (Sweden)	PL2 (Poland)	GER (Germany)	SCA (Sweden)	PL3 (Poland)	AUS (Australia)
	(United States) (45) Greg Hancock	—	10	14	14	18	10	17	11	15			
Silver	(Australia) (69) Jason Doyle	104	13	5	7	17	12	17	16	17			
Bronze	(United Kingdom) (108) Tai Woffinden	96	10	14	15	9	15	8	15	10			
4	(Poland) (95) Bartosz Zmarzlik	88	8	10	7	13	13	10	14	13			
5	(Australia) (23) Chris Holder	85	14	12	13	5	6	12	15	8			
6	(Poland) (71) Maciej Janowski	72	10	10	16	5	11	12	6	2			
7	(Poland) (777) Piotr Pawlicki Jr.	71	8	4	5	6	14	13	10	11			
8	(Sweden) (85) Antonio Lindbäck	70	10	10	10	5	18	7	4	6			
9	(Denmark) (3) Nicki Pedersen	62	10	4	10	8	5	6	12	7			
10	(Sweden) (66) Fredrik Lindgren	59	7	12	2	11	2	8	11	6			
11	(Denmark) (88) Niels Kristian Iversen	57	8	4	7	11	3	8	5	11			
12	(Denmark) (25) Peter Kildemand	56	15	6	7	6	4	9	3	6			
13	(Slovenia) (55) Matej Žagar	49	4	14	8	5	8	3	4	3			
14	(Sweden) (100) Andreas Jonsson	39	6	8	8	6	9	2	0	–			
15	(United Kingdom) (37) Chris Harris	33	3	3	4	10	1	2	4	6			
16	(Poland) (16) Patryk Dudek	8	–	8	–	–	–	–	–	–			
17	(Germany) (16) Martin Smolinski	8	–	–	–	–	–	–	–	8			
18	(Denmark) (52) Michael Jepsen Jensen	7	–	–	–	–	–	–	–	7			
19	(United Kingdom) (16) Danny King	7	–	–	–	–	7	–	–	–			
20	(Poland) (16) Krzysztof Kasprzak	7	–	–	–	–	–	–	7	–			
21	(Denmark) (16) Anders Thomsen	5	–	–	5	–	–	–	–	–			
22	(Sweden) (16) Peter Ljung	4	–	–	–	–	–	4	–	–			
23	(Czech Republic) (16) Václav Milík Jr.	3	–	–	–	3	–	–	–	–			
24	(Germany) (17) Tobias Kroner	2	–	–	–	–	–	–	–	2			
25	(Slovenia) (16) Denis Štojs	1	1	–	–	–	–	–	–	–			
26	(Slovenia) (17) Nick Škorja	1	1	–	–	–	–	–	–	–			
27	(Poland) (17) Daniel Kaczmarek	1	–	–	–	–	–	–	1	–			
28	(Slovenia) (18) Matic Ivačič	0	0	–	–	–	–	–	–	–			
Pos.	Rider	Points	SVN (Slovenia)	POL (Poland)	DEN (Denmark)	CZE (Czech Republic)	GBR (United Kingdom)	SWE (Sweden)	PL2 (Poland)	GER (Germany)	SCA (Sweden)	PL3 (Poland)	AUS (Australia)

== See also ==
- motorcycle speedway
