= 2016 Speedway Grand Prix of Australia =

Motorcycle race

- 2016 Australian FIM Speedway Grand Prix

Information
- Date: 22 October 2016
- City: (Australia) Melbourne
- Event: 11 of 11
- Referee: (Sweden) Krister Gardell

Stadium details
- Stadium: Etihad Stadium
- Capacity: 42,000
- Length: 346 m (378 yd)

SGP Results
- Best Time: (in Heat 4)
- (gold) Winner: (Australia) Chris Holder
- (silver) Runner-up: (United Kingdom) Tai Woffinden
- (bronze) 3rd place: (Poland) Bartosz Zmarzlik

The 2016 QBE Insurance Australian FIM Speedway Grand Prix was the eleventh and final race of the 2016 Speedway Grand Prix season. It took place on 22 October at the Etihad Stadium in Melbourne, Australia.

== Riders ==
The Speedway Grand Prix Commission nominated reigning Australian Champion Brady Kurtz as the wild card, with newly crowned Under-21 World Champion Max Fricke and Jack Holder, the younger brother of Chris Holder, as the Track Reserves. Second series reserve Michael Jepsen Jensen replaced injured Australian Jason Doyle, while 2016 Australian Championship runner-up Sam Masters replaced the man who he had clashed with in the 2015 event, injured triple World Champion Nicki Pedersen.

== Results ==
The Grand Prix was won by Australia's Chris Holder, who beat Tai Woffinden, Bartosz Zmarzlik and Antonio Lindbäck in the final. It was Holder's first SGP win of the season, and his first win in SGP since winning in Great Britain in his championship year of 2012. Holder's win also saw him overtake fellow Australian Jason Doyle for overall 4th place in the series. Greg Hancock was crowned world champion for the fourth time when he won heat four. Hancock would later cause controversy by pulling out of the meeting after he was excluded from 2nd place in heat nine. Woffinden finished second in the overall standings by claiming second place, with Zmarzlik and Holder in third and fourth respectively. The meeting also saw Piotr Pawlicki Jr., Lindbäck and Niels Kristian Iversen claim the final qualifying places for the 2017 season.

=== Heat details ===
Placing	Draw	Rider	Total	1	2	3	4	5	6	7	8	9	10	11	12	13	14	15	16	17	18	19	20	Pts	Pos	21	22	23
Gold	6	(Australia) (23) Chris Holder	17		2				3			3							3			0		11	3		3	3
Silver	3	(United Kingdom) (108) Tai Woffinden	15	3						0				2				3				3		11	2		2	2
Bronze	11	(Poland) (95) Bartosz Zmarzlik	15			3				3		1					3						2	12	1	2		1
4	14	(Sweden) (85) Antonio Lindbäck	14				1		2					3		2							3	11	4	3		0
5	9	(Denmark) (88) Niels Kristian Iversen	12			2		3						1					2		3			11	5		1
6	1	(Slovenia) (55) Matej Žagar	11	2				0				2				3				3				10	6	1
7	7	(Denmark) (52) Michael Jepsen Jensen	10		3					1					3	1					2			10	7	0
8	13	(Poland) (777) Piotr Pawlicki Jr.	8				2	2							t		2					2		8	8		0
9	4	(Sweden) (100) Andreas Jonsson	6	1							3				1				1				0	6	9
10	15	(Sweden) (66) Fredrik Lindgren	6				0			2			2						0	2				6	10
11	16	(United States) (45) Greg Hancock	5				3				2	0												5	11
12	5	(Poland) (71) Maciej Janowski	5		1			1					1					1					1	5	12
13	2	(Denmark) (25) Peter Kildemand	4	0					0				3				0				1			4	13
14	10	(United Kingdom) (37) Chris Harris	4			0			1						0			2		1				4	14
15	8	(Australia) (16) Brady Kurtz	2		0						1			m			1			0				2	15
16	12	(Australia) (17) Sam Masters	2			1					0		0			0						1		2	16
17	18	(Australia) (19) Jack Holder	2																					2	17
18	17	(Australia) (18) Max Fricke	0																					0	18
Placing	Draw	Rider	Total	1	2	3	4	5	6	7	8	9	10	11	12	13	14	15	16	17	18	19	20	Pts	Pos	21	22	23

e: retired or mechanical failure • m: exclusion for exceeding two minute time allowance • t: exclusion for touching the tapes • x: other exclusion • f: fell
ns: non-starter • nc: non-classify
Semi-finals: Heat 21: Riders placed 1st, 4th, 6th & 7th in the intermediate classification (after 20 heats)
Heat 22: Riders placed 2nd, 3rd, 5th & 8th in the intermediate classification (after 20 heats)
Big Final (heat 23): The first and second placed riders in each of the Semi-Finals

gate A – inside	gate B	gate C	gate D – outside

== Final classification ==
Qualifies for next season's Grand Prix series
Full-time Grand Prix rider
Wild card, track reserve or qualified reserve

Pos.	Rider	Points	SVN (Slovenia)	POL (Poland)	DEN (Denmark)	CZE (Czech Republic)	GBR (United Kingdom)	SWE (Sweden)	PL2 (Poland)	GER (Germany)	SCA (Sweden)	PL3 (Poland)	AUS (Australia)
Gold	(United States) (45) Greg Hancock	139	10	14	14	18	10	17	11	15	9	16	5
Silver	(United Kingdom) (108) Tai Woffinden	130	10	14	15	9	15	8	15	10	11	8	15
Bronze	(Poland) (95) Bartosz Zmarzlik	128	8	10	7	13	13	10	14	13	12	13	15
4	(Australia) (23) Chris Holder	126	14	12	13	5	6	12	15	8	13	11	17
5	(Australia) (69) Jason Doyle	123	13	5	7	17	12	17	16	17	19	0	–
6	(Poland) (777) Piotr Pawlicki Jr.	99	8	4	5	6	14	13	10	11	10	10	8
7	(Sweden) (85) Antonio Lindbäck	93	10	10	10	5	18	7	4	6	4	5	14
8	(Denmark) (88) Niels Kristian Iversen	91	8	4	7	11	3	8	5	11	7	15	12
9	(Poland) (71) Maciej Janowski	90	10	10	16	5	11	12	6	2	8	5	5
10	(Slovenia) (55) Matej Žagar	90	4	14	8	5	8	3	4	3	15	15	11
11	(Sweden) (66) Fredrik Lindgren	88	7	12	2	11	2	8	11	6	14	9	6
12	(Denmark) (25) Peter Kildemand	68	15	6	7	6	4	9	3	6	6	2	4
13	(Denmark) (3) Nicki Pedersen	62	10	4	10	8	5	6	12	7	–	–	–
14	(Sweden) (100) Andreas Jonsson	53	6	8	8	6	9	2	0	–	–	7	7
15	(United Kingdom) (37) Chris Harris	40	3	3	4	10	1	2	4	6	0	3	4
16	(Denmark) (52) Michael Jepsen Jensen	31	–	–	–	–	–	–	–	7	4	10	10
17	(Poland) (16) Patryk Dudek	8	–	8	–	–	–	–	–	–	–	–	–
17	(Germany) (16) Martin Smolinski	8	–	–	–	–	–	–	–	8	–	–	–
17	(Poland) (16) Paweł Przedpełski	8	–	–	–	–	–	–	–	–	–	8	–
20	(United Kingdom) (16) Danny King	7	–	–	–	–	7	–	–	–	–	–	–
20	(Poland) (16) Krzysztof Kasprzak	7	–	–	–	–	–	–	7	–	–	–	–
22	(Denmark) (16) Anders Thomsen	5	–	–	5	–	–	–	–	–	–	–	–
22	(Sweden) (17) Kim Nilsson	5	–	–	–	–	–	–	–	–	5	–	–
24	(Sweden) (16) Peter Ljung	4	–	–	–	–	–	4	–	–	–	–	–
25	(Czech Republic) (16) Václav Milík Jr.	3	–	–	–	3	–	–	–	–	–	–	–
26	(Germany) (17) Tobias Kroner	2	–	–	–	–	–	–	–	2	–	–	–
26	(Australia) (16) Sam Masters	2	–	–	–	–	–	–	–	–	–	–	2
26	(Australia) (17) Brady Kurtz	2	–	–	–	–	–	–	–	–	–	–	2
26	(Australia) (19) Jack Holder	2	–	–	–	–	–	–	–	–	–	–	2
30	(Slovenia) (16) Denis Štojs	1	1	–	–	–	–	–	–	–	–	–	–
30	(Slovenia) (17) Nick Škorja	1	1	–	–	–	–	–	–	–	–	–	–
30	(Poland) (17) Daniel Kaczmarek	1	–	–	–	–	–	–	1	–	–	–	–
30	(Sweden) (16) Jacob Thorssell	1	–	–	–	–	–	–	–	–	1	–	–
30	(Poland) (17) Kacper Woryna	1	–	–	–	–	–	–	–	–	–	1	–
35	(Slovenia) (18) Matic Ivačič	0	0	–	–	–	–	–	–	–	–	–	–
35	(Poland) (18) Oskar Bober	0	–	–	–	–	–	–	–	–	–	0	–
35	(Australia) (18) Max Fricke	0	–	–	–	–	–	–	–	–	–	–	0
Pos.	Rider	Points	SVN (Slovenia)	POL (Poland)	DEN (Denmark)	CZE (Czech Republic)	GBR (United Kingdom)	SWE (Sweden)	PL2 (Poland)	GER (Germany)	SCA (Sweden)	PL3 (Poland)	AUS (Australia)

== See also ==
- motorcycle speedway
