= 2016 Speedway Grand Prix of Poland =

Motorcycle race

- 2016 Lotto Warsaw FIM Speedway Grand Prix of Poland

Information
- Date: 14 May 2016
- City: (Poland) Warsaw
- Event: 2 of 11
- Referee: (Sweden) Krister Gardell

Stadium details
- Stadium: Stadion Narodowy
- Capacity: 54,000
- Length: 272 m (297 yd)

SGP Results
- Best Time: (in Heat 4)
- (gold) Winner: (United Kingdom) Tai Woffinden
- (silver) Runner-up: (United States) Greg Hancock
- (bronze) 3rd place: (Slovenia) Matej Zagar

The 2016 Lotto Warsaw FIM Speedway Grand Prix of Poland was the second race of the 2016 Speedway Grand Prix season. It took place on May 14 at the Stadion Narodowy in Warsaw, Poland.

== Riders ==
For the second successive Grand Prix first reserve Fredrik Lindgren replaced Jarosław Hampel, who had injured himself during the 2015 Speedway World Cup and was not fit to compete. The Speedway Grand Prix Commission also nominated Patryk Dudek as the wild card, and Maksym Drabik and Paweł Przedpełski both as Track Reserves.

== Results ==
The Grand Prix was won by world champion Tai Woffinden, who beat Greg Hancock, Matej Žagar and Chris Holder in the final. Fredrik Lindgren had top stored during the 20 qualifying heats, but was eliminated in the semi-finals. Holder's fourth place in the final resulted in him taking the overall series lead from Peter Kildemand, who failed to make the semi-finals, with 26 points. Woffinden and Hancock finished just two points behind on 24.

=== Heat details ===
Placing	Draw	Rider	Total	1	2	3	4	5	6	7	8	9	10	11	12	13	14	15	16	17	18	19	20	Pts	Pos	21	22	23
Gold	5	(United Kingdom) (108) Tai Woffinden	14		3			3					1					0					2	9	5		2	3
Silver	10	(United States) (45) Greg Hancock	14			3			1						0			3		2				9	6	3		2
Bronze	16	(Slovenia) (55) Matej Žagar	14				3				3	3						1			0			10	2		3	1
4	7	(Australia) (23) Chris Holder	12		1					3					3	1					2			10	4	2		0
5	4	(Sweden) (66) Fredrik Lindgren	12	3							1				2				3				3	12	1	0
6	15	(Poland) (71) Maciej Janowski	10				1			3			2						3	0				9	7	1
7	8	(Sweden) (85) Antonio Lindbäck	10		2						0			3			3			1				9	8		1
8	14	(Poland) (95) Bartosz Zmarzlik	10				2		2					3		0							3	10	3		0
9	9	(Poland) (16) Patryk Dudek	8			1		2						0					2		3			8	9
10	3	(Sweden) (100) Andreas Jonsson	8	2						1				1				2				2		8	10
11	2	(Denmark) (25) Peter Kildemand	6	1					0				2				2				1			6	11
12	13	(Australia) (69) Jason Doyle	5				0	1							1		0					3		5	12
13	1	(Denmark) (88) Niels Kristian Iversen	4	0				0				2				2				0				4	13
14	12	(Denmark) (3) Nicki Pedersen	4			2					2		0			0						0		4	14
15	6	(Poland) (777) Piotr Pawlicki Jr.	4		0				2			0							1			1		4	15
16	11	(United Kingdom) (37) Chris Harris	3			0				0		1					1						1	3	16
Placing	Draw	Rider	Total	1	2	3	4	5	6	7	8	9	10	11	12	13	14	15	16	17	18	19	20	Pts	Pos	21	22	23

e: retired or mechanical failure • m: exclusion for exceeding two minute time allowance • t: exclusion for touching the tapes • x: other exclusion • f: fell
ns: non-starter • nc: non-classify
Semi-finals: Heat 21: Riders placed 1st, 4th, 6th & 7th in the intermediate classification (after 20 heats)
Heat 22: Riders placed 2nd, 3rd, 5th & 8th in the intermediate classification (after 20 heats)
Big Final (heat 23): The first and second placed riders in each of the Semi-Finals

gate A – inside	gate B	gate C	gate D – outside

== The intermediate classification ==
Qualifies for next season's Grand Prix series
Full-time Grand Prix rider
Wild card, track reserve or qualified reserve

Pos.	Rider	Points	SVN (Slovenia)	POL (Poland)	DEN (Denmark)	CZE (Czech Republic)	GBR (United Kingdom)	SWE (Sweden)	PL2 (Poland)	GER (Germany)	SCA (Sweden)	PL3 (Poland)	AUS (Australia)
Gold	(Australia) (23) Chris Holder	26	14	12									
Silver	(United Kingdom) (108) Tai Woffinden	24	10	14									
Bronze	(United States) (45) Greg Hancock	24	10	14									
4	(Denmark) (25) Peter Kildemand	21	15	6									
5	(Poland) (71) Maciej Janowski	20	10	10									
6	(Sweden) (85) Antonio Lindbäck	20	10	10									
7	(Sweden) (66) Fredrik Lindgren	19	7	12									
8	(Slovenia) (55) Matej Žagar	18	4	14									
9	(Australia) (69) Jason Doyle	18	13	5									
10	(Poland) (95) Bartosz Zmarzlik	18	8	10									
11	(Denmark) (3) Nicki Pedersen	14	10	4									
12	(Sweden) (100) Andreas Jonsson	14	6	8									
13	(Denmark) (88) Niels Kristian Iversen	12	8	4									
14	(Poland) (777) Piotr Pawlicki Jr.	12	8	4									
15	(Poland) (16) Patryk Dudek	8	–	8									
16	(United Kingdom) (37) Chris Harris	6	3	3									
17	(Slovenia) (16) Denis Štojs	1	1	–									
18	(Slovenia) (17) Nick Škorja	1	1	–									
19	(Slovenia) (18) Matic Ivačič	0	0	–									
Pos.	Rider	Points	SVN (Slovenia)	POL (Poland)	DEN (Denmark)	CZE (Czech Republic)	GBR (United Kingdom)	SWE (Sweden)	PL2 (Poland)	GER (Germany)	SCA (Sweden)	PL3 (Poland)	AUS (Australia)

== See also ==
- motorcycle speedway
