= 2016 Speedway Grand Prix of Great Britain =

Motorcycle race

(United Kingdom) 2016 Speedway Grand Prix of Great Britain
- 2016 Adrian Flux British FIM Speedway Grand Prix

Information
- Date: 9 July 2016
- City: (United Kingdom) Cardiff
- Event: 5 of 11
- Referee: (Denmark) Jesper Steentoft

Stadium details
- Stadium: Principality Stadium
- Capacity: 62,500
- Length: 272 m (297 yd)

SGP Results
- Best Time: (in Heat 4)
- (gold) Winner: (Sweden) Antonio Lindbäck
- (silver) Runner-up: (United Kingdom) Tai Woffinden
- (bronze) 3rd place: (Poland) Bartosz Zmarzlik

The 2016 Adrian Flux British FIM Speedway Grand Prix was the fifth race of the 2016 Speedway Grand Prix season. It took place on 9 July at the Principality Stadium in Cardiff, Wales.

== Riders ==
For the fifth successive Grand Prix first reserve Fredrik Lindgren replaced Jarosław Hampel, who had injured himself during the 2015 Speedway World Cup and was not fit to compete. The Speedway Grand Prix Commission also nominated Danny King as the wild card, and Robert Lambert and Steve Worrall both as Track Reserves.

== Results ==
The Grand Prix was won by Antonio Lindbäck, who beat world champion Tai Woffinden, Bartosz Zmarzlik and Greg Hancock in the final. Piotr Pawlicki Jr. had initially top scored during the 20 qualifying heats, but was eliminated in the semi-finals. By finishing second, and scoring 15 points, Woffinden closed the gap on Hancock at the top of the world championship standings to just three points.

=== Heat details ===
| Placing | Draw | Rider | Total | 1 | 2 | 3 | 4 | 5 | 6 | 7 | 8 | 9 | 10 | 11 | 12 | 13 | 14 | 15 | 16 | 17 | 18 | 19 | 20 | Pts | Pos | 21 | 22 | 23 |
|---|---|---|---|---|---|---|---|---|---|---|---|---|---|---|---|---|---|---|---|---|---|---|---|---|---|---|---|---|
| Gold | 1 | (Sweden) (85) Antonio Lindbäck | 18 | 3 | | | | 3 | | | | 3 | | | | 2 | | | | 1 | | | | 12 | 3 | | 3 | 3 |
| Silver | 9 | (United Kingdom) (108) Tai Woffinden | 15 | | | 1 | | 2 | | | | | | 2 | | | | | 2 | | 3 | | | 10 | 6 | 3 | | 2 |
| Bronze | 3 | (Poland) (95) Bartosz Zmarzlik | 13 | 1 | | | | | | 3 | | | | 1 | | | | 3 | | | | 2 | | 10 | 5 | | 2 | 1 |
| 4 | 6 | (United States) (45) Greg Hancock | 10 | | 0 | | | | 3 | | | 2 | | | | | | | 3 | | | 0 | | 8 | 7 | 2 | | 0 |
| 5 | 8 | (Poland) (777) Piotr Pawlicki Jr. | 14 | | 1 | | | | | | 3 | | | 3 | | | 3 | | | 3 | | | | 13 | 1 | 1 |
| 6 | 7 | (Australia) (69) Jason Doyle | 12 | | 3 | | | | | 1 | | | | | 3 | 3 | | | | | 2 | | | 12 | 2 | | 0 |
| 7 | 5 | (Poland) (71) Maciej Janowski | 11 | | 2 | | | 1 | | | | | 3 | | | | | 2 | | | | | 3 | 11 | 4 | 0 |
| 8 | 15 | (Sweden) (100) Andreas Jonsson | 9 | | | | 3 | | | 0 | | | 2 | | | | | | 1 | 2 | | | | 8 | 8 | | 1 |
| 9 | 12 | (Slovenia) (55) Matej Žagar | 8 | | | 3 | | | | | 2 | | 1 | | | 1 | | | | | | 1 | | 8 | 9 |
| 10 | 13 | (United Kingdom) (16) Danny King | 7 | | | | 0 | 0 | | | | | | | 2 | | 2 | | | | | 3 | | 7 | 10 |
| 11 | 11 | (Australia) (23) Chris Holder | 6 | | | 2 | | | | 2 | | 1 | | | | | 0 | | | | | | 1 | 6 | 11 |
| 12 | 14 | (Denmark) (3) Nicki Pedersen | 5 | | | | 1 | | 2 | | | | | 0 | | 0 | | | | | | | 2 | 5 | 12 |
| 13 | 2 | (Denmark) (25) Peter Kildemand | 4 | 2 | | | | | 0 | | | | 0 | | | | 1 | | | | 1 | | | 4 | 13 |
| 14 | 16 | (Denmark) (88) Niels Kristian Iversen | 3 | | | | 2 | | | | 0 | 0 | | | | | | 1 | | | 0 | | | 3 | 14 |
| 15 | 4 | (Sweden) (66) Fredrik Lindgren | 2 | 0 | | | | | | | 1 | | | | 1 | | | | 0 | | | | 0 | 2 | 15 |
| 16 | 10 | (United Kingdom) (37) Chris Harris | 1 | | | 0 | | | 1 | | | | | | 0 | | | 0 | | 0 | | | | 1 | 16 |
| Placing | Draw | Rider | Total | 1 | 2 | 3 | 4 | 5 | 6 | 7 | 8 | 9 | 10 | 11 | 12 | 13 | 14 | 15 | 16 | 17 | 18 | 19 | 20 | Pts | Pos | 21 | 22 | 23 |

e: retired or mechanical failure • m: exclusion for exceeding two minute time allowance • t: exclusion for touching the tapes • x: other exclusion • f: fell
ns: non-starter • nc: non-classify
Semi-finals: Heat 21: Riders placed 1st, 4th, 6th & 7th in the intermediate classification (after 20 heats)
Heat 22: Riders placed 2nd, 3rd, 5th & 8th in the intermediate classification (after 20 heats)
Big Final (heat 23): The first and second placed riders in each of the Semi-Finals

| gate A – inside | gate B | gate C | gate D – outside |

== The intermediate classification ==
Qualifies for next season's Grand Prix series
Full-time Grand Prix rider
Wild card, track reserve or qualified reserve

| Pos. | Rider | Points | SVN (Slovenia) | POL (Poland) | DEN (Denmark) | CZE (Czech Republic) | GBR (United Kingdom) | SWE (Sweden) | PL2 (Poland) | GER (Germany) | SCA (Sweden) | PL3 (Poland) | AUS (Australia) |
| Gold | (United States) (45) Greg Hancock | 66 | 10 | 14 | 14 | 18 | 10 | | | | | | |
| Silver | (United Kingdom) (108) Tai Woffinden | 63 | 10 | 14 | 15 | 9 | 15 | | | | | | |
| Bronze | (Australia) (69) Jason Doyle | 54 | 13 | 5 | 7 | 17 | 12 | | | | | | |
| 4 | (Sweden) (85) Antonio Lindbäck | 53 | 10 | 10 | 10 | 5 | 18 | | | | | | |
| 5 | (Poland) (71) Maciej Janowski | 52 | 10 | 10 | 16 | 5 | 11 | | | | | | |
| 6 | (Poland) (95) Bartosz Zmarzlik | 51 | 8 | 10 | 7 | 13 | 13 | | | | | | |
| 7 | (Australia) (23) Chris Holder | 50 | 14 | 12 | 13 | 5 | 6 | | | | | | |
| 8 | (Slovenia) (55) Matej Žagar | 39 | 4 | 14 | 8 | 5 | 8 | | | | | | |
| 9 | (Denmark) (25) Peter Kildemand | 38 | 15 | 6 | 7 | 6 | 4 | | | | | | |
| 10 | (Poland) (777) Piotr Pawlicki Jr. | 37 | 8 | 4 | 5 | 6 | 14 | | | | | | |
| 11 | (Denmark) (3) Nicki Pedersen | 37 | 10 | 4 | 10 | 8 | 5 | | | | | | |
| 12 | (Sweden) (100) Andreas Jonsson | 37 | 6 | 8 | 8 | 6 | 9 | | | | | | |
| 13 | (Sweden) (66) Fredrik Lindgren | 34 | 7 | 12 | 2 | 11 | 2 | | | | | | |
| 14 | (Denmark) (88) Niels Kristian Iversen | 33 | 8 | 4 | 7 | 11 | 3 | | | | | | |
| 15 | (United Kingdom) (37) Chris Harris | 21 | 3 | 3 | 4 | 10 | 1 | | | | | | |
| 16 | (Poland) (16) Patryk Dudek | 8 | – | 8 | – | – | – | | | | | | |
| 17 | (United Kingdom) (16) Danny King | 7 | – | – | – | – | 7 | | | | | | |
| 18 | (Denmark) (16) Anders Thomsen | 5 | – | – | 5 | – | – | | | | | | |
| 19 | (Czech Republic) (16) Václav Milík Jr. | 3 | – | – | – | 3 | – | | | | | | |
| 20 | (Slovenia) (18) Denis Štojs | 1 | 1 | – | – | – | – | | | | | | |
| 21 | (Slovenia) (19) Nick Škorja | 1 | 1 | – | – | – | – | | | | | | |
| 22 | (Slovenia) (20) Matic Ivačič | 0 | 0 | – | – | – | – | | | | | | |
| Pos. | Rider | Points | SVN (Slovenia) | POL (Poland) | DEN (Denmark) | CZE (Czech Republic) | GBR (United Kingdom) | SWE (Sweden) | PL2 (Poland) | GER (Germany) | SCA (Sweden) | PL3 (Poland) | AUS (Australia) |

== See also ==
- motorcycle speedway
