= 2016 Speedway Grand Prix of Denmark =

Motorcycle race

- 2016 Kjærgaard Danish FIM Speedway Grand Prix

Information
- Date: 11 June 2016
- City: (Denmark) Horsens
- Event: 3 of 11
- Referee: (Denmark) Jesper Steentoft

Stadium details
- Stadium: CASA Arena
- Capacity: 12,500
- Length: 272 m (297 yd)

SGP Results
- Best Time: (in Heat 4)
- (gold) Winner: (Poland) Maciej Janowski
- (silver) Runner-up: (Australia) Chris Holder
- (bronze) 3rd place: (United Kingdom) Tai Woffinden

The 2016 Kjærgaard Danish FIM Speedway Grand Prix was the third race of the 2016 Speedway Grand Prix season. It took place on 11 June at the CASA Arena in Horsens, Denmark.

== Riders ==
For the third successive Grand Prix first reserve Fredrik Lindgren replaced Jarosław Hampel, who had injured himself during the 2015 Speedway World Cup and was not fit to compete. The Speedway Grand Prix Commission also nominated Anders Thomsen as the wild card, and Mikkel Bech and Mikkel Michelsen both as Track Reserves.

== Results ==
The Grand Prix was won by Maciej Janowski, who beat Chris Holder, Tai Woffinden and Nicki Pedersen in the final. Greg Hancock had top stored during the 20 qualifying heats, but was eliminated in the semi-finals after making a mistake. Despite finishing third, Woffinden joined Holder at the top of the standings on 39 points after outscoring his rival on the evening.

=== Heat details ===
| Placing | Draw | Rider | Total | 1 | 2 | 3 | 4 | 5 | 6 | 7 | 8 | 9 | 10 | 11 | 12 | 13 | 14 | 15 | 16 | 17 | 18 | 19 | 20 | Pts | Pos | 21 | 22 | 23 |
|---|---|---|---|---|---|---|---|---|---|---|---|---|---|---|---|---|---|---|---|---|---|---|---|---|---|---|---|---|
| Gold | 14 | (Poland) (71) Maciej Janowski | 16 | | | | 2 | | 3 | | | | | 1 | | 3 | | | | | | | 1 | 10 | 3 | | 3 | 3 |
| Silver | 9 | (Australia) (23) Chris Holder | 13 | | | 1 | | 0 | | | | | | 3 | | | | | 1 | | 3 | | | 8 | 6 | 3 | | 2 |
| Bronze | 4 | (United Kingdom) (108) Tai Woffinden | 15 | 1 | | | | | | | 3 | | | | 3 | | | | 2 | | | | 3 | 12 | 2 | | 2 | 1 |
| 4 | 12 | (Denmark) (3) Nicki Pedersen | 10 | | | 2 | | | | | 1 | | 2 | | | 2 | | | | | | 1 | | 8 | 7 | 2 | | 0 |
| 5 | 6 | (United States) (45) Greg Hancock | 14 | | 3 | | | | 2 | | | 3 | | | | | | | 3 | | | 2 | | 13 | 1 | 1 |
| 6 | 1 | (Sweden) (85) Antonio Lindbäck | 10 | 3 | | | | 3 | | | | 2 | | | | 1 | | | | 1 | | | | 10 | 4 | 0 |
| 7 | 3 | (Sweden) (100) Andreas Jonsson | 8 | 0 | | | | | | 2 | | | | 2 | | | | 3 | | | | 0 | | 7 | 8 | | 1 |
| 8 | 11 | (Slovenia) (55) Matej Žagar | 8 | | | 3 | | | | 3 | | 0 | | | | | 0 | | | | | | 2 | 8 | 5 | | 0 |
| 9 | 15 | (Australia) (69) Jason Doyle | 7 | | | | 3 | | | 1 | | | 1 | | | | | | 0 | 2 | | | | 7 | 9 |
| 10 | 5 | (Poland) (95) Bartosz Zmarzlik | 7 | | 2 | | | 1 | | | | | 3 | | | | | 1 | | | | | 0 | 7 | 10 |
| 11 | 16 | (Denmark) (25) Peter Kildemand | 7 | | | | 0 | | | | 2 | 1 | | | | | | 1 | | | 3 | | | 7 | 11 |
| 12 | 2 | (Denmark) (88) Niels Kristian Iversen | 7 | 2 | | | | | 1 | | | | 0 | | | | 3 | | | | 1 | | | 7 | 12 |
| 13 | 10 | (Poland) (777) Piotr Pawlicki Jr. | 5 | | | 0 | | | 0 | | | | | | 0 | | | 2 | | 3 | | | | 5 | 13 |
| 14 | 8 | (Denmark) (16) Anders Thomsen | 5 | | 1 | | | | | | 2 | | | 0 | | | 2 | | | 0 | | | | 5 | 14 |
| 15 | 7 | (United Kingdom) (37) Chris Harris | 4 | | 0 | | | | | 0 | | | | | 2 | 0 | | | | | 2 | | | 4 | 15 |
| 16 | 11 | (Sweden) (66) Fredrik Lindgren | 2 | | | 1 | | | | 0 | | 1 | | | | | 0 | | | | | | 0 | 2 | 16 |
| Placing | Draw | Rider | Total | 1 | 2 | 3 | 4 | 5 | 6 | 7 | 8 | 9 | 10 | 11 | 12 | 13 | 14 | 15 | 16 | 17 | 18 | 19 | 20 | Pts | Pos | 21 | 22 | 23 |

e: retired or mechanical failure • m: exclusion for exceeding two minute time allowance • t: exclusion for touching the tapes • x: other exclusion • f: fell
ns: non-starter • nc: non-classify
Semi-finals: Heat 21: Riders placed 1st, 4th, 6th & 7th in the intermediate classification (after 20 heats)
Heat 22: Riders placed 2nd, 3rd, 5th & 8th in the intermediate classification (after 20 heats)
Big Final (heat 23): The first and second placed riders in each of the Semi-Finals

| gate A – inside | gate B | gate C | gate D – outside |

== The intermediate classification ==
Qualifies for next season's Grand Prix series
Full-time Grand Prix rider
Wild card, track reserve or qualified reserve

| Pos. | Rider | Points | SVN (Slovenia) | POL (Poland) | DEN (Denmark) | CZE (Czech Republic) | GBR (United Kingdom) | SWE (Sweden) | PL2 (Poland) | GER (Germany) | SCA (Sweden) | PL3 (Poland) | AUS (Australia) |
| Gold | (United Kingdom) (108) Tai Woffinden | 39 | 10 | 14 | 15 | | | | | | | | |
| Silver | (Australia) (23) Chris Holder | 39 | 14 | 12 | 13 | | | | | | | | |
| Bronze | (United States) (45) Greg Hancock | 38 | 10 | 14 | 14 | | | | | | | | |
| 4 | (Poland) (71) Maciej Janowski | 36 | 10 | 10 | 16 | | | | | | | | |
| 5 | (Sweden) (85) Antonio Lindbäck | 30 | 10 | 10 | 10 | | | | | | | | |
| 6 | (Denmark) (25) Peter Kildemand | 28 | 15 | 6 | 7 | | | | | | | | |
| 7 | (Slovenia) (55) Matej Žagar | 26 | 4 | 14 | 8 | | | | | | | | |
| 8 | (Australia) (69) Jason Doyle | 25 | 13 | 5 | 7 | | | | | | | | |
| 9 | (Poland) (95) Bartosz Zmarzlik | 25 | 8 | 10 | 7 | | | | | | | | |
| 10 | (Denmark) (3) Nicki Pedersen | 24 | 10 | 4 | 10 | | | | | | | | |
| 11 | (Sweden) (100) Andreas Jonsson | 22 | 6 | 8 | 8 | | | | | | | | |
| 12 | (Sweden) (66) Fredrik Lindgren | 21 | 7 | 12 | 2 | | | | | | | | |
| 13 | (Denmark) (88) Niels Kristian Iversen | 19 | 8 | 4 | 7 | | | | | | | | |
| 14 | (Poland) (777) Piotr Pawlicki Jr. | 17 | 8 | 4 | 5 | | | | | | | | |
| 15 | (United Kingdom) (37) Chris Harris | 10 | 3 | 3 | 4 | | | | | | | | |
| 16 | (Poland) (16) Patryk Dudek | 8 | – | 8 | – | | | | | | | | |
| 17 | (Denmark) (16) Anders Thomsen | 5 | – | – | 5 | | | | | | | | |
| 18 | (Slovenia) (16) Denis Štojs | 1 | 1 | – | – | | | | | | | | |
| 19 | (Slovenia) (17) Nick Škorja | 1 | 1 | – | – | | | | | | | | |
| 20 | (Slovenia) (18) Matic Ivačič | 0 | 0 | – | – | | | | | | | | |
| Pos. | Rider | Points | SVN (Slovenia) | POL (Poland) | DEN (Denmark) | CZE (Czech Republic) | GBR (United Kingdom) | SWE (Sweden) | PL2 (Poland) | GER (Germany) | SCA (Sweden) | PL3 (Poland) | AUS (Australia) |

== See also ==
- motorcycle speedway
