= 2016 Speedway Grand Prix of Czech Republic =

Motorcycle race

- 2016 Mitas Czech Republic FIM Speedway Grand Prix

Information
- Date: 25 June 2016
- City: (Czech Republic) Prague
- Event: 4 of 11
- Referee: (United Kingdom) Jim Lawrence

Stadium details
- Stadium: Markéta Stadium
- Capacity: 10,000
- Length: 353 m (386 yd)

SGP Results
- Best Time: (in Heat 4)
- (gold) Winner: (Australia) Jason Doyle
- (silver) Runner-up: (United States) Greg Hancock
- (bronze) 3rd place: (United Kingdom) Chris Harris

The 2016 Mitas Czech Republic FIM Speedway Grand Prix was the fourth race of the 2016 Speedway Grand Prix season. It took place on June 25 at the Markéta Stadium in Prague, Czech Republic.

== Riders ==
For the fourth successive Grand Prix first reserve Fredrik Lindgren replaced Jarosław Hampel, who had injured himself during the 2015 Speedway World Cup and was not fit to compete. The Speedway Grand Prix Commission also nominated Václav Milík Jr. as the wild card, and Josef Franc and Eduard Krčmář both as Track Reserves.

== Results ==
The Grand Prix was won by Jason Doyle, who beat Greg Hancock, Chris Harris and Niels Kristian Iversen in the final. It was the first time the Australian had won a Grand Prix. Hancock top stored overall during the meeting and, with former joint-leaders Tai Woffinden and Chris Holder both failing to make the final, he took the lead in the Championship standings.

=== Heat details ===
Placing	Draw	Rider	Total	1	2	3	4	5	6	7	8	9	10	11	12	13	14	15	16	17	18	19	20	Pts	Pos	21	22	23
Gold	13	(Australia) (69) Jason Doyle	17				1	3							3		2					2		11	3		3	3
Silver	3	(United States) (45) Greg Hancock	18	3						1				3				3				3		13	1	3		2
Bronze	9	(United Kingdom) (37) Chris Harris	10			1		1						0					2		3			7	8		2	1
4	16	(Denmark) (88) Niels Kristian Iversen	11				3				3	1						1			1			9	6	2		0
5	7	(Poland) (95) Bartosz Zmarzlik	13		3					2					2	3					2			12	2		1
6	14	(Sweden) (66) Fredrik Lindgren	11				2		3					1		2							2	10	4	1
7	11	(United Kingdom) (108) Tai Woffinden	9			3				3		2					0						1	9	5		0
8	1	(Denmark) (3) Nicki Pedersen	8	2				2				0				1				3				8	7	0
9	12	(Sweden) (100) Andreas Jonsson	6			0					2		3			0						1		6	9
10	5	(Denmark) (25) Peter Kildemand	6		2			0					1					0					3	6	10
11	10	(Poland) (777) Piotr Pawlicki Jr.	6			2			1						0			2		1				6	11
12	15	(Poland) (71) Maciej Janowski	5				0			0			2						3	0				5	12
13	2	(Sweden) (85) Antonio Lindbäck	5	0					2				0				3				0			5	13
14	6	(Slovenia) (55) Matej Žagar	5		1				0			3							1			0		5	14
15	8	(Australia) (23) Chris Holder	5		0						0			2			1			2				5	15
16	4	(Czech Republic) (16) Václav Milík Jr.	3	1							1				1				0				0	3	16
Placing	Draw	Rider	Total	1	2	3	4	5	6	7	8	9	10	11	12	13	14	15	16	17	18	19	20	Pts	Pos	21	22	23

e: retired or mechanical failure • m: exclusion for exceeding two minute time allowance • t: exclusion for touching the tapes • x: other exclusion • f: fell
ns: non-starter • nc: non-classify
Semi-finals: Heat 21: Riders placed 1st, 4th, 6th & 7th in the intermediate classification (after 20 heats)
Heat 22: Riders placed 2nd, 3rd, 5th & 8th in the intermediate classification (after 20 heats)
Big Final (heat 23): The first and second placed riders in each of the Semi-Finals

gate A – inside	gate B	gate C	gate D – outside

== The intermediate classification ==
Qualifies for next season's Grand Prix series
Full-time Grand Prix rider
Wild card, track reserve or qualified reserve

Pos.	Rider	Points	SVN (Slovenia)	POL (Poland)	DEN (Denmark)	CZE (Czech Republic)	GBR (United Kingdom)	SWE (Sweden)	PL2 (Poland)	GER (Germany)	SCA (Sweden)	PL3 (Poland)	AUS (Australia)
Gold	(United States) (45) Greg Hancock	56	10	14	14	18							
Silver	(United Kingdom) (108) Tai Woffinden	48	10	14	15	9							
Bronze	(Australia) (23) Chris Holder	44	14	12	13	5							
4	(Australia) (69) Jason Doyle	42	13	5	7	17							
5	(Poland) (71) Maciej Janowski	41	10	10	16	5							
6	(Poland) (95) Bartosz Zmarzlik	38	8	10	7	13							
7	(Sweden) (85) Antonio Lindbäck	35	10	10	10	5							
8	(Denmark) (25) Peter Kildemand	34	15	6	7	6							
9	(Denmark) (3) Nicki Pedersen	32	10	4	10	8							
10	(Sweden) (66) Fredrik Lindgren	32	7	12	2	11							
11	(Slovenia) (55) Matej Žagar	31	4	14	8	5							
12	(Denmark) (88) Niels Kristian Iversen	30	8	4	7	11							
13	(Sweden) (100) Andreas Jonsson	28	6	8	8	6							
14	(Poland) (777) Piotr Pawlicki Jr.	23	8	4	5	6							
15	(United Kingdom) (37) Chris Harris	20	3	3	4	10							
16	(Poland) (16) Patryk Dudek	8	–	8	–	–							
17	(Denmark) (16) Anders Thomsen	5	–	–	5	–							
18	(Czech Republic) (16) Václav Milík Jr.	3	–	–	–	3							
19	(Slovenia) (18) Denis Štojs	1	1	–	–	–							
20	(Slovenia) (19) Nick Škorja	1	1	–	–	–							
21	(Slovenia) (20) Matic Ivačič	0	0	–	–	–							
Pos.	Rider	Points	SVN (Slovenia)	POL (Poland)	DEN (Denmark)	CZE (Czech Republic)	GBR (United Kingdom)	SWE (Sweden)	PL2 (Poland)	GER (Germany)	SCA (Sweden)	PL3 (Poland)	AUS (Australia)

== See also ==
- motorcycle speedway
