= 2016 Speedway Grand Prix of Sweden =

Motorcycle race

- 2016 Swedish FIM Speedway Grand Prix

Information
- Date: 14 August 2016
- City: (Sweden) Målilla
- Event: 6 of 11
- Referee: (Poland) Artur Kusmierz

Stadium details
- Stadium: G&B Arena
- Capacity: 15,000
- Length: 305 m (334 yd)

SGP Results
- Best Time: (in Heat 4)
- (gold) Winner: (United States) Greg Hancock
- (silver) Runner-up: (Australia) Jason Doyle
- (bronze) 3rd place: (Poland) Piotr Pawlicki Jr.

The 2016 Swedish FIM Speedway Grand Prix was the sixth race of the 2016 Speedway Grand Prix season. It took place on 14 August at the G&B Arena in Målilla, Sweden, after the initial scheduled staging on 13 August was cancelled due to the weather.

== Riders ==
For the sixth successive Grand Prix first reserve Fredrik Lindgren replaced Jarosław Hampel, who had injured himself during the 2015 Speedway World Cup and was not fit to compete. The Speedway Grand Prix Commission also nominated Peter Ljung as the wild card, and Jacob Thorssell and Kim Nilsson both as Track Reserves.

== Results ==
The Grand Prix was won by Greg Hancock, who beat Jason Doyle, Piotr Pawlicki Jr. and Chris Holder in the final. As a result, Hancock stretched his lead in the world championship standings to 12 points, with Doyle now sitting joint-second with defending world champion Tai Woffinden, who failed to make the semi-finals.

=== Heat details ===
Placing	Draw	Rider	Total	1	2	3	4	5	6	7	8	9	10	11	12	13	14	15	16	17	18	19	20	Pts	Pos	21	22	23
Gold	1	(United States) (45) Greg Hancock	17	3				2				1				2				3				11	3		3	3
Silver	13	(Australia) (69) Jason Doyle	17				2	3							3		3					1		12	1	3		2
Bronze	16	(Poland) (777) Piotr Pawlicki Jr.	13				1				3	0						3			3			10	4	2		1
4	8	(Australia) (23) Chris Holder	12		2						2			3			2			1				10	5		2	0
5	6	(Poland) (71) Maciej Janowski	12		3				3			3							2			0		11	2		1
6	14	(Poland) (95) Bartosz Zmarzlik	10				3		2					2		1							1	9	6	1
7	10	(Denmark) (25) Peter Kildemand	9			3			1						1			2		2				9	7	0
8	5	(Denmark) (88) Niels Kristian Iversen	8		0			1					3					1					3	8	8		0
9	12	(Sweden) (66) Fredrik Lindgren	8			2					1		2			0						3		8	9
10	11	(United Kingdom) (108) Tai Woffinden	8			0				3		2					1						2	8	10
11	9	(Sweden) (85) Antonio Lindbäck	7			1		0						1					3		2			7	11
12	7	(Denmark) (3) Nicki Pedersen	6		1					0					2	3					0			6	12
13	2	(Sweden) (16) Peter Ljung	4	2					0				1				0				1			4	13
14	3	(Slovenia) (55) Matej Žagar	3	0						1				0				0				2		3	14
15	15	(United Kingdom) (37) Chris Harris	2				0			2			0						0	0				2	15
16	4	(Sweden) (100) Andreas Jonsson	2	1							0				0				1				0	2	16
Placing	Draw	Rider	Total	1	2	3	4	5	6	7	8	9	10	11	12	13	14	15	16	17	18	19	20	Pts	Pos	21	22	23

e: retired or mechanical failure • m: exclusion for exceeding two minute time allowance • t: exclusion for touching the tapes • x: other exclusion • f: fell
ns: non-starter • nc: non-classify
Semi-finals: Heat 21: Riders placed 1st, 4th, 6th & 7th in the intermediate classification (after 20 heats)
Heat 22: Riders placed 2nd, 3rd, 5th & 8th in the intermediate classification (after 20 heats)
Big Final (heat 23): The first and second placed riders in each of the Semi-Finals

gate A – inside	gate B	gate C	gate D – outside

== The intermediate classification ==
Qualifies for next season's Grand Prix series
Full-time Grand Prix rider
Wild card, track reserve or qualified reserve

Pos.	Rider	Points	SVN (Slovenia)	POL (Poland)	DEN (Denmark)	CZE (Czech Republic)	GBR (United Kingdom)	SWE (Sweden)	PL2 (Poland)	GER (Germany)	SCA (Sweden)	PL3 (Poland)	AUS (Australia)
Gold	(United States) (45) Greg Hancock	83	10	14	14	18	10	17					
Silver	(Australia) (69) Jason Doyle	71	13	5	7	17	12	17					
Bronze	(United Kingdom) (108) Tai Woffinden	71	10	14	15	9	15	8					
4	(Poland) (71) Maciej Janowski	64	10	10	16	5	11	12					
5	(Australia) (23) Chris Holder	62	14	12	13	5	6	12					
6	(Poland) (95) Bartosz Zmarzlik	61	8	10	7	13	13	10					
7	(Sweden) (85) Antonio Lindbäck	60	10	10	10	5	18	7					
8	(Poland) (777) Piotr Pawlicki Jr.	50	8	4	5	6	14	13					
9	(Denmark) (25) Peter Kildemand	47	15	6	7	6	4	9					
10	(Denmark) (3) Nicki Pedersen	43	10	4	10	8	5	6					
11	(Slovenia) (55) Matej Žagar	42	4	14	8	5	8	3					
12	(Sweden) (66) Fredrik Lindgren	42	7	12	2	11	2	8					
13	(Denmark) (88) Niels Kristian Iversen	41	8	4	7	11	3	8					
14	(Sweden) (100) Andreas Jonsson	39	6	8	8	6	9	2					
15	(United Kingdom) (37) Chris Harris	23	3	3	4	10	1	2					
16	(Poland) (16) Patryk Dudek	8	–	8	–	–	–	–					
17	(United Kingdom) (16) Danny King	7	–	–	–	–	7	–					
18	(Denmark) (16) Anders Thomsen	5	–	–	5	–	–	–					
19	(Sweden) (16) Peter Ljung	4	–	–	–	–	–	4					
20	(Czech Republic) (16) Václav Milík Jr.	3	–	–	–	3	–	–					
21	(Slovenia) (18) Denis Štojs	1	1	–	–	–	–	–					
22	(Slovenia) (19) Nick Škorja	1	1	–	–	–	–	–					
23	(Slovenia) (20) Matic Ivačič	0	0	–	–	–	–	–					
Pos.	Rider	Points	SVN (Slovenia)	POL (Poland)	DEN (Denmark)	CZE (Czech Republic)	GBR (United Kingdom)	SWE (Sweden)	PL2 (Poland)	GER (Germany)	SCA (Sweden)	PL3 (Poland)	AUS (Australia)

== See also ==
- Motorcycle speedway
