= 2016 Speedway Grand Prix of Poland II =

Motorcycle race

- 2016 MIB Nordic Gorzow FIM Speedway Grand Prix of Poland

Information
- Date: 27 August 2016
- City: (Poland) Gorzów Wielkopolski
- Event: 7 of 11
- Referee: (United Kingdom) Jim Lawrence

Stadium details
- Stadium: Edward Jancarz Stadium
- Capacity: 17,000
- Length: 329 m (360 yd)

SGP Results
- Best Time: (in Heat 4)
- (gold) Winner: (Australia) Jason Doyle
- (silver) Runner-up: (United Kingdom) Tai Woffinden
- (bronze) 3rd place: (Australia) Chris Holder

The 2016 MIB Nordic Gorzow FIM Speedway Grand Prix of Poland was the seventh race of the 2016 Speedway Grand Prix season. It took place on 27 August at the Edward Jancarz Stadium in Gorzów Wielkopolski, Poland.

== Riders ==
The Speedway Grand Prix Commission nominated Krzysztof Kasprzak as the wild card, and Daniel Kaczmarek and Paweł Przedpełski both as Track Reserves.

== Results ==
The Grand Prix was won by Jason Doyle, who beat world champion Tai Woffinden, Chris Holder and Bartosz Zmarzlik in the final. As a result, Doyle closed the lead on Hancock in the world championship standings to seven points, with Woffinden now sitting one point further back in third.

=== Heat details ===
Placing	Draw	Rider	Total	1	2	3	4	5	6	7	8	9	10	11	12	13	14	15	16	17	18	19	20	Pts	Pos	21	22	23
Gold	4	(Australia) (69) Jason Doyle	16	3							2				3				1				2	11	4	2		3
Silver	12	(United Kingdom) (108) Tai Woffinden	15			3					1		1			3						2		10	7	3		2
Bronze	6	(Australia) (23) Chris Holder	15		1				3			2							3			3		12	2		2	1
4	8	(Poland) (95) Bartosz Zmarzlik	14		3						3			2			0			3				11	3		3	0
5	5	(Denmark) (3) Nicki Pedersen	12		2			3					3					3					1	12	1	0
6	14	(United States) (45) Greg Hancock	11				3		1					1		2							3	10	6	1
7	2	(Sweden) (66) Fredrik Lindgren	11	2					2				2				2				2			10	8		1
8	11	(Poland) (777) Piotr Pawlicki Jr.	10			1				3		3					3						0	10	5		0
9	9	(Poland) (16) Krzysztof Kasprzak	7			0		2						3					2		x			7	9
10	7	(Poland) (71) Maciej Janowski	6		0					1					1	1					3			6	10
11	13	(Denmark) (88) Niels Kristian Iversen	5				0	1							2		1					1		5	11
12	15	(Sweden) (85) Antonio Lindbäck	4				2			2			0						0	0				4	12
13	1	(Slovenia) (55) Matej Žagar	4	1				0				1				0				2				4	13
14	10	(United Kingdom) (37) Chris Harris	4			2			0						0			1		1				4	14
15	16	(Denmark) (25) Peter Kildemand	3				1				0	0						2			t			3	15
16	3	(Sweden) (100) Andreas Jonsson	0	0						0				0				0				0		0	16
17	17	(Poland) (17) Daniel Kaczmarek	1																					1	17
Placing	Draw	Rider	Total	1	2	3	4	5	6	7	8	9	10	11	12	13	14	15	16	17	18	19	20	Pts	Pos	21	22	23

e: retired or mechanical failure • m: exclusion for exceeding two minute time allowance • t: exclusion for touching the tapes • x: other exclusion • f: fell
ns: non-starter • nc: non-classify
Semi-finals: Heat 21: Riders placed 1st, 4th, 6th & 7th in the intermediate classification (after 20 heats)
Heat 22: Riders placed 2nd, 3rd, 5th & 8th in the intermediate classification (after 20 heats)
Big Final (heat 23): The first and second placed riders in each of the Semi-Finals

gate A – inside	gate B	gate C	gate D – outside

== The intermediate classification ==
Qualifies for next season's Grand Prix series
Full-time Grand Prix rider
Wild card, track reserve or qualified reserve

Pos.	Rider	Points	SVN (Slovenia)	POL (Poland)	DEN (Denmark)	CZE (Czech Republic)	GBR (United Kingdom)	SWE (Sweden)	PL2 (Poland)	GER (Germany)	SCA (Sweden)	PL3 (Poland)	AUS (Australia)
Gold	(United States) (45) Greg Hancock	94	10	14	14	18	10	17	11				
Silver	(Australia) (69) Jason Doyle	87	13	5	7	17	12	17	16				
Bronze	(United Kingdom) (108) Tai Woffinden	86	10	14	15	9	15	8	15				
4	(Australia) (23) Chris Holder	77	14	12	13	5	6	12	15				
5	(Poland) (95) Bartosz Zmarzlik	75	8	10	7	13	13	10	14				
6	(Poland) (71) Maciej Janowski	70	10	10	16	5	11	12	6				
7	(Sweden) (85) Antonio Lindbäck	64	10	10	10	5	18	7	4				
8	(Poland) (777) Piotr Pawlicki Jr.	60	8	4	5	6	14	13	10				
9	(Denmark) (3) Nicki Pedersen	55	10	4	10	8	5	6	12				
10	(Sweden) (66) Fredrik Lindgren	53	7	12	2	11	2	8	11				
11	(Denmark) (25) Peter Kildemand	50	15	6	7	6	4	9	3				
12	(Slovenia) (55) Matej Žagar	46	4	14	8	5	8	3	4				
13	(Denmark) (88) Niels Kristian Iversen	46	8	4	7	11	3	8	5				
14	(Sweden) (100) Andreas Jonsson	39	6	8	8	6	9	2	0				
15	(United Kingdom) (37) Chris Harris	27	3	3	4	10	1	2	4				
16	(Poland) (16) Patryk Dudek	8	–	8	–	–	–	–	–				
17	(United Kingdom) (16) Danny King	7	–	–	–	–	7	–	–				
18	(Poland) (16) Krzysztof Kasprzak	7	–	–	–	–	–	–	7				
19	(Denmark) (16) Anders Thomsen	5	–	–	5	–	–	–	–				
20	(Sweden) (16) Peter Ljung	4	–	–	–	–	–	4	–				
21	(Czech Republic) (16) Václav Milík Jr.	3	–	–	–	3	–	–	–				
22	(Slovenia) (16) Denis Štojs	1	1	–	–	–	–	–	–				
23	(Slovenia) (17) Nick Škorja	1	1	–	–	–	–	–	–				
24	(Poland) (17) Daniel Kaczmarek	1	–	–	–	–	–	–	1				
25	(Slovenia) (18) Matic Ivačič	0	0	–	–	–	–	–	–				
Pos.	Rider	Points	SVN (Slovenia)	POL (Poland)	DEN (Denmark)	CZE (Czech Republic)	GBR (United Kingdom)	SWE (Sweden)	PL2 (Poland)	GER (Germany)	SCA (Sweden)	PL3 (Poland)	AUS (Australia)

== See also ==
- motorcycle speedway
