= 2016 Speedway Grand Prix of Slovenia =

Motorcycle race

- 2016 Slovenian FIM Speedway Grand Prix

Information
- Date: 30 April 2016
- City: (Slovenia) Krško
- Event: 1 of 11
- Referee: (Poland) Arthur Kusmierz

Stadium details
- Stadium: Matija Gubec Stadium
- Capacity: 12,000
- Length: 387.7 m (424.0 yd)

SGP Results
- Best Time: (in Heat 4)
- (gold) Winner: (Denmark) Peter Kildemand
- (silver) Runner-up: (Australia) Jason Doyle
- (bronze) 3rd place: (Australia) Chris Holder

The 2016 Slovenian FIM Speedway Grand Prix was the opening race of the 2016 Speedway Grand Prix season. It took place on 30 April at the Matija Gubec Stadium in Krško, Slovenia.

== Riders ==
First reserve Fredrik Lindgren replaced Jarosław Hampel, who had injured himself during the 2015 Speedway World Cup and was not fit for the start of the 2016 season. The Speedway Grand Prix Commission also nominated Denis Štojs as the wild card, and Nick Škorja and Matic Ivačič both as Track Reserves.

== Results ==
The Grand Prix was won by Peter Kildemand, who beat Jason Doyle, Chris Holder and defending world champion Tai Woffinden in the final. Kildemand therefore took an early lead in the world championship standings. Despite finishing third in the final, Holder was second in the standings after outscoring Doyle on the night.

=== Heat details ===
Placing	Draw	Rider	Total	1	2	3	4	5	6	7	8	9	10	11	12	13	14	15	16	17	18	19	20	Pts	Pos	21	22	23
Gold	11	(Denmark) (25) Peter Kildemand	15			1				3		3					1						1	9	6	3		3
Silver	2	(Australia) (69) Jason Doyle	13	1					0				3				3				2			9	4	2		2
Bronze	14	(Australia) (23) Chris Holder	14				3		2					0		3							2	10	2		3	1
4	8	(United Kingdom) (108) Tai Woffinden	10		2						1			3			2			0				8	8		2	0
5	13	(United States) (45) Greg Hancock	10				1	3							3		0					2		9	5		1
6	10	(Denmark) (3) Nicki Pedersen	10			2			3						2			1		1				9	7	1
7	5	(Poland) (71) Maciej Janowski	10		3			0					1					3					3	10	1	0
8	15	(Sweden) (85) Antonio Lindbäck	10				2			2			0						3	3				10	3		0
9	12	(Poland) (95) Bartosz Zmarzlik	8			3					0		2			2						1		8	9
10	1	(Poland) (777) Piotr Pawlicki Jr.	8	3				2				t				1				2				8	10
11	9	(Denmark) (88) Niels Kristian Iversen	8			0		1						2					2		3			8	11
12	16	(Sweden) (66) Fredrik Lindgren	7				0				2	2						2			1			7	12
13	6	(Sweden) (100) Andreas Jonsson	6		1				1			1							0			3		6	13
14	4	(Slovenia) (55) Matej Žagar	4	0							3				0				1				0	4	14
15	3	(United Kingdom) (37) Chris Harris	3	2						t				1				0				0		3	15
16	7	(Slovenia) (16) Denis Štojs	1		0					0					1	0					0			1	16
17	17	(Slovenia) (17) Nick Škorja	1																					1	17
18	18	(Slovenia) (18) Matic Ivačič	0																					0	18
Placing	Draw	Rider	Total	1	2	3	4	5	6	7	8	9	10	11	12	13	14	15	16	17	18	19	20	Pts	Pos	21	22	23

e: retired or mechanical failure • m: exclusion for exceeding two minute time allowance • t: exclusion for touching the tapes • x: other exclusion • f: fell
ns: non-starter • nc: non-classify
Semi-finals: Heat 21: Riders placed 1st, 4th, 6th & 7th in the intermediate classification (after 20 heats)
Heat 22: Riders placed 2nd, 3rd, 5th & 8th in the intermediate classification (after 20 heats)
Big Final (heat 23): The first and second placed riders in each of the Semi-Finals

gate A – inside	gate B	gate C	gate D – outside

== The intermediate classification ==
Qualifies for next season's Grand Prix series
Full-time Grand Prix rider
Wild card, track reserve or qualified reserve

Pos.	Rider	Points	SVN (Slovenia)	POL (Poland)	DEN (Denmark)	CZE (Czech Republic)	GBR (United Kingdom)	SWE (Sweden)	PL2 (Poland)	GER (Germany)	SCA (Sweden)	PL3 (Poland)	AUS (Australia)
Gold	(Denmark) (25) Peter Kildemand	15	15										
Silver	(Australia) (23) Chris Holder	14	14										
Bronze	(Australia) (69) Jason Doyle	13	13										
4	(United Kingdom) (108) Tai Woffinden	10	10										
5	(United States) (45) Greg Hancock	10	10										
6	(Denmark) (3) Nicki Pedersen	10	10										
7	(Poland) (71) Maciej Janowski	10	10										
8	(Sweden) (85) Antonio Lindbäck	10	10										
9	(Denmark) (88) Niels Kristian Iversen	8	8										
10	(Poland) (95) Bartosz Zmarzlik	8	8										
11	(Poland) (777) Piotr Pawlicki Jr.	8	8										
12	(Sweden) (66) Fredrik Lindgren	7	7										
13	(Sweden) (100) Andreas Jonsson	6	6										
14	(Slovenia) (55) Matej Žagar	4	4										
15	(United Kingdom) (37) Chris Harris	3	3										
16	(Slovenia) (16) Denis Štojs	1	1										
17	(Slovenia) (17) Nick Škorja	1	1										
18	(Slovenia) (18) Matic Ivačič	0	0										
Pos.	Rider	Points	SVN (Slovenia)	POL (Poland)	DEN (Denmark)	CZE (Czech Republic)	GBR (United Kingdom)	SWE (Sweden)	PL2 (Poland)	GER (Germany)	SCA (Sweden)	PL3 (Poland)	AUS (Australia)

== See also ==
- motorcycle speedway
