= 2016 Speedway Grand Prix =

22nd season of the Speedway Grand Prix

Season details
- Dates: April 30 — October 22
- Events: 11
- Riders: 15 permanents 1 wild card(s); 2 track reserves
- Heats: 253 (in 11 events)

Winners
- Champion: USA Greg Hancock
- Runner-up: GBR Tai Woffinden
- 3rd place: POL Bartosz Zmarzlik

The 2016 Speedway Grand Prix season was the 22nd season of the Speedway Grand Prix era, and decided the 71st FIM Speedway World Championship. It was the sixteenth series under the promotion of Benfield Sports International, an IMG company. Tai Woffinden was the defending champion from 2015.

Greg Hancock won the title, the fourth of his career. He won the series by nine points from 2015 champion Woffinden, who finished second ahead of debutant Bartosz Zmarzlik. Jason Doyle was leading the series with two rounds to go, but suffered an injury in his first heat during the penultimate round in Poland and was unable to complete the season. He eventually finished fifth, behind Australian compatriot and 2012 world champion Chris Holder, who won his home Grand Prix in Melbourne (his first SGP win since 2012) to move in fourth in the standings.

The title lifted Hancock to sixth on the all-time list, joining Ivan Mauger and Tony Rickardsson (6 each), Ove Fundin (5) and Barry Briggs and Hans Nielsen (4 each) as riders to win at least four individual world championships.

== Qualification ==
For the 2016 season there were 15 permanent riders, joined at each Grand Prix by one wild card and two track reserves.

The top eight riders from the 2015 championship qualified automatically. Those riders were joined by the three riders who qualified via the Grand Prix Challenge.

The final four riders were nominated by series promoters, Benfield Sports International, following the completion of the 2015 season.

=== Qualified riders ===
#	Riders	2015 place	GP Ch place	Appearance	Previous appearances in series
108	(United Kingdom) Tai Woffinden	1	—	5th	2010, 2011, 2013–2015
45	(United States) Greg Hancock	2	—	22nd	1995–2015
3	(Denmark) Nicki Pedersen	3	—	16th	2000, 2001–2015
88	(Denmark) Niels Kristian Iversen	4	—	6th	2004–2005, 2006, 2008, 2009–2010, 2013–2015
69	(Australia) Jason Doyle	5	—	2nd	2015
55	(Slovenia) Matej Žagar	6	—	6th	2003–2005, 2006–2007, 2008–2009, 2011, 2013–2015
71	(Poland) Maciej Janowski	7	—	2nd	2008, 2012, 2014, 2015
23	(Australia) Chris Holder	8	—	7th	2010–2015
95	(Poland) Bartosz Zmarzlik	18	1	1st	2012–2015
777	(Poland) Piotr Pawlicki Jr.	19	2	1st	2015
37	(United Kingdom) Chris Harris	13	3	10th	2003, 2007–2012, 2013, 2014–2015
25	(Denmark) Peter Kildemand	9	5	1st	2012–2015
100	(Sweden) Andreas Jonsson	10	—	15th	2001, 2002–2015
33	(Poland) Jarosław Hampel	16	—	11th	2000–2002, 2004–2007, 2008–2009, 2010–2015
85	(Sweden) Antonio Lindbäck	17	15	7th	2004, 2005–2007, 2009–2010, 2011–2013, 2015

=== Qualified substitutes ===
The following riders were nominated as substitutes:

#	Riders	2015 place	GP Ch place
66	(Sweden) Fredrik Lindgren	—	4
52	(Denmark) Michael Jepsen Jensen	11	—
21	(Czech Republic) Václav Milík	26	6

Fredrik Lindgren replaced the injured Jarosław Hampel for the first six rounds. Hampel then officially withdrew from the competition on 22 August 2016, promoting Lindgren to a full-time place in the series.

== Calendar ==
The 2016 season consisted of 11 events, one less than the 2015 series.

Round	Date	City and venue	Winner	Runner-up	3rd placed	4th placed	Results
1	April 30	(Slovenia) Krško , Slovenia; Matija Gubec Stadium	(Denmark) Peter Kildemand	(Australia) Jason Doyle	(Australia) Chris Holder	(United Kingdom) Tai Woffinden	results
2	May 14	(Poland) Warsaw , Poland; Stadion Narodowy	(United Kingdom) Tai Woffinden	(United States) Greg Hancock	(Slovenia) Matej Žagar	(Australia) Chris Holder	results
3	June 11	(Denmark) Horsens , Denmark; CASA Arena	(Poland) Maciej Janowski	(Australia) Chris Holder	(United Kingdom) Tai Woffinden	(Denmark) Nicki Pedersen	results
4	June 25	(Czech Republic) Prague , Czech Republic; Markéta Stadium	(Australia) Jason Doyle	(United States) Greg Hancock	(United Kingdom) Chris Harris	(Denmark) Niels Kristian Iversen	results
5	July 9	(United Kingdom) Cardiff , Great Britain; Principality Stadium	(Sweden) Antonio Lindbäck	(United Kingdom) Tai Woffinden	(Poland) Bartosz Zmarzlik	(United States) Greg Hancock	results
6	August 14	(Sweden) Målilla , Sweden; G&B Stadium	(United States) Greg Hancock	(Australia) Jason Doyle	(Poland) Piotr Pawlicki Jr.	(Australia) Chris Holder	results
7	August 27	Gorzów , Poland; Edward Jancarz Stadium	(Australia) Jason Doyle	(United Kingdom) Tai Woffinden	(Australia) Chris Holder	(Poland) Bartosz Zmarzlik	results
8	September 10	(Germany) Teterow , Germany; Bergring Arena	(Australia) Jason Doyle	(Poland) Bartosz Zmarzlik	(United States) Greg Hancock	(Denmark) Niels Kristian Iversen	results
9	September 24	Stockholm , Sweden; Friends Arena	(Australia) Jason Doyle	(Australia) Chris Holder	(Sweden) Fredrik Lindgren	(Slovenia) Matej Žagar	results
10	October 1	Toruń , Poland; Rose Motoarena	(Denmark) Niels Kristian Iversen	(United States) Greg Hancock	(Poland) Bartosz Zmarzlik	(Slovenia) Matej Žagar	results
11	October 22	(Australia) Melbourne , Australia; Etihad Stadium	(Australia) Chris Holder	(United Kingdom) Tai Woffinden	(Poland) Bartosz Zmarzlik	(Sweden) Antonio Lindbäck	results

== Final Classification ==
Qualifies for next season's Grand Prix series
Full-time Grand Prix rider
Wild card, track reserve or qualified reserve

Pos.	Rider	Points	SVN (Slovenia)	POL (Poland)	DEN (Denmark)	CZE (Czech Republic)	GBR (United Kingdom)	SWE (Sweden)	PL2 (Poland)	GER (Germany)	SCA (Sweden)	PL3 (Poland)	AUS (Australia)
Gold	(United States) (45) Greg Hancock (C)	139	10	14	14	18	10	17	11	15	9	16	5
Silver	(United Kingdom) (108) Tai Woffinden	130	10	14	15	9	15	8	15	10	11	8	15
Bronze	(Poland) (95) Bartosz Zmarzlik	128	8	10	7	13	13	10	14	13	12	13	15
4	(Australia) (23) Chris Holder	126	14	12	13	5	6	12	15	8	13	11	17
5	(Australia) (69) Jason Doyle	123	13	5	7	17	12	17	16	17	19	0	–
6	(Poland) (777) Piotr Pawlicki Jr.	99	8	4	5	6	14	13	10	11	10	10	8
7	(Sweden) (85) Antonio Lindbäck	93	10	10	10	5	18	7	4	6	4	5	14
8	(Denmark) (88) Niels Kristian Iversen	91	8	4	7	11	3	8	5	11	7	15	12
9	(Poland) (71) Maciej Janowski	90	10	10	16	5	11	12	6	2	8	5	5
10	(Slovenia) (55) Matej Žagar	90	4	14	8	5	8	3	4	3	15	15	11
11	(Sweden) (66) Fredrik Lindgren	88	7	12	2	11	2	8	11	6	14	9	6
12	(Denmark) (25) Peter Kildemand	68	15	6	7	6	4	9	3	6	6	2	4
13	(Denmark) (3) Nicki Pedersen	62	10	4	10	8	5	6	12	7	–	–	–
14	(Sweden) (100) Andreas Jonsson	53	6	8	8	6	9	2	0	–	–	7	7
15	(United Kingdom) (37) Chris Harris	40	3	3	4	10	1	2	4	6	0	3	4
16	(Denmark) (52) Michael Jepsen Jensen	31	–	–	–	–	–	–	–	7	4	10	10
17	(Poland) (16) Patryk Dudek	8	–	8	–	–	–	–	–	–	–	–	–
17	(Germany) (16) Martin Smolinski	8	–	–	–	–	–	–	–	8	–	–	–
17	(Poland) (16) Paweł Przedpełski	8	–	–	–	–	–	–	–	–	–	8	–
20	(United Kingdom) (16) Danny King	7	–	–	–	–	7	–	–	–	–	–	–
20	(Poland) (16) Krzysztof Kasprzak	7	–	–	–	–	–	–	7	–	–	–	–
22	(Denmark) (16) Anders Thomsen	5	–	–	5	–	–	–	–	–	–	–	–
22	(Sweden) (17) Kim Nilsson	5	–	–	–	–	–	–	–	–	5	–	–
24	(Sweden) (16) Peter Ljung	4	–	–	–	–	–	4	–	–	–	–	–
25	(Czech Republic) (16) Václav Milík Jr.	3	–	–	–	3	–	–	–	–	–	–	–
26	(Germany) (17) Tobias Kroner	2	–	–	–	–	–	–	–	2	–	–	–
26	(Australia) (16) Sam Masters	2	–	–	–	–	–	–	–	–	–	–	2
26	(Australia) (17) Brady Kurtz	2	–	–	–	–	–	–	–	–	–	–	2
26	(Australia) (19) Jack Holder	2	–	–	–	–	–	–	–	–	–	–	2
26	(Slovenia) (17) Nick Škorja	2	1	–	–	1	–	–	–	–	–	–	–
30	(Slovenia) (16) Denis Štojs	1	1	–	–	–	–	–	–	–	–	–	–
30	(Poland) (17) Daniel Kaczmarek	1	–	–	–	–	–	–	1	–	–	–	–
30	(Sweden) (16) Jacob Thorssell	1	–	–	–	–	–	–	–	–	1	–	–
30	(Poland) (17) Kacper Woryna	1	–	–	–	–	–	–	–	–	–	1	–
35	(Slovenia) (18) Matic Ivačič	0	0	–	–	–	–	–	–	–	–	–	–
35	(Poland) (18) Oskar Bober	0	–	–	–	–	–	–	–	–	–	0	–
35	(Australia) (18) Max Fricke	0	–	–	–	–	–	–	–	–	–	–	0
Pos.	Rider	Points	SVN (Slovenia)	POL (Poland)	DEN (Denmark)	CZE (Czech Republic)	GBR (United Kingdom)	SWE (Sweden)	PL2 (Poland)	GER (Germany)	SCA (Sweden)	PL3 (Poland)	AUS (Australia)

== See also ==
- 2016 Individual Speedway Junior World Championship
- 2017 Speedway Grand Prix
