= Jason Doyle =

Australian motorcycle racer (born 1985)

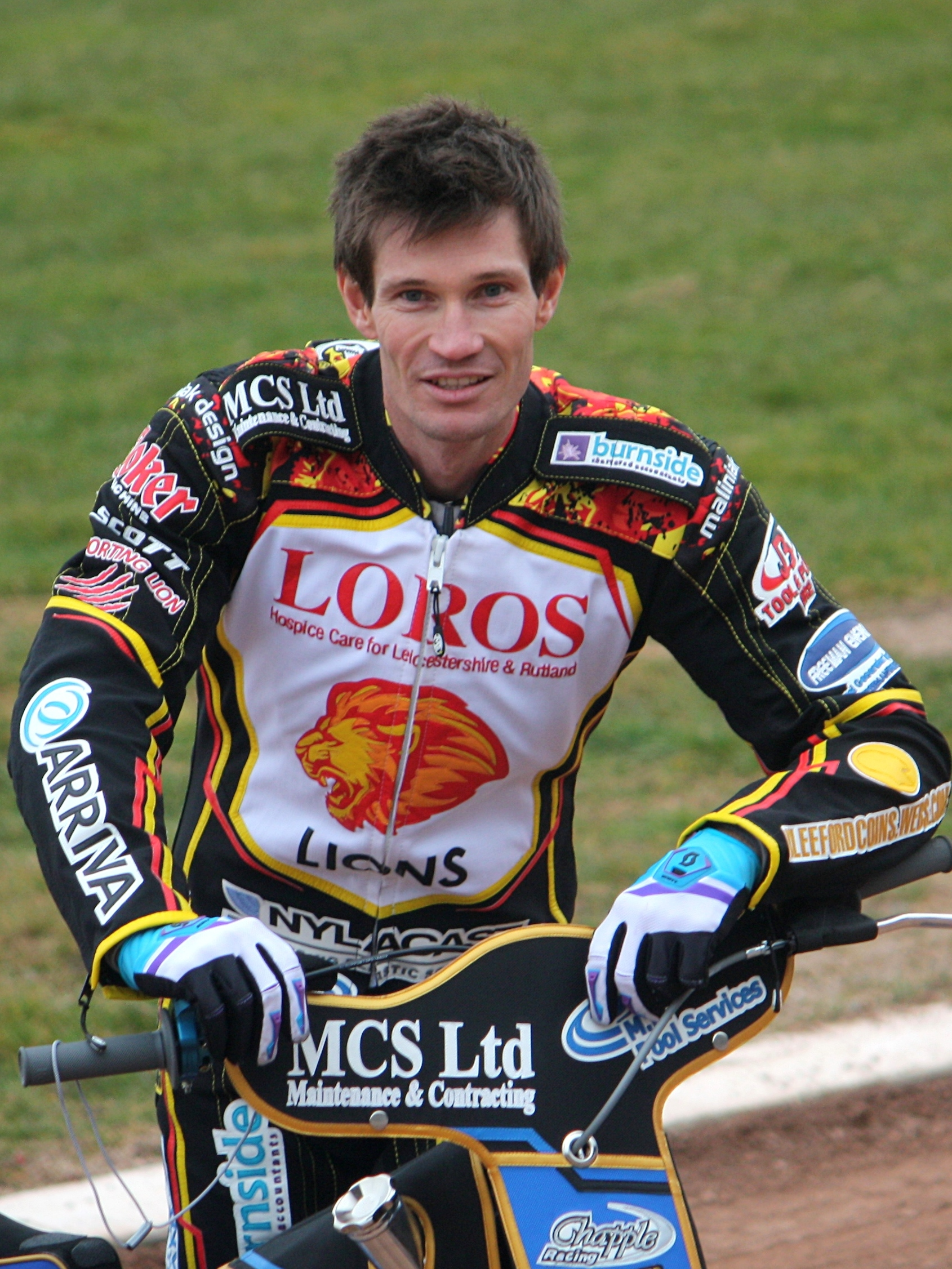
- Born: 6 October 1985 (age 41); Newcastle, New South Wales
- Nationality: Australian

Career history

Great Britain
- 2005–2006: Isle of Wight Islanders
- 2006–2007, 2010–2011: Poole Pirates
- 2008, 2012–2013, 2018: Somerset Rebels
- 2011: Newport Wasps
- 2011: Rye House Rockets
- 2012, 2016–2017, 2019: Swindon Robins
- 2013: Birmingham Brummies
- 2014–2015: Leicester Lions
- 2022–2025: Ipswich Witches

Poland:
- 2008, 2013: Rawicz
- 2009–2010: Gniezno
- 2011: Piła
- 2014: Łódź
- 2015, 2018–2019: Toruń
- 2016–2017: Zielona Góra
- 2020, 2025: Częstochowa
- 2021–2022: Leszno
- 2023, 2026: Krosno
- 2024: Grudziadz

Sweden:
- 2009: Masarna
- 2014: Vargarna
- 2015, 2021: Dackarna
- 2016–2019: Rospiggarna
- 2020, 2026: Västervik
- 2022–2023: Indianerna

Denmark
- 2012–2013: Fjelsted
- 2014–2015, 2024: Region Varde
- 2016: Grindsted
- 2019, 2025–2026: Esbjerg

Speedway Grand Prix statistics
- SGP number: 69
- Starts: 115
- Finalist: 35 times
- Winner: 7 times

Individual honours
- 2017: World Champion
- 2015: Australian Champion
- 2015: South Australian Champion
- 2015, 2018: UK League Riders’ Champion
- 2018, 2019, 2020: Golden Helmet of Pardubice
- 2021: Ekstraliga Riders’ Champion

Team honours
- 2022, 2025, 2026: World team champion
- 2017, 2019, 2025: UK Premiership
- 2010, 2023: UK KO Cup
- 2022: UK Pairs
- 2016: Swedish Elitserien
- 2008: Premier League KO Cup
- 2012: Premier League Cup
- 2013: Premier League Pairs
- 2013: Premier League

Jason Kevin Doyle (born 6 October 1985) is an Australian motorcycle speedway rider. He became World Champion in 2017 after winning the 2017 Speedway Grand Prix.

Doyle is a member of the Australia national speedway team and represented his country in the Speedway World Cup and was a part of the Australian team that won the 2022 Speedway of Nations.

== Career ==
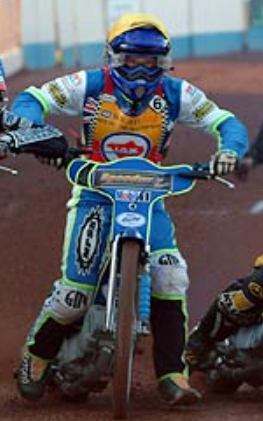
Doyle riding for his first UK club, the Isle of Wight Islanders

Born in Newcastle, New South Wales, Doyle made his British speedway debut in March 2005 for Premier League team the Isle of Wight Islanders. In 2006, Doyle remained with the Isle of Wight and signed for the Poole Pirates as their number 8 before moving up to the Elite League full-time with Poole in 2007. He moved to Premier League team the Somerset Rebels in 2008 after failing to secure a team place at Poole, although he still remained a Poole asset. During the 2008 season, Doyle finished as runner up in the Premier League Pairs Championship with Emil Kramer and represented Australia at Under-23 Test level. He also won the Premier League Knockout Cup with Somerset.

Doyle missed the 2009 season after tearing the rotator cuff in his shoulder, but returned in 2010 for the Poole Pirates. In 2012, Doyle led the Rebels to League Cup victory and the team narrowly missed on winning the Premier League; He was voted Rider of the Year by the club's supporters.

In the 2013 season, Doyle signed for the Birmingham Brummies, who reached the Elite League play-off final, losing to Poole Pirates. He also led the Somerset Rebels to the Premier League title and the Premier League Pairs Championship partnering Josh Grajczonek, during the 2013 Premier League speedway season.

In December 2013, Doyle signed for Leicester Lions for the 2014 season. Doyle fell foul of work permit rules and was initially denied a visa that would allow him to ride in the UK in 2014; The situation was resolved before the start of the 2014 season although he was only permitted to ride in one league, so was released by Somerset. He stayed with Lions in 2015 before returning to parent club Swindon Robins for 2016.

In 2013, Doyle won the Master of Speedway title in Bockhorn, Germany. In Sweden, Doyle moved from Vastervik to Dackarna while in Poland he left Lodz to join Torun.

Doyle narrowly missed winning his first Australian Championship when he finished only 2 points behind Chris Holder over the three rounds of the 2014 Championship. In the "A" Final of the last round at the Gillman Speedway, Doyle fell and was excluded from the re-run and with Holder finishing second he was able to win his 5th national crown. Going into the round Doyle and Holder had been tied on 38 points after the first two rounds with Doyle winning the opening round in Kurri Kurri and Holder the second round at Undera Park.

On 28 December 2014, Doyle won the 2014/15 South Australian Championship at Gillman. Doyle became the first rider from NSW to win the SA title since Aub Lawson won the 3-Lap Championship in 1949. Doyle's win also makes it 8 SA Championships in succession not won by a South Australian rider. On 10 January 2015, Doyle won the final round of the 2015 Australian Individual Speedway Championship at Kurri Kurri, to become Australian Champion.

In 2015, Doyle was the UK League Riders' Championship winner, a feat he repeated in 2018.

Doyle returned to Swindon Robins for the 2019 season, going on to win the SGB Premiership and KO Cup. In 2022, he signed for the Ipswich Witches for the SGB Premiership 2022 season and won the Premiership pairs and was the stand out rider in the league, finishing top of the league averages.

Doyle remained with Ipswich for the SGB Premiership 2023, where he helped the club win the KO Cup and re-signed for the SGB Premiership 2024 season and re-signed for the 2025 Premiership.

== International ==
Doyle has represented the Australian team at the Speedway World Cup, finishing third with the team in 2013 in the Czech Republic and again in 2014 in Poland. Many judges believed he came of age in the 2014 Final at the Polonia Bydgoszcz Stadium, winning four of his six rides and being the second highest scorer on the night with 13 behind Denmark's triple world champion Nicki Pedersen.

With his second place at the 2014 Speedway Grand Prix Challenge on 20 September in Lonigo, Italy, Doyle qualified for the 2015 Speedway Grand Prix World Championship Series, joining Australian teammates Chris Holder and wild card rider Troy Batchelor in the Speedway Grand Prix. Doyle had a mixed year in 2015, finishing the series in fifth spot with a best finish of second at the penultimate round in Toruń. He finished off the year qualifying for the final at home in Australia, but a crash in the first turn with American Greg Hancock resulted in a short stay in hospital after suffering neck and chest injuries.

On 25 June 2016, Doyle won his first ever SGP when he took out the Speedway Grand Prix of Czech Republic at the Markéta Stadium in Prague. After finishing in sixth place in the next round in Britain, he returned to the podium with second in Sweden before winning the next three Grand Prix in Gorzów, Germany and Stockholm to sit at the top of the world championship, five points ahead of three-time champion Greg Hancock after 9 of the 11 rounds. Doyle's three SGP wins in a row was the first time a rider had taken a hat-trick since fellow Aussie Jason Crump had won three in a row on his way to winning the 2006 championship, but a crash in his first ride at the Toruń round in which he dislocated his shoulder and broke his elbow put paid to his 2016 championship hopes. He would bounce back however in 2017, going on to clinch the world title after dominating the Speedway Grand Prix series, despite riding with a broken foot for much of the season, winning the Czech Republic and Australian rounds. He clinched the title in style in Australia, dropping only two points all night on his way to winning the meeting in front of his home fans.

Doyle finished in tenth place during the 2022 Speedway World Championship, after securing 83 points during the 2022 Speedway Grand Prix. However, the highlight of his season was winning the 2022 Speedway of Nations for Australia with Jack Holder and Max Fricke. He was later selected as a full time rider for the 2023 Speedway Grand Prix. In 2023, he was part of the Australian team that finished fourth in the 2023 Speedway World Cup final.

Doyle started the 2024 season well, proving almost unbeatable for Ipswich and winning the 2024 Speedway Grand Prix of Poland but then crashed heavily in a league match and broke four ribs and suffered a lung contusion. His world title challenge ended because he would miss the majority of the season. His injury woes continued as he was forced to withdraw from round 2 and miss round 3 of the 2025 Speedway Grand Prix.

Despite an injury hit season, Doyle still finished tenth in the World Championship and helped Ipswich win the SGB Premiership 2025. He finished his season on a high, winning the 2025 Speedway of Nations (his second World team championship).

== Major results ==
=== World individual Championship ===
- 2015 Speedway Grand Prix – 5th (114 pts)
- 2016 Speedway Grand Prix – 5th (123 pts)
- 2017 Speedway Grand Prix – Champion (161 pts)
- 2018 Speedway Grand Prix – 7th (93 pts)
- 2019 Speedway Grand Prix – 7th (84 pts)
- 2020 Speedway Grand Prix – 6th (87 pts)
- 2021 Speedway Grand Prix – 9th (87 pts)
- 2022 Speedway Grand Prix – 10th (83 pts)
- 2023 Speedway Grand Prix – 8th (96 pts)
- 2024 Speedway Grand Prix – 16th (47 pts)
- 2025 Speedway Grand Prix – 10th (66 pts)
- 2026 Speedway Grand Prix – 9th (73 pts)

=== Grand Prix wins ===
- 1: 2016 Speedway Grand Prix of Czech Republic
- 2: 2016 Speedway Grand Prix of Poland (Gorzów)
- 3: 2016 Speedway Grand Prix of Germany
- 4: 2016 Speedway Grand Prix of Sweden
- 5: 2017 Speedway Grand Prix of Czech Republic
- 6: 2017 Speedway Grand Prix of Australia
- 7: 2024 Speedway Grand Prix of Poland (Warsaw)

=== World Team Championship ===
- 2013 Speedway World Cup – 3rd
- 2014 Speedway World Cup – 3rd
- 2015 Speedway World Cup – 4th
- 2016 Speedway World Cup – 4th
- 2017 Speedway World Cup – 5th
- 2018 Speedway of Nations – 4th
- 2019 Speedway of Nations – 3rd
- 2020 Speedway of Nations – 5th
- 2021 Speedway of Nations – 4th
- 2022 Speedway of Nations – Champion
- 2023 Speedway World Cup – 4th
- 2025 Speedway of Nations – Champion
- 2026 Speedway World Cup – Champion
