= Tobias Kroner =

German speedway rider

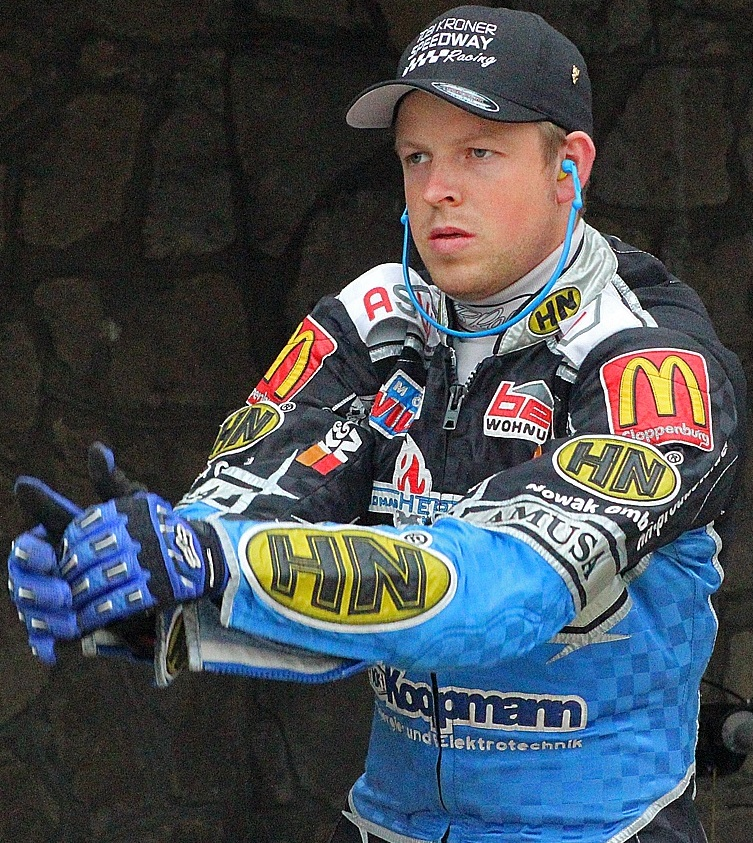
- Born: 16 October 1985 (age 41); Dohren, Germany
- Nationality: German

Career history

Great Britain
- 2005: Oxford Cheetahs
- 2006-2009: Ipswich Witches
- 2010: Belle Vue Aces

Poland
- 2007: Łódź
- 2008-2010: Gdańsk
- 2011-2012: Ostrów
- 2012-2013: Kraków

Individual honours
- 2012: German Champion

Tobias Kroner (born 16 October 1985) is a former motorcycle speedway rider from Germany. He earned 9 international caps for the German national speedway team.

== Speedway career ==
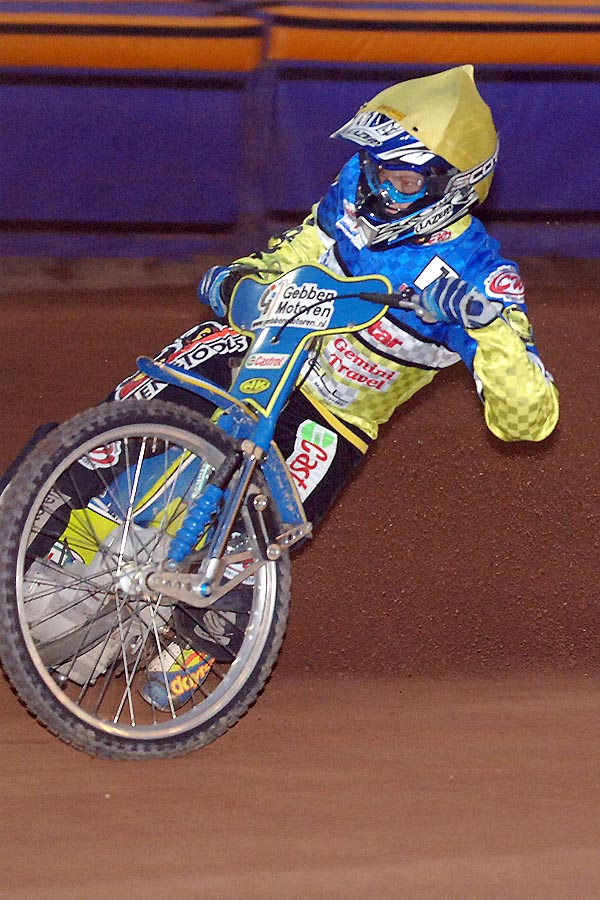
Kroner riding for Ipswich

Kroner began his British league career after he signed for Oxford for the 2005 Elite League speedway season. He struggled during the season but switched to Ipswich Witches the following season where his form began to improve.

In 2007, Kroner remained with Ipswich and made his Polish league debut for Orzeł Łódź in the Polish Speedway First League. He then joined Wybrzeże Gdańsk, with whom he reached the Ekstraliga.

After four seasons with Ipswich, Kroner would have one more season in Britain riding for the Belle Vue Aces during the 2010 Elite League speedway season. He continued to ride in Poland, racing for Ostrów Wielkopolski and Wanda Kraków.

In 2012, Kroner became the champion of Germany after winning the German Individual Speedway Championship.
