= Chris Holder =

Australian speedway rider (born 1987)

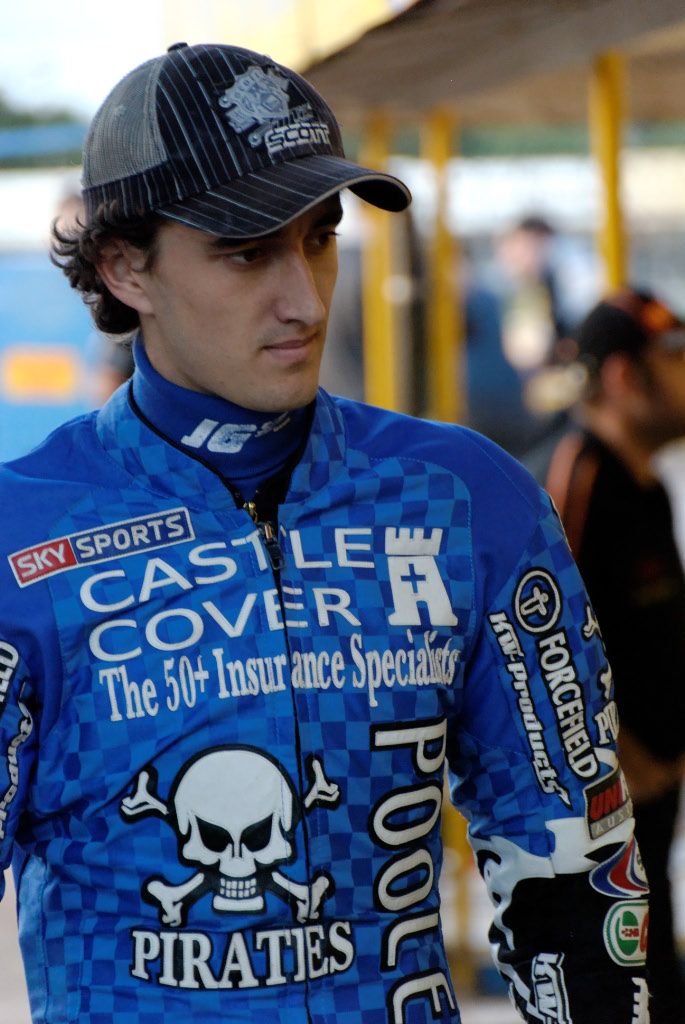
- Born: 24 September 1987 (age 39); Sydney, New South Wales
- Nationality: Australian

Career history

Great Britain
- 2006–2007: Isle of Wight Islanders
- 2008–2013, 2015: Poole Pirates
- 2023–2025: Sheffield Tigers

Poland
- 2007: Wrocław
- 2008–2021: Toruń
- 2022, 2024: Ostrów
- 2023: Leszno
- 2025: Rybnik

Sweden
- 2007, 2012–2015: Piraterna
- 2008–2011, 2016–2018: Lejonen
- 2019–2022: Indianerna
- 2023: Västervik

Denmark
- 2014: Region Varde
- 2024–2025: Slangerup

Speedway Grand Prix statistics
- Starts: 94
- Podiums: 20 (5-8-7)
- Finalist: 24 times
- Winner: 5 times

Individual honours
- 2012: World Champion
- 2008, 2010, 2011, 2012, 2014: Australian Champion
- 2005, 2006, 2007, 2008: Australian Under-21 Champion
- 2005, 2006: Australian Long Track Champion
- 2006, 2007, 2008, 2009, 2011: NSW State Champion
- 2008: WA State Champion
- 2014: Golden Helmet of Pardubice

Team honours
- 2008: Polish league champion
- 2008, 2011, 2013 2014, 2015, 2023: UK league champion
- 2009: UK Pairs Champion
- 2024: UK Knockout Cup winner
- 2008, 2009: Swedish league champion
- 2024, 2025: Danish league champion

Christopher Robert Holder (born 24 September 1987 in Sydney, New South Wales) is an Australian speedway rider, who was the 2012 World Speedway Champion. He is also five-time Australian champion (2008, 2010, 2011, 2012, and 2014.

== Career ==
Holder won the Australian Under-21 Championship in 2005, 2006, 2007 and 2008, in addition to finishing runner-up in the Under-21 World Championship in 2007 and 2008.

Holder started racing in the United Kingdom with the Isle of Wight Islanders in 2006. In 2007, he won the Premier League Pairs Championship partnering Jason Bunyan for the Isle of Wight, during the 2007 Premier League speedway season and was part of the Isle of Wight four who won the Premier League Four-Team Championship, held on 8 July 2007, at the East of England Arena Additionally in 2007, he rode for Atlas Wrocław in the Polish Speedway Ekstraliga.

Holder won the Swedish Allsvenskan in 2007 and the Elitserien in 2008 and 2009 with Lejonen. In 2008, Holder signed for KS Toruń in Polish Ekstraliga and won the league championship.

In October 2007, the Poole Pirates announced that Holder would ride for them in 2008 in the Elite League. Holder won the Elite League Championship, and became a league winner with all three of his domestic teams in 2008.

Holder finished second in the 2007 Junior World Championship and was also selected to ride in the Australian team for the 2007 Speedway World Cup, finishing in third place. Holder again represented Australian in the 2008 Speedway World Cup.

Holder won the Australian Championship in 2008, winning all five rounds with a record maximum 100 points. He has won the Australian Under 21 Championship for four consecutive years (2005–2008), equalling a record set by Leigh Adams. In October 2008, Holder finished runner-up in the Junior World Championship for the second year in succession to Emil Saifutdinov.

After Lejonen's relegation from the Swedish Elite League, Holder changed club to Swedish champions Piraterna.

In 2010 and 2012, Holder won the British Speedway Grand Prix at Cardiff's Millennium Stadium. He won the Elite League Riders' Championship, held at Abbey Stadium on 20 October 2012.

On 7 October 2012, Holder became Speedway World Champion, joining Lionel Van Praag (1936), Bluey Wilkinson (1938), Jack Young (1951, 1952), Jason Crump (2004, 2006, 2009), and Jason Doyle (2017) as Australians who have won speedways ultimate individual prize. His season would end on a sour note however, as Poole lost the Elite League title to Swindon, and Holder was injured three days later during Poole's Knockout Cup semi-final against Peterborough.

Holder's 2013 season had started well and he was sitting in a top-three position in the World Championship. Then in July 2013 during a British league match at Coventry’s Brandon Stadium, Holder sustained serious injuries in a heat 15 crash. The injuries included a dislocated and broken hip, a broken pelvis, left shoulder and right heel, and would end his season.

Holder won his fifth Australian Individual Speedway Championship title held over three rounds in January 2014, on his comeback from his 2013 injuries. He also captained the Australian team that finished third in the 2014 Speedway World Cup Final in Poland.

After initially considering giving the 2015 Australian Championship to be held in early January a miss in order to get himself fit for the 2015 Speedway Grand Prix season, Holder decided to defend his title. Bike problems in the first round at the Gillman Speedway in Adelaide saw him only finish seventh on points with eight and only just gain a place in the "B" Final where he finished third. Things improved considerably in the second round at Olympic Park in Mildura for round 2 where he finished equal second on points before finishing second in the "A" Final to World Cup teammate and championship leader Jason Doyle. That was where his title defence ended though as a crash in practice for the third round at the Undera Park Speedway saw him hospitalised with a suspected broken wrist. However it later emerged that Holder had not broken his wrist but had dislocated it and bent a plate previously inserted requiring him to have further surgery to replace the plate and relocate his wrist.

By his own standards, the 2012 World Champion had a down on par SGP season in 2015, with his best finish being 2nd at the British SGP. After a poor showing at the Australian SGP in Melbourne where he only scored two points from his five rides, he ultimately finished eighth in the series just grabbing the last automatic qualifying spot for 2016 by three points from Danish rider Peter Kildemand. Following the SGP season, Holder announced that he would not be contesting the Australian season in an effort to get himself right for 2016, planning on racing only two meetings at home over the summer. In a return to form, Holder won the Solo Final at the Darcy Ward Benefit Meeting held at the Gillman Speedway on 7 November just two weeks after the Australian GP, leading home fellow Aussie SGP rider Troy Batchelor and surprising young German Kai Huckenbeck. On the night Holder also swapped two wheels for three and did four quick laps on the back of Mark Plaisted's 1000cc sidecar.

On 22 October 2016, Holder won the Australian SGP to secure 4th place in the 2016 Speedway Grand Prix standings. Holder won the final at the Etihad Stadium from outgoing World Champion Tai Woffinden, Polish rider Bartosz Zmarzlik and Sweden's Antonio Lindbäck. It was Holder's first SGP victory since winning the 2012 British SGP. After two difficult seasons in the world championship marred by injuries, Holder bounced back in 2016 to ride in 7 of the 11 Finals in the championship series with one win, two second and two third placings. Holder's younger brother Jack also rode in Melbourne as the second track reserve for the meeting and finished 2nd in his first ride.

In 2023, Holder was part of the Australian team that finished fourth in the 2023 Speedway World Cup final. He also experienced league success after joining Sheffield Tigers for the latter part of the SGB Premiership 2023 season. He re-signed for Sheffield in 2024 and won the Knockout Cup with them. Holder helped Slangerup win the Danish Speedway League during the 2024 Danish speedway season.

During the 2025 Danish speedway season, Holder helped Slangerup retain the Speedway Ligaen title.

== Family ==
Holder's brother, James, also rode in the UK with the Plymouth Devils in the Premier League, and younger brother Jack is an World team champion.

== Major results ==
=== World individual Championship ===
- 2010 Speedway Grand Prix - 8th, 96 pts
- 2011 Speedway Grand Prix - 8th, 101 pts
- 2012 Speedway Grand Prix - World champion, 160 pts
- 2013 Speedway Grand Prix - 12th, 82 pts
- 2014 Speedway Grand Prix - 7th, 100 pts
- 2015 Speedway Grand Prix - 8th, 95 pts
- 2016 Speedway Grand Prix - 4th, 126 pts
- 2017 Speedway Grand Prix - 10th, 85 pts
- 2018 Speedway Grand Prix - 12th, 65 pts

=== Grand Prix wins ===
- 1: 2010 Speedway Grand Prix of Great Britain
- 2: 2011 Speedway Grand Prix of Sweden
- 3: 2012 Speedway Grand Prix of Europe
- 4: 2012 Speedway Grand Prix of Great Britain
- 5: 2016 Speedway Grand Prix of Australia

=== Speedway World Cup ===
- 2007 – (Poland) Leszno, Alfred Smoczyk Stadium – 3rd – 29pts (3)
- 2008 – (Denmark) Vojens, Speedway Center – 4th – 21pts (4)
- 2009 – (Poland) Leszno, Alfred Smoczyk Stadium – 2nd – 43pts (10)
- 2011 – (Poland) Gorzów Wielkopolski, Edward Jancarz Stadium – 2nd – 45pts (15)
- 2012 – (Sweden) Målilla, G&B Stadium – 2nd – 39pts (16)
- 2014 – (Poland) Bydgoszcz, Polonia Bydgoszcz Stadium – 3rd – 36pts (11)
- 2015 – (Denmark) Vojens, Speedway Center – 4th – 26pts (8)
- 2016 – (England) Manchester, National Speedway Stadium – 4th – 22pts (10)
- 2023 – (Poland) Wrocław, Stadion Olimpijski – 4th – 27pts (1)

=== Individual U-21 World Championship ===
- 2006 – (Italy) Terenzano, Pista Olimpia Terenzano – 12th – 5pts
- 2007 – (Poland) Ostrów Wielkopolski, Municipal Stadium – 2nd – 14pts
- 2008 – (Czech Republic) Pardubice, Svítkov Stadion – 2nd – 12+3pts
