= Maciej Janowski =

Polish speedway rider (born 1991)

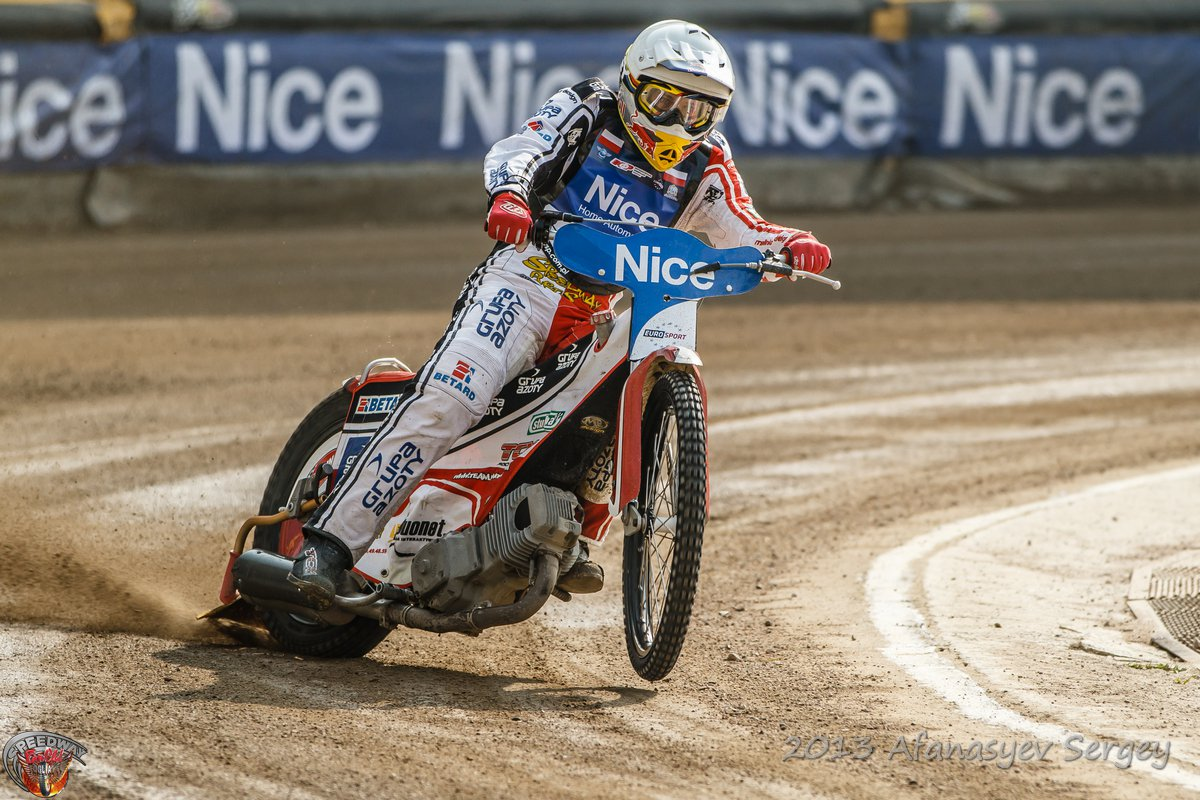
- Born: 6 August 1991 (age 35); Wrocław, Poland
- Nationality: Polish
- Website: Official website

Career history

Poland
- 2007–2011, 2014–2026: Wrocław
- 2012–2013: Tarnów

Great Britain
- 2010–2011: Swindon
- 2012: King's Lynn
- 2013–2015: Poole
- 2024–2025: Oxford

Sweden
- 2009, 2014: Rospiggarna
- 2010–2013, 2024: Piraterna
- 2016–2019, 2021–2023: Dackarna
- 2026: Smederna

Speedway Grand Prix statistics
- SGP number: 71
- Starts: 100
- Finalist: 31 times
- Winner: 8 times

Individual honours
- 2022: World Championship bronze
- 2015, 2020, 2024, 2026: Polish Champion
- 2011: World U-21 champion

Team honours
- 2013, 2017, 2023: World team champion
- 2022: European Team champion
- 2008, 2009, 2012: U21 World team winner
- 2023: Swedish Eliserien champion

Maciej Janowski (born 6 August 1991 in Wrocław, Poland) is a Polish speedway rider who is a member of Poland national speedway team.

== Career ==
Janowski passed speedway licence test (Licencja "Ż") on 7 August 2007 at 16 years old; five days later he rode in his first meeting in Polish Ekstraliga (Wrocław vs Rzeszów 48:42). In his first heat, he beat Rzeszów' rider Andreas Messing from Sweden. His fourth meeting was Tournament of Junior National Team Reservs (Turniej zaplecza kadry juniorów). In this meeting, he was fourth. He won qualification to U-19 Bronze Helmet Final; Janowski was 13th (he was only 16 years old). With Atlas Wrocław he started in European Club Champions' Cup Final - Janowski scored five points, but Atlas was last.

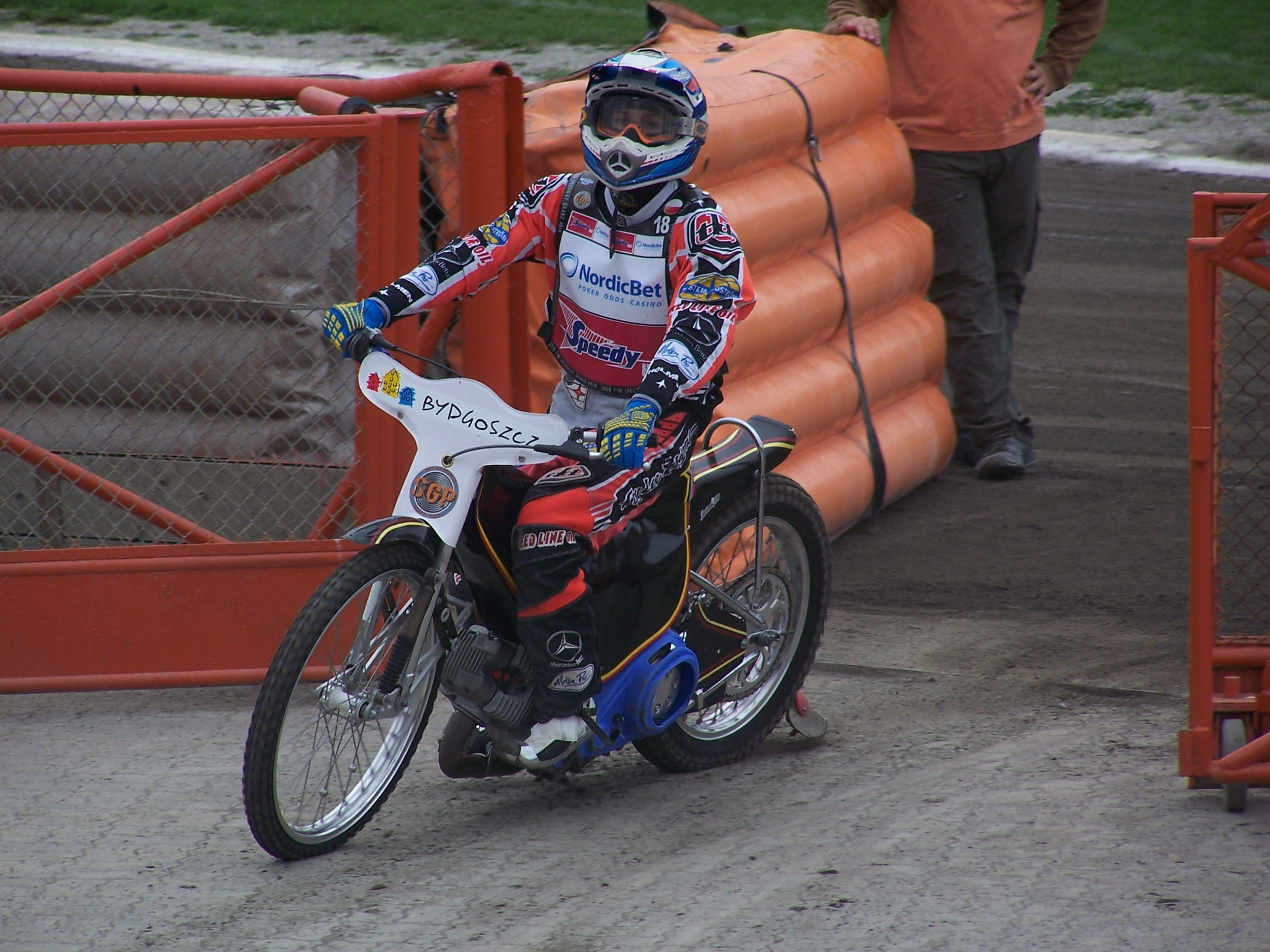
Janowski in Polish SGP.

In the 2008 season, Janowski started in the Team U-19 European Championship Final. He was the best rider in the Polish team scoring 15 points despite the eteam finishing last), but Poland was last. In August of the same year, he won the Individual U-21 Polish Championship in Rybnik and was second in the Individual U-19 European Championship Final. In September, he was the best rider in the Poland team and he won Team U-21 World Champion title. He was second in the Polish Bronze Helmet Final and won the Polish Silver Helmet Final. At the 2008 Speedway Grand Prix of Germany in Bydgoszcz, Janowski was nominated as first track reserve at 2008 FIM Final Speedway Grand Prix. However, when Niels Kristian Iversen was injured, Janowski replaced him in GP event. He finished 15th and scored one point, after beating Martin Smolinski.

Weekly "Tygodnik Żużlowy" (Speedway Weekly) awarded Janowski as Junior of the Year. Speedway Chapter of Main Commission of Speedway Sport (part of the Polish Motor Union) awarded him and Przemysław Pawlicki for one of the best debuts in Polish speedway history.

In 2009, Janowski rode for Atlas Wrocław in Poland, Rospiggarna in Sweden and MSC Diedenberge in Germany. In Sweden, he rode in nine matches and scored 4.52 point per match. Janowski was unsuccessful in defending his Under-21 Polish Champion title, scoring eight points and finished eighth. However, he did win the Bronze Helmet Final, at his home track in Wrocław, scoring a maximum 15 points. On 25 September, he was second in Silver Helmet Final, losing to Grzegorz Zengota by two points.

On 11 July, Janowski competed in the Individual U-19 European Championship Final and won the silver medal after winning a run off with Martin Vaculík and Artem Laguta. The gold medal was won by Przemysław Pawlicki. Janowski and Pawlicki were the highest scorer for the Polish team in the Team U-19 European Championship Final on 23 August and Poland won U-19 European Champion title. On 5 September in Gorzów Wielkopolski he scored 13 points for Poland, and the team successfully defended their U-21 World Champion title at Under-21 Speedway World Cup. On 3 October will be started in Individual U-21 World Championship Final.

Like his Rospiggarna Hallstravik team-mate, Greg Hancock, Janowski moved to Piraterna Motala before the 2010 season. On 18 August, it was announced that Janowski would join the Swindon Robins in the British Elite League for the remainder of the season. Maciej won the 2010 Polish Under-21 Championship, held in Toruń, scoring a 15-point maximum. Janowski also rode in the U21-World Cup, and was second, beating the main rival Maksim Bogdanows in Pardubice.

In 2011, Janowski became the World Under 21 champion, and the following season, he raced for Kings Lynn Stars in the 2012 British speedway season, in the Elite League.

In 2013, Janowski won the Speedway World Cup with Poland, scoring 12 points in the final. Also in 2013, he moved to Poole Pirates for the 2013 Elite League speedway season. He would stay for three seasons and helped Poole win three consecutive Elite League titles.

A second World Cup winners medal came his way at the 2017 Speedway World Cup, he topped scored for Poland in the final, as the team finished eight points ahead of Sweden.

In 2022, Janowski won the bronze medal in the 2022 Speedway World Championship, after securing 106 points during the 2022 Speedway Grand Prix. Also in 2022, he was a member of the Polish team that won the inaugural European Team Speedway Championship.

In 2023, Janowski was part of the Polish team that won the gold medal in the 2023 Speedway World Cup final, his last lap overtaking of Robert Lambert sealed the title for Poland and it was a third World Cup success for Janowski. However his individual season ended with a disappointing 14th place finish in the 2023 Speedway Grand Prix.

Janowski returned to ride in Britain after signing for the Oxford Spires and in Sweden for Piraterna for the 2024 season.

== Family ==
His parents are Piotr and Beata. He has two brothers Wojciech and Krzysztof.

== Major results ==
=== World individual Championship ===
- 2008 Speedway Grand Prix – 29th (1 pt)
- 2012 Speedway Grand Prix – 23rd (8 pts)
- 2014 Speedway Grand Prix – 24th (7 pts)
- 2015 Speedway Grand Prix – 7th (106 pts)
- 2016 Speedway Grand Prix – 10th (90 pts)
- 2017 Speedway Grand Prix – 4th (122 pts)
- 2018 Speedway Grand Prix – 4th (104 pts)
- 2019 Speedway Grand Prix – 6th (87 pts)
- 2020 Speedway Grand Prix – 4th (107 pts)
- 2021 Speedway Grand Prix – 4th (129 pts)
- 2022 Speedway Grand Prix – 3rd (106 pts)
- 2023 Speedway Grand Prix – 14th (43 pts)
- 2024 Speedway Grand Prix – 14th (52 pts)
- 2025 Speedway Grand Prix – 19th (8 pts)
- 2026 Speedway Grand Prix – 19th (11 pts)

=== Grand Prix wins ===
- 1: 2015 Speedway Grand Prix of Latvia
- 2: 2016 Speedway Grand Prix of Denmark
- 3: 2017 Speedway Grand Prix of Denmark
- 4: 2017 Speedway Grand Prix of Great Britain
- 5: 2018 Speedway Grand Prix of Sweden
- 6: 2019 Speedway Grand Prix of Germany
- 7: 2020 Speedway Grand Prix of Poland (Wrocław)
- 8: 2021 Speedway Grand Prix of Czech Republic

=== World team Championships ===
- 2013 Speedway World Cup – Champion
- 2015 Speedway World Cup – 3rd
- 2017 Speedway World Cup – Champion
- 2018 Speedway of Nations – 3rd
- 2021 Speedway of Nations – 2nd
- 2022 Speedway of Nations – 5th
- 2023 Speedway World Cup – Champion

=== World U-21 Championships ===
- 2008 Team Speedway Junior World Championship – Champion
- 2009 Individual Speedway Junior World Championship – 5th
- 2009 Team Speedway Junior World Championship – Champion
- 2010 Individual Speedway Junior World Championship – 2nd
- 2011 Individual Speedway Junior World Championship – Champion
- 2012 Individual Speedway Junior World Championship – Champion

=== European Championships ===
- Individual U-19 European Championship
  - 2008 – (Germany) Stralsund – Silver medal (12+3 pts)
  - 2009 – (Poland) Tarnów – Silver medal (13+3 pts)
- Team U-19 European Championship
  - 2008 – (Poland) Rawicz – 4th place (15 pts)
  - 2009 – (Denmark) Holsted – U-19 European Champion (15 pts)
  - 2010 – (Czech Republic) Divišov – U-19 European Champion (15 pts)
- European Club Champions' Cup
  - 2007 – (Hungary) Miskolc – Silver medal (6 pts) with Atlas Wrocław

=== Domestic competitions ===
- Individual Polish Championship
  - 2013 – (Poland) Tarnów – 3rd place (10 pts)
- Team Polish Championship (League)
  - 2007 – Bronze medal (CMA 1.71 – Atlas Wrocław)
  - 2008 – 5th-6th place (with Atlas Wrocław)
- Individual U-21 Polish Championship
  - 2008 – (Poland) Rybnik – Polish Champion (13+3 pts)
  - 2010 – (Poland) Toruń – Polish Champion (15 pts)
  - 2012 – (Poland) Bydgoszcz – Polish Champion (14 pts)
- Polish Pairs Speedway Junior Championship
  - 2009 – (Poland) Rybnik – Bronze medal for Taczanów (18 pts)
- Polish Pairs Speedway Championship
  - 2011 – (Poland) Zielona Góra – Polish Champion for WTS Wrocław
  - 2013 – (Poland) Gorzów Wielkopolski – Polish Champion for Unia Tarnów
- Polish Golden Helmet
  - 2013 – (Poland) Rawicz – Winner (13 pts)
- Polish Silver Helmet (U-21)
  - 2008 – (Poland) Rzeszów – Winner (12 pts)
  - 2009 – (Poland) Częstochowa – Runner-up (12+3 pts)
- Polish Bronze Helmet (U-19)
  - 2008 – (Poland) Gdańsk – 2nd place (12 pts)
  - 2009 – (Poland) Wrocław – Winner (15 pts)
  - 2010 – (Poland) Leszno – 2nd place (14 pts)

== See also ==
- Poland national speedway team
- List of Speedway Grand Prix riders
