= Matic Ivačič =

Slovenian speedway rider (born 1993)

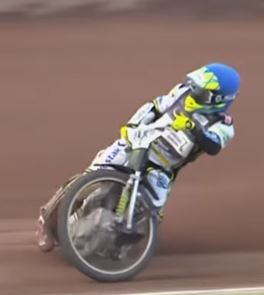
- Ivacic in 2019
- Born: 3 September 1993 (age 33); Brežice, Slovenia
- Nationality: Slovenian

Career history

Poland
- 2018-2020: Bydgoszcz
- 2021: Wölfe Wittstock
- 2021: Rawicz
- 2022: Piła
- 2023: Tarnów
- 2024: Rzeszów
- 2025: Kraków

Sweden
- 2021: Indianerna
- 2022–2023: Örnarna

Denmark
- 2021: Nordjysk

Great Britain
- 2024: Glasgow

Individual honours
- 2020, 2021, 2022, 2023: Slovenian champion

Matic Ivačič (born 8 September 1993) is a motorcycle speedway rider from Slovenia. He is a four-time national champion.

== Honours ==
In 2020, Ivačič became the Slovenian National Champion after winning the Slovenian Individual Speedway Championship, which ended the 18 year reign of Matej Žagar. Ivačič had previously won the silver medal behind Žagar in 2018 and 2019. In 2021, he became the Slovenia-Slovakia-Hungary National Champion and rode for Lendava.

Ivačič has won the Slovenian Championship again in 2021, 2022 and 2023.

In 2024, Ivačič made his debut in Britain, racing for Glasgow Tigers in the second tier SGB Championship.

== Career Details ==
=== National Championships ===
- Slovenian Individual Speedway Championship
  - 2020 - 1st Place
- Slovenia-Slovakia-Hungary National Championship
  - (Hungary) Debrecen 2021 - 1st Place

=== SGP Appearances ===
1. (Slovenia) Krsko (30 April 2016) - did not start (reserve)
2. (Slovenia) Krsko (7 September 2019) - 16th place (wild card)
3. (Slovenia) Krsko (1 June 2019) - 16th place (wild card)
