= Denis Štojs =

Slovenian motorcycle speedway rider (born 1978)

- Born: January 23, 1978 (age 48); Novo Mesto
- Nickname: Legenda
- Nationality: Slovenian

Career history
- 1999-2004, 2012-: AMD Krsko
- 2008: ST Lendawa
- 2009-: Speedway Miskolc

Individual honours
- 2004, 2008, 2016 2017, 2019: Slovenian national bronze

Denis Štojs (born 23 January 1978) is a Slovenian motorcycle speedway rider.

== Career ==
Štojs was a member of the Slovenia team at the 2002 and 2003 Speedway World Cups. He started in the 2003 Speedway Grand Prix of Slovenia and 2016 Speedway Grand Prix of Slovenia as a wild card.

Štojs medalled five times at the Slovenian Individual Speedway Championship, always winning the bronze.

Further world cup appearances ensued in 2005, 2006, 2007, 2008, 2009, and 2014.

== Honours ==
=== World championships ===
- Individual Speedway World Championship (Speedway Grand Prix)
  - 2003: 47th place (1 point in one event)
  - 2005: did not start as track reserve
- Team World Championship (Speedway World Team Cup and Speedway World Cup)
  - 2002: 11th place (1 point in Event 3)
  - 2003: 9th place (2 points in Event 2)
  - 2005: 2nd place in qualifying round 2
  - 2006: 2nd place in qualifying round 2
  - 2008: 3rd place in qualifying round 2

=== European championships ===
- European Pairs Championship
  - 2004 (Hungary) Debrecen: 6th place (5 points)
  - 2007: 4th place in semifinal 1
- European Club Champions' Cup
  - 2001: 4th place in Group A

== See also ==
- Slovenia national speedway team
- List of Speedway Grand Prix riders
