= Peter Kildemand =

Danish speedway rider

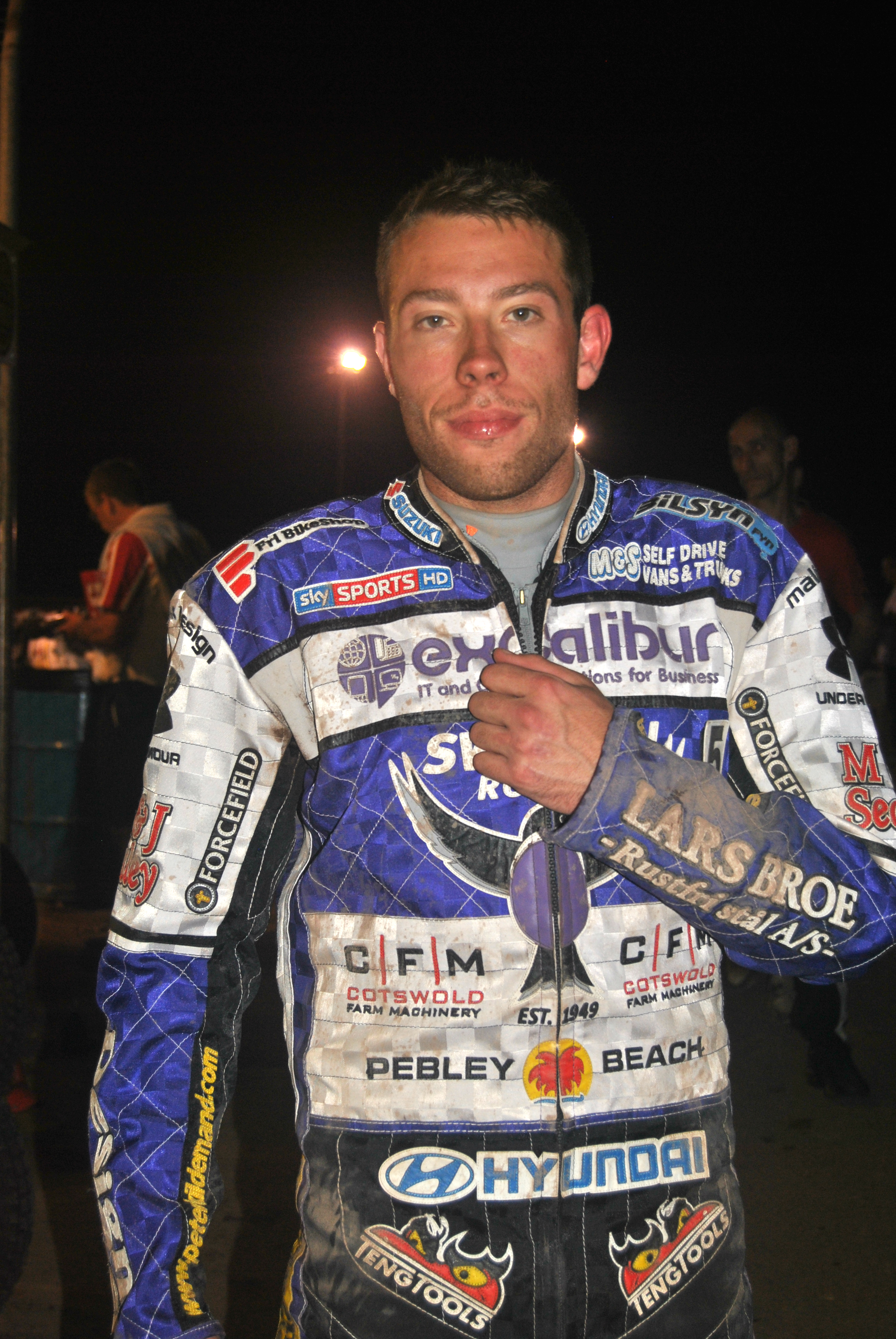
- Born: 1 September 1989 (age 37)
- Nationality: Danish

Career history

Denmark
- 2007–2025: Fjelsted

Sweden
- 2013–2014: Vargarna
- 2015: Lejonen
- 2016–2017: Piraterna
- 2018–2019: Västervik
- 2020–2021: Piraterna
- 2022: Smederna

Poland
- 2007–2008: Opole
- 2009: Piła
- 2012–2013: Łódź
- 2014: Częstochowa
- 2015, 2023–2024: Rzeszów
- 2016–2017: Leszno
- 2018: Tarnów
- 2019: Gorzów
- 2020: Gdańsk
- 2021–2022: Gniezno

Great Britain
- 2010–2011: Workington
- 2011–2015: Coventry
- 2012–2014: Swindon
- 2018: Poole
- 2022: King's Lynn
- 2025: Oxford
- 2025: Berwick

Individual honours
- 2015: Danish Grand Prix Champion
- 2016: Slovenian Grand Prix Champion

Team honours
- 2014: Speedway World Cup winner
- 2010: U-21 World Cup
- 2017: Ekstraliga champion
- 2012: British Elite League

Peter Kildemand (born 1 September 1989) is a motorcycle speedway rider from Denmark and was a member of the Danish national team. He is a two-time Speedway Grand Prix winner.

== Career ==
Kildemand started riding in Britain for Workington Comets in 2010 and 2011, before signing for Coventry Bees mid-way through the 2011 season. He was a member of the Swindon Robins 2012 Elite League Championship winning team and was named "Rider of the Year" for the club at the end of the season.

Kildemand was also part of the Fjelsted team that won the 2017 Danish Speedway League. He was captain of Västervik Speedway team in 2018.

In 2022, Kildemand signed for King's Lynn Stars but was unable to race for them after sustaining a pre season injury. However, he later helped Smederna win the Swedish Speedway Team Championship during the 2022 campaign.

In 2025, Kildemand made his return to British speedway, signing for Oxford Spires in the SGB Premiership and Berwick Bandits for the SGB Championship 2025.

== Results ==
=== World Championships ===
- Individual U-21 World Championship
  - 2009 – 17th place in Semi-final 2
- Team U-21 World Championship (Under-21 Speedway World Cup)
  - 2008 – (Denmark) Holsted – Runner-up (1 pt)
  - 2010 – (England) Rye House – Winner (8 pts)
- Speedway Grand Prix
  - 2015 – (Denmark) Horsens – 1st place
  - 2016 – (Slovenia) Krško – 1st place

=== European Championships ===
- 2008 Individual Speedway Junior European Championship
  - 2008 – (Germany) Stralsund – 16th place (1 pt)

=== Domestic competitions ===
- Team Polish Championship
  - 2007 – 4th place in 2007 Polish Speedway Second League (Average 0.500 in 2 heats) for Opole
  - 2008 – 5th place in 2008 Polish Speedway Second League (Average 1.143 in 7 heats) for Opole
  - 2009 – Second League for Piła

== Speedway Grand Prix results ==
Year	Position	Points	Best Finish	Notes
2012	28th	2		Reserve rider in Danish Grand Prix
2013	32nd	2		Reserve rider in Danish Grand Prix
2014	17th	33		Wildcard rider in Danish and Nordic Grand Prix
2015	9th	92	Winner	Won Danish Grand Prix
2016	12th	68	Winner	Won Slovenian Grand Prix
2017	13th	61		

== See also ==
- Denmark national speedway team
