= 2017 Speedway Grand Prix of Great Britain =

2017 racing event

(United Kingdom) 2017 Speedway Grand Prix of Great Britain
- 2017 Adrian Flux British FIM Speedway Grand Prix

Information
- Date: 22 July 2017
- City: (United Kingdom) Cardiff
- Event: 6 of 12
- Referee: (Germany) Christian Froschauer

Stadium details
- Stadium: Principality Stadium
- Capacity: 62,500
- Length: 272 m (297 yd)

SGP Results
- Best Time
- (gold) Winner: (Poland) Maciej Janowski
- (silver) Runner-up: (Australia) Jason Doyle
- (bronze) 3rd place: (Slovenia) Matej Žagar

The 2017 Adrian Flux British FIM Speedway Grand Prix was the sixth race of the 2017 Speedway Grand Prix season. It took place on 22 July at the Principality Stadium in Cardiff, Wales.

== Riders ==
First reserve Peter Kildemand replaced Nicki Pedersen, who was injured and not fit to race. The Speedway Grand Prix Commission also nominated Craig Cook as the wild card, and Adam Ellis and Josh Bates both as Track Reserves.

== Results ==
The Grand Prix was won by Poland's Maciej Janowski, who beat Jason Doyle and Matej Žagar in the final. It was the second successive win for Janowski, who moved to joint-second in the overall standings with compatriot Patryk Dudek - three points behind Doyle. Bartosz Zmarzlik had initially top scored in the heats with 13 points, but he was excluded in the final.

=== Heat details ===
Placing	Draw	Rider	Total	1	2	3	4	5	6	7	8	9	10	11	12	13	14	15	16	17	18	19	20	Pts	Pos	21	22	23
Gold	11	(Poland) (71) Maciej Janowski	17			3				3		1					3						1	11	3		3	3
Silver	15	(Australia) (69) Jason Doyle	13				1			0			2						3	3				9	6	2		2
Bronze	13	(Slovenia) (55) Matej Žagar	12				3	3							2		0					1		9	5		2	1
4	7	(Poland) (95) Bartosz Zmarzlik	16		3					2					3	3					2			13	1	3		0
5	16	(Russia) (89) Emil Sayfutdinov	11				0				2	3						3			3			11	2		0
6	3	(Denmark) (25) Peter Kildemand	10	1						1				3				2				3		10	4	0
7	8	(Poland) (692) Patryk Dudek	10		1						3			2			1			2				9	7	1
8	12	(Australia) (23) Chris Holder	10			1					1		3			2						2		9	8		1
9	1	(United Kingdom) (108) Tai Woffinden	9	3				2				2				1				1				9	9
10	2	(Sweden) (66) Fredrik Lindgren	7	2					3				0				2				0			7	10
11	14	(Denmark) (88) Niels Kristian Iversen	7				2		2					0		0							3	7	11
12	5	(Sweden) (85) Antonio Lindbäck	7		2			1					1					1					2	7	12
13	9	(Slovakia) (54) Martin Vaculík	4			0		0						1					2		1			4	13
14	10	(United Kingdom) (16) Craig Cook	2			0			1						1			0		0				2	14
15	6	(Poland) (777) Piotr Pawlicki Jr.	1		0				0			0							1			0		1	15
16	4	(United States) (45) Greg Hancock	0	0																				0	16
17	18	(United Kingdom) (18) Josh Bates	2																					2	17
18	17	(United Kingdom) (17) Adam Ellis	0																					0	18
Placing	Draw	Rider	Total	1	2	3	4	5	6	7	8	9	10	11	12	13	14	15	16	17	18	19	20	Pts	Pos	21	22	23

e: retired or mechanical failure • m: exclusion for exceeding two minute time allowance • t: exclusion for touching the tapes • x: other exclusion • f: fell
ns: non-starter • nc: non-classify
Semi-finals: Heat 21: Riders placed 1st, 4th, 6th & 7th in the intermediate classification (after 20 heats)
Heat 22: Riders placed 2nd, 3rd, 5th & 8th in the intermediate classification (after 20 heats)
Big Final (heat 23): The first and second placed riders in each of the Semi-Finals

gate A – inside	gate B	gate C	gate D – outside

== Intermediate classification ==
Qualifies for next season's Grand Prix series
Full-time Grand Prix rider
Wild card, track reserve or qualified reserve

Pos.	Rider	Points	SVN (Slovenia)	POL (Poland)	LAT (Latvia)	CZE (Czech Republic)	DEN (Denmark)	GBR (United Kingdom)	SWE (Sweden)	PL2 (Poland)	GER (Germany)	SCA (Sweden)	PL3 (Poland)	AUS (Australia)
Gold	(Australia) (69) Jason Doyle	78	12	15	10	13	15	13	–	–	–	–	–	–
Silver	(Poland) (71) Maciej Janowski	75	6	16	13	6	17	17	–	–	–	–	–	–
Bronze	(Poland) (692) Patryk Dudek	75	13	9	16	13	14	10	–	–	–	–	–	–
4	(Sweden) (66) Fredrik Lindgren	58	16	16	5	6	8	7	–	–	–	–	–	–
5	(Russia) (89) Emil Sayfutdinov	58	12	6	13	2	14	11	–	–	–	–	–	–
6	(United Kingdom) (108) Tai Woffinden	57	8	13	9	7	11	9	–	–	–	–	–	–
7	(Poland) (95) Bartosz Zmarzlik	55	6	12	6	8	7	16	–	–	–	–	–	–
8	(Slovakia) (54) Martin Vaculík	49	16	10	8	10	1	4	–	–	–	–	–	–
9	(Slovenia) (55) Matej Žagar	48	10	1	10	4	11	12	–	–	–	–	–	–
10	(United States) (45) Greg Hancock	45	11	4	5	18	7	0	–	–	–	–	–	–
11	(Poland) (777) Piotr Pawlicki Jr.	44	7	7	18	7	4	1	–	–	–	–	–	–
12	(Australia) (23) Chris Holder	44	6	6	4	11	7	10	–	–	–	–	–	–
13	(Denmark) (88) Niels Kristian Iversen	38	9	9	7	3	3	7	–	–	–	–	–	–
14	(Sweden) (85) Antonio Lindbäck	36	2	6	4	9	8	7	–	–	–	–	–	–
15	(Denmark) (25) Peter Kildemand	22	–	–	1	8	3	10	–	–	–	–	–	–
16	(Czech Republic) (16) Václav Milík Jr.	13	–	–	–	13	–	–	–	–	–	–	–	–
17	(Latvia) (16) Maksims Bogdanovs	8	–	–	8	–	–	–	–	–	–	–	–	–
18	(Denmark) (12) Nicki Pedersen	8	3	5	–	–	–	–	–	–	–	–	–	–
19	(Denmark) (16) Kenneth Bjerre	7	–	–	–	–	7	–	–	–	–	–	–	–
20	(Poland) (16) Przemysław Pawlicki	3	–	3	–	–	–	–	–	–	–	–	–	–
21	(United Kingdom) (16) Craig Cook	2	–	–	–	–	–	2	–	–	–	–	–	–
22	(United Kingdom) (18) Josh Bates	2	–	–	–	–	–	2	–	–	–	–	–	–
23	(Slovenia) (16) Nick Škorja	1	1	–	–	–	–	–	–	–	–	–	–	–
24	(Czech Republic) (17) Josef Franc	0	–	–	–	0	–	–	–	–	–	–	–	–
25	(Czech Republic) (18) Matěj Kůs	0	–	–	–	0	–	–	–	–	–	–	–	–
26	(United Kingdom) (17) Adam Ellis	0	–	–	–	–	–	0	–	–	–	–	–	–
Pos.	Rider	Points	SVN (Slovenia)	POL (Poland)	LAT (Latvia)	CZE (Czech Republic)	DEN (Denmark)	GBR (United Kingdom)	SWE (Sweden)	PL2 (Poland)	GER (Germany)	SCA (Sweden)	PL3 (Poland)	AUS (Australia)

== See also ==
- Motorcycle speedway
