= 2017 Speedway Grand Prix of Sweden =

- 2017 Teng Tools Swedish FIM Speedway Grand Prix

Information
- Date: 12 August 2017
- City: (Sweden) Målilla
- Event: 7 of 12
- Referee: (Poland) Artur Kusmierz

Stadium details
- Stadium: G&B Stadium
- Capacity: 15,000
- Length: 305 m (334 yd)

SGP Results
- Best Time
- (gold) Winner: (Poland) Bartosz Zmarzlik
- (silver) Runner-up: (Sweden) Antonio Lindbäck
- (bronze) 3rd place: (Sweden) Fredrik Lindgren

The 2017 Teng Tools Swedish FIM Speedway Grand Prix was the seventh race of the 2017 Speedway Grand Prix season. It took place on August 12 at the G&B Stadium in Målilla, Sweden.

== Riders ==
First reserve Peter Kildemand replaced Nicki Pedersen and second reserve Martin Smolinski replaced Greg Hancock. The Speedway Grand Prix Commission also nominated Linus Sundström as the wild card, and Kim Nilsson and Joel Kling both as Track Reserves.

== Results ==
The Grand Prix was won by Poland's Bartosz Zmarzlik, who beat Antonio Lindbäck, Fredrik Lindgren and Maciej Janowski in the final. Lindbäck and Lindgren had top scored during the qualifying heats and then won each of the semi-finals, however the former was passed by Zmarzlik on the final bend of the decider. Janowkski took the lead in the overall standings after finishing fourth, while title rivals Jason Doyle and Patryk Dudek both failed to make the semi-finals.

=== Heat details ===
Placing	Draw	Rider	Total	1	2	3	4	5	6	7	8	9	10	11	12	13	14	15	16	17	18	19	20	Pts	Pos	21	22	23
Gold	9	(Poland) (95) Bartosz Zmarzlik	15			3		1						2					1		3			10	5		2	3
Silver	1	(Sweden) (85) Antonio Lindbäck	19	3				3				2				3				3				14	1	3		2
Bronze	4	(Sweden) (66) Fredrik Lindgren	18	2							3				3				3				3	14	2		3	1
4	6	(Poland) (71) Maciej Janowski	13		0				3			3							2			3		11	4	2		0
5	8	(United Kingdom) (108) Tai Woffinden	14		3						2			3			3			2				13	3		1
6	12	(Russia) (89) Emil Sayfutdinov	10			2					1		3			2						1		9	7	1
7	13	(Slovakia) (54) Martin Vaculík	10				2	2							2		2					2		10	6	0
8	3	(Poland) (777) Piotr Pawlicki Jr.	6	0						3				1				2				0		6	8		0
9	15	(Denmark) (88) Niels Kristian Iversen	6				3			1			2						0	0				6	9
10	16	(Australia) (23) Chris Holder	6				1				0	1						3			1			6	10
11	7	(Poland) (692) Patryk Dudek	5		2					2					0	1					0			5	11
12	2	(Australia) (69) Jason Doyle	5	1					0				1				1				2			5	12
13	14	(Denmark) (25) Peter Kildemand	4				0		2					0		0							2	4	13
14	10	(Slovenia) (55) Matej Žagar	4			0			1						1			1		1				4	14
15	11	(Sweden) (16) Linus Sundström	2			1				0		0					0						1	2	15
16	5	(Germany) (84) Martin Smolinski	1		1			0					0					0					0	1	16
Placing	Draw	Rider	Total	1	2	3	4	5	6	7	8	9	10	11	12	13	14	15	16	17	18	19	20	Pts	Pos	21	22	23

e: retired or mechanical failure • m: exclusion for exceeding two minute time allowance • t: exclusion for touching the tapes • x: other exclusion • f: fell
ns: non-starter • nc: non-classify
Semi-finals: Heat 21: Riders placed 1st, 4th, 6th & 7th in the intermediate classification (after 20 heats)
Heat 22: Riders placed 2nd, 3rd, 5th & 8th in the intermediate classification (after 20 heats)
Big Final (heat 23): The first and second placed riders in each of the Semi-Finals

gate A – inside	gate B	gate C	gate D – outside

== Intermediate classification ==
Qualifies for next season's Grand Prix series
Full-time Grand Prix rider
Wild card, track reserve or qualified reserve

Pos.	Rider	Points	SVN (Slovenia)	POL (Poland)	LAT (Latvia)	CZE (Czech Republic)	DEN (Denmark)	GBR (United Kingdom)	SWE (Sweden)	PL2 (Poland)	GER (Germany)	SCA (Sweden)	PL3 (Poland)	AUS (Australia)
Gold	(Poland) (71) Maciej Janowski	88	6	16	13	6	17	17	13	–	–	–	–	–
Silver	(Australia) (69) Jason Doyle	83	12	15	10	13	15	13	5	–	–	–	–	–
Bronze	(Poland) (692) Patryk Dudek	80	13	9	16	13	14	10	5	–	–	–	–	–
4	(Sweden) (66) Fredrik Lindgren	76	16	16	5	6	8	7	18	–	–	–	–	–
5	(United Kingdom) (108) Tai Woffinden	71	8	13	9	7	11	9	14	–	–	–	–	–
6	(Poland) (95) Bartosz Zmarzlik	70	6	12	6	8	7	16	15	–	–	–	–	–
7	(Russia) (89) Emil Sayfutdinov	68	12	6	13	2	14	11	10	–	–	–	–	–
8	(Slovakia) (54) Martin Vaculík	59	16	10	8	10	1	4	10	–	–	–	–	–
9	(Sweden) (85) Antonio Lindbäck	55	2	6	4	9	8	7	19	–	–	–	–	–
10	(Slovenia) (55) Matej Žagar	51	10	1	10	4	11	12	3	–	–	–	–	–
11	(Australia) (23) Chris Holder	50	6	6	4	11	7	10	6	–	–	–	–	–
12	(Poland) (777) Piotr Pawlicki Jr.	50	7	7	18	7	4	1	6	–	–	–	–	–
13	(United States) (45) Greg Hancock	45	11	4	5	18	7	0	–	–	–	–	–	–
14	(Denmark) (88) Niels Kristian Iversen	44	9	9	7	3	3	7	6	–	–	–	–	–
15	(Denmark) (25) Peter Kildemand	26	–	–	1	8	3	10	4	–	–	–	–	–
16	(Czech Republic) (16) Václav Milík Jr.	13	–	–	–	13	–	–	–	–	–	–	–	–
17	(Latvia) (16) Maksims Bogdanovs	8	–	–	8	–	–	–	–	–	–	–	–	–
18	(Denmark) (12) Nicki Pedersen	8	3	5	–	–	–	–	–	–	–	–	–	–
19	(Denmark) (16) Kenneth Bjerre	7	–	–	–	–	7	–	–	–	–	–	–	–
20	(Poland) (16) Przemysław Pawlicki	3	–	3	–	–	–	–	–	–	–	–	–	–
21	(United Kingdom) (16) Craig Cook	2	–	–	–	–	–	2	–	–	–	–	–	–
22	(United Kingdom) (18) Josh Bates	2	–	–	–	–	–	2	–	–	–	–	–	–
23	(Sweden) (16) Linus Sundström	2	–	–	–	–	–	–	2	–	–	–	–	–
24	(Slovenia) (16) Nick Škorja	1	1	–	–	–	–	–	–	–	–	–	–	–
25	(Germany) (84) Martin Smolinski	1	–	–	–	–	–	–	1	–	–	–	–	–
26	(Czech Republic) (17) Josef Franc	0	–	–	–	0	–	–	–	–	–	–	–	–
27	(Czech Republic) (18) Matěj Kůs	0	–	–	–	0	–	–	–	–	–	–	–	–
28	(United Kingdom) (17) Adam Ellis	0	–	–	–	–	–	0	–	–	–	–	–	–
Pos.	Rider	Points	SVN (Slovenia)	POL (Poland)	LAT (Latvia)	CZE (Czech Republic)	DEN (Denmark)	GBR (United Kingdom)	SWE (Sweden)	PL2 (Poland)	GER (Germany)	SCA (Sweden)	PL3 (Poland)	AUS (Australia)

== See also ==
- Motorcycle speedway
