= 2017 Speedway Grand Prix of Scandinavia =

2017 Speedway Grand Prix of Sweden
- 2017 Stockholm FIM Speedway Grand Prix

Information
- Date: 22 September 2017
- City: (Sweden) Stockholm
- Event: 10 of 12
- Referee: (Denmark) Jesper Steentoft

Stadium details
- Stadium: Friends Arena
- Capacity: 34,000
- Length: 272 m (297 yd)

SGP Results
- Best Time
- (gold) Winner: (Slovenia) Matej Žagar
- (silver) Runner-up: (Poland) Bartosz Zmarzlik
- (bronze) 3rd place: (Australia) Bartosz Zmarzlik

The 2017 Stockholm FIM Speedway Grand Prix was the tenth race of the 2017 Speedway Grand Prix season. It took place on September 22 at the Friends Arena in Stockholm, Sweden.

== Riders ==
First reserve Peter Kildemand replaced Greg Hancock, second reserve Martin Smolinski replaced Nicki Pedersen and third reserve Max Fricke replaced Niels-Kristian Iversen. The Speedway Grand Prix Commission also nominated Kim Nilsson as the wild card, and Jacob Thorssell and Filip Hjelmland both as Track Reserves.

== Results ==
The Grand Prix was won by Slovenia's Matej Žagar, who beat Bartosz Zmarzlik, Jason Doyle and Peter Kildemand in the final. It was Zagar's second successive Grand Prix win after finishing first in Germany the round before. Doyle, who equalled the record number of final appearances in one season with nine, initially top scored in the qualifying heats, however third place saw him move 22 points clear of Patryk Dudek, who failed to make the semi-finals.

=== Heat details ===
Placing	Draw	Rider	Total	1	2	3	4	5	6	7	8	9	10	11	12	13	14	15	16	17	18	19	20	Pts	Pos	21	22	23
Gold	16	(Slovenia) (55) Matej Žagar	13				1				2	1						3			0			7	8		3	3
Silver	15	(Poland) (95) Bartosz Zmarzlik	12				2			2			1						3	0				8	4	2		2
Bronze	11	(Australia) (69) Jason Doyle	18			3				3		2					3						3	14	1	3		1
4	14	(Denmark) (25) Peter Kildemand	10				0		2					3		1							2	8	5		2	0
5	2	(Russia) (89) Emil Sayfutdinov	12	3					3				3				2				1			12	2		0
6	12	(Australia) (23) Chris Holder	9			1					0		2			3						3		9	3		0
7	4	(Sweden) (66) Fredrik Lindgren	9	2							3				1				2				0	8	7	1
8	13	(Sweden) (85) Antonio Lindbäck	8				3	2							0		1					2		8	6	0
9	5	(Poland) (71) Maciej Janowski	7		3			1					0					2					1	7	9
10	1	(Poland) (692) Patryk Dudek	6	1				3				0				0				2				6	10
11	9	(Poland) (777) Piotr Pawlicki Jr.	6			0		0						2					1		3			6	11
12	6	(Australia) (46) Max Fricke	6		2				1			3							0			0		6	12
13	7	(United Kingdom) (108) Tai Woffinden	6		0					0					2	2					2			6	13
14	8	(Slovakia) (54) Martin Vaculík	5		0						1			1			0			3				5	14
15	17	(Sweden) (17) Jacob Thorssell	4																					4	15
16	10	(Germany) (84) Martin Smolinski	4			2			0						0			1		1				4	16
17	3	(Sweden) (16) Kim Nilsson	2	0						1				0				0				1		2	17
18	18	(Sweden) (18) Filip Hjelmland	0																					0	18
Placing	Draw	Rider	Total	1	2	3	4	5	6	7	8	9	10	11	12	13	14	15	16	17	18	19	20	Pts	Pos	21	22	23

e: retired or mechanical failure • m: exclusion for exceeding two minute time allowance • t: exclusion for touching the tapes • x: other exclusion • f: fell
ns: non-starter • nc: non-classify
Semi-finals: Heat 21: Riders placed 1st, 4th, 6th & 7th in the intermediate classification (after 20 heats)
Heat 22: Riders placed 2nd, 3rd, 5th & 8th in the intermediate classification (after 20 heats)
Big Final (heat 23): The first and second placed riders in each of the Semi-Finals

gate A – inside	gate B	gate C	gate D – outside

== Intermediate classification ==
Qualifies for next season's Grand Prix series
Full-time Grand Prix rider
Wild card, track reserve or qualified reserve

Pos.	Rider	Points	SVN (Slovenia)	POL (Poland)	LAT (Latvia)	CZE (Czech Republic)	DEN (Denmark)	GBR (United Kingdom)	SWE (Sweden)	PL2 (Poland)	GER (Germany)	SCA (Sweden)	PL3 (Poland)	AUS (Australia)
Gold	(Australia) (69) Jason Doyle	132	12	15	10	13	15	13	5	14	17	18	–	–
Silver	(Poland) (692) Patryk Dudek	110	13	9	16	13	14	10	5	13	11	6	–	–
Bronze	(Poland) (71) Maciej Janowski	108	6	16	13	6	17	17	13	6	7	7	–	–
4	(Sweden) (66) Fredrik Lindgren	107	16	16	5	6	8	7	18	11	11	9	–	–
5	(Russia) (89) Emil Sayfutdinov	102	12	6	13	2	14	11	10	11	11	12	–	–
6	(United Kingdom) (108) Tai Woffinden	100	8	13	9	7	11	9	14	18	5	6	–	–
7	(Poland) (95) Bartosz Zmarzlik	94	6	12	6	8	7	16	15	10	2	12	–	–
8	(Slovenia) (55) Matej Žagar	86	10	1	10	4	11	12	3	7	15	13	–	–
9	(Slovakia) (54) Martin Vaculík	85	16	10	8	10	1	4	10	7	14	5	–	–
10	(Australia) (23) Chris Holder	75	6	6	4	11	7	10	6	2	14	9	–	–
11	(Sweden) (85) Antonio Lindbäck	72	2	6	4	9	8	7	19	5	4	8	–	–
12	(Poland) (777) Piotr Pawlicki Jr.	69	7	7	18	7	4	1	6	9	4	6	–	–
13	(Denmark) (25) Peter Kildemand	47	–	–	1	8	3	10	4	–	10	11	–	–
14	(United States) (45) Greg Hancock	45	11	4	5	18	7	0	–	–	–	–	–	–
15	(Denmark) (88) Niels Kristian Iversen	44	9	9	7	3	3	7	6	–	–	–	–	–
16	(Czech Republic) (225) Václav Milík Jr.	20	–	–	–	13	–	–	–	7	–	–	–	–
17	(Germany) (84) Martin Smolinski	17	–	–	–	–	–	–	1	4	8	4	–	–
18	(Latvia) (16) Maksims Bogdanovs	8	–	–	8	–	–	–	–	–	–	–	–	–
19	(Denmark) (52) Michael Jepsen Jensen	8	–	–	–	–	–	–	–	8	–	–	–	–
20	(Denmark) (12) Nicki Pedersen	8	3	5	–	–	–	–	–	–	–	–	–	–
21	(Denmark) (16) Kenneth Bjerre	7	–	–	–	–	7	–	–	–	–	–	–	–
22	(Australia) (46) Max Fricke	7	–	–	–	–	–	–	–	–	1	6	–	–
23	(Poland) (16) Krzysztof Kasprzak	6	–	–	–	–	–	–	–	6	–	–	–	–
24	(Germany) (16) Kai Huckenbeck	4	–	–	–	–	–	–	–	–	4	–	–	–
25	(Sweden) (17) Jacob Thorssell	4	–	–	–	–	–	–	–	–	–	4	–	–
26	(Poland) (16) Przemysław Pawlicki	3	–	3	–	–	–	–	–	–	–	–	–	–
27	(United Kingdom) (16) Craig Cook	2	–	–	–	–	–	2	–	–	–	–	–	–
28	(United Kingdom) (18) Josh Bates	2	–	–	–	–	–	2	–	–	–	–	–	–
29	(Sweden) (16) Linus Sundström	2	–	–	–	–	–	–	2	–	–	–	–	–
30	(Sweden) (16) Kim Nilsson	2	–	–	–	–	–	–	–	–	–	2	–	–
31	(Slovenia) (16) Nick Škorja	1	1	–	–	–	–	–	–	–	–	–	–	–
32	(Czech Republic) (17) Josef Franc	0	–	–	–	0	–	–	–	–	–	–	–	–
33	(Czech Republic) (18) Matěj Kůs	0	–	–	–	0	–	–	–	–	–	–	–	–
34	(United Kingdom) (17) Adam Ellis	0	–	–	–	–	–	0	–	–	–	–	–	–
35	(Germany) (17) Tobias Kroner	0	–	–	–	–	–	–	–	–	0	–	–	–
36	(Sweden) (18) Filip Hjelmland	0	–	–	–	–	–	–	–	–	–	0	–	–
Pos.	Rider	Points	SVN (Slovenia)	POL (Poland)	LAT (Latvia)	CZE (Czech Republic)	DEN (Denmark)	GBR (United Kingdom)	SWE (Sweden)	PL2 (Poland)	GER (Germany)	SCA (Sweden)	PL3 (Poland)	AUS (Australia)

== See also ==
- Motorcycle speedway
