= 2017 Speedway Grand Prix of Australia =

- 2017 QBE Insurance Australian FIM Speedway Grand Prix

Information
- Date: 28 October 2017
- City: (Australia) Melbourne
- Event: 12 of 12
- Referee: (United Kingdom) Craig Ackroyd

Stadium details
- Stadium: Etihad Stadium
- Capacity: 42,000
- Length: 346 m (378 yd)

SGP Results
- Best Time
- (gold) Winner: (Australia) Jason Doyle
- (silver) Runner-up: (United Kingdom) Tai Woffinden
- (bronze) 3rd place: (Poland) Bartosz Zmarzlik

The 2017 QBE Insurance Australian FIM Speedway Grand Prix was the 12th and final race meeting of the 2017 Speedway Grand Prix season. It took place on 28 October at the Etihad Stadium in Melbourne, Australia.

== Riders ==
First reserve Peter Kildemand replaced Greg Hancock, second reserve Martin Smolinski replaced Nicki Pedersen, first track reserve Justin Sedgmen replaced Niels-Kristian Iversen and second track reserve Davey Watt replaced Fredrik Lindgren. The Speedway Grand Prix Commission also nominated Sam Masters as the wild card, and Brady Kurtz and Rohan Tungate as third and fourth track Reserves.

== Results ==
The Grand Prix was won by Australia's Jason Doyle, who beat Tai Woffinden, Bartosz Zmarzlik and Patryk Dudek in the final. It was second Grand Prix win of the season for Doyle, and the sixth of his career. He also wrapped up the world title in the 10th heat of the night, becoming the first Australian to win the world title on home soil. He also set the record for the most final appearances in one season with 10.

=== Heat details ===
| Placing | Draw | Rider | Total | 1 | 2 | 3 | 4 | 5 | 6 | 7 | 8 | 9 | 10 | 11 | 12 | 13 | 14 | 15 | 16 | 17 | 18 | 19 | 20 | Pts | Pos | 21 | 22 | 23 |
|---|---|---|---|---|---|---|---|---|---|---|---|---|---|---|---|---|---|---|---|---|---|---|---|---|---|---|---|---|
| Gold | 15 | (Australia) (69) Jason Doyle | 19 | | | | 3 | | | 3 | | | 3 | | | | | | 2 | 3 | | | | 14 | 1 | 2 | | 3 |
| Silver | 5 | (United Kingdom) (108) Tai Woffinden | 16 | | 3 | | | 2 | | | | | 1 | | | | | 3 | | | | | 3 | 12 | 3 | | 2 | 2 |
| Bronze | 6 | (Poland) (95) Bartosz Zmarzlik | 13 | | 2 | | | | 1 | | | 1 | | | | | | | 3 | | | 2 | | 9 | 6 | 3 | | 1 |
| 4 | 9 | (Poland) (692) Patryk Dudek | 15 | | | 2 | | 3 | | | | | | 3 | | | | | 1 | | 3 | | | 12 | 2 | | 3 | 0 |
| 5 | 8 | (Slovenia) (55) Matej Žagar | 10 | | 1 | | | | | | 3 | | | 1 | | | 3 | | | 2 | | | | 10 | 4 | 0 |
| 6 | 14 | (Slovakia) (54) Martin Vaculík | 9 | | | | 2 | | 3 | | | | | 2 | | 0 | | | | | | | 2 | 9 | 5 | | 0 |
| 7 | 1 | (Poland) (71) Maciej Janowski | 9 | 2 | | | | 0 | | | | 3 | | | | 2 | | | | 1 | | | | 8 | 7 | 1 |
| 8 | 11 | (Russia) (89) Emil Sayfutdinov | 8 | | | 3 | | | | 2 | | 0 | | | | | 2 | | | | | | 0 | 7 | 8 | | 1 |
| 9 | 18 | (Australia) (20) Rohan Tungate | 6 | | | | | | | | | | | | | | | | | | | | | 6 | 9 |
| 10 | 13 | (Germany) (84) Martin Smolinski | 6 | | | | 0 | 1 | | | | | | | 3 | | 1 | | | | | 1 | | 6 | 10 |
| 11 | 16 | (Denmark) (25) Peter Kildemand | 6 | | | | 1 | | | | 2 | 2 | | | | | | 1 | | | 0 | | | 6 | 11 |
| 12 | 4 | (Sweden) (85) Antonio Lindbäck | 4 | 0 | | | | | | | 1 | | | | 2 | | | | 0 | | | | 1 | 4 | 12 |
| 13 | 10 | (Australia) (17) Justin Segdmen | 4 | | | 1 | | | 2 | | | | | | 1 | | | 0 | | 0 | | | | 4 | 13 |
| 14 | 17 | (Australia) (19) Brady Kurtz | 3 | | | | | | | | | | | | | | | | | | | | | 3 | 14 |
| 15 | 3 | (Australia) (23) Chris Holder | 3 | 1 | | | | | | 0 | | | | 0 | | | | 2 | | | | 0 | | 3 | 15 |
| 16 | 7 | (Australia) (18) Davey Watt | 3 | | 0 | | | | | 1 | | | | | 0 | 1 | | | | | 1 | | | 3 | 16 |
| 17 | 12 | (Poland) (777) Piotr Pawlicki Jr. | 2 | | | 0 | | | | | 0 | | 2 | | | | | | | | | | | 2 | 17 |
| 18 | 2 | (Australia) (16) Sam Masters | 2 | | | | | | 0 | | | | 0 | | | | 0 | | | | 2 | | | 2 | 18 |
| Placing | Draw | Rider | Total | 1 | 2 | 3 | 4 | 5 | 6 | 7 | 8 | 9 | 10 | 11 | 12 | 13 | 14 | 15 | 16 | 17 | 18 | 19 | 20 | Pts | Pos | 21 | 22 | 23 |

e: retired or mechanical failure • m: exclusion for exceeding two minute time allowance • t: exclusion for touching the tapes • x: other exclusion • f: fell
ns: non-starter • nc: non-classify
Semi-finals: Heat 21: Riders placed 1st, 4th, 6th & 7th in the intermediate classification (after 20 heats)
Heat 22: Riders placed 2nd, 3rd, 5th & 8th in the intermediate classification (after 20 heats)
Big Final (heat 23): The first and second placed riders in each of the Semi-Finals

| gate A – inside | gate B | gate C | gate D – outside |

== Final classification ==
Qualifies for next season's Grand Prix series
Full-time Grand Prix rider
Wild card, track reserve or qualified reserve

| Pos. | Rider | Points | SVN (Slovenia) | POL (Poland) | LAT (Latvia) | CZE (Czech Republic) | DEN (Denmark) | GBR (United Kingdom) | SWE (Sweden) | PL2 (Poland) | GER (Germany) | SCA (Sweden) | PL3 (Poland) | AUS (Australia) |
| Gold | (Australia) (69) Jason Doyle | 161 | 12 | 15 | 10 | 13 | 15 | 13 | 5 | 14 | 17 | 18 | 10 | 19 |
| Silver | (Poland) (692) Patryk Dudek | 143 | 13 | 9 | 16 | 13 | 14 | 10 | 5 | 13 | 11 | 6 | 18 | 15 |
| Bronze | (United Kingdom) (108) Tai Woffinden | 131 | 8 | 13 | 9 | 7 | 11 | 9 | 14 | 18 | 5 | 6 | 15 | 16 |
| 4 | (Poland) (71) Maciej Janowski | 122 | 6 | 16 | 13 | 6 | 17 | 17 | 13 | 6 | 7 | 7 | 5 | 9 |
| 5 | (Poland) (95) Bartosz Zmarzlik | 121 | 6 | 12 | 6 | 8 | 7 | 16 | 15 | 10 | 2 | 12 | 14 | 13 |
| 6 | (Russia) (89) Emil Sayfutdinov | 117 | 12 | 6 | 13 | 2 | 14 | 11 | 10 | 11 | 11 | 12 | 7 | 8 |
| 7 | (Slovenia) (55) Matej Žagar | 107 | 10 | 1 | 10 | 4 | 11 | 12 | 3 | 7 | 15 | 13 | 11 | 10 |
| 8 | (Sweden) (66) Fredrik Lindgren | 107 | 16 | 16 | 5 | 6 | 8 | 7 | 18 | 11 | 11 | 9 | – | – |
| 9 | (Slovakia) (54) Martin Vaculík | 99 | 16 | 10 | 8 | 10 | 1 | 4 | 10 | 7 | 14 | 5 | 5 | 9 |
| 10 | (Australia) (23) Chris Holder | 85 | 6 | 6 | 4 | 11 | 7 | 10 | 6 | 2 | 14 | 9 | 7 | 3 |
| 11 | (Poland) (777) Piotr Pawlicki Jr. | 81 | 7 | 7 | 18 | 7 | 4 | 1 | 6 | 9 | 4 | 6 | 10 | 2 |
| 12 | (Sweden) (85) Antonio Lindbäck | 77 | 2 | 6 | 4 | 9 | 8 | 7 | 19 | 5 | 4 | 8 | 1 | 4 |
| 13 | (Denmark) (25) Peter Kildemand | 61 | – | – | 1 | 8 | 3 | 10 | 4 | – | 10 | 11 | 8 | 6 |
| 14 | (United States) (45) Greg Hancock | 45 | 11 | 4 | 5 | 18 | 7 | 0 | – | – | – | – | – | – |
| 15 | (Denmark) (88) Niels Kristian Iversen | 44 | 9 | 9 | 7 | 3 | 3 | 7 | 6 | – | – | – | – | – |
| 16 | (Czech Republic) (225) Václav Milík Jr. | 31 | – | – | – | 13 | – | – | – | 7 | – | – | 11 | – |
| 17 | (Germany) (84) Martin Smolinski | 25 | – | – | – | – | – | – | 1 | 4 | 8 | 4 | 2 | 6 |
| 18 | (Australia) (46) Max Fricke | 11 | – | – | – | – | – | – | – | – | 1 | 6 | 4 | – |
| 19 | (Poland) (16) Paweł Przedpełski | 10 | – | – | – | – | – | – | – | – | – | – | 10 | – |
| 20 | (Latvia) (16) Maksims Bogdanovs | 8 | – | – | 8 | – | – | – | – | – | – | – | – | – |
| 20 | (Denmark) (52) Michael Jepsen Jensen | 8 | – | – | – | – | – | – | – | 8 | – | – | – | – |
| 20 | (Denmark) (12) Nicki Pedersen | 8 | 3 | 5 | – | – | – | – | – | – | – | – | – | – |
| 23 | (Denmark) (16) Kenneth Bjerre | 7 | – | – | – | – | 7 | – | – | – | – | – | – | – |
| 24 | (Poland) (16) Krzysztof Kasprzak | 6 | – | – | – | – | – | – | – | 6 | – | – | – | – |
| 24 | (Australia) (20) Rohan Tungate | 6 | – | – | – | – | – | – | – | – | – | – | – | 6 |
| 26 | (Germany) (16) Kai Huckenbeck | 4 | – | – | – | – | – | – | – | – | 4 | – | – | – |
| 26 | (Sweden) (17) Jacob Thorssell | 4 | – | – | – | – | – | – | – | – | – | 4 | – | – |
| 26 | (Australia) (17) Justin Sedgmen | 4 | – | – | – | – | – | – | – | – | – | – | – | 4 |
| 29 | (Poland) (16) Przemysław Pawlicki | 3 | – | 3 | – | – | – | – | – | – | – | – | – | – |
| 29 | (Australia) (19) Brady Kurtz | 3 | – | – | – | – | – | – | – | – | – | – | – | 3 |
| 29 | (Australia) (18) Davey Watt | 3 | – | – | – | – | – | – | – | – | – | – | – | 3 |
| 32 | (United Kingdom) (16) Craig Cook | 2 | – | – | – | – | – | 2 | – | – | – | – | – | – |
| 32 | (United Kingdom) (18) Josh Bates | 2 | – | – | – | – | – | 2 | – | – | – | – | – | – |
| 32 | (Sweden) (16) Linus Sundström | 2 | – | – | – | – | – | – | 2 | – | – | – | – | – |
| 32 | (Sweden) (16) Kim Nilsson | 2 | – | – | – | – | – | – | – | – | – | 2 | – | – |
| 32 | (Australia) (16) Sam Masters | 2 | – | – | – | – | – | – | – | – | – | – | – | 2 |
| 37 | (Slovenia) (16) Nick Škorja | 1 | 1 | – | – | – | – | – | – | – | – | – | – | – |
| 38 | (Czech Republic) (17) Josef Franc | 0 | – | – | – | 0 | – | – | – | – | – | – | – | – |
| 38 | (Czech Republic) (18) Matěj Kůs | 0 | – | – | – | 0 | – | – | – | – | – | – | – | – |
| 38 | (United Kingdom) (17) Adam Ellis | 0 | – | – | – | – | – | 0 | – | – | – | – | – | – |
| 38 | (Germany) (17) Tobias Kroner | 0 | – | – | – | – | – | – | – | – | 0 | – | – | – |
| 38 | (Sweden) (18) Filip Hjelmland | 0 | – | – | – | – | – | – | – | – | – | 0 | – | – |
| 38 | (Poland) (17) Bartosz Smektała | 0 | – | – | – | – | – | – | – | – | – | – | 0 | – |
| Pos. | Rider | Points | SVN (Slovenia) | POL (Poland) | LAT (Latvia) | CZE (Czech Republic) | DEN (Denmark) | GBR (United Kingdom) | SWE (Sweden) | PL2 (Poland) | GER (Germany) | SCA (Sweden) | PL3 (Poland) | AUS (Australia) |

== See also ==
- Motorcycle speedway
