= 2017 Speedway Grand Prix of Poland II =

2017 Speedway Grand Prix of Poland
- 2017 MIB Nordic Gorzów FIM Speedway Grand Prix of Poland

Information
- Date: 26 August 2017
- City: (Poland) Gorzów
- Event: 8 of 12
- Referee: (Sweden) Krister Gardell

Stadium details
- Stadium: Edward Jancarz Stadium
- Capacity: 17,000
- Length: 329 m (360 yd)

SGP Results
- Best Time
- (gold) Winner: (United Kingdom) Tai Woffinden
- (silver) Runner-up: (Poland) Patryk Dudek
- (bronze) 3rd place: (Australia) Jason Doyle

The 2017 MIB Nordic Gorzów FIM Speedway Grand Prix of Poland was the eighth race of the 2017 Speedway Grand Prix season. It took place on August 26 at the Edward Jancarz Stadium in Gorzów, Poland.

== Riders ==
Second reserve Martin Smolinski replaced Greg Hancock, fourth reserve Václav Milík Jr. replaced Nicki Pedersen and fifth reserve Michael Jepsen Jensen replaced Niels-Kristian Iversen. The Speedway Grand Prix Commission also nominated Krzysztof Kasprzak as the wild card, and Kacper Woryna and Oskar Polis both as Track Reserves.

== Results ==
The Grand Prix was won by Great Britain's Tai Woffinden, who beat Patryk Dudek, Jason Doyle and Bartosz Zmarzlik in the final. As a result of finishing third, Doyle moved back to the top of the overall standings. Previous series leader Maciej Janowski failed to make the semi-finals.

=== Heat details ===
Placing	Draw	Rider	Total	1	2	3	4	5	6	7	8	9	10	11	12	13	14	15	16	17	18	19	20	Pts	Pos	21	22	23
Gold	12	(United Kingdom) (108) Tai Woffinden	18			3					2		2			3						3		13	1	2		3
Silver	3	(Poland) (692) Patryk Dudek	13	0						3				1				2				2		8	6	3		2
Bronze	6	(Australia) (69) Jason Doyle	14		1				3			2							3			1		10	3		3	1
4	7	(Poland) (95) Bartosz Zmarzlik	10		3					1					1	2					1			8	8		2	0
5	8	(Russia) (89) Emil Sayfutdinov	11		2						3			3			0			3				11	2		0
6	2	(Sweden) (66) Fredrik Lindgren	11	1					1				3				2				3			10	4	1
7	5	(Poland) (777) Piotr Pawlicki Jr.	9		0			3					1					1					3	8	5		1
8	4	(Denmark) (52) Michael Jepsen Jensen	8	3							1				2				0				2	8	7	0
9	10	(Slovenia) (55) Matej Žagar	7			1			0						3			3		0				7	9
10	11	(Czech Republic) (225) Václav Milík Jr.	7			2				0		3					1						1	7	10
11	15	(Slovakia) (54) Martin Vaculík	7				2			2			0						2	1				7	11
12	13	(Poland) (16) Krzysztof Kasprzak	6				3	0							0		3					0		6	12
13	1	(Poland) (71) Maciej Janowski	6	2				2				0				0				2				6	13
14	14	(Sweden) (85) Antonio Lindbäck	5				0		2					2		1							0	5	14
15	16	(Germany) (84) Martin Smolinski	4				1				0	1						0			2			4	15
16	9	(Australia) (23) Chris Holder	2			0		1						0					1		0			2	16
Placing	Draw	Rider	Total	1	2	3	4	5	6	7	8	9	10	11	12	13	14	15	16	17	18	19	20	Pts	Pos	21	22	23

e: retired or mechanical failure • m: exclusion for exceeding two minute time allowance • t: exclusion for touching the tapes • x: other exclusion • f: fell
ns: non-starter • nc: non-classify
Semi-finals: Heat 21: Riders placed 1st, 4th, 6th & 7th in the intermediate classification (after 20 heats)
Heat 22: Riders placed 2nd, 3rd, 5th & 8th in the intermediate classification (after 20 heats)
Big Final (heat 23): The first and second placed riders in each of the Semi-Finals

gate A – inside	gate B	gate C	gate D – outside

== Intermediate classification ==
Qualifies for next season's Grand Prix series
Full-time Grand Prix rider
Wild card, track reserve or qualified reserve

Pos.	Rider	Points	SVN (Slovenia)	POL (Poland)	LAT (Latvia)	CZE (Czech Republic)	DEN (Denmark)	GBR (United Kingdom)	SWE (Sweden)	PL2 (Poland)	GER (Germany)	SCA (Sweden)	PL3 (Poland)	AUS (Australia)
Gold	(Australia) (69) Jason Doyle	97	12	15	10	13	15	13	5	14	–	–	–	–
Silver	(Poland) (71) Maciej Janowski	94	6	16	13	6	17	17	13	6	–	–	–	–
Bronze	(Poland) (692) Patryk Dudek	93	13	9	16	13	14	10	5	13	–	–	–	–
4	(United Kingdom) (108) Tai Woffinden	89	8	13	9	7	11	9	14	18	–	–	–	–
5	(Sweden) (66) Fredrik Lindgren	87	16	16	5	6	8	7	18	11	–	–	–	–
6	(Poland) (95) Bartosz Zmarzlik	80	6	12	6	8	7	16	15	10	–	–	–	–
7	(Russia) (89) Emil Sayfutdinov	79	12	6	13	2	14	11	10	11	–	–	–	–
8	(Slovakia) (54) Martin Vaculík	66	16	10	8	10	1	4	10	7	–	–	–	–
9	(Sweden) (85) Antonio Lindbäck	60	2	6	4	9	8	7	19	5	–	–	–	–
10	(Poland) (777) Piotr Pawlicki Jr.	59	7	7	18	7	4	1	6	9	–	–	–	–
11	(Slovenia) (55) Matej Žagar	58	10	1	10	4	11	12	3	7	–	–	–	–
12	(Australia) (23) Chris Holder	52	6	6	4	11	7	10	6	2	–	–	–	–
13	(United States) (45) Greg Hancock	45	11	4	5	18	7	0	–	–	–	–	–	–
14	(Denmark) (88) Niels Kristian Iversen	44	9	9	7	3	3	7	6	–	–	–	–	–
15	(Denmark) (25) Peter Kildemand	26	–	–	1	8	3	10	4	–	–	–	–	–
16	(Czech Republic) (225) Václav Milík Jr.	20	–	–	–	13	–	–	–	7	–	–	–	–
17	(Latvia) (16) Maksims Bogdanovs	8	–	–	8	–	–	–	–	–	–	–	–	–
18	(Denmark) (52) Michael Jepsen Jensen	8	–	–	–	–	–	–	–	8	–	–	–	–
19	(Denmark) (12) Nicki Pedersen	8	3	5	–	–	–	–	–	–	–	–	–	–
20	(Denmark) (16) Kenneth Bjerre	7	–	–	–	–	7	–	–	–	–	–	–	–
21	(Poland) (16) Krzysztof Kasprzak	6	–	–	–	–	–	–	–	6	–	–	–	–
22	(Germany) (84) Martin Smolinski	5	–	–	–	–	–	–	1	4	–	–	–	–
23	(Poland) (16) Przemysław Pawlicki	3	–	3	–	–	–	–	–	–	–	–	–	–
24	(United Kingdom) (16) Craig Cook	2	–	–	–	–	–	2	–	–	–	–	–	–
25	(United Kingdom) (18) Josh Bates	2	–	–	–	–	–	2	–	–	–	–	–	–
26	(Sweden) (16) Linus Sundström	2	–	–	–	–	–	–	2	–	–	–	–	–
27	(Slovenia) (16) Nick Škorja	1	1	–	–	–	–	–	–	–	–	–	–	–
28	(Czech Republic) (17) Josef Franc	0	–	–	–	0	–	–	–	–	–	–	–	–
29	(Czech Republic) (18) Matěj Kůs	0	–	–	–	0	–	–	–	–	–	–	–	–
30	(United Kingdom) (17) Adam Ellis	0	–	–	–	–	–	0	–	–	–	–	–	–
Pos.	Rider	Points	SVN (Slovenia)	POL (Poland)	LAT (Latvia)	CZE (Czech Republic)	DEN (Denmark)	GBR (United Kingdom)	SWE (Sweden)	PL2 (Poland)	GER (Germany)	SCA (Sweden)	PL3 (Poland)	AUS (Australia)

== See also ==
- Motorcycle speedway
