= 2017 Speedway Grand Prix of Germany =

- 2017 IPONE German FIM Speedway Grand Prix

Information
- Date: 9 September 2017
- City: (Germany) Teterow
- Event: 9 of 12
- Referee: (Ukraine) Alex Lyatosinskyy

Stadium details
- Stadium: Bergring Arena
- Length: 314 m (343 yd)

SGP Results
- Best Time
- (gold) Winner: (Slovenia) Matej Žagar
- (silver) Runner-up: (Slovakia) Martin Vaculík
- (bronze) 3rd place: (Australia) Jason Doyle

The 2017 IPONE German FIM Speedway Grand Prix was the ninth race of the 2017 Speedway Grand Prix season. It took place on September 9 at the Bergring Arena in Teterow, Germany.

== Riders ==
First reserve Peter Kildemand replaced Greg Hancock, second reserve Martin Smolinski replaced Nicki Pedersen and third reserve Max Fricke replaced Niels-Kristian Iversen. The Speedway Grand Prix Commission also nominated Kai Huckenbeck as the wild card, and Tobias Kroner and Mathias Bartz both as Track Reserves.

== Results ==
The Grand Prix was won by Slovenia's Matej Žagar, who beat Martin Vaculík, Jason Doyle and Chris Holder in the final. Doyle had initially top scored in the qualifying heats, however the third place saw him move 10 points clear of Patryk Dudek, who was eliminated in the semi-finals.

=== Heat details ===
Placing	Draw	Rider	Total	1	2	3	4	5	6	7	8	9	10	11	12	13	14	15	16	17	18	19	20	Pts	Pos	21	22	23
Gold	12	(Slovenia) (55) Matej Žagar	15			1					2		3			1						2		9	8		3	3
Silver	3	(Slovakia) (54) Martin Vaculík	14	0						2				1				3				3		9	7	3		2
Bronze	14	(Australia) (69) Jason Doyle	17				3		3					2		3							3	14	1	2		1
4	11	(Australia) (23) Chris Holder	14			3				3		3					2						1	12	2		2	0
5	9	(Russia) (89) Emil Sayfutdinov	11			0		1						3					3		3			10	4	1
6	1	(Poland) (692) Patryk Dudek	11	3				3				2				0				2				10	5		1
7	5	(Sweden) (66) Fredrik Lindgren	11		3			2					2					2					2	11	3		0
8	2	(Denmark) (25) Peter Kildemand	10	2					2				1				3				2			10	6	0
9	7	(Germany) (84) Martin Smolinski	8		2					0					3	2					1			8	9
10	8	(Poland) (71) Maciej Janowski	7		1						3			t			0			3				7	10
11	10	(United Kingdom) (108) Tai Woffinden	5			2			1						1			1		0				5	11
12	13	(Sweden) (85) Antonio Lindbäck	4				1	0							2		1					0		4	12
13	4	(Poland) (777) Piotr Pawlicki Jr.	4	1							1				0				2				0	4	13
14	15	(Germany) (16) Kai Huckenbeck	4				2			1			0						0	1				4	14
15	6	(Poland) (95) Bartosz Zmarzlik	2		0				0			0							1			1		2	15
16	16	(Australia) (46) Max Fricke	1				0				0	1						0			0			1	16
17	17	(Germany) (17) Tobias Kroner	0																					0	17
Placing	Draw	Rider	Total	1	2	3	4	5	6	7	8	9	10	11	12	13	14	15	16	17	18	19	20	Pts	Pos	21	22	23

e: retired or mechanical failure • m: exclusion for exceeding two minute time allowance • t: exclusion for touching the tapes • x: other exclusion • f: fell
ns: non-starter • nc: non-classify
Semi-finals: Heat 21: Riders placed 1st, 4th, 6th & 7th in the intermediate classification (after 20 heats)
Heat 22: Riders placed 2nd, 3rd, 5th & 8th in the intermediate classification (after 20 heats)
Big Final (heat 23): The first and second placed riders in each of the Semi-Finals

gate A – inside	gate B	gate C	gate D – outside

== Intermediate classification ==
Qualifies for next season's Grand Prix series
Full-time Grand Prix rider
Wild card, track reserve or qualified reserve

Pos.	Rider	Points	SVN (Slovenia)	POL (Poland)	LAT (Latvia)	CZE (Czech Republic)	DEN (Denmark)	GBR (United Kingdom)	SWE (Sweden)	PL2 (Poland)	GER (Germany)	SCA (Sweden)	PL3 (Poland)	AUS (Australia)
Gold	(Australia) (69) Jason Doyle	114	12	15	10	13	15	13	5	14	17	–	–	–
Silver	(Poland) (692) Patryk Dudek	104	13	9	16	13	14	10	5	13	11	–	–	–
Bronze	(Poland) (71) Maciej Janowski	101	6	16	13	6	17	17	13	6	7	–	–	–
4	(Sweden) (66) Fredrik Lindgren	98	16	16	5	6	8	7	18	11	11	–	–	–
5	(United Kingdom) (108) Tai Woffinden	94	8	13	9	7	11	9	14	18	5	–	–	–
6	(Russia) (89) Emil Sayfutdinov	90	12	6	13	2	14	11	10	11	11	–	–	–
7	(Poland) (95) Bartosz Zmarzlik	82	6	12	6	8	7	16	15	10	2	–	–	–
8	(Slovakia) (54) Martin Vaculík	80	16	10	8	10	1	4	10	7	14	–	–	–
9	(Slovenia) (55) Matej Žagar	73	10	1	10	4	11	12	3	7	15	–	–	–
10	(Australia) (23) Chris Holder	66	6	6	4	11	7	10	6	2	14	–	–	–
11	(Sweden) (85) Antonio Lindbäck	64	2	6	4	9	8	7	19	5	4	–	–	–
12	(Poland) (777) Piotr Pawlicki Jr.	63	7	7	18	7	4	1	6	9	4	–	–	–
13	(United States) (45) Greg Hancock	45	11	4	5	18	7	0	–	–	–	–	–	–
14	(Denmark) (88) Niels Kristian Iversen	44	9	9	7	3	3	7	6	–	–	–	–	–
15	(Denmark) (25) Peter Kildemand	36	–	–	1	8	3	10	4	–	10	–	–	–
16	(Czech Republic) (225) Václav Milík Jr.	20	–	–	–	13	–	–	–	7	–	–	–	–
17	(Germany) (84) Martin Smolinski	13	–	–	–	–	–	–	1	4	8	–	–	–
18	(Latvia) (16) Maksims Bogdanovs	8	–	–	8	–	–	–	–	–	–	–	–	–
19	(Denmark) (52) Michael Jepsen Jensen	8	–	–	–	–	–	–	–	8	–	–	–	–
20	(Denmark) (12) Nicki Pedersen	8	3	5	–	–	–	–	–	–	–	–	–	–
21	(Denmark) (16) Kenneth Bjerre	7	–	–	–	–	7	–	–	–	–	–	–	–
22	(Poland) (16) Krzysztof Kasprzak	6	–	–	–	–	–	–	–	6	–	–	–	–
23	(Germany) (16) Kai Huckenbeck	4	–	–	–	–	–	–	–	–	4	–	–	–
24	(Poland) (16) Przemysław Pawlicki	3	–	3	–	–	–	–	–	–	–	–	–	–
25	(United Kingdom) (16) Craig Cook	2	–	–	–	–	–	2	–	–	–	–	–	–
26	(United Kingdom) (18) Josh Bates	2	–	–	–	–	–	2	–	–	–	–	–	–
27	(Sweden) (16) Linus Sundström	2	–	–	–	–	–	–	2	–	–	–	–	–
28	(Slovenia) (16) Nick Škorja	1	1	–	–	–	–	–	–	–	–	–	–	–
29	(Australia) (46) Max Fricke	1	–	–	–	–	–	–	–	–	1	–	–	–
30	(Czech Republic) (17) Josef Franc	0	–	–	–	0	–	–	–	–	–	–	–	–
31	(Czech Republic) (18) Matěj Kůs	0	–	–	–	0	–	–	–	–	–	–	–	–
32	(United Kingdom) (17) Adam Ellis	0	–	–	–	–	–	0	–	–	–	–	–	–
33	(Germany) (17) Tobias Kroner	0	–	–	–	–	–	–	–	–	0	–	–	–
Pos.	Rider	Points	SVN (Slovenia)	POL (Poland)	LAT (Latvia)	CZE (Czech Republic)	DEN (Denmark)	GBR (United Kingdom)	SWE (Sweden)	PL2 (Poland)	GER (Germany)	SCA (Sweden)	PL3 (Poland)	AUS (Australia)

== See also ==
- Motorcycle speedway
