= 2017 Speedway Grand Prix of Poland III =

2017 Speedway Grand Prix of Poland
- 2017 Nice Toruń FIM Speedway Grand Prix of Poland

Information
- Date: 7 October 2017
- City: (Poland) Toruń
- Event: 11 of 12
- Referee: (Sweden) Krister Gardell

Stadium details
- Stadium: Marian Rose MotoArena
- Capacity: 15,500
- Length: 325 m (355 yd)

SGP Results
- Best Time
- (gold) Winner: (Poland) Patryk Dudek
- (silver) Runner-up: (United Kingdom) Tai Woffinden
- (bronze) 3rd place: (Poland) Bartosz Zmarzlik

The 2017 Nice Toruń FIM Speedway Grand Prix of Poland was the 11th race of the 2017 Speedway Grand Prix season. It took place on October 7 at the Marian Rose MotoArena in Toruń, Poland.

== Riders ==
First reserve Peter Kildemand replaced Greg Hancock, second reserve Martin Smolinski replaced Nicki Pedersen, third reserve Max Fricke replaced Niels-Kristian Iversen and fourth reserve Václav Milík Jr. replaced Fredrik Lindgren. The Speedway Grand Prix Commission also nominated Paweł Przedpełski as the wild card, and Bartosz Smektała and Igor Kopeć-Sobczyński both as Track Reserves.

== Results ==
The Grand Prix was won by Poland's Patryk Dudek, who beat Tai Woffinden, Bartosz Zmarzlik and Matej Žagar in the final. It was the first Grand Prix win of Dudek's career, which kept alive the title race as championship leader Jason Doyle was eliminated in the semi-finals.

=== Heat details ===
Placing	Draw	Rider	Total	1	2	3	4	5	6	7	8	9	10	11	12	13	14	15	16	17	18	19	20	Pts	Pos	21	22	23
Gold	13	(Poland) (692) Patryk Dudek	18				1	3							2		3					3		12	1	3		3
Silver	8	(United Kingdom) (108) Tai Woffinden	15		1						2			3			1			3				10	5		3	2
Bronze	1	(Poland) (95) Bartosz Zmarzlik	14	3				2				2				2				2				11	3		2	1
4	6	(Slovenia) (55) Matej Žagar	11		2				0			3							2			2		9	7	2		0
5	11	(Czech Republic) (225) Václav Milík Jr.	11			3				3		1					2						2	11	2		0
6	16	(Poland) (777) Piotr Pawlicki Jr.	10				2				3	0						2			3			10	4	0
7	7	(Australia) (69) Jason Doyle	10		3					1					0	3					2			9	6	1
8	15	(Poland) (16) Paweł Przedpełski	10				3			2			2						1	1				9	8		1
9	14	(Denmark) (25) Peter Kildemand	8				0		2					2		1							3	8	9
10	2	(Russia) (89) Emil Sayfutdinov	7	1					3				3				0				0			7	10
11	4	(Australia) (23) Chris Holder	7	2							1				3				0				1	7	11
12	3	(Slovakia) (54) Martin Vaculík	5	0						0				1				3				1		5	12
13	9	(Poland) (71) Maciej Janowski	5			1		0						0					3		1			5	13
14	10	(Australia) (46) Max Fricke	4			2			1						1			0						4	14
15	5	(Germany) (84) Martin Smolinski	2		0			1					0					1					0	2	15
16	12	(Sweden) (85) Antonio Lindbäck	1			0					0		1			0						0		1	16
17	17	(Poland) (17) Bartosz Smektała	0																					0	17
Placing	Draw	Rider	Total	1	2	3	4	5	6	7	8	9	10	11	12	13	14	15	16	17	18	19	20	Pts	Pos	21	22	23

e: retired or mechanical failure • m: exclusion for exceeding two minute time allowance • t: exclusion for touching the tapes • x: other exclusion • f: fell
ns: non-starter • nc: non-classify
Semi-finals: Heat 21: Riders placed 1st, 4th, 6th & 7th in the intermediate classification (after 20 heats)
Heat 22: Riders placed 2nd, 3rd, 5th & 8th in the intermediate classification (after 20 heats)
Big Final (heat 23): The first and second placed riders in each of the Semi-Finals

gate A – inside	gate B	gate C	gate D – outside

== Intermediate classification ==
Qualifies for next season's Grand Prix series
Full-time Grand Prix rider
Wild card, track reserve or qualified reserve

Pos.	Rider	Points	SVN (Slovenia)	POL (Poland)	LAT (Latvia)	CZE (Czech Republic)	DEN (Denmark)	GBR (United Kingdom)	SWE (Sweden)	PL2 (Poland)	GER (Germany)	SCA (Sweden)	PL3 (Poland)	AUS (Australia)
Gold	(Australia) (69) Jason Doyle	142	12	15	10	13	15	13	5	14	17	18	10	–
Silver	(Poland) (692) Patryk Dudek	128	13	9	16	13	14	10	5	13	11	6	18	–
Bronze	(United Kingdom) (108) Tai Woffinden	115	8	13	9	7	11	9	14	18	5	6	15	–
4	(Poland) (71) Maciej Janowski	113	6	16	13	6	17	17	13	6	7	7	5	–
5	(Russia) (89) Emil Sayfutdinov	109	12	6	13	2	14	11	10	11	11	12	7	–
6	(Poland) (95) Bartosz Zmarzlik	108	6	12	6	8	7	16	15	10	2	12	14	–
7	(Sweden) (66) Fredrik Lindgren	107	16	16	5	6	8	7	18	11	11	9	–	–
8	(Slovenia) (55) Matej Žagar	97	10	1	10	4	11	12	3	7	15	13	11	–
9	(Slovakia) (54) Martin Vaculík	90	16	10	8	10	1	4	10	7	14	5	5	–
10	(Australia) (23) Chris Holder	82	6	6	4	11	7	10	6	2	14	9	7	–
11	(Poland) (777) Piotr Pawlicki Jr.	79	7	7	18	7	4	1	6	9	4	6	10	–
12	(Sweden) (85) Antonio Lindbäck	73	2	6	4	9	8	7	19	5	4	8	1	–
13	(Denmark) (25) Peter Kildemand	55	–	–	1	8	3	10	4	–	10	11	8	–
14	(United States) (45) Greg Hancock	45	11	4	5	18	7	0	–	–	–	–	–	–
15	(Denmark) (88) Niels Kristian Iversen	44	9	9	7	3	3	7	6	–	–	–	–	–
16	(Czech Republic) (225) Václav Milík Jr.	31	–	–	–	13	–	–	–	7	–	–	11	–
17	(Germany) (84) Martin Smolinski	19	–	–	–	–	–	–	1	4	8	4	2	–
18	(Australia) (46) Max Fricke	11	–	–	–	–	–	–	–	–	1	6	4	–
19	(Poland) (16) Paweł Przedpełski	10	–	–	–	–	–	–	–	–	–	–	10	–
20	(Latvia) (16) Maksims Bogdanovs	8	–	–	8	–	–	–	–	–	–	–	–	–
20	(Denmark) (52) Michael Jepsen Jensen	8	–	–	–	–	–	–	–	8	–	–	–	–
20	(Denmark) (12) Nicki Pedersen	8	3	5	–	–	–	–	–	–	–	–	–	–
23	(Denmark) (16) Kenneth Bjerre	7	–	–	–	–	7	–	–	–	–	–	–	–
24	(Poland) (16) Krzysztof Kasprzak	6	–	–	–	–	–	–	–	6	–	–	–	–
25	(Germany) (16) Kai Huckenbeck	4	–	–	–	–	–	–	–	–	4	–	–	–
25	(Sweden) (17) Jacob Thorssell	4	–	–	–	–	–	–	–	–	–	4	–	–
27	(Poland) (16) Przemysław Pawlicki	3	–	3	–	–	–	–	–	–	–	–	–	–
28	(United Kingdom) (16) Craig Cook	2	–	–	–	–	–	2	–	–	–	–	–	–
28	(United Kingdom) (18) Josh Bates	2	–	–	–	–	–	2	–	–	–	–	–	–
28	(Sweden) (16) Linus Sundström	2	–	–	–	–	–	–	2	–	–	–	–	–
28	(Sweden) (16) Kim Nilsson	2	–	–	–	–	–	–	–	–	–	2	–	–
32	(Slovenia) (16) Nick Škorja	1	1	–	–	–	–	–	–	–	–	–	–	–
33	(Czech Republic) (17) Josef Franc	0	–	–	–	0	–	–	–	–	–	–	–	–
33	(Czech Republic) (18) Matěj Kůs	0	–	–	–	0	–	–	–	–	–	–	–	–
33	(United Kingdom) (17) Adam Ellis	0	–	–	–	–	–	0	–	–	–	–	–	–
33	(Germany) (17) Tobias Kroner	0	–	–	–	–	–	–	–	–	0	–	–	–
33	(Sweden) (18) Filip Hjelmland	0	–	–	–	–	–	–	–	–	–	0	–	–
33	(Poland) (17) Bartosz Smektała	0	–	–	–	–	–	–	–	–	–	–	0	–
Pos.	Rider	Points	SVN (Slovenia)	POL (Poland)	LAT (Latvia)	CZE (Czech Republic)	DEN (Denmark)	GBR (United Kingdom)	SWE (Sweden)	PL2 (Poland)	GER (Germany)	SCA (Sweden)	PL3 (Poland)	AUS (Australia)

== See also ==
- Motorcycle speedway
