= 2017 Speedway Grand Prix of Denmark =

- 2017 Kjærgaard Danish FIM Speedway Grand Prix

Information
- Date: 24 June 2017
- City: (Denmark) Horsens
- Event: 5 of 12
- Referee: (United Kingdom) Craig Ackroyd

Stadium details
- Stadium: CASA Arena
- Capacity: 12,500
- Length: 272 m (297 yd)

SGP Results
- Best Time
- (gold) Winner: (Poland) Maciej Janowski
- (silver) Runner-up: (Russia) Emil Sayfutdinov
- (bronze) 3rd place: (Poland) Patryk Dudek

The 2017 Kjærgaard Danish FIM Speedway Grand Prix was the fifth race of the 2017 Speedway Grand Prix season. It took place on 24 June at the CASA Arena in Horsens, Denmark.

== Riders ==
First reserve Peter Kildemand replaced Nicki Pedersen, who was injured and not fit to race. The Speedway Grand Prix Commission also nominated Kenneth Bjerre as the wild card, and Andreas Lyager and Frederik Jakobsen both as Track Reserves.

== Results ==
The Grand Prix was won by Poland's Maciej Janowski, who beat Emil Sayfutdinov and Patryk Dudek in the final. Jason Doyle had initially top scored during the qualifying heats, however he finished last in the final despite his broken foot. It was second successive Horsens win for Janowski, and it lifted him to third in the overall standings - seven points behind joint leaders Doyle and Dudek.

=== Heat details ===
Placing	Draw	Rider	Total	1	2	3	4	5	6	7	8	9	10	11	12	13	14	15	16	17	18	19	20	Pts	Pos	21	22	23
Gold	3	(Poland) (71) Maciej Janowski	17	2						1				2				3				3		11	2		3	3
Silver	15	(Russia) (89) Emil Sayfutdinov	14				1			2			1						3	3				10	6	2		2
Bronze	12	(Poland) (692) Patryk Dudek	14			3					1		2			3						2		11	3		2	1
4	14	(Australia) (69) Jason Doyle	15				3		2					3		2							2	12	1	3		0
5	7	(Slovenia) (55) Matej Žagar	11		1					3					3	0					3			10	4	1
6	13	(United Kingdom) (108) Tai Woffinden	11				2	3							1		3					1		10	5		1
7	11	(Sweden) (85) Antonio Lindbäck	8			2				0		3					0						3	8	7	0
8	10	(Sweden) (66) Fredrik Lindgren	8			1			3						2			2		0				8	8		0
9	16	(Denmark) (16) Kenneth Bjerre	8				0				3	2						1			2			8	9
10	2	(Poland) (95) Bartosz Zmarzlik	7	1					0				3				2				1			7	10
11	8	(United States) (45) Greg Hancock	7		3						0			1			1			2				7	11
12	1	(Australia) (23) Chris Holder	7	3				2				0				1				1				7	12
13	4	(Poland) (777) Piotr Pawlicki Jr.	4	0							2				0				2				0	4	13
14	5	(Denmark) (25) Peter Kildemand	3		2			0					0					0					1	3	14
15	6	(Denmark) (88) Niels Kristian Iversen	3		0				1			1							1			0		3	15
16	9	(Slovakia) (54) Martin Vaculík	1			0		1						0					0		0			1	16
Placing	Draw	Rider	Total	1	2	3	4	5	6	7	8	9	10	11	12	13	14	15	16	17	18	19	20	Pts	Pos	21	22	23

e: retired or mechanical failure • m: exclusion for exceeding two minute time allowance • t: exclusion for touching the tapes • x: other exclusion • f: fell
ns: non-starter • nc: non-classify
Semi-finals: Heat 21: Riders placed 1st, 4th, 6th & 7th in the intermediate classification (after 20 heats)
Heat 22: Riders placed 2nd, 3rd, 5th & 8th in the intermediate classification (after 20 heats)
Big Final (heat 23): The first and second placed riders in each of the Semi-Finals

gate A – inside	gate B	gate C	gate D – outside

== Intermediate classification ==
Qualifies for next season's Grand Prix series
Full-time Grand Prix rider
Wild card, track reserve or qualified reserve

Pos.	Rider	Points	SVN (Slovenia)	POL (Poland)	LAT (Latvia)	CZE (Czech Republic)	DEN (Denmark)	GBR (United Kingdom)	SWE (Sweden)	PL2 (Poland)	GER (Germany)	SCA (Sweden)	PL3 (Poland)	AUS (Australia)
Gold	(Australia) (69) Jason Doyle	65	12	15	10	13	15	–	–	–	–	–	–	–
Silver	(Poland) (692) Patryk Dudek	65	13	9	16	13	14	–	–	–	–	–	–	–
Bronze	(Poland) (71) Maciej Janowski	58	6	16	13	6	17	–	–	–	–	–	–	–
4	(Sweden) (66) Fredrik Lindgren	51	16	16	5	6	8	–	–	–	–	–	–	–
5	(United Kingdom) (108) Tai Woffinden	48	8	13	9	7	11	–	–	–	–	–	–	–
6	(Russia) (89) Emil Sayfutdinov	47	12	6	13	2	14	–	–	–	–	–	–	–
7	(Slovakia) (54) Martin Vaculík	45	16	10	8	10	1	–	–	–	–	–	–	–
8	(United States) (45) Greg Hancock	45	11	4	5	18	7	–	–	–	–	–	–	–
9	(Poland) (777) Piotr Pawlicki Jr.	43	7	7	18	7	4	–	–	–	–	–	–	–
10	(Poland) (95) Bartosz Zmarzlik	39	6	12	6	8	7	–	–	–	–	–	–	–
11	(Slovenia) (55) Matej Žagar	36	10	1	10	4	11	–	–	–	–	–	–	–
12	(Australia) (23) Chris Holder	34	6	6	4	11	7	–	–	–	–	–	–	–
13	(Denmark) (88) Niels Kristian Iversen	31	9	9	7	3	3	–	–	–	–	–	–	–
14	(Sweden) (85) Antonio Lindbäck	29	2	6	4	9	8	–	–	–	–	–	–	–
15	(Czech Republic) (16) Václav Milík Jr.	13	–	–	–	13	–	–	–	–	–	–	–	–
16	(Denmark) (25) Peter Kildemand	12	–	–	1	8	3	–	–	–	–	–	–	–
17	(Latvia) (16) Maksims Bogdanovs	8	–	–	8	–	–	–	–	–	–	–	–	–
18	(Denmark) (12) Nicki Pedersen	8	3	5	–	–	–	–	–	–	–	–	–	–
19	(Denmark) (16) Kenneth Bjerre	7	–	–	–	–	7	–	–	–	–	–	–	–
20	(Poland) (16) Przemysław Pawlicki	3	–	3	–	–	–	–	–	–	–	–	–	–
21	(Slovenia) (16) Nick Škorja	1	1	–	–	–	–	–	–	–	–	–	–	–
22	(Czech Republic) (17) Josef Franc	0	–	–	–	0	–	–	–	–	–	–	–	–
23	(Czech Republic) (18) Matěj Kůs	0	–	–	–	0	–	–	–	–	–	–	–	–
Pos.	Rider	Points	SVN (Slovenia)	POL (Poland)	LAT (Latvia)	CZE (Czech Republic)	DEN (Denmark)	GBR (United Kingdom)	SWE (Sweden)	PL2 (Poland)	GER (Germany)	SCA (Sweden)	PL3 (Poland)	AUS (Australia)

== See also ==
- Motorcycle speedway
