= 2017 Speedway Grand Prix of Poland =

- 2017 Lotto Warsaw FIM Speedway Grand Prix of Poland

Information
- Date: 13 May 2017
- City: (Poland) Warsaw
- Event: 2 of 12
- Referee: (Sweden) Krister Gardell

Stadium details
- Stadium: Stadion Narodowy
- Capacity: 54,000
- Length: 274.2 m (299.9 yd)

SGP Results
- Best Time
- (gold) Winner: (Sweden) Fredrik Lindgren
- (silver) Runner-up: (Poland) Maciej Janowski
- (bronze) 3rd place: (Australia) Jason Doyle

The 2017 Lotto Warsaw FIM Speedway Grand Prix of Poland was the second race of the 2017 Speedway Grand Prix season. It took place on May 13 at the Stadion Narodowy in Warsaw, Poland.

== Riders ==
The Speedway Grand Prix Commission nominated Przemysław Pawlicki as the wild card, and Krystian Pieszczek and Paweł Przedpełski both as Track Reserves.

== Results ==
The Grand Prix was won by Fredrik Lindgren, who beat Maciej Janowski, Jason Doyle and Martin Vaculík in the final. It was the second Grand Prix win of Lindgren's career, and was a result that took him to the top of the overall championship standings - 5 points clear of Doyle.

=== Heat details ===
Placing	Draw	Rider	Total	1	2	3	4	5	6	7	8	9	10	11	12	13	14	15	16	17	18	19	20	Pts	Pos	21	22	23
Gold	10	(Sweden) (66) Fredrik Lindgren	16			3			2						3			1		1				10	5		3	3
Silver	4	(Poland) (71) Maciej Janowski	16	3							3				0				3				3	12	1	2		2
Bronze	13	(Australia) (69) Jason Doyle	15				3	3							2		2					1		11	4	3		1
4	5	(Slovakia) (54) Martin Vaculík	10		1			2					3					0					2	8	8		2	0
5	7	(United Kingdom) (108) Tai Woffinden	13		2					3					1	3					3			12	2		1
6	8	(Poland) (95) Bartosz Zmarzlik	12		3						2			2			3			2				12	3		0
7	14	(Poland) (692) Patryk Dudek	9				2		3					3		0							1	9	6	0
8	15	(Denmark) (88) Niels Kristian Iversen	9				0			2			1						2	3				8	7	1
9	6	(Poland) (777) Piotr Pawlicki Jr.	7		0				1			3							0			3		7	9
10	3	(Australia) (23) Chris Holder	6	0						0				1				3				2		6	10
11	12	(Russia) (89) Emil Sayfutdinov	6			2					0		2			2						0		6	11
12	16	(Sweden) (85) Antonio Lindbäck	6				1				1	2						2			0			6	12
13	1	(Denmark) (12) Nicki Pedersen	5	2				1				1				1				0				5	13
14	2	(United States) (45) Greg Hancock	4	1					0				0				1				2			4	14
15	9	(Poland) (16) Przemysław Pawlicki	3			1		0						0					1		1			3	15
16	11	(Slovenia) (55) Matej Žagar	1			0				1		0					0						0	1	16
Placing	Draw	Rider	Total	1	2	3	4	5	6	7	8	9	10	11	12	13	14	15	16	17	18	19	20	Pts	Pos	21	22	23

e: retired or mechanical failure • m: exclusion for exceeding two minute time allowance • t: exclusion for touching the tapes • x: other exclusion • f: fell
ns: non-starter • nc: non-classify
Semi-finals: Heat 21: Riders placed 1st, 4th, 6th & 7th in the intermediate classification (after 20 heats)
Heat 22: Riders placed 2nd, 3rd, 5th & 8th in the intermediate classification (after 20 heats)
Big Final (heat 23): The first and second placed riders in each of the Semi-Finals

gate A – inside	gate B	gate C	gate D – outside

== Intermediate classification ==
Qualifies for next season's Grand Prix series
Full-time Grand Prix rider
Wild card, track reserve or qualified reserve

Pos.	Rider	Points	SVN (Slovenia)	POL (Poland)	LAT (Latvia)	CZE (Czech Republic)	DEN (Denmark)	GBR (United Kingdom)	SWE (Sweden)	PL2 (Poland)	GER (Germany)	SCA (Sweden)	PL3 (Poland)	AUS (Australia)
Gold	(Sweden) (66) Fredrik Lindgren	32	16	16	–	–	–	–	–	–	–	–	–	–
Silver	(Australia) (69) Jason Doyle	27	12	15	–	–	–	–	–	–	–	–	–	–
Bronze	(Slovakia) (54) Martin Vaculík	26	16	10	–	–	–	–	–	–	–	–	–	–
4	(Poland) (692) Patryk Dudek	22	13	9	–	–	–	–	–	–	–	–	–	–
5	(Poland) (71) Maciej Janowski	22	6	16	–	–	–	–	–	–	–	–	–	–
6	(United Kingdom) (108) Tai Woffinden	21	8	13	–	–	–	–	–	–	–	–	–	–
7	(Russia) (89) Emil Sayfutdinov	18	12	6	–	–	–	–	–	–	–	–	–	–
8	(Poland) (95) Bartosz Zmarzlik	18	6	12	–	–	–	–	–	–	–	–	–	–
9	(Denmark) (88) Niels Kristian Iversen	18	9	9	–	–	–	–	–	–	–	–	–	–
10	(United States) (45) Greg Hancock	15	11	4	–	–	–	–	–	–	–	–	–	–
11	(Poland) (777) Piotr Pawlicki Jr.	14	7	7	–	–	–	–	–	–	–	–	–	–
12	(Australia) (23) Chris Holder	12	6	6	–	–	–	–	–	–	–	–	–	–
13	(Slovenia) (55) Matej Žagar	11	10	1	–	–	–	–	–	–	–	–	–	–
14	(Sweden) (85) Antonio Lindbäck	8	2	6	–	–	–	–	–	–	–	–	–	–
15	(Denmark) (12) Nicki Pedersen	8	3	5	–	–	–	–	–	–	–	–	–	–
16	(Poland) (16) Przemysław Pawlicki	3	–	3	–	–	–	–	–	–	–	–	–	–
17	(Slovenia) (16) Nick Škorja	1	1	–	–	–	–	–	–	–	–	–	–	–
Pos.	Rider	Points	SVN (Slovenia)	POL (Poland)	LAT (Latvia)	CZE (Czech Republic)	DEN (Denmark)	GBR (United Kingdom)	SWE (Sweden)	PL2 (Poland)	GER (Germany)	SCA (Sweden)	PL3 (Poland)	AUS (Australia)

== See also ==
- motorcycle speedway
