= 2017 Speedway Grand Prix of Slovenia =

- 2017 Slovenian FIM Speedway Grand Prix

Information
- Date: 29 April 2017
- City: (Slovenia) Krško
- Event: 1 of 12
- Referee: (Poland) Marek Wojaczek

Stadium details
- Stadium: Matija Gubec Stadium
- Capacity: 12,000
- Length: 387.7 m (424.0 yd)

SGP Results
- Best Time
- (gold) Winner: (Slovakia) Martin Vaculík
- (silver) Runner-up: (Sweden) Fredrik Lindgren
- (bronze) 3rd place: (Poland) Patryk Dudek

The 2017 Slovenian FIM Speedway Grand Prix was the opening race of the 2017 Speedway Grand Prix season. It took place on 29 April at the Matija Gubec Stadium in Krško, Slovenia.

== Riders ==
The Speedway Grand Prix Commission nominated Nick Škorja as the wild card, and Matic Ivačič and Denis Štojs both as Track Reserves.

== Results ==
The Grand Prix was won by Martin Vaculík, who beat Fredrik Lindgren, Patryk Dudek and Jason Doyle in the final. Emil Sayfutdinov had initially top scored on the night, but was eliminated in the semi-finals.

=== Heat details ===
| Placing | Draw | Rider | Total | 1 | 2 | 3 | 4 | 5 | 6 | 7 | 8 | 9 | 10 | 11 | 12 | 13 | 14 | 15 | 16 | 17 | 18 | 19 | 20 | Pts | Pos | 21 | 22 | 23 |
|---|---|---|---|---|---|---|---|---|---|---|---|---|---|---|---|---|---|---|---|---|---|---|---|---|---|---|---|---|
| Gold | 14 | (Slovakia) (54) Martin Vaculík | 16 | | | | 3 | | 3 | | | | | 1 | | 1 | | | | | | | 3 | 11 | 2 | | 2 | 3 |
| Silver | 7 | (Sweden) (66) Fredrik Lindgren | 16 | | 2 | | | | | 2 | | | | | 2 | 2 | | | | | 3 | | | 11 | 3 | | 3 | 2 |
| Bronze | 5 | (Poland) (692) Patryk Dudek | 13 | | 3 | | | 3 | | | | | 2 | | | | | 0 | | | | | 1 | 9 | 6 | 3 | | 1 |
| 4 | 8 | (Australia) (69) Jason Doyle | 12 | | 1 | | | | | | 3 | | | 3 | | | 3 | | | 0 | | | | 10 | 4 | 2 | | 0 |
| 5 | 12 | (Russia) (89) Emil Sayfutdinov | 12 | | | 1 | | | | | 2 | | 3 | | | 3 | | | | | | 3 | | 12 | 1 | 0 |
| 6 | 11 | (United States) (45) Greg Hancock | 11 | | | 3 | | | | 3 | | 0 | | | | | 2 | | | | | | 2 | 10 | 5 | | 1 |
| 7 | 3 | (Slovenia) (55) Matej Žagar | 10 | 2 | | | | | | 0 | | | | 2 | | | | 3 | | | | 2 | | 9 | 7 | 1 |
| 8 | 10 | (Denmark) (88) Niels Kristian Iversen | 9 | | | 0 | | | 2 | | | | | | 3 | | | 2 | | 2 | | | | 9 | 8 | | 0 |
| 9 | 1 | (United Kingdom) (108) Tai Woffinden | 8 | 3 | | | | 1 | | | | 3 | | | | 0 | | | | 1 | | | | 8 | 9 |
| 10 | 16 | (Poland) (777) Piotr Pawlicki Jr. | 7 | | | | 2 | | | | 1 | 2 | | | | | | 1 | | | 1 | | | 7 | 10 |
| 11 | 6 | (Poland) (95) Bartosz Zmarzlik | 6 | | 0 | | | | 1 | | | 1 | | | | | | | 3 | | | 1 | | 6 | 11 |
| 12 | 15 | (Poland) (71) Maciej Janowski | 6 | | | | 0 | | | 1 | | | 1 | | | | | | 1 | 3 | | | | 6 | 12 |
| 13 | 9 | (Australia) (23) Chris Holder | 6 | | | 2 | | 2 | | | | | | 0 | | | | | 0 | | 2 | | | 6 | 13 |
| 14 | 4 | (Denmark) (12) Nicki Pedersen | 3 | 0 | | | | | | | 0 | | | | 1 | | | | 2 | | | | 0 | 3 | 14 |
| 15 | 13 | (Sweden) (85) Antonio Lindbäck | 2 | | | | 1 | 0 | | | | | | | 0 | | 1 | | | | | 0 | | 2 | 15 |
| 16 | 2 | (Slovenia) (16) Nick Škorja | 1 | 1 | | | | | 0 | | | | 0 | | | | 0 | | | | 0 | | | 1 | 16 |
| Placing | Draw | Rider | Total | 1 | 2 | 3 | 4 | 5 | 6 | 7 | 8 | 9 | 10 | 11 | 12 | 13 | 14 | 15 | 16 | 17 | 18 | 19 | 20 | Pts | Pos | 21 | 22 | 23 |

e: retired or mechanical failure • m: exclusion for exceeding two minute time allowance • t: exclusion for touching the tapes • x: other exclusion • f: fell
ns: non-starter • nc: non-classify
Semi-finals: Heat 21: Riders placed 1st, 4th, 6th & 7th in the intermediate classification (after 20 heats)
Heat 22: Riders placed 2nd, 3rd, 5th & 8th in the intermediate classification (after 20 heats)
Big Final (heat 23): The first and second placed riders in each of the Semi-Finals

| gate A – inside | gate B | gate C | gate D – outside |

== Intermediate classification ==
Qualifies for next season's Grand Prix series
Full-time Grand Prix rider
Wild card, track reserve or qualified reserve

| Pos. | Rider | Points | SVN (Slovenia) | POL (Poland) | LAT (Latvia) | CZE (Czech Republic) | DEN (Denmark) | GBR (United Kingdom) | SWE (Sweden) | PL2 (Poland) | GER (Germany) | SCA (Sweden) | PL3 (Poland) | AUS (Australia) |
| Gold | (Slovakia) (54) Martin Vaculík | 16 | 16 | – | – | – | – | – | – | – | – | – | – | – |
| Silver | (Sweden) (66) Fredrik Lindgren | 16 | 16 | – | – | – | – | – | – | – | – | – | – | – |
| Bronze | (Poland) (692) Patryk Dudek | 13 | 13 | – | – | – | – | – | – | – | – | – | – | – |
| 4 | (Australia) (69) Jason Doyle | 12 | 12 | – | – | – | – | – | – | – | – | – | – | – |
| 5 | (Russia) (89) Emil Sayfutdinov | 12 | 12 | – | – | – | – | – | – | – | – | – | – | – |
| 6 | (United States) (45) Greg Hancock | 11 | 11 | – | – | – | – | – | – | – | – | – | – | – |
| 7 | (Slovenia) (55) Matej Žagar | 10 | 10 | – | – | – | – | – | – | – | – | – | – | – |
| 8 | (Denmark) (88) Niels Kristian Iversen | 9 | 9 | – | – | – | – | – | – | – | – | – | – | – |
| 9 | (United Kingdom) (108) Tai Woffinden | 8 | 8 | – | – | – | – | – | – | – | – | – | – | – |
| 10 | (Poland) (777) Piotr Pawlicki Jr. | 7 | 7 | – | – | – | – | – | – | – | – | – | – | – |
| 11 | (Poland) (95) Bartosz Zmarzlik | 6 | 6 | – | – | – | – | – | – | – | – | – | – | – |
| 12 | (Poland) (71) Maciej Janowski | 6 | 6 | – | – | – | – | – | – | – | – | – | – | – |
| 13 | (Australia) (23) Chris Holder | 6 | 6 | – | – | – | – | – | – | – | – | – | – | – |
| 14 | (Denmark) (12) Nicki Pedersen | 3 | 3 | – | – | – | – | – | – | – | – | – | – | – |
| 15 | (Sweden) (85) Antonio Lindbäck | 2 | 2 | – | – | – | – | – | – | – | – | – | – | – |
| 16 | (Slovenia) (16) Nick Škorja | 1 | 1 | – | – | – | – | – | – | – | – | – | – | – |
| Pos. | Rider | Points | SVN (Slovenia) | POL (Poland) | LAT (Latvia) | CZE (Czech Republic) | DEN (Denmark) | GBR (United Kingdom) | SWE (Sweden) | PL2 (Poland) | GER (Germany) | SCA (Sweden) | PL3 (Poland) | AUS (Australia) |

== See also ==
- motorcycle speedway
