= 2017 Speedway Grand Prix =

23rd season of the Speedway Grand Prix

Season details
- Dates: April 29 — October 28
- Events: 12
- Cities: 12
- Countries: 9
- Riders: 15 permanents 1 wild card(s); 2 track reserves
- Heats: 276 (in 12 events)

Winners
- Champion: AUS Jason Doyle
- Runner-up: POL Patryk Dudek
- 3rd place: GBR Tai Woffinden

The 2017 Speedway Grand Prix season was the 23rd season of the Speedway Grand Prix era, and decided the 72nd FIM Speedway World Championship. It was seventeenth series under the promotion of Benfield Sports International, an IMG company.

The world title was won by Jason Doyle, who finished ahead of debutant Patryk Dudek and former two-time champion Tai Woffinden. It was the first title of Doyle's career, and the first time an Australian had lifted the trophy since Chris Holder in 2012. Defending champion Greg Hancock was unable to complete the season after suffering an injury, competing in only six of the 12 rounds.

== Qualification ==
For the 2017 season there were 15 permanent riders, joined at each Grand Prix by one wild card and two track reserves.

The top eight riders from the 2016 championship qualified automatically. Those riders were joined by the three riders who qualified via the Grand Prix Challenge.

The final four riders were nominated by series promoters, Benfield Sports International, following the completion of the 2016 season.

=== Qualified riders ===
#	Riders	2016 place	GP Ch place	Appearance	Previous appearances in series
45	(United States) Greg Hancock	1	—	23rd	1995–2016
108	(United Kingdom) Tai Woffinden	2	—	6th	2010, 2011, 2013–2016
95	(Poland) Bartosz Zmarzlik	3	—	2nd	2012–2015, 2016
23	(Australia) Chris Holder	4	—	8th	2010–2016
69	(Australia) Jason Doyle	5	—	3rd	2015–2016
777	(Poland) Piotr Pawlicki Jr.	6	9	2nd	2015, 2016
85	(Sweden) Antonio Lindbäck	7	—	8th	2004, 2005–2007, 2009–2010, 2011–2013, 2015, 2016
88	(Denmark) Niels Kristian Iversen	8	—	7th	2004–2005, 2006, 2008, 2009–2010, 2013–2016
55	(Slovenia) Matej Žagar	9	—	7th	2003–2005, 2006–2007, 2008–2009, 2011, 2013–2016
71	(Poland) Maciej Janowski	10	—	3rd	2008, 2012, 2014, 2015–2016
66	(Sweden) Fredrik Lindgren	11	3	8th	2004, 2006–2007, 2008–2014, 2016
12	(Denmark) Nicki Pedersen	13	—	17th	2000, 2001–2016
692	(Poland) Patryk Dudek	17	1	1st	2016
54	(Slovakia) Martin Vaculík	—	2	2nd	2012, 2013
89	(Russia) Emil Sayfutdinov	—	—	6th	2009–2013

=== Qualified substitutes ===
The following riders were nominated as substitutes:

#	Riders	2016 place	GP Ch place
25	(Denmark) Peter Kildemand	12	—
84	(Germany) Martin Smolinski	17	5
46	(Australia) Max Fricke	35	10
225	(Czech Republic) Václav Milík Jr.	25	17
52	(Denmark) Michael Jepsen Jensen	16	—
29	(Latvia) Andžejs Ļebedevs	—	—

== Calendar ==
The 2017 season consisted of 12 events, one more than the 2016 series.

Round	Date	City and venue	Winner	Runner-up	3rd placed	4th placed	Results
1	April 29	(Slovenia) Krško , Slovenia; Matija Gubec Stadium	(Slovakia) Martin Vaculík	(Sweden) Fredrik Lindgren	(Poland) Patryk Dudek	(Australia) Jason Doyle	results
2	May 13	(Poland) Warsaw , Poland; Stadion Narodowy	(Sweden) Fredrik Lindgren	(Poland) Maciej Janowski	(Australia) Jason Doyle	(Slovakia) Martin Vaculík	results
3	May 27	(Latvia) Daugavpils , Latvia; Latvijas Spīdveja Centrs	(Poland) Piotr Pawlicki Jr.	(Poland) Patryk Dudek	(Poland) Maciej Janowski	(Australia) Jason Doyle	results
4	June 10	(Czech Republic) Prague , Czech Republic; Markéta Stadium	(Australia) Jason Doyle	(United States) Greg Hancock	(Czech Republic) Václav Milík Jr.	(Poland) Patryk Dudek	results
5	June 24	(Denmark) Horsens , Denmark; CASA Arena	(Poland) Maciej Janowski	(Russia) Emil Sayfutdinov	(Poland) Patryk Dudek	(Australia) Jason Doyle	results
6	July 22	(United Kingdom) Cardiff , Great Britain; Principality Stadium	(Poland) Maciej Janowski	(Australia) Jason Doyle	(Slovenia) Matej Žagar	(Poland) Bartosz Zmarzlik	results
7	August 12	(Sweden) Målilla , Sweden; G&B Stadium	(Poland) Bartosz Zmarzlik	(Sweden) Antonio Lindbäck	(Sweden) Fredrik Lindgren	(Poland) Maciej Janowski	results
8	August 26	Gorzów , Poland; Edward Jancarz Stadium	(United Kingdom) Tai Woffinden	(Poland) Patryk Dudek	(Australia) Jason Doyle	(Poland) Bartosz Zmarzlik	results
9	September 9	(Germany) Teterow , Germany; Bergring Arena	(Slovenia) Matej Žagar	(Slovakia) Martin Vaculík	(Australia) Jason Doyle	(Australia) Chris Holder	results
10	September 23	Stockholm , Sweden; Friends Arena	(Slovenia) Matej Žagar	(Poland) Bartosz Zmarzlik	(Australia) Jason Doyle	(Denmark) Peter Kildemand	results
11	October 7	Toruń , Poland; Rose Motoarena	(Poland) Patryk Dudek	(United Kingdom) Tai Woffinden	(Poland) Bartosz Zmarzlik	(Slovenia) Matej Žagar	results
12	October 28	(Australia) Melbourne , Australia; Etihad Stadium	(Australia) Jason Doyle	(United Kingdom) Tai Woffinden	(Poland) Bartosz Zmarzlik	(Poland) Patryk Dudek	results

== Final Classification ==
Qualifies for next season's Grand Prix series
Full-time Grand Prix rider
Wild card, track reserve or qualified reserve

Pos.	Rider	Points	SVN (Slovenia)	POL (Poland)	LAT (Latvia)	CZE (Czech Republic)	DEN (Denmark)	GBR (United Kingdom)	SWE (Sweden)	PL2 (Poland)	GER (Germany)	SCA (Sweden)	PL3 (Poland)	AUS (Australia)
Gold	(Australia) (69) Jason Doyle (C)	161	12	15	10	13	15	13	5	14	17	18	10	19
Silver	(Poland) (692) Patryk Dudek	143	13	9	16	13	14	10	5	13	11	6	18	15
Bronze	(United Kingdom) (108) Tai Woffinden	131	8	13	9	7	11	9	14	18	5	6	15	16
4	(Poland) (71) Maciej Janowski	122	6	16	13	6	17	17	13	6	7	7	5	9
5	(Poland) (95) Bartosz Zmarzlik	121	6	12	6	8	7	16	15	10	2	12	14	13
6	(Russia) (89) Emil Sayfutdinov	117	12	6	13	2	14	11	10	11	11	12	7	8
7	(Slovenia) (55) Matej Žagar	107	10	1	10	4	11	12	3	7	15	13	11	10
8	(Sweden) (66) Fredrik Lindgren	107	16	16	5	6	8	7	18	11	11	9	–	–
9	(Slovakia) (54) Martin Vaculík	99	16	10	8	10	1	4	10	7	14	5	5	9
10	(Australia) (23) Chris Holder	85	6	6	4	11	7	10	6	2	14	9	7	3
11	(Poland) (777) Piotr Pawlicki Jr.	81	7	7	18	7	4	1	6	9	4	6	10	2
12	(Sweden) (85) Antonio Lindbäck	77	2	6	4	9	8	7	19	5	4	8	1	4
13	(Denmark) (25) Peter Kildemand	61	–	–	1	8	3	10	4	–	10	11	8	6
14	(United States) (45) Greg Hancock	45	11	4	5	18	7	0	–	–	–	–	–	–
15	(Denmark) (88) Niels Kristian Iversen	44	9	9	7	3	3	7	6	–	–	–	–	–
16	(Czech Republic) (225) Václav Milík Jr.	31	–	–	–	13	–	–	–	7	–	–	11	–
17	(Germany) (84) Martin Smolinski	25	–	–	–	–	–	–	1	4	8	4	2	6
18	(Australia) (46) Max Fricke	11	–	–	–	–	–	–	–	–	1	6	4	–
19	(Poland) (16) Paweł Przedpełski	10	–	–	–	–	–	–	–	–	–	–	10	–
20	(Latvia) (16) Maksims Bogdanovs	8	–	–	8	–	–	–	–	–	–	–	–	–
20	(Denmark) (52) Michael Jepsen Jensen	8	–	–	–	–	–	–	–	8	–	–	–	–
20	(Denmark) (12) Nicki Pedersen	8	3	5	–	–	–	–	–	–	–	–	–	–
23	(Denmark) (16) Kenneth Bjerre	7	–	–	–	–	7	–	–	–	–	–	–	–
24	(Poland) (16) Krzysztof Kasprzak	6	–	–	–	–	–	–	–	6	–	–	–	–
24	(Australia) (20) Rohan Tungate	6	–	–	–	–	–	–	–	–	–	–	–	6
26	(Germany) (16) Kai Huckenbeck	4	–	–	–	–	–	–	–	–	4	–	–	–
26	(Sweden) (17) Jacob Thorssell	4	–	–	–	–	–	–	–	–	–	4	–	–
26	(Australia) (17) Justin Sedgmen	4	–	–	–	–	–	–	–	–	–	–	–	4
29	(Poland) (16) Przemysław Pawlicki	3	–	3	–	–	–	–	–	–	–	–	–	–
29	(Australia) (19) Brady Kurtz	3	–	–	–	–	–	–	–	–	–	–	–	3
29	(Australia) (18) Davey Watt	3	–	–	–	–	–	–	–	–	–	–	–	3
32	(United Kingdom) (16) Craig Cook	2	–	–	–	–	–	2	–	–	–	–	–	–
32	(United Kingdom) (18) Josh Bates	2	–	–	–	–	–	2	–	–	–	–	–	–
32	(Sweden) (16) Linus Sundström	2	–	–	–	–	–	–	2	–	–	–	–	–
32	(Sweden) (16) Kim Nilsson	2	–	–	–	–	–	–	–	–	–	2	–	–
32	(Australia) (16) Sam Masters	2	–	–	–	–	–	–	–	–	–	–	–	2
37	(Slovenia) (16) Nick Škorja	1	1	–	–	–	–	–	–	–	–	–	–	–
38	(Czech Republic) (17) Josef Franc	0	–	–	–	0	–	–	–	–	–	–	–	–
38	(Czech Republic) (18) Matěj Kůs	0	–	–	–	0	–	–	–	–	–	–	–	–
38	(United Kingdom) (17) Adam Ellis	0	–	–	–	–	–	0	–	–	–	–	–	–
38	(Germany) (17) Tobias Kroner	0	–	–	–	–	–	–	–	–	0	–	–	–
38	(Sweden) (18) Filip Hjelmland	0	–	–	–	–	–	–	–	–	–	0	–	–
38	(Poland) (17) Bartosz Smektała	0	–	–	–	–	–	–	–	–	–	–	0	–
Pos.	Rider	Points	SVN (Slovenia)	POL (Poland)	LAT (Latvia)	CZE (Czech Republic)	DEN (Denmark)	GBR (United Kingdom)	SWE (Sweden)	PL2 (Poland)	GER (Germany)	SCA (Sweden)	PL3 (Poland)	AUS (Australia)

== See also ==
- 2017 Individual Speedway Junior World Championship
- 2018 Speedway Grand Prix
