= 2017 Speedway Grand Prix of Czech Republic =

- 2017 Mitas Czech Republic FIM Speedway Grand Prix

Information
- Date: 10 June 2017
- City: (Czech Republic) Prague
- Event: 4 of 12
- Referee: (United Kingdom) Craig Ackroyd

Stadium details
- Stadium: Markéta Stadium
- Capacity: 10,000
- Length: 353 m (386 yd)

SGP Results
- Best Time
- (gold) Winner: (Australia) Jason Doyle
- (silver) Runner-up: (United States) Greg Hancock
- (bronze) 3rd place: (Czech Republic) Václav Milík Jr.

The 2017 Mitas Czech Republic FIM Speedway Grand Prix was the fourth race of the 2017 Speedway Grand Prix season. It took place on June 10 at the Markéta Stadium in Prague, Czech Republic.

== Riders ==
First reserve Peter Kildemand replaced Nicki Pedersen, who was injured and not fit to race. The Speedway Grand Prix Commission also nominated Václav Milík Jr. as the wild card, and Josef Franc and Matěj Kůs both as Track Reserves.

== Results ==
The Grand Prix was won by Australia's Jason Doyle, who beat world champion Greg Hancock and wild card Václav Milík Jr. in the final. It was the fifth Grand Prix win of Doyle's career, and the second time in a row that he won in Prague. Hancock had initially top scored during the qualifying heats.

Championship leader Patryk Dudek finished fourth in the final, maintaining a one-point leader over Doyle in the overall standings.

=== Heat details ===
Placing	Draw	Rider	Total	1	2	3	4	5	6	7	8	9	10	11	12	13	14	15	16	17	18	19	20	Pts	Pos	21	22	23
Gold	11	(Australia) (69) Jason Doyle	13			0				1		2					3						2	8	8		2	3
Silver	1	(United States) (45) Greg Hancock	18	3				2				3				2				3				13	1	3		2
Bronze	15	(Czech Republic) (16) Václav Milík Jr.	13				1			3			3						2	1				10	4	2		1
4	13	(Poland) (692) Patryk Dudek	13				3	1							3		2					1		10	3		3	0
5	9	(Australia) (23) Chris Holder	11			1		0						3					3		3			10	2		1
6	14	(Slovakia) (54) Martin Vaculík	10				2		2					1		1							3	9	6	1
7	5	(Sweden) (85) Antonio Lindbäck	9		3			3					1					2					0	9	5		0
8	10	(Denmark) (25) Peter Kildemand	8			3			0						2			3		0				8	7	0
9	2	(Poland) (95) Bartosz Zmarzlik	8	1					3				2				1				1			8	9
10	8	(United Kingdom) (108) Tai Woffinden	7		2						3			0			0			2				7	10
11	7	(Poland) (777) Piotr Pawlicki Jr.	7		1					2					1	3					0			7	11
12	12	(Sweden) (66) Fredrik Lindgren	6			2					1		0			0						3		6	12
13	3	(Poland) (71) Maciej Janowski	6	2						0				2				0				2		6	13
14	16	(Slovenia) (55) Matej Žagar	4				0				0	1						1			2			4	14
15	4	(Denmark) (88) Niels Kristian Iversen	3	0							2				0				0				1	3	15
16	6	(Russia) (89) Emil Sayfutdinov	2		0				1			0							1			0		2	16
17	17	(Czech Republic) (17) Josef Franc	0																					0	17
18	18	(Czech Republic) (18) Matěj Kůs	0																					0	18
Placing	Draw	Rider	Total	1	2	3	4	5	6	7	8	9	10	11	12	13	14	15	16	17	18	19	20	Pts	Pos	21	22	23

e: retired or mechanical failure • m: exclusion for exceeding two minute time allowance • t: exclusion for touching the tapes • x: other exclusion • f: fell
ns: non-starter • nc: non-classify
Semi-finals: Heat 21: Riders placed 1st, 4th, 6th & 7th in the intermediate classification (after 20 heats)
Heat 22: Riders placed 2nd, 3rd, 5th & 8th in the intermediate classification (after 20 heats)
Big Final (heat 23): The first and second placed riders in each of the Semi-Finals

gate A – inside	gate B	gate C	gate D – outside

== Intermediate classification ==
Qualifies for next season's Grand Prix series
Full-time Grand Prix rider
Wild card, track reserve or qualified reserve

Pos.	Rider	Points	SVN (Slovenia)	POL (Poland)	LAT (Latvia)	CZE (Czech Republic)	DEN (Denmark)	GBR (United Kingdom)	SWE (Sweden)	PL2 (Poland)	GER (Germany)	SCA (Sweden)	PL3 (Poland)	AUS (Australia)
Gold	(Poland) (692) Patryk Dudek	51	13	9	16	13	–	–	–	–	–	–	–	–
Silver	(Australia) (69) Jason Doyle	50	12	15	10	13	–	–	–	–	–	–	–	–
Bronze	(Slovakia) (54) Martin Vaculík	44	16	10	8	10	–	–	–	–	–	–	–	–
4	(Sweden) (66) Fredrik Lindgren	43	16	16	5	6	–	–	–	–	–	–	–	–
5	(Poland) (71) Maciej Janowski	41	6	16	13	6	–	–	–	–	–	–	–	–
6	(Poland) (777) Piotr Pawlicki Jr.	39	7	7	18	7	–	–	–	–	–	–	–	–
7	(United States) (45) Greg Hancock	38	11	4	5	18	–	–	–	–	–	–	–	–
8	(United Kingdom) (108) Tai Woffinden	37	8	13	9	7	–	–	–	–	–	–	–	–
9	(Russia) (89) Emil Sayfutdinov	33	12	6	13	2	–	–	–	–	–	–	–	–
10	(Poland) (95) Bartosz Zmarzlik	32	6	12	6	8	–	–	–	–	–	–	–	–
11	(Denmark) (88) Niels Kristian Iversen	28	9	9	7	3	–	–	–	–	–	–	–	–
12	(Australia) (23) Chris Holder	27	6	6	4	11	–	–	–	–	–	–	–	–
13	(Slovenia) (55) Matej Žagar	25	10	1	10	4	–	–	–	–	–	–	–	–
14	(Sweden) (85) Antonio Lindbäck	21	2	6	4	9	–	–	–	–	–	–	–	–
15	(Czech Republic) (16) Václav Milík Jr.	13	–	–	–	13	–	–	–	–	–	–	–	–
16	(Denmark) (25) Peter Kildemand	9	–	–	1	8	–	–	–	–	–	–	–	–
17	(Latvia) (16) Maksims Bogdanovs	8	–	–	8	–	–	–	–	–	–	–	–	–
18	(Denmark) (12) Nicki Pedersen	8	3	5	–	–	–	–	–	–	–	–	–	–
19	(Poland) (16) Przemysław Pawlicki	3	–	3	–	–	–	–	–	–	–	–	–	–
20	(Slovenia) (16) Nick Škorja	1	1	–	–	–	–	–	–	–	–	–	–	–
21	(Czech Republic) (17) Josef Franc	0	–	–	–	0	–	–	–	–	–	–	–	–
22	(Czech Republic) (18) Matěj Kůs	0	–	–	–	0	–	–	–	–	–	–	–	–
Pos.	Rider	Points	SVN (Slovenia)	POL (Poland)	LAT (Latvia)	CZE (Czech Republic)	DEN (Denmark)	GBR (United Kingdom)	SWE (Sweden)	PL2 (Poland)	GER (Germany)	SCA (Sweden)	PL3 (Poland)	AUS (Australia)

== See also ==
- Motorcycle speedway
