= 2022 European Team Speedway Championship =

European Team Speedway Championship

The 2022 European Team Speedway Championship was the inaugural edition of the European motorcycle speedway team event to determine the team champions of Europe. It was added to the speedway racing calendar as an early season event, in addition to the existing European individual and pairs events.

Poland won the title.

== Final ==
- 15 April, Poznań, Poland

| Position | Team | Points | Riders |
|---|---|---|---|
| 1 | Poland | 47 | Janusz Kołodziej15; Bartosz Zmarzlik 14; Patryk Dudek 11; Maciej Janowski 7 Kacper Woryna DNR |
| 2 | Denmark | 28 | Anders Thomsen 7 Rasmus Jensen 6 Frederik Jakobsen 6 Patrick Hansen 6 Leon Madsen 3 |
| 3 | (United Kingdom) Great Britain | 27 | Dan Bewley 11; Robert Lambert 10; Chris Harris 4 Adam Ellis 2 Tom Brennan DNR |
| 4 | Sweden | 18 | Freddie Lindgren 8 Oliver Berntzon 4 Jacob Thorssell 4 Kim Nilsson 2 Filip Hjelmland 0 |
