= 2017 Speedway Grand Prix of Latvia =

Latvian speedway competition

- 2017 Rietumu Bank Latvian FIM Speedway Grand Prix

Information
- Date: 27 May 2017
- City: (Latvia) Daugavpils
- Event: 3 of 12
- Referee: (Denmark) Jesper Steentoft

Stadium details
- Stadium: Latvijas Spīdveja Centrs
- Capacity: 7,500
- Length: 373 m (408 yd)

SGP Results
- Best Time
- (gold) Winner: (Poland) Piotr Pawlicki Jr.
- (silver) Runner-up: (Poland) Patryk Dudek
- (bronze) 3rd place: (Poland) Maciej Janowski

The 2017 Rietumu Bank Latvian FIM Speedway Grand Prix was the third race of the 2017 Speedway Grand Prix season. It took place on May 27 at the Latvijas Spīdveja Centrs in Daugavpils, Latvia.

== Riders ==
First reserve Peter Kildemand replaced Nicki Pedersen, who was injured and not fit to race. The Speedway Grand Prix Commission also nominated Maksims Bogdanovs as the wild card, and Kjasts Puodžuks and Jevgeņijs Kostigovs both as Track Reserves.

== Results ==
The Grand Prix was won by Poland's Piotr Pawlicki Jr., who beat compatriots Patryk Dudek and Maciej Janowski and Australia's Jason Doyle in the final. It was the first Grand Prix win of Pawlicki Jr.'s career, and the first time in Grand Prix history that three riders from the same nation occupied the first three places on the podium.

Dudek's second-place finish resulted in him topping the overall standings. Previous series leader Fredrik Lindgren, who failed to make the semi-finals for the first time this year, slipped to joint-second place with Doyle, both just one point behind Dudek.

=== Heat details ===
Placing	Draw	Rider	Total	1	2	3	4	5	6	7	8	9	10	11	12	13	14	15	16	17	18	19	20	Pts	Pos	21	22	23
Gold	12	(Poland) (777) Piotr Pawlicki Jr.	18			1					2		3			3						3		12	1	3		3
Silver	16	(Poland) (692) Patryk Dudek	16				1				1	3						3			3			11	3		3	2
Bronze	8	(Poland) (71) Maciej Janowski	14		3						3			3			1			1				11	4	2		1
4	5	(Australia) (69) Jason Doyle	10		2			1					0					2					3	8	8		2	0
5	13	(Russia) (89) Emil Sayfutdinov	13				2	3							3		3					1		12	2		1
6	1	(Slovenia) (55) Matej Žagar	10	2				2				1				2				3				10	5		0
7	2	(United Kingdom) (108) Tai Woffinden	9	3					1				2				2				0			8	7	1
8	9	(Latvia) (16) Maksims Bogdanovs	8			3		0						0					3		2			8	6	0
9	14	(Slovakia) (54) Martin Vaculík	8				3		2					1		1							1	8	9
10	3	(Denmark) (88) Niels Kristian Iversen	7	0						3				2				0				2		7	10
11	10	(Poland) (95) Bartosz Zmarzlik	6			0			3						2			1		0				6	11
12	6	(United States) (45) Greg Hancock	5		1				0			2							2			0		5	12
13	4	(Sweden) (66) Fredrik Lindgren	5	1							0				1				1				2	5	13
14	11	(Australia) (23) Chris Holder	4			2				2		0					0						0	4	14
15	15	(Sweden) (85) Antonio Lindbäck	4				0			1			1						0	2				4	15
16	7	(Denmark) (25) Peter Kildemand	1		0					0					0	0					1			1	16
Placing	Draw	Rider	Total	1	2	3	4	5	6	7	8	9	10	11	12	13	14	15	16	17	18	19	20	Pts	Pos	21	22	23

e: retired or mechanical failure • m: exclusion for exceeding two minute time allowance • t: exclusion for touching the tapes • x: other exclusion • f: fell
ns: non-starter • nc: non-classify
Semi-finals: Heat 21: Riders placed 1st, 4th, 6th & 7th in the intermediate classification (after 20 heats)
Heat 22: Riders placed 2nd, 3rd, 5th & 8th in the intermediate classification (after 20 heats)
Big Final (heat 23): The first and second placed riders in each of the Semi-Finals

gate A – inside	gate B	gate C	gate D – outside

== Intermediate classification ==
Qualifies for next season's Grand Prix series
Full-time Grand Prix rider
Wild card, track reserve or qualified reserve

Pos.	Rider	Points	SVN (Slovenia)	POL (Poland)	LAT (Latvia)	CZE (Czech Republic)	DEN (Denmark)	GBR (United Kingdom)	SWE (Sweden)	PL2 (Poland)	GER (Germany)	SCA (Sweden)	PL3 (Poland)	AUS (Australia)
Gold	(Poland) (692) Patryk Dudek	38	13	9	16	–	–	–	–	–	–	–	–	–
Silver	(Sweden) (66) Fredrik Lindgren	37	16	16	5	–	–	–	–	–	–	–	–	–
Bronze	(Australia) (69) Jason Doyle	37	12	15	10	–	–	–	–	–	–	–	–	–
4	(Poland) (71) Maciej Janowski	35	6	16	13	–	–	–	–	–	–	–	–	–
5	(Slovakia) (54) Martin Vaculík	34	16	10	8	–	–	–	–	–	–	–	–	–
6	(Poland) (777) Piotr Pawlicki Jr.	32	7	7	18	–	–	–	–	–	–	–	–	–
7	(Russia) (89) Emil Sayfutdinov	31	12	6	13	–	–	–	–	–	–	–	–	–
8	(United Kingdom) (108) Tai Woffinden	30	8	13	9	–	–	–	–	–	–	–	–	–
9	(Denmark) (88) Niels Kristian Iversen	25	9	9	7	–	–	–	–	–	–	–	–	–
10	(Poland) (95) Bartosz Zmarzlik	24	6	12	6	–	–	–	–	–	–	–	–	–
11	(Slovenia) (55) Matej Žagar	21	10	1	10	–	–	–	–	–	–	–	–	–
12	(United States) (45) Greg Hancock	20	11	4	5	–	–	–	–	–	–	–	–	–
13	(Australia) (23) Chris Holder	16	6	6	4	–	–	–	–	–	–	–	–	–
14	(Sweden) (85) Antonio Lindbäck	12	2	6	4	–	–	–	–	–	–	–	–	–
15	(Latvia) (16) Maksims Bogdanovs	8	–	–	8	–	–	–	–	–	–	–	–	–
16	(Denmark) (12) Nicki Pedersen	8	3	5	–	–	–	–	–	–	–	–	–	–
17	(Poland) (16) Przemysław Pawlicki	3	–	3	–	–	–	–	–	–	–	–	–	–
18	(Slovenia) (16) Nick Škorja	1	1	–	–	–	–	–	–	–	–	–	–	–
19	(Denmark) (25) Peter Kildemand	1	–	–	1	–	–	–	–	–	–	–	–	–
Pos.	Rider	Points	SVN (Slovenia)	POL (Poland)	LAT (Latvia)	CZE (Czech Republic)	DEN (Denmark)	GBR (United Kingdom)	SWE (Sweden)	PL2 (Poland)	GER (Germany)	SCA (Sweden)	PL3 (Poland)	AUS (Australia)

== See also ==
- Motorcycle speedway
