= Josh Bates (speedway rider) =

British speedway rider (born 1996)

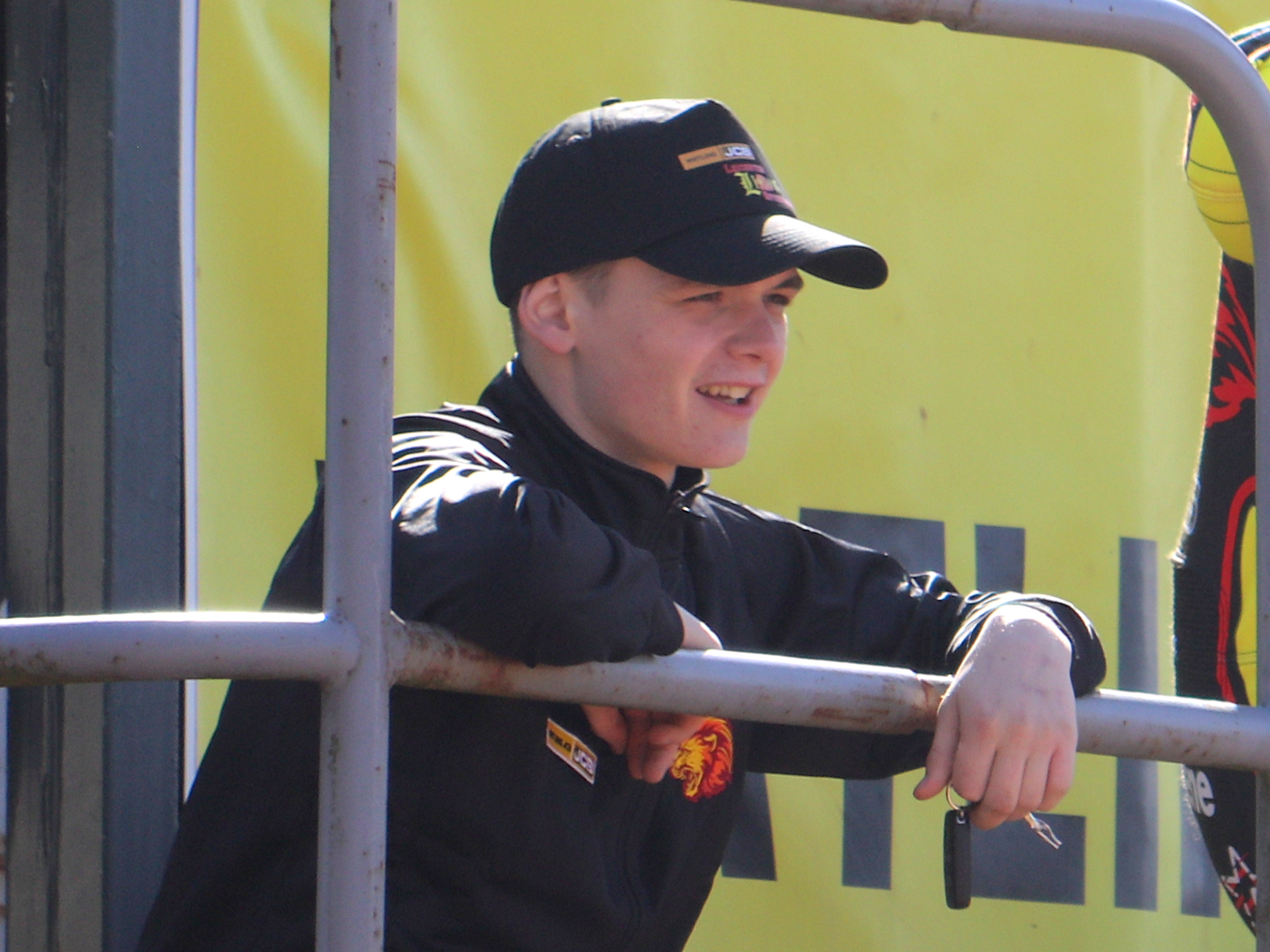
- Born: 1 February 1996 (age 30); Barnsley, England
- Nationality: British

Career history
- 2012–2014: Mildenhall Fen Tigers
- 2013: Scunthorpe Scorpions
- 2014, 2017, 2019, 2021: Leicester Lions
- 2014–2017, 2021: Sheffield Tigers
- 2015: Wolverhampton Wolves
- 2015: Birmingham Brummies
- 2016: Coventry Bees
- 2019: Peterborough Panthers
- 2020: Somerset Rebels

Speedway Grand Prix statistics
- Starts: 1
- Podiums: 0 (0-0-0)
- Finalist: 0 times
- Winner: 0 times

Individual honours
- 2014, 2016: British Under-21 Champion
- 2015: British Under-19 Champion

Team honours
- 2012: National League
- 2012: National League KO Cup
- 2012: National League Trophy
- 2017: SGB Championship

Joshua Paul Bates (born 1 February 1996) is a British speedway rider.

== Early career ==
Born in Barnsley, Bates had never been on any type of motorbike until the beginning of 2010, when he got his first 125cc speedway bike. After a few months of practicing on this, he was ready for a 250cc, which he got in June 2010. After a few more months of practice, he entered the 2011 250cc British Championship, where he finished fourth overall. As well as competing in the British championship, he rode in the amateur summer championship at Scunthorpe which he won and he also competed in the 250cc world championship in Sweden.

== Career ==
In January 2012, Bates started riding a 500cc for the first time, soon after he was offered a team place by the Mildenhall Fen Tigers. He suffered a broken arm in a crash in August 2012, but made a successful return from injury and helped the Fen Tigers complete the National League "Grand Slam" that year.

In 2013, Bates was signed by Scunthorpe Scorpions to ride in the Premier League. In 2014, he won the British Under-21 Championship.

Bates rode for both the Wolverhampton Wolves and the Sheffield Tigers in 2015 and Sheffield and Coventry Storm in 2016. He also won the British Under-21 Championship for a second time in 2016 and reached the final of the World U21 Championship. For the 2017 season, he remained at Sheffield for the third season running and joined Leicester Lions.

Bates' career suffered after a crash at Peterborough in 2019. He returned for the 2021 season as a reserve rider at Sheffield and a team rider for Leicester.
