= Adam Ellis (speedway rider) =

British grasstrack and speedway rider (born 1996)

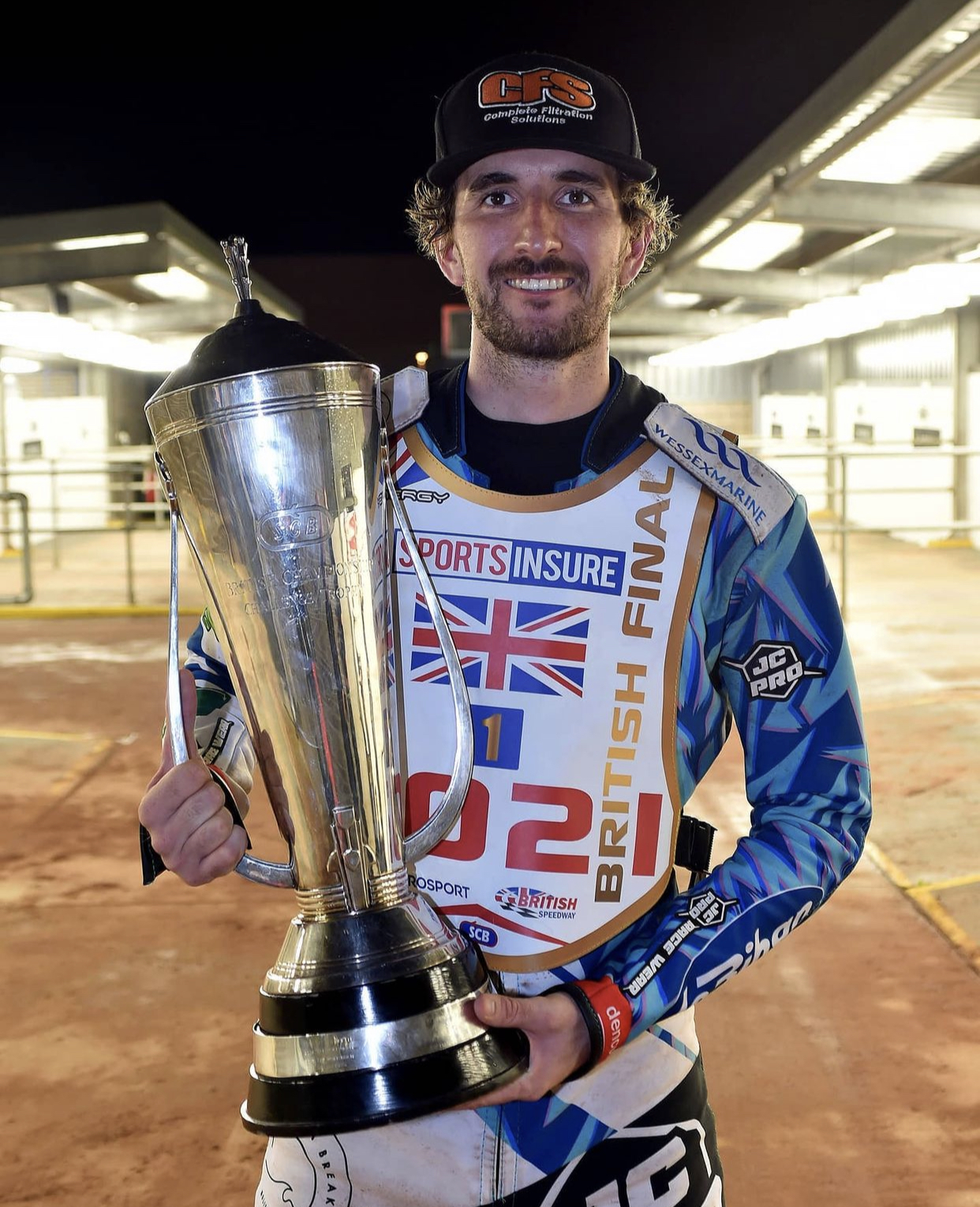
- Ellis in 2021
- Born: 21 March 1996 (age 30); Marmande, France
- Nationality: British

Career history

Great Britain
- 2012–2013: Isle of Wight Islanders
- 2013–2014, 2024–2025: Ipswich Witches
- 2014–2015, 2018: Lakeside Hammers
- 2015, 2019: Birmingham Brummies
- 2016: Eastbourne Eagles
- 2016, 2020: Poole Pirates
- 2017–2020: Swindon Robins
- 2021: Scunthorpe Scorpions
- 2021–2023: Sheffield Tigers

Poland
- 2017–2018: Ostrów
- 2019: Gorzów
- 2020–2021: Rzeszów
- 2022: Daugavpils
- 2023: Opole
- 2024: Piła
- 2025: Gniezno

Sweden
- 2020–2021: Piraterna
- 2022: Dackarna
- 2022, 2025: Rospiggarna
- 2024: Vargarna

Denmark
- 2019: Grindsted
- 2023: Fjelsted
- 2024: Region Varde

Individual honours
- 2021: British Champion

Team honours
- 2023: Speedway World Cup silver
- 2018: World Longtrack Team silver
- 2017, 2019, 2023, 2025: tier 1 league champion
- 2022: tier 1 League Cup
- 2015: tier 3 NL
- 2015: tier 3 NL fours
- 2016: NL tier 3 KO Cup

Adam Ellis (born 21 March 1996) is a British grasstrack and motorcycle speedway rider and former British champion.

== Biography ==
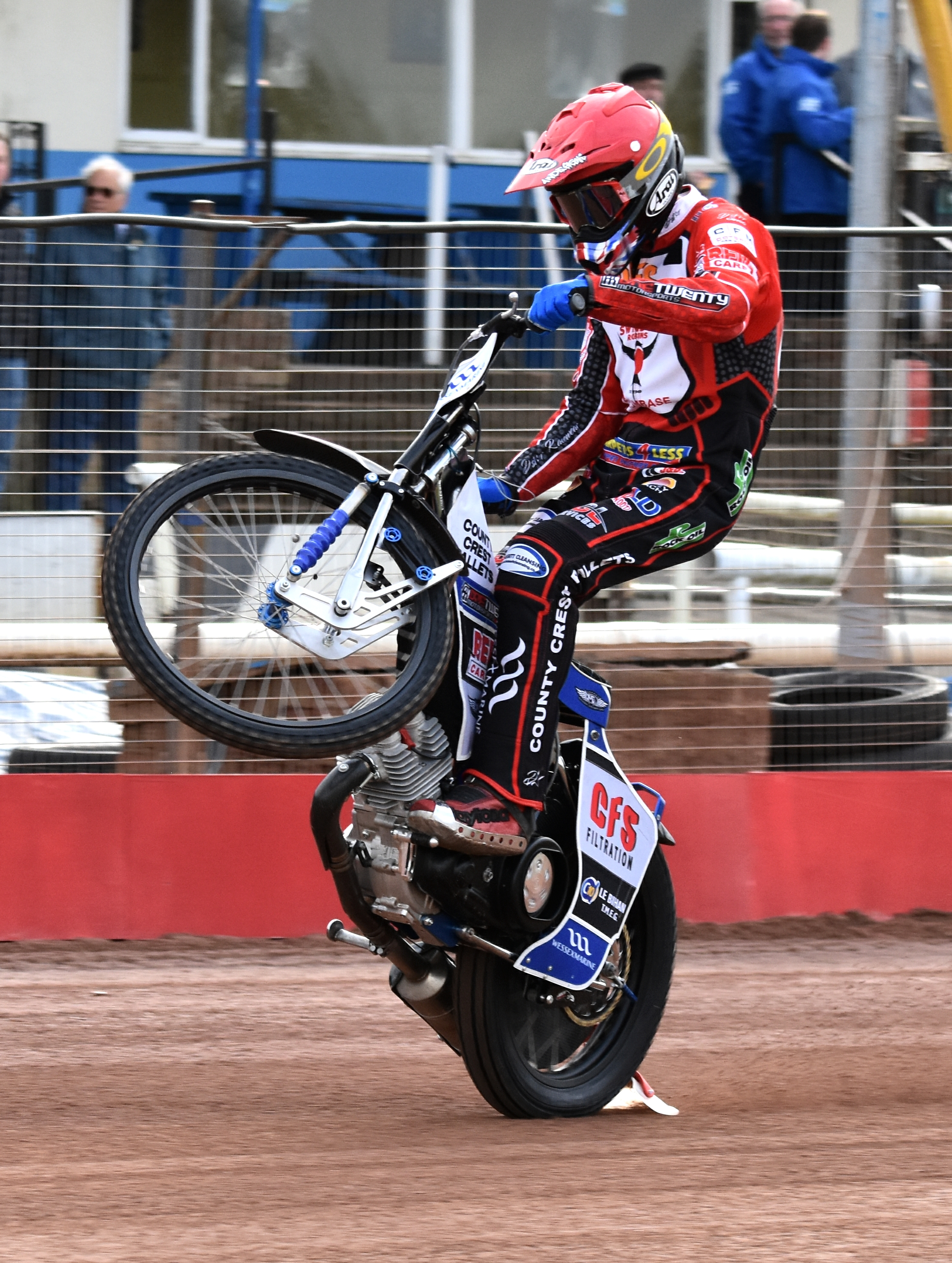
Adam Ellis riding for Swindon

Born in Marmande, France, Ellis began grasstrack racing in 2009, going on to finish second in the 250cc French Grasstrack Championship in 2010, and winning the championship in 2011. In 2012 he again finished runner up, and also competed in the French Speedway Championship. He was mentored by former rider Matt Read. He also began speedway racing in the United Kingdom, winning two rounds of the British Junior Championship. He was signed by the National League team Isle of Wight Islanders as their number eight, averaging 7.61 from eight matches, and also became a Lakeside Hammers asset, making his Elite League debut in October. After the end of the 2012 season he was confirmed in the Islanders team for 2013, as well as getting a place in the Ipswich Witches Premier League team and an Elite League contract with Lakeside Hammers.

In May 2013, Ellis was selected to compete in the World Under-21 speedway semi-final in Lonigo. In 2017 he was made an asset by Swindon Robins along with Zach Wajtknecht.

Ellis was part of the Birmingham Brummies team that won the National League Fours, held on 14 June 2015 at Brandon Stadium.

In 2019, Ellis won the SGP Premiership with Robins for the second time.

Ellis became the British champion in 2021 after winning the 2021 British Speedway Championship. In 2022, he rode for the Sheffield Tigers in the SGB Premiership 2022 and for the Birmingham in the SGB Championship 2022. He helped Sheffield win the League cup and reach the Play off final.

In 2023, Ellis re-signed for Sheffield for the SGB Premiership 2023, where he won the league title with the club. Also in 2023, he was part of the British team that won the silver medal in the 2023 Speedway World Cup final.

Ellis signed for Ipswich for the 2024 season, ten years after last riding for the club. In 2025, he helped Ipswich win the SGB Premiership 2025.

== World Longtrack team championship ==
- 2018 – (France) Morizes 5/46pts (with James Shanes, Zach Wajtknecht & Chris Harris) Second
