= Piotr Pawlicki Jr. =

Polish speedway rider (born 1994)

Piotr Pawlicki
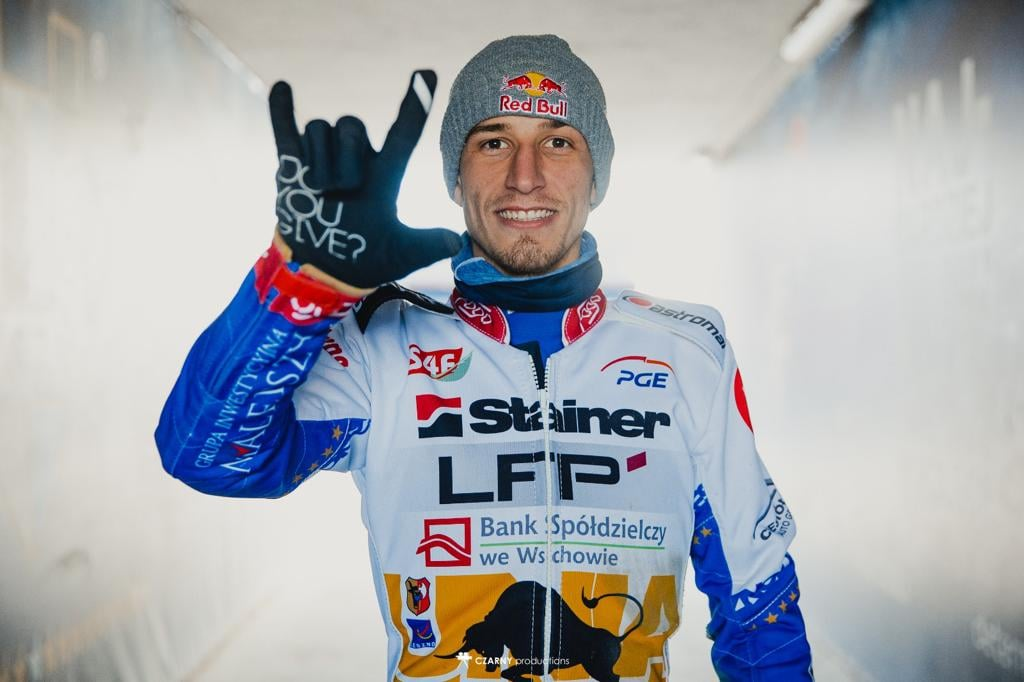
- Born: 30 November 1994 (age 31); Leszno, Poland
- Nickname: Piter
- Nationality: Polish

Career history

Poland
- 2011: Piła
- 2011–2022, 2026: Leszno
- 2023: Wrocław
- 2024: Zielona Góra
- 2025: Częstochowa

Great Britain
- 2011: Coventry
- 2012: Poole
- 2014: Wolverhampton
- 2024: Birmingham

Sweden
- 2011–2016, 2022–2024: Piraterna
- 2017–2018: Lejonen
- 2019: Dackarna
- 2021: Masarna
- 2026: Rospiggarna

Denmark
- 2010–2012: Holsted
- 2025: Grindsted

Speedway Grand Prix statistics
- SGP number: 777
- Starts: 16 (total)
- Finalist: 2 (total) times
- Winner: 1 times

Individual honours
- 2017: Latvian Grand Prix
- 2014: Individual Speedway Junior World Championship
- 2011: Polish Under-21 Champion

Team honours
- 2016, 2017: Speedway World Cup
- 2024, 2025: European Team Champion
- 2014, 2015: Team Speedway Junior World Championship

Piotr Pawlicki (born 30 November 1994) is a Polish speedway rider.

== Career ==
Born in Leszno, Pawlicki is the son of former rider Piotr Pawlicki Sr. and the younger brother of Przemysław Pawlicki. He won the Polish Under-21 Championship in 2011, emulating his father and also competed in the World Under-21 Championship. He rode for his hometown team Unia Leszno in the Speedway Ekstraliga and also for Piła in the Polish second division. In August 2011, he was signed by Coventry Bees and rode for them in the Elite League. He was a reserve at the 2011 Polish Speedway Grand Prix at Toruń. His 2011 season was ended by a broken wrist sustained while racing in Poland in October.

In 2012, Pawlicki rode for Poole Pirates as a temporary replacement for the injured Dennis Andersson, coming in on an assessed average of 4.00. Poole wanted him to return in 2013 but decided against signing him after he was given a higher assessed average of 7.00 by the BSPA's independent arbitrator. On 4 October 2014, he was crowned as the 2014 U21-Worldchampion in Pardubice, leading the Junior Worldchampionship after three events in Lonigo, Ostrow and Pardubice. For 2015, he was nominated as one of the three Speedway-GP Reserves for the SGP 2015.

Pawlicki competed in the Speedway Grand Prix wearing the number 777 during 2016 and 2017 as a permanent rider. In 2016, he finished in sixth place after 18 heat wins, and made one Grand Prix final. In 2017, finished 11th with 81 points and won the 2017 Speedway Grand Prix of Latvia. The years of 2016 and 2017 were breakthrough years for Pawlicki and he recorded his best results to date after winning the Speedway World Cup with Poland in both 2016 and 2017. In the 2016 semi final, Pawlicki was the top scorer for Poland and for the final in Great Britain the current captain Maciej Janowski was dropped and Piotr, at only 21, was the new captain. He raced Poland to victory beating Great Britain for the title. In 2017, he was back on the Polish team alongside fellow grand prix riders: captain Maciej Janowski, Bartosz Zmarzlik, and Patryk Dudek. Where they won and were back to back champions beating team Sweden in Leszno, Poland.

In 2023, Pawlicki signed for Piraterna in the Swedish Elitserien (he first rode for the club in 2011). Pawlicki returned to British speedway in 2024, after signing for Birmingham Brummies.

In 2024, Pawlicki won the European Team Speedway Championship.
