= Nick Škorja =

Slovenian speedway rider

- Born: July 28, 1998 (age 28); Laško, Slovenia
- Nationality: Slovenian

Career history

Slovenia
- 2022: AMD Krško

Poland
- 2019: Wilki Krosno
- 2021: Landshut Devils
- 2022: Wrocław U24

Individual honours
- 2016, 2017 2020, 2022: Slovenian national runner-up

Nick Škorja (born 28 July 1998) is a Slovenian motorcycle speedway rider.

== Career ==
Škorja appeared twice as a track reserve in the 2016 Speedway Grand Prix and once at the 2017 Speedway Grand Prix and 2018 Speedway Grand Prix. He has finished runner-up in the Slovenian Individual Speedway Championship in 2016, 2017, 2020 and 2022. He reached the finals of both the 2018 Speedway Under-21 World Championship and 2019 Speedway Under-21 World Championship.

In 2019, Škorja was selected for the Slovenian team for the 2019 Speedway of Nations. He would have made his British league debut for Newcastle Diamonds in 2020 but the season was cancelled due to the COVID-19 pandemic. The following season he signed for Landshut Devils in the Polish league. He rode for AMD Krško in 2022.

Škorja has represented Slovenia in both the 2021 Speedway of Nations and 2022 Speedway of Nations.

== Major results ==
=== World individual Championship ===
- 2016 Speedway Grand Prix - 26th (12 pts)
- 2017 Speedway Grand Prix - 37th (1 pt)
- 2018 Speedway Grand Prix - 36th (0 pt)
- 2023 Speedway Grand Prix - =31st (0 pt)

=== World team Championships ===
- 2018 Speedway of Nations - =7th
- 2019 Speedway of Nations - =8th
- 2021 Speedway of Nations - =11th
- 2022 Speedway of Nations - =9th

== See also ==
- Slovenia national speedway team
