= Patryk Dudek =

Polish speedway rider (born 1992)

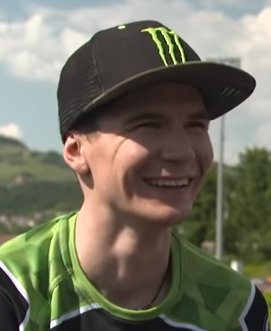
- Dudek in 2019
- Born: 20 June 1992 (age 34); Bydgoszcz, Poland

Career history

Poland
- 2009–2021: Zielona Góra
- 2022–2026: Toruń

Sweden
- 2010–2011: Ornarna
- 2012–2014, 2016–2019: Dackarna
- 2015: Piraterna
- 2021: Rospiggarna
- 2022: Lejonen
- 2024–2025: Indianerna

Denmark
- 2010: Brovst
- 2012–2013, 2016: Esbjerg
- 2024–2026: Slangerup

Speedway Grand Prix statistics
- SGP number: 692
- Starts: 72
- Finalist: 22 times
- Winner: 3 times

Individual honours
- 2017: World Championship runner-up
- 2025: European Champion
- 2016, 2025: Polish Champion
- 2016: Golden Helmet Winner
- 2009: U-21 Polish Champion
- 2010: U-19 Bronze Helmet Winner
- 2016: GP Challenge winner
- 2018: Ekstraliga Riders’ Championship
- 2021: Golden Helmet of Pardubice

Team honours
- 2013, 2016, 2017, 2023: World team champion
- 2022, 2024, 2025: European Team champion
- 2009, 2010: Team U-19 European Champion
- 2009, 2011, 2013, 2025, 2026: Polish champion
- 2024, 2025: Danish league champion

Patryk Dudek ([ˈpatrɨk ˈdudɛk]; born 20 June 1992) is a Polish motorcycle speedway rider who is a member of the Polish national speedway team.

== Career ==
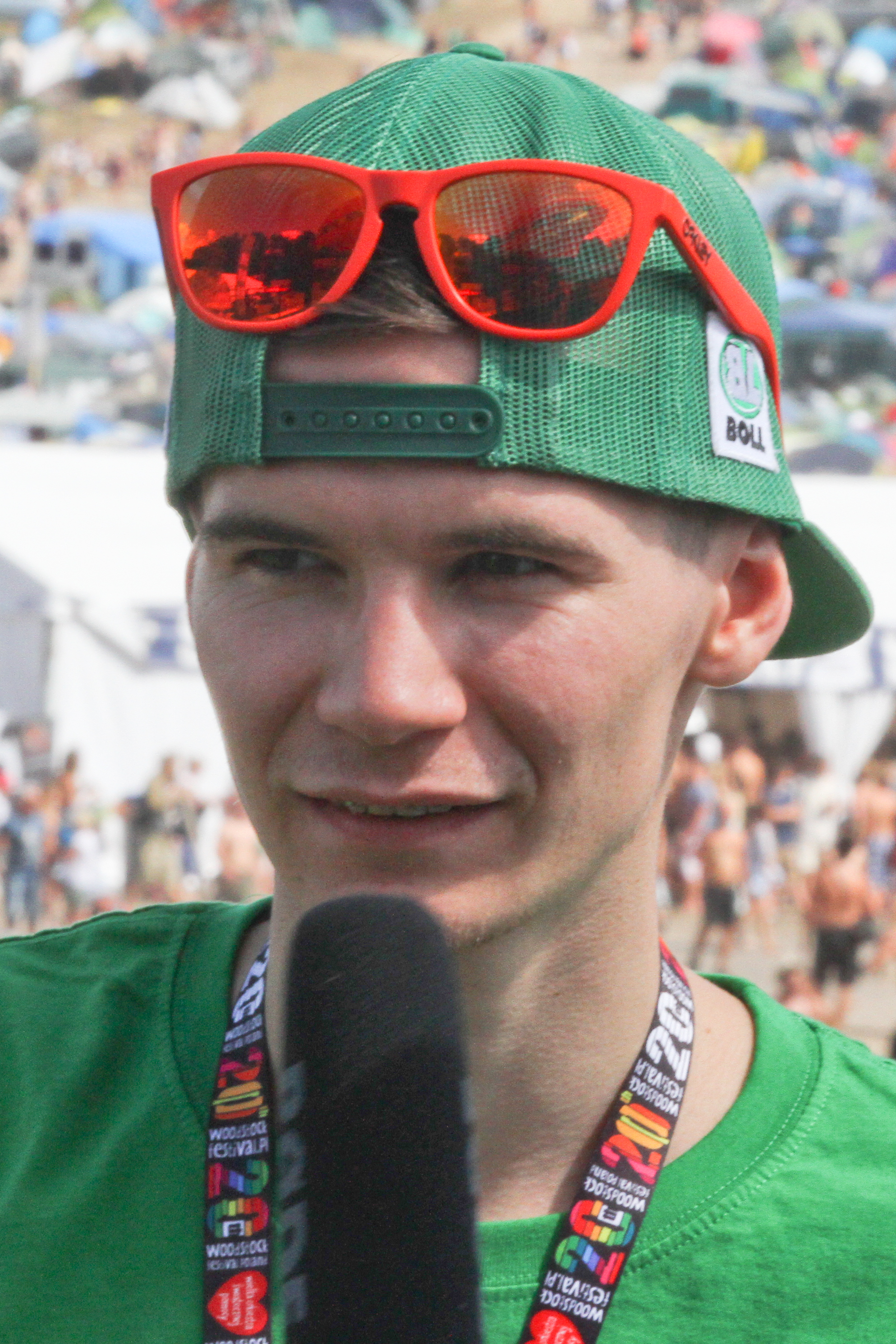
Dudek in 2014

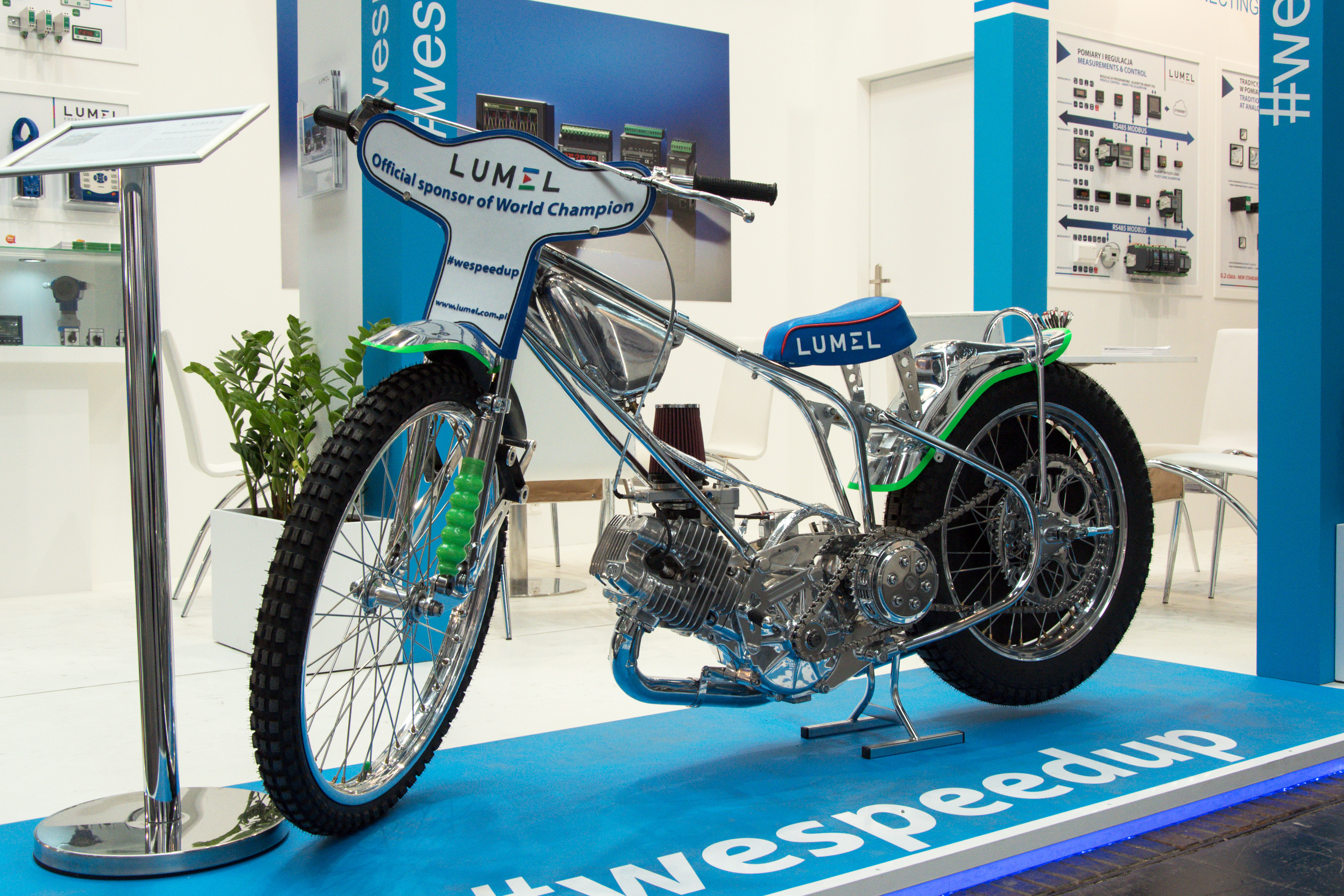
Speedway motorcycle from Patryk Dudek (2017)

Dudek's father, Sławomir, was a professional rider and Patryk gained his speedway licence in 2008. Dudek won 2009 and 2010 Team U-19 European Champion and 2009 Individual Under-21 Polish Champion titles.

In June 2014, Dudek tested positive for a banned substance following a Polish league match against Stal Gorzów. He was subsequently issued a 12-month ban by the FIM from all international speedway competitions, starting that August. The substance was later revealed to be Methylhexanamine, a drug commonly used as a dietary supplement. He returned to competition once his ban was lifted in August 2015.

In September 2016, during the Speedway Grand Prix Qualification, he won the GP Challenge, which ensured that he claimed a permanent slot for the 2017 Speedway Grand Prix. In 2017, he won the silver medal during the 2017 Speedway Grand Prix, having accomplished this during his debut season in the Speedway Grand Prix series, which makes him the most successful SGP rookie ever.

Expectations for the 2018 season were high based on his status as world number 2 but he struggled to repeat the success and finished a ninth in the 2018 Speedway Grand Prix. He did however win the 2018 Speedway Grand Prix of Slovenia and secured a permanent slot for the 2019 Speedway Grand Prix, where he finished eighth.

After finishing 12th during the 2020 Speedway Grand Prix season, Dudek suffered a leg injury, which resulted in him missing the 2021 season. In 2022, he finished in seventh place during the 2022 Speedway World Championship, after securing 102 points during the 2022 Speedway Grand Prix season, which included winning the German Grand Prix. Also in 2022, he was a member of the Polish team that won the inaugural European Team Speedway Championship.

In July 2023, Dudek was part of the Polish team that won the gold medal in the 2023 Speedway World Cup final. However, his World Championship campaign was inconsistent and he finished in tenth place.

In 2024, Dudek won the European Team Speedway Championship and helped Slangerup win the Danish Speedway League during the 2024 Danish speedway season.

Dudek became Polish champion for the second time during the 2025 Polish speedway season having previously won the title in 2016. During the 2025 Danish speedway season he helped Slangerup retain the Speedway Ligaen title.

== Major results ==
=== World individual Championship ===
- 2016 Speedway Grand Prix – 17th (8 pts)
- 2017 Speedway Grand Prix – 2nd (143 pts)
- 2018 Speedway Grand Prix – 9th (84 pts)
- 2019 Speedway Grand Prix – 8th (79 pts)
- 2020 Speedway Grand Prix – 12th (39 pts)
- 2022 Speedway Grand Prix – 7th (102 pts)
- 2023 Speedway Grand Prix – 10th (76 pts)
- 2024 Speedway Grand Prix – 17th (24 pts)
- 2025 Speedway Grand Prix – 18th (16 pts)
- 2026 Speedway Grand Prix – 5th (103 pts)

=== Grand Prix wins ===
- 1: 2017 Speedway Grand Prix of Poland (Toruń)
- 2: 2018 Speedway Grand Prix of Slovenia
- 3: 2022 Speedway Grand Prix of Germany

=== World team Championships ===
- 2013 Speedway World Cup – Champion
- 2016 Speedway World Cup – Champion
- 2017 Speedway World Cup – Champion
- 2018 Speedway of Nations – 3rd
- 2019 Speedway of Nations – 2nd
- 2022 Speedway of Nations – 6th
- 2023 Speedway World Cup – Champion
- 2024 Speedway of Nations – 5th
- 2025 Speedway of Nations – 2nd
- 2026 Speedway World Cup – 3rd

=== European Championships ===
- Individual U-19 European Championship
  - 2009 – Poland Tarnów – 5th place (10 pts)
  - 2010 – Croatia Goričan – 3rd placed (14+1 pts)
- Team U-19 European Championship
  - 2009 – Denmark Holsted – U-19 European Champion (2 pts)
  - 2010 – Czech Republic Divišov – U-19 European Champion (15 pts)

=== Domestic competitions ===
- Team Polish Championship (League)
  - 2009 – for Zielona Góra
- Individual U-21 Polish Championship
  - 2009 – Poland Leszno – U-21 Polish Champion (13 pts + 1st in Run-Off)
- Team U-21 Polish Championship
  - 2009 – Poland Wrocław – Runner-up (13 pts + 1st in Run-Off)
  - 2010 – Poland Leszno – Winner (15 pts)

== See also ==
- Poland national speedway team
