= 2018 Speedway Grand Prix of Slovenia =

Speedway world championship event

- 2018 Aztorin Slovenian FIM Speedway Grand Prix

Information
- Date: 7 September 2018
- City: (Slovenia) Krško
- Event: 8 of 10
- Referee: Artur Kusmierz

Stadium details
- Stadium: Matija Gubec Stadium
- Capacity: 12,000
- Length: 387.7 m (424.0 yd)

SGP Results
- Best Time
- (gold) Winner: (Poland) Patryk Dudek
- (silver) Runner-up: (Australia) Jason Doyle
- (bronze) 3rd place: (United States) Greg Hancock

The 2018 Aztorin Slovenian FIM Speedway Grand Prix was the eighth race of the 2018 Speedway Grand Prix season. It took place on September 7 at the Matija Gubec Stadium in Krško, Slovenia.

== Riders ==
First reserve Niels-Kristian Iversen replaced the injured Matej Žagar. The Speedway Grand Prix Commission also nominated Matic Ivačič as the wild card, and Nick Škorja and Denis Štojs both as Track Reserves.

== Results ==
The Grand Prix was won by Patryk Dudek, who beat defending world champion Jason Doyle, Greg Hancock and Fredrik Lindgren in the final. It was the second Grand Prix win of Dudek's career. Overall leader Tai Woffinden finished 14th, scoring just five points, while his nearest challenger Bartosz Zmarzlik scored 12 points on the way to reaching the semi-finals. As a result, Zmarzlik closed the gap at the top of the world championship standings to just nine points.

=== Heat details ===
Placing	Draw	Rider	Total	1	2	3	4	5	6	7	8	9	10	11	12	13	14	15	16	17	18	19	20	Pts	Pos	21	22	23
Gold	14	(Poland) (692) Patryk Dudek	16				1		3					1		2							3	10	5		3	3
Silver	7	(Australia) (69) Jason Doyle	17		2					3					2	3					3			13	1	2		2
Bronze	9	(United States) (45) Greg Hancock	15			3		1						3					3		2			12	2		2	1
4	1	(Sweden) (66) Fredrik Lindgren	13	3				2				1				1				3				10	6	3		0
5	15	(Poland) (95) Bartosz Zmarzlik	12				2			2			3						2	2				11	3		1
6	6	(Poland) (71) Maciej Janowski	10		0				2			3							1			3		9	7	1
7	16	(Australia) (23) Chris Holder	10				3				1	2						3			1			10	4	0
8	12	(Slovakia) (54) Martin Vaculík	9			2					3		2			0						2		9	8		0
9	13	(Russia) (222) Artem Laguta	7				0	3							3		0					1		7	9
10	3	(Denmark) (110) Nicki Pedersen	7	2						1				2				2				0		7	10
11	5	(Denmark) (88) Niels-Kristian Iversen	5		3			0					1					1					0	5	11
12	8	(Russia) (89) Emil Sayfutdinov	5		1						0			0			3			1				5	12
13	11	(United Kingdom) (111) Craig Cook	5			1				0		0					2						2	5	13
14	4	(United Kingdom) (108) Tai Woffinden	5	1							2				1				0				1	5	14
15	2	(Poland) (59) Przemysław Pawlicki	2	0					1				0				1				0			2	15
16	10	(Slovenia) (16) Matic Ivačič	0			0			0						0			0		0				0	16
17	17	(Slovenia) (17) Nick Škorja	0																					0	17
Placing	Draw	Rider	Total	1	2	3	4	5	6	7	8	9	10	11	12	13	14	15	16	17	18	19	20	Pts	Pos	21	22	23

e: retired or mechanical failure • m: exclusion for exceeding two minute time allowance • t: exclusion for touching the tapes • x: other exclusion • f: fell
ns: non-starter • nc: non-classify
Semi-finals: Heat 21: Riders placed 1st, 4th, 6th & 7th in the intermediate classification (after 20 heats)
Heat 22: Riders placed 2nd, 3rd, 5th & 8th in the intermediate classification (after 20 heats)
Big Final (heat 23): The first and second placed riders in each of the Semi-Finals

gate A – inside	gate B	gate C	gate D – outside

== Intermediate classification ==
Qualifies for next season's Grand Prix series
Full-time Grand Prix rider
Wild card, track reserve or qualified reserve

Pos.	Rider	Points	POL (Poland)	CZE (Czech Republic)	DEN (Denmark)	SWE (Sweden)	GBR (United Kingdom)	SCA (Sweden)	PL2 (Poland)	SVN (Slovenia)	GER (Germany)	PL3 (Poland)
Gold	(United Kingdom) (108) Tai Woffinden	108	15	16	18	16	16	10	12	5	–	–
Silver	(Poland) (95) Bartosz Zmarzlik	99	9	4	10	13	19	14	18	12	–	–
Bronze	(Poland) (71) Maciej Janowski	89	13	11	5	18	12	11	9	10	–	–
4	(Sweden) (66) Fredrik Lindgren	89	16	16	7	15	7	13	2	13	–	–
5	(Poland) (692) Patryk Dudek	84	10	14	6	6	10	10	12	16	–	–
6	(United States) (45) Greg Hancock	81	8	7	16	10	12	3	10	15	–	–
7	(Russia) (222) Artem Laguta	73	13	8	12	8	6	6	13	7	–	–
8	(Australia) (69) Jason Doyle	70	5	9	12	9	5	4	9	17	–	–
9	(Russia) (89) Emil Sayfutdinov	70	8	15	11	14	8	6	3	5	–	–
10	(Slovenia) (55) Matej Žagar	61	9	7	5	7	6	16	11	–	–	–
11	(Denmark) (110) Nicki Pedersen	59	2	8	12	3	6	15	6	7	–	–
12	(Australia) (23) Chris Holder	53	10	5	9	7	7	5	0	10	–	–
13	(Slovakia) (54) Martin Vaculík	44	–	–	3	1	3	10	18	9	–	–
14	(Poland) (59) Przemysław Pawlicki	32	3	5	5	1	10	3	3	2	–	–
15	(United Kingdom) (111) Craig Cook	30	2	2	2	3	9	3	4	5	–	–
16	(Denmark) (88) Niels-Kristian Iversen	14	4	5	–	–	–	–	–	5	–	–
17	(Poland) (16) Szymon Woźniak	8	–	–	–	–	–	–	8	–	–	–
18	(Poland) (16) Krzysztof Kasprzak	7	7	–	–	–	–	–	–	–	–	–
19	(Sweden) (16) Andreas Jonsson	7	–	–	–	7	–	–	–	–	–	–
20	(Czech Republic) (16) Vaclav Milik	6	–	6	–	–	–	–	–	–	–	–
21	(Sweden) (16) Peter Ljung	5	–	–	–	–	–	5	–	–	–	–
22	(Denmark) (16) Michael Jepsen Jensen	4	–	–	4	–	–	–	–	–	–	–
23	(Sweden) (17) Oliver Berntzon	3	–	–	–	–	–	3	–	–	–	–
24	(Poland) (17) Maksym Drabik	2	2	–	–	–	–	–	–	–	–	–
25	(Poland) (18) Bartosz Smektała	2	2	–	–	–	–	–	–	–	–	–
26	(Denmark) (17) Mikkel Michelsen	1	–	–	1	–	–	–	–	–	–	–
27	(United Kingdom) (16) Robert Lambert	1	–	–	–	–	1	–	–	–	–	–
28	(Sweden) (18) Joel Kling	1	–	–	–	–	–	1	–	–	–	–
29	(Denmark) (18) Mikkel Bech Jensen	0	–	–	0	–	–	–	–	–	–	–
30	(United Kingdom) (17) Daniel Bewley	0	–	–	–	–	0	–	–	–	–	–
31	(Slovenia) (16) Matic Ivačič	0	–	–	–	–	–	–	–	0	–	–
32	(Slovenia) (17) Nick Škorja	0	–	–	–	–	–	–	–	0	–	–
Pos.	Rider	Points	POL (Poland)	CZE (Czech Republic)	DEN (Denmark)	SWE (Sweden)	GBR (United Kingdom)	SCA (Sweden)	PL2 (Poland)	SVN (Slovenia)	GER (Germany)	PL3 (Poland)
