= 2018 Speedway Grand Prix of Scandinavia =

Grand Prix

(Sweden) 2018 Speedway Grand Prix of Scandinavia
- 2018 Betard Scandinavian FIM Speedway Grand Prix

Information
- Date: 11 August 2018
- City: (Sweden) Målilla
- Event: 6 of 10
- Referee: (United Kingdom) Craig Ackroyd

Stadium details
- Stadium: G&B Arena
- Capacity: 15,000
- Length: 305 m (334 yd)

SGP Results
- Best Time
- (gold) Winner: (Denmark) Nicki Pedersen
- (silver) Runner-up: (Slovenia) Matej Žagar
- (bronze) 3rd place: (Sweden) Fredrik Lindgren

The 2018 Betard Scandinavian FIM Speedway Grand Prix was the sixth race of the 2018 Speedway Grand Prix season. It took place on August 11 at the G&B Arena in Målilla, Sweden.

== Riders ==
The Speedway Grand Prix Commission nominated Peter Ljung as the wild card, and Oliver Berntzon and Joel Kling both as Track Reserves.

== Results ==
The Grand Prix was won by Nicki Pedersen, who beat Matej Žagar, Fredrik Lindgren and Martin Vaculík in the final. Bartosz Zmarzlik has initially top scored in the qualifying heats, but was excluded in the semi-finals. Overall Tai Woffinden retained his world championship lead, however Lindgren cut the deficit to 17 points.

=== Heat details ===
Placing	Draw	Rider	Total	1	2	3	4	5	6	7	8	9	10	11	12	13	14	15	16	17	18	19	20	Pts	Pos	21	22	23
Gold	16	(Denmark) (110) Nicki Pedersen	15				2				2	2						3			1			10	4	2		3
Silver	12	(Slovenia) (55) Matej Žagar	16			3					1		3			3						1		11	3		3	2
Bronze	7	(Sweden) (66) Fredrik Lindgren	13		2					2					1	2					2			9	7	3		1
4	8	(Slovakia) (54) Martin Vaculík	10		3						0			3			0			2				8	8		2	0
5	13	(Poland) (95) Bartosz Zmarzlik	14				3	3							3		3					2		14	1	0
6	4	(Poland) (71) Maciej Janowski	11	3							3				2				0				3	11	2		0
7	10	(Poland) (692) Patryk Dudek	10			2			3						0			1		3				9	5		1
8	11	(United Kingdom) (108) Tai Woffinden	10			1				3		3					0						2	9	6	1
9	9	(Russia) (222) Artem Laguta	6			0		1						2					3		0			6	9
10	5	(Russia) (89) Emil Sayfutdinov	6		1			2					2					0					1	6	10
11	3	(Sweden) (16) Peter Ljung	5	0						0				0				2				3		5	11
12	6	(Australia) (23) Chris Holder	5		0				2			1							2			0		5	12
13	2	(Australia) (69) Jason Doyle	4	2					0				1				1				0			4	13
14	1	(United Kingdom) (111) Craig Cook	3	1				0				0				0				2				3	14
15	15	(Poland) (59) Przemysław Pawlicki	3				1			1			0						0	1				3	15
16	14	(United States) (45) Greg Hancock	3				0		1					1		1							0	3	16
17	17	(Sweden) (17) Oliver Berntzon	3																					3	17
18	18	(Sweden) (18) Joel Kling	1																					1	18
Placing	Draw	Rider	Total	1	2	3	4	5	6	7	8	9	10	11	12	13	14	15	16	17	18	19	20	Pts	Pos	21	22	23

e: retired or mechanical failure • m: exclusion for exceeding two minute time allowance • t: exclusion for touching the tapes • x: other exclusion • f: fell
ns: non-starter • nc: non-classify
Semi-finals: Heat 21: Riders placed 1st, 4th, 6th & 7th in the intermediate classification (after 20 heats)
Heat 22: Riders placed 2nd, 3rd, 5th & 8th in the intermediate classification (after 20 heats)
Big Final (heat 23): The first and second placed riders in each of the Semi-Finals

gate A – inside	gate B	gate C	gate D – outside

== Intermediate classification ==
Qualifies for next season's Grand Prix series
Full-time Grand Prix rider
Wild card, track reserve or qualified reserve

Pos.	Rider	Points	POL (Poland)	CZE (Czech Republic)	DEN (Denmark)	SWE (Sweden)	GBR (United Kingdom)	SCA (Sweden)	PL2 (Poland)	SVN (Slovenia)	GER (Germany)	PL3 (Poland)
Gold	(United Kingdom) (108) Tai Woffinden	91	15	16	18	16	16	10	–	–	–	–
Silver	(Sweden) (66) Fredrik Lindgren	74	16	16	7	15	7	13	–	–	–	–
Bronze	(Poland) (71) Maciej Janowski	70	13	11	5	18	12	11	–	–	–	–
4	(Poland) (95) Bartosz Zmarzlik	69	9	4	10	13	19	14	–	–	–	–
5	(Russia) (89) Emil Sayfutdinov	62	8	15	11	14	8	6	–	–	–	–
6	(Poland) (692) Patryk Dudek	56	10	14	6	6	10	10	–	–	–	–
7	(United States) (45) Greg Hancock	56	8	7	16	10	12	3	–	–	–	–
8	(Russia) (222) Artem Laguta	53	13	8	12	8	6	6	–	–	–	–
9	(Slovenia) (55) Matej Žagar	50	9	7	5	7	6	16	–	–	–	–
10	(Denmark) (110) Nicki Pedersen	46	2	8	12	3	6	15	–	–	–	–
11	(Australia) (69) Jason Doyle	44	5	9	12	9	5	4	–	–	–	–
12	(Australia) (23) Chris Holder	43	10	5	9	7	7	5	–	–	–	–
13	(Poland) (59) Przemysław Pawlicki	27	3	5	5	1	10	3	–	–	–	–
14	(United Kingdom) (111) Craig Cook	21	2	2	2	3	9	3	–	–	–	–
15	(Slovakia) (54) Martin Vaculík	17	–	–	3	1	3	10	–	–	–	–
16	(Denmark) (88) Niels-Kristian Iversen	9	4	5	–	–	–	–	–	–	–	–
17	(Poland) (16) Krzysztof Kasprzak	7	7	–	–	–	–	–	–	–	–	–
18	(Sweden) (16) Andreas Jonsson	7	–	–	–	7	–	–	–	–	–	–
19	(Czech Republic) (16) Vaclav Milik	6	–	6	–	–	–	–	–	–	–	–
20	(Sweden) (16) Peter Ljung	5	–	–	–	–	–	5	–	–	–	–
21	(Denmark) (16) Michael Jepsen Jensen	4	–	–	4	–	–	–	–	–	–	–
22	(Sweden) (17) Oliver Berntzon	3	–	–	–	–	–	3	–	–	–	–
23	(Poland) (17) Maksym Drabik	2	2	–	–	–	–	–	–	–	–	–
24	(Poland) (18) Bartosz Smektała	2	2	–	–	–	–	–	–	–	–	–
25	(Denmark) (17) Mikkel Michelsen	1	–	–	1	–	–	–	–	–	–	–
26	(United Kingdom) (16) Robert Lambert	1	–	–	–	–	1	–	–	–	–	–
27	(Sweden) (18) Joel Kling	1	–	–	–	–	–	1	–	–	–	–
28	(Denmark) (18) Mikkel Bech Jensen	0	–	–	0	–	–	–	–	–	–	–
29	(United Kingdom) (17) Daniel Bewley	0	–	–	–	–	0	–	–	–	–	–
Pos.	Rider	Points	POL (Poland)	CZE (Czech Republic)	DEN (Denmark)	SWE (Sweden)	GBR (United Kingdom)	SCA (Sweden)	PL2 (Poland)	SVN (Slovenia)	GER (Germany)	PL3 (Poland)
