= 2018 Speedway Grand Prix of Poland II =

Motorsport event

- 2018 MIB Nordic Gorzów FIM Speedway Grand Prix of Poland

Information
- Date: 25 August 2018
- City: (Poland) Gorzów
- Event: 7 of 10
- Referee: (Sweden) Krister Gardell

Stadium details
- Stadium: Edward Jancarz Stadium
- Capacity: 17,000
- Length: 329 m (360 yd)

SGP Results
- Best Time
- (gold) Winner: (Slovakia) Martin Vaculík
- (silver) Runner-up: (Poland) Bartosz Zmarzlik
- (bronze) 3rd place: (United Kingdom) Tai Woffinden

The 2018 MIB Nordic Gorzów FIM Speedway Grand Prix of Poland was the seventh race of the 2018 Speedway Grand Prix season. It took place on August 25 at the Edward Jancarz Stadium in Gorzów, Poland.

== Riders ==
The Speedway Grand Prix Commission nominated Szymon Woźniak as the wild card, and Wiktor Lampart and Rafał Karczmarz both as Track Reserves.

== Results ==
The Grand Prix was won by Martin Vaculík, who beat Bartosz Zmarzlik, Tai Woffinden and Patryk Dudek in the final. Overall Zmarzlik moved into second place in the standings, cutting Woffinden's world championship lead to 16 points. Fredrik Lindgren dropped to fourth overall, below Janowski in third, after picking up just two points.

=== Heat details ===
Placing	Draw	Rider	Total	1	2	3	4	5	6	7	8	9	10	11	12	13	14	15	16	17	18	19	20	Pts	Pos	21	22	23
Gold	9	(Slovakia) (54) Martin Vaculík	18			1		3						3					3		2			12	2		3	3
Silver	16	(Poland) (95) Bartosz Zmarzlik	18				3				3	1						3			3			13	1	3		2
Bronze	1	(United Kingdom) (108) Tai Woffinden	12	2				1				2				2				2				9	8		2	1
4	13	(Poland) (692) Patryk Dudek	12				1	2							3		1					3		10	6	2		0
5	2	(Russia) (222) Artem Laguta	13	3					3				3				2				1			12	3		1
6	7	(Slovenia) (55) Matej Žagar	11		3					1					3	3					0			10	4	1
7	8	(United States) (45) Greg Hancock	10		1						2			1			3			3				10	5		0
8	6	(Poland) (71) Maciej Janowski	9		2				1			3							2			1		9	7	0
9	10	(Australia) (69) Jason Doyle	9			2			2						2			2		1				9	9
10	12	(Poland) (16) Szymon Woźniak	8			3					1		2			0						2		8	10
11	15	(Denmark) (110) Nicki Pedersen	6				2			2			1						1	0				6	11
12	5	(United Kingdom) (111) Craig Cook	4		0			0					0					1					3	4	12
13	4	(Poland) (59) Przemysław Pawlicki	3	1							0				0				0				2	3	13
14	3	(Russia) (89) Emil Sayfutdinov	3	0						1				2				0				0		3	14
15	14	(Sweden) (66) Fredrik Lindgren	2				0		0					0		1							1	2	15
16	11	(Australia) (23) Chris Holder	0			0				0		0					0						0	0	16
Placing	Draw	Rider	Total	1	2	3	4	5	6	7	8	9	10	11	12	13	14	15	16	17	18	19	20	Pts	Pos	21	22	23

e: retired or mechanical failure • m: exclusion for exceeding two minute time allowance • t: exclusion for touching the tapes • x: other exclusion • f: fell
ns: non-starter • nc: non-classify
Semi-finals: Heat 21: Riders placed 1st, 4th, 6th & 7th in the intermediate classification (after 20 heats)
Heat 22: Riders placed 2nd, 3rd, 5th & 8th in the intermediate classification (after 20 heats)
Big Final (heat 23): The first and second placed riders in each of the Semi-Finals

gate A – inside	gate B	gate C	gate D – outside

== Intermediate classification ==
Qualifies for next season's Grand Prix series
Full-time Grand Prix rider
Wild card, track reserve or qualified reserve

Pos.	Rider	Points	POL (Poland)	CZE (Czech Republic)	DEN (Denmark)	SWE (Sweden)	GBR (United Kingdom)	SCA (Sweden)	PL2 (Poland)	SVN (Slovenia)	GER (Germany)	PL3 (Poland)
Gold	(United Kingdom) (108) Tai Woffinden	103	15	16	18	16	16	10	12	–	–	–
Silver	(Poland) (95) Bartosz Zmarzlik	87	9	4	10	13	19	14	18	–	–	–
Bronze	(Poland) (71) Maciej Janowski	79	13	11	5	18	12	11	9	–	–	–
4	(Sweden) (66) Fredrik Lindgren	76	16	16	7	15	7	13	2	–	–	–
5	(Poland) (692) Patryk Dudek	68	10	14	6	6	10	10	12	–	–	–
6	(United States) (45) Greg Hancock	66	8	7	16	10	12	3	10	–	–	–
7	(Russia) (222) Artem Laguta	66	13	8	12	8	6	6	13	–	–	–
8	(Russia) (89) Emil Sayfutdinov	65	8	15	11	14	8	6	3	–	–	–
9	(Slovenia) (55) Matej Žagar	61	9	7	5	7	6	16	11	–	–	–
10	(Australia) (69) Jason Doyle	53	5	9	12	9	5	4	9	–	–	–
11	(Denmark) (110) Nicki Pedersen	52	2	8	12	3	6	15	6	–	–	–
12	(Australia) (23) Chris Holder	43	10	5	9	7	7	5	0	–	–	–
13	(Slovakia) (54) Martin Vaculík	35	–	–	3	1	3	10	18	–	–	–
14	(Poland) (59) Przemysław Pawlicki	30	3	5	5	1	10	3	3	–	–	–
15	(United Kingdom) (111) Craig Cook	25	2	2	2	3	9	3	4	–	–	–
16	(Denmark) (88) Niels-Kristian Iversen	9	4	5	–	–	–	–	–	–	–	–
17	(Poland) (16) Szymon Woźniak	8	–	–	–	–	–	–	8	–	–	–
18	(Poland) (16) Krzysztof Kasprzak	7	7	–	–	–	–	–	–	–	–	–
19	(Sweden) (16) Andreas Jonsson	7	–	–	–	7	–	–	–	–	–	–
20	(Czech Republic) (16) Vaclav Milik	6	–	6	–	–	–	–	–	–	–	–
21	(Sweden) (16) Peter Ljung	5	–	–	–	–	–	5	–	–	–	–
22	(Denmark) (16) Michael Jepsen Jensen	4	–	–	4	–	–	–	–	–	–	–
23	(Sweden) (17) Oliver Berntzon	3	–	–	–	–	–	3	–	–	–	–
24	(Poland) (17) Maksym Drabik	2	2	–	–	–	–	–	–	–	–	–
25	(Poland) (18) Bartosz Smektała	2	2	–	–	–	–	–	–	–	–	–
26	(Denmark) (17) Mikkel Michelsen	1	–	–	1	–	–	–	–	–	–	–
27	(United Kingdom) (16) Robert Lambert	1	–	–	–	–	1	–	–	–	–	–
28	(Sweden) (18) Joel Kling	1	–	–	–	–	–	1	–	–	–	–
29	(Denmark) (18) Mikkel Bech Jensen	0	–	–	0	–	–	–	–	–	–	–
30	(United Kingdom) (17) Daniel Bewley	0	–	–	–	–	0	–	–	–	–	–
Pos.	Rider	Points	POL (Poland)	CZE (Czech Republic)	DEN (Denmark)	SWE (Sweden)	GBR (United Kingdom)	SCA (Sweden)	PL2 (Poland)	SVN (Slovenia)	GER (Germany)	PL3 (Poland)
