= 2018 Speedway Grand Prix of Poland =

- 2018 BOLL Warsaw FIM Speedway Grand Prix of Poland

Information
- Date: 12 May 2018
- City: (Poland) Warsaw
- Event: 1 of 10
- Referee: (Denmark) Jesper Steentoft

Stadium details
- Stadium: Stadion Narodowy
- Capacity: 54,000
- Length: 274.2 m (299.9 yd)

SGP Results
- Best Time
- (gold) Winner: (United Kingdom) Tai Woffinden
- (silver) Runner-up: (Poland) Maciej Janowski
- (bronze) 3rd place: (Sweden) Fredrik Lindgren

The 2018 BOLL Warsaw FIM Speedway Grand Prix of Poland was the first race of the 2018 Speedway Grand Prix season. It took place on May 12 at the Stadion Narodowy in Warsaw, Poland.

== Riders ==
The Speedway Grand Prix Commission nominated Krzysztof Kasprzak as the wild card, and Maksym Drabik and Bartosz Smektała both as Track Reserves.

== Results ==
The Grand Prix was won by Tai Woffinden, who beat Maciej Janowski, Fredrik Lindgren and Artem Laguta in the final. It was the eighth Grand Prix win of Woffinden's career, taking him level with Leigh Adams in seventh on the all-time list.

Lindgren had initially top scored with 12 points during the qualifying heats, and despite finishing third in the final, he topped the overall standings with 16 points, one ahead of Woffinden.

=== Heat details ===
Placing	Draw	Rider	Total	1	2	3	4	5	6	7	8	9	10	11	12	13	14	15	16	17	18	19	20	Pts	Pos	21	22	23
Gold	3	(United Kingdom) (108) Tai Woffinden	15	2						0				2				3				3		10	3		2	3
Silver	6	(Poland) (71) Maciej Janowski	13		1				2			2							3			1		9	7	2		2
Bronze	11	(Sweden) (66) Fredrik Lindgren	16			2				3		3					1						3	12	1	3		1
4	10	(Russia) (222) Artem Laguta	13			3			3						3			0		1				10	2		3	0
5	13	(Australia) (23) Chris Holder	10				2	2							2		3					0		9	6	1
6	7	(Poland) (692) Patryk Dudek	10		2					2					1	2					3			10	4	0
7	1	(Slovenia) (55) Matej Žagar	9	3				0				0				3				3				9	5		0
8	14	(Poland) (95) Bartosz Zmarzlik	9				3		1					3		0							1	8	8		1
9	15	(Russia) (89) Emil Sayfutdinov	8				0			1			3						2	2				8	9
10	12	(United States) (45) Greg Hancock	8			0					3		2			1						2		8	10
11	5	(Poland) (16) Krzysztof Kasprzak	7		3			3					0					1					0	7	11
12	4	(Australia) (69) Jason Doyle	5	0							2				0				1				2	5	12
13	16	(Denmark) (88) Niels-Kristian Iversen	4				1				0	1						2			0			4	13
14	2	(Poland) (59) Przemysław Pawlicki	3	1					0				1				0				1			3	14
15	8	(United Kingdom) (111) Craig Cook	2		0						1			1			0			0				2	15
16	9	(Denmark) (110) Nicki Pedersen	2			1		1						0					0					2	16
17	17	(Poland) (17) Maksym Drabik	2																					2	17
18	18	(Poland) (18) Bartosz Smektała	2																					2	18
Placing	Draw	Rider	Total	1	2	3	4	5	6	7	8	9	10	11	12	13	14	15	16	17	18	19	20	Pts	Pos	21	22	23

e: retired or mechanical failure • m: exclusion for exceeding two minute time allowance • t: exclusion for touching the tapes • x: other exclusion • f: fell
ns: non-starter • nc: non-classify
Semi-finals: Heat 21: Riders placed 1st, 4th, 6th & 7th in the intermediate classification (after 20 heats)
Heat 22: Riders placed 2nd, 3rd, 5th & 8th in the intermediate classification (after 20 heats)
Big Final (heat 23): The first and second placed riders in each of the Semi-Finals

gate A – inside	gate B	gate C	gate D – outside

== Intermediate classification ==
Qualifies for next season's Grand Prix series
Full-time Grand Prix rider
Wild card, track reserve or qualified reserve

Pos.	Rider	Points	POL (Poland)	CZE (Czech Republic)	DEN (Denmark)	SWE (Sweden)	GBR (United Kingdom)	SCA (Sweden)	PL2 (Poland)	SVN (Slovenia)	GER (Germany)	PL3 (Poland)
Gold	(Sweden) (66) Fredrik Lindgren	16	16	–	–	–	–	–	–	–	–	–
Silver	(United Kingdom) (108) Tai Woffinden	15	15	–	–	–	–	–	–	–	–	–
Bronze	(Poland) (71) Maciej Janowski	13	13	–	–	–	–	–	–	–	–	–
4	(Russia) (222) Artem Laguta	13	13	–	–	–	–	–	–	–	–	–
5	(Australia) (23) Chris Holder	10	10	–	–	–	–	–	–	–	–	–
6	(Poland) (692) Patryk Dudek	10	10	–	–	–	–	–	–	–	–	–
7	(Slovenia) (55) Matej Žagar	9	9	–	–	–	–	–	–	–	–	–
8	(Poland) (95) Bartosz Zmarzlik	9	9	–	–	–	–	–	–	–	–	–
9	(Russia) (89) Emil Sayfutdinov	8	8	–	–	–	–	–	–	–	–	–
10	(United States) (45) Greg Hancock	8	8	–	–	–	–	–	–	–	–	–
11	(Poland) (16) Krzysztof Kasprzak	7	7	–	–	–	–	–	–	–	–	–
12	(Australia) (69) Jason Doyle	5	5	–	–	–	–	–	–	–	–	–
13	(Denmark) (88) Niels-Kristian Iversen	4	4	–	–	–	–	–	–	–	–	–
14	(Poland) (59) Przemysław Pawlicki	3	3	–	–	–	–	–	–	–	–	–
15	(United Kingdom) (111) Craig Cook	2	2	–	–	–	–	–	–	–	–	–
16	(Denmark) (110) Nicki Pedersen	2	2	–	–	–	–	–	–	–	–	–
17	(Poland) (17) Maksym Drabik	2	2	–	–	–	–	–	–	–	–	–
18	(Poland) (18) Bartosz Smektała	2	2	–	–	–	–	–	–	–	–	–
Pos.	Rider	Points	POL (Poland)	CZE (Czech Republic)	DEN (Denmark)	SWE (Sweden)	GBR (United Kingdom)	SCA (Sweden)	PL2 (Poland)	SVN (Slovenia)	GER (Germany)	PL3 (Poland)
