= 2018 Speedway Grand Prix of Sweden =

- 2018 Norrbil Swedish FIM Speedway Grand Prix

Information
- Date: 7 July 2018
- City: (Sweden) Hallstavik
- Event: 4 of 10
- Referee: (Poland) Artur Kuzmierz

Stadium details
- Stadium: HZ Bygg Arena
- Capacity: 10,000
- Length: 289 m (316 yd)

SGP Results
- Best Time
- (gold) Winner: (Poland) Maciej Janowski
- (silver) Runner-up: (Sweden) Fredrik Lindgren
- (bronze) 3rd place: (Poland) Bartosz Zmarzlik

The 2018 Norrbil Swedish FIM Speedway Grand Prix was the fourth race of the 2018 Speedway Grand Prix season. It took place on July 7 at the HZ Bygg Arena in Hallstavik, Sweden.

== Riders ==
The Speedway Grand Prix Commission nominated Andreas Jonsson as the wild card, and Linus Sundström and Kim Nilsson both as Track Reserves.

== Results ==
The Grand Prix was won by Maciej Janowski, who beat Fredrik Lindgren, Bartosz Zmarzlik and Tai Woffinden in the final. Woffinden retained his overall world championship lead, in fact he extended it to 11 points after outscoring Lindgren by a point. Janowski moved up to fourth place, one point behind Emil Sayfutdinov.

=== Heat details ===
Placing	Draw	Rider	Total	1	2	3	4	5	6	7	8	9	10	11	12	13	14	15	16	17	18	19	20	Pts	Pos	21	22	23
Gold	4	(Poland) (71) Maciej Janowski	18	0							3				3				3				3	12	3		3	3
Silver	12	(Sweden) (66) Fredrik Lindgren	15			3					1		2			3						2		11	4	2		2
Bronze	18	(Poland) (95) Bartosz Zmarzlik	13																					10	5		2	1
4	1	(United Kingdom) (108) Tai Woffinden	16	3				3				2				2				3				13	1	3		0
5	13	(Russia) (89) Emil Sayfutdinov	14				3	2							2		3					3		13	2		1
6	2	(United States) (45) Greg Hancock	10	1					0				3				2				3			9	6	1
7	5	(Australia) (69) Jason Doyle	9		2			1					1					3					2	9	7	0
8	6	(Russia) (222) Artem Laguta	8		0				3			3							2			0		8	8		0
9	11	(Slovenia) (55) Matej Žagar	7			2				3		1					0						1	7	9
10	7	(Sweden) (16) Andreas Jonsson	7		1					2					1	1					2			7	10
11	3	(Australia) (23) Chris Holder	7	2						1				1				2				1		7	11
12	14	(Poland) (692) Patryk Dudek	6				2		2					2		0							0	6	12
13	15	(United Kingdom) (111) Craig Cook	3				0			0			0						1	2				3	13
14	10	(Denmark) (110) Nicki Pedersen	3			1			1						0			1		0				3	14
15	9	(Poland) (59) Przemysław Pawlicki	1			0		0						0					0		1			1	15
16	16	(Slovakia) (54) Martin Vaculík	1				1				0	0						0			0			1	16
Placing	Draw	Rider	Total	1	2	3	4	5	6	7	8	9	10	11	12	13	14	15	16	17	18	19	20	Pts	Pos	21	22	23

e: retired or mechanical failure • m: exclusion for exceeding two minute time allowance • t: exclusion for touching the tapes • x: other exclusion • f: fell
ns: non-starter • nc: non-classify
Semi-finals: Heat 21: Riders placed 1st, 4th, 6th & 7th in the intermediate classification (after 20 heats)
Heat 22: Riders placed 2nd, 3rd, 5th & 8th in the intermediate classification (after 20 heats)
Big Final (heat 23): The first and second placed riders in each of the Semi-Finals

gate A – inside	gate B	gate C	gate D – outside

== Intermediate classification ==
Qualifies for next season's Grand Prix series
Full-time Grand Prix rider
Wild card, track reserve or qualified reserve

Pos.	Rider	Points	POL (Poland)	CZE (Czech Republic)	DEN (Denmark)	SWE (Sweden)	GBR (United Kingdom)	SCA (Sweden)	PL2 (Poland)	SVN (Slovenia)	GER (Germany)	PL3 (Poland)
Gold	(United Kingdom) (108) Tai Woffinden	65	15	16	18	16	–	–	–	–	–	–
Silver	(Sweden) (66) Fredrik Lindgren	54	16	16	7	15	–	–	–	–	–	–
Bronze	(Russia) (89) Emil Sayfutdinov	48	8	15	11	14	–	–	–	–	–	–
4	(Poland) (71) Maciej Janowski	47	13	11	5	18	–	–	–	–	–	–
5	(Russia) (222) Artem Laguta	41	13	8	12	8	–	–	–	–	–	–
6	(United States) (45) Greg Hancock	41	8	7	16	10	–	–	–	–	–	–
7	(Poland) (692) Patryk Dudek	36	10	14	6	6	–	–	–	–	–	–
8	(Poland) (95) Bartosz Zmarzlik	36	9	4	10	13	–	–	–	–	–	–
9	(Australia) (69) Jason Doyle	35	5	9	12	9	–	–	–	–	–	–
10	(Australia) (23) Chris Holder	31	10	5	9	7	–	–	–	–	–	–
11	(Slovenia) (55) Matej Žagar	28	9	7	5	7	–	–	–	–	–	–
12	(Denmark) (110) Nicki Pedersen	25	2	8	12	3	–	–	–	–	–	–
13	(Poland) (59) Przemysław Pawlicki	14	3	5	5	1	–	–	–	–	–	–
14	(Denmark) (88) Niels-Kristian Iversen	9	4	5	–	–	–	–	–	–	–	–
15	(United Kingdom) (111) Craig Cook	9	2	2	2	3	–	–	–	–	–	–
16	(Poland) (16) Krzysztof Kasprzak	7	7	–	–	–	–	–	–	–	–	–
17	(Sweden) (16) Andreas Jonsson	7	–	–	–	7	–	–	–	–	–	–
18	(Czech Republic) (16) Vaclav Milik	6	–	6	–	–	–	–	–	–	–	–
19	(Denmark) (16) Michael Jepsen Jensen	4	–	–	4	–	–	–	–	–	–	–
20	(Slovakia) (54) Martin Vaculík	4	–	–	3	1	–	–	–	–	–	–
21	(Poland) (17) Maksym Drabik	2	2	–	–	–	–	–	–	–	–	–
22	(Poland) (18) Bartosz Smektała	2	2	–	–	–	–	–	–	–	–	–
23	(Denmark) (17) Mikkel Michelsen	1	–	–	1	–	–	–	–	–	–	–
24	(Denmark) (18) Mikkel Bech Jensen	0	–	–	0	–	–	–	–	–	–	–
Pos.	Rider	Points	POL (Poland)	CZE (Czech Republic)	DEN (Denmark)	SWE (Sweden)	GBR (United Kingdom)	SCA (Sweden)	PL2 (Poland)	SVN (Slovenia)	GER (Germany)	PL3 (Poland)
