= 2018 Speedway Grand Prix of Germany =

- 2018 German FIM Speedway Grand Prix

Information
- Date: 22 September 2018
- City: (Germany) Teterow
- Event: 9 of 10
- Referee: (United Kingdom) Craig Ackroyd

Stadium details
- Stadium: Bergring Arena
- Length: 314 m (343 yd)

SGP Results
- Best Time
- (gold) Winner: (United Kingdom) Tai Woffinden
- (silver) Runner-up: (Australia) Jason Doyle
- (bronze) 3rd place: (Poland) Bartosz Zmarzlik

The 2018 German FIM Speedway Grand Prix was the ninth race of the 2018 Speedway Grand Prix season. It took place on September 22 at the Bergring Arena in Teterow, Germany.

== Riders ==
First reserve Niels-Kristian Iversen replaced the injured Patryk Dudek. The Speedway Grand Prix Commission also nominated Kai Huckenbeck as the wild card, and Martin Smolinski and Kevin Wölbert both as Track Reserves.

== Results ==
The Grand Prix was won by Tai Woffinden, who beat defending world champion Jason Doyle, Bartosz Zmarzlik and Greg Hancock in the final. As a result of winning the Grand Prix, Woffinden extended his overall lead over Zmarzlik in the world championship standings to ten points with just one round remaining.

=== Heat details ===
Placing	Draw	Rider	Total	1	2	3	4	5	6	7	8	9	10	11	12	13	14	15	16	17	18	19	20	Pts	Pos	21	22	23
Gold	5	(United Kingdom) (108) Tai Woffinden	16		2			2					2					2					3	11	5		2	3
Silver	4	(Australia) (69) Jason Doyle	16	3							3				0				2				3	11	2		3	2
Bronze	12	(Poland) (95) Bartosz Zmarzlik	15			3					2		3			2						2		12	1	2		1
4	13	(United States) (45) Greg Hancock	12				2	3							1		3					0		9	6	3		0
5	8	(Slovenia) (55) Matej Žagar	12		3						1			2			2			3				11	3		1
6	10	(Denmark) (88) Niels-Kristian Iversen	12			1			3						3			2		2				11	4	1
7	14	(Poland) (71) Maciej Janowski	9				3		1					1		3							1	9	7	0
8	7	(Sweden) (66) Fredrik Lindgren	9		1					3					2	1					2			9	8		0
9	9	(Denmark) (110) Nicki Pedersen	8			0		1						3					3		1			8	9
10	6	(Russia) (89) Emil Sayfutdinov	8		0				2			2							1			3		8	10
11	11	(Australia) (23) Chris Holder	7			2				1		3					1						0	7	11
12	3	(Russia) (222) Artem Laguta	4	0						2				0				1				1		4	12
13	18	(Germany) (18) Kevin Wölbert	3																					3	13
14	2	(Poland) (59) Przemysław Pawlicki	3	2					0				1				0				0			3	14
15	1	(Germany) (16) Kai Huckenbeck	2	1				0				1				0				0				2	15
16	17	(Germany) (17) Martin Smolinski	1																					1	16
17	15	(Slovakia) (54) Martin Vaculík	0				0																	0	17
18	16	(United Kingdom) (111) Craig Cook	0				0																	0	18
Placing	Draw	Rider	Total	1	2	3	4	5	6	7	8	9	10	11	12	13	14	15	16	17	18	19	20	Pts	Pos	21	22	23

e: retired or mechanical failure • m: exclusion for exceeding two minute time allowance • t: exclusion for touching the tapes • x: other exclusion • f: fell
ns: non-starter • nc: non-classify
Semi-finals: Heat 21: Riders placed 1st, 4th, 6th & 7th in the intermediate classification (after 20 heats)
Heat 22: Riders placed 2nd, 3rd, 5th & 8th in the intermediate classification (after 20 heats)
Big Final (heat 23): The first and second placed riders in each of the Semi-Finals

gate A – inside	gate B	gate C	gate D – outside

== Intermediate classification ==
Qualifies for next season's Grand Prix series
Full-time Grand Prix rider
Wild card, track reserve or qualified reserve

Pos.	Rider	Points	POL (Poland)	CZE (Czech Republic)	DEN (Denmark)	SWE (Sweden)	GBR (United Kingdom)	SCA (Sweden)	PL2 (Poland)	SVN (Slovenia)	GER (Germany)	PL3 (Poland)
Gold	(United Kingdom) (108) Tai Woffinden	124	15	16	18	16	16	10	12	5	16	–
Silver	(Poland) (95) Bartosz Zmarzlik	114	9	4	10	13	19	14	18	12	15	–
Bronze	(Poland) (71) Maciej Janowski	98	13	11	5	18	12	11	9	10	9	–
4	(Sweden) (66) Fredrik Lindgren	98	16	16	7	15	7	13	2	13	9	–
5	(United States) (45) Greg Hancock	93	8	7	16	10	12	3	10	15	12	–
6	(Australia) (69) Jason Doyle	86	5	9	12	9	5	4	9	17	16	–
7	(Poland) (692) Patryk Dudek	84	10	14	6	6	10	10	12	16	–	–
8	(Russia) (89) Emil Sayfutdinov	78	8	15	11	14	8	6	3	5	8	–
9	(Russia) (222) Artem Laguta	77	13	8	12	8	6	6	13	7	4	–
10	(Slovenia) (55) Matej Žagar	73	9	7	5	7	6	16	11	–	12	–
11	(Denmark) (110) Nicki Pedersen	67	2	8	12	3	6	15	6	7	8	–
12	(Australia) (23) Chris Holder	60	10	5	9	7	7	5	0	10	7	–
13	(Slovakia) (54) Martin Vaculík	44	–	–	3	1	3	10	18	9	0	–
14	(Poland) (59) Przemysław Pawlicki	35	3	5	5	1	10	3	3	2	3	–
15	(United Kingdom) (111) Craig Cook	30	2	2	2	3	9	3	4	5	0	–
16	(Denmark) (88) Niels-Kristian Iversen	26	4	5	–	–	–	–	–	5	12	–
17	(Poland) (16) Szymon Woźniak	8	–	–	–	–	–	–	8	–	–	–
18	(Poland) (16) Krzysztof Kasprzak	7	7	–	–	–	–	–	–	–	–	–
19	(Sweden) (16) Andreas Jonsson	7	–	–	–	7	–	–	–	–	–	–
20	(Czech Republic) (16) Vaclav Milik	6	–	6	–	–	–	–	–	–	–	–
21	(Sweden) (16) Peter Ljung	5	–	–	–	–	–	5	–	–	–	–
22	(Denmark) (16) Michael Jepsen Jensen	4	–	–	4	–	–	–	–	–	–	–
23	(Sweden) (17) Oliver Berntzon	3	–	–	–	–	–	3	–	–	–	–
24	(Germany) (18) Kevin Wölbert	3	–	–	–	–	–	–	–	–	3	–
25	(Poland) (17) Maksym Drabik	2	2	–	–	–	–	–	–	–	–	–
26	(Poland) (18) Bartosz Smektała	2	2	–	–	–	–	–	–	–	–	–
27	(Germany) (16) Kai Huckenbeck	2	–	–	–	–	–	–	–	–	2	–
28	(Denmark) (17) Mikkel Michelsen	1	–	–	1	–	–	–	–	–	–	–
29	(United Kingdom) (16) Robert Lambert	1	–	–	–	–	1	–	–	–	–	–
30	(Sweden) (18) Joel Kling	1	–	–	–	–	–	1	–	–	–	–
31	(Germany) (17) Martin Smolinski	1	–	–	–	–	–	–	–	–	1	–
32	(Denmark) (18) Mikkel Bech Jensen	0	–	–	0	–	–	–	–	–	–	–
33	(United Kingdom) (17) Daniel Bewley	0	–	–	–	–	0	–	–	–	–	–
34	(Slovenia) (16) Matic Ivačič	0	–	–	–	–	–	–	–	0	–	–
35	(Slovenia) (17) Nick Škorja	0	–	–	–	–	–	–	–	0	–	–
Pos.	Rider	Points	POL (Poland)	CZE (Czech Republic)	DEN (Denmark)	SWE (Sweden)	GBR (United Kingdom)	SCA (Sweden)	PL2 (Poland)	SVN (Slovenia)	GER (Germany)	PL3 (Poland)
