= 2018 Speedway Grand Prix of Poland III =

2018 Speedway Grand Prix of Poland
- 2018 Toruń FIM Speedway Grand Prix of Poland

Information
- Date: 6 October 2018
- City: (Poland) Toruń
- Event: 10 of 10
- Referee: (Denmark) Jesper Steentoft

Stadium details
- Stadium: Marian Rose MotoArena
- Capacity: 15,500
- Length: 325 m (355 yd)

SGP Results
- Best Time
- (gold) Winner: (United Kingdom) Tai Woffinden
- (silver) Runner-up: (Russia) Artem Laguta
- (bronze) 3rd place: (Russia) Emil Sayfutdinov

The 2018 Toruń FIM Speedway Grand Prix of Poland was the tenth and final race of the 2018 Speedway Grand Prix season. It took place on October 6 at the Marian Rose MotoArena in Toruń, Poland.

== Riders ==
First reserve Niels-Kristian Iversen replaced the injured Patryk Dudek, while second reserve Václav Milík Jr. replaced the injured Craig Cook. The Speedway Grand Prix Commission also nominated Daniel Kaczmarek as the wild card, and Igor Kopeć-Sobczyński and Dominik Kubera both as Track Reserves.

== Results ==
The Grand Prix was won by Tai Woffinden, who beat Artem Laguta, Emil Sayfutdinov and Niels-Kristian Iversen in the final. Woffinden was crowned world champion for the third time in his career when finishing second in the second semi-final, while his nearest rival Bartosz Zmarzlik was eliminated. Laguta had initially top scored during the qualifying heats, scoring a 15-point maximum, but was denied a full maximum when finishing second to Woffinden in the final.

=== Heat details ===
Placing	Draw	Rider	Total	1	2	3	4	5	6	7	8	9	10	11	12	13	14	15	16	17	18	19	20	Pts	Pos	21	22	23
Gold	14	(United Kingdom) (108) Tai Woffinden	15				3		3					0		1							3	10	3		2	3
Silver	12	(Russia) (222) Artem Laguta	20			3					3		3			3						3		15	1	3		2
Bronze	16	(Russia) (89) Emil Sayfutdinov	11				2				2	0						1			3			8	6	2		1
4	7	(Denmark) (88) Niels-Kristian Iversen	10		2					2					3	0					0			7	8		3	0
5	3	(Poland) (95) Bartosz Zmarzlik	15	3						3				3				3				2		14	2		1
6	2	(Sweden) (66) Fredrik Lindgren	11	2					2				1				3				2			10	4	1
7	1	(United States) (45) Greg Hancock	9	0				3				3				2				1				9	5		0
8	9	(Slovakia) (17) Martin Vaculík	8			1		1						2					3		1			8	7	0
9	8	(Australia) (69) Jason Doyle	7		3						1			1			0			2				7	9
10	5	(Denmark) (110) Nicki Pedersen	7		1			2					2					2					0	7	10
11	11	(Slovenia) (55) Matej Žagar	6			2				0		1					1						2	6	11
12	4	(Poland) (71) Maciej Janowski	6	1							0				2				2				1	6	12
13	15	(Australia) (23) Chris Holder	5				1			1			0						0	3				5	13
14	16	(Czech Republic) (225) Václav Milík Jr.	5				0				1	2						1			1			5	14
15	6	(Poland) (16) Daniel Kaczmarek	2		0				0			0							2			0		2	15
16	10	(Poland) (59) Przemysław Pawlicki	1			0			0						1			0		0				1	16
17	17	(Poland) (17) Igor Kopeć-Sobczyński	0																					0	17
Placing	Draw	Rider	Total	1	2	3	4	5	6	7	8	9	10	11	12	13	14	15	16	17	18	19	20	Pts	Pos	21	22	23

e: retired or mechanical failure • m: exclusion for exceeding two minute time allowance • t: exclusion for touching the tapes • x: other exclusion • f: fell
ns: non-starter • nc: non-classify
Semi-finals: Heat 21: Riders placed 1st, 4th, 6th & 7th in the intermediate classification (after 20 heats)
Heat 22: Riders placed 2nd, 3rd, 5th & 8th in the intermediate classification (after 20 heats)
Big Final (heat 23): The first and second placed riders in each of the Semi-Finals

gate A – inside	gate B	gate C	gate D – outside

== Final Classification ==
Qualifies for next season's Grand Prix series
Full-time Grand Prix rider
Wild card, track reserve or qualified reserve

Pos.	Rider	Points	POL (Poland)	CZE (Czech Republic)	DEN (Denmark)	SWE (Sweden)	GBR (United Kingdom)	SCA (Sweden)	PL2 (Poland)	SVN (Slovenia)	GER (Germany)	PL3 (Poland)
Gold	(United Kingdom) (108) Tai Woffinden	139	15	16	18	16	16	10	12	5	16	15
Silver	(Poland) (95) Bartosz Zmarzlik	129	9	4	10	13	19	14	18	12	15	15
Bronze	(Sweden) (66) Fredrik Lindgren	109	16	16	7	15	7	13	2	13	9	11
4	(Poland) (71) Maciej Janowski	104	13	11	5	18	12	11	9	10	9	6
5	(United States) (45) Greg Hancock	102	8	7	16	10	12	3	10	15	12	9
6	(Russia) (222) Artem Laguta	97	13	8	12	8	6	6	13	7	4	20
7	(Australia) (69) Jason Doyle	93	5	9	12	9	5	4	9	17	16	7
8	(Russia) (89) Emil Sayfutdinov	89	8	15	11	14	8	6	3	5	8	11
9	(Poland) (692) Patryk Dudek	84	10	14	6	6	10	10	12	16	–	–
10	(Slovenia) (55) Matej Žagar	79	9	7	5	7	6	16	11	–	12	6
11	(Denmark) (110) Nicki Pedersen	74	2	8	12	3	6	15	6	7	8	7
12	(Australia) (23) Chris Holder	65	10	5	9	7	7	5	0	10	7	5
13	(Slovakia) (54) Martin Vaculík	52	–	–	3	1	3	10	18	9	0	8
14	(Denmark) (88) Niels-Kristian Iversen	36	4	5	–	–	–	–	–	5	12	10
15	(Poland) (59) Przemysław Pawlicki	36	3	5	5	1	10	3	3	2	3	1
16	(United Kingdom) (111) Craig Cook	30	2	2	2	3	9	3	4	5	0	–
17	(Czech Republic) (16) Vaclav Milik	11	–	6	–	–	–	–	–	–	–	5
18	(Poland) (16) Szymon Woźniak	8	–	–	–	–	–	–	8	–	–	–
19	(Poland) (16) Krzysztof Kasprzak	7	7	–	–	–	–	–	–	–	–	–
20	(Sweden) (16) Andreas Jonsson	7	–	–	–	7	–	–	–	–	–	–
21	(Sweden) (16) Peter Ljung	5	–	–	–	–	–	5	–	–	–	–
22	(Denmark) (16) Michael Jepsen Jensen	4	–	–	4	–	–	–	–	–	–	–
23	(Sweden) (17) Oliver Berntzon	3	–	–	–	–	–	3	–	–	–	–
24	(Germany) (18) Kevin Wölbert	3	–	–	–	–	–	–	–	–	3	–
25	(Poland) (17) Maksym Drabik	2	2	–	–	–	–	–	–	–	–	–
26	(Poland) (18) Bartosz Smektała	2	2	–	–	–	–	–	–	–	–	–
27	(Germany) (16) Kai Huckenbeck	2	–	–	–	–	–	–	–	–	2	–
28	(Poland) (16) Daniel Kaczmarek	2	–	–	–	–	–	–	–	–	–	2
29	(Denmark) (17) Mikkel Michelsen	1	–	–	1	–	–	–	–	–	–	–
30	(United Kingdom) (16) Robert Lambert	1	–	–	–	–	1	–	–	–	–	–
31	(Sweden) (18) Joel Kling	1	–	–	–	–	–	1	–	–	–	–
32	(Germany) (17) Martin Smolinski	1	–	–	–	–	–	–	–	–	1	–
33	(Denmark) (18) Mikkel Bech Jensen	0	–	–	0	–	–	–	–	–	–	–
34	(United Kingdom) (17) Daniel Bewley	0	–	–	–	–	0	–	–	–	–	–
35	(Slovenia) (16) Matic Ivačič	0	–	–	–	–	–	–	–	0	–	–
36	(Slovenia) (17) Nick Škorja	0	–	–	–	–	–	–	–	0	–	–
37	(Poland) (17) Igor Kopeć-Sobczyński	0	–	–	–	–	–	–	–	–	–	0
Pos.	Rider	Points	POL (Poland)	CZE (Czech Republic)	DEN (Denmark)	SWE (Sweden)	GBR (United Kingdom)	SCA (Sweden)	PL2 (Poland)	SVN (Slovenia)	GER (Germany)	PL3 (Poland)
