= 2018 Speedway Grand Prix of Great Britain =

2018 racing event

(United Kingdom) 2018 Speedway Grand Prix of Great Britain
- 2018 Adrian Flux British FIM Speedway Grand Prix

Information
- Date: 21 July 2018
- City: (United Kingdom) Cardiff
- Event: 5 of 10
- Referee: (Germany) Christian Froschauer

Stadium details
- Stadium: Principality Stadium
- Capacity: 62,500
- Length: 272 m (297 yd)

SGP Results
- Best Time
- (gold) Winner: (Poland) Bartosz Zmarzlik
- (silver) Runner-up: (United Kingdom) Tai Woffinden
- (bronze) 3rd place: (Poland) Maciej Janowski

The 2018 Adrian Flux British FIM Speedway Grand Prix was the fifth race of the 2018 Speedway Grand Prix season. It took place on 21 July at the Principality Stadium in Cardiff, Wales.

== Riders ==
The Speedway Grand Prix Commission nominated Robert Lambert as the wild card, and Daniel Bewley and Jason Garrity both as Track Reserves.

== Results ==
The Grand Prix was won by Bartosz Zmarzlik, who beat Tai Woffinden, Maciej Janowski and Greg Hancock in the final. As a result of finishing second, Woffinden extended his overall lead in the championship to 20 points. Fredrik Lindgren, who failed to make the semi-finals, remained in second place, just two points ahead of Janowski in third.

=== Heat details ===
Placing	Draw	Rider	Total	1	2	3	4	5	6	7	8	9	10	11	12	13	14	15	16	17	18	19	20	Pts	Pos	21	22	23
Gold	15	(Poland) (95) Bartosz Zmarzlik	19				3			3			2						3	2				13	1	3		3
Silver	1	(United Kingdom) (108) Tai Woffinden	16	3				1				3				1				3				11	2		3	2
Bronze	7	(Poland) (71) Maciej Janowski	12		3					0					3	0					3			9	6	2		1
4	12	(United States) (45) Greg Hancock	12			0					3		3			2						2		10	3		2	0
5	16	(Poland) (692) Patryk Dudek	10				1				2	2						3			2			10	4	0
6	3	(Poland) (59) Przemysław Pawlicki	10	2						2				2				2				1		9	7	1
7	14	(United Kingdom) (111) Craig Cook	9				0		3					3		3							0	9	5		0
8	13	(Russia) (89) Emil Sayfutdinov	8				2	3							2		0					0		7	8		1
9	6	(Australia) (23) Chris Holder	7		2				1			1							0			3		7	9
10	2	(Sweden) (66) Fredrik Lindgren	7	1					2				1				2				1			7	10
11	4	(Slovenia) (55) Matej Žagar	6	0							1				1				1				3	6	11
12	8	(Russia) (222) Artem Laguta	6		1						0			1			3			1				6	12
13	9	(Denmark) (110) Nicki Pedersen	6			2		2						0					2		0			6	13
14	11	(Australia) (69) Jason Doyle	5			1				1		0					1						2	5	14
15	10	(Slovakia) (54) Martin Vaculík	3			3			0						0			0		0				3	15
16	5	(United Kingdom) (16) Robert Lambert	1					0					0					1					0	1	16
17	17	(United Kingdom) (17) Daniel Bewley	0																					0	17
Placing	Draw	Rider	Total	1	2	3	4	5	6	7	8	9	10	11	12	13	14	15	16	17	18	19	20	Pts	Pos	21	22	23

e: retired or mechanical failure • m: exclusion for exceeding two minute time allowance • t: exclusion for touching the tapes • x: other exclusion • f: fell
ns: non-starter • nc: non-classify
Semi-finals: Heat 21: Riders placed 1st, 4th, 6th & 7th in the intermediate classification (after 20 heats)
Heat 22: Riders placed 2nd, 3rd, 5th & 8th in the intermediate classification (after 20 heats)
Big Final (heat 23): The first and second placed riders in each of the Semi-Finals

gate A – inside	gate B	gate C	gate D – outside

== Intermediate classification ==
Qualifies for next season's Grand Prix series
Full-time Grand Prix rider
Wild card, track reserve or qualified reserve

Pos.	Rider	Points	POL (Poland)	CZE (Czech Republic)	DEN (Denmark)	SWE (Sweden)	GBR (United Kingdom)	SCA (Sweden)	PL2 (Poland)	SVN (Slovenia)	GER (Germany)	PL3 (Poland)
Gold	(United Kingdom) (108) Tai Woffinden	81	15	16	18	16	16	–	–	–	–	–
Silver	(Sweden) (66) Fredrik Lindgren	61	16	16	7	15	7	–	–	–	–	–
Bronze	(Poland) (71) Maciej Janowski	59	13	11	5	18	12	–	–	–	–	–
4	(Russia) (89) Emil Sayfutdinov	56	8	15	11	14	8	–	–	–	–	–
5	(Poland) (95) Bartosz Zmarzlik	55	9	4	10	13	19	–	–	–	–	–
6	(United States) (45) Greg Hancock	53	8	7	16	10	12	–	–	–	–	–
7	(Russia) (222) Artem Laguta	47	13	8	12	8	6	–	–	–	–	–
8	(Poland) (692) Patryk Dudek	46	10	14	6	6	10	–	–	–	–	–
9	(Australia) (69) Jason Doyle	40	5	9	12	9	5	–	–	–	–	–
10	(Australia) (23) Chris Holder	38	10	5	9	7	7	–	–	–	–	–
11	(Slovenia) (55) Matej Žagar	34	9	7	5	7	6	–	–	–	–	–
12	(Denmark) (110) Nicki Pedersen	31	2	8	12	3	6	–	–	–	–	–
13	(Poland) (59) Przemysław Pawlicki	24	3	5	5	1	10	–	–	–	–	–
14	(United Kingdom) (111) Craig Cook	18	2	2	2	3	9	–	–	–	–	–
15	(Denmark) (88) Niels-Kristian Iversen	9	4	5	–	–	–	–	–	–	–	–
16	(Slovakia) (54) Martin Vaculík	7	–	–	3	1	3	–	–	–	–	–
17	(Poland) (16) Krzysztof Kasprzak	7	7	–	–	–	–	–	–	–	–	–
18	(Sweden) (16) Andreas Jonsson	7	–	–	–	7	–	–	–	–	–	–
19	(Czech Republic) (16) Vaclav Milik	6	–	6	–	–	–	–	–	–	–	–
20	(Denmark) (16) Michael Jepsen Jensen	4	–	–	4	–	–	–	–	–	–	–
21	(Poland) (17) Maksym Drabik	2	2	–	–	–	–	–	–	–	–	–
22	(Poland) (18) Bartosz Smektała	2	2	–	–	–	–	–	–	–	–	–
23	(United Kingdom) (16) Robert Lambert	1	–	–	–	–	1	–	–	–	–	–
24	(Denmark) (17) Mikkel Michelsen	1	–	–	1	–	–	–	–	–	–	–
25	(Denmark) (18) Mikkel Bech Jensen	0	–	–	0	–	–	–	–	–	–	–
26	(United Kingdom) (17) Daniel Bewley	0	–	–	–	–	0	–	–	–	–	–
Pos.	Rider	Points	POL (Poland)	CZE (Czech Republic)	DEN (Denmark)	SWE (Sweden)	GBR (United Kingdom)	SCA (Sweden)	PL2 (Poland)	SVN (Slovenia)	GER (Germany)	PL3 (Poland)

== See also ==
- Motorcycle speedway
