= 2018 Speedway Grand Prix of Czech Republic =

- 2018 Anlas Czech Republic FIM Speedway Grand Prix

Information
- Date: 26 May 2018
- City: (Czech Republic) Prague
- Event: 2 of 10
- Referee: (Denmark) Krister Gardell

Stadium details
- Stadium: Markéta Stadium
- Capacity: 10,000
- Length: 353 m (386 yd)

SGP Results
- Best Time
- (gold) Winner: (Sweden) Fredrik Lindgren
- (silver) Runner-up: (Poland) Patryk Dudek
- (bronze) 3rd place: (Russia) Emil Sayfutdinov

The 2018 Anlas Czech Republic FIM Speedway Grand Prix was the second race of the 2018 Speedway Grand Prix season. It took place on May 26 at the Markéta Stadium in Prague, Czech Republic.

== Riders ==
The Speedway Grand Prix Commission nominated Václav Milík as the wild card, and Josef Franc and Eduard Krčmář both as Track Reserves.

== Results ==
The Grand Prix was won by Fredrik Lindgren, who beat Patryk Dudek, Emil Sayfutdinov and Tai Woffinden in the final. Woffinden has initially top scored with 14 points in the qualifying heats, dropping just one point to Artem Laguta, however he was beaten by Dudek in the semi-finals and then finished last in the final. Lindgren's win saw him maintain his lead in the overall world championship standings, two points ahead of Woffinden in second.

=== Heat details ===
Placing	Draw	Rider	Total	1	2	3	4	5	6	7	8	9	10	11	12	13	14	15	16	17	18	19	20	Pts	Pos	21	22	23
Gold	1	(Sweden) (66) Fredrik Lindgren	16	2				2				1				2				3				10	4	3		3
Silver	14	(Poland) (692) Patryk Dudek	14				0		2					1		3							3	9	5		3	2
Bronze	8	(Russia) (89) Emil Sayfutdinov	15		3						2			2			3			2				12	2		2	1
4	3	(United Kingdom) (108) Tai Woffinden	16	3						3				3				2				3		14	1	2		0
5	16	(Poland) (71) Maciej Janowski	11				3				3	3						0			2			11	3		0
6	15	(Australia) (69) Jason Doyle	9				1			1			2						3	1				8	7	1
7	9	(Denmark) (110) Nicki Pedersen	8			3		0						0					2		3			8	6	0
8	10	(Russia) (222) Artem Laguta	8			2			0						2			3		0				7	8		1
9	12	(Slovenia) (55) Matej Žagar	7			1					1		3			1						1		7	9
10	13	(United States) (45) Greg Hancock	7				2	1							1		1					2		7	10
11	2	(Czech Republic) (16) Václav Milík	6	0					3				0				2				1			6	11
12	4	(Denmark) (88) Niels-Kristian Iversen	5	1							0				3				0				1	5	12
13	5	(Poland) (59) Przemysław Pawlicki	5		0			3					1					1					0	5	13
14	6	(Australia) (23) Chris Holder	5		1				1			2							1			0		5	14
15	11	(Poland) (95) Bartosz Zmarzlik	4			0				2		0					0						2	4	15
16	7	(United Kingdom) (111) Craig Cook	2		2					0					0	0					0			2	16
Placing	Draw	Rider	Total	1	2	3	4	5	6	7	8	9	10	11	12	13	14	15	16	17	18	19	20	Pts	Pos	21	22	23

e: retired or mechanical failure • m: exclusion for exceeding two minute time allowance • t: exclusion for touching the tapes • x: other exclusion • f: fell
ns: non-starter • nc: non-classify
Semi-finals: Heat 21: Riders placed 1st, 4th, 6th & 7th in the intermediate classification (after 20 heats)
Heat 22: Riders placed 2nd, 3rd, 5th & 8th in the intermediate classification (after 20 heats)
Big Final (heat 23): The first and second placed riders in each of the Semi-Finals

gate A – inside	gate B	gate C	gate D – outside

== Intermediate classification ==
Qualifies for next season's Grand Prix series
Full-time Grand Prix rider
Wild card, track reserve or qualified reserve

Pos.	Rider	Points	POL (Poland)	CZE (Czech Republic)	DEN (Denmark)	SWE (Sweden)	GBR (United Kingdom)	SCA (Sweden)	PL2 (Poland)	SVN (Slovenia)	GER (Germany)	PL3 (Poland)
Gold	(Sweden) (66) Fredrik Lindgren	32	16	16	–	–	–	–	–	–	–	–
Silver	(United Kingdom) (108) Tai Woffinden	31	15	16	–	–	–	–	–	–	–	–
Bronze	(Poland) (692) Patryk Dudek	24	10	14	–	–	–	–	–	–	–	–
4	(Poland) (71) Maciej Janowski	24	13	11	–	–	–	–	–	–	–	–
5	(Russia) (89) Emil Sayfutdinov	23	8	15	–	–	–	–	–	–	–	–
6	(Russia) (222) Artem Laguta	21	13	8	–	–	–	–	–	–	–	–
7	(Slovenia) (55) Matej Žagar	16	9	7	–	–	–	–	–	–	–	–
8	(Australia) (23) Chris Holder	15	10	5	–	–	–	–	–	–	–	–
9	(United States) (45) Greg Hancock	15	8	7	–	–	–	–	–	–	–	–
10	(Australia) (69) Jason Doyle	14	5	9	–	–	–	–	–	–	–	–
11	(Poland) (95) Bartosz Zmarzlik	13	9	4	–	–	–	–	–	–	–	–
12	(Denmark) (110) Nicki Pedersen	10	2	8	–	–	–	–	–	–	–	–
13	(Denmark) (88) Niels-Kristian Iversen	9	4	5	–	–	–	–	–	–	–	–
14	(Poland) (59) Przemysław Pawlicki	8	3	5	–	–	–	–	–	–	–	–
15	(Poland) (16) Krzysztof Kasprzak	7	7	–	–	–	–	–	–	–	–	–
16	(Czech Republic) (16) Vaclav Milik	6	–	6	–	–	–	–	–	–	–	–
17	(United Kingdom) (111) Craig Cook	4	2	2	–	–	–	–	–	–	–	–
18	(Poland) (17) Maksym Drabik	2	2	–	–	–	–	–	–	–	–	–
19	(Poland) (18) Bartosz Smektała	2	2	–	–	–	–	–	–	–	–	–
Pos.	Rider	Points	POL (Poland)	CZE (Czech Republic)	DEN (Denmark)	SWE (Sweden)	GBR (United Kingdom)	SCA (Sweden)	PL2 (Poland)	SVN (Slovenia)	GER (Germany)	PL3 (Poland)
