= 2018 Speedway of Nations =

Motorcycle racing competition

Speedway of Nations
- Venue: Poland
- Start date: 2 June
- End date: 9 June
- Nations: 7

The 2018 Speedway of Nations was the first FIM Speedway of Nations. The competition consisted of two race-off events and a two-legged final. The event was won by Russia, who beat Great Britain in the Grand Final. It replaced the Speedway World Cup.

== Format ==
The 2018 Speedway of Nations was a pairs event, with each nation being represented by two senior riders and one rider under the age of 21. Each meeting was staged over 21 heats with the scores from each rider added together to give a total for each nation.

The two race-off events consisted of seven teams, with three qualifying for the final. The final, which included hosts Poland, was staged over two legs with the scores from each added together. The top scoring nation went straight through to the Grand Final, while the second and third placed nations competed in the final qualifier for the chance to reach the Grand Final.

The final qualifier and Grand Final were one-off heats. In the event of a tie, the second and third placed riders were considered the victors over the first and fourth placed riders.

The winner of the Grand Final determined the overall winner of the 2018 Speedway of Nations.

== Race Off 1 ==
- (Germany) Teterow
- June 2

1st	2nd	3rd
Russia - 25; Artem Laguta - 16; Emil Sayfutdinov - 9 Gleb Chugunov - DNR	Germany - 20; Kai Huckenbeck - 11; Martin Smolinski - 9 Michael Hartel - DNR	Denmark - 18; Michael Jepsen Jensen - 10; Kenneth Bjerre - 8 Frederik Jakobsen - DNR

4th	5th	6th	7th
Slovenia - 17; Matej Žagar - 14; Matic Ivačič - 2 Nick Škorja - 1	United States - 17; Greg Hancock - 16; Gino Manzares - 1	Ukraine - 15; Aleksandr Loktaev - 8 Andrey Karpov - 7	Latvia - 14; Andžejs Ļebedevs - 8 Kjasts Puodžuks - 6 Oļegs Mihailovs - DNR

== Race Off 2 ==
- (United Kingdom) Manchester
- June 5

1st	2nd	3rd
Sweden - 26; Fredrik Lindgren - 15; Antonio Lindbäck - 11; Joel Kling - DNR	Great Britain - 23; Tai Woffinden - 14; Robert Lambert - 8 Craig Cook - 1	Australia - 21; Jason Doyle - 14; Max Fricke - 7 Jaimon Lidsey - DNR

4th	5th	6th	7th
Czech Republic - 20; Václav Milík - 13; Josef Franc - 7 Jan Kvěch - DNR	France - 14; David Bellego - 10; Dimitri Bergé - 4	Finland - 14; Timo Lahti - 7 Tero Aarnio - 7	Italy - 8 Nicolás Covatti - 6 Michele Paco Castagna - 2

== Final ==
- (Poland) Wrocław, Olympic Stadium

=== First leg ===
- June 8

1st	2nd	3rd
Great Britain - 25; Tai Woffinden - 18; Robert Lambert - 7 Craig Cook - 0	Russia - 23; Artem Laguta - 17; Emil Sayfutdinov - 6 Gleb Chugunov - DNR	Denmark - 20; Michael Jepsen Jensen - 12; Kenneth Bjerre - 8 Frederik Jakobsen - DNR

4th	5th	6th	7th
Sweden - 16; Fredrik Lindgren - 13; Antonio Lindbäck - 3 Joel Kling - DNR	Australia - 15; Jason Doyle - 13; Max Fricke - 2 Jaimon Lidsey - DNR	Poland - 15; Maciej Janowski - 9 Patryk Dudek - 3 Maksym Drabik - 3	Germany - 8 Martin Smolinski - 11; Michael Hartel - 1 Kai Huckenbeck - DNR

=== Second leg ===
- June 8

1st	2nd	3rd
Russia - 22; Artem Laguta - 14; Emil Sayfutdinov - 8 Gleb Chugunov - DNR	Great Britain - 21; Tai Woffinden - 17; Robert Lambert - 4 Craig Cook - DNR	Poland - 21; Maciej Janowski - 13; Patryk Dudek - 8 Maksym Drabik - DNR

4th	5th	6th	7th
Australia - 20; Jason Doyle - 16; Max Fricke - 4 Jaimon Lidsey - DNR	Sweden - 16; Fredrik Lindgren - 9 Antonio Lindbäck - 7 Joel Kling - DNR	Denmark - 15; Michael Jepsen Jensen - 15; Kenneth Bjerre - 0 Frederik Jakobsen - 0	Germany - 11; Kai Huckenbeck - 9 Martin Smolinski - 2 Michael Hartel - 0

=== Total ===
1st	2nd	3rd
Great Britain - 46; Tai Woffinden - 35; Robert Lambert - 11; Craig Cook - 0	Russia - 45; Artem Laguta - 31; Emil Sayfutdinov - 14; Gleb Chugunov - DNR	Poland - 36; Maciej Janowski - 22; Patryk Dudek - 11; Maksym Drabik - 3

4th	5th	6th	7th
Australia - 35; Jason Doyle - 29; Max Fricke - 6 Jaimon Lidsey - DNR	Denmark - 35; Michael Jepsen Jensen - 27; Kenneth Bjerre - 8 Frederik Jakobsen - 0	Sweden - 32; Fredrik Lindgren - 22; Antonio Lindbäck - 10; Joel Kling - DNR	Germany - 23; Martin Smolinski - 13; Kai Huckenbeck - 9 Michael Hartel - 1

=== Grand Final Qualifier ===
1st	2nd
Russia - 3 Artem Laguta - 2 Emil Sayfutdinov - 1	Poland - 3 Maciej Janowski - 3 Patryk Dudek - 0

=== Grand Final ===
1st	2nd
Russia - 3 Artem Laguta - 2 Emil Sayfutdinov - 1	Great Britain - 3 Tai Woffinden - 3 Robert Lambert - 0

== See also ==
- 2018 Speedway Grand Prix
- motorcycle speedway
- 2018 in sports
