= 2018 Speedway Grand Prix of Denmark =

- 2018 WD-40 Danish FIM Speedway Grand Prix

Information
- Date: 30 June 2018
- City: (Denmark) Horsens
- Event: 3 of 10
- Referee: (United Kingdom) Craig Ackroyd

Stadium details
- Stadium: CASA Arena
- Capacity: 12,500
- Length: 272 m (297 yd)

SGP Results
- Best Time
- (gold) Winner: (United Kingdom) Tai Woffinden
- (silver) Runner-up: (Russia) Artem Laguta
- (bronze) 3rd place: (United States) Greg Hancock

The 2018 WD-40 Danish FIM Speedway Grand Prix was the third race of the 2018 Speedway Grand Prix season. It took place on 30 June at the CASA Arena in Horsens, Denmark.

== Riders ==
The Speedway Grand Prix Commission nominated Michael Jepsen Jensen as the wild card, and Mikkel Michelsen and Mikkel Bech Jensen both as Track Reserves.

== Results ==
The Grand Prix was won by Tai Woffinden, who beat Artem Laguta, Greg Hancock and defending world champion Jason Doyle in the final. As a result, Woffinden took the overall world championship standings. Former leader Fredrik Lindgren failed to make the semi-finals, leaving him ten points behind Woffinden in second place.

=== Heat details ===
Placing	Draw	Rider	Total	1	2	3	4	5	6	7	8	9	10	11	12	13	14	15	16	17	18	19	20	Pts	Pos	21	22	23
Gold	11	(United Kingdom) (108) Tai Woffinden	18			2				3		1					3						3	12	1	3		3
Silver	14	(Russia) (222) Artem Laguta	12				0		3					2		2							1	8	8		2	2
Bronze	16	(United States) (45) Greg Hancock	16				2				3	2						3			2			12	2		3	1
4	2	(Australia) (69) Jason Doyle	12	2					0				3				2				3			10	4	2		0
5	1	(Denmark) (110) Nicki Pedersen	12	3				2				0				3				3				11	3		1
6	10	(Russia) (89) Emil Sayfutdinov	11			3			2						2			2		1				10	6	1
7	6	(Poland) (95) Bartosz Zmarzlik	10		1				1			3							3			2		10	5		0
8	13	(Australia) (23) Chris Holder	9				1	3							3		1					1		9	7	0
9	5	(Sweden) (66) Fredrik Lindgren	7		3			1					0					1					2	7	9
10	3	(Poland) (692) Patryk Dudek	6	0						2				1				0				3		6	10
11	8	(Slovenia) (55) Matej Žagar	5		0						0			3			0			2				5	11
12	4	(Poland) (71) Maciej Janowski	5	1							2				1				1				0	5	12
13	12	(Poland) (59) Przemysław Pawlicki	5			1					1		2			1						0		5	13
14	7	(Denmark) (16) Michael Jepsen Jensen	4		2					1					0	0					1			4	14
15	15	(Slovakia) (54) Martin Vaculík	3				3			0			0						0					3	15
16	9	(United Kingdom) (111) Craig Cook	2			0		0						0					2		0			2	16
17	17	(Denmark) (17) Mikkel Michelsen	1																					1	17
18	18	(Denmark) (18) Mikkel Bech Jensen	0																					0	18
Placing	Draw	Rider	Total	1	2	3	4	5	6	7	8	9	10	11	12	13	14	15	16	17	18	19	20	Pts	Pos	21	22	23

e: retired or mechanical failure • m: exclusion for exceeding two minute time allowance • t: exclusion for touching the tapes • x: other exclusion • f: fell
ns: non-starter • nc: non-classify
Semi-finals: Heat 21: Riders placed 1st, 4th, 6th & 7th in the intermediate classification (after 20 heats)
Heat 22: Riders placed 2nd, 3rd, 5th & 8th in the intermediate classification (after 20 heats)
Big Final (heat 23): The first and second placed riders in each of the Semi-Finals

gate A – inside	gate B	gate C	gate D – outside

== Intermediate classification ==
Qualifies for next season's Grand Prix series
Full-time Grand Prix rider
Wild card, track reserve or qualified reserve

Pos.	Rider	Points	POL (Poland)	CZE (Czech Republic)	DEN (Denmark)	SWE (Sweden)	GBR (United Kingdom)	SCA (Sweden)	PL2 (Poland)	SVN (Slovenia)	GER (Germany)	PL3 (Poland)
Gold	(United Kingdom) (108) Tai Woffinden	49	15	16	18	–	–	–	–	–	–	–
Silver	(Sweden) (66) Fredrik Lindgren	39	16	16	7	–	–	–	–	–	–	–
Bronze	(Russia) (89) Emil Sayfutdinov	34	8	15	11	–	–	–	–	–	–	–
4	(Russia) (222) Artem Laguta	33	13	8	12	–	–	–	–	–	–	–
5	(United States) (45) Greg Hancock	31	8	7	16	–	–	–	–	–	–	–
6	(Poland) (692) Patryk Dudek	30	10	14	6	–	–	–	–	–	–	–
7	(Poland) (71) Maciej Janowski	29	13	11	5	–	–	–	–	–	–	–
8	(Australia) (69) Jason Doyle	26	5	9	12	–	–	–	–	–	–	–
9	(Australia) (23) Chris Holder	24	10	5	9	–	–	–	–	–	–	–
10	(Poland) (95) Bartosz Zmarzlik	23	9	4	10	–	–	–	–	–	–	–
11	(Denmark) (110) Nicki Pedersen	22	2	8	12	–	–	–	–	–	–	–
12	(Slovenia) (55) Matej Žagar	21	9	7	5	–	–	–	–	–	–	–
13	(Poland) (59) Przemysław Pawlicki	13	3	5	5	–	–	–	–	–	–	–
14	(Denmark) (88) Niels-Kristian Iversen	9	4	5	–	–	–	–	–	–	–	–
15	(Poland) (16) Krzysztof Kasprzak	7	7	–	–	–	–	–	–	–	–	–
16	(Czech Republic) (16) Vaclav Milik	6	–	6	–	–	–	–	–	–	–	–
17	(United Kingdom) (111) Craig Cook	6	2	2	2	–	–	–	–	–	–	–
18	(Denmark) (16) Michael Jepsen Jensen	4	–	–	4	–	–	–	–	–	–	–
19	(Slovakia) (54) Martin Vaculík	3	–	–	3	–	–	–	–	–	–	–
20	(Poland) (17) Maksym Drabik	2	2	–	–	–	–	–	–	–	–	–
21	(Poland) (18) Bartosz Smektała	2	2	–	–	–	–	–	–	–	–	–
22	(Denmark) (17) Mikkel Michelsen	1	–	–	1	–	–	–	–	–	–	–
23	(Denmark) (18) Mikkel Bech Jensen	0	–	–	0	–	–	–	–	–	–	–
Pos.	Rider	Points	POL (Poland)	CZE (Czech Republic)	DEN (Denmark)	SWE (Sweden)	GBR (United Kingdom)	SCA (Sweden)	PL2 (Poland)	SVN (Slovenia)	GER (Germany)	PL3 (Poland)
