= 2018 Speedway Grand Prix Qualification =

The 2018 Individual Speedway World Championship Grand Prix Qualification was a series of motorcycle speedway meetings that were used to determine the three riders that qualified for the 2018 Speedway Grand Prix. The series consisted of four qualifying rounds at Esbjerg, Žarnovica, Lonigo and Abensberg, two semi-finals at Olching and Terenzano and the Grand Prix Challenge at Togliatti. The three riders that qualified were Przemysław Pawlicki, Artem Laguta and Craig Cook.

== Qualifying rounds ==
=== Round One ===
- 6 May 2017
- (Denmark) Esbjerg

Pos.	Rider	Points	Details
1	(Poland) Piotr Pawlicki Jr.	12	(3,3,2,3,1)
2	(Denmark) Kenneth Bjerre	11+3	(3,1,2,2,3)
3	(Germany) Kai Huckenbeck	11+2	(0,3,2,3,3)
4	(Latvia) Kjasts Puodžuks	11+1	(2,3,3,1,2)
5	(United Kingdom) Chris Harris	10	(3,2,3,2,0)
6	(Sweden) Peter Ljung	10	(2,2,3,1,2)
7	(Denmark) Michael Jepsen Jensen	9+3	(2,3,1,0,3)
8	(Denmark) Mikkel Michelsen	9+2	(2,1,0,3,3)
9	(Australia) Sam Masters	9+1	(3,2,1,2,1)
10	(Finland) Timo Lahti	6	(1,2,1,1,1)
11	(Denmark) Rasmus Jensen	5	(-,-,3,0,2)
12	(Sweden) Jacob Thorssell	5	(0,1,1,3,0)
13	(United Kingdom) Danny King	5	(1,0,2,0,2)
14	(Russia) Andrey Kudryashov	3	(1,0,0,1,1)
15	(Finland) Tero Aarnio	2	(0,0,0,2,0)
16	(Norway) Glenn Moi	2	(1,1,0,0,0)
17	(Poland) Janusz Kołodziej	0	(0,D,-,-,-)
	(Denmark) René Bach	DNS	

=== Round Three ===
- 7 May 2017
- (Italy) Lonigo

Pos.	Rider	Points	Details
1	(United Kingdom) Craig Cook	14	(3,2,3,3,3)
2	(Australia) Max Fricke	13+3	(3,3,3,3,1)
3	(Sweden) Pontus Aspgren	13+2	(3,3,3,1,3)
4	(Latvia) Maksims Bogdanovs	12	(3,2,2,2,3)
5	(Sweden) Linus Sundström	12	(2,3,2,3,2)
6	(Germany) Kevin Wölbert	10	(2,2,3,0,3)
7	(Czech Republic) Václav Milík Jr.	9	(W,3,2,2,2)
8	(Croatia) Jurica Pavlic	7	(0,1,1,3,2)
9	(Australia) Justin Sedgmen	7	(1,2,2,2,W)
10	(Hungary) József Tabaka	6	(2,0,1,1,2)
11	(Italy) Guglielmo Franchetti	5	(1,1,0,2,1)
12	(Italy) Daniele Tessari	4	(1,1,1,0,1)
13	(Slovenia) Denis Štojs	3	(2,1,0,U,0)
14	(France) John Bernard	2	(0,0,1,1,0)
15	(France) Alexandre Dubrana	1	(1,0,U,U,U)
16	(Italy) Alessandro Milanese	1	(0,0,0,0,1)
	(Italy) Alessandro Novello	DNS	

=== Round Two ===
- 6 May 2017
- (Slovakia) Žarnovica

Pos.	Rider	Points	Details
1	(Slovakia) Martin Vaculík	14	(3,3,3,3,2)
2	(Slovenia) Matej Žagar	13	(3,2,3,2,3)
3	(Poland) Adrian Miedziński	11+3	(2,3,1,2,3)
4	(Poland) Patryk Dudek	11+2	(3,2,2,3,1)
5	(Ukraine) Andrey Karpov	11+1	(2,3,2,2,2)
6	(Russia) Grigory Laguta	10+3	(1,1,3,2,3)
7	(Denmark) Leon Madsen	10+2	(3,2,1,1,3)
8	(Latvia) Andžejs Ļebedevs	10+1	(0,3,2,3,2)
9	(Czech Republic) Tomáš Suchánek	7	(1,0,3,1,2)
10	(Australia) Troy Batchelor	7	(2,1,2,1,1)
11	(Czech Republic) Eduard Krčmář	5	(2,1,1,D,1)
12	(Hungary) Norbert Magosi	4	(0,0,1,3,0)
13	(Germany) Mark Riss	3	(1,1,0,0,1)
14	(Italy) Michele Paco Castagna	2	(0,2,0,0,0)
15	(Slovenia) Nick Škorja	1	(0,0,0,1,0)
16	(Slovakia) Patrik Buri	1	(1,0,0,0,0)
	(Slovakia) Ján Mihálik	DNS	
	(Slovakia) Jakub Valkovič	DNS	

=== Round Four ===
- 5 June 2017
- (Germany) Abensberg

Pos.	Rider	Points	Details
1	(Denmark) Peter Kildemand	13	(3,2,2,3,3)
2	(Poland) Mateusz Szczepaniak	12	(1,3,3,2,3)
3	(Denmark) Hans N. Andersen	11+3	(3,3,1,2,2)
4	(Austria) Dany Gappmaier	11+2	(1,3,3,2,3)
5	(Sweden) Oliver Berntzon	10	(2,3,2,1,2)
6	(Poland) Przemysław Pawlicki	10	(2,1,2,3,2)
7	(Czech Republic) Matěj Kůs	9+3	(D,1,3,2,3)
8	(Germany) Martin Smolinski	9+2	(2,2,1,3,1)
9	(Germany) Erik Riss	9+0	(3,2,0,1,3)
10	(Sweden) Ludvig Lindgren	7	(1,2,0,3,1)
11	(Italy) Nicolas Vicentin	6	(3,W,1,1,1)
12	(New Zealand) Bradley Wilson-Dean	5	(2,1,2,W,W)
13	(United States) Ricky Wells	4	(W,0,3,T,1)
14	(Finland) Niklas Sayrio	3	(1,1,1,0,0)
15	(Austria) Mike Jacopetti	1	(0,0,0,1,0)
16	(Czech Republic) Patrik Mikel	0	(0,0,W,-,-)
17	(Germany) Danny Maasen	0	(-,-,-,0,0)
18	(Germany) Max Dilger	0	(-,-,-D,-)

== Semi-finals ==
=== Semi-final 1 ===
- 15 June 2017
- (Germany) Olching

Pos.	Rider	Points	Details
1	(Denmark) Leon Madsen	15	(3,3,3,3,3)
2	(Poland) Piotr Pawlicki Jr.	14	(3,3,3,3,2)
3	(Germany) Martin Smolinski	10+3	(1,1,2,3,3)
4	(Poland) Adrian Miedziński	10+2	(1,3,1,2,3)
5	(Slovakia) Martin Vaculík	10+0	(3,2,3,2,0)
6	(Germany) Kai Huckenbeck	8+3	(1,2,3,0,2)
7	(Poland) Mateusz Szczepaniak	8+2	(3,3,1,1,0)
8	(Denmark) Kenneth Bjerre	8+1	(0,1,2,3,2)
9	(United Kingdom) Chris Harris	7	(1,2,2,1,1)
10	(Sweden) Peter Ljung	6	(0,2,0,1,3)
11	(Denmark) Hans N. Andersen	6	(0,1,2,2,1)
12	(Sweden) Oliver Berntzon	5	(2,1,1,1,0)
13	(Denmark) Mikkel Michelsen	4	(2,0,0,0,2)
14	(Latvia) Maksims Bogdanovs	4	(0,0,1,2,1)
15	(Latvia) Kjasts Puodžuks	3	(2,0,0,0,1)
16	(Ukraine) Andrey Karpov	2	(2,0,0,0,-)
17	(Germany) René Deddens	0	(-,-,-,-,0)
	(Germany) Erik Riss	DNR	

=== Semi-final 2 ===
- 17 June 2017
- (Italy) Terenzano

Pos.	Rider	Points	Details
1	(United Kingdom) Craig Cook	13	(3,3,2,3,2)
2	(Czech Republic) Václav Milík Jr.	12	(3,3,3,1,2)
3	(Slovenia) Matej Žagar	10+3	(1,2,2,2,3)
4	(Poland) Przemysław Pawlicki	10+2	(2,2,3,3,W)
5	(Denmark) Peter Kildemand	9	(3,2,1,0,3)
6	(Australia) Max Fricke	9	(2,2,0,2,3)
7	(Poland) Patryk Dudek	8+3	(T,1,3,2, 2)
8	(Denmark) Michael Jepsen Jensen	8+2	(1,3,3,0,1)
9	(Sweden) Linus Sundström	7	(0,3,1,0,3)
10	(Germany) Kevin Wölbert	7	(2,1,1,3,0)
11	(Croatia) Jurica Pavlic	7	(3,1,0,2,1)
12	(Russia) Grigory Laguta	6	(1,1,1,3,-)
13	(Sweden) Pontus Aspgren	5	(0,0,2,1,2)
14	(Austria) Dany Gappmaier	5	(1,0,2,1,1)
15	(Italy) Michele Paco Castagna	2	(2,-,-,-,-)
16	(Czech Republic) Matěj Kůs	1	(0,D,0,1,D)
17	(Italy) Daniele Tessari	1	(-,-,-,-,1)
18	(Italy) Guglielmo Franchetti	0	(0,0,0,0,0)

== 2017 Speedway Grand Prix Challenge ==
=== Grand Prix Challenge ===
- 19 August 2017
- (Russia) Togliatti
- Laguta and Jepsen Jensen were nominated as wildcards.
- Dudek finished third, but as he qualified for the 2018 Grand Prix series by virtue of finishing in the top 8 in the 2017 Grand Prix standings, the 4th place rider, Cook, was awarded a GP place.

Pos.	Rider	Points	Details
1	(Poland) Przemysław Pawlicki	13+3	(3,3,1,3,3)
2	(Russia) Artem Laguta	13+W	(2,3,2,3,3)
3	(Poland) Patryk Dudek	12	(1,2,3,3,3)
4	(United Kingdom) Craig Cook	11	(0,3,3,2,3)
5	(Denmark) Michael Jepsen Jensen	9	(3,2,0,2,2)
6	(Poland) Piotr Pawlicki Jr.	9	(1,1,3,2,2)
7	(Denmark) Peter Kildemand	8	(3,2,2,1,0)
8	(Czech Republic) Václav Milík Jr.	6	(0,3,1,0,2)
9	(Germany) Kai Huckenbeck	6	(1,2,0,3,D)
10	(Denmark) Leon Madsen	6	(1,0,3,1,1)
11	(Poland) Mateusz Szczepaniak	6	(2,1,0,2,1)
12	(Slovenia) Matej Žagar	6	(2,0,2,1,1)
13	(Russia) Gleb Chugunov	5	(3,0,1,1,0)
14	(Germany) Martin Smolinski	5	(2,1,2,0,0)
15	(Russia) Andrey Kudryashov	2	(-,-,0,0,2)
16	(Russia) Roman Lachbaum	2	(0,0,1,0,1)
17	(Slovakia) Martin Vaculík	1	(1,D,-,-,-)

== See also ==
- 2018 Speedway Grand Prix
