= 2018 Speedway Grand Prix =

24th season of the Speedway Grand Prix

Season details
- Dates: May 12 – October 6
- Events: 10
- Cities: 10
- Countries: 7
- Riders: 15 permanents 1 wild card(s); 2 track reserves
- Heats: 230 (in 10 events)

Winners
- Champion: GBR Tai Woffinden
- Runner-up: POL Bartosz Zmarzlik
- 3rd place: SWE Fredrik Lindgren

The 2018 Speedway Grand Prix season was the 24th season of the Speedway Grand Prix era, and decided the 73rd FIM Speedway World Championship. It was the eighteenth series under the promotion of Benfield Sports International, an IMG company.

The world title was won by Tai Woffinden, who finished 10 points ahead of Bartosz Zmarzlik in second with Fredrik Lindgren taking the bronze medal. It was Woffinden's third world title, following his wins in 2013 and 2015, making him the most successful British rider in history. Defending champion Jason Doyle finished the season in seventh place.

== Qualification ==
For the 2018 season there were 15 permanent riders, joined at each Grand Prix by one wild card and two track reserves.

The top eight riders from the 2017 championship qualified automatically. Those riders were joined by the three riders who qualified via the Grand Prix Challenge.

The final four riders were nominated by series promoters, Benfield Sports International, following the completion of the 2017 season.

=== Qualified riders ===
#	Riders	2017 place	GP Ch place	Appearance	Previous appearances in series
69	(Australia) Jason Doyle	1	—	4th	2015–2017
692	(Poland) Patryk Dudek	2	3	2nd	2016, 2017
108	(United Kingdom) Tai Woffinden	3	—	7th	2010, 2011, 2013–2017
71	(Poland) Maciej Janowski	4	—	4th	2008, 2012, 2014, 2015–2017
95	(Poland) Bartosz Zmarzlik	5	—	3rd	2012–2015, 2016–2017
89	(Russia) Emil Sayfutdinov	6	—	7th	2009–2013, 2017
55	(Slovenia) Matej Žagar	7	12	8th	2003–2005, 2006–2007, 2008–2009, 2011, 2013–2017
66	(Sweden) Fredrik Lindgren	8	—	9th	2004, 2006–2007, 2008–2014, 2016, 2017
54	(Slovakia) Martin Vaculík	9	17	3rd	2012, 2013, 2017
23	(Australia) Chris Holder	10	—	9th	2010–2017
45	(United States) Greg Hancock	14	—	24th	1995–2017
110	(Denmark) Nicki Pedersen	20	—	18th	2000, 2001–2017
59	(Poland) Przemysław Pawlicki	29	1	1st	2010, 2012, 2017
222	(Russia) Artem Laguta	—	2	2nd	2011
111	(United Kingdom) Craig Cook	32	4	1st	2013–2015, 2017

=== Qualified substitutes ===
The following riders were nominated as substitutes:

#	Riders	2017 place	GP Ch place
88	(Denmark) Niels Kristian Iversen	15	—
225	(Czech Republic) Václav Milík Jr.	16	8
53	(Sweden) Linus Sundström	32	—
133	(Poland) Maksym Drabik	—	—
46	(Australia) Max Fricke	18	—

== Calendar ==
The 2018 season consisted of 10 events, two less than the 2017 series.

Round	Date	City and venue	Winner	Runner-up	3rd placed	4th placed	Results
1	May 12	(Poland) Warsaw, Poland; Stadion Narodowy	(United Kingdom) Tai Woffinden	(Poland) Maciej Janowski	(Sweden) Fredrik Lindgren	(Russia) Artem Laguta	results
2	May 26	(Czech Republic) Prague, Czech Republic; Markéta Stadium	(Sweden) Fredrik Lindgren	(Poland) Patryk Dudek	(Russia) Emil Sayfutdinov	(United Kingdom) Tai Woffinden	results
3	June 30	(Denmark) Horsens, Denmark; CASA Arena	(United Kingdom) Tai Woffinden	(Russia) Artem Laguta	(United States) Greg Hancock	(Australia) Jason Doyle	results
4	July 7	(Sweden) Hallstavik, Sweden; HZ Bygg Arena	(Poland) Maciej Janowski	(Sweden) Fredrik Lindgren	(Poland) Bartosz Zmarzlik	(United Kingdom) Tai Woffinden	results
5	July 21	(United Kingdom) Cardiff, Great Britain; Principality Stadium	(Poland) Bartosz Zmarzlik	(United Kingdom) Tai Woffinden	(Poland) Maciej Janowski	(United States) Greg Hancock	results
6	August 11	Målilla, Sweden; G&B Arena	(Denmark) Nicki Pedersen	(Slovenia) Matej Žagar	(Sweden) Fredrik Lindgren	(Slovakia) Martin Vaculík	results
7	August 25	Gorzów Wielkopolski, Poland; Edward Jancarz Stadium	(Slovakia) Martin Vaculík	(Poland) Bartosz Zmarzlik	(United Kingdom) Tai Woffinden	(Poland) Patryk Dudek	results
8	September 8	(Slovenia) Krško, Slovenia; Stadion Matije Gubca	(Poland) Patryk Dudek	(Australia) Jason Doyle	(United States) Greg Hancock	(Sweden) Fredrik Lindgren	results
9	September 22	(Germany) Teterow, Germany; Bergring Arena	(United Kingdom) Tai Woffinden	(Australia) Jason Doyle	(Poland) Bartosz Zmarzlik	(United States) Greg Hancock	results
10	October 6	Toruń, Poland; Rose Motoarena	(United Kingdom) Tai Woffinden	(Russia) Artem Laguta	(Russia) Emil Sayfutdinov	(Denmark) Niels-Kristian Iversen	results

== Final Classification ==
Qualifies for next season's Grand Prix series
Full-time Grand Prix rider
Wild card, track reserve or qualified reserve

Pos.	Rider	Points	POL (Poland)	CZE (Czech Republic)	DEN (Denmark)	SWE (Sweden)	GBR (United Kingdom)	SCA (Sweden)	PL2 (Poland)	SVN (Slovenia)	GER (Germany)	PL3 (Poland)
Gold	(United Kingdom) (108) Tai Woffinden (C)	139	15	16	18	16	16	10	12	5	16	15
Silver	(Poland) (95) Bartosz Zmarzlik	129	9	4	10	13	19	14	18	12	15	15
Bronze	(Sweden) (66) Fredrik Lindgren	109	16	16	7	15	7	13	2	13	9	11
4	(Poland) (71) Maciej Janowski	104	13	11	5	18	12	11	9	10	9	6
5	(United States) (45) Greg Hancock	102	8	7	16	10	12	3	10	15	12	9
6	(Russia) (222) Artem Laguta	97	13	8	12	8	6	6	13	7	4	20
7	(Australia) (69) Jason Doyle	93	5	9	12	9	5	4	9	17	16	7
8	(Russia) (89) Emil Sayfutdinov	89	8	15	11	14	8	6	3	5	8	11
9	(Poland) (692) Patryk Dudek	84	10	14	6	6	10	10	12	16	–	–
10	(Slovenia) (55) Matej Žagar	79	9	7	5	7	6	16	11	–	12	6
11	(Denmark) (110) Nicki Pedersen	74	2	8	12	3	6	15	6	7	8	7
12	(Australia) (23) Chris Holder	65	10	5	9	7	7	5	0	10	7	5
13	(Slovakia) (54) Martin Vaculík	52	–	–	3	1	3	10	18	9	0	8
14	(Denmark) (88) Niels-Kristian Iversen	36	4	5	–	–	–	–	–	5	12	10
15	(Poland) (59) Przemysław Pawlicki	36	3	5	5	1	10	3	3	2	3	1
16	(United Kingdom) (111) Craig Cook	30	2	2	2	3	9	3	4	5	0	–
17	(Czech Republic) (16) Vaclav Milik	11	–	6	–	–	–	–	–	–	–	5
18	(Poland) (16) Szymon Woźniak	8	–	–	–	–	–	–	8	–	–	–
19	(Poland) (16) Krzysztof Kasprzak	7	7	–	–	–	–	–	–	–	–	–
20	(Sweden) (16) Andreas Jonsson	7	–	–	–	7	–	–	–	–	–	–
21	(Sweden) (16) Peter Ljung	5	–	–	–	–	–	5	–	–	–	–
22	(Denmark) (16) Michael Jepsen Jensen	4	–	–	4	–	–	–	–	–	–	–
23	(Sweden) (17) Oliver Berntzon	3	–	–	–	–	–	3	–	–	–	–
24	(Germany) (18) Kevin Wölbert	3	–	–	–	–	–	–	–	–	3	–
25	(Poland) (17) Maksym Drabik	2	2	–	–	–	–	–	–	–	–	–
26	(Poland) (18) Bartosz Smektała	2	2	–	–	–	–	–	–	–	–	–
27	(Germany) (16) Kai Huckenbeck	2	–	–	–	–	–	–	–	–	2	–
28	(Poland) (16) Daniel Kaczmarek	2	–	–	–	–	–	–	–	–	–	2
29	(Denmark) (17) Mikkel Michelsen	1	–	–	1	–	–	–	–	–	–	–
30	(United Kingdom) (16) Robert Lambert	1	–	–	–	–	1	–	–	–	–	–
31	(Sweden) (18) Joel Kling	1	–	–	–	–	–	1	–	–	–	–
32	(Germany) (17) Martin Smolinski	1	–	–	–	–	–	–	–	–	1	–
33	(Denmark) (18) Mikkel Bech Jensen	0	–	–	0	–	–	–	–	–	–	–
34	(United Kingdom) (17) Dan Bewley	0	–	–	–	–	0	–	–	–	–	–
35	(Slovenia) (16) Matic Ivačič	0	–	–	–	–	–	–	–	0	–	–
36	(Slovenia) (17) Nick Škorja	0	–	–	–	–	–	–	–	0	–	–
37	(Poland) (17) Igor Kopeć-Sobczyński	0	–	–	–	–	–	–	–	–	–	0
Pos.	Rider	Points	POL (Poland)	CZE (Czech Republic)	DEN (Denmark)	SWE (Sweden)	GBR (United Kingdom)	SCA (Sweden)	PL2 (Poland)	SVN (Slovenia)	GER (Germany)	PL3 (Poland)

== See also ==
- 2018 Individual Speedway Junior World Championship
