= List of Speedway Grand Prix statistics =

The Speedway Grand Prix are a series of stand-alone motorcycle speedway events over the course of a season used to determine the Speedway World Champion and below are a list of records associated with the event since its inception in 1995. From the 2007-2019 seasons, the format was changed with points scored for every ride instead of the set points scoring system used until 2020 when a new format based on overall positions was introduced with points scored in heats only used to determine a rider's progress in a Grand Prix.

Statistics up to date as of the 2026 Speedway Grand Prix of Poland III.

== Grand Prix wins ==
	Rider	Wins
1	(Poland) Bartosz Zmarzlik	31
2	(Australia) Jason Crump	23
3	(Poland) Tomasz Gollob	22
4	(United States) Greg Hancock	21
5	(Sweden) Tony Rickardsson	20
6	(Denmark) Nicki Pedersen	17
7	(United Kingdom) Tai Woffinden	11
8	(Sweden) Andreas Jonsson	9
	(Slovakia) Martin Vaculík	9
10	(Australia) Leigh Adams	8
	(Poland) Maciej Janowski	8
12	(Russia) Emil Sayfutdinov	7
	(Australia) Jason Doyle	7
	(Sweden) Fredrik Lindgren	7
15	(Denmark) Hans Nielsen	6
	(United States) Billy Hamill	6
	(Poland) Jarosław Hampel	6
	(Russia) Artem Laguta	6
	(Australia) Brady Kurtz	6
20	(Denmark) Niels-Kristian Iversen	5
	(Australia) Chris Holder	5
	(Slovenia) Matej Žagar	5
	(United Kingdom) Dan Bewley	5
	(Denmark) Leon Madsen	5
25	(Australia) Ryan Sullivan	4
	(Denmark) Hans N. Andersen	4
	(United Kingdom) Robert Lambert	4
28	(Denmark) Tommy Knudsen	3
	(Poland) Krzysztof Kasprzak	3
	(Sweden) Antonio Lindbäck	3
	(Poland) Patryk Dudek	3
	(Australia) Max Fricke	3
33	(United Kingdom) Mark Loram	2
	(Norway) / (Poland) Rune Holta	2
	(Denmark) Peter Kildemand	2
	(Australia) Jack Holder	2
	(Denmark) Anders Thomsen	2
38	(Denmark) Brian Andersen	1
	(United Kingdom) Martin Dugard	1
	(Denmark) Bjarne Pedersen	1
	(United Kingdom) Chris Harris	1
	(Denmark) Kenneth Bjerre	1
	(Australia) Darcy Ward	1
	(Denmark) Michael Jepsen Jensen	1
	(Poland) Adrian Miedziński	1
	(Germany) Martin Smolinski	1
	(Poland) Piotr Pawlicki Jr.	1
	(Poland) Janusz Kołodziej	1
	(Denmark) Mikkel Michelsen	1
	(Poland) Kacper Woryna	1

== Grand Prix wins (by country) ==
	Nation	Wins
1	Poland	79
2	Australia	60
3	Denmark	49
4	Sweden	39
5	United States	27
6	(United Kingdom) Great Britain	24
7	Russia	13
8	Slovakia	9
9	Slovenia	5
10	Germany	1

== Grand Prix finals (top 20) ==
	Rider	Finals
1	(United States) Greg Hancock	92
2	(Poland) Bartosz Zmarzlik	79
3	(Australia) Jason Crump	77
4	(Poland) Tomasz Gollob	66
5	(Denmark) Nicki Pedersen	64
6	(Sweden) Fredrik Lindgren	60
7	(Sweden) Tony Rickardsson	52
8	(United Kingdom) Tai Woffinden	47
9	(Australia) Jason Doyle	35
10	(Poland) Jarosław Hampel	32
11	(Poland) Maciej Janowski	31
12	(Russia) Emil Sayfutdinov	30
13	(Australia) Leigh Adams	28
14	(Sweden) Andreas Jonsson	25
	(Australia) Chris Holder	25
16	(Denmark) Leon Madsen	24
17	(Slovenia) Matej Žagar	23
18	(Poland) Patryk Dudek	22
19	(Denmark) Hans N. Andersen	21
	(Slovakia) Martin Vaculík	21

== Grand Prix points (top 20) ==
	Rider	Points
1	(United States) Greg Hancock	2655
2	(Australia) Jason Crump	2006
3	(Poland) Tomasz Gollob	1981
4	(Denmark) Nicki Pedersen	1972
5	(Sweden) Fredrik Lindgren	1887
6	(Poland) Bartosz Zmarzlik	1731
7	(Sweden) Tony Rickardsson	1401
8	(Sweden) Andreas Jonsson	1376
9	(United Kingdom) Tai Woffinden	1365
10	(Australia) Leigh Adams	1277
11	(Australia) Jason Doyle	1114
12	(Russia) Emil Sayfutdinov	1087
13	(Slovenia) Matej Žagar	1003
14	(Poland) Maciej Janowski	981
15	(Poland) Jarosław Hampel	953
16	(Australia) Chris Holder	910
17	(Slovakia) Martin Vaculík	896
18	(Denmark) Leon Madsen	814
19	(Denmark) Hans N. Andersen	780
20	(Denmark) Niels Kristian Iversen	775

== Grand Prix appearances (top 20) ==
	Rider	Appearances
1	(United States) Greg Hancock	218
2	(Sweden) Fredrik Lindgren	189
3	(Denmark) Nicki Pedersen	177
4	(Poland) Tomasz Gollob	163
5	(Sweden) Andreas Jonsson	158
6	(Australia) Jason Crump	145
7	(United Kingdom) Tai Woffinden	131
8	(Slovenia) Matej Žagar	128
9	(Poland) Bartosz Zmarzlik	117
10	(Australia) Leigh Adams	115
11	(Australia) Jason Doyle	115
	(Sweden) Antonio Lindbäck	110
13	(United Kingdom) Chris Harris	104
	(Slovakia) Martin Vaculík	104
15	(Poland) Maciej Janowski	102
16	(Denmark) Niels Kristian Iversen	100
17	(Russia) Emil Sayfutdinov	98
18	(Poland) Jarosław Hampel	96
	(Australia) Chris Holder	96
20	(Norway) / (Poland) Rune Holta	91

== Grand Prix rostrums (top 20) ==
	Rider	Rostrums
1	(United States) Greg Hancock	69
	(Poland) Bartosz Zmarzlik	69
3	(Australia) Jason Crump	56
4	(Poland) Tomasz Gollob	53
5	(Denmark) Nicki Pedersen	48
6	(Sweden) Tony Rickardsson	45
	(Sweden) Fredrik Lindgren	45
8	(United Kingdom) Tai Woffinden	36
9	(Poland) Maciej Janowski	27
10	(Poland) Jarosław Hampel	26
11	(Australia) Jason Doyle	23
12	(Russia) Emil Sayfutdinov	21
	(Denmark) Leon Madsen	21
14	(Australia) Chris Holder	19
	(Slovenia) Matej Žagar	19
16	(Sweden) Andreas Jonsson	18
17	(Slovakia) Martin Vaculík	17
18	(Australia) Leigh Adams	16
	(United States) Billy Hamill	16
	(Denmark) Hans N. Andersen	16

== Grand Prix wins in a single season ==
	Rider	Year	Wins
1	(Sweden) Tony Rickardsson	2005	6
2	(Poland) Bartosz Zmarzlik	2021 & 2023	5
	(Russia) Artem Laguta	2021	5
	(Australia) Brady Kurtz	2025	5
5	(Australia) Jason Crump	2006	4
	(Denmark) Nicki Pedersen	2007	4
	(Poland) Tomasz Gollob	2010	4
	(United States) Greg Hancock	2011	4
	(Australia) Jason Doyle	2016	4
	(United Kingdom) Tai Woffinden	2018	4
	(Poland) Bartosz Zmarzlik	2020	4

== Grand Prix wins in succession ==
	Rider	Year	Wins
1	(Australia) Brady Kurtz	2025	5
2	(Sweden) Tony Rickardsson	2005	4
3	(Australia) Jason Crump	2006	3
	(Australia) Jason Doyle	2016	3
	(Poland) Bartosz Zmarzlik	2021	3
	(Russia) Artem Laguta	2021	3
7	(Sweden) Tony Rickardsson	1998 & 2001	2
	(Australia) Jason Crump	2001 & 2009	2
	(United Kingdom) Tai Woffinden	2014 & 2018	2
	(Poland) Bartosz Zmarzlik	2020, 2022 & 2023	2
	(Denmark) Tommy Knudsen	1995	2
	(Denmark) Hans Nielsen	1996	2
	(Australia) Ryan Sullivan	2002	2
	(Australia) Leigh Adams	2007	2
	(Denmark) Nicki Pedersen	2007	2
	(Poland) Tomasz Gollob	2010	2
	(Russia) Emil Sayfutdinov	2013	2
	(Poland) Maciej Janowski	2017	2
	(Slovenia) Matej Žagar	2017	2
	(Denmark) Leon Madsen	2019	2
	(United Kingdom) Dan Bewley	2022	2
	(United Kingdom) Robert Lambert	2026	2

== Grand Prix finals in a single season ==
	Rider	Year	Finals
1	(Australia) Jason Doyle	2017	10
	(Russia) Artem Laguta	2021	10
3	(Poland) Bartosz Zmarzlik	2024 & 2025	9
	(Denmark) Nicki Pedersen	2008	9
	(Australia) Brady Kurtz	2025	9
6	(United States) Greg Hancock	2011 & 2014	8
	(United Kingdom) Tai Woffinden	2015 & 2018	8
	(Sweden) Tony Rickardsson	2005	8
	(Denmark) Nicki Pedersen	2007	8
	(Poland) Krzysztof Kasprzak	2014	8
	(Poland) Bartosz Zmarzlik	2021 & 2026	8
	(Australia) Brady Kurtz	2026	8

== Grand Prix finals in succession ==
	Rider	Year	Finals
1	(Russia) Artem Laguta	2021	10
2	(Denmark) Nicki Pedersen	2008	9
3	(Poland) Bartosz Zmarzlik	2025	8
4	(Sweden) Tony Rickardsson	2005	7
	(Australia) Jason Crump	2006 & 2009	7
	(United States) Greg Hancock	2014	7
	(Poland) Bartosz Zmarzlik	2021	7
	(Australia) Brady Kurtz	2025 & 2026	7
9	(Australia) Jason Crump	2008	6
	(Poland) Krzysztof Kasprzak	2014	6
	(Australia) Jason Doyle	2017	6
	(Sweden) Fredrik Lindgren	2023	6
	(Poland) Bartosz Zmarzlik	2024 & 2026	6

== Grand Prix points in a single season (top 10) ==
	Rider	Year	Points
1	(Sweden) Tony Rickardsson	2005	196
	(Denmark) Nicki Pedersen	2007	196
3	(Russia) Artem Laguta	2021	192
4	(Poland) Bartosz Zmarzlik	2021	189
5	(Australia) Jason Crump	2006	188
6	(Poland) Bartosz Zmarzlik	2025	183
7	(Australia) Brady Kurtz	2025	182
8	(Sweden) Tony Rickardsson	2002	181
9	(Poland) Bartosz Zmarzlik	2024	179
10	(Denmark) Nicki Pedersen	2008	174

== Grand Prix wins / apps ratio (top 10) ==
	Rider	Wins	Apps	Ratio (%)
1	(Denmark) Tommy Knudsen	3	10	30.00
2	(Australia) Brady Kurtz	6	22	27.27
3	(Poland) Bartosz Zmarzlik	31	117	26.50
4	(Sweden) Tony Rickardsson	20	84	23.81
5	(Denmark) Hans Nielsen	6	30	20.00
6	(Australia) Jason Crump	23	145	15.86
7	(Poland) Tomasz Gollob	22	163	13.50
8	(Russia) Artem Laguta	6	48	12.50
9	(United States) Billy Hamill	6	52	11.54
10	(United Kingdom) Dan Bewley	5	45	11.11

Minimum of 2 Grand Prix wins required.

== Grand Prix appearances without a win (top 10) ==
	Rider	Appearances
1	(United Kingdom) Scott Nicholls	82
2	(Poland) Piotr Protasiewicz	58
3	(Sweden) Mikael Max	56
4	(Sweden) Peter Karlsson	51
5	(United Kingdom) Andy Smith	48
6	(Latvia) Andžejs Ļebedevs	42
7	(United Kingdom) Chris Louis	41
8	(Sweden) Henrik Gustafsson	40
9	(United Kingdom) Lee Richardson	38
10	(Czech Republic) Lukáš Dryml	34

== Grand Prix appearances without a final (top 10) ==
	Rider	Appearances
1	(United Kingdom) Andy Smith	48
2	(Czech Republic) Jan Kvěch	33
	(Germany) Kai Huckenbeck	33
4	(Czech Republic) Bohumil Brhel	22
5	(Czech Republic) Antonín Kasper	21
6	(Denmark) Jesper B. Monberg	20
7	(Czech Republic) Aleš Dryml	19
	(United Kingdom) Carl Stonehewer	19
9	(Slovenia) Matej Ferjan	17
	(Australia) Craig Boyce	17
	(Sweden) Peter Ljung	17

== Oldest riders to win a Grand Prix ==
	Rider	Age
1	(United States) Greg Hancock	46 years, 72 days
2	(Poland) Tomasz Gollob	41 years, 150 days
3	(Denmark) Nicki Pedersen	41 years, 131 days
4	(Denmark) Hans Nielsen	39 years, 246 days
5	(Sweden) Fredrik Lindgren	38 years, 286 days
6	(Australia) Jason Doyle	38 years, 218 days
7	(Australia) Leigh Adams	37 years, 110 days
8	(Norway) / (Poland) Rune Holta	36 years, 350 days
9	(Australia) Jason Crump	36 years, 308 days
10	(Sweden) Tony Rickardsson	35 years, 22 days

== Oldest riders to make a Grand Prix appearance ==
	Rider	Age
1	(United States) Greg Hancock	48 years, 125 days
2	(Poland) Tomasz Gollob	44 years, 7 days
3	(Denmark) Nicki Pedersen	41 years, 187 days
4	(Sweden) Fredrik Lindgren	41 years, 11 days
5	(Australia) Jason Doyle	40 years, 356 days
6	(Norway) Arnt Førland	40 years, 275 days
7	(Hungary) Sandor Tihanyi	40 years, 75 days
8	(Denmark) Hans Nielsen	39 years, 274 days
9	(Sweden) Magnus Zetterstrom	39 years, 242 days
10	(Germany) Martin Smolinski	39 years, 164 days

== See also ==
- 2026 Speedway Grand Prix
- Speedway Grand Prix
