= Joel Kling =

Swedish speedway rider

- Born: 30 April 1997 (age 29); Sweden
- Nationality: Swedish

Career history

Sweden
- 2019-2020: Dackarna

Poland
- 2018: Lublin
- 2019: Gdańsk

Individual honours
- 2018: Swedish U21 champion

Joel Kling (born 30 April 1997) is a former motorcycle speedway rider from Sweden.

== Career ==
Kling represented Sweden at the 2018 Speedway of Nations and was the 2018 Swedish Junior Speedway Championship. In 2021, he announced his retirement at the age of 24.
