= Tai Woffinden =

British speedway rider (born 1990)

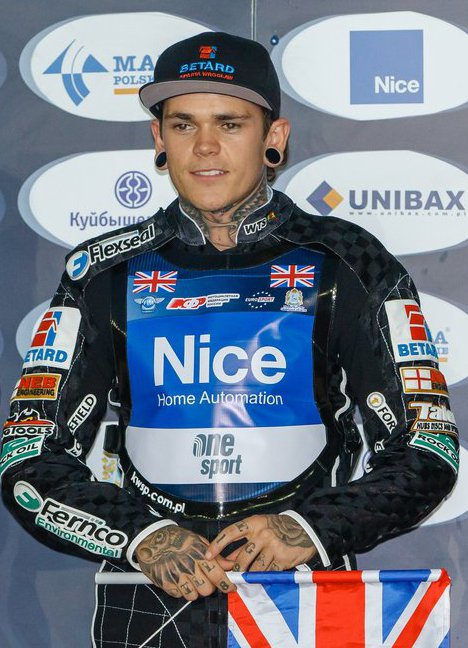
- Born: 10 August 1990 (age 36); Scunthorpe, England
- Nationality: British (English)
- Website: taiwoffinden.com

Career history

Great Britain
- 2006–2007: Scunthorpe Scorpions
- 2007–2008: Rye House Rockets
- 2007: Poole Pirates
- 2009–2014, 2016: Wolverhampton Wolves
- 2023–2025: Sheffield Tigers

Poland
- 2008–2010: Częstochowa
- 2011: Gniezno
- 2012–2024: Wrocław
- 2025: Rzeszów
- 2026: Ostrów

Sweden
- 2009–2011: Vargarna
- 2012, 2021, 2026: Dackarna
- 2014–2016: Elit Vetlanda
- 2017–2018: Masarna
- 2018–2019: Indianerna
- 2023: Västervik

Denmark
- 2022: Esbjerg

Speedway Grand Prix statistics
- SGP number: 108
- Starts: 131
- Finalist: 47 times
- Winner: 11 times

Individual honours
- 2013, 2015, 2018: World Champion
- 2016, 2020: World Championship runner-up
- 2013, 2014, 2015: British Champion
- 2007: Conference League Riders Champion
- 2007: British Under 18 Champion
- 2008: British Under 21 Champion
- 2008: Premier League Riders Champion
- 2019: Western Australian State Champion

Team honours
- 2021: World team champion
- 2016, 2018, 2022, 2023: World team runner-up
- 2009, 2016: UK Elite League champion
- 2014, 2015: Swedish Elitserien champion
- 2024: UK Knockout Cup
- 2007: Premier League (tier 2)
- 2006, 2007: Conference League (tier 3)
- 2006, 2007: Conference KO Cup (tier 3)
- 2006: Conference Shield
- 2006, 2007: Conference Trophy
- 2007: Conference League Fours

Tai Woffinden (born 10 August 1990) is a British former speedway rider. He is a three-time World Champion (2013, 2015 and 2018).

== Early life ==
Woffinden was born in Scunthorpe, the son of former speedway rider Rob Woffinden. Although born in the United Kingdom and competing as a British rider, Woffinden grew up in Perth, Western Australia, after his parents Rob and Sue decided to move there in 1994.

== Career ==
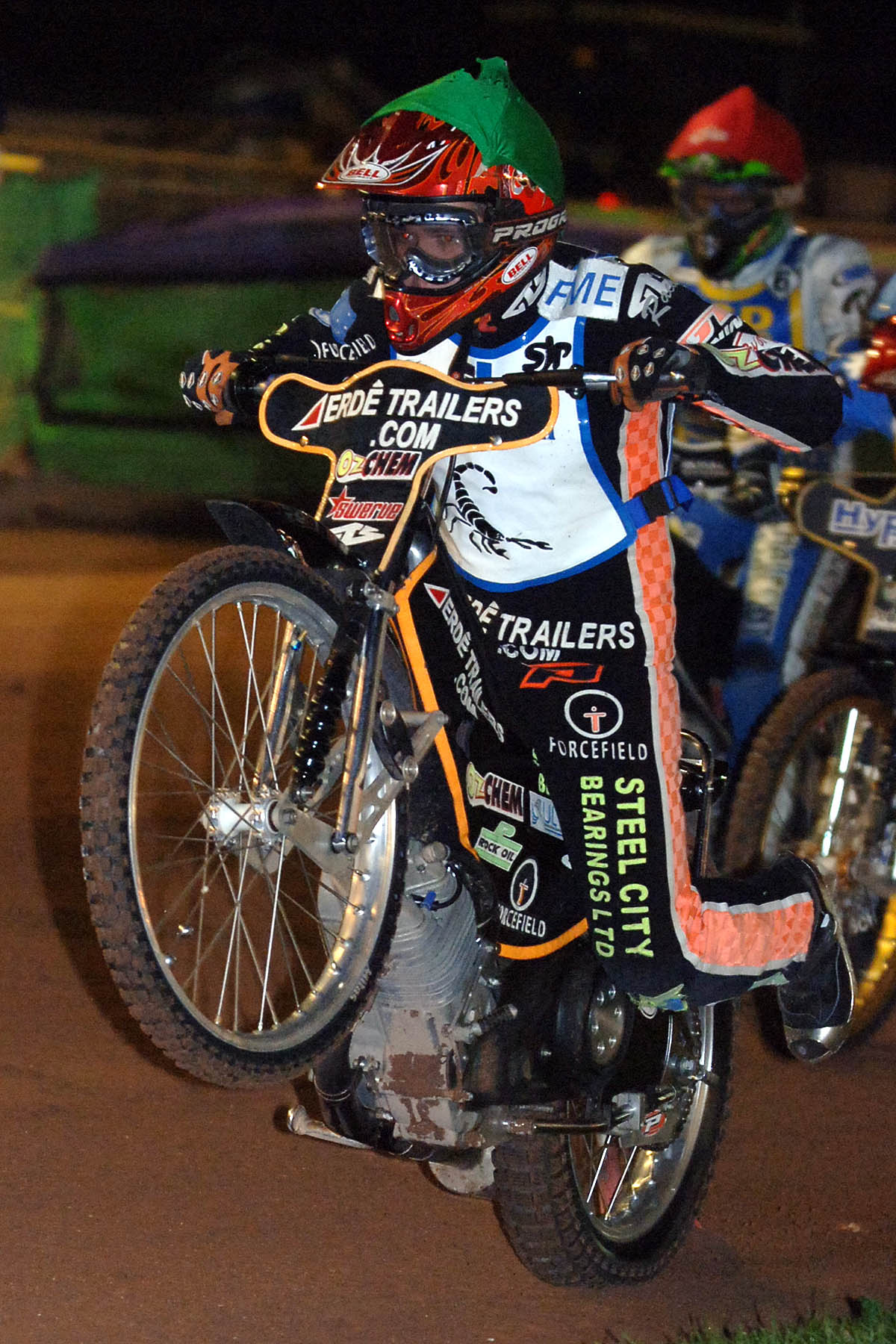
Woffinden riding for Scunthorpe in 2007

Woffinden began his career in junior speedway in Perth where he won the 2006 Western Australian Under-16 title, though he missed riding in the Australian Under-16 Championship in Adelaide. He started his British career with the Scunthorpe Scorpions in the Conference League in 2006. With the Scorpions, he completed a clean sweep of Conference League trophies, winning the Championship, Conference Trophy, Conference Shield and the Knockout Cup. When he turned sixteen years of age, he made his Premier League debut for the Sheffield Tigers as a guest rider. In 2006, he became an asset of Wolverhampton Wolves after he signed a full contract with the Elite League side.

2007 saw Woffinden return to Scunthorpe in the Conference League and he signed on a season's loan with the Rye House Rockets in the Premier League, the Rockets clinched the Premier League Championship in 2007 after beating the Sheffield Tigers in the final. In August 2007 he also signed for the Poole Pirates in the Elite League to ride at reserve, sharing the spot with Rye House Rockets team-mate Steve Boxall for the rest of the season. In 2007, Woffinden became the youngest ever rider to appear in the British Championship Final but suffered injury in a crash and had to withdraw from the meeting. In September 2007, he became the Conference League Riders Champion and then two days later won the British Under 18 Championship.

Woffinden signed for the Rye House Rockets again for the 2008 season and this was also the season he made his debut for Great Britain in the Speedway World Cup, impressing with a win against world class opposition. He also finished third in the British Speedway Championship. This finish qualified Woffinden to be a track reserve at the British Grand Prix but he did not have an opportunity to ride. Woffinden became British Under-21 Champion in 2008. The event was held at the Arena Essex Raceway, with Woffinden only dropping one point in the qualifying heats and winning the final ahead of Adam Roynon and Ben Barker.

An extraordinary season ended with Woffinden winning Premier League Riders Championship, held on 21 September 2008 at Owlerton Stadium. Woffinden was the first rider to hold both the British Under-18 and British Under-21 title during the same season. He was also the first rider to be the British Under 18 Champion for two consecutive seasons.

Woffinden agreed to ride for his parent club, the Wolverhampton Wolves, for the 2009 Elite League season.

On 15 April 2011, Woffinden won the British Under 21 Championship, held at the Arena Essex Raceway. After his father's death from cancer in 2010, the Rob Woffinden Classic has become one of the biggest events for speedway bikes in Western Australia. Woffinden won the Classic named for his late father in 2012 at the 142 metres (155 yd) Pinjar Park Speedway in Perth.

In 2013, Woffinden won the Speedway Grand Prix series to become World Champion. He was the 8th British rider to become World Champion and the first one to hold the British Championship and World Championship in the same year since Gary Havelock in 1992. He was also the youngest World Champion in the modern day GP competition at the time. He also won Motorcycle News Man of the Year Award for 2013. Also in 2013, Woffinden competed in his only European Championship, finishing fifth during the 2013 Speedway European Championship.

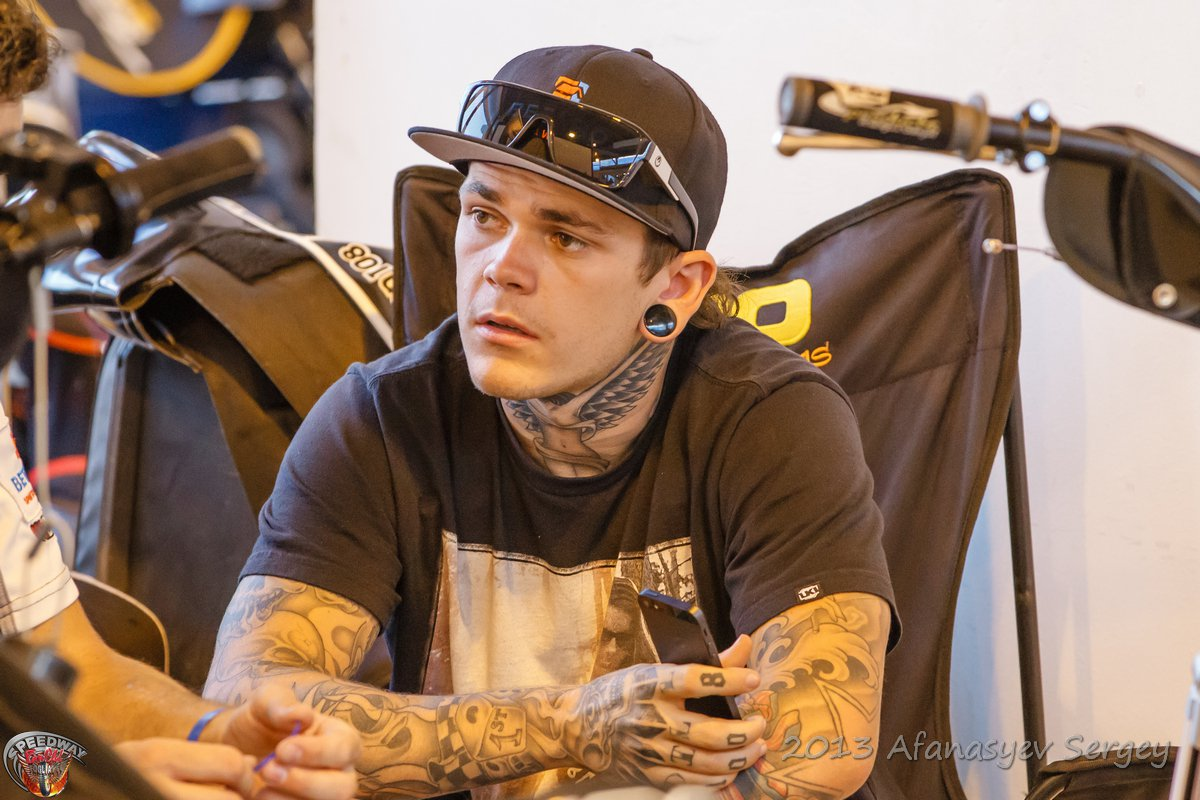

Woffinden captained the Great Britain team that finished fourth in the 2014 Speedway World Cup Final in Bydgoszcz, Poland. Until the end of 2014, he also rode for the Wolverhampton Wolves in the British Elite League, but announced in late 2014 that he would not be riding in Britain during 2015 in his quest to regain his World Championship. After dropping to fourth place in the 2014 Speedway Grand Prix season, Woffinden bounced back in 2015 to regain the Speedway World Championship, becoming the first British rider to win two world individual titles since Peter Craven won his second in 1962. On the way to his second championship success, Woffinden won the Czech Republic and Scandinavian Grand Prix while finishing second in Finland, Sweden and Slovenia and third in Poland II.

In 2016 and 2017, Woffinden finished second and third respectively in the 2017 World Championship and the 2017 World Championship, which included winning a Grand Prix in Warsaw and Gorzów. In 2016, the Speedway World Cup final was held at the national speedway stadium at Belle Vue, Manchester where team GB were runners up to Poland.

In 2018, Woffinden won his third world title ending the 2018 Speedway Grand Prix on 139 points and ten clear of rival Bartosz Zmarzlik. This included four Grand Prix wins in Horsens, Warsaw, Teterow and Torun. After a poor 2019 Championship he bounced back by taking the silver medal during the 2020 Speedway Grand Prix, this time behind Zmarzlik.

In 2021, Woffinden became a team world champion after Great Britain secured the 2021 Speedway of Nations (the world team title). He also the Czech Grand Prix on the way to a sixth-place finish during the 2021 Speedway Grand Prix.

In 2022, Woffinden finished in 8th place during the 2022 Speedway World Championship, after securing 93 points during the 2022 Speedway Grand Prix. Despite finishing outside of the top-six, he was selected by the SGP Commission as one of the riders for the 2023 Speedway Grand Prix.

In 2023, Woffinden signed for Västervik in Sweden, after spending the 2002 season with Esbjerg in Denmark. He also renewed his Polish contract with Sparta Wrocław. In 2023, he was part of the British team that won the silver medal in the 2023 Speedway World Cup final. Shortly afterwards he returned to British speedway, joining Sheffield Tigers as an injury replacement for Jack Holder, who had been injured during the World Cup final. His 2023 season ended badly after he broke his hand when riding well during the British Grand Prix. The injury forced him to miss the last two rounds of the World Championship, which dropped him down into 11th place in the final standings.

In 2024, Woffinden signed for Sheffield. During the Gorzów round of the 2024 Speedway Grand Prix, Woffinden crashed heavily and was taken to hospital with a complicated broken elbow injury, effectively ending his season. Consolation came in the form of a Knockout Cup success with Sheffield, despite missing the final.

On 31 March 2025, it was announced that Woffinden was in an induced coma, following a crash in Poland on Sunday 30 March, sustaining multiple injuries, including a double compound right femur fracture, broken back, a right humerus compound fracture, dislocated right elbow, 12 broken ribs, punctured lung, broken left shoulder blade, dislocated left shoulder and significant blood loss. The speedway community was shocked by the severity of the injuries, with Woffinden's wife Faye stating that she was "deeply grateful for fans' patience, love and support", while Woffinden remained in coma. Woffinden was brought out of coma and was able to leave hospital on 18 April.

On 11 July 2026, following injuries sustained in the Ostrów – Rybnik Speedway 2 Ekstraliga match in May, Woffinden announced that he had decided to retire from professional speedway.

== Major results ==
=== World individual Championship ===
- 2010 Speedway Grand Prix – 14th (49 pts)
- 2011 Speedway Grand Prix – 25th (2 pts)
- 2013 Speedway Grand Prix – Champion (151 pts)
- 2014 Speedway Grand Prix – 4th (121 pts)
- 2015 Speedway Grand Prix – Champion (163 pts)
- 2016 Speedway Grand Prix – 2nd (130 pts)
- 2017 Speedway Grand Prix – 3rd (131 pts)
- 2018 Speedway Grand Prix – Champion (139 pts)
- 2019 Speedway Grand Prix – 13th (60 pts)
- 2020 Speedway Grand Prix – 2nd (117 pts)
- 2021 Speedway Grand Prix – 6th (122 pts)
- 2022 Speedway Grand Prix – 8th (93 pts)
- 2023 Speedway Grand Prix – 11th (64 pts)
- 2024 Speedway Grand Prix – 18th (23 pts)

=== Grand Prix wins ===
- 1: 2013 Speedway Grand Prix of Czech Republic
- 2: 2014 Speedway Grand Prix of Czech Republic
- 3: 2014 Speedway Grand Prix of Sweden
- 4: 2015 Speedway Grand Prix of Czech Republic
- 5: 2015 Speedway Grand Prix of Scandinavia
- 6: 2016 Speedway Grand Prix of Poland (Warsaw)
- 7: 2017 Speedway Grand Prix of Poland II (Gorzów)
- 8: 2018 Speedway Grand Prix of Poland (Warsaw)
- 9: 2018 Speedway Grand Prix of Denmark
- 10: 2018 Speedway Grand Prix of Germany
- 11: 2018 Speedway Grand Prix of Poland III (Toruń)

=== World team Championships ===
- 2008 Speedway World Cup – 5th
- 2009 Speedway World Cup – 5th
- 2010 Speedway World Cup – 4th
- 2011 Speedway World Cup – 6th
- 2012 Speedway World Cup – 5th
- 2013 Speedway World Cup – 7th
- 2014 Speedway World Cup – 4th
- 2015 Speedway World Cup – 5th
- 2016 Speedway World Cup – 2nd
- 2018 Speedway of Nations – 2nd
- 2019 Speedway of Nations – 7th
- 2021 Speedway of Nations – Champion
- 2022 Speedway of Nations – 2nd
- 2023 Speedway World Cup – 2nd

== See also ==
- Great Britain national speedway team
