= Fredrik Lindgren (speedway rider) =

Swedish motorcycle speedway rider (born 1985)

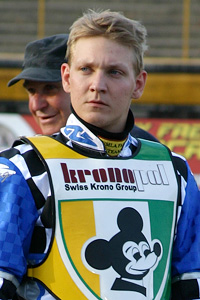
- Born: 15 September 1985 (age 41); Örebro, Sweden
- Nickname: Freddie
- Nationality: Swedish

Career history

Sweden
- 2001–2002: Team Viking/Vikingarna
- 2002–2003, 2014–2016: Indianerna
- 2003: Piraterna
- 2004–2006: Masarna
- 2007–2013, 2017: Dackarna
- 2018–2019: Smederna
- 2021–2023, 2025: Västervik

Great Britain
- 2003–2013, 2015–2017: Wolverhampton Wolves
- 2024: Birmingham Brummies

Poland
- 2007–2010: Zielona Góra
- 2011: Tarnów
- 2012: Wrocław
- 2013: Leszno
- 2014: Gdańsk
- 2015: Daugavpils
- 2017: Rybnik
- 2018–2022: Częstochowa
- 2023–2025: Lublin

Speedway Grand Prix statistics
- SGP number: 66
- Starts: 189
- Finalist: 60 times
- Winner: 7 times

Individual honours
- 2023: World Championship silver
- 2018, 2020, 2024: World Championship bronze
- 2010, 2016, 2017: Elite League Riders' champion
- 2006: Nordic champion
- 2018, 2021, 2023, 2024, 2025: Swedish champion
- 2003, 2004: Swedish U21 champion
- 2004: Nordic Under 21 champion

Team honours
- 2015: World Cup Winner
- 2009, 2016: Elite League Champion
- 2007, 2018, 2019, 2025: Elitserien Champion
- 2003: Allsvenskan Champion
- 2002: Division One (East) Winner
- 2009, 2023, 2024: Polish champions

Jan Fredrik Tobias (Freddie) Lindgren (born 15 September 1985) is a Swedish motorcycle speedway rider. He has won the silver medal and the bronze medal twice at the Speedway World Championship, in addition to the world team championship in 2015.

== Career ==
Born in Örebro, Sweden. Lindgren's father Tommy Lindgren was a speedway rider before him, and his younger brother Ludvig also rides. Lindgren first appeared for Wolverhampton Wolves during the 2003 season as the team struggled with injuries. At the age of just 17, Lindgren made his debut for the team and impressed enough to be brought back the following season when again injuries hit the club.

In 2005, Lindgren moved over to full-time and averaged 7.44 for Wolves in his debut full season and in 2006 he improved to average 8.12. In 2007, as Freddie started to show up more on the World scene, he averaged 8.35 again for Wolves. Also in 2007, he was awarded a permanent wild card place for the 2008 Speedway Grand Prix series. During the 2008 season, Lindgren was awarded with the Wolves captaincy role, previously held by fellow Swede Peter Karlsson and as a full-time Grand Prix rider he averaged 8.52 for Wolves. Due to his top-ten finish in the 2008 SGP, Lindgren was awarded a second successive permanent wild card place for the 2009 Speedway Grand Prix.

In 2010, Lindgren finished 11th on 87 points but qualified for the 2011 Series after beating Janusz Kolodiej and Magnus Zetterstrom in a run-off in the GP Challenge Final.

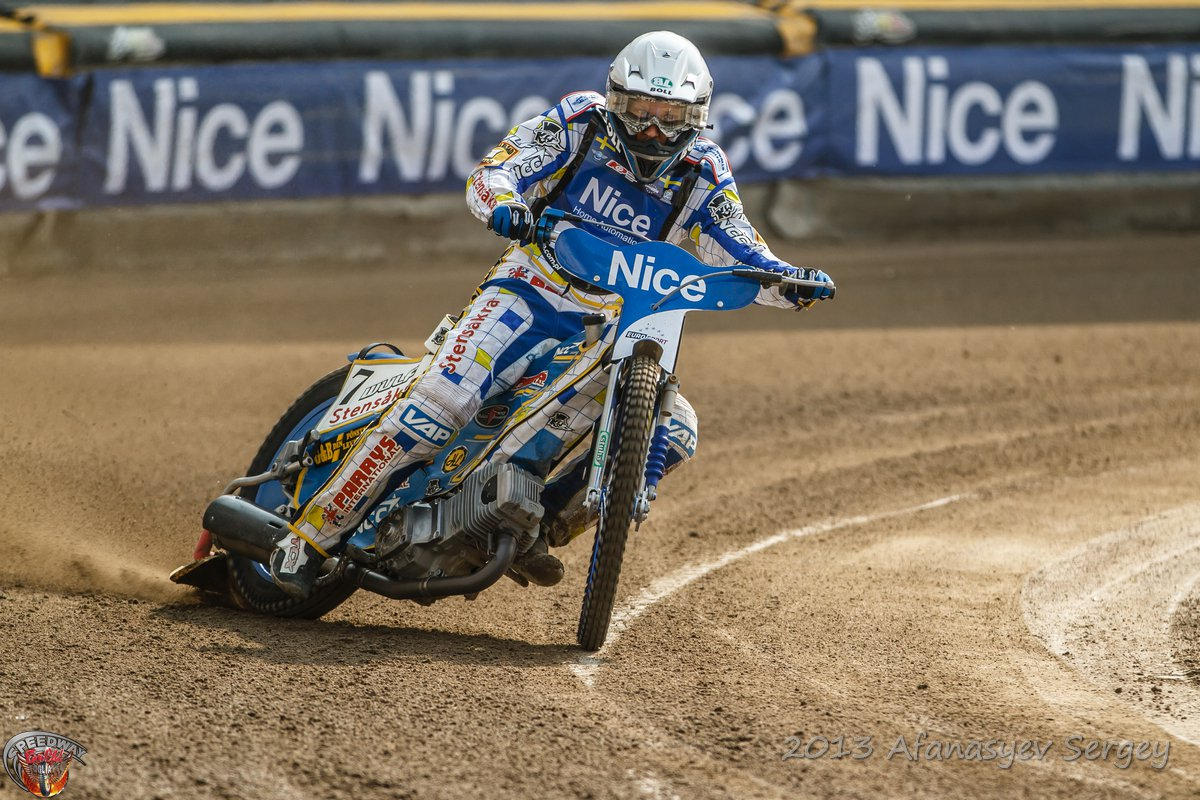
2012

In 2009, Lindgren topped the averages in the UK with a 10.43 average and only dropped seven points at home all season. Wolverhampton went on to win the Elite League title. 2010 saw him again back at Wolverhampton where his brother Ludvig also gained a place. He once again finished as the highest averaging rider in the Elite League and helped Wolves reach the title playoffs.

During the 2015 Speedway World Cup, Lindgren was part of the Swedish team that won the world team title. He had previously finished runner-up twice (2005 & 2006) and third three times. In 2016, Lindgren won the Elite League with Wolves and also won the Elite League Riders' Championship at the end of the season. Lindgren's 2017 season for Wolves would be his last in the United Kingdom, bringing a 14 year spell to an end. He did however, win the Riders' Championship for the third time in 2017.

In 2020, Lindgren finished third and won the bronze medal in the World Championship for the second time, the 2020 Speedway Grand Prix season saw him collect 117 points including winning the Gorzów Grand Prix.

In 2021, Lindgren rode for Västervik Speedway but was later diagnosed with Long COVID and was forced to end his season early. Despite the illness, he managed to finish in fourth place during the 2021 Speedway Grand Prix. In 2022, Lindgren finished in fourth place again in the 2022 Speedway World Championship, after securing 103 points during the 2022 Speedway Grand Prix.

In May 2023, Lindgren won the Speedway Grand Prix of Poland as part of the 2023 Speedway Grand Prix and then secured his third Swedish Individual Speedway Championship title in June. Later in 2023, he went on to claim his best career finish in a World Championship after winning the silver medal.

In 2024, Lindgren returned to racing in Great Britain for the first time since 2017, when signing for the Birmingham Brummies in the SGB Premiership. He also won his fourth Swedish Individual Speedway Championship title and won his seventh career Grand Prix, when winning the Gorzów Grand Prix. Also in 2024, he helped Sweden secure a bronze medal at the 2024 Speedway of Nations in Manchester.

Continuing the success, Lindgren secured the bronze medal in the 2024 World Championship before helping Lublin win the Ekstraliga during the 2024 Polish speedway season. In 2025, he finished fourth in the World Championship and helped Västervik win the Elitserien.

== Major results ==
=== World individual Championship ===
- 2004 Speedway Grand Prix – 30th (4 pts)
- 2006 Speedway Grand Prix – 19th (7 pts)
- 2007 Speedway Grand Prix – 16th (21 pts)
- 2008 Speedway Grand Prix – 10th (73 pts)
- 2009 Speedway Grand Prix – 9th (94 pts)
- 2010 Speedway Grand Prix – 11th (87 pts)
- 2011 Speedway Grand Prix – 9th (90 pts)
- 2012 Speedway Grand Prix – 8th (119 pts)
- 2013 Speedway Grand Prix – 11th (83 pts)
- 2014 Speedway Grand Prix – 10th (90 pts)
- 2016 Speedway Grand Prix – 11th (88 pts)
- 2017 Speedway Grand Prix – 8th (107 pts)
- 2018 Speedway Grand Prix – 3rd (109 pts)
- 2019 Speedway Grand Prix – 4th (105 pts)
- 2020 Speedway Grand Prix – 3rd (117 pts)
- 2021 Speedway Grand Prix – 5th (129 pts)
- 2022 Speedway Grand Prix – 4th (103 pts)
- 2023 Speedway Grand Prix – 2nd (150 pts)
- 2024 Speedway Grand Prix – 3rd (141 pts)
- 2025 Speedway Grand Prix – 4th (134 pts)
- 2026 Speedway Grand Prix – 15th (36 pts)

=== Grand Prix wins ===
- 1: 2012 Speedway Grand Prix of Sweden
- 2: 2017 Speedway Grand Prix of Poland (Warsaw)
- 3: 2018 Speedway Grand Prix of Czech Republic
- 4: 2019 Speedway Grand Prix of Scandinavia
- 5: 2020 Speedway Grand Prix of Poland (Gorzów)
- 6: 2023 Speedway Grand Prix of Poland (Warsaw)
- 7: 2024 Speedway Grand Prix of Poland (Gorzów)

=== World team Championships ===
- 2005 Speedway World Cup - runner up
- 2006 Speedway World Cup - runner up
- 2007 Speedway World Cup - 5th
- 2008 Speedway World Cup - 3rd
- 2009 Speedway World Cup - 3rd
- 2010 Speedway World Cup - 3rd
- 2011 Speedway World Cup - 3rd
- 2012 Speedway World Cup - 4th
- 2015 Speedway World Cup - Winner
- 2016 Speedway World Cup - 3rd
- 2017 Speedway World Cup - runner up
- 2018 Speedway of Nations - 6th
- 2019 Speedway of Nations - 5th
- 2020 Speedway of Nations - 4th
- 2022 Speedway of Nations - runner up
- 2023 Speedway World Cup - 5th
- 2024 Speedway of Nations - 3rd

== See also ==
- List of Speedway Grand Prix riders
