= Craig Cook =

British speedway rider

- Born: 21 May 1987 (age 39); Whitehaven, England
- Nickname: Cookie
- Nationality: British (English)

Career history
- 2008: Scunthorpe
- 2009–2010: Buxton
- 2009–2010, 2017, 2024: Workington
- 2010, 2016: Peterborough
- 2011–2015, 2023: Edinburgh
- 2011, 2013–2018: Belle Vue
- 2018–2022: Glasgow
- 2019–2021: King's Lynn
- 2022: Sheffield
- 2023–2024: Leicester
- 2025: Berwick
- 2025: Oxford

Speedway Grand Prix statistics
- Starts: 13
- Podiums: 0 (0-0-0)
- Finalist: 0 times
- Winner: 0 times

Individual honours
- 2009: National League Riders Champion
- 2012: Premier League Riders Champion
- 2013: Scottish Open Champion
- 2017: British Champion
- 2018: Riders Champion

Team honours
- 2009: Young Shield Winner
- 2019: SGB Championship Pairs
- 2013, 2015: Premier League Fours

Craig William Cook (born 21 May 1987) is a motorcycle speedway rider from England.

== Career ==
Born in Whitehaven, Cook's speedway career began in 2008. In 2009, Cook won the National League Riders Championship, held on 26 September at Rye House Stadium. He rode for Peterborough Panthers in 2010.

Cook moved on to Edinburgh Monarchs, who he rode for in the Premier League between 2011 and 2015. As an Edinburgh rider, he won the Premier League Riders Championship, held on 14 October 2012 at Owlerton Stadium. He was twice part of the Edinburgh team that won the Premier League Four-Team Championship, which were held on 14 July 2013, at the East of England Arena and 1 October 2015, at the Media Prime Arena respectively.

Cook was part of the Belle Vue Aces team that competed in the Elite League from 2011 until 2018. He finished second in the 2014 British Speedway Championship and the 2015 British Speedway Championship.

Cook's domestic success as also seen him recognised internationally, with appearances in the 2013, 2014, 2015 and 2017 Speedway Grand Prix of Great Britain, and he was a member of the Great Britain team that finished fourth in 2014 Speedway World Cup. In 2017, he became the British Champion.

In 2018, Cook became a full-time member of the Speedway Grand Series after being given a qualification position after he had finished fourth in the Speedway Grand Prix Challenge Final. This was due to Patryk Dudek, who finished third in the SGP Challenge Final meeting, and also finishing second in the 2017 Speedway Grand Prix Series.

Cook joined Glasgow Tigers in the SGB Championship in 2018 and would stay with them until 2022. As a Glasgow rider, Cook won the Riders' Championship for the second time. The final was held on 2 September at Owlerton Stadium.

In 2019, Cook left Peterborough to join the King's Lynn Stars and enjoyed a good season, finishing sixth in the SGB Premiership 2019 averages. Also in 2019, he won the SGB Championship Pairs partnering Rasmus Jensen for Glasgow, during the SGB Championship 2019 season.

In 2021, Cook rode in the top tier of British Speedway, riding for the King's Lynn Stars in the SGB Premiership 2021. In 2022, he rode for the Sheffield Tigers in the SGB Premiership 2022 and for Glasgow in the SGB Championship 2022.

In 2023, Cook returned to the Edinburgh Monarchs for the SGB Championship 2023, he had previously been with them from 2011 to 2015. He re-signed for Workington (another former team) for the 2024 season and later joined Leicester again in June.

Cook signed for Oxford Spires and Berwick Bandits for the 2025 Premiership and Championship seasons.
