= 2015 Speedway Grand Prix of Latvia =

2015 Rietumu Bank Latvian FIM Speedway Grand Prix
- Venue: Latvijas Spīdveja Centrs
- Location: Daugavpils (Latvia)
- Start date: 18 July 2015
- Competitors: 16 (2 reserves)

The 2015 Rietumu Bank Latvian FIM Speedway Grand Prix was the fifth race of the 2015 Speedway Grand Prix season. It took place on July 18 at the Latvijas Spīdveja Centrs in Daugavpils, Latvia.

== Riders ==
First reserve Peter Kildemand replaced Jarosław Hampel, who had injured himself during the 2015 Speedway World Cup. The Speedway Grand Prix Commission nominated Kjasts Puodžuks as the wild card, and Andžejs Ļebedevs and Jevgeņijs Kostigovs both as Track Reserves.

== Results ==
The Grand Prix was won by Maciej Janowski, who beat Nicki Pedersen, Troy Batchelor and Chris Holder. After heavy rain, the meeting was abandoned after 20 heats, with each rider having ridden five times. The result stood, as per FIM rule 077.1.4.1., shown below. As a result, second placed Pedersen reduced the deficit to Tai Woffinden to just nine points in the race for the world title.

If a Grand Prix meeting is interrupted or suspended for any reason whatsoever,

the following rules will apply:

1. (...)
2. If the meeting is interrupted before heat 20 is accomplished and the remaining heats cannot be completed, then the race points scored at the completion of heat 16 will determine the result.
3. (...)

— Speedway Grand Prix Regulation, Rule 077.1.4.1, FIM (page 7 and 8)

=== Heat details ===
Placing	Draw	Rider	Total	1	2	3	4	5	6	7	8	9	10	11	12	13	14	15	16	17	18	19	20	Pts	Pos	21	22	23
Gold	2	(Poland) (71) Maciej Janowski	12	2					2				3				3				2			12	1
Silver	9	(Denmark) (3) Nicki Pedersen	11			3		1						3					3		1			11	2
Bronze	6	(Australia) (75) Troy Batchelor	11		3				3			3							1			1		11	3
4	13	(Australia) (23) Chris Holder	10				3	0							3		1					3		10	4
5	5	(United States) (45) Greg Hancock	10		0			2					2					3					3	10	5
6	1	(Australia) (69) Jason Doyle	8	3				3				0				0				2				8	6
7	11	(United Kingdom) (108) Tai Woffinden	8			2				3		1					0						2	8	7
8	10	(Denmark) (19) Peter Kildemand	8			1			1						2			1		3				8	8
9	16	(Denmark) (88) Niels-Kristian Iversen	8				2				2	2						2			0			8	9
10	4	(Denmark) (52) Michael Jepsen Jensen	7	0							3				1				2				1	7	10
11	7	(Sweden) (30) Thomas H. Jonasson	7		1					2					0	1					3			7	11
12	8	(Sweden) (100) Andreas Jonsson	7		2						1			1			2			1				7	12
13	3	(Slovenia) (55) Matej Žagar	6	1						1				2				0				2		6	13
14	14	(United Kingdom) (37) Chris Harris	4				1		0					0		3							0	4	14
15	12	(Latvia) (16) Kjasts Puodžuks	3			0					0		1			2						0		3	15
16	15	(Poland) (507) Krzysztof Kasprzak	0				0			0			0						0	0				0	16
Placing	Draw	Rider	Total	1	2	3	4	5	6	7	8	9	10	11	12	13	14	15	16	17	18	19	20	Pts	Pos	21	22	23

e: retired or mechanical failure • m: exclusion for exceeding two minute time allowance • t: exclusion for touching the tapes • x: other exclusion • f: fell
ns: non-starter • nc: non-classify
Semi-finals: Heat 21: Riders placed 1st, 4th, 6th & 7th in the intermediate classification (after 20 heats)
Heat 22: Riders placed 2nd, 3rd, 5th & 8th in the intermediate classification (after 20 heats)
Big Final (heat 23): The first and second placed riders in each of the Semi-Finals

gate A – inside	gate B	gate C	gate D – outside

== Intermediate Classification ==
Qualifies for next season's Grand Prix series
Full-time Grand Prix rider
Wild card, track reserve or qualified reserve

Pos.	Rider	Points	POL (Poland)	FIN (Finland)	CZE (Czech Republic)	GBR (United Kingdom)	LVA (Latvia)	SWE (Sweden)	DEN (Denmark)	PL2 (Poland)	SVN (Slovenia)	SCA (Sweden)	POL (Poland)	AUS (Australia)
Gold	(United Kingdom) (108) Tai Woffinden	63	5	17	18	15	8							
Silver	(Denmark) (3) Nicki Pedersen	54	3	16	15	9	11							
Bronze	(United States) (45) Greg Hancock	49	5	9	13	12	10							
4	(Denmark) (88) Niels-Kristian Iversen	43	7	6	8	14	8							
5	(Australia) (23) Chris Holder	41	0	7	6	18	10							
6	(Slovenia) (55) Matej Žagar	40	8	7	9	10	6							
7	(Poland) (71) Maciej Janowski	38	3	2	18	3	12							
8	(Australia) (69) Jason Doyle	37	4	11	7	7	8							
9	(Denmark) (52) Michael Jepsen Jensen	34	5	10	4	8	7							
10	(Sweden) (100) Andreas Jonsson	33	3	12	9	2	7							
11	(Poland) (33) Jarosław Hampel	31	7	11	13	–	–							
12	(Australia) (75) Troy Batchelor	28	0	7	6	4	11							
13	(United Kingdom) (37) Chris Harris	27	7	6	5	5	4							
14	(Sweden) (30) Thomas H. Jonasson	23	4	4	1	7	7							
15	(Poland) (507) Krzysztof Kasprzak	21	3	10	4	4	0							
16	(Denmark) (19) Peter Kildemand	20	–	–	–	12	8							
17	(United Kingdom) (16) Craig Cook	7	–	–	–	7	–							
18	(Poland) (16) Tomasz Gollob	4	4	–	–	–	–							
19	(Poland) (17) Bartosz Zmarzlik	3	3	–	–	–	–							
20	(Finland) (16) Timo Lahti	3	–	3	–	–	–							
21	(Latvia) (16) Kjastas Puodzuks	3	–	–	–	–	3							
22	(Czech Republic) (16) Vaclav Milik	2	–	–	2	–	–							
23	(Poland) (18) Piotr Pawlicki Jr.	1	1	–	–	–	–							
24	(United Kingdom) (18) Robert Lambert	1	–	–	–	1	–							
25	(Finland) (17) Nike Lunna	0	–	0	–	–	–							
26	(Finland) (18) Jiri Nieminen	0	–	0	–	–	–							
27	(Czech Republic) (17) Matěj Kůs	0	–	–	0	–	–							
28	(Czech Republic) (18) Josef Franc	0	–	–	0	–	–							
29	(United Kingdom) (17) Jason Garrity	0	–	–	–	0	–							
Pos.	Rider	Points	POL (Poland)	FIN (Finland)	CZE (Czech Republic)	GBR (United Kingdom)	LVA (Latvia)	SWE (Sweden)	DEN (Denmark)	PL2 (Poland)	SVN (Slovenia)	SCA (Sweden)	POL (Poland)	AUS (Australia)

== See also ==
- Motorcycle speedway
