= 2015 Speedway Grand Prix of Poland III =

Speedway race in Poland

2015 Speedway Grand Prix of Poland
- 2015 FST Grupa Brokerska Toruń FIM Speedway Grand Prix of Poland

Information
- Date: 3 October 2015
- City: (Poland) Toruń
- Event: 11 of 12
- Referee: (Sweden) Krister Gardell

Stadium details
- Stadium: MotoArena
- Capacity: 15,500
- Length: 325 m (355 yd)

SGP Results
- Best Time: (in Heat 4)
- (gold) Winner: (Denmark) Nicki Pedersen
- (silver) Runner-up: (Australia) Jason Doyle
- (bronze) 3rd place: (Poland) Maciej Janowski

The 2015 FST Grupa Brokerska Toruń FIM Speedway Grand Prix of Poland was the 11th race of the 2015 Speedway Grand Prix season. It took place on October 3 at the MotoArena in Toruń, Poland.

== Results ==
The Grand Prix was won by Nicki Pedersen, who beat Jason Doyle, Maciej Janowski and Niels-Kristian Iversen in the final. Doyle had initially top scored during the heats, beating Pedersen on countback after both riders had scored 13 points. However, Pedersen had the edge in the deciding race and claimed his third Grand Prix win of the season. Overall, Tai Woffinden was crowned world champion with one round remaining. He failed to reach the semi-finals, however Greg Hancock was eliminated in the semi-finals. This maintained Woffinden's now unassailable 25-point lead at the top of the standings.

=== Heat details ===
Placing	Draw	Rider	Total	1	2	3	4	5	6	7	8	9	10	11	12	13	14	15	16	17	18	19	20	Pts	Pos	21	22	23
Gold	12	(Denmark) (3) Nicki Pedersen	19			2					3		3			2						3		13	2		3	3
Silver	11	(Australia) (69) Jason Doyle	18			3				3		2					2						3	13	1	3		2
Bronze	1	(Poland) (71) Maciej Janowski	11	0				3				1				3				1				8	7	2		1
4	14	(Denmark) (88) Niels-Kristian Iversen	10				2		1					3		0							2	8	8		2	0
5	10	(Sweden) (100) Andreas Jonsson	11			1			3						2			3		2				11	3		0
6	6	(Australia) (23) Chris Holder	11		3				0			3							2			2		10	4	1
7	2	(Denmark) (19) Peter Kildemand	11	2					2				2				1				3			10	5		1
8	15	(United States) (45) Greg Hancock	8				3			1			1						3	0				8	6	0
9	7	(United Kingdom) (108) Tai Woffinden	8		1					2					3	1					1			8	9
10	8	(Poland) (17) Piotr Pawlicki Jr.	7		2						0			2			0			3				7	10
11	13	(Slovenia) (55) Matej Žagar	7				1	1							1		3					1		7	11
12	4	(Denmark) (52) Michael Jepsen Jensen	5	3							2				0				0				0	5	12
13	5	(Sweden) (30) Thomas H. Jonasson	5		0			2					0					2					1	5	13
14	16	(Australia) (75) Troy Batchelor	3				0				1	0						0			2			3	14
15	3	(United Kingdom) (37) Chris Harris	3	1						0				1				1				0		3	15
16	9	(Poland) (507) Krzysztof Kasprzak	1			0		0						0					1		0			1	16
Placing	Draw	Rider	Total	1	2	3	4	5	6	7	8	9	10	11	12	13	14	15	16	17	18	19	20	Pts	Pos	21	22	23

e: retired or mechanical failure • m: exclusion for exceeding two minute time allowance • t: exclusion for touching the tapes • x: other exclusion • f: fell
ns: non-starter • nc: non-classify
Semi-finals: Heat 21: Riders placed 1st, 4th, 6th & 7th in the intermediate classification (after 20 heats)
Heat 22: Riders placed 2nd, 3rd, 5th & 8th in the intermediate classification (after 20 heats)
Big Final (heat 23): The first and second placed riders in each of the Semi-Finals

gate A – inside	gate B	gate C	gate D – outside

== The intermediate classification ==
Qualifies for next season's Grand Prix series
Full-time Grand Prix rider
Wild card, track reserve or qualified reserve

Pos.	Rider	Points	POL (Poland)	FIN (Finland)	CZE (Czech Republic)	GBR (United Kingdom)	LVA (Latvia)	SWE (Sweden)	DEN (Denmark)	PL2 (Poland)	SLO (Slovenia)	SCA (Sweden)	POL (Poland)	AUS (Australia)
Gold	(United Kingdom) (108) Tai Woffinden (C)	151	5	17	18	15	8	17	11	18	18	16	8	
Silver	(United States) (45) Greg Hancock	126	5	9	13	12	10	9	7	17	20	16	8	
Bronze	(Denmark) (3) Nicki Pedersen	124	3	16	15	9	11	17	7	7	13	7	19	
4	(Denmark) (88) Niels-Kristian Iversen	105	7	6	8	14	8	10	7	10	11	14	10	
5	(Australia) (69) Jason Doyle	103	4	11	7	7	8	11	12	6	11	8	18	
6	(Slovenia) (55) Matej Žagar	100	8	7	9	10	6	13	12	16	8	4	7	
7	(Poland) (71) Maciej Janowski	95	3	2	18	3	12	8	12	5	9	12	11	
8	(Australia) (23) Chris Holder	93	0	7	6	18	10	10	10	8	9	4	11	
9	(Denmark) (19) Peter Kildemand	79	–	–	–	12	8	3	14	9	13	9	11	
10	(Denmark) (52) Michael Jepsen Jensen	77	5	10	4	8	7	7	13	10	2	6	5	
11	(Sweden) (100) Andreas Jonsson	76	3	12	9	2	7	5	7	6	4	10	11	
12	(Australia) (75) Troy Batchelor	57	0	7	6	4	11	2	6	4	9	5	3	
13	(United Kingdom) (37) Chris Harris	55	7	6	5	5	4	5	2	5	4	9	3	
14	(Sweden) (30) Thomas H. Jonasson	51	4	4	1	7	7	7	7	1	2	6	5	
15	(Poland) (507) Krzysztof Kasprzak	36	3	10	4	4	0	0	4	1	3	6	1	
16	(Poland) (33) Jarosław Hampel	31	7	11	13	–	–	–	–	–	–	–	–	–
17	(Sweden) (16) Antonio Lindback	20	–	–	–	–	–	14	–	–	–	6	–	–
18	(Poland) (17,16) Bartosz Zmarzlik	17	3	–	–	–	–	–	–	14	–	–	–	–
19	(Poland) (18,17) Piotr Pawlicki Jr.	8	1	–	–	–	–	–	–	–	–	–	7	–
20	(United Kingdom) (16) Craig Cook	7	–	–	–	7	–	–	–	–	–	–	–	–
21	(Denmark) (16) Mikkel Michelsen	6	–	–	–	–	–	–	6	–	–	–	–	–
22	(Poland) (16) Tomasz Gollob	4	4	–	–	–	–	–	–	–	–	–	–	–
23	(Finland) (16) Timo Lahti	3	–	3	–	–	–	–	–	–	–	–	–	–
23	(Latvia) (16) Kjastas Puodzuks	3	–	–	–	–	3	–	–	–	–	–	–	–
25	(Czech Republic) (16) Vaclav Milik	2	–	–	2	–	–	–	–	–	–	–	–	–
26	(United Kingdom) (18) Robert Lambert	1	–	–	–	1	–	–	–	–	–	–	–	–
26	(Poland) (17) Adrian Cyfer	1	–	–	–	–	–	–	–	1	–	–	–	–
26	(Slovenia) (16) Aleksander Conda	1	–	–	–	–	–	–	–	–	1	–	–	–
26	(Slovenia) (17) Denis Stojs	1	–	–	–	–	–	–	–	–	1	–	–	–
30	(Finland) (17) Nike Lunna	0	–	0	–	–	–	–	–	–	–	–	–	–
30	(Finland) (18) Jiri Nieminen	0	–	0	–	–	–	–	–	–	–	–	–	–
30	(Czech Republic) (17) Matěj Kůs	0	–	–	0	–	–	–	–	–	–	–	–	–
30	(Czech Republic) (18) Josef Franc	0	–	–	0	–	–	–	–	–	–	–	–	–
30	(United Kingdom) (17) Jason Garrity	0	–	–	–	0	–	–	–	–	–	–	–	–
Pos.	Rider	Points	POL (Poland)	FIN (Finland)	CZE (Czech Republic)	GBR (United Kingdom)	LVA (Latvia)	SWE (Sweden)	DEN (Denmark)	PL2 (Poland)	SLO (Slovenia)	SCA (Sweden)	POL (Poland)	AUS (Australia)

== See also ==
- motorcycle speedway
