= 2015 Speedway Grand Prix of Slovenia =

- 2015 Mitas Slovenian FIM Speedway Grand Prix

Information
- Date: 12 September 2015
- City: (Slovenia) Krško
- Event: 9 of 12
- Referee: (Poland) Marek Wojaczek

Stadium details
- Stadium: Matija Gubec Stadium
- Capacity: 12,000
- Length: 387.7 m (424.0 yd)

SGP Results
- Best Time: (in Heat 4)
- (gold) Winner: (United States) Greg Hancock
- (silver) Runner-up: (United Kingdom) Tai Woffinden
- (bronze) 3rd place: (Denmark) Peter Kildemand

The 2015 Mitas Slovenian FIM Speedway Grand Prix was the ninth race of the 2015 Speedway Grand Prix season. It took place on September 12 at the Matija Gubec Stadium in Krško, Slovenia.

== Riders ==
First reserve Peter Kildemand replaced Jarosław Hampel, who had injured himself during the 2015 Speedway World Cup. The Speedway Grand Prix Commission also nominated Aleksander Čonda as the wild card, and Denis Štojs and Žiga Kovačič both as Track Reserves.

== Results ==
The Grand Prix was won by Greg Hancock, who beat Tai Woffinden, Peter Kildemand and Nicki Pedersen in the final. Hancock only dropped one point in the entire meeting, finishing to Jason Doyle in heat 18. Overall, Woffinden extended his lead in the world title race to 25 points, with Hancock leapfrogging Pedersen into second place.

=== Heat details ===
Placing	Draw	Rider	Total	1	2	3	4	5	6	7	8	9	10	11	12	13	14	15	16	17	18	19	20	Pts	Pos	21	22	23
Gold	9	(United States) (45) Greg Hancock	20			3		3						3					3		2			14	1	3		3
Silver	10	(United Kingdom) (108) Tai Woffinden	18			2			3						3			2		3				13	2		3	2
Bronze	16	(Denmark) (19) Peter Kildemand	13				2				3	2						3			0			10	4	2		1
4	7	(Denmark) (3) Nicki Pedersen	13		3					2					2	3					1			11	3		2	0
5	12	(Denmark) (88) Niels-Kristian Iversen	11			1					1		3			2						3		10	5		1
6	2	(Australia) (69) Jason Doyle	11	2					1				1				3				3			10	6	1
7	15	(Australia) (23) Chris Holder	9				3			3			2						0	1				9	7	0
8	4	(Australia) (75) Troy Batchelor	9	3							2				0				2				2	9	8		0
9	6	(Poland) (71) Maciej Janowski	9		2				2			3							1			1		9	9
10	13	(Slovenia) (55) Matej Žagar	8				1	2							1		2					2		8	10
11	1	(Sweden) (100) Andreas Jonsson	4	t				1				0				1				2				4	11
12	8	(United Kingdom) (37) Chris Harris	4		1						0			2			1			0				4	12
13	14	(Poland) (507) Krzysztof Kasprzak	3				0		0					0		0							3	3	13
14	5	(Sweden) (30) Thomas H. Jonasson	2		0			0					0					1					1	2	14
15	11	(Denmark) (52) Michael Jepsen Jensen	2			0				1		1					0						0	2	15
16	3	(Slovenia) (16) Aleksander Čonda	1	0						0				1				0				0		1	16
17	17	(Slovenia) (17) Denis Štojs	1																					1	17
Placing	Draw	Rider	Total	1	2	3	4	5	6	7	8	9	10	11	12	13	14	15	16	17	18	19	20	Pts	Pos	21	22	23

e: retired or mechanical failure • m: exclusion for exceeding two minute time allowance • t: exclusion for touching the tapes • x: other exclusion • f: fell
ns: non-starter • nc: non-classify
Semi-finals: Heat 21: Riders placed 1st, 4th, 6th & 7th in the intermediate classification (after 20 heats)
Heat 22: Riders placed 2nd, 3rd, 5th & 8th in the intermediate classification (after 20 heats)
Big Final (heat 23): The first and second placed riders in each of the Semi-Finals

gate A – inside	gate B	gate C	gate D – outside

== The intermediate classification ==
Qualifies for next season's Grand Prix series
Full-time Grand Prix rider
Wild card, track reserve or qualified reserve

Pos.	Rider	Points	POL (Poland)	FIN (Finland)	CZE (Czech Republic)	GBR (United Kingdom)	LVA (Latvia)	SWE (Sweden)	DEN (Denmark)	PL2 (Poland)	SLO (Slovenia)	SCA (Sweden)	POL (Poland)	AUS (Australia)
Gold	(United Kingdom) (108) Tai Woffinden	127	5	17	18	15	8	17	11	18	18			
Silver	(United States) (45) Greg Hancock	102	5	9	13	12	10	9	7	17	20			
Bronze	(Denmark) (3) Nicki Pedersen	98	3	16	15	9	11	17	7	7	13			
4	(Slovenia) (55) Matej Žagar	89	8	7	9	10	6	13	12	16	8			
5	(Denmark) (88) Niels-Kristian Iversen	81	7	6	8	14	8	10	7	10	11			
6	(Australia) (23) Chris Holder	78	0	7	6	18	10	10	10	8	9			
7	(Australia) (69) Jason Doyle	77	4	11	7	7	8	11	12	6	11			
8	(Poland) (71) Maciej Janowski	72	3	2	18	3	12	8	12	5	9			
9	(Denmark) (52) Michael Jepsen Jensen	66	5	10	4	8	7	7	13	10	2			
10	(Denmark) (19) Peter Kildemand	59	–	–	–	12	8	3	14	9	13			
11	(Sweden) (100) Andreas Jonsson	55	3	12	9	2	7	5	7	6	4			
12	(Australia) (75) Troy Batchelor	49	0	7	6	4	11	2	6	4	9			
13	(United Kingdom) (37) Chris Harris	43	7	6	5	5	4	5	2	5	4			
14	(Sweden) (30) Thomas H. Jonasson	40	4	4	1	7	7	7	7	1	2			
15	(Poland) (33) Jarosław Hampel	31	7	11	13	–	–	–	–	–	–	–	–	–
16	(Poland) (507) Krzysztof Kasprzak	29	3	10	4	4	0	0	4	1	3			
17	(Poland) (17,16) Bartosz Zmarzlik	17	3	–	–	–	–	–	–	14	–	–		
17	(Sweden) (16) Antonio Lindback	14	–	–	–	–	–	14	–	–	–			
19	(United Kingdom) (16) Craig Cook	7	–	–	–	7	–	–	–	–	–	–	–	–
20	(Denmark) (16) Mikkel Michelsen	6	–	–	–	–	–	–	6	–	–	–	–	–
21	(Poland) (16) Tomasz Gollob	4	4	–	–	–	–	–	–	–	–	–	–	–
22	(Finland) (16) Timo Lahti	3	–	3	–	–	–	–	–	–	–	–	–	–
22	(Latvia) (16) Kjastas Puodzuks	3	–	–	–	–	3	–	–	–	–	–	–	–
24	(Czech Republic) (16) Vaclav Milik	2	–	–	2	–	–	–	–	–	–	–	–	–
25	(Poland) (18) Piotr Pawlicki Jr.	1	1	–	–	–	–	–	–	–	–	–	–	–
25	(United Kingdom) (18) Robert Lambert	1	–	–	–	1	–	–	–	–	–	–	–	–
25	(Poland) (17) Adrian Cyfer	1	–	–	–	–	–	–	–	1	–	–	–	–
25	(Slovenia) (16) Aleksander Conda	1	–	–	–	–	–	–	–	–	1	–	–	–
25	(Slovenia) (17) Denis Stojs	1	–	–	–	–	–	–	–	–	1	–	–	–
30	(Finland) (17) Nike Lunna	0	–	0	–	–	–	–	–	–	–	–	–	–
30	(Finland) (18) Jiri Nieminen	0	–	0	–	–	–	–	–	–	–	–	–	–
30	(Czech Republic) (17) Matěj Kůs	0	–	–	0	–	–	–	–	–	–	–	–	–
30	(Czech Republic) (18) Josef Franc	0	–	–	0	–	–	–	–	–	–	–	–	–
30	(United Kingdom) (17) Jason Garrity	0	–	–	–	0	–	–	–	–	–	–	–	–
Pos.	Rider	Points	POL (Poland)	FIN (Finland)	CZE (Czech Republic)	GBR (United Kingdom)	LVA (Latvia)	SWE (Sweden)	DEN (Denmark)	PL2 (Poland)	SLO (Slovenia)	SCA (Sweden)	POL (Poland)	AUS (Australia)

== See also ==
- motorcycle speedway
