= 2015 Speedway Grand Prix of Poland II =

2015 Speedway Grand Prix of Poland
- 2015 Gorzów FIM Speedway Grand Prix of Poland

Information
- Date: 30 August 2015
- City: (Poland) Gorzów
- Event: 8 of 12
- Referee: (Denmark) Jesper Steentoft

Stadium details
- Stadium: Edward Jancarz Stadium
- Capacity: 17,000
- Length: 329 m (360 yd)

SGP Results
- Best Time: (in Heat 4)
- (gold) Winner: (Slovenia) Matej Žagar
- (silver) Runner-up: (United States) Greg Hancock
- (bronze) 3rd place: (United Kingdom) Tai Woffinden

The 2015 Gorzów FIM Speedway Grand Prix of Poland was the eighth race of the 2015 Speedway Grand Prix season. It took place on August 30 at the Edward Jancarz Stadium in Gorzów, Poland.

== Riders ==
First reserve Peter Kildemand replaced Jarosław Hampel, who had injured himself during the 2015 Speedway World Cup. The Speedway Grand Prix Commission also nominated 2014 winner Bartosz Zmarzlik as the wild card, and Adrian Cyfer and Rafal Karczmarz both as Track Reserves.

== Results ==
The Grand Prix was won by Matej Žagar, who beat Greg Hancock, Tai Woffinden and wild card Bartosz Zmarzlik in the final. Woffinden had initially top scored with a maximum 15 points during the qualifying rides, however he was beaten by Zmarzlik in the semi-finals and then had to settle for third in the decider. He did eventually score 18 points though, and thus extended his overall lead over Nicki Pedersen to 24 points in the race for the world title.

=== Heat details ===
Placing	Draw	Rider	Total	1	2	3	4	5	6	7	8	9	10	11	12	13	14	15	16	17	18	19	20	Pts	Pos	21	22	23
Gold	7	(Slovenia) (55) Matej Žagar	16		1					2					3	2					3			11	3		2	3
Silver	1	(United States) (45) Greg Hancock	17	3				3				3				0				3				12	2		3	2
Bronze	14	(United Kingdom) (108) Tai Woffinden	18				3		3					3		3							3	15	1	2		1
4	3	(Poland) (16) Bartosz Zmarzlik	14	2						1				2				3				3		11	4	3		0
5	11	(Denmark) (88) Niels-Kristian Iversen	10			0				3		2					3						1	9	5		1
6	5	(Denmark) (52) Michael Jepsen Jensen	10		3			2					2					2					0	9	6	1
7	4	(Denmark) (19) Peter Kildemand	9	1							2				2				2				2	9	7	0
8	13	(Australia) (23) Chris Holder	8				2	1							1		2					2		8	8		0
9	9	(Denmark) (3) Nicki Pedersen	7			3		0						1					3		ns			7	9
10	16	(Australia) (69) Jason Doyle	6				1				3	1						1			x			6	10
11	12	(Sweden) (100) Andreas Jonsson	6			2					1		1			1						1		6	11
12	15	(Poland) (71) Maciej Janowski	5				0			0			3						0	2				5	12
13	6	(United Kingdom) (37) Chris Harris	5		2				2			0							1			0		5	13
14	2	(Australia) (75) Troy Batchelor	4	0					1				0				1				2			4	14
15	8	(Poland) (507) Krzysztof Kasprzak	1		0						0			0			0			1				1	15
16	10	(Sweden) (30) Thomas H. Jonasson	1			1			0						0			0		0				1	16
17	17	(Poland) (17) Adrian Cyfer	1																					1	17
Placing	Draw	Rider	Total	1	2	3	4	5	6	7	8	9	10	11	12	13	14	15	16	17	18	19	20	Pts	Pos	21	22	23

e: retired or mechanical failure • m: exclusion for exceeding two minute time allowance • t: exclusion for touching the tapes • x: other exclusion • f: fell
ns: non-starter • nc: non-classify
Semi-finals: Heat 21: Riders placed 1st, 4th, 6th & 7th in the intermediate classification (after 20 heats)
Heat 22: Riders placed 2nd, 3rd, 5th & 8th in the intermediate classification (after 20 heats)
Big Final (heat 23): The first and second placed riders in each of the Semi-Finals

gate A – inside	gate B	gate C	gate D – outside

== The intermediate classification ==
Qualifies for next season's Grand Prix series
Full-time Grand Prix rider
Wild card, track reserve or qualified reserve

Pos.	Rider	Points	POL (Poland)	FIN (Finland)	CZE (Czech Republic)	GBR (United Kingdom)	LVA (Latvia)	SWE (Sweden)	DEN (Denmark)	PL2 (Poland)	SVN (Slovenia)	SCA (Sweden)	POL (Poland)	AUS (Australia)
Gold	(United Kingdom) (108) Tai Woffinden	109	5	17	18	15	8	17	11	18				
Silver	(Denmark) (3) Nicki Pedersen	85	3	16	15	9	11	17	7	7				
Bronze	(United States) (45) Greg Hancock	82	5	9	13	12	10	9	7	17				
4	(Slovenia) (55) Matej Žagar	81	8	7	9	10	6	13	12	16				
5	(Denmark) (88) Niels-Kristian Iversen	70	7	6	8	14	8	10	7	10				
6	(Australia) (23) Chris Holder	69	0	7	6	18	10	10	10	8				
7	(Australia) (69) Jason Doyle	66	4	11	7	7	8	11	12	6				
8	(Denmark) (52) Michael Jepsen Jensen	64	5	10	4	8	7	7	13	10				
9	(Poland) (71) Maciej Janowski	63	3	2	18	3	12	8	12	5				
10	(Sweden) (100) Andreas Jonsson	51	3	12	9	2	7	5	7	6				
11	(Denmark) (19) Peter Kildemand	46	–	–	–	12	8	3	14	9				
12	(Australia) (75) Troy Batchelor	40	0	7	6	4	11	2	6	4				
13	(United Kingdom) (37) Chris Harris	39	7	6	5	5	4	5	2	5				
14	(Sweden) (30) Thomas H. Jonasson	38	4	4	1	7	7	7	7	1				
15	(Poland) (33) Jarosław Hampel	31	7	11	13	–	–	–	–	–				
16	(Poland) (507) Krzysztof Kasprzak	26	3	10	4	4	0	0	4	1				
17	(Poland) (17,16) Bartosz Zmarzlik	17	3	–	–	–	–	–	–	14				
17	(Sweden) (16) Antonio Lindback	14	–	–	–	–	–	14	–	–				
19	(United Kingdom) (16) Craig Cook	7	–	–	–	7	–	–	–	–				
20	(Denmark) (16) Mikkel Michelsen	6	–	–	–	–	–	–	6	–				
21	(Poland) (16) Tomasz Gollob	4	4	–	–	–	–	–	–	–				
22	(Finland) (16) Timo Lahti	3	–	3	–	–	–	–	–	–				
22	(Latvia) (16) Kjastas Puodzuks	3	–	–	–	–	3	–	–	–				
24	(Czech Republic) (16) Vaclav Milik	2	–	–	2	–	–	–	–	–				
25	(Poland) (18) Piotr Pawlicki Jr.	1	1	–	–	–	–	–	–	–				
25	(United Kingdom) (18) Robert Lambert	1	–	–	–	1	–	–	–	–				
25	(Poland) (17) Adrian Cyfer	1	–	–	–	–	–	–	–	1				
28	(Finland) (17) Nike Lunna	0	–	0	–	–	–	–	–	–				
28	(Finland) (18) Jiri Nieminen	0	–	0	–	–	–	–	–	–				
28	(Czech Republic) (17) Matěj Kůs	0	–	–	0	–	–	–	–	–				
28	(Czech Republic) (18) Josef Franc	0	–	–	0	–	–	–	–	–				
28	(United Kingdom) (17) Jason Garrity	0	–	–	–	0	–	–	–	–				
Pos.	Rider	Points	POL (Poland)	FIN (Finland)	CZE (Czech Republic)	GBR (United Kingdom)	LVA (Latvia)	SWE (Sweden)	DEN (Denmark)	PL2 (Poland)	SVN (Slovenia)	SCA (Sweden)	POL (Poland)	AUS (Australia)

== See also ==
- motorcycle speedway
