= 2015 Speedway Grand Prix of Great Britain =

(United Kingdom) 2015 Speedway Grand Prix of Great Britain
- 2015 British FIM Speedway Grand Prix

Information
- Date: 4 July 2015
- City: (United Kingdom) Cardiff
- Event: 4 of 12
- Referee: (Sweden) Krister Gardell

Stadium details
- Stadium: Millennium Stadium
- Capacity: 62,500
- Length: 278 m (304 yd)

SGP Results
- Best Time: (in Heat 4)
- (gold) Winner: (Denmark) Niels-Kristian Iversen
- (silver) Runner-up: (Australia) Chris Holder
- (bronze) 3rd place: (Denmark) Peter Kildemand

The 2015 Adrian Flux British FIM Speedway Grand Prix was the fourth race of the 2015 Speedway Grand Prix season. It took place on 4 July at the Millennium Stadium in Cardiff, Wales.

== Riders ==
First reserve Peter Kildemand replaced Jarosław Hampel, who had injured himself during the 2015 Speedway World Cup. The Speedway Grand Prix Commission also nominated Craig Cook as the wild card, and Jason Garrity and Robert Lambert both as Track Reserves.

== Results ==
The Grand Prix was won by Niels-Kristian Iversen, who beat Chris Holder, Peter Kildemand and Tai Woffinden in the final. Holder had initially top scored with 13 points during the qualifying rides, however Iversen passed him on the first bend of the final and stayed ahead to claim his first British Speedway Grand Prix victory. Despite finishing fourth, Woffinden extended his lead over Nicki Pedersen to 12 points in the race for the world title.

=== Heat details ===
Placing	Draw	Rider	Total	1	2	3	4	5	6	7	8	9	10	11	12	13	14	15	16	17	18	19	20	Pts	Pos	21	22	23
Gold	6	(Denmark) (88) Niels-Kristian Iversen	14		1				2			3							2			1		9	6	2		3
Silver	9	(Australia) (23) Chris Holder	18			2		2						3					3		3			13	1	3		2
Bronze	14	(Denmark) (19) Peter Kildemand	12				2		3					2		1							1	9	5		2	1
4	13	(United Kingdom) (108) Tai Woffinden	15				0	3							3		3					3		12	2		3	0
5	12	(United States) (45) Greg Hancock	12			1					3		3			2						2		11	3		1
6	7	(Slovenia) (55) Matej Žagar	10		3					2					2	3					0			10	4	0
7	1	(Denmark) (3) Nicki Pedersen	9	3				1				1				0				3				8	7	1
8	5	(Denmark) (52) Michael Jepsen Jensen	8		2			0					2					1					3	8	8		0
9	10	(United Kingdom) (16) Craig Cook	7			3			1						1			0		2				7	9
10	2	(Australia) (69) Jason Doyle	7	2					0				1				2				2			7	10
11	16	(Sweden) (30) Thomas H. Jonasson	7				1				1	2						2			1			7	11
12	4	(United Kingdom) (37) Chris Harris	5	0							2				0				1				2	5	12
13	15	(Australia) (75) Troy Batchelor	4				3			1			0						0					4	13
14	3	(Poland) (507) Krzysztof Kasprzak	4	1						0				0				3				0		4	14
15	11	(Poland) (71) Maciej Janowski	3			0				3		0					0						0	3	15
16	8	(Sweden) (100) Andreas Jonsson	2		0						0			1			1							2	16
17	18	(United Kingdom) (18) Robert Lambert	1																					1	17
18	17	(United Kingdom) (17) Jason Garrity	0																					0	18
Placing	Draw	Rider	Total	1	2	3	4	5	6	7	8	9	10	11	12	13	14	15	16	17	18	19	20	Pts	Pos	21	22	23

e: retired or mechanical failure • m: exclusion for exceeding two minute time allowance • t: exclusion for touching the tapes • x: other exclusion • f: fell
ns: non-starter • nc: non-classify
Semi-finals: Heat 21: Riders placed 1st, 4th, 6th & 7th in the intermediate classification (after 20 heats)
Heat 22: Riders placed 2nd, 3rd, 5th & 8th in the intermediate classification (after 20 heats)
Big Final (heat 23): The first and second placed riders in each of the Semi-Finals

gate A – inside	gate B	gate C	gate D – outside

== The intermediate classification ==
Qualifies for next season's Grand Prix series
Full-time Grand Prix rider
Wild card, track reserve or qualified reserve

Pos.	Rider	Points	POL (Poland)	FIN (Finland)	CZE (Czech Republic)	GBR (United Kingdom)	LVA (Latvia)	SWE (Sweden)	DEN (Denmark)	PL2 (Poland)	SVN (Slovenia)	SCA (Sweden)	POL (Poland)	AUS (Australia)
Gold	(United Kingdom) (108) Tai Woffinden	55	5	17	18	15								
Silver	(Denmark) (3) Nicki Pedersen	43	3	16	15	9								
Bronze	(United States) (45) Greg Hancock	39	5	9	13	12								
4	(Denmark) (88) Niels-Kristian Iversen	35	7	6	8	14								
5	(Slovenia) (55) Matej Žagar	34	8	7	9	10								
6	(Australia) (23) Chris Holder	31	0	7	6	18								
7	(Poland) (33) Jarosław Hampel	31	7	11	13	–								
8	(Australia) (69) Jason Doyle	29	4	11	7	7								
9	(Denmark) (52) Michael Jepsen Jensen	27	5	10	4	8								
10	(Poland) (71) Maciej Janowski	26	3	2	18	3								
11	(Sweden) (100) Andreas Jonsson	26	3	12	9	2								
12	(United Kingdom) (37) Chris Harris	23	7	6	5	5								
13	(Poland) (507) Krzysztof Kasprzak	21	3	10	4	4								
14	(Australia) (75) Troy Batchelor	17	0	7	6	4								
15	(Sweden) (30) Thomas H. Jonasson	16	4	4	1	7								
16	(Denmark) (19) Peter Kildemand	12	–	–	–	12								
17	(United Kingdom) (16) Craig Cook	7	–	–	–	7								
18	(Poland) (16) Tomasz Gollob	4	4	–	–	–								
19	(Poland) (17) Bartosz Zmarzlik	3	3	–	–	–								
20	(Finland) (16) Timo Lahti	3	–	3	–	–								
21	(Czech Republic) (16) Vaclav Milik	2	–	–	2	–								
22	(Poland) (18) Piotr Pawlicki Jr.	1	1	–	–	–								
23	(United Kingdom) (18) Robert Lambert	1	–	–	–	1								
24	(Finland) (17) Nike Lunna	0	–	0	–	–								
25	(Finland) (18) Jiri Nieminen	0	–	0	–	–								
26	(Czech Republic) (17) Matěj Kůs	0	–	–	0	–								
27	(Czech Republic) (18) Josef Franc	0	–	–	0	–								
28	(United Kingdom) (17) Jason Garrity	0	–	–	–	0								
Pos.	Rider	Points	POL (Poland)	FIN (Finland)	CZE (Czech Republic)	GBR (United Kingdom)	LVA (Latvia)	SWE (Sweden)	DEN (Denmark)	PL2 (Poland)	SVN (Slovenia)	SCA (Sweden)	POL (Poland)	AUS (Australia)

== See also ==
- motorcycle speedway
