= 2015 Speedway Grand Prix of Denmark =

- 2015 Kjærgaard Danish FIM Speedway Grand Prix

Information
- Date: 8 August 2015
- City: (Denmark) Horsens
- Event: 7 of 12
- Referee: (United Kingdom) Jim Lawrence

Stadium details
- Stadium: CASA Arena
- Capacity: 12,500

SGP Results
- Best Time: (in Heat 4)
- (gold) Winner: (Denmark) Peter Kildemand
- (silver) Runner-up: (Slovenia) Matej Žagar
- (bronze) 3rd place: (Denmark) Michael Jepsen Jensen

The 2015 Kjærgaard Danish FIM Speedway Grand Prix was the seventh race of the 2015 Speedway Grand Prix season. It took place on August 8 at the CASA Arena in Horsens, Denmark.

== Riders ==
First reserve Peter Kildemand replaced Jarosław Hampel, who had injured himself during the 2015 Speedway World Cup. The Speedway Grand Prix Commission also nominated Mikkel Michelsen as the wild card, and Nikolaj Busk Jakobsen and Anders Thomsen both as Track Reserves.

== Results ==
The Grand Prix was won by Peter Kildemand, who beat Matej Žagar, Michael Jepsen Jensen and Tai Woffinden in the final. Maciej Janowski had initially top scored with 12 points during the qualifying rides, however he was eliminated in the semi-finals. After finishing fourth, Woffinden extended his overall lead over Nicki Pedersen to 13 points in the race for the world title.

=== Heat details ===
Placing	Draw	Rider	Total	1	2	3	4	5	6	7	8	9	10	11	12	13	14	15	16	17	18	19	20	Pts	Pos	21	22	23
Gold	7	(Denmark) (19) Peter Kildemand	14		3					0					0	3					2			8	5		3	3
Silver	16	(Slovenia) (55) Matej Žagar	12				1				3	1						3			0			8	6	2		2
Bronze	8	(Denmark) (52) Michael Jepsen Jensen	13		1						2			3			1			3				10	3		2	1
4	5	(United Kingdom) (108) Tai Woffinden	11		2			2					1					0					3	8	7	3		0
5	9	(Poland) (71) Maciej Janowski	12			1		3						2					3		3			12	1	x
6	12	(Australia) (69) Jason Doyle	12			3					1		3			2						2		11	2		1
7	15	(Australia) (23) Chris Holder	10				3			2			2						1	2				10	4	x
8	2	(Denmark) (3) Nicki Pedersen	7	3					0				0				3				1			7	8		0
9	14	(Sweden) (100) Andreas Jonsson	7				0		3					1		1							2	7	9
10	3	(United States) (45) Greg Hancock	7	1						1				0				2				3		7	10
11	6	(Denmark) (88) Niels-Kristian Iversen	7		0				1			3							2			1		7	11
12	10	(Sweden) (30) Thomas H. Jonasson	7			2			2						1			1		1				7	12
13	11	(Denmark) (16) Mikkel Michelsen	6			0				3		0					2						1	6	13
14	13	(Australia) (75) Troy Batchelor	6				2	1							3		0					0		6	14
15	1	(Poland) (507) Krzysztof Kasprzak	4	2				0				2				0				0				4	15
16	4	(United Kingdom) (37) Chris Harris	2	0							0				2				0				0	2	16
Placing	Draw	Rider	Total	1	2	3	4	5	6	7	8	9	10	11	12	13	14	15	16	17	18	19	20	Pts	Pos	21	22	23

e: retired or mechanical failure • m: exclusion for exceeding two minute time allowance • t: exclusion for touching the tapes • x: other exclusion • f: fell
ns: non-starter • nc: non-classify
Semi-finals: Heat 21: Riders placed 1st, 4th, 6th & 7th in the intermediate classification (after 20 heats)
Heat 22: Riders placed 2nd, 3rd, 5th & 8th in the intermediate classification (after 20 heats)
Big Final (heat 23): The first and second placed riders in each of the Semi-Finals

gate A – inside	gate B	gate C	gate D – outside

== The intermediate classification ==
Qualifies for next season's Grand Prix series
Full-time Grand Prix rider
Wild card, track reserve or qualified reserve

Pos.	Rider	Points	POL (Poland)	FIN (Finland)	CZE (Czech Republic)	GBR (United Kingdom)	LVA (Latvia)	SWE (Sweden)	DEN (Denmark)	PL2 (Poland)	SVN (Slovenia)	SCA (Sweden)	POL (Poland)	AUS (Australia)
Gold	(United Kingdom) (108) Tai Woffinden	91	5	17	18	15	8	17	11					
Silver	(Denmark) (3) Nicki Pedersen	78	3	16	15	9	11	17	7					
Bronze	(United States) (45) Greg Hancock	65	5	9	13	12	10	9	7					
4	(Slovenia) (55) Matej Žagar	65	8	7	9	10	6	13	12					
5	(Australia) (23) Chris Holder	61	0	7	6	18	10	10	10					
6	(Denmark) (88) Niels-Kristian Iversen	60	7	6	8	14	8	10	7					
7	(Australia) (69) Jason Doyle	60	4	11	7	7	8	11	12					
8	(Poland) (71) Maciej Janowski	58	3	2	18	3	12	8	12					
9	(Denmark) (52) Michael Jepsen Jensen	54	5	10	4	8	7	7	13					
10	(Sweden) (100) Andreas Jonsson	45	3	12	9	2	7	5	7					
11	(Sweden) (30) Thomas H. Jonasson	37	4	4	1	7	7	7	7					
12	(Denmark) (19) Peter Kildemand	37	–	–	–	12	8	3	14					
13	(Australia) (75) Troy Batchelor	36	0	7	6	4	11	2	6					
14	(United Kingdom) (37) Chris Harris	34	7	6	5	5	4	5	2					
15	(Poland) (33) Jarosław Hampel	31	7	11	13	–	–	–	–					
16	(Poland) (507) Krzysztof Kasprzak	25	3	10	4	4	0	0	4					
17	(Sweden) (16) Antonio Lindback	14	–	–	–	–	–	14	–					
18	(United Kingdom) (16) Craig Cook	7	–	–	–	7	–	–	–					
19	(Denmark) (16) Mikkel Michelsen	6	–	–	–	–	–	–	6					
20	(Poland) (16) Tomasz Gollob	4	4	–	–	–	–	–	–					
21	(Poland) (17) Bartosz Zmarzlik	3	3	–	–	–	–	–	–					
22	(Finland) (16) Timo Lahti	3	–	3	–	–	–	–	–					
23	(Latvia) (16) Kjastas Puodzuks	3	–	–	–	–	3	–	–					
24	(Czech Republic) (16) Vaclav Milik	2	–	–	2	–	–	–	–					
25	(Poland) (18) Piotr Pawlicki Jr.	1	1	–	–	–	–	–	–					
26	(United Kingdom) (18) Robert Lambert	1	–	–	–	1	–	–	–					
27	(Finland) (17) Nike Lunna	0	–	0	–	–	–	–	–					
28	(Finland) (18) Jiri Nieminen	0	–	0	–	–	–	–	–					
29	(Czech Republic) (17) Matěj Kůs	0	–	–	0	–	–	–	–					
30	(Czech Republic) (18) Josef Franc	0	–	–	0	–	–	–	–					
30	(United Kingdom) (17) Jason Garrity	0	–	–	–	0	–	–	–					
Pos.	Rider	Points	POL (Poland)	FIN (Finland)	CZE (Czech Republic)	GBR (United Kingdom)	LVA (Latvia)	SWE (Sweden)	DEN (Denmark)	PL2 (Poland)	SVN (Slovenia)	SCA (Sweden)	POL (Poland)	AUS (Australia)

== See also ==
- motorcycle speedway
