= 2015 Speedway Grand Prix of Czech Republic =

- 2015 Czech Republic FIM Speedway Grand Prix

Information
- Date: 23 May 2015
- City: (Czech Republic) Prague
- Event: 3 of 12
- Referee: (United Kingdom) Craig Ackroyd

Stadium details
- Stadium: Markéta Stadium
- Capacity: 10,000
- Length: 353 m (386 yd)

SGP Results
- Best Time: (in Heat 4)
- (gold) Winner: (United Kingdom) Tai Woffinden
- (silver) Runner-up: (Poland) Jarosław Hampel
- (bronze) 3rd place: (Poland) Maciej Janowski

The 2015 Czech Republic FIM Speedway Grand Prix was the third race of the 2015 Speedway Grand Prix season. It took place on May 23 at the Markéta Stadium in Prague, Czech Republic.

== Riders ==
The Speedway Grand Prix Commission nominated Václav Milík as the wild card, and Matěj Kůs and Josef Franc both as Track Reserves.

== Results ==
The Grand Prix was won by Tai Woffinden, who beat Jarosław Hampel, Maciej Janowski and Nicki Pedersen in the final. As a result, Woffinden extended his lead over Pedersen to six points in the race for the world title.

=== Heat details ===
Placing	Draw	Rider	Total	1	2	3	4	5	6	7	8	9	10	11	12	13	14	15	16	17	18	19	20	Pts	Pos	21	22	23
Gold	15	(United Kingdom) (108) Tai Woffinden	18				2			3			3						2	2				12	3		3	3
Silver	14	(Poland) (33) Jarosław Hampel	13				1		3					2		0							3	9	5		2	2
Bronze	8	(Poland) (71) Maciej Janowski	18		3						3			3			3			3				15	1	2		1
4	7	(Denmark) (3) Nicki Pedersen	15		2					2					2	3					3			12	4	3		0
5	13	(United States) (45) Greg Hancock	13				3	3							3		2					2		13	2		0
6	5	(Sweden) (100) Andreas Jonsson	9		1			1					2					3					2	9	6	0
7	11	(Slovenia) (55) Matej Žagar	9			3				1		2					1						1	8	7	1
8	6	(Denmark) (88) Niels-Kristian Iversen	8		0				0			1							3			3		7	8		1
9	16	(Australia) (69) Jason Doyle	7				0				2	3						0			2			7	9
10	4	(Australia) (23) Chris Holder	6	3							1				1				1				0	6	10
11	1	(Australia) (75) Troy Batchelor	6	2				2				0				1				1				6	11
12	2	(United Kingdom) (37) Chris Harris	5	1					2				1				0				1			5	12
13	12	(Poland) (507) Krzysztof Kasprzak	4			2					0		0			2						0		4	13
14	3	(Denmark) (52) Michael Jepsen Jensen	4	0						0				1				2				1		4	14
15	10	(Czech Republic) (16) Václav Milík	2			0			1						0			1		0				2	15
16	9	(Sweden) (30) Thomas H. Jonasson	1			1		0						0										1	16
17	17	(Czech Republic) (17) Matěj Kůs	0																					0	17
18	18	(Czech Republic) (18) Josef Franc	0																					0	18
Placing	Draw	Rider	Total	1	2	3	4	5	6	7	8	9	10	11	12	13	14	15	16	17	18	19	20	Pts	Pos	21	22	23

e: retired or mechanical failure • m: exclusion for exceeding two minute time allowance • t: exclusion for touching the tapes • x: other exclusion • f: fell
ns: non-starter • nc: non-classify
Semi-finals: Heat 21: Riders placed 1st, 4th, 6th & 7th in the intermediate classification (after 20 heats)
Heat 22: Riders placed 2nd, 3rd, 5th & 8th in the intermediate classification (after 20 heats)
Big Final (heat 23): The first and second placed riders in each of the Semi-Finals

gate A – inside	gate B	gate C	gate D – outside

== The intermediate classification ==
Qualifies for next season's Grand Prix series
Full-time Grand Prix rider
Wild card, track reserve or qualified reserve

Pos.	Rider	Points	POL (Poland)	FIN (Finland)	CZE (Czech Republic)	GBR (United Kingdom)	LVA (Latvia)	SWE (Sweden)	DEN (Denmark)	PL2 (Poland)	SVN (Slovenia)	SCA (Sweden)	POL (Poland)	AUS (Australia)
Gold	(United Kingdom) (108) Tai Woffinden	40	5	17	18									
Silver	(Denmark) (3) Nicki Pedersen	34	3	16	15									
Bronze	(Poland) (33) Jarosław Hampel	31	7	11	13									
4	(United States) (45) Greg Hancock	27	5	9	13									
5	(Slovenia) (55) Matej Žagar	24	8	7	9									
6	(Sweden) (100) Andreas Jonsson	24	3	12	9									
7	(Poland) (71) Maciej Janowski	23	3	2	18									
8	(Australia) (69) Jason Doyle	22	4	11	7									
9	(Denmark) (88) Niels-Kristian Iversen	21	7	6	8									
10	(Denmark) (52) Michael Jepsen Jensen	19	5	10	4									
11	(United Kingdom) (37) Chris Harris	18	7	6	5									
12	(Poland) (507) Krzysztof Kasprzak	17	3	10	4									
13	(Australia) (23) Chris Holder	13	0	7	6									
14	(Australia) (75) Troy Batchelor	13	0	7	6									
15	(Sweden) (30) Thomas H. Jonasson	9	4	4	1									
16	(Poland) (16) Tomasz Gollob	4	4											
17	(Poland) (17) Bartosz Zmarzlik	3	3											
18	(Finland) (16) Timo Lahti	3		3										
19	(Czech Republic) (16) Václav Milík	2			2									
20	(Poland) (18) Piotr Pawlicki Jr.	1	1											
21	(Finland) (17) Nike Lunna	0		0										
22	(Finland) (18) Jiri Nieminen	0		0										
23	(Czech Republic) (17) Matěj Kůs	0			0									
24	(Czech Republic) (18) Josef Franc	0			0									
Pos.	Rider	Points	POL (Poland)	FIN (Finland)	CZE (Czech Republic)	GBR (United Kingdom)	LVA (Latvia)	SWE (Sweden)	DEN (Denmark)	PL2 (Poland)	SVN (Slovenia)	SCA (Sweden)	POL (Poland)	AUS (Australia)

== See also ==
- motorcycle speedway
