= 2015 Speedway Grand Prix of Sweden =

- 2015 Swedish FIM Speedway Grand Prix

Information
- Date: 25 July 2015
- City: (Sweden) Målilla
- Event: 6 of 12
- Referee: (United Kingdom) Craig Ackroyd

Stadium details
- Stadium: G&B Arena
- Capacity: 15,000
- Length: 305 m (334 yd)

SGP Results
- Best Time: (in Heat 4)
- (gold) Winner: (Denmark) Nicki Pedersen
- (silver) Runner-up: (United Kingdom) Tai Woffinden
- (bronze) 3rd place: (Sweden) Antonio Lindbäck

The 2015 Swedish FIM Speedway Grand Prix was the sixth race of the 2015 Speedway Grand Prix season. It took place on July 25 at the G&B Arena in Målilla, Sweden.

== Riders ==
First reserve Peter Kildemand replaced Jarosław Hampel, who had injured himself during the 2015 Speedway World Cup. The Speedway Grand Prix Commission also nominated Antonio Lindbäck as the wild card, and Linus Sundström and Peter Ljung both as Track Reserves.

== Results ==
The Grand Prix was won by Nicki Pedersen, who beat Tai Woffinden, Antonio Lindbäck and Matej Žagar in the final. Woffinden had initially top scored with 13 points during the qualifying rides, however Pedersen outgated his rivals in the final and stayed ahead to claim the top spot on the podium. Despite finishing second, Woffinden maintained his nine-point lead over Pedersen in the race for the world title.

=== Heat details ===
Placing	Draw	Rider	Total	1	2	3	4	5	6	7	8	9	10	11	12	13	14	15	16	17	18	19	20	Pts	Pos	21	22	23
Gold	16	(Denmark) (3) Nicki Pedersen	17				2				2	2						3			2			11	4	3		3
Silver	4	(United Kingdom) (108) Tai Woffinden	17	1							3				3				3				3	13	1	2		2
Bronze	14	(Sweden) (16) Antonio Lindbäck	14				3		2					0		3							2	10	5		3	1
4	12	(Slovenia) (55) Matej Žagar	13			3					1		2			2						3		11	3		2	0
5	8	(Australia) (69) Jason Doyle	11		3						0			3			2			3				11	2		0
6	1	(Australia) (23) Chris Holder	10	3				3				1				1				2				10	6	0
7	3	(Denmark) (88) Niels-Kristian Iversen	10	2						2				2				1				2		9	7	1
8	15	(United States) (45) Greg Hancock	9				1			3			3						0	1				8	8		1
9	10	(Poland) (71) Maciej Janowski	8			2			3						1			2		0				8	9
10	6	(Denmark) (52) Michael Jepsen Jensen	7		0				1			3							2			1		7	10
11	9	(Sweden) (30) Thomas H. Jonasson	7			1		1						1					1		3			7	11
12	2	(United Kingdom) (37) Chris Harris	5	0					0				1				3				1			5	12
13	7	(Sweden) (100) Andreas Jonsson	5		2					1					2	0					0			5	13
14	13	(Denmark) (19) Peter Kildemand	3				0	2							0		1					0		3	14
15	5	(Australia) (75) Troy Batchelor	2		1			0					0					0					1	2	15
16	11	(Poland) (507) Krzysztof Kasprzak	0			0				0		0					0						0	0	16
Placing	Draw	Rider	Total	1	2	3	4	5	6	7	8	9	10	11	12	13	14	15	16	17	18	19	20	Pts	Pos	21	22	23

e: retired or mechanical failure • m: exclusion for exceeding two minute time allowance • t: exclusion for touching the tapes • x: other exclusion • f: fell
ns: non-starter • nc: non-classify
Semi-finals: Heat 21: Riders placed 1st, 4th, 6th & 7th in the intermediate classification (after 20 heats)
Heat 22: Riders placed 2nd, 3rd, 5th & 8th in the intermediate classification (after 20 heats)
Big Final (heat 23): The first and second placed riders in each of the Semi-Finals

gate A – inside	gate B	gate C	gate D – outside

== The intermediate classification ==
Qualifies for next season's Grand Prix series
Full-time Grand Prix rider
Wild card, track reserve or qualified reserve

Pos.	Rider	Points	POL (Poland)	FIN (Finland)	CZE (Czech Republic)	GBR (United Kingdom)	LVA (Latvia)	SWE (Sweden)	DEN (Denmark)	PL2 (Poland)	SVN (Slovenia)	SCA (Sweden)	POL (Poland)	AUS (Australia)
Gold	(United Kingdom) (108) Tai Woffinden	80	5	17	18	15	8	17						
Silver	(Denmark) (3) Nicki Pedersen	71	3	16	15	9	11	17						
Bronze	(United States) (45) Greg Hancock	58	5	9	13	12	10	9						
4	(Slovenia) (55) Matej Žagar	53	8	7	9	10	6	13						
5	(Denmark) (88) Niels-Kristian Iversen	53	7	6	8	14	8	10						
6	(Australia) (23) Chris Holder	51	0	7	6	18	10	10						
7	(Australia) (69) Jason Doyle	48	4	11	7	7	8	11						
8	(Poland) (71) Maciej Janowski	46	3	2	18	3	12	8						
9	(Denmark) (52) Michael Jepsen Jensen	41	5	10	4	8	7	7						
10	(Sweden) (100) Andreas Jonsson	38	3	12	9	2	7	5						
11	(United Kingdom) (37) Chris Harris	32	7	6	5	5	4	5						
12	(Poland) (33) Jarosław Hampel	31	7	11	13	–	–	–						
13	(Australia) (75) Troy Batchelor	30	0	7	6	4	11	2						
14	(Sweden) (30) Thomas H. Jonasson	30	4	4	1	7	7	7						
15	(Denmark) (19) Peter Kildemand	23	–	–	–	12	8	3						
16	(Poland) (507) Krzysztof Kasprzak	21	3	10	4	4	0	0						
17	(Sweden) (16) Antonio Lindback	14	–	–	–	–	–	14						
18	(United Kingdom) (16) Craig Cook	7	–	–	–	7	–	–						
19	(Poland) (16) Tomasz Gollob	4	4	–	–	–	–	–						
20	(Poland) (17) Bartosz Zmarzlik	3	3	–	–	–	–	–						
21	(Finland) (16) Timo Lahti	3	–	3	–	–	–	–						
22	(Latvia) (16) Kjastas Puodzuks	3	–	–	–	–	3	–						
23	(Czech Republic) (16) Vaclav Milik	2	–	–	2	–	–	–						
24	(Poland) (18) Piotr Pawlicki Jr.	1	1	–	–	–	–	–						
25	(United Kingdom) (18) Robert Lambert	1	–	–	–	1	–	–						
26	(Finland) (17) Nike Lunna	0	–	0	–	–	–	–						
27	(Finland) (18) Jiri Nieminen	0	–	0	–	–	–	–						
28	(Czech Republic) (17) Matěj Kůs	0	–	–	0	–	–	–						
29	(Czech Republic) (18) Josef Franc	0	–	–	0	–	–	–						
30	(United Kingdom) (17) Jason Garrity	0	–	–	–	0	–	–						
Pos.	Rider	Points	POL (Poland)	FIN (Finland)	CZE (Czech Republic)	GBR (United Kingdom)	LVA (Latvia)	SWE (Sweden)	DEN (Denmark)	PL2 (Poland)	SVN (Slovenia)	SCA (Sweden)	POL (Poland)	AUS (Australia)

== See also ==
- motorcycle speedway
