= 2015 Speedway Grand Prix =

Speedway world championship event

Season details
- Dates: 18 April — 24 October 24
- Events: 12
- Riders: 15 permanents 1 wild card(s); 2 track reserves
- Heats: 276 (in 12 events)

Winners
- Champion: GBR Tai Woffinden
- Runner-up: USA Greg Hancock
- 3rd place: DEN Nicki Pedersen

The 2015 Speedway Grand Prix season was the 70th edition of the official World Championship and the 21st season of the Speedway Grand Prix era, deciding the FIM Speedway World Championship. It was the fifteenth series under the promotion of Benfield Sports International, an IMG company. Greg Hancock was the defending champion from 2014.

Tai Woffinden won the world title, with Hancock second and Nicki Pedersen third. It was Woffinden's second title having also won in 2013.

== Qualification ==
For the 2015 season there were 15 permanent riders, joined at each Grand Prix by one wild card and two track reserves.

The top eight riders from the 2014 championship qualified automatically. Those riders were joined by the three riders who qualified via the Grand Prix Challenge. Since the winner of the Grand Prix Challenge, Matej Žagar, had already qualified following his fifth position in the 2014 championship, fourth-placed Maciej Janowski qualified.

The final four riders were nominated by series promoters, Benfield Sports International, following the completion of the 2014 season.

=== Qualified riders ===
#	Riders	2014 place	GP Ch place	Appearance	Previous appearances in series
45	(United States) Greg Hancock	1	—	21st	1995–2014
507	(Poland) Krzysztof Kasprzak	2	—	4th	2004–2007, 2008, 2012, 2013–2014
3	(Denmark) Nicki Pedersen	3		15th	2000, 2001–2014
108	(United Kingdom) Tai Woffinden	4	—	4th	2010, 2011, 2013–2014
55	(Slovenia) Matej Žagar	5	1	5th	2003–2005, 2006–2007, 2008–2009, 2011, 2013–2014
100	(Sweden) Andreas Jonsson	6	—	14th	2001, 2002–2014
23	(Australia) Chris Holder	7	—	6th	2010–2014
33	(Poland) Jarosław Hampel	8		10th	2000–2002, 2004–2007, 2008–2009, 2010–2014
75	(Australia) Troy Batchelor	9	—	2nd	2013, 2014
88	(Denmark) Niels Kristian Iversen	11	—	5th	2004–2005, 2006, 2008, 2009–2010, 2013–2014
69	(Australia) Jason Doyle	—	2	1st	
37	(United Kingdom) Chris Harris	15	3	9th	2003, 2007–2014
71	(Poland) Maciej Janowski	—	4	1st	2008, 2012, 2014
30	(Sweden) Thomas H. Jonasson	21	5	1st	2010–2012, 2014
52	(Denmark) Michael Jepsen Jensen	16		1st	2012–2014

=== Qualified substitutes ===
The following riders were nominated as a substitutes:

#	Riders	2014 place	GP Ch place
19	(Denmark) (19) Peter Kildemand	17	8
20	(Poland) (20) Piotr Pawlicki Jr.		
21	(Sweden) (21) Linus Sundström		11

== Calendar ==
The 2015 season consisted of 12 events, just like 2014, although the first Grand Prix was cut short after 12 heats, and the Latvian Grand Prix was awarded after 20 heats.

Round	Date	City and venue	Winner	Runner-up	3rd placed	4th placed	Results
1	18 April	(Poland) Warsaw, Poland; Stadion Narodowy	(Slovenia) Matej Žagar	(United Kingdom) Chris Harris	(Poland) Jarosław Hampel	(Denmark) Niels-Kristian Iversen	results
2	16 May	(Finland) Tampere, Finland; Tampere Stadium	(Denmark) Nicki Pedersen	(United Kingdom) Tai Woffinden	(Sweden) Andreas Jonsson	(Poland) Jarosław Hampel	results
3	23 May	(Czech Republic) Prague, Czech Republic; Markéta Stadium	(United Kingdom) Tai Woffinden	(Poland) Jarosław Hampel	(Poland) Maciej Janowski	(Denmark) Nicki Pedersen	results
4	4 July	(United Kingdom) Cardiff, Great Britain; Millennium Stadium	(Denmark) Niels-Kristian Iversen	(Australia) Chris Holder	(Denmark) Peter Kildemand	(United Kingdom) Tai Woffinden	results
5	18 July	(Latvia) Daugavpils, Latvia; Latvijas Spīdveja Centrs	(Poland) Maciej Janowski	(Denmark) Nicki Pedersen	(Australia) Troy Batchelor	(Australia) Chris Holder	results
6	25 July	(Sweden) Målilla, Sweden; G&B Stadium	(Denmark) Nicki Pedersen	(United Kingdom) Tai Woffinden	(Sweden) Antonio Lindbäck	(Slovenia) Matej Žagar	results
7	8 August	(Denmark) Horsens, Denmark; CASA Arena	(Denmark) Peter Kildemand	(Slovenia) Matej Žagar	(Denmark) Michael Jepsen Jensen	(United Kingdom) Tai Woffinden	results
8	29 August	Gorzów, Poland; Edward Jancarz Stadium	(Slovenia) Matej Žagar	(United States) Greg Hancock	(United Kingdom) Tai Woffinden	(Poland) Bartosz Zmarzlik	results
9	12 September	(Slovenia) Krško , Slovenia; Matija Gubec Stadium	(United States) Greg Hancock	(United Kingdom) Tai Woffinden	(Denmark) Peter Kildemand	(Denmark) Nicki Pedersen	results
10	26 September	Stockholm, Sweden; Friends Arena	(United Kingdom) Tai Woffinden	(United States) Greg Hancock	(Denmark) Niels-Kristian Iversen	(Poland) Maciej Janowski	results
11	3 October	Toruń, Poland; Rose Motoarena	(Denmark) Nicki Pedersen	(Australia) Jason Doyle	(Poland) Maciej Janowski	(Denmark) Niels-Kristian Iversen	results
12	24 October	(Australia) Melbourne, Australia; Etihad Stadium	(United States) Greg Hancock	(Denmark) Niels-Kristian Iversen	(Poland) Maciej Janowski	(Australia) Jason Doyle	results

== Classification ==
Qualifies for next season's Grand Prix series
Full-time Grand Prix rider
Wild card, track reserve or qualified reserve

Pos.	Rider	Points	POL (Poland)	FIN (Finland)	CZE (Czech Republic)	GBR (United Kingdom)	LAT (Latvia)	SWE (Sweden)	DEN (Denmark)	PL2 (Poland)	SVN (Slovenia)	SCA (Sweden)	PL3 (Poland)	AUS (Australia)
Gold	(United Kingdom) (108) Tai Woffinden (C)	163	5	17	18	15	8	17	11	18	18	16	8	12
Silver	(United States) (45) Greg Hancock	147	5	9	13	12	10	9	7	17	20	16	8	21
Bronze	(Denmark) (3) Nicki Pedersen	131	3	16	15	9	11	17	7	7	13	7	19	7
4	(Denmark) (88) Niels-Kristian Iversen	120	7	6	8	14	8	10	7	10	11	14	10	15
5	(Australia) (69) Jason Doyle	114	4	11	7	7	8	11	12	6	11	8	18	11
6	(Slovenia) (55) Matej Žagar	107	8	7	9	10	6	13	12	16	8	4	7	7
7	(Poland) (71) Maciej Janowski	106	3	2	18	3	12	8	12	5	9	12	11	11
8	(Australia) (23) Chris Holder	95	0	7	6	18	10	10	10	8	9	4	11	2
9	(Denmark) (19) Peter Kildemand	92	–	–	–	12	8	3	14	9	13	9	11	13
10	(Sweden) (100) Andreas Jonsson	88	3	12	9	2	7	5	7	6	4	10	11	12
11	(Denmark) (52) Michael Jepsen Jensen	84	5	10	4	8	7	7	13	10	2	6	5	7
12	(Australia) (75) Troy Batchelor	59	0	7	6	4	11	2	6	4	9	5	3	2
13	(United Kingdom) (37) Chris Harris	55	7	6	5	5	4	5	2	5	4	9	3	0
13	(Sweden) (30) Thomas H. Jonasson	55	4	4	1	7	7	7	7	1	2	6	5	4
15	(Poland) (507) Krzysztof Kasprzak	45	3	10	4	4	0	0	4	1	3	6	1	9
16	(Poland) (33) Jarosław Hampel	31	7	11	13	–	–	–	–	–	–	–	–	–
17	(Sweden) (16) Antonio Lindbäck	20	–	–	–	–	–	14	–	–	–	6	–	–
18	(Poland) (17,16) Bartosz Zmarzlik	17	3	–	–	–	–	–	–	14	–	–	–	–
19	(Poland) (18,17) Piotr Pawlicki Jr.	8	1	–	–	–	–	–	–	–	–	–	7	–
20	(United Kingdom) (16) Craig Cook	7	–	–	–	7	–	–	–	–	–	–	–	–
21	(Denmark) (16) Mikkel Michelsen	6	–	–	–	–	–	–	6	–	–	–	–	–
22	(Australia) (16) Sam Masters	5	–	–	–	–	–	–	–	–	–	–	–	5
23	(Poland) (16) Tomasz Gollob	4	4	–	–	–	–	–	–	–	–	–	–	–
24	(Finland) (16) Timo Lahti	3	–	3	–	–	–	–	–	–	–	–	–	–
24	(Latvia) (16) Kjasts Puodžuks	3	–	–	–	–	3	–	–	–	–	–	–	–
26	(Czech Republic) (16) Vaclav Milik	2	–	–	2	–	–	–	–	–	–	–	–	–
27	(United Kingdom) (18) Robert Lambert	1	–	–	–	1	–	–	–	–	–	–	–	–
27	(Poland) (17) Adrian Cyfer	1	–	–	–	–	–	–	–	1	–	–	–	–
27	(Slovenia) (16) Aleksander Conda	1	–	–	–	–	–	–	–	–	1	–	–	–
27	(Slovenia) (17) Denis Stojs	1	–	–	–	–	–	–	–	–	1	–	–	–
31	(Finland) (17) Nike Lunna	0	–	0	–	–	–	–	–	–	–	–	–	–
31	(Finland) (18) Jiri Nieminen	0	–	0	–	–	–	–	–	–	–	–	–	–
31	(Czech Republic) (17) Matěj Kůs	0	–	–	0	–	–	–	–	–	–	–	–	–
31	(Czech Republic) (18) Josef Franc	0	–	–	0	–	–	–	–	–	–	–	–	–
31	(United Kingdom) (17) Jason Garrity	0	–	–	–	0	–	–	–	–	–	–	–	–
Pos.	Rider	Points	POL (Poland)	FIN (Finland)	CZE (Czech Republic)	GBR (United Kingdom)	LAT (Latvia)	SWE (Sweden)	DEN (Denmark)	PL2 (Poland)	SVN (Slovenia)	SCA (Sweden)	PL3 (Poland)	AUS (Australia)

The first Grand Prix was awarded after 12 heats because the riders deemed the track to be unsafe to race. The win went to Matej Žagar, with second place going to Chris Harris and third to Jarosław Hampel.

The fifth Grand Prix was awarded after 20 heats due to a waterlogged track. The win went to Maciej Jankowski, with second place going to Nicki Pedersen and third to Troy Batchelor.

In the twelfth Grand Prix, Australian Jason Doyle was injured in the final and was unable to partake in the rerun.

== See also ==
- 2015 Individual Speedway Junior World Championship
- 2016 Speedway Grand Prix
