= 2015 Speedway Grand Prix of Scandinavia =

2015 Speedway Grand Prix of Sweden
- 2015 Tegera Stockholm FIM Speedway Grand Prix

Information
- Date: 26 September 2015
- City: (Sweden) Stockholm
- Event: 10 of 12
- Referee: (United Kingdom) Jim Lawrence

Stadium details
- Stadium: Friends Arena
- Capacity: 34,000
- Length: 275 m (301 yd)

SGP Results
- Best Time: (in Heat 4)
- (gold) Winner: (United Kingdom) Tai Woffinden
- (silver) Runner-up: (United States) Greg Hancock
- (bronze) 3rd place: (Denmark) Niels-Kristian Iversen

The 2015 Tegera Stockholm FIM Speedway Grand Prix was the 10th race of the 2015 Speedway Grand Prix season. It took place on September 26 at the Friends Arena in Stockholm, Sweden.

== Riders ==
First reserve Peter Kildemand replaced Jarosław Hampel, who had injured himself during the 2015 Speedway World Cup. The Speedway Grand Prix Commission also nominated Antonio Lindbäck as the wild card, and Fredrik Lindgren and Kim Nilsson both as Track Reserves.

== Results ==
The Grand Prix was won by Tai Woffinden, who beat Greg Hancock, Niels-Kristian Iversen and Maciej Janowski in the final. Hancock had initially top scored during the heats, but was beaten into second place in the final. Both riders finished with 16 points though, meaning Woffinden maintained his 25-point lead in the world title race with just two rounds remaining.

=== Heat details ===
Placing	Draw	Rider	Total	1	2	3	4	5	6	7	8	9	10	11	12	13	14	15	16	17	18	19	20	Pts	Pos	21	22	23
Gold	9	(United Kingdom) (108) Tai Woffinden	16			0		2						3					2		3			10	3		3	3
Silver	3	(United States) (45) Greg Hancock	16	3						3				1				2				3		12	1	2		2
Bronze	10	(Denmark) (88) Niels-Kristian Iversen	14			3			3						2			1		2				11	2		2	1
4	11	(Poland) (71) Maciej Janowski	12			2				2		3					1						1	9	6	3		0
5	5	(Sweden) (100) Andreas Jonsson	10		3			0					3					3					0	9	4	1
6	8	(Denmark) (19) Peter Kildemand	9		2						3			2			2			0				9	5		0
7	1	(United Kingdom) (37) Chris Harris	9	2				1				1				1				3				8	8		1
8	4	(Australia) (69) Jason Doyle	8	0							2				3				0				3	8	7	0
9	16	(Denmark) (3) Nicki Pedersen	7				2				1	2						0			2			7	9
10	6	(Sweden) (30) Thomas H. Jonasson	6		0				1			0							3			2		6	10
11	2	(Denmark) (52) Michael Jepsen Jensen	6	1					0				1				3				1			6	11
12	7	(Sweden) (16) Antonio Lindbäck	6		1					1					1	3					0			6	12
13	12	(Poland) (507) Krzysztof Kasprzak	6			1					0		2			2						1		6	13
14	15	(Australia) (75) Troy Batchelor	5				3			0			0						1	1				5	14
15	13	(Australia) (23) Chris Holder	4				1	3							0		0					0		4	15
16	14	(Slovenia) (55) Matej Žagar	4				0		2					0		0							2	4	16
Placing	Draw	Rider	Total	1	2	3	4	5	6	7	8	9	10	11	12	13	14	15	16	17	18	19	20	Pts	Pos	21	22	23

e: retired or mechanical failure • m: exclusion for exceeding two minute time allowance • t: exclusion for touching the tapes • x: other exclusion • f: fell
ns: non-starter • nc: non-classify
Semi-finals: Heat 21: Riders placed 1st, 4th, 6th & 7th in the intermediate classification (after 20 heats)
Heat 22: Riders placed 2nd, 3rd, 5th & 8th in the intermediate classification (after 20 heats)
Big Final (heat 23): The first and second placed riders in each of the Semi-Finals

gate A – inside	gate B	gate C	gate D – outside

== The intermediate classification ==
Qualifies for next season's Grand Prix series
Full-time Grand Prix rider
Wild card, track reserve or qualified reserve

Pos.	Rider	Points	POL (Poland)	FIN (Finland)	CZE (Czech Republic)	GBR (United Kingdom)	LVA (Latvia)	SWE (Sweden)	DEN (Denmark)	PL2 (Poland)	SLO (Slovenia)	SCA (Sweden)	POL (Poland)	AUS (Australia)
Gold	(United Kingdom) (108) Tai Woffinden	143	5	17	18	15	8	17	11	18	18	16		
Silver	(United States) (45) Greg Hancock	118	5	9	13	12	10	9	7	17	20	16		
Bronze	(Denmark) (3) Nicki Pedersen	105	3	16	15	9	11	17	7	7	13	7		
4	(Denmark) (88) Niels-Kristian Iversen	95	7	6	8	14	8	10	7	10	11	14		
5	(Slovenia) (55) Matej Žagar	93	8	7	9	10	6	13	12	16	8	4		
6	(Australia) (69) Jason Doyle	85	4	11	7	7	8	11	12	6	11	8		
7	(Poland) (71) Maciej Janowski	84	3	2	18	3	12	8	12	5	9	12		
8	(Australia) (23) Chris Holder	82	0	7	6	18	10	10	10	8	9	4		
9	(Denmark) (52) Michael Jepsen Jensen	72	5	10	4	8	7	7	13	10	2	6		
10	(Denmark) (19) Peter Kildemand	68	–	–	–	12	8	3	14	9	13	9		
11	(Sweden) (100) Andreas Jonsson	65	3	12	9	2	7	5	7	6	4	10		
12	(Australia) (75) Troy Batchelor	54	0	7	6	4	11	2	6	4	9	5		
13	(United Kingdom) (37) Chris Harris	52	7	6	5	5	4	5	2	5	4	9		
14	(Sweden) (30) Thomas H. Jonasson	46	4	4	1	7	7	7	7	1	2	6		
15	(Poland) (507) Krzysztof Kasprzak	35	3	10	4	4	0	0	4	1	3	6		
16	(Poland) (33) Jarosław Hampel	31	7	11	13	–	–	–	–	–	–	–	–	–
17	(Sweden) (16) Antonio Lindback	20	–	–	–	–	–	14	–	–	–	6	–	–
18	(Poland) (17,16) Bartosz Zmarzlik	17	3	–	–	–	–	–	–	14	–	–		
19	(United Kingdom) (16) Craig Cook	7	–	–	–	7	–	–	–	–	–	–	–	–
20	(Denmark) (16) Mikkel Michelsen	6	–	–	–	–	–	–	6	–	–	–	–	–
21	(Poland) (16) Tomasz Gollob	4	4	–	–	–	–	–	–	–	–	–	–	–
22	(Finland) (16) Timo Lahti	3	–	3	–	–	–	–	–	–	–	–	–	–
22	(Latvia) (16) Kjastas Puodzuks	3	–	–	–	–	3	–	–	–	–	–	–	–
24	(Czech Republic) (16) Vaclav Milik	2	–	–	2	–	–	–	–	–	–	–	–	–
25	(Poland) (18) Piotr Pawlicki Jr.	1	1	–	–	–	–	–	–	–	–	–	–	–
25	(United Kingdom) (18) Robert Lambert	1	–	–	–	1	–	–	–	–	–	–	–	–
25	(Poland) (17) Adrian Cyfer	1	–	–	–	–	–	–	–	1	–	–	–	–
25	(Slovenia) (16) Aleksander Conda	1	–	–	–	–	–	–	–	–	1	–	–	–
25	(Slovenia) (17) Denis Stojs	1	–	–	–	–	–	–	–	–	1	–	–	–
30	(Finland) (17) Nike Lunna	0	–	0	–	–	–	–	–	–	–	–	–	–
30	(Finland) (18) Jiri Nieminen	0	–	0	–	–	–	–	–	–	–	–	–	–
30	(Czech Republic) (17) Matěj Kůs	0	–	–	0	–	–	–	–	–	–	–	–	–
30	(Czech Republic) (18) Josef Franc	0	–	–	0	–	–	–	–	–	–	–	–	–
30	(United Kingdom) (17) Jason Garrity	0	–	–	–	0	–	–	–	–	–	–	–	–
Pos.	Rider	Points	POL (Poland)	FIN (Finland)	CZE (Czech Republic)	GBR (United Kingdom)	LVA (Latvia)	SWE (Sweden)	DEN (Denmark)	PL2 (Poland)	SLO (Slovenia)	SCA (Sweden)	POL (Poland)	AUS (Australia)

== See also ==
- motorcycle speedway
