= 2015 Speedway Grand Prix of Poland =

- 2015 Lotto FIM Speedway Grand Prix of Poland

Information
- Date: 18 April 2015
- City: (Poland) Warsaw
- Event: 1 of 12
- Referee: (United Kingdom) Jim Lawrence

Stadium details
- Stadium: Stadion Narodowy
- Capacity: 58,145

SGP Results
- Best Time
- (gold) Winner: (Slovenia) Matej Žagar
- (silver) Runner-up: (United Kingdom) Chris Harris
- (bronze) 3rd place: (Poland) Jaroslaw Hampel

The 2015 Lotto FIM Grand Prix of Poland was the opening race of the 2015 Speedway Grand Prix season. It took place on April 18 at Stadion Narodowy in Warsaw, Poland.

== Riders ==
The Speedway Grand Prix Commission nominated Tomasz Gollob as the wild card, and Bartosz Zmarzlik and Piotr Pawlicki Jr. both as Track Reserves.

== Results ==
The Grand Prix was won by Matej Žagar, who beat Chris Harris, Jarosław Hampel and Niels-Kristian Iversen. After safety issues with the track, the meeting was abandoned after 12 heats, with each rider having ridden three times. The result stood, as per FIM rule 077.1.4.1., shown below.

If a Grand Prix meeting is interrupted or suspended for any reason whatsoever,

the following rules will apply:

1. (...)
2. If the meeting is interrupted before heat 20 is accomplished and the remaining heats cannot be completed, then the race points scored at the completion of heat 16 will determine the result.
3. (...)

— Speedway Grand Prix Regulation, Rule 077.1.4.1, FIM (page 7 and 8)

=== Heat details ===
Placing	Draw	Rider	Total	1	2	3	4	5	6	7	8	9	10	11	12	13	14	15	16	17	18	19	20	Pts	Pos	21	22	23
Gold	13	(Slovenia) (55) Matej Žagar	8				3	3							2									8	1
Silver	16	(United Kingdom) (37) Chris Harris	7				1				3	3												7	2
Bronze	12	(Poland) (33) Jarosław Hampel	7			3					1		3											7	3
4	14	(Denmark) (88) Niels-Kristian Iversen	7				2		2					3										7	4
5	3	(Denmark) (52) Michael Jepsen Jensen	5	2						3				0										5	5
6	11	(United States) (45) Greg Hancock	5			2				1		2												5	6
7	5	(United Kingdom) (108) Tai Woffinden	5		2			1					2											5	7
8	10	(Australia) (69) Jason Doyle	4			1			0						3									4	8
9	9	(Sweden) (30) Thomas H. Jonasson	4			0		2						2										4	9
10	8	(Poland) (16) Tomasz Gollob	4		1						2			1										4	10
11	1	(Poland) (507) Krzysztof Kasprzak	3	3				0				0												3	11
12	2	(Denmark) (3) Nicki Pedersen	3	1					1				1											3	12
13	6	(Sweden) (100) Andreas Jonsson	3		3				0			0												3	13
14	7	(Poland) (71) Maciej Janowski	3		0					2					1									3	14
15	17	(Poland) (17) Bartosz Zmarzlik	3																					3	15
16	18	(Poland) (20) Piotr Pawlicki Jr.	1																					1	16
17	15	(Australia) (23) Chris Holder	0				0			0			0											0	17
18	4	(Australia) (75) Troy Batchelor	0	0							0				0									0	18
Placing	Draw	Rider	Total	1	2	3	4	5	6	7	8	9	10	11	12	13	14	15	16	17	18	19	20	Pts	Pos	21	22	23

e: retired or mechanical failure • m: exclusion for exceeding two minute time allowance • t: exclusion for touching the tapes • x: other exclusion • f: fell
ns: non-starter • nc: non-classify
Semi-finals: Heat 21: Riders placed 1st, 4th, 6th & 7th in the intermediate classification (after 20 heats)
Heat 22: Riders placed 2nd, 3rd, 5th & 8th in the intermediate classification (after 20 heats)
Big Final (heat 23): The first and second placed riders in each of the Semi-Finals

gate A – inside	gate B	gate C	gate D – outside

== Intermediate classification ==
Qualifies for next season's Grand Prix series
Full-time Grand Prix rider
Wild card, track reserve or qualified reserve

Pos.	Rider	Points	POL (Poland)	FIN (Finland)	CZE (Czech Republic)	GBR (United Kingdom)	LVA (Latvia)	SWE (Sweden)	DEN (Denmark)	POL (Poland)	SVN (Slovenia)	SCA (Sweden)	POL (Poland)	AUS (Australia)
Gold	(Slovenia) (55) Matej Žagar	8	8											
Silver	(Poland) (33) Jarosław Hampel	7	7											
Bronze	(Denmark) (88) Niels-Kristian Iversen	7	7											
4	(United Kingdom) (37) Chris Harris	7	7											
5	(United States) (45) Greg Hancock	5	5											
6	(United Kingdom) (108) Tai Woffinden	5	5											
7	(Denmark) (52) Michael Jepsen Jensen	5	5											
8	(Australia) (69) Jason Doyle	4	4											
9	(Sweden) (30) Thomas H. Jonasson	4	4											
10	(Poland) (16) Tomasz Gollob	4	4											
11	(Poland) (507) Krzysztof Kasprzak	3	3											
12	(Denmark) (3) Nicki Pedersen	3	3											
13	(Sweden) (100) Andreas Jonsson	3	3											
14	(Poland) (71) Maciej Janowski	3	3											
15	(Poland) (17) Bartosz Zmarzlik	3	3											
16	(Poland) (18) Piotr Pawlicki Jr.	1	1											
17	(Australia) (23) Chris Holder	0	0											
18	(Australia) (75) Troy Batchelor	0	0											
Pos.	Rider	Points	POL (Poland)	FIN (Finland)	CZE (Czech Republic)	GBR (United Kingdom)	LVA (Latvia)	SWE (Sweden)	DEN (Denmark)	POL (Poland)	SVN (Slovenia)	SCA (Sweden)	POL (Poland)	AUS (Australia)

== See also ==
- motorcycle speedway
