= 2015 Speedway Grand Prix of Australia =

- 2015 Don Smallgoods Australian FIM Speedway Grand Prix

Information
- Date: 24 October 2015
- City: (Australia) Melbourne
- Event: 12 of 12
- Referee: (Denmark) Jesper Steentoft

Stadium details
- Stadium: Etihad Stadium
- Capacity: 42,000
- Length: 346 m (378 yd)
- Track: temporary track

SGP Results
- Attendance: 26,609
- Best Time: (United States) Greg Hancock; 60.04 secs (in Heat 21)
- (gold) Winner: (United States) Greg Hancock
- (silver) Runner-up: (Denmark) Niels-Kristian Iversen
- (bronze) 3rd place: (Poland) Niels-Kristian Iversen

The 2015 Don Smallgoods Australian FIM Speedway Grand Prix was the twelfth and final round of the 2015 Speedway Grand Prix season. It took place on 24 October at the Etihad Stadium in Melbourne, Australia.

== Riders ==
Australian rider Sam Masters was given the wildcard for the event. Fellow Aussies Justin Sedgemen and three time reigning Australian Under-21 Champion Max Fricke were named as the reserves.

Masters was involved in a heated clash with triple World Champion Nicki Pedersen at the end of Heat 8. Unhappy that Pedersen had squeezed him close to the wall on the back straight, the two exchanged words at the pit gate. Then as Masters was walking back to his pit he was confronted by Pedersen's mechanic Marek Hu. More words were exchanged and Masters punched Hu before being led away. For his actions Masters was fined by the FIM.

== Results ==
American Greg Hancock, who had won the only previous SGP of Australia in 2002, was unbeaten on the night to take his 20th Speedway Grand Prix win in his record 81st SGP Final. Danish star Niels-Kristian Iversen finished second with Poland's Maciej Janowski in third place. Reigning Australian Champion Jason Doyle qualified for the final but was outed in a crash in the first turn in which he suffered neck and chest injuries. A fully conscious Doyle was then transported to the Royal Melbourne Hospital for observation. Greg Hancock took control of the re-run from the start and was never headed. His win also saw him finish in second place in the World Championship standings.

Going into the second semi-final, Denmark's Peter Kildemand needed 4 points to join Australia's 2012 World Champion Chris Holder on 95 points for the season and force a run-off for the last automatic qualifying spot in the 2016 series. Tai Woffinden won the start of the second semi, but down the back straight Kildemand flew past into the lead and looked set for a place in the final where he would only need to finish second to secure his place or third to force the run-off. Unfortunately however, Woffinden fell on lap two and the race was stopped and re-run with the 2015 World Champion excluded. Kildemand could not repeat his effort in the re-run and finished in third place behind Niels-Kristian Iversen and Maciej Janowski, missing his chance for automatic qualification. However, as there are 15 permanent riders in the SGP, Kildemand as the 9th-place finisher in 2015 received one of the wildcard spots for the season essentially giving him automatic qualification for 2016.

=== Heat details ===
Placing	Draw	Rider	Total	1	2	3	4	5	6	7	8	9	10	11	12	13	14	15	16	17	18	19	20	Pts	Pos	21	22	23
Gold	6	(United States) (45) Greg Hancock	21		3				3			3							3			3		15	1	3		3
Silver	1	(Denmark) (88) Niels-Kristian Iversen	15	3				2				0				2				3				10	5		3	2
Bronze	10	(Poland) (71) Maciej Janowski	11			3			1						1			3		0				8	8		2	1
4	11	(Australia) (69) Jason Doyle	11			1				3		2					0						3	9	6	2		0
5	13	(Denmark) (19) Peter Kildemand	13				3	3							3		1					2		12	2		1
6	7	(United Kingdom) (108) Tai Woffinden	12		2					2					2	3					3			12	3		0
7	2	(Sweden) (100) Andreas Jonsson	12	2					2				3				2				2			11	4	1
8	8	(Poland) (507) Krzysztof Kasprzak	9		1						1			3			3			1				9	7	0
9	4	(Slovenia) (55) Matej Žagar	7	1							3				0				1				2	7	9
10	15	(Denmark) (52) Michael Jepsen Jensen	7				0			1			2						2	2				7	10
11	12	(Denmark) (3) Nicki Pedersen	7			2					2		1			1						1		7	11
12	16	(Australia) (16) Sam Masters	5				2				0	1						2			0			5	12
13	9	(Sweden) (30) Thomas H. Jonasson	4			0		1						2					0		1			4	13
14	14	(Australia) (23) Chris Holder	2				1		0					1		0							0	2	14
15	5	(Australia) (75) Troy Batchelor	2		0			0					0					1					1	2	15
16	3	(United Kingdom) (37) Chris Harris	0	0						0				0				0				0		0	16
17	17	(Australia) (17) Justin Sedgemen	0																					0	17
18	18	(Australia) (18) Max Fricke	0																					0	18
Placing	Draw	Rider	Total	1	2	3	4	5	6	7	8	9	10	11	12	13	14	15	16	17	18	19	20	Pts	Pos	21	22	23

e: retired or mechanical failure • m: exclusion for exceeding two minute time allowance • t: exclusion for touching the tapes • x: other exclusion • f: fell
ns: non-starter • nc: non-classify
Semi-finals: Heat 21: Riders placed 1st, 4th, 6th & 7th in the intermediate classification (after 20 heats)
Heat 22: Riders placed 2nd, 3rd, 5th & 8th in the intermediate classification (after 20 heats)
Big Final (heat 23): The first and second placed riders in each of the Semi-Finals

gate A – inside	gate B	gate C	gate D – outside

== The intermediate classification ==
Qualifies for next season's Grand Prix series
Full-time Grand Prix rider
Wild card, track reserve or qualified reserve

Pos.	Rider	Points	POL (Poland)	FIN (Finland)	CZE (Czech Republic)	GBR (United Kingdom)	LVA (Latvia)	SWE (Sweden)	DEN (Denmark)	PL2 (Poland)	SLO (Slovenia)	SCA (Sweden)	POL (Poland)	AUS (Australia)
Gold	(United Kingdom) (108) Tai Woffinden (C)	163	5	17	18	15	8	17	11	18	18	16	8	12
Silver	(United States) (45) Greg Hancock	147	5	9	13	12	10	9	7	17	20	16	8	21
Bronze	(Denmark) (3) Nicki Pedersen	131	3	16	15	9	11	17	7	7	13	7	19	7
4	(Denmark) (88) Niels-Kristian Iversen	120	7	6	8	14	8	10	7	10	11	14	10	15
5	(Australia) (69) Jason Doyle	114	4	11	7	7	8	11	12	6	11	8	18	11
6	(Slovenia) (55) Matej Žagar	107	8	7	9	10	6	13	12	16	8	4	7	7
7	(Poland) (71) Maciej Janowski	106	3	2	18	3	12	8	12	5	9	12	11	11
8	(Australia) (23) Chris Holder	95	0	7	6	18	10	10	10	8	9	4	11	2
9	(Denmark) (19) Peter Kildemand	92	–	–	–	12	8	3	14	9	13	9	11	13
10	(Sweden) (100) Andreas Jonsson	88	3	12	9	2	7	5	7	6	4	10	11	12
11	(Denmark) (52) Michael Jepsen Jensen	84	5	10	4	8	7	7	13	10	2	6	5	7
12	(Australia) (75) Troy Batchelor	59	0	7	6	4	11	2	6	4	9	5	3	2
13	(United Kingdom) (37) Chris Harris	55	7	6	5	5	4	5	2	5	4	9	3	0
13	(Sweden) (30) Thomas H. Jonasson	55	4	4	1	7	7	7	7	1	2	6	5	4
15	(Poland) (507) Krzysztof Kasprzak	45	3	10	4	4	0	0	4	1	3	6	1	9
16	(Poland) (33) Jarosław Hampel	31	7	11	13	–	–	–	–	–	–	–	–	–
17	(Sweden) (16) Antonio Lindback	20	–	–	–	–	–	14	–	–	–	6	–	–
18	(Poland) (17,16) Bartosz Zmarzlik	17	3	–	–	–	–	–	–	14	–	–	–	–
19	(Poland) (18,17) Piotr Pawlicki Jr.	8	1	–	–	–	–	–	–	–	–	–	7	–
20	(United Kingdom) (16) Craig Cook	7	–	–	–	7	–	–	–	–	–	–	–	–
21	(Denmark) (16) Mikkel Michelsen	6	–	–	–	–	–	–	6	–	–	–	–	–
22	(Australia) (16) Sam Masters	5	–	–	–	–	–	–	–	–	–	–	–	5
23	(Poland) (16) Tomasz Gollob	4	4	–	–	–	–	–	–	–	–	–	–	–
24	(Finland) (16) Timo Lahti	3	–	3	–	–	–	–	–	–	–	–	–	–
24	(Latvia) (16) Kjastas Puodzuks	3	–	–	–	–	3	–	–	–	–	–	–	–
26	(Czech Republic) (16) Vaclav Milik	2	–	–	2	–	–	–	–	–	–	–	–	–
27	(United Kingdom) (18) Robert Lambert	1	–	–	–	1	–	–	–	–	–	–	–	–
27	(Poland) (17) Adrian Cyfer	1	–	–	–	–	–	–	–	1	–	–	–	–
27	(Slovenia) (16) Aleksander Conda	1	–	–	–	–	–	–	–	–	1	–	–	–
27	(Slovenia) (17) Denis Stojs	1	–	–	–	–	–	–	–	–	1	–	–	–
31	(Finland) (17) Nike Lunna	0	–	0	–	–	–	–	–	–	–	–	–	–
31	(Finland) (18) Jiri Nieminen	0	–	0	–	–	–	–	–	–	–	–	–	–
31	(Czech Republic) (17) Matěj Kůs	0	–	–	0	–	–	–	–	–	–	–	–	–
31	(Czech Republic) (18) Josef Franc	0	–	–	0	–	–	–	–	–	–	–	–	–
31	(United Kingdom) (17) Jason Garrity	0	–	–	–	0	–	–	–	–	–	–	–	–
Pos.	Rider	Points	POL (Poland)	FIN (Finland)	CZE (Czech Republic)	GBR (United Kingdom)	LVA (Latvia)	SWE (Sweden)	DEN (Denmark)	PL2 (Poland)	SLO (Slovenia)	SCA (Sweden)	POL (Poland)	AUS (Australia)

== See also ==
- motorcycle speedway
