= 2015 Speedway Grand Prix of Finland =

(Finland) 2015 Speedway Grand Prix of
- 2015 FIM Finnish Speedway Grand Prix

Information
- Date: 16 May 2015
- City: (Finland) Tampere
- Event: 2 of 12
- Referee: Krister Gardell

Stadium details
- Stadium: Ratina Stadium
- Capacity: 16,800
- Length: 400 m (440 yd)

SGP Results
- Best Time: (in Heat 4)
- (gold) Winner: (Denmark) Nicki Pedersen
- (silver) Runner-up: (United Kingdom) Tai Woffinden
- (bronze) 3rd place: (Sweden) Andreas Jonsson

The 2015 FIM Finnish Speedway Grand Prix was the second round of the 2015 Speedway Grand Prix season (the world championship). It took place on May 16 at the Ratina Stadium in Tampere, Finland. It was the second edition of the Speedway Grand Prix of Finland.

== Riders ==
The Speedway Grand Prix Commission nominated Timo Lahti as the wild card, and Nike Lunna and Jiri Nieminen both as Track Reserves.

== Results ==
The Grand Prix was won by Nicki Pedersen, who beat Tai Woffinden, Andreas Jonsson and Jarosław Hampel in the final. Despite finishing second, Woffinden top scored in the meeting and became the new world championship leader.

=== Heat details ===
| Placing | Draw | Rider | Total | 1 | 2 | 3 | 4 | 5 | 6 | 7 | 8 | 9 | 10 | 11 | 12 | 13 | 14 | 15 | 16 | 17 | 18 | 19 | 20 | Pts | Pos | 21 | 22 | 23 |
|---|---|---|---|---|---|---|---|---|---|---|---|---|---|---|---|---|---|---|---|---|---|---|---|---|---|---|---|---|
| Gold | 13 | (Denmark) (3) Nicki Pedersen | 16 | | | | 3 | 3 | | | | | | | 2 | | 1 | | | | | 1 | | 10 | 3 | | 3 | 3 |
| Silver | 2 | (United Kingdom) (108) Tai Woffinden | 17 | 3 | | | | | 0 | | | | 3 | | | | 3 | | | | 3 | | | 12 | 1 | 3 | | 2 |
| Bronze | 1 | (Sweden) (100) Andreas Jonsson | 12 | 1 | | | | 2 | | | | 2 | | | | 1 | | | | 3 | | | | 9 | 7 | 2 | | 1 |
| 4 | 12 | (Poland) (33) Jarosław Hampel | 11 | | | 3 | | | | | 0 | | 0 | | | 3 | | | | | | 3 | | 9 | 5 | | 2 | 0 |
| 5 | 16 | (Australia) (69) Jason Doyle | 11 | | | | 2 | | | | 1 | 3 | | | | | | 2 | | | 2 | | | 10 | 4 | 1 |
| 6 | 7 | (Poland) (507) Krzysztof Kasprzak | 10 | | 3 | | | | | 3 | | | | | 3 | 0 | | | | | 1 | | | 10 | 2 | | 0 |
| 7 | 14 | (Denmark) (52) Michael Jepsen Jensen | 10 | | | | 1 | | 2 | | | | | 2 | | 2 | | | | | | | 2 | 9 | 8 | | 1 |
| 8 | 9 | (United States) (45) Greg Hancock | 9 | | | 2 | | 1 | | | | | | 3 | | | | | 3 | | 0 | | | 9 | 6 | 0 |
| 9 | 5 | (Slovenia) (55) Matej Žagar | 7 | | 0 | | | 0 | | | | | 1 | | | | | 3 | | | | | 3 | 7 | 9 |
| 10 | 6 | (Australia) (75) Troy Batchelor | 7 | | 2 | | | | 3 | | | 0 | | | | | | | 2 | | | 0 | | 7 | 10 |
| 11 | 8 | (Australia) (23) Chris Holder | 7 | | 1 | | | | | | 3 | | | 0 | | | 2 | | | 1 | | | | 7 | 11 |
| 12 | 3 | (United Kingdom) (37) Chris Harris | 6 | 0 | | | | | | 2 | | | | 1 | | | | 1 | | | | 2 | | 6 | 12 |
| 13 | 15 | (Denmark) (88) Niels-Kristian Iversen | 6 | | | | 0 | | | 1 | | | 2 | | | | | | 1 | 2 | | | | 6 | 13 |
| 14 | 4 | (Sweden) (30) Thomas H. Jonasson | 4 | 2 | | | | | | | 2 | | | | 0 | | | | | | | | | 4 | 14 |
| 15 | 11 | (Finland) (16) Timo Lahti | 3 | | | 1 | | | | 0 | | 1 | | | | | 0 | | | | | | 1 | 3 | 15 |
| 16 | 10 | (Poland) (71) Maciej Janowski | 2 | | | 0 | | | 1 | | | | | | 1 | | | 0 | | 0 | | | | 2 | 16 |
| 17 | 17 | (Finland) (17) Nike Lunna | 0 | | | | | | | | | | | | | | | | | | | | | 0 | 17 |
| 18 | 18 | (Finland) (18) Jiri Nieminen | 0 | | | | | | | | | | | | | | | | | | | | | 0 | 18 |
| Placing | Draw | Rider | Total | 1 | 2 | 3 | 4 | 5 | 6 | 7 | 8 | 9 | 10 | 11 | 12 | 13 | 14 | 15 | 16 | 17 | 18 | 19 | 20 | Pts | Pos | 21 | 22 | 23 |

e: retired or mechanical failure • m: exclusion for exceeding two minute time allowance • t: exclusion for touching the tapes • x: other exclusion • f: fell
ns: non-starter • nc: non-classify
Semi-finals: Heat 21: Riders placed 1st, 4th, 6th & 7th in the intermediate classification (after 20 heats)
Heat 22: Riders placed 2nd, 3rd, 5th & 8th in the intermediate classification (after 20 heats)
Big Final (heat 23): The first and second placed riders in each of the Semi-Finals

| gate A – inside | gate B | gate C | gate D – outside |

== The intermediate classification ==
Qualifies for next season's Grand Prix series
Full-time Grand Prix rider
Wild card, track reserve or qualified reserve

| Pos. | Rider | Points | POL (Poland) | FIN (Finland) | CZE (Czech Republic) | GBR (United Kingdom) | LVA (Latvia) | SWE (Sweden) | DEN (Denmark) | POL (Poland) | SVN (Slovenia) | SCA (Sweden) | POL (Poland) | AUS (Australia) |
| Gold | (United Kingdom) (108) Tai Woffinden | 22 | 5 | 17 | | | | | | | | | | |
| Silver | (Denmark) (3) Nicki Pedersen | 19 | 3 | 16 | | | | | | | | | | |
| Bronze | (Poland) (33) Jarosław Hampel | 18 | 7 | 11 | | | | | | | | | | |
| 4 | (Slovenia) (55) Matej Žagar | 15 | 8 | 7 | | | | | | | | | | |
| 5 | (Sweden) (100) Andreas Jonsson | 15 | 3 | 12 | | | | | | | | | | |
| 6 | (Australia) (69) Jason Doyle | 15 | 4 | 11 | | | | | | | | | | |
| 7 | (Denmark) (52) Michael Jepsen Jensen | 15 | 5 | 10 | | | | | | | | | | |
| 8 | (United States) (45) Greg Hancock | 14 | 5 | 9 | | | | | | | | | | |
| 9 | (Poland) (507) Krzysztof Kasprzak | 13 | 3 | 10 | | | | | | | | | | |
| 10 | (Denmark) (88) Niels-Kristian Iversen | 13 | 7 | 6 | | | | | | | | | | |
| 11 | (United Kingdom) (37) Chris Harris | 13 | 7 | 6 | | | | | | | | | | |
| 12 | (Sweden) (30) Thomas H. Jonasson | 8 | 4 | 4 | | | | | | | | | | |
| 13 | (Australia) (23) Chris Holder | 7 | 0 | 7 | | | | | | | | | | |
| 14 | (Australia) (75) Troy Batchelor | 7 | 0 | 7 | | | | | | | | | | |
| 15 | (Poland) (71) Maciej Janowski | 5 | 3 | 2 | | | | | | | | | | |
| 16 | (Poland) (16) Tomasz Gollob | 4 | 4 | | | | | | | | | | | |
| 17 | (Finland) (16) Timo Lahti | 3 | | 3 | | | | | | | | | | |
| 18 | (Poland) (17) Bartosz Zmarzlik | 3 | 3 | | | | | | | | | | | |
| 19 | (Poland) (20) Piotr Pawlicki Jr. | 1 | 1 | | | | | | | | | | | |
| 20 | (Finland) (17) Nike Lunna | 0 | | 0 | | | | | | | | | | |
| 21 | (Finland) (18) Jiri Nieminen | 0 | | 0 | | | | | | | | | | |
| Pos. | Rider | Points | POL (Poland) | FIN (Finland) | CZE (Czech Republic) | GBR (United Kingdom) | LVA (Latvia) | SWE (Sweden) | DEN (Denmark) | POL (Poland) | SVN (Slovenia) | SCA (Sweden) | POL (Poland) | AUS (Australia) |

== See also ==
- motorcycle speedway
