= Greg Hancock =

American speedway rider

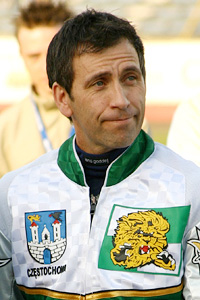
- Born: June 3, 1970 (age 56); Whittier, California, U.S.
- Nickname: Herbie
- Website: official website

Career history

Great Britain
- 1989–1996: Cradley Heathens
- 1997–2001: Coventry Bees
- 2003–2005: Oxford Cheetahs
- 2006–2007: Reading Racers
- 2013: Poole Pirates

Sweden
- 1992-1994: Getingarna
- 1995-2009: Rospiggarna
- 2010-2017: Piraterna
- 2018–2019: Dackarna

Poland
- 1992–1994: Unia Leszno
- 1996–1997: Start Gniezno
- 1998–2004: WTS Sparta Wrocław
- 2005: Wybrzeże Gdańsk
- 2006–2009: Włókniarz Częstochowa
- 2010–2011: Falubaz Zielona Góra
- 2012, 2014: Unia Tarnów
- 2013: Polonia Bydgoszcz
- 2015, 2018: Stal Rzeszów
- 2016–2017: Apator Toruń

Denmark
- 2008: Outrup
- 2011: Esbjerg
- 2012, 2014: Slangerup

Speedway Grand Prix statistics
- SGP number: 45
- Starts: 218
- Podiums: 67 (21-30-16)
- Finalist: 92 times
- Winner: 21 times

Individual honours
- 1997, 2011, 2014, 2016: World Champion
- 1995, 1998, 2000, 2003, 2004, 2005, 2006, 2009: North American Champion
- 1995, 2004, 2011, 2014: British Grand Prix Champion
- 1997, 2011: Czech Grand Prix Champion
- 1997, 2008: Polish Grand Prix Champion
- 2000: Danish Grand Prix Champion
- 2002, 2015: Australian Grand Prix Champion
- 2003: Norwegian Grand Prix Champion
- 2006, 2009, 2013: Latvian Grand Prix Champion
- 2010: Croatian Grand Prix Champion
- 2011: Gorzow Grand Prix Champion
- 2011: Nordic Grand Prix Champion
- 2012: New Zealand Grand Prix Champion
- 2015: Slovenian Grand Prix Champion
- 1997: Elite League Riders Champion
- 1991, 1992: Scottish Open Champion

Team honours
- 1992: World Pairs Champion
- 1992, 1993, 1998: World Team Cup Winner
- 1995, 1997, 2001, 2002, 2011, 2013: Swedish Elitserien Champion
- 2013: Elite League Champion
- 1989: British League KO Cup Winner
- 1997, 2000, 2005: Craven Shield Winner
- 1995: Premier League Fours Winner
- 2000, 2009, 2010: Czech League Champion
- 1995: Danish League Champion
- 1998: Polish Div Two Champion

Gregory Alan Hancock (born June 3, 1970) is an American former professional motorcycle speedway rider. As of 2023, he was one of only six riders to have won the individual World Championship four or more times.

In addition to his four Speedway World Championships, Hancock won the Speedway World Team Cup with the USA speedway team on three occasions and earned 39 caps for the United States national speedway team. Hancock appeared in all but one of the Grand Prix series, since its creation in 1995 until 2019.

== Career ==
Hancock first came to the United Kingdom at the end of the 1988 speedway season to ride exhibition races with fellow 18-year-old Californian Billy Hamill. It was during this time that Hancock agreed a deal to ride for Cradley Heath the following year – the same team that his mentor Bruce Penhall used to ride for. Hancock was an instant success for Cradley in the British League.

Hancock also won gold medals for the US in the 1992 World Pairs and World Team Cup. However, due to injury and problems with the American Motorcyclist Association, Hancock was not able to compete in the Individual World Championship until 1993. That year, he went through to the World Final in Germany where he finished last. In 1994, Hancock again qualified for the last 'one off' World Final. He went into his last race needing a victory to become world champion but he finished third in the race and fourth overall on the night.

Hancock rode for the Swedish team Rospiggarna for 15 years from 1995 to 2009. Former two-time Motocross World Champion, Bill Nilsson, worked with Hancock as his race mechanic and engine builder. He also continued to ride in Great Britain and Poland domestically.

In 1995, Hancock finished in fourth place in the first year of the Grand Prix (GP). He won the final round, the British GP at the Hackney Wick Stadium. The following year, he joined with fellow American and Cradley teammate Billy Hamill to form Team Exide. With this newfound sponsorship, the two young Californians began to dominate world speedway. In 1996 Hamill won the world title and Hancock finished with the bronze medal in third place. In 1997, Hancock moved from Cradley Heath (due to the club's closure) to the Coventry Bees. He won the first GP of the year in Prague and continued the season in the same form. He won the world title (with Hamill finishing second for a Team Exide one-two). Also in 1997, he won the Elite League Riders' Championship, held at Odsal Stadium on 11 October.

In 1998, to Grand Prix format changed to a more cutthroat elimination system. Hancock did not fare so well and finished the year in sixth place but won the World Team Cup with Hamill and Sam Ermolenko. The next year was even worse for Hancock and he finished in 11th place in the Grand Prix. 2000 saw Hancock win his first Grand Prix since his title winning season and he finished in fifth place and in 2001 he finished in 13th place. In 2002, Hancock won the last Grand Prix round in Australia and finished sixth overall. He went one better in 2003, finishing in fifth place after again winning the final round, this time in Haamar, Norway. The following season Hancock was back amongst the medals, finishing the season in third place. That year, he won the British GP at the Millennium Stadium in Cardiff. In 2005, Hancock slipped back to fifth in the world unable to win a GP. A 36-year-old Hancock finished the Grand Prix series in second place in 2006 and remained unbeaten in that year's World Cup but the USA did not qualify for the final as the rest of the team struggled. In 2007 Hancock finished in sixth place. Although he failed to win a GP, he finished in second place on three occasions. In 2008 Hancock finished fourth overall in the Grand Prix series. He was on the podium four times, winning the Polish Grand Prix in Bydgoszcz.

Hancock finished the 2009 Speedway Grand Prix season in fourth position and achieved two podium places as runner up at the Danish Grand Prix and winner of the Latvian Grand Prix. He became the USA Speedway National Champion for the eighth time in 2009 and was subsequently named as the Racing Athlete of the Year by the American Motorcyclist Association (AMA).

Hancock finished in first place in the 2011 Czech, British and Nordic Grand Prix. He secured the 2011 World Championship during the Croatian Grand Prix on 24 September, reclaiming the title after a record 14 years at the age of 41 years and 113 days. Hancock clinched the 2014 World Championship during the Polish Grand Prix on October 11, 2014, and broke his own record of oldest title winner at 44 years and 130 days.

After having competed in every Speedway Grand Prix event since its inception in 1995, Greg Hancock missed his first SGP round in 2014 when he was forced to sit out the Nordic Grand Prix at Vojens with injury after his crash with Niels Kristian Iversen two weeks earlier.

Hancock had a slow start to the 2015 Speedway Grand Prix season in defense of his title, only scoring 14 points in the first two rounds and not gaining a podium finish until his second place in Poland II at the Edward Jancarz Stadium in Gorzów for Round 8. He then won the Slovenian GP in Krško in Round 9, finished second in Round 10 in the Scandinavian GP in Sweden, before finishing off the year in style by scoring an unbeaten 21 point maximum in the Grand Prix of Australia at the Etihad Stadium in Melbourne to secure second place in the championship, 16 points behind England's Tai Woffinden and 14 points clear of third placed Nicki Pedersen.

Hancock regained his speedway world title in 2016 as he consistently piled up the points, including victory in the Swedish Speedway Grand Prix in Malilla in July. He wrapped up the championship after his first ride in the final Grand Prix of the season in Melbourne, Australia.

Despite only competing in six events in 2017, Hancock finished in fourteenth place with 45 points.

After a one-year hiatus due to his wife suffering from breast cancer, Hancock signed for clubs in Poland and Sweden and was given a 'permanent wild card' into the 2020 Grand Prix Series but after talking about his return with Hancock his son Wilbur said it would be difficult for Greg to return to speedway at the level he was racing when he took his break. As a result, Hancock decided to retire in early 2020. In a statement on February 14 he told the world that "As difficult as it is to make a decision like this, it is the right one.".

== Awards ==
In 2020, Hancock was named an FIM Legend. He was also elected into the Motorcycle Hall of Fame on 28 October 2022.

== Personal ==
Hancock lives in Costa Mesa, California. During the European speedway season, he is based in Hallstavik, Sweden with his wife Jennie and three sons Wilbur, Bill, and Karl.

== World final appearances ==
=== Individual World Championship ===
- 1993 - (Germany) Pocking, Rottalstadion - 16th - 2pts
- 1994 - (Denmark) Vojens, Speedway Center - 4th - 11pts

=== World Pairs Championship ===
- 1992 - (Italy) Lonigo, Pista Speedway (with Sam Ermolenko / Ronnie Correy) - Winner - 23+3pts (11+3)
- 1993 - (Denmark) Vojens, Speedway Center (with Sam Ermolenko / Ronnie Correy) - 2nd - 23pts (0)

=== World Team Cup ===
- 1989 - (England) Bradford, Odsal Stadium (with Kelly Moran / Ronnie Correy / Rick Miller / Lance King) - 4th - 8pts (2)
- 1991 - (Denmark) Vojens, Speedway Center - 3rd - 28pts (6)
- 1992 - (Sweden) Kumla, Kumla Speedway - Winner - 39pts (11)
- 1993 - (England) Coventry, Brandon Stadium - Winner - 40pts (9)
- 1994 - (Germany) Brokstedt, Holsteinring Brokstedt - 5th - 17+1pts (5)
- 1995 - (Poland) Bydgoszcz, Polonia Bydgoszcz Stadium - 3rd - 19+3pts (8)
- 1998 - (Denmark) Vojens, Speedway Center - Winner - 28pts (12)
- 1999 - (Czech Republic) Pardubice, Svítkova Stadion - 3rd - 29+3pts (6)
- 2000 - (England) Coventry, Brandon Stadium - 3rd - 35pts (16)

=== World Cup ===
- 2001 - (Poland) Wrocław, Olympic Stadium - 5th - 30pts (9)

== Speedway Grand Prix results ==
Year	Position	Points	Best finish	GP Wins
1995	4th	82	Winner	British GP
1996	3rd	88	3rd	
1997	1st	118	Winner	Czech Rep GP and Polish GP
1998	6th	69	4th	
1999	9th	62	2nd	
2000	5th	76	Winner	Danish GP
2001	13th	43	8th	
2002	6th	122	Winner	Australian GP
2003	5th	121	Winner	Norwegian GP
2004	3rd	137	Winner	British GP
2005	5th	100	2nd	
2006	2nd	144	Winner	Latvian GP
2007	6th	106	2nd	
2008	4th	144	Winner	Polish GP
2009	4th	121	Winner	Latvian GP
2010	5th	107	Winner	Croatian GP
2011	1st	165	Winner	Czech Republic GP, British GP, Nordic GP, Poland II GP
2012	3rd	148	Winner	New Zealand GP
2013	4th	129	Winner	Latvian GP
2014	1st	140	Winner	British GP
2015	2nd	147	Winner	Slovenian GP, Australian GP
2016	1st	139	Winner	Swedish GP
2017	14th	45	2nd	Missed six rounds due to injury
2018	5th	102	3rd	

== See also ==
- United States national speedway team
- List of Speedway Grand Prix riders
