= Nicki Pedersen =

Danish motorcycle speedway rider

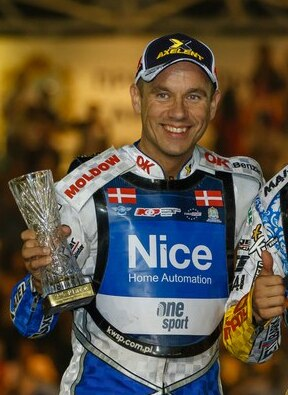
- Born: 2 April 1977 (age 49); Odense, Denmark
- Nationality: Danish
- Website: official website

Career history

Denmark
- 1988–1997, 2025: Fjelsted
- 1998–1999: Holstebro
- 2000–2002: Brovst
- 2003–2023: Holsted Tigers
- 2024: Grindsted

Great Britain
- 1998: Newcastle
- 1999–2000: Wolverhampton
- 2001–2002: King's Lynn
- 2003: Oxford
- 2003–2007: Eastbourne
- 2011, 2023: Peterborough

Poland
- 1999: Gniezno
- 2000, 2020-2023: Grudziądz
- 2001, 2003, 2012: Gdańsk
- 2002, 2019: Zielona Góra
- 2004-2005, 2025: Rybnik
- 2006-2007, 2013, 2024: Rzeszów
- 2008-2009: Częstochowa
- 2010-2011: Gorzów
- 2014-2017: Leszno
- 2018: Tarnów

Sweden
- 1997-1998: Filbyterna
- 1999-2001, 2018-2019: Västervik
- 2002-2005: Smederna
- 2006-2007: Hammarby
- 2008-2010, 2016: Lejonen
- 2011-2013: Vargarna
- 2014-2015, 2025: Dackarna
- 2020: Masarna

Speedway Grand Prix statistics
- Starts: 178
- Podiums: 49 (17-15-17)
- Finalist: 64 times
- Winner: 17 times

Individual honours
- 2003, 2007, 2008: World Champion
- 2002, 2003, 2005, 2006, 2008, 2009, 2011: Danish Champion
- 2005, 2007: Elite League Riders Champion
- 1997, 1998: Danish Under-21 Champion
- 2010: Golden Helmet of Pardubice

Team honours
- 2006, 2008, 2012, 2014: World Cup Winner
- 2015: Polish Ekstraliga Champion
- 2001, 2002, 2003: Polish Div Two Champion
- 1995, 1998, 2000, 2003, 2004, 2006, 2007, 2009, 2014, 2021: Danish League Champion
- 2008, 2009, 2020: Elitserien Champion

Nicki Pedersen (born 2 April 1977) is a former Danish motorcycle speedway rider. He is a three time world champion having won the World Championship in 2003, 2007 and 2008. He has also won the World Cup with Denmark in 2006, 2008, 2012 and 2014.

== Career ==
Pedersen began speedway racing at the age of 11 at Danish club Fjelsted. He stayed at the club until a move to in 1998 to Holstebro, the same year that he made his British league debut with Newcastle Diamonds in the 1998 Premier League speedway season. He topped the League averages which began his journey towards the pinnacle of the sport.

Pedersen started his Polish speedway career in 1999 with Polish Speedway First League club Start Gniezno and would go on to ride for ten different Polish sides. Elite League side Wolverhampton Wolves bought him for the 1999 season. He was at Wolverhampton for two years.

Pedersen took part in his first Grand Prix in 2000, as a wildcard in Denmark and impressed by finishing in fourth place. That year, he qualified for the 2001 Grand Prix where he managed a third in the opening round in Germany and then earned a spot in the Grand Prix in 2002. He showed potential in the opening round in 2002, finishing third in Germany. Consistent scoring left him in 11th place in the World Championship after his first full year.

Pedersen had a bad start to 2002, but secured his GP place in 2003 after recording the first win of his career in the European Grand Prix. He finished the year in 12th place despite an inconsistent season.

In 2003, Pedersen improved massively on his 2002 performance. He finished second in the opening Grand Prix of the season and after a tenth place in the Swedish Grand Prix, Pedersen won again in Cardiff to give him a chance of becoming World Champion. Consistent high placings and four more podium finishes, including three in a row, secured the 2003 World Championship for Pedersen.

Pedersen joined Eastbourne Eagles in 2003 and would stay for four years until the end of the 2007 season due to a change in ownership of the club and a reduction of the points limit for team building purposes by the British Speedway Promoters' Association (BSPA).

The 2004 season was less successful for Pedersen; he failed to record a win or a podium place. He finished in fifth place in the World Championship, well behind the two leaders Tony Rickardsson and Jason Crump. A second place in Slovenia was his best result during the 2005 Grand Prix season and he finished in fourth in the World Championship. Pedersen won the opening GP meeting of the 2006 season in Slovenia, but after that he fell behind championship leaders Rickardsson and Crump. He improved to finish third in the World Championship however, after a podium place in Latvia and a win in Poland. He won his first major team gold for Denmark after winning the 2006 Speedway World Cup.

Pedersen was dominant in 2007, winning four of the eleven Grand Prix, and finishing runner-up in two. He dropped only one point in the opening two rounds and had a run of six consecutive finals, which ended after an exclusion in the semi-final in Great Britain. Pedersen won the penultimate Grand Prix in Slovenia and in doing so became the 2007 World Champion for a second time, after accumulating an unassailable lead at the head of the standings.

Pedersen successfully defended his title during the 2008 Speedway Grand Prix to become a three-time world champion and join a select group of seven other riders at the time. He also helped Denmark win the 2008 Speedway World Cup (his second) and would go on to win four in total after winning again in 2012 and 2014.

Pedersen continued to perform at the major championships riding in every Grand Prix series until his last in the 2018 Speedway Grand Prix. He won the silver medal during the 2012 Speedway Grand Prix and bronze medal at both the 2014 Speedway Grand Prix and 2015 Speedway Grand Prix.

After international retirement, Pedersen continued to ride in domestic speedway in Denmark, Sweden and Poland. In 2022, he suffered a serious crash when riding for Grudziądz in Poland, breaking his hip and pelvis. He missed the remainder of the season. Pedersen returned to British speedway in 2023, when he signed for Peterborough for the SGB Premiership 2023; he had previously ridden in Britain for the club in 2011. However, after crashing and picking up an injury in his first ride he resigned from the club.

In 2023, as the joint Danish team manager Pedersen was part of the Danish team that won the bronze medal in the 2023 Speedway World Cup final. He chose to ride just once in the final itself.

== Family ==
His brother, Ronni Pedersen, has also ridden in the Speedway Grand Prix and World Cup.

== Major results ==
=== World individual Championship ===
- 2001 Speedway Grand Prix - 11th (52 pts)
- 2002 Speedway Grand Prix - 12th (73 pts)
- 2003 Speedway Grand Prix - Winner (152 pts)
- 2004 Speedway Grand Prix - 5th (113 pts)
- 2005 Speedway Grand Prix - 4th (102 pts)
- 2006 Speedway Grand Prix - 3rd (134 pts)
- 2007 Speedway Grand Prix - Winner (196 pts)
- 2008 Speedway Grand Prix - Winner (174 pts)
- 2009 Speedway Grand Prix - 6th (110 pts)
- 2010 Speedway Grand Prix - 10th (91 pts)
- 2011 Speedway Grand Prix - 10th (89 pts)
- 2012 Speedway Grand Prix - 2nd (152 pts)
- 2013 Speedway Grand Prix - 5th (121 pts)
- 2014 Speedway Grand Prix - 3rd (121 pts)
- 2015 Speedway Grand Prix - 3rd (131 pts)
- 2016 Speedway Grand Prix - 13th (62 pts)
- 2017 Speedway Grand Prix - 20th (8 pts)
- 2018 Speedway Grand Prix - 11th (74 pts)

=== World team Championships ===
- 2000 Speedway World Team Cup - semi final
- 2001 Speedway World Cup - 4th
- 2002 Speedway World Cup - 2nd
- 2003 Speedway World Cup - 3rd
- 2004 Speedway World Cup - 3rd
- 2005 Speedway World Cup - 3rd
- 2006 Speedway World Cup - Winner
- 2007 Speedway World Cup - 2nd
- 2008 Speedway World Cup - Winner
- 2009 Speedway World Cup - 6th
- 2011 Speedway World Cup - 4th
- 2012 Speedway World Cup - Winner
- 2013 Speedway World Cup - 2nd
- 2014 Speedway World Cup - Winner
- 2015 Speedway World Cup - 2nd
- 2023 Speedway World Cup - 3rd

=== Grand Prix wins ===
- 1: 2002 Speedway Grand Prix of Europe
- 2: 2003 Speedway Grand Prix of Great Britain
- 3: 2006 Speedway Grand Prix of Slovenia
- 4: 2006 Speedway Grand Prix of Poland
- 5: 2007 Speedway Grand Prix of Italy
- 6: 2007 Speedway Grand Prix of Europe
- 7: 2007 Speedway Grand Prix of Czech Republic
- 8: 2007 Speedway Grand Prix of Slovenia
- 9: 2008 Speedway Grand Prix of Czech Republic
- 10: 2009 Speedway Grand Prix of Poland
- 11: 2011 Speedway Grand Prix of Europe
- 12: 2012 Speedway Grand Prix of Czech Republic
- 13: 2012 Speedway Grand Prix of Croatia
- 14: 2015 Speedway Grand Prix of Finland
- 15: 2015 Speedway Grand Prix of Sweden
- 16: 2015 Speedway Grand Prix of Poland III
- 17: 2018 Speedway Grand Prix of Scandinavia

=== Grand Prix results ===
Year	Position	Points	Best Finish	Notes
2000	20th	17	4th	Fourth placed as a wild card in Danish Grand Prix
2001	11th	52	3rd	Third in German Grand Prix
2002	12th	73	Winner	Won European Grand Prix
2003	1st	152	Winner	Won British Grand Prix
2004	5th	113	4th	
2005	4th	102	2nd	Second in Slovenian Grand Prix
2006	3rd	134	Winner	Won Slovenian and Polish Grand Prix
2007	1st	196	Winner	Won in Italian, European, Czech Republic and Slovenian Grand Prix
2008	1st	174	Winner	Won in Czech Republic Grand Prix
2009	6th	110	Winner	Won in Polish Grand Prix
2010	10th	91	4th	
2011	10th	89	Winner	Won European Grand Prix
2012	2nd	152	Winner	Won Czech Republic and Croatian Grand Prix
2013	5th	121	3rd	Third in New Zealand, Swedish and Czech Republic Grand Prix
2014	3rd	134	2nd	Second in New Zealand and Latvian Grand Prix
2015	3rd	131	Winner	Won Finnish, Swedish and Third Polish Grand Prix
2016	13th	62	4th	
2017	20th	8	13th	
2018	11th	74	Winner	Won Scandinavia GP

2007 Speedway Grand Prix Final Championship standings (Riding No 3)
Race no.	Grand Prix	Pos.	Pts.	Heats	Draw No
1 /11	(Italy) Italian SGP	1	24	(3,3,3,3,3) +3 +6	13
2 /11	(Europe) European SGP	1	23	(3,2,3,3,3) +3 +6	3
3 /11	(Sweden) Swedish SGP	4	11	(0,3,3,X,3) +2 +0	9
4 /11	(Denmark) Danish SGP	2	16	(T,3,3,1,2) +3 +4	6
5 /11	(United Kingdom) British SGP	6	12	(2,3,2,3,2) +X	9
6 /11	(Czech Republic) Czech Rep. SGP	1	24	(3,3,3,3,3) +3 +6	7
7 /11	(Sweden) Scandinavian SGP	5	16	(3,3,3,3,3) +1	12
8 /11	(Latvia) Latvian SGP	2	19	(3,3,1,3,2) +3 +4	11
9 /11	(Poland) Polish SGP	3	19	(2,3,3,3,3) +3 +2	16
10 /11	(Slovenia) Slovenian SGP	1	23	(3,2,3,3,3) +3 +6	14
11 /11	(Germany) German SGP	8	9	(1,1,1,3,3) +E	7

2008 Speedway Grand Prix Final Championship standings (Riding No 1)
Race no.	Grand Prix	Pos.	Pts.	Heats	Draw No
1 /11	(Slovenia) Slovenian SGP	2	17	(3,2,3,1,1) +3 +4	11
2 /11	(Europe) European SGP	3	16	(3,2,1,3,3) +2 +2	3
3 /11	(Sweden) Swedish SGP	3	16	(2,1,3,3,2) +3 +2	7
4 /11	(Denmark) Danish SGP	2	20	(3,3,3,2,3) +2 +4	13
5 /11	(United Kingdom) British SGP	3	11	(2,1,2,0,3) +3 +f	10
6 /11	(Czech Republic) Czech Rep. SGP	1	22	(3,2,3,3,3) +2 +6	10
7 /11	(Sweden) Scandinavian SGP	3	14	(2,2,0,3,3) +2 +2	14
8 /11	(Latvia) Latvian SGP	2	18	(2,3,3,3,0) +2 +4	1
9 /11	(Poland) Polish SGP	2	21	(3,3,2,3,3) +2 +4	10
10 /11	(Italy) Italian SGP	11	6	(1,x,3,0,2)	8
11 /11	(Germany) German SGP	5	13	(3,3,1,2,3) +1	7

permanent speedway rider
wild card, track reserve or qualified reserve
rider not classified (track reserve who did not start)
