= Jason Garrity =

English motorcycle speedway rider (born 1993)

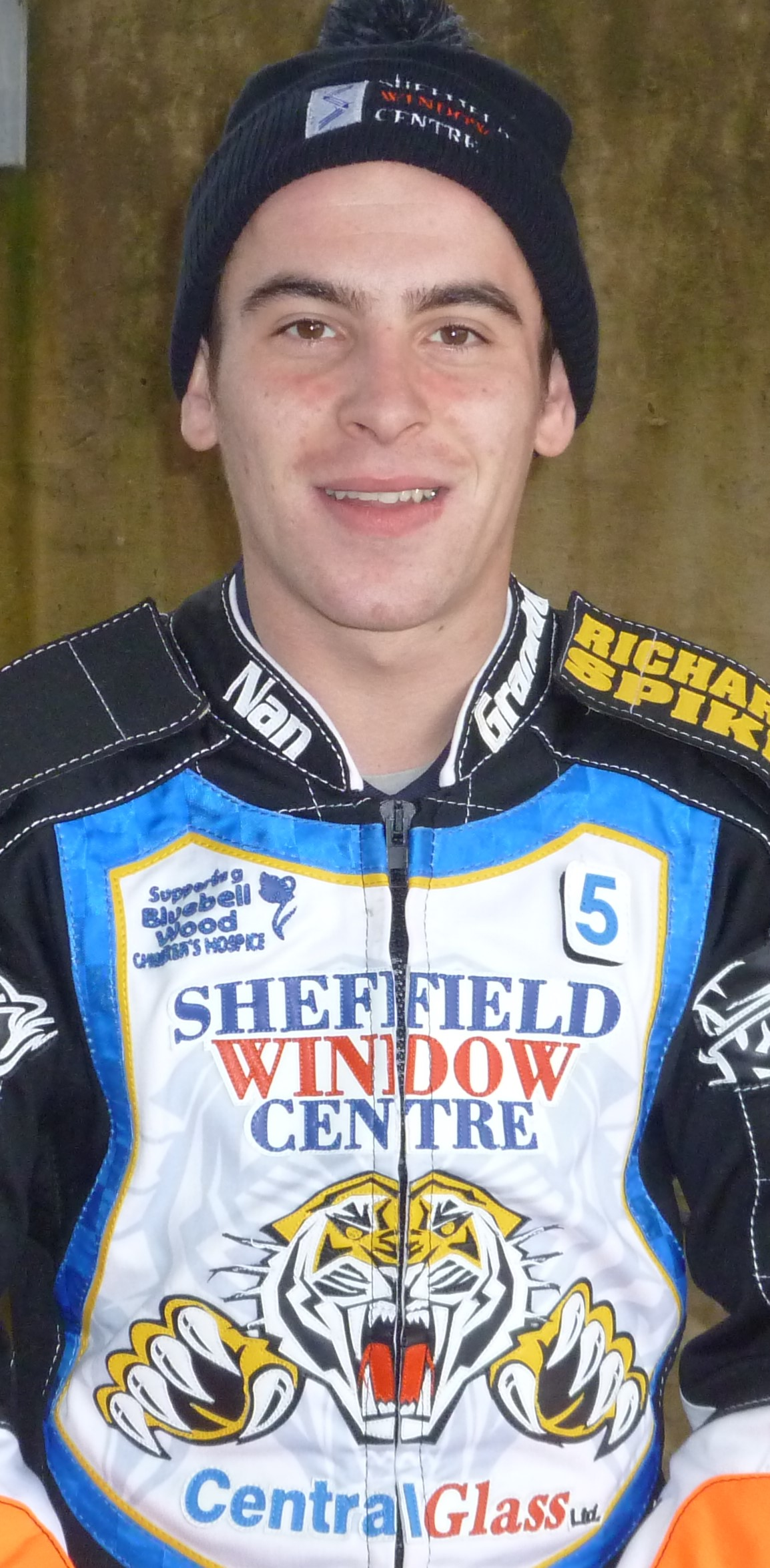
- Born: 9 November 1993 (age 33); Longsight, Greater Manchester, England
- Nationality: British (English)

Career history
- 2009–2010: Buxton Hitmen
- 2011: Belle Vue Colts
- 2011, 2017: Leicester Lions
- 2012–2014: Rye House Rockets
- 2014–2016: Coventry Bees
- 2015–2016: Sheffield Tigers
- 2017: Redcar Bears
- 2018: Belle Vue Aces
- 2018: King's Lynn Stars
- 2018–2019: Scunthorpe Scorpions
- 2019–2020: Birmingham Brummies
- 2019: Peterborough Panthers

Individual honours
- 2008: British Under-15 Champion
- 2011: British Under-19 Champion
- 2011.: National League Riders' Champion

Team honours
- 2010: National League Trophy
- 2010: National League Knock-out Cup
- 2010: National League Champions

Jason David Garrity (born 9 November 1993) was an English motorcycle speedway rider who won the British Under-19 Championship and the National League Riders Championship in 2011.

== Biography ==
Born in Longsight but now living in Droylsden, Greater Manchester, Garrity was raised by his grandfather, former world kickboxing champion Kenny Longshaw. After taking up speedway in 1999, he progressed to a 500cc bike at the age of ten and won the British Under-15 championship in 2008. He began riding for Buxton Hitmen in 2009, becoming a regular part of the team the following year. In December 2010, he was signed by Belle Vue Aces who made him part of their National League Colts side in 2011.

In July 2011, Garrity won the British Under-19 Championship at Rye House, and later that month made his Elite League debut for the Aces in two matches against the Peterborough Panthers. The following month, he joined Premier League team the Leicester Lions on loan for the remainder of the season. He added another title in September when he won the National League Riders' Championship, also at Rye House.

In November 2011, Garrity signed to ride for Rye House Rockets in 2012. He was a Grand Prix reserve in 2014. Garrity signed the Coventry Bees on a full transfer from Rye House Rockets in 2015. In 2017 he signed for Redcar Bears in the British SGB Championship. After a fourth placed finish in the British Riders Championship in June 2018, he signed a temporary 28-day contract with the Belle Vue Aces.

In 2020, Garrity was charged for burglary, robbery and two accounts of attempting to commit fraud. According to news reports, "He appeared before Stockport Magistrates’ Court today (Monday 20 April 2020) where he was remanded to appear before Manchester Minshull Street Crown Court on 18 May 2020." He was sentenced to seven years and six months in prison.
