= Michael Jepsen Jensen =

Danish speedway rider (born 1992)

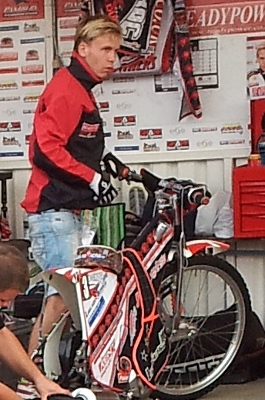
- Jensen in 2012
- Born: 18 February 1992 (age 34); Grindsted, Denmark
- Nickname: Liglad
- Nationality: Danish
- Website: Official website

Career history

Denmark
- 2009–2011: Vojens
- 2012–2015: Grindsted
- 2019: Region Varde
- 2016–2018, 2021–2026: Slangerup

Poland
- 2010–2011, 2017: Toruń
- 2012, 2016: Gorzów
- 2013-2014: Częstochowa
- 2015: Wrocław
- 2018-2020: Zielona Góra
- 2021: Rybnik
- 2022: Gniezno
- 2023: Gdańsk
- 2024–2026: Grudziądz

Great Britain
- 2011-2012: Peterborough
- 2014: Coventry
- 2025: Birmingham

Sweden
- 2010-2011: Vargarna
- 2012–2016: Dackarna
- 2017–2025: Smederna

Speedway Grand Prix statistics
- SGP number: 101
- Starts: 38
- Finalist: 8 times
- Winner: 1 times

Individual honours
- 2012: Under-21 World Champion
- 2012: Nordic Grand Prix Champion
- 2025: Danish Champion

Team honours
- 2010, 2013: Team U-21 World Champion
- 2012: Team World Champion
- 2016: Polish league champion
- 2017, 2018, 2019, 2022: Swedish league champion
- 2024, 2025: Danish league champion
- 2012: World team champion

Michael Jepsen Jensen (born 18 February 1992) is a Danish motorcycle speedway rider.

== Career ==
Jepsen Jensen was part of the 2010 Under-21 World Cup winning Denmark team.

Jepsen Jensen peaked in 2012, winning the 2012 Speedway World Cup with the Denmark national speedway team and winning the 2012 Speedway Grand Prix of Nordic becoming the first wildcard to have won a GP meeting since Hans Andersen. In the Nordic Grand Prix he defeated Nicki Pedersen, Emil Sayfutdinov and Jason Crump in the final. Later that year in November 2012, he won the Individual Under-21 World Championship.

In 2013, Jepsen Jensen won a second gold medal at 2013 Team Speedway Junior World Championship as part of the U21 Danish team. He then secured a permanent place in the 2015 Speedway Grand Prix, finishing 11th with 84 points.

In 2022, Jepsen Jensen helped Smederna win the Swedish Speedway Team Championship during the 2022 campaign, and continued to ride for them in 2023 and 2024. Jepsen Jensen helped Slangerup win the Danish Speedway League during the 2024 Danish speedway season.

During the 2025 Danish speedway season, Jepsen Jensen helped Slangerup retain the Speedway Ligaen title.

== Major results ==
=== World individual Championship ===
- 2012 Speedway Grand Prix – 17th (22 pts)
- 2013 Speedway Grand Prix – 25th (6 pts)
- 2014 Speedway Grand Prix – 16th (42 pts)
- 2015 Speedway Grand Prix – 11th (84 pts)
- 2016 Speedway Grand Prix – 16th (31 pts)
- 2017 Speedway Grand Prix – 20th (8 pts)
- 2018 Speedway Grand Prix – 21st (4 pts)
- 2025 Speedway Grand Prix – 16th (16 pts)
- 2026 Speedway Grand Prix – 4th (111 pts)

=== Grand Prix wins ===
- 1: 2012 Speedway Grand Prix of Nordic

=== World team Championships ===
- 2012 Speedway World Cup – Champion
- 2013 Speedway World Cup – 2nd
- 2025 Speedway of Nations – 3rd
- 2026 Speedway World Cup – 2nd

=== World U21 Championships ===
- 2011 Speedway Under-21 World Championship - 6th (37 pts)
- 2012 Speedway Under-21 World Championship - Winner (90 pts)
- 2010 Team Speedway Junior World Championship – Winners (51 pts)
- 2011 Team Speedway Junior World Championship – 2nd (31 pts)
- 2012 Team Speedway Junior World Championship – 5th (45 pts)
- 2013 Team Speedway Junior World Championship – Winners (42 pts)

=== European Championships ===
- Individual U-19 European Championship
  - 2010 – (Croatia) Goričan – 6th placed (10 pts)
- Team U-19 European Championship
  - 2009 – (Denmark) Holsted – 3rd placed (10 pts)
  - 2010 – lost in the Semi-Final One

== See also ==
- Denmark national under-21 speedway team (U-19)
