= Thomas H. Jonasson =

Swedish motorcycle speedway racer

Thomas Jonasson
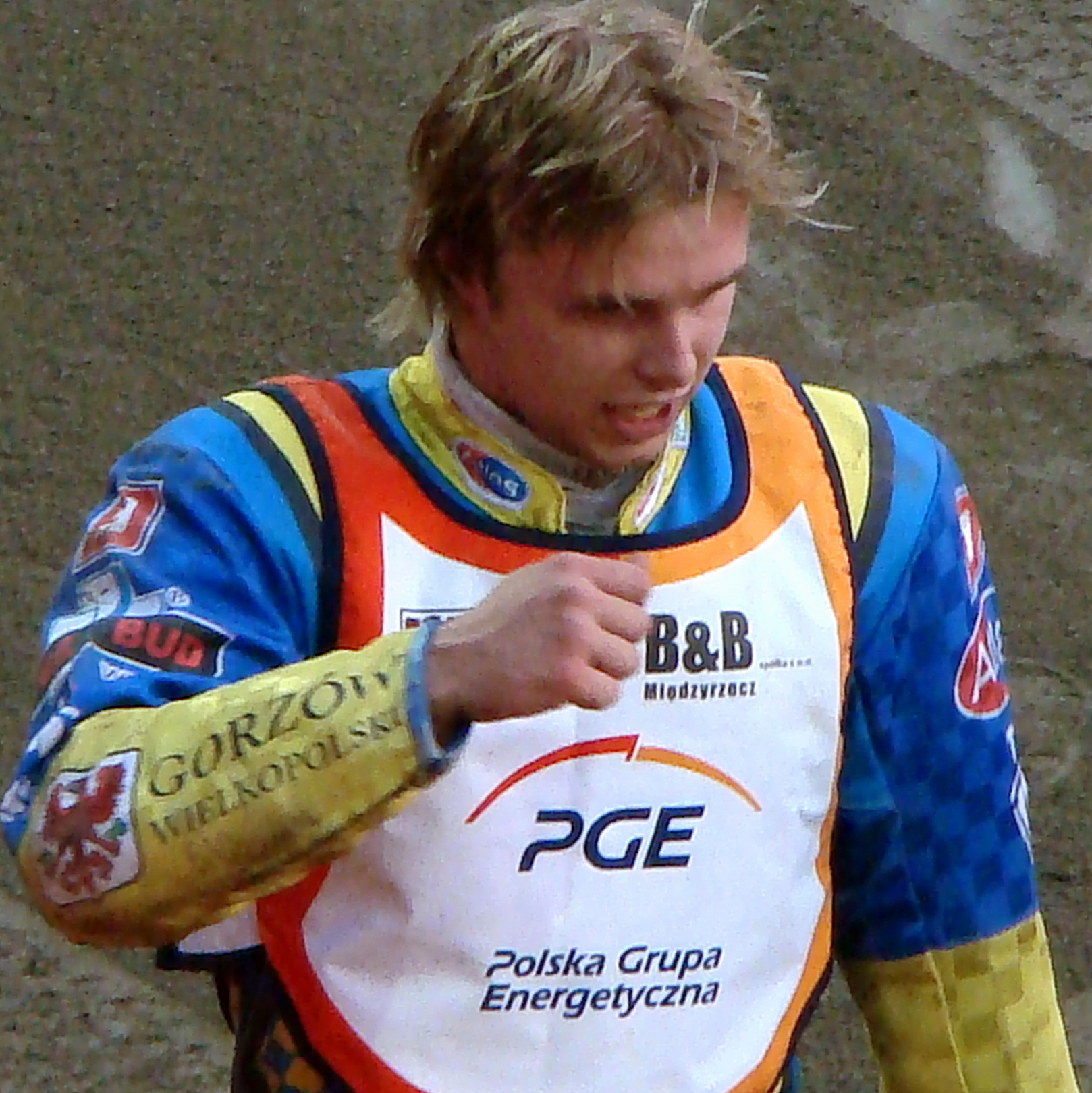
- Jonasson in Gorzów
- Born: 27 November 1988 (age 37); Vetlanda, Sweden
- Nationality: Swedish

Career history

Swedish Elitserien
- 2005–2018, 2025: Vetlanda/Njudungarna
- 2019–2020: Rospiggarna
- 2021–2022: Piraterna
- 2024–2025: Dackarna

Great Britain
- 2008–2009: Edinburgh Monarchs
- 2010: Swindon Robins
- 2011, 2013, 2019: Poole Pirates
- 2012: Peterborough Panthers
- 2017: King's Lynn Stars
- 2019: Berwick Bandits

Poland
- 2006–2009: Gorzów
- 2010–2014: Gdańsk
- 2015: Leszno
- 2016: Częstochowa
- 2017, 2021: Daugavpils
- 2018–2019, 2022: Piła

Denmark
- 2014: Munkebo

Individual honours
- 2014: Swedish Champion
- 2009: Swedish U21 champion

Team honours
- 2008: Premier League
- 2011, 2013: Elite League winner
- 2011, 2013: Premier Trophy
- 2014, 2015: Elitserien League Champion

Thomas Hjelm Jonasson (born 27 November 1988) is a Swedish international motorcycle speedway rider. He earned 3 caps for the Sweden national speedway team.

== Career ==
Jonasson's introduction to British speedway in 2008 went well after he won the Premier League and the Premier Trophy with the Edinburgh Monarchs. In 2009, Jonasson continued to race for Elit Vetlanda Speedway in Sweden, Gorzów in Poland and Edinburgh.

In 2010, Jonasson rode for Swindon Robins, with short stints at Poole Pirates in 2011 and Peterborough Panthers in 2012. In May 2013, he re-signed for Poole Pirates;

In 2014, Jonasson became the champion of Sweden, winning the Swedish Individual Speedway Championship. In 2017, he signed for King's Lynn Stars.

Jonasson returned to British speedway again for the 2019 season but only raced a handful of times of Berwick Bandits in the SGB Championship 2019 and Poole in the SGB Premiership 2019. In 2024, he joined Dackarna in the Elitserien.

== Honours ==
- Individual U-21 World Championship:
  - 2007 - 6th place (10 points)
  - 2008 - 8th place in Qualifying Round 4 (8 points)
  - 2009 - (Croatia) Goričan - 11th place (6 pts)
- Team U-21 World Championship:
  - 2006 - Silver medal (8 points)
  - 2007 - 3rd place in Qualifying Round 1 (3 points)
  - 2009 - (Poland) Gorzów Wlkp. - 3rd place (11 pts)
- Individual U-19 European Championship:
  - 2007 - 5th place (10+1 points)
- Individual Swedish Championship:
  - 2006 - 10th place
  - 2007 - 17th place
  - 2008 - Bronze medal
  - 2009 - Bronze medal
  - 2010 - 4th place
  - 2011 - 5th place
  - 2012 - Bronze medal
  - 2013 - 5th place
  - 2014 - Gold medal
  - 2015 - 12th place
- Individual Junior Swedish Championship:
  - 2005 - 12th place
  - 2006 - Bronze medal
  - 2007 - 11th place
  - 2009 - Gold medal

Starts in Grand Prix:

  - GP Scandinavia - 2010 (IX) - 8 points (1,2,2,d,3)
  - GP Challenge Vojens - 2010 (VI) - 9 points (2,2,1,1,3)
  - GP Scandinavia (Målilla) - 2011 (VII) - 9 points (W,1,3,3,2,0) - came to semifinal

== See also ==
- Sweden national speedway team
