= 2012 Speedway Grand Prix of Italy =

- 2012 FIM Fogo Italian SGP

Information
- Date: 11 August 2012
- City: (Italy) Terenzano
- Event: 8 of 12 (152)
- Referee: (United Kingdom) Craig Ackroyd
- Jury President: (Germany) Wolfgang Glas

Stadium details
- Stadium: Pista Olimpia Terenzano
- Capacity: 4,000
- Length: 400 m (440 yd)
- Track: speedway

SGP Results
- Attendance: 3,000
- Best Time: (Sweden) Antonio Lindbäck; 71,37 secs (in Heat 1)
- (gold) Winner: (Sweden) Antonio Lindbäck
- (silver) Runner-up: (Russia) Emil Sayfutdinov
- (bronze) 3rd place: (United States) Greg Hancock

The 2012 FIM Fogo Italian Speedway Grand Prix was the eighth race meeting of the 2012 Speedway Grand Prix season. It took place on August 11, at the Pista Olimpia Terenzano stadium in Terenzano, Italy.

The Grand Prix was won by Antonio Lindbäck who beat Emil Sayfutdinov, Greg Hancock and Martin Vaculík. It was first SGP win for Lindbäck in his 52nd start. He and Fredrik Lindgren are the most "waiting for win" riders.

== Riders ==
The Speedway Grand Prix Commission nominated Nicolas Covatti as Wild Card, and Michele Paco Castagna and Nicolas Vicentin both as Track Reserves. Injured Jarosław Hampel was replaced by first Qualified Substitutes, Martin Vaculík for third time. The draw was made on August 10.

(3) (Poland) Jarosław Hampel → (19) (Slovakia) Martin Vaculík

== Results ==
=== Heat details ===
Placing	Draw	Rider	Total	1	2	3	4	5	6	7	8	9	10	11	12	13	14	15	16	17	18	19	20	Pts	Pos	21	22	23
1	3	(Sweden) (12) Antonio Lindbäck	16	3						1				0				3				1		8	7	2		3
2	6	(Russia) (6) Emil Sayfutdinov	19		3				3			2							2			2		12	1	3		2
3	8	(United States) (1) Greg Hancock	14		2						2			3			0			3				10	3		2	1
4	12	(Slovakia) (19) Martin Vaculík	14			0					3		2			3						3		11	2		3	X
5	5	(Australia) (4) Jason Crump	10		0			2					3					2					3	10	4	0
6	11	(Australia) (8) Chris Holder	10			3				0		3					1						2	9	5		1
7	7	(Denmark) (10) Nicki Pedersen	10		1					3					1	1					3			9	6	1
8	1	(Sweden) (2) Andreas Jonsson	8	2				3				1				0				2				8	8		F
9	10	(Sweden) (14) Peter Ljung	8			2			2						3			1		0				8	9
10	13	(United Kingdom) (11) Chris Harris	8				2	1							2		3					X		8	10
11	15	(Denmark) (7) Kenneth Bjerre	6				3			2			R						0	1				6	11
12	14	(Poland) (5) Tomasz Gollob	6				1		R					2		2							1	6	12
13	2	(Sweden) (9) Fredrik Lindgren	5	0					1				1				2				1			5	13
14	4	(Denmark) (15) Hans N. Andersen	4	1							0				0				3				0	4	14
15	16	(Italy) (16) Nicolas Covatti	3				0				1	0						0			2			3	15
16	9	(Denmark) (13) Bjarne Pedersen	3			1		0						1					1		0			3	16
17	17	(Italy) (17) Michele Paco Castagna	-																					-	17
18	18	(Italy) (18) Nicolas Vicentin	-																					-	18
Placing	Draw	Rider	Total	1	2	3	4	5	6	7	8	9	10	11	12	13	14	15	16	17	18	19	20	Pts	Pos	21	22	23

e: retired or mechanical failure • m: exclusion for exceeding two minute time allowance • t: exclusion for touching the tapes • x: other exclusion • f: fell
ns: non-starter • nc: non-classify
Semi-finals: Heat 21: Riders placed 1st, 4th, 6th & 7th in the intermediate classification (after 20 heats)
Heat 22: Riders placed 2nd, 3rd, 5th & 8th in the intermediate classification (after 20 heats)
Big Final (heat 23): The first and second placed riders in each of the Semi-Finals

gate A – inside	gate B	gate C	gate D – outside

=== Heat after heat ===
1. (71,37) Lindbäck, Jonsson, Andersen, Lindgren
2. (71,67) Sayfutdinov, Hancock, N. Pedersen, Crump
3. (71,40) Holder, Ljung, B. Pedersen, Vaculík
4. (71,59) Bjerre, Harris, Gollob, Covatti
5. (72,43) Jonsson, Crump, Harris, B. Pedersen
6. (72,81) Sayfutdinov, Ljung, Lindgren, Gollob (R)
7. (72,69) N. Pedersen, Bjerre, Lindbäck, Holder
8. (72,62) Vaculík, Hancock, Covatti, Andersen
9. (73,28) Holder, Sayfutdinov, Jonsson, Covatti
10. (73,06) Crump, Vaculík, Lindgren, Bjerre (R)
11. (73,88) Hancock, Gollob, B. Pedersen, Lindbäck
12. (76,09) Ljung, Harris, N. Pedersen, Andersen
13. (74,38) Vaculík, Gollob, N. Pedersen, Jonsson
14. (74,41) Harris, Lindgren, Holder, Hancock
15. (74,15) Lindbäck, Crump, Ljung, Covatti
16. (76,00) Andersen, Sayfutdinov, B. Pedersen, Bjerre
17. (74,47) Hancock, Jonsson, Bjerre, Ljung
18. (74,34) N. Pedersen, Covatti, Lindgren, B. Pedersen
19. (73,25) Vaculík, Sayfutdinov, Lindbäck, Harris (X)
20. (73,59) Crump, Holder, Gollob, Andersen
  Semifinals
21. (73,07) Sayfutdinov, Lindbäck, N. Pedersen, Crump
22. (73,88) Vaculík, Hancock, Holder, Jonsson (F)
  the Final
23. (73,36) Lindbäck, Sayfutdinov, Hancock, Vaculík (X)

== The intermediate classification ==
Qualifies for next season's Grand Prix series
Full-time Grand Prix rider
Wild card, track reserve or qualified reserve

Pos.	Rider	Points	NZL (New Zealand)	EUR (Poland)	CZE (Czech Republic)	SWE (Sweden)	DEN (Denmark)	POL (Poland)	CRO (Croatia)	ITA (Italy)	GBR (United Kingdom)	SCA (Sweden)	NOR (Denmark)	PL2 (Poland)
1	(United States) (1) Greg Hancock	111	22	9	12	15	17	12	10	14				
2	(Denmark) (10) Nicki Pedersen	101	13	10	19	14	9	7	19	10				
3	(Australia) (4) Jason Crump	97	12	12	20	11	18	5	9	10				
4	(Australia) (8) Chris Holder	94	4	19	12	17	9	17	6	10				
5	(Russia) (6) Emil Sayfutdinov	84	8	7	10	12	11	10	7	19				
6	(Poland) (5) Tomasz Gollob	83	15	16	12	6	3	12	13	6				
7	(Sweden) (9) Fredrik Lindgren	77	8	8	6	15	15	11	9	5				
8	(Sweden) (2) Andreas Jonsson	70	4	13	3	10	8	9	15	8				
9	(Sweden) (12) Antonio Lindbäck	62	13	4	9	5	3	6	6	16				
10	(Poland) (3) Jarosław Hampel	46	18	15	6	7	ns	–	–	–				
11	(United Kingdom) (11) Chris Harris	46	5	3	6	3	10	1	10	8				
12	(Sweden) (14) Peter Ljung	44	4	6	5	6	8	7	0	8				
13	(Denmark) (15) Hans N. Andersen	43	6	5	6	3	4	7	8	4				
14	(Slovakia) (19) Martin Vaculík	42	–	–	–	–	–	20	8	14				
15	(Denmark) (7) Kenneth Bjerre	41	4	8	3	5	5	3	7	6				
16	(Denmark) (13) Bjarne Pedersen	41	7	2	6	4	10	4	5	3				
17	(Poland) (16) Bartosz Zmarzlik	13	–	–	–	–	–	13	–	–				
18	(Croatia) (16) Jurica Pavlic	12	–	–	–	–	–	–	12	–				
19	(Sweden) (16) Thomas H. Jonasson	11	–	–	–	11	–	–	–	–				
20	(Czech Republic) (16) Josef Franc	9	–	–	9	–	–	–	–	–				
21	(Poland) (16)(18) Przemysław Pawlicki	7	–	7	–	–	–	ns	–	–				
22	(Denmark) (16) Michael Jepsen Jensen	7	–	–	–	–	7	–	–	–				
23	(Denmark) (18) Mikkel B. Jensen	4	–	–	–	–	4	–	–	–				
24	(Italy) (16) Nicolas Covatti	3	–	–	–	–	–	–	–	3				
25	(Denmark) (17) Peter Kildemand	2	–	–	–	–	2	–	–	–				
26	(United Kingdom) (16) Jason Bunyan	1	1	–	–	–	–	–	–	–				
27	(Czech Republic) (17) Václav Milík, Jr.	0	–	–	0	–	–	–	–	–				
28	(Croatia) (17) Dino Kovacic	0	–	–	–	–	–	–	0	–				
Rider(s) not classified
	(New Zealand) (17) Grant Tregoning	—	ns	–	–	–	–	–	–	–				
	(New Zealand) (18) Sean Mason	—	ns	–	–	–	–	–	–	–				
	(Poland) (17) Tobiasz Musielak	—	–	ns	–	–	–	–	–	–				
	(Poland) (17)(18) Piotr Pawlicki, Jr.	—	–	ns	–	–	–	ns	–	–				
	(Czech Republic) (18) Matěj Kůs	—	–	–	ns	–	–	–	–	–				
	(Sweden) (17) Linus Sundström	—	–	–	–	ns	–	–	–	–				
	(Sweden) (18) Simon Gustafsson	—	–	–	–	ns	–	–	–	–				
	(Slovenia) (18) Samo Kukovica	—	–	–	–	–	–	–	ns	–				
	(Italy) (17) Michele Paco Castagna	—	–	–	–	–	–	–	–	ns				
	(Italy) (18) Nicolas Vicentin	—	–	–	–	–	–	–	–	ns				
Pos.	Rider	Points	NZL (New Zealand)	EUR (Poland)	CZE (Czech Republic)	SWE (Sweden)	DEN (Denmark)	POL (Poland)	CRO (Croatia)	ITA (Italy)	GBR (United Kingdom)	SCA (Sweden)	NOR (Denmark)	PL2 (Poland)

== See also ==
- motorcycle speedway
