= 2012 Speedway Grand Prix of Croatia =

- 2012 FIM Fogo Croatian SGP

Information
- Date: 28 July 2012
- City: (Croatia) Donji Kraljevec (Goričan)
- Event: 7 of 12 (151)
- Referee: (United Kingdom) Jim Lawrence
- Jury President: (Italy) Armando Castagna

Stadium details
- Stadium: Stadium Milenium
- Capacity: 7,500
- Length: 305 m (334 yd)
- Track: speedway

SGP Results
- Attendance: 5,500
- Best Time: (United States) Greg Hancock; 59,50 secs (in Heat 1)
- (gold) Winner: (Denmark) Nicki Pedersen
- (silver) Runner-up: (Sweden) Andreas Jonsson
- (bronze) 3rd place: (Poland) Tomasz Gollob

The 2012 FIM Fogo Croatian Speedway Grand Prix was the seventh race of the 2012 Speedway Grand Prix season. It took place on July 28 at the Stadium Milenium in Donji Kraljevec, Croatia.

The Grand Prix was won by Nicki Pedersen who beat Andreas Jonsson, Tomasz Gollob and wild card Jurica Pavlic.

== Riders ==
The Speedway Grand Prix Commission nominated Jurica Pavlic as Wild Card, and Dino Kovacic and Samo Kukovica both as Track Reserves. Injured Jarosław Hampel was replaced by first Qualified Substitutes, Martin Vaculík. The draw was made on July 27.

(3) (Poland) Jarosław Hampel → (19) (Slovakia) Martin Vaculík

== Heat details ==
Placing	Draw	Rider	Total	1	2	3	4	5	6	7	8	9	10	11	12	13	14	15	16	17	18	19	20	Pts	Pos	21	22	23
1	14	(Denmark) (10) Nicki Pedersen	19				3		2					2		3							1	11	1	2		3
2	12	(Sweden) (2) Andreas Jonsson	15			3					3		3			0						0		9	2		2	2
3	16	(Poland) (5) Tomasz Gollob	13				1				0	1						3			3			8	8		3	1
4	8	(Croatia) (16) Jurica Pavlic	12		1						2			3			2			1				9	7	3		0
5	6	(United Kingdom) (11) Chris Harris	10		0				3			3							2			1		9	4	1
6	1	(United States) (1) Greg Hancock	10	3				2				0				1				3				9	5		1
7	7	(Australia) (4) Jason Crump	9		3					1					3	2					0			9	3		0
8	2	(Sweden) (9) Fredrik Lindgren	9	2					1				2				3				1			9	6	X
9	13	(Slovakia) (19) Martin Vaculík	8				0	3							2		1					2		8	9
10	9	(Denmark) (15) Hans N. Andersen	8			2		1						0					3		2			8	10
11	4	(Russia) (6) Emil Sayfutdinov	7	1							1				1				1				3	7	11
12	15	(Denmark) (7) Kenneth Bjerre	7				2			2			1						0	2				7	12
13	3	(Sweden) (12) Antonio Lindbäck	6	0						0				1				2				3		6	13
14	11	(Australia) (8) Chris Holder	6			1				3		2					Fx						-	6	14
15	5	(Denmark) (13) Bjarne Pedersen	5		2			0					0					1					2	5	15
16	10	(Sweden) (14) Peter Ljung	0			0			0						0			0		0				0	16
17	17	(Croatia) (17) Dino Kovacic	0																				0	0	17
18	18	(Slovenia) (18) Samo Kukovica	-																					-	18
Placing	Draw	Rider	Total	1	2	3	4	5	6	7	8	9	10	11	12	13	14	15	16	17	18	19	20	Pts	Pos	21	22	23

e: retired or mechanical failure • m: exclusion for exceeding two minute time allowance • t: exclusion for touching the tapes • x: other exclusion • f: fell
ns: non-starter • nc: non-classify
Semi-finals: Heat 21: Riders placed 1st, 4th, 6th & 7th in the intermediate classification (after 20 heats)
Heat 22: Riders placed 2nd, 3rd, 5th & 8th in the intermediate classification (after 20 heats)
Big Final (heat 23): The first and second placed riders in each of the Semi-Finals

gate A – inside	gate B	gate C	gate D – outside

=== Heat after heat ===
1. (59,50) Hancock, Lindgren, Sayfutdinov, Lindbäck
2. (60,17) Crump, B.Pedersen, Pavlic, Harris
3. (60,01) Jonsson, Andersen, Holder, Ljung
4. (60,23) N.Pedersen, Bjerre, Gollob, Vaculík
5. (60,70) Vaculík, Hancock, Andersen, B.Pedersen
6. (60,14) Harris, N.Pedersen, Lindgren, Ljung
7. (60,03) Holder, Bjerre, Crump, Lindbäck
8. (61,04) Jonsson, Pavlic, Sayfutdinov, Gollob
9. (61,14) Harris, Holder, Gollob, Hancock
10. (61,32) Jonsson, Lindgren, Bjerre, B.Pedersen
11. (61,20) Pavlic, N.Pedersen, Lindbäck, Andersen
12. (61,21) Crump, Vaculík, Sayfutdinov, Ljung
13. (61,36) N.Pedersen, Crump, Hancock, Jonsson
14. (61,53) Lindgren, Pavlic, Vaculík, Holder (Fx)
15. (61,75) Gollob, Lindbäck, B.Pedersen, Ljung
16. (61,64) Andersen, Harris, Sayfutdinov, Bjerre
17. (61,85) Hancock, Bjerre, Pavlic, Ljung
18. (62,34) Gollob, Andersen, Lindgren, Crump
19. (61,68) Lindbäck, Vaculík, Harris, Jonsson
20. (61,73) Sayfutdinov, B.Pedersen, N.Pedersen, Kovacic
  Semifinals
21. (61,86) Pavlic, N.Pedersen, Harris, Lindgren (X)
22. (61,98) Gollob, Jonsson, Hancock, Crump
  the Final
23. (62,18) N.Pedersen, Jonsson, Gollob, Pavlic

== The intermediate classification ==
Qualifies for next season's Grand Prix series
Full-time Grand Prix rider
Wild card, track reserve or qualified reserve

Pos.	Rider	Points	NZL (New Zealand)	EUR (Poland)	CZE (Czech Republic)	SWE (Sweden)	DEN (Denmark)	POL (Poland)	CRO (Croatia)	ITA (Italy)	GBR (United Kingdom)	SCA (Sweden)	NOR (Denmark)	PL2 (Poland)
1	(United States) (1) Greg Hancock	97	22	9	12	15	17	12	10					
2	(Denmark) (10) Nicki Pedersen	91	13	10	19	14	9	7	19					
3	(Australia) (4) Jason Crump	87	12	12	20	11	18	5	9					
4	(Australia) (8) Chris Holder	84	4	19	12	17	9	17	6					
5	(Poland) (5) Tomasz Gollob	77	15	16	12	6	3	12	13					
6	(Sweden) (9) Fredrik Lindgren	72	8	8	6	15	15	11	9					
7	(Russia) (6) Emil Sayfutdinov	65	8	7	10	12	11	10	7					
8	(Sweden) (2) Andreas Jonsson	62	4	13	3	10	8	9	15					
9	(Poland) (3) Jarosław Hampel	46	18	15	6	7	ns	–	–					
10	(Sweden) (12) Antonio Lindbäck	46	13	4	9	5	3	6	6					
11	(Denmark) (15) Hans N. Andersen	39	6	5	6	3	4	7	8					
12	(United Kingdom) (11) Chris Harris	38	5	3	6	3	10	1	10					
13	(Denmark) (13) Bjarne Pedersen	38	7	2	6	4	10	4	5					
14	(Sweden) (14) Peter Ljung	36	4	6	5	6	8	7	0					
15	(Denmark) (7) Kenneth Bjerre	35	4	8	3	5	5	3	7					
16	(Slovakia) (19) Martin Vaculík	28	–	–	–	–	–	20	8					
17	(Poland) (16) Bartosz Zmarzlik	13	–	–	–	–	–	13	–					
18	(Croatia) (16) Jurica Pavlic	12	–	–	–	–	–	–	12					
19	(Sweden) (16) Thomas H. Jonasson	11	–	–	–	11	–	–	–					
20	(Czech Republic) (16) Josef Franc	9	–	–	9	–	–	–	–					
21	(Poland) (16)(18) Przemysław Pawlicki	7	–	7	–	–	–	ns	–					
22	(Denmark) (16) Michael Jepsen Jensen	7	–	–	–	–	7	–	–					
23	(Denmark) (18) Mikkel B. Jensen	4	–	–	–	–	4	–	–					
24	(Denmark) (17) Peter Kildemand	2	–	–	–	–	2	–	–					
25	(United Kingdom) (16) Jason Bunyan	1	1	–	–	–	–	–	–					
26	(Czech Republic) (17) Václav Milík, Jr.	0	–	–	0	–	–	–	–					
27	(Croatia) (17) Dino Kovacic	0	–	–	–	–	–	–	0					
Rider(s) not classified
	(New Zealand) (17) Grant Tregoning	—	ns	–	–	–	–	–	–					
	(New Zealand) (18) Sean Mason	—	ns	–	–	–	–	–	–					
	(Poland) (17) Tobiasz Musielak	—	–	ns	–	–	–	–	–					
	(Poland) (17)(18) Piotr Pawlicki, Jr.	—	–	ns	–	–	–	ns	–					
	(Czech Republic) (18) Matěj Kůs	—	–	–	ns	–	–	–	–					
	(Sweden) (17) Linus Sundström	—	–	–	–	ns	–	–	–					
	(Sweden) (18) Simon Gustafsson	—	–	–	–	ns	–	–	–					
	(Slovenia) (18) Samo Kukovica	—	–	–	–	–	–	–	ns					
Pos.	Rider	Points	NZL (New Zealand)	EUR (Poland)	CZE (Czech Republic)	SWE (Sweden)	DEN (Denmark)	POL (Poland)	CRO (Croatia)	ITA (Italy)	GBR (United Kingdom)	SCA (Sweden)	NOR (Denmark)	PL2 (Poland)

== See also ==
- motorcycle speedway
