= 2012 Speedway Grand Prix of Poland II =

- 2012 FIM Torun Speedway Grand Prix of Poland

Information
- Date: 6 October 2012
- City: (Poland) Toruń
- Event: 12 of 12 (156)
- Referee: (United Kingdom) Craig Ackroyd
- Jury President: (Germany) Wolfgang Glas

Stadium details
- Stadium: MotoArena Toruń
- Capacity: 15,500
- Length: 325 m (355 yd)
- Track: speedway

SGP Results
- Attendance: 16,000
- Best Time: (Australia) Chris Holder; 59,81 secs (in Heat 6)
- (gold) Winner: (Sweden) Antonio Lindbäck
- (silver) Runner-up: (Poland) Tomasz Gollob
- (bronze) 3rd place: (United States) Greg Hancock

The 2012 FIM Torun Speedway Grand Prix of Poland was the twelfth race meeting of the 2012 Speedway Grand Prix season. It took place on October 6 at the MotoArena Toruń in Toruń, Poland.

Former three-times World Champion, Jason Crump, announced his SGP retirement after the Toruń SGP.

The Grand Prix was won by Antonio Lindbäck who beat Tomasz Gollob, Greg Hancock and Chris Holder in the final.

== Riders ==
The Speedway Grand Prix Commission nominated Maciej Janowski as Wild Card, and Emil and Kamil Pulczyński both as Track Reserves. Injured Kenneth Bjerre was replaced by first Qualified Substitutes, Martin Vaculík. The draw was made on October 5.

(7) (Denmark) Kenneth Bjerre → (19) (Slovakia) Martin Vaculík

== Results ==
=== Heat details ===
Placing	Draw	Rider	Total	1	2	3	4	5	6	7	8	9	10	11	12	13	14	15	16	17	18	19	20	Pts	Pos	21	22	23
1	11	(Sweden) (12) Antonio Lindbäck	19			2				3		3					3						0	11	3		2	3
2	5	(Poland) (5) Tomasz Gollob	21		3			2					3					3					3	14	1	3		2
3	6	(United States) (1) Greg Hancock	13		2				0			2							3			2		9	6	2		1
4	14	(Australia) (8) Chris Holder	15				3		3					1		3							2	12	2		3	R
5	3	(Slovakia) (19) Martin Vaculík	12	3						2				3				0				3		11	4	1
6	10	(Russia) (6) Emil Sayfutdinov	11			3			2						2			1		3				11	5		0
7	7	(Denmark) (10) Nicki Pedersen	9		1					1					3	2					1			8	8		1
8	16	(Poland) (16) Maciej Janowski	8				0				3	1						2			2			8	7	0
9	13	(Sweden) (9) Fredrik Lindgren	8				2	3							1		1					1		8	9
10	9	(United Kingdom) (11) Chris Harris	6			1		1						0					1		3			6	10
11	1	(Denmark) (15) Hans N. Andersen	5	2				0				0				1				2				5	11
12	15	(Australia) (4) Jason Crump	5				1			0			1						2	1				5	12
13	4	(Sweden) (2) Andreas Jonsson	4	1							2				0				0				1	4	13
14	12	(Denmark) (13) Bjarne Pedersen	3			0					1		2			0						0		3	14
15	2	(Poland) (3) Jarosław Hampel	3	0					1				R				2				0			3	15
16	8	(Sweden) (14) Peter Ljung	2		0						0			2			0			0				2	16
17	17	(Poland) (17) Emil Pulczyński	-																					-	17
18	18	(Poland) (18) Kamil Pulczyński	-																					-	18
Placing	Draw	Rider	Total	1	2	3	4	5	6	7	8	9	10	11	12	13	14	15	16	17	18	19	20	Pts	Pos	21	22	23

e: retired or mechanical failure • m: exclusion for exceeding two minute time allowance • t: exclusion for touching the tapes • x: other exclusion • f: fell
ns: non-starter • nc: non-classify
Semi-finals: Heat 21: Riders placed 1st, 4th, 6th & 7th in the intermediate classification (after 20 heats)
Heat 22: Riders placed 2nd, 3rd, 5th & 8th in the intermediate classification (after 20 heats)
Big Final (heat 23): The first and second placed riders in each of the Semi-Finals

gate A – inside	gate B	gate C	gate D – outside

=== Heat after heat ===
1. (60,97) Vaculík, Andersen, Jonsson, Hampel
2. (60,87) Gollob, Hancock, N.Pedersen, Ljung
3. (60,68) Sayfutdinov, Lindbäck, Harris, B.Pedersen
4. (60,10) Holder, Lindgren, Crump, Janowski
5. (59,97) Lindgren, Gollob, Harris, Andersen
6. (59,80) Holder, Sayfutdinov, Hampel, Hancock
7. (59,87) Lindbäck, Vaculík, N.Pedersen, Crump
8. (60,22) Janowski, Jonsson, B.Pedersen, Ljung
9. (60,15) Lindbäck, Hancock, Janowski, Andersen
10. (60,81) Gollob, B.Pedersen, Crump, Hampel (R)
11. (60,97) Vaculík, Ljung, Holder, Harris
12. (60,10) N.Pedersen, Sayfutdinov, Lindgren, Jonsson
13. (60,29) Holder, N.Pedersen, Andersen, B.Pedersen
14. (60,13) Lindbäck, Hampel, Lindgren, Ljung
15. (60,25) Gollob, Janowski, Sayfutdinov, Vaculík
16. (60,56) Hancock, Crump, Harris, Jonsson
17. (60,41) Sayfutdinov, Andersen, Crump, Ljung
18. (60,40) Harris, Janowski, N.Pedersen, Hampel
19. (60,62) Vaculík, Hancock, Lindgren, B.Pedersen
20. (60,53) Gollob, Holder, Jonsson, Lindbäck
  Semifinals
21. (59,94)21. Gollob, Hancock, Vaculik, Janowski
22. (60,87)22. Holder, Lindbäck, N.Pedersen, Sayfutdinov
  the Final
23. (60,75)23. Lindbäck, Gollob, Hancock, Holder (R1)

== The final classification ==
Qualifies for next season's Grand Prix series
Full-time Grand Prix rider
Wild card, track reserve or qualified reserve

Pos.	Rider	Points	NZL (New Zealand)	EUR (Poland)	CZE (Czech Republic)	SWE (Sweden)	DEN (Denmark)	POL (Poland)	CRO (Croatia)	ITA (Italy)	GBR (United Kingdom)	SCA (Sweden)	NOR (Denmark)	PL2 (Poland)
Gold	(Australia) (8) Chris Holder	160	4	19	12	17	9	17	6	10	23	17	11	15
Silver	(Denmark) (10) Nicki Pedersen	152	13	10	19	14	9	7	19	10	11	11	20	9
Bronze	(United States) (1) Greg Hancock	148	22	9	12	15	17	12	10	14	7	8	9	13
4	(Poland) (5) Tomasz Gollob	142	15	16	12	6	3	12	13	6	10	21	7	21
5	(Russia) (6) Emil Sayfutdinov	133	8	7	10	12	11	10	7	19	12	11	15	11
6	(Australia) (4) Jason Crump	126	12	12	20	11	18	5	9	10	6	8	10	5
7	(Sweden) (12) Antonio Lindbäck	122	13	4	9	5	3	6	6	16	12	18	11	19
8	(Sweden) (9) Fredrik Lindgren	119	8	8	6	15	15	11	9	5	12	11	11	8
9	(Sweden) (2) Andreas Jonsson	88	4	13	3	10	8	9	15	8	6	1	7	4
10	(Denmark) (15) Hans N. Andersen	69	6	5	6	3	4	7	8	4	10	5	6	5
11	(Slovakia) (19) Martin Vaculík	67	–	–	–	–	–	20	8	14	7	6	–	12
12	(United Kingdom) (11) Chris Harris	65	5	3	6	3	10	1	10	8	6	5	2	6
13	(Denmark) (13) Bjarne Pedersen	59	7	2	6	4	10	4	5	3	2	6	7	3
14	(Poland) (3) Jarosław Hampel	58	18	15	6	7	ns	–	–	–	–	6	3	3
15	(Sweden) (14) Peter Ljung	57	4	6	5	6	8	7	0	8	0	5	6	2
16	(Denmark) (7) Kenneth Bjerre	41	4	8	3	5	5	3	7	6	–	–	–	–
17	(Denmark) (16) Michael Jepsen Jensen	22	–	–	–	–	7	–	–	–	–	–	15	–
18	(Poland) (20) Krzysztof Kasprzak	17	–	–	–	–	–	–	–	–	13	–	4	–
19	(Sweden) (16) Thomas H. Jonasson	16	–	–	–	11	–	–	–	–	–	5	–	–
20	(Poland) (16) Bartosz Zmarzlik	13	–	–	–	–	–	13	–	–	–	–	–	–
21	(Croatia) (16) Jurica Pavlic	12	–	–	–	–	–	–	12	–	–	–	–	–
22	(Czech Republic) (16) Josef Franc	9	–	–	9	–	–	–	–	–	–	–	–	–
23	(Poland) (16) Maciej Janowski	8	–	–	–	–	–	–	–	–	–	–	–	8
24	(Poland) (16)(18) Przemysław Pawlicki	7	–	7	–	–	–	ns	–	–	–	–	–	–
25	(United Kingdom) (16) Scott Nicholls	7	–	–	–	–	–	–	–	–	7	–	–	–
26	(Denmark) (17)(18) Mikkel B. Jensen	4	–	–	–	–	4	–	–	–	–	–	ns	–
27	(Italy) (16) Nicolas Covatti	3	–	–	–	–	–	–	–	3	–	–	–	–
28	(Denmark) (17) Peter Kildemand	2	–	–	–	–	2	–	–	–	–	–	–	–
29	(United Kingdom) (16) Jason Bunyan	1	1	–	–	–	–	–	–	–	–	–	–	–
30	(Czech Republic) (17) Václav Milík, Jr.	0	–	–	0	–	–	–	–	–	–	–	–	–
31	(Croatia) (17) Dino Kovacic	0	–	–	–	–	–	–	0	–	–	–	–	–
32	(Sweden) (17)(18) Linus Sundström	0	–	–	–	ns	–	–	–	–	–	0	–	–
33	(Sweden) (17) Kim Nilsson	0	–	–	–	–	–	–	–	–	–	0	–	–
Rider(s) not classified
	(New Zealand) (17) Grant Tregoning	—	ns	–	–	–	–	–	–	–	–	–	–	–
	(New Zealand) (18) Sean Mason	—	ns	–	–	–	–	–	–	–	–	–	–	–
	(Poland) (17) Tobiasz Musielak	—	–	ns	–	–	–	–	–	–	–	–	–	–
	(Poland) (17)(18) Piotr Pawlicki, Jr.	—	–	ns	–	–	–	ns	–	–	–	–	–	–
	(Czech Republic) (18) Matěj Kůs	—	–	–	ns	–	–	–	–	–	–	–	–	–
	(Sweden) (18) Simon Gustafsson	—	–	–	–	ns	–	–	–	–	–	–	–	–
	(Slovenia) (18) Samo Kukovica	—	–	–	–	–	–	–	ns	–	–	–	–	–
	(Italy) (17) Michele Paco Castagna	—	–	–	–	–	–	–	–	ns	–	–	–	–
	(Italy) (18) Nicolas Vicentin	—	–	–	–	–	–	–	–	ns	–	–	–	–
	(United Kingdom) (17) Ben Barker	—	–	–	–	–	–	–	–	–	ns	–	–	–
	(United Kingdom) (18) Josh Auty	—	–	–	–	–	–	–	–	–	ns	–	–	–
	(Denmark) (18) Nicklas Porsing	—	–	–	–	–	–	–	–	–	–	–	ns	–
	(Poland) (17) Emil Pulczyński	—	–	–	–	–	–	–	–	–	–	–	–	ns
	(Poland) (18) Kamil Pulczyński	—	–	–	–	–	–	–	–	–	–	–	–	ns
Pos.	Rider	Points	NZL (New Zealand)	EUR (Poland)	CZE (Czech Republic)	SWE (Sweden)	DEN (Denmark)	POL (Poland)	CRO (Croatia)	ITA (Italy)	GBR (United Kingdom)	SCA (Sweden)	NOR (Denmark)	PL2 (Poland)

== See also ==
- motorcycle speedway
