= 2012 Speedway Grand Prix of Great Britain =

(United Kingdom) 2012 Speedway Grand Prix of Great Britain
- 2012 FIM Fogo British SGP

Information
- Date: 25 August 2012
- City: (United Kingdom) (Wales) Cardiff
- Event: 9 of 12 (153)
- Referee: (Sweden) Krister Gardell
- Jury President: (Finland) Ilkka Teromaa

Stadium details
- Stadium: Millennium Stadium
- Capacity: 62,500
- Length: 277 m (303 yd)
- Track: temporary (rugby, football/soccer)

SGP Results
- Attendance: 38,000
- Best Time: (Denmark) Nicki Pedersen; 54,3 secs (in Heat 2)
- (gold) Winner: (Australia) Chris Holder
- (silver) Runner-up: (Poland) Krzysztof Kasprzak
- (bronze) 3rd place: (Sweden) Antonio Lindback

The 2012 Speedway Grand Prix of Great Britain, also known as the 2012 FIM Fogo British Speedway Grand Prix for sponsorship reasons, was the ninth race of the 2012 Speedway Grand Prix season. It took place on 25 August at the Millennium Stadium in Cardiff, Wales, United Kingdom.

The Grand Prix was won by Chris Holder who beat Krzysztof Kasprzak, Antonio Lindbäck and Fredrik Lindgren in the final. 1950 and 1953 World Champion Freddie Williams, Wales' only Speedway World Champion, presented the winners trophy to Holder.

== Riders ==
The Speedway Grand Prix Commission nominated Scott Nicholls as Wild Card, and Ben Barker and Craig Cook both as Track Reserves. Injured Craig Cook (carpus broken) was replaced by Josh Auty. Injured Jarosław Hampel and Kenneth Bjerre was replaced by first and second Qualified Substitutes, Martin Vaculík and Krzysztof Kasprzak. The draw was made on 24 August.

(3) (Poland) Jarosław Hampel → (19) (Slovakia) Martin Vaculík
(7) (Denmark) Kenneth Bjerre → (20) (Poland) Krzysztof Kasprzak
(18) (United Kingdom) Craig Cook → (18) (United Kingdom) Josh Auty

== Heat details ==
Placing	Draw	Rider	Total	1	2	3	4	5	6	7	8	9	10	11	12	13	14	15	16	17	18	19	20	Pts	Pos	21	22	23
1	8	(Australia) (8) Chris Holder	23		2						3			3			3			3				14	1	3		3
2	3	(Poland) (20) Krzysztof Kasprzak	13	0						3				0				2				2		7	8		2	2
3	2	(Sweden) (12) Antonio Lindbäck	12	3					0				2				2				1			8	7	2		1
4	16	(Sweden) (9) Fredrik Lindgren	12				0				1	2						3			3			9	5		3	0
5	4	(Russia) (6) Emil Sayfutdinov	12	1							2				2				3				3	11	3		1
6	6	(Denmark) (10) Nicki Pedersen	11		3				1			3							1			3		11	2		0
7	14	(Denmark) (15) Hans N. Andersen	10				3		3					2		2							R	10	4	0
8	7	(Poland) (5) Tomasz Gollob	10		0					1					3	3					2			9	6	1
9	11	(Slovakia) (19) Martin Vaculík	7			3				2		0					0						2	7	9
10	1	(United States) (1) Greg Hancock	7	2				3				1				1				R				7	10
11	13	(United Kingdom) (16) Scott Nicholls	7				2	2							1		1					1		7	11
12	5	(Sweden) (2) Andreas Jonsson	6		1			1					3					0					1	6	12
13	15	(United Kingdom) (11) Chris Harris	6				1			0			1						2	2				6	13
14	10	(Australia) (4) Jason Crump	6			2			2						X			1		1				6	14
15	9	(Denmark) (13) Bjarne Pedersen	2			1		0						1					0		0			2	15
16	12	(Sweden) (14) Peter Ljung	0			0					0		0			0						0		0	16
17	17	(United Kingdom) (17) Ben Barker	-																					-	17
18	18	(United Kingdom) (18) Josh Auty	-																					-	18
Placing	Draw	Rider	Total	1	2	3	4	5	6	7	8	9	10	11	12	13	14	15	16	17	18	19	20	Pts	Pos	21	22	23

e: retired or mechanical failure • m: exclusion for exceeding two minute time allowance • t: exclusion for touching the tapes • x: other exclusion • f: fell
ns: non-starter • nc: non-classify
Semi-finals: Heat 21: Riders placed 1st, 4th, 6th & 7th in the intermediate classification (after 20 heats)
Heat 22: Riders placed 2nd, 3rd, 5th & 8th in the intermediate classification (after 20 heats)
Big Final (heat 23): The first and second placed riders in each of the Semi-Finals

gate A – inside	gate B	gate C	gate D – outside

=== Heat after heat ===
1. (55,2) Lindbäck, Hancock, Sayfutdinov, Kasprzak
2. (54,3) N.Pedersen, Holder, Jonsson, Gollob
3. (54,6) Vaculík, Crump, B.Pedersen, Ljung
4. (55,3) Andersen, Nicholls, Harris, Lindgren
5. (54,9) Hancock, Nicholls, Jonsson, B.Pedersen
6. (55,2) Andersen, Crump, N.Pedersen, Lindbäck
7. (55,6) Kasprzak, Vaculík, Gollob, Harris
8. (55,9) Holder, Sayfutdinov, Lindgren, Ljung
9. (56,2) N.Pedersen, Lindgren, Hancock, Vaculík
10. (56,1) Jonsson, Lindbäck, Harris, Ljung
11. (56,2) Holder, Andersen, B.Pedersen, Kasprzak
12. (56,3) Gollob, Sayfutdinov, Nicholls, Crump (X)
13. (55,6) Gollob, Andersen, Hancock, Ljung
14. (55,3) Holder, Lindbäck, Nicholls, Vaculík
15. (55,7) Lindgren, Kasprzak, Crump, Jonsson
16. (55,8) Sayfutdinov, Harris, N.Pedersen, B.Pedersen
17. (55,5) Holder, Harris, Crump, Hancock (R)
18. (55,9) Lindgren, Gollob, Lindbäck, B.Pedersen
19. (56,3) N.Pedersen, Kasprzak, Nicholls, Ljung
20. (56,2) Sayfutdinov, Vaculík, Jonsson, Andersen (R)
  Semifinals
21. (55,5) Holder, Lindbäck, Gollob, Andersen
22. (55,9) Lindgren, Kasprzak, Sayfutdinov, N.Pedersen
  the Final
23. (55,7) Holder, Kasprzak, Lindbäck, Lindgren

== The intermediate classification ==
Qualifies for next season's Grand Prix series
Full-time Grand Prix rider
Wild card, track reserve or qualified reserve

Pos.	Rider	Points	NZL (New Zealand)	EUR (Poland)	CZE (Czech Republic)	SWE (Sweden)	DEN (Denmark)	POL (Poland)	CRO (Croatia)	ITA (Italy)	GBR (United Kingdom)	SCA (Sweden)	NOR (Denmark)	PL2 (Poland)
1	(United States) (1) Greg Hancock	118	22	9	12	15	17	12	10	14	7			
2	(Australia) (8) Chris Holder	117	4	19	12	17	9	17	6	10	23			
3	(Denmark) (10) Nicki Pedersen	112	13	10	19	14	9	7	19	10	11			
4	(Australia) (4) Jason Crump	103	12	12	20	11	18	5	9	10	6			
5	(Russia) (6) Emil Sayfutdinov	96	8	7	10	12	11	10	7	19	12			
6	(Poland) (5) Tomasz Gollob	93	15	16	12	6	3	12	13	6	10			
7	(Sweden) (9) Fredrik Lindgren	89	8	8	6	15	15	11	9	5	12			
8	(Sweden) (2) Andreas Jonsson	76	4	13	3	10	8	9	15	8	6			
9	(Sweden) (12) Antonio Lindbäck	74	13	4	9	5	3	6	6	16	12			
10	(Denmark) (15) Hans N. Andersen	53	6	5	6	3	4	7	8	4	10			
11	(United Kingdom) (11) Chris Harris	52	5	3	6	3	10	1	10	8	6			
12	(Slovakia) (19) Martin Vaculík	49	–	–	–	–	–	20	8	14	7			
13	(Poland) (3) Jarosław Hampel	46	18	15	6	7	ns	–	–	–	–			
14	(Sweden) (14) Peter Ljung	44	4	6	5	6	8	7	0	8	0			
15	(Denmark) (13) Bjarne Pedersen	43	7	2	6	4	10	4	5	3	2			
16	(Denmark) (7) Kenneth Bjerre	41	4	8	3	5	5	3	7	6	–			
17	(Poland) (16) Bartosz Zmarzlik	13	–	–	–	–	–	13	–	–	–			
18	(Poland) (20) Krzysztof Kasprzak	13	–	–	–	–	–	–	–	–	13			
19	(Croatia) (16) Jurica Pavlic	12	–	–	–	–	–	–	12	–	–			
20	(Sweden) (16) Thomas H. Jonasson	11	–	–	–	11	–	–	–	–	–			
21	(Czech Republic) (16) Josef Franc	9	–	–	9	–	–	–	–	–	–			
22	(Poland) (16)(18) Przemysław Pawlicki	7	–	7	–	–	–	ns	–	–	–			
23	(Denmark) (16) Michael Jepsen Jensen	7	–	–	–	–	7	–	–	–	–			
24	(United Kingdom) (16) Scott Nicholls	7	–	–	–	–	–	–	–	–	7			
25	(Denmark) (18) Mikkel B. Jensen	4	–	–	–	–	4	–	–	–	–			
26	(Italy) (16) Nicolas Covatti	3	–	–	–	–	–	–	–	3	–			
27	(Denmark) (17) Peter Kildemand	2	–	–	–	–	2	–	–	–	–			
28	(United Kingdom) (16) Jason Bunyan	1	1	–	–	–	–	–	–	–	–			
29	(Czech Republic) (17) Václav Milík, Jr.	0	–	–	0	–	–	–	–	–	–			
30	(Croatia) (17) Dino Kovacic	0	–	–	–	–	–	–	0	–	–			
Rider(s) not classified
	(New Zealand) (17) Grant Tregoning	—	ns	–	–	–	–	–	–	–	–			
	(New Zealand) (18) Sean Mason	—	ns	–	–	–	–	–	–	–	–			
	(Poland) (17) Tobiasz Musielak	—	–	ns	–	–	–	–	–	–	–			
	(Czech Republic) (18) Matěj Kůs	—	–	–	ns	–	–	–	–	–	–			
	(Sweden) (17) Linus Sundström	—	–	–	–	ns	–	–	–	–	–			
	(Sweden) (18) Simon Gustafsson	—	–	–	–	ns	–	–	–	–	–			
	(Poland) (18) Przemysław Pawlicki	—	–	–	–	–	–	ns	–	–	–			
	(Slovenia) (18) Samo Kukovica	—	–	–	–	–	–	–	ns	–	–			
	(Italy) (17) Michele Paco Castagna	—	–	–	–	–	–	–	–	ns	–			
	(Italy) (18) Nicolas Vicentin	—	–	–	–	–	–	–	–	ns	–			
	(United Kingdom) (17) Ben Barker	—	–	–	–	–	–	–	–	–	ns			
	(United Kingdom) (18) Josh Auty	—	–	–	–	–	–	–	–	–	ns			
Pos.	Rider	Points	NZL (New Zealand)	EUR (Poland)	CZE (Czech Republic)	SWE (Sweden)	DEN (Denmark)	POL (Poland)	CRO (Croatia)	ITA (Italy)	GBR (United Kingdom)	SCA (Sweden)	NOR (Denmark)	PL2 (Poland)

== See also ==
- motorcycle speedway
