= 2012 Speedway Grand Prix of Scandinavia =

(Sweden) 2012 Speedway Grand Prix of Scandinavia
- 2012 FIM Scandinavian SGP

Information
- Date: 8 September 2012
- City: (Sweden) Målilla
- Event: 10 of 12 (154)
- Referee: (Poland) Wojciech Grodzki
- Jury President: (United Kingdom) Anthony Steele

Stadium details
- Stadium: G&B Stadium
- Capacity: 15,000
- Length: 305 m (334 yd)
- Track: speedway

SGP Results
- Attendance: 11,900
- Best Time: (Sweden) Antonio Lindbäck; 57,89 secs (in Heat 21)
- (gold) Winner: (Poland) Tomasz Gollob
- (silver) Runner-up: (Australia) Chris Holder
- (bronze) 3rd place: (Sweden) Antonio Lindback

The 2012 FIM Scandinavian Speedway Grand Prix will be the tenth race of the 2012 Speedway Grand Prix season. It took place on September 8 at the G&B Stadium in Målilla, Sweden.

The Grand Prix was won by Tomasz Gollob who beat Chris Holder, Antonio Lindbäck and Nicki Pedersen in the final.

== Riders ==
The Speedway Grand Prix Commission nominated Thomas H. Jonasson as Wild Card, and Kim Nilsson and Linus Sundström both as Track Reserves. Injured Kenneth Bjerre was replaced by first Qualified Substitutes, Martin Vaculík. The draw was made on September 7.

(7) (Denmark) Kenneth Bjerre → (19) (Slovakia) Martin Vaculík

== Results ==
=== Heat details ===
Placing	Draw	Rider	Total	1	2	3	4	5	6	7	8	9	10	11	12	13	14	15	16	17	18	19	20	Pts	Pos	21	22	23
1	16	(Poland) (5) Tomasz Gollob	21				3				1	3						3			3			13	2		2	3
2	4	(Australia) (8) Chris Holder	17	1							2				3				1				3	10	5		3	2
3	12	(Sweden) (12) Antonio Lindbäck	18			1					3		3			3						3		13	1	3		1
4	9	(Denmark) (10) Nicki Pedersen	11			2		X						3					2		2			9	6	2		0
5	6	(Sweden) (9) Fredrik Lindgren	11		3				1			2							3			1		10	3		1
6	1	(Russia) (6) Emil Sayfutdinov	11	3				3				1				1				2				10	4	1
7	15	(United States) (1) Greg Hancock	8				2			3			0						0	3				8	7	0
8	2	(Australia) (4) Jason Crump	8	0					3				2				2				1			8	8		0
9	3	(Denmark) (13) Bjarne Pedersen	6	2						0				0				2				2		6	9
10	5	(Slovakia) (19) Martin Vaculík	6		1			2					1					0					2	6	10
11	14	(Poland) (3) Jarosław Hampel	6				1		0					2		2							1	6	11
12	8	(Sweden) (16) Thomas H. Jonasson	5		0						0			1			3			1				5	12
13	11	(Sweden) (14) Peter Ljung	5			3				1		0					1						0	5	13
14	10	(United Kingdom) (11) Chris Harris	5			0			2						2			1		0				5	14
15	7	(Denmark) (15) Hans N. Andersen	5		2					2					1	0					0			5	15
16	13	(Sweden) (2) Andreas Jonsson	1				0	1							-		-					-		1	16
17	17	(Sweden) (17) Kim Nilsson	0												0							0		0	17
18	18	(Sweden) (18) Linus Sundström	0														0							0	18
Placing	Draw	Rider	Total	1	2	3	4	5	6	7	8	9	10	11	12	13	14	15	16	17	18	19	20	Pts	Pos	21	22	23

e: retired or mechanical failure • m: exclusion for exceeding two minute time allowance • t: exclusion for touching the tapes • x: other exclusion • f: fell
ns: non-starter • nc: non-classify
Semi-finals: Heat 21: Riders placed 1st, 4th, 6th & 7th in the intermediate classification (after 20 heats)
Heat 22: Riders placed 2nd, 3rd, 5th & 8th in the intermediate classification (after 20 heats)
Big Final (heat 23): The first and second placed riders in each of the Semi-Finals

gate A – inside	gate B	gate C	gate D – outside

=== Heat after heat ===
1. (58,46) Sayfutdinov, B.Pedersen, Holder, Crump
2. (58,21) Lindgren, Andersen, Vaculík, Jonasson
3. (58,53) Ljung, N.Pedersen, Lindbäck, Harris
4. (58,69) Gollob, Hancock, Hampel, Jonsson
5. (57,94) Sayfutdinov, Vaculík, Jonsson, N.Pedersen (X)
6. (58,82) Crump, Harris, Lindgren, Hampel
7. (58,12) Hancock, Andersen, Ljung, B.Pedersen
8. (59,57) Lindbäck, Holder, Gollob, Jonasson
9. (58,53) Gollob, Lindgren, Sayfutdinov, Ljung
10. (59,13) Lindbäck, Crump, Vaculík, Hancock
11. (59,94) N.Pedersen, Hampel, Jonasson, B.Pedersen
12. (59,53) Holder, Harris, Andersen, Nilsson
13. (59,78) Lindbäck, Hampel, Sayfutdinov, Andersen
14. (59,71) Jonasson, Crump, Ljung, Sundström
15. (59,84) Gollob, B.Pedersen, Harris, Vaculík
16. (59,93) Lindgren, N.Pedersen, Holder, Hancock
17. (58,14) Hancock, Sayfutdinov, Jonasson, Harris
18. (59,77) Gollob, N.Pedersen, Crump, Andersen
19. (59,84) Lindbäck, B.Pedersen, Lindgren, Nilsson
20. (60,21) Holder, Vaculík, Hampel, Ljung
  Semifinals
21. (57,89) Lindbäck, N.Pedersen, Sayfutdinov, Hancock
22. (59,05) Holder, Gollob, Lindgren, Crump
  Final
23. (59,55) Gollob, Holder, Lindbäck, N.Pedersen

== The intermediate classification ==
Qualifies for next season's Grand Prix series
Full-time Grand Prix rider
Wild card, track reserve or qualified reserve

Pos.	Rider	Points	NZL (New Zealand)	EUR (Poland)	CZE (Czech Republic)	SWE (Sweden)	DEN (Denmark)	POL (Poland)	CRO (Croatia)	ITA (Italy)	GBR (United Kingdom)	SCA (Sweden)	NOR (Denmark)	PL2 (Poland)
1	(Australia) (8) Chris Holder	134	4	19	12	17	9	17	6	10	23	17		
2	(United States) (1) Greg Hancock	126	22	9	12	15	17	12	10	14	7	8		
3	(Denmark) (10) Nicki Pedersen	123	13	10	19	14	9	7	19	10	11	11		
4	(Poland) (5) Tomasz Gollob	114	15	16	12	6	3	12	13	6	10	21		
5	(Australia) (4) Jason Crump	111	12	12	20	11	18	5	9	10	6	8		
6	(Russia) (6) Emil Sayfutdinov	107	8	7	10	12	11	10	7	19	12	11		
7	(Sweden) (9) Fredrik Lindgren	100	8	8	6	15	15	11	9	5	12	11		
8	(Sweden) (12) Antonio Lindbäck	92	13	4	9	5	3	6	6	16	12	18		
9	(Sweden) (2) Andreas Jonsson	77	4	13	3	10	8	9	15	8	6	1		
10	(Denmark) (15) Hans N. Andersen	58	6	5	6	3	4	7	8	4	10	5		
11	(United Kingdom) (11) Chris Harris	57	5	3	6	3	10	1	10	8	6	5		
12	(Slovakia) (19) Martin Vaculík	55	–	–	–	–	–	20	8	14	7	6		
13	(Poland) (3) Jarosław Hampel	52	18	15	6	7	ns	–	–	–	–	6		
14	(Denmark) (13) Bjarne Pedersen	49	7	2	6	4	10	4	5	3	2	6		
15	(Sweden) (14) Peter Ljung	49	4	6	5	6	8	7	0	8	0	5		
16	(Denmark) (7) Kenneth Bjerre	41	4	8	3	5	5	3	7	6	–	–		
17	(Sweden) (16) Thomas H. Jonasson	16	–	–	–	11	–	–	–	–	–	5		
18	(Poland) (16) Bartosz Zmarzlik	13	–	–	–	–	–	13	–	–	–	–		
19	(Poland) (20) Krzysztof Kasprzak	13	–	–	–	–	–	–	–	–	13	–		
20	(Croatia) (16) Jurica Pavlic	12	–	–	–	–	–	–	12	–	–	–		
21	(Czech Republic) (16) Josef Franc	9	–	–	9	–	–	–	–	–	–	–		
22	(Poland) (16)(18) Przemysław Pawlicki	7	–	7	–	–	–	ns	–	–	–	–		
23	(Denmark) (16) Michael Jepsen Jensen	7	–	–	–	–	7	–	–	–	–	–		
24	(United Kingdom) (16) Scott Nicholls	7	–	–	–	–	–	–	–	–	7	–		
25	(Denmark) (18) Mikkel B. Jensen	4	–	–	–	–	4	–	–	–	–	–		
26	(Italy) (16) Nicolas Covatti	3	–	–	–	–	–	–	–	3	–	–		
27	(Denmark) (17) Peter Kildemand	2	–	–	–	–	2	–	–	–	–	–		
28	(United Kingdom) (16) Jason Bunyan	1	1	–	–	–	–	–	–	–	–	–		
29	(Czech Republic) (17) Václav Milík, Jr.	0	–	–	0	–	–	–	–	–	–	–		
30	(Croatia) (17) Dino Kovacic	0	–	–	–	–	–	–	0	–	–	–		
31	(Sweden) (17)(18) Linus Sundström	0	–	–	–	ns	–	–	–	–	–	0		
32	(Sweden) (17) Kim Nilsson	0	–	–	–	–	–	–	–	–	–	0		
Rider(s) not classified
	(New Zealand) (17) Grant Tregoning	—	ns	–	–	–	–	–	–	–	–	–		
	(New Zealand) (18) Sean Mason	—	ns	–	–	–	–	–	–	–	–	–		
	(Poland) (17) Tobiasz Musielak	—	–	ns	–	–	–	–	–	–	–	–		
	(Poland) (17)(18) Piotr Pawlicki, Jr.	—	–	ns	–	–	–	ns	–	–	–	–		
	(Czech Republic) (18) Matěj Kůs	—	–	–	ns	–	–	–	–	–	–	–		
	(Sweden) (18) Simon Gustafsson	—	–	–	–	ns	–	–	–	–	–	–		
	(Slovenia) (18) Samo Kukovica	—	–	–	–	–	–	–	ns	–	–	–		
	(Italy) (17) Michele Paco Castagna	—	–	–	–	–	–	–	–	ns	–	–		
	(Italy) (18) Nicolas Vicentin	—	–	–	–	–	–	–	–	ns	–	–		
	(United Kingdom) (17) Ben Barker	—	–	–	–	–	–	–	–	–	ns	–		
	(United Kingdom) (18) Josh Auty	—	–	–	–	–	–	–	–	–	ns	–		
Pos.	Rider	Points	NZL (New Zealand)	EUR (Poland)	CZE (Czech Republic)	SWE (Sweden)	DEN (Denmark)	POL (Poland)	CRO (Croatia)	ITA (Italy)	GBR (United Kingdom)	SCA (Sweden)	NOR (Denmark)	PL2 (Poland)

== See also ==
- motorcycle speedway
