= 2012 Speedway Grand Prix of Nordic =

Speedway world championship event

(Denmark) 2012 Speedway Grand Prix of Nordic
- 2012 FIM Dansk Metal Nordic SGP

Information
- Date: 22 September 2012
- City: (Denmark) Vojens
- Event: 11 of 12 (155)
- Referee: Jim Lawrence
- Jury President: Armando Castagna

Stadium details
- Stadium: Vojens Speedway Center
- Capacity: 20,000
- Length: 300 m (330 yd)
- Track: speedway

SGP Results
- Attendance: 20,000
- Best Time: (Denmark) Nicki Pedersen; 57,79 secs (in Heat 5)
- (gold) Winner: (Denmark) Michael Jepsen Jensen
- (silver) Runner-up: (Denmark) Nicki Pedersen
- (bronze) 3rd place: (Russia) Emil Sayfutdinov

The 2012 FIM Dansk Metal Nordic Speedway Grand Prix was the eleventh race of the 2012 Speedway Grand Prix season. It took place on 22 September at the Vojens Speedway Center in Vojens, Denmark.

The Grand Prix was won by wild card Michael Jepsen Jensen who beat Nicki Pedersen, Emil Sayfutdinov and Jason Crump in the final.

== Riders ==
The Speedway Grand Prix Commission nominated Michael Jepsen Jensen as Wild Card, and Mikkel B Jensen and Nicklas Porsing both as Track Reserves. Injured Kenneth Bjerre was replaced by second Qualified Substitutes, Krzysztof Kasprzak. First Qualified Substitutes, Martin Vaculík, had problems with blood pressure. The draw was made on 21 September.

(7) (Denmark) Kenneth Bjerre → (20) (Poland) Krzysztof Kasprzak

== Results ==
=== Heat details ===
Placing	Draw	Rider	Total	1	2	3	4	5	6	7	8	9	10	11	12	13	14	15	16	17	18	19	20	Pts	Pos	21	22	23
1	14	(Denmark) (16) Michael Jepsen Jensen	15				1		1					2		3							0	7	8		2	3
2	5	(Denmark) (10) Nicki Pedersen	20		3			3					3					2					2	13	1	3		2
3	4	(Russia) (6) Emil Sayfutdinov	15	1							3				2				3				1	10	5		3	1
4	8	(Australia) (4) Jason Crump	10		2						2			3			R			1				8	7	2		0
5	3	(Sweden) (12) Antonio Lindbäck	11	3						3				1				3				1		11	2		0
6	1	(Australia) (8) Chris Holder	11	2				1				3				1				3				10	3		1
7	11	(Sweden) (9) Fredrik Lindgren	11			1				2		1					3						3	10	4	1
8	2	(United States) (1) Greg Hancock	9	0					3				2				2				2			9	6	0
9	7	(Poland) (5) Tomasz Gollob	7		0					1					3	2					1			7	9
10	13	(Sweden) (2) Andreas Jonsson	7				R	2							1		1					3		7	10
11	15	(Denmark) (13) Bjarne Pedersen	7				2			0			1						2	2				7	11
12	16	(Sweden) (14) Peter Ljung	6				3				1	2						0			R			6	12
13	6	(Denmark) (15) Hans N. Andersen	6		1				2			0							1			2		6	13
14	10	(Poland) (20) Krzysztof Kasprzak	4			3			0						X			1		R				4	14
15	9	(Poland) (3) Jarosław Hampel	3			0		0						0					0		3			3	15
16	12	(United Kingdom) (11) Chris Harris	2			2					X		0			0						0		2	16
17	17	(Denmark) (17) Mikkel B. Jensen	-																					-	17
18	18	(Denmark) (18) Nicklas Porsing	-																					-	18
Placing	Draw	Rider	Total	1	2	3	4	5	6	7	8	9	10	11	12	13	14	15	16	17	18	19	20	Pts	Pos	21	22	23

e: retired or mechanical failure • m: exclusion for exceeding two minute time allowance • t: exclusion for touching the tapes • x: other exclusion • f: fell
ns: non-starter • nc: non-classify
Semi-finals: Heat 21: Riders placed 1st, 4th, 6th & 7th in the intermediate classification (after 20 heats)
Heat 22: Riders placed 2nd, 3rd, 5th & 8th in the intermediate classification (after 20 heats)
Big Final (heat 23): The first and second placed riders in each of the Semi-Finals

gate A – inside	gate B	gate C	gate D – outside

=== Heat after heat ===
1. (57,83) Lindbäck, Holder, Sayfutdinov, Hancock
2. (58,53) N.Pedersen, Crump, Andersen, Gollob
3. (59,50) Kasprzak, Harris, Lindgren, Hampel
4. (59,00) Ljung, B.Pedersen, Jensen, Jonsson (R)
5. (57,79) N.Pedersen, Jonsson, Holder, Hampel
6. (58,46) Hancock, Andersen, Jensen, Kasprzak
7. (58,44) Lindbäck, Lindgren, Gollob, B.Pedersen
8. (59,63) Sayfutdinov, Crump, Ljung, Harris (X)
9. (58,44) Holder, Ljung, Lindgren, Andersen
10. (59,12) N.Pedersen, Hancock, B.Pedersen, Harris
11. (59,11) Crump, Jensen, Lindbäck, Hampel
12. (59,47) Gollob, Sayfutdinov, Jonsson, Kasprzak (X)
13. (59,62) Jensen, Gollob, Holder, Harris
14. (58,84) Lindgren, Hancock, Jonsson, Crump (R)
15. (59,34) Lindbäck, N.Pedersen, Kasprzak, Ljung
16. (59,75) Sayfutdinov, B.Pedersen, Andersen, Hampel
17. (59,03) Holder, B.Pedersen, Crump, Kasprzak (R)
18. (59,37) Hampel, Hancock, Gollob, Ljung (R)
19. (59,53) Jonsson, Andersen, Lindbäck, Harris
20. (59,83) Lindgren, N.Pedersen, Sayfutdinov, Jensen
  Semifinals
21. (59,10) N.Pedersen, Crump, Lindgren, Hancock
22. (59,69) Sayfutdinov, Jensen, Holder, Lindbäck
  the Final
23. (59,64) Jensen, Pedersen, Sayfutdinov, Crump

== The intermediate classification ==
Qualifies for next season's Grand Prix series
Full-time Grand Prix rider
Wild card, track reserve or qualified reserve

Pos.	Rider	Points	NZL (New Zealand)	EUR (Poland)	CZE (Czech Republic)	SWE (Sweden)	DEN (Denmark)	POL (Poland)	CRO (Croatia)	ITA (Italy)	GBR (United Kingdom)	SCA (Sweden)	NOR (Denmark)	PL2 (Poland)
1	(Australia) (8) Chris Holder	145	4	19	12	17	9	17	6	10	23	17	11	
2	(Denmark) (10) Nicki Pedersen	143	13	10	19	14	9	7	19	10	11	11	20	
3	(United States) (1) Greg Hancock	135	22	9	12	15	17	12	10	14	7	8	9	
4	(Russia) (6) Emil Sayfutdinov	122	8	7	10	12	11	10	7	19	12	11	15	
5	(Australia) (4) Jason Crump	121	12	12	20	11	18	5	9	10	6	8	10	
6	(Poland) (5) Tomasz Gollob	121	15	16	12	6	3	12	13	6	10	21	7	
7	(Sweden) (9) Fredrik Lindgren	111	8	8	6	15	15	11	9	5	12	11	11	
8	(Sweden) (12) Antonio Lindbäck	103	13	4	9	5	3	6	6	16	12	18	11	
9	(Sweden) (2) Andreas Jonsson	84	4	13	3	10	8	9	15	8	6	1	7	
10	(Denmark) (15) Hans N. Andersen	64	6	5	6	3	4	7	8	4	10	5	6	
11	(United Kingdom) (11) Chris Harris	59	5	3	6	3	10	1	10	8	6	5	2	
12	(Denmark) (13) Bjarne Pedersen	56	7	2	6	4	10	4	5	3	2	6	7	
13	(Poland) (3) Jarosław Hampel	55	18	15	6	7	ns	–	–	–	–	6	3	
14	(Sweden) (14) Peter Ljung	55	4	6	5	6	8	7	0	8	0	5	6	
15	(Slovakia) (19) Martin Vaculík	55	–	–	–	–	–	20	8	14	7	6	–	
16	(Denmark) (7) Kenneth Bjerre	41	4	8	3	5	5	3	7	6	–	–	–	
17	(Denmark) (16) Michael Jepsen Jensen	22	–	–	–	–	7	–	–	–	–	–	15	
18	(Poland) (20) Krzysztof Kasprzak	17	–	–	–	–	–	–	–	–	13	–	4	
19	(Sweden) (16) Thomas H. Jonasson	16	–	–	–	11	–	–	–	–	–	5	–	
20	(Poland) (16) Bartosz Zmarzlik	13	–	–	–	–	–	13	–	–	–	–	–	
21	(Croatia) (16) Jurica Pavlic	12	–	–	–	–	–	–	12	–	–	–	–	
22	(Czech Republic) (16) Josef Franc	9	–	–	9	–	–	–	–	–	–	–	–	
23	(Poland) (16)(18) Przemysław Pawlicki	7	–	7	–	–	–	ns	–	–	–	–	–	
24	(United Kingdom) (16) Scott Nicholls	7	–	–	–	–	–	–	–	–	7	–	–	
25	(Denmark) (17)(18) Mikkel B. Jensen	4	–	–	–	–	4	–	–	–	–	–	ns	
26	(Italy) (16) Nicolas Covatti	3	–	–	–	–	–	–	–	3	–	–	–	
27	(Denmark) (17) Peter Kildemand	2	–	–	–	–	2	–	–	–	–	–	–	
28	(United Kingdom) (16) Jason Bunyan	1	1	–	–	–	–	–	–	–	–	–	–	
29	(Czech Republic) (17) Václav Milík, Jr.	0	–	–	0	–	–	–	–	–	–	–	–	
30	(Croatia) (17) Dino Kovacic	0	–	–	–	–	–	–	0	–	–	–	–	
31	(Sweden) (17)(18) Linus Sundström	0	–	–	–	ns	–	–	–	–	–	0	–	
32	(Sweden) (17) Kim Nilsson	0	–	–	–	–	–	–	–	–	–	0	–	
Rider(s) not classified
	(New Zealand) (17) Grant Tregoning	—	ns	–	–	–	–	–	–	–	–	–	–	
	(New Zealand) (18) Sean Mason	—	ns	–	–	–	–	–	–	–	–	–	–	
	(Poland) (17) Tobiasz Musielak	—	–	ns	–	–	–	–	–	–	–	–	–	
	(Poland) (17)(18) Piotr Pawlicki, Jr.	—	–	ns	–	–	–	ns	–	–	–	–	–	
	(Czech Republic) (18) Matěj Kůs	—	–	–	ns	–	–	–	–	–	–	–	–	
	(Sweden) (18) Simon Gustafsson	—	–	–	–	ns	–	–	–	–	–	–	–	
	(Slovenia) (18) Samo Kukovica	—	–	–	–	–	–	–	ns	–	–	–	–	
	(Italy) (17) Michele Paco Castagna	—	–	–	–	–	–	–	–	ns	–	–	–	
	(Italy) (18) Nicolas Vicentin	—	–	–	–	–	–	–	–	ns	–	–	–	
	(United Kingdom) (17) Ben Barker	—	–	–	–	–	–	–	–	–	ns	–	–	
	(United Kingdom) (18) Josh Auty	—	–	–	–	–	–	–	–	–	ns	–	–	
	(Denmark) (18) Nicklas Porsing	—	–	–	–	–	–	–	–	–	–	–	ns	
Pos.	Rider	Points	NZL (New Zealand)	EUR (Poland)	CZE (Czech Republic)	SWE (Sweden)	DEN (Denmark)	POL (Poland)	CRO (Croatia)	ITA (Italy)	GBR (United Kingdom)	SCA (Sweden)	NOR (Denmark)	PL2 (Poland)

== See also ==
- motorcycle speedway
