= 2012 Speedway Grand Prix of Poland =

- 2012 FIM Gorzow Speedway Grand Prix of Poland

Information
- Date: 23 June 2012
- City: (Poland) Gorzów Wielkopolski
- Event: 6 of 12 (150)
- Referee: (Sweden) Krister Gardell
- Jury President: (United Kingdom) Anthony Steele

Stadium details
- Stadium: Edward Jancarz Stadium
- Capacity: 17,000
- Length: 329 m (360 yd)
- Track: speedway

SGP Results
- Attendance: 10,000
- Best Time: (Slovakia) Martin Vaculík; 61,60 secs (in Heat 2)
- (gold) Winner: (Slovakia) Martin Vaculík
- (silver) Runner-up: (Australia) Chris Holder
- (bronze) 3rd place: (Poland) Bartosz Zmarzlik

The 2012 FIM Gorzow Speedway Grand Prix of Poland was the sixth race of the 2012 Speedway Grand Prix season. It took place on June 23 at the Edward Jancarz Stadium in Gorzów Wielkopolski, Poland.

The Grand Prix was won by Martin Vaculík who beat Chris Harris, wild card Bartosz Zmarzlik and Tomasz Gollob. Vaculík becoming first Slovak rider who ride in the SGP and third rider who won SGP event in his debut (after Tomasz Gollob and Emil Sayfutdinov). It was 150th SPG event since 1995 and Greg Hancock was only rider who rode in all meetings.

== Riders ==
The Speedway Grand Prix Commission nominated Bartosz Zmarzlik as Wild Card, and Piotr and Przemysław Pawlicki both as Track Reserves. Injured Jarosław Hampel was replaced by first Qualified Substitutes, Martin Vaculík. The draw was made on June 22.

(3) (Poland) Jarosław Hampel → (19) (Slovakia) Martin Vaculík

== Heat details ==
Placing	Draw	Rider	Total	1	2	3	4	5	6	7	8	9	10	11	12	13	14	15	16	17	18	19	20	Pts	Pos	21	22	23
1	5	(Slovakia) (19) Martin Vaculík	20		3			2					2					2					3	12	2		2	3
2	10	(Australia) (8) Chris Holder	17			2			2						1			3		3				11	4	2		2
3	7	(Poland) (16) Bartosz Zmarzlik	13		2					1					3	2					0			8	7	3		1
4	6	(Poland) (5) Tomasz Gollob	12		1				1			1							3			3		9	5		3	0
5	9	(United States) (1) Greg Hancock	12			1		3						3					2		3			12	1	R
6	2	(Sweden) (9) Fredrik Lindgren	11	2					3				3				1				2			11	3		0
7	11	(Russia) (6) Emil Sayfutdinov	10			0				2		2					3						2	9	6	1
8	13	(Sweden) (2) Andreas Jonsson	9				3	0							2		2					1		8	8		1
9	1	(Sweden) (14) Peter Ljung	7	3				1				0				3				0				7	9
10	15	(Denmark) (10) Nicki Pedersen	7				2			3			1						0	1				7	10
11	16	(Denmark) (15) Hans N. Andersen	7				0				2	3						1			1			7	11
12	4	(Sweden) (12) Antonio Lindbäck	6	1							3				0				1				1	6	12
13	12	(Australia) (4) Jason Crump	5			3					X		0			0						2		5	13
14	14	(Denmark) (13) Bjarne Pedersen	4				1		0					2		1							0	4	14
15	8	(Denmark) (7) Kenneth Bjerre	3		0						1			0			0			2				3	15
16	3	(United Kingdom) (11) Chris Harris	1	0						R				1				R				0		1	16
17	17	(Poland) (17) Piotr Pawlicki, Jr.	-																					-	17
18	18	(Poland) (18) Przemysław Pawlicki	-																					-	18
Placing	Draw	Rider	Total	1	2	3	4	5	6	7	8	9	10	11	12	13	14	15	16	17	18	19	20	Pts	Pos	21	22	23

e: retired or mechanical failure • m: exclusion for exceeding two minute time allowance • t: exclusion for touching the tapes • x: other exclusion • f: fell
ns: non-starter • nc: non-classify
Semi-finals: Heat 21: Riders placed 1st, 4th, 6th & 7th in the intermediate classification (after 20 heats)
Heat 22: Riders placed 2nd, 3rd, 5th & 8th in the intermediate classification (after 20 heats)
Big Final (heat 23): The first and second placed riders in each of the Semi-Finals

gate A – inside	gate B	gate C	gate D – outside

=== Heat after heat ===
1. (61,81) Ljung, Lindgren, Lindbäck, Harris
2. (61,60) Vaculík, Zmarzlik, Gollob, Bjerre
3. (62,31) Crump, Holder, Hancock, Sayfutdinov
4. (62,41) Jonsson, N. Pedersen, B. Pedersen, Andersen
5. (62,75) Hancock, Vaculík, Ljung, Jonsson
6. (63,01) Lindgren, Holder, Gollob, B. Pedersen
7. (63,14) N. Pedersen, Sayfutdinov, Zmarzlik, Harris (R)
8. (63,11) Lindbäck, Andersen, Bjerre, Crump (X)
9. (63,33) Andersen, Sayfutdinov, Gollob, Ljung
10. (63,94) Lindgren, Vaculík, N. Pedersen, Crump
11. (63,97) Hancock, B. Pedersen, Harris, Bjerre
12. (64,13) Zmarzlik, Jonsson, Holder, Lindbäck
13. (64,19) Ljung, Zmarzlik, B. Pedersen, Crump
14. (63,78) Sayfutdinov, Jonsson, Lindgren, Bjerre
15. (64,34) Holder, Vaculík, Andersen, Harris (R)
16. (64,12) Gollob, Hancock, Lindbäck, N. Pedersen
17. (65,06) Holder, Bjerre, N. Pedersen, Ljung
18. (64,72) Hancock, Lindgren, Andersen, Zmarzlik
19. (64,34) Gollob, Crump, Jonsson, Harris
20. (64,22) Vaculík, Sayfutdinov, Lindbäck, B. Pedersen
  Semifinals
21. (64,23) Zmarzlik, Holder, Sayfutdinov, Hancock (R)
22. (64,34) Gollob, Vaculík, Jonsson, Lindgren
  Final
23. (66,87) Vaculík, Holder, Zmarzlik, Gollob

== The intermediate classification ==
Qualifies for next season's Grand Prix series
Full-time Grand Prix rider
Wild card, track reserve or qualified reserve

Pos.	Rider	Points	NZL (New Zealand)	EUR (Poland)	CZE (Czech Republic)	SWE (Sweden)	DEN (Denmark)	POL (Poland)	CRO (Croatia)	ITA (Italy)	GBR (United Kingdom)	SCA (Sweden)	NOR (Denmark)	PL2 (Poland)
1	(United States) (1) Greg Hancock	87	22	9	12	15	17	12						
2	(Australia) (4) Jason Crump	78	12	12	20	11	18	5						
3	(Australia) (8) Chris Holder	78	4	19	12	17	9	17						
4	(Denmark) (10) Nicki Pedersen	72	13	10	19	14	9	7						
5	(Poland) (5) Tomasz Gollob	64	15	16	12	6	3	12						
6	(Sweden) (9) Fredrik Lindgren	63	8	8	6	15	15	11						
7	(Russia) (6) Emil Sayfutdinov	58	8	7	10	12	11	10						
8	(Sweden) (2) Andreas Jonsson	47	4	13	3	10	8	9						
9	(Poland) (3) Jarosław Hampel	46	18	15	6	7	ns	–						
10	(Sweden) (12) Antonio Lindbäck	40	13	4	9	5	3	6						
11	(Sweden) (14) Peter Ljung	36	4	6	5	6	8	7						
12	(Denmark) (13) Bjarne Pedersen	33	7	2	6	4	10	4						
13	(Denmark) (15) Hans N. Andersen	31	6	5	6	3	4	7						
14	(Denmark) (7) Kenneth Bjerre	28	4	8	3	5	5	3						
15	(United Kingdom) (11) Chris Harris	28	5	3	6	3	10	1						
16	(Slovakia) (19) Martin Vaculík	20	–	–	–	–	–	20						
17	(Poland) (16) Bartosz Zmarzlik	13	–	–	–	–	–	13						
18	(Sweden) (16) Thomas H. Jonasson	11	–	–	–	11	–	–						
19	(Czech Republic) (16) Josef Franc	9	–	–	9	–	–	–						
20	(Poland) (16)(18) Przemysław Pawlicki	7	–	7	–	–	–	ns						
21	(Denmark) (16) Michael Jepsen Jensen	7	–	–	–	–	7	–						
22	(Denmark) (18) Mikkel B. Jensen	4	–	–	–	–	4	–						
23	(Denmark) (17) Peter Kildemand	2	–	–	–	–	2	–						
24	(United Kingdom) (16) Jason Bunyan	1	1	–	–	–	–	–						
25	(Czech Republic) (17) Václav Milík, Jr.	0	–	–	0	–	–	–						
Rider(s) not classified
	(New Zealand) (17) Grant Tregoning	—	ns	–	–	–	–	–						
	(New Zealand) (18) Sean Mason	—	ns	–	–	–	–	–						
	(Poland) (17) Tobiasz Musielak	—	–	ns	–	–	–	–						
	(Poland) (17)(18) Piotr Pawlicki, Jr.	—	–	ns	–	–	–	ns						
	(Czech Republic) (18) Matěj Kůs	—	–	–	ns	–	–	–						
	(Sweden) (17) Linus Sundström	—	–	–	–	ns	–	–						
	(Sweden) (18) Simon Gustafsson	—	–	–	–	ns	–	–						
Pos.	Rider	Points	NZL (New Zealand)	EUR (Poland)	CZE (Czech Republic)	SWE (Sweden)	DEN (Denmark)	POL (Poland)	CRO (Croatia)	ITA (Italy)	GBR (United Kingdom)	SCA (Sweden)	NOR (Denmark)	PL2 (Poland)

== See also ==
- motorcycle speedway
