= 2012 Speedway Grand Prix of Sweden =

- 2012 FIM Swedish SGP

Information
- Date: 26 May 2012
- City: (Sweden) Gothenburg
- Event: 4 of 12 (148)
- Referee: (United Kingdom) Craig Ackroyd
- Jury President: (Italy) Armando Castagna

Stadium details
- Stadium: Ullevi
- Capacity: 43,000
- Length: 404 m (442 yd)
- Track: temporary (athletics)

SGP Results
- Attendance: 11,000
- Best Time: (Sweden) Antonio Lindbäck; 67,1 secs (in Heat 2)
- (gold) Winner: (Sweden) Fredrik Lindgren
- (silver) Runner-up: (United States) Greg Hancock
- (bronze) 3rd place: (Australia) Chris Holder

The 2012 FIM Swedish Speedway Grand Prix was the fourth race of the 2012 Speedway Grand Prix season. It took place on May 26 at the Ullevi stadium in Gothenburg, Sweden.

The Grand Prix was won by Fredrik Lindgren who beat Greg Hancock, Chris Holder and wild card Thomas H. Jonasson. It was the first SGP won by Lidngren.

== Riders ==
The Speedway Grand Prix Commission nominated Thomas H. Jonasson as Wild Card, and Linus Sundström and Simon Gustafsson both as Track Reserves. The Draw was made on May 25.

== Heat details ==
Placing	Draw	Rider	Total	1	2	3	4	5	6	7	8	9	10	11	12	13	14	15	16	17	18	19	20	Pts	Pos	21	22	23
1	6	(Sweden) (9) Fredrik Lindgren	15		1				1			3							0			2		7	8		2	3
2	12	(United States) (1) Greg Hancock	15			0					1		3			1						3		8	7	3		2
3	16	(Australia) (8) Chris Holder	17				2				2	2						3			3			12	2		3	1
4	2	(Sweden) (16) Thomas H. Jonasson	11	2					2				2				2				1			9	6	2		0
5	4	(Denmark) (10) Nicki Pedersen	14	3							3				3				3				2	14	1	X
6	10	(Russia) (6) Emil Sayfutdinov	12			3			3						2			1		2				11	3		1
7	14	(Australia) (4) Jason Crump	11				3		0					2		2							3	10	4	1
8	11	(Sweden) (2) Andreas Jonsson	10			2				3		1					3						1	10	5		0
9	5	(Poland) (3) Jarosław Hampel	7		2			2					1					2					0	7	9
10	3	(Sweden) (14) Peter Ljung	6	1						2				3				0				0		6	10
11	7	(Poland) (5) Tomasz Gollob	6		0					F					1	3					2			6	11
12	8	(Sweden) (12) Antonio Lindbäck	6		3						0			1			1			1				6	12
13	9	(Denmark) (7) Kenneth Bjerre	5			1		3						0					1		0			5	13
14	15	(Denmark) (13) Bjarne Pedersen	4				1			1			0						2	0				4	14
15	1	(United Kingdom) (11) Chris Harris	3	0				0				R				0				3				3	15
16	13	(Denmark) (15) Hans N. Andersen	2				0	1							0		0					1		2	16
17	17	(Sweden) (17) Linus Sundström	-																					-	17
18	18	(Sweden) (18) Simon Gustafsson	-																					-	18
Placing	Draw	Rider	Total	1	2	3	4	5	6	7	8	9	10	11	12	13	14	15	16	17	18	19	20	Pts	Pos	21	22	23

e: retired or mechanical failure • m: exclusion for exceeding two minute time allowance • t: exclusion for touching the tapes • x: other exclusion • f: fell
ns: non-starter • nc: non-classify
Semi-finals: Heat 21: Riders placed 1st, 4th, 6th & 7th in the intermediate classification (after 20 heats)
Heat 22: Riders placed 2nd, 3rd, 5th & 8th in the intermediate classification (after 20 heats)
Big Final (heat 23): The first and second placed riders in each of the Semi-Finals

gate A – inside	gate B	gate C	gate D – outside

=== Heat after heat ===
1. (67,2) N. Pedersen, Jonasson, Ljung, Harris
2. (67,1) Lindbäck, Hampel, Lindgren, Gollob
3. (67,3) Sayfutdinov, Jonsson, Bjerre, Hancock
4. (67,4) Crump, Holder, B. Pedersen, Andersen
5. (68,2) Bjerre, Hampel, Andersen, Harris
6. (68,5) Sayfutdinov, Jonasson, Lindgren, Crump
7. (68,7) Jonsson, Ljung, B. Pedersen, Gollob (F)
8. (67,4) N. Pedersen, Holder, Hancock, Lindbäck
9. (68,3) Lindgren, Holder, Jonsson, Harris (R)
10. (68,9) Hancock, Jonasson, Hampel, B. Pedersen
11. (69,7) Ljung, Crump, Lindbäck, Bjerre
12. (68,3) N. Pedersen, Sayfutdinov, Gollob, Andersen
13. (69,2) Gollob, Crump, Hancock, Harris
14. (69,2) Jonsson, Jonasson, Andersen, Lindbäck
15. (68,6) Holder, Hampel, Sayfutdinov, Ljung
16. (69,1) N. Pedersen, B. Pedersen, Bjerre, Lindgren
17. (69,0) Harris, Sayfutdinov, Lindbäck, B. Pedersen
18. (67,7) Holder, Gollob, Jonasson, Bjerre
19. (68,8) Hancock, Lindgren, Andersen, Ljung
20. (68,3) Crump, N. Pedersen, Jonsson, Hampel
  Semifinals
21. (69,4)21. Hancock, Jonasson, Crump, N. Pedersen (X)
22. (69,1)22. Holder, Lindgren, Sayfutdinov, Jonsson
  the Final
23. (69,1)23. Lindgren, Hancock, Holder, Jonasson

== The intermediate classification ==
Qualifies for next season's Grand Prix series
Full-time Grand Prix rider
Wild card, track reserve or qualified reserve

Pos.	Rider	Points	NZL (New Zealand)	EUR (Poland)	CZE (Czech Republic)	SWE (Sweden)	DEN (Denmark)	POL (Poland)	CRO (Croatia)	ITA (Italy)	GBR (United Kingdom)	SCA (Sweden)	NOR (Denmark)	PL2 (Poland)
1	(United States) (1) Greg Hancock	58	22	9	12	15								
2	(Denmark) (10) Nicki Pedersen	56	13	10	19	14								
3	(Australia) (4) Jason Crump	55	12	12	20	11								
4	(Australia) (8) Chris Holder	52	4	19	12	17								
5	(Poland) (5) Tomasz Gollob	49	15	16	12	6								
6	(Poland) (3) Jarosław Hampel	46	18	15	6	7								
7	(Russia) (6) Emil Sayfutdinov	37	8	7	10	12								
8	(Sweden) (9) Fredrik Lindgren	37	8	8	6	15								
9	(Sweden) (12) Antonio Lindbäck	31	13	4	9	5								
10	(Sweden) (2) Andreas Jonsson	30	4	13	3	10								
11	(Sweden) (14) Peter Ljung	21	4	6	5	6								
12	(Denmark) (7) Kenneth Bjerre	20	4	8	3	5								
13	(Denmark) (15) Hans N. Andersen	20	6	5	6	3								
14	(Denmark) (13) Bjarne Pedersen	19	7	2	6	4								
15	(United Kingdom) (11) Chris Harris	17	5	3	6	3								
16	(Sweden) (16) Thomas H. Jonasson	11	–	–	–	11								
17	(Czech Republic) (16) Josef Franc	9	–	–	9	–								
18	(Poland) (16) Przemysław Pawlicki	7	–	7	–	–								
19	(United Kingdom) (16) Jason Bunyan	1	1	–	–	–								
20	(Czech Republic) (17) Václav Milík, Jr.	0	–	–	0	–								
Rider(s) not classified
	(New Zealand) (17) Grant Tregoning	—	ns	–	–	–								
	(New Zealand) (18) Sean Mason	—	ns	–	–	–								
	(Poland) (17) Tobiasz Musielak	—	–	ns	–	–								
	(Poland) (18) Piotr Pawlicki, Jr.	—	–	ns	–	–								
	(Czech Republic) (18) Matěj Kůs	—	–	–	ns	–								
	(Sweden) (17) Linus Sundström	—	–	–	–	ns								
	(Sweden) (18) Simon Gustafsson	—	–	–	–	ns								
Pos.	Rider	Points	NZL (New Zealand)	EUR (Poland)	CZE (Czech Republic)	SWE (Sweden)	DEN (Denmark)	POL (Poland)	CRO (Croatia)	ITA (Italy)	GBR (United Kingdom)	SCA (Sweden)	NOR (Denmark)	PL2 (Poland)

== See also ==
- motorcycle speedway
