= 2012 Speedway Grand Prix of Denmark =

- 2012 FIM Dansk Metal Danish SGP

Information
- Date: 9 June 2012
- City: (Denmark) Copenhagen
- Event: 5 of 12 (149)
- Referee: (Poland) Wojciech Grodzki
- Jury President: (Finland) Ilkka Teromaa

Stadium details
- Stadium: Parken Stadium
- Capacity: 28,000
- Length: 275 m (301 yd)
- Track: temporary (football/soccer)

SGP Results
- Attendance: 16,500
- Best Time: (Denmark) Nicki Pedersen; 55,3 secs (in Heat 5)
- (gold) Winner: (Australia) Jason Crump
- (silver) Runner-up: (Sweden) Fredrik Lindgren
- (bronze) 3rd place: (United States) Greg Hancock

The 2012 FIM Dansk Metal Danish Speedway Grand Prix was the fifth race of the 2012 Speedway Grand Prix season. It took place on 9 June at the Parken Stadium in Copenhagen, Denmark.

The Grand Prix was won by Jason Crump who beat Fredrik Lindgren, Greg Hancock and Chris Harris. Jarosław Hampel was injured in Heat 1 (right leg' fibula broken) and was out for next four SGP events and World Cup also.

== Riders ==
The Speedway Grand Prix Commission nominated Michael Jepsen Jensen as Wild Card, and Peter Kildemand and Mikkel B. Jensen both as Track Reserves. The Draw was made on 8 June.

== Results ==
=== Heat details ===
Placing	Draw	Rider	Total	1	2	3	4	5	6	7	8	9	10	11	12	13	14	15	16	17	18	19	20	Pts	Pos	21	22	23
1	9	(Australia) (4) Jason Crump	18			2		0						1					3		3			9	3		3	3
2	5	(Sweden) (9) Fredrik Lindgren	15		2			1					1					3					2	9	7	2		2
3	7	(United States) (1) Greg Hancock	17		3					2					2	3					2			12	1	3		1
4	11	(United Kingdom) (11) Chris Harris	10			1				3		2					2						0	8	8		2	0
5	8	(Russia) (6) Emil Sayfutdinov	11		1						3			3			3			1				11	2		X
6	12	(Denmark) (13) Bjarne Pedersen	10			0					1		3			2						3		9	5		1
7	13	(Denmark) (10) Nicki Pedersen	9				3	3							0		1					2		9	4	X
8	1	(Australia) (8) Chris Holder	9	3				2				1				X				3				9	6	X
9	16	(Sweden) (2) Andreas Jonsson	8				R				2	3						2			1			8	9
10	10	(Sweden) (14) Peter Ljung	8			3			1						1			1		2				8	10
11	14	(Denmark) (16) Michael Jepsen Jensen	7				1		2					0		1							3	7	11
12	3	(Denmark) (7) Kenneth Bjerre	5	1						1				2				R				1		5	12
13	18	(Denmark) (18) Mikkel B. Jensen	4	0											3								1	4	13
14	2	(Denmark) (15) Hans N. Andersen	4	2					0				2				0				0			4	14
15	6	(Poland) (5) Tomasz Gollob	3		0				3			0							0			0		3	15
16	15	(Sweden) (12) Antonio Lindbäck	3				2			0			0						1	0				3	16
17	17	(Denmark) (17) Peter Kildemand	2	T/-							0								2					2	17
18	4	(Poland) (3) Jarosław Hampel	0	F/-							-				-				-				-	0	18
Placing	Draw	Rider	Total	1	2	3	4	5	6	7	8	9	10	11	12	13	14	15	16	17	18	19	20	Pts	Pos	21	22	23

e: retired or mechanical failure • m: exclusion for exceeding two minute time allowance • t: exclusion for touching the tapes • x: other exclusion • f: fell
ns: non-starter • nc: non-classify
Semi-finals: Heat 21: Riders placed 1st, 4th, 6th & 7th in the intermediate classification (after 20 heats)
Heat 22: Riders placed 2nd, 3rd, 5th & 8th in the intermediate classification (after 20 heats)
Big Final (heat 23): The first and second placed riders in each of the Semi-Finals

gate A – inside	gate B	gate C	gate D – outside

=== Heat after heat ===
1. (56,9) Holder, Andersen, Bjerre, MB Jensen (Kildemand T/-), (Hampel F/-)
2. (55,9) Hancock, Lindgren, Sayfutdinov, Gollob
3. (57,0) Ljung, Crump, Harris, B. Pedersen
4. (55,8) N. Pedersen, Lindbäck, MJ Jensen, Jonsson (R)
5. (55,3) N. Pedersen, Holder, Lindgren, Crump
6. (57,8) Gollob, MJ Jensen, Ljung, Andersen
7. (56,5) Harris, Hancock, Bjerre, Lindbäck
8. (56,2) Sayfutdinov, Jonsson, B. Pedersen, Kildemand
9. (55,4) Jonsson, Harris, Holder, Gollob
10. (57,9) B. Pedersen, Andersen, Lindgren, Lindbäck
11. (58,2) Sayfutdinov, Bjerre, Crump, MJ Jensen
12. (57,8) MB Jensen, Hancock, Ljung, N. Pedersen
13. (56,9) Hancock, B. Pedersen, MJ Jensen, Holder (X)
14. (57,5) Sayfutdinov, Harris, N. Pedersen, Andersen
15. (55,9) Lindgren, Jonsson, Ljung, Bjerre (R)
16. (57,2) Crump, Kildemand, Lindbäck, Gollob
17. (57,9) Holder, Ljung, Sayfutdinov, Lindbäck
18. (57,6) Crump, Hancock, Jonsson, Andersen
19. (56,8) B. Pedersen, N. Pedersen, Bjerre, Gollob
20. (57,5) MJ Jensen, Lindgren, MB Jensen, Harris
  Semifinals
21. (57,9) Hancock, Lindgren, N. Pedersen (X), Holder (X)
22. (57,3) Crump, Harris, B. Pedersen, Sayfutdinov (X)
  the Final
23. (56,9) Crump, Lindgren, Hancock, Harris

== The intermediate classification ==
Qualifies for next season's Grand Prix series
Full-time Grand Prix rider
Wild card, track reserve or qualified reserve

Pos.	Rider	Points	NZL (New Zealand)	EUR (Poland)	CZE (Czech Republic)	SWE (Sweden)	DEN (Denmark)	POL (Poland)	CRO (Croatia)	ITA (Italy)	GBR (United Kingdom)	SCA (Sweden)	NOR (Denmark)	PL2 (Poland)
1	(United States) (1) Greg Hancock	75	22	9	12	15	17							
2	(Australia) (4) Jason Crump	73	12	12	20	11	18							
3	(Denmark) (10) Nicki Pedersen	65	13	10	19	14	9							
4	(Australia) (8) Chris Holder	61	4	19	12	17	9							
5	(Poland) (5) Tomasz Gollob	52	15	16	12	6	3							
6	(Sweden) (9) Fredrik Lindgren	52	8	8	6	15	15							
7	(Russia) (6) Emil Sayfutdinov	48	8	7	10	12	11							
8	(Poland) (3) Jarosław Hampel	46	18	15	6	7	ns							
9	(Sweden) (2) Andreas Jonsson	38	4	13	3	10	8							
10	(Sweden) (12) Antonio Lindbäck	34	13	4	9	5	3							
11	(Denmark) (13) Bjarne Pedersen	29	7	2	6	4	10							
12	(Sweden) (14) Peter Ljung	29	4	6	5	6	8							
13	(United Kingdom) (11) Chris Harris	27	5	3	6	3	10							
14	(Denmark) (7) Kenneth Bjerre	25	4	8	3	5	5							
15	(Denmark) (15) Hans N. Andersen	24	6	5	6	3	4							
16	(Sweden) (16) Thomas H. Jonasson	11	–	–	–	11	–							
17	(Czech Republic) (16) Josef Franc	9	–	–	9	–	–							
18	(Poland) (16) Przemysław Pawlicki	7	–	7	–	–	–							
19	(Denmark) (16) Michael Jepsen Jensen	7	–	–	–	–	7							
20	(Denmark) (18) Mikkel B. Jensen	4	–	–	–	–	4							
21	(Denmark) (17) Peter Kildemand	2	–	–	–	–	2							
22	(United Kingdom) (16) Jason Bunyan	1	1	–	–	–	–							
23	(Czech Republic) (17) Václav Milík, Jr.	0	–	–	0	–	–							
Rider(s) not classified
	(New Zealand) (17) Grant Tregoning	—	ns	–	–	–	–							
	(New Zealand) (18) Sean Mason	—	ns	–	–	–	–							
	(Poland) (17) Tobiasz Musielak	—	–	ns	–	–	–							
	(Poland) (18) Piotr Pawlicki, Jr.	—	–	ns	–	–	–							
	(Czech Republic) (18) Matěj Kůs	—	–	–	ns	–	–							
	(Sweden) (17) Linus Sundström	—	–	–	–	ns	–							
	(Sweden) (18) Simon Gustafsson	—	–	–	–	ns	–							
Pos.	Rider	Points	NZL (New Zealand)	EUR (Poland)	CZE (Czech Republic)	SWE (Sweden)	DEN (Denmark)	POL (Poland)	CRO (Croatia)	ITA (Italy)	GBR (United Kingdom)	SCA (Sweden)	NOR (Denmark)	PL2 (Poland)

== See also ==
- motorcycle speedway
