= 2012 Speedway Grand Prix =

18th season of the Speedway Grand Prix

Season details
- Dates: March 31 — October 6
- Events: 12
- Cities: 12
- Countries: 8
- Riders: 15 permanents 1 wild card(s); 2 track reserves
- Heats: 276 (in 12 events)

Winners
- Champion: AUS Chris Holder
- Runner-up: DEN Nicki Pedersen
- 3rd place: USA Greg Hancock

The 2012 Speedway Grand Prix season was the 67th edition of the official World Championship and the 18th season of the Speedway Grand Prix era, deciding the FIM Speedway World Championship. It was the twelfth series under the promotion of Benfield Sports International, an IMG company. The series began on 31 March in Auckland and finish on 6 October in Toruń.

The Australian rider Chris Holder became World Champion, making him the youngest gold medalist since the start of the Speedway Grand Prix series in 1995. Nicki Pedersen returned to the World Championship podium finishing second, while the American veteran Greg Hancock won the bronze medal.

== Qualification ==
For the 2012 season there will be 15 permanent riders, joined at each Grand Prix by one wild card and two track reserves.

=== 2011 Grand Prix ===
The top eight riders from the 2011 championship qualified as of right:

- (United States) (1) Greg Hancock
- (Sweden) (2) Andreas Jonsson
- (Poland) (3) Jarosław Hampel
- (Australia) (4) Jason Crump
- (Poland) (5) Tomasz Gollob
- (Russia) (6) Emil Sayfutdinov
- (Denmark) (7) Kenneth Bjerre
- (Australia) (8) Chris Holder

=== Grand Prix Challenge ===
The top eight riders from the 2011 championship were joined by three riders who qualified via the Grand Prix Challenge.

- (Sweden) (12) Antonio Lindbäck
- (Denmark) (13) Bjarne Pedersen
- (Sweden) (14) Peter Ljung

=== Nominations ===
The final four riders were nominated by series promoters, Benfield Sports International, following the completion of the 2011 season.

- (Sweden) (9) Fredrik Lindgren
- (Denmark) (10) Nicki Pedersen
- (United Kingdom) (11) Chris Harris
- (Denmark) (15) Hans Andersen

=== Qualified Substitutes ===
- (Slovakia) (19) Martin Vaculík
- (Poland) (20) Krzysztof Kasprzak
- (Denmark) (21) Leon Madsen
- (Poland) (22) Sebastian Ułamek
- (Poland) (23) Krzysztof Buczkowski
- (Finland) (24) Joonas Kylmäkorpi

== Calendar ==
Round	Date	City and venue	Winner	Runner-up	3rd placed	4th placed	Results
1	March 31	(New Zealand) Auckland , New Zealand; Western Springs Stadium	(United States) Greg Hancock	(Poland) Jarosław Hampel	(Denmark) Nicki Pedersen	(Australia) Jason Crump	results
2	April 28	Leszno , Poland; Smoczyk Stadium	(Australia) Chris Holder	(Poland) Tomasz Gollob	(Poland) Jarosław Hampel	(Sweden) Andreas Jonsson	results
3	May 12	(Czech Republic) Prague , Czech Republic; Markéta Stadium	(Denmark) Nicki Pedersen	(Australia) Jason Crump	(Poland) Tomasz Gollob	(United States) Greg Hancock	results
4	May 26	(Sweden) Gothenburg , Sweden; Ullevi	(Sweden) Fredrik Lindgren	(United States) Greg Hancock	(Australia) Chris Holder	(Sweden) Thomas H. Jonasson	results
5	June 9	(Denmark) Copenhagen , Denmark; Parken Stadium	(Australia) Jason Crump	(Sweden) Fredrik Lindgren	(United States) Greg Hancock	(United Kingdom) Chris Harris	results
6	June 23	(Poland) Gorzów Wlkp. , Poland; Jancarz Stadium	(Slovakia) Martin Vaculík	(Australia) Chris Holder	(Poland) Bartosz Zmarzlik	(Poland) Tomasz Gollob	results
7	July 28	(Croatia) Donji Kraljevec , Croatia; Stadium Milenium	(Denmark) Nicki Pedersen	(Sweden) Andreas Jonsson	(Poland) Tomasz Gollob	(Croatia) Jurica Pavlic	results
8	August 11	(Italy) Terenzano , Italy; Pista Olimpia Terenzano	(Sweden) Antonio Lindbäck	(Russia) Emil Sayfutdinov	(United States) Greg Hancock	(Slovakia) Martin Vaculík	results
9	August 25	(United Kingdom) Cardiff , Great Britain; Millennium Stadium	(Australia) Chris Holder	(Poland) Krzysztof Kasprzak	(Sweden) Antonio Lindbäck	(Sweden) Fredrik Lindgren	results
10	September 8	Målilla , Sweden; G&B Stadium	(Poland) Tomasz Gollob	(Australia) Chris Holder	(Sweden) Antonio Lindbäck	(Denmark) Nicki Pedersen	results
11	September 22	(Denmark) Vojens , Denmark; Speedway Center	(Denmark) Michael Jepsen Jensen	(Denmark) Nicki Pedersen	(Russia) Emil Sayfutdinov	(Australia) Jason Crump	results
12	October 6	Toruń , Poland; MotoArena Toruń	(Sweden) Antonio Lindbäck	(Poland) Tomasz Gollob	(United States) Greg Hancock	(Australia) Chris Holder	results

== Classification ==
Qualifies for next season's Grand Prix series
Full-time Grand Prix rider
Wild card, track reserve or qualified reserve

Pos.	Rider	Points	NZL (New Zealand)	EUR (Poland)	CZE (Czech Republic)	SWE (Sweden)	DEN (Denmark)	POL (Poland)	CRO (Croatia)	ITA (Italy)	GBR (United Kingdom)	SCA (Sweden)	NOR (Denmark)	PL2 (Poland)
Gold	(Australia) (8) Chris Holder	160	4	19	12	17	9	17	6	10	23	17	11	15
Silver	(Denmark) (10) Nicki Pedersen	152	13	10	19	14	9	7	19	10	11	11	20	9
Bronze	(United States) (1) Greg Hancock	148	22	9	12	15	17	12	10	14	7	8	9	13
4	(Poland) (5) Tomasz Gollob	142	15	16	12	6	3	12	13	6	10	21	7	21
5	(Russia) (6) Emil Sayfutdinov	133	8	7	10	12	11	10	7	19	12	11	15	11
6	(Australia) (4) Jason Crump	126	12	12	20	11	18	5	9	10	6	8	10	5
7	(Sweden) (12) Antonio Lindbäck	122	13	4	9	5	3	6	6	16	12	18	11	19
8	(Sweden) (9) Fredrik Lindgren	119	8	8	6	15	15	11	9	5	12	11	11	8
9	(Sweden) (2) Andreas Jonsson	88	4	13	3	10	8	9	15	8	6	1	7	4
10	(Denmark) (15) Hans N. Andersen	69	6	5	6	3	4	7	8	4	10	5	6	5
11	(Slovakia) (19) Martin Vaculík	67	–	–	–	–	–	20	8	14	7	6	–	12
12	(United Kingdom) (11) Chris Harris	65	5	3	6	3	10	1	10	8	6	5	2	6
13	(Denmark) (13) Bjarne Pedersen	59	7	2	6	4	10	4	5	3	2	6	7	3
14	(Poland) (3) Jarosław Hampel	58	18	15	6	7	0	–	–	–	–	6	3	3
15	(Sweden) (14) Peter Ljung	57	4	6	5	6	8	7	0	8	0	5	6	2
16	(Denmark) (7) Kenneth Bjerre	41	4	8	3	5	5	3	7	6	–	–	–	–
17	(Denmark) (16) Michael Jepsen Jensen	22	–	–	–	–	7	–	–	–	–	–	15	–
18	(Poland) (20) Krzysztof Kasprzak	17	–	–	–	–	–	–	–	–	13	–	4	–
19	(Sweden) (16) Thomas H. Jonasson	16	–	–	–	11	–	–	–	–	–	5	–	–
20	(Poland) (16) Bartosz Zmarzlik	13	–	–	–	–	–	13	–	–	–	–	–	–
21	(Croatia) (16) Jurica Pavlic	12	–	–	–	–	–	–	12	–	–	–	–	–
22	(Czech Republic) (16) Josef Franc	9	–	–	9	–	–	–	–	–	–	–	–	–
23	(Poland) (16) Maciej Janowski	8	–	–	–	–	–	–	–	–	–	–	–	8
24	(United Kingdom) (16) Scott Nicholls	7	–	–	–	–	–	–	–	–	7	–	–	–
25	(Poland) (16)(18) Przemysław Pawlicki	7	–	7	–	–	–	ns	–	–	–	–	–	–
26	(Denmark) (17)(18) Mikkel B. Jensen	4	–	–	–	–	4	–	–	–	–	–	ns	–
27	(Italy) (16) Nicolas Covatti	3	–	–	–	–	–	–	–	3	–	–	–	–
28	(Denmark) (17) Peter Kildemand	2	–	–	–	–	2	–	–	–	–	–	–	–
29	(United Kingdom) (16) Jason Bunyan	1	1	–	–	–	–	–	–	–	–	–	–	–
30	(Czech Republic) (17) Václav Milík, Jr.	0	–	–	0	–	–	–	–	–	–	–	–	–
31	(Croatia) (17) Dino Kovacic	0	–	–	–	–	–	–	0	–	–	–	–	–
32	(Sweden) (17) Kim Nilsson	0	–	–	–	–	–	–	–	–	–	0	–	–
33	(Sweden) (17)(18) Linus Sundström	0	–	–	–	ns	–	–	–	–	–	0	–	–
Rider(s) not classified
	(New Zealand) (17) Grant Tregoning	—	ns	–	–	–	–	–	–	–	–	–	–	–
	(New Zealand) (18) Sean Mason	—	ns	–	–	–	–	–	–	–	–	–	–	–
	(Poland) (17) Tobiasz Musielak	—	–	ns	–	–	–	–	–	–	–	–	–	–
	(Poland) (18) Piotr Pawlicki, Jr.	—	–	ns	–	–	–	–	–	–	–	–	–	–
	(Czech Republic) (18) Matěj Kůs	—	–	–	ns	–	–	–	–	–	–	–	–	–
	(Sweden) (18) Simon Gustafsson	—	–	–	–	ns	–	–	–	–	–	–	–	–
	(Croatia) (18) Samo Kukovica	—	–	–	–	–	–	–	ns	–	–	–	–	–
	(Italy) (17) Michele Paco Castagna	—	–	–	–	–	–	–	–	ns	–	–	–	–
	(Italy) (18) Nicolas Vicentin	—	–	–	–	–	–	–	–	ns	–	–	–	–
	(United Kingdom) (17) Ben Barker	—	–	–	–	–	–	–	–	–	ns	–	–	–
	(United Kingdom) (18) Josh Auty	—	–	–	–	–	–	–	–	–	ns	–	–	–
	(Denmark) (18) Nicklas Porsing	—	–	–	–	–	–	–	–	–	–	–	ns	–
	(Poland) (17) Emil Pulczynski	—	–	–	–	–	–	–	–	–	–	–	–	ns
	(Poland) (18) Kamil Pulczynski	—	–	–	–	–	–	–	–	–	–	–	–	ns
Pos.	Rider	Points	NZL (New Zealand)	EUR (Poland)	CZE (Czech Republic)	SWE (Sweden)	DEN (Denmark)	POL (Poland)	CRO (Croatia)	ITA (Italy)	GBR (United Kingdom)	SCA (Sweden)	NOR (Denmark)	PL2 (Poland)

== See also ==
- 2012 Individual Speedway Junior World Championship
