= 2012 Speedway Grand Prix of Europe =

Speedway competition

(Poland) 2012 Speedway Grand Prix of Europe
- 2012 FIM Fogo European SGP

Information
- Date: 28 April 2012
- City: (Poland) Leszno
- Event: 2 of 12 (146)
- Referee: (United Kingdom) Jim Lawrence
- Jury President: (Finland) Ilkka Teromaa

Stadium details
- Stadium: Alfred Smoczyk Stadium
- Capacity: 25,000
- Length: 330 m (360 yd)
- Track: speedway

SGP Results
- Attendance: 11,000
- Best Time: (Sweden) Andreas Jonsson; 60.84 secs (in Heat 22)
- (gold) Winner: (Australia) Chris Holder
- (silver) Runner-up: (Poland) Tomasz Gollob
- (bronze) 3rd place: (Poland) Jaroslaw Hampel

The 2012 FIM Fogo European Speedway Grand Prix was the second race of the 2012 Speedway Grand Prix season. It took place on 28 April at the Alfred Smoczyk Stadium in Leszno, Poland.

The last SGP in Leszno was won by Chris Holder who beat Tomasz Gollob, Jarosław Hampel and Andreas Jonsson in the final.

== Riders ==
The Speedway Grand Prix Commission nominated Przemysław Pawlicki as Wild Card, and Tobiasz Musielak and Piotr Pawlicki, Jr. both as Track Reserves. The Draw was made on 27 April.

== Heat details ==
| Placing | Draw | Rider | Total | 1 | 2 | 3 | 4 | 5 | 6 | 7 | 8 | 9 | 10 | 11 | 12 | 13 | 14 | 15 | 16 | 17 | 18 | 19 | 20 | Pts | Pos | 21 | 22 | 23 |
|---|---|---|---|---|---|---|---|---|---|---|---|---|---|---|---|---|---|---|---|---|---|---|---|---|---|---|---|---|
| 1 | 14 | (Australia) (8) Chris Holder | 19 | | | | 0 | | 3 | | | | | 2 | | 2 | | | | | | | 3 | 10 | 4 | 3 | | 3 |
| 2 | 8 | (Poland) (5) Tomasz Gollob | 16 | | 1 | | | | | | 0 | | | 3 | | | 3 | | | 3 | | | | 10 | 3 | | 2 | 2 |
| 3 | 6 | (Poland) (3) Jarosław Hampel | 15 | | 3 | | | | 1 | | | 2 | | | | | | | 1 | | | 3 | | 10 | 5 | | 3 | 1 |
| 4 | 4 | (Sweden) (2) Andreas Jonsson | 13 | 1 | | | | | | | 3 | | | | 3 | | | | 3 | | | | 1 | 11 | 1 | 2 | | 0 |
| 5 | 16 | (Australia) (4) Jason Crump | 12 | | | | 2 | | | | 2 | 3 | | | | | | 3 | | | 1 | | | 11 | 2 | | 1 |
| 6 | 7 | (Denmark) (10) Nicki Pedersen | 10 | | 2 | | | | | 0 | | | | | 2 | 3 | | | | | 2 | | | 9 | 6 | 1 |
| 7 | 2 | (United States) (1) Greg Hancock | 9 | 3 | | | | | 2 | | | | 2 | | | | 2 | | | | 0 | | | 9 | 7 | R3 |
| 8 | 15 | (Denmark) (7) Kenneth Bjerre | 8 | | | | 3 | | | 1 | | | 3 | | | | | | 0 | 1 | | | | 8 | 8 | | 0 |
| 9 | 9 | (Sweden) (9) Fredrik Lindgren | 8 | | | 2 | | 1 | | | | | | F3 | | | | | 2 | | 3 | | | 8 | 9 |
| 10 | 11 | (Poland) (16) Przemysław Pawlicki | 7 | | | 3 | | | | 3 | | 1 | | | | | 0 | | | | | | 0 | 7 | 10 |
| 11 | 3 | (Russia) (6) Emil Sayfutdinov | 7 | 2 | | | | | | 2 | | | | 1 | | | | 0 | | | | 2 | | 7 | 11 |
| 12 | 1 | (Sweden) (14) Peter Ljung | 6 | 0 | | | | 3 | | | | 0 | | | | 1 | | | | 2 | | | | 6 | 12 |
| 13 | 5 | (Denmark) (15) Hans N. Andersen | 5 | | 0 | | | 2 | | | | | 0 | | | | | 1 | | | | | 2 | 5 | 13 |
| 14 | 10 | (Sweden) (12) Antonio Lindbäck | 4 | | | 1 | | | 0 | | | | | | 1 | | | 2 | | R4 | | | | 4 | 14 |
| 15 | 13 | (United Kingdom) (11) Chris Harris | 3 | | | | 1 | R4 | | | | | | | R | | 1 | | | | | 1 | | 3 | 15 |
| 16 | 12 | (Denmark) (13) Bjarne Pedersen | 2 | | | 0 | | | | | 1 | | 1 | | | 0 | | | | | | 0 | | 2 | 16 |
| 17 | 17 | (Poland) (17) Tobiasz Musielak | - | | | | | | | | | | | | | | | | | | | | | - | 17 |
| 18 | 18 | (Poland) (18) Piotr Pawlicki, Jr. | - | | | | | | | | | | | | | | | | | | | | | - | 18 |
| Placing | Draw | Rider | Total | 1 | 2 | 3 | 4 | 5 | 6 | 7 | 8 | 9 | 10 | 11 | 12 | 13 | 14 | 15 | 16 | 17 | 18 | 19 | 20 | Pts | Pos | 21 | 22 | 23 |

e: retired or mechanical failure • m: exclusion for exceeding two minute time allowance • t: exclusion for touching the tapes • x: other exclusion • f: fell
ns: non-starter • nc: non-classify
Semi-finals: Heat 21: Riders placed 1st, 4th, 6th & 7th in the intermediate classification (after 20 heats)
Heat 22: Riders placed 2nd, 3rd, 5th & 8th in the intermediate classification (after 20 heats)
Big Final (heat 23): The first and second placed riders in each of the Semi-Finals

| gate A – inside | gate B | gate C | gate D – outside |

=== Heat after heat ===
1. (62.40) Hancock, Sayfutdinov, Jonsson, Ljung
2. (62.54) Hampel, N.Pedersen, Gollob, Andersen
3. (61.99) Prz.Pawlicki, Lindgren, Lindbäck, B.Pedersen
4. (62.11) Bjerre, Crump, Harris, Holder
5. (62.85) Ljung, Andersen, Lindgren, Harris (R4)
6. (61.50) Holder, Hancock, Hampel, Lindbäck
7. (61.63) Prz.Pawlicki, Sayfutdinov, Bjerre, N.Pedersen
8. (61.44) Jonsson, Crump, B.Pedersen, Gollob
9. (62.50) Crump, Hampel, Prz.Pawlicki, Ljung
10. (61.84) Bjerre, Hancock, B.Pedersen, Andersen
11. (62.10) Gollob, Holder, Sayfutdinov, Lindgren (F3)
12. (60.84) Jonsson, N.Pedersen, Lindbäck, Harris (R4)
13. (62.95) N.Pedersen, Holder, Ljung, B.Pedersen
14. (62.60) Gollob, Hancock, Harris, Prz.Pawlicki
15. (62.27) Crump, Lindbäck, Andersen, Sayfutdinov
16. (61.66) Jonsson, Lindgren, Hampel, Bjerre
17. (62.71) Gollob, Ljung, Bjerre, Lindbäck (R4)
18. (62.25) Lindgren, N.Pedersen, Crump, Hancock
19. (61.66) Hampel, Sayfutdinov, Harris, B.Pedersen (F4)
20. (63.10) Holder, Andersen, Jonsson, Prz.Pawlicki
  Semi-finals:
21. (61.99) Holder, Jonsson, N.Pedersen, Hancock (R3)
22. (61.41) Hampel, Gollob, Crump, Bjerre
  the Final:
23. (62.43) Holder (6 points), Gollob (4), Hampel (2), Jonsson (0)

== The intermediate classification ==
Qualifies for next season's Grand Prix series
Full-time Grand Prix rider
Wild card, track reserve or qualified reserve

| Pos. | Rider | Points | NZL (New Zealand) | EUR (Poland) | CZE (Czech Republic) | SWE (Sweden) | DEN (Denmark) | POL (Poland) | CRO (Croatia) | ITA (Italy) | GBR (United Kingdom) | SCA (Sweden) | NOR (Denmark) | PL2 (Poland) |
| 1 | (Poland) (3) Jarosław Hampel | 33 | 18 | 15 | | | | | | | | | | |
| 2 | (United States) (1) Greg Hancock | 31 | 22 | 9 | | | | | | | | | | |
| 3 | (Poland) (5) Tomasz Gollob | 31 | 15 | 16 | | | | | | | | | | |
| 4 | (Australia) (4) Jason Crump | 24 | 12 | 12 | | | | | | | | | | |
| 5 | (Australia) (8) Chris Holder | 23 | 4 | 19 | | | | | | | | | | |
| 6 | (Denmark) (10) Nicki Pedersen | 23 | 13 | 10 | | | | | | | | | | |
| 7 | (Sweden) (2) Andreas Jonsson | 17 | 4 | 13 | | | | | | | | | | |
| 8 | (Sweden) (12) Antonio Lindbäck | 17 | 13 | 4 | | | | | | | | | | |
| 9 | (Sweden) (9) Fredrik Lindgren | 16 | 8 | 8 | | | | | | | | | | |
| 10 | (Russia) (6) Emil Sayfutdinov | 15 | 8 | 7 | | | | | | | | | | |
| 11 | (Denmark) (7) Kenneth Bjerre | 12 | 4 | 8 | | | | | | | | | | |
| 12 | (Denmark) (15) Hans N. Andersen | 11 | 6 | 5 | | | | | | | | | | |
| 13 | (Sweden) (14) Peter Ljung | 10 | 4 | 6 | | | | | | | | | | |
| 14 | (Denmark) (13) Bjarne Pedersen | 9 | 7 | 2 | | | | | | | | | | |
| 15 | (United Kingdom) (11) Chris Harris | 8 | 5 | 3 | | | | | | | | | | |
| 16 | (Poland) (16) Przemysław Pawlicki | 7 | – | 7 | | | | | | | | | | |
| 17 | (United Kingdom) (16) Jason Bunyan | 1 | 1 | – | | | | | | | | | | |
Rider(s) not classified
| | (New Zealand) (17) Grant Tregoning | — | ns | – | | | | | | | | | | |
| | (New Zealand) (18) Sean Mason | — | ns | – | | | | | | | | | | |
| | (Poland) (17) Tobiasz Musielak | — | – | ns | | | | | | | | | | |
| | (Poland) (18) Piotr Pawlicki, Jr. | — | – | ns | | | | | | | | | | |
| Pos. | Rider | Points | NZL (New Zealand) | EUR (Poland) | CZE (Czech Republic) | SWE (Sweden) | DEN (Denmark) | POL (Poland) | CRO (Croatia) | ITA (Italy) | GBR (United Kingdom) | SCA (Sweden) | NOR (Denmark) | PL2 (Poland) |

== See also ==
- motorcycle speedway
