= 2012 Speedway Grand Prix of Czech Republic =

- 2012 FIM Mitas Czech Republic Speedway Grand Prix

Information
- Date: 12 May 2012
- City: (Czech Republic) Prague
- Event: 3 of 12 (147)
- Referee: (Poland) Wojciech Grodzki
- Jury President: (Germany) Wolfgang Glas

Stadium details
- Stadium: Markéta Stadium
- Capacity: 10,000
- Length: 353 m (386 yd)
- Track: speedway

SGP Results
- Attendance: 7,000
- Best Time: (Poland) Tomasz Gollob; 64,14 secs (in Heat 2)
- (gold) Winner: (Denmark) Nicki Pedersen
- (silver) Runner-up: (Australia) Jason Crump
- (bronze) 3rd place: (Poland) Tomasz Gollob

The 2012 FIM Mitas Czech Republic Speedway Grand Prix was the third race of the 2012 Speedway Grand Prix season. It took place on May 12 at the Markéta Stadium in Prague, Czech Republic.

The Grand Prix was won by Nicki Pedersen who beat Jason Crump, Tomasz Gollob and Greg Hancock. All four riders was (Hancock is) World Champions.

== Riders ==
The Speedway Grand Prix Commission nominated Josef Franc as Wild Card, and Václav Milík, Jr. and Matěj Kůs both as Track Reserves. The Draw was made on May 11.

== Heat details ==
Placing	Draw	Rider	Total	1	2	3	4	5	6	7	8	9	10	11	12	13	14	15	16	17	18	19	20	Pts	Pos	21	22	23
1	14	(Denmark) (10) Nicki Pedersen	19				0		2					2		3							3	10	3		3	3
2	3	(Australia) (4) Jason Crump	20	2						3				3				2				3		13	1	3		2
3	5	(Poland) (5) Tomasz Gollob	12		3			2					3					0					0	8	8		2	1
4	10	(United States) (1) Greg Hancock	12			3			1						2			1		3				10	4	2		0
5	6	(Australia) (8) Chris Holder	12		1				3			3							3			1		11	2		1
6	1	(Russia) (6) Emil Sayfutdinov	10	3				3				2				1				1				10	5		0
7	16	(Czech Republic) (16) Josef Franc	9				3				0	0						3			3			9	6	0
8	4	(Sweden) (12) Antonio Lindbäck	9	0							3				3				0				2	8	7	1
9	8	(Denmark) (15) Hans N. Andersen	6		0						2			1			3			0				6	9
10	7	(Poland) (3) Jarosław Hampel	6		2					0					0	2					2			6	10
11	12	(Denmark) (13) Bjarne Pedersen	6			1					1		2			0						2		6	11
12	15	(United Kingdom) (11) Chris Harris	6				1			2			0						1	2				6	12
13	11	(Sweden) (9) Fredrik Lindgren	6			2				1		1					1						1	6	13
14	13	(Sweden) (14) Peter Ljung	5				2	0							1		2					0		5	14
15	9	(Denmark) (7) Kenneth Bjerre	3			M/-		1						0					2		0			3	15
16	2	(Sweden) (2) Andreas Jonsson	3	1					0				1				R				1			3	16
17	17	(Czech Republic) (17) Václav Milík, Jr.	0			0																		0	17
18	18	(Czech Republic) (18) Matěj Kůs	-																					-	18
Placing	Draw	Rider	Total	1	2	3	4	5	6	7	8	9	10	11	12	13	14	15	16	17	18	19	20	Pts	Pos	21	22	23

e: retired or mechanical failure • m: exclusion for exceeding two minute time allowance • t: exclusion for touching the tapes • x: other exclusion • f: fell
ns: non-starter • nc: non-classify
Semi-finals: Heat 21: Riders placed 1st, 4th, 6th & 7th in the intermediate classification (after 20 heats)
Heat 22: Riders placed 2nd, 3rd, 5th & 8th in the intermediate classification (after 20 heats)
Big Final (heat 23): The first and second placed riders in each of the Semi-Finals

gate A – inside	gate B	gate C	gate D – outside

=== Heat after heat ===
1. (64,25) Sayfutdinov, Crump, Jonsson, Lindbäck
2. (64,14) Gollob, Hampel, Holder, Andersen
3. (64,65) Hancock, Lindgren, B.Pedersen, Milík (Bjerre M)
4. (64,28) Franc, Ljung, Harris, N.Pedersen
5. (64,61) Sayfutdinov, Gollob, Bjerre, Ljung
6. (64,21) Holder, N.Pedersen, Hancock, Jonsson
7. (64,60) Crump, Harris, Lindgren, Hampel
8. (64,84) Lindbäck, Andersen, B.Pedersen, Franc
9. (65,11) Holder, Sayfutdinov, Lindgren, Franc
10. (65,59) Gollob, B.Pedersen, Jonsson, Harris
11. (65,72) Crump, N.Pedersen, Andersen, Bjerre
12. (65,73) Lindbäck, Hancock, Ljung, Hampel
13. (66,03) N.Pedersen, Hampel, Sayfutdinov, B.Pedersen
14. (66,70) Andersen, Ljung, Lindgren, Jonsson (R)
15. (66,03) Franc, Crump, Hancock, Gollob
16. (65,60) Holder, Bjerre, Harris, Lindbäck
17. (65,94) Hancock, Harris, Sayfutdinov, Andersen
18. (66,17) Franc, Hampel, Jonsson, Bjerre
19. (66,45) Crump, B.Pedersen, Holder, Ljung
20. (66,21) N.Pedersen, Lindbaeck, Lindbäck, Gollob
  Semifinals
21. (66,43) Crump, Hancock, Lindbaeck, Franc
22. (65,92) N.Pedersen, Gollob, Holder, Sayfutdinov
  the Final
23. (66,50) N.Pedersen, Crump, Gollob, Hancock

== The intermediate classification ==
Qualifies for next season's Grand Prix series
Full-time Grand Prix rider
Wild card, track reserve or qualified reserve

Pos.	Rider	Points	NZL (New Zealand)	EUR (Poland)	CZE (Czech Republic)	SWE (Sweden)	DEN (Denmark)	POL (Poland)	CRO (Croatia)	ITA (Italy)	GBR (United Kingdom)	SCA (Sweden)	NOR (Denmark)	PL2 (Poland)
1	(Australia) (4) Jason Crump	44	12	12	20									
2	(United States) (1) Greg Hancock	43	22	9	12									
3	(Poland) (5) Tomasz Gollob	43	15	16	12									
4	(Denmark) (10) Nicki Pedersen	42	13	10	19									
5	(Poland) (3) Jarosław Hampel	39	18	15	6									
6	(Australia) (8) Chris Holder	35	4	19	12									
7	(Sweden) (12) Antonio Lindbäck	26	13	4	9									
8	(Russia) (6) Emil Sayfutdinov	25	8	7	10									
9	(Sweden) (9) Fredrik Lindgren	22	8	8	6									
10	(Sweden) (2) Andreas Jonsson	20	4	13	3									
11	(Denmark) (15) Hans N. Andersen	17	6	5	6									
12	(Denmark) (7) Kenneth Bjerre	15	4	8	3									
13	(Denmark) (13) Bjarne Pedersen	15	7	2	6									
14	(Sweden) (14) Peter Ljung	15	4	6	5									
15	(United Kingdom) (11) Chris Harris	14	5	3	6									
16	(Czech Republic) (16) Josef Franc	9	–	–	9									
17	(Poland) (16) Przemysław Pawlicki	7	–	7	–									
18	(United Kingdom) (16) Jason Bunyan	1	1	–	–									
19	(Czech Republic) (17) Václav Milík, Jr.	0	–	–	0									
Rider(s) not classified
	(New Zealand) (17) Grant Tregoning	—	ns	–	–									
	(New Zealand) (18) Sean Mason	—	ns	–	–									
	(Poland) (17) Tobiasz Musielak	—	–	ns	–									
	(Poland) (18) Piotr Pawlicki, Jr.	—	–	ns	–									
	(Czech Republic) (18) Matěj Kůs	—	–	–	ns									
Pos.	Rider	Points	NZL (New Zealand)	EUR (Poland)	CZE (Czech Republic)	SWE (Sweden)	DEN (Denmark)	POL (Poland)	CRO (Croatia)	ITA (Italy)	GBR (United Kingdom)	SCA (Sweden)	NOR (Denmark)	PL2 (Poland)

== See also ==
- motorcycle speedway
