= 2012 Speedway Grand Prix of New Zealand =

Speedway event

- 2012 FIM Buckley Systems New Zealand SGP

Information
- Date: 31 March 2012
- City: (New Zealand) Auckland
- Event: 1 of 12 (145)
- Referee: Krister Gardell
- Jury President: Anthony Steele

Stadium details
- Stadium: Western Springs Stadium
- Capacity: 15,000
- Length: 413 m (452 yd)
- Track: speedway

SGP Results
- Attendance: 20,000
- Best Time: (Poland) Tomasz Gollob; 65.07 secs (in Heat 1)
- (gold) Winner: (United States) Greg Hancock
- (silver) Runner-up: (Poland) Jarosław Hampel
- (bronze) 3rd place: (Denmark) Nicki Pedersen

The 2012 FIM Buckley Systems New Zealand Speedway Grand Prix was the first round of the 2012 Speedway Grand Prix season. It took place on 31 March at the Western Springs Stadium in Auckland, New Zealand.

It was the inaugural Speedway Grand Prix of New Zealand and only the second outside Europe, after the 2002 Speedway Grand Prix of Australia.

The Grand Prix was won by defending world champion Greg Hancock, who beat Jarosław Hampel, Nicki Pedersen and Janson Crump in the final.

== Riders ==
The Speedway Grand Prix Commission nominated Jason Bunyan as Wild Card, and Grant Tregoning and Andrew Aldridge both as Track Reserves. Sean Mason was renominated as a Reserve #18. The Draw was made on 30 March.

(18) (New Zealand) Andrew Aldridge → (18) (New Zealand) Sean Mason

== Results ==
=== Heat details ===
Placing	Draw	Rider	Total	1	2	3	4	5	6	7	8	9	10	11	12	13	14	15	16	17	18	19	20	Pts	Pos	21	22	23
1	15	(United States) (1) Greg Hancock	22				3			2			3						3	3				14	2		2	3
2	11	(Poland) (3) Jarosław Hampel	18			1				1		3					3						3	11	4	3		2
3	6	(Denmark) (10) Nicki Pedersen	13		1				3			2							2			1		9	6	2		1
4	13	(Australia) (4) Jason Crump	12				2	3							0		2					2		9	5		3	0
5	3	(Poland) (5) Tomasz Gollob	15	3						3				3				2				3		14	1	1
6	10	(Sweden) (12) Antonio Lindbäck	13			3			2						2			3		2				12	3		1
7	4	(Russia) (6) Emil Sayfutdinov	8	1							2				3				X				2	8	7	0
8	9	(Sweden) (9) Fredrik Lindgren	8			2		1						2					1		2			8	8		0
9	7	(Denmark) (13) Bjarne Pedersen	7		2					0					1	3					1			7	9
10	2	(Denmark) (15) Hans N. Andersen	6	0					1				1				1				3			6	10
11	14	(United Kingdom) (11) Chris Harris	5				1		0					1		2							1	5	11
12	16	(Australia) (8) Chris Holder	4				0				3	1						0			0			4	12
13	5	(Sweden) (2) Andreas Jonsson	4		3			0					0					1					R	4	13
14	1	(Denmark) (7) Kenneth Bjerre	4	2				2				R				R				0				4	14
15	12	(Sweden) (14) Peter Ljung	4			0					1		2			1						0		4	15
16	8	(United Kingdom) (16) Jason Bunyan^{1}	1		0						0			0			0			1				1	16
17	17	(New Zealand) (17) Grant Tregoning	-																					-	17
18	18	(New Zealand) (18) Sean Mason	-																					-	18
Placing	Draw	Rider	Total	1	2	3	4	5	6	7	8	9	10	11	12	13	14	15	16	17	18	19	20	Pts	Pos	21	22	23

e: retired or mechanical failure • m: exclusion for exceeding two minute time allowance • t: exclusion for touching the tapes • x: other exclusion • f: fell
ns: non-starter • nc: non-classify
Semi-finals: Heat 21: Riders placed 1st, 4th, 6th & 7th in the intermediate classification (after 20 heats)
Heat 22: Riders placed 2nd, 3rd, 5th & 8th in the intermediate classification (after 20 heats)
Big Final (heat 23): The first and second placed riders in each of the Semi-Finals

gate A – inside	gate B	gate C	gate D – outside

1. British Jason Bunyan started with New Zealand license (MNZ).

=== Heat after heat ===
1. (65.07) Gollob, Bjerre, Sayfutdinov, Andersen
2. (65.72) Jonsson, B. Pedersen, N. Pedersen, Bunyan
3. (65.34) Lindbäck, Lindgren, Hampel, Ljung
4. (65.37) Hancock, Crump, Harris, Holder
5. (65.84) Crump, Bjerre, Lindgren, Jonsson
6. (66.07) N. Pedersen, Lindbäck, Andersen, Harris
7. (65.63) Gollob, Hancock, Hampel, B. Pedersen
8. (66.12) Holder, Sayfutdinov, Ljung, Bunyan
9. (65.32) Hampel, N. Pedersen, Holder, Bjerre (R)
10. (65.69) Hancock, Ljung, Andersen, Jonsson
11. (66.15) Gollob, Lindgren, Harris, Bunyan
12. (66.19) Sayfutdinov, Lindbäck, B. Pedersen, Crump
13. (66.69) B. Pedersen, Harris, Ljung, Bjerre (R)
14. (66.25) Hampel, Crump, Andersen, Bunyan
15. (66.94) Lindbäck, Gollob, Jonsson, Holder
16. (65.93) Hancock, N. Pedersen, Lindgren, Sayfutdinov (X)
17. (67.18) Hancock, Lindbäck, Bunyan, Bjerre
18. (67.00) Andersen, Lindgren, B. Pedersen, Holder
19. (66.59) Gollob, Crump, N. Pedersen, Ljung
20. (66.59) Hampel, Sayfutdinov, Harris, Jonsson (R)
  Semifinals:
21. (66.25) Hampel, N. Pedersen, Gollob, Sayfutdinov
22. (66.25) Crump, Hancock, Lindbaeck, Lindgren
  The Final:
23. (66.06) Hancock, Hampel, N. Pedersen, Crump

== The intermediate classification ==
Qualifies for next season's Grand Prix series
Full-time Grand Prix rider
Wild card, track reserve or qualified reserve

Pos.	Rider	Points	NZL (New Zealand)	EUR (Poland)	CZE (Czech Republic)	SWE (Sweden)	DEN (Denmark)	POL (Poland)	CRO (Croatia)	ITA (Italy)	GBR (United Kingdom)	SCA (Sweden)	NOR (Denmark)	PL2 (Poland)
1	(United States) (1) Greg Hancock	22	22											
2	(Poland) (3) Jarosław Hampel	18	18											
3	(Poland) (5) Tomasz Gollob	15	15											
4	(Denmark) (10) Nicki Pedersen	13	13											
5	(Sweden) (12) Antonio Lindbäck	13	13											
6	(Australia) (4) Jason Crump	12	12											
7	(Russia) (6) Emil Sayfutdinov	8	8											
8	(Sweden) (9) Fredrik Lindgren	8	8											
9	(Denmark) (13) Bjarne Pedersen	7	7											
10	(Denmark) (15) Hans N. Andersen	6	6											
11	(United Kingdom) (11) Chris Harris	5	5											
12	(Sweden) (2) Andreas Jonsson	4	4											
13	(Denmark) (7) Kenneth Bjerre	4	4											
14	(Australia) (8) Chris Holder	4	4											
15	(Sweden) (14) Peter Ljung	4	4											
16	(United Kingdom) (16) Jason Bunyan	1	1											
Rider(s) not classified
	(New Zealand) (17) Grant Tregoning	—	ns											
	(New Zealand) (18) Sean Mason	—	ns											
Pos.	Rider	Points	NZL (New Zealand)	EUR (Poland)	CZE (Czech Republic)	SWE (Sweden)	DEN (Denmark)	POL (Poland)	CRO (Croatia)	ITA (Italy)	GBR (United Kingdom)	SCA (Sweden)	NOR (Denmark)	PL2 (Poland)

== See also ==
- motorcycle speedway
