= Samo Kukovica =

Slovenian speedway rider

- Born: February 2, 1989 (age 37); Brežice, Slovenia
- Nickname: Kuki
- Nationality: Slovenian

Career history

Poland
- 2010: Miskolc

Denmark
- 2009–2010: Fjelsted

Samo Kukovica (born February 2, 1989, in Brežice, SFR Yugoslavia) is a former motorcycle speedway rider from Slovenia.

== Career ==
Kukovica rode for Fjelsted Speedway Klub in Denmark during the 2009 Danish speedway season and 2010 Danish speedway season. He also rode for Miskolc during the 2010 Polish speedway season.
