= Linus Sundström =

Swedish speedway rider

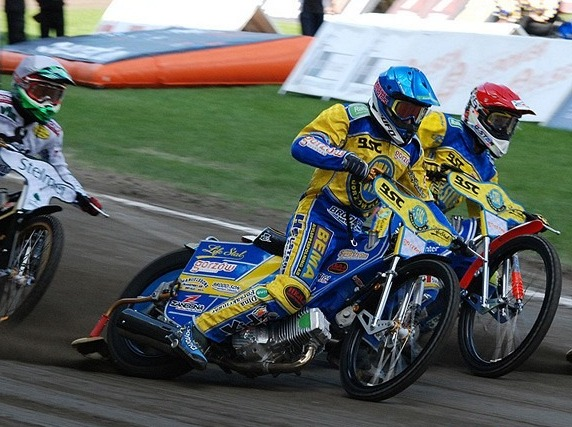
- Sundstrom, Stal Gorzow, 2013
- Born: 28 October 1990 (age 36); Avesta, Sweden
- Nationality: Swedish

Career history

Sweden
- 2007, 2015–2018: Masarna
- 2008–2014, 2018–2019: Piraterna
- 2008–2009: Solkatterna
- 2014–2015: Lejonen
- 2020: Västervik

Great Britain
- 2009–2010: Rye House
- 2010: Ipswich
- 2011–2013: Peterborough
- 2018: Poole

Poland
- 2010: Gniezno
- 2011–2012: Łódź
- 2013–2015, 2017–2018: Gorzów
- 2016–2017: Gdańsk
- 2019: Rybnik
- 2020: Daugavpils

Denmark
- 2009, 2012–2013: Grindsted
- 2010–2011, 2021: Fjelsted

Individual honours
- 2007: European U19 Championship
- 2009: Swedish U21 Bronze Medallist
- 2009: Nordic U19 Champion
- 2010, 2011: Swedish U21 Silver Medallist
- 2012: Brandonapolis Champion

Team honours
- 2015: Speedway World Cup Winner
- 2017: Speedway World Cup silver
- 2008: Team U-19 European Champion
- 2011, 2013: Elitserien League Champion
- 2014: Speedway Ekstraliga

Linus Erik Sundström (born 28 October 1990 in Avesta, Sweden) is a former international speedway rider from Sweden.

== Career ==
Sundström's British speedway career started in 2009 with Rye House Rockets and he top scored for them during 2010 while also earning ten rides for Ipswich Witches in the higher division. In 2011, he signed for Peterborough Panthers for the 2011 Elite League speedway season. He stayed with them until 2013. He won the Brandonapolis in 2011.

Sundström was selected in the Swedish National squad for the 2012 & 2013 Speedway World Cups.

Sundström achieved his greatest feat at the 2015 Speedway World Cup, when part of the Swedish team that became world team champions. In the World Cup Final, he scored four points; the team consisted of Andreas Jonsson, Fredrik Lindgren and Antonio Lindbäck.

In 2018, Sundström returned to British speedway after signing for Poole Pirates for the SGB Premiership 2018 season but was replaced mid-season.

On 22 September 2019, Sundström suffered what was described as a horrifying crash in Gdansk. He fractured his left thigh in two places, broke his upper arm and shoulder joint and tore his liver. After recovering from the injury, he signed for Västervik Speedway, but then in May 2021, suffered another serious crash while riding in the Danish league. He suffered seven broken or cracked vertebrae and made the decision to retire from racing.

== Major results ==
=== World individual Championship ===
- 2010 Speedway Grand Prix - 31st
- 2011 Speedway Grand Prix - nc
- 2012 Speedway Grand Prix - 33rd
- 2013 Speedway Grand Prix - 22nd
- 2017 Speedway Grand Prix - 32nd

=== World team Championships ===
- 2015 Speedway World Cup - Winner
- 2017 Speedway World Cup - 2nd

==== European Championship ====
- Individual U-19 European Championship
  - 2007 - Częstochowa - 14th place (3 pts)
  - 2008 - 9th place in Semi-Final 2
  - 2009 - Tarnów - 8th place (7 pts)
- Team U-19 European Championship
  - 2008 Rawicz - European Champion (6 pts)
  - 2009 - Holsted - Runner-up (5 pts)

== See also ==
- Sweden national speedway team
