= Grant Tregoning =

New Zealand speedway rider

- Born: 26 January 1988 (age 38); Christchurch, New Zealand

Career history
- 2008: Buxton
- 2009: Newport

Individual honours
- 2011: New Zealand Champion

Team honours
- 2009: National League Pairs Championship

Grant Tregoning (born 26 January 1988) is former international motorcycle speedway rider from New Zealand.

== Career ==
Tregoning began riding speedway at Moore Park in Christchurch when he was 13 years old. He won the New Zealand under-21 championship for the first time when he was 16 and won it again in the 2007–08 and 2008–09 seasons. He was offered a place in the Mildenhall Fen Tigers team in 2008 but due to a delay with his visa was unable to take his place. However, he was able to travel to Europe in May to compete in a World under-21 qualifying round in Norden, and after this rode in two meetings in England for the Buxton Hitmen in the Conference League.

In 2009, Tregoning rode for the Newport Hornets in the National League where he achieved a 6.81 average for the season. In August he paired with Tony Atkin to win the National League Pairs Championship. He was offered a place in the Newport Wasps Premier League team for 2010 but again due to visa delays he was unable to take his place at the beginning of the season and was replaced by Alex Davies.

Although he did not get another opportunity to ride speedway professionally, Tregoning continued to have success at home. In 2011, he won the New Zealand Championship and he almost won it again in 2014 when he led the final until the last corner before being overtaken by Jason Bunyan in the last few metres. He also won the Burt Munro Challenge trophy six times and is a four-time winner of the South Island Championship.

In 2012, Tregoning won his fourth consecutive South Island championship.

In 2012 and 2014, Tregoning was selected as a reserve for the Speedway Grand Prix of New Zealand when it was held in Auckland.
