= Tobiasz Musielak =

Polish motorcycle speedway rider (born 1993)

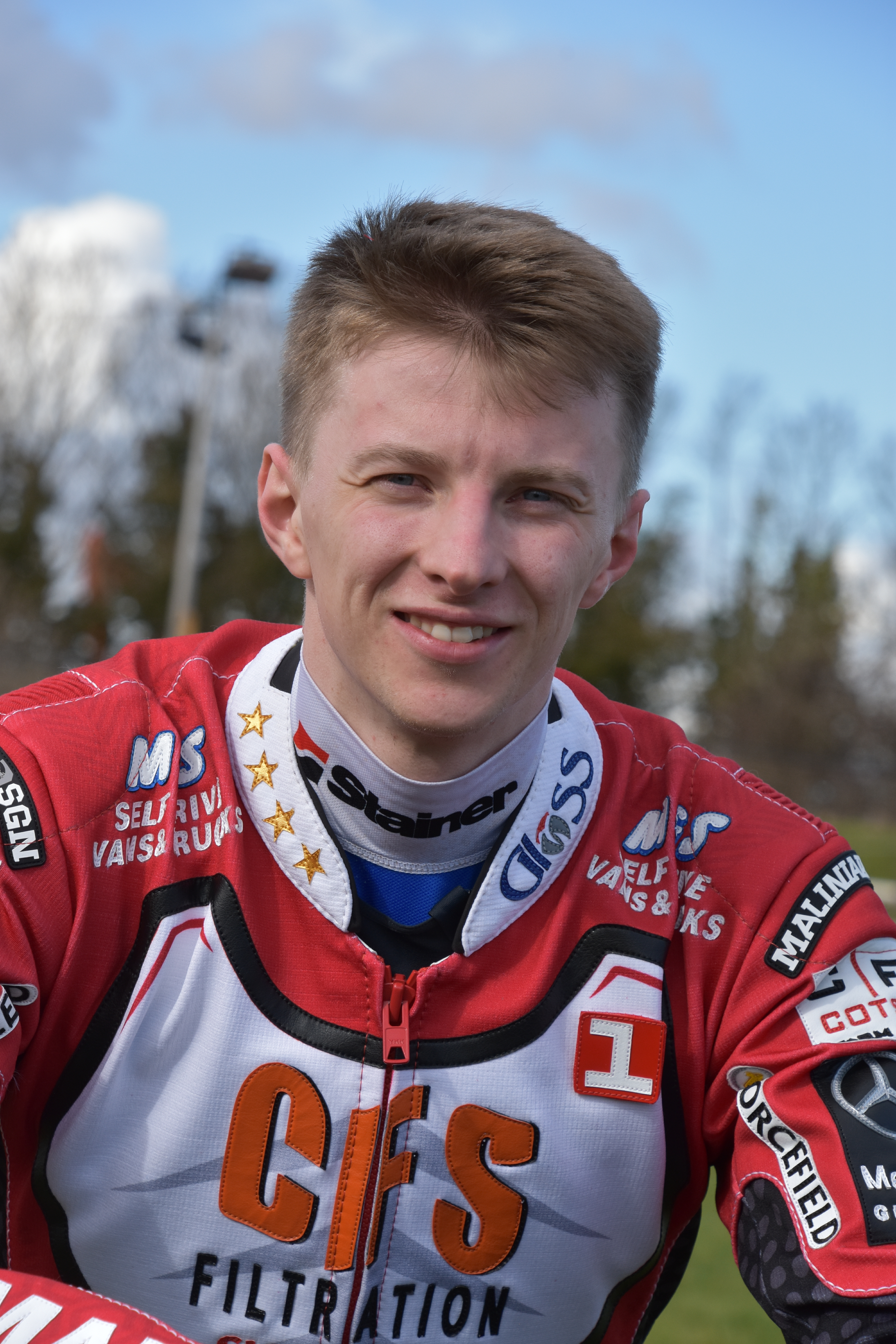
- Born: 18 August 1993 (age 33); Leszno, Poland
- Nationality: Polish

Career history

Poland
- 2010: Rawicz
- 2011–2016: Leszno
- 2017: Rybnik
- 2018: Częstochowa
- 2019: Łódź
- 2020: Grudziądz
- 2020: Toruń
- 2021–2022, 2025–2026: Krosno
- 2023: Ostrów

Great Britain
- 2015: Wolverhamton
- 2017–2019: Swindon
- 2022–2023: Sheffield
- 2024: King's Lynn
- 2025: Birmingham
- 2026: Ipswich

Sweden
- 2012: Hammarby
- 2013–2014: Västervik
- 2015: Lejonen
- 2016–2018: Vetlanda

Denmark
- 2016: Esbjerg
- 2024: Grindsted

Individual honours
- 2012: Individual Speedway Junior European Championship runner-up

Team honours
- 2017, 2019, 2023: SGB Premiership
- 2022: League Cup

Tobiasz Musielak (born 18 August 1993 in Leszno, Poland) is a Polish motorcycle speedway rider.

== Career ==
Musielak, the younger brother of fellow Speedway rider Sławomir Musielak, mirrored the early career of his brother by starting his career with Unia Leszno who Tobiasz still rides for today after first riding for them in 2009. In 2011, he became a member of the Polish national junior speedway team, and in 2012, he was the runner-up in the Individual Speedway Junior European Championship.

Musielak was given his first opportunity in British Speedway by the Wolverhampton Wolves who named him in their 2015 line-up. Wolves promoter Chris Van Straaten described Musielak as "a really entertaining rider and a really exciting prospect". He rode with Swindon Robins in 2017 when they became SGB Premiership champions, but did not ride in the UK in 2018. He returned for 2019, winning a second SGB Premiership with the Robins.

In 2022, Musielak rode for the Sheffield Tigers in the SGB Premiership 2022. He helped Sheffield win the League cup and reach the Play off final. Also in 2022, he helped Wilki Krosno win the 2022 1.Liga.

Musielak signed again for Sheffield for the SGB Premiership 2023 and this time won the league title with the club.

Musielak signed for King's Lynn Stars for the 2024 season, but left in July following an ankle injury.

Musielak signed for Birmingham Brummies for the SGB Premiership 2025.
