= Jason Bunyan =

British speedway rider

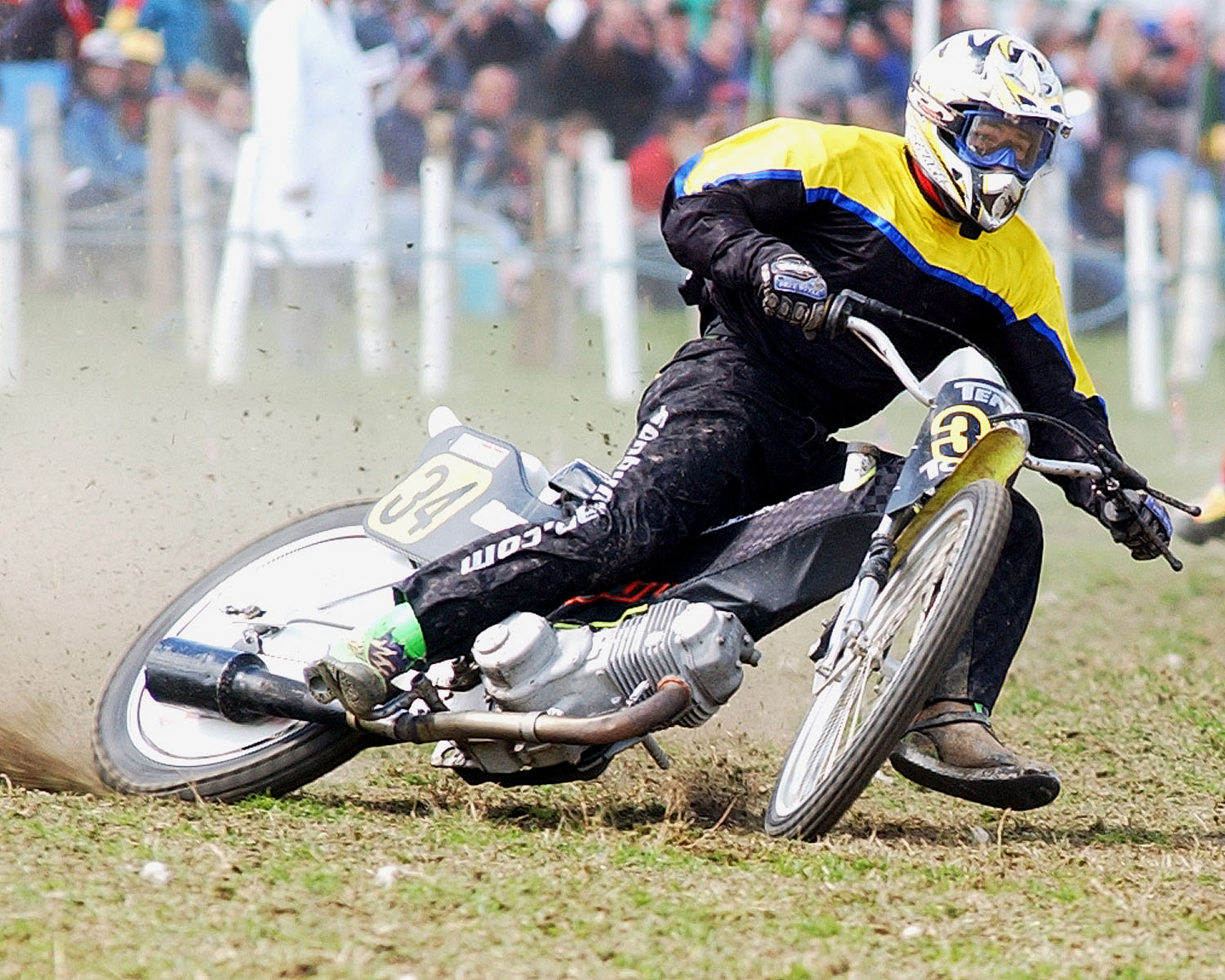
- Bunyan riding grasstrack in 2003
- Born: 9 March 1979 (age 47); Milton Keynes, England
- Nationality: British/New Zealander

Career history
- 1995: Poole Pirates
- 1997: Oxford Cheetahs
- 1997-1998, 2004-2008: Isle of Wight Islanders
- 1999-2001: Ipswich Witches
- 2002: Reading Racers
- 2003-2004: Coventry Bees
- 2009-2010: Stoke Potters
- 2011: Plymouth Devils
- 2012-2014: Rye House Rockets
- 2012: Peterborough Panthers

Individual honours
- 2004, 2005, 2006 2008, 2009, 2010, 2012, 2013, 2014 2016: New Zealand Champion

Team honours
- 2007: Premier League Fours Champion
- 2007: Premier League Pairs Champion
- 1998: Young Shield winner
- 1997: Conference League champion

Jason Michael Bunyan (born 9 March 1979 in Milton Keynes) is a former England under-21 international motorcycle speedway rider from England. He is a ten times champion of New Zealand.

== Racing career ==
Bunyan won the New Zealand Championship from 2004 to 2006, 2008 to 2010, 2012 to 2014 and 2016. The ten wins broke the previous record of nine wins held by Larry Ross.

Bunyan began his British leagues career when signing for Poole Pirates for the 1995 Premier League speedway season. After a season with Oxford Cheetahs he moved to join the Isle of Wight Islanders from 1997 to 1998. He spent three seasons with Ipswich Witches from 1999 to 2001 and two seasons with Coventry from 2003 to 2004 before turning his attention to New Zealand after every British season.

In 2007, Bunyan captained the Isle of Wight Islanders to the Premier League Fours Championship, held on 8 July 2007, at the East of England Arena and partnered Chris Holder to the Premier League Pairs title. From 2009 to 2010, he rode for Stoke Potters and was made the club captain.

For 2011, Bunyan signed with the Plymouth Devils before moving to Rye House Rockets in 2012. He remained with the Rockets until August 2014 when he was injured and subsequently retired after the season.

== World Speedway Championship ==
=== Grand-Prix Appearances ===
- 2012 (New Zealand) Auckland (16th) 1pt
- 2013 (New Zealand) Auckland (16th) 1pt
- 2014 (New Zealand) Auckland (15th) 2pts

== World Longtrack Championship ==
Grand-Prix Series

- 1999 2 app (19th) 7pts

== Personal life ==
Outside of speedway, Bunyan enjoys snowboarding and spends the winter in New Zealand. He is married to Zoe Irons and they have a daughter; they live near Auckland, New Zealand.
