= 2019 Speedway Grand Prix of Germany =

- 2019 Aztorin German FIM Speedway Grand Prix

Information
- Date: 31 August 2019
- City: (Germany) Teterow
- Event: 7 of 10
- Referee: (Denmark) Jesper Steentoft

Stadium details
- Stadium: Bergring Arena
- Length: 314 m (343 yd)

SGP Results
- Best Time
- (gold) Winner: (Poland) Maciej Janowski
- (silver) Runner-up: (Poland) Bartosz Zmarzlik
- (bronze) 3rd place: (Slovenia) Matej Žagar

The 2019 Aztorin German FIM Speedway Grand Prix was the seventh race of the 2019 Speedway Grand Prix season. It took place on August 31 at the Bergring Arena in Teterow, Germany.

== Riders ==
First reserve Robert Lambert replaced Greg Hancock. The Speedway Grand Prix Commission nominated Martin Smolinski as the wild card, and Kai Huckenbeck and Max Dilger both as Track Reserves.

== Results ==
The Grand Prix was won by Maciej Janowski, who beat Bartosz Zmarzlik, Matej Žagar and Niels-Kristian Iversen in the final. It was the sixth Grand Prix win of Janowski's career.

Zmarzlik's second-place finish saw him move to joint-top of the overall standings with Leon Madsen on 85 points (see intermediate classification table below). Madsen, who had a six-point lead heading into the Grand Prix, was eliminated in the semi-finals.

=== Heat details ===
Placing	Draw	Rider	Total	1	2	3	4	5	6	7	8	9	10	11	12	13	14	15	16	17	18	19	20	Pts	Pos	21	22	23
Gold	5	(Poland) (71) Maciej Janowski	16		2			2					2					2					2	10	4	3		3
Silver	10	(Poland) (95) Bartosz Zmarzlik	16			3			2						2			3		2				12	1	2		2
Bronze	13	(Slovenia) (55) Matej Žagar	15				3	3							1		3					1		11	2		3	1
4	11	(Denmark) (88) Niels-Kristian Iversen	13			2				3		1					2						3	11	3		2	0
5	9	(Russia) (89) Emil Sayfutdinov	10			0		0						3					3		3			9	5		1
6	1	(Denmark) (30) Leon Madsen	10	3				1				2				0				3				9	6	1
7	12	(Sweden) (66) Fredrik Lindgren	9			1					1		3			2						2		9	7	0
8	16	(Poland) (692) Patryk Dudek	8				0				3	3						1			1			8	8		0
9	8	(Sweden) (85) Antonio Lindbäck	8		3						2			2			0			1				8	9
10	7	(Russia) (222) Artem Laguta	8		1					2					0	3					2			8	10
11	14	(United Kingdom) (108) Tai Woffinden	8				2		3					1		1							1	8	11
12	4	(Australia) (69) Jason Doyle	6	2							0				3				1				0	6	12
13	6	(United Kingdom) (505) Robert Lambert	4		0				1			0							0			3		4	13
14	15	(Slovakia) (54) Martin Vaculík	4				1			1			0						2	0				4	14
15	2	(Poland) (333) Janusz Kołodziej	2	0					0				1				1				0			2	15
16	3	(Germany) (16) Martin Smolinski	1	1						0				0				0						1	16
17	17	(Sweden) (17) Kai Huckenbeck	0																					0	17
Placing	Draw	Rider	Total	1	2	3	4	5	6	7	8	9	10	11	12	13	14	15	16	17	18	19	20	Pts	Pos	21	22	23

e: retired or mechanical failure • m: exclusion for exceeding two minute time allowance • t: exclusion for touching the tapes • x: other exclusion • f: fell
ns: non-starter • nc: non-classify
Semi-finals: Heat 21: Riders placed 1st, 4th, 6th & 7th in the intermediate classification (after 20 heats)
Heat 22: Riders placed 2nd, 3rd, 5th & 8th in the intermediate classification (after 20 heats)
Big Final (heat 23): The first and second placed riders in each of the Semi-Finals

gate A – inside	gate B	gate C	gate D – outside

== Intermediate classification ==
Qualifies for next season's Grand Prix series
Full-time Grand Prix rider
Wild card, track reserve or qualified reserve

Pos.	Rider	Points	POL (Poland)	SVN (Slovenia)	CZE (Czech Republic)	SWE (Sweden)	PL2 (Poland)	SCA (Sweden)	GER (Germany)	DEN (Denmark)	GBR (United Kingdom)	PL3 (Poland)
Gold	(Poland) (95) Bartosz Zmarzlik	85	10	18	8	8	17	8	16	–	–	–
Silver	(Denmark) (30) Leon Madsen	85	13	13	14	7	14	14	10	–	–	–
Bronze	(Russia) (89) Emil Sayfutdinov	78	6	13	11	17	14	7	10	–	–	–
4	(Sweden) (66) Fredrik Lindgren	72	15	5	12	10	5	16	9	–	–	–
5	(Slovakia) (54) Martin Vaculík	72	7	17	4	16	15	9	4	–	–	–
6	(Poland) (692) Patryk Dudek	69	16	12	12	7	8	6	8	–	–	–
7	(Poland) (71) Maciej Janowski	67	–	4	7	13	12	15	16	–	–	–
8	(Russia) (222) Artem Laguta	58	4	9	9	5	7	16	8	–	–	–
9	(Denmark) (88) Niels-Kristian Iversen	54	14	7	3	8	2	7	13	–	–	–
10	(Slovenia) (55) Matej Žagar	52	7	6	4	10	3	7	15	–	–	–
11	(Poland) (333) Janusz Kołodziej	50	4	7	15	3	15	4	2	–	–	–
12	(Australia) (69) Jason Doyle	48	5	6	12	7	5	7	6	–	–	–
13	(Sweden) (85) Antonio Lindbäck	38	10	3	4	6	7	8	–	–	–	–
14	(Australia) (46) Max Fricke	36	3	–	13	11	4	5	–	–	–	–
15	(United Kingdom) (108) Tai Woffinden	35	6	9	–	–	6	6	8	–	–	–
16	(United Kingdom) (505) Robert Lambert	28	8	7	6	3	–	–	4	–	–	–
17	(Poland) (16) Bartosz Smektała	10	10	–	–	–	–	–	–	–	–	–
18	(Denmark) (155) Mikkel Michelsen	9	–	–	–	–	–	9	–	–	–	–
19	(Sweden) (16) Oliver Berntzon	7	–	–	–	7	–	–	–	–	–	–
20	(Czech Republic) (16) Václav Milík	4	–	–	4	–	–	–	–	–	–	–
21	(Poland) (16) Maksym Drabik	4	–	–	–	–	4	–	–	–	–	–
22	(Slovenia) (16) Matic Ivačič	2	–	2	–	–	–	–	–	–	–	–
23	(Sweden) (16) Jacob Thorssell	2	–	–	–	–	–	2	–	–	–	–
24	(Germany) (16) Martin Smolinski	1	–	–	–	–	–	–	1	–	–	–
25	(Czech Republic) (17) Zdeněk Holub	0	–	–	0	–	–	–	–	–	–	–
26	(Germany) (17) Kai Huckenbeck	0	–	–	–	–	–	–	0	–	–	–
Pos.	Rider	Points	POL (Poland)	SVN (Slovenia)	CZE (Czech Republic)	SWE (Sweden)	PL2 (Poland)	SCA (Sweden)	GER (Germany)	DEN (Denmark)	GBR (United Kingdom)	PL3 (Poland)
