= 2019 Speedway Grand Prix of Scandinavia =

Speedway event

(Sweden) 2019 Speedway Grand Prix of Scandinavia
- 2019 Scandinavian FIM Speedway Grand Prix

Information
- Date: 17 August 2019
- City: (Sweden) Målilla
- Event: 6 of 10
- Referee: Artur Kusmierz

Stadium details
- Stadium: G&B Arena
- Capacity: 15,000
- Length: 305 m (334 yd)

SGP Results
- Best Time
- (gold) Winner: (Sweden) Fredrik Lindgren
- (silver) Runner-up: (Denmark) Leon Madsen
- (bronze) 3rd place: (Poland) Maciej Janowski

The 2019 Scandinavian FIM Speedway Grand Prix was the sixth race of the 2019 Speedway Grand Prix season. It took place on August 17 at the G&B Arena in Målilla, Sweden.

== Riders ==
Second reserve Max Fricke replaced Greg Hancock, while third reserve Mikkel Michelsen replaced Antonio Lindbäck. The Speedway Grand Prix Commission nominated Jacob Thorssell as the wild card, and Kim Nilsson and Victor Palovaara both as Track Reserves.

== Results ==
The Grand Prix was won by Fredrik Lindgren, who beat Leon Madsen, Maciej Janowski and Artem Laguta in the final. It was the fourth Grand Prix win of Lindgren's career.

Madsen's second-place finish saw him take control of the overall standings on 75 points, six points clear of Bartosz Zmarzlik in second (see intermediate classification table below).

=== Heat details ===
Placing	Draw	Rider	Total	1	2	3	4	5	6	7	8	9	10	11	12	13	14	15	16	17	18	19	20	Pts	Pos	21	22	23
Gold	10	(Sweden) (66) Fredrik Lindgren	16			2			2						3			1		2				10	4	3		3
Silver	1	(Denmark) (30) Leon Madsen	14	3				2				2				0				3				10	3		2	2
Bronze	5	(Poland) (71) Maciej Janowski	15		3			0					2					3					3	11	2		3	1
4	12	(Russia) (222) Artem Laguta	16			3					3		3			2						3		14	1	2		0
5	2	(Denmark) (155) Mikkel Michelsen	9	2					1				0				2				3			8	5		1
6	3	(Slovakia) (54) Martin Vaculík	9	0						3				1				2				2		8	6	1
7	13	(Poland) (95) Bartosz Zmarzlik	8				3	1							2		1					1		8	7	0
8	9	(Slovenia) (55) Matej Žagar	7			0		3						0					3		1			7	8		0
9	11	(Australia) (69) Jason Doyle	7			1				0		3					3						0	7	9
10	7	(Denmark) (88) Niels-Kristian Iversen	7		2					2					0	3					0			7	10
11	4	(Russia) (89) Emil Sayfutdinov	7	1							2				1				1				2	7	11
12	14	(Poland) (692) Patryk Dudek	6				1		0					3		1							1	6	12
13	15	(United Kingdom) (108) Tai Woffinden	6				2			1			1						2	0				6	13
14	6	(Australia) (46) Max Fricke	5		1				3			1							0			0		5	14
15	8	(Poland) (333) Janusz Kołodziej	4		0						1			2			0			1				4	15
16	16	(Sweden) (16) Jacob Thorssell	2				0				0	0						0			2			2	16
Placing	Draw	Rider	Total	1	2	3	4	5	6	7	8	9	10	11	12	13	14	15	16	17	18	19	20	Pts	Pos	21	22	23

e: retired or mechanical failure • m: exclusion for exceeding two minute time allowance • t: exclusion for touching the tapes • x: other exclusion • f: fell
ns: non-starter • nc: non-classify
Semi-finals: Heat 21: Riders placed 1st, 4th, 6th & 7th in the intermediate classification (after 20 heats)
Heat 22: Riders placed 2nd, 3rd, 5th & 8th in the intermediate classification (after 20 heats)
Big Final (heat 23): The first and second placed riders in each of the Semi-Finals

gate A – inside	gate B	gate C	gate D – outside

== Intermediate classification ==
Qualifies for next season's Grand Prix series
Full-time Grand Prix rider
Wild card, track reserve or qualified reserve

Pos.	Rider	Points	POL (Poland)	SVN (Slovenia)	CZE (Czech Republic)	SWE (Sweden)	PL2 (Poland)	SCA (Sweden)	GER (Germany)	DEN (Denmark)	GBR (United Kingdom)	PL3 (Poland)
Gold	(Denmark) (30) Leon Madsen	75	13	13	14	7	14	14	–	–	–	–
Silver	(Poland) (95) Bartosz Zmarzlik	69	10	18	8	8	17	8	–	–	–	–
Bronze	(Russia) (89) Emil Sayfutdinov	68	6	13	11	17	14	7	–	–	–	–
4	(Slovakia) (54) Martin Vaculík	68	7	17	4	16	15	9	–	–	–	–
5	(Sweden) (66) Fredrik Lindgren	63	15	5	12	10	5	16	–	–	–	–
6	(Poland) (692) Patryk Dudek	61	16	12	12	7	8	6	–	–	–	–
7	(Poland) (71) Maciej Janowski	51	–	4	7	13	12	15	–	–	–	–
8	(Russia) (222) Artem Laguta	50	4	9	9	5	7	16	–	–	–	–
9	(Poland) (333) Janusz Kołodziej	48	4	7	15	3	15	4	–	–	–	–
10	(Australia) (69) Jason Doyle	42	5	6	12	7	5	7	–	–	–	–
11	(Denmark) (88) Niels-Kristian Iversen	41	14	7	3	8	2	7	–	–	–	–
12	(Slovenia) (55) Matej Žagar	37	7	6	4	10	3	7	–	–	–	–
13	(Australia) (46) Max Fricke	36	3	–	13	11	4	5	–	–	–	–
14	(Sweden) (85) Antonio Lindbäck	30	10	3	4	6	7	–	–	–	–	–
15	(United Kingdom) (108) Tai Woffinden	27	6	9	–	–	6	6	–	–	–	–
16	(United Kingdom) (505) Robert Lambert	24	8	7	6	3	–	–	–	–	–	–
17	(Poland) (16) Bartosz Smektała	10	10	–	–	–	–	–	–	–	–	–
18	(Denmark) (155) Mikkel Michelsen	9	–	–	–	–	–	9	–	–	–	–
19	(Sweden) (16) Oliver Berntzon	7	–	–	–	7	–	–	–	–	–	–
20	(Czech Republic) (16) Václav Milík	4	–	–	4	–	–	–	–	–	–	–
21	(Poland) (16) Maksym Drabik	4	–	–	–	–	4	–	–	–	–	–
22	(Slovenia) (16) Matic Ivačič	2	–	2	–	–	–	–	–	–	–	–
23	(Sweden) (16) Jacob Thorssell	2	–	–	–	–	–	2	–	–	–	–
24	(Czech Republic) (17) Zdeněk Holub	0	–	–	0	–	–	–	–	–	–	–
Pos.	Rider	Points	POL (Poland)	SVN (Slovenia)	CZE (Czech Republic)	SWE (Sweden)	PL2 (Poland)	SCA (Sweden)	GER (Germany)	DEN (Denmark)	GBR (United Kingdom)	PL3 (Poland)
