= 2019 Speedway Grand Prix of Sweden =

- 2019 Norrbil Swedish FIM Speedway Grand Prix

Information
- Date: 6 July 2019
- City: (Sweden) Hallstavik
- Event: 4 of 10
- Referee: (Denmark) Jesper Steentoft

Stadium details
- Stadium: HZ Bygg Arena
- Capacity: 10,000
- Length: 289 m (316 yd)

SGP Results
- Best Time
- (gold) Winner: (Russia) Emil Sayfutdinov
- (silver) Runner-up: (Slovakia) Martin Vaculík
- (bronze) 3rd place: (Poland) Maciej Janowski

The 2019 Norrbil Swedish FIM Speedway Grand Prix was the fourth race of the 2019 Speedway Grand Prix season. It took place on July 6 at the HZ Bygg Arena in Hallstavik, Sweden.

== Riders ==
First reserve Robert Lambert replaced the injured world champion Tai Woffinden, while second reserve Max Fricke replaced Greg Hancock. The Speedway Grand Prix Commission nominated Oliver Berntzon as the wild card, and Pontus Aspgren and Kim Nilsson both as Track Reserves.

== Results ==
The Grand Prix was won by Emil Sayfutdinov, who beat Martin Vaculík, Maciej Janowski and Max Fricke in the final. It was the seventh win of Sayfutdinov's career, but his first since 2013. The win also saw him move to the joint-lead of the overall standings, tied on 47 points with Patryk Dudek and Leon Madsen, who both failed to make the semi-finals.

=== Heat details ===
| Placing | Draw | Rider | Total | 1 | 2 | 3 | 4 | 5 | 6 | 7 | 8 | 9 | 10 | 11 | 12 | 13 | 14 | 15 | 16 | 17 | 18 | 19 | 20 | Pts | Pos | 21 | 22 | 23 |
|---|---|---|---|---|---|---|---|---|---|---|---|---|---|---|---|---|---|---|---|---|---|---|---|---|---|---|---|---|
| Gold | 4 | (Russia) (89) Emil Sayfutdinov | 17 | 3 | | | | | | | 3 | | | | 2 | | | | 3 | | | | 1 | 12 | 2 | | 2 | 3 |
| Silver | 13 | (Slovakia) (54) Martin Vaculík | 16 | | | | 3 | 3 | | | | | | | 3 | | 0 | | | | | 3 | | 12 | 1 | 2 | | 2 |
| Bronze | 6 | (Poland) (71) Maciej Janowski | 13 | | 2 | | | | 1 | | | 3 | | | | | | | 2 | | | 1 | | 9 | 5 | | 3 | 1 |
| 4 | 9 | (Australia) (46) Max Fricke | 11 | | | 1 | | 1 | | | | | | 3 | | | | | 0 | | 3 | | | 8 | 6 | 3 | | 0 |
| 5 | 12 | (Slovenia) (55) Matej Žagar | 10 | | | 3 | | | | | 2 | | 3 | | | 1 | | | | | | 0 | | 9 | 3 | | 1 |
| 6 | 2 | (Sweden) (66) Fredrik Lindgren | 10 | 0 | | | | | 3 | | | | 1 | | | | 3 | | | | 2 | | | 9 | 4 | 1 |
| 7 | 15 | (Poland) (95) Bartosz Zmarzlik | 8 | | | | 2 | | | 2 | | | 2 | | | | | | 1 | 1 | | | | 8 | 7 | 0 |
| 8 | 3 | (Denmark) (88) Niels-Kristian Iversen | 8 | 2 | | | | | | 1 | | | | 2 | | | | 1 | | | | 2 | | 8 | 8 | | 0 |
| 9 | 8 | (Denmark) (30) Leon Madsen | 7 | | 3 | | | | | | 0 | | | 0 | | | 1 | | | 3 | | | | 7 | 9 |
| 10 | 14 | (Sweden) (16) Oliver Berntzon | 7 | | | | 1 | | 0 | | | | | 1 | | 2 | | | | | | | 3 | 7 | 10 |
| 11 | 1 | (Australia) (69) Jason Doyle | 7 | 1 | | | | 2 | | | | 2 | | | | 0 | | | | 2 | | | | 7 | 11 |
| 12 | 10 | (Poland) (692) Patryk Dudek | 7 | | | 2 | | | 2 | | | | | | 1 | | | 2 | | 0 | | | | 7 | 12 |
| 13 | 16 | (Sweden) (85) Antonio Lindbäck | 6 | | | | 0 | | | | 1 | 1 | | | | | | 3 | | | 1 | | | 6 | 13 |
| 14 | 11 | (Russia) (222) Artem Laguta | 5 | | | 0 | | | | 3 | | 0 | | | | | 2 | | | | | | 0 | 5 | 14 |
| 15 | 7 | (Poland) (333) Janusz Kołodziej | 3 | | 0 | | | | | 0 | | | | | 0 | 3 | | | | | 0 | | | 3 | 15 |
| 16 | 5 | (United Kingdom) (505) Robert Lambert | 3 | | 1 | | | 0 | | | | | 0 | | | | | 0 | | | | | 2 | 3 | 16 |
| Placing | Draw | Rider | Total | 1 | 2 | 3 | 4 | 5 | 6 | 7 | 8 | 9 | 10 | 11 | 12 | 13 | 14 | 15 | 16 | 17 | 18 | 19 | 20 | Pts | Pos | 21 | 22 | 23 |

e: retired or mechanical failure • m: exclusion for exceeding two minute time allowance • t: exclusion for touching the tapes • x: other exclusion • f: fell
ns: non-starter • nc: non-classify
Semi-finals: Heat 21: Riders placed 1st, 4th, 6th & 7th in the intermediate classification (after 20 heats)
Heat 22: Riders placed 2nd, 3rd, 5th & 8th in the intermediate classification (after 20 heats)
Big Final (heat 23): The first and second placed riders in each of the Semi-Finals

| gate A – inside | gate B | gate C | gate D – outside |

== Intermediate classification ==
Qualifies for next season's Grand Prix series
Full-time Grand Prix rider
Wild card, track reserve or qualified reserve

| Pos. | Rider | Points | POL (Poland) | SVN (Slovenia) | CZE (Czech Republic) | SWE (Sweden) | PL2 (Poland) | SCA (Sweden) | GER (Germany) | DEN (Denmark) | GBR (United Kingdom) | PL3 (Poland) |
| Gold | (Russia) (89) Emil Sayfutdinov | 47 | 6 | 13 | 11 | 17 | – | – | – | – | – | – |
| Silver | (Poland) (692) Patryk Dudek | 47 | 16 | 12 | 12 | 7 | – | – | – | – | – | – |
| Bronze | (Denmark) (30) Leon Madsen | 47 | 13 | 13 | 14 | 7 | – | – | – | – | – | – |
| 4 | (Poland) (95) Bartosz Zmarzlik | 44 | 10 | 18 | 8 | 8 | – | – | – | – | – | – |
| 5 | (Slovakia) (54) Martin Vaculík | 44 | 7 | 17 | 4 | 16 | – | – | – | – | – | – |
| 6 | (Sweden) (66) Fredrik Lindgren | 42 | 15 | 5 | 12 | 10 | – | – | – | – | – | – |
| 7 | (Denmark) (88) Niels-Kristian Iversen | 32 | 14 | 7 | 3 | 8 | – | – | – | – | – | – |
| 8 | (Australia) (69) Jason Doyle | 30 | 5 | 6 | 12 | 7 | – | – | – | – | – | – |
| 9 | (Poland) (333) Janusz Kołodziej | 29 | 4 | 7 | 15 | 3 | – | – | – | – | – | – |
| 10 | (Russia) (222) Artem Laguta | 27 | 4 | 9 | 9 | 5 | – | – | – | – | – | – |
| 11 | (Slovenia) (55) Matej Žagar | 27 | 7 | 6 | 4 | 10 | – | – | – | – | – | – |
| 12 | (Australia) (46) Max Fricke | 27 | 3 | – | 13 | 11 | – | – | – | – | – | – |
| 13 | (Poland) (71) Maciej Janowski | 24 | – | 4 | 7 | 13 | – | – | – | – | – | – |
| 14 | (United Kingdom) (505) Robert Lambert | 24 | 8 | 7 | 6 | 3 | – | – | – | – | – | – |
| 15 | (Sweden) (85) Antonio Lindbäck | 23 | 10 | 3 | 4 | 6 | – | – | – | – | – | – |
| 16 | (United Kingdom) (108) Tai Woffinden | 15 | 6 | 9 | – | – | – | – | – | – | – | – |
| 17 | (Poland) (16) Bartosz Smektała | 10 | 10 | – | – | – | – | – | – | – | – | – |
| 18 | (Sweden) (16) Oliver Berntzon | 7 | – | – | – | 7 | – | – | – | – | – | – |
| 19 | (Czech Republic) (16) Václav Milík | 4 | – | – | 4 | – | – | – | – | – | – | – |
| 20 | (Slovenia) (16) Matic Ivačič | 2 | – | 2 | – | – | – | – | – | – | – | – |
| 21 | (Czech Republic) (17) Zdeněk Holub | 0 | – | – | 0 | – | – | – | – | – | – | – |
| Pos. | Rider | Points | POL (Poland) | SVN (Slovenia) | CZE (Czech Republic) | SWE (Sweden) | PL2 (Poland) | SCA (Sweden) | GER (Germany) | DEN (Denmark) | GBR (United Kingdom) | PL3 (Poland) |
