= 2019 Speedway Grand Prix of Denmark =

- 2019 Danish FIM Speedway Grand Prix sponsored by Ecco

Information
- Date: 7 September 2019
- City: (Denmark) Vojens
- Event: 8 of 10
- Referee: (United Kingdom) Craig Ackroyd

Stadium details
- Stadium: Vojens Speedway Center
- Length: 300 m (330 yd)

SGP Results
- Best Time
- (gold) Winner: (Poland) Bartosz Zmarzlik
- (silver) Runner-up: (Slovenia) Matej Žagar
- (bronze) 3rd place: (Sweden) Fredrik Lindgren

The 2019 Danish FIM Speedway Grand Prix sponsored by Ecco was the eight race of the 2019 Speedway Grand Prix season. It took place on 7 September at the Vojens Speedway Center in Vojens, Denmark.

== Riders ==
First reserve Robert Lambert replaced Greg Hancock. The Speedway Grand Prix Commission nominated Mikkel Michelsen as the wild card, and Michael Jepsen Jensen and Anders Thomsen both as Track Reserves.

== Results ==
The Grand Prix was won by Bartosz Zmarzlik, who beat Matej Žagar, Fredrik Lindgren and Emil Sayfutdinov in the final. It was the sixth Grand Prix win of Zmarzlik's career.

Zmarzlik's win resulted in him moving clear at the top of the overall standings with 103 points. Sayfutdinov moved up to second place on 94 points, while former joint leader Leon Madsen, who failed to reach the semi-finals, dropped down to third on 92 points (see intermediate classification table below).

=== Heat details ===
Placing	Draw	Rider	Total	1	2	3	4	5	6	7	8	9	10	11	12	13	14	15	16	17	18	19	20	Pts	Pos	21	22	23
Gold	8	(Poland) (95) Bartosz Zmarzlik	18		2						3			2			2			3				12	2		3	3
Silver	1	(Slovenia) (55) Matej Žagar	13	1				3				1				1				2				8	7	3		2
Bronze	12	(Sweden) (66) Fredrik Lindgren	15			3					2		3			2						2		12	3		2	1
4	14	(Russia) (89) Emil Sayfutdinov	16				3		2					3		3							3	14	1	2		0
5	13	(Australia) (69) Jason Doyle	12				2	2							3		1					3		11	4	1
6	2	(United Kingdom) (108) Tai Woffinden	11	2					1				2				3				2			10	5		1
7	5	(Sweden) (85) Antonio Lindbäck	9		3			1					1					2					2	9	6	0
8	11	(Slovakia) (54) Martin Vaculík	7			1				3		3					0						0	7	8		0
9	10	(Denmark) (88) Niels-Kristian Iversen	7			2			3						0			1		1				7	9
10	6	(Denmark) (30) Leon Madsen	7		1				0			2							3			1		7	10
11	9	(Denmark) (16) Mikkel Michelsen	6			0		0						1					2		3			6	11
12	4	(Poland) (71) Maciej Janowski	6	3							0				1				1				1	6	12
13	16	(Russia) (222) Artem Laguta	5				0				1	0						3			1			5	13
14	15	(Poland) (692) Patryk Dudek	3				1			2			0						0	0				3	14
15	7	(United Kingdom) (505) Robert Lambert	3		0					1					2	0					0			3	15
16	3	(Poland) (333) Janusz Kołodziej	0	0						0				0				0				0		0	16
Placing	Draw	Rider	Total	1	2	3	4	5	6	7	8	9	10	11	12	13	14	15	16	17	18	19	20	Pts	Pos	21	22	23

e: retired or mechanical failure • m: exclusion for exceeding two minute time allowance • t: exclusion for touching the tapes • x: other exclusion • f: fell
ns: non-starter • nc: non-classify
Semi-finals: Heat 21: Riders placed 1st, 4th, 6th & 7th in the intermediate classification (after 20 heats)
Heat 22: Riders placed 2nd, 3rd, 5th & 8th in the intermediate classification (after 20 heats)
Big Final (heat 23): The first and second placed riders in each of the Semi-Finals

gate A – inside	gate B	gate C	gate D – outside

== Intermediate classification ==
Qualifies for next season's Grand Prix series
Full-time Grand Prix rider
Wild card, track reserve or qualified reserve

Pos.	Rider	Points	POL (Poland)	SVN (Slovenia)	CZE (Czech Republic)	SWE (Sweden)	PL2 (Poland)	SCA (Sweden)	GER (Germany)	DEN (Denmark)	GBR (United Kingdom)	PL3 (Poland)
Gold	(Poland) (95) Bartosz Zmarzlik	103	10	18	8	8	17	8	16	18	–	–
Silver	(Russia) (89) Emil Sayfutdinov	94	6	13	11	17	14	7	10	16	–	–
Bronze	(Denmark) (30) Leon Madsen	92	13	13	14	7	14	14	10	7	–	–
4	(Sweden) (66) Fredrik Lindgren	87	15	5	12	10	5	16	9	15	–	–
5	(Slovakia) (54) Martin Vaculík	79	7	17	4	16	15	9	4	7	–	–
6	(Poland) (71) Maciej Janowski	73	–	4	7	13	12	15	16	6	–	–
7	(Poland) (692) Patryk Dudek	72	16	12	12	7	8	6	8	3	–	–
8	(Slovenia) (55) Matej Žagar	65	7	6	4	10	3	7	15	13	–	–
9	(Russia) (222) Artem Laguta	63	4	9	9	5	7	16	8	5	–	–
10	(Denmark) (88) Niels-Kristian Iversen	61	14	7	3	8	2	7	13	7	–	–
11	(Australia) (69) Jason Doyle	60	5	6	12	7	5	7	6	12	–	–
12	(Poland) (333) Janusz Kołodziej	50	4	7	15	3	15	4	2	0	–	–
13	(Sweden) (85) Antonio Lindbäck	47	10	3	4	6	7	8	–	9	–	–
14	(United Kingdom) (108) Tai Woffinden	46	6	9	–	–	6	6	8	11	–	–
15	(Australia) (46) Max Fricke	36	3	–	13	11	4	5	–	–	–	–
16	(United Kingdom) (505) Robert Lambert	31	8	7	6	3	–	–	4	3	–	–
17	(Denmark) (155) Mikkel Michelsen	15	–	–	–	–	–	9	–	6	–	–
18	(Poland) (16) Bartosz Smektała	10	10	–	–	–	–	–	–	–	–	–
19	(Sweden) (16) Oliver Berntzon	7	–	–	–	7	–	–	–	–	–	–
20	(Czech Republic) (16) Václav Milík	4	–	–	4	–	–	–	–	–	–	–
21	(Poland) (16) Maksym Drabik	4	–	–	–	–	4	–	–	–	–	–
22	(Slovenia) (16) Matic Ivačič	2	–	2	–	–	–	–	–	–	–	–
23	(Sweden) (16) Jacob Thorssell	2	–	–	–	–	–	2	–	–	–	–
24	(Germany) (16) Martin Smolinski	1	–	–	–	–	–	–	1	–	–	–
25	(Czech Republic) (17) Zdeněk Holub	0	–	–	0	–	–	–	–	–	–	–
26	(Germany) (17) Kai Huckenbeck	0	–	–	–	–	–	–	0	–	–	–
Pos.	Rider	Points	POL (Poland)	SVN (Slovenia)	CZE (Czech Republic)	SWE (Sweden)	PL2 (Poland)	SCA (Sweden)	GER (Germany)	DEN (Denmark)	GBR (United Kingdom)	PL3 (Poland)
