= 2019 Speedway Grand Prix of Poland II =

Fifth race of 2019 Speedway Grand Prix

2019 Speedway Grand Prix of Poland
- 2019 Betard Wrocław FIM Speedway Grand Prix of Poland

Information
- Date: 3 August 2019
- City: (Poland) Wrocław
- Event: 5 of 10
- Referee: (Sweden) Krister Gardell

Stadium details
- Stadium: Olympic Stadium
- Capacity: 12,700
- Length: 352 m (385 yd)

SGP Results
- Best Time
- (gold) Winner: (Poland) Bartosz Zmarzlik
- (silver) Runner-up: (Slovakia) Martin Vaculík
- (bronze) 3rd place: (Denmark) Leon Madsen

The 2019 Betard Wrocław FIM Speedway Grand Prix of Poland was the fifth race of the 2019 Speedway Grand Prix season. It took place on August 3 at the Olympic Stadium in Wrocław, Poland.

== Riders ==
Second reserve Max Fricke replaced Greg Hancock. The Speedway Grand Prix Commission nominated Makym Drabik as the wild card, and Przemysław Liszka and Mateusz Cierniak both as Track Reserves.

== Results ==
The Grand Prix was won by Bartosz Zmarzlik, who beat Martin Vaculík, Leon Madsen and Janusz Kołodziej in the final. Emil Sayfutdinov had initially topped the scoring charts along with Kołodziej, however he was eliminated in the semi-finals. It was the fifth Grand Prix win of Zmarzlik's career.

Zmarzlik's win resulted in him moving joint-top of the overall standings, tied on 61 points with Sayfutdinov and Madsen.

=== Heat details ===
Placing	Draw	Rider	Total	1	2	3	4	5	6	7	8	9	10	11	12	13	14	15	16	17	18	19	20	Pts	Pos	21	22	23
Gold	9	(Poland) (95) Bartosz Zmarzlik	17			2		3						1					2		3			11	3		3	3
Silver	16	(Slovakia) (54) Martin Vaculík	15				1				3	1						3			2			10	6	3		2
Bronze	15	(Denmark) (30) Leon Madsen	14				3			3			2						1	2				11	4	2		1
4	12	(Poland) (333) Janusz Kołodziej	15			3					2		3			2						3		13	2		2	0
5	4	(Russia) (89) Emil Sayfutdinov	14	3							1				3				3				3	13	1	1
6	13	(Poland) (71) Maciej Janowski	12				2	2							2		3					2		11	5		1
7	1	(Poland) (692) Patryk Dudek	8	2				0				0				3				3				8	7	0
8	6	(Sweden) (85) Antonio Lindbäck	7		0				3			3							0			1		7	8		0
9	11	(Russia) (222) Artem Laguta	7			1				1		2					2						1	7	9
10	5	(United Kingdom) (108) Tai Woffinden	6		2			1					0					1					2	6	10
11	14	(Australia) (69) Jason Doyle	5				0		2					3		0							0	5	11
12	3	(Sweden) (66) Fredrik Lindgren	5	1						2				2				0				0		5	12
13	7	(Poland) (16) Maksym Drabik	4		3					0					0	1					0			4	13
14	10	(Australia) (46) Max Fricke	4			0			1						1			2		0				4	14
15	2	(Slovenia) (55) Matej Žagar	3	0					0				1				1				1			3	15
16	8	(Denmark) (88) Niels-Kristian Iversen	2		1						0			0			0			1				2	16
Placing	Draw	Rider	Total	1	2	3	4	5	6	7	8	9	10	11	12	13	14	15	16	17	18	19	20	Pts	Pos	21	22	23

e: retired or mechanical failure • m: exclusion for exceeding two minute time allowance • t: exclusion for touching the tapes • x: other exclusion • f: fell
ns: non-starter • nc: non-classify
Semi-finals: Heat 21: Riders placed 1st, 4th, 6th & 7th in the intermediate classification (after 20 heats)
Heat 22: Riders placed 2nd, 3rd, 5th & 8th in the intermediate classification (after 20 heats)
Big Final (heat 23): The first and second placed riders in each of the Semi-Finals

gate A – inside	gate B	gate C	gate D – outside

== Intermediate classification ==
Qualifies for next season's Grand Prix series
Full-time Grand Prix rider
Wild card, track reserve or qualified reserve

Pos.	Rider	Points	POL (Poland)	SVN (Slovenia)	CZE (Czech Republic)	SWE (Sweden)	PL2 (Poland)	SCA (Sweden)	GER (Germany)	DEN (Denmark)	GBR (United Kingdom)	PL3 (Poland)
Gold	(Poland) (95) Bartosz Zmarzlik	61	10	18	8	8	17	–	–	–	–	–
Silver	(Russia) (89) Emil Sayfutdinov	61	6	13	11	17	14	–	–	–	–	–
Bronze	(Denmark) (30) Leon Madsen	61	13	13	14	7	14	–	–	–	–	–
4	(Slovakia) (54) Martin Vaculík	59	7	17	4	16	15	–	–	–	–	–
5	(Poland) (692) Patryk Dudek	55	16	12	12	7	8	–	–	–	–	–
6	(Sweden) (66) Fredrik Lindgren	47	15	5	12	10	5	–	–	–	–	–
7	(Poland) (333) Janusz Kołodziej	44	4	7	15	3	15	–	–	–	–	–
8	(Poland) (71) Maciej Janowski	36	–	4	7	13	12	–	–	–	–	–
9	(Australia) (69) Jason Doyle	35	5	6	12	7	5	–	–	–	–	–
10	(Russia) (222) Artem Laguta	34	4	9	9	5	7	–	–	–	–	–
11	(Denmark) (88) Niels-Kristian Iversen	34	14	7	3	8	2	–	–	–	–	–
12	(Australia) (46) Max Fricke	31	3	–	13	11	4	–	–	–	–	–
13	(Slovenia) (55) Matej Žagar	30	7	6	4	10	3	–	–	–	–	–
14	(Sweden) (85) Antonio Lindbäck	30	10	3	4	6	7	–	–	–	–	–
15	(United Kingdom) (505) Robert Lambert	24	8	7	6	3	–	–	–	–	–	–
16	(United Kingdom) (108) Tai Woffinden	21	6	9	–	–	6	–	–	–	–	–
17	(Poland) (16) Bartosz Smektała	10	10	–	–	–	–	–	–	–	–	–
18	(Sweden) (16) Oliver Berntzon	7	–	–	–	7	–	–	–	–	–	–
19	(Czech Republic) (16) Václav Milík	4	–	–	4	–	–	–	–	–	–	–
20	(Poland) (16) Maksym Drabik	4	–	–	–	–	4	–	–	–	–	–
21	(Slovenia) (16) Matic Ivačič	2	–	2	–	–	–	–	–	–	–	–
22	(Czech Republic) (17) Zdeněk Holub	0	–	–	0	–	–	–	–	–	–	–
Pos.	Rider	Points	POL (Poland)	SVN (Slovenia)	CZE (Czech Republic)	SWE (Sweden)	PL2 (Poland)	SCA (Sweden)	GER (Germany)	DEN (Denmark)	GBR (United Kingdom)	PL3 (Poland)
