= 2019 Speedway Grand Prix of Great Britain =

2019 racing event

(United Kingdom) 2019 Speedway Grand Prix of Great Britain
- 2019 Adrian Flux British FIM Speedway Grand Prix

Information
- Date: 21 September 2019
- City: (United Kingdom) Cardiff
- Event: 9 of 10
- Referee: (Denmark) Jesper Steentoft

Stadium details
- Stadium: Principality Stadium
- Length: 272 m (297 yd)

SGP Results
- Best Time
- (gold) Winner: (Denmark) Leon Madsen
- (silver) Runner-up: (Russia) Emil Sayfutdinov
- (bronze) 3rd place: (Poland) Bartosz Zmarzlik

The 2019 Adrian Flux British FIM Speedway Grand Prix was the ninth and penultimate race of the 2019 Speedway Grand Prix season. It took place on 21 September at the Principality Stadium in Cardiff, Wales.

== Riders ==
First reserve Robert Lambert replaced Greg Hancock. The Speedway Grand Prix Commission nominated Charles Wright as the wild card, and Danny King and Chris Harris both as Track Reserves.

== Results ==
The Grand Prix was won by Leon Madsen, who beat Emil Sayfutdinov, Bartosz Zmarzlik and Jason Doyle in the final. It was the second win Grand Prix win of Madsen's career.

Sayfutdinov and Madsen both closed in on overall leader Zmarzlik by claiming 17 points, however the Pole's third place meant he took a nine-point lead into the final round of the year in Toruń (see intermediate classification table below).

=== Heat details ===
Placing	Draw	Rider	Total	1	2	3	4	5	6	7	8	9	10	11	12	13	14	15	16	17	18	19	20	Pts	Pos	21	22	23
Gold	6	(Denmark) (30) Leon Madsen	17		1				2			2							3			3		11	4	3		3
Silver	10	(Russia) (89) Emil Sayfutdinov	17			3			1						3			3		3				13	1	2		2
Bronze	9	(Poland) (95) Bartosz Zmarzlik	15			1		3						3					1		3			11	2		3	1
4	12	(Australia) (69) Jason Doyle	13			2					3		2			2						2		11	5		2	0
5	14	(Sweden) (66) Fredrik Lindgren	11				2		3					2		1							3	11	3		0
6	2	(Slovakia) (54) Martin Vaculík	9	0					0				3				3				2			8	7	1
7	1	(Sweden) (85) Antonio Lindbäck	9	3				0				1				3				2				9	6	0
8	4	(Slovenia) (55) Matej Žagar	9	1							2				1				2				2	8	8		1
9	5	(Poland) (71) Maciej Janowski	7		3			2					1					0					1	7	9
10	15	(Russia) (222) Artem Laguta	6				3			3			0						0	0				6	10
11	16	(United Kingdom) (505) Robert Lambert	6				1				0	3						2			0			6	11
12	13	(United Kingdom) (108) Tai Woffinden	5				0	1							2		2					0		5	12
13	7	(United Kingdom) (16) Charles Wright	5		2					2					0	0					1			5	13
14	3	(Denmark) (88) Niels-Kristian Iversen	5	2						1				0				1				1		5	14
15	8	(Poland) (692) Patryk Dudek	3		0						1			1			0			1				3	15
16	11	(Poland) (333) Janusz Kołodziej	1			0				0		0					1						0	1	16
Placing	Draw	Rider	Total	1	2	3	4	5	6	7	8	9	10	11	12	13	14	15	16	17	18	19	20	Pts	Pos	21	22	23

e: retired or mechanical failure • m: exclusion for exceeding two minute time allowance • t: exclusion for touching the tapes • x: other exclusion • f: fell
ns: non-starter • nc: non-classify
Semi-finals: Heat 21: Riders placed 1st, 4th, 6th & 7th in the intermediate classification (after 20 heats)
Heat 22: Riders placed 2nd, 3rd, 5th & 8th in the intermediate classification (after 20 heats)
Big Final (heat 23): The first and second placed riders in each of the Semi-Finals

gate A – inside	gate B	gate C	gate D – outside

== Intermediate classification ==
Qualifies for next season's Grand Prix series
Full-time Grand Prix rider
Wild card, track reserve or qualified reserve

Pos.	Rider	Points	POL (Poland)	SVN (Slovenia)	CZE (Czech Republic)	SWE (Sweden)	PL2 (Poland)	SCA (Sweden)	GER (Germany)	DEN (Denmark)	GBR (United Kingdom)	PL3 (Poland)
Gold	(Poland) (95) Bartosz Zmarzlik	118	10	18	8	8	17	8	16	18	15	–
Silver	(Russia) (89) Emil Sayfutdinov	111	6	13	11	17	14	7	10	16	17	–
Bronze	(Denmark) (30) Leon Madsen	109	13	13	14	7	14	14	10	7	17	–
4	(Sweden) (66) Fredrik Lindgren	98	15	5	12	10	5	16	9	15	11	–
5	(Slovakia) (54) Martin Vaculík	88	7	17	4	16	15	9	4	7	9	–
6	(Poland) (71) Maciej Janowski	80	–	4	7	13	12	15	16	6	7	–
7	(Poland) (692) Patryk Dudek	75	16	12	12	7	8	6	8	3	3	–
8	(Slovenia) (55) Matej Žagar	74	7	6	4	10	3	7	15	13	9	–
9	(Australia) (69) Jason Doyle	73	5	6	12	7	5	7	6	12	13	–
10	(Russia) (222) Artem Laguta	69	4	9	9	5	7	16	8	5	6	–
11	(Denmark) (88) Niels-Kristian Iversen	66	14	7	3	8	2	7	13	7	5	–
12	(Sweden) (85) Antonio Lindbäck	56	10	3	4	6	7	8	–	9	9	–
13	(Poland) (333) Janusz Kołodziej	51	4	7	15	3	15	4	2	0	1	–
14	(United Kingdom) (108) Tai Woffinden	51	6	9	–	–	6	6	8	11	5	–
15	(United Kingdom) (505) Robert Lambert	37	8	7	6	3	–	–	4	3	6	–
16	(Australia) (46) Max Fricke	36	3	–	13	11	4	5	–	–	–	–
17	(Denmark) (155) Mikkel Michelsen	15	–	–	–	–	–	9	–	6	–	–
18	(Poland) (16) Bartosz Smektała	10	10	–	–	–	–	–	–	–	–	–
19	(Sweden) (16) Oliver Berntzon	7	–	–	–	7	–	–	–	–	–	–
20	(United Kingdom) (16) Charles Wright	5	–	–	–	–	–	–	–	–	5	–
21	(Czech Republic) (16) Václav Milík	4	–	–	4	–	–	–	–	–	–	–
22	(Poland) (16) Maksym Drabik	4	–	–	–	–	4	–	–	–	–	–
23	(Slovenia) (16) Matic Ivačič	2	–	2	–	–	–	–	–	–	–	–
24	(Sweden) (16) Jacob Thorssell	2	–	–	–	–	–	2	–	–	–	–
25	(Germany) (16) Martin Smolinski	1	–	–	–	–	–	–	1	–	–	–
26	(Czech Republic) (17) Zdeněk Holub	0	–	–	0	–	–	–	–	–	–	–
27	(Germany) (17) Kai Huckenbeck	0	–	–	–	–	–	–	0	–	–	–
Pos.	Rider	Points	POL (Poland)	SVN (Slovenia)	CZE (Czech Republic)	SWE (Sweden)	PL2 (Poland)	SCA (Sweden)	GER (Germany)	DEN (Denmark)	GBR (United Kingdom)	PL3 (Poland)
