= 2019 Speedway Grand Prix of Poland III =

2019 Speedway Grand Prix of Poland
- 2019 Revline Toruń FIM Speedway Grand Prix of Poland

Information
- Date: 5 October 2019
- City: (Poland) Toruń
- Event: 10 of 10
- Referee: (Denmark) Krister Gardell

Stadium details
- Stadium: Marian Rose MotoArena
- Capacity: 15,500
- Length: 325 m (355 yd)

SGP Results
- Best Time
- (gold) Winner: (Denmark) Leon Madsen
- (silver) Runner-up: (Russia) Emil Sayfutdinov
- (bronze) 3rd place: (Denmark) Niels-Kristian Iversen

The 2019 Revline Toruń FIM Speedway Grand Prix of Poland was the tenth and final race of the 2019 Speedway Grand Prix season. It took place on October 5 at the Marian Rose MotoArena in Toruń, Poland.

== Riders ==
First reserve Robert Lambert replaced Greg Hancock. The Speedway Grand Prix Commission nominated Adrian Miedziński as the wild card, and Jakub Miśkowiak and Karol Żupiński both as Track Reserves.

== Results ==
The Grand Prix was won by Leon Madsen, who beat Emil Sayfutdinov, Niels-Kristian Iversen and Bartosz Zmarzlik in the final. It was the third win Grand Prix win of Madsen's career, and his second in a row after winning the 2019 Speedway Grand Prix of Great Britain.

Despite scoring a maximum 21 points, Madsen could not overhaul Zmarzlik in the race for the world title - losing out by just two points. Zmarzlik was crowned world champion, becoming the first Polish rider to win the title since Tomasz Gollob in 2010 Speedway Grand Prix

Sayfutdinov and Madsen both closed in on overall leader Zmarzlik by claiming 17 points, however the Pole's third place meant he took a nine-point lead into the final round of the year in Toruń (see intermediate classification table below).

=== Heat details ===
| Placing | Draw | Rider | Total | 1 | 2 | 3 | 4 | 5 | 6 | 7 | 8 | 9 | 10 | 11 | 12 | 13 | 14 | 15 | 16 | 17 | 18 | 19 | 20 | Pts | Pos | 21 | 22 | 23 |
|---|---|---|---|---|---|---|---|---|---|---|---|---|---|---|---|---|---|---|---|---|---|---|---|---|---|---|---|---|
| Gold | 13 | (Denmark) (30) Leon Madsen | 21 | | | | 3 | 3 | | | | | | | 3 | | 3 | | | | | 3 | | 15 | 1 | 3 | | 3 |
| Silver | 4 | (Russia) (89) Emil Sayfutdinov | 15 | 3 | | | | | | | 3 | | | | 0 | | | | 3 | | | | 2 | 11 | 2 | | 2 | 2 |
| Bronze | 11 | (Denmark) (88) Niels-Kristian Iversen | 11 | | | 3 | | | | 2 | | 2 | | | | | 1 | | | | | | 0 | 8 | 6 | 2 | | 1 |
| 4 | 5 | (Poland) (95) Bartosz Zmarzlik | 14 | | 3 | | | 2 | | | | | 2 | | | | | 1 | | | | | 3 | 11 | 3 | | 3 | 0 |
| 5 | 10 | (Australia) (69) Jason Doyle | 11 | | | 2 | | | 3 | | | | | | 2 | | | 2 | | 1 | | | | 10 | 4 | 1 |
| 6 | 14 | (United Kingdom) (108) Tai Woffinden | 9 | | | | 1 | | 0 | | | | | 3 | | 3 | | | | | | | 1 | 8 | 5 | | 1 |
| 7 | 1 | (Sweden) (85) Antonio Lindbäck | 7 | 2 | | | | 0 | | | | 0 | | | | 2 | | | | 3 | | | | 7 | 7 | 0 |
| 8 | 6 | (Sweden) (66) Fredrik Lindgren | 7 | | 1 | | | | 1 | | | 3 | | | | | | | 0 | | | 2 | | 7 | 8 | | 0 |
| 9 | 12 | (Russia) (222) Artem Laguta | 7 | | | 1 | | | | | 2 | | 3 | | | 1 | | | | | | 0 | | 7 | 9 |
| 10 | 15 | (Slovakia) (54) Martin Vaculík | 7 | | | | 2 | | | 3 | | | 1 | | | | | | 1 | 0 | | | | 7 | 10 |
| 11 | 7 | (Poland) (71) Maciej Janowski | 7 | | 2 | | | | | 1 | | | | | 1 | 0 | | | | | 3 | | | 7 | 11 |
| 12 | 16 | (Poland) (333) Janusz Kołodziej | 6 | | | | 0 | | | | 1 | 1 | | | | | | 3 | | | 1 | | | 6 | 12 |
| 13 | 2 | (Poland) (16) Adrian Miedziński | 6 | 0 | | | | | 2 | | | | 0 | | | | 2 | | | | 2 | | | 6 | 13 |
| 14 | 8 | (Poland) (692) Patryk Dudek | 4 | | 0 | | | | | | 0 | | | 2 | | | 0 | | | 2 | | | | 4 | 14 |
| 15 | 9 | (Slovenia) (55) Matej Žagar | 4 | | | 0 | | 1 | | | | | | 1 | | | | | 2 | | 0 | | | 4 | 15 |
| 16 | 3 | (United Kingdom) (505) Robert Lambert | 2 | 1 | | | | | | 0 | | | | 0 | | | | 0 | | | | 1 | | 2 | 16 |
| Placing | Draw | Rider | Total | 1 | 2 | 3 | 4 | 5 | 6 | 7 | 8 | 9 | 10 | 11 | 12 | 13 | 14 | 15 | 16 | 17 | 18 | 19 | 20 | Pts | Pos | 21 | 22 | 23 |

e: retired or mechanical failure • m: exclusion for exceeding two minute time allowance • t: exclusion for touching the tapes • x: other exclusion • f: fell
ns: non-starter • nc: non-classify
Semi-finals: Heat 21: Riders placed 1st, 4th, 6th & 7th in the intermediate classification (after 20 heats)
Heat 22: Riders placed 2nd, 3rd, 5th & 8th in the intermediate classification (after 20 heats)
Big Final (heat 23): The first and second placed riders in each of the Semi-Finals

| gate A – inside | gate B | gate C | gate D – outside |

== Final classification ==
Qualifies for next season's Grand Prix series
Full-time Grand Prix rider
Wild card, track reserve or qualified reserve

| Pos. | Rider | Points | POL (Poland) | SVN (Slovenia) | CZE (Czech Republic) | SWE (Sweden) | PL2 (Poland) | SCA (Sweden) | GER (Germany) | DEN (Denmark) | GBR (United Kingdom) | PL3 (Poland) |
| Gold | (Poland) (95) Bartosz Zmarzlik (C) | 132 | 10 | 18 | 8 | 8 | 17 | 8 | 16 | 18 | 15 | 14 |
| Silver | (Denmark) (30) Leon Madsen | 130 | 13 | 13 | 14 | 7 | 14 | 14 | 10 | 7 | 17 | 21 |
| Bronze | (Russia) (89) Emil Sayfutdinov | 126 | 6 | 13 | 11 | 17 | 14 | 7 | 10 | 16 | 17 | 15 |
| 4 | (Sweden) (66) Fredrik Lindgren | 105 | 15 | 5 | 12 | 10 | 5 | 16 | 9 | 15 | 11 | 7 |
| 5 | (Slovakia) (54) Martin Vaculík | 95 | 7 | 17 | 4 | 16 | 15 | 9 | 4 | 7 | 9 | 7 |
| 6 | (Poland) (71) Maciej Janowski | 87 | – | 4 | 7 | 13 | 12 | 15 | 16 | 6 | 7 | 7 |
| 7 | (Australia) (69) Jason Doyle | 84 | 5 | 6 | 12 | 7 | 5 | 7 | 6 | 12 | 13 | 11 |
| 8 | (Poland) (692) Patryk Dudek | 79 | 16 | 12 | 12 | 7 | 8 | 6 | 8 | 3 | 3 | 4 |
| 9 | (Slovenia) (55) Matej Žagar | 78 | 7 | 6 | 4 | 10 | 3 | 7 | 15 | 13 | 9 | 4 |
| 10 | (Denmark) (88) Niels-Kristian Iversen | 77 | 14 | 7 | 3 | 8 | 2 | 7 | 13 | 7 | 5 | 11 |
| 11 | (Russia) (222) Artem Laguta | 76 | 4 | 9 | 9 | 5 | 7 | 16 | 8 | 5 | 6 | 7 |
| 12 | (Sweden) (85) Antonio Lindbäck | 63 | 10 | 3 | 4 | 6 | 7 | 8 | – | 9 | 9 | 7 |
| 13 | (United Kingdom) (108) Tai Woffinden | 60 | 6 | 9 | – | – | 6 | 6 | 8 | 11 | 5 | 9 |
| 14 | (Poland) (333) Janusz Kołodziej | 57 | 4 | 7 | 15 | 3 | 15 | 4 | 2 | 0 | 1 | 6 |
| 15 | (United Kingdom) (505) Robert Lambert | 39 | 8 | 7 | 6 | 3 | – | – | 4 | 3 | 6 | 2 |
| 16 | (Australia) (46) Max Fricke | 36 | 3 | – | 13 | 11 | 4 | 5 | – | – | – | – |
| 17 | (Denmark) (155) Mikkel Michelsen | 15 | – | – | – | – | – | 9 | – | 6 | – | – |
| 18 | (Poland) (16) Bartosz Smektała | 10 | 10 | – | – | – | – | – | – | – | – | – |
| 19 | (Sweden) (16) Oliver Berntzon | 7 | – | – | – | 7 | – | – | – | – | – | – |
| 20 | (United Kingdom) (16) Charles Wright | 5 | – | – | – | – | – | – | – | – | 5 | – |
| 21 | (Czech Republic) (16) Václav Milík | 4 | – | – | 4 | – | – | – | – | – | – | – |
| 22 | (Poland) (16) Maksym Drabik | 4 | – | – | – | – | 4 | – | – | – | – | – |
| 23 | (Poland) (16) Adrian Miedziński | 4 | – | – | – | – | – | – | – | – | – | 4 |
| 24 | (Slovenia) (16) Matic Ivačič | 2 | – | 2 | – | – | – | – | – | – | – | – |
| 25 | (Sweden) (16) Jacob Thorssell | 2 | – | – | – | – | – | 2 | – | – | – | – |
| 26 | (Germany) (16) Martin Smolinski | 1 | – | – | – | – | – | – | 1 | – | – | – |
| 27 | (Czech Republic) (17) Zdeněk Holub | 0 | – | – | 0 | – | – | – | – | – | – | – |
| 28 | (Germany) (17) Kai Huckenbeck | 0 | – | – | – | – | – | – | 0 | – | – | – |
| Pos. | Rider | Points | POL (Poland) | SVN (Slovenia) | CZE (Czech Republic) | SWE (Sweden) | PL2 (Poland) | SCA (Sweden) | GER (Germany) | DEN (Denmark) | GBR (United Kingdom) | PL3 (Poland) |
