= 2019 Speedway Grand Prix of Slovenia =

Speedway world championship event

- 2019 Slovenian FIM Speedway Grand Prix

Information
- Date: 1 June 2019
- City: (Slovenia) Krško
- Event: 2 of 10
- Referee: Craig Ackroyd

Stadium details
- Stadium: Matija Gubec Stadium
- Capacity: 12,000
- Length: 387.7 m (424.0 yd)

SGP Results
- Best Time
- (gold) Winner: (Poland) Bartosz Zmarzlik
- (silver) Runner-up: (Slovakia) Martin Vaculík
- (bronze) 3rd place: (Denmark) Leon Madsen

The 2019 Slovenian FIM Speedway Grand Prix was the second race of the 2019 Speedway Grand Prix season. It took place on June 1 at the Matija Gubec Stadium in Krško, Slovenia.

It was the 14th time that the Speedway Grand Prix of Slovenia had been held but from 2020 was replaced by additional rounds in Poland.

== Riders ==
First reserve Robert Lambert replaced Greg Hancock. The Speedway Grand Prix Commission also nominated Matic Ivačič as the wild card, and Nick Škorja and Denis Štojs both as Track Reserves.

== Results ==
The Grand Prix was won by Bartosz Zmarzlik, who beat Martin Vaculík, Leon Madsen and Patryk Dudek in the final. It was the fourth Grand Prix win of Zmarzlik's career, and his 18-point haul meant he moved to the joint-top of the overall standings with compatriot Dudek.

=== Heat details ===
Placing	Draw	Rider	Total	1	2	3	4	5	6	7	8	9	10	11	12	13	14	15	16	17	18	19	20	Pts	Pos	21	22	23
Gold	6	(Poland) (95) Bartosz Zmarzlik	18		3				3			1							3			3		13	1	2		3
Silver	15	(Slovakia) (54) Martin Vaculík	17				3			2			3						2	3				13	2		2	2
Bronze	13	(Denmark) (30) Leon Madsen	13				1	3							3		2					0		9	4	3		1
4	8	(Poland) (692) Patryk Dudek	12		1						3			3			1			1				9	5		3	0
5	10	(Russia) (89) Emil Sayfutdinov	13			3			2						2			3		2				12	3		1
6	3	(United Kingdom) (108) Tai Woffinden	9	2						0				2				2				2		8	7	1
7	5	(Russia) (222) Artem Laguta	9		2			2					2					1					2	9	6	0
8	1	(United Kingdom) (505) Robert Lambert	7	3				1				3				0				0				7	8		0
9	2	(Poland) (333) Janusz Kołodziej	7	1					0				1				3				2			7	9
10	12	(Denmark) (88) Niels-Kristian Iversen	7			2					2		2			0						1		7	10
11	11	(Australia) (69) Jason Doyle	6			0				3		0					0						3	6	11
12	9	(Slovenia) (55) Matej Žagar	6			1		0						1					1		3			6	12
13	7	(Sweden) (66) Fredrik Lindgren	5		0					1					0	3					1			5	13
14	16	(Poland) (71) Maciej Janowski	4				2				0	2						0			0			4	14
15	14	(Sweden) (85) Antonio Lindbäck	3				0		1					0		1							1	3	15
16	4	(Slovenia) (16) Matic Ivačič	2	0							1				1				0				0	2	16
Placing	Draw	Rider	Total	1	2	3	4	5	6	7	8	9	10	11	12	13	14	15	16	17	18	19	20	Pts	Pos	21	22	23

e: retired or mechanical failure • m: exclusion for exceeding two minute time allowance • t: exclusion for touching the tapes • x: other exclusion • f: fell
ns: non-starter • nc: non-classify
Semi-finals: Heat 21: Riders placed 1st, 4th, 6th & 7th in the intermediate classification (after 20 heats)
Heat 22: Riders placed 2nd, 3rd, 5th & 8th in the intermediate classification (after 20 heats)
Big Final (heat 23): The first and second placed riders in each of the Semi-Finals

gate A – inside	gate B	gate C	gate D – outside

== Intermediate classification ==
Qualifies for next season's Grand Prix series
Full-time Grand Prix rider
Wild card, track reserve or qualified reserve

Pos.	Rider	Points	POL (Poland)	SVN (Slovenia)	CZE (Czech Republic)	SWE (Sweden)	PL2 (Poland)	SCA (Sweden)	GER (Germany)	DEN (Denmark)	GBR (United Kingdom)	PL3 (Poland)
Gold	(Poland) (95) Bartosz Zmarzlik	28	10	18	–	–	–	–	–	–	–	–
Silver	(Poland) (692) Patryk Dudek	28	16	12	–	–	–	–	–	–	–	–
Bronze	(Denmark) (30) Leon Madsen	26	13	13	–	–	–	–	–	–	–	–
4	(Slovakia) (54) Martin Vaculík	24	7	17	–	–	–	–	–	–	–	–
5	(Denmark) (88) Niels-Kristian Iversen	21	14	7	–	–	–	–	–	–	–	–
6	(Sweden) (66) Fredrik Lindgren	20	15	5	–	–	–	–	–	–	–	–
7	(Russia) (89) Emil Sayfutdinov	19	6	13	–	–	–	–	–	–	–	–
8	(United Kingdom) (108) Tai Woffinden	15	6	9	–	–	–	–	–	–	–	–
9	(United Kingdom) (505) Robert Lambert	15	8	7	–	–	–	–	–	–	–	–
10	(Russia) (222) Artem Laguta	13	4	9	–	–	–	–	–	–	–	–
11	(Slovenia) (55) Matej Žagar	13	7	6	–	–	–	–	–	–	–	–
12	(Sweden) (85) Antonio Lindbäck	13	10	3	–	–	–	–	–	–	–	–
13	(Australia) (69) Jason Doyle	11	5	6	–	–	–	–	–	–	–	–
14	(Poland) (333) Janusz Kołodziej	11	4	7	–	–	–	–	–	–	–	–
15	(Poland) (16) Bartosz Smektała	10	10	–	–	–	–	–	–	–	–	–
16	(Poland) (71) Maciej Janowski	4	–	4	–	–	–	–	–	–	–	–
17	(Australia) (46) Max Fricke	3	3	–	–	–	–	–	–	–	–	–
18	(Slovenia) (16) Matic Ivačič	2	–	2	–	–	–	–	–	–	–	–
Pos.	Rider	Points	POL (Poland)	SVN (Slovenia)	CZE (Czech Republic)	SWE (Sweden)	PL2 (Poland)	SCA (Sweden)	GER (Germany)	DEN (Denmark)	GBR (United Kingdom)	PL3 (Poland)
