= 2019 Speedway Grand Prix of Czech Republic =

- 2019 Anlas Czech Republic FIM Speedway Grand Prix

Information
- Date: 14 June 2019
- City: (Czech Republic) Prague
- Event: 3 of 10
- Referee: (United Kingdom) Craig Ackroyd

Stadium details
- Stadium: Markéta Stadium
- Capacity: 10,000
- Length: 353 m (386 yd)

SGP Results
- Best Time
- (gold) Winner: (Poland) Janusz Kołodziej
- (silver) Runner-up: (Denmark) Leon Madsen
- (bronze) 3rd place: (Poland) Patryk Dudek

The 2019 Anlas Czech Republic FIM Speedway Grand Prix was the third race of the 2019 Speedway Grand Prix season. It took place on June 14 at the Markéta Stadium in Prague, Czech Republic.

== Riders ==
First reserve Robert Lambert replaced the injured world champion Tai Woffinden, while second reserve Max Fricke replaced Greg Hancock. The Speedway Grand Prix Commission nominated Václav Milík as the wild card, and Zdeněk Holub and Ondřej Smetana both as Track Reserves.

== Results ==
The Grand Prix was won by Janusz Kołodziej, who beat Leon Madsen, Patryk Dudek and Jason Doyle in the final. Max Fricke had initially top scored with 12 points in the qualifying heats, however he was eliminated at the semi-final stage.

Dudek, who was joint-first with Bartosz Zmarzlik heading into the Grand Prix, scored two points less than Madsen. The result meant that Dudek and Madsen were now tied for first place in the overall standings with 40 points.

=== Heat details ===
Placing	Draw	Rider	Total	1	2	3	4	5	6	7	8	9	10	11	12	13	14	15	16	17	18	19	20	Pts	Pos	21	22	23
Gold	8	(Poland) (333) Janusz Kołodziej	15		3						3			2			0			1				9	5		3	3
Silver	13	(Denmark) (30) Leon Madsen	14				3	1							2		2					1		9	7	3		2
Bronze	14	(Poland) (692) Patryk Dudek	12				1		2					3		1							2	9	8		2	1
4	12	(Australia) (69) Jason Doyle	12			3					0		2			2						3		10	4	2		0
5	11	(Australia) (46) Max Fricke	13			2				3		3					1						3	12	1	1
6	7	(Sweden) (66) Fredrik Lindgren	12		2					0					3	3					3			11	2		1
7	15	(Russia) (89) Emil Sayfutdinov	11				2			2			3						1	3				11	3		0
8	6	(Russia) (222) Artem Laguta	9		0				3			1							3			2		9	6	0
9	2	(Poland) (95) Bartosz Zmarzlik	8	2					1				0				3				2			8	9
10	10	(Poland) (71) Maciej Janowski	7			1			0						1			3		2				7	10
11	9	(United Kingdom) (505) Robert Lambert	6			0		2						1					2		1			6	11
12	4	(Czech Republic) (16) Václav Milík	4	3							1				0				0				0	4	12
13	16	(Slovakia) (54) Martin Vaculík	4				0				2	2						0			0			4	13
14	3	(Slovenia) (55) Matej Žagar	4	1						1				0				2				0		4	14
15	5	(Sweden) (85) Antonio Lindbäck	4		1			0					1					1					1	4	15
16	1	(Denmark) (88) Niels-Kristian Iversen	3	0				3				0				0				0				3	16
17	8	(Czech Republic) (17) Zdeněk Holub	0								0													0	w
Placing	Draw	Rider	Total	1	2	3	4	5	6	7	8	9	10	11	12	13	14	15	16	17	18	19	20	Pts	Pos	21	22	23

e: retired or mechanical failure • m: exclusion for exceeding two minute time allowance • t: exclusion for touching the tapes • x: other exclusion • f: fell
ns: non-starter • nc: non-classify
Semi-finals: Heat 21: Riders placed 1st, 4th, 6th & 7th in the intermediate classification (after 20 heats)
Heat 22: Riders placed 2nd, 3rd, 5th & 8th in the intermediate classification (after 20 heats)
Big Final (heat 23): The first and second placed riders in each of the Semi-Finals

gate A – inside	gate B	gate C	gate D – outside

== Intermediate classification ==
Qualifies for next season's Grand Prix series
Full-time Grand Prix rider
Wild card, track reserve or qualified reserve

Pos.	Rider	Points	POL (Poland)	SVN (Slovenia)	CZE (Czech Republic)	SWE (Sweden)	PL2 (Poland)	SCA (Sweden)	GER (Germany)	DEN (Denmark)	GBR (United Kingdom)	PL3 (Poland)
Gold	(Poland) (692) Patryk Dudek	40	16	12	12	–	–	–	–	–	–	–
Silver	(Denmark) (30) Leon Madsen	40	13	13	14	–	–	–	–	–	–	–
Bronze	(Poland) (95) Bartosz Zmarzlik	36	10	18	8	–	–	–	–	–	–	–
4	(Sweden) (66) Fredrik Lindgren	32	15	5	12	–	–	–	–	–	–	–
5	(Russia) (89) Emil Sayfutdinov	30	6	13	11	–	–	–	–	–	–	–
6	(Slovakia) (54) Martin Vaculík	28	7	17	4	–	–	–	–	–	–	–
7	(Poland) (333) Janusz Kołodziej	26	4	7	15	–	–	–	–	–	–	–
8	(Denmark) (88) Niels-Kristian Iversen	24	14	7	3	–	–	–	–	–	–	–
9	(Australia) (69) Jason Doyle	23	5	6	12	–	–	–	–	–	–	–
10	(Russia) (222) Artem Laguta	22	4	9	9	–	–	–	–	–	–	–
11	(United Kingdom) (505) Robert Lambert	21	8	7	6	–	–	–	–	–	–	–
12	(Slovenia) (55) Matej Žagar	17	7	6	4	–	–	–	–	–	–	–
13	(Sweden) (85) Antonio Lindbäck	17	10	3	4	–	–	–	–	–	–	–
14	(Australia) (46) Max Fricke	16	3	–	13	–	–	–	–	–	–	–
15	(United Kingdom) (108) Tai Woffinden	15	6	9	–	–	–	–	–	–	–	–
16	(Poland) (71) Maciej Janowski	11	–	4	7	–	–	–	–	–	–	–
17	(Poland) (16) Bartosz Smektała	10	10	–	–	–	–	–	–	–	–	–
18	(Czech Republic) (16) Václav Milík	4	–	–	4	–	–	–	–	–	–	–
19	(Slovenia) (16) Matic Ivačič	2	–	2	–	–	–	–	–	–	–	–
20	(Czech Republic) (17) Zdeněk Holub	0	–	–	0	–	–	–	–	–	–	–
Pos.	Rider	Points	POL (Poland)	SVN (Slovenia)	CZE (Czech Republic)	SWE (Sweden)	PL2 (Poland)	SCA (Sweden)	GER (Germany)	DEN (Denmark)	GBR (United Kingdom)	PL3 (Poland)
