= 2019 Speedway Grand Prix of Poland =

- 2019 BOLL Warsaw FIM Speedway Grand Prix of Poland

Information
- Date: 18 May 2019
- City: (Poland) Warsaw
- Event: 1 of 10
- Referee: (Sweden) Krister Gardell

Stadium details
- Stadium: Stadion Narodowy
- Capacity: 54,000
- Length: 274.2 m (299.9 yd)

SGP Results
- Best Time
- (gold) Winner: (Denmark) Leon Madsen
- (silver) Runner-up: (Sweden) Fredrik Lindgren
- (bronze) 3rd place: (Poland) Patryk Dudek

The 2019 BOLL Warsaw FIM Speedway Grand Prix of Poland was the first race of the 2019 Speedway Grand Prix season. It took place on May 18 at the Stadion Narodowy in Warsaw, Poland.

== Riders ==
First reserve Robert Lambert replaced the injured Maciej Janowski, while second reserve Max Fricke replaced Greg Hancock. The Speedway Grand Prix Commission nominated Bartosz Smektała as the wild card, and Dominik Kubera and Rafał Karczmarz both as Track Reserves.

== Results ==
The Grand Prix was won by Leon Madsen, who beat Fredrik Lindgren, Patryk Dudek and Niels-Kristian Iversen in the final. It was the Madsen's first ever Grand Prix win, on what was his first ever start as a regular member of the Grand Prix series.

Dudek had initially top scored with 13 points during the qualifying heats, and despite finishing third in the final, he topped the overall standings with 16 points, one ahead of Lindgren.

=== Heat details ===
Placing	Draw	Rider	Total	1	2	3	4	5	6	7	8	9	10	11	12	13	14	15	16	17	18	19	20	Pts	Pos	21	22	23
Gold	12	(Denmark) (30) Leon Madsen	13			1					1		2			2						2		8	8		2	3
Silver	7	(Sweden) (66) Fredrik Lindgren	15		1					3					1	3					2			10	4	3		2
Bronze	11	(Poland) (692) Patryk Dudek	16			3				1		3					3						3	13	1	2		1
4	8	(Denmark) (88) Niels-Kristian Iversen	14		2						3			3			0			3				11	2		3	0
5	6	(Poland) (16) Bartosz Smektała	10		3				0			1							3			3		10	3		0
6	16	(Poland) (95) Bartosz Zmarzlik	10				3				0	2						3			1			9	5		1
7	4	(Sweden) (85) Antonio Lindbäck	10	3							2				0				2				2	9	6	1
8	9	(United Kingdom) (505) Robert Lambert	8			0		2						2					1		3			8	7	0
9	10	(Slovakia) (54) Martin Vaculík	7			2			3						2			0		0				7	9
10	5	(Slovenia) (55) Matej Žagar	7		0			1					3					2					1	7	10
11	13	(Russia) (89) Emil Sayfutdinov	6				0	0							3		2					1		6	11
12	15	(United Kingdom) (108) Tai Woffinden	6				1			2			1						0	2				6	12
13	2	(Australia) (69) Jason Doyle	5	2					2				0				1				0			5	13
14	1	(Poland) (333) Janusz Kołodziej	4	0				3				0				0				1				4	14
15	14	(Russia) (222) Artem Laguta	4				2		1					0		1							0	4	15
16	3	(Australia) (46) Max Fricke	3	1						0				1				1				0		3	16
Placing	Draw	Rider	Total	1	2	3	4	5	6	7	8	9	10	11	12	13	14	15	16	17	18	19	20	Pts	Pos	21	22	23

e: retired or mechanical failure • m: exclusion for exceeding two minute time allowance • t: exclusion for touching the tapes • x: other exclusion • f: fell
ns: non-starter • nc: non-classify
Semi-finals: Heat 21: Riders placed 1st, 4th, 6th & 7th in the intermediate classification (after 20 heats)
Heat 22: Riders placed 2nd, 3rd, 5th & 8th in the intermediate classification (after 20 heats)
Big Final (heat 23): The first and second placed riders in each of the Semi-Finals

gate A – inside	gate B	gate C	gate D – outside

== Intermediate classification ==
Qualifies for next season's Grand Prix series
Full-time Grand Prix rider
Wild card, track reserve or qualified reserve

Pos.	Rider	Points	POL (Poland)	SVN (Slovenia)	CZE (Czech Republic)	SWE (Sweden)	PL2 (Poland)	SCA (Sweden)	GER (Germany)	DEN (Denmark)	GBR (United Kingdom)	PL3 (Poland)
Gold	(Poland) (692) Patryk Dudek	16	16	–	–	–	–	–	–	–	–	–
Silver	(Sweden) (66) Fredrik Lindgren	15	15	–	–	–	–	–	–	–	–	–
Bronze	(Denmark) (88) Niels-Kristian Iversen	14	14	–	–	–	–	–	–	–	–	–
4	(Denmark) (30) Leon Madsen	13	13	–	–	–	–	–	–	–	–	–
5	(Poland) (21) Bartosz Zmarzlik	10	10	–	–	–	–	–	–	–	–	–
6	(Sweden) (30) Antonio Lindbäck	10	10	–	–	–	–	–	–	–	–	–
7	(Poland) (21) Bartosz Smektała	10	10	–	–	–	–	–	–	–	–	–
8	(United Kingdom) (505) Robert Lambert	8	8	–	–	–	–	–	–	–	–	–
9	(Slovakia) (54) Martin Vaculík	7	7	–	–	–	–	–	–	–	–	–
10	(Slovenia) (55) Matej Žagar	7	7	–	–	–	–	–	–	–	–	–
11	(Russia) (89) Emil Sayfutdinov	6	6	–	–	–	–	–	–	–	–	–
12	(United Kingdom) (108) Tai Woffinden	6	6	–	–	–	–	–	–	–	–	–
13	(Australia) (69) Jason Doyle	5	5	–	–	–	–	–	–	–	–	–
14	(Poland) (333) Janusz Kołodziej	4	4	–	–	–	–	–	–	–	–	–
15	(Russia) (222) Artem Laguta	4	4	–	–	–	–	–	–	–	–	–
16	(Australia) (46) Max Fricke	3	3	–	–	–	–	–	–	–	–	–
Pos.	Rider	Points	POL (Poland)	SVN (Slovenia)	CZE (Czech Republic)	SWE (Sweden)	PL2 (Poland)	SCA (Sweden)	GER (Germany)	DEN (Denmark)	GBR (United Kingdom)	PL3 (Poland)
