= 2020 Speedway European Championship =

Motorcycle racing competition

Season details
- Dates: 4 July – 29 July
- Events: 5
- Cities: 5
- Countries: 1
- Riders: 15 permanents 1 wild card(s); 2 track reserves
- Heats: (in 5 events)

Winners
- Champion: GBR Robert Lambert
- Runner-up: DEN Leon Madsen
- 3rd place: RUS Grigory Laguta

The 2020 Speedway European Championship season was the eighth season of the Speedway European Championship (SEC) era, and the 20th UEM Individual Speedway European Championship. It was the seventh series under the promotion of One Sport Lts. of Poland.

Every round of the 2020 championship took place in Poland due to the global coronavirus pandemic. For the first time the winner of the series earned a spot in the 2021 Speedway Grand Prix series.

The title was won by Robert Lambert, who beat Leon Madsen by three points. The pair won all five rounds between them, with Madsen winning the first three before Lambert won the last two. Grigory Laguta took third place overall, while defending champion Mikkel Michelsen claimed fourth.

== Qualification ==
For the 2020 season, 15 permanent riders were joined at each SEC Final by one wildcard and two track reserves.

Defending champion, Mikkel Michelsen from Denmark was automatically invited to participate in all final events, while Grigory Laguta, Leon Madsen, Kacper Woryna and Bartosz Smektała secured their participation in all final events thanks to being in the top five of the general classification in the 2019 season. Due to the cancellation of the SEC Challenge, the rest of the line-up was completed by nominations from each of the national federations.

=== Qualified riders ===
#	Riders	2019 place	SEC Ch place	Appearance
155	(Denmark) Mikkel Michelsen	1		3rd
111	(Russia) Grigory Laguta	2		7th
30	(Denmark) Leon Madsen	3		5th
223	(Poland) Kacper Woryna	4		3rd
115	(Poland) Bartosz Smektała	5		2nd
52	(Denmark) Michael Jepsen Jensen	6		4th
110	(Denmark) Nicki Pedersen	7		7th
744	(Germany) Kai Huckenbeck	10		3rd
225	(Czech Republic) Václav Milík	12		6th
505	(United Kingdom) Robert Lambert	13		3rd
415	(France) David Bellego	14		2nd
98	(Finland) Timo Lahti	17		1st
91	(Russia) Andrey Kudriashov	21		2nd
507	(Poland) Krzysztof Kasprzak			5th
36	(Sweden) Peter Ljung			2nd

== Calendar ==
=== Championship Series ===
All five events in the final series took place in Poland due to the coronavirus pandemic.

Round	Date	City and venue	Winner	Runner-up	3rd placed	4th placed	Results
1	4 July	Toruń, Poland Rose Motoarena	(Denmark) Leon Madsen	(United Kingdom) Robert Lambert	(Denmark) Nicki Pedersen	(Poland) Bartosz Smektała	results
2	8 July	Bydgoszcz, Poland Polonia Bydgoszcz Stadium	(Denmark) Leon Madsen	(Denmark) Mikkel Michelsen	(Russia) Grigory Laguta	(Russia) Emil Sayfutdinov	results
3	22 July	Rybnik, Poland Rybnik Municipal Stadium	(Denmark) Leon Madsen	(Russia) Grigory Laguta	(Poland) Bartosz Zmarzlik	(Denmark) Nicki Pedersen	results
4	23 July	Gniezno, Poland Stadion Miejski	(United Kingdom) Robert Lambert	(Finland) Timo Lahti	(Russia) Grigory Laguta	(Poland) Krzysztof Kasprzak	results
5	29 July	Toruń, Poland Rose Motoarena	(United Kingdom) Robert Lambert	(Denmark) Leon Madsen	(Finland) Timo Lahti	(Germany) Kai Huckenbeck	results

== Final Classification ==
Pos.	Rider	Points	(Poland)	(Poland)	(Poland)	(Poland)	(Poland)
1	(United Kingdom) (505) Robert Lambert	67	14	10	12	17	14
2	(Denmark) (30) Leon Madsen	64	12	14	16	9	13
3	(Russia) (111) Grigory Laguta	52	7	13	13	11	8
4	(Denmark) (155) Mikkel Michelsen	46	10	13	7	8	8
5	(Poland) (115) Bartosz Smektała	45	11	7	8	9	10
6	(Denmark) (110) Nicki Pedersen	45	14	10	11	0	10
7	(Finland) (98) Timo Lahti	43	8	8	2	14	11
8	(Poland) (223) Kacper Woryna	33	8	4	7	5	9
9	(France) (415) David Bellego	31	6	6	10	6	3
10	(Czech Republic) (225) Václav Milík	26	6	6	5	6	3
11	(Poland) (16) Bartosz Zmarzlik	25	10	–	15	–	–
12	(Germany) (744) Kai Huckenbeck	25	3	3	4	3	12
13	(Poland) (507) Krzysztof Kasprzak	25	7	1	3	9	5
14	(Sweden) (36) Peter Ljung	23	1	5	6	6	5
15	(Denmark) (52) Michael Jepsen Jensen	22	3	4	4	7	4
16	(Russia) (191) Andrey Kudriashov	21	5	8	3	5	0
17	(Russia) (16) Emil Sayfutdinov	14	–	14	–	–	–
18	(Poland) (16) Paweł Przedpełski	10	–	–	–	–	10
19	(Poland) (16) Patryk Dudek	8	–	–	–	8	–
20	(Poland) (17) Oskar Fajfer	3	–	–	–	3	–
21	(Poland) (17) Igor Kopeć-Sobczyński	1	1	–	–	–	0
22	(Poland) (18) Norbert Krakowiak	1	–	–	–	0	1
23	(Poland) (18) Kamil Brzozowski	0	0	–	–	–	–
24	(Russia) (17) Sergey Logachev	0	–	–	0	–	–
25	(Poland) (18) Adrian Gała	0	–	–	–	0	–

== See also ==
- 2020 Speedway Grand Prix
