= 2019 Speedway European Championship =

Motorcycle racing competition

Season details
- Dates: 13 July – 28 September
- Events: 4
- Cities: 4
- Countries: 3
- Riders: 15 permanents 1 wild card(s); 2 track reserves
- Heats: (in 4 events)

Winners
- Champion: DEN Mikkel Michelsen
- Runner-up: RUS Grigory Laguta
- 3rd place: DEN Leon Madsen

The 2019 Speedway European Championship season was the seventh season of the Speedway European Championship (SEC) era, and the 19th UEM Individual Speedway European Championship. It was the sixth series under the promotion of One Sport Lts. of Poland.

The championship was won by Mikkel Michelsen, who beat Grigory Laguta in a run-off after both riders had finished the series tied on 45 points. Defending champion Leon Madsen, who missed one round through injury, also won a run-off with Kacper Woryna to finish third, while Bartosz Smektała completed the top five.

== Qualification ==
For the 2019 season, 15 permanent riders were joined at each SEC Final by one wildcard and two track reserves.

Defending champion, Leon Madsen from Denmark was automatically invited to participate in all final events, while Jarosław Hampel, Robert Lambert, Antonio Lindbäck and Mikkel Michelsen secured their participation in all final events thanks to being in the top five of the general classification in the 2018 season.

Five riders qualified through the SEC Challenge, while Nicki Pedersen, Anders Thomsen, Kai Huckenbeck, Paweł Przedpełski and Bartosz Smektała were named as series wildcards.

=== Qualified riders ===
#	Riders	2018 place	SEC Ch place	Appearance
	(Denmark) Leon Madsen	1		4th
	(Poland) Jarosław Hampel	2		2nd
	(United Kingdom) Robert Lambert	3		2nd
	(Sweden) Antonio Lindbäck	4		4th
	(Denmark) Mikkel Michelsen	5		2nd
	(Russia) Grigory Laguta		1	6th
	(France) David Bellego		2	1st
	(Czech Republic) Václav Milík	7	3	5th
	(Denmark) Michael Jepsen Jensen		4	3rd
	(Poland) Kacper Woryna		5	2nd
	(Germany) Kai Huckenbeck	9		2nd
	(Denmark) Anders Thomsen		6	2nd
	(Poland) Paweł Przedpełski		7	2nd
	(Poland) Bartosz Smektała		10	1st
	(Denmark) Nicki Pedersen			6th

== Calendar ==
=== Qualification ===
The calendar for qualification consisted of 3 Semi-final events and one SEC Challenge event.

Round	Date	City and venue	Winner	Runner-up	3rd placed	4th placed	Results
SEC Challenge	25 May	Nagyhalász, Hungary Nagyhalász Speedway Ring	(Russia) Grigory Laguta	(France) David Bellego	(Czech Republic) Václav Milík	(Denmark) Michael Jepsen Jensen	results

=== Championship Series ===
A four-event calendar was scheduled for the final series, with events in Germany, Poland and Denmark.

Round	Date	City and venue	Winner	Runner-up	3rd placed	4th placed	Results
1	13 July	Güstrow, Germany Stadion Güstrow	(Russia) Grigory Laguta	(Denmark) Leon Madsen	(Poland) Bartosz Smektała	(Sweden) Antonio Lindbäck	results
2	27 July	Toruń, Poland Rose Motoarena	(Denmark) Leon Madsen	(Russia) Grigory Laguta	(Poland) Kacper Woryna	(Denmark) Nicki Pedersen	results
3	10 August	Vojens, Denmark Vojens Speedway Center	(Denmark) Mikkel Michelsen	(Poland) Kacper Woryna	(Denmark) Nicki Pedersen	(Denmark) Michael Jepsen Jensen	results
4	28 September	Chorzów, Poland Silesian Stadium	(Denmark) Mikkel Michelsen	(Denmark) Leon Madsen	(Poland) Paweł Przedpełski	(Poland) Kacper Woryna	results

== Final Classification ==
Pos.	Rider	Points	(Germany)	(Poland)	(Denmark)	(Poland)
1	(Denmark) (155) Mikkel Michelsen	45	7	8	15	15
2	(Russia) (111) Grigory Laguta	45	15	12	7	11
3	(Denmark) (30) Leon Madsen	39	11	15	–	13
4	(Poland) (223) Kacper Woryna	39	8	10	11	10
5	(Poland) (115) Bartosz Smektała	36	12	7	10	7
6	(Denmark) (52) Michael Jepsen Jensen	35	10	6	11	8
7	(Denmark) (110) Nicki Pedersen	33	8	11	14	–
8	(Poland) (323) Paweł Przedpełski	27	3	8	2	14
9	(Poland) (33) Jarosław Hampel	25	7	8	4	6
10	(Germany) (744) Kai Huckenbeck	24	9	5	8	2
11	(Sweden) (85) Antonio Lindbäck	23	11	2	1	9
12	(Czech Republic) (225) Václav Milík	22	8	4	5	5
13	(United Kingdom) (505) Robert Lambert	18	4	8	–	6
14	(France) (415) David Bellego	14	8	4	–	2
15	(Denmark) (11) Anders Thomsen	14	3	3	–	8
16	(Poland) (16) Adrian Miedziński	9	–	9	–	–
17	(Finland) (98) Timo Lahti	9	–	–	9	–
18	(Latvia) (29) Andžejs Ļebedevs	8	–	–	8	–
19	(Denmark) (17) Andreas Lyager	7	–	–	7	–
20	(Denmark) (18) Frederik Jakobsen	7	–	–	7	–
21	(Russia) (191) Andrey Kudriashov	6	–	–	6	–
22	(Poland) (16) Maksym Drabik	6	–	–	–	6
23	(Poland) (17) Jakub Miśkowiak	5	–	5	–	–
24	(Denmark) (16) Peter Kildemand	3	–	–	3	–
25	(Germany) (16) Kevin Wölbert	2	2	–	–	–
26	(Poland) (18) Igor Kopeć-Sobczyński	0	–	0	–	–

== See also ==
- 2019 Speedway Grand Prix
