= 2019 Speedway Grand Prix Qualification =

Series of speedway races

The 2019 Individual Speedway World Championship Grand Prix Qualification was a series of motorcycle speedway meetings that were used to determine the three riders that qualified for the 2019 Speedway Grand Prix. The series consisted of four qualifying rounds at Žarnovica, Slangerup, Lonigo and Abensberg and the Grand Prix Challenge at Landshut. The three riders that qualified were Janusz Kołodziej, Niels-Kristian Iversen and Antonio Lindbäck.

== Qualifying rounds ==
=== Round one ===
- 19 May 2018
- (Slovakia) Žarnovica

Pos.	Rider	Points	Details
1	(Slovenia) Matej Žagar	14+3	(3,2,3,3,3)
2	(Sweden) Antonio Lindbäck	14+2	(3,3,2,3,3)
3	(Poland) Janusz Kołodziej	13	(3,3,3,1,3)
4	(Poland) Jarosław Hampel	12	(3,2,3,2,2)
5	(Czech Republic) Eduard Krčmář	10	(2,2,3,2,1)
6	(Denmark) Michael Jepsen Jensen	10	(2,3,1,2,2)
7	(Russia) Gleb Chugunov	8	(2,2,2,0,2)
8	(Latvia) Andžejs Ļebedevs	7	(0,1,2,1,3)
9	(Croatia) Jurica Pavlic	7	(1,0,2,3,1)
10	(Czech Republic) Josef Franc	7	(2,1,1,3,0)
11	(Slovenia) Matic Ivačič	5	(1,3,1,0,0)
12	(Russia) Andrey Kudryashov	5	(1,1,0,2,1)
13	(United States) Ricky Wells	5	(1,1,0,2,1)
14	(Hungary) Norbert Magosi	2	(W,0,1,0,1)
15	(Slovakia) David Pacalaj	1	(0,0,0,1,0)
16	(Slovakia) Jan Mihalik	0	(0,0,0,0,D)
17	(Bulgaria) Milan Manev	0	(0,-,-,-,-)
	(Slovakia) Jakub Valković	DNS	

=== Round three ===
- 19 May 2018
- (Italy) Lonigo

Pos.	Rider	Points	Details
1	(Denmark) Kenneth Bjerre	13	(3,3,2,2,3)
2	(France) David Bellego	12+3	(2,2,3,3,2)
3	(Germany) Kevin Wölbert	12+2	(3,3,2,2,2)
4	(United Kingdom) Chris Harris	12+1	(3,2,2,3,2)
5	(Czech Republic) Václav Milík	10	(0,3,1,3,3)
6	(Sweden) Andreas Jonsson	10	(1,2,3,1,3)
7	(Sweden) Linus Sundström	9	(1,2,3,1,3)
8	(Poland) Bartosz Smektała	8	(1,2,3,D,3)
9	(Australia) Rohan Tungate	8	(3,1,0,2,2)
10	(Italy) Nicolas Covatti	7	(2,3,1,W,1)
11	(Italy) Daniele Tessari	5	(2,1,0,1,1)
12	(Finland) Tero Aarnio	5	(1,1,1,2,D)
13	(Latvia) Davis Kurmis	3	(0,0,2,0,1)
14	(Slovenia) Denis Štojs	2	(0,0,1,1,0)
15	(France) Mathieu Trésarrieu	2	(1,0,D,1,W)
16	(Hungary) Rolando Benko	0	(0,D,0,D,-)
17	(Italy) Alessandro Milanese	0	(-,-,-,0,0)

=== Round two ===
- 19 May 2018
- (Denmark) Slangerup

Pos.	Rider	Points	Details
1	(Poland) Krzysztof Kasprzak	13	(3,1,3,3,3)
2	(Australia) Jack Holder	12	(3,3,2,2,2)
3	(Denmark) Niels-Kristian Iversen	11	(3,2,2,1,3)
4	(United Kingdom) Robert Lambert	10	(2,3,3,0,2)
5	(Australia) Brady Kurtz	10	(1,1,2,3,3)
6	(Finland) Timo Lahti	10	(3,3,1,2,1)
7	(Sweden) Jacob Thorssell	8	(2,3,3,0,U)
8	(Denmark) Mikkel Michelsen	8	(2,1,0,3,2)
9	(Sweden) Kim Nilsson	7	(0,2,1,3,1)
10	(Norway) Lasse Fredriksen	7	(0,2,2,1,2)
11	(United Kingdom) Dan Bewley	6	(W,0,1,2,3)
12	(Denmark) Anders Thomsen	4	(-,-,3,-,1)
13	(Latvia) Jevgeņijs Kostigovs	4	(1,2,0,1,0)
14	(Finland) Jesse Mustonen	4	(2,0,0,1,1)
15	(Denmark) Andreas Lyager	3	(1,-,-,2,-)
16	(Norway) Glenn Moi	2	(0,1,1,0,0)
17	(New Zealand) Bradley Wilson-Dean	1	(1,W,-,-,-)
18	(Ukraine) Vitali Lysak	0	(0,0,0,0,U)

=== Round four ===
- 21 May 2018
- (Germany) Abensberg

Pos.	Rider	Points	Details
1	(United Kingdom) Craig Cook	14	(2,3,3,3,3)
2	(Denmark) Hans Andersen	13	(3,3,1,3,3)
3	(Australia) Max Fricke	12	(3,3,3,1,2)
4	(Poland) Piotr Pawlicki Jr.	11	(3,3,3,2,T)
5	(Poland) Krzysztof Buczkowski	11	(2,2,2,2,3)
6	(Germany) Martin Smolinski	10	(2,1,3,2,2)
7	(Sweden) Peter Ljung	8	(2,2,1,3,0)
8	(Germany) Max Dilger	7	(1,0,2,3,1)
9	(Russia) Vadim Tarasenko	6	(3,1,2,D,T)
10	(Denmark) Peter Kildemand	6	(0,2,0,2,2)
11	(United Kingdom) Kyle Howarth	6	(1,1,2,1,1)
12	(Germany) Mark Riss	4	(-,-,1,3,0)
13	(Czech Republic) Matěj Kůs	4	(1,2,0,0,1)
14	(Italy) Michele Paco Castagna	3	(0,1,0,1,1)
15	(Germany) Valentin Grobauer	2	(-,-,-,D,2)
16	(Czech Republic) Zdeněk Simota	2	(1,0,1,0,D)
17	(Austria) Mike Jacopetti	1	(0,0,0,1,0)
18	(France) Dimitri Bergé	0	(W,D,-,-,-)

== 2018 Speedway Grand Prix Challenge ==
=== Grand Prix Challenge ===
- 28 July 2018
- (Germany) Landshut
- Lambert, Pawlicki, Smolinski and Milík were nominated as wildcards.

Pos.	Rider	Points	Details
1	(Poland) Janusz Kołodziej	12	(3,3,3,1,2)
2	(Denmark) Niels-Kristian Iversen	11	(3,2,3,3,0)
3	(Sweden) Antonio Lindbäck	10+3	(2,D,2,3,3)
4	(United Kingdom) Craig Cook	10+2	(0,3,2,2,3)
5	(United Kingdom) Robert Lambert	9	(0,2,1,3,3)
6	(Poland) Piotr Pawlicki Jr.	9	(2,3,2,1,1)
7	(Australia) Max Fricke	8	(3,0,3,2,D)
8	(Germany) Martin Smolinski	8	(3,1,1,0,3)
9	(Australia) Jack Holder	8	(1,1,3,1,2)
10	(Denmark) Kenneth Bjerre	7	(2,1,0,3,1)
11	(Czech Republic) Václav Milík	7	(1,3,1,0,2)
12	(France) David Bellego	7	(1,2,0,2,2)
13	(Denmark) Hans Andersen	6	(1,1,1,2,1)
14	(Germany) Kevin Wölbert	5	(0,2,2,0,1)
15	(Slovenia) Matej Žagar	2	(2,W,-,-,-)
16	(Germany) Max Dilger	1	(-,-,-,1,0)
17	(Poland) Krzysztof Kasprzak	0	(0,D,D,-,-)
18	(Germany) Valentin Grobauer	0	(-,-,0,0,0)

== See also ==
- 2018 Speedway Grand Prix
