= 2017 Speedway European Championship =

Motorcycle racing competition

Season details
- Dates: 30 June – 14 October
- Events: 4
- Cities: 4
- Countries: 3
- Riders: 15 permanents 1 wild card(s); 2 track reserves
- Heats: (in 4 events)

Winners
- Champion: LVA Andžejs Ļebedevs
- Runner-up: RUS Artem Laguta
- 3rd place: CZE Václav Milík

The 2017 Speedway European Championship season was the fifth season of the Speedway European Championship (SEC) era, and the 17th UEM Individual Speedway European Championship. It was the fifth series under the promotion of One Sport Lts. of Poland.

The championship was won by Andžejs Ļebedevs, who claimed the title for the first time. Despite not winning a round, he finished in second place three times, leaving him seven points clear of Russia's Artem Laguta in the final standings. Last year's runner-up Václav Milík finished third, while Krzysztof Kasprzak and Andreas Jonsson secured the final spots in the 2018 line-up by finishing forth and fifth respectively.

== Qualification ==
For the 2017 season, 15 permanent riders were joined at each SEC Final by one wild card and two track reserves.

Defending champion, Nicki Pedersen from Denmark was automatically invited to participate in all final events. Václav Milík, Krzysztof Kasprzak, Grigory Laguta and Leon Madsen secured their participation in all final events thanks to being in the top five of the general classification in the 2016 season.

Seven riders qualified through the SEC Challenge and the line-up was then completed when Artem Laguta, Andreas Jonsson and Andžejs Ļebedevs received and accepted wild cards to compete.

=== Qualified riders ===
#	Riders	2016 place	SEC Ch place	Appearance
	(Denmark) Nicki Pedersen	1		5th
	(Czech Republic) Václav Milík	2		3rd
	(Poland) Krzysztof Kasprzak	3		3rd
	(Russia) Grigory Laguta	4		5th
	(Denmark) Leon Madsen	5		2nd
	(Poland) Przemysław Pawlicki	8	1	3rd
	(Denmark) Kenneth Bjerre		2	1st
	(Denmark) Nicolai Klindt		3	1st
	(Poland) Mateusz Szczepaniak		4	2nd
	(Germany) Martin Smolinski		5	3rd
	(Poland) Kacper Gomólski		6	1st
	(Poland) Adrian Miedziński		7	1st
	(Russia) Artem Laguta			2nd
	(Sweden) Andreas Jonsson			2nd
	(Latvia) Andžejs Ļebedevs		13	3rd

== Calendar ==
=== Qualification ===
The calendar for qualification consisted of 3 Semi-final events and one SEC Challenge event.

Round	Date	City and venue	Winner	Runner-up	3rd placed	4th placed	Results
Semifinal 1	29 April	Nagyhalász, Hungary Nagyhalász Speedway Ring	(Poland) Przemysław Pawlicki	(Denmark) Mikkel Bech	(Ukraine) Andriy Karpov	(Poland) Janusz Kołodziej	results
Semifinal 2	29 April	Mureck, Austria Speedway Stadium	(Latvia) Andžejs Ļebedevs	(Denmark) Michael Jepsen Jensen	(Poland) Adrian Miedziński	(Poland) Kacper Gomólski	results
Semifinal 3	29 April	Terenzano, Italy Moto Club Olimpia	(Finland) Timo Lahti	(Germany) Martin Smolinski	(Denmark) Kenneth Bjerre	(Russia) Andrey Kudryashov	results
Semifinal 4	6 May	(France) Lamothe-Landerron, [[]] Speedway Stadium	(Sweden) Kim Nilsson	(Poland) Mateusz Szczepaniak	(Denmark) Nicolai Klindt	(France) David Bellego	results
SEC Challenge	20 May	Goričan, Croatia Stadium Millenium	(Poland) Przemysław Pawlicki	(Denmark) Kenneth Bjerre	(Denmark) Nicolai Klindt	(Poland) Mateusz Szczepaniak	results

=== Championship Series ===
A four-event calendar was scheduled for the final series, with events in Poland, Germany and Sweden.

Round	Date	City and venue	Winner	Runner-up	3rd placed	4th placed	Results
1	30 June	Toruń, Poland MotoArena Toruń	(Poland) Jarosław Hampel	(Czech Republic) Václav Milík Jr.	(Latvia) Andžejs Ļebedevs	(Poland) Przemysław Pawlicki	results
2	15 July	Güstrow, Germany Stadion Güstrow	(Russia) Artem Laguta	(Latvia) Andžejs Ļebedevs	(Poland) Krzysztof Kasprzak	(Czech Republic) Václav Milík Jr.	results
3	5 August	Hallstavik, Sweden HZ Bygg Arena	(Czech Republic) Václav Milík Jr.	(Latvia) Andžejs Ļebedevs	(Sweden) Andreas Jonsson	(Sweden) Jacob Thorssell	results
4	14 October	Lublin, Poland Mosir Bystrzyca	(Poland) Krzysztof Kasprzak	(Latvia) Andžejs Ļebedevs	(Russia) Artem Laguta	(Poland) Przemysław Pawlicki	results

== Classification ==
Pos.	Rider	Points	(Poland)	(Germany)	(Sweden)	(Poland)
1	(Latvia) (129) Andžejs Ļebedevs	52	11	14	13	14
2	(Russia) (2) Artem Laguta	45	8	15	9	13
3	(Czech Republic) (13) Václav Milík	44	12	9	13	10
4	(Poland) (507) Krzysztof Kasprzak	39	9	11	6	13
5	(Sweden) (100) Andreas Jonsson	39	10	8	14	7
6	(Poland) (59) Przemysław Pawlicki	34	10	7	6	11
7	(Poland) (58) Mateusz Szczepaniak	29	9	10	5	5
8	(Denmark) (91) Kenneth Bjerre	28	8	4	5	11
9	(Russia) (9) Andrey Kudryashov	26	7	9	3	7
10	(Denmark) (52) Michael Jepsen Jensen	24	–	9	8	7
11	(Germany) (84) Martin Smolinski	20	2	3	7	8
12	(Poland) (44) Kacper Gomólski	20	6	5	8	1
13	(Denmark) (66) Leon Madsen	20	5	3	5	7
14	(Poland) (16) Jarosław Hampel	14	14	–	–	–
15	(Denmark) (177) Mikkel Bech	13	2	2	5	4
16	(Germany) (16) Kai Huckenbeck	12	–	12	–	–
17	(Sweden) (15) Jacob Thorssell	10	–	–	10	–
18	(Russia) (7) Grigory Laguta	9	9	–	–	–
18	(Sweden) (16) Pontus Aspgren	9	–	–	9	–
20	(Poland) (16) Daniel Jeleniewski	7	–	–	–	7
21	(Denmark) (29) Nicolai Klindt	5	0	5	–	–
22	(Poland) (17) Paweł Przedpełski	2	2	–	–	–
23	(Poland) (18) Szymon Woźniak	2	2	–	–	–

== See also ==
- 2017 Speedway Grand Prix
