= 2018 Speedway European Championship =

Motorcycle racing competition

Season details
- Dates: 23 June – 15 September
- Events: 4
- Cities: 4
- Countries: 3
- Riders: 15 permanents 1 wild card(s); 2 track reserves
- Heats: (in 4 events)

Winners
- Champion: DEN Leon Madsen
- Runner-up: POL Jarosław Hampel
- 3rd place: GBR Robert Lambert

The 2018 Speedway European Championship season was the sixth season of the Speedway European Championship (SEC) era, and the 18th UEM Individual Speedway European Championship. It was the fifth series under the promotion of One Sport Lts. of Poland.

The championship was won by Denmark's Leon Madsen, who finished 11 points ahead of Jarosław Hampel in second. Madsen won the last two rounds of the series, scoring a full 15-point maximum in the final round. Robert Lambert finished third overall, with Antonio Lindbäck and Mikkel Michelsen completing the top five.

== Qualification ==
For the 2018 season, 15 permanent riders were joined at each SEC Final by one wildcard and two track reserves.

Defending champion, Andžejs Ļebedevs from Latvia was automatically invited to participate in all final events, while Václav Milík, Krzysztof Kasprzak and Andreas Jonsson secured their participation in all final events thanks to being in the top five of the general classification in the 2017 season. Artem Laguta, who finished second in 2017, declined his invite, meaning an extra wildcard was announced.

Five riders qualified through the SEC Challenge, while Leon Madsen, Jarosław Hampel, Piotr Pawlicki Jr., Antonio Lindbäck, Kai Huckenbeck and Robert Lambert were named as series wildcards.

=== Qualified riders ===
#	Riders	2017 place	SEC Ch place	Appearance
	(Latvia) Andžejs Ļebedevs	1		4th
	(Czech Republic) Václav Milík	3		4th
	(Poland) Krzysztof Kasprzak	4		4th
	(Sweden) Andreas Jonsson	5		3rd
	(Russia) Emil Sayfutdinov		1	5th
	(Denmark) Mikkel Michelsen		2	1st
	(Czech Republic) Josef Franc		3	1st
	(Russia) Andrey Kudryashov	9	4	1st
	(Denmark) Peter Kildemand		5	3rd
	(Denmark) Leon Madsen	13		3rd
	(Poland) Jarosław Hampel	14		1st
	(Poland) Piotr Pawlicki Jr.			1st
	(Sweden) Antonio Lindbäck		8	3rd
	(Germany) Kai Huckenbeck	16	6	1st
	(United Kingdom) Robert Lambert			1st

== Calendar ==
=== Qualification ===
The calendar for qualification consisted of 3 Semi-final events and one SEC Challenge event.

Round	Date	City and venue	Winner	Runner-up	3rd placed	4th placed	Results
SEC Challenge	5 May	Terenzano, Italy Moto Club Olimpia	(Russia) Emil Sayfutdinov	(Denmark) Mikkel Michelsen	(Czech Republic) Josef Franc	(Russia) Andrey Kudryashov	results

=== Championship Series ===
A four-event calendar was scheduled for the final series, with events in Poland, Germany and Latvia.

Round	Date	City and venue	Winner	Runner-up	3rd placed	4th placed	Results
1	23 June	Gniezno, Poland Stadion Miejski	(Poland) Jarosław Hampel	(Sweden) Antonio Lindbäck	(Germany) Kai Huckenbeck	(Denmark) Mikkel Michelsen	results
2	14 July	Güstrow, Germany Stadion Güstrow	(United Kingdom) Robert Lambert	(Denmark) Leon Madsen	(Denmark) Mikkel Michelsen	(Russia) Emil Sayfutdinov	results
3	18 August	Daugavpils, Latvia Spīdveja centrs	(Denmark) Leon Madsen	(Russia) Emil Sayfutdinov	(United Kingdom) Robert Lambert	(Czech Republic) Václav Milík	results
4	15 September	Chorzów, Poland Silesian Stadium	(Denmark) Leon Madsen	(Sweden) Antonio Lindbäck	(Poland) Kacper Woryna	(Poland) Jarosław Hampel	results

== Classification ==
Pos.	Rider	Points	(Poland)	(Germany)	(Latvia)	(Poland)
1	(Denmark) (66) Leon Madsen	56	8	14	16	18
2	(Poland) (33) Jarosław Hampel	45	17	8	9	11
3	(United Kingdom) (505) Robert Lambert	41	6	14	13	8
4	(Sweden) (85) Antonio Lindbäck	40	13	4	11	12
5	(Denmark) (155) Mikkel Michelsen	40	9	11	8	12
6	(Russia) (89) Emil Sayfutdinov	39	6	11	13	9
7	(Czech Republic) (225) Václav Milík	32	8	8	10	6
8	(Denmark) (25) Peter Kildemand	32	8	10	7	7
9	(Germany) (744) Kai Huckenbeck	26	11	9	6	0
10	(Russia) (91) Andrey Kudryashov	26	5	8	8	5
11	(Poland) (507) Krzysztof Kasprzak	24	8	6	3	7
12	(Poland) (777) Piotr Pawlicki Jr.	20	9	3	–	8
13	(Latvia) (29) Andžejs Ļebedevs	20	5	5	7	3
14	(Sweden) (100) Andreas Jonsson	19	7	6	6	0
15	(Poland) (16) Kacper Woryna	13	–	–	–	13
16	(Germany) (16) Kevin Wölbert	8	–	8	–	–
17	(Poland) (16) Adrian Gała	5	5	–	–	–
18	(Ukraine) (19) Oleksandr Loktaev	4	–	–	4	–
19	(Latvia) (16) Oļegs Mihailovs	4	–	–	4	–
20	(Czech Republic) (444) Josef Franc	4	0	0	1	3
21	(Poland) (18) Jakub Miśkowiak	3	–	–	–	3
22	(Poland) (17) Robert Chmiel	1	1	–	–	–
23	(Poland) (18) Norbert Krakowiak	1	1	–	–	–
24	(Germany) (17) Max Dilger	1	–	1	–	–
25	(Poland) (17) Rafał Karczmarz	1	–	–	–	1

== See also ==
- 2018 Speedway Grand Prix
