= 2019 Speedway Grand Prix =

World Championship motorcycle speedway season

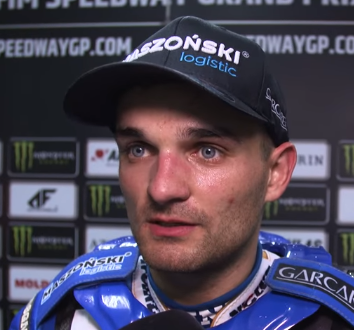
- Zmarzlik after winning the Slovenian Grand Prix

Season details
- Dates: 18 May – 5 October
- Events: 10
- Cities: 10
- Countries: 7
- Riders: 15 permanents 1 wild card(s); 2 track reserves
- Heats: 230 (in 10 events)

Winners
- Champion: POL Bartosz Zmarzlik
- Runner-up: DEN Leon Madsen
- 3rd place: RUS Emil Sayfutdinov

The 2019 Speedway Grand Prix season was the 25th season of the Speedway Grand Prix era, and decided the 74th FIM Speedway World Championship. It was the nineteenth series under the promotion of Benfield Sports International, an IMG company.

The title was won by Bartosz Zmarzlik, who beat debutant Leon Madsen by two points with Russia's Emil Sayfutdinov finishing third. Zmarzlik became the third Polish world champion after Jerzy Szczakiel won in 1973 and Tomasz Gollob took the title in 2010. Defending champion Tai Woffinden's season was hampered by injury and he finished in 13th place.

== 2019 changes ==
Qualifying for each Grand Prix was introduced for the first time in the 2019 season. On the day before the Grand Prix every rider completed a timed lap, with the fastest rider getting to select their position in the draw, followed by second and so on. Matej Žagar was the first ever rider to win a qualifying session when setting the fastest time at the 2019 Speedway Grand Prix of Poland.

== Qualification ==
For the 2019 season there were 15 permanent riders, joined at each Grand Prix by one wild card and two track reserves.

The top eight riders from the 2018 championship qualified automatically. These riders were joined by the three riders who qualified via the Grand Prix Challenge.

The final four riders were nominated by series promoters, Benfield Sports International, following the completion of the 2018 season.

On 2 May Greg Hancock announced he would not be competing in the 2019 season to support his wife's battle with cancer. The FIM and BSI unanimously supported Hancock's withdrawal.

=== Qualified riders ===
#	Riders	2018 place	GP Ch place	Appearance	Previous appearances in series
108	(United Kingdom) Tai Woffinden	1	—	8th	2010, 2011, 2013–2018
95	(Poland) Bartosz Zmarzlik	2	—	4th	2012–2015, 2016–2018
66	(Sweden) Fredrik Lindgren	3	—	10th	2004, 2006–2007, 2008–2014, 2016, 2017–2018
71	(Poland) Maciej Janowski	4	—	5th	2008, 2012, 2014, 2015–2018
45	(United States) Greg Hancock	5	—	25th	1995–2018
222	(Russia) Artem Laguta	6	—	3rd	2011, 2018
69	(Australia) Jason Doyle	7	—	5th	2015–2018
89	(Russia) Emil Sayfutdinov	8	—	8th	2009–2013, 2017–2018
692	(Poland) Patryk Dudek	9	—	3rd	2016, 2017–2018
55	(Slovenia) Matej Žagar	10	15	9th	2003–2005, 2006–2007, 2008–2009, 2011, 2013–2018
54	(Slovakia) Martin Vaculík	13	—	4th	2012, 2013, 2017–2018
333	(Poland) Janusz Kołodziej	—	1	2nd	2006, 2010, 2011
88	(Denmark) Niels-Kristian Iversen	14	2	8th	2004–2005, 2006, 2008, 2009–2010, 2013–2017, 2018
85	(Sweden) Antonio Lindbäck	—	3	9th	2004, 2005–2007, 2009–2010, 2011–2013, 2015, 2016–2017
30	(Denmark) Leon Madsen	—	—	1st	2013

=== Qualified substitutes ===
The following riders were nominated as substitutes:

#	Riders	2018 place	GP Ch place
505	(United Kingdom) Robert Lambert	30	5
46	(Australia) Max Fricke	18	7
155	(Denmark) Mikkel Michelsen	29	—
225	(Czech Republic) Václav Milík Jr.	17	11
115	(Poland) Bartosz Smektała	26	—

== Calendar ==
The 2019 season consisted of 10 events, the same number as in 2018.

Round	Date	City and venue	Winner	Runner-up	3rd placed	4th placed	Results
1	18 May	(Poland) Warsaw, Poland; Stadion Narodowy	(Denmark) Leon Madsen	(Sweden) Fredrik Lindgren	(Poland) Patryk Dudek	(Denmark) Niels-Kristian Iversen	results
2	1 June	(Slovenia) Krško, Slovenia; Stadion Matije Gubca	(Poland) Bartosz Zmarzlik	(Slovakia) Martin Vaculík	(Denmark) Leon Madsen	(Poland) Patryk Dudek	results
3	15 June	(Czech Republic) Prague, Czech Republic; Markéta Stadium	(Poland) Janusz Kołodziej	(Denmark) Leon Madsen	(Poland) Patryk Dudek	(Australia) Jason Doyle	results
4	6 July	(Sweden) Hallstavik, Sweden; HZ Bygg Arena	(Russia) Emil Sayfutdinov	(Slovakia) Martin Vaculík	(Poland) Maciej Janowski	(Australia) Max Fricke	results
5	3 August	Wrocław, Poland; Olympic Stadium	(Poland) Bartosz Zmarzlik	(Slovakia) Martin Vaculík	(Denmark) Leon Madsen	(Poland) Janusz Kołodziej	results
6	17 August	Målilla, Sweden; G&B Arena	(Sweden) Fredrik Lindgren	(Denmark) Leon Madsen	(Poland) Maciej Janowski	(Russia) Artem Laguta	results
7	31 August	(Germany) Teterow, Germany; Bergring Arena	(Poland) Maciej Janowski	(Poland) Bartosz Zmarzlik	(Slovenia) Matej Žagar	(Denmark) Niels-Kristian Iversen	results
8	7 September	(Denmark) Vojens, Denmark; Vojens Speedway Center	(Poland) Bartosz Zmarzlik	(Slovenia) Matej Žagar	(Sweden) Fredrik Lindgren	(Russia) Emil Sayfutdinov	results
9	21 September	(United Kingdom) Cardiff, Great Britain; Principality Stadium	(Denmark) Leon Madsen	(Russia) Emil Sayfutdinov	(Poland) Bartosz Zmarzlik	(Australia) Jason Doyle	results
10	5 October	Toruń, Poland; Rose Motoarena	(Denmark) Leon Madsen	(Russia) Emil Sayfutdinov	(Denmark) Niels-Kristian Iversen	(Poland) Bartosz Zmarzlik	results

== Final Classification ==
Qualifies for next season's Grand Prix series
Full-time Grand Prix rider
Wild card, track reserve or qualified reserve

Pos.	Rider	Points	POL (Poland)	SVN (Slovenia)	CZE (Czech Republic)	SWE (Sweden)	PL2 (Poland)	SCA (Sweden)	GER (Germany)	DEN (Denmark)	GBR (United Kingdom)	PL3 (Poland)
Gold	(Poland) (95) Bartosz Zmarzlik (C)	132	10	18	8	8	17	8	16	18	15	14
Silver	(Denmark) (30) Leon Madsen	130	13	13	14	7	14	14	10	7	17	21
Bronze	(Russia) (89) Emil Sayfutdinov	126	6	13	11	17	14	7	10	16	17	15
4	(Sweden) (66) Fredrik Lindgren	105	15	5	12	10	5	16	9	15	11	7
5	(Slovakia) (54) Martin Vaculík	95	7	17	4	16	15	9	4	7	9	7
6	(Poland) (71) Maciej Janowski	87	–	4	7	13	12	15	16	6	7	7
7	(Australia) (69) Jason Doyle	84	5	6	12	7	5	7	6	12	13	11
8	(Poland) (692) Patryk Dudek	79	16	12	12	7	8	6	8	3	3	4
9	(Slovenia) (55) Matej Žagar	78	7	6	4	10	3	7	15	13	9	4
10	(Denmark) (88) Niels-Kristian Iversen	77	14	7	3	8	2	7	13	7	5	11
11	(Russia) (222) Artem Laguta	76	4	9	9	5	7	16	8	5	6	7
12	(Sweden) (85) Antonio Lindbäck	63	10	3	4	6	7	8	–	9	9	7
13	(United Kingdom) (108) Tai Woffinden	60	6	9	–	–	6	6	8	11	5	9
14	(Poland) (333) Janusz Kołodziej	57	4	7	15	3	15	4	2	0	1	6
15	(United Kingdom) (505) Robert Lambert	39	8	7	6	3	–	–	4	3	6	2
16	(Australia) (46) Max Fricke	36	3	–	13	11	4	5	–	–	–	–
17	(Denmark) (155) Mikkel Michelsen	15	–	–	–	–	–	9	–	6	–	–
18	(Poland) (16) Bartosz Smektała	10	10	–	–	–	–	–	–	–	–	–
19	(Sweden) (16) Oliver Berntzon	7	–	–	–	7	–	–	–	–	–	–
20	(United Kingdom) (16) Charles Wright	5	–	–	–	–	–	–	–	–	5	–
21	(Czech Republic) (16) Václav Milík	4	–	–	4	–	–	–	–	–	–	–
22	(Poland) (16) Maksym Drabik	4	–	–	–	–	4	–	–	–	–	–
23	(Poland) (16) Adrian Miedziński	4	–	–	–	–	–	–	–	–	–	4
24	(Slovenia) (16) Matic Ivačič	2	–	2	–	–	–	–	–	–	–	–
25	(Sweden) (16) Jacob Thorssell	2	–	–	–	–	–	2	–	–	–	–
26	(Germany) (16) Martin Smolinski	1	–	–	–	–	–	–	1	–	–	–
27	(Czech Republic) (17) Zdeněk Holub	0	–	–	0	–	–	–	–	–	–	–
28	(Germany) (17) Kai Huckenbeck	0	–	–	–	–	–	–	0	–	–	–
Pos.	Rider	Points	POL (Poland)	SVN (Slovenia)	CZE (Czech Republic)	SWE (Sweden)	PL2 (Poland)	SCA (Sweden)	GER (Germany)	DEN (Denmark)	GBR (United Kingdom)	PL3 (Poland)

== See also ==
- 2019 Individual Speedway Junior World Championship
