= Leon Madsen =

Danish speedway rider

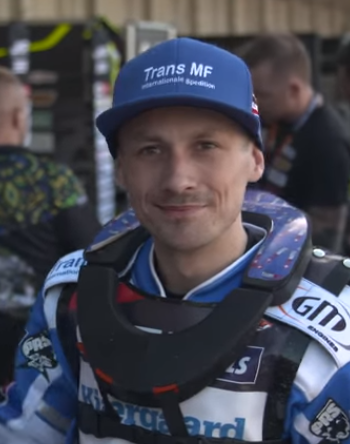
- Born: 5 September 1988 (age 38); Vejle, Denmark
- Nationality: Danish
- Website: leonmadsenracing.com

Career history

Denmark
- 2004–2006, 2013–2014: Slangerup
- 2007–2008, 2016–2017: Holstebro
- 2009–2010: Brovst
- 2011–2012: Esbjerg
- 2021–2022: Nordjysk
- 2023–2024: SES

Poland
- 2006: Grudziądz
- 2008–2010: Wrocław
- 2011–2013: Unia Tarnów
- 2014: Gdańsk
- 2015–2016: Unia Tarnów
- 2017–2024: Częstochowa
- 2025–2026: Zielona Góra

Sweden
- 2009: Indianerna
- 2011: Lejonen
- 2012, 2014, 2018: Vetlanda
- 2013: Hammarby
- 2017, 2025: Smederna
- 2023: Dackarna

Great Britain
- 2009–2010: Poole

Germany
- 2016–2018: Landshut

Speedway Grand Prix statistics
- SGP number: 30
- Starts: 76
- Finalist: 24 times
- Winner: 5 times

Individual honours
- 2019, 2022: Speedway World Championship runner-up
- 2018, 2022, 2026: European Champion
- 2017: Ekstraliga Riders’ Championship

Team honours
- 2020, 2021: World team championship bronze
- 2023: Speedway World Cup bronze

Leon Daniel Madsen (born 5 September 1988) is a Danish speedway rider who is a two-time World Championship silver medalist.

== Career ==
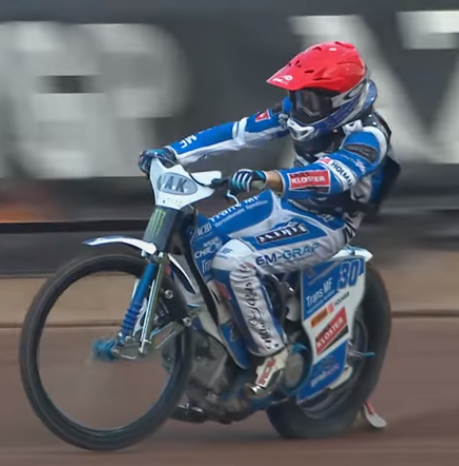
Qualifying for the 2019 Slovenian Grand Prix

Born in Vejle, Madsen won the 80cc junior World Championship in 2001.

In 2018, Madsen won the Individual Speedway European Championship for the first time. The following year in 2019, he won the silver medal in the Speedway World Championship, finishing runner-up in the 2019 Speedway Grand Prix behind Bartosz Zmarzlik. He won three Grand Prix events during the 2019 Championship.

Madsen was part of the Denmark national speedway team that won consecutive bronze medals at the 2020 Speedway of Nations and 2021 Speedway of Nations. In 2022, he returned to top form, winning the European Championship for the second time and once again finishing runner-up behind Bartosz Zmarzlik in the 2022 Speedway Grand Prix.

In 2023, Madsen was part of the Danish team that won the bronze medal in the 2023 Speedway World Cup final. He also won the silver medal at the 2023 Speedway European Championship. Despite an inconsistent 2023 Grand Prix campaign, he did win the Speedway Grand Prix of Denmark on 16 September and finished the season strongly to take fifth place in the World Championship and ensure his place in the 2024 Speedway Grand Prix.

Madsen's 2024 season was overshadowed by family problems and injury issues before he finally finished ninth in the world championship. He was controversially omitted from the 2025 Speedway Grand Prix.

== Major results ==
=== World individual Championships ===
- 2010 Speedway Grand Prix – 26th (3 pts)
- 2013 Speedway Grand Prix – 16th (30 pts)
- 2019 Speedway Grand Prix – 2nd (130 pts)
- 2020 Speedway Grand Prix – 5th (89 pts)
- 2021 Speedway Grand Prix – 7th (108 pts)
- 2022 Speedway Grand Prix – 2nd (133 pts)
- 2023 Speedway Grand Prix – 5th (111 pts)
- 2024 Speedway Grand Prix – 9th (94 pts)
- 2025 Speedway Grand Prix – 17th (16 pts)
- 2026 Speedway Grand Prix – 6th (100 pts)

=== Grand Prix wins ===
- 1: 2019 Speedway Grand Prix of Poland (Warsaw)
- 2: 2019 Speedway Grand Prix of Great Britain
- 3: 2019 Speedway Grand Prix of Poland (Toruń)
- 4: 2023 Speedway Grand Prix of Denmark
- 5: 2026 Speedway Grand Prix of Czech Republic

=== World team Championships ===
- 2019 Speedway of Nations – 4th
- 2020 Speedway of Nations – 3rd
- 2021 Speedway of Nations – 3rd
- 2022 Speedway of Nations – 4th
- 2023 Speedway World Cup – 3rd
- 2025 Speedway of Nations – 3rd
- 2026 Speedway World Cup – 2nd

=== European Championships ===
- Individual European Championship
  - 2007 – 13th
  - 2018 – Champion
  - 2019 – 3rd
  - 2020 – 2nd
  - 2021 – 2nd
  - 2022 – Champion
  - 2023 – 2nd
  - 2024 – 2nd
  - 2025 – 3rd
  - 2026 – Champion

=== Junior World Championships ===
- Individual U-21 World Championship (Under-21 World Championship)
  - 2008 – 7th placed in the Qualifying Round Four
  - 2009 – 9th placed in the Qualifying Round Five
- Team U-21 World Championship (Under-21 Speedway World Cup)
  - 2006 – rode in Qualifying Round One only
  - 2009 – Runner-up (11 pts)

== See also ==
- Denmark national speedway team (U-21)
