= Niels Kristian Iversen =

Danish speedway rider

Niels-Kristian Iversen
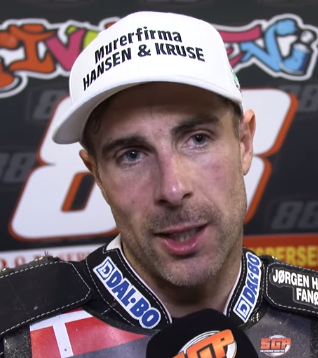
- Iversen in 2019
- Born: 20 June 1982 (age 44); Esbjerg, Denmark
- Nickname: PUK
- Nationality: Danish

Career history

Denmark
- 2001–2008, 2010: Holsted
- 2009, 2012–2025: Esbjerg
- 2011: Outrup

Great Britain
- 2001, 2011–2016, 2018, 2022, 2024–2025: King's Lynn
- 2003–2004: Newport
- 2003–2005, 2007: Oxford
- 2006–2007, 2009–2010, 2020, 2023: Peterborough
- 2008: Wolverhampton
- 2019: Ipswich

Poland
- 2004: Wrocław
- 2005: Rybnik
- 2006–2010: Zielona Góra
- 2011–2017: Gorzów
- 2018–2019: Toruń
- 2022: Łódź
- 2024–2025: Gdańsk

Sweden
- 2004–2009: Vastervik
- 2010–2016, 2021–2022: Indianerna
- 2018: Smederna
- 2017, 2019: Piraterna
- 2023: Rospiggarna
- 2024–2025: Vargarna

Speedway Grand Prix statistics
- SGP number: 88
- Starts: 92
- Podiums: 9 (5-2-2)
- Finalist: 18 times
- Winner: 1 times

Individual honours
- 2013: World Championship bronze
- 2012, 2013, 2014 2015, 2016, 2017 2018: Danish Individual Speedway Championship
- 2002: Danish Under-21 Champion
- 2013: Italian Grand Prix Champion
- 2013: Scandinavian Grand Prix Champion
- 2014: Danish Grand Prix Champion
- 2015: British Grand Prix Champion
- 2016: Torun Grand Prix Champion
- 2007, 2013: GP Challenge winner
- 2013: Brandonapolis

Team honours
- 2006, 2008, 2012, 2014: World Cup winner
- 2005: Craven Shield Winner
- 2005, 2018: Swedish Elitserien Champion
- 2002, 2004, 2023: Danish League
- 2006: Elite League Champion
- 2014, 2016: Speedway Ekstraliga

Niels Kristian Trochmann Iversen (Danish pronunciation: [ˈiˀvɐsn̩], born 20 June 1982 in Esbjerg, Denmark) is an international motorcycle speedway rider. He is a seven times national champion of Denmark and was part of the Danish teams that won the Speedway World Cup in 2006, 2008, 2012 and 2014.

== Early life ==
Niels-Kristian Trochmann was born 20 June 1982 in Esbjerg, Denmark to Ann Marie and Flemming Iversen. Growing up with older brother Soren, Iversen decided he want to be a speedway rider. His local town Esbjerg had a track where Iversen began to learn his desired trade. Quickly moving up the ranks in Denmark, his first title came in 1994 at the 50cc Danish Individual Championship. Moving up to 80cc in 1997 saw him win his second title at 15 years old. In 1998 Iversen moved up to full size 500cc bikes.

== Career ==
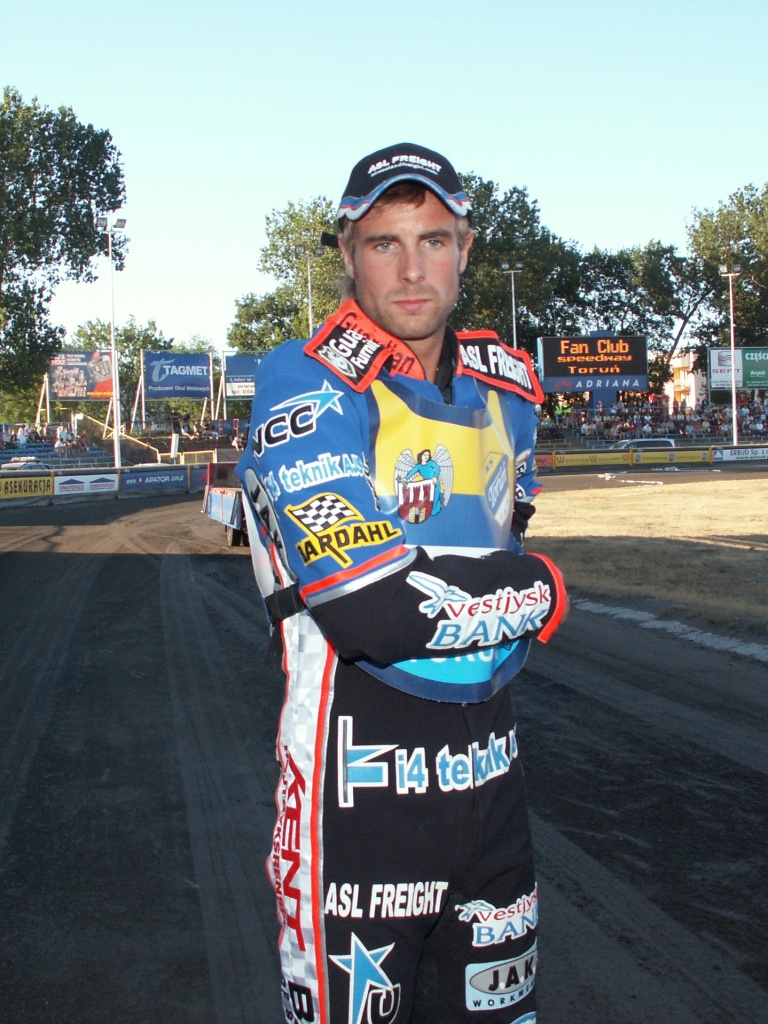
Iversen in 2006

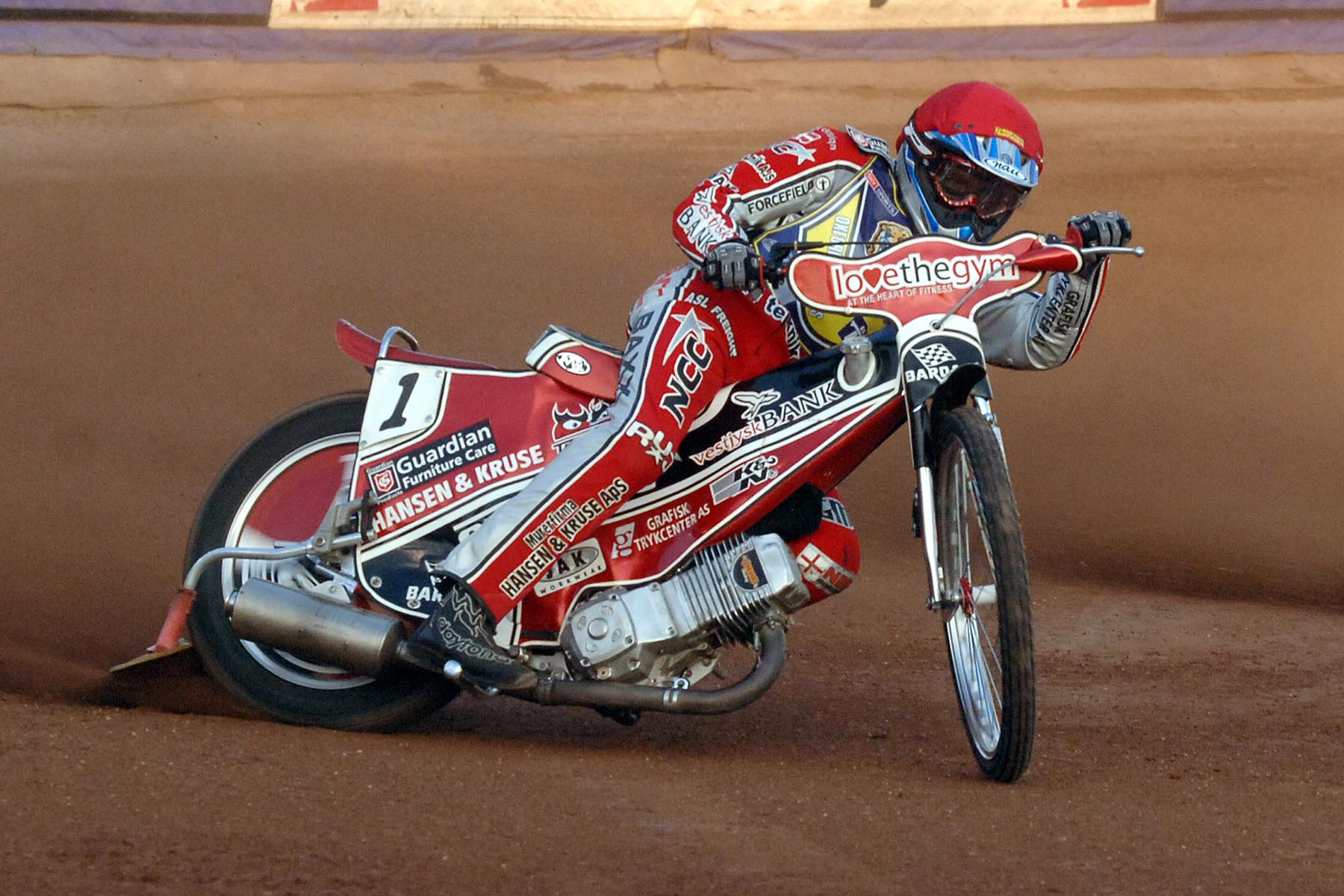
Iversen riding for Oxford in 2007

In 2001, British team King's Lynn Stars noticed Iversen and signed him for the last three meetings of the 2001 Elite League speedway season. In 2002, he helped Danish team Holsted Tigers to the Danish Speedway League as well as becoming the Danish U21 Champion.

Iversen came back to British shores in 2003 with Newport Wasps in the Premier League and was already signed for Holsted in Denmark. For his new British team he topped the averages with an average of 9.13 and 6 maximum scores, attracting Elite League club Oxford Cheetahs, while Holsted went on to retain their Division One Title. New Oxford team manager Nigel Wagstaff added Iversen to the team for four meetings at the end of the 2003 season and his performances gained him entry to the World U21 Final where he finished sixth. He was selected for the Denmark squad at the Speedway World Cup in August 2003: ten points from five rides helped Denmark through to the Grand Final where he and Kenneth Bjerre were replaced.

Iversen signed for Swedish club Västervik Speedway in the Elitserien and Wrocław in Poland. Oxford also signed Iversen for the 2004 season as a full-time Elite League rider, after he had earned a 6.57 point average over 32 meetings the previous year. In Denmark, he helped Holsted to a third Division One title in as many years. Once again he was selected for the 2004 Speedway World Cup where he went one better than his score in the previous year – 11 points including wins over Leigh Adams and Adam Shields. Danish Grand Prix organizers selected Iversen as the Wildcard in Copenhagen on 26 June, taking his chance he reached the semi-finals in his first Grand Prix and ended the meeting on 13 points.

2005 saw Iversen move to Rybnik in the Polish league and win the Elitserien with Swedish Club Vastervik, as well as being selected for Denmark's World Cup team where once again he hit double figures in the qualification round. The final was won by Poland but Iversen had earned himself a bronze medal for the third time. In Britain, Oxford retained his services for the season, where he won the Craven Shield. In 2006, Iversen moved to his third Polish club in as many years: Extraliga team Zielona Góra signed him from Rybnik while in Britain Peterborough Panthers gave Iversen an opportunity to transfer. Grand Prix officials had nominated Iversen for a full spot in the GP series, the highlight came in his home GP at Copenhagen scoring 8 points. The series finished with Iversen on 51 points and outside the qualification places in 13th. During the 2006 Elite League speedway season Iversen helped Peterborough to their first league win since 1999 and his performances earned him selected for Denmark's World Cup team. The Danes got through to the 2006 Speedway World Cup final via the race-off where Iversen scored 7 points. Denmark went on to win the final ahead of Sweden giving Iversen his first gold medal.

In 2007, for the fifth season in a row, Iversen was selected for his country and was part of the Danish team that finished second to Poland in the World Cup Final at Leszno on 21 July. His Danish team Holsted enjoyed success in the Superleague Championship and in Sweden, Vastervik side made it through to the Elitserien playoff finals. At the 2007 Grand Prix challenge Iversen won the final at Vojens resulting in qualification as a full-time member for the second time in the Grand Prix series.

During the 2008 Speedway Grand Prix season, Iversen crashed in the Swedish Grand Prix and broke his shoulder and at the end of the season he finished outside the automatic qualification places in 12th place. Selected for the World cup again, Iversen and the Danish team earned victory in the 2008 final and giving him his second Gold Medal.

Brought back to Peterborough in 2009, Iversen became the captain of the Panthers and based himself in the city. Although his average dropped, he was a crucial part of the team that finished mid-table. In Denmark, he signed for local club Esbjerg Vikings but could only manage 6th place overall, while in Poland Iversen stayed with Zielona Gora who went on to win the Extraliga title, earning Iversen his first Polish team win. In 2010, Iversen spent his fourth season with Peterborough in the British Elite League and stayed with Zielona Góra in the Polish Extraliga. In Denmark, he moved back to Holsted after a year away from the club while in Sweden he moved from Vastervik to Indianerna. On 31 August, Iversen was selected for a wildcard place at the Nordic Grand Prix on 11 September.

In 2011, Iversen left Peterborough and joined the King's Lynn Stars, who had moved up to the Elite League. He remained with King's Lynn for six years. 2012 would prove to be his best year to date, winning the Danish Individual Speedway Championship for the first time and winning the World Cup for a third time, as well as putting up front-running averages in all of the major leagues. To top it off he finished third in the Grand Prix Challenge in Croatia, and would thus return to Grand Prix for 2013.

Over the next few years from 2013 to 2016, Iversen would establish himself as one of the world’s elite riders. He collected the bronze medal on his series return in 2013 and won five grand prix during that period, including a home win at the Parken Stadium in 2014. Also in 2014 he won his fourth World Cup gold medal, overtaking Poland’s Janusz Kolodziej on the final bend of the final heat to seal the title. He would also claim seven consecutive Danish Individual Championships from 2012 to 2018. League success would also come during this period, he joined Stal Gorzów in 2012 and would be a major contributor to title wins in 2014 and 2016, as well as adding a second Swedish Elitserien with Smederna in 2018. He continued to appear in the World Championship until the end of the 2020 Speedway Grand Prix. His last appearance for Denmark came at the 2019 Speedway of Nations.

In 2022, Iversen returned to ride for the King's Lynn Stars in the SGB Premiership 2022 and then returned to Peterborough for the SGB Premiership 2023. In 2023, he helped Esbjerg Vikings win the Danish League. In 2024, he switched back to riding for King's Lynn Stars following the demise of Peterborough.

== Major results ==
=== World individual Championship ===
- 2004 Speedway Grand Prix - =23rd (13 pts) wildcard
- 2005 Speedway Grand Prix - 19th (7 pts) wildcard
- 2006 Speedway Grand Prix - 13th (51 pts)
- 2008 Speedway Grand Prix - 12th (59 pts)
- 2009 Speedway Grand Prix - 17th (20 pts) wildcard
- 2010 Speedway Grand Prix - 22nd (6 pts) reserve
- 2013 Speedway Grand Prix - 3rd (132 pts) including Italian & Swedish grand prix wins
- 2014 Speedway Grand Prix - 11th (87 pts) including Danish grand prix win
- 2015 Speedway Grand Prix - 4th (120 pts) including British grand prix win
- 2016 Speedway Grand Prix - 8th (91 pts) including Polish grand prix win
- 2017 Speedway Grand Prix - 15th (44 pts)
- 2018 Speedway Grand Prix - 14th (36 pts)
- 2019 Speedway Grand Prix - 10th (77 pts)
- 2020 Speedway Grand Prix - 13th (32 pts)

=== World team Championships ===
- 2003 Speedway World Cup - 3rd (rode in heats)
- 2004 Speedway World Cup - 3rd
- 2005 Speedway World Cup - 3rd
- 2006 Speedway World Cup - Winner
- 2007 Speedway World Cup - 2nd
- 2008 Speedway World Cup - Winner
- 2009 Speedway World Cup - 6th
- 2010 Speedway World Cup - 2nd
- 2011 Speedway World Cup - 4th
- 2012 Speedway World Cup - Winner
- 2013 Speedway World Cup - 2nd
- 2014 Speedway World Cup - Winner
- 2015 Speedway World Cup - 2nd
- 2016 Speedway World Cup - 5th
- 2017 Speedway World Cup - 8th
- 2019 Speedway of Nations - 4th
