= Janusz Kołodziej (speedway rider) =

Polish speedway rider

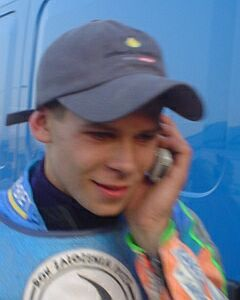
- Born: 27 May 1984 (age 42); Tarnów, Poland
- Nationality: Polish

Career history

Poland
- 2000-2009, 2012-2016: Tarnów
- 2010-2011, 2017-2025: Leszno

Great Britain
- 2003, 2006-2007: Reading

Sweden
- 2004-2009: Rospiggarna
- 2010-2014: Vetlanda

Speedway Grand Prix statistics
- SGP number: 333
- Starts: 22
- Podiums: 2 (1-0-1)
- Finalist: 3 times
- Winner: 1 times

Individual honours
- 2005, 2010, 2013, 2019: Polish Individual Champion
- 2004: Polish Under-21 Champion
- 2005: Golden Helmet Winner
- 2005: Silver Helmet Winner
- 2003: Bronze Helmet Winner
- 2019: Czech Republic Grand Prix Champion
- 2018: GP Challenge winner

Team honours
- 2010, 2011, 2023: World team champion
- 2005: European Pairs Champion
- 2022: European Team champion
- 2007: Polish Pairs Speedway Champion
- 2004: Polish Under-21 Pairs Champion
- 2004, 2005: Ekstraliga Champion

Janusz Kołodziej (born 27 May 1984 in Tarnów, Poland) is a Polish speedway rider who has ridden for the Polish national team and is a four times champion of Poland.

== Career ==
Kołodziej rode in Britain for the Reading Racers in 2003 and from 2006 to 2007.

In July 2018, during the Speedway Grand Prix Qualification, Kołodziej won the GP Challenge, which ensured that he claimed a permanent slot for the 2019 Speedway Grand Prix.

In 2019, Kołodziej won his fourth Polish title, he had previously been the Polish champion in 2005, 2010 and 2013.

In 2022, Kołodziej was a member of the Polish team that won the inaugural European Team Speedway Championship. In July 2023, he was part of the Polish team that won the gold medal in the 2023 Speedway World Cup final. This was his third World Cup win. Also in 2023, he won the bronze medal at the 2023 Speedway European Championship.

== Speedway Grand Prix results ==
2005 Speedway Grand Prix Final Championship standings (Riding No 17)
Race no.	Grand Prix	Pos.	Pts.	Heats	Draw No
1 /9	(Europe) European SGP	17th	-	-	17

2006 Speedway Grand Prix Final Championship standings (Riding No 17)
Race no.	Grand Prix	Pos.	Pts.	Heats	Draw No
2 /10	(Europe) European SGP	17th	0	(0)	17
10 /10	(Poland) Polish SGP	17th	-	-	17

permanent speedway rider
wild card, track reserve or qualified reserve
rider not classified (track reserve who did not start)

== Career ==
=== World individual Championships ===
- 2006 – 29th place

=== World team Championships ===
- 2004 – 4th place
- 2006 – 5th place
- 2010 Speedway World Cup - Winner
- 2011 Speedway World Cup - Winner
- 2014 Speedway World Cup - runner up
- 2023 Speedway World Cup - Winner

=== Other major results ===
- Team U-21 World Championship
  - 2005 – World Champion (14 points)
- Individual European Championship
  - 2004 – finalist
- Individual U-19 European Championship
  - 2003 – Silver medal
- European Pairs Championship
  - 2005 – European Champion (4 points)
- European Club Champions' Cup
  - 2006 – European Champion (14 points)
- Individual Polish Championship
  - 2002 – injury in Semi-Final A (5th place in Quarter-Final B – qualification to Semi-Final)
  - 2003 – 12 place in Semi-Final B
  - 2005 – Polish Champion (15 points)
  - 2006 – injury (8th place in Semi-Final B – qualification to Final
- Individual U-21 Polish Championship
  - 2001 – 16th place (0 point)
  - 2002 – Bronze medal (11+2 points)
  - 2003 – 5th place (11 points)
  - 2004 – Polish Champion (13 points)
  - 2005 – Silver medal (13 points)
- Polish Pairs Speedway Championship
  - 2001 – 6th place in Semi-Final (2 points)
  - 2002 – 3rd place in Semi-Final C (0 heat as reserve)
  - 2003 – 3rd place in Semi-Final C (7 points)
  - 2004 – Silver medal (1 point)
  - 2005 – 3rd place in Semi-Final C (13 points)
  - 2007 – Polish Champion (0 point)
- Polish Under-21 Pairs Championship
  - 2001 – 6th place in Semi-Final A (9 points)
  - 2002 – 6th place (12 points)
  - 2003 – 6th place (15 points)
  - 2004 – Polish Champion (17 points)
  - 2005 – Silver medal (14 points)
- Polish Team Championship
  - 2000 – 2nd place in Second League with Unia Tarnów
  - 2001 – 1st place in Second League with Unia Tarnów
  - 2002 – 5th place in First League with Unia Tarnów
  - 2003 – 2nd place in First League with Unia Tarnów
  - 2004 – Polish Champion with Unia Tarnów
  - 2005 – Polish Champion with Unia Tarnów
  - 2006 – 4th place with Unia Tarnów
  - 2007 – 6th place with Unia Tarnów
- Polish Under-21 Team Championship
  - 2000 – 3rd place in Qualification Group C
  - 2001 – 2nd place in Qualification Group D
  - 2002 – 2nd place in Qualification Group C
  - 2003 – 2nd place in Qualification Group B
  - 2004 – Bronze medal (started in Qualification Group B)
  - 2005 – Silver medal (10 points)
- Golden Helmet
  - 2005 – Winner (14 points)
  - 2006 – injury (qualification to Final)
  - 2007 – 17th place (0 point as track reserve)
- Silver Helmet (U-21)
  - 2001 – 7th place (9 points)
  - 2003 – Silver medal (13 points)
  - 2004 – injury (2nd place in Semi-Final B – qualification to Final
  - 2005 – Winner (13 points)
- Bronze Helmet (U-19)
  - 2001 – 6th place (9 points)
  - 2003 – Winner (15 points)

== See also ==
- Poland national speedway team
- List of Speedway Grand Prix riders
