= Václav Milík Jr. =

Czech speedway rider (born 1993)

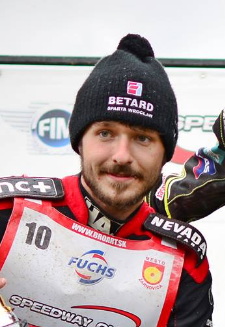
- Born: 22 May 1993 (age 33)
- Nationality: Czech

Career history

Czech Republic
- 2009–2011, 2013–2022: Pardubice

Poland
- 2012: Kraków
- 2013–2014: Rybnik
- 2015–2016: Wrocław
- 2022–2024: Krosno
- 2025: Łódź

Great Britain
- 2014: Poole
- 2015: King's Lynn
- 2024: Birmingham

Sweden
- 2017–2019: Indianerna
- 2022–2025: Piraterna

Germany
- 2019: Landshut

Speedway Grand Prix statistics
- Starts: 14
- Finalist: 1 times
- Winner: 0 times

Individual honours
- 2012, 2014 2015, 2016 2019, 2021 2022, 2023: Czech Republic Individual Champion
- 2017: Golden Helmet of Pardubice

Team honours
- 2014: Czech Under-21 Pairs Champion

Václav Milík Jr. (born 22 May 1993) is a Czech speedway rider. He is a member of the Czech Republic national speedway team. He is a son of former Czechoslovak and Czech speedway rider Václav Milík Sr.

== Biography ==
Václav Milík Jr. was born on 22 May 1993, Čáslav, Czech Republic. He is an eight times champion of the Czech Republic, after winning the Czech Republic Championship in 2012, 2014, 2015, 2016, 2019, 2021, 2022 and 2023. With Krystian Pieszczek he won the Czech Under-21 Pairs Final in 2014.

In 2022, Milík helped Wilki Krosno win the 2022 1.Liga. In 2023, he was part of the Czech team that competed at the 2023 Speedway World Cup in Poland and later in the season, he won his eighth individual national Championship and third in succession.

Milík returned to British speedway in 2024, after signing for Birmingham Brummies. He rode for the Czech Republic during the 2024 Speedway of Nations (world team championship).

== Personal life ==
Milík's father Václav Milík Sr. was also a speedway rider.

== Major results ==
=== World individual Championship ===
- 2023 Speedway Grand Prix – =26th
- 2024 Speedway Grand Prix – =23rd

=== World U21 Championships ===
- Individual U-21 World Championship
  - 2010 – nominated as wild card for the final Three
    - lost in the Qualifying round Three also
- Team U-21 World Championship
  - 2009 – (Poland) Gorzów Wielkopolski – 4th placed (2 pts)
  - 2010 – lost in the qualifying round One

=== European Championships ===
- Individual U-19 European Championship
  - 2010 – lost in the semi-final One
- Team U-19 European Championship
  - 2009 – (Denmark) Holsted – 4th placed (2 pts)
  - 2010 – (Czech Republic) Divišov – 3rd placed (9 pts)

== See also ==
- Czech Republic national speedway team
