= 2013 Speedway Grand Prix of New Zealand =

Speedway event

- Buckley Systems New Zealand FIM SGP

Information
- Date: 23 March 2013
- City: (New Zealand) Auckland
- Event: 1 of 12 (157)
- Referee: Craig Ackroyd
- Jury President: Wolfgang Glas

Stadium details
- Stadium: Western Springs Stadium
- Capacity: 15,000
- Length: 413 m (452 yd)
- Track: speedway

SGP Results
- Best Time
- (gold) Winner: (Poland) Jarosław Hampel
- (silver) Runner-up: (Poland) Tomasz Gollob
- (bronze) 3rd place: (Denmark) Nicki Pedersen

The 2013 FIM New Zealand Speedway Grand Prix was the first round of the 2013 Speedway Grand Prix season. It took place on 23 March at the Western Springs Stadium in Auckland, New Zealand.

The Speedway Grand Prix of New Zealand was won by Jarosław Hampel, who beat former champions Tomasz Gollob, Nicki Pedersen and Greg Hancock in the final. Although Hampel won the event, Gollob left New Zealand as the championship leader.

== Riders ==
The Speedway Grand Prix Commission nominated Jason Bunyan as the event Wild Card, and Sean Mason and Dale Finch as Track Reserves. The Draw was made on March 22.

== Results ==
=== Details ===
Placing	Draw	Rider	Total	1	2	3	4	5	6	7	8	9	10	11	12	13	14	15	16	17	18	19	20	Pts	Pos	21	22	23
1	12	(Poland) (10) Jarosław Hampel	15			1					1		3			2						2		9	7	3		3
2	1	(Poland) (4) Tomasz Gollob	15	3				1				3				0				3				10	3		3	2
3	9	(Denmark) (2) Nicki Pedersen	12			0		0						3					3		3			9	4	2		1
4	5	(United States) (3) Greg Hancock	11		3			3					1					1					1	9	5		2	0
5	11	(Australia) (15) Darcy Ward	12			3				3		1					1						3	11	1	1
6	13	(Sweden) (8) Andreas Jonsson	11				3	2							3		2					1		11	2		0
7	2	(United Kingdom) (14) Tai Woffinden	9	2					2				0				3				2			9	6	0
8	7	(Australia) (1) Chris Holder	9		2					2					0	3					1			8	8		1
9	15	(Sweden) (7) Fredrik Lindgren	8				2			1			2						2	1				8	9
10	8	(Denmark) (13) Niels Kristian Iversen	7		1						2			2			Fx			2				7	10
11	14	(Russia) (5) Emil Sayfutdinov	6				0		3					0		1							2	6	11
12	16	(Sweden) (6) Antonio Lindbäck	6				1				0	2						3			0			6	12
13	4	(Poland) (11) Krzysztof Kasprzak	6	0							3				2				1				0	6	13
14	3	(Slovenia) (12) Matej Žagar	5	1						0				1				0				3		5	14
15	10	(Slovakia) (9) Martin Vaculík	5			2			0						1			2		0				5	15
16	6	(Australia) (16) Jason Bunyan	1		0				1			0							Fx			0		1	16
17	17	(New Zealand) (17) Sean Mason	-																					-	17
18	18	(New Zealand) (18) Dale Finch	-																					-	18
Placing	Draw	Rider	Total	1	2	3	4	5	6	7	8	9	10	11	12	13	14	15	16	17	18	19	20	Pts	Pos	21	22	23

e: retired or mechanical failure • m: exclusion for exceeding two minute time allowance • t: exclusion for touching the tapes • x: other exclusion • f: fell
ns: non-starter • nc: non-classify
Semi-finals: Heat 21: Riders placed 1st, 4th, 6th & 7th in the intermediate classification (after 20 heats)
Heat 22: Riders placed 2nd, 3rd, 5th & 8th in the intermediate classification (after 20 heats)
Big Final (heat 23): The first and second placed riders in each of the Semi-Finals

gate A – inside	gate B	gate C	gate D – outside

=== By heat ===
1. Gollob, Woffinden, Žagar, Kasprzak
2. Hancock, Holder, Iversen, Bunyan
3. Ward, Vaculík, Hampel, Pedersen
4. Jonsson, Lindgren, Lindbaeck, Sayfutdinov
5. Hancock, Jonsson, Gollob, Pedersen
6. Sayfutdinov, Woffinden, Bunyan, Vaculík
7. Ward, Holder, Lindgren, Žagar
8. Kasprzak, Iversen, Hampel, Lindbaeck
9. Gollob, Lindbaeck, Ward, Bunyan
10. Hampel, Lindgren, Hancock, Woffinden
11. Pedersen, Iversen, Žagar, Sayfutdinov
12. Jonsson, Kasprzak, Vaculík, Holder
13. Holder, Hampel, Sayfutdinov, Gollob
14. Woffinden, Jonsson, Ward, Iversen (F4x)
15. Lindbaeck, Vaculík, Hancock, Žagar
16. Pedersen, Lindgren, Kasprzak, Bunyan (Fx)
17. Gollob, Iversen, Lindgren, Vaculík
18. Pedersen, Woffinden, Holder, Lindbaeck
19. Žagar, Hampel, Jonsson, Bunyan
20. Ward, Sayfutdinov, Hancock, Kasprzak
  Semifinals:
21. Hampel, Pedersen, Ward, Woffinden
22. Gollob, Hancock, Holder, Jonsson
  fhe Final
23. Hampel, Gollob, Pedersen, Hancock

== Standings after the event ==
Qualifies for next season's Grand Prix series
Full-time Grand Prix rider
Wild card, track reserve or qualified reserve

Pos.	Rider	Points	NZL (New Zealand)	EUR (Poland)	SWE (Sweden)	CZE (Czech Republic)	GBR (United Kingdom)	POL (Poland)	DEN (Denmark)	ITA (Italy)	LAT (Latvia)	SLO (Slovenia)	SCA (Sweden)	PL2 (Poland)
1	(Poland) (4) Tomasz Gollob	15	15											
2	(Poland) (10) Jarosław Hampel	15	15											
3	(Denmark) (2) Nicki Pedersen	12	12											
4	(Australia) (15) Darcy Ward	12	12											
5	(United States) (3) Greg Hancock	11	11											
6	(Sweden) (8) Andreas Jonsson	11	11											
7	(Australia) (1) Chris Holder	9	9											
8	(United Kingdom) (14) Tai Woffinden	9	9											
9	(Sweden) (7) Fredrik Lindgren	8	8											
10	(Denmark) (13) Niels Kristian Iversen	7	7											
11	(Russia) (5) Emil Sayfutdinov	6	6											
12	(Sweden) (6) Antonio Lindbäck	6	6											
13	(Poland) (11) Krzysztof Kasprzak	6	6											
14	(Slovakia) (9) Martin Vaculík	5	5											
15	(Slovenia) (12) Matej Žagar	5	5											
16	(New Zealand) (16) Jason Bunyan	1	1	–										
Rider(s) not classified
	(New Zealand) (17) Dale Finch	—	ns	–										
	(New Zealand) (18) Sean Mason	—	ns	–										
Pos.	Rider	Points	NZL (New Zealand)	EUR (Poland)	SWE (Sweden)	CZE (Czech Republic)	GBR (United Kingdom)	POL (Poland)	DEN (Denmark)	ITA (Italy)	LAT (Latvia)	SLO (Slovenia)	SCA (Sweden)	PL2 (Poland)

== See also ==
- motorcycle speedway
