= 2013 Speedway European Championship =

Motorcycle racing competition

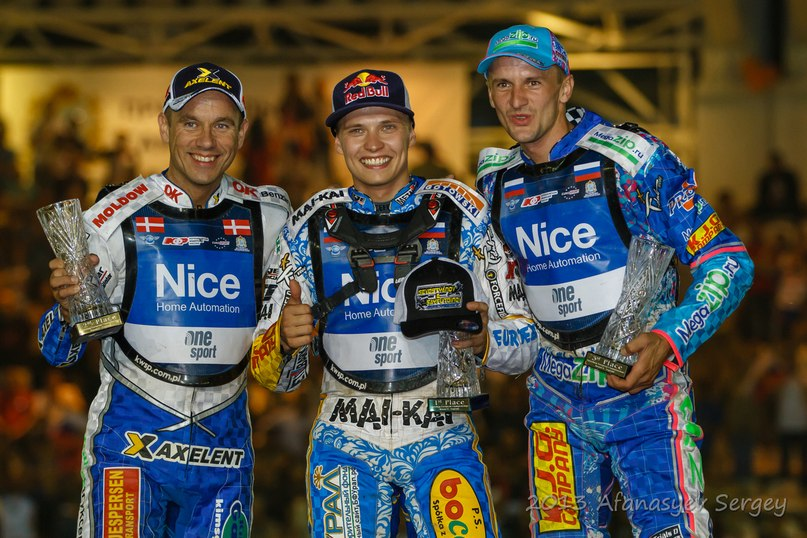
- Round two podium in Tolyatti

Season details
- Dates: 27 July – 29 September
- Events: 4
- Cities: 4
- Countries: 3
- Riders: 15 permanents 1 wild card(s); 2 track reserves
- Heats: 88 (in 4 events)

Winners
- Champion: SVK Martin Vaculík
- Runner-up: DEN Nicki Pedersen
- 3rd place: RUS Grigory Laguta

The 2013 Speedway European Championship season was the premiere season of the Speedway European Championship era, and decided the 13th UEM Individual Speedway European Championship. It was the first series under the promotion of One Sport Lts. of Poland.

The 2013 Speedway European Championship was won by Martin Vaculík from Slovakia

== Qualification ==
For the 2013 season there are 15 permanent riders, joined at each SEC Final by one wild card and two track reserves.

Defending champion, Aleš Dryml, Jr. of Czech Republic, was invited to participate in all finals event, as of top European Grand Prix riders: Tomasz Gollob of Poland, Nicki Pedersen of Denmark, Andreas Jonsson of Sweden and Emil Sayfutdinov of Russia. Three weeks before Final One, Tai Woffinden of Great Britain was invited to the series also. Injured Andreas Jonsson was replaced by another the Swede Fredrik Lindgren.

Nine riders were qualified from the SEC Challenge, qualification final, preceded by three Semifinal event. The SEC Challenge was won by Jurica Pavlic of Croatia.

=== Qualified riders ===
#	Riders	SEC Ch place
1	(Czech Republic) Aleš Dryml, Jr.	
2	(Poland) Tomasz Gollob	
3	(Sweden) Fredrik Lindgren	
4	(Denmark) Nicki Pedersen	
5	(Russia) Emil Sayfutdinov	
6	(Croatia) Jurica Pavlic	1
7	(Russia) Roman Povazhny	2
8	(Russia) Grigorij Laguta	3
9	(Slovakia) Martin Vaculík	4
10	(Ukraine) Andriy Karpov	5
11	(Poland) Maciej Janowski	6
12	(Denmark) Hans N. Andersen	7
13	(Poland) Sebastian Ułamek	8
14	(Latvia) Ķasts Puodžuks	9
15	(United Kingdom) Tai Woffinden	

=== Wild cards and track reserves ===
#	Final One – Gdańsk, Poland	Final Two – Tolyatti, Russia	Final Three – Goričan, Croatia	Final Four – Rzeszów, Poland
16	(Poland) Krystian Pieszczek	(Russia) Artem Laguta	(Poland) Krzysztof Kasprzak	(Poland) Grzegorz Walasek
17	(Poland) Artur Mroczka	(Russia) Vitaly Belousov	(Poland) Łukasz Sówka	(Poland) Łukasz Sówka
18	(Russia) Renat Gafurov	(Russia) Oleg Beschastnov	(Croatia) Renato Cvetko	(Poland) Maciej Kuciapa

=== BSI—One Sports relationships ===
The Speedway Grand Prix promoter, BSI of the United Kingdom, effectively prevented the appearance top riders in SEC. British federation, Auto-Cycle Union (ACU) after the withdrawal of Nicholls refused to nominate other British riders.

Because final events date do not coincide with Wolverhampton Wolves matches, ACU and BSPA have to agree of Tai Woffinden' participating in the series.

ACU and British Speedway Promoters' Association refused to appearance in a tournament qualifier British star, Scott Nicholls. On 27 July, Final One date, Nicholls need ride in British Elite League event. Then ACU does not agree that Hans N. Andersen could be replaced in Swindon Robins match. Andersen informed the club and a league that he will take part in the SEC before signing the contract.

== Results ==
The 2013 season consist of 4 events.

Round	Date	City and venue	Winner	Runner-up	3rd placed	4th placed	Results
1	27 July	(Poland) Gdańsk, Poland; Zbigniew Podlecki Stadium	(Russia) Emil Sayfutdinov	(Denmark) Nicki Pedersen	(United Kingdom) Tai Woffinden	(Poland) Tomasz Gollob	
2	10 August	Tolyatti, Russia; Mega-Lada Stadium	(Russia) Emil Sayfutdinov	(Denmark) Nicki Pedersen	(Russia) Grigory Laguta	(United Kingdom) Tai Woffinden	
3	14 September	Goričan, Croatia; Stadium Milenium	(Poland) Krzysztof Kasprzak	(Poland) Sebastian Ułamek	(Slovakia) Martin Vaculik	(Poland) Tomasz Gollob	
4	29 September	Rzeszów, Poland; Municipal Stadium	(Slovakia) Martin Vaculik	(Russia) Grigory Laguta	(Denmark) Hans N. Andersen	(Poland) Grzegorz Zengota	

== Classification ==
Pos.	Rider	Points	(Poland)	(Russia)	(Croatia)	(Poland)
1	(Slovakia) (9) Martin Vaculik	47	9	10	10	18
2	(Denmark) (4) Nicki Pedersen	44	12	12	10	10
3	(Russia) (8) Grigory Laguta	42	4	15	7	16
4	(Denmark) (12) Hans N. Andersen	35	8	9	8	10
5	(United Kingdom) (15) Tai Woffinden	33	11	12	10	–
5	(Poland) (11) Maciej Janowski	33	10	7	8	8
7	(Poland) (2) Tomasz Gollob	32	13	9	10	–
8	(Sweden) (3) Fredrik Lindgren	28	4	9	7	8
9	(Russia) (5) Emil Sayfutdinov	27	14	13	–	–
10	(Poland) (13) Sebastian Ułamek	22	6	–	14	2
10	(Ukraine) (10) Andriy Karpov	22	5	1	6	10
12	(Croatia) (6) Jurica Pavlic	20	4	7	6	3
13	(Poland) (16) Krzysztof Kasprzak	15	–	–	15	–
13	(Poland) (22) Grzegorz Zengota	15	–	–	4	11
13	(Czech Republic) (1) Aleš Dryml, Jr.	15	5	1	2	7
16	(Russia) (19) Artem Laguta	12	–	12	–	–
17	(Latvia) (14) Ķasts Puodžuks	10	10	0	–	–
18	(Russia) (7) Roman Povazhny	9	6	3	–	–
19	(Poland) (20) Robert Miśkowiak	11	–	–	5	6
20	(Poland) (16) Grzegorz Walasek	7	–	–	–	7
21	(Denmark) (19) Leon Madsen	6	–	–	–	6
22	(Poland) (16) Krystian Pieszczek	5	5	–	–	–
22	(Italy) (21) Nicolas Covatti	5	–	–	4	1
24	(Russia) (16) Vitaly Belousov	3	–	3	–	–
24	(Poland) (17) Łukasz Sówka	3	–	–	ns	3
26	(Russia) (17) Oleg Beschastnov	2	–	2	–	–
27	(Russia) (18) Daniil Ivanov	1	–	1	–	–
	(Poland) (17) Artur Mroczka	—	ns	–	–	–
	(Russia) (18) Renat Gafurov	—	ns	–	–	–
	(Croatia) (18) Renato Cvetko	—	–	–	ns	–
	(Poland) (18) Maciej Kuciapa	—	–	–	–	ns

2013 Speedway European Champion
(Slovakia)
Martin Vaculik
First title

== Broadcasting ==
Territory	Rights holder	Ref
World wide	Eurosport and Eurosport 2	

== See also ==
- 2013 Speedway Grand Prix
