= Speedway Grand Prix of Slovenia =

Slovenian round of the motorcycle speedway world championship

(Slovenia) FIM Slovenian Speedway Grand Prix
- Stadium: Matija Gubec Stadium, Krško
- Years: 14 (2002-2009, 2013, 2015–2019)
- Track: speedway track
- Track Length: 387,7 m

Last Event (season 2019)
- Date: 2019

The Speedway Grand Prix of Slovenia was a motorcycle speedway event that was a part of the Speedway Grand Prix Series. Initially staged between 2002 and 2009, and again in 2013, it returned to the calendar in 2015 before ending in 2019.

== Winners ==
| | Season | City | Stadium | Winner |
|---|---|---|---|---|---|
| 1 | 2002 | Krško | Matija Gubec Stadium | (Australia) Ryan Sullivan | result |
| 2 | 2003 | Krško | Matija Gubec Stadium | (Australia) Leigh Adams | result |
| 3 | 2004 | Krško | Matija Gubec Stadium | (Sweden) Tony Rickardsson | result |
| 4 | 2005 | Krško | Matija Gubec Stadium | (Sweden) Tony Rickardsson | result |
| 5 | 2006 | Krško | Matija Gubec Stadium | (Denmark) Nicki Pedersen | result |
| 6 | 2007 | Krško | Matija Gubec Stadium | (Denmark) Nicki Pedersen | result |
| 7 | 2008 | Krško | Matija Gubec Stadium | (Poland) Tomasz Gollob | result |
| 8 | 2009 | Krško | Matija Gubec Stadium | (Russia) Emil Sayfutdinov | result |
| 9 | 2013 | Krško | Matija Gubec Stadium | (Poland) Jarosław Hampel | result |
| 10 | 2015 | Krško | Matija Gubec Stadium | (United States) Greg Hancock | result |
| 11 | 2016 | Krško | Matija Gubec Stadium | (Denmark) Peter Kildemand | result |
| 12 | 2017 | Krško | Matija Gubec Stadium | (Slovakia) Martin Vaculík | result |
| 13 | 2018 | Krško | Matija Gubec Stadium | (Poland) Patryk Dudek | result |
| 14 | 2019 | Krško | Matija Gubec Stadium | (Poland) Bartosz Zmarzlik | result |

== Most wins ==
- Tony Rickardsson - 2 times
- Nicki Pedersen - 2 times
