= 2016 Speedway European Championship =

Motorcycle racing competition

Season details
- Dates: 16 July – 17 September
- Events: 4
- Cities: 4
- Countries: 4
- Riders: 15 permanents 1 wild card(s); 2 track reserves
- Heats: (in 4 events)

Winners
- Champion: DEN Nicki Pedersen
- Runner-up: CZE Václav Milík
- 3rd place: POL Krzysztof Kasprzak

The 2016 Speedway European Championship season was the fourth season of the Speedway European Championship (SEC) era, and the 16th UEM Individual Speedway European Championship. It was the fourth series under the promotion of One Sport Lts. of Poland.

The championship was won by Nicki Pedersen, who claimed the title for the first time. He won by two points from Václav Milík, who beat Krzysztof Kasprzak in a run-off for second place. Grigory Laguta and Leon Madsen finished fourth and fifth to ensure qualification for the 2017 competition. Two-time defending champion Emil Sayfutdinov finished seventh.

== Qualification ==
For the 2016 season, 15 permanent riders were joined at each SEC Final by one wild card and two track reserves.

Defending champion, Emil Sayfutdinov from Russia was automatically invited to participate in all final events. Nicki Pedersen, Antonio Lindbäck, Janusz Kołodziej and Martin Vaculík secured their participation in all final events thanks to being in the top five of the general classification in the 2015 season.

Seven riders qualified through the SEC Challenge and the line-up was then completed when Grigory Laguta, Václav Milík and Andžejs Ļebedevs received and accepted wild cards to compete.

=== Qualified riders ===
#	Riders	2015 place	SEC Ch place	Appearance
89	(Russia) Emil Sayfutdinov	1		4th
3	(Denmark) Nicki Pedersen	2		4th
85	(Sweden) Antonio Lindbäck	3		2nd
27	(Poland) Janusz Kołodziej	4		3rd
54	(Slovakia) Martin Vaculík	5		4th
507	(Poland) Krzysztof Kasprzak	-	1	2nd
66	(Denmark) Leon Madsen		2	1st
610	(Finland) Joonas Kylmäkorpi		3	1st
59	(Poland) Przemysław Pawlicki	7	4	2nd
34	(Denmark) Hans N. Andersen	9	5	3rd
36	(Sweden) Peter Ljung		6	1st
5	(Denmark) Anders Thomsen		7	1st
7	(Russia) Grigory Laguta	6		4th
13	(Czech Republic) Václav Milík	12		2nd
29	(Latvia) Andžejs Ļebedevs			2nd

== Calendar ==
=== Qualification ===
The calendar for qualification consisted of 3 Semifinal events and one SEC Challenge event.

Round	Date	City and venue	Winner	Runner-up	3rd placed	4th placed	Results
Semifinal 1	30 April	Debrecen, Hungary Speedway Stadium	(Czech Republic) Eduard Krčmář	(Germany) Martin Smolinski	(Sweden) Peter Ljung	(Denmark) Leon Madsen	results
Semifinal 2	7 May	Mureck, Austria Speedway Stadium	(Denmark) Michael Jepsen Jensen	(Denmark) Hans N. Andersen	(Poland) Krzysztof Kasprzak	(Italy) Nicolas Covatti	results
Semifinal 3	15 May	Liberec, Czech Republic Speedway Stadium	(Poland) Mateusz Szczepaniak	(Russia) Artem Laguta	(Finland) Joonas Kylmäkorpi	(Poland) Tomasz Jędrzejak	results
Semifinal 4	15 May	Zarnovica, Slovakia Speedway Stadium	(Sweden) Fredrik Lindgren	(Denmark) Anders Thomsen	(Poland) Przemysław Pawlicki	(Sweden) Thomas H. Jonasson	results
SEC Challenge	27 May	Olching, Germany Stadion Olching	(Poland) Krzysztof Kasprzak	(Denmark) Leon Madsen	(Finland) Joonas Kylmäkorpi	(Poland) Przemysław Pawlicki	results

=== Championship Series ===
A four-event calendar was scheduled for the final series, with events in Germany, Latvia, Russia and Poland.

Round	Date	City and venue	Winner	Runner-up	3rd placed	4th placed	Results
1	16 July	Güstrow, Germany Speedway Stadion	(Slovakia) Martin Vaculík	(Poland) Krzysztof Kasprzak	(Germany) Kai Huckenbeck	(Poland) Janusz Kołodziej	results
2	6 August	Daugavpils, Latvia Spīdveja centrs	(Russia) Grigory Laguta	(Finland) Joonas Kylmäkorpi	(Russia) Emil Sayfutdinov	(Latvia) Maksims Bogdanovs	results
3	20 August	Tolyatti, Russia IMega-Lada Stadium	(Russia) Grigory Laguta	(Sweden) Antonio Lindbäck	(Denmark) Leon Madsen	(Denmark) Hans N. Andersen	results
4	17 September	Rybnik, Poland Stadion Miejski	(Denmark) Nicki Pedersen	(Czech Republic) Václav Milík Jr.	(Poland) Krzysztof Kasprzak	(Russia) Emil Sayfutdinov	results

== Classification ==
Pos.	Rider	Points	(Germany)	(Latvia)	(Russia)	(Poland)
1	(Denmark) (3) Nicki Pedersen	40	7	6	10	17
2	(Czech Republic) (13) Václav Milík	38	8	9	10	11
3	(Poland) (507) Krzysztof Kasprzak	38	11	5	8	14
4	(Russia) (7) Grigory Laguta	37	–	13	14	10
5	(Denmark) (66) Leon Madsen	37	7	8	11	11
6	(Sweden) (85) Antonio Lindbäck	37	8	7	14	8
7	(Russia) (89) Emil Sayfutdinov	35	8	10	5	12
8	(Poland) (59) Przemysław Pawlicki	33	9	9	8	7
9	(Latvia) (29) Andžejs Ļebedevs	26	8	7	6	5
10	(Finland) (610) Joonas Kylmäkorpi	25	–	14	5	6
11	(Slovakia) (54) Martin Vaculík	24	12	4	8	0
12	(Poland) (27) Janusz Kołodziej	24	9	4	6	5
13	(Denmark) (34) Hans N. Andersen	24	7	8	9	–
14	(Denmark) (5) Anders Thomsen	20	6	9	5	0
15	(Sweden) (36) Peter Ljung	16	5	2	3	6
16	(Latvia) (16) Maksims Bogdanovs	11	–	11	–	–
17	(Germany) (15) Kai Huckenbeck	9	9	–	–	–
18	(Poland) (16) Kacper Woryna	6	–	–	–	6
19	(Italy) (78) Nicolás Covatti	5	1	–	–	4
20	(Germany) (16) Tobias Busch	4	4	–	–	–
21	(Russia) (16) Andrey Kudryashov	3	–	–	3	–
22	(Poland) (17) Robert Chmiel	3	–	–	–	3
23	(Germany) (17) Tobias Kroner	1	1	–	–	–
24	(Poland) (18) Dominik Kubera	1	–	–	–	1
25	(Russia) (17) Mikhail Litvinov	0	–	–	0	–
26	(Russia) (18) Gleb Chugunov	0	–	–	0	–

== See also ==
- 2016 Speedway Grand Prix
