= 2013 Speedway Grand Prix Qualification =

Seasons
- ← 2012 2014 →

The 2013 Individual Speedway World Championship Grand Prix Qualification were a series of motorcycle speedway meetings used to determine the three riders who qualified for the 2013 Speedway Grand Prix.

== Qualifying rounds ==
=== Round One ===
- 2 June 2012
- (Austria) St. Johann

Pos.	Rider	Points	Details
1	(Denmark) (9) Leon Madsen	12	(0,3,3,3,3)
2	(Finland) (1) Joonas Kylmakorpi	12	(3,2,1,3,3)
3	(Croatia) (6) Jurica Pavlic	11	(3,1,3,1,3)
4	(Denmark) (16) Patrick Hougaard	11	(3,3,2,2,1)
5	(Sweden) (5) Thomas H. Jonasson	10	(2,1,1,3,3)
6	(Slovenia) (2) Matej Zagar	10	(2,1,2,3,2)
7	(Poland) (14) Adrian Miedzinski	10	(2,2,2,2,2)
8	(Germany) (4) Martin Smolinski	8	(1,2,3,2,0)
9	(United Kingdom) (11) Ben Barker	8	(2,X,3,2,1)
10	(Austria) (8) Dany Gappmaier	7	(3,0,1,1,2)
11	(Sweden) (10) Simon Gustafsson	6	(1,3,2)
12	(Czech Republic) (7) Tomas Suchanek	4	(1,3,0,0,0)
13	(Slovenia) (15) Maks Gregoric	4	(0,2,0,1,1)
14	(Austria) (3) Lukas Simon	3	(0,1,0,F,2)
15	(Czech Republic) (13) Martin Gavenda	3	(1,0,1,0,1)
16	(Poland) (17) Oskar Fajfer	1	(-)
17	(Croatia) (12) Renato Cvetko	0	(0,0,0,F,F)
18	(Austria) (18) Johannes Fiala	0	(-)

=== Round Two ===
- 16 June 2012
- (Germany) Güstrow

Pos.	Rider	Points	Details
1	(Poland) (15) Przemyslaw Pawlicki	12	(3,1,2,3,3)
2	(Sweden) (9) Peter Ljung	11	(3,3,2,2,1)
3	(Latvia) (4) Kjastas Puodzuks	10	(3,2,1,1,3)
4	(Denmark) (7) Mikkel B. Jensen	10	(1,3,3,1,2)
5	(Denmark) (16) Mads Korneliussen	10	(2,3,1,1,3)
6	(Germany) (10) Kevin Wolbert	10	(2,1,2,3,2)
7	(Russia) (6) Renat Gafurov	9	(3,3,0,0,3)
8	(Sweden) (3) Dennis Andersson	9	(2,2,3,0,2)
9	(Denmark) (1) Peter Kildemand	8	(1,2,2,3,0)
10	(Finland) (11) Timo Lahti	7	(1,0,3,2,1)
11	(Germany) (5) Tobias Busch	6	(2,1,1,2,0)
12	(Poland) (8) Piotr Pawlicki	6	(0,1,1,3,1)
13	(United Kingdom) (2) Edward Kennett	5	(X,2,3,0,X)
14	(Australia) (14) Ty Proctor	5	(1,0,0,2,2)
15	(Latvia) (13) Andžejs Ļebedevs	2	(0,0,0,1,1)
16	(Russia) (12) Alexiej Charczenko	0	(X,0,0,-,-)
17	(Germany) (17) Tobias Kroner	0	(0, 0)
—	(Germany) (18) Roberto Haupt	—	—

=== Round Three ===
- 16 June 2012
- (Hungary) Miskolc

Pos.	Rider	Points	Details
1	(Poland) (13) Grzegorz Zengota	15	(3,3,3,3,3)
2	(Poland) (9) Krzysztof Kasprzak	13	(3,1,3,3,3)
3	(Denmark) (4) Kenni Larsen	11	(3,2,2,1,3)
4	(Hungary) (12) Jozsef Tabaka	11	(2,3,2,3,1)
5	(Hungary) (6) Norbert Magosi	11	(2,3,2,2,2)
6	(Slovenia) (8) Aleksander Čonda	10	(3,1,2,1,3)
7	(Italy) (11) Nicolas Covatti	10	(1,2,3,2,2)
8	(Ukraine) (16) Kiril Cukanov	8	(2,EF,1,3,2)
9	(Hungary) (15) Laszlo Szatmari	7	(1,3,3,FX,F)
10	(Czech Republic) (14) Filip Sitera	6	(0,2,1,2,1)
11	(Hungary) (3) Roland Benko	5	(2,1,0,2,0)
12	(Hungary) (5) Sandor Tihanyi	4	(0,2,1,1,FX)
13	(Italy) (1) Cristian Carrica	3	(1,FX,FX,X,2)
14	(Hungary) (7) Zsolt Bencze	2	(1,0,0,FX,1)
15	(Austria) (10) Fritz Wallner	2	(FX,1,1,FX,DNS)
16	(Slovenia) (2) Matic Voldrih	0	(FX,0)

=== Round Four ===
- 16 June 2012
- (Poland) Tarnów

Pos.	Rider	Points	Details
1	(Slovakia) (3) Martin Vaculík	15	(3,3,3,3,3)
2	(Poland) (16) Piotr Protasiewicz	13	(3,2,3,2,3)
3	(Sweden) (2) Antonio Lindbäck	11	(2,1,3,3,2)
4	(Poland) (10) Grzegorz Walasek	11	(2,3,3,1,2)
5	(Poland) (9) Janusz Kolodziej	10	(3,2,2,3,EF)
6	(Denmark) (14) Niels-Kristian Iversen	10	(2,2,1,2,3)
7	(Ukraine) (4) Andriy Karpov	9	(1,3,2,2,1)
8	(Denmark) (11) Hans N. Andersen	9	(2,2,2,2)
9	(Australia) (15) Troy Batchelor	7	(1,1,2,EF,3)
10	(United Kingdom) (8) Oliver Allen	5	(3,1,0,1,0)
11	(Russia) (7) Viktor Golubovskiy	5	(0,0,1,3,1)
12	(Latvia) (6) Maksims Bogdanovs	5	(2,0,EF,1,2)
13	(Sweden) (13) Jonas Davidsson	3	(0,3,0,0,0)
14	(United Kingdom) (1) Lewis Bridger	3	(0,1,1,EF,1)
15	(Czech Republic) (12) Vaclav Milik	3	(0,EF,1,1,1)
16	(Germany) (5) Max Dilger	1	(1,0,0,0,EF)
—	(Poland) (17) Maciej Janowski	—	—

=== Round Five ===
- 16 June 2012
- (United Kingdom) Berwick

Pos.	Rider	Points	Details
1	(United Kingdom) (4) Chris Harris	15	(3,3,3,3,3)
2	(Australia) (1) Sam Masters	12	(2,1,3,3,3)
3	(United Kingdom) (13) Daniel King	12	(3,3,Fx,3,3)
4	(United States) (9) Ryan Fisher	11	(2,2,2,2,3)
5	(Australia) (12) Davey Watt	10	(3,2,3,2,R)
6	(Poland) (3) Krzysztof Buczkowski	9	(1,3,F,3,2)
7	(Sweden) (14) Linus Sundström	9	(2,3,3,1,F)
8	(Finland) (11) Tero Aarnio	9	(1,2,2,2,2)
9	(Denmark) (8) Kenneth Hansen	7	(3,1,1,0,2)
10	(Argentina) (2) Emiliano Sanchez	5	(0,Xt,2,1,2)
11	(Italy) (5) Guglielmo Franchetti	4	(2,0,0,1,1)
12	(Netherlands) (7) Henry Van Der Steen	4	(0,1,2,0,1)
13	(Argentina) (15) Facundo Albin	4	(1,0,1,1,1)
14	(United States) (16) Kenny Ingalls	3	(0,0,1,2,0)
15	(United Kingdom) (17) Lee Complin	2	(2)
16	(Germany) (6) Marcel Helfer	2	(1,0,0,0,1)
17	(Czech Republic) (10) Matej Kus	2	(0,1,1,Fx,F)
—	(United Kingdom) (18) Ricky Ashworth	—	—

== Race-offs ==
=== Race-off One ===
- 30 June 2012
- (Denmark) Vojens

Pos.	Rider	Points	Details
1	(Denmark) (8) Niels-Kristian Iversen	14	(3,3,3,2,3)
2	(Denmark) (11) Michael Jepsen Jensen	12	(1,3,2,3,3)
3	(Australia) (1) Davey Watt	11	(3,0,3,3,2)
4	(Poland) (9) Grzegorz Walasek	11	(3,3,1,3,1)
5	(Poland) (6) Adrian Miedzinski	10+3	(1,3,1,2,3)
6	(Denmark) (2) Mikkel B. Jensen	10+2	(2,2,3,1,2)
7	(Sweden) (7) Dennis Andersson	9	(0,1,3,2,3)
8	(Sweden) (3) Thomas H. Jonasson	8	(1,2,2,2,1)
9	(Poland) (5) Przemyslaw Pawlicki	7	(2,2,1,FX,2)
10	(Russia) (12) Renat Gafurov	7	(2,2,2,1,R)
11	(Sweden) (13) Linus Sundstrom	6	(3,1,X,0,2)
12	(United States) (4) Ryan Fisher	4	(0,0,2,1,1)
13	(Ukraine) (10) Kiril Cukanov	4	(0,0,1,3,0)
14	(Finland) (14) Timo Lahti	3	(2,1,0,0,0)
15	(Germany) (15) Kevin Wolbert	2	(1,0,0,0,1)
16	(Finland) (16) Tero Aarnio	2	(0,1,0,1,0)
—	(Sweden) (17) Simon Gustafsson	—	—

=== Race-off Three ===
- 30 June 2012
- (Czech Republic) Divisov

Pos.	Rider	Points	Details
1	(Czech Republic) (16) Aleš Dryml, Jr.	12+3	(2,1,3,3,3)
2	(Poland) (12) Krzysztof Kasprzak	12+2	(3,2,3,2,2)
3	(Sweden) (4) Peter Ljung	11	(3,3,3,2,Fx)
4	(Slovakia) (7) Martin Vaculik	10	(3,2,1,3,1)
5	(Australia) (1) Troy Batchelor	10	(2,2,2,1,1)
6	(Poland) (3) Krzysztof Buczkowski	9 + 3	(1,1,2,2,3)
7	(Denmark) (2) Kenni Larsen	9 + 2	(0,2,2,3,2)
8	(Latvia) (15) Kjastas Puodzuks	9 + Fx	(3,3,0,1,2)
9	(Finland) (9) Joonas Kylmakorpi	8	(2,3,3,0,0)
10	(Ukraine) (14) Andriej Karpov	7	(1,3,1,0,2)
11	(United Kingdom) (6) Chris Harris	7	(2,1,T,3,1)
12	(Croatia) (5) Jurica Pavlic	6	(1,1,1,R,3)
13	(Denmark) (10) Mads Korneliussen	4	(T,0,2,1,1)
14	(Czech Republic) (11) Filip Sitera	4	(1,R,1,1,1)
15	(Denmark) (13) Kenneth Hansen	2	(0,0,0,2,0)
16	(Hungary) (8) Jozsef Tabaka	0	(R,0,0,X,0)
—	(United Kingdom) (17) Oliver Allen	—	(—)

=== Race-off Two ===
- 30 June 2012
- (Italy) Lonigo

Pos.	Rider	Points	Details
1	(Sweden) (7) Antonio Lindbäck	12	(2,2,3,3,2)
2	(Denmark) (14) Leon Madsen	11	(3,3,3,0,2)
3	(Slovenia) (16) Matej Zagar	11	(1,3,1,3,3)
4	(Germany) (5) Martin Smolinski	11	(3,3,2,2,1)
5	(Denmark) (12) Hans N. Andersen	11	(3,2,3,2,1)
6	(Denmark) (11) Peter Kildemand	10+3	(2,3,0,2,3)
7	(United Kingdom) (1) Ben Barker	10+2	(3,1,2,1,3)
8	(Italy) (13) Nicolas Covatti	9	(0,2,2,3,2)
9	(Hungary) (6) Norbert Magosi	8	(0,2,3,3,0)
10	(United Kingdom) (15) Daniel King	7	(2,0,1,2,2)
11	(Australia) (3) Sam Masters	6	(EF,1,1,1,3)
12	(Italy) (8) Mattia Carpanese	6	(1,0,2,2,1)
13	(Poland) (4) Grzegorz Zengota	5	(2,1,1,1,0)
14	(Hungary) (2) Laszlo Szatmari	1	(1,0,R,N,N)
15	(Poland) (9) Piotr Protasiewicz	1	(1,EF,R,0,N)
16	(Hungary) (10) Aleksander Čonda	1	(0,1,0,0,0)
17	(Argentina) (18) Emiliano Sanchez	1	(1)
18	(Austria) (17) Dany Gappmaier	0	(FX,R)

== Grand Prix Challenge ==
- 29 September 2012
- (Croatia) Goričan

Pos.	Rider	Points	Details
1	(Poland) (2) Krzysztof Kasprzak	11	(3,1,3,1,3)
2	(Slovenia) (10) Matej Zagar	10	(1,3,3,2,1)
3	(Denmark) (11) Niels-Kristian Iversen	10	(3,2,2,2,1)
4	(Czech Republic) (13) Aleš Dryml, Jr.	10	(1,2,2,3,2)
5	(Denmark) (1) Leon Madsen	10	(1,3,1,2,3)
6	(Australia) (7) Troy Batchelor	10	(3,3,0,3,1)
7	(Denmark) (12) Hans N. Andersen	8	(2,3,0,EF,3)
8	(Sweden) (9) Peter Ljung	8	(0,1,3,2,2)
9	(Poland) (3) Krzysztof Buczkowski	8	(2,1,1,3,1)
10	(Slovakia) (4) Martin Vaculik	8	(0,2,1,3,2)
11	(Germany) (5) Martin Smolinski	7	(1,0,2,1,3)
12	(Poland) (14) Grzegorz Walasek	6	(3,0,2,1,0)
13	(Denmark) (6) Peter Kildemand	5	(2,2,X,1,0)
14	(Croatia) (15) Jurica Pavlic	5	(2,F,1,0,2)
15	(Poland) (16) Adrian Miedzinski	4	(FX,1,3,0,0)
16	(Denmark) (8) Michael Jepsen Jensen	0	(0,0,0,0,0)
—	(Denmark) (17) Mikkel B. Jensen	—	(—)
—	(United Kingdom) (18) Ben Barker	—	(—)

== See also ==
- 2012 Speedway Grand Prix
