= 2013 Speedway Grand Prix of Italy =

Speedway Grand Prix event

- Venue: Pista Olimpia Terenzano
- Location: Terenzano, Italy
- Start date: 3 August 2013
- Competitors: 16 (2 reserves)

The 2013 Speedway Grand Prix of Italy was the eighth round of the 2013 Speedway Grand Prix season (the world championship). It took place on 3 August 2013 at the Pista Olimpia Terenzano in Terenzano, Italy.

It was the 10th time that the Speedway Grand Prix of Italy had been held.

The Grand Prix was by the Danish rider Niels Kristian Iversen (his inaugural career Grand Prix win).

== Grand Prix result ==
Placing	Rider	1	2	3	4	5	6	7	8	9	10	11	12	13	14	15	16	17	18	19	20	Pts	SF1	SF2	Final	GP Pts
1	(Denmark) (8) Niels Kristian Iversen		3						0			x			3			2				8	2		3	13
2	(United Kingdom) (14) Tai Woffinden				2		2					3		3							3	13	3		2	18
3	(Russia) (3) Emil Sayfutdinov	0						3				2				1				1		7		2	1	10
4	(Slovenia) (4) Matej Žagar	3							3				1				2				2	11		3	0	14
5	(Denmark) (2) Nicki Pedersen	2					3				3				2				1			11	1			12
6	(Poland) (15) Jarosław Hampel				3			2			1						3	3				12		1		13
7	(Australia) (12) Darcy Ward			3					2		2			1						3		11		e		11
8	(Denmark) (10) Leon Madsen			1			1						3			2		1				8	0			8
9	(Poland) (7) Tomasz Gollob		0					1					e	2					3			6				6
10	(Sweden) (16) Freddie Lindgren				1				1	2						0			2			6				6
11	(Sweden) (13) Antonio Lindbäck				0	2							2		0					2		6				6
12	(Slovakia) (11) Martin Vaculík			2				0		1					1						1	5				5
13	(Poland) (9) Krzysztof Kasprzak			0		3						1					1		e			5				5
14	(United States) (5) Greg Hancock		2			0					0					3					0	5				5
15	(Czech Republic) (6) Aleš Dryml Jr.		1				0			3							0			0		4				4
16	(Italy) (1) Nico Covatti	1				1				0				x				ns				2				2
R1	(Italy) (R1) Nicolas Vicentin																	0				0	R1			
R2	(Italy) (R2) Paco Castagna																					0	R2			

m - exclusion for exceeding two minute time allowance • t - exclusion for touching the tapes • x - other exclusion • e - retired or mechanical failure • f - fell • ns - non-starter • nc - non-classify

gate A - inside	gate B	gate C	gate D - outside
