= Italian Grand Prix (disambiguation) =

Italian Grand Prix can refer to:

- Italian Grand Prix, a Formula One motor race
- Italian motorcycle Grand Prix
- Speedway Grand Prix of Italy
