= 2013 Speedway Grand Prix of Czech Republic =

Speedway Grand Prix event

- Venue: Markéta Stadium
- Location: Prague (Czech Republic)
- Start date: 18 May 2013
- Competitors: 16 (2 reserves)

The 2013 Speedway Grand Prix of Czech Republic was the fourth round of the 2013 Speedway Grand Prix season (the world championship). It took place on 18 May at the Markéta Stadium in Prague, Czech Republic.

It was the 17th time that the Speedway Grand Prix of Czech Republic had been held.

The Grand Prix was by the English rider Tai Woffinden (his inaugural career Grand Prix win).

== Grand Prix result ==
Placing	Rider	1	2	3	4	5	6	7	8	9	10	11	12	13	14	15	16	17	18	19	20	Pts	SF1	SF2	Final	GP Pts
1	(United Kingdom) (10) Tai Woffinden			3			3						3			3		1				13		3	3	19
2	(Poland) (5) Krzysztof Kasprzak		1			2					3					1					1	8	2		2	12
3	(Denmark) (7) Nicki Pedersen		3					1					0	3					1			8		2	1	11
4	(Russia) (8) Emil Sayfutdinov		2						3			3			3			3				14	3		0	17
5	(Sweden) (9) Freddie Lindgren			2		1						2					3		2			10	1			11
6	(Poland) (11) Jarosław Hampel			0				3		1					0						3	7		1		8
7	(Slovenia) (1) Matej Žagar	3				3				2				2				0				10		0		10
8	(Sweden) (12) Andreas Jonsson			1					2		2			1						3		9	0			9
9	(United States) (15) Greg Hancock				2			2			1						0	2				7				7
10	(Denmark) (2) Niels Kristian Iversen	2					1				0				1				3			7				7
11	(Australia) (14) Chris Holder				3		2					0		0							2	7				7
12	(Slovakia) (16) Martin Vaculík				1				e	3						2			0			6				6
13	(Sweden) (13) Antonio Lindbäck				0	0							2		2					1		5				5
14	(Czech Republic) (4) Aleš Dryml Jr.	1							1				1				1				0	4				4
15	(Poland) (3) Tomasz Gollob	0						0				1				0				2		3				3
16	(Czech Republic) (6) Josef Franc		0				0			0							2			0		2				2
R1	(Czech Republic) (R1) Václav Milík Jr.																					0	R1			
R2	(Czech Republic) (R2) Zdeněk Holub																					0	R2			

m - exclusion for exceeding two minute time allowance • t - exclusion for touching the tapes • x - other exclusion • e - retired or mechanical failure • f - fell • ns - non-starter • nc - non-classify

gate A - inside	gate B	gate C	gate D - outside
