= 2013 Speedway Grand Prix of Denmark =

Speedway Grand Prix event

- Venue: Parken Stadium
- Location: Copenhagen
- Start date: 29 June
- Competitors: 16 (2 reserves)

The 2013 FIM Speedway Grand Prix of Denmark was the seventh round of the 2013 Speedway Grand Prix season (the World Championship).

The event took place on 29 June at the Parken Stadium in Copenhagen.

The round was the 19th Speedway Grand Prix of Denmark.

The Grand Prix was won by the Australian rider Darcy Ward (which was his only career Grand Prix win before he received life changing injuries in 2015).

== Grand Prix result ==
Placing	Rider	1	2	3	4	5	6	7	8	9	10	11	12	13	14	15	16	17	18	19	20	Pts	SF1	SF2	Final	GP Pts
1	(Australia) (13) Darcy Ward				2	3							2		3					3		13	3		3	19
2	(Slovenia) (9) Matej Žagar			x		1						3					2		2			8		3	2	13
3	(Australia) (10) Chris Holder			1			3						3			2		2				11	2		1	14
4	(Poland) (7) Tomasz Gollob		0					2					0	3					3			8		2	0	10
5	(Russia) (12) Emil Sayfutdinov			3					3		3			1						2		12		1		13
6	(United Kingdom) (1) Tai Woffinden	1				2				3				2				3				11		0		11
7	(United States) (3) Greg Hancock	3						3				0				1				1		8	1			9
8	(Sweden) (6) Freddie Lindgren		2				2			1							3			f		8	ns			8
9	(Denmark) (14) Nicki Pedersen				3		1					2		0							1	7				7
10	(Poland) (5) Jarosław Hampel		1			0					0					3					2	6				6
11	(Slovakia) (16) Martin Vaculík				1				2	2						e			1			6				6
12	(Poland) (2) Krzysztof Kasprzak	2					0				2				2				0			6				6
13	(Denmark) (4) Michael Jepsen Jensen	0							1				1				1				3	6				6
14	(Denmark) (8) Niels Kristian Iversen		3						0			1			0			0				4				4
15	(Sweden) (15) Antonio Lindbäck				0			0			1						0	1				2				2
16	(Sweden) (11) Andreas Jonsson			FN				-		-					-						-	0				0
R1	(Denmark) (R1) Peter Kildemand			2						0											0	2	R1			
R2	(Denmark) (R2) Kenni Larsen							1							1							2	R2			

m - exclusion for exceeding two minute time allowance • t - exclusion for touching the tapes • x - other exclusion • e - retired or mechanical failure • f - fell • ns - non-starter • nc - non-classify

gate A - inside	gate B	gate C	gate D - outside
