= 2013 Speedway Grand Prix of Slovenia =

Speedway Grand Prix event

- Venue: Matija Gubec Stadium
- Location: Krško, (Slovenia)
- Start date: 7 September 2013
- Competitors: 16 (2 reserves)

The 2013 Speedway Grand Prix of Slovenia was the tenth round of the 2013 Speedway Grand Prix season (the world championship). It took place on 7 September 2013 at the Matija Gubec Stadium in Krško, (Slovenia).

It was the 9th time that the Speedway Grand Prix of Slovenia had been held and the first since 2009.

The Grand Prix was by the Polish rider Jarosław Hampel (his fifth career Grand Prix win).

== Grand Prix result ==
Placing	Rider	1	2	3	4	5	6	7	8	9	10	11	12	13	14	15	16	17	18	19	20	Pts	SF1	SF2	Final	GP Pts
1	(Poland) (2) Jarosław Hampel	3					1				0				3				3			10	3		3	16
2	(United Kingdom) (12) Tai Woffinden			3					3		3			2						2		13	2		2	17
3	(Poland) (5) Tomasz Gollob		3			1					2					3					3	12		3	1	16
4	(Denmark) (15) Niels Kristian Iversen				3			3			1						2	0				9		2	0	11
5	(Denmark) (9) Nicki Pedersen			2		3						3					3		2			13		1		14
6	(Australia) (11) Darcy Ward			1				2		2					2						2	9	1			10
7	(United States) (3) Greg Hancock	2						1				1				2				3		9	0			9
8	(Slovenia) (1) Matej Žagar	1				0				1				3				3				8		0		8
9	(Poland) (13) Krzysztof Kasprzak				2	2							3		1					0		8				8
10	(Sweden) (8) Freddie Lindgren		2						2			2			0			2				8				8
11	(Sweden) (6) Antonio Lindbäck		0				2			3							1			1		7				7
12	(Slovakia) (14) Martin Vaculík				1		3					0		1							0	5				5
13	(Sweden) (7) Andreas Jonsson		1					0					1	0					1			3				3
14	(Slovenia) (10) Aleksander Čonda			0			0						2			0		1				3				3
15	(Czech Republic) (16) Aleš Dryml Jr.				0				1	0						1			0			2				2
16	(Denmark) (4) Leon Madsen	0							0				0				0				1	1				1
R1	(Slovenia) (R1) Denis Štojs																					0	R1			
R2	(Slovenia) (R2) Matic Voldrih																					0	R2			

m - exclusion for exceeding two minute time allowance • t - exclusion for touching the tapes • x - other exclusion • e - retired or mechanical failure • f - fell • ns - non-starter • nc - non-classify

gate A - inside	gate B	gate C	gate D - outside
