= 2013 Speedway Grand Prix =

Speedway world championship

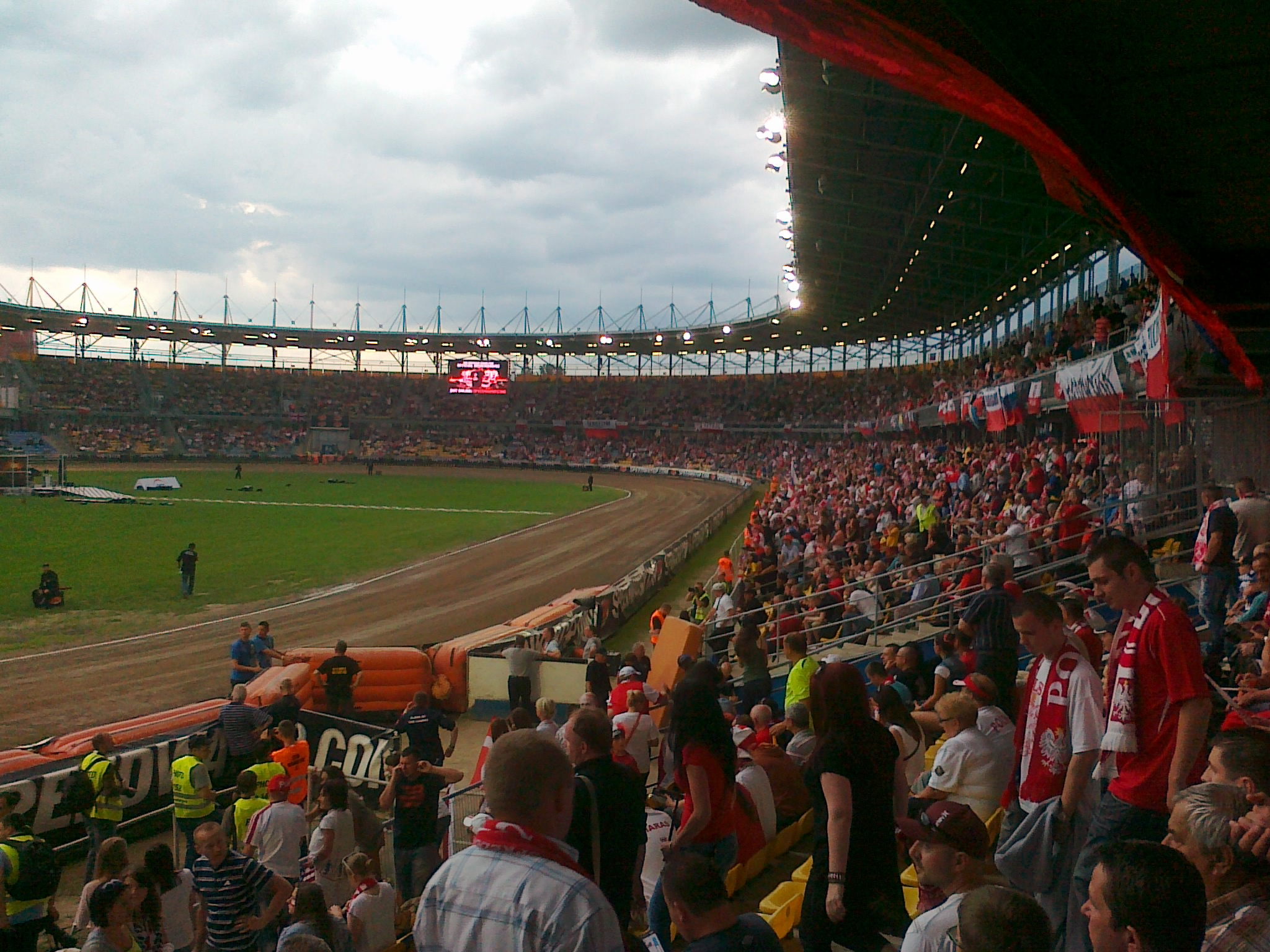
- Gorzów Grand Prix on 15 June

Season details
- Dates: 23 March — 5 October
- Events: 12
- Cities: 12
- Countries: 9
- Riders: 15 permanents 1 wild card(s); 2 track reserves
- Heats: 276 (in 12 events)

Winners
- Champion: GBR Tai Woffinden
- Runner-up: POL Jarosław Hampel
- 3rd place: DEN Niels Kristian Iversen

The 2013 Speedway Grand Prix season was the 68th edition of the official World Championship and the 19th season of the Speedway Grand Prix era, deciding the FIM Speedway World Championship. It was the thirteenth series under the promotion of Benfield Sports International, an IMG company.

The British rider Tai Woffinden became world champion, making him the first British rider to win the gold medal since Mark Loram in the 2000 Speedway Grand Prix. Jarosław Hampel won his third world championship medal, while Danish rider Niels Kristian Iversen won his first medal finishing third in the series.

== Qualification ==
For the 2013 season there were 15 permanent riders, joined at each Grand Prix by one wild card and two track reserves.

Since Jason Crump decided to retire from the series, the top eight riders – except Crump, who was replaced by ninth-placed Andreas Jonsson – from the 2012 championship qualified. Those riders were joined by three riders who qualified via the Grand Prix Challenge.

The final four riders were nominated by series promoters, Benfield Sports International, following the completion of the 2012 season.

=== Qualified riders ===
#	Riders	2012 place	GP Ch place	Appearance	Previous appearances in series
1	(Australia) Chris Holder	1	—	4th	2010–2012
2	(Denmark) Nicki Pedersen	2	—	13th	2000, 2001–2012
3	(United States) Greg Hancock	3	—	19th	1995–2012
4	(Poland) Tomasz Gollob	4	—	18th	1995, 1996, 1997–2012
5	(Russia) Emil Sayfutdinov	5	—	5th	2009–2012
6	(Sweden) Antonio Lindbäck	7	F	6th	2004, 2005–2007, 2009–2010, 2011–2012
7	(Sweden) Fredrik Lindgren	8	—	6th	2004, 2006–2007, 2008–2012
8	(Sweden) Andreas Jonsson	9	—	12th	2001, 2002–2012
9	(Slovakia) Martin Vaculík	11	8	1st	2012
10	(Poland) Jarosław Hampel	14	—	8th	2000–2002, 2004–2007, 2008–2009, 2010–2012
11	(Poland) Krzysztof Kasprzak	18	1	2nd	2004–2007, 2008, 2012
12	(Slovenia) Matej Žagar	—	2	3rd	2003–2005, 2006–2007, 2008–2009, 2011
13	(Denmark) Niels Kristian Iversen	—	3	3rd	2004–2005, 2006, 2008, 2009–2010
14	(United Kingdom) Tai Woffinden	—	—	2nd	2010, 2011
15	(Australia) Darcy Ward	—	—	1st	2011

=== Qualified substitutes ===
The following riders qualified as substitutes due to their results in the Grand Prix Challenge.

#	Riders	2012 place	GP Ch place
19	(Czech Republic) (19) Aleš Dryml, Jr.	—	4
20	(Denmark) (20) Leon Madsen	—	5
21	(Australia) (21) Troy Batchelor	—	6
22	(Denmark) (22) Hans N. Andersen	10	7
23	(Sweden) (23) Peter Ljung	15	9

=== Crump spot controversy ===
Before the Toruń event in 2012, former three-times World Champion, Jason Crump announced his retirement at the end of the 2012 season.

According to the SGP Regulation, Crump's spot for the 2013 season – as sixth place in 2012 – should be taken by the first Qualified Substitute, Aleš Dryml, Jr. However, BSI has announced that Crump's spot would be awarded to Andreas Jonsson, the ninth-place finisher in the 2012 standings, per FIM regulations.

… Should a rider or riders who have qualified directly, either by being in the top 8 of the Final Overall Grand Prix Classification or in the top 3 of the FIM Grand Prix qualification system or who qualified through both systems, withdraw prior to the start of the Grand Prix season, the first rider or riders available on the Official Grand Prix Qualified Substitute list shall replace him or them.

— Speedway Grand Prix Regulation, Rule 077.8.5, FIM (pages 22–23)

== Calendar ==
The 2013 season consisted of 12 events, just like the 2012 Speedway Grand Prix.

Round	Date	City and venue	Winner	Runner-up	3rd placed	4th placed	Results
1	23 March	(New Zealand) Auckland, New Zealand; Western Springs Stadium	(Poland) Jarosław Hampel	(Poland) Tomasz Gollob	(Denmark) Nicki Pedersen	(United States) Greg Hancock	results
2	20 April	Bydgoszcz, Poland; Polonia Stadium	(Russia) Emil Sayfutdinov	(Slovenia) Matej Žagar	(Poland) Tomasz Gollob	(United Kingdom) Tai Woffinden	results
3	4 May	(Sweden) Gothenburg, Sweden; Ullevi	(Russia) Emil Sayfutdinov	(Australia) Chris Holder	(Denmark) Nicki Pedersen	(Poland) Jaroslaw Hampel	results
4	18 May	(Czech Republic) Prague, Czech Republic; Markéta Stadium	(United Kingdom) Tai Woffinden	(Poland) Krzysztof Kasprzak	(Denmark) Nicki Pedersen	(Russia) Emil Sayfutdinov	results
5	1 June	(United Kingdom) Cardiff, Great Britain; Millennium Stadium	(Russia) Emil Sayfutdinov	(Denmark) Niels Kristian Iversen	(Poland) Krzysztof Kasprzak	(Sweden) Fredrik Lindgren	results
6	15 June	(Poland) Gorzów Wlkp., Poland; Jancarz Stadium	(Poland) Jarosław Hampel	(Australia) Chris Holder	(United Kingdom) Tai Woffinden	(United States) Greg Hancock	results
7	29 June	(Denmark) Copenhagen, Denmark; Parken Stadium	(Australia) Darcy Ward	(Slovenia) Matej Zagar	(Australia) Chris Holder	(Poland) Tomasz Gollob	results
8	3 August	(Italy) Terenzano, Italy; Pista Olimpia Terenzano	(Denmark) Niels Kristian Iversen	(United Kingdom) Tai Woffinden	(Russia) Emil Sayfutdinov	(Slovenia) Matej Žagar	results
9	17 August	(Latvia) Daugavpils, Latvia; Latvijas Spīdveja Centrs	(United States) Greg Hancock	(Australia) Darcy Ward	(United Kingdom) Tai Woffinden	(Denmark) Nicki Pedersen	results
10	7 September	(Slovenia) Krško, Slovenia; Matija Gubec Stadium	(Poland) Jarosław Hampel	(United Kingdom) Tai Woffinden	(Poland) Tomasz Gollob	(Denmark) Niels Kristian Iversen	results
11	21 September	Stockholm, Sweden; Friends Arena	(Denmark) Niels Kristian Iversen	(Slovenia) Matej Žagar	(Poland) Jarosław Hampel	(United States) Greg Hancock	results
12	5 October	Toruń, Poland; Rose Motoarena	(Poland) Adrian Miedzinski	(United States) Greg Hancock	(Poland) Jaroslaw Hampel	(Denmark) Niels-Kristian Iversen	results

== Classification ==
Qualifies for next season's Grand Prix series
Full-time Grand Prix rider
Wild card, track reserve or qualified reserve

Pos.	Rider	Points	NZL (New Zealand)	EUR (Poland)	SWE (Sweden)	CZE (Czech Republic)	GBR (United Kingdom)	POL (Poland)	DEN (Denmark)	ITA (Italy)	LAT (Latvia)	SVN (Slovenia)	SCA (Sweden)	PL2 (Poland)
Gold	(United Kingdom) (14) Tai Woffinden	151	9	14	12	19	7	12	11	18	15	17	7	10
Silver	(Poland) (10) Jarosław Hampel	142	15	8	15	8	6	14	6	13	11	16	13	17
Bronze	(Denmark) (13) Niels Kristian Iversen	132	7	9	10	7	16	11	4	13	13	11	18	13
4	(United States) (3) Greg Hancock	129	11	8	8	7	11	12	9	5	18	9	13	18
5	(Denmark) (2) Nicki Pedersen	121	12	10	12	11	11	8	7	12	11	14	5	8
6	(Russia) (5) Emil Sayfutdinov	114	6	15	17	17	14	15	13	10	7	–	–	–
7	(Slovenia) (12) Matej Žagar	110	5	14	9	10	3	7	13	14	9	8	15	3
8	(Australia) (15) Darcy Ward	106	12	13	0	–	–	–	19	11	13	10	15	13
9	(Poland) (4) Tomasz Gollob	89	15	16	9	3	5	4	10	6	5	16	0	–
10	(Poland) (11) Krzysztof Kasprzak	89	6	0	7	12	13	10	6	5	3	8	10	9
11	(Sweden) (7) Fredrik Lindgren	83	8	4	5	11	12	7	8	6	4	8	8	2
12	(Australia) (1) Chris Holder	82	9	10	14	7	14	14	14	–	–	–	–	–
13	(Sweden) (8) Andreas Jonsson	64	11	4	3	9	3	9	0	–	7	3	10	5
14	(Slovakia) (9) Martin Vaculík	62	5	4	3	6	11	4	6	5	7	5	0	6
15	(Sweden) (6) Antonio Lindbäck	51	6	3	8	5	1	3	2	6	1	7	3	6
16	(Denmark) (20) Leon Madsen	30	–	–	–	–	–	–	–	8	5	1	9	7
17	(Czech Republic) (19) Ales Dryml	17	–	–	–	4	2	2	–	4	–	2	3	0
18	(Poland) (16) Adrian Miedzinski	15	–	–	–	–	–	–	–	–	–	–	–	15
19	(Latvia) (16) Andzejs Lebedevs	9	–	–	–	–	–	–	–	–	9	–	–	–
20	(United Kingdom) (16) Chris Harris	7	–	–	–	–	7	–	–	–	–	–	–	–
21	(Denmark) (16) Michael Jepsen Jensen	6	–	–	–	–	–	–	6	–	–	–	–	–
22	(Sweden) (16) Linus Sundström	6	–	–	6	–	–	–	–	–	–	–	–	–
23	(Poland) (16) Krzysztof Buczkowski	6	–	6	–	–	–	–	–	–	–	–	–	–
24	(Poland) (16) Bartosz Zmarzlik	6	–	–	–	–	–	6	–	–	–	–	–	–
25	(Australia) (21) Troy Batchelor	6	–	–	–	–	–	–	–	–	–	–	–	6
26	(Sweden) (17) Fredrik Engman	4	–	–	–	–	–	–	–	–	–	–	4	–
27	(Slovenia) (16) Aleksander Conda	3	–	–	–	–	–	–	–	–	–	3	–	–
28	(Sweden) (18) Oliver Berntzon	3	–	–	–	–	–	–	–	–	–	–	3	–
29	(Italy) (16) Nicolas Covatti	2	–	–	–	–	–	–	–	2	–	–	–	–
30	(Sweden) (16) Kim Nilsson	2	–	–	–	–	–	–	–	–	–	–	2	–
31	(Czech Republic) (16) Josef Franc	2	–	–	–	2	–	–	–	–	–	–	–	–
32	(Denmark) (17) Peter Kildemand	2	–	–	–	–	–	–	2	–	–	–	–	–
33	(Denmark) (18) Kenni Larsen	2	–	–	–	–	–	–	2	–	–	–	–	–
34	(New Zealand) (16) Jason Bunyan	1	1	–	–	–	–	–	–	–	–	–	–	–
35	(United Kingdom) (17) Craig Cook	1	–	–	–	–	1	–	–	–	–	–	–	–
36	(United Kingdom) (18) Josh Auty	1	–	–	–	–	1	–	–	–	–	–	–	–
37	(Sweden) (17) Dennis Andersson	0	–	–	0	–	–	–	–	–	–	–	–	–
38	(Sweden) (18) Mathias Thornblom	0	–	–	0	–	–	–	–	–	–	–	–	–
39	(Italy) (17) Nicolas Vicentin	0	–	–	–	–	–	–	–	0	–	–	–	–
Rider(s) not classified
	(New Zealand) (17) Dale Finch	—	ns	–	–	–	–	–	–	–	–	–	–	–
	(New Zealand) (18) Sean Mason	—	ns	–	–	–	–	–	–	–	–	–	–	–
	(Poland) (17) Szymon Woźniak	—	–	ns	–	–	–	–	–	–	–	–	–	–
	(Poland) (18) Mikołaj Curyło	—	–	ns	–	–	–	–	–	–	–	–	–	–
	(Czech Republic) (17) Vaclav Milik	—	–	–	–	ns	–	–	–	–	–	–	–	–
	(Czech Republic) (18) Zdenek Holub	—	–	–	–	ns	–	–	–	–	–	–	–	–
	(Poland) (17) Adrian Cyfer	—	–	–	–	–	–	ns	–	–	–	–	–	–
	(Poland) (18) Lukasz Cyran	—	–	–	–	–	–	ns	–	–	–	–	–	–
	(Italy) (18) Michele Paco Castagna	—	–	–	–	–	–	–	–	ns	–	–	–	–
	(Latvia) (17) Kasts Puodzuks	—	–	–	–	–	–	–	–	–	ns	–	–	–
	(Latvia) (18) Maksims Bogdanovs	—	–	–	–	–	–	–	–	–	ns	–	–	–
	(Slovenia) (17) Matic Voldrih	—	–	–	–	–	–	–	–	–	–	ns	–	–
	(Slovenia) (18) Denis Stojs	—	–	–	–	–	–	–	–	–	–	ns	–	–
	(Poland) (17) Paweł Przedpełski	—	–	–	–	–	–	–	–	–	–	–	–	ns
	(Poland) (18) Kamil Pulczynski	—	–	–	–	–	–	–	–	–	–	–	–	ns
Pos.	Rider	Points	NZL (New Zealand)	EUR (Poland)	SWE (Sweden)	CZE (Czech Republic)	GBR (United Kingdom)	POL (Poland)	DEN (Denmark)	ITA (Italy)	LAT (Latvia)	SVN (Slovenia)	SCA (Sweden)	PL2 (Poland)

== See also ==
- 2013 Individual Speedway Junior World Championship
