= 2013 Speedway Grand Prix of Latvia =

Speedway Grand Prix event

- Venue: Stadium Lokomotīve
- Location: Daugavpils (Latvia)
- Start date: 17 August 2013
- Competitors: 16 (2 reserves)

The 2013 Speedway Grand Prix of Latvia was the ninth round of the 2013 Speedway Grand Prix season (the world championship). It took place on 17 August at the Stadium Lokomotīve in Daugavpils, Latvia.

It was the fifth time that the Speedway Grand Prix of Latvia had been held and the first since 2009.

The Grand Prix was by the American rider Greg Hancock (his 17th career Grand Prix win).

== Grand Prix result ==
Placing	Rider	1	2	3	4	5	6	7	8	9	10	11	12	13	14	15	16	17	18	19	20	Pts	SF1	SF2	Final	GP Pts
1	(United States) (13) Greg Hancock				3	3							2		2					2		12		3	3	18
2	(Australia) (8) Darcy Ward		3						2			0			3			1				9		2	2	13
3	(United Kingdom) (3) Tai Woffinden	2						3				3				2				1		11	3		1	15
4	(Denmark) (6) Nicki Pedersen		0				2			1							3			3		9	2		t	11
5	(Slovenia) (12) Matej Žagar			3					1		2			2						e		8	1			9
6	(Latvia) (11) Andžejs Ļebedevs			2				0		3					1						2	8		1		9
7	(Poland) (5) Jarosław Hampel		2			0					3					3					3	11		0		11
8	(Denmark) (1) Niels Kristian Iversen	3				2				2				3				3				13	f			13
9	(Russia) (7) Emil Sayfutdinov		1					2					3	1					f			7				7
10	(Sweden) (15) Andreas Jonsson				2			1			1						1	2				7				7
11	(Slovakia) (16) Martin Vaculík				1				3	0						0			3			7				7
12	(Denmark) (9) Leon Madsen			0		1						1					2		1			5				5
13	(Poland) (2) Tomasz Gollob	0					3				e				0				2			5				5
14	(Sweden) (14) Freddie Lindgren				0		1					2		0							1	4				4
15	(Poland) (10) Krzysztof Kasprzak			1			e						1			1		0				3				3
16	(Sweden) (4) Antonio Lindbäck	1							0				0				0				t	1				1
R1	(Latvia) (R1) Vjačeslavs Giruckis																				0	0	R1			
R2	(Latvia) (R2) Maksims Bogdanovs																					0	R2			

m - exclusion for exceeding two minute time allowance • t - exclusion for touching the tapes • x - other exclusion • e - retired or mechanical failure • f - fell • ns - non-starter • nc - non-classify

gate A - inside	gate B	gate C	gate D - outside
