= Speedway Grand Prix of Italy =

Speedway event

(Italy) FIM Italian Speedway Grand Prix
- Stadium: Santa Marina Stadium; Lonigo; Pista Olimpia Terenzano, Terenzano
- Years: 10 (1996, 2005-2013)
- Track: speedway track
- Track Length: 400 m

Last Event (season 2013)
- Date: 3 August 2013

The Speedway Grand Prix of Italy (SGP) is a speedway event that is a part of the Speedway Grand Prix Series.

== History ==
The first ever Italian SGP was held in the 1996 season and was won by Dane Hans Nielsen. The next SGP was held nine years later in 2005. The first five events were held at Santa Marina Stadium in Lonigo. From 2009 to 2013 the Italian SGP was hosted at Pista Olimpia Terenzano in Terenzano.

== Results ==
=== Santa Marina Stadium, Lonigo ===
Year	Edition	Winners	Runner-up	3rd place	Ref
1996	1	(Denmark) Hans Nielsen	(United States) Billy Hamill	(Sweden) Tony Rickardsson	
2005	2	(Sweden) Tony Rickardsson	(Australia) Jason Crump	(United States) Greg Hancock	
2006	3	(Australia) Jason Crump	(United Kingdom) Scott Nicholls	(Denmark) Hans N. Andersen	
2007	4	(Denmark) Nicki Pedersen	(United States) Greg Hancock	(Poland) Wiesław Jaguś	
2008	5	(Denmark) Hans N. Andersen	(Denmark) Bjarne Pedersen	(Australia) Jason Crump	

=== Pista Olimpia, Terenzano ===
Year	Edition	Winners	Runner-up	3rd place	Ref
2009	6	(Poland) Tomasz Gollob	(Denmark) Hans N. Andersen	(Denmark) Nicki Pedersen	
2010	7	(Poland) Tomasz Gollob	(United Kingdom) Chris Harris	(United States) Greg Hancock	
2011	8	(Sweden) Andreas Jonsson	(United States) Greg Hancock	(Sweden) Antonio Lindbäck	
2012	9	(Sweden) Antonio Lindbäck	(Russia) Emil Sayfutdinov	(United States) Greg Hancock	
2013	10	(Denmark) Niels-Kristian Iversen	(United Kingdom) Tai Woffinden	(Russia) Emil Sayfutdinov	

== See also ==
- Sport in Italy
