= Martin Vaculík =

Slovak motorcycle speedway rider (born 1990)

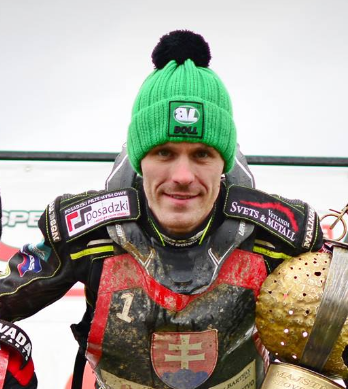
- Born: 5 April 1990 (age 36); Žarnovica, Slovakia
- Nationality: Slovakian

Career history

Poland
- 2006–2007: Krosno
- 2008: Rzeszów
- 2009: Gdańsk
- 2010–2015: Tarnów
- 2016: Toruń
- 2017–2018, 2021–2025: Gorzów
- 2019–2020: Zielona Góra
- 2026: Lublin

Sweden
- 2009: Smederna
- 2010–2013, 2017: Vetlanda
- 2014, 2026: Vargarna
- 2015–2016: Rospiggarna
- 2018: Västervik

Great Britain
- 2018: Leicester

Denmark
- 2008, 2011–2012, 2014: Holsted

Speedway Grand Prix statistics
- SGP number: 54
- Starts: 104
- Finalist: 21 times
- Winner: 9 times

Individual honours
- 2023: World Championship bronze
- 2013: European Champion

Martin Vaculík (born 5 April 1990) is a Slovak motorcycle speedway rider.

== Career ==
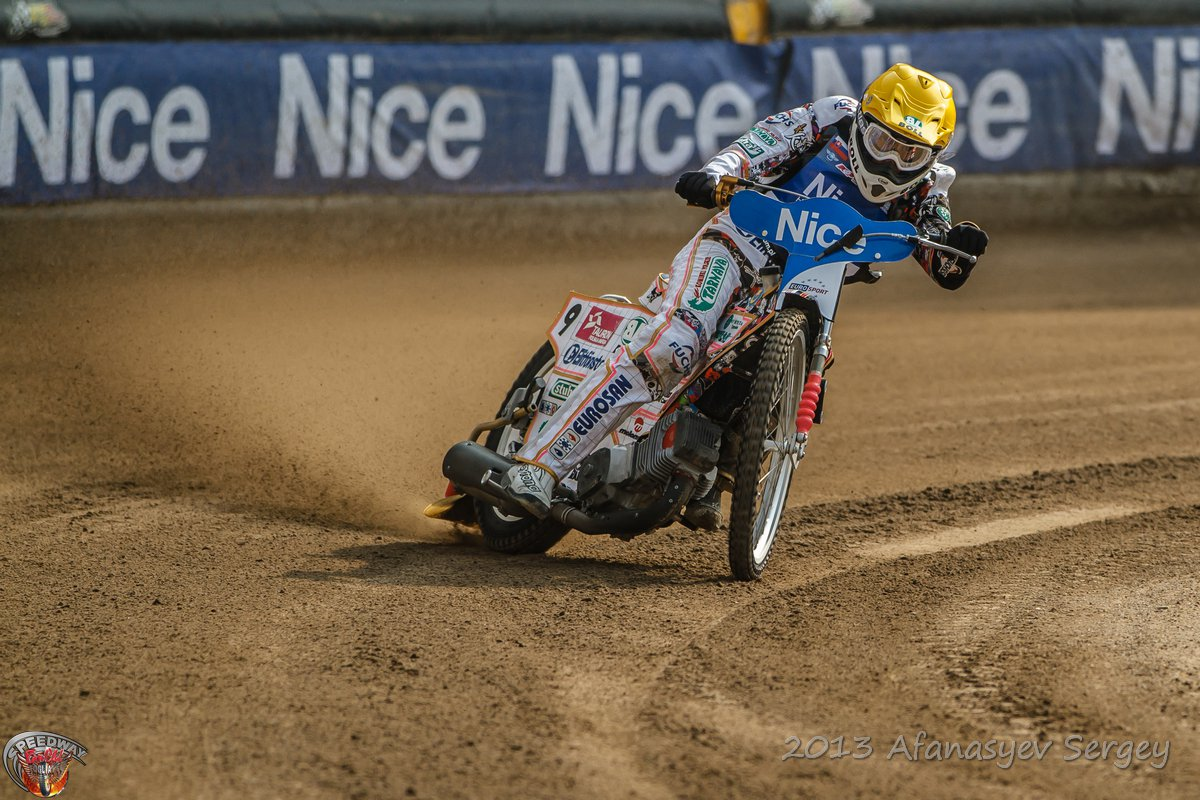
Vaculik in 2013

On the 6 May 2008, Vaculík gained a Polish speedway licence (Licencja "Ż") at Toruń, and from 4 June 2008, he has taken part in the Polish Championships as a Polish domestic rider.

In 2012, Vaculik won his first ever Grand Prix as part of the 2012 World Championship, he won the 2012 Speedway Grand Prix of Poland in Gorzów. The following year, he won the 2013 Speedway European Championship. After missing the World Championship from 2014 until 2016, he returned in 2017 and won the 2017 Speedway Grand Prix of Slovenia. He won his third Grand Prix during the 2018 Speedway Grand Prix series when winning the 2018 Speedway Grand Prix of Poland II.

Vaculík's only venture into British speedway (in 2018) ended in unfortunate circumstances after he broke an ankle riding for Leicester Lions in only his second outing with them.

In 2019, Vaculík rode strongly and finished in fifth place in the World Championship but suffered several injuries that affected his 2020 and 2021 performances.

Vaculík finished in ninth place (despite injury problems) during the 2022 Speedway World Championship, after securing 91 points during the 2022 Speedway Grand Prix, which included winning the Czech Republic and Toruń Grand Prix. He later broke his shoulder during a Polish league match.

Vaculík was selected as a full time rider for the 2023 Speedway Grand Prix and won the Czech Republic Grand Prix in June and Speedway Grand Prix of Great Britain in September. He went on to secure a career best finish in the World Championship by claiming the bronze medal.

During the 2024 Speedway Grand Prix, Vaculík secured a third consecutive Czech Republic Grand Prix and won the Polish Grand Prix in Wrocław. In 2025, he had a disappointing season, finishing 14th in the World Championship.

== Major results ==
=== World individual Championship ===
- 2012 Speedway Grand Prix – 11th
- 2013 Speedway Grand Prix – 14th
- 2017 Speedway Grand Prix – 9th
- 2018 Speedway Grand Prix – 13th
- 2019 Speedway Grand Prix – 5th
- 2020 Speedway Grand Prix – 9th
- 2021 Speedway Grand Prix – 12th
- 2022 Speedway Grand Prix – 9th
- 2023 Speedway Grand Prix – 3rd
- 2024 Speedway Grand Prix – 5th
- 2025 Speedway Grand Prix – 14th

=== Grand Prix wins ===
- 1: 2012 Speedway Grand Prix of Poland (Gorzów)
- 2: 2017 Speedway Grand Prix of Slovenia
- 3: 2018 Speedway Grand Prix of Poland II (Gorzów)
- 4: 2022 Speedway Grand Prix of Czech Republic
- 5: 2022 Speedway Grand Prix of Poland IV (Toruń)
- 6: 2023 Speedway Grand Prix of Czech Republic
- 7: 2023 Speedway Grand Prix of Great Britain
- 8: 2024 Speedway Grand Prix of Czech Republic
- 9: 2024 Speedway Grand Prix of Poland (Wrocław)

=== World junior Championships ===
- Individual U-21 World Championship
  - 2007 – 12th place in the Semi-final 2
  - 2008 – (Czech Republic) Pardubice – 5th place (9 pts)
  - 2009 – 16th place in the Semi-Final 1

=== European Championships ===
- Speedway European Championship
  - 2013 – European Champion
- Individual European Championship
  - 2008 – withdrew from the Qualifying Round 3
- Individual U-19 European Championship
  - 2007 – (Poland) Częstochowa – 6th place (10 pts + 4th in Rune-Off)
  - 2009 – (Poland) Tarnów – 3rd place (13 pts + 2nd in Run-Off)

== Speedway World Championships Results ==
| Year | 1 | 2 | 3 | 4 | 5 | 6 | 7 | 8 | 9 | 10 | 11 | 12 | Heats | Heat Wins | GP Finals | GP Wins | Position | Points |
|---|---|---|---|---|---|---|---|---|---|---|---|---|---|---|---|---|---|---|
| 2012 | NZL; DNS | EUR; DNS | CZE; DNS | SWE; DNS | DEN; DNS | POL; 20 | CRO; 8 | ITA; 14 | GBR; 7 | SCN; 6 | NOR; DNS | PL2; 12 | 35 | 12; 34.3% | 2 | 1 | 11th | 67 |
| 2013 | NZL; 5 | EUR; 4 | SWE; 3 | CZE; 6 | GBR; 11 | POL; 4 | DEN; 6 | ITA; 5 | LAT; 7 | SLO; 5 | SCA; 0 | PL2; 6 | 58 | 8; 13.8% | 0 | 0 | 14th | 62 |
| 2017 | SVN; 16 | POL; 10 | LAT; 8 | CZE; 10 | DEN; 1 | GBR; 4 | SWE; 10 | PL2; 7 | GER; 14 | SCA; 5 | PL3; 5 | AUS; 9 | 69 | 13; 18.8% | 3 | 1 | 9th | 99 |
| 2018 | POL; DNS | CZE; DNS | DEN; 3 | SWE; 1 | GBR; 3 | SCA; 10 | PL2; 18 | SVN; 9 | GER; 0 | PL3; 8 | | | 41 | 11; 26.8% | 2 | 1 | 13th | 52 |
| 2019 | POL; 7 | SVN; 17 | CZE; 4 | SWE; 16 | PL2; 15 | SCA; 9 | GER; 4 | DEN; 7 | GBR; 9 | PL3; 7 | | | 59 | 17; 28.8% | 3 | 0 | 5th | 95 |
| 2020 | POL; 9 | PL2; 3 | PL3; 12 | PL4; 11 | CZE; 16 | CZ2; 12 | PL5; 10 | PL6; 5 | | | | | 47 | 12; 25.5% | 1 | 0 | 9th | 78 |

== Speedway European Championship Results ==
| Year | 1 | 2 | 3 | 4 | Heats | Heat Wins | GP Finals | GP Wins | Position | Points |
|---|---|---|---|---|---|---|---|---|---|---|
| 2013 | POL; 9 | RUS; 10 | CRO; 10 | PL2; 18 | 22 | 14; 63.6% | 2 | 1 | 1st | 47 |
| 2014 | GER; 7 | RUS; 14 | DEN; 12 | POL; 8 | 22 | 7; 31.8% | 2 | 0 | 4th | 41 |
| 2015 | POL; 4 | GER; 11 | SWE; 8 | PL2; 9 | 20 | 4; 20.0% | 0 | 0 | 5th | 33 |
| 2016 | GER; 12 | LAT; 4 | RUS; 5 | POL; 0 | 17 | 3; 17.6% | 1 | 1 | 12th | 24 |

== See also ==
- Slovakia national speedway team
- Crystal Wing Awards
