= 2013 Speedway Grand Prix of Poland =

Speedway Grand Prix event

- Venue: Edward Jancarz Stadium; MotoArena Toruń
- Location: Gorzów; Toruń
- Start date: 15 June; 5 October
- Competitors: 16 (2 reserves)

The 2013 FIM Speedway Grand Prix of Poland was the sixth and twelfth rounds of the 2013 Speedway Grand Prix season (the World Championship).

The sixth round took place on 15 June at the Edward Jancarz Stadium in Gorzów Wielkopolski and the twelfth and final round was held on 5 October at the MotoArena Toruń in Toruń.

The rounds were the 23rd to 24th Speedway Grand Prix of Poland respectively.

Jarosław Hampel won the first event in Gorzów (his fourth career Grand Prix win) and Adrian Miedziński won the final round in Toruń (his first career Grand Prix win).

== Results ==
=== Event 1 - Gorzów Grand Prix (15 June) ===
Placing	Rider	1	2	3	4	5	6	7	8	9	10	11	12	13	14	15	16	17	18	19	20	Pts	SF1	SF2	Final	GP Pts
1	(Poland) (6) Jarosław Hampel		0				1			3							2			2		8		3	3	14
2	(Australia) (11) Chris Holder			0				3		2					2						3	10		2	2	14
3	(United Kingdom) (3) Tai Woffinden	0						2				0				3				3		8	3		1	12
4	(United States) (2) Greg Hancock	3					2				2				0				3			10	2		0	12
5	(Russia) (8) Emil Sayfutdinov		2						3			3			3			3				14	1			15
6	(Poland) (10) Krzysztof Kasprzak			3			0						3			1		2				9		1		10
7	(Denmark) (14) Niels Kristian Iversen				3		3					2		3							0	11		0		11
8	(Sweden) (4) Andreas Jonsson	1							1				2				3				2	9	0			9
9	(Denmark) (12) Nicki Pedersen			2					0		3			2						1		8				8
10	(Slovenia) (5) Matej Žagar		1			2					1					2					1	7				7
11	(Sweden) (16) Freddie Lindgren				2				2	1						0			2			7				7
12	(Poland) (13) Bartosz Zmarzlik				1	3							1		1					0		6				6
13	(Slovakia) (7) Martin Vaculík		3					1					0	0					0			4				4
14	(Poland) (9) Tomasz Gollob			1		1						1					e		1			4				4
15	(Sweden) (1) Antonio Lindbäck	2				0				0				1				0				3				3
16	(Czech Republic) (15) Aleš Dryml Jr.				0			0			0						1	1				2				2
R1	(Poland) (R1) Adrian Cyfer																					0	R1			
R2	(Poland) (R2) Lukasz Cyran																					0	R2			

m - exclusion for exceeding two minute time allowance • t - exclusion for touching the tapes • x - other exclusion • e - retired or mechanical failure • f - fell • ns - non-starter • nc - non-classify

gate A - inside	gate B	gate C	gate D - outside

=== Event 2 - Toruń Grand Prix (5 October) ===
Placing	Rider	1	2	3	4	5	6	7	8	9	10	11	12	13	14	15	16	17	18	19	20	Pts	SF1	SF2	Final	GP Pts
1	(Poland) (1) Adrian Miedziński	3				2				1				2				2				10		2	3	15
2	(United States) (6) Greg Hancock		3				3			3							3			1		13		3	2	18
3	(Poland) (13) Jarosław Hampel				3	1							3		3					3		13	3		1	17
4	(Denmark) (12) Niels Kristian Iversen			3					2		1			3						2		11	2		0	13
5	(Australia) (10) Darcy Ward			2			2						2			3		3				12		1		13
6	(United Kingdom) (9) Tai Woffinden			1		3						3					1		1			9	1			10
7	(Poland) (5) Krzysztof Kasprzak		1			0					3					2					3	9	0			9
8	(Denmark) (16) Nicki Pedersen				1				3	0						1			3			8		0		8
9	(Denmark) (2) Leon Madsen	2					1				2				2				0			7				7
10	(Slovakia) (11) Martin Vaculík			0				2		2					0						2	6				6
11	(Sweden) (15) Antonio Lindbäck				2			3			x						0	1				6				6
12	(Australia) (4) Troy Batchelor	1							1				1				2				1	6				6
13	(Sweden) (8) Andreas Jonsson		2						0			2			1			0				5				5
14	(Slovenia) (7) Matej Žagar		0					0					0	1					2			3				3
15	(Sweden) (3) Freddie Lindgren	0						1				1				0				0		2				2
16	(Czech Republic) (14) Aleš Dryml Jr.				0		0					0		0							0	0				0
R1	(Poland) (R1) Paweł Przedpełski																					0	R1			
R2	(Poland) (R2) Kamil Pulczynski																					0	R2			

m - exclusion for exceeding two minute time allowance • t - exclusion for touching the tapes • x - other exclusion • e - retired or mechanical failure • f - fell • ns - non-starter • nc - non-classify

gate A - inside	gate B	gate C	gate D - outside
