= 2013 Speedway Grand Prix of Europe =

Speedway Grand Prix event

- Venue: Polonia Bydgoszcz Stadium
- Location: Bydgoszcz (Poland)
- Start date: 20 April 2013
- Competitors: 16 (2 reserves)

The 2013 European FIM Speedway Grand Prix sponsored by Motorsportwash.com, was the second round of the 2013 Speedway Grand Prix season (the world championship). It took place on 20 April at the Polonia Bydgoszcz Stadium in Bydgoszcz, Poland.

The Speedway Grand Prix Commission nominated Krzysztof Buczkowski as wild card, and Szymon Woźniak and Mikołaj Curyło both as track reserves. The draw was made on 19 April.

It was the 13th Speedway Grand Prix of Europe.

The Grand Prix was by the Russian rider Emil Sayfutdinov (his fourth career Grand Prix win).

== Grand Prix result ==
| Placing | Rider | 1 | 2 | 3 | 4 | 5 | 6 | 7 | 8 | 9 | 10 | 11 | 12 | 13 | 14 | 15 | 16 | 17 | 18 | 19 | 20 | Pts | SF1 | SF2 | Final | GP Pts |
|---|---|---|---|---|---|---|---|---|---|---|---|---|---|---|---|---|---|---|---|---|---|---|---|---|---|---|
| 1 | (Russia) (10) Emil Sayfutdinov | | | 2 | | | 3 | | | | | | 1 | | | 2 | | 1 | | | | 9 | | 3 | 3 | 15 |
| 2 | (Slovenia) (15) Matej Žagar | | | | 3 | | | 1 | | | 2 | | | | | | 1 | 3 | | | | 10 | 2 | | 2 | 14 |
| 3 | (Poland) (7) Tomasz Gollob | | 3 | | | | | 0 | | | | | 3 | 3 | | | | | 3 | | | 12 | 3 | | 1 | 16 |
| 4 | (United Kingdom) (16) Tai Woffinden | | | | 2 | | | | 2 | 3 | | | | | | 3 | | | 2 | | | 12 | | 2 | 0 | 14 |
| 5 | (Australia) (11) Darcy Ward | | | 1 | | | | 3 | | 2 | | | | | 3 | | | | | | 3 | 12 | | 1 | | 13 |
| 6 | (Australia) (4) Chris Holder | 1 | | | | | | | 1 | | | | 2 | | | | 3 | | | | 2 | 9 | 1 | | | 10 |
| 7 | (Denmark) (8) Nicki Pedersen | | 1 | | | | | | 3 | | | 3 | | | 1 | | | 2 | | | | 10 | | 0 | | 10 |
| 8 | (Denmark) (13) Niels Kristian Iversen | | | | 1 | 3 | | | | | | | 0 | | 2 | | | | | 3 | | 9 | 0 | | | 9 |
| 9 | (United States) (3) Greg Hancock | 3 | | | | | | 2 | | | | 1 | | | | 1 | | | | 1 | | 8 | | | | 8 |
| 10 | (Poland) (9) Jarosław Hampel | | | 3 | | e | | | | | | 2 | | | | | 2 | | 1 | | | 8 | | | | 8 |
| 11 | (Poland) (5) Krzysztof Buczkowski | | 2 | | | 2 | | | | | 1 | | | | | 0 | | | | | 1 | 6 | | | | 6 |
| 12 | (Sweden) (1) Freddie Lindgren | 2 | | | | 1 | | | | 1 | | | | e | | | | 0 | | | | 4 | | | | 4 |
| 13 | (Slovakia) (2) Martin Vaculík | 0 | | | | | 1 | | | | 3 | | | | 0 | | | | 0 | | | 4 | | | | 4 |
| 14 | (Sweden) (12) Andreas Jonsson | | | 0 | | | | | 0 | | 0 | | | 2 | | | | | | 2 | | 4 | | | | 4 |
| 15 | (Sweden) (14) Antonio Lindbäck | | | | 0 | | 2 | | | | | 0 | | 1 | | | | | | | 0 | 3 | | | | 3 |
| 16 | (Poland) (6) Krzysztof Kasprzak | | 0 | | | | 0 | | | 0 | | | | | | | e | | | 0 | | 0 | | | | 0 |
| R1 | (Poland) (R1) Szymon Woźniak | | | | | | | | | | | | | | | | | | | | | 0 | R1 | | | |
| R2 | (Poland) (R2) Mikołaj Curyło | | | | | | | | | | | | | | | | | | | | | 0 | R2 | | | |

m - exclusion for exceeding two minute time allowance • t - exclusion for touching the tapes • x - other exclusion • e - retired or mechanical failure • f - fell • ns - non-starter • nc - non-classify

| gate A - inside | gate B | gate C | gate D - outside |
