= 2015 Speedway European Championship =

Motorcycle racing competition

Season details
- Dates: 20 June – 19 September
- Events: 4
- Cities: 4
- Countries: 3
- Riders: 15 permanents 1 wild card(s); 2 track reserves
- Heats: (in 4 events)

Winners
- Champion: RUS Emil Sayfutdinov
- Runner-up: DEN Nicki Pedersen
- 3rd place: SWE Antonio Lindbäck

The 2015 Speedway European Championship season was the third season of the Speedway European Championship (SEC) era, and the 15th UEM Individual Speedway European Championship. It was the third series under the promotion of One Sport Lts. of Poland.

The championship was won by Russia's Emil Sayfutdinov for the second season in succession. The Russian finished three points ahead of Danish rider Nicki Pedersen. Third place went to Antonio Lindbäck, who was another four points behind Pedersen. Janusz Kołodziej and Martin Vaculík secured the final two qualifying spots for the 2016 season by finishing fourth and fifth respectively.

== Qualification ==
For the 2015 season, 15 permanent riders were joined at each SEC Final by one wild card and two track reserves.

Defending champion, Emil Sayfutdinov from Russia was automatically invited to participate in all final events. Peter Kildemand, Nicki Pedersen, Martin Vaculík and Janusz Kołodziej secured their participation in all final events thanks to being in the top five of the general classification in the 2014 season.

Tomasz Gollob, Antonio Lindbäck and Martin Smolinski received and accepted a wild card to compete in the 2015 Speedway European Championships.

=== Qualified riders ===
#	Riders	2014 place	SEC Ch place	Appearance	Previous appearances in series
89	(Russia) Emil Sayfutdinov	1		3rd	2014
25	(Denmark) Peter Kildemand	2		2nd	2014
3	(Denmark) Nicki Pedersen	3		3rd	2014
54	(Slovakia) Martin Vaculík	4		3rd	2014
27	(Poland) Janusz Kołodziej	5		2nd	2014
20	(Poland) Tomasz Gollob	9		3rd	2014
84	(Germany) Martin Smolinski	16		2nd	2014
85	(Sweden) Antonio Lindbäck	–		1st	
222	(Russia) Artem Laguta	–	1	2nd	2013
34	(Denmark) Hans N. Andersen	–	2	2nd	2013
79	(Poland) Tomasz Jędrzejak	–	3	1st	
151	(Poland) Piotr Protasiewicz	–	4	1st	
13	(Czech Republic) Václav Milík	–	5	1st	
7	(Russia) Grigory Laguta	12	6	3rd	2014
59	(Poland) Przemysław Pawlicki	–	7	1st	

== Calendar ==
=== Qualification ===
The calendar for qualification consisted of 3 Semifinal events and one SEC Challenge event.

Round	Date	City and venue	Winner	Runner-up	3rd placed	4th placed	Results
Semifinal 1	1 May	Debrecen, Hungary Speedway Stadium	(Poland) Piotr Protasiewicz	(Poland) Tomasz Jędrzejak	(Denmark) Leon Madsen	(Czech Republic) Václav Milík	results
Semifinal 2	16 May	Daugavpils, Latvia Spīdveja Centrs	(Poland) Piotr Pawlicki Jr.	(Denmark) Hans N. Andersen	(Russia) Grigory Laguta	(Latvia) Andžejs Ļebedevs	results
Semifinal 3	16 May	(France) Lamothe-Landerron, [[]] Speedway Stadium	(Russia) Artem Laguta	(Denmark) Jesper B. Monberg	(Sweden) Linus Sundström	(Poland) Krzysztof Jabłoński	results
SEC Challenge	5 June	Toruń, Poland MotoArena	(Russia) Artem Laguta	(Denmark) Hans N. Andersen	(Poland) Tomasz Jędrzejak	(Poland) Piotr Protasiewicz	results

=== Championship Series ===
A four-event calendar was scheduled for the final series, with events in Poland, Germany and Sweden.

Round	Date	City and venue	Winner	Runner-up	3rd placed	4th placed	Results
1	20 June	Toruń, Poland MotoArena	(Denmark) Nicki Pedersen	(Poland) Paweł Przedpełski	(Russia) Emil Sayfutdinov	(Sweden) Antonio Lindbäck	results
2	11 July	Landshut, Germany Onesolar Arena	(Russia) Emil Sayfutdinov	(Denmark) Nicki Pedersen	(Sweden) Antonio Lindbäck	(Poland) Tomasz Gollob	results
3	15 August	Kumla, Sweden ICA Maxi Arena	(Russia) Emil Sayfutdinov	(Russia) Grigory Laguta	(Denmark) Nicki Pedersen	(Sweden) Antonio Lindbäck	results
4	19 September	Ostrów Wielkopolski, Poland Stadion Miejski	(Denmark) Nicki Pedersen	(Poland) Janusz Kołodziej	(Sweden) Antonio Lindbäck	(Poland) Przemysław Pawlicki	results

== Classification ==
Pos.	Rider	Points	(Poland)	(Germany)	(Sweden)	(Poland)
1	(Russia) (89) Emil Sayfutdinov	58	16	15	18	9
2	(Denmark) (3) Nicki Pedersen	55	15	14	11	15
3	(Sweden) (85) Antonio Lindbäck	51	12	11	12	16
4	(Poland) (27) Janusz Kołodziej	33	4	10	7	12
5	(Slovakia) (54) Martin Vaculík	33	5	11	8	9
6	(Russia) (7) Grigory Laguta	30	9	5	10	6
7	(Poland) (59) Przemysław Pawlicki	28	5	8	5	10
8	(Russia) (222) Artem Laguta	28	8	5	8	7
9	(Denmark) (34) Hans N. Andersen	25	2	9	6	8
10	(Denmark) (25) Peter Kildemand	22	10	5	–	7
11	(Poland) (151) Piotr Protasiewicz	20	8	7	–	5
12	(Czech Republic) (13) Václav Milík	20	7	6	5	2
13	(Poland) (20) Tomasz Gollob	18	6	12	0	–
14	(Germany) (84) Martin Smolinski	17	1	5	9	2
15	(Poland) (79) Tomasz Jędrzejak	16	6	1	7	2
16	(Poland) (16) Paweł Przedpełski	12	12	–	–	–
17	(Sweden) (16) Fredrik Lindgren	9	–	–	9	–
18	(Poland) (16) Mateusz Szczepaniak	9	–	–	–	9
19	(Poland) (15) Piotr Pawlicki Jr.	7	–	–	–	7
20	(Sweden) (17) Fredrik Engman	6	–	–	6	–
21	(Sweden) (16) Joel Andersson	4	–	–	4	–
22	(Germany) (16) Michael Hartel	1	–	1	–	–
23	(Germany) (17) Kai Huckenbeck	1	–	1	–	–
24	(Russia) (15) Vitaly Belousov	1	–	–	1	–
25	(Germany) (18) Tobias Busch	0	–	0	–	–
26	(Poland) (17) Rune Holta	0	–	–	–	0

2015 Speedway European Champion
(Russia)
Emil Sayfutdinov
Second title

== See also ==
- 2015 Speedway Grand Prix
