= 2013 Speedway Grand Prix of Sweden =

Speedway Grand Prix event

- Venue: Ullevi
- Location: Gothenburg
- Start date: 4 May
- Competitors: 16 (2 reserves)

The 2013 FIM Speedway Grand Prix of Sweden was the third round of the 2013 Speedway Grand Prix season (the World Championship).

The event took place on 4 May at the Ullevi in Gothenburg, Sweden.

The round was the 19th Speedway Grand Prix of Sweden.

The Grand Prix was won by the Russian rider Emil Sayfutdinov (which was his fifth career Grand Prix win).

== Grand Prix result ==
Placing	Rider	1	2	3	4	5	6	7	8	9	10	11	12	13	14	15	16	17	18	19	20	Pts	SF1	SF2	Final	GP Pts
1	(Russia) (4) Emil Sayfutdinov	1							2				3				3				2	11		3	3	17
2	(Australia) (10) Chris Holder			3			3						2			0		2				10	2		2	14
3	(Denmark) (16) Nicki Pedersen				2				3	2						1			1			9		2	1	12
4	(Poland) (2) Jarosław Hampel	2					2				2				3				3			12	3		0	15
5	(United Kingdom) (11) Tai Woffinden			2				3		3					2						1	11		1		12
6	(Denmark) (8) Niels Kristian Iversen		2						1			3			0			3				9	1			10
7	(Poland) (3) Tomasz Gollob	3						1				0				2				3		9	0			9
8	(Slovenia) (5) Matej Žagar		3			0					0					3					3	9		0		9
9	(United States) (12) Greg Hancock			0					0		3			3						2		8				8
10	(Sweden) (13) Antonio Lindbäck				3	3							0		1					1		8				8
11	(Poland) (7) Krzysztof Kasprzak		1					2					1	1					2			7				7
12	(Sweden) (9) Linus Sundström			1		2						1					2		0			6				6
13	(Sweden) (1) Freddie Lindgren	0				1				1				2				1				5				5
14	(Sweden) (14) Andreas Jonsson				0		1					2		0							0	3				3
15	(Slovakia) (15) Martin Vaculík				1			0			1						1	0				3				3
16	(Australia) (6) Darcy Ward		0				f			ns							ns			ns		0				0
R1	(Sweden) (R1) Dennis Andersson									0										0		0	R1			
R2	(Sweden) (R2) Mathias Thörnblom																0					0	R2			

m - exclusion for exceeding two minute time allowance • t - exclusion for touching the tapes • x - other exclusion • e - retired or mechanical failure • f - fell • ns - non-starter • nc - non-classify

gate A - inside	gate B	gate C	gate D - outside
