= 2013 Speedway Grand Prix of Scandinavia =

Speedway Grand Prix event

- Venue: Friends Arena
- Location: Stockholm, (Sweden)
- Start date: 21 September 2013
- Competitors: 16 (2 reserves)

The 2013 Speedway Grand Prix of Scandinavia was the 11th round of the 2013 Speedway Grand Prix season (the world championship). It took place on 27 September at the Friends Arena in Stockholm, (Sweden).

It was the 12th time that the Speedway Grand Prix of Scandinavia had been held.

The Grand Prix was by the Danish rider Niels Kristian Iversen (his second career Grand Prix win).

== Grand Prix result ==
Placing	Rider	1	2	3	4	5	6	7	8	9	10	11	12	13	14	15	16	17	18	19	20	Pts	SF1	SF2	Final	GP Pts
1	(Denmark) (16) Niels Kristian Iversen				t				3	3						3			3			12		3	3	18
2	(Slovenia) (7) Matej Žagar		3					3					3	2					0			11	2		2	15
3	(Poland) (13) Jarosław Hampel				2	0							2		2					3		9	3		1	13
4	(United States) (1) Greg Hancock	3				3				0				3				1				10		2	0	13
5	(Australia) (15) Darcy Ward				3			2			3						3	3				14	1			15
6	(Denmark) (11) Leon Madsen			3				1		1					0						3	8		1		9
7	(Sweden) (6) Andreas Jonsson		2				3			2							1			2		10	0			10
8	(Poland) (9) Krzysztof Kasprzak			1		2						3					2		2			10		0		10
9	(Sweden) (2) Freddie Lindgren	2					2				2				1				1			8				8
10	(United Kingdom) (8) Tai Woffinden		x						2			2			3			e				7				7
11	(Denmark) (10) Nicki Pedersen			2			t						1			1		1				5				5
12	(Sweden) (3) Antonio Lindbäck	1						0				1				0				1		3				4
13	(Czech Republic) (12) Aleš Dryml Jr.			0					1		1			1						0		3				3
14	(Sweden) (14) Kim Nilsson				0		0					0		0							2	2				2
15	(Slovakia) (4) Martin Vaculík	0							f				ns				ns				ns	0				0
16	(Poland) (5) Tomasz Gollob		ns			ns					ns					ns					ns	0				0
R1	(Sweden) (R1) Fredrik Engman		1			1					0					2					0	4	R1			
R2	(Sweden) (R2) Oliver Berntzon				1		1						0				0				1	3	R2			

m - exclusion for exceeding two minute time allowance • t - exclusion for touching the tapes • x - other exclusion • e - retired or mechanical failure • f - fell • ns - non-starter • nc - non-classify

gate A - inside	gate B	gate C	gate D - outside
