= 2013 Speedway Grand Prix of Great Britain =

(United Kingdom) 2013 Speedway Grand Prix of Great Britain
- 2013 FIM Fogo British SGP

Information
- Date: 1 June 2013
- City: (United Kingdom) (Wales) Cardiff
- Event: 5 of 12 (161)
- Referee: (Sweden) Krister Gardell

Stadium details
- Stadium: Millennium Stadium
- Capacity: 62,500
- Length: 277 m (303 yd)
- Track: temporary (rugby, football/soccer)

SGP Results
- Best Time
- (gold) Winner: (Russia) Emil Sayfutdinov
- (silver) Runner-up: (Denmark) Niels Kristian Iversen
- (bronze) 3rd place: (Poland) Krzysztof Kasprzak

The 2013 Speedway Grand Prix of Great Britain, also known as the 2013 FIM Fogo British Speedway Grand Prix for sponsorship reasons, was the fifth race of the 2013 Speedway Grand Prix season. It took place on 1 June at the Millennium Stadium in Cardiff, Wales, United Kingdom. The Grand Prix was won by Emil Sayfutdinov who beat Niels Kristian Iversen, Krzysztof Kasprzak and Fredrik Lindgren in the final.

== Riders ==
The Speedway Grand Prix Commission nominated Chris Harris as Wild Card, and Craig Cook and Josh Auty both as Track Reserves.

== See also ==
- motorcycle speedway
