= Pista Olimpia Terenzano =

Stadium in Terenzano, Italy

- Location: Via Giacomo Leopardi, 2, 33050 Pozzuolo del Friuli, Udine, Italy
- Coordinates: 46°00′04″N 13°13′38″E
- Capacity: 4,000
- Owner: Moto Club Olimpia
- Opened: 1971
- Length: 0.400 km

The Pista Olimpia Terenzano is a 4,000-capacity motorcycle stadium in the Terenzano Province of Udine. The stadium is situated south of Udine and north east of Pozzuolo del Friuli. The speedway track has a circumference of 400 metres.

== History ==
The stadium has been the home of the World Championship round known as the Speedway Grand Prix of Italy from 2009 to 2013.

The stadium hosts the Italian Individual Speedway Championship, the Italian team championship, the Italian Pairs Championship and the world speedway event qualifications.

== Motoclub Olimpia ==
The speedway team Motoclub Olimpia were formed in 1971 and race at the stadium. They competed in the European Speedway Club Champions' Cup in 1998.

== See also ==
- Speedway Grand Prix of Italy
