= Speedway Grand Prix =

Series of motorcycling contests

FIM Speedway Grand Prix
- Current season, competition or edition: 2026 Speedway Grand Prix
- Sport: Speedway
- Founded: 1995
- Motto: No brakes, no gear, no fear
- No. of teams: 15 riders + 1 wild card
- Country: Worldwide
- Most recent champion: (United Kingdom) Robert Lambert
- Website: fimspeedway.com

Speedway Grand Prix are a series of stand-alone motorcycle speedway events over the course of a season used to determine the Speedway World Champion. The series started in 1995 replacing the previous format of a single event final. The first winner was Hans Nielsen of Denmark.

== Event format ==
The format for a Grand Prix changed for the 2007 season onwards. Sixteen riders take part in each Grand Prix and over the course of twenty heats each rider will race against every other rider once. The top eight scorers advance to a semi-final and from each semi-final the 1st and 2nd placed riders will advance to the GP final.

In this format all rides counted towards Grand Prix points totals, including the semi-final and final, the maximum points for a single GP is 21 (5x heat wins, semi final win and final win). This scoring revision was introduced as a result of comments made during 2006 that the 4 finalists received too many points compared to the losing semi-finalists who in turn received little benefit compared to, say, the 9th placed non-qualifier. Also, this format means that the winner of each Grand Prix may not have been the rider who scores most GP points from each round. The scoring system has been overhauled for the 2020 season which will see championship points scored based on the overall GP result of a rider rather than each individual heat of which those points will only decide the progress of a rider in a GP.

== Qualification for Grand Prix ==
The same 15 riders form the basis of the Grand Prix line up throughout the course of the season, barring injuries. The 16th rider, known as the "wild card", will normally be a leading non-GP rider from the country in which the Grand Prix is being held. The Wild Card can win the Grand Prix like any other rider, and their World Championship points count the same as the 15 permanent riders, although this has only happened on six occasions by Mark Loram, Martin Dugard, Hans Andersen at the 2006 Danish Grand Prix, Michael Jepsen Jensen at the 2012 Speedway Grand Prix of Nordic, Adrian Miedziński at the 2013 Speedway Grand Prix of Poland and most recently Bartosz Zmarzlik at the 2014 Speedway Grand Prix of Poland.

The 15 permanent Grand Prix riders have been decided by various methods over the history of the series. For the 2016 season, the top 8 riders from the 2015 World Championship automatically qualified. They were joined by 3 riders who qualified via the Grand Prix Qualifiers, and 4 riders who were nominated by then-series promoters, IMG.

== Event promotion ==
The Speedway Grand Prix series and the Speedway World Cup were originally promoted by Benfield Sports International, which later was renamed to BSI Speedway. On 11 April 2007 it was announced that BSI Speedway had been acquired by IMG and the existing team took up roles within IMG Motorsport. IMG Motorsport managed the series until 2021.

Speedway Grand Prix is currently promoted by Discovery Sports Events, formerly Eurosport Events since 2022.

== See also ==
- List of world cups and world championships
