= Emil Sayfutdinov =

Russian motorcycle speedway rider

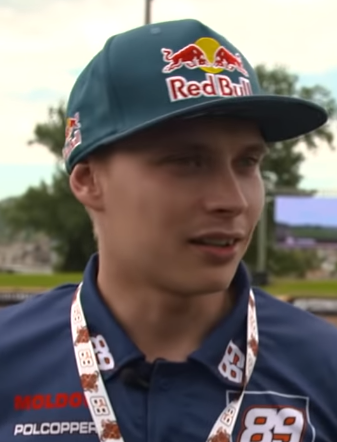
- Sayfutdinov in 2019
- Born: 26 October 1989 (age 37); Salavat, Russian SFSR, Soviet Union
- Nationality: Russian/Polish (dual)
- Website: EmilRacing.com

Career history

Russia
- 2005, 2007–2008: Togliatti
- 2009–2012, 2018–2020: Balakovo
- 2013–2014: Salavat

Poland
- 2006–2012: Bydgoszcz
- 2013: Częstochowa
- 2014, 2022–2026: Toruń
- 2015–2021: Leszno

Sweden
- 2007–2008: Masarna
- 2009–2010, 2017: Piraterna
- 2013: Indianerna
- 2012, 2014–2016: Vetlanda

Denmark
- 2009–2010: Vojens
- 2026: Esbjerg

Great Britain
- 2011: Coventry
- 2023–2025: Ipswich

Speedway Grand Prix statistics
- SGP number: 89
- Starts: 79
- Podiums: 18 (7-4-7)
- Finalist: 22 times
- Winner: 7 times

Individual honours
- 2009, 2019, 2021: World Individual Championship bronze medal
- 2007, 2008: World Under-21 Champion
- 2005, 2008: U-21 Russian Champion
- 2014, 2015: European Champion
- 2014: Ekstraliga Riders’ Champion
- 2016: Golden Helmet of Pardubice

Team honours
- 2018, 2019, 2020: World team champion
- 2008: European Club Champion
- 2005, 2009: Russian Pairs Champion
- 2005, 2007, 2008, 2009: Team Russian Champion
- 2012, 2014, 2015: Elitserien League Champion
- 2025, 2026: Polish champion
- 2023: Knockout Cup (UK)
- 2025: League champion (UK)

Emil Damirovich Sayfutdinov (Russian: Эмиль Дамирович Сайфутдинов; born 26 October 1989) is a motorcycle speedway rider from Russia. He is a member of the Russia national speedway team. He is a three-time World team champion, twice World Junior champion and a two-time winner of the European Championships in 2014 and 2015.

== Career history ==
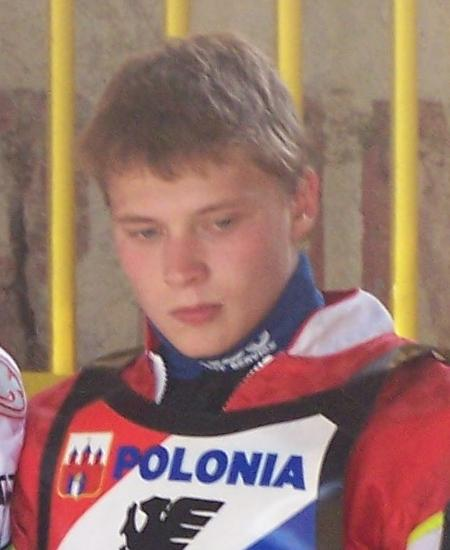
Sayfutdinov before an Ekstraliga match (30 July 2006)

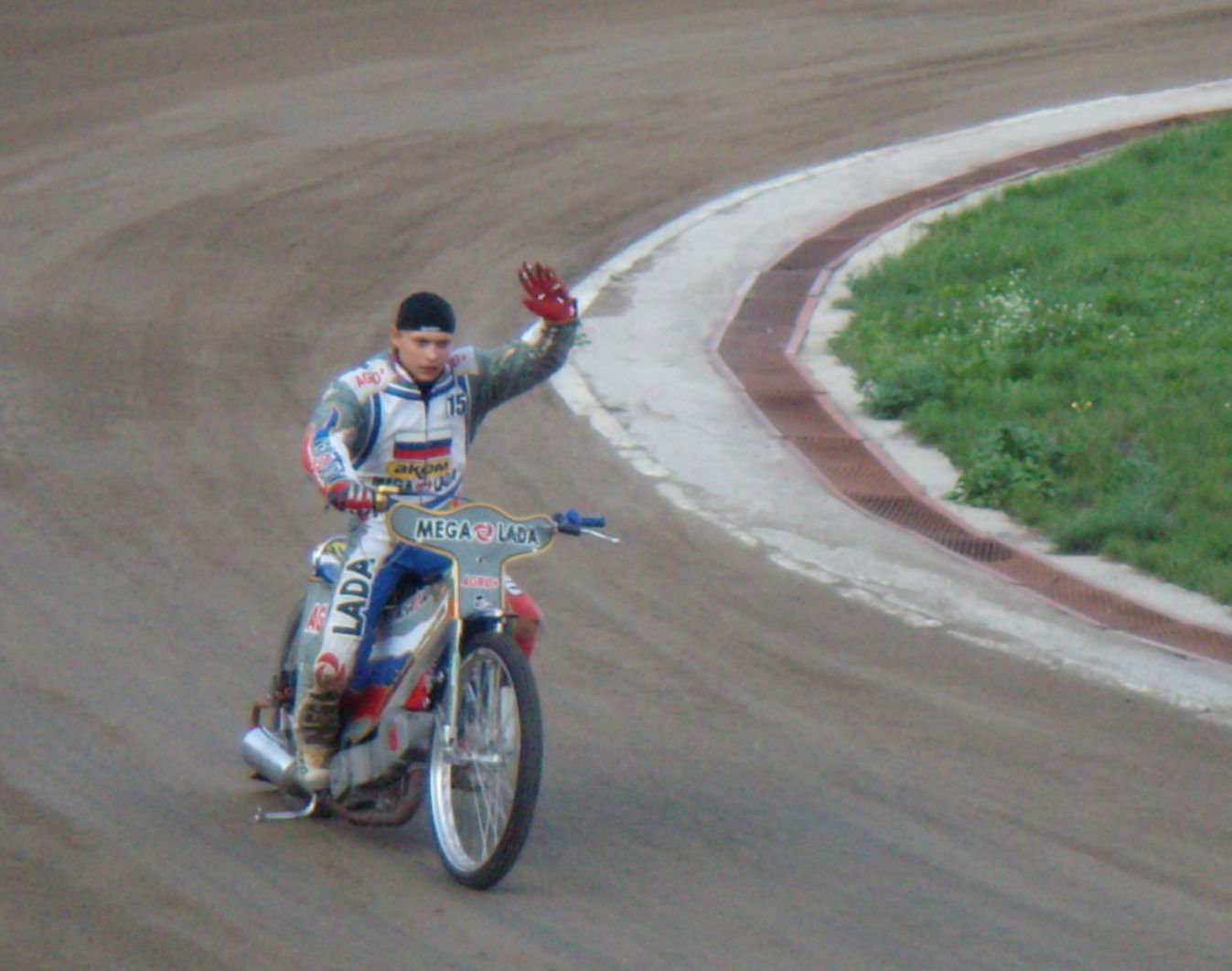
Sayfutdinov in Russian league, September 2007

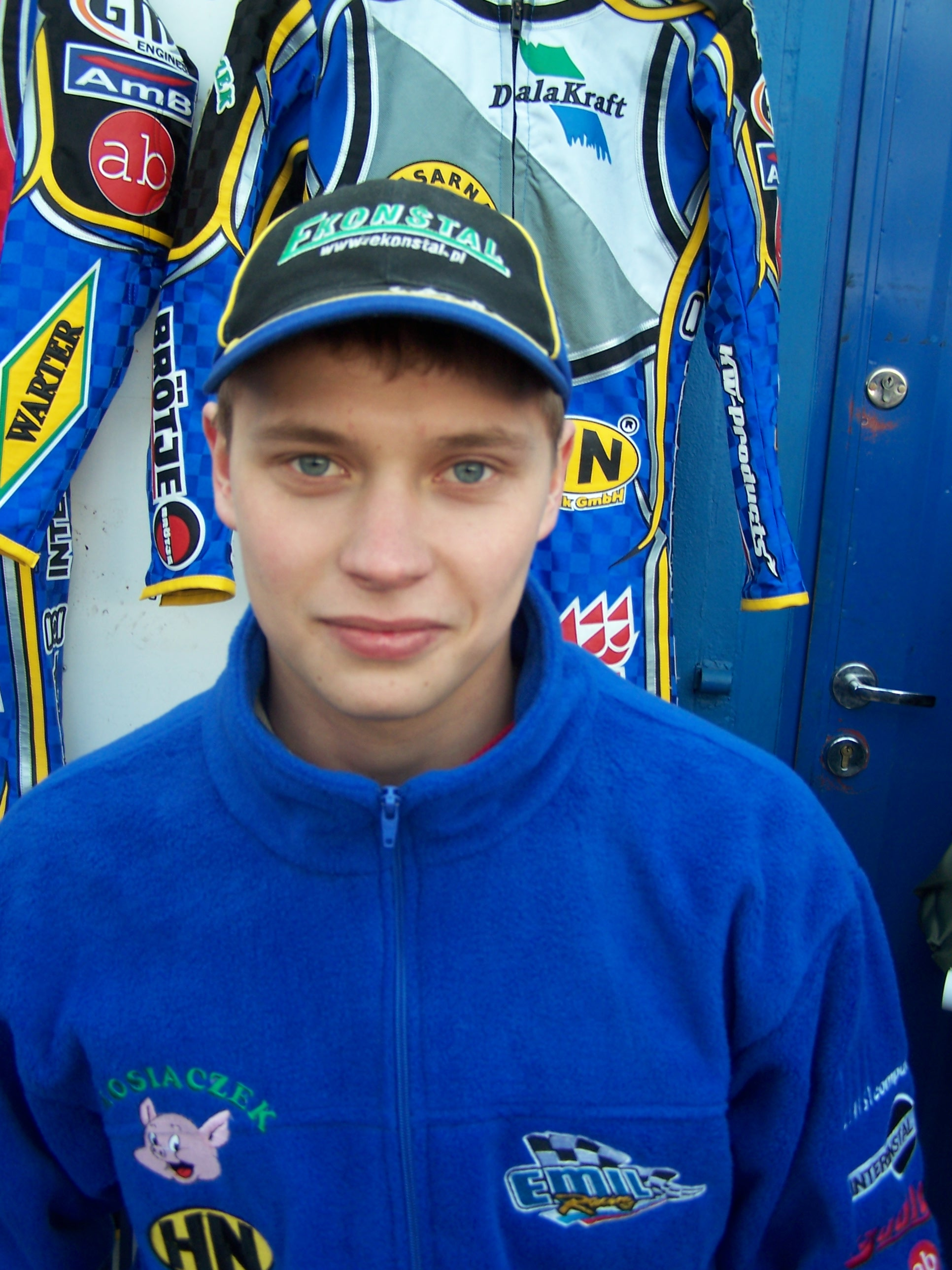
Saifutdinov in 2008

Sayfutdinov gained his speedway licence in 2005, just before his 16th birthday. He started his career in the Russian league with Mega-Lada Togliatti and won the Russian Champion title. He averaged 2.271 (15th place in league), won the Russian Pairs Championship and won the Individual under-21 Russian Championship and was sixth in the Russian Senior Championship. In international competitions, he started in the Individual U-19 European Championship and won qualification to the final but was too young to take part.

In 2006, Sayfutdinov signed for Polish team Polonia Bydgoszcz and rode his first meeting in the Polish Ekstraliga, on 9 April 2006. Polonia Bydgoszcz finished third in Polish Championship - Emil's average was 1.353 (38th place). In 2007, Sayfutdinov remained with Polonia Bydgoszcz, where he averaged 1.463 (36th place). He also made his debut in the Swedish Elitserien with Masarna who finished in fifth place in league. The following season (2007), he returned to Russian league with Mega-Lada Togliatti and won the league championship. In June 2007, Sayfutdinov took part in the Team U-21 World Championship and he also made his senior debut for Russia at the 2007 Speedway World Cup, finishing in sixth place. After winning the quarter and semi-finals, he qualified to the Individual U-21 World Championship Final. In September, he finished the year on a high, becoming the World Under-21 Champion for the first time with a 15-point maximum score, breaking the track record twice during the meeting.

In 2008, Sayfutdinov remained with Polonia Bydgoszcz in the 2008 Polish speedway season winning the 1.Liga with the club. He also rode in Sweden for Masarna again and in Russia for Mega-Lada Togliatti, winning the league championship title again. Sayfutdinov won Individual U-21 Russian Champion title and won the silver medal in the Russian Senior Championship. In July 2008, he participated in the 2008 Speedway World Cup. In the semi-final, he was the top point scorer for Russia with 14 points. Sayfutdinov did not take part in the race-off because he was taking part in the Individual U-21 World Championship semi-final, where he won qualification to the final. On 4 October 2008, he defended his World Under-21 Champion title, becoming the first rider to ever do so.

In 2009. Sayfutdinov was given a permanent wild card to the 2009 Speedway Grand Prix by the SGP Commission. His first season in the Speedway Grand Prix (SGP) as a 19 year old, was the youngest permanent rider in SGP history. He made his debut on 25 April at the Czech Grand Prix in Prague. Sayfutdinov qualified for the final which he won, making him the youngest ever rider to win a Grand Prix. At the British GP in Cardiff, during heat 5, Sayfutdinov had a fight on the track with Scott Nicholls. The final round of 2009 season was on his home track in Bydgoszcz. He ended the World Championship with the bronze medal, winning 3 Grand Prix in his first season at the sport's premier competition. Domestically he rode for Polonia Bydgoszcz, Piraterna, Vojens and Turbina Balakovo. Sayfutdinov with Denis Gizatullin and Andrey Kudryashov was won Pairs Russia Cup for Turbina Balakovo.

Sayfutdinov started the 2010 season with a third place in the Polish Grand Prix in Leszno but in the Czech Grand Prix, he was involved in a serious crash and broke his arm. After injury, he returned in the Swedish Grand Prix in Malilla but crashed and broke his arm once again, which ended his season. The following year in 2011, he started out with a third place, just like the previous year, in the first Grand Prix in Leszno. That was his only time on the podium until the last round in Gorzow, where he made another third place. He was sixth overall in the Grand Prix series, which was enough to be one of the eight best and automatically qualify for the 2012 Grand Prix. Sayfutdinov was nominated to Russia team to Team U-21 World Championship Qualifying Round 2, but Russia was withdrew.

In 2014, an injury and financial costs forced Sayfutdinov to withdraw from Speedway Grand Prix series. He did however ride in the Individual Speedway European Championship, where he won the gold medal. He repeated the European success the following season in 2015, before returning to the World Championship (Grand Prix series in 2017. In 2018, Sayfutdinov finished eighth in the 2018 World Championship but won a gold medal with Russia in the 2018 Speedway of Nations (the World Team Championship).

In 2019, Sayfutdinov finished third and won his second bronze medal in the 2019 World Championship, finishing with 126 points. The bronze came ten years after his first. He also won his second gold medal with Russia in the 2019 Speedway of Nations (the World Team Championship). Sayfutdinov was now regarded as one of the world's leading riders but had a disappointing 2020 World Championship, finishing eighth but he did win his third consecutive gold medal with Russia in the 2020 Speedway of Nations (the World Team Championship).

In 2021, Sayfutdinov had a better World Championship, winning his third bronze medal in the 2021 World Championship, finishing with 140 points. However, Sayfutdinov was unable to compete for the world title in 2022, following the Fédération Internationale de Motocyclisme ban on Russian and Belarusian motorcycle riders, teams, officials, and competitions as a result of the 2022 Russian invasion of Ukraine.

In 2023, Sayfutdinov joined the Ipswich Witches for the SGB Premiership 2023 and won the Knockout Cup with them. He was able to ride for Ipswich by virtue of having a Polish licence and dual citizenship and therefore overcoming the ban on Russian riders. Despite the dual citizenship, he was not awarded a place for the 2024 Speedway Grand Prix but did re-sign for Ipswich for 2024.

In 2025, Sayfutdinov helped Ipswich win the SGB Premiership 2025.

== Personal life ==
Sayfutdinov's parents are Tatar father Damir and Russian mother Tamara; his brother, Denis (born 2 June 1981) is also a speedway rider. Denis was a member of the Russian team during the 2002 Speedway World Cup and 2004 Speedway World Cup Qualification.

In March 2009, Sayfutdinov gained Polish citizenship. Before the 2010 season, his Polish club Polonia Bydgoszcz applied to Main Commission of Speedway Sport (GKSŻ) for him to be exempt from the Polish speedway licence (Licencja "Ż") exam based on his individual honours (including bronze medal in the 2009 Speedway Grand Prix and two Individual Speedway Junior World Championship titles). GKSŻ excepted him, and on 22 April 2010, confirmed Sayfutdinov as domestic rider and known as Emil Sajfutdinow. In the Speedway Ekstraliga minimum three riders must have Polish licency. In international competitions, he will continue to represent Russia.

Sayfutdinov currently lives at the Zielona Tarasy (Green Terrace) residential estate in Bydgoszcz, Poland.

== Major results ==
=== World individual Championship ===
- 2009 Speedway Grand Prix – 3rd (139 pts)
- 2010 Speedway Grand Prix – 15th (33 pts)
- 2011 Speedway Grand Prix – 6th (106 pts)
- 2012 Speedway Grand Prix – 5th (133 pts)
- 2013 Speedway Grand Prix – 6th (114 pts)
- 2017 Speedway Grand Prix – 6th (117 pts)
- 2018 Speedway Grand Prix – 8th (89 pts)
- 2019 Speedway Grand Prix – 3rd (126 pts)
- 2020 Speedway Grand Prix – 8th (81 pts)
- 2021 Speedway Grand Prix – 3rd (149 pts)

=== Grand Prix wins ===
- 1: 2009 Speedway Grand Prix of Czech Republic
- 2: 2009 Speedway Grand Prix of Sweden
- 3: 2009 Speedway Grand Prix of Slovenia
- 4: 2013 Speedway Grand Prix of Europe (Bydgoszcz)
- 5: 2013 Speedway Grand Prix of Sweden
- 6: 2013 Speedway Grand Prix of Great Britain
- 7: 2019 Speedway Grand Prix of Sweden

=== World team championships ===
- 2007 Speedway World Cup – 6th
- 2008 Speedway World Cup – 6th
- 2009 Speedway World Cup – 4th
- 2011 Speedway World Cup – 5th
- 2012 Speedway World Cup – 3rd
- 2016 Speedway World Cup – 6th
- 2017 Speedway World Cup – 3rd
- 2018 Speedway of Nations – Champion
- 2019 Speedway of Nations – Champion
- 2020 Speedway of Nations – Champion

=== World junior championships ===
- Individual U-21 World Championship (Under-21 World Championship)
  - 2007 – POL Ostrów Wlkp. - World Champion (15 points)
  - 2008 – CZE Pardubice - World Champion (14 points)
- Team U-21 World Championship (U-21 Speedway World Cup)
  - 2007 – 4th place in Qualifying Round 2
  - 2008 – 4th place in Qualifying Round 1

=== European Championships ===
- European Club Champions' Cup
  - 2008 - (Czech Republic) Slaný – Winner (13 points)

=== Domestic competitions ===
- Individual Speedway Russian Junior Championship
  - 2005 – Winner
  - 2007 – Silver medal
  - 2008 – Winner
- Russian Pairs Speedway Championship
  - 2005 – Winner
  - 2007 – Bronze medal
  - 2009 – Winner
- Team Polish Championship
  - 2006 – 3rd with Bydgoszcz
  - 2007 – 8th place with Bydgoszcz
  - 2008 – First League winner with Bydgoszcz
- Russian League Championship
  - 2005 – Winner
  - 2007 – Winner
  - 2008 – Winner
  - 2009 – Winner

== See also ==
- Russia national speedway team
- List of Speedway Grand Prix riders
