= Krzysztof Kasprzak =

Polish speedway rider

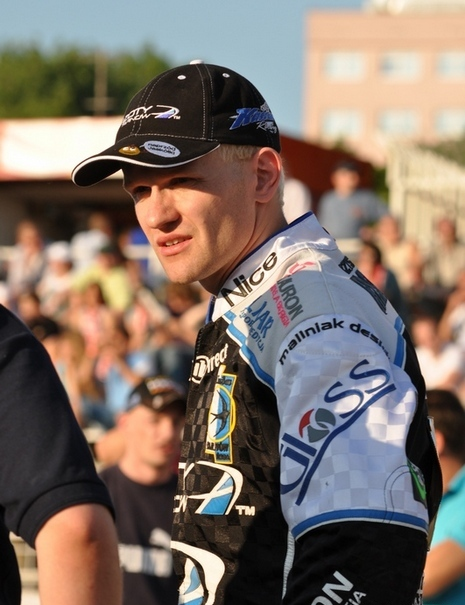
- Born: 18 July 1984 (age 42); Leszno, Poland
- Nationality: Polish
- Website: www.speedwayportal.com/kk507

Career history

Poland
- 2000–2009: Leszno
- 2010–2011: Tarnów
- 2012–2020: Gorzów
- 2021–2022: Grudziądz
- 2023: Krosno
- 2024: Gdańsk

Great Britain
- 2003–2005, 2008, 2012, 2017: Poole Pirates
- 2007, 2010: Lakeside Hammers
- 2009: Belle Vue Aces
- 2010, 2013, 2016: Coventry Bees
- 2011: Birmingham Brummies
- 2017–2018: Rye House Rockets
- 2023: King's Lynn Stars

Sweden
- 2003–2009: Smederna
- 2009–2011: Vargarna
- 2012: Valsarna
- 2014: Västervik
- 2015, 2021: Lejonen
- 2016: Masarna
- 2018: Dackarna
- 2022: Indianerna

Speedway Grand Prix statistics
- Starts: 55
- Podiums: 11 (3-3-5)
- Finalist: 12 times
- Winner: 3 times

Individual honours
- 2014: World Championship silver medal
- 2014: Polish Champion
- 2005: World Under-21 Champion
- 2003: European Champion
- 2019: Polish Golden Helmet
- 2002: Polish Silver Helmet
- 2012: GP Challenge winner

Team honours
- 2007, 2009, 2011, 2013, 2016: World team Champion
- 2005: European Pairs Champion
- 2005: Under-21 World Cup
- 2003, 2004, 2010: Elite League Champion
- 2004: Elite League KO Cup Winner
- 2003: Polish Pairs Champion
- 2005: Polish Under-21 Pairs Champion
- 2007, 2014, 2016: Speedway Ekstraliga

Krzysztof Kasprzak ([ˈkʐɨʂtɔf ˈkaspʐak]; born 18 July 1984 in Leszno, Poland) is a Polish international motorcycle speedway rider, who became World Under-21 Champion in 2005 and won the silver medal during the 2014 Speedway Grand Prix. He also won five World team titles and He earned 13 international caps for the Poland national speedway team.

== Career ==
Kasprzak became the European Champion in 2003 after winning the 2003 Individual Speedway European Championship. He also made his British speedway debut after joining Poole Pirates and won the Polish pairs championship. The following year in 2004, he broke into the Poland team, representing them in the 2004 Speedway World Cup and finished runenr-up in the Polish U21 championships.

In 2005, Kasprzak won European Pairs Championship and Under-21 World Cup for Poland. He also won the 2005 Speedway Under-21 World Championship after the meeting was stopped early after just 12 heats due to heavy rain and dangerous track conditions. Kasprzak and Tomáš Suchánek both finished on 8 points after three rides and Kasprzak was declared the winner after coin flipping.

Kasprzak had been a wild card rider in four Speedway Grand Prix, in 2004 and 2007 at Bydgoszcz and in 2005 and 2006 at Wrocław and then became a permanent rider for the 2008 series after being awarded a wild card place. His second place in the 2007 Polish Grand Prix was one of the reasons he was given the chance.

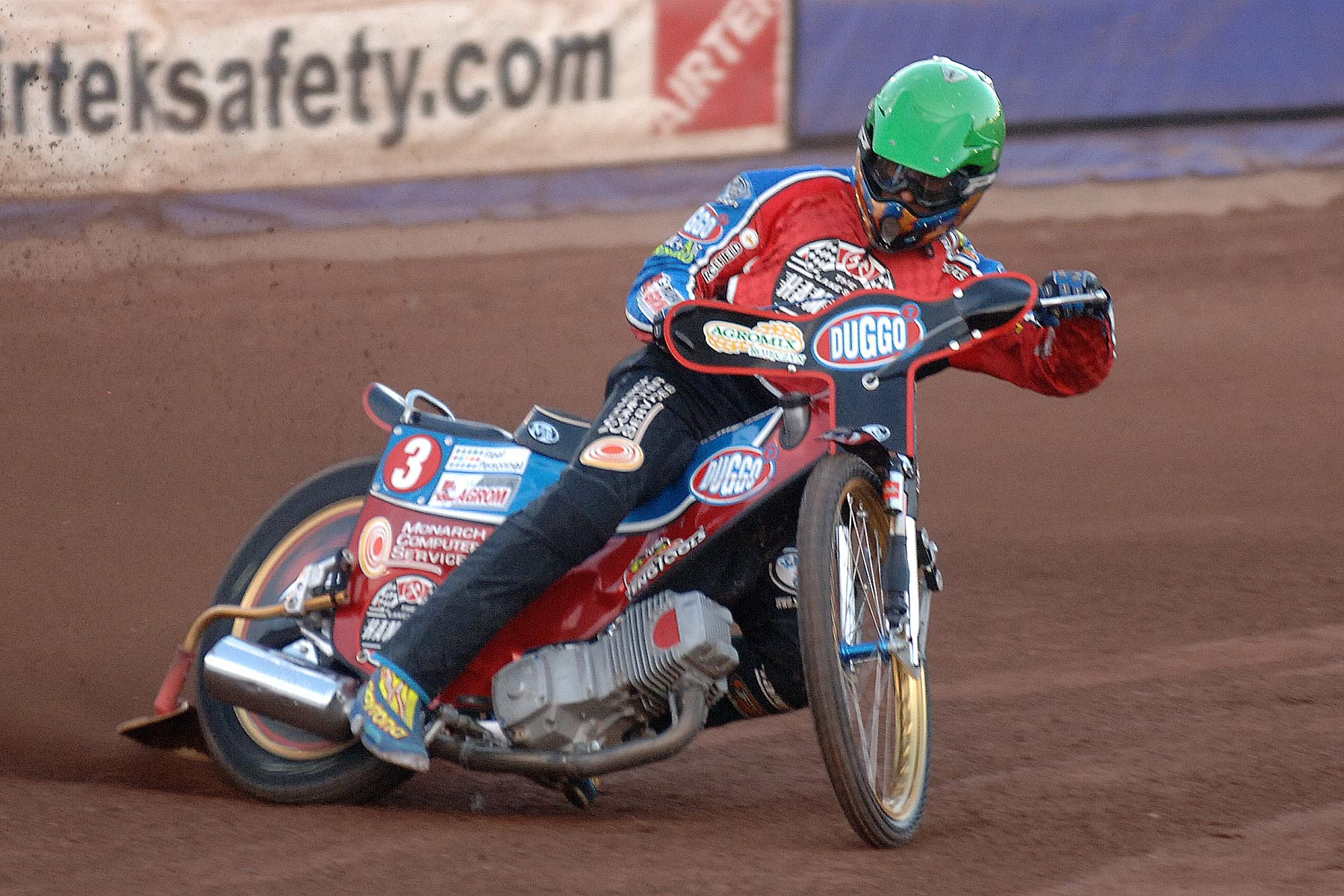
Kasprzak riding for Lakeside in 2007

In 2007, Kasprzak rode for Lakeside Hammers during the 2007 Elite League speedway season but the season highlight was winning his first major team honour as Poland won the 2007 Speedway World Cup. He top scored during the event with 14 points.

After joining Belle Vue Aces for the 2009 Elite League speedway season, Kasprzak top scored for the Manchester club and then won his second world team title, when Poland won the 2009 Speedway World Cup. The following season he was instrumental in helping Coventry Bees win the Elite League title during the 2010 Elite League speedway season. In 2011, he won his third world team title after winning the 2011 Speedway World Cup. He also joined Birmingham Brummies for the 2011 season.

In September 2012, during the Speedway Grand Prix Qualification, Kasprzak won the GP Challenge, which ensured that he claimed a permanent slot for the 2013 Grand Prix.

During the 2012 Elite League speedway season, Kasprzak helped Poole Pirates win the Knockout Cup and Elite Shield. In 2013, he returned to Coventry Bees for the 2013 season before leaving British Speedway for two years, while he competed in the 2014 and 2015 Grand Prix series. He won a fourth world team title in 2013 and then in 2014, he achieved his greatest success when finishing runner-up to Greg Hancock in the World Championship. The 2014 feat included three grand prix wins (European, Latvian and, Polish).

In 2016, Kasprzak returned to the Bees team for the third time, for the 2016 Elite League campaign and finished with a respectable 7.91 average. During 2016 he won his fifth world team title after winning the 2016 Speedway World Cup. In 2017, he was released by Poole after poor form and joined the Rye House Rockets for the SGB Premiership 2017 and SGB Premiership 2018 seasons.

In 2023, Kasprzak returned to British speedway after signing for King's Lynn Stars for the SGB Premiership 2023 but poor form saw him replaced by Artem Laguta.

== Family ==
Kasprzak is a son of former Polish national speedway team member Zenon Kasprzak. His brother Robert is also a speedway rider.

== Major results ==
=== World individual Championship ===
- 2004 Speedway Grand Prix - 34th
- 2005 Speedway Grand Prix - 22nd
- 2006 Speedway Grand Prix - 20th
- 2007 Speedway Grand Prix - 17th
- 2008 Speedway Grand Prix - 14th
- 2012 Speedway Grand Prix - 18th
- 2013 Speedway Grand Prix - 10th
- 2014 Speedway Grand Prix - 2nd including (European, Latvian and, Polish) grand prix wins
- 2015 Speedway Grand Prix - 15th
- 2016 Speedway Grand Prix - 20th
- 2017 Speedway Grand Prix - 24th
- 2018 Speedway Grand Prix - 19th
- 2021 Speedway Grand Prix - 16th

=== World team Championships ===
- 2004 Speedway World Cup - 4th
- 2006 Speedway World Cup - 5th
- 2007 Speedway World Cup - Winner
- 2009 Speedway World Cup - Winner
- 2011 Speedway World Cup - Winner
- 2013 Speedway World Cup - Winner
- 2014 Speedway World Cup - 2nd
- 2016 Speedway World Cup - Winner

== Speedway Grand Prix results ==
2004 Speedway Grand Prix Final Championship standings (Riding No 24)
Race no.	Grand Prix	Pos.	Pts.	Heats	Draw No
8 /9	(Poland) Polish SGP	20	3	(3,1,0)	24

2005 Speedway Grand Prix Final Championship standings (Riding No 16) (17)
Race no.	Grand Prix	Pos.	Pts.	Heats	Draw No
1 /9	(Europe) European SGP	15	4	(0,1,1,0,2)	7
8 /9	(Poland) Polish SGP	17	ns	ns	17

2006 Speedway Grand Prix Final Championship standings (Riding No 16)
Race no.	Grand Prix	Pos.	Pts.	Heats	Draw No
2 /10	(Europe) European SGP	11	6	(2,2,0,1,1)	13

2007 Speedway Grand Prix Final Championship standings (Riding No 16)
Race no.	Grand Prix	Pos.	Pts.	Heats	Draw No
9 /11	(Poland) Polish SGP	2	17	(3,0,3,3,2) +2 +2	13

permanent speedway rider
wild card, track reserve or qualified reserve
rider not classified (track reserve who did not start)

== See also ==
- List of Speedway Grand Prix riders
