= 2014 Swedish speedway season =

Motorcycle racing competition

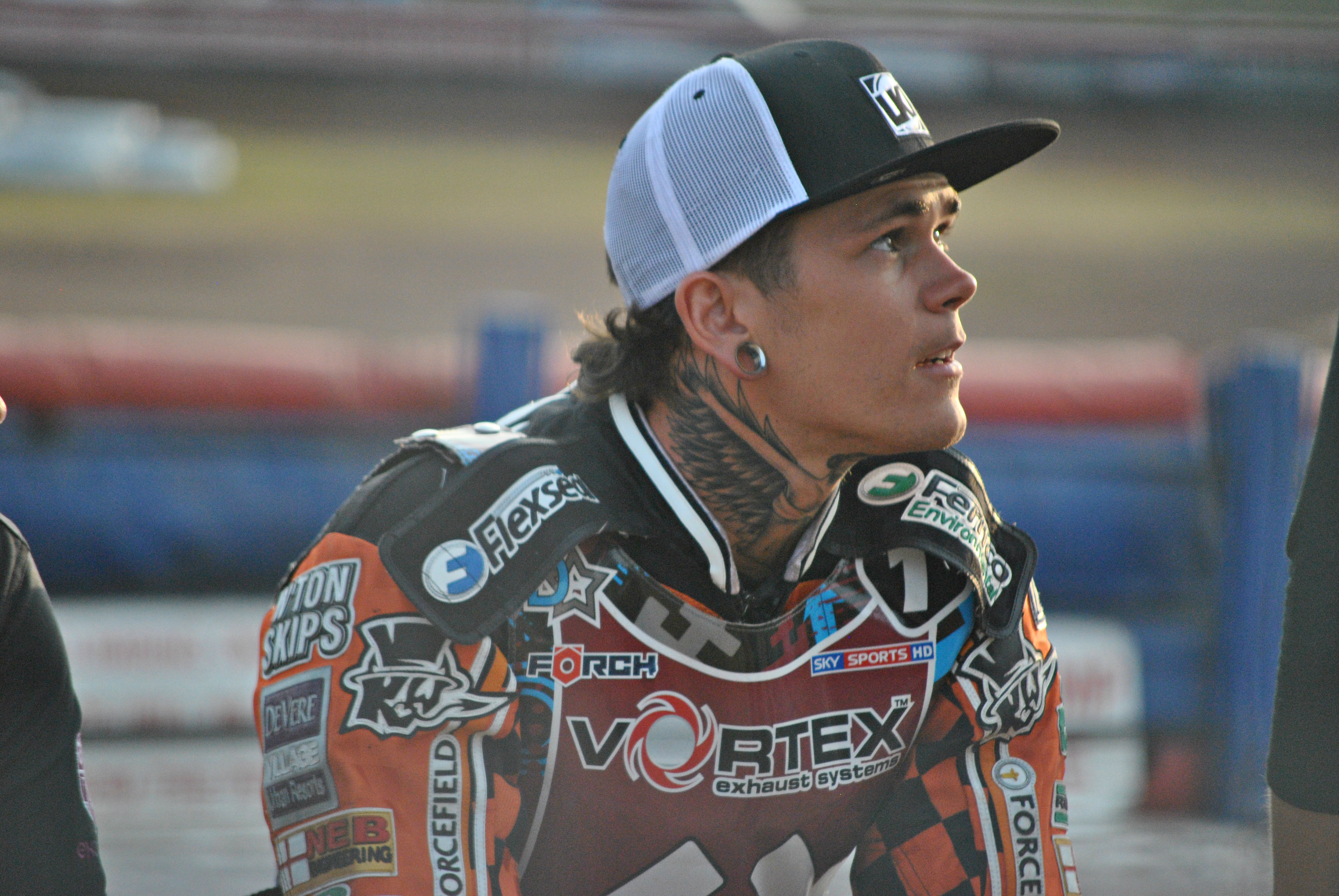
- Tai Woffinden helped Vetlanda win a seventh title.

The 2014 Swedish speedway season was the 2014 season of motorcycle speedway in Sweden.

== Individual ==
=== Individual Championship ===
The 2014 Swedish Individual Speedway Championship final was held in Nykoping on 5 September. Thomas H. Jonasson won the Swedish Championship.

Pos	Rider	Team	Pts	Total	SF	Final
1	Thomas H. Jonasson	Vetlanda	(3,1,3,3,3)	13		3
2	Kim Nilsson	Griparna	(1,3,3,2,3)	12		2
3	Freddie Lindgren	Indianerna	(3,2,2,ex,3)	10	3	1
4	Jonas Davidsson	Rospiggarna	(3,3,3,3,0)	12		0
5	Antonio Lindbäck	Indianerna	(1,3,3,1,2)	10	2	
6	Linus Sundström	Lejonen	(1,2,2,2,3)	10	1	
7	Mikael Max	Gnistorna	(2,3,1,1,2)	9	0	
8	Peter Karlsson	Smederna	(1,2,2,3,1)	9		
9	Magnus Zetterström	Smederna	(3,0,2,1,2)	8		
10	Oliver Berntzon	Smederna	(2,0,1,3,f)	6		
11	John Lindman	Griparna	(0,2,1,2,1)	6		
12	Mathias Thörnblom	Gnistorna	(2,r,f,0,2)	4		
13	Victor Palovaara	Valsarna	(0,1,0,2,1)	4		
14	Fredrik Engman	Piraterna	(2,1,0,f,1)	4		
15	David Ruud	Lejonen	(0,0,0,0,0)	0		
16	Pontus Aspgren	Lejonen	(0,u)	0		
17	Viktor Bergström (res)	Griparna	(1,1,r)	2		

Key

- points per race - 3 for a heat win, 2 for 2nd, 1 for third, 0 for last
- ex - excluded
- u - fell
- r - retired

=== U21 Championship ===
Fredrik Engman won the U21 championship for the second successive year.

== Team ==
=== Team Championship ===
Vetlanda won the Elitserien and were declared the winners of the Swedish Speedway Team Championship for the seventh time.

Lejonen won the Allsvenskan.

Elitserien
Pos	Team	Pts
1	Vetlanda	26
2	Piraterna	24
3	Rospiggarna	21
4	Indianerna	18
5	Dackarna	18
6	Smederna	13
7	Vargarna	11
8	Västervik	3

Allsvenskan
Pos	Team	Pts
1	Gnistorna	24
2	Lejonen	21
3	Griparna	18
4	Masarna	15
5	Örnarna	14
6	Valsarna	9
7	Hammarby	2

Play offs

Elitserien
Stage	Team	Team	Agg Score
QF	Rospiggarna	Smederna	99:81
QF	Indianerna	Dackarna	101:79
SF	Indianerna	Piraterna	100:80
SF	Vetlanda	Rospiggarna	100:80
Final	Vetlanda	Indianerna	103:76

Allsvenskan
Stage	Team	Team	Agg Score
SF	Lejonen	Griparna	106:74
SF	Masarna	Gnistorna	91:89
Final	Lejonen	Masarna	99:81
