= 2016 Swedish speedway season =

Motorcycle racing competition

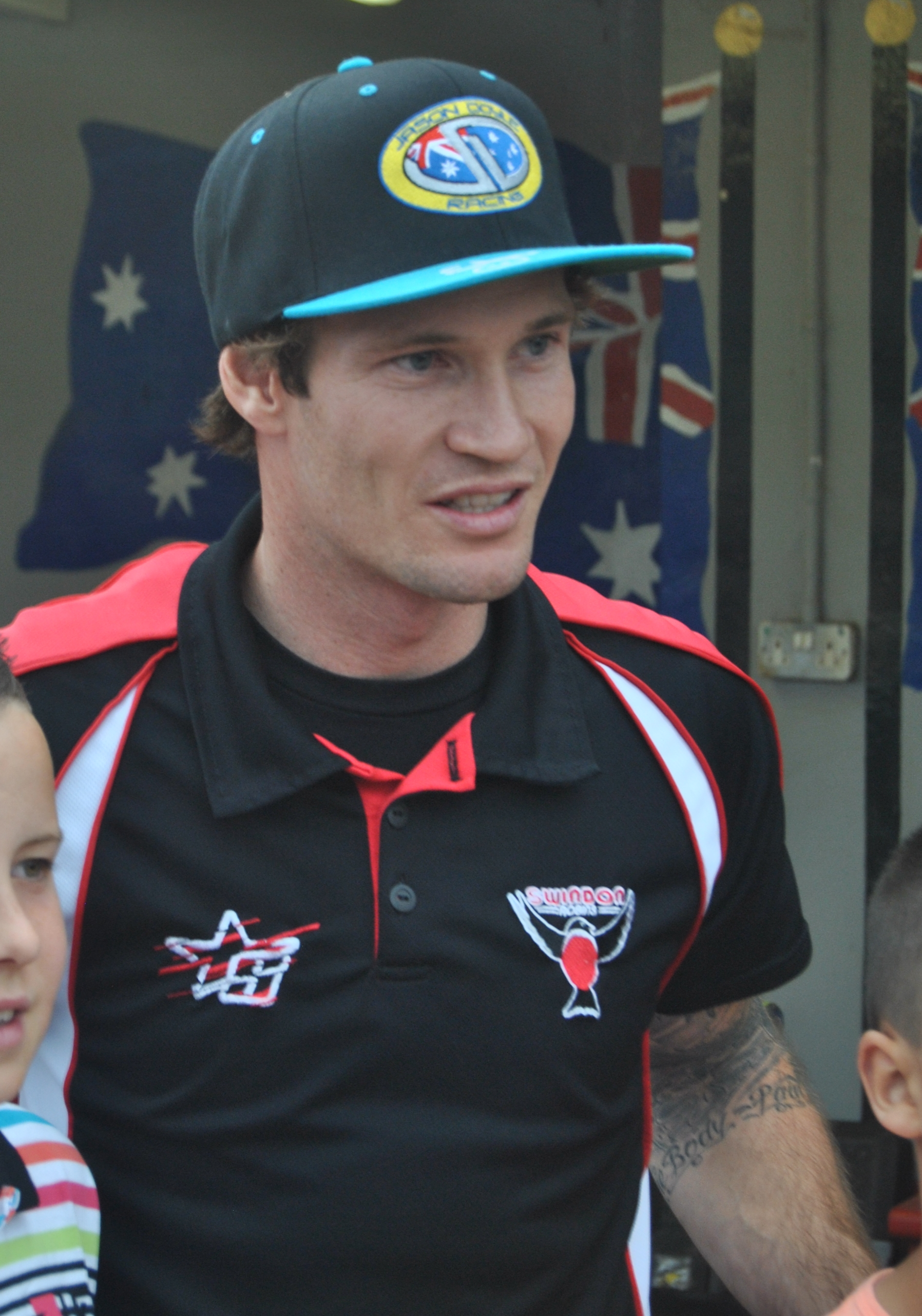
- Jason Doyle led Rospiggarna to the Elitserien title.

The 2016 Swedish speedway season was the 2016 season of motorcycle speedway in Sweden.

== Individual ==
=== Individual Championship ===
The 2016 Swedish Individual Speedway Championship final was held at the HZ Bygg Arena in Hallstavik on 23 July. Andreas Jonsson won the Swedish Championship for the seventh time.

Pos	Rider	Team	Pts	Total	SF	Final
1	Andreas Jonsson	Rospiggarna	(3,2,3,2,3)	13		3
2	Antonio Lindbäck	Indianerna	(1,2,1,3,3)	10	3	2
3	Kim Nilsson	Vargarna	(3,3,3,0,2)	11		1
4	Peter Ljung	Dackarna	(0,3,3,3,3)	12		0
5	Linus Sundström	Masarna	(2,3,3,1,2)	11	2	
6	Freddie Lindgren	Indianerna	(3,3,2,1,2)	11	1	
7	Pontus Aspgren	Vargarna	(2,1,1,3,3)	10	0	
8	Jacob Thorssell	Vastervik	(1,2,2,3,2)	10		
9	Oliver Berntzon	Vargarna	(3,2,0,2,0)	7		
10	Thomas H. Jonasson	Vetlanda	(2,0,2,2,1)	7		
11	Ludvig Lindgren	Valsarna	(2,1,1,1,0)	5		
12	Mathias Thörnblom	Gnistorna	(0,1,0,2,1)	4		
13	Linus Eklöf	Griparna	(1,0,2,0,0)	3		
14	Victor Palovaara	Valsarna	(1,1,0,0,1)	3		
15	Peter Karlsson	Lejonen	(0,0,1,1,0)	2		
16	Alex Edberg	Smederna	(0,0,0,0,1)	1		

Key

- points per race - 3 for a heat win, 2 for 2nd, 1 for third, 0 for last

=== U21 Championship ===
Joel Andersson won the U21 championship.

== Team ==
=== Team Championship ===
Rospiggarna won the Elitserien and were declared the winners of the Swedish Speedway Team Championship for the fifth time.

Västervik won the Allsvenskan. Gnistorna withdrew halfway through the season due to financial problems.

Elitserien
Pos	Team	Pts
1	Rospiggarna	27
2	Piraterna	22
3	Indianerna	21
4	Dackarna	19
5	Masarna	17
6	Vetlanda	14
7	Lejonen	8
8	Smederna	4

Allsvenskan
Pos	Team	Pts
1	Västervik	20
2	Griparna	11
3	Vargarna	10
4	Örnarna	5
5	Valsarna	4

Play offs

Elitserien
Stage	Team	Team	Agg Score
Final	Rospiggarna	Dackarna	101:79

Allsvenskan
Stage	Team	Team	Agg Score
QF	Valsarna	Ornarna	96:84
SF	Griparna	Valsarna	97:82
SF	Västervik	Vargarna	96:83
Final	Västervik	Griparna	96:84
