= 2017 Swedish speedway season =

Motorcycle racing competition

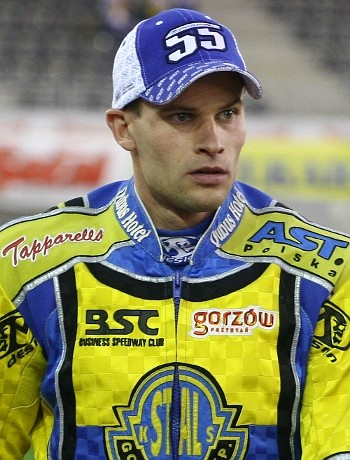
- Matej Žagar was part of the Smederna team that finished fifth in the regular season table but then won the play offs

The 2017 Swedish speedway season was the 2017 season of motorcycle speedway in Sweden.

== Individual ==
=== Individual Championship ===
The 2017 Swedish Individual Speedway Championship final was held in Avesta on 1 July. Antonio Lindbäck won the Swedish Championship for the second time.

Pos	Rider	Team	Pts	Total	SF	Final
1	Antonio Lindbäck	Masarna	(3,3,3,1,3)	13		3
2	Freddie Lindgren	Dackarna	(3,3,3,3,3)	15		2
3	Kim Nilsson	Masarna	(2,2,2,3,2)	11	3	1
4	Linus Sundström	Masarna	(3,3,2,2,3)	13		0
5	Joel Kling	Dackarna	(3,0,1,1,2)	7	2	
6	Andreas Jonsson	Rospiggarna	(2,1,3,3,0)	9	1	
7	Timo Lahti	Rospiggarna	(0,3,3,3,1)	10	0	
8	Thomas H. Jonasson	Ornarna	(0.2.1.0.3)	6		
9	Ludvig Lindgren	Indianerna	(2,0,1,2,1)	6		
10	Pontus Aspgren	Ornarna	(1,1,2,0,2)	6		
11	Mathias Thörnblom	Ornarna	(0,1,2,2,1)	6		
12	Jacob Thorssell	Rospiggarna	(t,2,1,1,2)	6		
13	Freddie Eriksson	Vastervik	(2,f,0,2,0)	4		
14	Victor Palovaara	Vastervik	(1,2,0,0,0)	3		
15	Magnus Karlsson	Ornarna	(1,1,0,0,1)	3		
16	Linus Eklöf	Griparna	(0,0,0,1,0)	1		
17	Joel Andersson (res)	Masarna	(1)	1		

Key

- points per race - 3 for a heat win, 2 for 2nd, 1 for third, 0 for last
- ef - engine failure
- t - tape touching excluded
- f - fell

=== U21 Championship ===
Alexander Woentin won the U21 championship.

== Team ==
=== Team Championship ===
Smederna won the Elitserien and were declared the winners of the Swedish Speedway Team Championship for the third time.

Västervik won the Allsvenskan.

Elitserien
Pos	Team	Pts
1	Vetlanda	28
2	Masarna	24
3	Dackarna	21
4	Lejonen	18
5	Smederna	15
6	Rospiggarna	13
7	Indianerna	11
8	Piraterna	10

Allsvenskan
Pos	Team	Pts
1	Västervik	20
2	Vargarna	14
3	Griparna	14
4	Örnarna	0

Play offs

Elitserien
Stage	Team	Team	Agg Score
QF	Smederna	Dackarna	92:87
QF	Rospiggarna	Lejonen	93:87
SF	Smederna	Masarna	96:86
SF	Vetlanda	Rospiggarna	106:
Final	Smederna	Vetlanda	95:85

Allsvenskan
Stage	Team	Team	Agg Score
SF	Vargarna	Griparna	95:84
Final	Västervik	Vargarna	94:86
