= 2013 Swedish speedway season =

Motorcycle racing competition

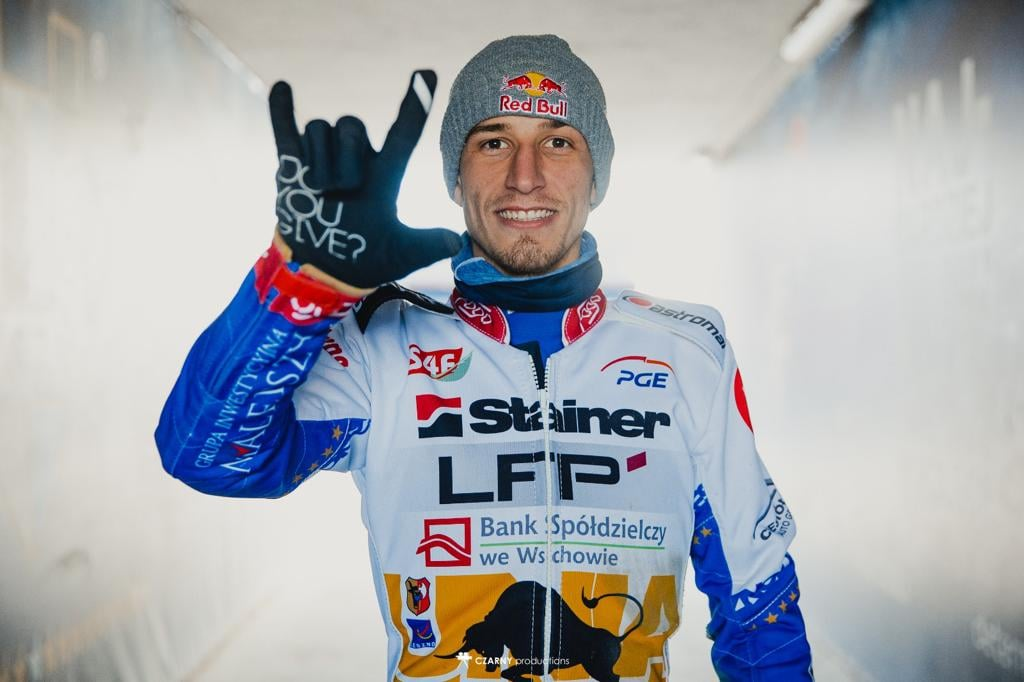
- Piotr Pawlicki (pictured) and his brother Przemysław helped Piraterna win the title

The 2013 Swedish speedway season was the 2013 season of motorcycle speedway in Sweden.

== Individual ==
=== Individual Championship ===
The 2013 Swedish Individual Speedway Championship final was held in Vetlanda on 30 August. Andreas Jonsson won the Swedish Championship for the sixth time.

Pos	Rider	Team	Pts	Total	SF	Final
1	Andreas Jonsson	Smederna	(2,1,2,3,3)	11	x	3
2	Jonas Davidsson	Lejonen	(3,3,3,3,3)	15	x	2
3	Peter Ljung	Vastervik	(3,3,3,3,2)	14	x	1
4	Kim Nilsson	Rospiggarna	(2,2,3,2,1)	10	3	0
5	Thomas H. Jonasson	Vetlanda	(3,3,2,0,2)	10	2	
6	Freddie Lindgren	Dackarna	(2,2,2,2,3)	11	1	
7	Daniel Nermark	Vastervik	(1,3,1,2,3)	10	0	
8	Joonas Kylmäkorpi	Ornarna	(1,2,3,1,2)	9		
9	Ludvig Lindgren	Griparna	(1,2,2,0,0)	5		
10	Simon Gustafsson	Rospiggarna	(0,1,r,3,0)	4		
11	Antonio Lindbäck	Indianerna	(3,0,0,r,1)	4		
12	Oliver Berntzon	Smederna	(2,0,1,0,1)	4		
13	Mikael Max	Hammarby	(0,1,1,1,1)	4		
14	Dennis Andersson	Dackarna	(0,0,0,1,2)	3		
15	Daniel Davidsson	Lejonen	(0,0,1,2,0)	3		
16	Anders Mellgren	Vargarna	(1,1,0,1,0)	3		

Key

- points per race - 3 for a heat win, 2 for 2nd, 1 for third, 0 for last
- r - retired

=== U21 Championship ===
Fredrik Engman won the U21 championship.

== Team ==
=== Team Championship ===
Piraterna won the Elitserien and were declared the winners of the Swedish Speedway Team Championship for the second time.

Rospiggarna won the Allsvenskan.

Elitserien
Pos	Team	Pts
1	Piraterna	24
2	Dackarna	24
3	Indianerna	20
4	Västervik	19
5	Smederna	18
6	Vetlanda	15
7	Vargarna	12
8	Hammarby	8

Allsvenskan
Pos	Team	Pts
1	Örnarna	18
2	Rospiggarna	16
3	Gnistorna	11
4	Masarna	11
5	Lejonen	11
6	Griparna	6

Play offs

Elitserien
Stage	Team	Team	Agg Score
QF	Vetlanda	Vastervik	106:74
QF	Smederna	Indianerna	91:89
SF	Vetlanda	Dackarna	96:84
SF	Piraterna	Smederna	99:81
Final	Piraterna	Vetlanda	95:85

Allsvenskan
Stage	Team	Team	Agg Score
SF	Rospiggarna	Gnistorna	103:77
SF	Ornarna	Masarna	104:76
Final	Rospiggarna	Ornarna	117:63

Division 1 North
Pos	Team	Pts
1	Griparna/Hammarby	16
2	Indianerna B	10
3	Masarna B	7
4	Valsarna	6
5	Smederna B	1

Division 1 South
Pos	Team	Pts
1	Malilla	10
2	Crossbone Pirates	7
3	Nassjo/Lejonen	5
4	Gnistorna B	2

- Final - Griparna/Hammarby v Malilla (48–36, 41–43)
