= 2018 Swedish speedway season =

Motorcycle racing competition

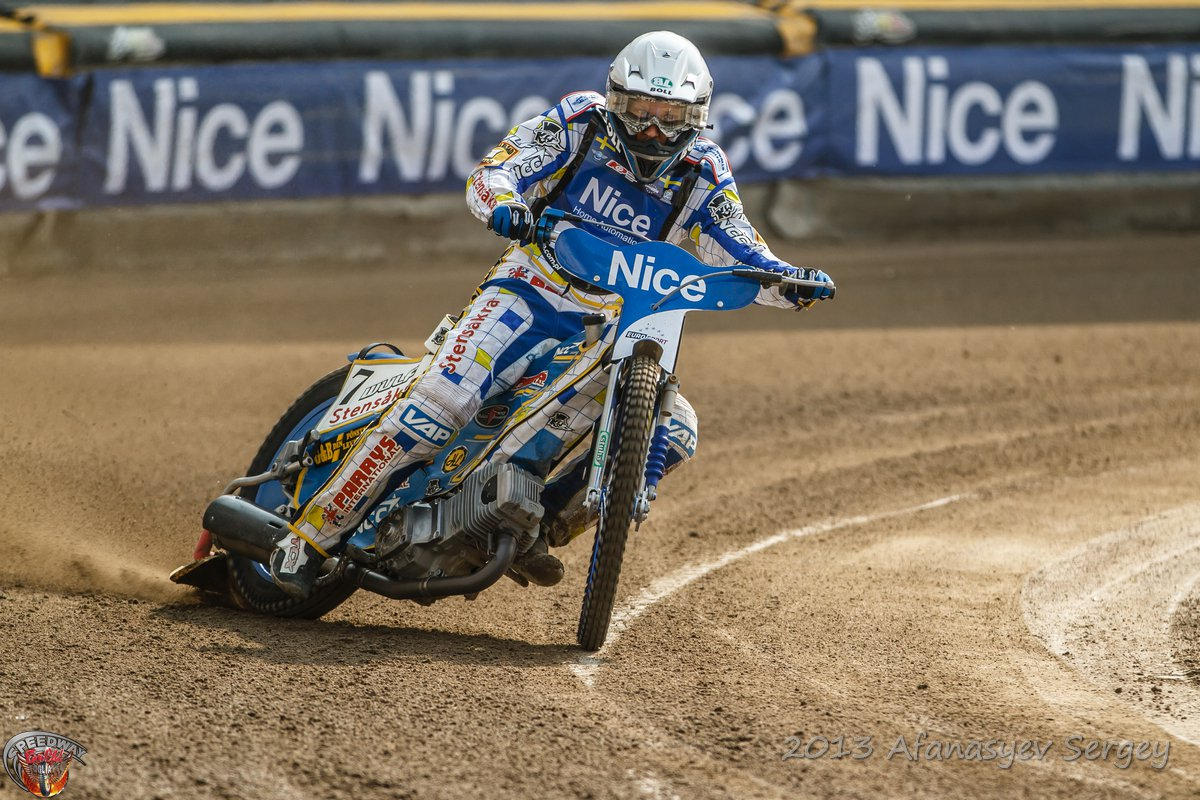
- Freddie Lindgren was the 2018 Swedish champion and helped Smederna retain the Elitserien.

The 2018 Swedish speedway season was the 2018 season of motorcycle speedway in Sweden.

== Individual ==
=== Individual Championship ===
The 2018 Swedish Individual Speedway Championship final was held at the Smedstadion in Eskilstuna on 4 August. Freddie Lindgren won the Swedish Championship.

Pos	Rider	Team	Pts	Total	SF	Final
1	Freddie Lindgren	Smederna	(3,3,3,2,3)	14		3
2	Oliver Berntzon	Dackarna	2,1,3,3,2)	10	3	2
3	Peter Ljung	Vastervik	(3,2,3,2,2)	12		1
4	Kim Nilsson	Masarna	(3,3,2,3,2)	13		0
5	Linus Sundström	Masarna	(2,2,3,3,1)	11	2	
6	Andreas Jonsson	Rospiggarna	(1,3,2,1,3)	10	1	
7	Pontus Aspgren	Smederna	(2,2,1,1,3)	9	0	
8	Antonio Lindbäck	Masarna	(r,1,1,3,3)	8		
9	Jacob Thorssell	Rospiggarna	(3,1,f,2,1)	7		
10	Joel Andersson	Masarna	(1,3,2,0,0)	6		
11	Victor Palovaara	Indianerna	(0,2,2,1,0)	5		
12	Mathias Thörnblom	Lejonen	(1,1,1,0,2)	5		
13	Linus Eklöf	Smederna	(0,0,1,2,1)	4		
14	Joel Kling	Dackarna	(2,0,0,1,1)	4		
15	Ludvig Lindgren	Indianerna	(1,0,0,0,0)	1		
16	Daniel Henderson	Vastervik	(0,0,0,0,0)	0		

Key

- points per race - 3 for a heat win, 2 for 2nd, 1 for third, 0 for last
- f - fell
- r - retired

=== U21 Championship ===
Joel Kling won the U21 championship.

== Team ==
=== Team Championship ===
Smederna won the Elitserien and were declared the winners of the Swedish Speedway Team Championship for the fourth time.

Piraterna won the Allsvenskan.

Elitserien
Pos	Team	Pts
1	Dackarna	28
2	Rospiggarna	23
3	Smederna	23
4	Vetlanda	23
5	Västervik	16
6	Indianerna	14
7	Lejonen	10
8	Masarna	3

Allsvenskan
Pos	Team	Pts
1	Griparna	23
2	Vargarna	18
3	Piraterna	16
4	Valsarna	9
5	Brassarna Nassjo	9
6	Team Rapid	0

Play offs

Elitserien
Stage	Team	Team	Agg Score
QF	Vastervik	Vetlanda	96:84
QF	Smederna	Indianerna	106:74
SF	Smederna	Rospiggarna	91:89
SF	Dackarna	Vastervik	99:81
Final	Smederna	Dackarna	99:81

Allsvenskan
Stage	Team	Team	Agg Score
SF	Piraterna	Vargarna	91:87
SF	Griparna	Valsarna	111:79
Final	Piraterna	Griparna	98:82
