= 2019 Swedish speedway season =

Motorcycle speedway season

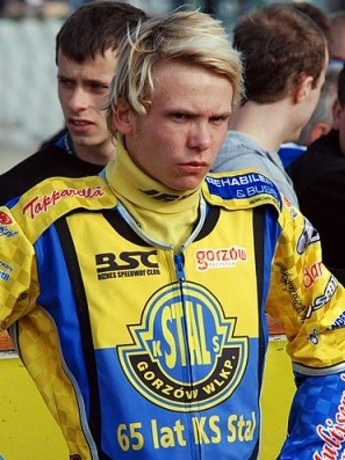
- Michael Jepsen Jensen was instrumental in helping Smederna win a third consecutive Elitserien.

The 2019 Swedish speedway season was the 2019 season of motorcycle speedway in Sweden.

== Individual ==
=== Individual Championship ===
The 2019 Swedish Individual Speedway Championship final was held at the Credentia Arena in Hallstavik on 27 July 2019.

The title was won by Jacob Thorssell.

Pos	Rider	Team	Pts	Total	SF	Final
1	Jacob Thorssell	Dackarna	(1,2,3,2,2)	10	3	3
2	Andreas Jonsson	Rospiggarna	(2,3,3,2,3)	13		2
3	Kim Nilsson	Masarna	(3,0,3,3,3)	12		1
4	Linus Sundström	Piraterna	(2,3,2,3,3)	13		0
5	Ludvig Lindgren	Indianerna	(1,2,2,3,2)	10	2	
6	Victor Palovaara	Vetlanda	(3,1,d,3,2)	9	1	
7	Pontus Aspgren	Smederna	(3,2,1,d,3)	9	0	
8	Joel Andersson	Indianerna	(2,3,1,1,2)	9		
9	Peter Ljung	Vastervik	(x,3,2,2,1)	8		
10	Filip Hjelmland	Vetlanda	(3,1,1,2,x)	7		
11	Thomas H. Jonasson	Rospiggarna	(0,1,3,1,x)	5		
12	Daniel Henderson	Team Rapid	(1,2,0,0,1)	4		
13	Joel Kling	Dackarna	(1,1,0,1,1)	4		
14	Christoffer Selvin	Indianerna	(0,0,2,1,0)	3		
15	John Lindman	Vastervik	(2,x,x,0,0)	2		
16	Rasmus Broberg	Team Rapid	(0,0,1,0,0)	1		

=== U21 Championship ===
Winner - Alexander Woentin

== Team ==
=== Team Championship ===
Smederna won the Elitserien.

Griparna won the Allsvenskan (second-tier league).

Elitserien
Pos	Team	Pts
1	Dackarna	29
2	Vetlanda	27
3	Västervik	25
4	Smederna	25
5	Lejonen	21
6	Indianerna	21
7	Piraterna	12
8	Rospiggarna	11
8	Masarna	9

Allsvenskan
Pos	Team	Pts
1	Team Rapid	21
2	Vargarna	16
3	Griparna	11
4	Team Småland	11
5	VIP Speedway	9
6	Valsarna	7

Play offs

Elitserien
Stage	Team	Team	Agg Score
QF	Smederna	Lejonen	97:83
QF	Vastervik	Indianerna	91:89
SF	Dackarna	Vastervik	95:85
SF	Smederna	Vetlanda	91:88
Final	Smederna	Dackarna	107:73

Allsvenskan
Stage	Team	Team	Agg Score
SF	Team Rapid	Team Småland	102:78
SF	Griparna	Vargarna	92:82
Final	Griparna	Team Rapid	91:88
