= 2023 Speedway Grand Prix of Germany =

Speedway Grand Prix event

- Venue: Bergring Arena
- Location: Teterow (Germany)
- Start date: 10 June 2023
- Competitors: 16 (2 reserves)

The 2023 FIM Speedway Grand Prix of Germany was the fourth race of the 2023 Speedway Grand Prix season. It took place on 10 June at the Bergring Arena in Teterow, Germany. It was the 13th Speedway Grand Prix of Germany.

The event was won by defending world champion Bartosz Zmarzlik (his 20th career Grand Prix win).

== Grand Prix result ==
Placing	Rider	1	2	3	4	5	6	7	8	9	10	11	12	13	14	15	16	17	18	19	20	Pts	SF1	SF2	Final	GP Pts
1	(Poland) (9) Bartosz Zmarzlik			2		2						3					3		3			13	3		3	20
2	(Australia) (10) Jason Doyle			3			1						1			1		3				9	2		2	18
3	(Australia) (13) Jack Holder				1	3							2		2					1		9		3	1	16
4	(Sweden) (11) Kim Nilsson			0				2		2					3						0	7		2	0	14
5	(Denmark) (1) Leon Madsen	3				1				0				3				2				9		1		12
6	(Denmark) (3) Anders Thomsen	2						3				1				0				3		9	1			11
7	(United Kingdom) (6) Robert Lambert		2				2			3							2			1		10	0			10
8	(United Kingdom) (5) Dan Bewley		3			0					2					3					3	11		m		9
9	(United Kingdom) (7) Tai Woffinden		0					0					3	2					2			7				8
10	(Slovakia) (14) Martin Vaculík				2		3					x		0							2	7				7
11	(Poland) (16) Patryk Dudek				0				3	1						2			1			7				6
12	(Sweden) (12) Freddie Lindgren			1					0		3			1						0		5				5
13	(Poland) (15) Maciej Janowski				3			1			0						0	1				5				4
14	(Australia) (4) Max Fricke	0							2				0				1				1	4				3
15	(Denmark) (8) Mikkel Michelsen		1						1			2			0			0				4				2
16	(Germany) (2) Kai Huckenbeck	1					0				1				1				0			3				1
R1	(Germany) (R1) Norick Blödorn																					0	R1			
R2	(Germany) (R2) Michael Härtel																					0	R2			

m - exclusion for exceeding two minute time allowance • t - exclusion for touching the tapes • x - other exclusion • e - retired or mechanical failure • f - fell • ns - non-starter • nc - non-classify

gate A - inside	gate B	gate C	gate D - outside
