= 2023 Speedway Grand Prix of Poland =

Speedway Grand Prix event

- Venue: Stadion Narodowy; Edward Jancarz Stadium; MotoArena Toruń
- Location: Warsaw; Gorzów; Toruń
- Start date: 13 May; 24 June; 30 September
- Competitors: 16 (2 reserves)

The 2023 FIM Speedway Grand Prix of Poland was the second, fifth and tenth rounds of the 2023 Speedway Grand Prix season (the World Championship).

The second round took place on 13 May 2023 at the Stadion Narodowy in Warsaw. The fifth round took place at the Edward Jancarz Stadium in Gorzów Wielkopolski on 24 June and the tenth and final round was held on 30 September at the MotoArena Toruń in Toruń.

The rounds were the 58th to 60th Speedway Grand Prix of Poland respectively.

Swede Freddie Lindgren won the Warsaw Grand Prix (his 6th career Grand Prix win) and Bartosz Zmarzlik won both the Gorzów and Toruń Grand Prix (his 21st & 23rd career Grand Prix wins). By winning his 23rd Grand Prix he equalled the record set by Jason Crump and sealed his fourth world title.

== Results ==
=== Event 1 - Warsaw Grand Prix (13 May) ===
Placing	Rider	1	2	3	4	5	6	7	8	9	10	11	12	13	14	15	16	17	18	19	20	Pts	SF1	SF2	Final	GP Pts
1	(Sweden) (13) Freddie Lindgren				2	2							0		3					2		9	2		3	20
2	(Australia) (12) Jack Holder			3					2		2			1						3		11		3	2	18
3	(Poland) (5) Bartosz Zmarzlik		f			1					3					3					2	9		2	1	16
4	(Australia) (16) Jason Doyle				3				3	3						2			2			13	3		0	14
5	(Slovakia) (4) Martin Vaculík	2							1				3				2				3	11		1		12
6	(Australia) (14) Max Fricke				1		3					2		2							1	9	1			11
7	(United Kingdom) (8) Dan Bewley		3						0			3			1			2				9	0			10
8	(United Kingdom) (9) Tai Woffinden			1		3						0					3		0			7		0		9
9	(Denmark) (7) Leon Madsen		2					0					1	3					1			7				8
10	(Poland) (10) Maciej Janowski			2			2						2			1		0				7				7
11	(Denmark) (1) Mikkel Michelsen	3				0				0				0				3				6				6
12	(United Kingdom) (2) Robert Lambert	1					0				0				2				3			6				5
13	(Poland) (3) Bartłomiej Kowalski	0						3				1				0				0		4				4
14	(Denmark) (11) Anders Thomsen			0				2		2					0						0	4				3
15	(Sweden) (15) Kim Nilsson				0			1			1						1	1				4				2
16	(Poland) (6) Patryk Dudek		1				1			1							0			1		4				1
R1	(Poland) (R1) Wiktor Przyjemski																					0	R1			
R2	(Poland) (R2) Kacper Pludra																					0	R2			

m - exclusion for exceeding two minute time allowance • t - exclusion for touching the tapes • x - other exclusion • e - retired or mechanical failure • f - fell • ns - non-starter • nc - non-classify

gate A - inside	gate B	gate C	gate D - outside

=== Event 2 - Gorzów Grand Prix (24 June) ===
Placing	Rider	1	2	3	4	5	6	7	8	9	10	11	12	13	14	15	16	17	18	19	20	Pts	SF1	SF2	Final	GP Pts
1	(Poland) (9) Bartosz Zmarzlik			1		3						3					3		3			13	3		3	20
2	(Denmark) (1) Leon Madsen	3				1				3				1				3				11		2	2	18
3	(Sweden) (14) Freddie Lindgren				2		3					2		3							0	10		3	1	16
4	(Australia) (5) Jason Doyle		0			2					3					3					2	10	2		f	14
5	(United Kingdom) (4) Robert Lambert	1							3				3				1				3	11		1		12
6	(Australia) (6) Jack Holder		1				1			2							2			3		9	1			11
7	(Poland) (10) Maciej Janowski			2			2						2			2		2				10	0			10
8	(United Kingdom) (2) Tai Woffinden	2					0				2				2				2			8		0		9
9	(United Kingdom) (16) Dan Bewley				3				2	0						1			1			7				8
10	(Australia) (12) Max Fricke			3					1		1			0						1		6				7
11	(Denmark) (8) Anders Thomsen		3						0			1			1			1				6				6
12	(Poland) (7) Patryk Dudek		2					2					0	2					0			6				5
13	(Denmark) (11) Mikkel Michelsen			0				0		1					3						1	5				4
14	(Slovakia) (15) Martin Vaculík				1			3			e						0	0				4				3
15	(Sweden) (3) Kim Nilsson	0						1				0				0				2		3				2
16	(Poland) (13) Szymon Woźniak				0	0							1		0					0		1				1
R1	(Poland) (R1) Oskar Fajfer																					0	R1			
R2	(Poland) (R2) Wiktor Jasinski																					0	R2			

m - exclusion for exceeding two minute time allowance • t - exclusion for touching the tapes • x - other exclusion • e - retired or mechanical failure • f - fell • ns - non-starter • nc - non-classify

gate A - inside	gate B	gate C	gate D - outside

=== Event 3 - Toruń Grand Prix (30 September) ===
Placing	Rider	1	2	3	4	5	6	7	8	9	10	11	12	13	14	15	16	17	18	19	20	Pts	SF1	SF2	Final	GP Pts
1	(Poland) (12) Bartosz Zmarzlik			3					1		3			2						3		12	3		3	20
2	(Sweden) (5) Freddie Lindgren		2			2					1					3					2	10		3	2	18
3	(Denmark) (13) Leon Madsen				2	3							3		0					1		9		2	1	16
4	(Poland) (8) Patryk Dudek		3						0			2			1			2				8	2		0	14
5	(Slovakia) (15) Martin Vaculík				3			3			2						2	0				10		1		12
6	(United Kingdom) (2) Robert Lambert	3					0				0				3				3			9	1			11
7	(Australia) (14) Jack Holder				1		3					3		1							1	9	0			10
8	(Australia) (7) Max Fricke		1					2					2	3					0			8		0		9
9	(Australia) (10) Jason Doyle			2			2						1			2		1				8				8
10	(Latvia) (1) Andžejs Ļebedevs	2				1				1				0				3				7				7
11	(United Kingdom) (9) Dan Bewley			1		0						1					3		2			7				6
12	(Germany) (4) Kai Huckenbeck	0							3				0				0				3	6				5
13	(Poland) (6) Dominik Kubera		0				1			3							1			0		5				4
14	(Denmark) (11) Mikkel Michelsen			0				1		2					2						0	5				3
15	(United States) (16) Luke Becker				0				2	0						1			1			4				2
16	(Sweden) (3) Kim Nilsson	1						0				0				0				2		3				1
R1	(Poland) (R1) Bartłomiej Kowalski																					0	R1			
R2	(Poland) (R2) Mateusz Cierniak																					0	R2			

m - exclusion for exceeding two minute time allowance • t - exclusion for touching the tapes • x - other exclusion • e - retired or mechanical failure • f - fell • ns - non-starter • nc - non-classify

gate A - inside	gate B	gate C	gate D - outside
