= 2023 Speedway Grand Prix of Great Britain =

Speedway Grand Prix event

- Venue: Principality Stadium
- Location: Cardiff (Wales)
- Start date: 2 September 2023
- Competitors: 16 (2 reserves)

The 2023 FIM Speedway Grand Prix of Great Britain was the eighth round of the 2023 Speedway Grand Prix season (the World Championship of speedway). It took place on 2 September at the Principality Stadium in Cardiff, Wales. It was the 27th Speedway Grand Prix of Great Britain.

The event was won by Martin Vaculík (his 7th career Grand Prix win).

== Grand Prix result ==
| Placing | Rider | 1 | 2 | 3 | 4 | 5 | 6 | 7 | 8 | 9 | 10 | 11 | 12 | 13 | 14 | 15 | 16 | 17 | 18 | 19 | 20 | Pts | SF1 | SF2 | Final | GP Pts |
|---|---|---|---|---|---|---|---|---|---|---|---|---|---|---|---|---|---|---|---|---|---|---|---|---|---|---|
| 1 | (Slovakia) (8) Martin Vaculík | | 2 | | | | | | 2 | | | 2 | | | 0 | | | 3 | | | | 9 | | 2 | 3 | 20 |
| 2 | (Australia) (16) Jack Holder | | | | 1 | | | | 3 | 2 | | | | | | 3 | | | 3 | | | 12 | 2 | | 2 | 18 |
| 3 | (Poland) (15) Bartosz Zmarzlik | | | | 2 | | | 1 | | | 2 | | | | | | 2 | 1 | | | | 8 | | 3 | 1 | 16 |
| 4 | (Sweden) (13) Freddie Lindgren | | | | x | 3 | | | | | | | 2 | | 2 | | | | | 2 | | 9 | 3 | | 0 | 14 |
| 5 | (United Kingdom) (12) Robert Lambert | | | 1 | | | | | 1 | | 3 | | | 3 | | | | | | 3 | | 11 | | 1 | | 12 |
| 6 | (Sweden) (5) Kim Nilsson | | 3 | | | 1 | | | | | 1 | | | | | 2 | | | | | 1 | 8 | 1 | | | 11 |
| 7 | (Poland) (11) Patryk Dudek | | | 0 | | | | 2 | | 3 | | | | | 3 | | | | | | 0 | 8 | | 0 | | 10 |
| 8 | (Australia) (3) Max Fricke | 1 | | | | | | 3 | | | | 3 | | | | 0 | | | | 1 | | 8 | 0 | | | 9 |
| 9 | (United Kingdom) (6) Dan Bewley | | 0 | | | | 3 | | | 1 | | | | | | | 3 | | | t | | 7 | | | | 8 |
| 10 | (Latvia) (4) Andžejs Ļebedevs | 2 | | | | | | | 0 | | | | 1 | | | | 1 | | | | 3 | 7 | | | | 7 |
| 11 | (Australia) (10) Jason Doyle | | | 2 | | | 2 | | | | | | x | | | 2 | | 2 | | | | 8 | | | | 6 |
| 12 | (Denmark) (14) Mikkel Michelsen | | | | 3 | | 1 | | | | | 0 | | 0 | | | | | | | 2 | 6 | | | | 5 |
| 13 | (United Kingdom) (9) Tai Woffinden | | | 3 | | 3 | | | | | | 1 | | | | | x | | ns | | | 7 | | | | 4 |
| 14 | (Poland) (7) Maciej Janowski | | 1 | | | | | 0 | | | | | 3 | 1 | | | | | 1 | | | 6 | | | | 3 |
| 15 | (Denmark) (1) Leon Madsen | 3 | | | | 0 | | | | 0 | | | | 2 | | | | 0 | | | | 5 | | | | 2 |
| 16 | (United Kingdom) (2) Steve Worrall | 0 | | | | | 0 | | | | 0 | | | | 1 | | | | 2 | | | 3 | | | | 1 |
| R1 | (United Kingdom) (R1) Jason Edwards | | | | | | | | | | | | | | | | | | | 0 | | 0 | R1 | | | |
| R2 | (United Kingdom) (R2) Anders Rowe | | | | | | | | | | | | | | | | | | 0 | | | 0 | R2 | | | |

m - exclusion for exceeding two minute time allowance • t - exclusion for touching the tapes • x - other exclusion • e - retired or mechanical failure • f - fell • ns - non-starter • nc - non-classify

| gate A - inside | gate B | gate C | gate D - outside |
