= 2023 Speedway Grand Prix =

29th season of Speedway Grand Pix

Season details
- Dates: 29 April – 30 September
- Events: 10
- Cities: 10
- Countries: 8
- Riders: 15 permanents 1 wild card(s); 2 track reserves
- Heats: 230 (in 10 events)

Winners
- Champion: POL Bartosz Zmarzlik
- Runner-up: SWE Fredrik Lindgren
- 3rd place: SVK Martin Vaculík

The 2023 Speedway Grand Prix season was the 29th season of the Speedway Grand Prix era, and decided the 78th FIM Speedway World Championship. It was the second series promoted by Discovery Sports Events.

Bartosz Zmarzlik was the defending champion, having won the 2022 title.

Zmarzlik successfully retained the title, winning a fourth championship, despite being disqualified from round nine in Denmark. He beat Fredrik Lindgren by eight points, with Martin Vaculík securing the bronze medal. During the championships, Zmarzlik secured four Grand Prix wins after the Latvian Grand Prix, which equalled the 22 career Grand Prix wins of fellow Pole Tomasz Gollob. He then went on to win a fifth Grand Prix, which equalled the all-time record of 23 held by Jason Crump.

== Qualification ==
For the 2023 season there were 15 permanent riders, who were joined at each Grand Prix by one wild card and two track reserves.

The top six riders from the 2022 championship qualified automatically. These riders were joined by the three riders who qualified via the Grand Prix Challenge.

The final six riders were nominated by the SGP Commission.

=== Qualified riders ===
#	Riders	2022 place	GP Ch place	Appearance	Previous appearances in series
95	(Poland) Bartosz Zmarzlik	1	—	8th	2012–2015, 2016–2022
30	(Denmark) Leon Madsen	2	—	5th	2010, 2013, 2019–2022
71	(Poland) Maciej Janowski	3	—	9th	2008, 2012, 2014, 2015–2022
66	(Sweden) Fredrik Lindgren	4	—	14th	2004, 2006–2007, 2008–2014, 2016, 2017–2022
505	(United Kingdom) Robert Lambert	5	5	3rd	2015, 2018–2019, 2021–2022
99	(United Kingdom) Dan Bewley	6	2	2nd	2018, 2022
692	(Poland) Patryk Dudek	7	—	6th	2016, 2017–2020, 2022
108	(United Kingdom) Tai Woffinden	8	—	12th	2010, 2011, 2013–2022
54	(Slovakia) Martin Vaculík	9	—	8th	2012, 2013, 2017–2022
69	(Australia) Jason Doyle	10	—	9th	2015–2022
155	(Denmark) Mikkel Michelsen	11	—	3rd	2015, 2018–2019, 2020, 2021, 2022
105	(Denmark) Anders Thomsen	14	10	3rd	2016, 2020, 2021–2022
233	(Sweden) Kim Nilsson	—	1	1st	2012–2014, 2016–2017
25	(Australia) Jack Holder	12	3	2nd	2016, 2020, 2022
46	(Australia) Max Fricke	13	4	4th	2016–2017, 2019, 2020–2022

=== Qualified substitutes ===
The following riders were nominated as substitutes:

#	Riders	2022 place	GP Ch place
29	(Latvia) Andžejs Ļebedevs	16	9
201	(Czech Republic) Jan Kvěch	27	—
744	(Germany) Kai Huckenbeck	20	—
22	(United States) Luke Becker	—	—
TBC	(France) Dimitri Bergé	—	—
TBC	(Finland) Timi Salonen	—	—
TBC	(Ukraine) Marko Levishyn	—	—

== Calendar ==
The 2023 season consisted of 10 events.

Round	Date	City and venue	Winner	Runner-up	3rd placed	4th placed	Results
1	29 April	(Croatia) Goričan, Croatia; Stadium Milenium	(Poland) Bartosz Zmarzlik	(United Kingdom) Robert Lambert	(Sweden) Fredrik Lindgren	(Australia) Jason Doyle	results
2	13 May	(Poland) Warsaw, Poland; Stadion Narodowy	(Sweden) Fredrik Lindgren	(Australia) Jack Holder	(Poland) Bartosz Zmarzlik	(Australia) Jason Doyle	results
3	3 June	(Czech Republic) Prague, Czech Republic; Markéta Stadium	(Slovakia) Martin Vaculík	(Denmark) Leon Madsen	(Australia) Jack Holder	(Poland) Bartosz Zmarzlik	results
4	10 June	(Germany) Teterow, Germany; Bergring Arena	(Poland) Bartosz Zmarzlik	(Australia) Jason Doyle	(Australia) Jack Holder	(Sweden) Kim Nilsson	results
5	24 June	Gorzów, Poland; Edward Jancarz Stadium	(Poland) Bartosz Zmarzlik	(Denmark) Leon Madsen	(Sweden) Fredrik Lindgren	(Australia) Jason Doyle	results
6	15 July	(Sweden) Målilla, Sweden; Skrotfrag Arena	(United Kingdom) Dan Bewley	(Slovakia) Martin Vaculík	(Poland) Patryk Dudek	(Sweden) Fredrik Lindgren	results
7	12 August	(Latvia) Riga, Latvia; Biķernieki Riga Stadium	(Poland) Bartosz Zmarzlik	(Sweden) Fredrik Lindgren	(Slovakia) Martin Vaculík	(United Kingdom) Tai Woffinden	results
8	2 September	(United Kingdom) Cardiff, Great Britain; Principality Stadium	(Slovakia) Martin Vaculík	(Australia) Jack Holder	(Poland) Bartosz Zmarzlik	(Sweden) Fredrik Lindgren	results
9	16 September	(Denmark) Vojens, Denmark; Vojens Speedway Center	(Denmark) Leon Madsen	(Sweden) Fredrik Lindgren	(Australia) Jack Holder	(United Kingdom) Robert Lambert	results
10	30 September	Toruń, Poland; Rose Motoarena	(Poland) Bartosz Zmarzlik	(Sweden) Fredrik Lindgren	(Denmark) Leon Madsen	(Poland) Patryk Dudek	results

== Final classification ==
Qualifies for next season's Grand Prix series
Full-time Grand Prix rider
Wild card, track reserve or qualified reserve

Pos.	Rider	Points	CRO (Croatia)	POL (Poland)	CZE (Czech Republic)	GER (Germany)	PL2 (Poland)	SWE (Sweden)	LAT (Latvia)	GBR (United Kingdom)	DEN (Denmark)	PL3 (Poland)
Gold	(Poland) (95) Bartosz Zmarzlik	158	20	16	14	20	20	12	20	16	–	20
Silver	(Sweden) (66) Fredrik Lindgren	150	16	20	11	5	16	14	18	14	18	18
Bronze	(Slovakia) (54) Martin Vaculík	125	9	12	20	7	3	18	16	20	8	12
4	(Australia) (25) Jack Holder	123	8	18	16	16	11	10	–	18	16	10
5	(Denmark) (30) Leon Madsen	111	4	8	18	12	18	3	10	2	20	16
6	(United Kingdom) (505) Robert Lambert	108	18	5	9	10	12	9	8	12	14	11
7	(United Kingdom) (99) Dan Bewley	104	10	10	12	9	8	20	9	8	12	6
8	(Australia) (69) Jason Doyle	96	14	14	8	18	14	1	12	6	1	8
9	(Australia) (46) Max Fricke	83	7	11	6	3	7	11	11	9	9	9
10	(Poland) (692) Patryk Dudek	76	6	1	10	6	5	16	4	10	4	14
11	(United Kingdom) (108) Tai Woffinden	64	12	9	3	8	9	5	14	4	–	–
12	(Denmark) (155) Mikkel Michelsen	56	11	6	5	2	4	4	5	5	11	3
13	(Sweden) (233) Kim Nilsson	44	2	2	2	14	2	–	3	11	7	1
14	(Poland) (71) Maciej Janowski	43	3	7	7	4	10	2	7	3	–	–
15	(Denmark) (105) Anders Thomsen	36	5	3	4	11	6	7	0	–	–	–
16	(Latvia) (29) Andžejs Ļebedevs	30	–	–	–	–	–	8	6	7	2	7
17	(Germany) (744) Kai Huckenbeck	11	–	–	–	1	–	–	–	–	5	5
18	(Denmark) (17) Mads Hansen	10	–	–	–	–	–	–	–	–	10	–
19	(Sweden) (16) Jacob Thorssell	6	–	–	–	–	–	6	–	–	–	–
20	(Denmark) (16) Rasmus Jensen	6	–	–	–	–	–	–	–	–	6	–
21	(Poland) (17) Bartłomiej Kowalski	4	–	4	–	–	–	–	–	–	–	–
22	(Poland) (16) Dominik Kubera	4	–	–	–	–	–	–	–	–	–	4
23	(Denmark) (18) Benjamin Basso	3	–	–	–	–	–	–	–	–	3	–
24	(Latvia) (16) Francis Gusts	2	–	–	–	–	–	–	2	–	–	–
25	(United States) (22) Luke Becker	2	–	–	–	–	–	–	–	–	–	2
26	(Slovenia) (16) Matej Žagar	1	1	–	–	–	–	–	–	–	–	–
27	(Czech Republic) (16) Václav Milík	1	–	–	1	–	–	–	–	–	–	–
28	(Poland) (16) Szymon Woźniak	1	–	–	–	–	1	–	–	–	–	–
29	(Latvia) (18) Ernest Matjuszonok	1	–	–	–	–	–	–	1	–	–	–
30	(United Kingdom) (16) Steve Worrall	1	–	–	–	–	–	–	–	1	–	–
31	(Slovenia) (17) Nick Škorja	0	0	–	–	–	–	–	–	–	–	–
32	(Latvia) (17) Ričards Ansviesulis	0	–	–	–	–	–	–	0	–	–	–
33	(United Kingdom) (17) Anders Rowe	0	–	–	–	–	–	–	–	0	–	–
34	(United Kingdom) (18) Jason Edwards	0	–	–	–	–	–	–	–	0	–	–
35	(Czech Republic) (201) Jan Kvěch	0	–	–	–	–	–	–	–	–	0	–
Pos.	Rider	Points	CRO (Croatia)	POL (Poland)	CZE (Czech Republic)	GER (Germany)	PL2 (Poland)	SWE (Sweden)	LAT (Latvia)	GBR (United Kingdom)	DEN (Denmark)	PL3 (Poland)

== See also ==
- 2023 Individual Long Track World Championship
- 2023 Speedway World Cup
