= 2023 Speedway Grand Prix of Denmark =

Speedway Grand Prix event

- Venue: Vojens Speedway Center
- Location: Vojens (Denmark)
- Start date: 16 September 2023
- Competitors: 16 (2 reserves)

The 2023 FIM Speedway Grand Prix of Denmark was the ninth round of the 2023 Speedway Grand Prix season (the World Championship of speedway). It took place on 16 September at the Vojens Speedway Center in Vojens, Denmark. It was the 28th Speedway Grand Prix of Denmark.

The event was won by Leon Madsen (his fourth career Grand Prix win).

Defending champion Bartosz Zmarzlik was disqualified during qualifying after wearing leathers which did not conform with FIM regulations.

== Grand Prix result ==
Placing	Rider	1	2	3	4	5	6	7	8	9	10	11	12	13	14	15	16	17	18	19	20	Pts	SF1	SF2	Final	GP Pts
1	(Denmark) (4) Leon Madsen	3							2				3				2				0	10		2	3	20
2	(Sweden) (13) Freddie Lindgren				2	2							1		3					3		11	3		2	18
3	(Australia) (8) Jack Holder		3						3			1			2			3				12		3	1	16
4	(United Kingdom) (14) Robert Lambert				3		2					2		3							3	13	2		0	14
5	(United Kingdom) (9) Dan Bewley			2		3						3					0		3			11		1		12
6	(Denmark) (10) Mikkel Michelsen			3			3						0			2		2				10	1			11
7	(Denmark) (7) Mads Hansen		1					3					2	2					2			10	0			10
8	(Australia) (16) Max Fricke				1				0	3						3			0			7		0		9
9	(Slovakia) (2) Martin Vaculík	2					0				3				1				0			6				8
10	(Sweden) (12) Kim Nilsson			1					1		1			1						2		6				7
11	(Denmark) (6) Rasmus Jensen		0				1			x							3			1		5				6
12	(Germany) (1) Kai Huckenbeck	1				1				2				0				1				5				5
13	(Poland) (11) Patryk Dudek			0				0		1					0						2	3				4
14	(Latvia) (15) Andžejs Ļebedevs				0			2			x						1	0				3				3
15	(Australia) (5) Jason Doyle		2			x					ns					ns					ns	2				2
16	(Poland) (3) Bartosz Zmarzlik	ns						ns				ns				ns				ns		0				0
R1	(Czech Republic) (R1) Jan Kvěch	0						1				0				1				0		2	R1			
R2	(Denmark) (R2) Benjamin Basso										2					0					1	3	R2			

m - exclusion for exceeding two minute time allowance • t - exclusion for touching the tapes • x - other exclusion • e - retired or mechanical failure • f - fell • ns - non-starter • nc - non-classify

gate A - inside	gate B	gate C	gate D - outside
