= 2023 Speedway Grand Prix of Croatia =

Speedway Grand Prix event

- Venue: Stadium Milenium
- Location: Donji Kraljevec (Goričan)
- Start date: 29 April 2023
- Competitors: 16 (2 reserves)

The 2023 FIM Speedway Grand Prix of Croatia was the first race of the 2023 Speedway Grand Prix season (the World Championship of speedway). It took place on 29 April at the Stadium Milenium in Donji Kraljevec, Croatia. It was the fifth Speedway Grand Prix of Croatia.

The event was won by defending world champion Bartosz Zmarzlik (his 19th career Grand Prix win).

== Grand Prix result ==
Placing	Rider	1	2	3	4	5	6	7	8	9	10	11	12	13	14	15	16	17	18	19	20	Pts	SF1	SF2	Final	GP Pts
1	(Poland) (5) Bartosz Zmarzlik		3			t					2					3					2	10		3	3	20
2	(United Kingdom) (11) Robert Lambert			3				3		2					3						0	11	2		2	18
3	(Sweden) (10) Freddie Lindgren			0			1						2			2		3				8		2	1	16
4	(Australia) (16) Jason Doyle				1				3	3						0			3			10	3		0	14
5	(United Kingdom) (13) Tai Woffinden				2	3							3		2					1		11		1		12
6	(Denmark) (12) Mikkel Michelsen			2					2		3			0						2		9	1			11
7	(United Kingdom) (14) Dan Bewley				3		3					0		1							3	10		0		10
8	(Slovakia) (1) Martin Vaculík	3				1				0				3				1				8	0			9
9	(Australia) (6) Jack Holder		0				2			1							2			3		8				8
10	(Australia) (8) Max Fricke		2						1			3			0			2				8				7
11	(Poland) (9) Patryk Dudek			1		2						2					0		2			7				6
12	(Denmark) (15) Anders Thomsen				e			1			1						3	e				5				5
13	(Denmark) (3) Leon Madsen	0						2				1				1				0		4				4
14	(Poland) (2) Maciej Janowski	2					0				0				1				1			4				3
15	(Sweden) (4) Kim Nilsson	1							0				1				1				1	4				2
16	(Slovenia) (7) Matej Žagar		1					0					0	2					0			3				1
R1	(Slovenia) (R1) Nick Škorja (res)					0																0	R1			
R2	(Hungary) (R2) Norbert Magosi (res)																					0	R2			

m - exclusion for exceeding two minute time allowance • t - exclusion for touching the tapes • x - other exclusion • e - retired or mechanical failure • f - fell • ns - non-starter • nc - non-classify

gate A - inside	gate B	gate C	gate D - outside
