= 2023 Speedway Grand Prix of Czech Republic =

Speedway Grand Prix event

- Venue: Markéta Stadium
- Location: Prague (Czech Republic)
- Start date: 3 June 2023
- Competitors: 16 (2 reserves)

The 2023 FIM Speedway Grand Prix of Czech Republic was the third race of the 2023 Speedway Grand Prix season. It took place on 3 June at the Markéta Stadium in Prague, Czech Republic. It was the 29th Speedway Grand Prix of Czech Republic.

The event was won by Martin Vaculík for the second consecutive year.

== Grand Prix result ==
Placing	Rider	1	2	3	4	5	6	7	8	9	10	11	12	13	14	15	16	17	18	19	20	Pts	SF1	SF2	Final	GP Pts
1	(Slovakia) (5) Martin Vaculík		2			1					2					1					3	9	3		3	20
2	(Denmark) (16) Leon Madsen				2				2	3						3			0			10		3	2	18
3	(Australia) (13) Jack Holder				1	2							1		3					3		10	2		1	16
4	(Poland) (9) Bartosz Zmarzlik			1		3						3					1		3			11		2	0	14
5	(United Kingdom) (12) Dan Bewley			2					3		3			3						2		13	1			12
6	(Sweden) (7) Freddie Lindgren		1					3					3	1					1			9		1		11
7	(Poland) (8) Patryk Dudek		3						1			2			1			2				9	0			10
8	(United Kingdom) (6) Robert Lambert		0				3			2							3			0		8		0		9
9	(Australia) (15) Jason Doyle				0			2			1						2	3				8				8
10	(Poland) (10) Maciej Janowski			3			2						0			1		2				8				7
11	(Australia) (14) Max Fricke				3		1					1		2							1	8				6
12	(Denmark) (2) Mikkel Michelsen	2					0				0				2				2			6				5
13	(Denmark) (4) Anders Thomsen	1							0				2				0				2	5				4
14	(United Kingdom) (1) Tai Woffinden	3				0				1				0				f				4				3
15	(Sweden) (11) Kim Nilsson			0				1		0					0						0	1				2
16	(Czech Republic) (3) Václav Milík Jr.	0						0				0				0				1		1				1
R1	(Czech Republic) (R1) Jan Kvěch																					0	R1			
R2	(Czech Republic) (R2) Eduard Krčmář																					0	R2			

m - exclusion for exceeding two minute time allowance • t - exclusion for touching the tapes • x - other exclusion • e - retired or mechanical failure • f - fell • ns - non-starter • nc - non-classify

gate A - inside	gate B	gate C	gate D - outside
