= 2023 Speedway Grand Prix of Latvia =

Speedway Grand Prix event

- Venue: Biķernieki Speedway Stadium
- Location: Riga (Latvia)
- Start date: 12 August 2023
- Competitors: 16 (2 reserves)

The 2023 FIM Speedway Grand Prix of Latvia was the seventh round of the 2023 Speedway Grand Prix season. It took place on 12 August at the Biķernieki Speedway Stadium in Riga, Latvia. It was the 9th Speedway Grand Prix of Latvia but the first time it was held outside of Daugavpils.

The event was won by defending world champion Bartosz Zmarzlik, which was his 22nd career Grand Prix win equalling Tomasz Gollob's 22 wins and leaving him just one behind Jason Crump's record of 23 wins. Jack Holder missed the event with an injured wrist, which ruled out any chance that he had of winning the 2023 World Championship. Anders Thomsen was thrown over the air fence following a crash and suffered a hand injury. Luckily for Thomsen there was a grass field behind the fence and he escaped a potential life changing injury.

== Grand Prix result ==
Placing	Rider	1	2	3	4	5	6	7	8	9	10	11	12	13	14	15	16	17	18	19	20	Pts	SF1	SF2	Final	GP Pts
1	(Poland) (14) Bartosz Zmarzlik				3		2					0		2							2	9	3		3	20
2	(Sweden) (13) Freddie Lindgren				2	3							2		2					3		12	2		2	18
3	(Slovakia) (15) Martin Vaculík				1			3			1						2	3				10		2	1	16
4	(United Kingdom) (2) Tai Woffinden	1					3				3				1				3			11		3	0	14
5	(Australia) (5) Jason Doyle		3			3					3					0					3	12		1		12
6	(Australia) (9) Max Fricke			2		1						3					3		1			10	1			11
7	(Denmark) (7) Leon Madsen		1					2					3	3					0			9	0			10
8	(United Kingdom) (12) Dan Bewley			3					3		0			1						1		8		0		9
9	(United Kingdom) (16) Robert Lambert				0				1	3						1			2			7				8
10	(Poland) (8) Maciej Janowski		2						0			1			3			1				7				7
11	(Latvia) (4) Andžejs Ļebedevs	3							2				x				1				1	7				6
12	(Denmark) (3) Mikkel Michelsen	0						1				2				2				2		7				5
13	(Poland) (1) Patryk Dudek	2				0				2				0				2				6				4
14	(Sweden) (10) Kim Nilsson			0			1						1			3		0				5				3
15	(Latvia) (11) Francis Gusts			1				x		0					0						0	1				2
16	(Denmark) (6) Anders Thomsen		f				ns			ns							ns			ns		0				0
R1	(Latvia) (R1) Ernest Matjuszonok									1										0		1	R1			
R2	(Latvia) (R2) Ričards Ansviesulis						0										0					0	R2			

m - exclusion for exceeding two minute time allowance • t - exclusion for touching the tapes • x - other exclusion • e - retired or mechanical failure • f - fell • ns - non-starter • nc - non-classify

gate A - inside	gate B	gate C	gate D - outside
