= 2014 Team Speedway Junior World Championship =

Motorcycle racing competition

Seasons
- ← 2013 2015 →

The 2014 Team Speedway Junior World Championship was the tenth FIM Team Under-21 World Championship season. The final took place on 23 August 2014 in Slangerup, Denmark.

Poland won their seventh Team Under-21 World Championship.

== Semi-finals ==
- (Germany) Teterow
- 7 June 2014

National team	Pts
Czech Republic	37+3
Australia	37+2
Great Britain	34
Germany	8

- (Sweden) Motala
- 5 July 2014

National team	Pts
Poland	44
Sweden	39
Russia	37
Finland	4

== Final ==
- (Denmark) Slangerup
- 23 August 2014

Pos.	National team	Pts.
1	Poland	51
2	Denmark	35
3	Sweden	21
4	Czech Republic	16

== Scores ==
(Poland)	POLAND	51
No	Rider Name	Pts.	Heats
1	Paweł Przedpełski	14	3,3,3,2,3
2	Piotr Pawlicki Jr.	14	3,3,3,2,3
3	Bartosz Zmarzlik	13	2,3,3,2,3
4	Kacper Gomólski	10	3,2,3,2,0

(Denmark)	DENMARK	35
No	Rider Name	Pts.	Heats
1	Mikkel Michelsen	12	2,3,1,3,3
2	Anders Thomsen	8	1,2,2,1,2
3	Lasse Bjerre	8	ex,2,2,3,1
4	Mikkel Bech Jensen	7	fx,4,2,1,fx

(Sweden)	SWEDEN	21
No	Rider Name	Pts.	Heats
1	Oliver Berntzon	10	1,1,2,2,3,1
2	Jacob Thorssell	5	0,1,1,0,1,2
3	Fredrik Engman	4	0,1,1,2
4	Victor Palovaara	2	2,fx,0,0

(Czech Republic)	CZECH REPUBLIC	16
No	Rider Name	Pts.	Heats
1	Václav Milík Jr.	7	2,r,0,1,3,1
2	Eduard Krčmář	4	3,0,0,r,1,0
3	Zdeněk Holub	4	1,1,0,2
4	Michal Škurla	1	1,0,0,0

== See also ==
- 2014 Speedway World Cup
- 2014 Individual Speedway Junior World Championship
