= Thomas Krüger (politician, born 1969) =

German politician (born 1969)

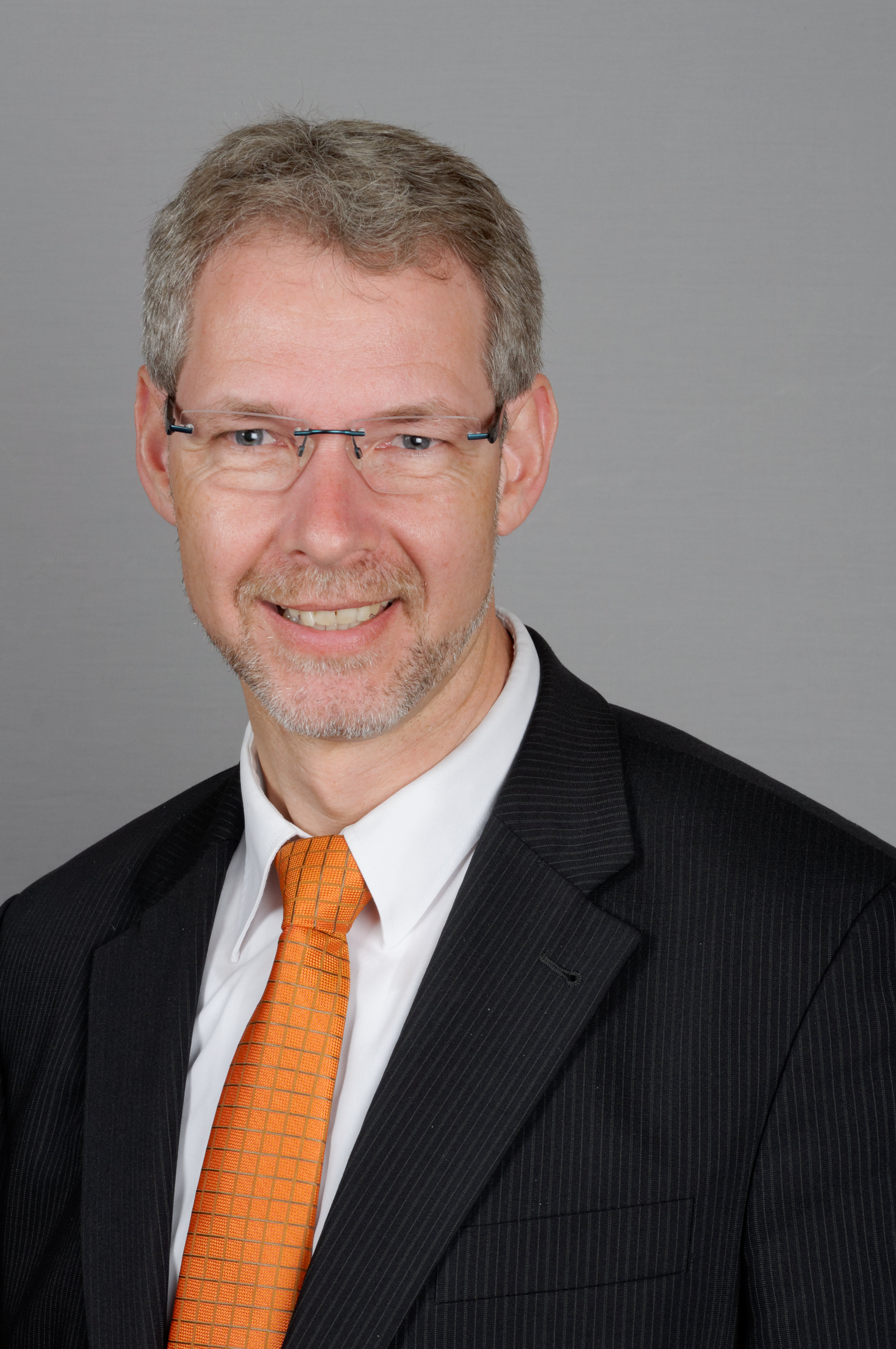
- Krüger in 2017

Member of the Landtag of Mecklenburg-Vorpommern
- Incumbent
- Assumed office 4 October 2011
- Preceded by: Marc Reinhardt
- Constituency: Mecklenburgische Seenplatte II

Personal details
- Born: 11 January 1969 (age 57) Demmin
- Party: Social Democratic Party (since 1989)

Thomas Krüger (born 11 January 1969 in Demmin) is a German politician serving as a member of the Landtag of Mecklenburg-Vorpommern since 2011. From 2016 to 2021, he served as group leader of the Social Democratic Party.
