= 2014 Speedway Under-21 World Championship =

World motorcycle speedway event

World Under-21 Championship
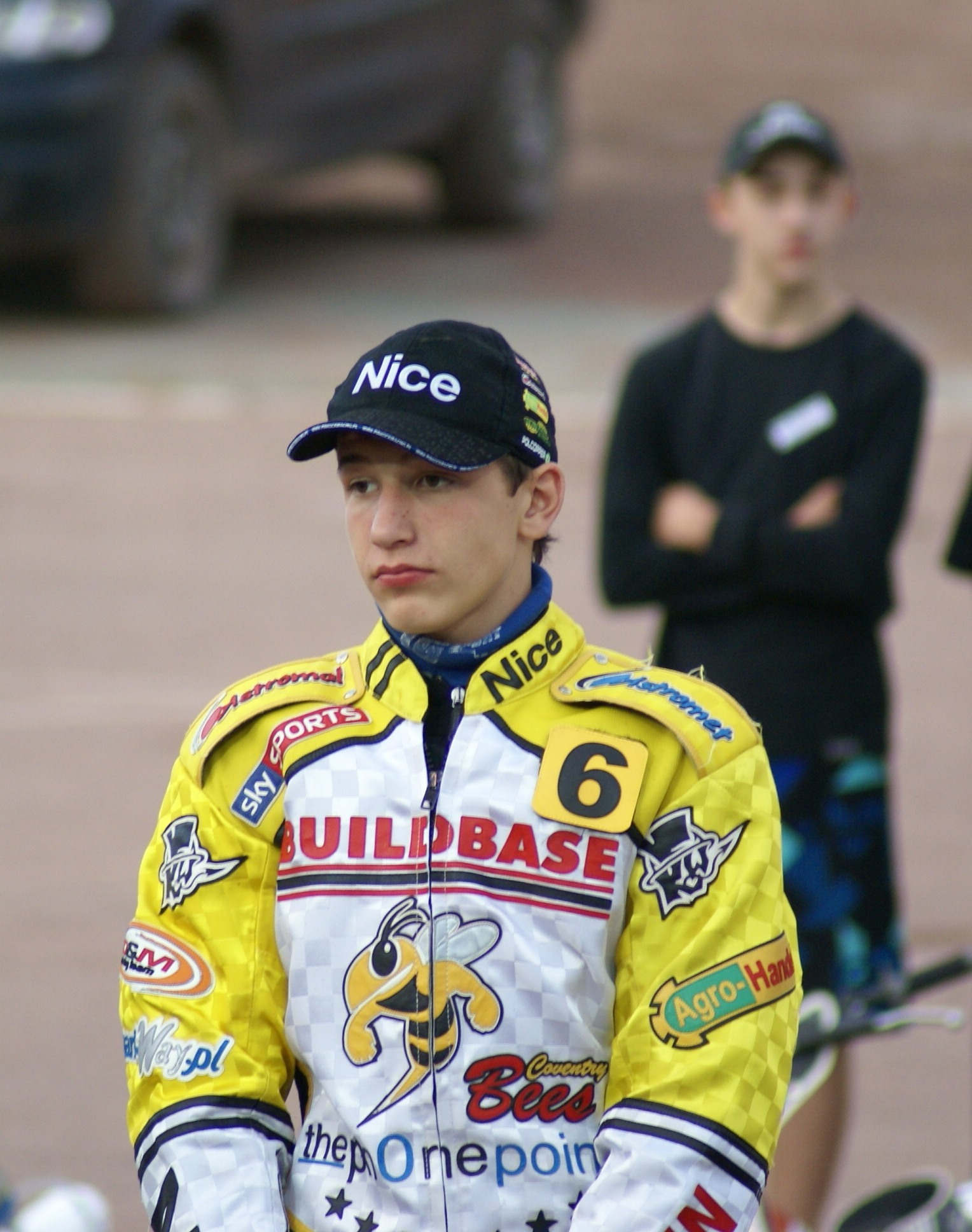
- Piotr Pawlicki

The 2014 Individual Speedway Junior World Championship was the 38th edition of the FIM World motorcycle speedway Under-21 Championships.

Like 2013, the competition took place over three rounds, which were staged in July, August, and October. Piotr Pawlicki Jr. took the title, the third Polish rider to do so in just four years.

== Final Series ==
#	Date	Venue	Winners	Runner-up	3rd place
1	19 July	(Italy) Santa Marina Stadium, Lonigo	(Poland) Piotr Pawlicki Jr.	(Czech Republic) Václav Milík, Jr.	(Denmark) Mikkel Michelsen
2	16 August	(Poland) Municipal Stadium, Ostrów	(Poland) Piotr Pawlicki Jr.	(Poland) Kacper Gomólski	(Poland) Szymon Woźniak
3	4 October	(Czech Republic) Svítkov Stadium, Pardubice	(Poland) Kacper Gomólski	(Denmark) Mikkel Michelsen	(Poland) Piotr Pawlicki Jr.

== Classification ==
The meeting classification was according to the points scored during the meeting (heats 1–20). The total points scored by each rider during each final meeting (heat 1–20) were credited also as World Championship points. The FIM Speedway Under 21 World Champion was the rider having collected most World Championship points at the end of the series. In case of a tie between one or more riders in the final overall classification, a run-off will decide the 1st, 2nd and 3rd place. For all other placings, the better-placed rider in the last final meeting will be the better placed rider.

Pos.	Rider	Points	(Italy)	(Poland)	(Czech Republic)
Gold	(Poland) Piotr Pawlicki Jr.	42	15	15	12
Silver	(Poland) Kacper Gomólski	36	10	13	13
Bronze	(Denmark) Mikkel Michelsen	33	11	10	12
4	(Czech Republic) Václav Milík, Jr.	31	13	10	8
5	(Denmark) Nicklas Porsing	28	7	10	11
6	(Sweden) Jacob Thorssell	26	9	7	10
7	(Poland) Krystian Pieszczek	26	9	8	9
8	(Denmark) Lasse Bjerre	24	8	8	8
9	(Poland) Szymon Woźniak	21	7	12	2
10	(Denmark) Mikkel Bech Jensen	18	10	1	7
11	(France) David Bellego	17	2	8	7
12	(Sweden) Fredrik Engman	17	5	4	8
13	(Denmark) Nikolaj Busk Jakobsen	12	3	3	6
14	(Denmark) Jonas Andersen	9	4	4	1
15	(Poland) Łukasz Sówka	7	–	7	–
16	(Czech Republic) Eduard Krčmář	6	–	–	6
17	(Italy) Nicolas Vicentin	3	3	–	–
18	(United States) Gino Manzares	3	3	0	0
19	(Czech Republic) Zdeněk Holub	0	–	–	0

== See also ==
- 2014 Speedway Grand Prix
- 2014 Team Speedway Junior World Championship
