= 2023 Speedway Grand Prix of Sweden =

Speedway Grand Prix event

2023 Speedway Grand Prix of Denmark
- Venue: Skrotfrag Arena
- Location: Målilla (Sweden)
- Start date: 15 July 2023
- Competitors: 16 (2 reserves)

The 2023 FIM Speedway Grand Prix of Sweden was the sixth round of the 2023 Speedway Grand Prix season (the World Championship of speedway). It took place on 15 July at the Skrotfrag Arena in Målilla, Sweden. It was the 28th Speedway Grand Prix of Sweden.

The event was won by Dan Bewley (his third career Grand Prix win).

== Grand Prix result ==
Placing	Rider	1	2	3	4	5	6	7	8	9	10	11	12	13	14	15	16	17	18	19	20	Pts	SF1	SF2	Final	GP Pts
1	(United Kingdom) (12) Dan Bewley			3					1		2			1						1		8	2		3	20
2	(Slovakia) (7) Martin Vaculík		3					3					3	2					2			13		2	2	18
3	(Poland) (2) Patryk Dudek	2					3				1				3				1			10		3	1	16
4	(Sweden) (14) Freddie Lindgren				3		1					3		3							3	13	3		0	14
5	(Poland) (9) Bartosz Zmarzlik			f		3						2					3		3			11		1		12
6	(Australia) (3) Max Fricke	3						1				1				3				3		11	1			11
7	(Australia) (11) Jack Holder			2				0		3					2						2	9	0			10
8	(United Kingdom) (6) Robert Lambert		2				2			2							2			0		8		0		9
9	(Latvia) (13) Andžejs Ļebedevs				2	2							2		t					2		8				8
10	(Denmark) (15) Anders Thomsen				x			2			3						0	2				7				7
11	(Sweden) (16) Jacob Thorssell				1				2	1						2			0			6				6
12	(United Kingdom) (4) Tai Woffinden	0							3				1				1				0	5				5
13	(Denmark) (8) Mikkel Michelsen		1						0			0			1			3				5				4
14	(Denmark) (1) Leon Madsen	1				1				0				0				1				3				3
15	(Poland) (5) Maciej Janowski		0			0					0					1					1	2				2
16	(Australia) (10) Jason Doyle			1			0						0			0		0				1				0
R1	(Sweden) (R1) Filip Hjelmland														0							0	R1			
R2	(Sweden) (R2) Casper Henriksson																					0	R2			

m - exclusion for exceeding two minute time allowance • t - exclusion for touching the tapes • x - other exclusion • e - retired or mechanical failure • f - fell • ns - non-starter • nc - non-classify

gate A - inside	gate B	gate C	gate D - outside
