= Nyköpings Motorstadion =

Stadium in Nyköping, Sweden

- Location: Svansta 2, 611 94 Nyköping, Sweden
- Coordinates: 58°46′51″N 17°02′11″E
- Operator: Griparna motorcycle speedway
- Opened: May 1984
- Length: 294 m (0.183 mi)

Nyköpings Motorstadion or Svanstabanan is a motorcycle speedway track located about 4 kilometres north of the centre of Nyköping. The facility is just off the Kocksängsvägen, adjacent to the Nyköpings motorsällskap, which runs Motocross, Enduro, and motorcycle trials.

The stadium hosts the Griparna speedway team that competes in the Swedish Speedway Team Championship and were the 2019 Allsvenskan champions.

== History ==
Construction on a speedway track began in 1980 by the Nyköping Motorsällskap Association, opening in May 1984.

The venue hosted the World Championship Swedish final round during both the 1989 Individual Speedway World Championship and 1989 Individual Speedway World Championship It also hosted the Swedish Individual Speedway Championship in 2014.

The track record is held by Robin Törnqvist in a time of 57.4 seconds.

The stadium was renamed the Truckmountedattenuator (TMA) Bolaget Arena for sponsorship purposes.
