= Horst Klinkmann =

German internist

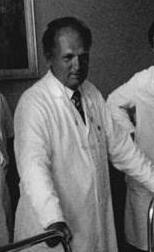
- Klinkmann in 1988
- Born: 7 May 1935 (age 91); Teterow, Mecklenburg, Germany
- Occupations: Physician; University teacher Nephrologist
- Spouse: Hanelore Kruse/Klinkmann
- Children: 1

Horst Klinkmann (born 7 May 1935) is a German professor for Internal medicine and Nephrology (kidney related medicine). A principal focus of his research is in the area of major medical implants. Between 1990 and 1992 he served, in succession to Werner Scheler, as the final president of the (East) German Academy of Sciences.

In 1992 he was relieved of his professorship at Rostock University "on account of personality defects" ("wegen mangelnder persönl. Eignung"). There is a view, to which he himself subscribes, that after 1990 his career suffered from the perception that he had been too close to the political establishment in East Germany.

== Early life ==
Horst Klinkmann was born and grew up in Teterow, a small town near Rostock in northern Germany. His father was killed in the war which broke out when he was 4, and his mother died when he was 10. After this he was taken in by a local orphanage. In 1954 he entered the school of medicine at the University of Rostock, receiving his doctorate in 1959.

Between 1960 and 1966, he continued with higher level medical studies at Rostock's Physiology Institute, also undertaking studies at the Semmelweis University in Budapest, where his interest in kidney function was encouraged by a Professor Bálint, and at the Kidney Clinic in Lund, Sweden. His habilitation followed in 1969.

== Career in East Germany ==
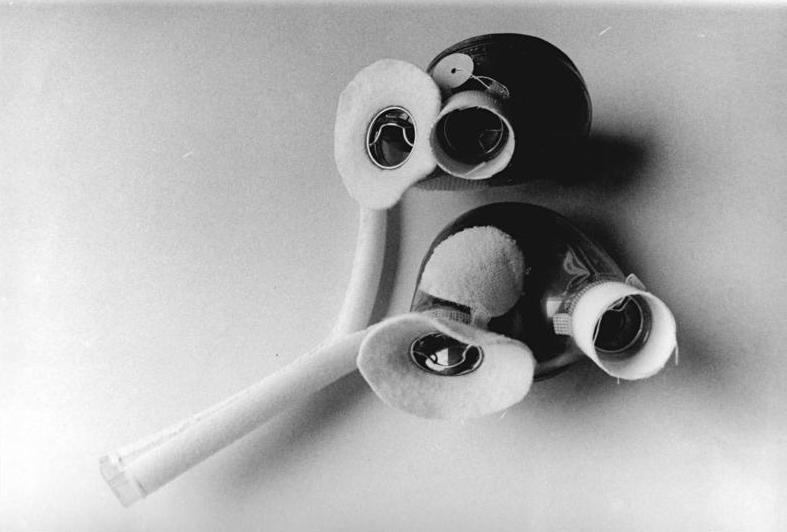
Research project "Künstliches Herz" ("Artificial heart") produced by a research team headed up by Prof. Dr. Horst Klinkmann Jürgen Sindermann, 1988

Between 1969 and 1971 Klinkmann was a visiting research professor at the University of Utah. In 1974 he became Director for Internal Medicine at Rostock University, a position he held for almost twenty years.

In 1982 he was elected a corresponding member of the (East) German Academy of Sciences, becoming a full member in 1986 and, in 1990, the academy's last president.

== East German political activity ==
In 1974, he joined East Germany's ruling Socialist Unity Party (Sozialistische Einheitspartei Deutschlands / SED). Between 1984 and 1989 he served as a member of the party's district leadership team ("Bezirksleitung") in Rostock. He was a chairman of the Scientific Advisory Committee to the East German Health Ministry. Reports also emerged later that during the 1980s he had passed personal information on colleagues to the East German Ministry for State Security (Stasi). Research into the archives indicated that from 1968 he had been identified in Stasi files under the code name "Informal Collaborator Ludwig" ("IM Ludwig"). His evident travel privileges reflected his international eminence, but there are indications that his cultivation of the political establishment was also helpful in this regard. However, the Stasi files also disclose that by the 1980s he was regarded as unreliable by his handlers because he had failed to provide adequate disclosure of private contacts made during his trips abroad, and after 1987 his career as an informant was officially deemed to be over.

== Post-reunification career ==
Following reunification Klinkmann's reputation was tarnished in some quarters by his close association with the political rulers of the discredited East German political regime. He was relieved of his professorship at Rostock University in 1992.

Though damaged, his academic career and reputation survived the criticism and more recently appear to have outlasted many of the critics.

Between 1992 and 1994 Klinkmann worked as Professor for Nephrology at the University of Bologna, where in February 1993 he was appointed Dean of the International Faculty for Artificial Organs. He also served from 1990 till 2002 as a permanent guest professor for Bio-engineering at Glasgow's Strathclyde University where he had been named an honorary graduate in 1988.

== Personal ==
Horst Klinkmann met his future wife, Hannelore Kruse, when they were both medical students at Rostock. Her speciality is in Orthopedics. Both his wife and his son, Jens, are medically qualified.

== Awards and honours ==
Klinkmann's own curriculum vitae refers to more than fifty awards and seventeen honorary memberships of medical organisations around the world, listing a few of them. Reference is also made to his membership of the editorial boards of ten national and international scientific journals.

He won the National Prize of East Germany twice, in 1977 and in 1985. He also was awarded the Patriotic Order of Merit in 1987.

He was appointed a member of the New York Academy of Sciences and of the Royal Belgian Academy of Medical Sciences. In 1988 he became a Fellow of the (London based) Royal College of Physicians. He became president and then an honorary member of the International Society for Artificial Organs (1979–1984) and president of the European Transplant and Dialysis Society and received honorary doctorates from universities in Marseille, Debrecen, Glasgow and Brno.

On 17 June 1985 he was awarded honorary citizenship of his birth town, Teterow on the occasion of its 750th anniversary.
