= Werner Scheler =

German politician and pharmacologist

- Born: 12 September 1923; Coburg, Bavaria, Germany
- Died: 9 October 2018 (aged 95)
- Occupations: Academic (Pharmacology); University rector (Greifswald: 1966–1970); Party Central Committee Member (SED: 1979–1989)
- Political party: NSDAP (1941–1945); KPD (1945–1946); SED (1946–1989)

Werner Scheler (12 September 1923 – 9 October 2018) was a German physician and pharmacologist.

Between 1959 and 1971 he worked at the University of Greifswald where he served as the Director of the university's Institute of Pharmacology and as a teaching professor in his subject, subsequently also becoming the University Rector following the death of Georg Tartler. Later, between 1979 and 1990, Scheler was the penultimate president of the (East) German Academy of Sciences.

Like many leading academics in the German Democratic Republic, Werner Scheler also pursued a career in national politics. At the end of 1978 he was elected to membership of the powerful Party Central Committee.

== Life ==
Scheler was born at the main hospital in Coburg in what was then central southern Germany. His father worked as a locksmith in Steinach, a short distance to the south. Scheler attended primary school in Steinach and secondary school (Realgymnasium) in nearby Sonneberg. During the war, which from a German perspective broke out in 1939, he served in anti-aircraft defence as a "Flak soldier". After the war ended, formally in May 1945, he was finally able, in 1946/47, to study for and pass his school leaving exams in Jena.

In parallel with the completion of his schooling, in 1946 he began to study Medicine at the University of Jena. He received his doctorate in 1951 for a dissertation on the biological effects of Choline. He then moved on to Berlin's Humboldt University where he remained between 1951 and 1959, starting out as a research assistant and progressing to a post as a research scientist. During this time he received his habilitation (a higher academic qualification) in 1956 for research work on Pharmacology and Toxicology.

Scheler took on a teaching professorship at the Humboldt in Pharmacology and Toxicology in 1959. At the same time he worked as the Director of the Institute of Pharmacology at Greifswald University, some 250 km (160 miles) to the north. A teaching professorship at Greifswald followed in 1962. In 1966 he became the Rector at Greifswald after the incumbent died. He held this post till 1970. In 1971 he was appointed Director of the Research Centre for Molecular Biology and Medicine, a newly established branch of the National Academy of Sciences based on the north side of Berlin. From July 1979 till the end of June 1990 he then served as the President of the National Academy of Sciences. The Academy itself was disbanded in the wake of German Reunification, which meant that Werner Scheler was actually its penultimate president. His successor was Horst Klinkmann.

The focus of his research was the functioning of Hemoglobin in Red blood cells. Werner Scheler produced around 350 scientific publications.

== Politics ==
In 1941, which was the year of his eighteenth birthday, Werner Scheler joined the NSDAP (Nazi Party). After the war ended, with Thuringia now administered as part of the Soviet occupation zone in what remained of Germany, he joined the German Communist Party. Following the contentious party merger of April 1946 he was one of thousands of German Communists who lost no time in signing their party membership across to the new Socialist Unity Party (SED), which was in the process of becoming the ruling party under the one-party dictatorship being established ahead of the foundation, formally in October 1949, of the German Democratic Republic. In 1963 he joined the National Cultural Association ("KB" / Kulturbund). The KB was one of the Soviet style formally approved Mass Organisations that were a feature of the country's constitutional arrangements. Although not political parties in the western sense, East Germany's mass organisations each received a fixed quota of seats in the National Legislative Assembly (Volkskammer). It was as a representative of the Cultural Association, and not, formally, as a representative of the Socialist Unity Party that between 1963 and 1967 Werner Scheler sat as a member of the Volkskammer.

As a prominently active party member, Scheler became a member of the SED local leadership at the Academy of Sciences. In 1976, at the eleventh party conference, he was nominated as a candidate for membership of the Party Central Committee. Two years later, at the end of 1978, he was elected one of the 145 full members of the Central Committee. In a political structure that placed emphasis on the "leading role" of the party, expressly set above the Volkskammer and government ministries, and which further identified he Central Committee as the "highest organ" in the party structure except when the annual party conference was in session, Central Committee membership conferred significant political influence. Scheler remained a Central Committee member till the changes at the end of 1989 which heralded the end of one-party dictatorship and less than a year later, in October 1990, of the separate existence of the German Democratic Republic itself. In 1981 he also received a new nomination from the Kulturbund to sit as an organisation representative in the Volkskammer: this position, too, he retained till the East German political structure crumbled in 1989.

== Awards and honours ==
- 1970: National Prize of East Germany
- 1982: Patriotic Order of Merit in gold (implying awards in earlier years of the bronze and silver versions)
- 1983: Order of Karl Marx
- 19XX: Banner of Labor
- 19XX: National Merit Medal
- 1966: Honoured Doctor of the People

Scheler was elected a corresponding member of the (East) German Academy of Sciences in 1971, becoming a full member two years later. Additionally, in 1977 he became a member of the Halle based Academy of Sciences Leopoldina (renamed and reconfigured in 2007/2008 as the "German Academy of Sciences"). Since 1993 he has been a member of the Leibnitz Society of Scientists which in many respects is the successor organisation to the old (East) German Academy of Sciences.

He has also been honoured as an "external member" of several foreign learned societies, including the Czechoslovak and Bulgarian Academies of sciences, and receiving similar endorsements from the Soviet Academies of Sciences and of Medical Sciences.

Werner Scheler has received honorary doctorates from Greifswald and Vilnius Universities.
