= Gottlieb Kirchhoff =

German-born Russian chemist (1764–1833)

Gottlieb Sigismund Kirchhoff
- Born: 19 February 1764; Teterow, Mecklenburg-Schwerin
- Died: 14 February 1833 (aged 68); Saint Petersburg, Russian Empire
- Known for: Hydrolysis of starch into a sugar Refining vegetable oil.
- Scientific career
- Fields: Chemistry

Gottlieb Sigismund Constantin Kirchhoff (Russian: Константин Сигизмундович Кирхгоф, romanized: Konstantin Sigizmundovich Kirhgof; 19 February 1764 – 14 February 1833) was a Russian chemist of German origin.

== Career ==
In 1792–1802, he was Assistant Director and then Director of the Head Pharmacy at Saint Petersburg. Corresponding member (1807–1812) and since 1812 Full member of the Petersburg Academy of Sciences (Russia). In 1811, he became the first person to convert starch into a sugar (corn syrup), by heating it with sulfuric acid in acid-catalyzed reaction. This sugar was eventually named glucose. He also developed a method of refining vegetable oil, and established a factory that prepared two tons of refined oil a day.

Since the sulfuric acid was not consumed, it was the first documented example of catalysis in organic chemistry – a term that Jöns Jacob Berzelius would later coin.
