= Fredrik Engman =

Swedish speedway rider

- Born: 9 January 1994 (age 32); Motala, Sweden
- Nationality: Swedish

Career history

Sweden
- 2012: Rospiggarna
- 2013–2016: Piraterna
- 2013: Örnarna
- 2014–2015: Masarna
- 2016: Västervik

Individual honours
- 2013, 2014, 2015: Swedish U21 champion

Team honours
- 2013: Elitserien champion
- 2014: U21 team World Championship bronze

Fredrik Jimmy Engman (born 9 January 1994) is a former speedway rider from Sweden.

== Speedway career ==
Engman came to prominence in 2013, when he became the Swedish junior champion after winning the Swedish U21 title during the 2013 Swedish speedway season. He then successfully defended the title in 2014 and 2015.

It was in 2013 that Engman also won the Swedish Speedway Team Championship as part of the Piraterna team and reached the final of the 2013 Individual Speedway Junior European Championship.

Engman was a member of the Sweden national under-21 speedway team that won the bronze medal at the 2014 Team Speedway Junior World Championship. He also reached the final of the 2014 Speedway Under-21 World Championship.

In 2015, Engman competed in the 2015 Speedway European Championship but retired from speedway in 2016.
