= René Lange =

German footballer (born 1988)

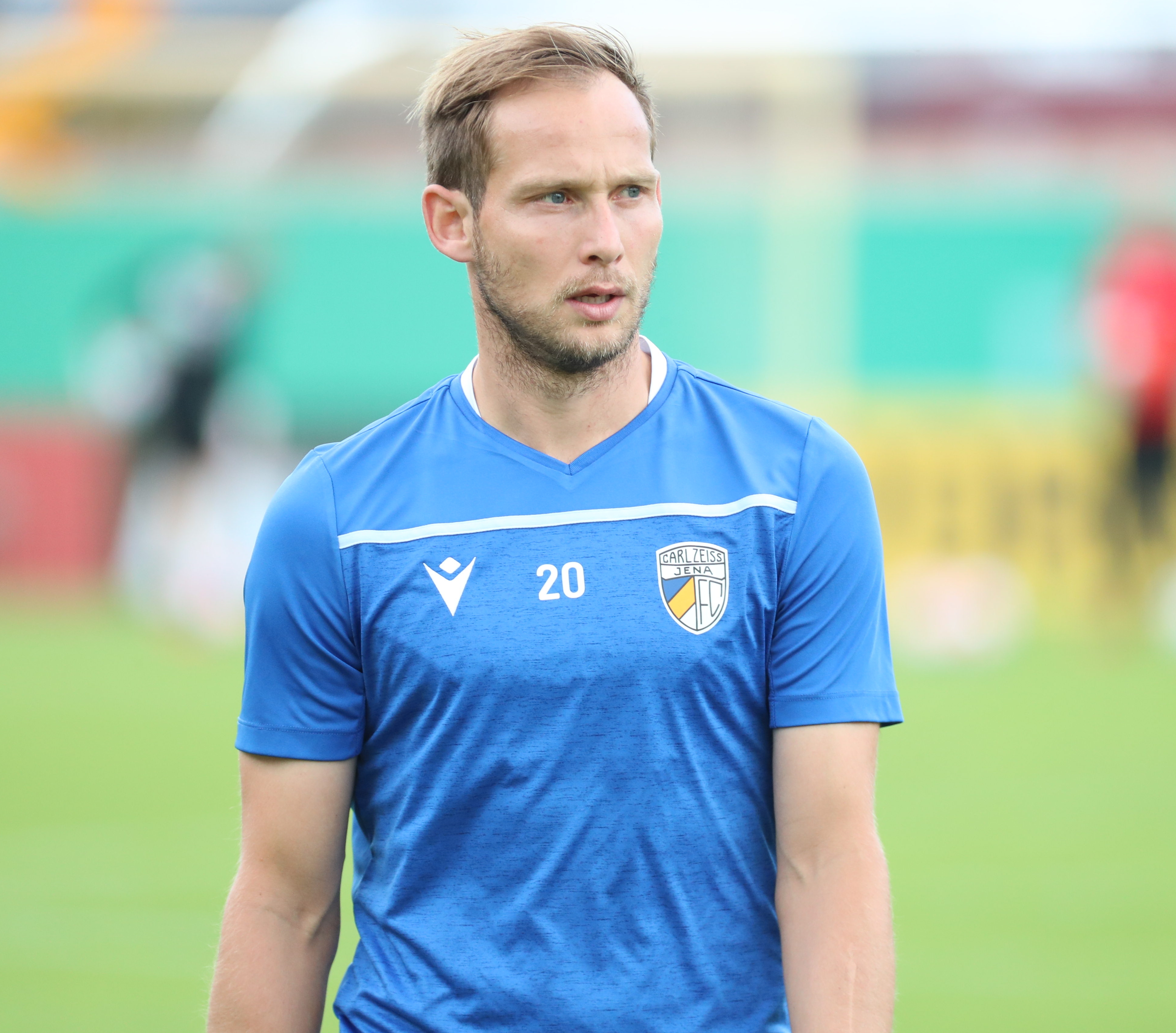

Personal information
- Date of birth: 22 November 1988 (age 37)
- Place of birth: Teterow, East Germany
- Height: 1.80 m (5 ft 11 in)
- Positions: Defender; midfielder

Team information
- Current team: FC Carl Zeiss Jena (assistant coach)

Youth career
- 1994–2000: Gnoiener SV
- 2000–2003: FC Tollense Neubrandenburg
- 2003–2009: Hansa Rostock

Senior career*
Years	Team	Apps	(Gls)
2007–2012	Hansa Rostock II	123	(5)
2009–2011	Hansa Rostock	6	(0)
2013–2015	1. FC Magdeburg	41	(2)
2015–2020	FSV Zwickau	145	(7)
2020–2023	FC Carl Zeiss Jena	60	(3)

Managerial career
- 2023: FC Carl Zeiss Jena (assistant)
- 2024: Greifswalder FC (assistant)
- 2025–: FC Carl Zeiss Jena (assistant)
- * Club domestic league appearances and goals

René Lange (born 22 November 1989) is a German professional football coach and a former player who is an assistant coach with FC Carl Zeiss Jena. He played as a defender or midfielder.

== Career ==
Lange was born in Teterow, East Germany.

=== Hansa Rostock ===
In July 2009, Lange signed a professional contract with the club. He made his competitive debut for the senior team on 27 September 2009 in a 4–0 home victory over Greuther Fürth. He was subbed on for Fin Bartels in the 80th minute.

=== 1. FC Magdeburg ===
In July 2013, Lange moved to then Regionalliga club 1. FC Magdeburg on a two-year deal. He made his competitive debut for the club on 3 August 2013 in a 1–0 home defeat to Energie Cottbus in the DFB-Pokal. Just eight days later, he made his first league appearance for the club in a 3–1 away defeat to Berliner AK 07. He scored his first competitive goal for the club on 23 March 2014 in a 6–0 home victory over Optik Rathenow. His goal, scored in the 65th minute, made the score 5–0 to Magdeburg.

=== FSV Zwickau ===
In July 2015, Lange joined FSV Zwickau on a free transfer. He made his competitive debut for the club on 24 July 2015 in a 3–0 away victory over Berliner FC Dynamo. He scored his first competitive goal for the club on 20 September 2015 in a 3–2 home victory over TSG Neustrelitz. His goal, scored in the 48th minute, made the score 1–0 to Zwickau. During Zwickau's match against Energie Cottbus on 6 October 2018, Lange tore a muscle in his adductor region, ruling him out for six weeks. On 12 October 2018, Lange signed a two-year contract extension with the club.
