= Marc Reinhardt =

German politician (born 1978)

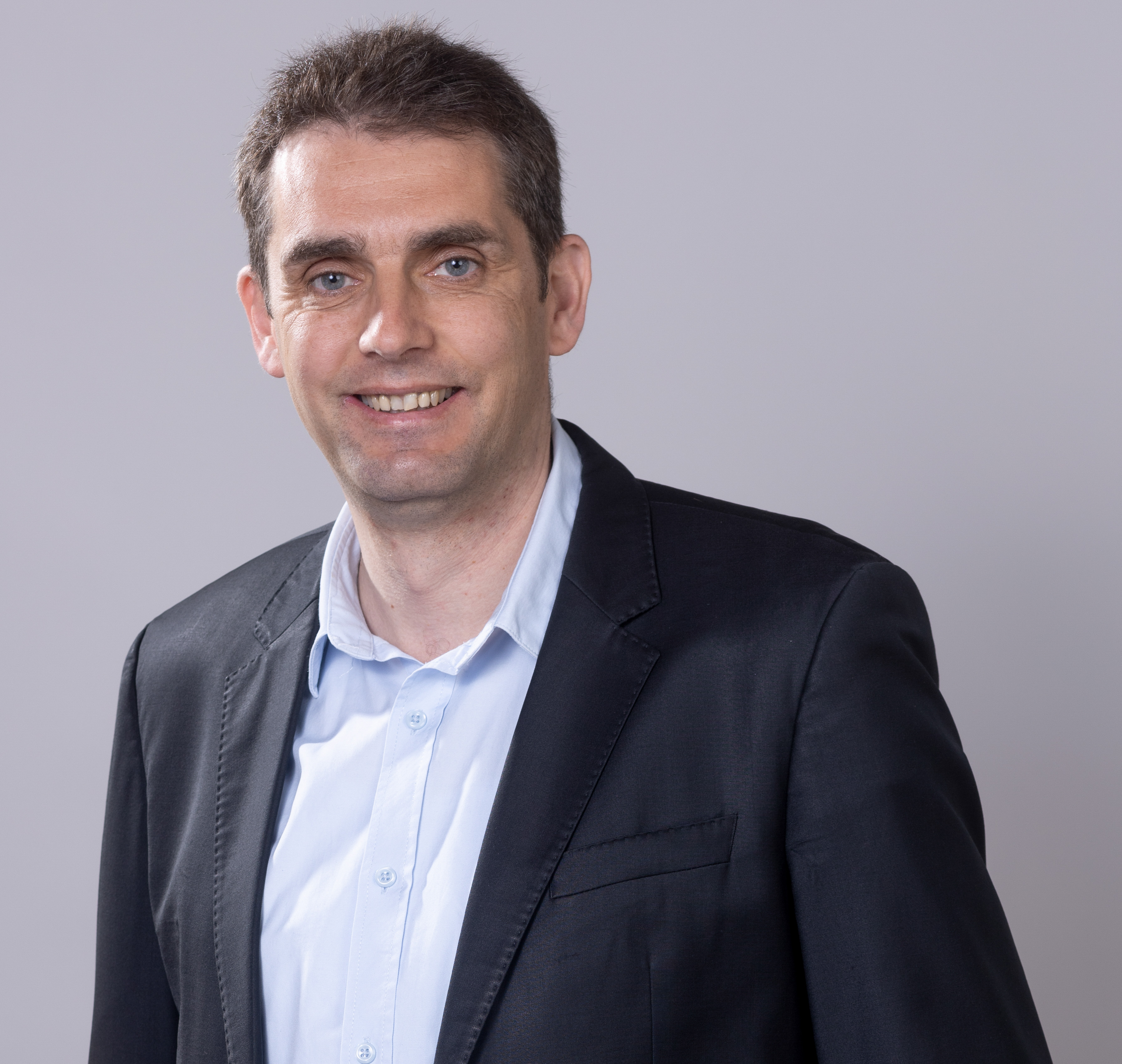
- Reinhardt in 2021

Member of the Landtag of Mecklenburg-Vorpommern
- Incumbent
- Assumed office 16 October 2006
- Preceded by: Martin Brick
- Constituency: Mecklenburgische Seenplatte II (2006–2011)

Personal details
- Born: 4 February 1978 (age 48) Teterow
- Party: Christian Democratic Union (since 1999)

Marc Reinhardt (born 4 February 1978 in Teterow) is a German politician serving as a member of the Landtag of Mecklenburg-Vorpommern since 2006. He has served as deputy leader of the Christian Democratic Union in Mecklenburg-Vorpommern since 2022.
