= Teterow =

Town in Mecklenburg-Vorpommern, Germany

- Town
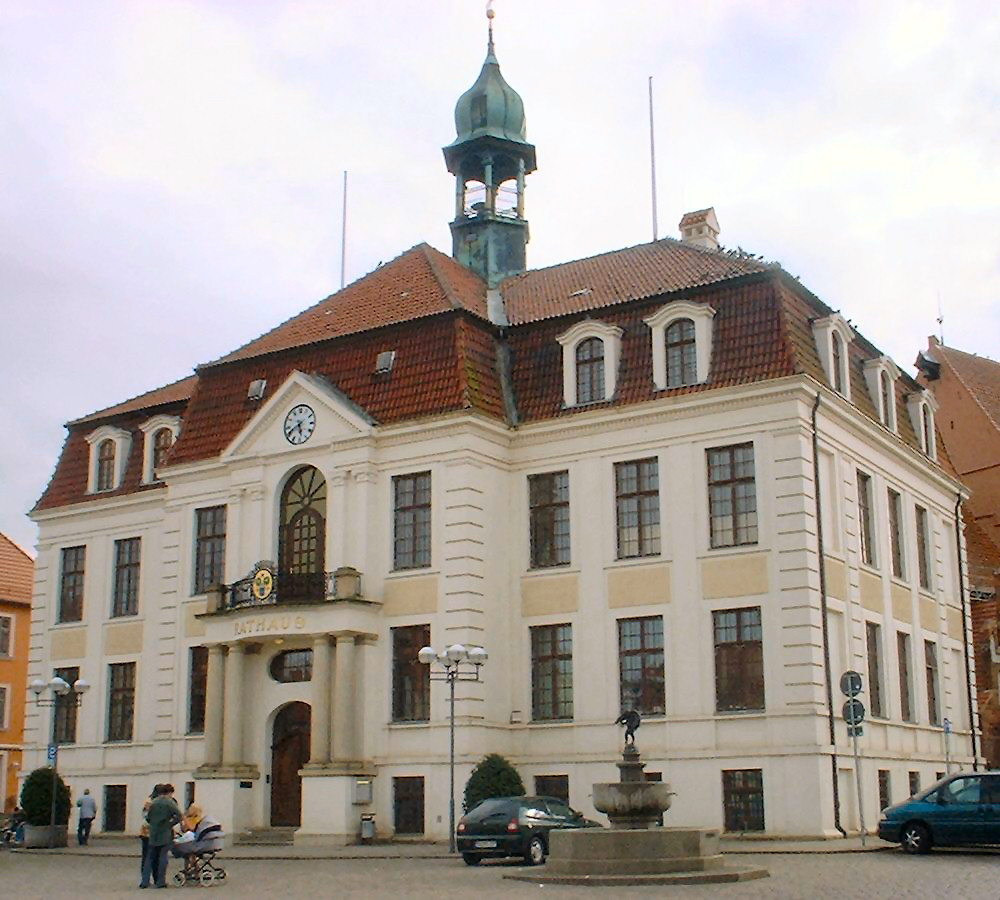
- Neo-Baroque town hall of Teterow (1910)

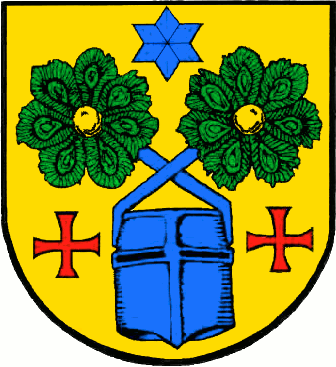
- Flag Coat of arms

- Location of Teterow within Rostock district
- Interactive map of Teterow
- Location within Germany Location within Mecklenburg-Vorpommern
- Coordinates: 53°46′N 12°34′E
- Country: Germany
- State: Mecklenburg-Vorpommern
- District: Rostock

Government
  - Mayor: Andreas Lange

Area
  - Total: 47.07 km^{2} (18.17 sq mi)
- Elevation: 10 m (33 ft)

Population (2025-12-31)
  - Total: 8,262
  - Density: 175.5/km^{2} (454.6/sq mi)
- Time zone: UTC+01:00 (CET)
  - Summer (DST): UTC+02:00 (CEST)
- Postal codes: 17166
- Dialling codes: 03996
- Vehicle registration: LRO, TET, GÜ
- Website: www.teterow.de

Teterow (German: [ˈteːtəʁoː]) is a town of Germany, in the district of Rostock, in Mecklenburg-Western Pomerania. It is the geographical center of this federal state. It had a population of 8,852 in 2011.

== History ==
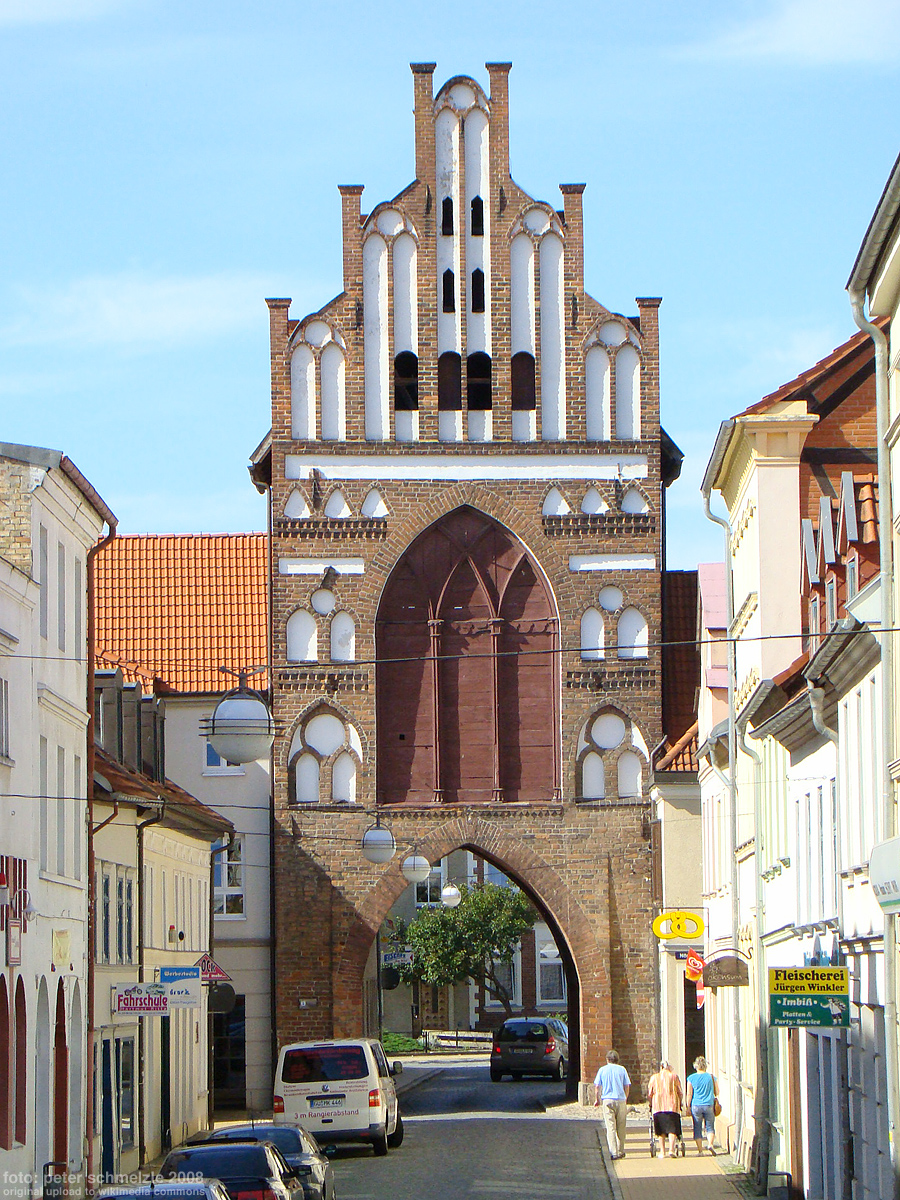
Rostocker Tor (Brick Gothic city gate leading to Rostock)

The Stadtkirche St. Peter und Paul (St. Peter and St. Paul's Church), was built in 1215 in Late Romanesque and Gothic style.

There are two remaining gates of the ancient city wall: the 14th-century Malchiner Tor (today the seat of the museum of local history), and the Rostocker Tor.

The Marktplatz (Market Square), with the Town Hall, was built in 1910 in Neo-Baroque style.

The "Hechtbrunen" with inscription in "Plattdütsch" (Northgerman dialect). Weck Lüd sünd klauk un weck sünd däsig, un weck dei sünd wat öwernäsig. Lat't ehr spijöken, kinnings lat't, dei Klock hett lürr't, dei Hekt is fat't.

== Culture ==
Thusch - - Theater in der Uhrenschule (Theatre at the Clock factory). A Studio theatre and cinema, existing since 2002. Member of the Landesverbandes Filmkommunikation Mecklenburg-Vorpommern, the umbrella organisation of art house cinema and film clubs.

== Twin Towns ==
Teterow is twinned with:

- Bad Segeberg, Germany, since 1990
- Scheeßel, Germany, since 1990
- Białogard, Poland, since 1993
- Kunszentmárton, Hungary, since 1993
- Šiauliai, Lithuania, since 1999
- Sjöbo, Sweden, since 2008

== Notable people ==
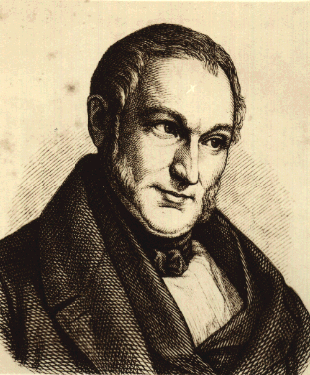
Johann Heinrich von Thünen

- Gottlieb Kirchhoff (1764–1833), a Russian chemist of German origin; converted starch into a sugar
- Johann Heinrich von Thünen (1783–1850), prominent economist, influential in the field of Economic geography, died locally.
- Fredrick W. Muller (1848/9-1925), immigrated to the United States in 1872 to Arlington Heights, IL and ran a successful Soda Pop Company Arlington Club Soda with his two sons William and Henry.
- Herta Bothe (1921-2000), Nazi concentration camp guard, war criminal
- Hans G. Helms (1932–2012), experimental writer, composer, social and economic analyst and critic
- Horst Klinkmann (born 1935), professor of Internal medicine and nephrology
- Ulrich Adam (born 1950), politician (CDU), member of the German Bundestag from 1990 to 2009, holder of the Federal Cross of Merit
- Jeannine Rösler (born 1970), German politician
- Marc Reinhardt (born 1978), German politician
- Marcel Gleffe (born 1979), "Saviour of Utøya", saved the lives of 20 people during the 2011 Utøya massacre in Norway

=== Sport ===
- Gerd Kische (born 1951), footballer, played 563 games for FC Hansa Rostock and 28 for East Germany
- Jana Schmidt (born 1972), a Paralympian athlete, bronze medallist at the 2012 Summer Paralympics
- René Lange (born 1988), footballer, played over 300 games
