= Smederna =

Motorcycle speedway club based in Eskilstuna, Sweden

Club information
- Track address: Eskilstuna motorstadion Tommy Janssons väg Eskilstuna
- Country: Sweden
- Founded: 1951
- Team manager: Jerker Eriksson
- League: Elitserien
- Website: Official website

Club facts
- Colours: Red, Black and White
- Nickname: The Blacksmiths
- Track size: 335 metres
- Track record time: 56.8
- Track record date: 2022
- Track record holder: Dan Bewley

Major team honours
League champions	1973, 1977, 2017, 2018, 2019, 2022
Second Division Champions	1989, 1992
Pairs champions	1972

Smederna is a motorcycle speedway club based in Eskilstuna, Sweden. The club competes in the highest speedway league in Sweden called the Elitserien and race its home matches at Eskilstuna motorstadion outside Eskilstuna. Smederna has won six Swedish Speedway Team Championships.

== Venues ==
=== Snälltorpet ===
The team raced at Snälltorpet from the 1953 season until the 2001 season, when the land was sold by Eskilstuna Municipality. The track was also used for 1976 Swedish final, the 1976 Speedway World Pairs Championship and the intercontinental final of the 1979 Speedway World Team Cup.

=== Eskilstuna motorstadion ===
Since 2002, the team have raced at the Eskilstuna motorstadion.

== History ==
In 1948 the speedway team Griparna (English: the Griffins) started to race in the Swedish leagues. The team was co-run by motorcycle sport clubs SMK Södermanland, Nyköpings MS and Eskilstuna MK and was based in Nyköping, however some of their home matches took place in Eskilstuna. In 1951 the team changed name to Smederna (English: the Blacksmiths) in relation to the city's steel making background and started to race all home matches in Eskilstuna. Until 1953 the home track had been Tunavallens B-plan which was not an actual speedway arena. But that year Smederna moved to the new speedway arena Snälltorpet. But Smederna would only race at Snälltorpet for a few years before closing the team down in 1955. The team regularly visited England (the strongest speedway league in the world at the time) to take on teams in challenge matches.

After eight years SMK Södermanland decided to take up speedway again and in 1963 Smederna started in the third and lowest division in Swedish speedway. In 1967, the club advanced to the second division and in 1971 to the first and highest division. In the seventies Smederna would have its first and biggest time of glory with a couple of team championship medals. In 1973 Smederna managed to win the club's first championship and in the following three years the team was participating in the medal fight with a silver medal in 1975 as highest result. In the spring of 1976 Smederna and the whole town of Eskilstuna was hit by a big tragedy when local superstar Tommy Jansson crashed to death in a world championships qualification at Gubbängens IP, Stockholm. It was a big blow for the speedway sport in the city and there was a big decrease in the attendance figures. In spite of the tragedy Smederna continued to be one of Sweden's best speedway clubs for a couple of years with the gold medal in 1977 as best result.

In the eighties the interest for speedway decreased in Eskilstuna as well as in Sweden. Smederna had some internal problems in the beginning of the decade ending up with the club splitting up in two separate clubs, Smederna and Tuna Rebels. Smederna struggled to keep its place in the highest division (since 1982 called Elitserien) and was relegated to the second division in 1985 to 1986, gaining promotion in 1987 before further spells in the second division from 1988 to 1989 and 1992.

In 1993 Smederna had once again advanced to Elitserien and this time the team finished on second place which was the best result in ten years. Smederna now managed to maintain their place in the upper tier for 17 consecutive seasons. In 2002 the club moved to a new home track, Smedstadion, outside of Eskilstuna and in the first season Smederna had problems to make advantage of the new track but already in the following season Smederna won all but one of their home matches. The loss came in the Swedish team championship final against Kaparna. Smederna had to once again settle for a silver medal.

In the recent years Smederna has struggled with financial problems which forced the club to downsize the squad and release a few top riders like Nicki Pedersen, Billy Hamill and Scott Nicholls. In the fall of 2008 Smederna decided to sell the team name to Swedish company Ikaros. As it turned out, this sponsorship deal was not enough to save the club. In July 2009 the club went bankrupt and immediately withdrew from the Elitserien league. The following year the team made a restart in the league system by entering the third tier known as Division 1, still under the name of Ikaros Smederna, and won the league quite easy. For the next two years the club raced in the Allsvenskan league and in the season of 2013 Ikaros Smederna made a return to the Swedish top tier, only four years after the bankruptcy.

The club returned to significant success when they won the league title three years running from 2017 to 2019 and again in 2022.

== Honours ==
=== Swedish team championships ===
- Gold: 6 (1973, 1977, 2017, 2018, 2019, 2022)
- Silver: 6 (1951, 1952, 1975, 1993, 2003, 2021)
- Bronze: 4 (1953, 1972, 1978, 1982)

== Previous teams ==
Extended content

2015 Team

- (Russia) Grigory Laguta
- (Sweden) Magnus Zetterström
- (Poland) Paweł Przedpełski
- (Denmark) Kenni Larsen
- (Poland) Przemyslaw Pawlicki
- (Sweden) Peter Karlsson
- (Denmark) Mikkel Michelsen
- (Sweden) Johannes Stark
- (Sweden) Alexander Edberg
- (Sweden) Daniel Henderson

Guest Riders

- (Sweden) Linus Eklöf
- (Sweden) Rasmus Broberg

2017 Team

- (Sweden) Pontus Aspgren
- (Poland) Krzysztof Buczkowski
- (Sweden) Linus Eklöf
- (Latvia) Andžejs Ļebedevs
- (Denmark) Michael Jepsen Jensen
- (Denmark) Leon Madsen
- (Denmark) Mikkel Michelsen
- (Slovenia) Matej Žagar

2018 team

- (Sweden) Pontus Aspgren
- (Poland) Krzysztof Buczkowski
- (Sweden) Linus Eklöf
- (Latvia) Andžejs Ļebedevs
- (Sweden) Fredrik Lindgren
- (Denmark) Michael Jepsen Jensen
- (Denmark) Niels Kristian Iversen
- (Denmark) Mikkel Michelsen
- (Sweden) Alexander Woentin

2019 Team

- (Sweden) Pontus Aspgren
- (Russia) Gleb Chugunov
- (Sweden) Linus Eklöf
- (Denmark) Michael Jepsen Jensen
- (Latvia) Andžejs Ļebedevs
- (Sweden) Fredrik Lindgren
- (Poland) Adrian Miedziński
- (Poland) Przemysław Pawlicki
- (Sweden) Alexander Woentin

2022 team

- (England) Dan Bewley
- (Poland) Kacper Woryna
- (England) Robert Lambert
- (Denmark) Michael Jepsen Jensen
- (Sweden) Joel Andersson
- (Poland) Grzegorz Zengota
- (Poland) Patryk Wojdyło
- (Sweden) Pontus Aspgren
- (Denmark) Peter Kildemand
- (Sweden) Max Belsing

2023 team

- (Sweden) Joel Andersson
- (Sweden) Timo Lahti (as of 31 July 2023)
- (Poland) Maksym Drabik
- (Sweden) Philip Hellström-Bangs
- (Denmark) Michael Jepsen Jensen
- (United Kingdom) Robert Lambert
- (Australia) Jaimon Lidsey
- (Sweden) Emil Millberg
- (Poland) Patryk Wojdylo
- (Poland) Kacper Woryna

== Former top riders ==
Nation	Name	Years	Honours while riding for Smederna
(Sweden)	Olle Segerström	1951–1954	
(Sweden)	Bernt Persson	1964, 1966–1968, 1977–1983	Swedish Champion 1977
(Sweden)	Tommy Jansson	1969–1976	Swedish Champion 1974
(Sweden)	Göte Nordin	1972–1973	
(Sweden)	Bengt Jansson	1973–1978	
(Finland)	Olli Tyrväinen	1985–1997	
(Sweden)	Peter Nahlin	1986–1996, 2001–2004	World Junior Champion 1988
(United States)	Billy Hamill	1991, 1993–2006	World Champion 1996
(England)	Mark Loram	1999–2000	World Champion 2000
(England)	Scott Nicholls	1998–2006	
(Denmark)	Nicki Pedersen	2002–2005	World Champion 2003
(Poland)	Krzysztof Kasprzak	2003–2009	World Junior Champion 2005
(Poland)	Wiesław Jaguś	2006–2009	
