= Pontus Aspgren =

Swedish motorcycle speedway rider

- Born: 15 March 1991 (age 35); Avesta, Sweden
- Nationality: Swedish

Career history

Sweden
- 2011–2012: Västervik
- 2011–2012: Masarna
- 2013–2016: Vargarna
- 2013: Griparna
- 2014–2016: Lejonen
- 2017–2019, 2021–2022: Smederna
- 2017: Örnarna
- 2018: Valsarna
- 2019, 2021: Team Rapid
- 2020: Indianerna

Great Britain
- 2012: Wolverhampton Wolves
- 2013: Rye House Rockets
- 2014: Somerset Rebels
- 2014: Leicester Lions

Poland
- 2011: Lublin
- 2012, 2021: Rybnik
- 2015: Kraków
- 2018: Piła
- 2019–2020: Daugavpils
- 2022: Opole

Denmark
- 2013: Holsted
- 2016: Munkebo

Team honours
- 2014: Premier League Fours

Pontus Aspgren (born 15 March 1991) is a Swedish motorcycle speedway rider.

== Speedway career ==
Aspgren rode in the top tier of British Speedway for the Wolverhampton Wolves during the 2012 Elite League speedway season. The same year, he was part of the Swedish team which won the U21 World Championship, where he was the best Swedish driver.

Aspgren was part of the Somerset Rebels team that won the Premier League Four-Team Championship, which was held on 3 August 2014, at the East of England Arena.

In the Swedish league, Aspgren rode for Vargarna, where he was team captain, Lejonen, Örnarna and Smederna, and was one of the key drivers behind Smederna winning the Swedish Championships.

Aspgren made his 2017 Speedway European Championship debut in 2017.

In 2022, Aspgren helped Smederna win the Swedish Speedway Team Championship during the 2022 campaign despite missing the majority of the season after sustaining a back injury in April.
