= Griparna =

Swedish speedway club

Club information
- Track address: Nyköpings Motorstadion; Svansta 2, 611 94 Nyköping
- Country: Sweden
- Founded: 1949
- League: Allsvenskan
- Website: official website

Club facts
- Nickname: The Grippers
- Track size: 294 metres

Major team honours
Allsvenskan champions	2019
Division 2 North champions	1987

Griparna is a motorcycle speedway club from Nyköping in Sweden, who compete in the Allsvenskan. Their home track known as the Svanstabanan is at the Nyköpings Motorstadion which is located to the North of Nyköping.

== History ==
=== 1949 to 1950 ===
Griparna Speedway first competed in the Swedish league during the 1949 Swedish speedway season, which was only the second season of organised league speedway in Sweden. However, they only competed for one more season in 1950 before dropping out of the league for over 30 years.

=== 1984 to 1994 ===
In 1984, the team returned to compete in the leagues and were placed in division 2 north. The team won their first honours in 1987 after winning the division 2 North. They continued to compete in division 1 until they suffered issues and dropped out of the league at the end of the 1994 Swedish speedway season.

=== 2002 to present ===
In 2002, they made a return competing in the third tier known as division 1. After a second-place finish in 2004, the team participated in the Allsvenskan for the 2005 season. They lost the 2018 Allsvenskan play off final to Piraterna but then won the Allsvenskan title the following year in 2019, defeating Team Rapid in the play off final.

== Teams ==
=== 2022 team ===
- (Sweden) Kim Nilsson
- (Sweden) Peter Ljung
- (Sweden) Anton Karlsson
- (Denmark) Silas Hoegh
- (Sweden) Theo Bergqvist
- (Sweden) John Lindman
- (Denmark) Kenneth Hansen
- (Denmark) Patrick Skaarup
- (Sweden) Sammy van Dyck
- (Sweden) Alexander Liljekvist
- (Sweden) Jonathan Ejnermark

== Notable riders ==
- (Finland) Kauko Nieminen
- (Sweden) Kim Nilsson
- (Finland) Vesa Ylinen
- (Sweden) Fredrik Lindgren
- (Sweden) Oliver Berntzon
- (Denmark) Mikkel Michelsen
- (Finland) Timo Lahti
- (Sweden) Peter Ljung
