= Kim Nilsson =

Swedish motorcycle speedway rider (born 1990)

- Born: 4 February 1990 (age 36); Stockholm, Sweden
- Nationality: Swedish

Career history

Sweden
- 2008: Hammarby
- 2009, 2014–2015, 2021–2024: Griparna
- 2009–2013, 2016–2019: Vargarna
- 2011–2015, 2021–2023: Rospiggarna
- 2016–2020, 2025: Masarna
- 2024–2025: Smederna

Great Britain
- 2009–2011: Newport
- 2011–2016: Lakeside
- 2013: Eastbourne
- 2017: Leicester

Poland
- 2020: Tarnów
- 2022–2025: Landshut

Speedway Grand Prix statistics
- SGP number: 233
- Starts: 18
- Finalist: 1 times
- Winner: 0 times

Individual honours
- 2022: GP Challenge winner

Team honours
- 2008 - 3rd place: U-21 Speedway World Cup

Kim Nilsson (born 4 February 1990) is a Swedish motorcycle speedway rider who won bronze medal in the 2008 Team U-21 World Championship.

== Career details ==
Born on Stockholm, Nilsson rode in British speedway between 2009 and 2017, first in the Premier League for Newport Wasps (2009-11), and in the Elite League for Lakeside Hammers (2011–2013, 2014–2016) Eastbourne Eagles (2013), and Leicester Lions (2017).

Nilsson has raced in five Speedway Grand Prix, scoring a total of 12 points, and in one World Cup event, scoring four points. In 2021, he joined Rospiggarna.

In 2022, Nilsson won the 2023 Speedway Grand Prix Qualification event, which qualified him to take part as a permanent rider for the 2023 Speedway Grand Prix. Also in 2023, he was part of the Swedish team that competed at the 2023 Speedway World Cup in Poland. His debut 2023 Grand Prix season ended in 13th place.

== Family ==
Nilsson's father Tommy was also a professional speedway rider.

== Major results ==
=== World Championship ===
- 2013 Speedway Grand Prix – 33rd (2 pts)
- 2014 Speedway Grand Prix – 29th (3 pts)
- 2016 Speedway Grand Prix – 23rd (5 pts)
- 2017 Speedway Grand Prix – 35th (2 pts)
- 2023 Speedway Grand Prix – 13th (44 pts)
- 2024 Speedway Grand Prix – 20th (8 pts)
- 2025 Speedway Grand Prix – 22nd (4 pts)
- 2026 Speedway Grand Prix – 20th (9 pts)

=== World U21 Championships ===
- Individual U-21 World Championship
  - 2008 - 18th place in Semi-Final 1
  - 2009 - 7th place in Qualifying Round 5
- Team U-21 World Championship (Under-21 Speedway World Cup)
  - 2008 - (Denmark) Holsted - 3rd place (9 pts)
  - 2009 - (Poland) Gorzów Wlkp. - 3rd place (6 pts)

=== European Championships ===
- Individual U-19 European Championship
  - 2008 - (Germany) Stralsund - 9th place (7 pts)
  - 2009 - (Poland) Tarnów - 14th place (3 pts)

== See also ==
- Sweden national speedway team
