= 2003 Speedway Grand Prix of Denmark =

Speedway Grand Prix event

- Venue: Parken Stadium
- Location: Copenhagen, (Denmark)
- Start date: 28 June 2003
- Competitors: 24 (2 reserves)

The 2003 Speedway Grand Prix of Denmark was the fourth round of the 2003 Speedway Grand Prix season (the world championship). It took place on 28 June 2004 at the Parken Stadium in Copenhagen, Denmark.

It was the 9th time that the Speedway Grand Prix of Denmark had been held.

The Grand Prix was by Australian rider Jason Crump (his 7th career Grand Prix win).

== Grand Prix result ==
Pos.	Rider	1	2	3	4	5	6	SF1	SF2	Final	GP Points
1	(Australia) Jason Crump	1	3	1	3			3		3	25
2	(Sweden) Tony Rickardsson	2	3	3					3	2	20
3	(United States) Greg Hancock	2	2	0	2				2	1	18
4	(Denmark) Nicki Pedersen	3	2	2				2		0	16
5	(Poland) Tomasz Gollob	2	2	1	2	2		1			13
6	(Norway) Rune Holta	3	2	0	3				1		13
7	(England) Scott Nicholls	0	3	3				0			11
8	(Australia) Leigh Adams	1	2	2	2				0		11
9	(Australia) Ryan Sullivan	3	1	3	3	1	1				8
10	(Australia) Jason Lyons	2	2	3	0	2	1				8
11	(Czech Republic) Lukáš Dryml	3	3	1	3	0					7
12	(Sweden) Andreas Jonsson	0	1	3	0						7
13	(Poland) Piotr Protasiewicz	3	3	1	1						6
14	(Poland) Tomasz Bajerski	3	0	3	0	1					6
15	(Denmark) Bjarne Pedersen	2	2	0	0						5
16	(Czech Republic) Bohumil Brhel	2	0	2	0	0					5
17	(Sweden) Peter Karlsson	0	3	1							4
18	(Denmark) Charlie Gjedde	0	2	1							4
19	(Poland) Robert Dados	1	3	0							3
20	(Denmark) Ronni Pedersen	0	2	0							3
21	(Russia) Roman Povazhny	1	1								2
22	(Australia) Todd Wiltshire	1	1								2
23	(Sweden) Mikael Max	1	0								1
24	(Denmark) Jesper B. Jensen	0	0								1

== Heat by heat ==
- Heat 01 Dryml, B Pedersen, Dados, Gjedde
- Heat 02 Protasiewicz, Gollob, Wiltshire, Jensen
- Heat 03 Sullivan, Lyons, Povazhny, Karlsson
- Heat 04 Bajerski, Brhel, Max, R Pedersen
- Heat 05 Dados, R Pedersen, Povazhny, Jensen
- Heat 06 Karlsson, Gjedde, Wiltshire, Max
- Heat 07 Dryml, Gollob, Sullivan, Brhel
- Heat 08 Protasiewicz, B Pedersen, Lyons, Bajerski
- Heat 09 N Pedersen, Hancock, Adams, Jonsson
- Heat 10 Holta, Rickardsson, Crump, Nicholls
- Heat 11 Sullivan, Bajerski, Gjedde, Dados
- Heat 12 Lyons, Brhel, Karlsson, R Pedersen
- Heat 13 Nicholls, N Pedersen, Dryml, Brhel
- Heat 14 Rickardsson, Adams, Protasiewicz, Bajerski
- Heat 15 Crump, Hancock, Gollob, Lyons
- Heat 16 Sullivan, Holta, Jonsson, B Pedersen
- Heat 17 Dryml, Gollob, Bajerski, B Pedersen
- Heat 18 Jonsson, Lyons, Protasiewicz, Brhel
- Heat 19 Nicholls, Adams, Crump, Holta
- Heat 20 Rickardsson, N Pedersen, Sullivan, Hancock
- Heat 21 Crump, Hancock, Lyons, Dryml
- Heat 22 Holta, Gollob, Sullivan, Jonsson
- Semi Finals
- Heat 23 Crump, N Pedersen, Gollob, Nicholls
- Heat 24 Rickardsson, Hancock, Holta, Adams

Final

- Heat 25 Crump, Rickardsson, Hancock, N Pedersen
