= 2003 Speedway Grand Prix of Great Britain =

Speedway Grand Prix event

- Venue: Millennium Stadium
- Location: Cardiff, (Wales)
- Start date: 14 June 2003
- Competitors: 24 (2 reserves)

The 2003 Speedway Grand Prix of Great Britain was the third round of the 2003 Speedway Grand Prix season (the world championship). It took place on 14 June 2003 at the Millennium Stadium in Cardiff, Wales.

It was the 9th time that the Speedway Grand Prix of Great Britain had been held.

The Grand Prix was by the Danish rider Nicki Pedersen (his 2nd career Grand Prix win).

== Grand Prix result ==
Pos.	Rider	1	2	3	4	5	6	SF1	SF2	Final	GP Points
1	(Denmark) Nicki Pedersen	3	1	3	1	3	2		3	3	25
2	(Australia) Jason Crump	2	2	3	3			2		2	20
3	(Sweden) Tony Rickardsson	0	3	3					2	1	18
4	(United States) Greg Hancock	1	3	0	3			3		0	16
5	(England) Scott Nicholls	3	1	3	2	2			1		13
6	(Australia) Leigh Adams	1	2	1	2			1			13
7	(Sweden) Andreas Jonsson	3	2	1	3	3			0		11
8	(Norway) Rune Holta	0	2	2				0			11
9	(Poland) Piotr Protasiewicz	1	2	2	2	1	1				8
10	(Czech Republic) Lukáš Dryml	2	0	2	1						8
11	(Australia) Ryan Sullivan	2	0	2	0						7
12	(Poland) Tomasz Bajerski	3	3	0	0						7
13	(Sweden) Peter Karlsson	2	3	1	1						6
14	(Denmark) Ronni Pedersen	0	2	2	1	1					6
15	(Australia) Todd Wiltshire	3	3	0	0						5
16	(Sweden) Mikael Max	3	0	0							5
17	(England) Lee Richardson	1	3	1							4
18	(Denmark) Bjarne Pedersen	2	0	1							4
19	(England) Simon Stead	2	0	0							3
20	(Poland) Tomasz Gollob	0	3	0							3
21	(Australia) Jason Lyons	0	1								2
22	(England) David Howe	0	1								2
23	(England) Chris Harris	1	0								1
24	(Czech Republic) Bohumil Brhel	1	0								1

== Heat by heat ==
- Heat 01 Wiltshire, Stead, Harris, Gollob
- Heat 02 N Pedersen, Crump, Brhel, Howe
- Heat 03 Nicholls, Karlsson, Richardson, Lyons
- Heat 04 Jonsson, B Pedersen, Protasiewicz, R Pedersen
- Heat 05 Richardson, R Pedersen, Howe, Harris [F/Ret]
- Heat 06 Gollob, Protasiewicz, Lyons, Brhel [E/F]
- Heat 07 Wiltshire, Crump, Nicholls, B Pedersen
- Heat 08 Karlsson, Jonsson, N Pedersen, Stead
- Heat 09 Bajerski, Sullivan, Hancock, Rickardsson [Ex/T]
- Heat 10 Max, Dryml, Adams, Holta [E/F]
- Heat 11 Nicholls, Protasiewicz, Richardson, Stead
- Heat 12 N Pedersen, R Pedersen, B Pedersen, Gollob [Ex]
- Heat 13 Bajerski, Holta, R Pedersen, Wiltshire [F/Ex]
- Heat 14 Hancock, Protasiewicz, Karlsson, Dryml
- Heat 15 Crump, Adams, N Pedersen, Sullivan
- Heat 16 Rickardsson, Nicholls, Jonsson, Max
- Heat 17 N Pedersen, Dryml, R Pedersen, Max
- Heat 18 Jonsson, Sullivan, Karlsson, Wiltshire
- Heat 19 Crump, Nicholls, Protasiewicz, Bajerski
- Heat 20 Rickardsson, Holta, Adams, Hancock
- Heat 21 Hancock, N Pedersen, Protasiewicz, Sullivan
- Heat 22 Jonsson, Adams, Dryml, Bajerski
- semi Finals
- Heat 23 Hancock, Crump, Adams, Holta
- Heat 24 N Pedersen, Rickardsson, Nicholls, Jonsson
- Final
- Heat 25 N Pedersen, Crump, Rickardsson, Hancock
