= 2003 Speedway Grand Prix of Sweden =

Speedway Grand Prix event

- Venue: Stadion Brovalla
- Location: Avesta, (Sweden)
- Start date: 31 May 2003
- Competitors: 24 (2 reserves)

The 2003 Speedway Grand Prix of Sweden was the second round of the 2003 Speedway Grand Prix season (the world championship). It took place on 31 May 2003 at the Stadion Brovalla in Avesta, Sweden.

It was the 9th time that the Speedway Grand Prix of Sweden had been held.

The Grand Prix was by the Australian rider Ryan Sullivan (his 3rd career Grand Prix win).

== Grand Prix result ==
Pos.	Rider	1	2	3	4	5	6	SF1	SF2	Final	GP Points
1	(Australia) Ryan Sullivan	2	3	2	3				3	3	25
2	(Czech Republic) Lukáš Dryml	2	3	1	2			2		2	20
3	(Australia) Leigh Adams	2	3	2					2	1	18
4	(United States) Greg Hancock	3	2	2	0	3		3		0	16
5	(Sweden) Tony Rickardsson	3	3	3				1			13
6	(Sweden) Mikael Max	3	1	3	2	0	3		1		13
7	(Norway) Rune Holta	0	3	2				0			11
8	(Poland) Tomasz Bajerski	2	0	2	2	1	2		0		11
9	(Poland) Tomasz Gollob	1	1	3	1						8
10	(Denmark) Nicki Pedersen	0	1	3	1						8
11	(Poland) Krzysztof Cegielski	3	3	0	2	0					7
12	(Denmark) Bjarne Pedersen	3	2	1	2	0					7
13	(Poland) Piotr Protasiewicz	1	1	1							6
14	(Australia) Jason Lyons	1	3	3	0	1					6
15	(Australia) Jason Crump	3	0	0							5
16	(Australia) Todd Wiltshire	2	1	2	0	0					5
17	(Denmark) Hans Andersen	2	0	1							4
18	(Denmark) Ronni Pedersen	1	2	1							4
19	(Czech Republic) Bohumil Brhel	1	3	0							3
20	(Sweden) Peter Karlsson	0	2	0							3
21	(Sweden) Andreas Jonsson	1	1								2
22	(England) Scott Nicholls	0	1								2
23	(England) Lee Richardson	0	0								1
24	(Sweden) Magnus Zetterström	0	0								1

== Heat by heat ==
- Heat 01 Hancock, Bajerski, Brhel, Zetterstrom
- Heat 02 Cegielski, Andersen, R Pedersen, Karlsson
- Heat 03 Max, Wiltshire, Jonsson, Nicholls
- Heat 04 B Pedersen, Sullivan, Lyons, Richardson
- Heat 05 Brhel, Karlsson, Jonsson, Richardson
- Heat 06 Lyons, R Pedersen, Nicholls, Zetterstrom
- Heat 07 Sullivan, Hancock, Max, Andersen
- Heat 08 Cegielski, B Pedersen, Wiltshire, Bajerski
- Heat 09 Rickardsson, Adams, Gollob, Holta
- Heat 10 Crump, Dryml, Protasiewicz, N Pedersen
- Heat 11 Max, Bajerski, R Pedersen, Brhel
- Heat 12 Lyons, Wiltshire, Andersen, Karlsson
- Heat 13 Rickardsson, Sullivan, N Pedersen, Wiltshire
- Heat 14 Dryml, Bajerski, Gollob, Cegielski
- Heat 15 Adams, Hancock, Protasiewicz, Lyons
- Heat 16 Holta, Max, B Pedersen, Crump
- Heat 17 N Pedersen, Cegielski, Protasiewicz, Crump
- Heat 18 Gollob, B Pedersen, Lyons, Wiltshire
- Heat 19 Rickardsson, Adams, Bajerski, Max
- Heat 20 Sullivan, Holta, Dryml, Hancock
- Heat 21 Hancock, Bajerski, N Pedersen, B Pedersen
- Heat 22 Max, Dryml, Gollob, Cegielski
- Semi Finals
- Heat 23 Hancock, Dryml, Rickardsson, Holta
- Heat 24 Sullivan, Adams, Max, Bajerski
- Final
- Heat 25 Sullivan, Dryml, Adams, Hancock
