= 2003 Speedway Grand Prix of Norway =

Speedway Grand Prix event

- Venue: Vikingskipet
- Location: Hamar, (Norway)
- Start date: 4 October 2003
- Competitors: 24 (2 reserves)

The 2003 Speedway Grand Prix of Norway was the ninth and final round of the 2003 Speedway Grand Prix season (the world championship). It took place on 4 October 2003 at the Vikingskipet in Hamar, Norway.

It was the second time that the Speedway Grand Prix of Norway had been held.

American rider Greg Hancock won the Grand Prix (his 6th career Grand Prix win).

== Grand Prix result ==
Pos.	Rider	1	2	3	4	5	6	SF1	SF2	Final	GP Points
1	(United States) Greg Hancock	0	1	3	3				3	3	25
2	(Denmark) Nicki Pedersen	0	3	3	1	3		2		2	20
3	(Denmark) Bjarne Pedersen	2	0	3	2			3		1	18
4	(Sweden) Andreas Jonsson	2	0	3	3	2			2	0	16
5	(England) Scott Nicholls	2	3	1	3			1			13
6	(Norway) Rune Holta	3	3	2	3				1		13
7	(Australia) Jason Crump	3	2	2					0		11
8	(Poland) Tomasz Gollob	1	0	2	2			0			11
9	(Australia) Leigh Adams	1	0	2	1						8
10	(Denmark) Ronni Pedersen	3	2	2	1	1					8
11	(England) Lee Richardson	2	2	0	0						7
12	(Australia) Ryan Sullivan	3	3	3	0	0					7
13	(Sweden) Tony Rickardsson	3	2	0	1						6
14	(Denmark) Hans Andersen	2	1	2	0	1					6
15	(England) Mark Loram	2	1	2	1	0					5
16	(Poland) Piotr Protasiewicz	3	1	0							5
17	(Australia) Jason Lyons	1	2	1							4
18	(Norway) Lars Gunnestad	0	2	1							4
19	(Sweden) Mikael Max	1	3	0							3
20	(Australia) Todd Wiltshire	1	3	0							3
21	(Sweden) Peter Karlsson	0	1								2
22	(Poland) Tomasz Bajerski	0	1								2
23	(Czech Republic) Bohumil Brhel	0	0								1
24	(Finland) Joonas Kylmäkorpi	1	0								1

== Heat by heat ==
- Heat 01 Holta, B Pedersen, Kylmakorpi, Brhel
- Heat 02 Sullivan, Loram, Max, Gunnestad
- Heat 03 R Pedersen, Andersen, Wiltshire, Karlsson
- Heat 04 Rickardsson, Jonsson, Lyons, Bajerski
- Heat 05 Wiltshire, Gunnestad, Bajerski, Kylmakorpi
- Heat 06 Max, Lyons, Karlsson, Brhel
- Heat 07 Holta, R Pedersen, Loram, Jonsson
- Heat 08 Sullivan, Rickardsson, Andersen, B Pedersen
- Heat 09 Protasiewicz, Nicholls, Gollob, Hancock
- Heat 10 Crump, Richardson, Adams, N Pedersen
- Heat 11 B Pedersen, Loram, Lyons, Wiltshire
- Heat 12 Jonsson, Andersen, Gunnestad, Max
- Heat 13 N Pedersen, Holta, Protasiewicz, Andersen
- Heat 14 Sullivan, Richardson, Loram, Gollob
- Heat 15 Nicholls, R Pedersen, Jonsson, Adams
- Heat 16 B Pedersen, Crump, Hancock, Rickardsson
- Heat 17 Jonsson, Gollob, Rickardsson, Protasiewicz
- Heat 18 Hancock, Adams, Andersen, Loram
- Heat 19 Nicholls, Crump, N Pedersen, Richardson
- Heat 20 Holta, B Pedersen, R Pedersen, Sullivan
- Heat 21 N Pedersen, Jonsson, Adams, Sullivan
- Heat 22 Hancock, Gollob, R Pedersen, Richardson
- Semi Finals
- Heat 23 B Pedersen, N Pedersen, Nicholls, Gollob
- Heat 24 Hancock, Jonsson, Holta, Crump [Ex]
- Finals
- Heat 25 Hancock, N Pedersen, B Pedersen, Jonsson
