= 2012 Speedway World Cup =

53rd edition of the annual motorcycle speedway World Cup competition

Speedway World Cup
- Venue: Målilla
- Location: Sweden
- Start date: 7 July
- End date: 14 July
- Nations: 8

Champions
- Denmark

The 2012 FIM Speedway World Cup (SWC) was the twelfth FIM Speedway World Cup, the annual international speedway world championship tournament. It took place between 7 July and 14 July 2012 and involved eight national teams. Six teams were seeded through to the tournament and two qualification rounds were held in April and May 2012 to determine the final place. As host nation, Sweden were seeded to the final.

== Qualification ==
The top six nations from the 2011 Speedway World Cup (Poland, Australia, Sweden, Denmark, Russia and Great Britain) were granted automatic qualification with Sweden given a birth in the final as host nation. The remaining two places were divided among two qualifying rounds. Qualifying Round One was hosted in Herxheim, Germany, and Qualifying Round Two was hosted at the Ilirija Sports Park in Ljubljana, Slovenia. Germany and the USA qualified to the Tournament.

- Qualifying Round One
- (Germany) Sandbahn Rennen Herxheim, Herxheim
- 22 April 2012

National team	Pts	Scorers
Germany	37	Martin Smolinski 12, Max Dilger 10, Tobias Busch 9, Kevin Wölbert 6
Latvia	36	Kjasts Puodžuks 11, Maksims Bogdanovs 10, Andžejs Ļebedevs 9, Jevgēņijs Karavackis 6
Finland	29	Timo Lahti 11, Tero Aarnio 10, Juha Hautamäki 5, Jari Mäkinen 3
France	16	David Bellego 6, Mathieu Trésarrieu 5, Stéphane Trésarrieu 3, Xavier Muratet 2

- Qualifying Round Two
- (Slovenia) Ilirija Sports Park, Ljubljana
- 7 May 2012

National team	Pts	Scorers
United States	44	Greg Hancock 13, Ricky Wells 11, Billy Hamill 10, Ryan Fisher 10
Slovenia	40	Matej Žagar 19, Maks Gregoric 15, Matic Voldrih 6, Matic Ivačič 0
Ukraine	23	Andrey Karpov 14, Aleksandr Loktaev 5, Kiril Tsukanov 3, Stanislav Melnichuk 1
Italy	21	Mattia Carpanese 9, Nicolás Covatti 6, Cristian Carrica 5, Nicolas Vincentin 1

=== Qualified teams ===
Team	Qualified as	Finals appearance	Last appearance	2010 place
Sweden	Host	12th	2011	3
Poland	2011 SWC top six	12th	2011	1
Australia	2011 SWC top six	12th	2011	2
Denmark	2011 SWC top six	12th	2011	4
Russia	2011 SWC top six	12th	2011	5
Great Britain	2011 SWC top six	10th	2011	6
Germany	QR 1 Winner	6th	2011	8
United States	QR 2 Winner	11th	2007	—

== Tournament ==
Semifinals
July 7 — Bydgoszcz
Russia	35
Poland	34
Denmark	33
United States	23
July 9 — King's Lynn
Australia	45
Great Britain	41
Czech Republic	30
Germany	15

Race-off
July 12 — Målilla
Denmark	42
Poland	38
Great Britain	30
Czech Republic	19

Final
July 14 — Målilla (details)
Denmark	39
Australia	36
Russia	30
Sweden	24

== Semi-finals ==
National team	Pts	Scorers
Russia	35	Emil Sayfutdinov 16, Artem Laguta 7, Roman Povazhny 6, Grigory Laguta 6
Poland	34	Tomasz Gollob 12, Maciej Janowski 11, Piotr Protasiewicz 9, Grzegorz Walasek 2
Denmark	33	Niels Kristian Iversen 10, Michael Jepsen Jensen 8, Leon Madsen 8, Mikkel B. Jensen 7
United States	23	Greg Hancock 16, Ricky Wells 3, Billy Hamill 2, Ryan Fisher 2

National team	Pts	Scorers
Australia	45	Jason Crump 15, Chris Holder 12, Davey Watt 11, Troy Batchelor 7
Great Britain	41	Chris Harris 17, Scott Nicholls 11, Tai Woffinden 8, Danny King 5
Czech Republic	30	Aleš Dryml Jr. 15, Lukáš Dryml 6, Matěj Kůs 6, Josef Franc 3
Germany	15	Kevin Wölbert 7, Martin Smolinski 6, Max Dilger 1, Tobias Kroner 1

== Race off ==
- G&B Stadium, Målilla

National team	Pts	Scorers
Denmark	42	Niels Kristian Iversen 13, Michael Jepsen Jensen 13, Nicki Pedersen 12, Leon Madsen 4
Poland	38	Tomasz Gollob 15, Krzysztof Buczkowski 11, Maciej Janowski 7, Piotr Protasiewicz 5
Great Britain	30	Tai Woffinden 14, Chris Harris 11, Danny King 3, Scott Nicholls 2
Czech Republic	19	Josef Franc 11, Aleš Dryml Jr. 4, Lukáš Dryml 3, Matěj Kůs 1

== Final ==
- G&B Stadium, Målilla

(full details)

National team	Pts	Scorers
Denmark	39	Niels Kristian Iversen 11, Michael Jepsen Jensen 11, Nicki Pedersen 9, Mikkel B Jensen 8
Australia	36	Chris Holder 16, Jason Crump 10, Darcy Ward 7, Davey Watt 3
Russia	30	Emil Sayfutdinov 17, Grigory Laguta 8, Artem Laguta 5, Roman Povazhny 0,
Sweden	24	Andreas Jonsson 11, Fredrik Lindgren 9, Thomas H. Jonasson 3, Peter Ljung 1,

== Final classification ==
Pos.	National team	Pts.
Gold	Denmark	39
Silver	Australia	36
Bronze	Russia	30
4	Sweden	24

== See also ==
- 2012 Speedway Grand Prix
- 2012 Team Speedway Junior World Championship
