= 2003 Speedway Grand Prix of Scandinavia =

Speedway Grand Prix event

- Venue: Ullevi
- Location: Gothenburg, (Sweden)
- Start date: 30 August 2003
- Competitors: 24 (2 reserves)

The 2003 Speedway Grand Prix of Scandinavia was the sixth round of the 2003 Speedway Grand Prix season (the world championship). It took place on 30 August 2003 at the Ullevi in Gothenburg, Sweden.

It was the second time that the Speedway Grand Prix of Scandinavia had been held.

The Grand Prix was by the Australian rider Ryan Sullivan (his 4th career Grand Prix win).

== Grand Prix result ==
Pos.	Rider	1	2	3	4	5	6	SF1	SF2	Final	GP Points
1	(Australia) Ryan Sullivan	3	3	2	1	3			3	3	25
2	(England) Scott Nicholls	2	3	2				2		2	20
3	(Australia) Leigh Adams	3	3	3				3		1	18
4	(Australia) Jason Crump	3	3	3					2	0	16
5	(United States) Greg Hancock	1	1	3	2			1			13
6	(Sweden) Andreas Jonsson	3	1	2	1	3	2		1		13
7	(Poland) Tomasz Gollob	2	3	2					0		11
8	(Denmark) Hans Andersen	1	3	2	2	1	3	0			11
9	(England) Lee Richardson	2	0	3	2	0	1				8
10	(Sweden) Mikael Max	2	2	2	0	1					8
11	(Denmark) Nicki Pedersen	1	1	2	0						7
12	(Sweden) Peter Ljung	0	2	3	1	2	0				7
13	(Australia) Todd Wiltshire	2	2	0	1						6
14	(Sweden) Tony Rickardsson	0	0	1							6
15	(Poland) Tomasz Bajerski	0	0	0							5
16	(Norway) Rune Holta	3	3	0	0						5
17	(England) Mark Loram	3	1	1							4
18	(Sweden) David Ruud	1	3	1							4
19	(Poland) Piotr Protasiewicz	1	2	0							3
20	(Denmark) Bjarne Pedersen	2	0	0							3
21	(Australia) Jason Lyons	0	1								2
22	(Finland) Joonas Kylmäkorpi	0	1								2
23	(Czech Republic) Bohumil Brhel	0	0								1
24	(Denmark) Ronni Pedersen	1	0								1

== Heat by heat ==
- Heat 01 Sullivan, B Pedersen, Protasiewicz, Ljung
- Heat 02 Holta, Wiltshire, Ruud, Lyons
- Heat 03 Loram, Max, Andersen, Kylmakorpi
- Heat 04 Jonsson, Richardsson, R Pedersen, Brhel
- Heat 05 Andersen, Protasiewicz, Lyons, Brhel
- Heat 06 Ruud, Ljung, Kylmakorpi, R Pedersen
- Heat 07 Sullivan, Wiltshire, Loram, Richardson
- Heat 08 Holta, Max, Jonsson, B Pedersen
- Heat 09 Adams, Gollob, Hancock, Rickardsson
- Heat 10 Crump, Nicholls, N Pedersen, Bajerski
- Heat 11 Ljung, Andersen, Loram, B Pedersen
- Heat 12 Richardson, Jonsson, Ruud, Protasiewicz
- Heat 13 Adams, Sullivan, Jonsson, Bajerski
- Heat 14 Nicholls, Andersen, Hancock, Holta
- Heat 15 Gollob, Richardson, N Pedersen, Wiltshire
- Heat 16 Crump, Max, Ljung, Rickardsson
- Heat 17 Jonsson, N Pedersen, Rickardsson, Holta
- Heat 18 Hancock, Ljung, Wiltshire, Bajerski
- Heat 19 Adams, Gollob, Andersen, Max
- Heat 20 Crump, Nicholls, Sullivan, Richardson
- Heat 21 Andersen, Jonsson, Richardson, Ljung
- Heat 22 Sullivan, Hancock, Max, N Pedersen
- Semi Final
- Heat 23 Adams, Nicholls, Hancock, Andersen
- Heat 24 Sullivan, Crump, Jonsson, Gollob
- Final
- Heat 25 Sullivan, Nicholls, Adams, Crump
