= Rafał Szombierski =

Polish speedway rider

- Born: 12 March 1982 (age 44); Pyskowice, Poland
- Nationality: Polish

Career history

Poland
- 1999–2007, 2014–2017: Rybnik
- 2008: Rivne
- 2010–2014: Częstochowa

Individual honours
- 2003: World U-21bronze

Team honours
- 2004: European Pairs Championship bronze

Rafał Szombierski (born 12 March 1982 in Pyskowice, Poland) is a Polish former motorcycle speedway rider.

== Career ==
Szombierski rode in the Team Speedway Polish Championship for Rybnik from 1999 to 2007 and for Rivne Speedway in 2008. After missing 2009, he joined Włókniarz Częstochowa for five seasons before returning to Rybnik, where he spent the remainder of his career from 2015 to 2017.

Szombierski won the bronze medal at the 2001 Speedway Under-21 World Championship held on 26 August at the East of England Showground in England.

In 2022, Szombierski was sentenced to nine years in prison while driving under the influence of alcohol and causing a serious accident.

== Results ==
=== Speedway Grand Prix ===
2003 Speedway Grand Prix Final Championship standings (Riding No 24)
Race no.	Grand Prix	Pos.	Pts.	Heats	Draw No
8 /9	(Poland) Polish SGP	22	2	(0,1)	24

permanent speedway rider
wild card, track reserve or qualified reserve
rider not classified (track reserve who did not start)

=== World Under-21 Championship ===
- 2000 - 12th place in Semi-Final
- 2003 - 3rd place (11 points +3)

=== Individual European Championship ===
- 2002 - 3rd place (11 points +3)

=== European Pairs Championship ===
- 2004 - 3rd place (9 points +2)

=== Polish Under-21 Pairs Championship ===
- 2002 - 2nd place
- 2003 - Polish Champion

=== Polish Under-21 Team Championship ===
- 2000 - 2nd place with Rybnik
- 2001 - 3rd place with Rybnik
- 2002 - Polish Champion with Rybnik

=== Bronze Helmet (U-19) ===
- 2001 - Winner

== See also ==
- List of Speedway Grand Prix riders
- Poland national speedway team
