= 2012 Speedway World Cup final =

2012 FIM Speedway World Cup – Final
Information
- Date: 14 July 2012
- City: Målilla
- Event: 4 of 4 (51)
- Referee: Craig Ackroyd

Stadium details
- Stadium: G&B Stadium
- Length: 305 m
- Track: speedway track

SWC Results
- Attendance: 5,000
- Best Time: (Australia) Chris Holder; 55.58 secs (in Heat 1)

The 2012 FIM Speedway World Cup Final was the fourth and final race of the 2012 Speedway World Cup season. It was run on July 14 and was won by Denmark from Australia, Russia, and the host nation Sweden. The Final took place at the G&B Stadium in Målilla.

Denmark were led to victory by their captain, Niels K Iversen and Michael Jepsen Jensen, both of whom scored 11 points. They were supported by triple World Champion Nicki Pedersen (9 points) and Mikkel B Jensen (8 points). Australia, led by triple World Champ Jason Crump and 2012 World Champion Chris Holder finished second from Russia who were led by Emil Sayfutdinov who top scored for the meeting with 17 points (Holder was next with 16). Host nation Sweden disappointed on the night to finish fourth and last.

== Results ==
Pos.	National team	Pts.
1	Denmark	39
2	Australia	36
3	Russia	30
4	Sweden	24

== Scores ==
- Denmark 39 - Niels K Iversen (C) (11), Michael Jepsen Jensen (11), Nicki Pedersen (9), Mikkel B Jensen (8)
- Australia 36 - Jason Crump (C) (10), Darcy Ward (7), Davey Watt (3), Chris Holder (16)
- Russia 30 - Roman Povazhny (C) (0), Emil Sayfutdinov (17), Grigory Laguta (8), Artem Laguta (5)
- Sweden 24 - Andreas Jonsson (C) (11), Fredrik Lindgren (9), Peter Ljung (1), Thomas H. Jonasson (3)

== See also ==
- 2012 Speedway World Cup
- motorcycle speedway
