= 2003 Speedway Grand Prix of Poland =

Speedway Grand Prix event

- Venue: Polonia Stadium
- Location: Bydgoszcz, (Poland)
- Start date: 20 September 2003
- Competitors: 24 (2 reserves)

The 2003 Speedway Grand Prix of Poland was the eighth round of the 2003 Speedway Grand Prix season (the world championship). It took place on 20 September 2003 at the Polonia Stadium in Bydgoszcz, Poland.

It was the 10th time that a Speedway Grand Prix of Poland had been held.

Polish rider Tomasz Gollob won the Grand Prix (his 8th career Grand Prix win and the 5th time that Gollob had won the Polish Grand Prix).

== Grand Prix result ==
Pos.	Rider	1	2	3	4	5	6	SF1	SF2	Final	GP Points
1	(Poland) Tomasz Gollob	3	3	3				3		3	25
2	(Australia) Jason Crump	1	2	2					3	2	20
3	(Denmark) Nicki Pedersen	2	3	1	3				2	1	18
4	(Poland) Piotr Protasiewicz	2	0	3	2	2		2		0	16
5	(England) Scott Nicholls	3	2	1	3	2			1		13
6	(Poland) Jarosław Hampel	0	1					1			13
7	(Australia) Leigh Adams	1	3	1	3			0			11
8	(England) Lee Richardson	2	3	2	3				0		11
9	(Norway) Rune Holta	2	0	2	1						8
10	(United States) Greg Hancock	3	3	3	0	1					8
11	(England) Mark Loram	3	1	3	1	3	0				7
12	(Sweden) Andreas Jonsson	0	3	0	0						7
13	(Sweden) Tony Rickardsson	3	0	1							6
14	(Denmark) Hans Andersen	0	0	1							6
15	(Sweden) Mikael Max	2	0	2	1	0					5
16	(Czech Republic) Bohumil Brhel	1	2	2	1	0					5
17	(Denmark) Bjarne Pedersen	2	1	1							4
18	(Sweden) Peter Karlsson	1	3	1							4
19	(Australia) Ryan Sullivan	1	2	0							3
20	(Australia) Todd Wiltshire	0	3	0							3
21	(Poland) Rafał Szombierski	3	3	0	2	2	1				2
22	(Australia) Jason Lyons	0	1								2
23	(Poland) Tomasz Bajerski	1	0								1
24	(Denmark) Ronni Pedersen	0	0								1

== Heat by heat ==
- Heat 01 Loram, B Pedersen, Brhel, Szombierski
- Heat 02 Hampel, Protasiewicz, Sullivan, R Pedersen
- Heat 03 Nicholls, Max, Karlsson, Wiltshire
- Heat 04 Hancock, Richardson, Bajerski, Lyons
- Heat 05 Karlsson, Brhel, Lyons, R Pedersen
- Heat 06 Wiltshire, Sullivan, Szombierski, Bajerski
- Heat 07 Richardson, Nicholls, Loram, Protasiewicz
- Heat 08 Hampel, Hancock, B Pedersen, Max
- Heat 09 Gollob, Holta, Crump, Jonsson
- Heat 10 Rickardsson, N Pedersen, Adams, Andersen
- Heat 11 Loram, Max, Karlsson, Sullivan
- Heat 12 Protasiewicz, Brhel, B Pedersen, Wiltshire
- Heat 13 Gollob, Richardson, Brhel, Andersen
- Heat 14 N Pedersen, Crump, Max, Hampel
- Heat 15 Adams, Protasiewicz, Nicholls, Holta
- Heat 16 Jonsson, Hancock, Loram, Rickardsson
- Heat 17 Nicholls, Hampel, Rickardsson, Brhel
- Heat 18 Loram, Holta, Andersen, Max
- Heat 19 Gollob, Crump, Adams, Hancock
- Heat 20 Richardson, Protasiewicz, N Pedersen, Jonsson
- Heat 21 Adams, Nicholls, Holta, Jonsson
- Heat 22 N Pedersen, Hampel, Hancock, Loram
- Semi Final
- Heat 23 Gollob, Protasiewicz, Hampel, Adams
- Heat 24 Crump, N Pedersen, Nicholls, Richardson
- Final
- Heat 25 Gollob, Crump, N Pedersen, Protasiewicz
