= 2003 Speedway Grand Prix of Czech Republic =

Speedway Grand Prix event

- Venue: Markéta Stadium
- Location: Prague, Czech Republic
- Start date: 6 September 2003
- Competitors: 24 (2 reserves)

The 2003 Speedway Grand Prix of Czech Republic was the seventh round of the 2003 Speedway Grand Prix season (the world championship). It took place on 6 September 2003 at the Markéta Stadium in Prague, Czech Republic.

It was the 7th time that the Speedway Grand Prix of Czech Republic had been held.

The Grand Prix was by Australian rider Jason Crump (his 8th career Grand Prix win).

== Grand Prix result ==
Pos.	Rider	1	2	3	4	5	6	SF1	SF2	Final	GP Points
1	(Australia) Jason Crump	3	3	1	3				3	3	25
2	(Sweden) Tony Rickardsson	2	3	2	3				2	2	20
3	(Denmark) Nicki Pedersen	3	3	3	1	3	2	2		1	18
4	(Norway) Rune Holta	3	2	3	2			3		0	16
5	(Czech Republic) Tomáš Topinka	0	3	2	0	3	2		1		13
6	(Sweden) Andreas Jonsson	1	3	3				1			13
7	(Denmark) Hans Andersen	1	3	0	3			0			11
8	(Australia) Leigh Adams	2	2	2					0		11
9	(Denmark) Bjarne Pedersen	3	1	2	1	1					8
10	(Poland) Tomasz Gollob	3	0	2	1						8
11	(England) Lee Richardson	1	2	2	0	2	0				7
12	(Sweden) Mikael Max	3	2	2	1	0					7
13	(United States) Greg Hancock	0	1	1							6
14	(England) Scott Nicholls	0	1	1							6
15	(Australia) Ryan Sullivan	2	1	0							5
16	(Czech Republic) Bohumil Brhel	0	3	3	0	0					5
17	(England) Mark Loram	2	1	1							4
18	(Poland) Piotr Protasiewicz	1	2	1							4
19	(Australia) Todd Wiltshire	2	0	0							3
20	(Czech Republic) Aleš Dryml Jr.	2	0	0							3
21	(Sweden) Peter Karlsson	1	1								2
22	(Poland) Tomasz Bajerski	1	1								2
23	(Australia) Jason Lyons	0	0								1
24	(Czech Republic) Josef Franc	0	0								1

== Heat by heat ==
- Heat 01 Max, Loram, Bajerski, Franc
- Heat 02 Holta, Dryml, Protasiewicz, Topinka
- Heat 03 B Pedersen, Wiltshire, Richardson, Brhel
- Heat 04 N Pedersen, Rickardsson, Karlsson, Lyons
- Heat 05 Topinka, Richardson, Bajerski, Lyons
- Heat 06 Brhel, Protasiewicz, Karlsson, Franc
- Heat 07 Rickardsson, Max, B Pedersen, Dryml
- Heat 08 N Pedersen, Holta, Loram, Wiltshire
- Heat 09 Crump, Sullivan, Andersen, Hancock
- Heat 10 Gollob, Adams, Jonsson, Nicholls
- Heat 11 N Pedersen, Topinka, Protasiewicz, Wiltshire
- Heat 12 Brhel, Richardson, Loram, Dryml
- Heat 13 Crump, Rickardsson, Nicholls, Richardson
- Heat 14 Andersen, Adams, N Pedersen, Topinka
- Heat 15 Jonsson, Max, Sullivan, Brhel
- Heat 16 Holta, B Pedersen, Hancock, Gollob
- Heat 17 Topinka, Gollob, Nicholls, Sullivan
- Heat 18 N Pedersen, Richardson, Hancock, Brhel
- Heat 19 Jonsson, Adams, B Pedersen, Crump
- Heat 20 Rickardsson, Holta, Max, Andersen
- Heat 21 Andersen, Topinka, B Pedersen, Richardson
- Heat 22 Crump, N Pedersen, Gollob, Max
- Semi Finals
- Heat 23 Holta, N Pedersen, Jonsson, Andersen
- Heat 24 Crump, Rickardsson, Topinka, Adams
- Finals
- Heat 25 Crump, Rickardsson, N Pedersen, Holta
