= 2003 Speedway Grand Prix of Europe =

Speedway Grand Prix event

- Venue: Stadion Śląski
- Location: Chorzów, (Poland)
- Start date: 17 May 2003
- Competitors: 24 (2 reserves)

The 2003 Speedway Grand Prix of Europe was the first round of the 2003 Speedway Grand Prix season (the world championship). It took place on 17 May 2003 at the Stadion Śląski in Chorzów, Poland.

It was the third time that the Speedway Grand Prix of Europe had been held.

The Grand Prix was by the Swedish rider Tony Rickardsson (his 12th career Grand Prix win).

== Grand Prix result ==
Pos.	Rider	1	2	3	4	5	6	SF1	SF2	Final	GP Points
1	(Sweden) Tony Rickardsson	3	3	3				3		3	25
2	(Denmark) Nicki Pedersen	0	3	3	2	2			3	2	20
3	(Czech Republic) Lukáš Dryml	2	2	1	3	2			2	1	18
4	(Poland) Tomasz Gollob	3	3	0	3			2		0	16
5	(Poland) Piotr Protasiewicz	2	3	3	2			1			13
6	(Norway) Rune Holta	3	0	2	2	1	3		1		13
7	(Australia) Jason Crump	1	2	3					0		11
8	(Australia) Leigh Adams	1	0	2	2			0			11
9	(United States) Greg Hancock	2	2	0	1						8
10	(Poland) Krzysztof Cegielski	1	2	3	3	1	1				8
11	(England) Lee Richardson	2	0	2	1	3	0				7
12	(Sweden) Mikael Max	2	0	2	0						7
13	(Australia) Ryan Sullivan	0	1	1							6
14	(England) Scott Nicholls	2	3	0	1						6
15	(England) Mark Loram	ns	ns	ns							5
16	(Czech Republic) Bohumil Brhel	3	2	1	0						5
17	(Poland) Tomasz Bajerski	3	1	1							4
18	(Poland) Sebastian Ułamek	0	2	1							4
19	(Denmark) Hans Andersen	3	1	0							3
20	(Poland) Rafał Kurmański	1	3	0							3
21	(Denmark) Bjarne Pedersen	1	1								2
22	(Australia) Todd Wiltshire	0	1								2
23	(Australia) Jason Lyons	1	0								1
24	(Sweden) Peter Karlsson	0	0								1

== Heat by heat ==
- Heat 01 Andersen, Richardson, Cegielski, Ulamek
- Heat 02 Brhel, Dryml, Kurmanski, Wiltshire
- Heat 03 Holta, Protasiewicz, Lyons, Karlsson
- Heat 04 Bajerski, Nicholls, B Pedersen, N Pedersen
- Heat 05 N Pedersen, Cegielski, Wiltshire, Lyons
- Heat 06 Kurmanski, Ulamek, B Pedersen, Karlsson
- Heat 07 Nicholls, Dryml, Andersen, Holta
- Heat 08 Protasiewicz, Brhel, Bajerski, Richardson
- Heat 09 Rickardsson, Max, Adams, Loram [NS]
- Heat 10 Gollob, Hancock, Crump, Sullivan
- Heat 11 N Pedersen, Richardson, Ulamek, Andersen
- Heat 12 Cegielski, Holta, Bajerski, Kurmanski
- Heat 13 Rickardsson, Holta, Sullivan, Nicholls
- Heat 14 Protasiewicz, Hancock, Richardson, Adams
- Heat 15 Cegielski, Crump, Dryml, Max
- Heat 16 Gollob, N Pedersen, Brhel, Loram [NS]
- Heat 17 Dryml, Adams, Sullivan, Loram [NS]
- Heat 18 Richardson, Max, Nicholls, Brhel
- Heat 19 Rickardsson, N Pedersen, Cegielski, Hancock
- Heat 20 Crump, Protasiewicz, Holta, Gollob
- Heat 21 Gollob, Dryml, Cegielski, Max
- Heat 22 Holta, Adams, Hancock, Richardson
- Semi Finals
- Heat 23 Rickardsson, Gollob, Protasiewicz, Adams
- Heat 24 N Pedersen, Dryml, Holta, Crump
- Final
- Heat 25 Rickardsson, N Pedersen, Dryml, Gollob
