= 2003 Speedway Grand Prix of Slovenia =

Speedway Grand Prix event

- Venue: Matija Gubec Stadium
- Location: Krško, (Slovenia)
- Start date: 12 July 2003
- Competitors: 24 (2 reserves)

The 2003 Speedway Grand Prix of Slovenia was the fifth round of the 2003 Speedway Grand Prix season (the world championship). It took place on 12 July 2003 at the Matija Gubec Stadium in Krško, Slovenia.

It was the second time that the Speedway Grand Prix of Slovenia had been held.

The Grand Prix was by the Australian rider Leigh Adams (his 2nd career Grand Prix win).

== Grand Prix result ==
Pos.	Rider	1	2	3	4	5	6	SF1	SF2	Final	GP Points
1	(Australia) Leigh Adams	3	3	0	2				2	3	25
2	(Denmark) Nicki Pedersen	0	2	0	2			2		2	20
3	(England) Scott Nicholls	1	2	1	3			3		1	18
4	(Poland) Tomasz Gollob	2	3	2					3	0	16
5	(Sweden) Tony Rickardsson	2	3	1	3				1		13
6	(Poland) Tomasz Bajerski	0	3	2	3	1		1			13
7	(Australia) Jason Crump	3	3	2				0			11
8	(United States) Greg Hancock	1	2	3					0		11
9	(Norway) Rune Holta	0	0	2	1						8
10	(Australia) Ryan Sullivan	3	3	1	2	1					8
11	(England) Mark Loram	2	1	3	1	3	0				7
12	(Sweden) Andreas Jonsson	3	2	1	3	0					7
13	(Sweden) Peter Karlsson	0	2	3	0	1					6
14	(England) David Howe	3	3	0	0						6
15	(Czech Republic) Lukáš Dryml	3	2	0	0						5
16	(Slovenia) Matej Žagar	3	3	0	0						5
17	(Slovenia) Izak Šantej	1	2	1							4
18	(Russia) Roman Povazhny	2	1	1							4
19	(Australia) Jason Lyons	2	0	0							3
20	(Sweden) Mikael Max	1	3	0							3
21	(Poland) Piotr Protasiewicz	1	1								2
22	(Hungary) Sándor Tihanyi	0	1								2
23	(Australia) Todd Wiltshire	0	0								1
24	(Slovenia) Denis Štojs	1	0								1

== Heat by heat ==
- Heat 01 Sullivan, Howe, Santej, Karlsson
- Heat 02 Zagar, Lyons, Stojs, Wiltshire
- Heat 03 Dryml, Loram, Max, Bajerski
- Heat 04 Jonsson, Povazhny, Protasiewicz, Tihanyi
- Heat 05 Max, Santej, Tihanyi, Wiltshire
- Heat 06 Bajerski, Karlsson, Protasiewicz, Stojs
- Heat 07 Sullivan, Dryml, Povazhny, Lyons
- Heat 08 Zagar, Jonsson, Loram, Howe
- Heat 09 Crump, Gollob, Nicholls, Pedersen
- Heat 10 Adams, Rickardsson, Hancock, Holta
- Heat 11 Karlsson, Howe, Povazhny, Max
- Heat 12 Loram, Bajerski, Santej, Lyons
- Heat 13 Bajerski, Crump, Sullivan, Holta
- Heat 14 Rickardsson, Nicholls, Howe, Zagar
- Heat 15 Gollob, Hancock, Loram, Dryml [F/Ex]
- Heat 16 Adams, Pedersen, Jonsson, Karlsson
- Heat 17 Loram, Sullivan, Karlsson, Zagar
- Heat 18 Jonsson, Holta, Howe, Dryml [W]
- Heat 19 Bajerski, Gollob, Nicholls, Pedersen
- Heat 20 Hancock, Crump, Rickardsson, Adams
- Heat 21 Nicholls, Adams, Holta, Loram
- Heat 22 Rickardsson, Pedersen, Sullivan, Jonsson
- Semi Final
- Heat 23 Nicholls, Pedersen, Bajerski, Crump
- Heat 24 Gollob, Adams, Rickardsson, Hancock
- Final
- Heat 25 Adams, Pedersen, Nicholls, Gollob
