= Speedway Grand Prix of Norway =

World speedway championship event

(Norway) FIM PAVA Norwegian Speedway Grand Prix
- Stadium: Vikingskipet Olympic Arena, Hamar
- Years: 3 (2002-2004)
- Track: temporary track
- Track Length: 275 m

Last Event (season 2004)
- Date: 2 October 2004
- Referee: Anthony Steele
- Winner: (Sweden) Tony Rickardsson
- 2nd place: (United States) Greg Hancock
- 3rd place: (Poland) Tomasz Gollob

The Speedway Grand Prix of Norway is a speedway event that was a part of the Speedway Grand Prix Series.

== Winners ==
| | Season | City | Stadium | Winner |
|---|---|---|---|---|---|
| 1 | 2002 | Hamar | Vikingskipet | (Australia) Jason Crump | result |
| 2 | 2003 | Hamar | Vikingskipet | (United States) Greg Hancock | result |
| 3 | 2004 | Hamar | Vikingskipet | (Sweden) Tony Rickardsson | result |
