= 2002 Polish speedway season =

Motorcycle racing competition

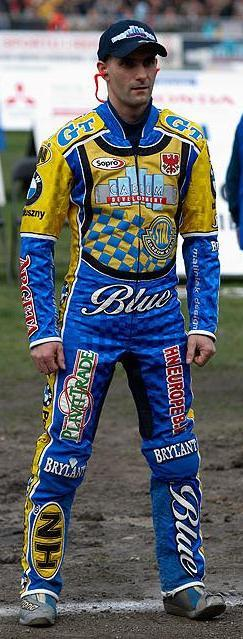
- Tomasz Gollob completed another Polish title/Golden Helmet double

The 2002 Polish Speedway season was the 2002 season of motorcycle speedway in Poland.

== Individual ==
=== Polish Individual Speedway Championship ===
The 2002 Individual Speedway Polish Championship final was held on 15 August at Toruń.

Pos.	Rider	Club	Total	Points
1	Tomasz Gollob	Bydgoszcz	11	(2,3,3,3)
2	Krzysztof Cegielski	Gniezno	10	(1,3,3,3)
3	Jacek Krzyżaniak	Wrocław	10	(3,2,2,3)
4	Piotr Świst	Gorzów Wlkp.	10	(3,2,3,2)
5	Piotr Protasiewicz	Bydgoszcz	8	(3,3,0,2)
6	Rafał Kurmański	Zielona Góra	7	(0,1,3,3)
7	Rafał Dobrucki	Piła	5	(2,1,2,u)
8	Tomasz Bajerski	Toruń	5	(2,w,1,2)
9	Andrzej Huszcza	Zielona Góra	4	(3,1,0,w)
10	Rafał Okoniewski	Leszno	4	(1,3,u,–)
11	Jarosław Hampel	Piła	4	(u,2,2,w)
12	Damian Baliński	Leszno	3	(u,2,1,w)
13	Mariusz Węgrzyk	Rybnik	3	(w,u,2,1)
14	Robert Sawina	Toruń	3	(1,1,0,1)
15	Piotr Winiarz (res)	Rzeszów	3	(1,2,u)
16	Jacek Rempała	Leszno	2	(0,0,1,1)
17	Robert Dados	Wrocław	0	(w,d,w,w)

=== Golden Helmet ===
The 2002 Golden Golden Helmet (Polish: Turniej o Złoty Kask, ZK) organised by the Polish Motor Union (PZM) was the 2002 event for the league's leading riders. The final was held on the 12 October at Bydgoszcz.

Pos.	Rider	Club	Total	Points
1	Tomasz Gollob	Bydgoszcz	14	(3,3,3,3,2)
2	Jacek Gollob	Bydgoszcz	13	(1,3,3,3,3)
3	Piotr Protasiewicz	Bydgoszcz	12	(3,2,2,2,3)
4	Robert Sawina	Toruń	11	(3,1,1,3,3)
5	Sebastian Ułamek	Leszno	11	(2,3,3,2,1)
6	Rafał Okoniewski	Leszno	9	(2,2,2,2,1)
7	Andrzej Huszcza	Zielona Góra	8	(1,2,2,3,0)
8	Wiesław Jaguś	Toruń	7	(1,3,0,1,2)
9	Tomasz Bajerski	Toruń	7	(2,1,1,1,2)
10	Krzysztof Cegielski	Gdańsk	6	(d,d,3,0,3)
11	Robert Dados	Wrocław	6	(3,0,1,1,1)
12	Maciej Kuciapa	Zielona Góra	5	(2,2,d,1,0)
13	Jarosław Łukaszewski	Gniezno	4	(0,0,2,0,2)
14	Jacek Krzyżaniak	Wrocław	4	(1,1,0,2,d)
15	Dariusz Fijałkowski	Warszawa	3	(0,1,1,0,1)
16	Roman Jankowski	Warszawa	0	(0,0,0,d,d)
17	Krzysztof Kasprzak (res)	Leszno	ns	
18	Rafał Kurmański (res)	Zielona Góra	ns	
19	Janusz Ślączka (res)	Krosno	ns	

=== Junior Championship ===
- winner - Artur Bogińczuk

=== Silver Helmet ===
- winner - Krzysztof Kasprzak

=== Bronze Helmet ===
- winner - Robert Umiński

== Pairs ==
=== Polish Pairs Speedway Championship ===
The 2002 Polish Pairs Speedway Championship was the 2002 edition of the Polish Pairs Speedway Championship. The final was held on 28 June at Wrocław.

Pos	Team	Pts	Riders
1	Polonia Bydgoszcz	27	Tomasz Gollob 9, Piotr Protasiewicz 18
2	Apator Toruń	22+3	Robert Sawina 15+3, Tomasz Bajerski
3	Włókniarz Częstochowa	22+2	Artur Pietrzyk 11, Grzegorz Walasek 11+2
4	Unia Leszno	21	Sebastian Ułamek 13, Rafał Okoniewski 8
5	ZKŻ Zielona Góra	12	Andrzej Huszcza 6, Maciej Kuciapa 6
6	Atlas Wrocław	12	Robert Dados 3, Jacek Krzyżaniak 9, Tomasz Jędrzejak 0
7	Stal Gorzów Wlkp.	10	Piotr Świst 8, Piotr Paluch 2

== Team ==
=== Team Speedway Polish Championship ===
The 2002 Team Speedway Polish Championship was the 2002 edition of the Team Polish Championship. Polonia Bydgoszcz won the gold medal.

==== Ekstraliga ====
Pos	Team	P	W	D	L	Pts	Diff
1	Polonia Bydgoszcz	20	15	0	5	30	206
2	Unia Leszno	20	14	1	5	29	199
3	Atlas Wrocław	20	12	1	7	25	126
4	Włókniarz Częstochowa	20	9	0	11	18	-33
5	Apator Toruń	20	11	1	8	23	146
6	Polonia Piła	20	7	2	11	16	-25
7	Wybrzeże Gdańsk	20	5	2	13	12	-291
8	Stal Gorzów Wielkopolski	20	3	1	16	7	-328

==== 1.Liga ====
Pos	Team	P	W	D	L	Diff	Pts
1	ZKŻ Zielona Góra	20	17	0	3	363	34
2	Start Gniezno	20	15	0	5	181	30
3	RKM Rybnik	20	13	0	7	167	26
4	Stal Rzeszów	20	8	0	12	-115	16
5	Unia Tarnów	20	8	1	11	-11	17
6	Kolejarz Rawicz	20	8	0	12	-10	16
7	Kolejarz Opole	20	7	1	12	86	15
8	GKM Grudziądz	20	3	0	17	-489	6

==== 2.Liga ====
Pos	Team	P	W	D	L	Diff	Pts
1	TŻ Lublin	12	10	0	2	205	20
2	WKM Warszawa	12	9	0	3	169	18
3	TŻ Łódź	12	7	0	5	–11	14
4	Iskra Ostrów	12	7	0	5	33	14
5	KSŻ Krosno	12	6	0	6	53	12
6	Wanda Kraków	12	3	0	9	–132	6
7	Śląsk Świętochłowice	12	0	0	12	–317	0

==== Promotion/relegation play offs ====
- Gniezno - Gdańsk 49–41, 35–48
- Warszawa - Opole 62–26, 38-52
