= 2003 Speedway Grand Prix =

World speedway championship season

Season details
- Dates: 17 May - 4 October
- Events: 9
- Cities: 9
- Countries: 7
- Riders: 22 permanents 2 wild card(s)
- Heats: 225 + 3 canceled (in 9 events)

Winners
- Champion: DEN Nicki Pedersen
- Runner-up: AUS Jason Crump
- 3rd place: SWE Tony Rickardsson

The 2003 Speedway Grand Prix was the 58th edition of the official World Championship and the ninth season in the Speedway Grand Prix era used to determine the Speedway World Champion. The world title was won by Nicki Pedersen of Denmark.

== Event format ==
The system first used in 1998 continued to be adopted with 24 riders, divided into two classes. The eight best would be directly qualified for the "Main Event", while the sixteen others would be knocked out if they finished out of the top two in 4-man heats on two occasions - while they would go through if they finished inside the top two on two occasions. This resulted in 10 heats, where eight proceeded to the Main Event, where exactly the same system was applied to give eight riders to a semi-final.

The semi-finals were then two heats of four, where the top two qualified for a final - there was no consolation final. The 4 finalists scored 25, 20, 18 and 16 points, with 5th and 6th place getting 13, 7th and 8th 11, and after that 8, 8, 7, 7, etc. Places after 8th place were awarded according to the time a rider was knocked out and, secondly, according to position in the last heat he rode in.

== Qualification for Grand Prix ==
The 2003 season had 22 permanent riders and two wild cards at each event. The permanent riders are highlighted in the results table below.

== 2003 event schedule and winners ==
Calendar

| Date | Grand Prix | Venue | Winner | Result |
|---|---|---|---|---|
| 17 May | Europe | Stadion Śląski, Chorzów | Tony Rickardsson (Sweden) | 2003 European GP |
| 31 May | Sweden | Stadion Brovalla, Avesta | Ryan Sullivan (Australia) | 2003 Swedish GP |
| 14 June | (United Kingdom) Great Britain | Millennium Stadium, Cardiff | Nicki Pedersen (Denmark) | 2003 British GP |
| 28 June | Denmark | Parken Stadium, Copenhagen | Jason Crump (Australia) | 2003 Danish GP |
| 12 July | Slovenia | Matija Gubec Stadium, Krško | Leigh Adams (Australia) | 2003 Slovenian GP |
| 30 August | (Kalmar Union) Scandinavia | Ullevi, Gothenburg | Ryan Sullivan (Australia) | 2003 Scandinavian GP |
| 6 September | Czech Republic | Markéta Stadium, Prague | Jason Crump (Australia) | 2003 Czech Republic GP |
| 20 September | Poland | Polonia Stadium, Bydgoszcz | Tomasz Gollob (Poland) | 2003 Polish GP |
| 4 October | Norway | Vikingskipet, Hamar | Greg Hancock (United States) | 2003 Norwegian GP |

Final 2003 standings

| Pos | Rider | Total | EUR | SWE | GBR | DEN | SVN | SCA | CZE | POL | NOR |
|---|---|---|---|---|---|---|---|---|---|---|---|
| 1 | (Denmark) Nicki Pedersen | 152 | 20 | 8 | 25 | 16 | 20 | 7 | 18 | 18 | 20 |
| 2 | (Australia) Jason Crump | 144 | 11 | 5 | 20 | 25 | 11 | 16 | 25 | 20 | 11 |
| 3 | (Sweden) Tony Rickardsson | 127 | 25 | 13 | 18 | 20 | 13 | 6 | 20 | 6 | 6 |
| 4 | (Australia) Leigh Adams | 126 | 11 | 18 | 13 | 11 | 25 | 18 | 11 | 11 | 8 |
| 5 | (United States) Greg Hancock | 121 | 8 | 16 | 16 | 18 | 11 | 13 | 6 | 8 | 25 |
| 6 | (Poland) Tomasz Gollob | 111 | 16 | 8 | 3 | 13 | 16 | 11 | 8 | 25 | 11 |
| 7 | (England) Scott Nicholls | 102 | 6 | 2 | 13 | 11 | 18 | 20 | 6 | 13 | 13 |
| 8 | (Norway) / (Poland) Rune Holta | 98 | 13 | 11 | 11 | 13 | 8 | 5 | 16 | 8 | 13 |
| 9 | (Australia) Ryan Sullivan | 94 | 6 | 25 | 7 | 8 | 8 | 25 | 5 | 3 | 7 |
| 10 | (Sweden) Andreas Jonsson | 76 | - | 2 | 11 | 7 | 7 | 13 | 13 | 7 | 16 |
| 11 | (Poland) Piotr Protasiewicz | 63 | 13 | 6 | 8 | 6 | 2 | 3 | 4 | 16 | 5 |
| 12 | (Czech Republic) Lukáš Dryml | 58 | 18 | 20 | 8 | 7 | 5 | - | - | - | - |
| 13 | (Sweden) Mikael Max | 52 | 7 | 13 | 5 | 1 | 3 | 8 | 7 | 5 | 3 |
| 14 | (Denmark) Bjarne Pedersen | 51 | 2 | 7 | 4 | 5 | - | 3 | 8 | 4 | 18 |
| 15 | (Poland) Tomasz Bajerski | 51 | 4 | 11 | 7 | 6 | 13 | 5 | 2 | 1 | 2 |
| 16 | (England) Lee Richardson | 45 | 7 | 1 | 4 | - | - | 8 | 7 | 11 | 7 |
| 17 | (Denmark) Hans Andersen | 41 | 3 | 4 | - | - | - | 11 | 11 | 6 | 6 |
| 18 | (England) Mark Loram | 32 | 5 | - | - | - | 7 | 4 | 4 | 7 | 5 |
| 19 | (Australia) Todd Wiltshire | 30 | 2 | 5 | 5 | 2 | 1 | 6 | 3 | 3 | 3 |
| 20 | (Australia) Jason Lyons | 29 | 1 | 6 | 2 | 8 | 3 | 2 | 1 | 2 | 4 |
| 21 | (Sweden) Peter Karlsson | 28 | 1 | 3 | 6 | 4 | 6 | - | 2 | 4 | 2 |
| 22 | (Czech Republic) Bohumil Brhel | 26 | 5 | 3 | 1 | 5 | - | 1 | 5 | 5 | 1 |
| 23 | (Denmark) Ronni Pedersen | 23 | - | 4 | 6 | 3 | - | 1 | - | 1 | 8 |
| 24 | (Poland) Krzysztof Cegielski | 15 | 8 | 7 | - | - | - | - | - | - | - |
| 25 | (Poland) Jarosław Hampel | 13 | - | - | - | - | - | - | - | 13 | - |
| 26 | (Czech Republic) Tomáš Topinka | 13 | - | - | - | - | - | - | 13 | - | - |
| 27 | (England) David Howe | 8 | - | - | 2 | - | 6 | - | - | - | - |
| 28 | (Sweden) Peter Ljung | 7 | - | - | - | - | - | 7 | - | - | - |
| 29 | (Russia) Roman Povazhny | 6 | - | - | - | 2 | 4 | - | - | - | - |
| 30 | (Slovenia) Matej Žagar | 5 | - | - | - | - | 5 | - | - | - | - |
| 31 | (Norway) Lars Gunnestad | 4 | - | - | - | - | - | - | - | - | 4 |
| 32 | (Sweden) David Ruud | 4 | - | - | - | - | - | 4 | - | - | - |
| 33 | (Denmark) Charlie Gjedde | 4 | - | - | - | 4 | - | - | - | - | - |
| 34 | (Poland) Sebastian Ułamek | 4 | 4 | - | - | - | - | - | - | - | - |
| 35 | (Slovenia) Izak Šantej | 4 | - | - | - | - | 4 | - | - | - | - |
| 36 | (Czech Republic) Aleš Dryml, Jr. | 3 | - | - | - | - | - | - | 3 | - | - |
| 37 | (Poland) Rafał Kurmański | 3 | 3 | - | - | - | - | - | - | - | - |
| 38 | (England) Simon Stead | 3 | - | - | 3 | - | - | - | - | - | - |
| 39 | (Poland) Robert Dados | 3 | - | - | - | 3 | - | - | - | - | - |
| 40 | (Finland) Joonas Kylmäkorpi | 3 | - | - | - | - | - | 2 | - | - | 1 |
| 41 | (Poland) Rafał Szombierski | 2 | - | - | - | - | - | - | - | 2 | - |
| 42 | (Hungary) Sándor Tihanyi | 2 | - | - | - | - | 2 | - | - | - | - |
| 43 | (Denmark) Jesper B. Jensen | 1 | - | - | - | 1 | - | - | - | - | - |
| 44 | (Sweden) Magnus Zetterström | 1 | - | 1 | - | - | - | - | - | - | - |
| 45 | (Czech Republic) Josef Franc | 1 | - | - | - | - | - | - | 1 | - | - |
| 46 | (England) Chris Harris | 1 | - | - | 1 | - | - | - | - | - | - |
| 47 | (Slovenia) Denis Štojs | 1 | - | - | - | - | 1 | - | - | - | - |
