= List of Speedway Grand Prix riders =

This is a complete list of riders who have entered a FIM Speedway Grand Prix since 1995.

After 2015 Scandinavian SGP in Stockholm (26 September 2015)

== A ==
- (Australia) Leigh Adams
- (Hungary) Zoltán Adorján
- (Sweden) Sebastian Aldén
- (Italy) Stefano Alfonso
- (Denmark) Brian Andersen
- (Denmark) Hans N. Andersen
- (Sweden) Dennis Andersson
- (Sweden) Eric Andersson
- (Sweden) Stefan Andersson

(back to index)

== B ==
- (Poland) Tomasz Bajerski
- (Poland) Damian Balinski
- (Germany) Robert Barth
- (Australia) Troy Batchelor
- (United States) Luke Becker
- (United Kingdom) Daniel Bewley
- (Denmark) Kenneth Bjerre
- (Denmark) Lasse Bjerre
- (Latvia) Maksims Bogdanovs
- (Australia) Craig Boyce
- (Czech Republic) Bohumil Brhel
- (Poland) Krzysztof Buczkowski
- (New Zealand) Jason Bunyan

(back to index)

== C ==
- (Italy) Mattia Carpanese
- (Italy) Armando Castagna
- (Poland) Krzysztof Cegielski
- (Poland) Tomasz Chrzanowski
- (Denmark) Hans Clausen
- (Slovenia) Aleksander Conda
- (United Kingdom) Craig Cook
- (Italy) Nicolas Covatti
- (United Kingdom) Marvyn Cox
- (Australia) Jason Crump
- (Poland) Adrian Cyfer

(back to index)

== D ==
- (Poland) Robert Dados (1977-2004)
- (Sweden) Stefan Dannö
- (Sweden) Jonas Davidsson
- (Poland) Rafał Dobrucki
- (Australia) Jason Doyle
- (Poland) Sławomir Drabik
- (Czech Republic) Aleš Dryml Jr.
- (Czech Republic) Lukáš Dryml
- (United Kingdom) Martin Dugard
- (Slovenia) Matija Duh (1989-2013)

(back to index)

== E ==
- (Sweden) Freddie Eriksson
- (United States) Sam Ermolenko

(back to index)

== F ==
- (Slovenia) Matej Ferjan (1977-2011)
- (Norway) Arnt Førland
- (Sweden) Billy Forsberg
- (Czech Republic) Josef Franc
- (Italy) Guglielmo Franchetti

(back to index)

== G ==
- (Poland) Tomasz Gapiński
- (United Kingdom) Jason Garrity
- (Denmark) Charlie Gjedde
- (Poland) Jacek Gollob
- (Poland) Tomasz Gollob
- (Norway) Lars Gunnestad
- (Sweden) Henrik Gustafsson
- (Sweden) Simon Gustafsson

(back to index)

== H ==
- (United States) Billy Hamill
- (Poland) Jarosław Hampel
- (United States) Greg Hancock
- (United Kingdom) Chris Harris
- (United Kingdom) Gary Havelock
- (Germany) Christian Hefenbrock
- (Hungary) Csaba Hell
- (Australia) Chris Holder
- (Norway) (Poland) Rune Holta
- (United Kingdom) David Howe

(back to index)

== I ==
- (Denmark) Niels Kristian Iversen
- (Slovenia) Matic Ivačič

(back to index)

== J ==
- (Poland) Wiesław Jaguś
- (Poland) Maciej Janowski
- (Denmark) Jesper B. Jensen - see Jesper B. Monberg
- (Denmark) Mikkel B. Jensen
- (Denmark) Michael Jepsen Jensen
- (Czech Republic) Marian Jirout
- (Australia) Steve Johnston
- (Sweden) Thomas H. Jonasson
- (Sweden) Andreas Jonsson
- (Denmark) John Jørgensen

(back to index)

== K ==
- (Poland) Łukasz Kaczmarek
- (Denmark) Brian Karger
- (Sweden) Mikael Karlsson - see Mikael Max
- (Sweden) Peter Karlsson
- (Czech Republic) Antonín Kasper Jr. (1962-2006)
- (Poland) Krzysztof Kasprzak
- (United Kingdom) Edward Kennett
- (Denmark) Peter Kildemand
- (Denmark) Nicolai Klindt
- (Sweden) Niklas Klingberg
- (Denmark) Tommy Knudsen
- (Poland) Janusz Kołodziej
- (Poland) Andrzej Korolew
- (Croatia) Dino Kovacic
- (Poland) Jacek Krzyżaniak
- (Poland) Rafał Kurmański (1982-2004)
- (Czech Republic) Matěj Kůs
- (Sweden) Joonas Kylmäkorpi

(back to index)

== L ==
- (Russia) (Latvia) Grigory Laguta
- (Russia) Artem Laguta
- (Finland) Timo Lahti
- (United Kingdom) Robert Lambert
- (United States) Josh Larsen
- (Finland) Kai Laukkanen
- (Latvia) Andžejs Ļebedevs
- (Austria) Franz Leitner
- (Sweden) Fredrik Lindgren
- (Sweden) Ludvig Lindgren
- (Sweden) Antonio Lindbäck
- (Sweden) Peter Ljung
- (United Kingdom) Mark Loram
- (United Kingdom) Chris Louis
- (Finland) Nike Lunna
- (Australia) Jason Lyons

(back to index)

== M ==
- (Denmark) Leon Madsen
- (Czech Republic) Michal Makovský
- (Sweden) Mikael Max
- (Poland) Adrian Miedziński
- (Denmark) Mikkel Michelsen
- (Italy) Alessandro Milanese
- (Czech Republic) Václav Milík Jr.
- (Italy) Christian Miotello
- (Denmark) Jesper B. Monberg
- (Poland) Artur Mroczka

(back to index)

== N ==
- (Sweden) Peter Nahlin
- (United Kingdom) Scott Nicholls
- (Denmark) Hans Nielsen
- (Finland) Jiri Nieminen
- (Finland) Kauko Nieminen
- (Sweden) Jimmy Nilsen
- (United Kingdom) David Norris

(back to index)

== O ==
(back to index)

== P ==
- (Croatia) Jurica Pavlic
- (Poland) Piotr Pawlicki Jr.
- (Poland) Przemyslaw Pawlicki
- (Denmark) Bjarne Pedersen
- (Denmark) Nicki Pedersen
- (Denmark) Ronni Pedersen
- (Australia) Mick Poole
- (Latvia) Kjasts Puodžuks
- (Russia) Roman Povazhny
- (Poland) Piotr Protasiewicz
- (Poland) Paweł Przedpełski

(back to index)

== R ==
- (United Kingdom) Lee Richardson (1979-2012)
- (Sweden) Tony Rickardsson
- (Denmark) Morten Risager
- (Germany) Gerd Riss
- (Sweden) David Ruud
- (Czech Republic) Adrian Rymel

(back to index)

== S ==
- (Russia) Emil Sayfutdinov
- (Slovenia) Izak Šantej
- (United Kingdom) Joe Screen
- (Czech Republic) Zdeněk Simota
- (Slovenia) Nick Škorja
- (Poland) Dariusz Śledź
- (United Kingdom) Andy Smith
- (Germany) Martin Smolinski
- (Norway) Rune Sola
- (Denmark) Jan Stæchmann
- (United Kingdom) Simon Stead
- (Slovenia) Denis Štojs
- (United Kingdom) Carl Stonehewer
- (Australia) Ryan Sullivan
- (Sweden) Linus Sundström
- (Czech Republic) Antonín Šváb Jr.
- (Poland) Rafał Szombierski

(back to index)

== T ==
- (Italy) Simone Terenzani
- (Italy) Daniele Tessari
- (Denmark) Anders Thomsen
- (Hungary) Sándor Tihanyi
- (Czech Republic) Luboš Tomíček Jr.
- (Czech Republic) Tomáš Topinka

(back to index)

== U ==
- (Poland) Sebastian Ułamek

(back to index)

== V ==
- (Slovakia) Martin Vaculík

(back to index)

== W ==
- (Poland) Grzegorz Walasek
- (Australia) Darcy Ward
- (Australia) Davey Watt
- (United Kingdom) Simon Wigg (1960-2000)
- (Australia) Todd Wiltshire
- (United Kingdom) Tai Woffinden
- (Germany) Mirko Wolter

(back to index)

== Z ==
- (Slovenia) Matej Žagar
- (Poland) Grzegorz Zengota
- (Sweden) Magnus Zetterström
- (Poland) Bartosz Zmarzlik

(back to index)
