= Rafał Kurmański =

Polish speedway rider (1982–2004)

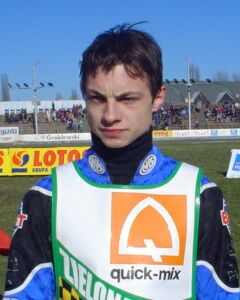
- Born: 22 August 1982; Poland
- Died: 30 May 2004 (aged 21); Zielona Góra, Poland
- Nationality: Polish

Career history

Poland
- 1999–2004: Zielona Góra

Great Britain
- 2004: Swindon Robins

Sweden
- 2003: Valsarna

Individual honours
- 2001 - 2nd place: U-19 European Championship

Team honours
- 2001: Polish Pairs U-21 Champion

Rafał Kurmański ['rafaw kurˈmaɲskʲi] (22 August 1982 – 30 May 2004) was a Polish speedway rider. He earned one international caps for the Poland national speedway team.

== Career ==
Kurmański started his speedway career with Zielona Góra during the 1999 Polish speedway season. He would remain with the club for all six seasons of his short career.

In 2001, Kurmański was second in the 2001 Individual Under-19 European Championship.

Kurmański rode for Swindon Robins in the British speedway leagues, participating in the 2004 Elite League speedway season.

In 2004, Kurmański took his own life.

== World Championship results ==
=== Speedway Grand Prix results ===
2003 Speedway Grand Prix Final Championship standings (Riding No 23)
Race no.	Grand Prix	Pos.	Pts.	Heats	Draw No
1 /9	(Europe) European SGP	20	3	(1,3,0)	23

permanent speedway rider
wild card, track reserve or qualified reserve
rider not classified (track reserve who did not start)

=== Individual World Championship ===
- 2003 - 36th place (3 points)

=== Individual World U-21 Championship ===
- 2002 - 6th place (10 points)
- 2003 - 7th place (8 points)

== Other results ==
Individual U-19 European Championship

- 2001 - Runner-up (13 points)

Individual Polish Championship

- 2001 - 15th place in Semi-Final
- 2002 - 6th place (7 points)

Polish U-21 Pairs Championship

- 2001 - Polish Champion
- 2002 - 2nd place

Team U-21 Polish Championship

- 2000 - 3rd place
- 2003 - 3rd place

Silver Helmet (U-21)

- 2002 - 2nd place

== See also ==
- List of Speedway Grand Prix riders
- List of suicides (A–M)
