= 2002 Individual Speedway European Championship =

Motorcycle racing competition

Seasons
- ← 2001 2003 →

The 2002 Individual Speedway European Championship

== Qualification ==
- Semi-Final A:
  - August 11, 2002
  - (Slovenia) Lendava
- Semi-Final B:
  - May 18, 2002
  - (Italy) Terenzano
- Scandinavian Final (Semi-Final C):
  - June 7, 2002
  - (Sweden) Hagfors

== Final ==
- September 7, 2002
- (Poland) Rybnik

Placing	Rider	Total	1	2	3	4	5	6	7	8	9	10	11	12	13	14	15	16	17	18	19	20	Pts	Pos	21	22
1	(Sweden) (4) Magnus Zetterström	12	E							3				3				3				3	12	1		3
2	(Poland) (6) Krzysztof Kasprzak	12		2				3			3							1			3		12	2		2
3	(Poland) (2) Rafał Szombierski	11	2					1				3				3				2			11	3	3	
4	(Denmark) (12) Jesper B. Jensen	11			2					2		2			3						2		11	4	2	
5	(Czech Republic) (1) Bohumil Brhel	10	1				3				2				1				3				10	5		
6	(Russia) (16) Roman Povazhny	9				3				0	0						3			3			9	6		
7	(Denmark) (8) Ronni Pedersen	9		1						1			3			2			2				9	7		
8	(Norway) (5) Lars Gunnestad	7		3			X					0					2					2	7	8		
9	(Sweden) (7) David Ruud	7		0					3					2	2					X			7	9		
10	(Poland) (3) Mariusz Węgrzyk	6	3						0				2				1				X		6	10		
11	(Germany) (13) Joachim Kugelmann	6				1	2							1		1					1		6	11		
12	(Hungary) (9) Laszlo Szatmari	6			1		1						1					2		1			6	12		
13	(Hungary) (10) Sandor Tihanyi	5			3			2						0			0		0				5	13		
14	(Czech Republic) (15) Josef Franc	5				2			1			1						0	1				5	14		
15	(Slovenia) (11) Matej Žagar	4			0				2		1					0						1	4	15		
16	(Ukraine) (14) Oleksandr Lyatosinsky	0				0		0					0		0							0	0	16		
	(R1) None	0																					0			
	(R1) None	0																					0			
Placing	Rider	Total	1	2	3	4	5	6	7	8	9	10	11	12	13	14	15	16	17	18	19	20	Pts	Pos	21	22

m - exclusion for exceeding two minute time allowance • t - exclusion for touching the tapes • x - other exclusion • e - retired or mechanical failure • f - fell • ns - non-starter • nc - non-classify

gate A - inside	gate B	gate C	gate D - outside
