= Roman Povazhny =

Russian-Polish speedway rider

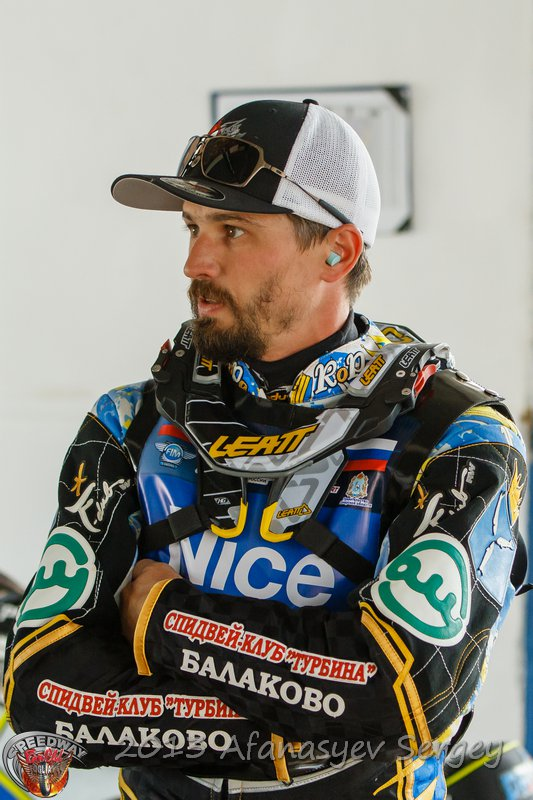
- Born: October 23, 1976 (age 50); Tolyatti, Soviet Union
- Nationality: Russian

Career history

Russia
- 1993–2006: Togliatti
- 2007–2013: Balakovo

Poland
- 1998: Krosno
- 1999: Gorzów
- 2001: Warszawa
- 2002: Grudziądz
- 2003–2007: Rybnik
- 2008: Rzeszów
- 2009–2013: Daugavpils

Sweden
- 2008: Indianerna

Great Britain
- 1999, 2001, 2004, 2007: Eastbourne
- 2000: Oxford
- 2000: Wolverhampton
- 2002: King's Lynn
- 2004–2005: Arena Essex

Denmark
- 2004: Kronjylland

Individual honours
- 2001: Russian champion

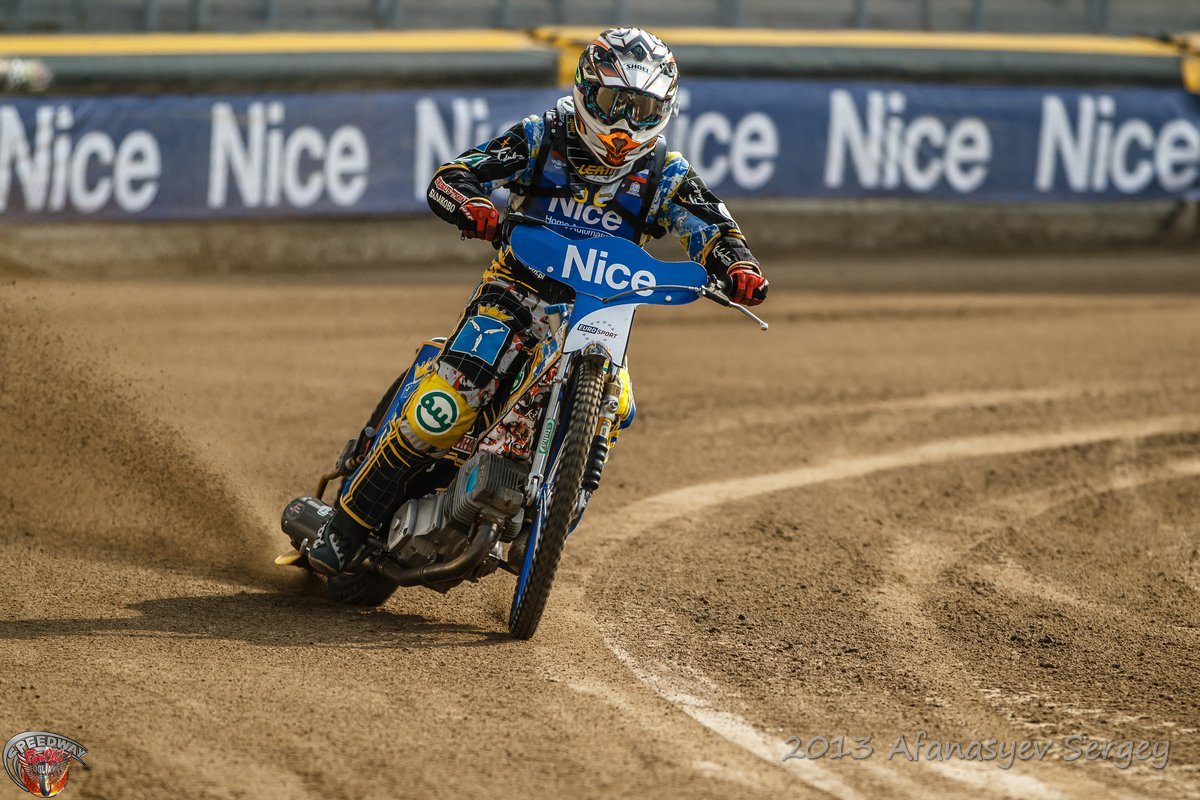

Roman Alexandrovich Povazhny (Russian: Поважный, Роман Александрович; born October 23, 1976) is a former international motorcycle speedway rider and a former champion of Russia. He earned 21 caps for the Russia national speedway team.

== Career ==
Povazhny won the Russian national championship in 2001.

Povazhny started his British leagues career with Eastbourne Eagles and would ride with them for four seasons in 1999, 2001, 2004 and 2007. In between, he rode for Oxford Cheetahs during the 2000 season.

Povazhny gained Polish citizenship in 2004 and retired in 2013.

== Speedway Grand Prix results ==
2003 Speedway Grand Prix Final Championship standings (Riding No 29)
Race no.	Grand Prix	Pos.	Pts.	Heats	Draw No
4 /9	(Denmark) Danish SGP	22	2	(1,1/Fx)	22
5 /9	(Slovenia) Slovenian SGP	18	4	(2,1,1)	21

2005 Speedway Grand Prix Final Championship standings (Riding No 23)
Race no.	Grand Prix	Pos.	Pts.	Heats	Draw No
9 /9	(Italy) Italian SGP	15	4	(0,1,0,0,3)	12

permanent speedway rider
wild card, track reserve or qualified reserve
rider not classified (track reserve who did not start)

== Career details ==
=== World Championships ===
- Individual World Championship (Speedway Grand Prix)
  - 2003 - 29th place (6 points in 2 GPs)
  - 2005 - 25th place (4 points in 1 GP)
- Individual Under-21 World Championship
  - 1997 - (Czech Republic) Mšeno - 4th place (10 points)
- Team World Championship (Speedway World Team Cup and Speedway World Cup)
  - 1993 - 3rd place in Group D for (13 points)
  - 1993 - started in Group B only (4 points)
  - 1997 - (Poland) Piła - 6th place (7 points)
  - 1998 - 3rd place in Group A (12 points)
  - 2000 - 3rd place in Quarter-Final 1 (13 points)
  - 2001 - 8th place (5 points in Race-Off)
  - 2002 - 9th place (8 points in Event 3)
  - 2003 - 8th place (8 points in Race-Off)
  - 2007 - started in Qualifying Round 2 only (12 points)

Note: In 1993 he started for Slovenia

=== European Championships ===
- Individual European Championship
  - 2001 - (Belgium) Heusden Zolder - 7th place (8 points)
  - 2002 - (Poland) Rybnik - 6th place (9 points)
- European Pairs Championship
  - 2008 - (Austria) Natschbach-Loipersbach - Bronze medal (8 points)
- European Club Champions' Cup
  - 1998 - started in Group A only (15 points)
  - 2004 - (Slovenia) Ljubljana - Silver medal for Mega-Lada Togliatti (16 points)
  - 2009 - (Poland) Toruń - 3rd place (5 pts) Vladivostok

=== Domestic competitions ===
- Individual Polish Championship
  - 2008 - 6th place in Semi-Final 2
- Polish Golden Helmet
  - 2008 - (Poland) Wrocław - 5th place (8 points)

== See also ==
- Russia national speedway team
- Poland national speedway team
- List of Speedway Grand Prix riders
- Speedway in Poland
