= Piotr Protasiewicz =

Polish speedway rider (born 1975)

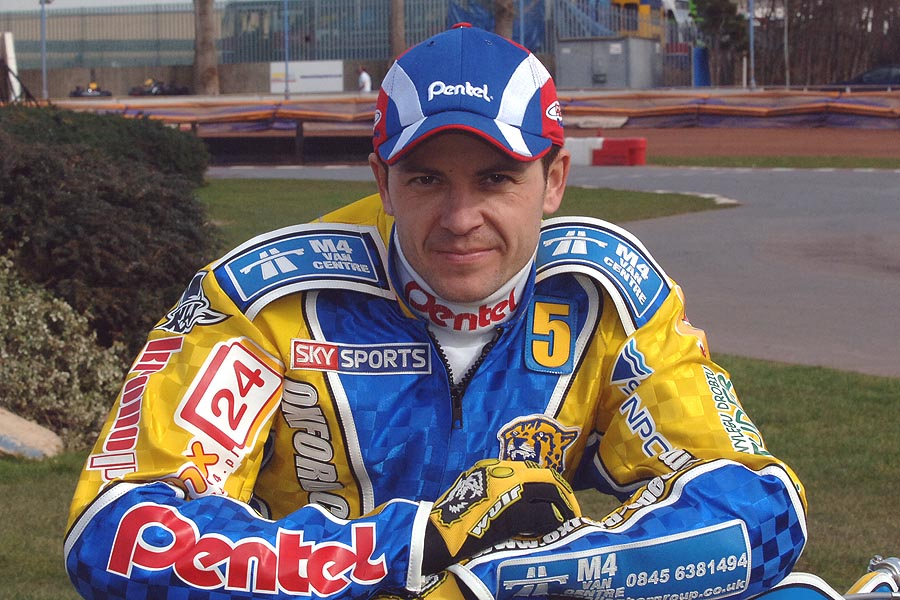
- Protasiewicz in 2007
- Born: 25 January 1975 (age 51); Zielona Góra, Poland
- Nationality: Polish

Career history

Poland
- 1991–1994, 2007–2022: Zielona Góra
- 1995–1996: Wrocław
- 1997–2002, 2005–2006: Bydgoszcz
- 2003–2004: Toruń

Great Britain
- 1998: King's Lynn
- 2002–2003: Peterborough
- 2005–2006: Ipswich
- 2007: Oxford

Sweden
- 1999: Filbyterna
- 2000–2019: Indianerna

Denmark
- 2008: Outrup
- 2009–2011, 2016–2017: Esbjerg
- 2021: Region Varde

Individual honours
- 1997, 2003: GP Challenge winner
- 1999: Polish champion

Team honours
- 1996, 2005, 2009, 2011: World Cup winner

Piotr Protasiewicz ['piɔtr prɔtaˈsiɛvit͡sz] (born 25 January 1975 in Zielona Góra, Poland) is a Polish international speedway rider. He is a four times World team champion and earned 24 international caps for the Poland national speedway team.

== Career ==
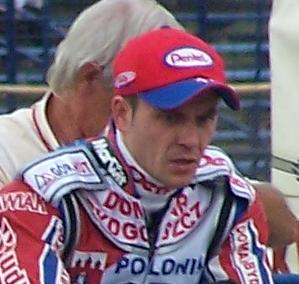
Piotr Protasiewicz (2006 as Polonia Bydgoszcz's captain)

Protasiewicz began his career riding for Falubaz Zielona Góra in 1991, where he would spend four seasons. He began to record some notable performances including reaching the finals of three Speedway Under-21 World Championship in 1993, 1995 and 1996. In the 1996 final, he scored a perfect 15 point maximum to be crowned the World U21 champion.

Protasiewicz rode for the Polish national team in the 1996 Speedway World Cup and in October 1997, during the Speedway Grand Prix Qualification he won the GP Challenge, which ensured that he claimed a permanent slot for the 1998 Grand Prix. He would repeat this feat three years later in October 2003.

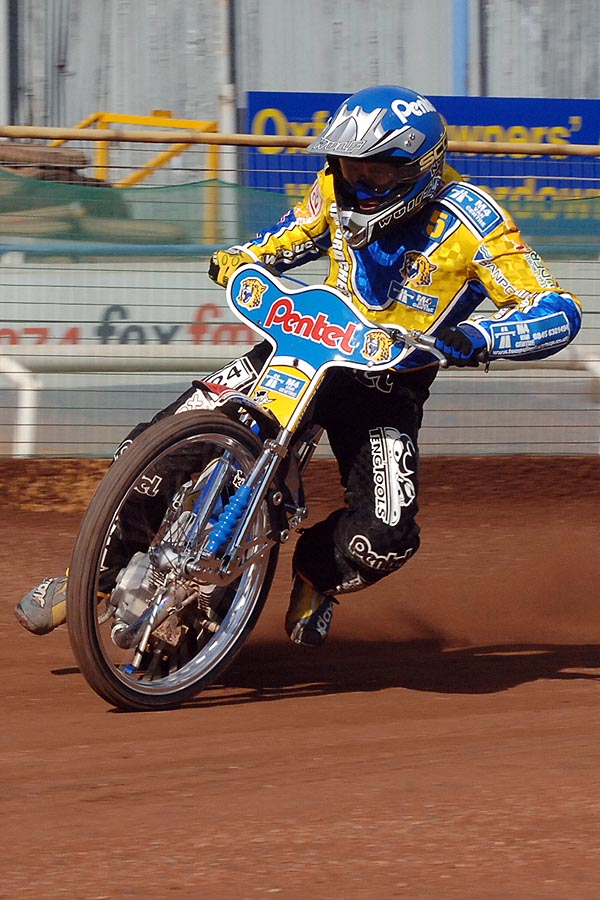
Protasiewicz riding for Oxford

Protasiewicz made his British league debut in 1998 for the King's Lynn Stars and would spend two seasons with the Peterborough Panthers and two seasons with the Ipswich Witches before a final season with Oxford Cheetahs in 2007. He won a second World Cup gold medal for Poland in the 2005.

In total, Protasiewicz rode in 12 Speedway Grand Prix series, the laste bing the 2010 Speedway Grand Prix. He won his third and fourth Speedway World Cup gold medals at the 2009 Speedway World Cup, 2011 Speedway World Cup.

Protasiewicz spent several seasons with Polonia Bydgoszcz before returning to his first club Zielona Góra. In 2022, he started his 16th consecutive season with the club.

== Awards ==
For his sport achievements, Protasiewicz received the Silver Cross of Merit in 2000.

== Personal life ==
Protasiewicz married his girlfriend Katarzyna on 25 October 2002. They have two children. His father, Paweł was a speedway rider too.

== Speedway Grand Prix results ==
1996 Speedway Grand Prix Final Championship standings (Riding No 16)
Race no.	Grand Prix	Pos.	Pts.	Heats	Draw No
6 /6	(Denmark) SGP	14th	3	(2,2,E,F,0) +2D	14

1997 Speedway Grand Prix Final Championship standings (Riding No 15)
Race no.	Grand Prix	Pos.	Pts.	Heats	Draw No
1 /6	(Czech Republic) Czech Rep. SGP	16th	1	(3,0,1,0,0) +0D	1
2 /6	(Sweden) Swedish SGP	18th	-	-	18
3 /6	(Germany) SGP	8th	11	(3,3,1,0,0) +0B	13
4 /6	(United Kingdom) British SGP	17th	0	(0)	17
5 /6	(Poland) Polish SGP	4th	18	(2,3,3,1,2) +0A	5
6 /6	(Denmark) SGP	14th	3	(0,2,1,0,0) +2D	10

1998 Speedway Grand Prix Final Championship standings (Riding No 13)
Race no.	Grand Prix	Pos.	Pts.	Heats	Draw No
1 /6	(Czech Republic) Czech Rep. SGP	21st	2	(0,1)	13
2 /6	(Germany) SGP	23rd	1	(1,0)	18
3 /6	(Denmark) SGP	15th	5	(0,3,2) (0,0)	20
4 /6	(United Kingdom) British SGP	21st	2	(0,1)	13
5 /6	(Sweden) Swedish SGP	19th	3	(3,1,0)	19
6 /6	(Poland) Polish SGP	20th	3	(2,0,0)	18

1999 Speedway Grand Prix Final Championship standings (Riding No 24)
Race no.	Grand Prix	Pos.	Pts.	Heats	Draw No
1 /6	(Czech Republic) Czech Rep. SGP	24th	1	(0,0)	24
5 /6	(Poland) Polish II SGP	24th	1	(0,0)	24

2000 Speedway Grand Prix Final Championship standings (Riding No 23)
Race no.	Grand Prix	Pos.	Pts.	Heats	Draw No
3 /6	(Poland) Polish SGP	22nd	2	(X,1)	23
6 /6	(Europe) European SGP	24th	1	(0,0)	23

2001 Speedway Grand Prix Final Championship standings (Riding No 16)
Race no.	Grand Prix	Pos.	Pts.	Heats	Draw No
1 /6	(Germany) SGP	17th	4	(2,0,1)	16
2 /6	(United Kingdom) British SGP	14th	6	(1,2,2) (1,1)	15
3 /6	(Denmark) SGP	23rd	1	(0,0)	14
4 /6	(Czech Republic) Czech Rep. SGP	16th	5	(0,2,2) (0,0)	19
5 /6	(Poland) Polish SGP	21st	2	(1,1)	14
6 /6	(Sweden) Swedish SGP	21st	2	(0,1)	18

2002 Speedway Grand Prix Final Championship standings (Riding No 23) (26)
Race no.	Grand Prix	Pos.	Pts.	Heats	Draw No
2 /10	(Poland) Polish SGP	12th	7	(2,2) (1,3,0)	23
5 /10	(Sweden) Swedish SGP	18th	4	(1,3,1)	17
8 /10	(Europe) European SGP	24th	1	(1,0)	18
9 /10	(Denmark) SGP	14th	6	(0) (0,1)	6

2003 Speedway Grand Prix Final Championship standings (Riding No 19)
Race no.	Grand Prix	Pos.	Pts.	Heats	Draw No
1 /9	(Europe) European SGP	6th	13	(2,3) (3,2) +1	19
2 /9	(Sweden) Swedish SGP	13th	6	(1) (1,1)	6
3 /9	(United Kingdom) British SGP	10th	8	(1,2,2) (2,1,1)	13
4 /9	(Denmark) SGP	13th	6	(3,3) (1,1)	10
5 /9	(Slovenia) Slovenian SGP	21st	2	(1,1)	13
6 /9	(Sweden) Scandinavian SGP	19th	3	(1,2,0)	16
7 /9	(Czech Republic) Czech Rep. SGP	18th	4	(1,2,1)	18
8 /9	(Poland) Polish SGP	4th	16	(2,0,3) (2,2) +2 +0	18
9 /9	(Norway) Norwegian SGP	16th	5	(3) (1,0)	4

2004 Speedway Grand Prix Final Championship standings (Riding No 12)
Race no.	Grand Prix	Pos.	Pts.	Heats	Draw No
1 /9	(Sweden) Swedish SGP	21st	2	(1,1)	12
2 /9	(Czech Republic) Czech Rep. SGP	23rd	1	(0,0)	20
3 /9	(Europe) European SGP	4th	16	(2,1,2) (2,1,3) +3 +0	21
4 /9	(United Kingdom) British SGP	12th	7	(0) (0,2,0)	4
5 /9	(Denmark) SGP	15th	5	(1,2,2) (0,0)	11
6 /9	(Sweden) Scandinavian SGP	15th	5	(2,2) (0,0)	14
7 /9	(Slovenia) Slovenian SGP	16th	5	(2,2) (0,0)	14
8 /9	(Poland) Polish SGP	11th	7	(1,3,2) (0,3,0)	15
9 /9	(Norway) Norwegian SGP	11th	7	(3,1,2) (1,2,0)	11

2005 Speedway Grand Prix Final Championship standings (Riding No 16)
Race no.	Grand Prix	Pos.	Pts.	Heats	Draw No
8 /9	(Poland) Polish SGP	6th	11	(2,2,2,2,3) +0	7

2006 Speedway Grand Prix Final Championship standings (Riding No 14)
Race no.	Grand Prix	Pos.	Pts.	Heats	Draw No
1 /10	(Slovenia) Slovenian SGP	16th	1	(1,0,0,0,0)	4
2 /10	(Europe) European SGP	15th	3	(0,1,1,1,E)	14
3 /10	(Sweden) Swedish SGP	15th	3	(0,0,0,2,1)	3
4 /10	(United Kingdom) British SGP	16th	3	(2,0,0,1,E)	16
5 /10	(Denmark) SGP	16th	1	(0,1,0,0,0)	7
6 /10	(Italy) Italian SGP	15th	3	(0,2,0,1,0)	15
7 /10	(Sweden) Scandinavian SGP	13th	4	(1,2,0,1,0)	12
8 /10	(Czech Republic) Czech Rep. SGP	12th	5	(1,0,1,3,0)	9
9 /10	(Latvia) Latvian SGP	14th	4	(1,0,1,1,1)	2
10 /10	(Poland) Polish SGP	13th	4	(1,0,2,0,1)	6

permanent speedway rider
wild card, track reserve or qualified reserve
rider not classified (track reserve who did not start)

== Honours ==
=== Speedway Grand Prix ===
- 1996 - 21st place (as wild card)
- 1997 - 13th place
- 1998 - 21st place
- 1999 - 30th place (as wild card)
- 2000 - 30th place (as wild card)
- 2001 - 20th place
- 2002 - 24th place (as wild card)
- 2003 - 11th place
- 2004 - 15th place
- 2005 - 18th place (as wild card)
- 2006 - 16th place
- 2010 - 18th place

=== World Under-21 Championship ===
- 1993 - 5th place
- 1995 - 7th place
- 1996 - World Champion

=== Speedway World Cup ===
- 1996 World Champion
- 2001 - Silver medal
- 2002 - 4th place
- 2003 - 4th place
- 2005 - World Champion
- 2006 - 5th place
- 2009 - World Champion
- 2011 - World Champion
- 2006 - 5th place
- 2014 - Silver medal

=== Individual Speedway Polish Championship ===
- 1995 - 10th in Semi-Final
- 1996 - 13th in Semi-Final
- 1997 - 6th place
- 1998 - 7th place
- 1999 - Polish Champion
- 2000 - 14th place
- 2001 - 13th place
- 2002 - 5th place
- 2003 - 11th place
- 2004 - 10th place
- 2005 - 4th place
- 2006 - 7th place

=== Other events ===
Individual Speedway Junior Polish Championship (U-21)

- 1995 - Silver medal

Polish Pairs Speedway Championship

- 1993 - Silver medal
- 1995 - Silver medal
- 1997 - Polish Champion
- 1998 - Silver medal
- 1999 - Polish Champion
- 2000 - Polish Champion
- 2001 - Silver medal
- 2002 - Polish Champion
- 2003 - Bronze medal
- 2004 - Polish Champion
- 2005 - Silver medal
- 2006 - Silver medal

Polish Pairs Speedway Junior Championship (U-21)

- 1993 - Bronze medal

Team Speedway Polish Championship

- 1995 - Polish Champion
- 1997 - Polish Champion
- 1998 - Polish Champion
- 1999 - 4th place
- 2000 - Polish Champion
- 2001 - Bronze medal
- 2002 - Polish Champion
- 2003 - Silver medal
- 2004 - 4th place
- 2005 - Silver medal
- 2006 - Bronze medal

== See also ==
- Polish national speedway team
- List of Speedway Grand Prix riders
