= Speedway World Cup =

Motorcycle speedway event for national teams

FIM Speedway World Cup
- Current season, competition or edition: 2026 Speedway World Cup
- Formerly: Speedway World Team Cup (1960–2000)
- Sport: Motorcycle speedway
- Founded: 2001
- Director: Phil Morris
- Motto: No brakes, no gears, no fear
- No. of teams: 10 national teams
- Continent: World
- Most recent champion: Australia (2026)
- Most titles: Poland (9 times)
- Broadcaster: Discovery+
- Website: https://www.fimspeedway.com/swc

The Speedway World Cup is a motorcycle speedway event for national teams held in different countries. The first edition of the competition in the current format was held in 2001 and replaced the old World Team Cup which ran from 1960 until 2000. The competition was held annually until 2017 when it was replaced by the Speedway of Nations pairs event. The Speedway World Cup returned in 2023 and will be held every three years.

== Winners ==
Year	Venue	Winners	Runner-up	3rd place
2001	(Poland) Wrocław	Australia (68 pts); Jason Crump; Todd Wiltshire; Craig Boyce; Ryan Sullivan; Leigh Adams	Poland (65 pts); Krzysztof Cegielski; Piotr Protasiewicz; Tomasz Gollob; Sebastian Ułamek; Jacek Krzyżaniak	Sweden (51 pts); Jimmy Nilsen; Mikael Karlsson; Tony Rickardsson; Niklas Klingberg; Andreas Jonsson
2002	(England) Peterborough	Australia (64 pts); Todd Wiltshire; Jason Lyons; Leigh Adams; Jason Crump; Ryan Sullivan	Denmark (58 pts); Nicki Pedersen; Ronni Pedersen; Charlie Gjedde; Hans Andersen; Bjarne Pedersen	Sweden (54 pts); Tony Rickardsson; Niklas Klingberg; Peter Karlsson; Mikael Karlsson; Stefan Andersson
2003	(Denmark) Vojens	Sweden (62 pts); Andreas Jonsson; Mikael Max; Peter Ljung; David Ruud	Australia (57 pts); Jason Crump; Todd Wiltshire; Jason Lyons; Ryan Sullivan; Leigh Adams	Denmark (53 pts); Nicki Pedersen; Hans Andersen; Bjarne Pedersen; Ronni Pedersen; Charlie Gjedde
2004	(England) Poole	Sweden (49 pts); Mikael Max; Tony Rickardsson; Antonio Lindbäck; Andreas Jonsson; Peter Karlsson	Great Britain (48 pts); David Norris; Lee Richardson; Mark Loram; Scott Nicholls; Gary Havelock	Denmark (32 pts); Hans Andersen; Nicki Pedersen; Kenneth Bjerre; Niels Kristian Iversen; Bjarne Pedersen
2005	(Poland) Wrocław	Poland (62 pts); Grzegorz Walasek; Rune Holta; Piotr Protasiewicz; Jarosław Hampel; Tomasz Gollob	Sweden (34 pts); Tony Rickardsson; Peter Karlsson; Andreas Jonsson; Antonio Lindbäck; Fredrik Lindgren	Denmark (31 pts); Hans Andersen; Bjarne Pedersen; Kenneth Bjerre; Nicki Pedersen; Niels Kristian Iversen
2006	(England) Reading	Denmark (45 pts); Niels Kristian Iversen; Nicki Pedersen; Bjarne Pedersen; Hans Andersen; Charlie Gjedde	Sweden (37 pts); Andreas Jonsson; Antonio Lindbäck; Fredrik Lindgren; Mikael Max; Peter Karlsson	Great Britain (36 pts); Lee Richardson; Mark Loram; Scott Nicholls; Chris Louis; Chris Harris
2007	(Poland) Leszno	Poland (55 pts); Krzysztof Kasprzak; Jarosław Hampel; Tomasz Gollob; Rune Holta; Grzegorz Walasek; Damian Baliński	Denmark (52 pts); Hans Andersen; Kenneth Bjerre; Niels Kristian Iversen; Nicki Pedersen; Bjarne Pedersen; Jesper B. Jensen	Australia (29 pts); Ryan Sullivan; Jason Crump; Chris Holder; Leigh Adams; Davey Watt; Rory Schlein
2008	(Denmark) Vojens	Denmark (49 pts); Nicki Pedersen; Bjarne Pedersen; Kenneth Bjerre; Niels Kristian Iversen; Hans Andersen	Poland (46 pts); Rune Holta; Wiesław Jaguś; Tomasz Gollob; Grzegorz Walasek; Jarosław Hampel	Sweden (39 pts); Andreas Jonsson; Daniel Nermark; Peter Ljung; Fredrik Lindgren; Jonas Davidsson
2009	(Poland) Leszno	Poland (44 pts); Krzysztof Kasprzak; Piotr Protasiewicz; Jarosław Hampel; Tomasz Gollob; Adrian Miedziński	Australia (43 pts); Davey Watt; Troy Batchelor; Leigh Adams; Chris Holder; Jason Crump	Sweden (36 pts); Jonas Davidsson; Fredrik Lindgren; Antonio Lindbäck; Andreas Jonsson; David Ruud
2010	(Denmark) Vojens	Poland (44 pts); Rune Holta; Jarosław Hampel; Tomasz Gollob; Adrian Miedziński; Janusz Kołodziej	Denmark (39 pts); Kenneth Bjerre; Nicolai Klindt; Niels Kristian Iversen; Bjarne Pedersen; Hans Andersen	Sweden (35 pts); Fredrik Lindgren; Jonas Davidsson; Antonio Lindbäck; Magnus Zetterström; Andreas Jonsson
2011	(Poland) Gorzów Wielkopolski	Poland (51 pts); Tomasz Gollob; Jaroslaw Hampel; Krzysztof Kasprzak; Piotr Protasiewicz; Janusz Kołodziej	Australia (45 pts); Chris Holder; Jason Crump; Troy Batchelor; Darcy Ward; Davey Watt	Sweden (30 pts); Fredrik Lindgren; Antonio Lindbäck; Thomas H. Jonasson; Jonas Davidsson; Andreas Jonsson
2012	(Sweden) Målilla	Denmark (39 pts); Niels K Iversen; Michael Jepsen Jensen; Nicki Pedersen; Mikkel B Jensen	Australia (36 pts); Jason Crump; Darcy Ward; Davey Watt; Chris Holder	Russia (30 pts); Emil Sayfutdinov; Grigory Laguta; Artem Laguta; Roman Povazhny
2013	(Czech Republic) Prague	Poland (41 pts); Jarosław Hampel; Maciej Janowski; Krzysztof Kasprzak; Patryk Dudek	Denmark (40 pts); Niels Kristian Iversen; Kenneth Bjerre; Nicki Pedersen; Michael Jepsen Jensen	Australia (34 pts); Darcy Ward; Troy Batchelor; Cameron Woodward; Jason Doyle
2014	(Poland) Bydgoszcz	Denmark (38 pts); Nicki Pedersen; Peter Kildemand; Mads Korneliussen; Niels Kristian Iversen	Poland (37 pts); Piotr Protasiewicz; Krzysztof Kasprzak; Janusz Kołodziej; Jarosław Hampel	Australia (36 pts); Chris Holder; Darcy Ward; Troy Batchelor; Jason Doyle
2015	(Denmark) Vojens	Sweden (34 pts); Antonio Lindbäck; Andreas Jonsson; Linus Sundström; Fredrik Lindgren	Denmark (32 pts); Peter Kildemand; Niels Kristian Iversen; Nicki Pedersen; Kenneth Bjerre	Poland (27 pts); Bartosz Zmarzlik; Krzysztof Buczkowski; Maciej Janowski; Przemysław Pawlicki
2016	(England) Manchester	Poland (39 pts); Piotr Pawlicki Jr. Bartosz Zmarzlik; Patryk Dudek; Krzysztof Kasprzak; Krystian Pieszczek	Great Britain (32 pts); Craig Cook; Tai Woffinden; Danny King; Robert Lambert; Adam Ellis	Sweden (30 pts); Andreas Jonsson; Antonio Lindbäck; Peter Ljung; Fredrik Lindgren; Joel Andersson
2017	(Poland) Leszno	Poland (50 pts); Patryk Dudek; Maciej Janowski; Piotr Pawlicki Jr. Bartosz Zmarzlik; Bartosz Smektała	Sweden (42 pts); Antonio Lindbäck; Fredrik Lindgren; Linus Sundström; Andreas Jonsson; Joel Kling	Russia (18 pts); Emil Sayfutdinov; Vadim Tarasenko; Andrey Kudriashov; Gleb Chugunov; Grigory Laguta
2023	(Poland) Wrocław	Poland (33 pts); Bartosz Zmarzlik; Maciej Janowski; Patryk Dudek; Janusz Kołodziej; Dominik Kubera	Great Britain (31 pts); Dan Bewley; Robert Lambert; Tai Woffinden; Adam Ellis; Tom Brennan	Denmark (29 pts); Leon Madsen; Anders Thomsen; Mikkel Michelsen; Nicki Pedersen; Rasmus Jensen
2026	(Poland) Warsaw	Australia (38 pts); Ryan Douglas; Brady Kurtz (C); Jason Doyle; Max Fricke; Rohan Tungate	Denmark (30 pts); Mikkel Michelsen; Leon Madsen; Michael Jepsen Jensen (C); Anders Thomsen; Frederik Jakobsen	Poland (29 pts); Bartosz Zmarzlik (C); Maciej Janowski; Dominik Kubera; Patryk Dudek; Kacper Woryna

=== Medal classification ===
Pos	National Team	Gold	Silver	Bronze	Total
1.	Poland	9	3	2	14
2.	Denmark	4	6	4	14
3.	Australia	3	4	3	10
4.	Sweden	3	3	7	13
5.	Great Britain	-	3	1	4
6.	Russia	-	-	2	2

Further information: Speedway World Cup Classification

Pos	Rider	Team	Gold	Silver	Bronze	Total
1.	Jarosław Hampel	Poland	6	2	-	8
2.	Tomasz Gollob	Poland	5	2	-	7
3.	Krzysztof Kasprzak	Poland	5	1	-	6
4.	Nicki Pedersen	Denmark	4	4	4	12
5.	Niels Kristian Iversen	Denmark	4	4	2	10
6.	Patryk Dudek	Poland	4	-	1	5
7.	Andreas Jonsson	Sweden	3	2	6	11
8.	Piotr Protasiewicz	Poland	3	2	-	5
9.	Rune Holta	Poland	3	1	-	4
9.	Janusz Kołodziej	Poland	3	1	-	4

== Participating nations ==
Team	2001 (Poland) (12)	2002 (United Kingdom) (12)	2003 (Denmark) (12)	2004 (United Kingdom) (8)	2005 (Poland) (8)	2006 (United Kingdom) (8)	2007 (Poland) (8)	2008 (Denmark) (8)	2009 (Poland) (8)	2010 (Denmark) (8)	2011 (Poland) (8)	2012 (Sweden) (9)	2013 (Czech Republic) (9)	2014 (Poland) (9)	2015 (Denmark) (9)	2016 (United Kingdom) (9)	2017 (Poland) (9)	2023 (Poland) (9)	2026 (Poland) (10)
Poland	Silver	4	4	4	Gold	5	Gold	Silver	Gold	Gold	Gold	5	Gold	Silver	Bronze	Gold	Gold	Gold	Bronze
Denmark	4	Silver	Bronze	Bronze	Bronze	Gold	Silver	Gold	6	Silver	4	Gold	Silver	Gold	Silver	5	8	Bronze	Silver
Australia	Gold	Gold	Silver	5	5	4	Bronze	4	Silver	5	Silver	Silver	Bronze	Bronze	4	4	5	4	Gold
Sweden	Bronze	Bronze	Gold	Gold	Silver	Silver	5	Bronze	Bronze	Bronze	Bronze	4	8	5	Gold	Bronze	Silver	5	7
Great Britain	6	7	5	Silver	4	Bronze	4	5	5	4	6	6	7	4	5	Silver	4	Silver	4
Russia	8	9	8	•	7	•	6	6	4	6	5	Bronze	9	•	7	6	Bronze		
Czech Republic	7	5	6	6	6	8	•	7	8	8	7	7	4	7	8	8	9	7	6
United States	5	6			•	6	7	•	•	•	•	8	5	6	6	7	7	•	
Latvia	•	•	••	•	•	•	•	•	•	•	•	•	6	8	9	•	6	•	5
France					•							•	•				•	6	
Finland	9	8	7	•		7	8	•	•	7	•	•						9	
Slovenia	12	11	9	•	•	•	•	•	7	•	•	•	•	•	•	•		•	
Italy	•		12	7	•	•	•	•	•	•	•	•	•	9	•	•	•	•	
Germany	11	12	10	•	8	•	•	•	•	•	8	9	•	•	•	9	•	8	8
Hungary	10	10	11	8	•	•	•	8	•				•					•	
Ukraine	•										•	•	•					•	9
Norway	•									•								•	10
Austria		•	•	•														•	

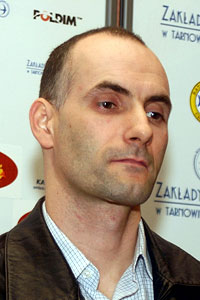
Tomasz Gollob won the title five times as part of the Polish team.

Legend

- (gold) – Champions.
- (silver) – Runners-up.
- (bronze) – Third place.
- •• – Qualified, but withdrew.
- • – Did not qualify.
- – Did not enter or withdrew.
- – Race-off and final hosts.

== Format ==
The current tournament format consists of two semi finals with the winner qualifying for the grand final and the second and third place teams entering a race off. In the four team race off only the winner will join the two semi final winners and the hosts in the grand final.

== See also ==
- Speedway World Team Cup
- Speedway of Nations
