= Poland national speedway team =

Polish international motorcycle speedway team

Poland
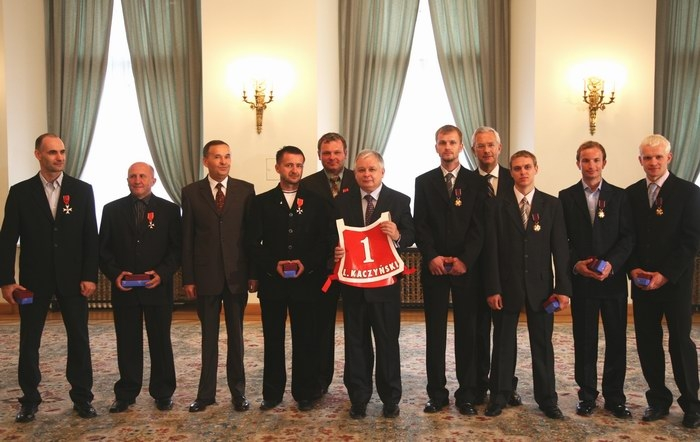
- National speedway team with the President of Poland, Lech Kaczyński
- Nickname(s): Biało-czerwoni ("The white and reds"); Białe Orły ("The White Eagles")
- Association: Polish Motor Union; Polski Związek Motorowy
- FIM code: PZM
- Team manager: Rafał Dobrucki
- Team captain: Bartosz Zmarzlik
- Nation colour: White and Red
- SWC wins: 14 (1961, 1965, 1966, 1969, 1996, 2005, 2007, 2009, 2010, 2011, 2013, 2016, 2017, 2023)

The Poland national speedway team is the national motorcycle speedway team of Poland and is controlled by the Polish Motor Union (PZM). They are one of the most successful speedway nations of all time.

== History ==
The Polish speedway team participated in the inaugural Speedway World Team Cup, being seeded through to the final of the 1960 Speedway World Team Cup. The team were a major force in the opening decade of the tournament, winning the World Team Cup in 1961, 1965, 1966 and 1969, with only the Swedish team winning more World Cups.

In the 1970s, the team continued to be one of the major forces in Eastern Europe and qualified for the World Team Cup final every year from 1970 to 1979. Andrzej Wyglenda and Jerzy Szczakiel also won the 1971 Speedway World Pairs Championship. However, during the 1980s the team began to struggle against the best nations and only managed two finals in 1980 and 1984.

It was not until the mid-1990s and the arrival of Tomasz Gollob that Poland began to challenge the best nations. The team won the silver medal at the 1994 Speedway World Team Cup (their first final for 10 years). They then won the World Team Cup for the sixth time in 1996 (27 years after their last win).

In 2001, the Speedway World Team Cup was rebranded the Speedway World Cup and Poland began to experience a boom in terms of spectator numbers, which led to an influx of new riders. The team reached the World Cup final every year from 2001 to 2017 (except for 2006 and 2012) and dominated world speedway by winning the title eight times, in 2005, 2007, 2009, 2010, 2011, 2013, 2016 and 2017.

Poland's speedway team was awarded the Team of the Year in Poland by Przegląd Sportowy in 2009 and 2010.

Although the team failed to win the Speedway of Nations from 2018 to 2022, they did win the World Cup when it returned in 2023. The World Cup win was their 14th World Team Championship (one behind Denmark in the all time standings).

== Major world titles ==
=== World Team Cup ===
Year	Venue	Standings (Pts)	Riders	Pts
1961	(Poland); Wrocław; Stadion Olimpijski	1. Poland (32); 2. Sweden (31); 3. England (21); 4. Czechoslovakia (12)	Marian Kaiser	10
1961	(Poland); Wrocław; Stadion Olimpijski	1. Poland (32); 2. Sweden (31); 3. England (21); 4. Czechoslovakia (12)	Henryk Żyto	7
1961	(Poland); Wrocław; Stadion Olimpijski	1. Poland (32); 2. Sweden (31); 3. England (21); 4. Czechoslovakia (12)	Florian Kapała	6
1961	(Poland); Wrocław; Stadion Olimpijski	1. Poland (32); 2. Sweden (31); 3. England (21); 4. Czechoslovakia (12)	Mieczysław Połukard	5
1961	(Poland); Wrocław; Stadion Olimpijski	1. Poland (32); 2. Sweden (31); 3. England (21); 4. Czechoslovakia (12)	Stanisław Tkocz	4
1965	(West Germany); Kempten; Kempten Speedway	1. Poland (38); 2. Sweden (34); 3. (United Kingdom) Great Britain (18); 4. Soviet Union (7)	Andrzej Pogorzelski	11
1965	(West Germany); Kempten; Kempten Speedway	1. Poland (38); 2. Sweden (34); 3. (United Kingdom) Great Britain (18); 4. Soviet Union (7)	Andrzej Wyglenda	11
1965	(West Germany); Kempten; Kempten Speedway	1. Poland (38); 2. Sweden (34); 3. (United Kingdom) Great Britain (18); 4. Soviet Union (7)	Antoni Woryna	9
1965	(West Germany); Kempten; Kempten Speedway	1. Poland (38); 2. Sweden (34); 3. (United Kingdom) Great Britain (18); 4. Soviet Union (7)	Zbigniew Podlecki	7
1966	(Poland); Wrocław; Stadion Olimpijski	1. Poland (40); 2. Soviet Union (26); 3. Sweden (22); 4. (United Kingdom) Great Britain (8)	Andrzej Wyglenda	11
1966	(Poland); Wrocław; Stadion Olimpijski	1. Poland (40); 2. Soviet Union (26); 3. Sweden (22); 4. (United Kingdom) Great Britain (8)	Antoni Woryna	10
1966	(Poland); Wrocław; Stadion Olimpijski	1. Poland (40); 2. Soviet Union (26); 3. Sweden (22); 4. (United Kingdom) Great Britain (8)	Marian Rose	10
1966	(Poland); Wrocław; Stadion Olimpijski	1. Poland (40); 2. Soviet Union (26); 3. Sweden (22); 4. (United Kingdom) Great Britain (8)	Andrzej Pogorzelski	8
1969	(Poland); Rybnik; Rybnik Municipal Stadium	1. Poland (31); 2. (United Kingdom) Great Britain (23); 3. Soviet Union (23); 4. Sweden (12)	Andrzej Wyglenda	11
1969	(Poland); Rybnik; Rybnik Municipal Stadium	1. Poland (31); 2. (United Kingdom) Great Britain (23); 3. Soviet Union (23); 4. Sweden (12)	Edward Jancarz	11
1969	(Poland); Rybnik; Rybnik Municipal Stadium	1. Poland (31); 2. (United Kingdom) Great Britain (23); 3. Soviet Union (23); 4. Sweden (12)	Stanisław Tkoc	4
1969	(Poland); Rybnik; Rybnik Municipal Stadium	1. Poland (31); 2. (United Kingdom) Great Britain (23); 3. Soviet Union (23); 4. Sweden (12)	Henryk Glücklich	3
1969	(Poland); Rybnik; Rybnik Municipal Stadium	1. Poland (31); 2. (United Kingdom) Great Britain (23); 3. Soviet Union (23); 4. Sweden (12)	Andrzej Pogorzelski	2
1996	(Germany); Diedenbergen; Rhein-Main Arena	1. Poland (27); 2. Russia (22); 3. Denmark (21); 4. Germany (20); 5. Sweden (14); 6. (United Kingdom) Great Britain (12); 7. Hungary (9)	Tomasz Gollob	15
1996	(Germany); Diedenbergen; Rhein-Main Arena	1. Poland (27); 2. Russia (22); 3. Denmark (21); 4. Germany (20); 5. Sweden (14); 6. (United Kingdom) Great Britain (12); 7. Hungary (9)	Sławomir Drabik	12
1996	(Germany); Diedenbergen; Rhein-Main Arena	1. Poland (27); 2. Russia (22); 3. Denmark (21); 4. Germany (20); 5. Sweden (14); 6. (United Kingdom) Great Britain (12); 7. Hungary (9)	Piotr Protasiewicz	0
2005	(Poland); Wrocław; Stadion Olimpijski	1. Poland (62); 2. Sweden (34); 3. Denmark (31); 4. (United Kingdom) Great Britain (27)	Tomasz Gollob	14
2005	(Poland); Wrocław; Stadion Olimpijski	1. Poland (62); 2. Sweden (34); 3. Denmark (31); 4. (United Kingdom) Great Britain (27)	Jarosław Hampel	13
2005	(Poland); Wrocław; Stadion Olimpijski	1. Poland (62); 2. Sweden (34); 3. Denmark (31); 4. (United Kingdom) Great Britain (27)	Piotr Protasiewicz	13
2005	(Poland); Wrocław; Stadion Olimpijski	1. Poland (62); 2. Sweden (34); 3. Denmark (31); 4. (United Kingdom) Great Britain (27)	Rune Holta	12
2005	(Poland); Wrocław; Stadion Olimpijski	1. Poland (62); 2. Sweden (34); 3. Denmark (31); 4. (United Kingdom) Great Britain (27)	Grzegorz Walasek	10
2007	(Poland); Leszno; Alfred Smoczyk Stadium	1. Poland (55); 2. Denmark (52); 3. Australia (29); 4. (United Kingdom) Great Britain (15)	Krzysztof Kasprzak	14
2007	(Poland); Leszno; Alfred Smoczyk Stadium	1. Poland (55); 2. Denmark (52); 3. Australia (29); 4. (United Kingdom) Great Britain (15)	Jarosław Hampel	13
2007	(Poland); Leszno; Alfred Smoczyk Stadium	1. Poland (55); 2. Denmark (52); 3. Australia (29); 4. (United Kingdom) Great Britain (15)	Tomasz Gollob	12
2007	(Poland); Leszno; Alfred Smoczyk Stadium	1. Poland (55); 2. Denmark (52); 3. Australia (29); 4. (United Kingdom) Great Britain (15)	Rune Holta	12
2007	(Poland); Leszno; Alfred Smoczyk Stadium	1. Poland (55); 2. Denmark (52); 3. Australia (29); 4. (United Kingdom) Great Britain (15)	Damian Baliński	4
2009	(Poland); Leszno; Alfred Smoczyk Stadium	1. Poland (44); 2. Australia (43); 3. Sweden (36); 4. Russia (35)	Jarosław Hampel	18
2009	(Poland); Leszno; Alfred Smoczyk Stadium	1. Poland (44); 2. Australia (43); 3. Sweden (36); 4. Russia (35)	Krzysztof Kasprzak	10
2009	(Poland); Leszno; Alfred Smoczyk Stadium	1. Poland (44); 2. Australia (43); 3. Sweden (36); 4. Russia (35)	Adrian Miedziński	7
2009	(Poland); Leszno; Alfred Smoczyk Stadium	1. Poland (44); 2. Australia (43); 3. Sweden (36); 4. Russia (35)	Tomasz Gollob	6
2009	(Poland); Leszno; Alfred Smoczyk Stadium	1. Poland (44); 2. Australia (43); 3. Sweden (36); 4. Russia (35)	Piotr Protasiewicz	3
2010	(Denmark); Vojens; Vojens Speedway Center	1. Poland (44); 2. Denmark (39); 3. Sweden (35); 4. (United Kingdom) Great Britain (33)	Tomasz Gollob	12
2010	(Denmark); Vojens; Vojens Speedway Center	1. Poland (44); 2. Denmark (39); 3. Sweden (35); 4. (United Kingdom) Great Britain (33)	Jarosław Hampel	11
2010	(Denmark); Vojens; Vojens Speedway Center	1. Poland (44); 2. Denmark (39); 3. Sweden (35); 4. (United Kingdom) Great Britain (33)	Rune Holta	10
2010	(Denmark); Vojens; Vojens Speedway Center	1. Poland (44); 2. Denmark (39); 3. Sweden (35); 4. (United Kingdom) Great Britain (33)	Janusz Kołodziej	6
2010	(Denmark); Vojens; Vojens Speedway Center	1. Poland (44); 2. Denmark (39); 3. Sweden (35); 4. (United Kingdom) Great Britain (33)	Adrian Miedziński	5
2011	(Poland); Gorzów Wielkopolski; Edward Jancarz Stadium	1. Poland (51); 2. Australia (45); 3. Sweden (30); 4. Denmark (29)	Tomasz Gollob	17
2011	(Poland); Gorzów Wielkopolski; Edward Jancarz Stadium	1. Poland (51); 2. Australia (45); 3. Sweden (30); 4. Denmark (29)	Jarosław Hampel	11
2011	(Poland); Gorzów Wielkopolski; Edward Jancarz Stadium	1. Poland (51); 2. Australia (45); 3. Sweden (30); 4. Denmark (29)	Krzysztof Kasprzak	8
2011	(Poland); Gorzów Wielkopolski; Edward Jancarz Stadium	1. Poland (51); 2. Australia (45); 3. Sweden (30); 4. Denmark (29)	Piotr Protasiewicz	8
2011	(Poland); Gorzów Wielkopolski; Edward Jancarz Stadium	1. Poland (51); 2. Australia (45); 3. Sweden (30); 4. Denmark (29)	Janusz Kołodziej	7
2013	(Czech Republic); Prague; Markéta Stadium	1. Poland (31); 2. Denmark (40); 3. Australia (33); 4. Czech Republic (12)	Jarosław Hampel	15
2013	(Czech Republic); Prague; Markéta Stadium	1. Poland (31); 2. Denmark (40); 3. Australia (33); 4. Czech Republic (12)	Maciej Janowski	12
2013	(Czech Republic); Prague; Markéta Stadium	1. Poland (31); 2. Denmark (40); 3. Australia (33); 4. Czech Republic (12)	Krzysztof Kasprzak	7
2013	(Czech Republic); Prague; Markéta Stadium	1. Poland (31); 2. Denmark (40); 3. Australia (33); 4. Czech Republic (12)	Patryk Dudek	7
2016	(England); Manchester; National Speedway Stadium	1. Poland (39); 2. (United Kingdom) Great Britain (32); 3. Sweden (27); 4. Australia (22)	Bartosz Zmarzlik	11
2016	(England); Manchester; National Speedway Stadium	1. Poland (39); 2. (United Kingdom) Great Britain (32); 3. Sweden (27); 4. Australia (22)	Patryk Dudek	10
2016	(England); Manchester; National Speedway Stadium	1. Poland (39); 2. (United Kingdom) Great Britain (32); 3. Sweden (27); 4. Australia (22)	Piotr Pawlicki Jr.	10
2016	(England); Manchester; National Speedway Stadium	1. Poland (39); 2. (United Kingdom) Great Britain (32); 3. Sweden (27); 4. Australia (22)	Krzysztof Kasprzak	8
2017	(Poland); Leszno; Alfred Smoczyk Stadium	1. Poland (50); 2. Sweden (27); 3. Russia (18); 4. (United Kingdom) Great Britain (15)	Maciej Janowski	14
2017	(Poland); Leszno; Alfred Smoczyk Stadium	1. Poland (50); 2. Sweden (27); 3. Russia (18); 4. (United Kingdom) Great Britain (15)	Bartosz Zmarzlik	13
2017	(Poland); Leszno; Alfred Smoczyk Stadium	1. Poland (50); 2. Sweden (27); 3. Russia (18); 4. (United Kingdom) Great Britain (15)	Piotr Pawlicki Jr.	13
2017	(Poland); Leszno; Alfred Smoczyk Stadium	1. Poland (50); 2. Sweden (27); 3. Russia (18); 4. (United Kingdom) Great Britain (15)	Patryk Dudek	10
2023	(Poland); Wrocław; Stadion Olimpijski	1. Poland (33); 2. (United Kingdom) Great Britain (31); 3. Denmark (29); 4. Australia (27)	Bartosz Zmarzlik	11
2023	(Poland); Wrocław; Stadion Olimpijski	1. Poland (33); 2. (United Kingdom) Great Britain (31); 3. Denmark (29); 4. Australia (27)	Dominik Kubera	9
2023	(Poland); Wrocław; Stadion Olimpijski	1. Poland (33); 2. (United Kingdom) Great Britain (31); 3. Denmark (29); 4. Australia (27)	Maciej Janowski	7
2023	(Poland); Wrocław; Stadion Olimpijski	1. Poland (33); 2. (United Kingdom) Great Britain (31); 3. Denmark (29); 4. Australia (27)	Patryk Dudek	6
2023	(Poland); Wrocław; Stadion Olimpijski	1. Poland (33); 2. (United Kingdom) Great Britain (31); 3. Denmark (29); 4. Australia (27)	Janusz Kołodziej	0

=== World Pairs Championship ===
Year	Venue	Standings (Pts)	Riders	Pts
1971	(Poland); Rybnik; Rybnik Municipal Stadium	1. Poland (30); 2. New Zealand (25); 3. Sweden (22); 4. Czechoslovakia (17); 5. Scotland (16); 6. (Socialist Federal Republic of Yugoslavia) Yugoslavia (10); 7. Austria (6)	Andrzej Wyglenda	15
1971	(Poland); Rybnik; Rybnik Municipal Stadium	1. Poland (30); 2. New Zealand (25); 3. Sweden (22); 4. Czechoslovakia (17); 5. Scotland (16); 6. (Socialist Federal Republic of Yugoslavia) Yugoslavia (10); 7. Austria (6)	Jerzy Szczakiel	15

== International caps (as of 2022) ==
Since the advent of the Speedway Grand Prix era, international caps earned by riders is largely restricted to international competitions, whereas previously test matches between two teams were a regular occurrence. This means that the number of caps earned by a rider has decreased in the modern era.

Rider	Caps
Bajerski, Tomasz	3
Baliński, Damian	2
Baron, Piotr	
Bentke, Kazimierz	3
Blaszak, Eugeniusz	5
Buczkowski, Krzysztof	1
Cegielski, Krzysztof	5
Cieślak, Marek	29
Dados, Robert	
Dobrucki, Rafał	4
Dobrucki, Zdzisław	
Dołomisiewicz, Ryszard	
Drabik, Sławomir	13
Dudek, Patryk	
Dzikowski, Grzegorz	
Fabiszewski, Ryszard	
Fajfer, Tomasz	
Fleigert, Dariusz	1
Franczyszyn, Ryszard	
Friedek, Zygfryd	
Glücklich, Henryk	41
Gollob, Jacek	
Gollob, Tomasz	52
Gomólski, Jacek	
Hampel, Jarosław	24
Holta, Rune	
Huszcza, Andrzej	45
Jaguś, Wiesław	
Jancarz, Edward	76
Jankowski, Roman	47
Janowski, Maciej	
Jaworek, Maciej	
Jurczyński, Andrzej	24
Kaiser, Marian	31
Kapała, Florian	
Kasprzak, Krzysztof	13
Kasprzak, Zenon	
Kepa, Marek	7
Kołodziej, Janusz	8
Kowalik, Mirosław	8
Kubera, Dominik	
Krzyżaniak, Jacek	
Krzystyniak, Jan	
Kurmanski, Rafal	1
Kowczala, Stefan	3
Labedzki, Adam	3
Malinowski, Jan	
Miedziński, Adrian	4
Migoś, Edmund	
Mroz, Marek	1
Mucha, Jan	
Nowak, Bogusław	
Okupski, Krzysztof	
Olkiewicz, Adam	1
Olszak, Henryk	
Olszewski, Jarosław	
Patynek, Wieslaw	1
Pawlicki Jr., Piotr	
Pawlicki, Przemysław	
Pieszczek, Krystian	
Plech, Zenon	76
Pociejkewicz, Konstanty	
Podlecki, Zbigniew	
Pogorzelski, Andrzej	
Połukard, Mieczysław	
Proch, Bolesław	15
Protasiewicz, Piotr	24
Pyszny, Piotr	20
Raba, Leonard	10
Rembas, Jerzy	40
Rempała, Jacek	8
Rempała, Marcin	1
Rogal, Bronislaw	
Rose, Marian	
Skupien, Eugeniusz	
Słaboń, Robert	11
Śledź, Dariusz	7
Smektała, Bartosz	
Stachyra, Janusz	
Świst, Piotr	18
Szczakiel, Jerzy	
Tkocz, Andrzej	18
Tkocz, Stanisław	
Teodorowicz, Tadeusz	5
Trzeszkowski, Jerzy	24
Ułamek, Sebastian	9
Walasek, Grzegorz	15
Waloszek, Paweł	74
Woryna, Antoni	47
Wyglenda, Andrzej	
Żabiałowicz, Wojciech	
Zabik, Jan	8
Zmarzlik, Bartosz	
Żyto, Henryk	32

== See also ==
- Speedway in Poland
