= Ronni Pedersen =

Danish speedway rider

- Born: 6 October 1974 (age 52); Middelfart, Denmark
- Nationality: Danish

Career history

Denmark
- 2000–2005: Slangerup

Great Britain
- 1993–1995, 1997–1998: Peterborough Panthers
- 2001–2002: King's Lynn Stars

Sweden
- 1996, 2003: Vargarna
- 1999–2000: Piraterna
- 2001–2002: Lejonen

Poland
- 1999: Leszno
- 2001–2002: Rawicz
- 2003: Grudziądz

Individual honours
- 1992: Danish U21 champion

Ronni Pedersen (born 6 October 1974) is a Danish former motorcycle speedway rider. He earned 6 caps for the Denmark national speedway team.

== Career ==
After winning the 1992 Danish Under 21 Individual Speedway Championship, Pedersen was signed by Peterborough Panthers to ride late in the 1993 British League Division Two season. The following season, he rose to third in the Peterborough averages and in his debut season in the top tier of British speedway (the 1995 Premier League speedway season) he averaged 6.53.

Pedersen missed the 1996 British season after breaking his leg while playing football. On his return to Britain he only rode a handful of matches over the following two seasons.

Pedersen joined King's Lynn Stars in 2001 and rode in two Danish finals in 2002 and 2003. His final team in Britain was in 2004 when he rode for Arena Essex Hammers.

== Family ==
His brother Nicki Pedersen is a three-time Individual Speedway World Champion, while his son Bastian Pedersen is also a speedway rider.

== Results ==
=== World Championships ===
- Individual World Championship and Speedway Grand Prix
  - 1994 - track reserve in Danish Final
  - 2005 - 33rd place (3 pts in one event)
  - 2006 - 23rd place (23 pts in six event)
- Team World Championship (Speedway World Team Cup and Speedway World Cup)
  - 2002 - (England) Peterborough - Runner-up (7 pts)
  - 2003 - (Denmark) Vojens - 3rd place (4 pts)
- Individual U-21 World Championship
  - 1994 - (Norway) Elgane - 6th place (10 pts)
  - 1995 - (Finland) Tampere - 8th place (7 pts)

=== European Championships ===
- Individual European Championship
  - 2002 - (Poland) Rybnik - 7th place (9 pts)

== See also ==
- List of Speedway Grand Prix riders
