= Tomasz Bajerski =

Polish speedway rider

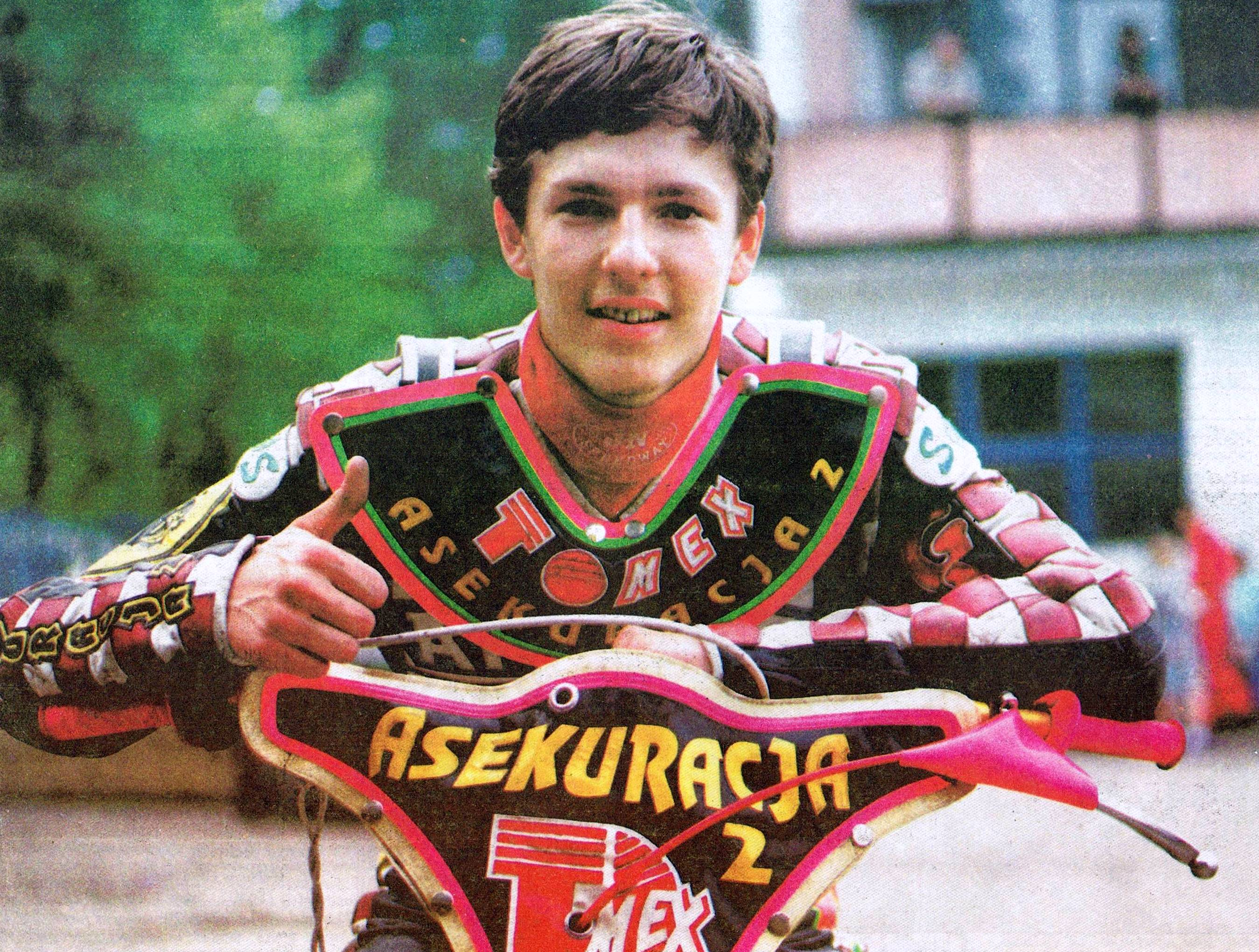
- Born: 9 September 1975 (age 51); Toruń, Poland
- Nationality: Polish

Career history

Poland
- 1992-1996, 2001-2004: Toruń
- 1997-2000: Gorzów
- 2005: Gdańsk
- 2006: Grudziądz
- 2007: Daugavpils
- 2008: Miskolc
- 2009: Krosno
- 2010: Piła

Great Britain
- 2001: King's Lynn Stars
- 2005: Oxford Cheetahs
- 2006: Peterborough Panthers

Denmark
- 2000, 2007: Holstebro
- 2001, 2003: Brovst

Sweden
- 2000: Västervik
- 2002-2003: Piraterna

Individual honours
- 1993, 1996: U-21 Polish Champion

Team honours
- 2000: Team Polish Champion
- 2003: Allsvenskan Champion

Tomasz Bajerski (born 9 September 1975 in Toruń, Poland) is a former motorcycle speedway rider from Poland. He earned three international caps for the Poland national speedway team.

== Career ==
Bajerski rode in the 2003 Speedway Grand Prix. He was won Team Polish Champion title in 2001 and Individual U-21 Polish Champion titles in 1993 and 1996.

In the British leagues, Exeter Falcons wanted to sign Bajerski in 1995 before he actually rode for King's Lynn Stars, Oxford Cheetahs and Peterborough Panthers in the British speedway leagues.

== Speedway Grand Prix results ==
Year	Position	Points	Best Finish	Notes
2003	15th	51	6th place in Speedway Grand Prix of Slovenia	

== Results ==
=== World Championships ===
- Individual World Championship (Speedway Grand Prix)
  - 2003 - 15th place (51 points)
- Individual U-21 World Championship
  - 1992 - (Germany) Pfaffenhofen - 11th place (6 points)
  - 1993 - (Czech Republic) Pardubice - 7th place (8 points)
  - 1994 - (Norway) Elgane - 5th place (11 points)
- Team World Championship (Speedway World Cup)
  - 2003 - (Denmark) Vojens - 4th place (6 points)

=== European Championships ===
- European Club Champions' Cup
  - 2002 - (Czech Republic) Pardubice - Bronze medal (7 points)

=== Polish competitions ===
- Individual U-21 Polish Championship
  - 1993 - (Poland) Toruń - Polish Champion
  - 1996 - (Poland) Rzeszów - Polish Champion
- Team Polish Championship
  - 1992 - Bronze medal
  - 1993 - Bronze medal
  - 1994 - Bronze medal
  - 1995 - Runner-up
  - 1996 - Runner-up
  - 2000 - Bronze medal
  - 2001 - Polish Champion
  - 2003 - Runner-up
- Golden Helmet
  - 1995 - (Poland) Wrocław - Bronze medal
  - 1997 - (Poland) Wrocław - Runner-up
- Silver Helmet U-21
  - 1992 - (Poland) Grudziądz - Runner-up
- Bronze Helmet U-19
  - 1993 - (Poland) Tarnów - Runner-up

== See also ==
- Poland national speedway team
- List of Speedway Grand Prix riders
