= Tomasz Gollob =

Polish speedway rider

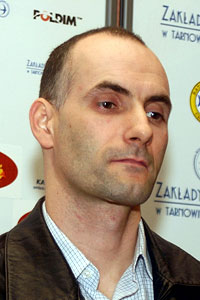
- Born: 11 April 1971 (age 55); Bydgoszcz, Poland
- Nationality: Polish
- Website: www.gollobracing.com

Career history

Poland
- 1988, 1990–2003: Polonia Bydgoszcz
- 1989: Wybrzeże Gdańsk
- 2004–2007: Unia Tarnów
- 2008–2012: Stal Gorzów
- 2013–2014: KS Toruń
- 2015–2016: GKM Grudziądz

Great Britain
- 1998–2000: Ipswich Witches

Sweden
- 1997: Valsarna
- 2001–2010: Västervik
- 2011–2012: Hammarby

Denmark
- 2009: Esbjerg

Speedway Grand Prix statistics
- Starts: 163
- Podiums: 53 (22-10-21)
- Finalist: 66 times
- Winner: 22 times

Individual honours
- 2010: World Champion
- 2005-2012: Speedway Grand Prix winner (22 times)
- 1992, 1993, 1994, 1995 2001, 2002, 2006, 2009: Polish Champion
- 1990, 1991, 1992: Polish Under 21 Champion
- 1996: Continental Champion
- 1994, 1995, 1997, 2000 2002: Polish Golden Helmet Winner
- 1990, 2002: Polish Silver Helmet Winner
- 1995: Jack Young Memorial Cup winner

Team honours
- 1996: World Team Cup Winner
- 2005, 2007, 2009, 2010: World Cup Winner
- 2001: European Cup Champions' Winner
- 1992, 1997, 1998, 2000 2002, 2004, 2005: Polish Team Champion
- 1990, 1991, 1993, 1994 1995, 1996, 1997, 1999 2000, 2002: Polish Pairs Champion
- 1998: Elite League Champion
- 1998: Elite League KO Cup Winner
- 1998: Craven Shield Winner
- 2005, 2006: Swedish Elitserien Champion

Tomasz Robert Gollob (Polish pronunciation: [ˈtɔmaʐ ˈɡɔlːɔp]; born 11 April 1971 in Bydgoszcz, Poland) is a former Polish motorcycle speedway rider and 2010 World Champion. He appeared in every Speedway Grand Prix series between its inaugural season in 1995 and 2013. He earned 52 caps for the Poland national speedway team.

== Career summary ==
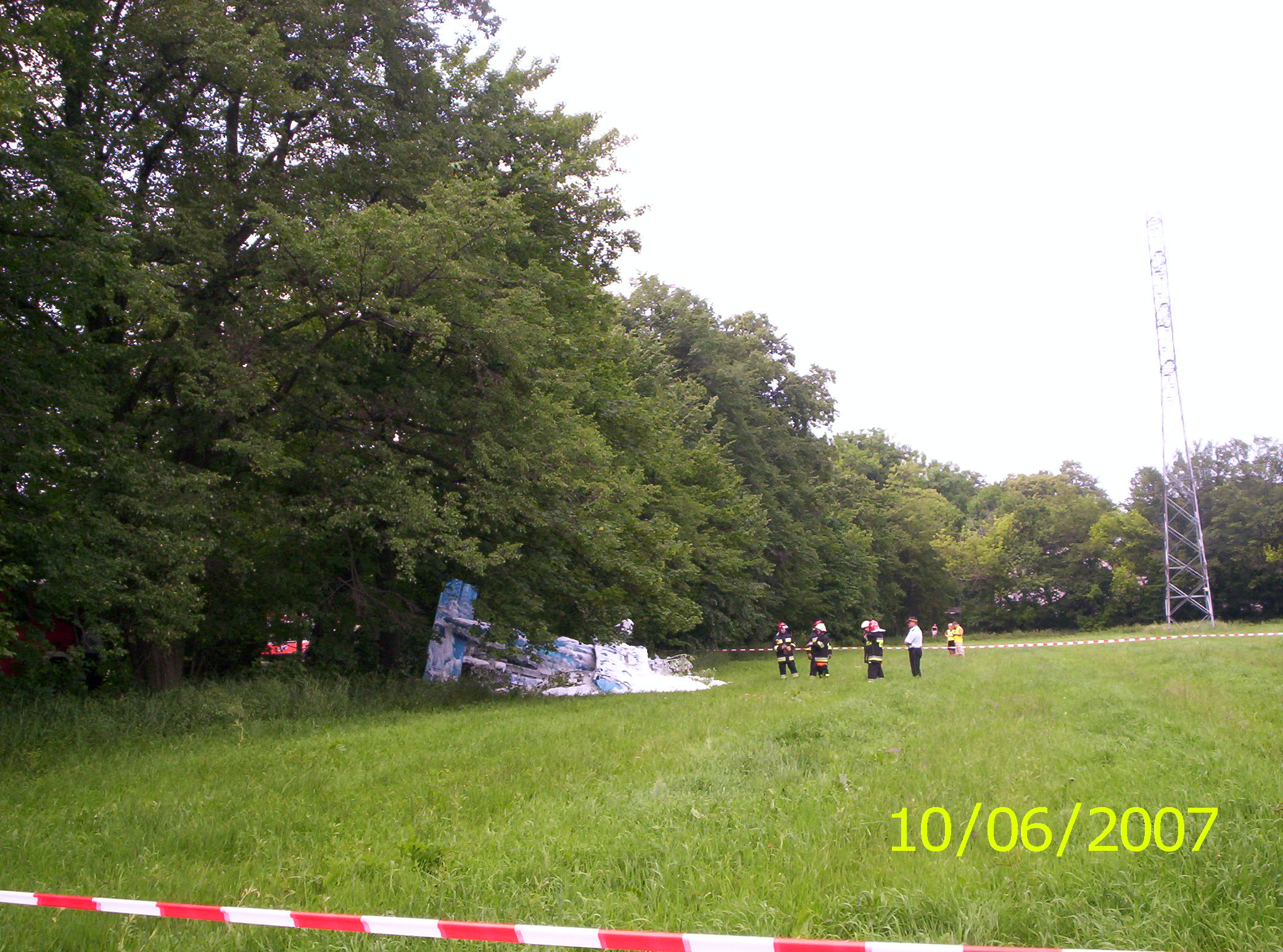
Site of 2007 plane crash.

Gollob spent almost all of his career with hometown club Bydgoszcz until he moved to Unia Tarnów in 2004. He has won the Polish Individual Championship eight times (between 1992 and 2009) and the Polish Pairs Championship ten times. He has also won the Polish Grand Prix eight times in thirteen years. He clinched the Speedway World Championship in 2010 after securing the championship in Terenzano, Italy. He is only the second Pole to ever win the World Championship, following in the footsteps of Jerzy Szczakiel who won in 1973.

Gollob also spent some time in Australia in the early-mid 1990s based at the North Arm Speedway in Adelaide. While in Australia, Gollob would race against many of his future World Championship rivals including Jason Crump, Leigh Adams, and Ryan Sullivan. Gollob is the only World Champion to win the Jack Young Solo Cup held in Adelaide each year in memory of Australia's 1951 and 1952 World Champion, Jack Young. He won the cup in 1995 at North Arm.

On 28 July 1996, Gollob won the Continental Final, which formed part of the 1997 Speedway Grand Prix Qualification.

Gollob was also a member of the Poland speedway team that won the World Team Cup in 1996 and the World Cup in 2005, 2007, 2009, 2010, 2011.

In 2007, Gollob survived a plane crash with fellow rider Rune Holta. The plane, flown by his father Władysław, crashed on the way to a speedway meeting at Tarnów. Gollob escaped with cuts and bruises after pulling his father from the wreckage.

On retirement, Gollob had achieved 22 Grand Prix wins from 1995 until 2012.

In 2017, Gollob suffered serious injuries to head and spine in a motocross accident during a MX event in Northern Poland.

For his sport achievements, Gollob received the Order of Polonia Restituta:

- Knight's Cross (5th Class) in 2000
- Officer's Cross (4th Class) in 2007
- Commander's Cross (2010)

== World final appearances ==
=== Individual World Championship ===
- 1993 - (Germany) Pocking, Rottalstadion - 7th - 8pts
- 1994 - (Denmark) Vojens, Speedway Center - 16th - 0pts

=== World Pairs Championship ===
- 1993 - (Denmark) Vojens, Speedway Center (with Piotr Świst / Piotr Baron) - 5th - 15pts (15)

=== World Team Cup ===
- 1994 - (Germany) Brokstedt, Holsteinring Brokstedt - 2nd - 20pts (16)
- 1995 - (Poland) Bydgoszcz, Polonia Bydgoszcz Stadium - 6th - 13pts (12)
- 1996 - (Germany) Diedenbergen, Speedway Arena Diedenbergen - Winner - 27pts (15)
- 1997 - (Poland) Piła, Stadion Żużlowy Centrum - 2nd - 25pts (13)
- 1998 - (Denmark) Vojens, Speedway Center - 4th - 17pts (15)

=== World Cup ===
- 2001 - (Poland) Wrocław, Olympic Stadium - 2nd - 65pts (27)
- 2002 - Peterborough, East of England Showground - 4th - 48pts (17)
- 2003 - (Denmark) Vojens, Speedway Center - 4th - 49pts (20)
- 2004 - (England) Poole, Poole Stadium - 4th - 22pts (1)
- 2005 - (Poland) Wrocław, Olympic Stadium - Winner - 62pts
- 2007 - (Poland) Leszno, Alfred Smoczyk Stadium - Winner - 55pts
- 2008 - (Denmark) Vojens, Speedway Center - 2nd - 46pts
- 2009 - (Poland) Leszno, Alfred Smoczyk Stadium - Winner - 44pts
- 2010 - (Denmark) Vojens, Speedway Center - Winner - 46pts

=== Individual Under-21 World Championship ===
- 1992 - (Germany) Pfaffenhofen an der Ilm, Speedway Stadion Pfaffenhofen - 5th - 10pts

== Speedway Grand Prix results ==
Year	Position	Points	Best Finish	Notes
1995	9th	73	Winner	Won Polish Grand Prix
1996	12th	43	3rd	
1997	3rd	92	Winner	Won Swedish Grand Prix
1998	3rd	97	Winner	Won Polish Grand Prix
1999	2nd	98	Winner	Won Czech Republic Grand Prix and Polish Grand Prix
2000	7th	64	5th	
2001	3rd	89	Winner	Won German Grand Prix
2002	7th	117	Winner	Won Polish Grand Prix
2003	6th	111	Winner	Won Polish Grand Prix
2004	6th	113	Winner	Won Polish Grand Prix
2005	7th	83	Winner	Won Polish Grand Prix
2006	8th	94	3rd	
2007	4th	108	Winner	Won Polish Grand Prix
2008	3rd	148	Winner	Won Slovenian, Danish and German Grand Prix
2009	2nd	144	Winner	Won Scandinavian and Italian Grand Prix
2010	1st	166	Winner	Won Czech Republic, Polish, Nordic and Italian Grand Prix
2011	5th	106	Winner	Won Danish Grand Prix
2012	4th	142	Winner	Won Scandinavian Grand Prix
2013	9th	89	2nd	

== Family ==
Gollob has two brothers and one sister.

Gollob's brother Jacek was also a speedway rider.

== See also ==
- Poland national speedway team
- List of Speedway Grand Prix riders
- Speedway in Poland
