= List of Speedway World Cup meetings by city =

This is a list of Speedway World Cup meetings by the city hosted. The Speedway World Cup is a motorcycle speedway event for national teams.

== Czech Republic (2) ==
=== Prague (2) ===
- 2013 Speedway World Cup Race-off
- 2013 Speedway World Cup Final

== Denmark (15) ==
=== Holsted (2) ===
- 2003 Speedway World Cup Event 1
- 2003 Speedway World Cup Event 3

=== Outrup (2) ===
- 2003 Speedway World Cup Event 2
- 2003 Speedway World Cup Race-off

=== Vojens (11) ===
- 2003 Speedway World Cup Final
- 2007 Speedway World Cup Event 1
- 2008 Speedway World Cup Race-off
- 2008 Speedway World Cup Final
- 2009 Speedway World Cup Event 1
- 2010 Speedway World Cup Race-off
- 2010 Speedway World Cup Final
- 2011 Speedway World Cup Event 1
- 2015 Speedway World Cup Race-off
- 2015 Speedway World Cup Final
- 2016 Speedway World Cup Event 1

== Germany (1) ==
=== Landshut (1) ===
- 2026 Speedway World Cup Semi final 1

== Great Britain (24) ==
=== Coventry (2) ===
- 2007 Speedway World Cup Event 2
- 2008 Speedway World Cup Event 2

=== Eastbourne (3) ===
- 2002 Speedway World Cup Event 3
- 2004 Speedway World Cup Event 1
- 2004 Speedway World Cup Event 2

=== King's Lynn (7) ===
- 2010 Speedway World Cup Event 2
- 2011 Speedway World Cup Event 2
- 2012 Speedway World Cup Event 2
- 2013 Speedway World Cup Event 2
- 2014 Speedway World Cup Event 1
- 2015 Speedway World Cup Event 2
- 2017 Speedway World Cup Event 1

=== Manchester (2) ===
- 2016 Speedway World Cup Race-off
- 2016 Speedway World Cup Final

=== Peterborough (3) ===
- 2002 Speedway World Cup Race-off
- 2002 Speedway World Cup Final
- 2009 Speedway World Cup Event 2

=== Poole (3) ===
- 2002 Speedway World Cup Event 2
- 2004 Speedway World Cup Race-off
- 2004 Speedway World Cup Final

=== Reading (2) ===
- 2006 Speedway World Cup Race-off
- 2006 Speedway World Cup Final

=== Sheffield (1) ===
- 2002 Speedway World Cup Event 1

=== Swindon (1) ===
- 2005 Speedway World Cup Event 1

== Latvia (1) ==
=== Riga (1) ===
- 2026 Speedway World Cup Semi final 2

== Poland (26) ==
=== Bydgoszcz (1) ===
- 2012 Speedway World Cup Event 1

=== Częstochowa (1) ===
- 2013 Speedway World Cup Event 1

=== Gdańsk (3) ===
- 2001 Speedway World Cup Qualifying round 1
- 2001 Speedway World Cup Qualifying round 2
- 2001 Speedway World Cup Qualifying round 3

=== Gniezno (1) ===
- 2015 Speedway World Cup Event 1

=== Gorzów Wielkopolski (3) ===
- 2010 Speedway World Cup Event 1
- 2011 Speedway World Cup Race-off
- 2011 Speedway World Cup Final

=== Leszno (7) ===
- 2007 Speedway World Cup Race-off
- 2007 Speedway World Cup Final
- 2008 Speedway World Cup Event 1
- 2009 Speedway World Cup Race-off
- 2009 Speedway World Cup Final
- 2017 Speedway World Cup Race-off
- 2017 Speedway World Cup final

=== Rybnik (1) ===
- 2006 Speedway World Cup Event 1

=== Warszawa (1) ===
- 2026 Speedway World Cup Final

=== Wrocław (8) ===
- 2001 Speedway World Cup Race-off
- 2001 Speedway World Cup Final
- 2005 Speedway World Cup Race-off
- 2005 Speedway World Cup Final
- 2023 Speedway World Cup semi-final 1
- 2023 Speedway World Cup semi-final 2
- 2023 Speedway World Cup race-off
- 2023 Speedway World Cup Final

== Sweden (7) ==
=== Eskilstuna (1) ===
- 2005 Speedway World Cup Event 2

=== Målilla (3) ===
- 2006 Speedway World Cup Event 2
- 2012 Speedway World Cup Race-off
- 2012 Speedway World Cup Final

=== Västervik (3) ===
- 2014 Speedway World Cup Event 2
- 2016 Speedway World Cup Event 2
- 2017 Speedway World Cup Event 2

== See also ==
- List of Speedway Grands Prix
- Speedway World Cup
