= 2009 Speedway World Cup =

50th edition of the annual motorcycle speedway World Cup competition

Speedway World Cup
- Venue: Alfred Smoczyk Stadium
- Location: Poland
- Start date: 11 July
- End date: 19 July
- Nations: 8

Champions
- Poland

The 2009 FIM Speedway World Cup (SWC) was the ninth FIM Speedway World Cup season. The final took place on 19 July 2009 in Leszno, Poland. The defending World Champions were Denmark who won the 2008 final in Vojens, Denmark. It was the fourth final to be held in Poland, and the second in the Alfred Smoczyk Stadium after the 2007 final was held there when Poland beat Denmark, Australia and Great Britain. Poland won the 2009 Speedway World Cup.

== Qualification ==
Fourteen teams attempted to qualify for the 2009 Speedway World Cup. The top six nations (Denmark, Poland, Sweden, Australia, Great Britain and Russia) from the 2008 Speedway World Cup were granted automatic qualification, with the remaining two places divided among two qualifying rounds. Qualifying Round 1 was won by Slovenia and Qualifying Round 2 was won by the Czech Republic. The Czech Republic took part in the 2008 tournament, but it was the first time Slovenia had qualified since 2003.

- Qualifying Round 1
- 2 May 2009
- (Italy) Pista Olimpia Terenzano, Terenzano

Pos.	National team	Pts
1	Slovenia	51+3
2	Germany	51+2
3	Italy	26
4	Hungary	22

- Qualifying Round 2
- 2 May 2009
- (Latvia) Stadium Lokomotīve, Daugavpils

Pos.	National team	Pts
1	Czech Republic	48
2	Latvia	45
3	Finland	29
4	United States	26

=== Qualified teams ===
Team	Qualified as	Finals Appearance	Last Appearance	2008 place
Denmark	2008 SWC top six	9th	2008	1st
Poland	2008 SWC top six	9th	2008	2nd
Sweden	2008 SWC top six	9th	2008	3rd
Australia	2008 SWC top six	9th	2008	4th
Great Britain	2008 SWC top six	9th	2008	5th
Russia	2008 SWC top six	7th	2008	6th
Czech Republic	QR 2 Winner	8th	2008	7th
Slovenia	QR 1 Winner	4th	2003	—

== Venues ==
City	Stadium names	Capacity	Competition Stage
Vojens	Speedway Center	22,000	Event 1
Peterborough	East of England Showground	5,000	Event 2
Leszno	Alfred Smoczyk Stadium	25,000	Race-off and the Final

== Squads ==
Squads for the 2009 Speedway World Cup consisted of 10 riders; the same as the previous tournament in 2008. Each participating national association had to confirm its 10-riders one month before the first tournament meeting.

== Tournament ==
Semifinals
11 July - Vojens (details)
Russia	51
Sweden	47
Denmark	45
Czech Republic	12
13 July - Peterborough (details)
Poland	54
Australia	52
Great Britain	34
Slovenia	13

Race-off
16 July - Leszno (details)
Australia	51
Sweden	39
Great Britain	35
Denmark	34

Final
19 July - Leszno (details)
Poland	44
Australia	43
Sweden	36
Russia	35

== Final classification ==
Pos.	National team	Pts.
Gold	Poland	44
Silver	Australia	43
Bronze	Sweden	36
4	Russia	35
5	Great Britain	35
6	Denmark	34
7	Slovenia	13
8	Czech Republic	12

== See also ==
- 2009 Speedway Grand Prix
- 2009 Team Speedway Junior World Championship
