= 2015 Speedway World Cup Event 1 =

2015 FIM Speedway World Cup – Event 1
Information
- Date: 6 June 2015
- City: Gniezno
- Event: 1 of 4
- Referee: Craig Ackroyd

Stadium details
- Stadium: Stadion Miejski
- Capacity: 10,000
- Length: 348 m
- Track: speedway track

SWC Results

Event One of the 2015 Monster Energy FIM Speedway World Cup was the opening race of the 2015 edition of the Speedway World Cup. It was run on June 6 at Stadion Miejski in Gniezno, Poland and was won by Sweden from hosts Poland, Russia, and the Czech Republic. As a result, Sweden progressed directly to the 2015 Speedway World Cup Final, while Poland and Russia progressed to the 2015 Speedway World Cup Race-off. The Czech Republic were eliminated.

Sweden were led to victory by Linus Sundström and Antonio Lindbäck, both of whom scored double figures. They were supported by Peter Ljung and Andreas Jonsson, who scored nine and eight points respectively. The meeting was somewhat overshadowed by an injury to Polish captain Jarosław Hampel, who broke his leg in two places after colliding with Russia's Vitaly Belousov in just the fourth heat of the meeting. As a result, Poland were forced to ride the rest of the meeting with just three riders.

== Results ==
Pos.	National team	Pts.
1	Sweden	40
2	Poland	36
3	Russia	27
4	Czech Republic	20

== Scores ==
(Sweden)	SWEDEN	40
No	Rider Name	Pts.	Heats
1	Antonio Lindbäck	11	2,1,3,3,2
2	Andreas Jonsson	8	3,0,3,1,1
3	Linus Sundström	12	3,2,1,3,3
4	Peter Ljung	9	1,3,2,1,2

(Poland)	POLAND	36
No	Rider Name	Pts.	Heats
1	Jarosław Hampel	0	F,-,-,-,-
2	Przemysław Pawlicki	13	3,3,2,2,3
3	Maciej Janowski	13	2,3,2,3,3
4	Bartosz Zmarzlik	10	3,3,1,0,3

(Russia)	RUSSIA	27
No	Rider Name	Pts.	Heats
1	Andrey Kudryashov	2
2	Artem Laguta	11
3	Renat Gafurov	5
4	Vitaly Belousov	9

(Czech Republic)	CZECH REPUBLIC	20
No	Rider Name	Pts.	Heats
1	Václav Milík	12
2	Eduard Krčmář	2
3	Tomáš Suchánek	3
4	Matěj Kůs	3

== See also ==
- 2015 Speedway Grand Prix
