= 2009 Speedway World Cup Event 2 =

FIM Tobet Speedway World Cup – Event 2
Information
- Date: 13 July 2009
- City: Peterborough
- Event: 2 of 4 (37)
- Referee: Pavel Vana
- Jury President: Christer Bergstrøm

Stadium details
- Stadium: East of England Showground
- Capacity: 2,200
- Length: 336 m
- Track: speedway track

SWC Results
Winner		Poland - 54 pts
Runner-up		Australia - 52 pts
3rd place		Great Britain - 34 pts
4th place		Slovenia - 13 pts

The FIM Tobet Speedway World Cup – Event 2 was the second meeting of the 2009 Speedway World Cup tournament. It took place on 13 July 2009 in the East of England Showground in Peterborough, Great Britain.

The meeting was won by the Polish team and they qualified directly for the World Cup Final in Leszno, Poland. Australia and host team Great Britain qualified for the Race-Off. The last placed team, Slovenia, were knocked out of the competition.

== Results ==
Pos.	National team	Pts.
1	Poland	54
2	Australia	52
3	Great Britain	34
4	Slovenia	13

As a Teams Declared was two changes. Pole Sebastian Ułamek (who broke a shoulder blade riding in the Swedish Elitserien) was replaced by Krzysztof Kasprzak. Polish manager Marek Cieślak said: I watched the Polish Championship semi-final where Krzysztof scored 13 points. He also had a very good performance in the Polish Ekstraliga before that. Injured was Australian Rory Schlein, who broke a collarbone and wrist in the British Elite League. Teenage Darcy Ward was an option, but he was injured also. Schlein will be replaced by Davey Watt.

It will be a SWC debut for five riders: two the British Lewis Bridger and Daniel King, one Pole Adrian Miedziński and two Slovenian riders Aleksander Čonda and Maks Gregorič.

== Heat details ==
Placing	Team / Rider Name	Total	1	2	3	4	5	6	7	8	9	10	11	12	13	14	15	16	17	18	19	20	21	22	23	24	25
1	Poland	54	2	4	5	8	11	12	15	16	17	19	22	24	27	30	32	34	37	40	43	44	47	48	51	54	54
1	(1) Tomasz Gollob (c)	9	2							1						3			3								M
1	(2) Krzysztof Kasprzak	11		2							1						2			3			3
1	(3) Piotr Protasiewicz	10			1							2	3								3			1
1	(4) Adrian Miedziński	10				3		1						2								1			3
1	(5) Jarosław Hampel	14					3		3						3			2								3
2	Australia	52	1	4	7	9	11	13	15	18	21	24	25	26	28	29	32	35	37	38	40	43	43	45	47	49	52
2	(1) Ryan Sullivan	7	1					2					1					3					0
2	(2) Davey Watt	10		3					2					1					2					2
2	(3) Leigh Adams (c)	11			3					3					2					1					2
2	(4) Chris Holder	10				2					3					1					2					2
2	(5) Jason Crump	14					2					3					3					3					3
Placing	Team / Rider Name	Total	1	2	3	4	5	6	7	8	9	10	11	12	13	14	15	16	17	18	19	20	21	22	23	24	25
3	Great Britain	34	0	1	3	4	5	8	9	11	11	12	14	20	21	23	24	25	26	28	29	29	30	30	31	32	34
3	(1) Edward Kennett	3	0						1								1				-				1
3	(2) Lewis Bridger	6		1						2			2									0				1
3	(3) Chris Harris (c)	11			2						0			6J				1									2
3	(4) Tai Woffinden	5				1						1			1				1				1
3	(5) Daniel King	9					1	3								2				2	1			E
4	Slovenia	13	3	3	3	3	3	3	3	3	5	5	5	5	5	5	5	5	5	5	5	7	9	12	12	12	13
4	(1) Matej Žagar (c)	10	3								2				M				0J			2		3
4	(2) Denis Štojs	0		0								0				0		–							0
4	(3) Izak Šantej	0			0			0									0		-							0
4	(4) Maks Gregorič	1				0			0				0							0							1
4	(5) Aleksander Čonda	2					0			0				0				0			0		2
Placing	Team / Rider Name	Total	1	2	3	4	5	6	7	8	9	10	11	12	13	14	15	16	17	18	19	20	21	22	23	24	25

M - exclusion for exceeding two minute time allowance • T - exclusion for touching the tapes • X - other exclusion • E - retired or mechanical failure • F - fell

Helmet colours was permanent for each teams (Red, Blue, White and Yellow/Black). Colours in diagrams means gate positions:
gate A – inside	gate B	gate C	gate D – outside

=== Heat after heat ===
1. Žagar, Gollob, Sullivan, Kennett
2. Watt, Kasprzak, Bridger, Štojs
3. Adams, Harris, Protasiewicz, Šantej
4. Miedziński, Holder, Woffinden, Gregorič
5. Hampel, Crump, King, Čonda
6. King, Sullivan, Miedziński, Šantej
7. Hampel, Watt, Kennett, Gregorič
8. Adams, Bridger, Gollob, Čonda
9. Holder, Žagar, Kasprzak, Harris
10. Crump, Protasiewicz, Woffinden, Štojs
11. Protasiewicz, Bridger, Sullivan, Gregorič
12. Harris (6 pts), Miedziński, Watt, Čonda
  Harris as Joker.
13. Hampel, Adams, Woffinden, Žagar (M)
  Žagar excluded - delayed the start.
14. Gollob, King, Holder, Štojs
15. Crump, Kasprzak, Kennett, Šantej
16. Sullivan, Hampel, Harris, Čonda
17. Gollob, Watt, Woffinden, Žagar (0 pts)
  Žagar as Joker.
18. Kasprzak, King, Adams, Gregorič
19. Protasiewicz, Holder, King, Čonda
20. Crump, Zagar, Miedziński, Bridger
21. Kasprzak, Čonda, Woffinden, Sullivan
22. Zagar, Watt, Protasiewicz, King (E/start)
23. Miedziński, Adams, Kennett, Štojs
24. Hampel, Holder, Bridger, Šantej
25. Crump, Harris, Gregorič, Gollob (M)
  Gollob excluded due to delaying the start.

== See also ==
- 2009 Speedway World Cup
- motorcycle speedway
