= 2015 Speedway World Cup Event 2 =

2015 FIM Speedway World Cup – Event 2
Information
- Date: 8 June 2015
- City: King's Lynn
- Event: 2 of 4
- Referee: Piotr Liz

Stadium details
- Stadium: Adrian Flux Arena
- Capacity: 8,500
- Length: 342 m
- Track: speedway track

SWC Results

Event Two of the 2015 Monster Energy FIM Speedway World Cup was the second race of the 2015 edition of the Speedway World Cup. It was run on June 8 at the Adrian Flux Arena in King's Lynn, Great Britain and was won by Australia from hosts Great Britain, the United States, and Latvia. As a result, Australia progressed directly to the 2015 Speedway World Cup Final, while Great Britain and the United States progressed to the 2015 Speedway World Cup Race-off. Latvia were eliminated.

Australia were led to victory by Jason Doyle, and he was well supported by Nick Morris, Troy Batchelor and former world champion Chris Holder. Tai Woffinden and Chris Harris top scored for the hosts, while reigning world champion Greg Hancock starred for the United States.

== Results ==
| Pos. | National team | Pts. |
|---|---|---|
| 1 | Australia | 47 |
| 2 | Great Britain | 43 |
| 3 | United States | 22 |
| 4 | Latvia | 9 |

== Scores ==
| (Australia) | AUSTRALIA | 47 |
| No | Rider Name | Pts. | Heats |
| 1 | Chris Holder | 11 | 3,3,1,2,2 |
| 2 | Nick Morris | 12 | 2,2,3,2,3 |
| 3 | Troy Batchelor | 11 | 2,2,1,3,3 |
| 4 | Jason Doyle | 13 | 2,3,3,2,3 |

| (United Kingdom) | GREAT BRITAIN | 43 |
| No | Rider Name | Pts. | Heats |
| 1 | Chris Harris | 13 | 3,3,2,3,2 |
| 2 | Danny King | 10 | 2,2,2,3,1 |
| 3 | Tai Woffinden | 13 | 3,1,3,3,3 |
| 4 | Robert Lambert | 7 | 1,0,2,2,2 |

| (United States) | UNITED STATES | 22 |
| No | Rider Name | Pts. | Heats |
| 1 | Greg Hancock | 12 | 3,3,2,3,0,1 |
| 2 | Gino Manzares | 4 | 1,1,1,1,0 |
| 3 | Ryan Fisher | 5 | 1,0,2,1,1 |
| 4 | Max Ruml | 1 | 0,0,1,0 |

| (Latvia) | LATVIA | 9 |
| No | Rider Name | Pts. | Heats |
| 1 | Maksims Bogdanovs | 3 | 0,1,0,1,1 |
| 2 | Andžejs Ļebedevs | 5 | 0,2,1,0,0,2 |
| 3 | Kjasts Puodžuks | 1 | 1,0,0,0,0 |
| 4 | Jevgeņijs Kostigovs | 0 | 0,0,0,0 |
