= 2017 Speedway World Cup =

58th edition of the annual motorcycle speedway World Cup competition

Speedway World Cup
- Venue: Stadion im. Alfreda Smoczyka
- Location: Poland
- Start date: 1 July
- End date: 8 July
- Nations: 9

Champions
- Poland

The 2017 Monster Energy FIM Speedway World Cup (SWC) was the seventeenth Speedway World Cup, the annual international motorcycle speedway world championship tournament organised by the FIM. The next edition would not be held until six years later in 2023. The 2017 event took place between 1 July and 8 July 2017 and involved nine national teams. Poland successfully defended their 2016 title.

== Qualification ==
(Latvia) Stadium Lokomotīve, Daugavpils - 25 June 2017

National team	Pts	Scorers
Latvia	52	Andžejs Ļebedevs 15, Kjasts Puodžuks 14, Maksims Bogdanovs 13, Jevgeņijs Kostigovs 10
France	36	David Bellego 17, Dimitri Bergé 10, Mathieu Trésarrieu 8, Stéphane Trésarrieu 1, Jordan Dubernard 0
Germany	24	Kai Huckenbeck 11, Ronny Weis 5, Richard Geyer 5, René Deddens 3
Italy	13	Guglielmo Franchetti 6, Daniele Tessari 4, Paco Castagna 3, Alessandro Milanese 0

== Qualified teams ==
Team	Qualified as	Finals appearance	Last appearance	2016 place
Poland	Host	17th	2016	1
Great Britain	2016 SWC top eight	17th	2016	2
Sweden	2016 SWC top eight	17th	2016	3
Australia	2016 SWC top eight	17th	2016	4
Denmark	2016 SWC top eight	17th	2016	5
Russia	2016 SWC top eight	14th	2016	6
United States	2016 SWC top eight	10th	2016	7
Czech Republic	2016 SWC top eight	16th	2016	8
Latvia	Qualifying Round Winner	4th	2015	QR

== Tournament ==
Semifinals
July 1 — (England) King's Lynn (details)
Great Britain	53
Australia	44
United States	15
Czech Republic	13
July 4 — (Sweden) Västervik (details)
Sweden	37
Russia	30
Latvia	28+3
Denmark	28+2

Race-off
July 7 — (Poland) Leszno (details)
Russia	46
Australia	33
Latvia	30
United States	15

Final
July 8 — (Poland) Leszno (details)
Poland	50
Sweden	42
Russia	18
Great Britain	15

== Final classification ==
Pos.	National team	Pts.
Gold	Poland	50
Silver	Sweden	42
Bronze	Russia	18
4	Great Britain	15
5	Australia	33
6	Latvia	30
7	United States	15
8	Denmark	28
9	Czech Republic	13
