= 2009 Speedway World Cup Event 1 =

Event of the annual speedway-motorycle World Cup competition

2009 FIM Speedway World Cup – Event 1
Information
- Date: 11 July 2009
- City: Vojens
- Event: 1 of 4 (36)
- Referee: Marek Wojaczek
- Jury President: Christer Bergstrøm

Stadium details
- Stadium: Speedway Center
- Capacity: 22,000
- Length: 300 m
- Track: speedway track

SWC Results
Winner		Russia - 51 pts
Runner-up		Sweden - 47 pts
3rd place		Denmark - 45 pts
4th place		Czech Republic - 12 pts

The 2009 Speedway World Cup Event 1 was the first meeting of the 2009 Speedway World Cup tournament. It took place on 11 July 2009 in the Speedway Center in Vojens, Denmark. The meeting was won by the Russian team and they qualified directly for the World Cup Final in Leszno, Poland. Sweden and host team Denmark qualified for the Race-Off. The last placed team, the Czech Republic, were knocked out of the competition.

== Results ==
Pos.	National team	Pts.
1	Russia	51
2	Sweden	47
3	Denmark	45
4	Czech Republic	12

== Heat details ==
Placing	Team / Rider name	Total	1	2	3	4	5	6	7	8	9	10	11	12	13	14	15	16	17	18	19	20	21	22	23	24	25
1	Russia	51	2	5	7	9	11	12	12	15	18	20	23	24	26	29	29	32	34	36	39	42	43	46	47	50	51
1	(1) Roman Povazhny	10	2					1					3					3					1
1	(2) Denis Gizatullin (c)	9		3					0					1					2					3
1	(3) Renat Gafurov	10			2					3					2					2					1
1	(4) Emil Sayfutdinov	14				2					3					3					3					3
1	(5) Grigory Laguta	8					2					2					Fx					3					1
2	Sweden	47	0	2	5	6	9	12	15	16	17	18	19	22	23	25	28	30	30	33	35	37	39	39	43	44	47
2	(1) Antonio Lindbäck	6	0							1						2			0								3
2	(2) Fredrik Lindgren	11		2							1						3			3			2
2	(3) David Ruud	7			3							1	1								2			0
2	(4) Andreas Jonsson (c)	13				1		3						3								2			4J
2	(5) Jonas Davidsson	10					3		3						1			2								1
Placing	Team / Rider name	Total	1	2	3	4	5	6	7	8	9	10	11	12	13	14	15	16	17	18	19	20	21	22	23	24	25
3	Denmark	45	3	4	5	8	8	10	12	14	16	19	21	23	26	27	27	28	31	32	32	32	35	37	43	43	45
3	(1) Nicki Pedersen	5	3						2								F/N				N				-
3	(2) Bjarne Pedersen	5		1						2			2									0				0
3	(3) Nicolai Klindt	8			1						2			2				1									2
3	(4) Kenneth Bjerre	21				3						3			3				3				3		6J
3	(5) Niels Kristian Iversen	6					0	2								1				1				2
4	Czech Republic	12	1	1	1	1	2	2	3	3	3	3	3	3	3	3	5	5	6	6	7	8	8	10	10	12	12
4	(1) Aleš Dryml, Jr. (c)	4	1								0				0							1		2J
4	(2) Adrian Rymel	0		T								0				0		0							0
4	(3) Lukáš Dryml	5			0			F3									2		1							2
4	(4) Josef Franc	1				0			1				0							0							0
4	(5) Matěj Kůs	2					1			0				0							1		0
Placing	Team / Rider name	Total	1	2	3	4	5	6	7	8	9	10	11	12	13	14	15	16	17	18	19	20	21	22	23	24	25

M - exclusion for exceeding two minute time allowance • T - exclusion for touching the tapes • X - other exclusion • E - retired or mechanical failure • F - fell

Helmet colours were permanent for each team (red, blue, white and yellow/black). Colours in tables show gate positions:
gate A – inside	gate B	gate C	gate D – outside

=== Heat after heat ===
1. N.Pedersen, Povazhny, A.Dryml, Lindbäck
2. Gizatullin, Lindgren, B.Pedersen, Rymel (T)
3. Ruud, Gafurov, Klindt, L.Dryml
4. Bjerre, Sayfutdinov, Jonsson, Franc
5. Davidsson, Laguta, Kůs, Iversen
  Iversen - bail on first corner
6. Jonsson, Iversen, Povazhny, L.Dryml (F3)
7. Davidsson, N.Pedersen, Franc, Gizatullin
8. Gafurov, B.Pedersen, Lindbäck, Kůs
  Damp track - rain started
9. Sayfutdinov, Klindt, Lindgren, A.Dryml
  Race restart - false start
10. Bjerre, Laguta, Ruud, Rymel
11. Povazhny, B.Pedersen, Ruud, Franc
12. Jonsson, Klindt, Gizatullin, Kůs
13. Bjerre, Gafurov, Davidsson, A.Dryml
14. Sayfutdinov, Lindbäck, Iversen, Rymel
15. Lindgren, L.Dryml, Pedersen (F/N), Laguta (Fx)
  Race stopped - Pedersen and Laguta hooked together and crashed into barrier. Laguta excluded. Pedersen injured - no substitute.
16. Povazhny, Davidsson, Klindt, Rymel
17. Bjerre, Gizatullin, L.Dryml, Lindbäck
18. Lindgren, Gafurov, Iversen, Franc
19. Sayfutdinov, Ruud, Kůs
20. Laguta, Jonsson, A.Dryml, B.Pedersen
21. Bjerre, Lindgren, Povazhny, Kůs
  Wet track - more rain
22. Gizatullin, Iversen, A.Dryml (2 pts), Ruud
23. Bjerre (6 pts), Jonsson (4 pts), Gafurov, Rymel
24. Sayfutdinov, L.Dryml, Davidsson, B.Pedersen
25. Lindbäck, Klindt, Laguta, Franc

== See also ==
- 2009 Speedway World Cup
- Motorcycle speedway
