= Matt Browne (speedway rider) =

American motorcycle speedway rider

- Born: April 15, 1983 (age 43)
- Nationality: American

Matt Browne (born 15 April 1983) is an American motorcycle speedway rider who was a member of United States team at 2007 Speedway World Cup but he did not start as reserve.

== Career details ==
- Team World Championship (Speedway World Team Cup and Speedway World Cup)
  - 2007 - 7th place (did not start as reserve)

== See also ==
- United States national speedway team
- Speedway World Cup
