= 2007 Speedway World Cup Event 2 =

Information
- Date: 16 July 2007
- City: Coventry
- Event: 2 of 4 (29)
- Referee: Istvan Darago

Stadium details
- Stadium: Brandon stadium

SWC Results
- Attendance: 5,000
- Best Time: (United Kingdom) Chris Harris; 59.68 secs (in Heat 6)
Winner		Great Britain - 60 pts
Runner-up		Sweden - 49 pts
3rd place		Russia - 27 pts
4th place		United States - 20 pts

The 2007 Speedway World Cup Event 1 was the first race of the 2007 Speedway World Cup season. It took place in July 2007 in the Brandon stadium in Coventry, Great Britain.

== Results ==
Pos.	National team	Pts.
1	Great Britain	60
2	Sweden	49
3	Russia	27
4	United States	20

== Heat details ==
Placing	Team / Rider Name	Total	1	2	3	4	5	6	7	8	9	10	11	12	13	14	15	16	17	18	19	20	21	22	23	24	25
1	Great Britain	60	0	2	5	8	11	14	17	19	22	25	28	30	31	34	37	39	41	44	46	49	52	53	54	57	60
1	(1) Lee Richardson	11	0					3					3					2					3
1	(2) Simon Stead	10		2					3					2					2					1
1	(3) Edward Kennett	10			3					2					1					3					1
1	(4) Chris Harris	14				3					3					3					2					3
1	(5) Scott Nicholls	15					3					3					3					3					3
1	(6) Oliver Allen	-
2	Sweden	49	1	4	6	8	10	10	11	14	16	17	19	25	28	28	28	31	32	34	37	39	41	44	46	48	49
2	(1) Fredrik Lindgren	12	1								2				3				1			2		3
2	(2) Peter Karlsson	9		3								1				0		3							2
2	(3) Antonio Lindbäck	2			2			F
2	(4) Mikael Max	8				2			1				2							2							1
2	(5) Jonas Davidsson	16					2			3				6J							3		2
2	(6) Magnus Karlsson	2															0		-							2
Placing	Team / Rider Name	Total	1	2	3	4	5	6	7	8	9	10	11	12	13	14	15	16	17	18	19	20	21	22	23	24	25
3	Russia	27	2	3	3	4	5	6	6	7	7	9	11	12	12	14	15	16	19	20	20	21	22	24	24	25	27
3	(1) Denis Gizatullin	11	2							1						2			3							1	2
3	(2) Sergey Darkin	2		1							0						1			F/-
3	(3) Emil Saifutdinov	6			0							2	2J								X			2
3	(4) Roman Ivanov	4				1		1						1								1			0
3	(5) Renat Gafurov	2					1		E						0			1								-
3	(6) Daniil Ivanov	2																		1			1
4	United States	20	3	3	4	4	4	6	8	8	9	9	9	9	13	14	16	16	16	16	17	17	17	17	20	20	20
4	(1) Greg Hancock	15	3						2						4J		2				1				3
4	(2) Charlie Venegas	0		0						0			0									-				0
4	(3) Chris Kerr	2			1						1			X				X				0					0
4	(4) Tommy Hedden	0				0						0			-				-				0
4	(5) Billy Janniro	3					0	2								1			0	X				0
4	(6) Matt Browne	-
Placing	Team / Rider Name	Total	1	2	3	4	5	6	7	8	9	10	11	12	13	14	15	16	17	18	19	20	21	22	23	24	25

M - exclusion for exceeding two minute time allowance • T - exclusion for touching the tapes • X - other exclusion • E - retired or mechanical failure • F - fell

Helmet colours was permanent for each teams (Red, Blue, White and Yellow/Black). Colours in diagrams means gate positions:
gate A – inside	gate B	gate C	gate D – outside

== See also ==
- 2007 Speedway World Cup
- motorcycle speedway
