= 2015 Speedway World Cup =

56th edition of the annual motorcycle speedway World Cup competition

Speedway World Cup
- Venue: Vojens
- Location: Denmark
- Start date: 6 June
- End date: 14 June
- Nations: 9

Champions
- Sweden

The 2015 Monster Energy FIM Speedway World Cup (SWC) was the fifteenth FIM Speedway World Cup, the annual international speedway world championship tournament. It took place between 6 June and 14 June 2015 and involved nine national teams. It was won by Sweden, the first time they have achieved success since 2004. They beat hosts and defending champions Denmark by two points, while Poland edged out Australia to claim third.

== Qualification ==
(Germany) Ellermühle Speedway Stadium, Landshut - 9 May 2015

National team	Pts	Scorers
Russia	40	Emil Sayfutdinov 12, Vitaly Belousov 11, Viktor Kulakov 10, Vadim Tarasenko 7
Germany	34	Martin Smolinski 20, Michael Hartel 8, Christian Hefenbrock 6, Tobias Busch 0
Slovenia	32	Matej Žagar 17, Maks Gregorič 11, Ziga Kovacić 3, Aleksander Čonda 1
Italy	17	Nicolás Covatti 7, Paco Castagna 7, Alessandro Milanese 3, Nicolas Vicentin 2

== Qualified teams ==
Team	Qualified as	Finals appearance	Last appearance	2014 place
Denmark	Host	15th	2014	1
Poland	2014 SWC top eight	15th	2014	2
Australia	2014 SWC top eight	15th	2014	3
Great Britain	2014 SWC top eight	15th	2014	4
Sweden	2014 SWC top eight	15th	2014	5
United States	2014 SWC top eight	8th	2014	6
Czech Republic	2014 SWC top eight	14th	2014	7
Latvia	2014 SWC top eight	3rd	2014	8
Russia	Qualifying Round Winner	12th	2013	QR

== Tournament ==
Semifinals
June 6 — (Poland) Gniezno (details)
Sweden	40
Poland	36
Russia	27
Czech Republic	20
June 8 — (United Kingdom) King's Lynn (details)
Australia	47
Great Britain	43
United States	22
Latvia	9

Race-off
June 11 — (Denmark) Vojens (details)
Poland	48
Great Britain	43
United States	22
Russia	11

Final
June 14 — (Denmark) Vojens (details)
Sweden	34
Denmark	32
Poland	27
Australia	26

The final was delayed from 13 Jun until 14 Jun after rain caused the meeting to be abandoned.

== Final classification ==
Pos.	National team	Pts.
Gold	Sweden	34
Silver	Denmark	32
Bronze	Poland	27
4	Australia	26
5	Great Britain	43
6	United States	22
7	Russia	11
8	Czech Republic	20
9	Latvia	9

== See also ==
- 2015 Speedway Grand Prix
