= 2017 Speedway World Cup Event 2 =

2017 FIM Speedway World Cup – Event 2
Information
- Date: 4 July 2017
- City: Västervik
- Event: 2 of 4

Stadium details
- Stadium: Stena Arena
- Capacity: 10,000
- Length: 296 m
- Track: speedway track

SWC Results
Winner		Sweden - 37 pts
Runner-up		Russia - 30 pts
3rd place		Latvia - 28+3 pts
4th place		Denmark - 28+2 pts

Event Two of the 2017 Monster Energy FIM Speedway World Cup was the second race of the 2017 edition of the Speedway World Cup. It was staged on July 4 at the Stena Arena in Västervik, Sweden and was won by Sweden from Russia, Latvia, and Denmark. As a result, Sweden progressed directly to the 2017 Speedway World Cup Final, while Russia and Latvia progressed to the 2017 Speedway World Cup Race-off. Denmark were eliminated.

Latvia and Denmark initially tied on 28 points after the 20 qualifying heats, however Andžejs Ļebedevs beat Niels-Kristian Iversen in a run-off to secure the Latvians place in the race-off. It was the first time since the Speedway World Cup was introduced in 2001 that Denmark had been eliminated at this stage.

Antonio Lindbäck and Fredrik Lindgren top scored for Sweden with 11 and 10 points respectively, while Grigory Laguta led Russia with a 12-point haul.

== Results ==
Pos.	National team	Pts.
1	Sweden	37
2	Russia	30
3	Latvia	28+3
4	Denmark	28+2

== Scores ==
(Sweden)	SWEDEN	37
No	Rider Name	Pts.	Heats
1	Fredrik Lindgren	10	3,0,1,3,3
2	Antonio Lindbäck	11	3,2,2,3,1
3	Andreas Jonsson	8	1,2,1,3,1
4	Linus Sundström	8	0,2,3,2,1
5	Joel Kling	0

(Russia)	RUSSIA	30
No	Rider Name	Pts.	Heats
1	Emil Sayfutdinov	10	2,3,1,1,3
2	Grigory Laguta	12	3,2,2,2,3
3	Vadim Tarasenko	7	1,3,2,1,0
4	Andrey Kudryashov	0	0,0,0
5	Gleb Chugunov	1	1,0

(Latvia)	LATVIA	28+3
No	Rider Name	Pts.	Heats
1	Andžejs Ļebedevs	15	1,1,3,6,2,2 + 3
2	Maksims Bogdanovs	4	3,1,0,0,0
3	Jevgeņijs Kostigovs	4	1,1,0,2
4	Kjasts Puodžuks	5	2,1,0,0,2
5

(Denmark)	DENMARK	28+2
No	Rider Name	Pts.	Heats
1	Kenneth Bjerre	6	0,3,3,0,0
2	Leon Madsen	6	2,0,2,1,1
3	Michael Jepsen Jensen	7	0,3,1,0,3
4	Niels-Kristian Iversen	9	2,0,3,2,2 + 2
5	Frederik Jakobsen	0

== See also ==
- 2017 Speedway Grand Prix
