= 2017 Speedway World Cup Race-off =

2017 FIM Speedway World Cup – Race Off
Information
- Date: 7 July 2017
- City: Leszno
- Event: 3 of 4

Stadium details
- Stadium: Alfred Smoczyk Stadium
- Capacity: 25,000
- Length: 330 m
- Track: speedway track

SWC Results
Winner		Russia - 46 pts
Runner-up		Australia - 33 pts
3rd place		Latvia - 30 pts
4th place		United States - 15 pts

The 2017 Monster Energy FIM Speedway World Cup Race Off was the third race of the 2017 edition of the Speedway World Cup. It was run on July 7 at the Alfred Smoczyk Stadium in Leszno, Poland and was won by Russia from Australia, Latvia and the United States. As a result, Russia progressed to the 2017 Speedway World Cup Final, where they will join defending champions and hosts Poland, Event One winners Great Britain and Event Two winners Sweden. Australia finished second, but were eliminated from the competition along with Latvia and the United States.

Emil Sayfutdinov led Russia to victory with a 15-point maximum, and he was well supported by Gleb Chugunov, Andrey Kudryashov and Vadim Tarasenko. The Russian team still made the final without Grigory Laguta, who was suspended in the build-up to the event after failing a doping test. Jason Doyle top scored with 12 points for Australia, while Andžejs Ļebedevs was the star for Latvia with 18 points.

== Results ==
Pos.	National team	Pts.
1	Russia	46
2	Australia	33
3	Latvia	30
4	United States	15

== Scores ==
(Russia)	RUSSIA	46
No	Rider Name	Pts.	Heats
1	Emil Sayfutdinov	15	3,3,3,3,3
2	Grigory Laguta	DNR
3	Vadim Tarasenko	10	3,1,2,3,1
4	Andrey Kudryashov	10	0,3,2,2,3
5	Gleb Chugunov	11	1,2,3,2,3

(Australia)	AUSTRALIA	33
No	Rider Name	Pts.	Heats
1	Jason Doyle	12	3,3,X,2,2,2
2	Sam Masters	2	1,1
3	Chris Holder	6	0,2,2,2
4	Troy Batchelor	7	2,3,2,X,0
5	Max Fricke	6	1,3,2

(Latvia)	LATVIA	30
No	Rider Name	Pts.	Heats
1	Kjasts Puodžuks	4	2,1,1,0,0
2	Jevgeņijs Kostigovs	6	2,0,1,1,2
3	Andžejs Ļebedevs	18	3,2,6,3,3,1
4	Maksims Bogdanovs	2	0,0,2,E
5

(United States)	UNITED STATES	15
No	Rider Name	Pts.	Heats
1	Ricky Wells	6	2,2,0,1,1
2	Gino Manzares	2	1,0,1,0
3	Luke Becker	4	1,0,0,3
4	Max Ruml	1	0,0,1
5	Broc Nicol	2	1,0,0,1

== See also ==
- 2017 Speedway Grand Prix
