= 2008 Speedway World Cup =

49th edition of the annual motorcycle speedway World Cup competition

FIM Nordicbet Speedway World Cup
- Venue: Vojens
- Location: Denmark
- Start date: 12 July
- End date: 19 July
- Nations: 8

Champions
- Denmark

The 2008 FIM Nordicbet Speedway World Cup (SWC) is the 8th FIM Speedway World Cup season. The final took place on 19 July 2008 in Vojens, Denmark. The tournament was won by host team Denmark (49 pts) and they beat defending champion Poland (46 pts), Sweden (39 pts) and Australia (21 pts) in the Final.

It was the second time the Speedway World Cup was won by Denmark and their thirteenth Team World Champion title overall. It was the second time Hans Andersen, Niels Kristian Iversen, Bjarne Pedersen and Nicki Pedersen had been members of a World Cup winning team (Champions in 2006, but it was the first time for Kenneth Bjerre.

== Calendar ==
Day	Venue	Winner	
Qualification
25 May	(Hungary) Borsod Volán Stadion, Miskolc	Hungary	result
29 June	(Slovenia) Ilirija Sports Park, Ljubljana	Czech Republic	result
Semi-Finals
12 July	(Poland) Alfred Smoczyk Stadium, Leszno	Australia	result
14 July	(England) Brandon Stadium, Coventry	Denmark	result
Race-Off
17 July	(Denmark) Vojens Speedway Center, Vojens	Sweden	result
Final
19 July	(Denmark) Vojens Speedway Center, Vojens	Denmark	result

== Qualification ==
The top 6 teams of the overall 2007 Speedway World Cup was directly seeded into the 2008 SWC Final Tournament: Poland (Rank #1 - the defending Champion), Denmark (#2), Australia (#3), Great Britain (#4), Sweden (#5) and Russia (#6). 2 other teams was shall qualify to the SWC through 2 preliminary rounds: Czech Republic (#7) and Hungary (#8).

In Preliminary Round 1, Hungary won with (51+3 points) after a run-off between Matej Ferjan and Tobias Kroner from Germany (51+2 pts). The last places were taken by Latvia (36 pts) and United States (12 pts) competing without Grand Prix rider Greg Hancock.

In Preliminary Round 2, the Czech Republic team won with (59 points). They beat Finland (40 pts), Slovenia (35 pts) and Italy (16 pts).

- Qualifying round 1
- (Hungary) Borsod Volán Stadion, Miskolc

Pos.	National team	Pts.
1	Hungary	51+3
2	Germany	51+e
3	Latvia	36
4	United States	12

- Qualifying round 2
- (Slovenia) Ilirija Sports Park, Ljubljana

Pos.	National team	Pts.
1	Czech Republic	59
2	Finland	40
3	Slovenia	35
4	Italy	16

== Tournament ==
The SWC Final Tournament was held by Poland (Event 1), Great Britain (Event 2) and Denmark (Race-Off and The Final). The first Semi-Final (Event 1) was held in Leszno, Poland. This meeting was won by Australia (56+3 points) after a Run-Off between Leigh Adams and Jarosław Hampel from Poland (56+2 points). In Event 2 in Coventry, Great Britain, the Denmark team won (63 points).

The Race-Off and the Final were held in Vojens, Denmark. The Swedish team won the Race-Off(53 points). Sweden and Poland (50 points) qualified for the Final. The last two places were taken by Great Britain (36 points) and Russia (17 points).

Semifinals
12 July - Leszno (details)
Australia	56+3
Poland	56+2
Russia	36
Hungary	10
14 July - Coventry (details)
Denmark	63
Sweden	50.5
Great Britain	25.5
Czech Republic	13

Race-off
17 July - Vojens (details)
Sweden	53
Poland	50
Great Britain	36
Russia	17

Final
19 July - Vojens
Denmark	49
Poland	46
Sweden	39
Australia	21

== Final ==
The 2008 Speedway World Cup Final took place on 19 July at the Speedway Center in Vojens. In the final the Denmark team won with 49 points beating Poland (46), Sweden (39) and Australia (21).

=== Results ===
Pos.	National team	Pts.
1	Denmark	49
2	Poland	46
3	Sweden	39
4	Australia	21

=== Heat details ===
Placing	Team / Rider name	Total	1	2	3	4	5	6	7	8	9	10	11	12	13	14	15	16	17	18	19	20	21	22	23	24	25
1	Denmark	49	3	5	6	7	9	12	15	15	15	17	20	21	23	24	27	28	30	33	35	38	39	42	45	48	49
1	(1) Nicki Pedersen	11	3					3					3					1					1
1	(2) Bjarne Pedersen	11		2					3					1					2					3
1	(3) Kenneth Bjerre	9			1					0					2					3					3
1	(4) Niels Kristian Iversen	7				1					0					1					2					3
1	(5) Hans N. Andersen (c)	11					2					2					3					3					1
2	Poland	46	1	4	7	7	10	12	12	15	17	20	21	23	24	27	29	31	34	34	37	37	37	38	39	43	46
2	(1) Rune Holta	5	1								2				1							E4		1
2	(2) Wiesław Jaguś	12		3								3				3		2							1
2	(3) Tomasz Gollob (c)	14			3			2									2		3							4J
2	(4) Grzegorz Walasek	4				0			0				1							0							3
2	(5) Jarosław Hampel	11					3			3				2							3		F2x
Placing	Team / Rider name	Total	1	2	3	4	5	6	7	8	9	10	11	12	13	14	15	16	17	18	19	20	21	22	23	24	25
3	Sweden	39	0	0	0	3	3	3	4	5	11	11	13	16	19	21	21	24	25	27	27	29	32	34	36	37	39
3	(1) Andreas Jonsson (c)	9	0							1						2			1				3				2
3	(2) Daniel Nermark	0		0							-						0			-			-
3	(3) Peter Ljung	4			X							0	2								F4			2
3	(4) Fredrik Lindgren	16				3		X			6J			3								2			2
3	(5) Jonas Davidsson	10					0		1						3			3		2						1
4	Australia	21	2	3	5	7	8	9	11	13	14	15	15	15	15	15	16	16	16	17	18	19	21	21	21	21	21
4	(1) Leigh Adams (c)	6	2						2								1				1				0		0J
4	(2) Chris Holder	4		1						2			0	F2x								1				E1
4	(3) Jason Crump	3			2						1			-				-									-
4	(4) Ryan Sullivan	5				2						1			E4				0				2
4	(5) Davey Watt	3					1	1								0		0		1				0
Placing	Team / Rider name	Total	1	2	3	4	5	6	7	8	9	10	11	12	13	14	15	16	17	18	19	20	21	22	23	24	25

M - exclusion for exceeding two minute time allowance • T - exclusion for touching the tapes • X - other exclusion • E - retired or mechanical failure • F - fell

Helmet colours were permanent for each team (red, blue, white and yellow/black). Colours in tables show gate positions:
gate A – inside	gate B	gate C	gate D – outside

=== Heat after heat ===
Extended content
1. N.Pedersen, Adams, Holta, Jonsson
2. Jaguś, B.Pedersen, Holder, Nermark
3. Gollob, Crump, Bjerre, Ljung (X)
4. Lindgren, Sullivan, Iversen, Walasek
5. Hampel, Andersen, Watt, Davidsson
6. N.Pedersen, Gollob, Watt, Lindgren (Fx)
7. B.Pedersen, Adams, Davidsson, Walasek
8. Hampel, Holder, Jonsson, Bjerre
9. Lindgren (6 - joker), Holta, Crump, Iversen
10. Jaguś, Andersen, Sullivan, Ljung
11. N.Pedersen, Ljung, Walasek, Holder
12. Lindgren, Hampel, B.Pedersen, Holder (Fx)
13. Davidsson, Bjerre, Holta, Sullivan (e4)
14. Jaguś, Jonsson, Iversen, Watt
15. Andersen, Gollob, Adams, Nermark
16. Davidsson, Jaguś, N.Pedersen, Watt
17. Gollob, B.Pedersen, Jonsson, Sullivan (e4)
18. Bjerre, Davidsson, Watt, Walasek
19. Hampel, Iversen, Adams, Ljung (F4)
20. Andersen, Lindgren, Holder, Holta (e4)
21. Jonsson, Sullivan, N.Pedersen, Hampel (Fx)
22. B.Pedersen, Ljung, Holta, Watt
23. Bjerre, Lindgren, Jaguś, Adams
24. Iversen, Gollob (4 - joker), Davidsson, Holder (e1)
25. Walasek, Jonsson, Andersen, Adams (0 - joker)

== Final classification ==
Pos.	National team	Pts.
Gold	Denmark	49
Silver	Poland	46
Bronze	Sweden	39
4	Australia	21
5	Great Britain	36
6	Russia	17
7	Czech Republic	13
8	Hungary	10
