= 2017 Speedway World Cup Event 1 =

2017 FIM Speedway World Cup – Event 1
Information
- Date: 1 July 2017
- City: King's Lynn
- Event: 1 of 4

Stadium details
- Stadium: Adrian Flux Arena
- Capacity: 8,500
- Length: 342 m
- Track: speedway track

SWC Results
Winner		Great Britain - 53 pts
Runner-up		Australia - 44 pts
3rd place		United States - 15 pts
4th place		Czech Republic - 13 pts

Event One of the 2017 Monster Energy FIM Speedway World Cup was the opening race of the 2017 edition of the Speedway World Cup. It was staged on July 1 at the Adrian Flux Arena in King's Lynn, Great Britain and was won by Great Britain from Australia, United States, and the Czech Republic. As a result, Great Britain progressed directly to the 2017 Speedway World Cup Final, while Australia and the United States progressed to the 2017 Speedway World Cup Race-off. The Czech Republic were eliminated.

Craig Cook led Great Britain to the final by scoring 14 points, while Steve Worrall, Chris Harris and Robert Lambert all scored 13 points each. Australia were hampered by the loss of Jason Doyle, who was injured and unable to compete, however Chris Holder was the star of the meeting scoring 19 points.

== Results ==
Pos.	National team	Pts.
1	Great Britain	53
2	Australia	44
3	United States	15
4	Czech Republic	13

== Scores ==
(United Kingdom)	GREAT BRITAIN	53
No	Rider Name	Pts.	Heats
1	Steve Worrall	13	3,2,2,3,3
2	Craig Cook	14	3,3,3,3,2
3	Chris Harris	13	3,2,3,3,2
4	Robert Lambert	13	3,3,2,3,2
5	Adam Ellis	0

(Australia)	AUSTRALIA	44
No	Rider Name	Pts.	Heats
1	Max Fricke	8	2,1,2,1,2
2	Chris Holder	19	2,3,3,6,2,3
3	Nick Morris	5	0,2,2,1
4	Troy Batchelor	12	2,3,2,2,3

5	Jason Doyle	0
(United States)	UNITED STATES	15
No	Rider Name	Pts.	Heats
1	Ricky Wells	3	0,0,1,2,0
2	Gino Manzares	7	2,2,2,0,1
3	Luke Becker	2	1,0,1,0
4	Dillon Ruml	2	1,1,0,0
5	Broc Nicol	1	1,0

(Czech Republic)	CZECH REPUBLIC	13
No	Rider Name	Pts.	Heats
1	Matěj Kůs	0	0,0,0,0
2	Václav Milík, Jr.	6	0,1,0,2,3
3	Josef Franc	4	1,1,0,1,1
4	Hynek Štichauer	3	1,0,1,1
5	Eduard Krčmář	0	0,0

== See also ==
- 2017 Speedway Grand Prix
