= 2008 Speedway World Cup Event 2 =

2008 FIM NordicBet Speedway World Cup - Event 2
Information
- Date: 14 July 2008
- City: Coventry
- Event: 2 of 4 (33)
- Referee: Christian Froschauer
- Jury President: Armando Castagna

Stadium details
- Stadium: Brandon stadium

SWC Results
- Attendance: 4,000
- Best Time: (Denmark) Nicki Pedersen; 58.6 secs (in Heat 1)
Winner		Denmark - 63 pts
Runner-up		Sweden - 50.5 pts
3rd place		Great Britain - 25.5 pts
4th place		Czech Republic - 13 pts

The 2008 Speedway World Cup Event 2 was the second race of the 2008 Speedway World Cup season. It took place on 14 July 2008 in the Brandon stadium in Coventry, Great Britain.

== Results ==
Pos.	National team	Pts.
1	Denmark	63
2	Sweden	50.5
3	Great Britain	25.5
4	Czech Republic	13

== Heat details ==
Placing	Team / Rider name	Total	1	2	3	4	5	6	7	8	9	10	11	12	13	14	15	16	17	18	19	20	21	22	23	24	25
1	Denmark	63	3	6	9	11	14	17	17	20	23	25	27	29	31	33	36	39	41	44	47	50	52	55	57	60	63
1	(1) Nicki Pedersen	14	3								3				2							3		3
1	(2) Niels K. Iversen	12		3								2				2		3							2
1	(3) Kenneth Bjerre	14			3			3									3		2							3
1	(4) Hans Andersen (c)	10				2			0				2							3							3
1	(5) Bjarne Pedersen	13					3			3				2							3		2
2	Sweden	50.5	2	3	4	7	8	10	13	15	17	23	24	27	30	33	35	36	37	38	39.5	40.5	43.5	43.5	46.5	48.5	50.5
2	(1) Fredrik Lindgren	11.5	2						3								2				1.5				3
2	(2) Peter Ljung	7		1						2			1									1				2
2	(3) Andreas Jonsson (c)	9			1						2			3				1									2
2	(4) Jonas Davidsson	16				3						6J			3				1				3
2	(5) Daniel Nermark	7					1	2								3				1				Fx
Placing	Team / Rider name	Total	1	2	3	4	5	6	7	8	9	10	11	12	13	14	15	16	17	18	19	20	21	22	23	24	25
3	(United Kingdom) Great Britain	25.5	1	3	5	5	7	7	8	9	10	10	10	11	11	12	13	15	18	20	21.5	23.5	24.5	24.5	25.5	25.5	25.5
3	(1) Scott Nicholls (c)	4	1					0J					Fx					2					1
3	(2) Chris Harris	8.5		2					1					1					3		1.5			X
3	(3) Lee Richardson	6			2					1					0					2					1
3	(4) Simon Stead	2				0					1					1					-					0
3	(5) Oliver Allen	5					2					0					1					2					0
4	Czech Republic	13	0	0	0	1	1	2	4	4	4	5	8	8	9	9	9	9	9	9	9	9	9	11	11	12	13
4	(1) Matěj Kůs	1	0							0						-			-								1
4	(2) Aleš Dryml, Jr. (c)	0		0							0						0			0			-
4	(3) Adrian Rymel	6			0							1	3			FxJ					0			2
4	(4) Filip Šitera	2				1		1						0					0			0			0
4	(5) Luboš Tomíček, Jr.	4					0		2						1			0					0			1
Placing	Team / Rider name	Total	1	2	3	4	5	6	7	8	9	10	11	12	13	14	15	16	17	18	19	20	21	22	23	24	25

M - exclusion for exceeding two minute time allowance • T - exclusion for touching the tapes • X - other exclusion • E - retired or mechanical failure • F - fell

Helmet colours were permanent for each team (red, blue, white and yellow/black). Colours in tables show gate positions:
gate A – inside	gate B	gate C	gate D – outside

=== Heat after heat ===
1. (58.6) N.Pedersen, Lindgren, Nicholls, Kus
2. (59.1) Iversen, Harris, Ljung, Dryml
3. (59.4) Bjerre, Richardson, Jonsson, Rymel
4. (58.9) Davidsson, Andersen, Sitera, Stead
5. (59.9) B.Pedersen, Allen, Nermark, Tomicek
6. (59.6) Bjerre, Nermark, Sitera, Nicholls - joker
7. (59.9) Lindgren, Tomicek, Harris, Andersen
8. (60.0) B.Pedersen, Ljung, Richardson, Kus
9. (59.2) N.Pedersen, Jonsson, Stead, Dryml
10. (60.2) Davidsson - joker, Iversen, Rymel, Allen
11. (60.7) Rymel, Andersen, Ljung, Nicholls (X)
12. (59.8) Jonsson, B.Pedersen, Harris, Sitera
13. (59.8) Davidsson, N.Pedersen, Tomicek, Richardson
14. (60.6) Nermark, Iversen, Stead, Rymel - joker (X)
15. (60.8) Bjerre, Lindgren, Allen, Dryml
16. (60.1) Iversen, Nicholls, Jonsson, Tomicek
17. (60.3) Harris, Bjerre, Davidsson, Sitera
18. (60.5) Andersen, Richardson, Nermark, Dryml
19. (60.4) B.Pedersen, Lindgren and Harris (both 1.5 points), Rymel
  HARRIS and LINDGREN receive 1.5 points each
20. (60.1) N.Pedersen, Allen, Ljung, Sitera
21. (61.0) Davidsson, B.Pedersen, Nicholls, Tomicek
22. (61.0) N.Pedersen, Rymel, Harris (x/dublel), Nermark (Fx)
23. (61.0) Lindgren, Iversen, Richardson, Sitera
24. (61.2) Bjerre, Ljung, Tomicek, Stead
25. (61.1) Andersen, Jonsson, Kus, Allen

== See also ==
- 2008 Speedway World Cup
- motorcycle speedway
