= List of Speedway Grands Prix =

The following is a complete list of Grands Prix which have been a part of the FIM Speedway Grand Prix since its inception in 1995.

== Current ==
- Speedway Grand Prix of Czech Republic (1997–)
- Speedway Grand Prix of Denmark (1995–)
- Speedway Grand Prix of Germany (1995–1998, 2001, 2007–2008, 2016–)
- Speedway Grand Prix of Great Britain (1995–)
- Speedway Grand Prix of Latvia (2006–2009, 2013–2015, 2017, 2023–)
- Speedway Grand Prix of Poland (1995–)
- Speedway Grand Prix of Sweden (1995–)

== Former ==
- Speedway Grand Prix of Australia (2002, 2015–2017)
- Speedway Grand Prix of Austria (1995)
- Speedway Grand Prix of Croatia (2010–2012, 2022–2024)
- Speedway Grand Prix of Europe (2000, 2002–2014)
- Speedway Grand Prix of Finland (2014–2015)
- Speedway Grand Prix of Italy (1996, 2005–2013)
- Speedway Grand Prix of New Zealand (2012–2014)
- Speedway Grand Prix of Nordic (2009–2014)
- Speedway Grand Prix of Norway (2002–2004)
- Speedway Grand Prix of Russia (2021)
- Speedway Grand Prix of Scandinavia (2002–2019)
- Speedway Grand Prix of Slovenia (2002–2009, 2013, 2015–2019)
