= 2004 Speedway World Cup Event 2 =

Information
- Date: 3 August 2004
- City: Eastbourne
- Event: 2 of 4 (17)

Stadium details
- Stadium: Arlington Stadium

SWC Results
Winner		Denmark - 60 pts
Runner-up		Australia - 52 pts
3rd place		Czech Republic - 32 pts
4th place		Italy - 14 pts

The 2004 Speedway World Cup Event 2 was the second race of the 2004 Speedway World Cup season. It took place on August 3, 2004 in the Arlington Stadium in Eastbourne, Great Britain.

== Results ==
Pos.	National team	Pts.
1	Denmark	60
2	Australia	52
3	Czech Republic	32
4	Italy	14

== Heat details ==
Placing	Team / Rider name	Total	1	2	3	4	5	6	7	8	9	10	11	12	13	14	15	16	17	18	19	20	21	22	23	24	25
1	Denmark	60	3	6	8	10	12	15	17	20	23	23	26	29	32	35	38	41	43	45	48	50	53	54	55	58	60
1	(1) Hans N. Andersen	13	3							3						3			2								2
1	(2) Nicki Pedersen	14		3							3						3			2			3
1	(3) Kenneth Bjerre	9			2							X	3								3			1
1	(4) Niels Kristian Iversen	11				2		3						3								2			1
1	(5) Bjarne Pedersen	13					2		2						3			3								3
2	Australia	52	1	3	6	9	12	14	17	18	19	22	24	26	28	30	32	34	40	43	43	46	48	51	51	51	52
2	(1) Ryan Sullivan	10	1								1				2							3		3
2	(2) Steve Johnston	9		2								3				2		2							X
2	(3) Leigh Adams	13			3			2									2		6J							X
2	(4) Jason Crump	12				3			3				2							3							1
2	(5) Adam Shields	8					3			1				2							F		2
Placing	Team / Rider name	Total	1	2	3	4	5	6	7	8	9	10	11	12	13	14	15	16	17	18	19	20	21	22	23	24	25
3	Czech Republic	32	2	3	4	5	5	6	7	9	11	13	14	14	15	16	17	17	18	19	21	21	22	22	28	29	32
3	(1) Aleš Dryml, Jr.	12	2						1								1				2				6J
3	(2) Bohumil Brhel	5		1						2			1									0				1
3	(3) Lukáš Dryml	6			1						2			E				F									3
3	(4) Tomáš Topinka	7				1		1				2			1				1				1
3	(5) Josef Franc	2					0	-								1				1				0
4	Italy	14	0	0	0	0	1	1	1	1	1	2	2	3	3	3	3	4	4	4	5	6	6	8	10	14	14
4	(1) Andrea Maida	1	0					0					0					1					0
4	(2) Paolo Salvatelli	3		F					0					1					0					2
4	(3) Emiliano Sanchez	6			0					0					0					0					2	4J
4	(4) Daniele Tessari	0				0					0					0					-					-
4	(5) Simone Terenzani	4					1					1					0				1	1					0
Placing	Team / Rider name	Total	1	2	3	4	5	6	7	8	9	10	11	12	13	14	15	16	17	18	19	20	21	22	23	24	25

M - exclusion for exceeding two minute time allowance • T - exclusion for touching the tapes • X - other exclusion • E - retired or mechanical failure • F - fell

Helmet colours were permanent for each team (red, blue, white and yellow/black). Colours in tables show gate positions:
gate A – inside	gate B	gate C	gate D – outside

== See also ==
- 2004 Speedway World Cup
- Motorcycle speedway
