= 2004 Speedway World Cup =

45th edition of the annual motorcycle speedway World Cup competition

Speedway World Cup
- Venues: Arlington Stadium, Poole Stadium
- Location: England
- Start date: 2 August
- End date: 7 August
- Nations: 8

Champions
- Sweden

The 2004 Speedway World Cup was the 4th FIM Speedway World Cup season. The final took place on 7 August 2004 in Poole, England. The tournament was won by Sweden (49 pts) and they beat host team, Great Britain (48 pts), Denmark (32 pts) and Poland (22 pts) in the Final.

== Qualification ==
- Qualifying round 1
- (Italy) Santa Marina Stadium, Lonigo

Pos.	National team	Pts.
1	Italy	54
2	Germany	47
3	Finland	31
4	Latvia	18

- Qualifying round 2
- (Hungary) Christián László Municipal Sports Complex, Gyula

Pos.	National team	Pts.
1	Hungary	51
2	Slovenia	47
3	Russia	42
4	Austria	10

== Venues ==
Two cities were selected to host SWC finals events:

City	Stadium names
Eastbourne	Arlington Stadium
Poole	Wimborne Road

== Tournament ==
Semifinals
2 August - Eastbourne (details)
Great Britain	58
Sweden	50
Poland	39
Hungary	6
3 August - Eastbourne (details)
Denmark	60
Australia	52
Czech Republic	32
Italy	14

Race-off
5 August - Poole (details)
Sweden	49
Poland	43
Australia	42
Czech Republic	17

Final
7 August - Poole
Sweden	49
Great Britain	48
Denmark	32
Poland	22

== Final ==
The 2004 Speedway World Cup Final took place on 7 August at Wimborne Road in Poole.

=== Results ===
Pos.	National team	Pts.
1	Sweden	49
2	Great Britain	48
3	Denmark	32
4	Poland	22

=== Heat details ===
Placing	Team / Rider name	Total	1	2	3	4	5	6	7	8	9	10	11	12	13	14	15	16	17	18	19	20	21	22	23	24	25
1	Sweden	49	2	5	6	7	7	8	11	14	15	18	21	24	24	26	29	30	30	33	33	36	38	41	43	46	49
1	(1) Mikael Max	9	2					1					3					1					2
1	(2) Tony Rickardsson	12		3					3					3					0					3
1	(3) Antonio Lindbäck	9			1					3					0					3					2
1	(4) Andreas Jonsson	7				1					1					2					0					3
1	(5) Peter Karlsson	12					X					3					3					3					3
2	Great Britain	48	1	2	5	8	11	13	14	15	18	18	20	22	25	28	30	33	36	36	38	39	40	41	44	46	48
2	(1) David Norris	9	1								3				3							1		1
2	(2) Lee Richardson	10		1								0				3		3							3
2	(3) Mark Loram	12			3			2									2		3							2
2	(4) Scott Nicholls	8				3			1				2							E							2
2	(5) Gary Havelock	9					3			1				2							2		1
Placing	Team / Rider name	Total	1	2	3	4	5	6	7	8	9	10	11	12	13	14	15	16	17	18	19	20	21	22	23	24	25
3	Denmark	32	3	3	5	5	6	9	11	13	15	16	17	18	20	21	22	24	26	27	30	30	30	30	31	32	32
3	(1) Hans N. Andersen	11	3							2						1			2		3						0
3	(2) Nicki Pedersen	4		0							2						1			1			X
3	(3) Kenneth Bjerre	4			2							1	1								-			0
3	(4) Niels Kristian Iversen	5				0		3						1								0			1
3	(5) Bjarne Pedersen	8					1		2						2			2								1
4	Poland	22	0	2	2	4	6	6	6	6	6	8	8	8	10	10	10	10	11	13	14	16	19	21	21	21	22
4	(1) Krzysztof Kasprzak	0	0						0								0				-				-
4	(2) Jarosław Hampel	4		2						0			0									2				0
4	(3) Tomasz Gollob	1			0						F			0				0									1
4	(4) Janusz Kołodziej	10				2						2			2				1				3		XJ
4	(5) Marcin Rempała	7					2	0								0				2	1			2
Placing	Team / Rider name	Total	1	2	3	4	5	6	7	8	9	10	11	12	13	14	15	16	17	18	19	20	21	22	23	24	25

M - exclusion for exceeding two minute time allowance • T - exclusion for touching the tapes • X - other exclusion • E - retired or mechanical failure • F - fell

Helmet colours were permanent for each team (red, blue, white and yellow/black). Colours in tables show gate positions:
gate A – inside	gate B	gate C	gate D – outside

== Final classification ==
Pos.	National team	Pts.
Gold	Sweden	49
Silver	Great Britain	48
Bronze	Denmark	32
4	Poland	22
5	Australia	42
6	Czech Republic	17
7	Italy	14
8	Hungary	6
