= 2004 Speedway World Cup Event 1 =

Information
- Date: 2 August 2004
- City: Eastbourne
- Event: 1 of 4 (16)

Stadium details
- Stadium: Arlington Stadium

SWC Results
Winner		Great Britain - 58 pts
Runner-up		Sweden - 50 pts
3rd place		Poland - 39 pts
4th place		Hungary - 6 pts

The 2004 Speedway World Cup Event 1 was the first race of the 2004 Speedway World Cup season. It took place on August 2, 2004 in the Arlington Stadium in Eastbourne, Great Britain.

== Results ==
Pos.	National team	Pts.
1	Great Britain	58
2	Sweden	50
3	Poland	39
4	Hungary	6

== Heat details ==
Placing	Team / Rider name	Total	1	2	3	4	5	6	7	8	9	10	11	12	13	14	15	16	17	18	19	20	21	22	23	24	25
1	Great Britain	58	3	5	7	9	11	14	14	16	18	21	24	27	29	32	34	37	40	41	44	45	48	51	53	56	58
1	(1) Mark Loram	15	3					3					3					3					3
1	(2) David Norris	11		2					X					3					3					3
1	(3) Joe Screen	9			2					2					2					1					2
1	(4) Scott Nicholls	13				2					2					3					3					3
1	(5) Lee Richardson	10					2					3					2					1					2
2	Sweden	50	2	5	6	9	9	11	14	17	17	18	20	22	22	26	29	29	31	34	36	39	41	42	45	47	50
2	(1) Andreas Jonsson	14	2							3						4J			2								3
2	(2) Tony Rickardsson	11		3							M						3			3			2
2	(3) Mikael Max	7			1							1	2								2			1
2	(4) Peter Karlsson	13				3		2						2								3			3
2	(5) Antonio Lindbäck	5					T		3						X			E								2
Placing	Team / Rider name	Total	1	2	3	4	5	6	7	8	9	10	11	12	13	14	15	16	17	18	19	20	21	22	23	24	25
3	Poland	39	1	2	5	6	9	10	12	13	16	18	19	19	25	26	27	29	29	31	32	34	34	36	37	38	39
3	(1) Tomasz Gollob	14	1								3				6J							2		2
3	(2) Jarosław Hampel	9		1								2				1		2		2					1
3	(3) Grzegorz Walasek	6			3			1									1		T							1
3	(4) Janusz Kołodziej	5				1			2				1							-							1
3	(5) Krzysztof Kasprzak	5					3			1				X							1		M
4	Hungary	6	0	0	0	0	1	1	2	2	3	3	3	4	4	4	4	5	6	6	6	6	6	6	6	6	6
4	(1) Norbert Magosi	1	0						1								M				0J				0
4	(2) Sándor Tihanyi	0		0						0			0									0				0
4	(3) Attila Stefani	2			0						1			1				-									0
4	(4) Laszlo Szatmari	2				0						0			X			1	1				X
4	(5) Szabolcs Vida	1					1	0								0				0				0
Placing	Team / Rider name	Total	1	2	3	4	5	6	7	8	9	10	11	12	13	14	15	16	17	18	19	20	21	22	23	24	25

M - exclusion for exceeding two minute time allowance • T - exclusion for touching the tapes • X - other exclusion • E - retired or mechanical failure • F - fell

Helmet colours were permanent for each team (red, blue, white and yellow/black). Colours in tables show gate positions:
gate A – inside	gate B	gate C	gate D – outside

== See also ==
- 2004 Speedway World Cup
- motorcycle speedway
