= 2016 Speedway World Cup Event 1 =

2016 FIM Speedway World Cup – Event 1
Information
- Date: 23 July 2016
- City: Vojens
- Event: 1 of 4
- Referee: Susanne Huttinger

Stadium details
- Stadium: Vojens Speedway Center
- Capacity: 22,000
- Length: 300 m
- Track: speedway track

SWC Results
Winner		Poland - 39 pts
Runner-up		Denmark - 36 pts
3rd place		Russia - 32 pts
4th place		Czech Republic - 19 pts

Event One of the 2016 Monster Energy FIM Speedway World Cup was the opening race of the 2016 edition of the Speedway World Cup. It was staged on 23 July 2016 at Vojens Speedway Center in Vojens, Denmark and was won by Poland from hosts Denmark, Russia, and the Czech Republic. As a result, Poland progressed directly to the 2016 Speedway World Cup Final, while Denmark and Russia progressed to the 2016 Speedway World Cup Race-off. The Czech Republic were eliminated.

Piotr Pawlicki Jr. led Poland to the final by scoring 12 points, while Patryk Dudek, who scored 11 points, secured second place in the heat 20 to ensure Poland finished ahead of Denmark. Michael Jepsen Jensen top scored for the Danes with 18 points, while Emil Sayfutdinov was the star of the meeting, scoring 18 points for Russia.

== Results ==
Pos.	National team	Pts.
1	Poland	39
2	Denmark	36
3	Russia	32
4	Czech Republic	19

== Scores ==
(Poland)	POLAND	39
No	Rider Name	Pts.	Heats
1	Patryk Dudek	11	3,3,1,2,2
2	Maciej Janowski	7	2,1,2,X,2
3	Piotr Pawlicki Jr.	12	3,1,2,3,3
4	Bartosz Zmarzlik	9	1,2,3,3,X
5	Krystian Pieszczek	0

(Denmark)	DENMARK	36
No	Rider Name	Pts.	Heats
1	Michael Jepsen Jensen	12	2,2,3,X,4,1
2	Niels Kristian Iversen	8	2,1,X,2,3
3	Kenneth Bjerre	6	2,2,E,2
4	Leon Madsen	10	1,3,3,E,3
5	Frederik Jakobsen	0

(Russia)	RUSSIA	32
No	Rider Name	Pts.	Heats
1	Andrey Kudryashov	5	1,3,0,0,1,0
2	Emil Sayfutdinov	18	3,0,3,3,6,3
3	Artem Laguta	8	0,2,2,2,2
4	Viktor Kulakov	1	0,1,0
5	Grigorii Laguta	0

(Czech Republic)	CZECH REPUBLIC	19
No	Rider Name	Pts.	Heats
1	Václav Milík	12	3,3,2,2,1,1
2	Matěj Kůs	3	1,0,1,1,0
3	Josef Franc	2	0,0,1,1
4	Eduard Krčmář	2	0,0,1,1,0
5	Zdenek Holub	0

== See also ==
- 2016 Speedway Grand Prix
