= 2007 Speedway World Cup Event 1 =

Information
- Date: 14 July 2007
- City: Vojens
- Event: 1 of 4 (28)
- Referee: Jim Lawrence

Stadium details
- Stadium: Speedway Center

SWC Results
- Attendance: 10,482
- Best Time: (Denmark) Kenneth Bjerre and (Australia) Leigh Adams; 60.0 secs (in Heat 11 and 13)
Winner		Denmark - 60 pts
Runner-up		Poland - 44 pts
3rd place		Australia - 39 pts
4th place		Finland - 11 pts

The 2007 Speedway World Cup Event 1 was the first race of the 2007 Speedway World Cup season. It took place on July 14, 2007 in the Speedway Center in Vojens, Denmark.

== Results ==
Pos.	National team	Pts.
1	Denmark	60
2	Poland	44
3	Australia	39
4	Finland	11

== Heat details ==
Placing	Team / Rider Name	Total	1	2	3	4	5	6	7	8	9	10	11	12	13	14	15	16	17	18	19	20	21	22	23	24	25
1	Denmark	60	2	5	8	10	11	12	15	18	21	23	26	29	31	32	35	38	41	42	45	48	51	54	56	58	60
1	(1) Nicki Pedersen	13	2								3				2							3		3
1	(2) Niels Kristian Iversen	11		3								2				1		3							2
1	(3) Hans N. Andersen	12			3			1									3		3							2
1	(4) Kenneth Bjerre	11				2			3				3							1							2
1	(5) Bjarne Pedersen	13					1			3				3							3		3
1	(6) Jesper B. Jensen	-
2	Poland	44	1	1	3	6	8	10	12	13	13	16	20	21	22	24	25	27	29	32	34	36	38	38	38	41	44
2	(1) Tomasz Gollob	6	1						2								1				2				0
2	(2) Jarosław Hampel	6		0						1			-									2				3
2	(3) Rune Holta	8			2						0			1				2									3
2	(4) Grzegorz Walasek	15				3						3	4J		1				2				2
2	(5) Krzysztof Kasprzak	9					2	2								2				3				0
2	(6) Damian Baliński	-
Placing	Team / Rider Name	Total	1	2	3	4	5	6	7	8	9	10	11	12	13	14	15	16	17	18	19	20	21	22	23	24	25
3	Australia	39	3	4	5	5	8	11	12	14	15	16	16	16	19	22	26	27	28	30	31	32	33	34	37	38	39
3	(1) Jason Crump	10	3							2						3			1								1
3	(2) Chris Holder	5		1							1						-			2			1
3	(3) Rory Schlein	4			1							1	X								1			1
3	(4) Ryan Sullivan	7				0		3						0								1			3
3	(5) Leigh Adams	13					3		1						3		4J	1								1
3	(6) Davey Watt	-
4	Finland	11	0	2	2	3	3	3	3	3	5	5	6	8	8	8	8	8	8	8	8	8	8	10	11	11	11
4	(1) Juha Hautamäki	1	0					0					1					0					0
4	(2) Joonas Kylmäkorpi	6		2					0					2					0					2
4	(3) Kauko Nieminen	1			0					0					0					0					1
4	(4) Kai Laukkanen	3				1					2					0J					0					0
4	(5) Tero Aarnio	0					0					0					0					0					0
4	(6) Rene Lehtinen	-
Placing	Team / Rider Name	Total	1	2	3	4	5	6	7	8	9	10	11	12	13	14	15	16	17	18	19	20	21	22	23	24	25

M - exclusion for exceeding two minute time allowance • T - exclusion for touching the tapes • X - other exclusion • E - retired or mechanical failure • F - fell

Helmet colours was permanent for each teams (Red, Blue, White and Yellow/Black). Colours in diagrams means gate positions:
gate A – inside	gate B	gate C	gate D – outside

== See also ==
- 2007 Speedway World Cup
- motorcycle speedway
