= 2006 Speedway World Cup Event 1 =

FIM ASL FREIGHT MOVEMENTS Speedway World Cup 2006 - Event 1
Information
- Date: 16 July 2006
- City: Rybnik
- Event: 1 of 4 (24)
- Referee: Frank Ziegler
- Jury President: Ilka Teromaa

Stadium details
- Stadium: Rybnik Municipal Stadium
- Length: 357 m

SWC Results
- Attendance: 8,000
- Best Time: (Australia) Jason Crump; 66.44 secs (in Heat 18)
Winner		Australia - 49 pts
Runner-up		Great Britain - 48 pts
3rd place		Poland - 48 pts
4th place		Finland - 9 pts

The 2006 Speedway World Cup Event 1 was the first race of the 2006 Speedway World Cup season. It took place on 16 July 2006 in the Rybnik Municipal Stadium in Rybnik, Poland.

== Results ==
Pos.	National team	Pts.
1	Australia	49
2	Great Britain	48
3	Poland	48
4	Finland	9

== Heat details ==
Placing	Team / Rider Name	Total	1	2	3	4	5	6	7	8	9	10	11	12	13	14	15	16	17	18	19	20	21	22	23	24	25
1	Australia	49	3	3	4	7	9	12	15	18	19	21	24	24	26	27	30	30	33	36	39	41	41	43	43	46	49
1	(1) Ryan Sullivan	10	3								1				2							2		2
1	(2) Rory Schlein	3		0								2				1		0							0
1	(3) Leigh Adams (c)	13			1			3									3		3							3
1	(4) Jason Crump	15				3			3				3							3							3
1	(5) Todd Wiltshire	8					2			3				E2							3		Fx
2	Great Britain	48	1	4	7	8	9	11	13	15	18	21	23	25	26	29	30	33	34	35	37	40	42	43	45	46	48
2	(1) Lee Richardson	10	1					2					2					3					2
2	(2) Simon Stead	9		3					2					2					1					1
2	(3) Chris Harris	9			3					2					1					1					2
2	(4) Scott Nicholls (c)	10				1					3					3					2					1
2	(5) Mark Loram	10					1					3					1					3					2
Placing	Team / Rider Name	Total	1	2	3	4	5	6	7	8	9	10	11	12	13	14	15	16	17	18	19	20	21	22	23	24	25
3	Poland	48	2	3	5	7	10	11	12	12	14	15	16	19	22	24	26	27	29	31	32	33	36	42	45	47	48
3	(1) Piotr Protasiewicz	7	2							0						2			2								1
3	(2) Sebastian Ułamek	10		1							2						2			2			3
3	(3) Wiesław Jaguś	5			2							1	1								1			-
3	(4) Jarosław Hampel	10				2		1						3								1			3
3	(5) Tomasz Gollob (c)	16					3		1						3			1						6J		2
4	Finland	9	0	2	2	2	2	2	2	3	3	3	3	4	4	4	4	6	6	6	6	6	8	8	9	9	9
4	(1) Juha Hautamäki	1	0						0								0				0				1
4	(2) Kauko Nieminen	3		2						1			0						0			0				0
4	(3) Kai Laukkanen (c)	5			0						0			1				2					2J				0
4	(4) Tomi Reima	0				Fx						0			0				-				-
4	(5) Juha Makela	0					0	0								0				0				0
Placing	Team / Rider Name	Total	1	2	3	4	5	6	7	8	9	10	11	12	13	14	15	16	17	18	19	20	21	22	23	24	25

M - exclusion for exceeding two minute time allowance • T - exclusion for touching the tapes • X - other exclusion • E - retired or mechanical failure • F - fell

Helmet colours was permanent for each teams (Red, Blue, White and Yellow/Black). Colours in diagrams means gate positions:
gate A – inside	gate B	gate C	gate D – outside

=== Heat after heat ===
1. Sullivan, Protasiewicz, Richardson, Hautamaeki
2. Stead, Nieminen, Ułamek, Schlein
3. Harris, Jaguś, Adams, Laukkanen
4. Crump, Hampel, Nicholls, Reima(Fx)
5. Gollob, Wiltshire, Loram, Makela
6. Adams, Richardson, Hampel, Makela
7. Crump, Stead, Gollob, Hautamaeki
8. Wiltshire, Harris, Nieminen, Protasiewicz
9. Nicholls, Ułamek, Sullivan, Laukkanen
10. Loram, Schlein, Jaguś, Reima
11. Crump, Richardson, Jaguś, Nieminen
12. Hampel, Stead, Laukkanen, Wiltshire(e2)
13. Gollob, Sullivan, Harris, Reima
14. Nicholls, Protasiewicz, Schlein, Makela
15. Adams, Ułamek, Loram, Hautamaeki
16. Richardson, Laukkanen, Gollob, Schlein
17. Adams, Protasiewicz, Stead, Nieminen
18. Crump, Ułamek, Harris, Makela
19. Wiltshire, Nicholls, Jaguś, Hautamaeki
20. Loram, Sullivan, Hampel, Nieminen
21. Ułamek, Richardson, Laukkanen(joker), Wiltshire(Fx)
22. Gollob(joker), Sullivan, Stead, Makela
23. Hampel, Harris, Hautamaeki, Schlein
24. Adams, Gollob, Nicholls, Nieminen
25. Crump, Loram, Protasiewicz, Laukkanen

== See also ==
- 2006 Speedway World Cup
- motorcycle speedway
