= 2016 Speedway World Cup Race-off =

2016 FIM Speedway World Cup – Race Off
Information
- Date: 29 June 2016
- City: Manchester
- Event: 3 of 4
- Referee: Christian Froshauer

Stadium details
- Stadium: National Speedway Stadium
- Capacity: 18,000
- Length: 347 m
- Track: speedway track

SWC Results
Winner		Australia - 44 pts
Runner-up		Denmark - 41 pts
3rd place		Russia - 32 pts
4th place		United States - 9 pts

The 2016 Monster Energy FIM Speedway World Cup Race Off was the third race of the 2016 edition of the Speedway World Cup. It was run on July 29 at the National Speedway Stadium in Manchester, England and was won by Australia from Denmark, Russia and the United States. As a result, Australia progressed to the 2016 Speedway World Cup Final, where they will join defending champions and Event Two winners Sweden, hosts Great Britain and Event One winners Poland. Denmark finished second, but were eliminated from the competition along with Russia and the United States.

Jason Doyle led Australia to victory with a 15-point maximum, and he was well supported by Sam Masters and Chris Holder, while reserve Brady Kurtz scored six points after replacing the injured Max Fricke. Niels Kristian Iversen top scored with 16 points for Denmark, however his efforts were not enough as the Danes fell short of reaching the final by four points.

== Results ==
Pos.	National team	Pts.
1	Australia	44
2	Denmark	41
3	Russia	32
4	United States	9

== Scores ==
(Australia)	AUSTRALIA	44
No	Rider Name	Pts.	Heats
1	Sam Masters	12	3,3,2,1,3
2	Max Fricke	2	2
3	Jason Doyle	15	3,3,3,3,3
4	Chris Holder	9	2,3,2,1,1
5	Brady Kurtz	6	2,1,1,2

(Denmark)	DENMARK	41
No	Rider Name	Pts.	Heats
1	Niels Kristian Iversen	16	3,3,4,2,3,1
2	Leon Madsen	7	1,1,1,2,2
3	Michael Jepsen Jensen	11	3,1,3,2,2
4	Kenneth Bjerre	7	1,0,3,3
5	Mikkel Andersen	0

(Russia)	RUSSIA	32
No	Rider Name	Pts.	Heats
1	Grigory Laguta	7	X,2,3,E,2,0
2	Emil Sayfutdinov	16	2,2,6,1,3,2
3	Andrey Kudryashov	4	2,1,0,1
4	Artem Laguta	5	1,0,1,3
5	Viktor Kulakov	0

(United States)	UNITED STATES	9
No	Rider Name	Pts.	Heats
1	Luke Becker	0	0,0,0,0,0
2	Billy Janniro	3	0,1,1,0,1
3	Broc Nicol	0	0,0,0,0,0
4	Ryan Fisher	6	X,2,0,4,0
5

== See also ==
- 2016 Speedway Grand Prix
