= 2006 Speedway World Cup Event 2 =

FIM ASL FREIGHT MOVEMENTS Speedway World Cup 2006 Event 2
Information
- Date: 18 July 2006
- City: Målilla
- Event: 2 of 4 (25)

Stadium details
- Stadium: G&B Stadium

SWC Results
Winner		Sweden - 56 pts
Runner-up		Denmark - 53 pts
3rd place		United States - 39 pts
4th place		Czech Republic - 7 pts

The 2006 Speedway World Cup Event 2 was the second race of the 2006 Speedway World Cup season. It took place on July 18, 2006 in the G&B Stadium in Målilla, Sweden.

== Results ==
Pos.	National team	Pts.
1	Sweden	56
2	Denmark	53
3	United States	39
4	Czech Republic	7

== Heat details ==
Placing	Team / Rider name	Total	1	2	3	4	5	6	7	8	9	10	11	12	13	14	15	16	17	18	19	20	21	22	23	24	25
1	Sweden	56	2	5	8	11	12	14	17	19	22	25	26	29	31	32	35	38	40	42	45	46	47	48	51	54	56
1	(1) Antonio Lindbäck	14	2						3								3				3				3
1	(2) Fredrik Lindgren	10		3						2			1									1				3
1	(3) Andreas Jonsson (c)	14			3						3			3				3									2
1	(4) Mikael Max	11				3						3			2				2				1
1	(5) Peter Karlsson	7					1	2								1				2				1
2	Denmark	53	1	2	4	6	8	9	11	14	16	16	18	20	26	28	29	30	33	36	38	41	43	46	48	50	53
2	(1) Nicki Pedersen	15	1								2				6J							3		3
2	(2) Charlie Gjedde	6		1								0				2		1							2
2	(3) Niels Kristian Iversen	6			2			1									1		-							2
2	(4) Hans Andersen (c)	12				2			2				2							3							3
2	(5) Bjarne Pedersen	14					2			3				2					3		2		2
Placing	Team / Rider name	Total	1	2	3	4	5	6	7	8	9	10	11	12	13	14	15	16	17	18	19	20	21	22	23	24	25
3	United States	39	3	5	5	5	8	11	12	13	13	15	18	19	20	26	28	30	31	32	32	34	37	37	38	38	39
3	(1) Greg Hancock (c)	20	3					3					3			6J		2					3
3	(2) Billy Janniro	5		2					1					1					1					0
3	(3) Sam Ermolenko	4			X					1					1					1					1
3	(4) Brent Werner	0				0					0					-					0					0
3	(5) Billy Hamill	10					3					2					2					2					1
4	Czech Republic	7	0	0	0	1	1	1	1	1	2	3	3	3	3	3	3	3	3	3	4	4	4	6	6	7	7
4	(1) Tomas Suchanek	0	0							0						0			0								0
4	(2) Bohumil Brhel (c)	1		T							1						0			0			0
4	(3) Adrian Rymel	4			X							1	0								1			2
4	(4) Zdeněk Simota	1				1		0						0								0			0
4	(5) Josef Franc	1					0		0						0			0								1
Placing	Team / Rider name	Total	1	2	3	4	5	6	7	8	9	10	11	12	13	14	15	16	17	18	19	20	21	22	23	24	25

M - exclusion for exceeding two minute time allowance • T - exclusion for touching the tapes • X - other exclusion • E - retired or mechanical failure • F - fell

Helmet colours were permanent for each team (red, blue, white and yellow/black). Colours in tables show gate positions:
gate A – inside	gate B	gate C	gate D – outside

== See also ==
- 2006 Speedway World Cup
- Motorcycle speedway
