= 2003 Speedway World Cup Event 3 =

Information
- Date: 5 August 2003
- City: Holsted
- Event: 3 of 5 (13)

SWC Results
Winner		Poland - 58 pts
Runner-up		Sweden - 56 pts
3rd place		Russia - 28 pts
4th place		Hungary - 9 pts

The 2003 Speedway World Cup Event 3 was the third race of the 2003 Speedway World Cup season. It took place on August 5, 2003 in Holsted, Denmark.

== Results ==
Pos.	National team	Pts.
1	Poland	58
2	Sweden	56
3	Russia	28
4	Hungary	9

== Heat details ==
Placing	Team / Rider name	Total	1	2	3	4	5	6	7	8	9	10	11	12	13	14	15	16	17	18	19	20	21	22	23	24	25
1	Poland	58	2	5	7	9	12	13	15	18	20	22	25	28	31	34	36	38	41	43	46	49	50	53	55	58	58
1	(1) Tomasz Gollob	13	2								2				3							3		3
1	(2) Tomasz Bajerski	12		3								2				3		2							2
1	(3) Sebastian Ułamek	11			2			1									2		3							3
1	(4) Piotr Protasiewicz	9				2			2				3							2							X
1	(5) Jarosław Hampel	13					3			3				3							3		1
2	Sweden	56	3	4	7	10	12	15	18	20	23	26	28	30	32	33	36	39	41	41	43	45	48	48	51	53	56
2	(1) Tony Rickardsson	14	3						3								3				2				3
2	(2) Mikael Max	9		1						2			2									2				2
2	(3) Andreas Jonsson	14			3						3			2				3									3
2	(4) Peter Karlsson	13				3						3			2				2				3
2	(5) David Ruud	6					2	3								1				E				0
Placing	Team / Rider name	Total	1	2	3	4	5	6	7	8	9	10	11	12	13	14	15	16	17	18	19	20	21	22	23	24	25
3	Russia	28	1	1	2	3	4	6	6	6	7	8	9	10	11	13	14	15	15	21	22	23	25	27	28	28	28
3	(1) Sergey Darkin	9	1							0						2			0	6J							-
3	(2) Renat Gafurov	4		0							1						1			-			2				X
3	(3) Simon Vlasov	6			1							1	1								1			2
3	(4) Roman Povazhny	7				1		2						1				1				1			1
3	(5) Denis Gizatullin	2					1		0						1			-								0
4	Hungary	9	0	2	2	2	2	2	3	4	4	4	4	4	4	4	4	4	5	6	6	6	6	7	7	9	9
4	(1) Zoltán Adorján	0	0					0					0					0					0
4	(2) Norbert Magosi	7		2					1					0					1					1		2J
4	(3) Sándor Tihanyi	2			0					1					0					1	0				0
4	(4) Szabolcs Vida	0				0					0					0					-					-
4	(5) Csaba Hell	0					0					0					0					0					X
Placing	Team / Rider name	Total	1	2	3	4	5	6	7	8	9	10	11	12	13	14	15	16	17	18	19	20	21	22	23	24	25

M - exclusion for exceeding two minute time allowance • T - exclusion for touching the tapes • X - other exclusion • E - retired or mechanical failure • F - fell

Helmet colours were permanent for each team (red, blue, white and yellow/black). Colours in tables show gate positions:
gate A – inside	gate B	gate C	gate D – outside

== See also ==
- 2003 Speedway World Cup
- motorcycle speedway
