= 2008 Speedway World Cup Race-off =

Information
- Date: 17 July 2008
- City: Vojens
- Event: 3 of 4 (34)
- Referee: Frank Ziegler
- Jury President: Christer Bergström

Stadium details
- Stadium: Speedway Center

SWC Results
- Attendance: 2,000
- Best Time: (United Kingdom) Chris Harris; 58.8 secs (in Heat 8)
Winner		Sweden - 53 pts
Runner-up		Poland - 50 pts
3rd place		Great Britain - 36 pts
4th place		Russia - 17 pts

The 2008 Speedway World Cup Race-off was the third race of the 2008 Speedway World Cup season. It took place on July 17, 2008 in the Speedway Center in Vojens, Denmark.

== Results ==
Pos.	National team	Pts.
1	Sweden	53
2	Poland	50
3	Great Britain	36
4	Russia	17

== Heat details ==
Placing	Team / Rider name	Total	1	2	3	4	5	6	7	8	9	10	11	12	13	14	15	16	17	18	19	20	21	22	23	24	25
1	Sweden	53	2	5	6	9	9	9	11	13	16	18	21	21	24	27	30	33	36	36	38	41	44	47	48	50	53
1	(1) Jonas Davidsson	10	2						2								3				2				1
1	(2) Andreas Jonsson (c)	13		3						2			3									3				2
1	(3) Peter Ljung	10			1						3			0				3									3
1	(4) Fredrik Lindgren	14				3						2			3				3				3
1	(5) Daniel Nermark	6					0	0								3				0				3
2	Poland	50	3	5	8	9	11	14	15	16	18	21	23	26	27	29	31	32	34	37	38	39	41	41	45	48	50
2	(1) Tomasz Gollob (c)	10	3							1						2			2								2
2	(2) Wiesław Jaguś	11		2							2						2			3			2
2	(3) Rune Holta	9			3							3	2								1			E3
2	(4) Grzegorz Walasek	12				1		3						3								1			4J
2	(5) Jarosław Hampel	8					2		1						1			1								3
Placing	Team / Rider name	Total	1	2	3	4	5	6	7	8	9	10	11	12	13	14	15	16	17	18	19	20	21	22	23	24	25
3	Great Britain	37	0	1	3	5	8	10	13	16	16	17	18	19	21	22	24	26	28	30	30	32	33	35	35	36	37
3	(1) Lee Richardson	4	0					2					1					-					1
3	(2) Tai Woffinden	10		1					3					1					2					2		1
3	(3) Chris Harris	11			2					3					2			2		2					0
3	(4) Edward Kennett	3				2					Fx					1					0					-
3	(5) Scott Nicholls (c)	9					3					1					2J					2					1
4	Russia	17	1	1	1	1	2	3	3	3	4	4	4	6	6	6	6	6	6	7	10	10	10	11	17	17	17
4	(1) Denis Gizatullin (c)	3	1								1				0			0				0		1
4	(2) Sergey Darkin	0		N								-				-		-							-
4	(3) Daniil Ivanov	1			0			1				0					E4		0							0
4	(4) Renat Gafurov	1				X			0				0			E4				1							E4
4	(5) Grigory Laguta	12					1			E4				2							3		Fx		6J
Placing	Team / Rider name	Total	1	2	3	4	5	6	7	8	9	10	11	12	13	14	15	16	17	18	19	20	21	22	23	24	25

M - exclusion for exceeding two minute time allowance • T - exclusion for touching the tapes • X - other exclusion • E - retired or mechanical failure • F - fell

Helmet colours were permanent for each team (red, blue, white and yellow/black). Colours in tables show gate positions:
gate A – inside	gate B	gate C	gate D – outside

=== Heat after heat ===
1. Gollob, Davidsson, Gizatullin, Richardson
2. Jonsson, Jaguś, Woffinden
3. Holta, Harris, Ljung, Iwanow
4. Lindgren, Kennett, Walasek, Gafurov (X)
5. Nicholls, Hampel, Laguta, Nermark
6. Walasek, Richardson, Iwanow, Nermark
7. Woffinden, Davidsson, Hampel, Gafurov
8. Harris, Jonsson, Gollob, Laguta
9. Ljung, Jaguś, Gizatullin, Kennett (Fx)
10. Holta, Lindgren, Nicholls, Iwanow
11. Jonsson, Holta, Richardson, Gafurov
12. Walasek, Laguta, Woffinden, Ljung
13. Lindgren, Harris, Hampel, Gizatullin
14. Nermark, Gollob, Kennett, Gafurov (e4)
15. Davidsson, Jaguś, Nicholls (2 - joker), Iwanow
16. Ljung, Harris, Hampel, Gizatullin
17. Lindgren, Gollob, Woffinden, Iwanow
18. Jaguś, Harris, Gafurov, Nermark
19. Laguta, Davidsson, Holta, Kennett
20. Jonsson, Nicholls, Walasek, Gizatullin
21. Lindgren, Jaguś, Richardson, Laguta (X)
22. Nermark, Woffinden, Gizatullin, Holta (e3)
23. Laguta (6 - joker), Walasek (4 - joker), Davidsson, Harris
24. Hampel, Jonsson, Woffinden, Iwanow
25. Ljung, Gollob, Nicholls, Gafurov (e4)

== See also ==
- 2008 Speedway World Cup
- motorcycle speedway
