= 2016 Speedway World Cup Event 2 =

2016 FIM Speedway World Cup – Event 2
Information
- Date: 26 July 2016
- City: Västervik
- Event: 2 of 4
- Referee: Piotr Lis

Stadium details
- Stadium: Stena Arena
- Capacity: 10,000
- Length: 296 m
- Track: speedway track

SWC Results
Winner		Sweden - 48 pts
Runner-up		Australia - 37 pts
3rd place		United States - 22 pts
4th place		Germany - 19 pts

Event Two of the 2016 Monster Energy FIM Speedway World Cup was the second race of the 2016 edition of the Speedway World Cup. It was staged on July 26 at the Stena Arena in Västervik, Sweden and was won by hosts and defending champions Sweden from Australia, United States, and Germany. As a result, Sweden progressed directly to the 2016 Speedway World Cup Final, while Australia and United States progressed to the 2016 Speedway World Cup Race-off. Germany were eliminated.

Antonio Lindbäck and Andreas Jonsson led Sweden success by scoring 13 points each, with Fredrik Lindgren and Peter Ljung scored 11 each to earn Sweden 48 points. Jason Doyle top scored for Australia with 12 points, while Greg Hancock guided United States to third by scoring 17 points.

== Results ==
Pos.	National team	Pts.
1	Sweden	48
2	Australia	37
3	United States	22
4	Germany	19

== Scores ==
(Sweden)	SWEDEN	48
No	Rider Name	Pts.	Heats
1	Antonio Lindbäck	13	2,3,2,3,3
2	Fredrik Lindgren	11	X,3,3,3,2
3	Andreas Jonsson	13	3,3,2,2,3
4	Peter Ljung	11	2,2,2,2,3
5	Joel Andersson	0

(Australia)	AUSTRALIA	37
No	Rider Name	Pts.	Heats
1	Chris Holder	11	3,2,1,2,3
2	Sam Masters	5	2,1,0,0,2
3	Max Fricke	9	3,2,2,0,2
4	Jason Doyle	12	2,3,3,3,1
5	Brady Kurtz	0

(United States)	UNITED STATES	22
No	Rider Name	Pts.	Heats
1	Greg Hancock	17	3,1,3,6,2,2
2	Ryan Fisher	2	1,0,0,1,0
3	Billy Janniro	2	1,0,1,0,0
4	Ricky Wells	1	0,0,1,0
5	Luke Becker	0

(Germany)	GERMANY	19
No	Rider Name	Pts.	Heats
1	Kevin Wölbert	2	1,1,0,0,0
2	Kai Huckenbeck	1	0,0,0,1
3	Tobias Kroner	4	0,1,1,1,1
4	Martin Smolinski	12	1,2,3,1,4,1
5

== See also ==
- 2016 Speedway Grand Prix
