= 2008 Speedway World Cup Event 1 =

2008 FIM NordicBet Speedway World Cup - Event 1
Information
- Date: 12 July 2008
- City: Leszno
- Event: 1 of 4 (32)
- Referee: Krister Gardell
- Jury President: János Nádasdi

Stadium details
- Stadium: Alfred Smoczyk Stadium

SWC Results
- Attendance: 8,000
- Best Time: (Australia) Leigh Adams; 59.77 secs (in Heat 2)
Winner		Australia - 56+3 pts
Runner-up		Poland - 56+2 pts
3rd place		Russia - 36 pts
4th place		Hungary - 10 pts

The 2008 Speedway World Cup Event 1 was the first race of the 2008 Speedway World Cup season. It took place on July 12, 2008 in the Alfred Smoczyk Stadium in Leszno, Poland.

== Results ==
Pos.	National team	Pts.
1	Australia	56+3
2	Poland	56+2
3	Russia	36
4	Hungary	10

== Heat details ==
Placing	Team / Rider name	Total	1	2	3	4	5	6	7	8	9	10	11	12	13	14	15	16	17	18	19	20	21	22	23	24	25	26
1	Australia	56	3	6	8	10	13	14	16	19	22	24	26	29	30	30	31	33	36	37	43	46	49	52	53	54	56
1	(1) Jason Crump	11	3					1					2					2					3
1	(2) Leigh Adams (C)	20		3					2					3					3		6J			3				3
1	(3) Ryan Sullivan	8			2					3					1					1					1
1	(4) Davey Watt	6				2					3					0					-					1
1	(5) Chris Holder	11					3					2					1					3					2	style="background-color:" |
2	Poland	56	1	3	6	9	10	13	16	18	20	23	26	28	31	34	36	39	40	43	43	45	46	48	50	53	56
2	(1) Krzysztof Kasprzak	10	1								2				3							2		2
2	(2) Rune Holta	13		2								3				3		3							2
2	(3) Tomasz Gollob (C)	12			3			3									2		1							3
2	(4) Jarosław Hampel	15				3			3				3							3							3	2
2	(5) Wiesław Jaguś	6					1			2				2							E1		1
Placing	Team / Rider name	Total	1	2	3	4	5	6	7	8	9	10	11	12	13	14	15	16	17	18	19	20	21	22	23	24	25	26
3	Russia	36	0	1	2	3	5	7	8	9	10	11	12	13	15	17	20	21	21	23	25	26	26	27	33	35	36
3	(1) Denis Gizatullin (C)	7	0						1								3				2			1	-
3	(2) Grigory Laguta	7		1						1			1		2							-				2
3	(3) Daniil Ivanov	5			1						1			1				1									1	style="background-color:" |
3	(4) Renat Gafurov	3				1						1			-				0			1	0
3	(5) Emil Saifutdinov	14					2	2								2				2				-	6J
4	Hungary	10	2	2	2	2	2	2	2	2	2	2	2	2	2	3	3	3	5	5	6	6	10	10	10	10	10
4	(1) Matej Ferján	9	2							0						1			2				4J				E3
4	(2) Sándor Tihanyi (C)	0		T							0						0			0			-
4	(3) József Tabaka	1			0							0	0								1			0		0
4	(4) Norbert Magosi	0				0		0						0								0			0
4	(5) László Szatmári	0					0		E						0			E								-
Placing	Team / Rider name	Total	1	2	3	4	5	6	7	8	9	10	11	12	13	14	15	16	17	18	19	20	21	22	23	24	25	26

M - exclusion for exceeding two minute time allowance • T - exclusion for touching the tapes • X - other exclusion • E - retired or mechanical failure • F - fell

Helmet colours were permanent for each team (red, blue, white and yellow/black). Colours in tables show gate positions:
gate A – inside	gate B	gate C	gate D – outside

=== Heat after heat ===
1. (61.01) Crump, Ferjan, Kasprzak, Gizatullin
2. (59.77) Adams, Holta, Laguta, Tihanyi (T)
3. (61.40) Gollob, Sullivan, Iwanow, Tabaka
4. (61.44) Hampel, Watt, Gafurov, Magosi
5. (61.63) Holder, Saifutdinov, Jaguś, Szatmari
6. (60.75) Gollob, Saifutdinov, Crump, Magosi
7. (61.08) Hampel, Adams, Gizatullin, Szatmari (e4)
8. (61.52) Sullivan, Jaguś, Laguta, Ferjan
9. (62.03) Watt, Kasprzak, Iwanow, Tihanyi
10. (62.15) Holta, Holder, Gafurov, Tabaka
11. (61.51) Hampel, Crump, Laguta, Tabaka
12. (61.80) Adams, Jaguś, Iwanow, Magosi
13. (62.64) Kasprzak, Laguta, Sullivan, Szatmari
14. (62.43) Holta, Saifutdinov, Ferjan, Watt
15. (62.51) Gizatullin, Gollob, Holder, Tihanyi
16. (61.70) Holta, Crump, Iwanow, Szatmari
17. (61.68) Adams, Ferjan, Gollob, Gafurov
18. (62.20) Hampel, Saifutdinov, Sullivan, Tihanyi
19. (62.16) Adams(J), Gizatullin, Tabaka, Jaguś (e4)
20. (62.98) Holder, Kasprzak, Laguta, Magosi
21. (62.37) Crump, Ferjan(J), Jaguś, Gafurov
22. (62.23) Adams, Kasprzak, Gizatullin, Tabaka
23. (63.48) Saifutdinov(J), Holta, Sullivan, Magosi
24. (63.44) Gollob, Laguta, Watt, Szatmari
25. (62.94) Hampel, Holder, Iwanow, Ferjan (e3)
  First Place Run-Off:
26. (62.94) Adams, Hampel

== See also ==
- 2008 Speedway World Cup
- motorcycle speedway
