= 2004 Speedway World Cup Race-off =

Information
- Date: 5 August 2004
- City: Poole
- Event: 3 of 4 (18)

Stadium details
- Stadium: Poole Stadium

SWC Results
| Winner | | Sweden - 49 pts |
| Runner-up | | Poland - 43 pts |
| 3rd place | | Australia - 42 pts |
| 4th place | | Czech Republic - 17 pts |

The 2004 Speedway World Cup Race-off was the third race of the 2004 Speedway World Cup season. It took place on 5 August 2004 in the Poole Stadium in Poole, Great Britain.

== Results ==
| Pos. | National team | Pts. |
|---|---|---|
| 1 | Sweden | 49 |
| 2 | Poland | 43 |
| 3 | Australia | 42 |
| 4 | Czech Republic | 17 |

== Heat details ==
| Placing | Team / Rider name | Total | 1 | 2 | 3 | 4 | 5 | 6 | 7 | 8 | 9 | 10 | 11 | 12 | 13 | 14 | 15 | 16 | 17 | 18 | 19 | 20 | 21 | 22 | 23 | 24 | 25 |
| 1 | Sweden | 49 | 1 | 2 | 2 | 4 | 7 | 8 | 10 | 10 | 12 | 15 | 17 | 20 | 23 | 25 | 27 | 27 | 28 | 30 | 33 | 35 | 37 | 40 | 43 | 46 | 49 |
| 1 | (1) Mikael Max | 6 | 1 | | | | | 1 | | | | | 2 | | | | | X | | | | | 2 |
| 1 | (2) Tony Rickardsson | 10 | | 1 | | | | | 2 | | | | | 3 | | | | | 1 | | | | | 3 |
| 1 | (3) Antonio Lindbäck | 8 | | | X | | | | | X | | | | | 3 | | | | | 2 | | | | | 3 |
| 1 | (4) Andreas Jonsson | 12 | | | | 2 | | | | | 2 | | | | | 2 | | | | | 3 | | | | | 3 |
| 1 | (5) Peter Karlsson | 13 | | | | | 3 | | | | | 3 | | | | | 2 | | | | | 2 | | | | | 3 |
| 2 | Poland | 43 | 3 | 6 | 8 | 9 | 11 | 11 | 12 | 14 | 17 | 19 | 22 | 24 | 25 | 28 | 28 | 31 | 33 | 33 | 34 | 35 | 38 | 40 | 40 | 41 | 43 |
| 2 | (1) Grzegorz Walasek | 5 | 3 | | | | | | 1 | | | | | | | | 0 | | | | 1 | | | | 0 |
| 2 | (2) Jarosław Hampel | 10 | | 3 | | | | | | 2 | | | 3 | | | | | | | | | 1 | | | | 1 |
| 2 | (3) Tomasz Gollob | 12 | | | 2 | | | | | | 3 | | | 2 | | | | 3 | | | | | | | | | 2 |
| 2 | (4) Janusz Kołodziej | 9 | | | | 1 | | | | | | 2 | | | 1 | | | | 2 | | | | 3 |
| 2 | (5) Krzysztof Kasprzak | 7 | | | | | 2 | 0 | | | | | | | | 3 | | | | 0 | | | | 2 |
| Placing | Team / Rider name | Total | 1 | 2 | 3 | 4 | 5 | 6 | 7 | 8 | 9 | 10 | 11 | 12 | 13 | 14 | 15 | 16 | 17 | 18 | 19 | 20 | 21 | 22 | 23 | 24 | 25 |
| 3 | Australia | 42 | 0 | 2 | 5 | 8 | 8 | 11 | 14 | 15 | 15 | 16 | 17 | 17 | 19 | 20 | 23 | 25 | 28 | 31 | 33 | 36 | 36 | 37 | 38 | 40 | 42 |
| 3 | (1) Ryan Sullivan | 6 | 0 | | | | | | | | 0 | | | | 2 | | | | | | | 3 | | 1 |
| 3 | (2) Steve Johnston | 7 | | 2 | | | | | | | | 1 | | | | 1 | | 2 | | | | | | | 1 |
| 3 | (3) Leigh Adams | 14 | | | 3 | | | 3 | | | | | | | | | 3 | | 3 | | | | | | | 2 |
| 3 | (4) Jason Crump | 12 | | | | 3 | | | 3 | | | | 1 | | | | | | | 3 | | | | | | | 2J |
| 3 | (5) Craig Boyce | 3 | | | | | 0 | | | 1 | | | | 0 | | | | | | | 2 | | 0 |
| 4 | Czech Republic | 17 | 2 | 2 | 3 | 3 | 4 | 6 | 6 | 9 | 10 | 10 | 10 | 11 | 11 | 11 | 12 | 13 | 13 | 14 | 14 | 14 | 15 | 15 | 17 | 17 | 17 |
| 4 | (1) Tomáš Topinka | 5 | 2 | | | | | | | 3 | | | | | 0 | 0 | | | 0 | | | | | | | | 0 |
| 4 | (2) Aleš Dryml, Jr. | 4 | | 0 | | | | | | | 1 | | | | | | 1 | | | 1 | | | 1 |
| 4 | (3) Bohumil Brhel | 1 | | | 1 | | | | | | | 0 | 0 | | | | | | | | X | | | 0 |
| 4 | (4) Lukáš Dryml | 5 | | | | 0 | | 2 | | | | | | 1 | | | | | | | | 0 | | | 2 |
| 4 | (5) Josef Franc | 2 | | | | | 1 | | 0 | | | | | | - | | | 1 | | | | | | | | 0 |
| Placing | Team / Rider name | Total | 1 | 2 | 3 | 4 | 5 | 6 | 7 | 8 | 9 | 10 | 11 | 12 | 13 | 14 | 15 | 16 | 17 | 18 | 19 | 20 | 21 | 22 | 23 | 24 | 25 |

M - exclusion for exceeding two minute time allowance • T - exclusion for touching the tapes • X - other exclusion • E - retired or mechanical failure • F - fell

Helmet colours were permanent for each team (red, blue, white and yellow/black). Colours in tables show gate positions:
| gate A – inside | gate B | gate C | gate D – outside |

== See also ==
- 2004 Speedway World Cup
- motorcycle speedway
