= 2007 Speedway World Cup Race-off =

Information
- Date: 19 July 2007
- City: Leszno
- Event: 3 of 4 (30)
- Referee: Anthony Steele

Stadium details
- Stadium: Alfred Smoczyk Stadium

SWC Results
- Attendance: 10,000
- Best Time: (Australia) Leigh Adams; 59.20 secs (in Heat 9)
Winner		Australia - 53 pts
Runner-up		Poland - 52 pts
3rd place		Sweden - 40 pts
4th place		Russia - 7 pts

The 2007 Speedway World Cup Race-off was the third race of the 2007 Speedway World Cup season. It took place on July 19, 2007 in the Alfred Smoczyk Stadium in Leszno, Poland.

== Results ==
Pos.	National team	Pts.
1	Australia	53
2	Poland	52
3	Sweden	40
4	Russia	7

== Heat details ==
Placing	Team / Rider Name	Total	1	2	3	4	5	6	7	8	9	10	11	12	13	14	15	16	17	18	19	20	21	22	23	24	25
1	Australia	53	3	5	8	9	12	14	15	18	21	22	23	24	25	28	30	33	34	37	40	41	43	46	49	50	53
1	(1) Ryan Sullivan	12	3						1								2				3				3
1	(2) Chris Holder	8		2						3			1									1				1
1	(3) Leigh Adams	13			3						3			1				3									3
1	(4) Rory Schlein	6				1						1			1				1				2
1	(5) Jason Crump	14					3	2								3				3				3
1	(6) Davey Watt	-
2	Poland	52	1	4	6	6	7	8	10	11	13	15	18	21	24	26	29	31	34	36	38	41	44	46	47	50	52
2	(1) Tomasz Gollob	11	1								2				3							3		2
2	(2) Damian Baliński	10		3								2				2		2							1
2	(3) Jarosław Hampel	12			2			1									3		3							3
2	(4) Grzegorz Walasek	9				0			2				3							2							2
2	(5) Krzysztof Kasprzak	10					1			1				3							2		3
2	(6) Rune Holta	-
Placing	Team / Rider Name	Total	1	2	3	4	5	6	7	8	9	10	11	12	13	14	15	16	17	18	19	20	21	22	23	24	25
3	Sweden	40	2	2	2	4	6	9	12	14	15	18	20	22	24	25	26	27	29	30	30	34	35	35	37	39	40
3	(1) Jonas Davidsson	9	2							2						1			2				1				1
3	(2) Andreas Jonsson	3		0							1						1			1			-
3	(3) Mikael Max	5			0							3	2								0			0
3	(4) Fredrik Lindgren	13				2		3						2								4J			2
3	(5) Peter Karlsson	10					2		3						2			1								2
3	(6) Sebastian Aldén	-
4	Russia	7	0	1	2	5	5	5	5	5	5	5	5	5	5	5	5	5	5	5	6	6	6	7	7	7	7
4	(1) Denis Gizatullin	0	0					0					0					E4					E4
4	(2) Daniil Ivanov	2		1					0					0					0					1
4	(3) Emil Saifutdinov	1			1					0					0					0					0
4	(4) Roman Ivanov	4				3					0					0					1					0J
4	(5) Renat Gafurov	0					0					0					0					0					0
4	(6) None	-
Placing	Team / Rider Name	Total	1	2	3	4	5	6	7	8	9	10	11	12	13	14	15	16	17	18	19	20	21	22	23	24	25

M - exclusion for exceeding two minute time allowance • T - exclusion for touching the tapes • X - other exclusion • E - retired or mechanical failure • F - fell

Helmet colours was permanent for each teams (Red, Blue, White and Yellow/Black). Colours in diagrams means gate positions:
gate A – inside	gate B	gate C	gate D – outside

=== Heat after heat ===
1. Sullivan, Davidsson, Gollob, Gizatulin
2. Baliński, Holder, D.Iwanow, Jonsson
3. Adams, Hampel, Sajfutdinow, Max
4. R.Iwanow, Lindgren, Schlein, Walasek
5. Crump, Karlsson, Kasprzak, Gafurow
6. Lindgren, Crump, Hampel, Gizatulin
7. Karlsson, Walasek, Sullivan, D.Iwanow
8. Holder, Davidsson, Kasprzak, Sajfutdinow
9. Adams, Gollob, Jonsson, R.Iwanow
10. Max, Baliński, Schlein, Gafurow
11. Walasek, Max, Holder, Gizatulin
12. Kasprzak, Lindgren, Adams, D.Iwanow
13. Gollob, Karlsson, Schlein, Sajfutdinow
14. Crump, Baliński, Davidsson, R.Iwanow
15. Hampel, Sullivan, Jonsson, Gafurow
16. Adams, Baliński, Karlsson, Gizatulin(e4)
17. Hampel, Davidsson, Schlein, D.Iwanow
18. Crump, Walasek, Jonsson, Sajfutdinow
19. Sullivan, Kasprzak, R.Iwanow, Max
20. Gollob, Lindgren(joker), Holder, Gafurow
21. Kasprzak, Schlein, Davidsson, Gizatulin(e4)
22. Crump, Gollob, D.Iwanow, Max
23. Sullivan, Lindgren, Baliński, Sajfutdinow
24. Hampel, Karlsson, Holder, R.Iwanow(joker)
25. Adams, Walasek, Davidsson, Gafurow

== See also ==
- 2007 Speedway World Cup
- motorcycle speedway
