= 2016 Speedway World Cup =

57th edition of the annual motorcycle speedway World Cup competition

Speedway World Cup
- Venue: National Speedway Stadium
- Location: England
- Start date: 23 July
- End date: 30 July
- Nations: 9

Champions
- Poland

The 2016 Monster Energy FIM Speedway World Cup (SWC) was the sixteenth FIM Speedway World Cup, the annual international speedway world championship tournament. It took place between 23 July and 30 July 2016 and involved nine national teams. It was won by Poland, the first time they achieved success since 2013, and the seventh time in total. They beat hosts Great Britain by seven points, while defending champions Sweden finished third with Australia in fourth.

== Qualification ==
(Italy) Pista Olimpia Terenzano, Terenzano - 2 June 2016

National team	Pts	Scorers
Germany	46	Tobias Kroner 13, Martin Smolinski 12, Kai Huckenbeck 11, Kevin Wölbert 10
Latvia	31	Andžejs Ļebedevs 17, Kjasts Puodžuks 8, Maksims Bogdanovs 6, Davis Kurmis 0
Italy	29	Nicolás Covatti 18, Paco Castagna 6, Guglielmo Franchetti 4, Nicolas Vicentin 1
Slovenia	20	Matej Žagar 13, Nick Škorja 4, Matic Ivačič 2, Ziga Kovacić 1

== Qualified teams ==
Team	Qualified as	Finals appearance	Last appearance	2015 place
Great Britain	Host	16th	2015	5
Sweden	2015 SWC top eight	16th	2015	1
Denmark	2015 SWC top eight	16th	2015	2
Poland	2015 SWC top eight	16th	2015	3
Australia	2015 SWC top eight	16th	2015	4
United States	2015 SWC top eight	9th	2015	6
Russia	2015 SWC top eight	13th	2015	7
Czech Republic	2015 SWC top eight	15th	2015	8
Germany	Qualifying Round Winner	7th	2012	QR

== Tournament ==
Semifinals
23 July — (Denmark) Vojens (details)
Poland	39
Denmark	36
Russia	32
Czech Republic	19
26 July — (Sweden) Vastervik (details)
Sweden	48
Australia	37
United States	22
Germany	19

Race-off
29 July — (United Kingdom) Manchester (details)
Australia	44
Denmark	41
Russia	32
United States	9

Final
30 July — (England) Manchester
Poland	39
Great Britain	32
Sweden	30
Australia	22

== Final ==
The final was staged on 30 July at the National Speedway Stadium in Manchester. It was won by Poland, the seventh time they had done so since the World Cup was launched in 2001. They beat hosts Great Britain by seven points, while defending champions Sweden finished third with Australia in fourth.

Bartosz Zmarzlik, Patryk Dudek and captain Piotr Pawlicki Jr. all scored double figures for the Poles, with Krzysztof Kasprzak, who replaced Maciej Janowski in the side for the final, backed them up with eight points. Individual world champion Tai Woffinden lead Great Britain to second place, scoring 19 points.

=== Results ===
Pos.	National team	Pts.
1	Poland	39
2	Great Britain	32
3	Sweden	27
4	Australia	22

=== Scores ===
(Poland)	POLAND	39
No	Rider Name	Pts.	Heats
1	Piotr Pawlicki Jr.	10	0,3,2,2,3
2	Bartosz Zmarzlik	11	1,3,3,1,3
3	Patryk Dudek	10	3,1,1,2,3
4	Krzysztof Kasprzak	8	1,3,2,0,2
5	Krystian Pieszczek	0

(United Kingdom)	GREAT BRITAIN	32
No	Rider Name	Pts.	Heats
1	Craig Cook	5	1,0,0,3,1
2	Tai Woffinden	19	3,2,3,6,3,2
3	Danny King	5	X,0,2,3
4	Robert Lambert	3	1,1,0,1,0
5	Adam Ellis	0

(Sweden)	SWEDEN	30
No	Rider Name	Pts.	Heats
1	Andreas Jonsson	8	3,2,0,1,2
2	Antonio Lindbäck	6	3,2,1,0
3	Peter Ljung	6	2,1,1,1,1
4	Fredrik Lindgren	10	2,2,1,3,1,1
5	Joel Andersson	0

(Australia)	AUSTRALIA	22
No	Rider Name	Pts.	Heats
1	Jason Doyle	7	0,3,2,X,2
2	Josh Grajczonek	0	0,0,0
3	Chris Holder	10	2,1,2,3,2,0
4	Sam Masters	5	2,0,3,0,0,0
5	Brady Kurtz	0

== Final classification ==
Pos.	National team	Pts.
Gold	Poland	39
Silver	Great Britain	32
Bronze	Sweden	30
4	Australia	22
5	Denmark	41
6	Russia	32
7	United States	9
=8	Czech Republic	19
=8	Germany	19
