= 2006 Speedway World Cup =

47th edition of the annual motorcycle speedway World Cup competition

FIM ASL Freight Movements Speedway World Cup
- Venue: Smallmead Stadium
- Location: England
- Start date: 16 July
- End date: 22 July
- Nations: 8

Champions
- Denmark

The 2006 Speedway World Cup (SWC) was the 6th FIM Speedway World Cup season. The Final took place on 22 July 2006 in the Smallmead Stadium in Reading, Berkshire, England. The tournament was won by Denmark (45 pts) and they beat Sweden (37 pts), host team Great Britain (36 pts) and Australia (35 pts) in the Final. The defending champion Poland did not qualify to the Final.

== Qualification ==
- Qualifying round 1
- (Latvia) Stadium Lokomotīve, Daugavpils

Pos.	National team	Pts.
1	Finland	42
2	Germany	39+3
3	Russia	39+2
4	Latvia	30

- Qualifying round 2
- (Hungary) Borsod Volán Stadion, Miskolc

Pos.	National team	Pts.
1	United States	59
2	Slovenia	41
3	Hungary	25+3
4	Italy	25+2

== Tournament ==
Semifinals
16 July - Rybnik (details)
Australia	49
Great Britain	48
Poland	48
Finland	9
18 July - Målilla (details)
Sweden	56
Denmark	53
United States	39
Czech Republic	7

Race-off
20 July - Reading (details)
Denmark	49
Great Britain	42
Poland	35
United States	28

Final
22 July - Reading
Denmark	45
Sweden	37
Great Britain	36
Australia	35

== Final ==
The 2006 Speedway World Cup Final took place on 22 July at Smallmead Stadium in Reading.

=== Results ===
Pos.	National team	Pts.
1	Denmark	45
2	Sweden	37
3	Great Britain	36
4	Australia	35

=== Heat details ===
Placing	Team / Rider Name	Total	1	2	3	4	5	6	7	8	9	10	11	12	13	14	15	16	17	18	19	20	21	22	23	24	25
1	Denmark	45	0	3	4	7	9	12	15	15	16	18	21	23	23	26	27	29	31	31	32	33	34	37	40	42	45
1	(1) Niels Kristian Iversen	5	0								1				0							1		3
1	(2) Nicki Pedersen	13		3								2				3		2							3
1	(3) Bjarne Pedersen	9			1			3									1		2							2
1	(4) Hans N. Andersen (c)	12				3			3				3							X							3
1	(5) Charlie Gjedde	6					2			0				2							1		1
2	Sweden	37	3	5	7	8	9	10	10	13	16	16	17	17	18	20	20	22	25	26	26	26	29	31	33	36	37
2	(1) Andreas Jonsson (c)	14	3							3						2		2	3								1
2	(2) Antonio Lindbäck	11		2							3						0			1			3		2
2	(3) Fredrik Lindgren	5			2							0	1								0			2
2	(4) Mikael Max	2				1		1						0								0			-
2	(5) Peter Karlsson	5					1		0						1			-								3
Placing	Team / Rider Name	Total	1	2	3	4	5	6	7	8	9	10	11	12	13	14	15	16	17	18	19	20	21	22	23	24	25
3	Great Britain	36	2	3	6	6	6	6	7	8	8	9	11	14	18	18	20	23	23	26	28	30	32	33	33	34	36
3	(1) Lee Richardson	7	2						1								2				2				0
3	(2) Mark Loram	7		1						1			2									2				1
3	(3) Scott Nicholls (c)	15			3						0			3	4J			3									2
3	(4) Chris Louis	3				0						1			-				0				2
3	(5) Chris Harris	4					0	0								0				3				1
4	Australia	35	1	1	1	3	6	8	10	12	14	17	17	18	21	22	25	25	26	28	31	34	34	34	35	35	35
4	(1) Travis McGowan	3	1					2					0					0					X
4	(2) Ryan Sullivan	4		0					2					1					1					0
4	(3) Todd Wiltshire	8			0					2					3					2					1
4	(4) Leigh Adams (c)	8				2					2					1					3					0
4	(5) Jason Crump	12					3					3					3					3					FJ
Placing	Team / Rider Name	Total	1	2	3	4	5	6	7	8	9	10	11	12	13	14	15	16	17	18	19	20	21	22	23	24	25

M - exclusion for exceeding two minute time allowance • T - exclusion for touching the tapes • X - other exclusion • E - retired or mechanical failure • F - fell

Helmet colours was permanent for each teams (Red, Blue, White and Yellow/Black). Colours in diagrams means gate positions:
gate A – inside	gate B	gate C	gate D – outside

== Final classification ==
Pos.	National team	Pts.
Gold	Denmark	45
Silver	Sweden	37
Bronze	Great Britain	36
4	Australia	35
5	Poland	35
6	United States	28
7	Finland	9
8	Czech Republic	7
