= 2015 Speedway World Cup Race-off =

2015 FIM Speedway World Cup – Race Off
Information
- Date: 11 June 2015
- City: Vojens
- Event: 3 of 4

Stadium details
- Stadium: Vojens Speedway Center
- Capacity: 22,000
- Length: 300 m
- Track: speedway track

SWC Results

The 2015 Monster Energy FIM Speedway World Cup Race Off was the third race of the 2015 edition of the Speedway World Cup. It was run on June 11 at the Vojens Speedway Center in Vojens, Denmark and was won by Poland from Great Britain, the United States, and Russia. As a result, Poland progressed to the 2015 Speedway World Cup Final, where they will join hosts and defending champions Denmark, Event One winners Sweden and Event Two winners Australia. Great Britain finished second, but were eliminated from the competition along with the United States and Russia.

Poland were led to victory by stand-in captain Maciej Janowski, and he was well supported by Krzysztof Buczkowski, Przemysław Pawlicki and Bartosz Zmarzlik, who all scored double figures. Great Britain's Tai Woffinden was the star of the meeting, scoring an unbeaten 21-point maximum. His haul was not enough for his country though, as they fell short of reaching the final by five points. Russia were forced to compete with just three riders after Artem Laguta fell ill and Grigory Laguta broke down en route to the track.

== Results ==
| Pos. | National team | Pts. |
|---|---|---|
| 1 | Poland | 48 |
| 2 | Great Britain | 43 |
| 3 | United States | 22 |
| 4 | Russia | 11 |

== Scores ==
| (Poland) | POLAND | 48 |
| No | Rider Name | Pts. | Heats |
| 1 | Maciej Janowski | 14 | 2,3,3,3,3 |
| 2 | Przemysław Pawlicki | 11 | 3,3,X,2,3 |
| 3 | Krzysztof Buczkowski | 13 | 3,3,2,2,3 |
| 4 | Bartosz Zmarzlik | 10 | 2,1,3,2,2 |

| (United Kingdom) | GREAT BRITAIN | 43 |
| No | Rider Name | Pts. | Heats |
| 1 | Danny King | 7 | 1,2,2,0,2 |
| 2 | Tai Woffinden | 21 | 3,3,3,6,3,3 |
| 3 | Robert Lambert | 8 | 3,1,3,1 |
| 4 | Chris Harris | 7 | 2,2,0,1,2 |

| (United States) | UNITED STATES | 22 |
| No | Rider Name | Pts. | Heats |
| 1 | Gino Manzares | 3 | 1,0,1,1,0 |
| 2 | Ryan Fisher | 5 | 1,1,2,1,0 |
| 3 | Greg Hancock | 12 | 2,2,2,1,3,2 |
| 4 | Max Ruml | 2 | 0,1,0,1 |

| (Russia) | RUSSIA | 11 |
| No | Rider Name | Pts. | Heats |
| 1 | Renat Gafurov | 2 | 0,0,0,2,0 |
| 2 | No Rider |
| 3 | Vitaly Belousov | 5 | 0,2,0,1,1,1 |
| 4 | Andrey Kudryashov | 4 | 1,0,2,0,0,1 |

== See also ==
- 2015 Speedway Grand Prix
