= 2009 Speedway World Cup Race-off =

FIM Tobet Speedway World Cup Race-Off
Information
- Date: 16 July 2009
- City: Leszno
- Event: 3 of 4 (38)
- Referee: Istvan Darago
- Jury President: Armando Castagna

Stadium details
- Stadium: Alfred Smoczyk Stadium
- Length: 330 m
- Track: speedway track

SWC Results
Winner		Australia - 51 pts
Runner-up		Sweden - 39 pts
3rd place		Great Britain - 35 pts
4th place		Denmark - 34 pts

The FIM Tobet Speedway World Cup Race-Off was the third meeting of the 2009 Speedway World Cup tournament. It took place on 16 July 2009 in the Alfred Smoczyk Stadium in Leszno, Poland.

The Race-off was won by Australian team (51 points). Australia and Sweden (39 pts) qualifying to Saturday's World Cup Final at Leszno also. Third Great Britain (35 pts) and fourth Denmark (34 pts) was knocked out of the competition.

== Results ==
Pos.	National team	Pts.
1	Australia	51
2	Sweden	39
3	Great Britain	35
4	Denmark	34

== Heat details ==
Placing	Team / Rider Name	Total	1	2	3	4	5	6	7	8	9	10	11	12	13	14	15	16	17	18	19	20	21	22	23	24	25
1	Australia	51	3	4	7	10	13	16	19	20	22	24	26	28	28	31	33	34	37	40	41	41	44	46	48	48	51
1	(1) Davey Watt	11	3						3								2				1				2
1	(2) Adam Shields	4		1						1			2									0				F3
1	(3) Leigh Adams (c)	11			3						2			2				1									3
1	(4) Chris Holder	11				3						2			Fx				3				3
1	(5) Jason Crump	14					3	3								3				3				2
2	Sweden	39	0	0	2	4	6	8	8	10	11	12	13	16	19	20	20	20	22	22	25	26	26	29	35	37	39
2	(1) Antonio Lindbäck	10	0								1				3							1		3			2
2	(2) David Ruud	2		0								1				1		0							-
2	(3) Fredrik Lindgren	8			2			2									0		2							2
2	(4) Jonas Davidsson	3				2			0				1							0							-
2	(5) Andreas Jonsson (c)	16					2			2				3							3		0		6J
Placing	Team / Rider Name	Total	1	2	3	4	5	6	7	8	9	10	11	12	13	14	15	16	17	18	19	20	21	22	23	24	25
3	Great Britain	35	1	4	4	4	4	4	6	9	12	12	18	19	21	23	24	26	27	29	29	31	33	34	34	35	35
3	(1) Chris Harris (c)	9	1							3						2			1			2					0
3	(2) Lee Richardson	17		3							3		6J				1			2			2
3	(3) Lewis Bridger	0			E4							T	-								0			-
3	(4) Daniel King	1				0		0						1								-			0
3	(5) Tai Woffinden	8					0		2						2			2						1		1
4	Denmark	34	2	4	5	6	7	8	9	9	9	12	12	12	13	13	16	22	22	23	25	28	29	29	30	33	34
4	(1) Patrick Hougaard	6	2					1					0					-			2		1
4	(2) Nicolai Klindt	6		2					1					0					0					-		3
4	(3) Niels Kristian Iversen	4			1					0					1					1					1
4	(4) Hans N. Andersen (c)	1				1					0					0					-			0		-
4	(5) Kenneth Bjerre	17					1					3					3	6J				3					1
Placing	Team / Rider Name	Total	1	2	3	4	5	6	7	8	9	10	11	12	13	14	15	16	17	18	19	20	21	22	23	24	25

M - exclusion for exceeding two minute time allowance • T - exclusion for touching the tapes • X - other exclusion • E - retired or mechanical failure • F - fell

Helmet colours was permanent for each teams (Red, Blue, White and Yellow/Black). Colours in diagrams means gate positions:
gate A – inside	gate B	gate C	gate D – outside

=== Heat after heat ===
1. Watt, Hougaard, Harris, Lindbäck
2. Richardson, Klindt, Shields, Ruud
3. Adams, Lindgren, Iversen, Bridger (E3)
4. Holder, Davidsson, Andersen, King
5. Crump, Jonsson, Bjerre, Woffinden
6. Crump, Lindgren, Hougaard, King
7. Watt, Woffinden, Klindt, Davidsson
8. Harris, Jonsson, Shields, Iversen
9. Richardson, Adams, Lindbäck, Andersen
10. Bjerre, Holder, Ruud, Bridger (T)
  Bridger excluded after touching the tapes - race restarted.
11. Richardson (6 pts), Shields, Davidsson, Hougaard
12. Jonsson, Adams, King, Klindt
13. Lindbäck, Woffinden, Iversen, Holder (Fx)
14. Crump, Harris, Ruud, Andersen
15. Bjerre, Watt, Richardson, Lindgren
16. Bjerre (6 pts), Woffinden, Adams, Ruud
17. Holder, Lindgren, Harris, Klindt
18. Crump, Richardson, Iversen, Davidsson
19. Jonsson, Hougaard, Watt, Bridger
20. Bjerre, Harris, Lindbäck, Shields
21. Holder, Richardson, Hougaard, Jonsson
22. ~~Lindbäck, Crump, Andersen, Woffinden~~
  Results was canceled, because Andersen and Woffinden was started from wrong gate.
  Lindbäck, Crump, Woffinden, Andersen
23. Jonsson (6 pts), Watt, Iversen, King
24. Klindt, Lindgren, Woffinden, Shields (F3)
  Crash on final lap - Shields injured
25. Adams, Lindbäck, Bjerre, Harris

== See also ==
- 2009 Speedway World Cup
- motorcycle speedway
