= 2007 Speedway World Cup =

48th edition of the annual motorcycle speedway World Cup competition

Speedway World Cup
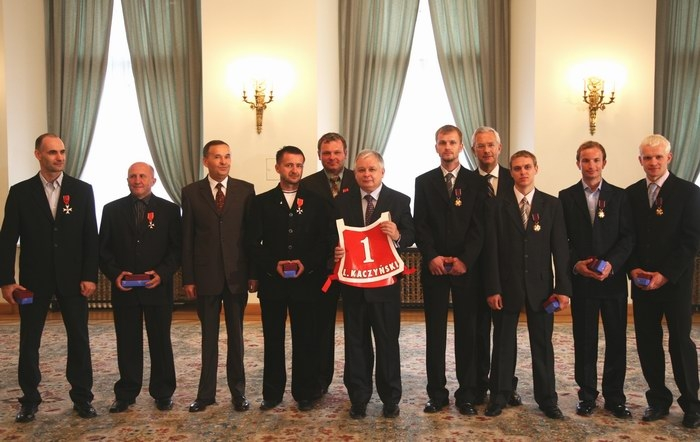
- World champions Poland
- Venue: Alfred Smoczyk Stadium
- Location: Poland
- Start date: 14 July
- End date: 21 July
- Nations: 8

Champions
- Poland

The 2007 Speedway World Cup (SWC) was the 7th FIM Speedway World Cup season. The Final took place on 21 July 2007 in the Alfred Smoczyk Stadium in Leszno, Poland. The tournament was won by host team Poland (55 pts) and they beat defending champion Denmark (52 pts), Australia (29 pts) and Great Britain (15 pts) in the Final.

== Qualification ==
- Qualifying round 1
- (Germany) Altes Stadion, Abensberg

Pos.	National team	Pts.
1	Finland	43
2	Germany	40
3	Latvia	37
4	Slovenia	29

- Qualifying round 2
- (Italy) Santa Marina Stadium, Lonigo

Pos.	National team	Pts.
1	Russia	59
2	Czech Republic	46
3	Italy	31
4	Hungary	12

== Tournament ==
Semifinals
14 July - Vojens (details)
Denmark	60
Poland	44
Australia	39
Finland	11
16 July - Coventry (details)
Great Britain	60
Sweden	49
Russia	27
United States	20

Race-off
19 July - Leszno (details)
Australia	53
Poland	52
Sweden	40
Russia	7

Final
21 July - Leszno
Poland	55
Denmark	52
Australia	29
Great Britain	15

== Final ==
The 2007 Speedway World Cup Final took place on 21 July, at the Alfred Smoczyk Stadium in Leszno.

=== Results ===
Pos.	National team	Pts.
1	Poland	55
2	Denmark	52
3	Australia	29
4	Great Britain	15

=== Heat details ===
Placing	Team / Rider name	Total	1	2	3	4	5	6	7	8	9	10	11	12	13	14	15	16	17	18	19	20	21	22	23	24	25
1	Poland	55	3	6	9	12	12	12	15	18	21	23	26	29	31	31	33	33	35	37	40	42	45	47	50	52	55
1	(1) Krzysztof Kasprzak	14	3						3								2				3				3
1	(2) Jarosław Hampel	13		3						3			3									2				2
1	(3) Tomasz Gollob (c)	12			3						3			3				0									3
1	(4) Rune Holta	12				3						2			2				2				3
1	(5) Grzegorz Walasek	0					0	0
1	(6) Damian Baliński	4														Fx				2				2
2	Denmark	52	2	3	5	7	9	12	13	15	17	20	22	24	27	29	32	34	37	40	41	44	45	46	48	51	52
2	(1) Hans N. Andersen (c)	10	2							2						2			3								1
2	(2) Kenneth Bjerre	10		1							2						3			3			1
2	(3) Niels Kristian Iversen	9			2							3	2								1			1
2	(4) Nicki Pedersen	12				2		3						2								3			2
2	(5) Bjarne Pedersen	11					2		1						3			2								3
2	(6) Jesper B. Jensen	-
Placing	Team / Rider name	Total	1	2	3	4	5	6	7	8	9	10	11	12	13	14	15	16	17	18	19	20	21	22	23	24	25
3	Australia	29	1	3	4	5	8	10	12	13	14	14	15	15	16	19	19	22	22	23	23	24	24	27	28	29	29
3	(1) Ryan Sullivan	7	1								1				1							1		3
3	(2) Jason Crump	9		2								TJ				3		3							1
3	(3) Chris Holder	3			1			2									0
3	(4) Leigh Adams (c)	5				1			2				1							1							0
3	(5) Davey Watt	4					3			1				0							0		0
3	(6) Rory Schlein	1																	0							1
4	Great Britain	15	0	0	0	0	1	2	2	2	2	3	3	4	4	5	6	7	9	9	11	11	13	13	13	13	15
4	(1) Lee Richardson	4	0					1					E3					1					2
4	(2) Simon Stead	1		0					0					1					-					0
4	(3) Edward Kennett	0			0					0					0
4	(4) Chris Harris	3				0					0					1					2					0
4	(5) Scott Nicholls (c)	7					1					1					1		2J			0					2
4	(6) Oliver Allen	0																		0					E4
Placing	Team / Rider name	Total	1	2	3	4	5	6	7	8	9	10	11	12	13	14	15	16	17	18	19	20	21	22	23	24	25

M - exclusion for exceeding two minute time allowance • T - exclusion for touching the tapes • X - other exclusion • E - retired or mechanical failure • F - fell

Helmet colours were permanent for each team (red, blue, white and yellow/black). Colours in tables show gate positions:
gate A – inside	gate B	gate C	gate D – outside

=== Heat after heat ===
Extended content
1. Kasprzak, Andersen, Sullivan, Richardsson
2. Hampel, Crump, Bjerre, Stead
3. Gollob, Iversen, Holder, Kennett
4. Holta, N.Pedersen, Adams, Harris
5. Watt, B.Pedersen, Nicholls, Walasek
6. N.Pedersen, Holder, Richardsson, Walasek
7. Kasprzak, Adams, B.Pedersen, Stead
8. Hampel, Andersen, Watt, Kennett
9. Gollob, Bjerre, Sullivan, Harris
10. Iversen, Holta, Nicholls, Crump(joker)-t
11. Hampel, Iversen, Adams, Richardsson-e3
12. Gollob, N.Pedersen, Stead, Watt
13. B.Pedersen, Holta, Sullivan, Kennett
14. Crump, Andersen, Harris, Baliński-Fx
15. Bjerre, Kasprzak, Nicholls, Holder
16. Crump, B.Pedersen, Richardsson, Gollob
17. Andersen, Holta, Nicholls(joker), Schlein
18. Bjerre, Baliński, Adams, Allen
19. Kasprzak, Harris, Iversen, Watt
20. N.Pedersen, Hampel, Sullivan, Nicholls
21. Holta, Richardsson, Bjerre, Watt
22. Sullivan, Baliński, Iversen, Stead
23. Kasprzak, N.Pedersen, Crump, Allen-e4
24. B.Pedersen, Hampel, Schlein, Harris
25. Gollob, Nicholls, Andersen, Adams

== Final classification ==
Pos.	National team	Pts.
Gold	Poland	55
Silver	Denmark	52
Bronze	Australia	29
4	Great Britain	15
5	Sweden	40
6	Russia	7
7	United States	20
8	Finland	11

== See also ==
- 2007 Speedway Grand Prix
- 2007 Team Speedway Junior World Championship
