= 2017 Speedway World Cup final =

2017 FIM Speedway World Cup Final
Information
- Date: 8 July 2017
- City: Leszno
- Event: 4 of 4

Stadium details
- Stadium: Alfred Smoczyk Stadium
- Capacity: 25,000
- Length: 330 m
- Track: speedway track

SWC Results
Winner		Poland - 50 pts
Runner-up		Sweden - 42 pts
3rd place		Russia - 18 pts
4th place		Great Britain - 15 pts

The 2017 Monster Energy FIM Speedway World Cup Final was the final of the 2017 edition of the Speedway World Cup. It was staged on 8 July at the Alfred Smoczyk Stadium in Leszno, Poland. It was won by Poland, the eighth time they had done so since the World Cup was launched in 2001. They beat Sweden by eight points, while Russia finished third with Great Britain in fourth.

Captain Maciej Janowski was top scorer for Poland, with teammates Bartosz Zmarzlik, Piotr Pawlicki Jr. and Patryk Dudek also all scoring double figures. Antonio Lindbäck lead Sweden to second place, scoring 20 points.

== Results ==
=== Final ===
Pos.	National team	Pts.
1	Poland	50
2	Sweden	42
3	Russia	18
4	Great Britain	15

=== Scores ===
(Poland)	POLAND	50
No	Rider Name	Pts.	Heats
1	Patryk Dudek	10	3,3,2,2,0
2	Maciej Janowski	14	3,3,2,3,3
3	Piotr Pawlicki Jr.	13	2,3,2,3,3
4	Bartosz Zmarzlik	13	2,3,2,3,3
5	Bartosz Smektala	0

(Sweden)	SWEDEN	42
No	Rider Name	Pts.	Heats
1	Antonio Lindbäck	20	3,2,6,3,3,3
2	Fredrik Lindgren	11	3,2,3,2,1
3	Linus Sundström	4	1,1,2,0
4	Andreas Jonsson	7	2,2,0,1,2
5	Joel Kling	0

(Russia)	RUSSIA	18
No	Rider Name	Pts.	Heats
1	Emil Sayfutdinov	11	2,1,3,2,1,2
2	Grigory Laguta	DNR
3	Vadim Tarasenko	3	1,0,0,0,2
4	Andrey Kudriashov	1	0,0,0,1
5	Gleb Chugunov	3	0,1,1,10

(United Kingdom)	GREAT BRITAIN	15
No	Rider Name	Pts.	Heats
1	Steve Worrall	6	0,1,1,2,0,2
2	Chris Harris	7	1,2,1,2,0,1
3	Robert Lambert	1	0,0,0,1
4	Craig Cook	1	1,0,0,0
5	Adam Ellis	0

== See also ==
- 2016 Speedway Grand Prix
