= 2015 Speedway World Cup final =

2015 FIM Speedway World Cup Final
Information
- Date: 14 June 2015
- City: Vojens
- Event: 4 of 4
- Referee: Christian Froshauer

Stadium details
- Stadium: Vojens Speedway Center
- Capacity: 22,000
- Length: 300 m
- Track: speedway track

SWC Results
Winner		Sweden - 34 pts
Runner-up		Denmark - 32 pts
3rd place		Poland - 27 pts
4th place		Australia - 26 pts

The 2015 Monster Energy FIM Speedway World Cup Final was the last and final race of the 2015 edition of the Speedway World Cup. It was staged on June 14 at the Vojens Speedway Center in Vojens, Denmark, after the initial staging on June 13 was abandoned due to heavy rain. It was won by Sweden, the first time they have achieved success since 2004. They beat hosts and defending champions Denmark by two points, while Poland edged out Australia to claim third.

Sweden were led to success by captain Andreas Jonsson and the returning Fredrik Lindgren, while Antonio Lindbäck and Linus Sundström also contributed vital points. With just two heats remaining it looked likely that Denmark would retain their title as they held a four-point lead over the Swedes. Kenneth Bjerre suffered an engine failure in heat 19 though, while Lindgren went on to win the heat and reduce the gap to a single point. Danish captain Niels-Kristian Iversen was then excluded from the final heat, and Jonsson won the re-run to secure a two-point victory for Sweden.

== Results ==
Pos.	National team	Pts.
1	Sweden	34
2	Denmark	32
3	Poland	27
4	Australia	26

== Scores ==
(Sweden)	SWEDEN	34
No	Rider Name	Pts.	Heats
1	Antonio Lindbäck	7	0,2,3,0,2
2	Andreas Jonsson	12	3,3,1,2,3
3	Linus Sundström	4	0,X,2,1,1
4	Fredrik Lindgren	11	3,2,1,2,3

(Denmark)	DENMARK	32
No	Rider Name	Pts.	Heats
1	Peter Kildemand	13	3,1,3,3,3
2	Nicki Pedersen	4	0,X,1,1,2
3	Niels-Kristian Iversen	9	2,3,3,1,X
4	Kenneth Bjerre	6	3,1,0,2,E

(Poland)	POLAND	27
No	Rider Name	Pts.	Heats
1	Bartosz Zmarzlik	3	1,0,1,1,0
2	Krzysztof Buczkowski	4	1,1,2,0
3	Maciej Janowski	11	1,3,2,3,X,2
4	Przemysław Pawlicki	9	2,3,2,0,2

(Australia)	AUSTRALIA	26
No	Rider Name	Pts.	Heats
1	Chris Holder	8	0,2,3,X,2,1
2	Jason Doyle	8	1,0,E,3,3,1
3	Nick Morris	2	2,0,0
4	Troy Batchelor	8	2,2,0,3,1

== See also ==
- 2015 Speedway Grand Prix
