= 2009 Speedway World Cup final =

FIM Tobet Speedway World Cup Final
Information
- Date: 19 July 2009
- City: Leszno
- Event: 4 of 4 (39)
- Referee: Istvan Darago
- Jury President: Armando Castagna

Stadium details
- Stadium: Alfred Smoczyk Stadium
- Length: 330 m
- Track: speedway track

SWC Results
| Winner | | Poland - 44 pts |
| Runner-up | | Australia - 43 pts |
| 3rd place | | Sweden - 36 pts |
| 4th place | | Russia - 35 pts |

The FIM Tobet Speedway World Cup Final was the fourth meeting of the 2009 Speedway World Cup tournament. It took place on 19 July 2009 in the Alfred Smoczyk Stadium in Leszno, Poland.

== Results ==
| Pos. | National team | Pts. |
|---|---|---|
| Gold | Poland | 44 |
| Silver | Australia | 43 |
| Bronze | Sweden | 36 |
| 4 | Russia | 35 |

== Heat details ==
| Placing | Team / Rider Name | Total | 1 | 2 | 3 | 4 | 5 | 6 | 7 | 8 | 9 | 10 | 11 | 12 | 13 | 14 | 15 | 16 | 17 | 18 | 19 | 20 | 21 | 22 | 23 | 24 | 25 |
| 1 | Poland | 44 | 3 | 4 | 7 | 8 | 8 | 11 | 13 | 16 | 17 | 19 | 19 | 20 | 21 | 21 | 23 | 23 | 26 | 26 | 28 | 31 | 32 | 34 | 38 | 41 | 44 |
| 1 | (1) Krzysztof Kasprzak | 10 | 3 | | | | | | | | 1 | | | | 1 | | | | | | | 3 | | 2 |
| 1 | (2) Piotr Protasiewicz | 3 | | 1 | | | | | | | | 2 | | | | F4x | | 0 | | | | | | | - |
| 1 | (3) Jarosław Hampel | 18 | | | 3 | | | 3 | | | | | | | | | 2 | | 3 | | | | | | 4J | 3 |
| 1 | (4) Tomasz Gollob (c) | 6 | | | | 1 | | | 2 | | | | 0 | | | | | | | 0 | | | | | | | 3 |
| 1 | (5) Adrian Miedziński | 7 | | | | | X | | | 3 | | | | 1 | | | | | | | 2 | | 1 |
| 2 | Australia | 43 | 2 | 2 | 4 | 6 | 8 | 10 | 11 | 12 | 15 | 18 | 19 | 22 | 25 | 27 | 27 | 29 | 29 | 32 | 33 | 35 | 37 | 40 | 41 | 41 | 43 |
| 2 | (1) Davey Watt | 5 | 2 | | | | | | 1 | | | | | | | | 0 | | | | 1 | | | | 1 |
| 2 | (2) Troy Batchelor | 4 | | 0 | | | | | | 1 | | | 1 | | | | | | | | | 2 | | | | 0 |
| 2 | (3) Leigh Adams (c) | 12 | | | 2 | | | | | | 3 | | | 3 | | | | 2 | | | | | | | | | 2 |
| 2 | (4) Chris Holder | 10 | | | | 2 | | | | | | 3 | | | 3 | | | | 0 | | | | 2 |
| 2 | (5) Jason Crump | 12 | | | | | 2 | 2 | | | | | | | | 2 | | | | 3 | | | | 3 |
| Placing | Team / Rider Name | Total | 1 | 2 | 3 | 4 | 5 | 6 | 7 | 8 | 9 | 10 | 11 | 12 | 13 | 14 | 15 | 16 | 17 | 18 | 19 | 20 | 21 | 22 | 23 | 24 | 25 |
| 3 | Sweden | 36 | 0 | 3 | 4 | 7 | 10 | 11 | 14 | 16 | 16 | 16 | 18 | 20 | 20 | 21 | 22 | 23 | 24 | 25 | 31 | 32 | 32 | 32 | 35 | 36 | 36 |
| 3 | (1) Jonas Davidsson | 4 | 0 | | | | | 1 | | | | | 2 | | | | | 1 | | | | | 0 |
| 3 | (2) Fredrik Lindgren | 9 | | 3 | | | | | 3 | | | | | 2 | | | | | 1 | | | | | 0 |
| 3 | (3) Antonio Lindbäck | 7 | | | 1 | | | | | 2 | | | | | 0 | | | | | 1 | | | | | 3 |
| 3 | (4) Andreas Jonsson (c) | 11 | | | | 3 | | | | | 0 | | | | | 1 | | | | | 6J | | | | | 1 |
| 3 | (5) David Ruud | 5 | | | | | 3 | | | | | 0 | | | | | 1 | | | | | 1 | | | | | 0 |
| 4 | Russia | 35 | 1 | 3 | 3 | 3 | 4 | 4 | 4 | 4 | 6 | 7 | 13 | 13 | 15 | 18 | 21 | 24 | 26 | 28 | 28 | 28 | 31 | 32 | 32 | 34 | 35 |
| 4 | (1) Renat Gafurov | 7 | 1 | | | | | | | 0 | | | | | | 3 | | | 2 | | | | | | 0 | | 1 |
| 4 | (2) Emil Sayfutdinov | 18 | | 2 | | | | | | | 2 | | 6J | | | | 3 | | | 2 | | | 3 |
| 4 | (3) Roman Povazhny | 1 | | | 0 | | | | | | | 1 | - | | | | | | | | 0 | | | - |
| 4 | (4) Denis Gizatullin (c) | 0 | | | | 0 | | 0 | | | | | | F3 | | | | | | | | Fx | | | - |
| 4 | (5) Grigory Laguta | 9 | | | | | 1 | | X | | | | | | 2 | | | 3 | | | | | | 1 | | 2 |
| Placing | Team / Rider Name | Total | 1 | 2 | 3 | 4 | 5 | 6 | 7 | 8 | 9 | 10 | 11 | 12 | 13 | 14 | 15 | 16 | 17 | 18 | 19 | 20 | 21 | 22 | 23 | 24 | 25 |

M - exclusion for exceeding two minute time allowance • T - exclusion for touching the tapes • X - other exclusion • E - retired or mechanical failure • F - fell

Helmet colours was permanent for each teams (Red, Blue, White and Yellow/Black). Colours in diagrams means gate positions:
| gate A – inside | gate B | gate C | gate D – outside |

== See also ==
- 2009 Speedway World Cup
- motorcycle speedway
