= 2009 Australian Individual Speedway Championship =

Australian motorcycle speedway championship

Seasons
- ← 2008 2010 →

The 2009 Individual Speedway Australian Championship was the 2009 version of the Individual Speedway Australian Championship organised by Motorcycling Australia. The three final rounds took place between 3 January and 10 January. The championship was won by Leigh Adams, who beat the defending champion Chris Holder into second place. Rory Schlein finished third.

By winning the 2009 Australian Solo Championship, Leigh Adams won his record 10th Australian title, which he had first won in 1992. Adams was undefeated through the three rounds held at the Newcastle Showgrounds, Olympic Park Speedway, and Gillman Speedway.

== Qualification ==
- Qualification
- 2 January, 2009
- (New South Wales) Gosford, NSW - Gosford Speedway
- Referee:
- Qualification: the top six riders and two track reserves.

Pos.	Rider	Points	Details
1	(4) Kozza Smith	14	(3,3,3,2,3)
2	(13) Aaron Summers	13	(3,3,1,3,3)
3	(7) Darcy Ward	12	(3,3,3,2,1)
4	(16) Jay Herne	11	(2,2,3,1,3)
5	(8) Justin Sedgmen	11	(2,1,3,2,3)
6	(3) Lee Herne	10	(2,2,2,3,1)
7	(15) James Holder	9	(1,0,3,3,2)
8	(2) Hugh Skidmore	8	(1,3,1,1,2)
9	(9) Sam Masters	7	(3,2,1,1,0)
10	(14) Arlo Bugeja	6	(0,2,0,2,2)
11	(11) Richard Sweetman	6	(2,1,2,0,1)
12	(10) Michael Penfold	5	(1,1,0,2,1)
13	(6) Ryan Sedgmen	2	(e,0,0,0,2)
14	(12) Mitchell Davey	2	(e,0,2,0,0)
15	(5) Jake Anderson	2	(0,0,1,1,0)
16	(1) Kurt Shields	2	(1,1,e,0,0)

== Finals ==
Ten riders were seeded through to the finals:

- Leigh Adams
- Troy Batchelor
- Jason Doyle
- Cory Gathercole
- Josh Grajczonek
- Chris Holder
- Tyron Proctor
- Rory Schlein
- Davey Watt
- Cameron Woodward

=== Newcastle ===
- Round one
- 3 January, 2009
- (New South Wales) Newcastle, NSW - Newcastle Showgrounds
- Referee:

Placing	Rider	Total	1	2	3	4	5	6	7	8	9	10	11	12	13	14	15	16	17	18	19	20	Pts	Pos	21	22
1	(5) Leigh Adams	20		3			3					3					3					3	15	1		3
2	(10) Rory Schlein	18			3			3						3			0		3				12	2		2
3	(16) Chris Holder	17				3				2	3						2			1			11	5	3	1
4	(7) Jason Doyle	16		2					3					2	3					2			12	3		0
5	(9) Cameron Woodward	15			1		1						3					3		3			11	4	2	
6	(1) Tyron Proctor	14	3				2				0				0				2				7	7	1	
7	(11) Davey Watt	13			2				2		2					2						2	10	6	0	
8	(3) Cory Gathercole	12	1						0				2				1				3		7	8		
9	(13) Jay Herne	11				E	0							1		3					2		6	9		
10	(12) Troy Batchelor	10			0					3		2			1						E		6	10		
11	(14) Lee Herne	9				2		1					0		2							1	6	11		
12	(2) Kozza Smith	7	2					2				1				Fx				0			5	12		
13	(6) Darcy Ward	6		1				0			1							2			1		5	13		
14	(15) Josh Grajczonek	4				1			1			0						1	1				4	14		
15	(8) Justin Sedgmen	3		0						1			1			1			0				3	15		
16	(4) Aaron Summers	2	0							0				0				0				0	0	16		
	(17) James Holder	0																					0			
	(18) Hugh Skidmore	0																					0			
Placing	Rider	Total	1	2	3	4	5	6	7	8	9	10	11	12	13	14	15	16	17	18	19	20	Pts	Pos	21	22

m - exclusion for exceeding two minute time allowance • t - exclusion for touching the tapes • x - other exclusion • e - retired or mechanical failure • f - fell • ns - non-starter • nc - non-classify

gate A - inside	gate B	gate C	gate D - outside

=== Mildura ===
- Round two
- 7 January, 2009
- (Victoria (state)) Mildura, Victoria - Olympic Park Speedway
- Referee:

Placing	Rider	Total	1	2	3	4	5	6	7	8	9	10	11	12	13	14	15	16	17	18	19	20	Pts	Pos	21	22
1	(4) Leigh Adams	20	3							3				3				3				3	15	1		3
2	(1) Chris Holder	18	1				2				3				2				3				11	5	3	2
3	(3) Troy Batchelor	17	2						2				3				2				3		12	2		1
4	(6) Jason Doyle	16		3				3			2							2			2		12	3		Fx
5	(10) Rory Schlein	15			3			1						2			3		2				11	6	2	
6	(7) Davey Watt	14		2					3					0	3					3			11	4	1	
7	(13) Cameron Woodward	13				3	3							1		3					0		10	7	Fx	
8	(2) Tyron Proctor	12	0					2				3				2				1			8	8		
9	(16) Darcy Ward	11				2				2	1						1			2			8	9		
10	(8) Kozza Smith	10		1						1			2			1			1				6	10		
11	(9) Justin Sedgmen	9			2		1						0					1		0			4	11		
12	(14) Josh Grajczonek	7				0		0					1		0							2	3	12		
13	(5) Jay Herne	6		0			Fx					2					e					1	3	13		
14	(15) Aaron Summers	4				1			1			1						0	0				3	14		
15	(12) Lee Herne	3			0					0		0			1						1		2	15		
16	(11) Cory Gathercole	2			1				0		0					0						Fx	1	16		
Placing	Rider	Total	1	2	3	4	5	6	7	8	9	10	11	12	13	14	15	16	17	18	19	20	Pts	Pos	21	22

m - exclusion for exceeding two minute time allowance • t - exclusion for touching the tapes • x - other exclusion • e - retired or mechanical failure • f - fell • ns - non-starter • nc - non-classify

gate A - inside	gate B	gate C	gate D - outside

=== Gillman ===
- Round three
- 10 January, 2009
- Gillman, South Australia - Gillman Speedway
- Referee:

Placing	Rider	Total	1	2	3	4	5	6	7	8	9	10	11	12	13	14	15	16	17	18	19	20	Pts	Pos	21	22
1	(16) Leigh Adams	20				3				3	3						3			3			15	1		3
2	(6) Troy Batchelor	18		1				2			2							2			3		10	5-6	3	2
3	(9) Chris Holder	17			3		2						3					3		2			13	2		1
4	(1) Davey Watt	16	2				3				1				3				3				12	3		0
5	(3) Rory Schlein	15	3						2				2				2				2		11	5-6	2	
6	(5) Darcy Ward	14		3			1					3					1					3	11	4	1	
7	(10) Cameron Woodward	13			2			3						3			0		1				9	7	0	
8	(7) Cory Gathercole	12		2					3					1	2					1			9	8		
9	(13) Tyron Proctor	11				Fx	0							2		3					1		6	9		
10	(2) Kozza Smith	10	1					0				2				2				0			5	10		
11	(11) Aaron Summers	9			1				1		0					1						2	5	11		
12	(14) Josh Grajczonek	7				2		1					0		1							1	5	12		
13	(15) Justin Sedgmen	6				1			0			1						1	2				5	13		
14	(8) James Holder	4		0						2			1			0			0				3	14		
15	(12) Jay Herne	3			0					1		Fx			0						-		1	15		
16	(4) Lee Herne	2	0							0				0				Fx				0	0	16		
17	(17) Arlo Bugeja	0																			0		0	17		
Placing	Rider	Total	1	2	3	4	5	6	7	8	9	10	11	12	13	14	15	16	17	18	19	20	Pts	Pos	21	22

m - exclusion for exceeding two minute time allowance • t - exclusion for touching the tapes • x - other exclusion • e - retired or mechanical failure • f - fell • ns - non-starter • nc - non-classify

gate A - inside	gate B	gate C	gate D - outside

=== The intermediate classification ===
Pos.	Rider	Points	NEW	MIL	GIL
Gold	Leigh Adams	60	20	20	20
Silver	Chris Holder	52	17	18	17
Bronze	Rory Schlein	48	18	15	15
4	Troy Batchelor	45	10	17	18
5	Davey Watt	43	13	14	16
6	Cameron Woodward	41	15	13	13
7	Tyron Proctor	37	14	12	11
8	Jason Doyle	32	16	16	-
9	Darcy Ward	34	6	11	14
10	Cory Gathercole	28	12	4	12
11	Kozza Smith	27	7	10	10
12	Josh Grajczonek	20	4	9	7
13	Jay Herne	17	11	3	3
14	Aaron Summers	17	2	6	9
15	Justin Sedgmen	16	3	7	6
16	Lee Herne	13	9	2	2
17	James Holder	3			3
18	Arlo Bugeja	0			0

== See also ==
- Australian Individual Speedway Championship
- Australia national speedway team
- Sports in Australia
