= 2010 Speedway World Cup Event 2 =

2010 FIM Speedway World Cup – Event 2
Information
- Date: 26 July 2010
- City: King's Lynn
- Event: 2 of 4 (41)
- Referee: Christian Froschauer
- Jury President: Andrzej Grodzki

Stadium details
- Stadium: Norfolk Arena
- Length: 342 m
- Track: speedway track

SWC Results
- Best Time: (Australia) Chris Holder; 59.94 secs (in Heat 1)
Winner		Great Britain - 51 pts
Runner-up		Australia - 48 pts
3rd place		Sweden - 40 pts
4th place		Finland - 14 pts

The 2010 FIM PGE Polska Grupa Energetyczna Speedway World Cup Event 1 was the second race of the 2010 Speedway World Cup season. It took place on 26 July 2010 at the Norfolk Arena in King's Lynn, England.

== Results ==
The event was won by host team Great Britain who scored 51 points. Australia (48 points, without injury former three-time World Champion Jason Crump, former captain Leigh Adams, Ryan Sullivan) and Sweden (40 points, without injury star Andreas Jonsson) goes into the Race-off. Finland (14 points) were knocked out of the competition, but were classified 7th place in World Cup, beating Czech Republic (8 points in Event 1).

It was the Speedway World Cup debut for three riders: Darcy Ward of Australia (8 pts), Magnus Zetterström of Sweden (5 pts) and Timo Lahti of Finland (0 pts).

Pos.	National team	Pts.
1	Great Britain	51
2	Australia	48
3	Sweden	40
4	Finland	14

== Heat details ==
Placing	Team / Rider Name	Total	1	2	3	4	5	6	7	8	9	10	11	12	13	14	15	16	17	18	19	20	21	22	23	24	25
1	Great Britain	51	2	3	5	8	11	13	16	19	21	21	23	24	27	30	32	33	36	38	41	42	45	45	45	48	51
1	(1) Scott Nicholls	14	2							3						3			3								3
1	(2) Lee Richardson	10		1							2						2			2			3
1	(3) Tai Woffinden	7			2							F2x	2								3			0
1	(4) Simon Stead	7				3		2						1								1			Fx
1	(5) Chris Harris (c)	13					3		3						3			1								3
2	Australia	48	3	6	9	11	13	16	18	20	21	21	24	27	28	29	32	34	36	37	39	41	42	43	45	46	48
2	(1) Chris Holder	12	3						2								3				2				2
2	(2) Davey Watt (c)	11		3						2			3									2				1
2	(3) Troy Batchelor	11			3						1			3				2									2
2	(4) Rory Schlein	6				2						F3			1				2				1
2	(5) Darcy Ward	8					2	3								1				1				1
Placing	Team / Rider Name	Total	1	2	3	4	5	6	7	8	9	10	11	12	13	14	15	16	17	18	19	20	21	22	23	24	25
3	Sweden	40	0	2	3	3	4	5	5	5	11	14	15	15	17	19	20	23	24	27	28	31	31	34	37	39	40
3	(1) Fredrik Lindgren	14	Fx								6J				2							3		3
3	(2) Jonas Davidsson	14		2								3				2		3			1				3
3	(3) Antonio Lindbäck	6			1			1									1		1							2
3	(4) Magnus Zetterström (c)	5				0			0				1							3			0				1
3	(5) Daniel Nermark	1					1			0				Fx							-		-
4	Finland	14	0	0	0	1	1	1	2	3	3	5	5	7	7	7	7	7	7	7	7	7	11	13	14	14	14
4	(1) Timo Lahti	0	Fx					0					0					0					-
4	(2) Joonas Kylmäkorpi	9		0					1					2					0				4J	2
4	(3) Juha Hautamäki	2			0					1					0					0					1
4	(4) Kauko Nieminen (c)	1				1					0					0					0					0
4	(5) Tero Aarnio	2					0					2					0					0					0
Placing	Team / Rider Name	Total	1	2	3	4	5	6	7	8	9	10	11	12	13	14	15	16	17	18	19	20	21	22	23	24	25

M - exclusion for exceeding two minute time allowance • T - exclusion for touching the tapes • X - other exclusion • E - retired or mechanical failure • F - fell

Helmet colours was permanent for each teams (Red, Blue, White and Yellow/Black). Colours in diagrams means gate positions:
gate A – inside	gate B	gate C	gate D – outside

=== Heat after heat ===
1. [59.94] Holder, Nicholls, Lahti (Fx), Lindgren (Fx)
2. [60.03] Watt, Davidsson, Richardson, Kylmäkorpi
3. [60.19] Batchelor, Woffinden, Lindbäck, Hautamäki
4. [60.53] Stead, Schlein, Nieminen, Zetterström
5. [59.22] Harris, Ward, Nermark, Aarnio
6. [60.37] Ward, Stead, Lindbäck, Lahti
7. [60.00] Harris, Holder, Kylmäkorpi, Zetterström
8. [60.59] Nicholls, Watt, Hautamäki, Nermark
9. [60.28] Lindgren (J), Richardson, Batchelor, Nieminen
10. [60.60] Davidsson, Aarnio, Schlein (F), Woffinden (Fx)
11. [61.47] Watt, Woffinden, Zetterström, Lahti
12. [61.25] Batchelor, Kylmäkorpi, Stead, Nermark (Fx)
13. [60.90] Harris, Lindgren, Schlein, Hautamäki
14. [61.47] Nicholls, Davidsson, Ward, Nieminen
15. [61.82] Holder, Richardson, Lindbäck, Aarnio
16. [61.66] Davidsson, Batchelor, Harris, Lahti
17. [61.72] Nicholls, Schlein, Lindbäck, Kylmäkorpi
18. [62.34] Zetterström, Richardson, Ward, Hautamäki
19. [62.22] Woffinden, Holder, Davidsson, Nieminen
20. [61.53] Lindgren, Watt, Stead, Aarnio
21. [63.22] Richardson, Kylmäkorpi (J), Schlein, Zetterström
22. [62.37] Lindgren, Kylmäkorpi, Ward, Woffinden
23. [62.50] Davidsson, Holder, Hautamäki, Stead (Fx)
24. [61.31] Harris, Lindbäck, Watt, Nieminen
25. [62.78] Nicholls, Batchelor, Zetterström, Aarnio

== See also ==
- 2010 Speedway World Cup
- motorcycle speedway
