= 2004 Australian Under-21 Individual Speedway Championship =

Seasons
- ← 2003 2005 →

The 2004 Australian Under-21 Individual Speedway Championship was the 18th running of the Australian Under-21 Individual Speedway Championship organised by Motorcycling Australia. The final took place on 31 January 2004 at the Undera Park Speedway in Undera, Victoria. The championship was won by defending champion, Adelaide's Rory Schlein. Robert Ksiezak from Adelaide was second with another South Australian, Matt Wethers, in third place.

== 2004 Australian Under-21 Solo Championship ==
=== Intermediate Classification ===
- 31 January 2004
- (Victoria (state)) Undera, Victoria – Undera Park Speedway
- Referee:

Pos.	Rider	Points	Details
Gold	Rory Schlein ( (South Australia) )	15	(3,3,3,3,3)
Silver	Robert Ksiezak ( (South Australia) )	12	(2,3,3,3,1)
Bronze	Matt Wethers ( (South Australia) )	12	(3,2,2,2,3)
4	Trevor Harding ( (Western Australia) )	11+3	(2,2,3,2,2+3)
5	Mark Jones ( (Victoria (state)) )	11+2	(x,3,3,3,2+2)
6	Cameron Woodward ( (Victoria (state)) )	8	(3,1,2,2,x)
7	James Holder ( (New South Wales) )	8	(2,1,1,1,3)
8	Cory Gathercole ( (Victoria (state)) )	8	(1,3,1,2,1)
9	Tyron Proctor ( (Victoria (state)) )	7	(0,2,2,1,2)
10	Michael Slade ( (New South Wales) )	7	(1,2,1,1,2)
11	Arlo Bugeja ( (South Australia) )	6	(2,0,1,0,3)
12	John Oliver ( (Queensland) )	5	(nc,f,2,3,f)
13	Chris Holder ( (New South Wales) )	4	(3,0,0,0,1)
14	Brock Gates ( (Victoria (state)) )	3	(1,1,0,1,0)
15	Louis Myers ( (New South Wales) )	2	(1,1,f,f,ns)
16	Sam Dore ( (Victoria (state)) )	0	(nc,f,0,0,0)
17	Matt Windsor ( (Victoria (state)) ) (Res)	0	(-,-,-,-,nc)
18	Paul Boganowicz ( (Victoria (state)) ) (Res)	0	Did not ride

=== Final ===
1 Rory Schlein ( (South Australia) )
2 Robert Ksiezak ( (South Australia) )
3 Matt Wethers ( (South Australia) )
4 Trevor Harding ( (Western Australia) )

=== Heat By Heat ===
Placing	Rider	Total	1	2	3	4	5	6	7	8	9	10	11	12	13	14	15	16	17	18	19	20	Pts	Pos
1	(South Australia) (5) Rory Schlein	15		3			3					3					3					3	15	1
2	(South Australia) (4) Robert Ksiezak	12	2							3				3				3				1	12	2
3	(South Australia) (1) Matt Wethers	12	3				2				2				2				3				12	3
4	(Western Australia) (8) Trevor Harding	11+3		2						2			3			2			2				11	4
5	(Victoria (state)) (11) Mark Jones	11+2			x				3		3					3						2	11	5
6	(Victoria (state)) (9) Cameron Woodward	8			3		1						2					2		x			8	6
7	(New South Wales) (12) James Holder	8			2					1		1			1						3		8	7
8	(Victoria (state)) (10) Cory Gathercole	8			1			3						1			2		1				8	8
9	(Victoria (state)) (2) Tyron Proctor	7	0					2				2				1				2			7	9
10	(New South Wales) (3) Michael Slade	7	1						2				1				1				2		7	10
11	(South Australia) (16) Arlo Bugeja	6				2				0	1						0			3			6	11
12	(Queensland) (7) John Oliver	5		nc					f					2	3					f			5	12
13	(New South Wales) (13) Chris Holder	4				3	0							0		0					1		4	13
14	(Victoria (state)) (15) Brock Gates	3				1			1			0						1	0				3	14
15	(New South Wales) (6) Louis Myers	2		1				1			f							f			ns		2	15
16	(Victoria (state)) (14) Sam Dore	0				nc		f					0		0							0	0	16
	(Victoria (state)) (17) Matt Windsor	0																			0		0	
	(Victoria (state)) (18) Paul Boganowicz	0																					0	
Placing	Rider	Total	1	2	3	4	5	6	7	8	9	10	11	12	13	14	15	16	17	18	19	20	Pts	Pos

m - exclusion for exceeding two minute time allowance • t - exclusion for touching the tapes • x - other exclusion • e - retired or mechanical failure • f - fell • ns - non-starter • nc - non-classify

gate A - inside	gate B	gate C	gate D - outside

== See also ==
- Australia national speedway team
- Sport in Australia
