= Edward Jancarz Memorial =

Annual speedway event in Poland

The Edward Jancarz Memorial (Polish: Memoriał im. Edwarda Jancarza) is an annual speedway event held each year organized by the Stal Gorzów Wlkp. The Memorial held in the Edward Jancarz Stadium in Gorzów Wielkopolski. Memorial is irregular and first staged in 1992, when Edward Jancarz was murdered.

== Podium ==
=== Individual ===
Year	Winners	Runner-up	3rd place
1992 details	(Denmark) Hans Nielsen (14 pts); Motor Lublin	(Poland) Jarosław Szymkowiak (12+3 pts); Morawski Zielona Góra	(Czech Republic) Bohumil Brhel (12+2 pts); Stal Gorzów Wielkopolski
1993 details	(United Kingdom) Gary Havelock (12 pts); Stal Gorzów Wielkopolski	(Poland) Piotr Świst (11+3 pts); Stal Gorzów Wielkopolski	(Czech Republic) Antonín Kasper, Jr. (11+2 pts); Start Gniezno
1994 details	(United Kingdom) Joe Screen (13+3 pts); Włókniarz Częstochowa	(United States) Greg Hancock (13+2 pts); Unia Leszno	(United States) Billy Hamill (11+3 pts); Stal Gorzów Wielkopolski
1996 details	(Australia) Leigh Adams (13 pts); Unia Leszno	(Sweden) Tony Rickardsson (12 pts); Unia Tarnów	(Poland) Marek Hućko (11 pts); Stal Gorzów Wielkopolski
1997 details	(Denmark) Hans Nielsen (15 pts); Polonia Piła	(Sweden) Tony Rickardsson (14 pts); Stal Gorzów Wielkopolski	(Poland) Sławomir Drabik (9+3 pts); Włókniarz Częstochowa
1998 details	(Poland) Tomasz Gollob (14 pts + 1st); Polonia Bydgoszcz	(Poland) Roman Jankowski (12 pts + 2nd); Unia Leszno	(Australia) Leigh Adams (12 pts + 3rd); Unia Leszno
1999 details	(Poland) Tomasz Gollob (13 pts + 1st); Polonia Bydgoszcz	(Poland) Robert Sawina (11 pts + 2nd); Start Gniezno	(Denmark) Hans Nielsen (13 pts +3rd); Polonia Piła
2001 details	(Norway) Rune Holta (13 pts + 1st); Włókniarz Częstochowa	(Sweden) Andreas Jonsson (10 pts + 2nd); Apator Toruń	(Poland) Robert Sawina (10 pts + 3rd); Atlas Wrocław
2005 details	(Australia) Jason Crump (11 pts + 1st); Apator Toruń	(Poland) Rune Holta (15 pts + 2nd); Włókniarz Częstochowa	(Australia) Leigh Adams (12 pts + 3rd); Unia Leszno
2007 details	(Australia) Jason Crump (11 pts + 1st); Atlas Wrocław	(United Kingdom) Chris Harris (11 pts + 2nd); RKM Rybnik	(Australia) Leigh Adams (14 pts + 3rd); Unia Leszno
2008 details	(Australia) Jason Crump (13 pts + 1st); Atlas Wrocław	(Denmark) Nicki Pedersen (15 pts + 2nd); Włókniarz Częstochowa	(Poland) Krzysztof Kasprzak (11 pts + 3rd); Unia Leszno
Year	Winners	2nd place	3rd place

=== Pairs ===
Year	Winners	Runner-up	3rd place
2009 details	(Poland) Rune Holta (Sweden) Thomas H. Jonasson; Caelum Stal Gorzów	(Denmark) Nicki Pedersen; Włókniarz Częstochowa (Poland) Paweł Zmarzlik; Caelum Stal Gorzów	(Poland) Jarosław Hampel (Poland) Przemysław Pawlicki; Unia Leszno

== See also ==
- motorcycle speedway
