= 2010 Australian Individual Speedway Championship =

Australian motorcycle speedway championship

The 2010 Australian Individual Speedway Championship was a motorcycle speedway competition organised by Motorcycling Australia (MA) for the Australian Individual Speedway Championship. The event was held over four rounds.

Chris Holder won his second championship.

== Rounds ==
Round	Date	Venue	Winner
1	2 January	Gillman Speedway, Adelaide	Troy Batchelor
2	3 January	Olympic Park, Mildura	Troy Batchelor
3	9 January	Newcastle Showgrounds, Newcastle	Chris Holder

== Final classification ==
Pos.	Rider	Total
Gold	Chris Holder	56
Silver	Troy Batchelor	55
Bronze	Darcy Ward	51
4	Rory Schlein	48
5	Cory Gathercole	52
6	Ty Proctor	38
7	Jason Doyle	36
8	Justin Sedgmen	36
9	Cameron Woodward	34
10	Sam Masters	30
11	Josh Auty	26
12	Alex Davies	22
13	Mark Lemon	21
14	Robert Ksiezak	15
15	Josh Grajczonek	9
16	James Holder	8
17	Joe Haines	7

== See also ==
- Australian Individual Speedway Championship
- Australia national speedway team
- Sports in Australia
