= 1997 Edward Jancarz Memorial =

Seasons
- ← 1996 1998 →

The 5th Edward Jancarz Memorial was the 1997 version of the Edward Jancarz Memorial. It took place on 3 August in the Stal Gorzów Stadium in Gorzów Wielkopolski, Poland. The Memorial was won by Hans Nielsen who beat Tony Rickardsson and Sławomir Drabik.

== Heat details ==
- 3 August 1997 (Sunday)
- Best Time: 63.49 - Tony Rickardsson in Heat 5
- Attendance:
- Referee: Lechosław Bartnicki

Placing	Rider	Total	1	2	3	4	5	6	7	8	9	10	11	12	13	14	15	16	17	18	19	20	Pts	Pos	21
1	(Denmark) (4) Hans Nielsen (PIŁ)	15	3							3				3				3				3	15	1	
2	(Sweden) (5) Tony Rickardsson (GOR)	14		3			3					3					3					2	14	2	
3	(Poland) (10) Sławomir Drabik (CZE)	9			3			2						2			F		2				9	3	3
4	(Poland) (11) Piotr Świst (GOR)	9			2				2		2					2						1	9	5	2
5	(Denmark) (9) Brian Andersen (RZE)	9			1		2						1					2		3			9	4	1
6	(Poland) (8) Andrzej Huszcza (ZIE)	8		0						2			2			1			3				8	6	
7	(Poland) (1) Roman Jankowski (LES)	8	2				F				3				2				1				8	7	
8	(Poland) (6) Tomasz Bajerski (GOR)	7		1				3			R							T/-			3		7	8	
9	(Sweden) (2) Peter Karlsson (PIŁ)	7	1					1				0				3				2			7	9	
10	(Australia) (7) Todd Wiltshire (GDA)	7		2					1					0	3					1			7	10	
11	(Czech Republic) (14) Antonín Kasper, Jr. (RZE)	6				3		0					3		0							0	6	11	
12	(Poland) (3) Jacek Krzyżaniak (TOR)	6	0						3				0				1				2		6	12	
13	(United Kingdom) (16) Chris Louis (ZIE)	5				1				1	1						2			R			5	13	
14	(United Kingdom) (12) Andy Smith (TAR)	4			0					0		2			1						1		4	14	
15	(Poland) (15) Piotr Paluch (GOR)	4				2			0			1						1	F				4	15	
16	(Poland) (13) Mirosław Kowalik (TOR)	1				0	1							T/-		0					-		1	16	
	(Poland) (R1) Mariusz Staszewski (GOR)	1												1							0		1		
	(Poland) (R2) Krzysztof Cegielski (GOR)	0																0					0		
Placing	Rider	Total	1	2	3	4	5	6	7	8	9	10	11	12	13	14	15	16	17	18	19	20	Pts	Pos	21

m - exclusion for exceeding two minute time allowance • t - exclusion for touching the tapes • x - other exclusion • e - retired or mechanical failure • f - fell • ns - non-starter • nc - non-classify

gate A - inside	gate B	gate C	gate D - outside

=== Heat after heat ===
1. (63.70) Nielsen, Jankowski, Karlsson, Krzyżaniak
2. (63.66) Rickardsson, Wiltshire, Bajerski, Huszcza
3. (63.77) Drabik, Świst, Andersen, Smith
4. (63.72) Kasper, Paluch, Louis, Kowalik
5. (63.49) Rickardsson, Andersen, Kowalik, Jankowski (F)
6. (64.07) Bajerski, Drabik, Karlsson,
7. (64.25) Krzyżaniak, Świst, Wiltshire, Paluch
8. (64.01) Nielsen, Huszcza, Louis, Smith
9. (64.81) Jankowski, Świst, Louis, Bajerski (R)
10. (64.09) Rickardsson, Smith, Paluch, Karlsson
11. (64.36) Kasper, Huszcza, Andersen, Krzyżaniak
12. (63.86) Nielsen, Drabik, Staszewski, Wiltshire, Kowalik (T)
13. (64.81) Wiltshire, Jankowski, Smith, Kasper
14. (63.65) Karlsson, Świst, Huszcza, Kowalik
15. (63.55) Rickardsson, Louis, Krzyżaniak, Drabik (F)
16. (63.50) Nielsen, Andersen, Paluch, Cegielski, Bajerski (T)
17. (65.05) Huszcza, Drabik, Jankowski, Paluch (F)
18. (64.96) Andersen, Karlsson, Wiltshire, Louis (T)
19. (64.02) Bajerski, Krzyżaniak, Smith, Staszewski, Kowalik (-)
20. (63.51) Nielsen, Rickardsson, Świst, Kasper
  3rd-5th placed Run-Off
21. (64.66) Drabik, Świst, Andersen

== See also ==
- motorcycle speedway
- 1997 in sports
