= 2010 Speedway World Cup final =

Fourth and final race of Speedway World Cup season

2010 FIM Speedway World Cup – Final
Information
- Date: 1 August 2010
- City: Vojens
- Event: 4 of 4 (43)
- Referee: Craig Ackroyd
- Jury President: Wolfgang Glas

Stadium details
- Stadium: Speedway Center
- Length: 300 m
- Track: speedway track

SWC Results
- Sweden
- Poland
- Denmark
- Great Britain

The 2010 FIM PGE Polska Grupa Energetyczna Speedway World Cup Final was the fourth and the final race of the 2010 Speedway World Cup season. The event took place on August 1, 2010, at the Speedway Center in Vojens, Denmark.

The race was initially scheduled for July 31; it was cancelled after Heat 4, however, when the track was deemed unsuitable by the FIM Jury due to adverse weather conditions. The race was re-staged on the next day at 3pm.

== Results ==
Pos.	National team	Pts.
Gold	Poland	44
Silver	Denmark	39
Bronze	Sweden	35
4	Great Britain	33

== Heat details ==
=== Day 1 (canceled) ===
1. Holta, Lindgren, Harris, Bjerre
2. Davidsson, Hampel, Woffinden, Klindt
3. Lindbäck, Stead, Iversen, Gollob
4. Pedersen, Nicholls, Zetterström, Miedziński

Standings:

1. Sweden - 9 pts
2. Great Britain - 6 pts
3. Poland - 5 pts
4. Denmark - 4 pts

=== Day 2 ===
The declared teams for the event were announced after practice on July 30, 2010.

Placing	Team / Rider Name	Total	1	2	3	4	5	6	7	8	9	10	11	12	13	14	15	16	17	18	19	20	21	22	23	24	25
1	Poland	44	2	4	4	4	4	4	7	10	13	14	17	20	22	24	27	30	30	33	33	34	36	37	39	41	44
1	(1) Rune Holta	10	2						3								3				F				2
1	(2) Jarosław Hampel	11		2						3			3									1				2
1	(3) Tomasz Gollob (c)	12			F						3			3				3									3
1	(4) Adrian Miedziński	5				0						1			2				F				2
1	(5) Janusz Kołodziej	6					0	E								2				3				1
2	Denmark	39	3	4	6	9	10	13	15	17	18	18	20	20	21	22	23	25	28	30	33	35	36	38	39	39	39
2	(1) Kenneth Bjerre	9	3							2						1			3								0
2	(2) Nicolai Klindt	6		1							1						1			2			1
2	(3) Niels Kristian Iversen	9			2							F	2								3			2
2	(4) Bjarne Pedersen	9				3		3						0								2			1
2	(5) Hans N. Andersen (c)	6					1		2						1			2								0
Placing	Team / Rider Name	Total	1	2	3	4	5	6	7	8	9	10	11	12	13	14	15	16	17	18	19	20	21	22	23	24	25
3	Sweden	35	1	4	7	9	11	13	13	14	14	17	17	19	19	19	21	21	23	23	27	27	27	27	30	33	35
3	(1) Fredrik Lindgren	3	1					2					0					0					T
3	(2) Jonas Davidsson	7		3					0					2					2					0
3	(3) Antonio Lindbäck	10			3					1					0					0					3	3
3	(4) Magnus Zetterström (c)	2				2					0					0					-					-
3	(5) Andreas Jonsson	13					2					3					2				4J	0					2
4	Great Britain	33	0	0	1	2	5	6	7	7	9	11	12	13	16	19	19	20	20	21	22	25	28	31	31	32	33
4	(1) Chris Harris (c)	11	0								2				3				FJ			3		3
4	(2) Tai Woffinden	6		E								2				3		1							0
4	(3) Simon Stead	2			1			1									0		-							-
4	(4) Scott Nicholls	5				1			1				1							1							1
4	(5) Lee Richardson	8					3			0				1							1		3			1
Placing	Team / Rider Name	Total	1	2	3	4	5	6	7	8	9	10	11	12	13	14	15	16	17	18	19	20	21	22	23	24	25

M - exclusion for exceeding two minute time allowance • T - exclusion for touching the tapes • X - other exclusion • E - retired or mechanical failure • F - fell

Helmet colours was permanent for each teams (Red, Blue, White and Yellow/Black). Colours in diagrams means gate positions:
gate A – inside	gate B	gate C	gate D – outside

== See also ==
- 2010 Speedway World Cup
- motorcycle speedway
