= 2003 Australian Under-21 Individual Speedway Championship =

Seasons
- ← 2002 2004 →

The 2003 Australian Under-21 Individual Speedway Championship was the 17th running of the Australian Under-21 Individual Speedway Championship organised by Motorcycling Australia. The final was held at the Oakburn Park Speedway in Tamworth, New South Wales.

== 2003 Australian Under-21 Solo Championship ==
=== Intermediate Classification ===
- Tamworth, New South Wales - Oakburn Park Speedway
- Referee:

Pos.	Rider	Points	Details
1	Cameron Woodward ( (Victoria (state)) )	15	(3,3,3,3,3)
2	Rory Schlein ( (South Australia) )	12	(3,3,1,2,3)
3	Jaye Stevens ( (New South Wales) )	12	(2,2,3,3,2)
4	Scott James	12	(2,2,3,2,3)
5	Mark Jones ( (Victoria (state)) )	11	(2,3,2,3,1)
6	Jaye Herne ( (New South Wales) )	10	(3,0,2,2,3)
7	Michael Slade ( (New South Wales) )	9	(3,1,3,1,2)
8	Trevor Harding ( (Western Australia) )	8	(1,1,2,3,1)
9	Matt Wethers ( (South Australia) )	7	(2,2,0,2,1)
10	Karlis Ezergailis ( (Victoria (state)) )	6	(1,0,2,1,2)
11	Louis Myers ( (New South Wales) )	6	(1,3,1,1,0)
12	Arlo Bugeja ( (South Australia) )	3	(1,1,1,0,0)
13	Joel Parsons ( (New South Wales) )	3	(0,2,0,1,0)
14	Todd Groves	3	(0,1,0,0,2)
15	Perry Gunner Sutton	1	(0,0,0,0,1)
16	Paul Boganowicz ( (Victoria (state)) )	0	(0,0,1,ns,0)

=== Final ===
1 Rory Schlein ( (South Australia) )
2 Cameron Woodward ( (Victoria (state)) )
3 Jaye Stevens ( (New South Wales) )
4 Scott James

== See also ==
- Australia national speedway team
- Sport in Australia
