= 1998 Edward Jancarz Memorial =

Seasons
- ← 1997 1999 →

The 6th Edward Jancarz Memorial was the 1998 version of the Edward Jancarz Memorial. It took place on 16 May in the Stal Gorzów Stadium in Gorzów Wielkopolski, Poland. The Memorial was won by Tomasz Gollob who beat Roman Jankowski, Leigh Adams and Ryan Sullivan in the final.

== Heat details ==
- 16 May 1998 (Saturday)
- Best Time: 64.51 - Hans Nielsen in Heat 13
- Attendance:
- Referee: Marek Wojaczek

Placing	Rider	Total	1	2	3	4	5	6	7	8	9	10	11	12	13	14	15	16	17	18	19	20	Pts	Pos	21
1	(Poland) (2) Tomasz Gollob (BYD)	14	3					2				3				3				3			14	1	3
2	(Poland) (11) Roman Jankowski (LES)	12			3				2		3					1						3	12	2,3	2
3	(Australia) (3) Leigh Adams (LES)	12	2						1				3				3				3		12	2,3	1
4	(Australia) (7) Ryan Sullivan (TOR)	11		3					3					3	1					1			11	4	0
5	(Denmark) (12) Hans Nielsen (PIŁ)	11			2					3		1			3						2		11	5	
6	(United States) (16) Sam Ermolenko (GDA)	11				3				2	2						2			2			11	6	
7	(Poland) (15) Robert Flis (PIŁ)	8				0			0			2						3	3				8	7	
8	(Sweden) (13) Henrik Gustafsson (BYD)	8				2	2							2		2					R1		8	8	
9	(Poland) (14) Krzysztof Cegielski (GOR)	8				1		1					2		2							2	8	9	
10	(Poland) (6) Paweł Nizioł (GOR)	6		0				3			0							2			1		6	10	
11	(Poland) (8) Adam Fajfer (GNI)	5		1						1			1			0			2				5	11	
12	(Poland) (9) Waldemar Walczak (GOR)	3			0		3						0					X		0			3	12	
13	(Sweden) (5) Tony Rickardsson (GOR)	3		2			1					-					-					-	3	13	
14	(Poland) (1) Tomasz Bajerski (GOR)	3	1				0				1				0				1				3	14	
15	(Poland) (4) Grzegorz Walasek ()	2	0							F4				1				1				N	2	15	
16	(Poland) (10) Piotr Paluch (GOR)	2			1			R						0			1		0				2	16	
	(Poland) (R1) Dariusz Stenka (GOR)	1										0					0					1	1		
Placing	Rider	Total	1	2	3	4	5	6	7	8	9	10	11	12	13	14	15	16	17	18	19	20	Pts	Pos	21

m - exclusion for exceeding two minute time allowance • t - exclusion for touching the tapes • x - other exclusion • e - retired or mechanical failure • f - fell • ns - non-starter • nc - non-classify

gate A - inside	gate B	gate C	gate D - outside

=== Heat after heat ===
1. (65,97) Gollob, Adams, Bajerski, Walasek
2. (65,36) Sullivan, Rickardsson, Fajfer, Nizioł
3. (65,59) Jankowski, Nielsen, Paluch, Walczak
4. (65,84) Ermolenko, Gustafsson, Cegielski, Flis
5. (66,14) Walczak, Gustafsson, Rickardsson, Bajerski
6. (66,28) Nizioł, Gollob, Cegielski, Paluch (R/start)
7. (65,74) Sullivan, Jankowski, Adams, Flis
8. (66,05) Nielsen, Ermolenko, Fajfer, Walasek (F4)
9. (66,29) Jankowski, Ermolenko, Bajerski, Nizioł
10. (65,56) Gollob, Flis, Nielsen, Stenka, Rickardsson (-)
11. (66,42) Adams, Cegielski, Fajfer, Walczak
12. (64,80) Sullivan, Gustafsson, Walasek, Paluch
13. (64,51) Nielsen, Cegielski, Sullivan, Bajerski
14. (65,03) Gollob, Gustafsson, Jankowski, Fajfer
15. (65,40) Adams, Ermolenko, Paluch, Stenka, Rickardsson (-)
16. (66,78) Flis, Nizioł, Walasek, Walczak (X)
17. (69,79) Flis, Fajfer, Bajerski, Paluch
18. (69,77) Gollob, Ermolenko, Sullivan, Walczak
19. (70,31) Adams, Nielsen, Nizioł, Gustafsson (R1)
20. (70,71) Jankowski, Cegielski, Stenka, Rickardsson (-), Walasek (N)
  The Final (top four riders)
21. (?) T.Gollob, R.Jankowski, Adams, Sullivan

== See also ==
- motorcycle speedway
- 1998 in sports
