= 2007 Edward Jancarz Memorial =

Seasons
- ← 2005 2008 →

The 10th Edward Jancarz Memorial was the 2007 version of the Edward Jancarz Memorial. It took place on 16 June in the Stal Gorzów Stadium in Gorzów Wielkopolski, Poland. The Memorial was won by Jason Crump who beat Chris Harris, Leigh Adams and Andreas Jonsson in the final.

== Heat details ==
- 16 June 2007 (Saturday)
- Best Time: 63.91 - Leigh Adams in Heat 9
- Attendance:
- Referee: Ryszard Bryła

Placing	Rider	Total	1	2	3	4	5	6	7	8	9	10	11	12	13	14	15	16	17	18	19	20	Pts	Pos	21
1	(Australia) (1) Jason Crump (WRO)	11	3				3				2				3				R				11	2	3
2	(United Kingdom) (8) Chris Harris (RYB)	11		3						1			3			2			2				11	3	2
3	(Australia) (16) Leigh Adams (LES)	14				2				3	3						3			3			14	1	1
4	(Sweden) (14) Andreas Jonsson (BYD)	10				3		2					2		0							3	10	4	T
5	(Poland) (12) Krzysztof Kasprzak (LES)	9			3					0		3			2						1		9	5	
6	(Australia) (6) Ryan Sullivan (TOR)	8		0				1			1							3			3		8	6	
7	(Denmark) (15) Jesper B. Jensen (GOR)	8				1			1			1						2	3				8	7	
8	(Poland) (4) Rafał Dobrucki (RZE)	8	2							2				2				0				2	8	8	
9	(Slovenia) (7) Matej Ferjan (GOR)	7		2					0					3	1					1			7	9	
10	(Poland) (2) Jarosław Hampel (LES)	6	1					0				0				3				2			6	10	
11	(Sweden) (9) Antonio Lindbäck (CZE)	6			2		2						1					1		0			6	11	
12	(Poland) (5) Grzegorz Walasek (ZIE)	6		1			T/-					2					2					1	6	12	
13	(Poland) (11) Rafał Okoniewski (BYD)	5			1				3		0					1						0	5	13	
14	(Poland) (3) Sebastian Ułamek (CZE)	5	0						2				0				1				2		5	14	
15	(Sweden) (10) David Ruud (GOR)	4			0			3						0			0		1				4	15	
16	(Poland) (13) Piotr Świst (BYD)	2				0	1							1		0					0		2	16	
17	(Poland) (17) Kamil Brzozowski (GRU)	0					0																0	17	
	(Poland) (R2) Adrian Szewczykowski (GOR)	0																					0		
Placing	Rider	Total	1	2	3	4	5	6	7	8	9	10	11	12	13	14	15	16	17	18	19	20	Pts	Pos	21

m - exclusion for exceeding two minute time allowance • t - exclusion for touching the tapes • x - other exclusion • e - retired or mechanical failure • f - fell • ns - non-starter • nc - non-classify

gate A - inside	gate B	gate C	gate D - outside

Changes:

(14) Wiesław Jaguś (TOR) → Jonsson
(12) Fredrik Lindgren (ZIE) → Kasprzak
(5) Tomasz Gollob (TAR) → Walasek
(3) Rune Holta (TAR) → Ułamek

=== Heat after heat ===
1. Crump, Dobrucki, Hampel, Ułamek
2. Harris, Ferjan, Walasek, Sullivan
3. Kasprzak, Lindbaeck, Okoniewski, Ruud
4. Jonsson, Adams, Jensen, Świst
5. Crump, Lindbaeck, Świst, Brzozowski, Walasek (T/-)
6. Ruud, Jonsson, Sullivan, Hampel
7. Okoniewski, Ułamek, Jensen, Ferjan
8. Adams, Dobrucki, Harris, Kasprzak
9. Adams, Crump, Sullivan, Okoniewski
10. Kasprzak, Walasek, Jensen, Hampel
11. Harris, Jonsson, Lindbaeck, Ułamek
12. Ferjan, Dobrucki, Świst, Ruud
13. Crump, Kasprzak, Ferjan, Jonsson
14. Hampel, Harris, Okoniewski, Świst
15. Adams, Walasek, Ułamek, Ruud
16. Sullivan, Jensen, Lindbaeck, Dobrucki
17. Jensen, Harris, Ruud, Crump (d/start)
18. Adams, Hampel, Ferjan, Lindbaeck
19. Sullivan, Ułamek, Kasprzak, Świst
20. Jonsson, Dobrucki, Walasek, Okoniewski
  The Final (top four riders)
21. Crump, Harris, Adams, Jonsson (T)

== See also ==
- motorcycle speedway
- 2007 in sports
