= 1999 Edward Jancarz Memorial =

Seasons
- ← 1998 2001 →

The 7th Edward Jancarz Memorial was the 1999 version of the Edward Jancarz Memorial, an annual motorcycle speedway event. The event took place on 19 June in the Stal Gorzów Stadium in Gorzów Wielkopolski, Poland. The Memorial was won by Tomasz Gollob who beat Robert Sawina, Hans Nielsen and Sławomir Drabik in the final.

== Heat details ==
- 19 June 1999 (Saturday)
- Best Time: 64.92 - Tomasz Gollob in Heat 9
- Attendance: ?
- Referee: Stanisław Pieńkowski

Placing	Rider	Total	1	2	3	4	5	6	7	8	9	10	11	12	13	14	15	16	17	18	19	20	Pts	Pos	21
1	(Poland) (1) Tomasz Gollob (BYD)	13	3				3				3				3				1				13	1	3
2	(Poland) (7) Robert Sawina (GNI)	11		1					3					3	1					3			11	3	2
3	(Denmark) (14) Hans Nielsen (PIŁ)	13				3		3					2		2							3	13	2	1
4	(Poland) (6) Sławomir Drabik (CZE)	10		3				0			2							3			2		10	4	T
5	(United States) (8) Sam Ermolenko (ŁÓD)	10		2						1			3			1			3				10	5	
6	(Poland) (10) Rafał Okoniewski (GOR)	10			3			1						2			2		2				10	6	
7	(Poland) (11) Sebastian Ułamek (GDA)	9			2				2		1					2						2	9	7	
8	(Sweden) (13) Tony Rickardsson (GDA)	8				T/-	2							0		3					3		8	8	
9	(Poland) (12) Robert Dados (GRU)	8			1					3		3			0						1		8	9	
10	(Poland) (15) Tomasz Cieślewicz (GOR)	7				2			1			2						2	0				7	10	
11	(Hungary) (2) Zoltán Adorján (LUB)	6	2					2				0				0				2			6	11	
12	(Poland) (4) Piotr Paluch (GOR)	6	1							2				1				1				1	6	12	
13	(Poland) (5) Tomasz Bajerski (GOR)	4		0			0					1					3					0	4	13	
14	(Poland) (9) Adam Skórnicki (LES)	3			F		1						1					0		1			3	14	
15	(Czech Republic) (16) Antonín Kasper, Jr. (RZE)	2				1				R	0						1			0			2	15	
16	(Poland) (3) Tomasz Kwiatkowski (GOR)	0	R						0				0				0				0		0	16	
	(Poland) (R1) Maciej Jąder (LES)	0				F																	0		
Placing	Rider	Total	1	2	3	4	5	6	7	8	9	10	11	12	13	14	15	16	17	18	19	20	Pts	Pos	21

m - exclusion for exceeding two minute time allowance • t - exclusion for touching the tapes • x - other exclusion • e - retired or mechanical failure • f - fell • ns - non-starter • nc - non-classify

gate A - inside	gate B	gate C	gate D - outside

=== Heat after heat ===
1. (65,41) Gollob, Adorjan, Paluch, Kwiatkowski (R)
2. (66,21) Drabik, Ermolenko, Sawina, Bajerski
3. (66,06) Okoniewski, Ułamek, Dados, Skórnicki (F)
4. (66,29) Nielsen, Cieślewicz, Kasper, Jąder (F), Rickardsson (T/-)
5. (65,03) Gollob, Rickardsson, Skórnicki, Bajerski
6. (66,94) Nielsen, Adorjan, Okoniewski, Drabik
7. (67,12) Sawina, Ułamek, Cieślewicz, Kwiatkowski
8. (68,17) Dados, Paluch, Ermolenko, Kasper (R)
9. (64,92) Gollob, Drabik, Ułamek, Kasper
10. (67,16) Dados, Cieślewicz, Bajerski, Adorjan
11. (66,47) Ermolenko, Nielsen, Skórnicki, Kwiatkowski
12. (66,19) Sawina, Okoniewski, Paluch, Rickardsson
13. (67,57) Gollob, Nielsen, Sawina, Dados
14. (66,37) Rickardsson, Ułamek, Ermolenko, Adorjan
15. (67,12) Bajerski, Okoniewski, Kasper, Kwiatkowski
16. (67,65) Drabik, Cieślewicz, Paluch, Skórnicki
17. (68,64) Ermolenko, Okoniewski, Gollob, Cieślewicz
18. (68,25) Sawina, Adorjan, Skórnicki, Kasper
19. (66,75) Rickardsson, Drabik, Dados, Kwiatkowski
20. (67,46) Nielsen, Ułamek, Paluch, Bajerski
  The Final (top four riders)
21. (67,76) Gollob, Sawina, Nielsen, Drabik (T)

== See also ==
- motorcycle speedway
- 1999 in sports
