= 2009 Edward Jancarz Memorial =

Seasons
- ← 2008 2010 →

The 12th Edward Jancarz Memorial was the 2009 version of the Edward Jancarz Memorial. It took place on 9 August in the Stal Gorzów Stadium in Gorzów Wielkopolski, Poland. The Memorial was won by host pair Stal Gorzów Wielkopolski: Rune Holta and Thomas H. Jonasson.

== Heat details ==
- 9 August 2007 (Sunday)
- Best Time: 60.34 - Jarosław Hampel in Heat 3 (new track record)
- Attendance: 8,400
- Referee: Ryszard Bryła (Zielona Góra)

Placing	Pair / Rider Name	Total	1	2	3	4	5	6	7	8	9	10	11	12	13	14	15	16	17	18	19	20	21
1	Gorzów Wlkp.	23							10							17							23
1	(Poland) (1) Rune Holta #8	15+1	3			3				3			2				1*			3
1	(Sweden) (2) Thomas H. Jonasson	8+2	2*			2*				1			1				2			0
2	Częstochowa / Gorzów Wlkp.	21							5							12							21
2	(Denmark) (13) Nicki Pedersen #1	15				1			3			2				3			3		3
2	(Poland) (14) Paweł Zmarzlik	6+2				0			1			1*				1			2*		1
3	Leszno	20							6							12							20
3	(Poland) (9) Jarosław Hampel	16+1			3			3				3		2			3					2*
3	(Poland) (10) Przemysław Pawlicki	4+1			0			0				0		1*			0					3
4	Bydgoszcz / Toruń	19							6							14							19
4	(Sweden) (3) Andreas Jonsson #7	14+1	1				3				2*			3				3			2
4	(Czech Republic) (4) Matěj Kůs	5+1	0				2*				3			0				0			R
5	Częstochowa	18							8							11							18
5	(United States) (7) Greg Hancock #4	10+2		2*				1*			0					2				2			3
5	(United Kingdom) (8) Tai Woffinden	8+1		3				2			1					R				1*			1
5	Wrocław	18							5							13							18
5	(Australia) (11) Jason Crump #2	10+1			2				2				T/-		2*			2					2
5	(Poland) (12) Maciej Janowski	8+2			1*				0				3		3			1*					0
7	Gdańsk	5							2							4							5
7	(Poland) (5) Adam Skórnicki	3		0			0			2					0				1			0
7	(Poland) (6) Martin Vaculík	2		1			1			F/N					-				-			-
Placing	Pair / Rider Name	Total	1	2	3	4	5	6	7	8	9	10	11	12	13	14	15	16	17	18	19	20	21

m - exclusion for exceeding two minute time allowance • t - exclusion for touching the tapes • x - other exclusion • e - retired or mechanical failure • f - fell
ns - non-starter • nc - non-classify

gate A - inside	gate B	gate C	gate D - outside

Notes:

# - there are a 2009 Speedway Grand Prix jacket numbers.
Holta (Norway) and Vaculík (Slovakia) started with Polish speedway licence.

=== Heat after heat ===
1. Holta, Jonasson, Jonsson, Kus
2. Woffinden, Hancock, Vaculik, Skórnicki
3. Hampel, Crump, Janowski, Pawlicki
4. Holta, Jonasson, Pedersen, Zmarzlik
5. Jonsson, Kus, Vaculik, Skórnicki
6. Hampel, Woffinden, Hancock, Pawlicki
7. Pedersen, Crump, Zmarzlik, Janowski
8. Holta, Skórnicki, Jonasson, Vaculik (F/N)
9. Kus, Jonsson, Woffinden, Hancock
10. Hampel, Pedersen, Zmarzlik, Pawlicki
11. Janowski, Holta, Jonasson, Szewczykowski (Crump T)
12. Jonsson, Hampel, Pawlicki, Kus
13. Janowski, Crump, Szewczykowski, Skórnicki
14. Pedersen, Hancock, Zmarzlik, Woffinden (R4)
15. Hampel, Jonasson, Holta, Pawlicki
16. Jonsson, Crump, Janowski, Kus
17. Pedersen, Zmarzlik, Skórnicki, Szewczykowski
18. Holta, Hancock, Woffinden, Jonasson
19. Pedersen, Jonsson, Zmarzlik, Kus (R4)
20. Pawlicki, Hampel, Szewczykowski, Skórnicki
21. Hancock, Crump, Woffinden, Janowski

== See also ==
- motorcycle speedway
- 2009 in sports
