= 1996 Edward Jancarz Memorial =

Seasons
- ← 1994 1997 →

The 4th Edward Jancarz Memorial was the 1996 version of the Edward Jancarz Memorial. It took place on 12 May in the Stal Gorzów Stadium in Gorzów Wielkopolski, Poland. The Memorial was won by Leigh Adams who beat Tony Rickardsson and Marek Hućko.

== Heat details ==
- 12 May 1996 (Friday)
- Best Time: 64.35 - Marek Hućko in Heat 1
- Attendance: ?
- Referee: Roman Siwiak

Placing	Rider	Total	1	2	3	4	5	6	7	8	9	10	11	12	13	14	15	16	17	18	19	20	Pts	Pos
1	(Australia) (11) Leigh Adams (LES)	13			3				3		2					3						2	13	1
2	(Sweden) (4) Tony Rickardsson (TAR)	12	2							3				1				3				3	12	2
3	(Poland) (1) Marek Hućko (GOR)	11	3				2				3				1				2				11	3
4	(Czech Republic) (6) Antonín Kasper, Jr. (GNI)	10		3				3			1							Fx			3		10	4
5	(Poland) (5) Piotr Świst (GOR)	10		R2			3					3					3					1	10	5
6	(Poland) (14) Tomasz Gollob (BYD)	10				3		2					2		3							0	10	6
7	(Poland) (15) Tomasz Bajerski (TOR)	9				2			0			2						2	3				9	7
8	(Australia) (8) Jason Lyons (GOR)	8		2						1			3			1			1				8	8
9	(Russia) (7) Rif Saitgariejew (OST)	8		1					1					2	2					2			8	9
10	(Poland) (2) Jacek Gollob (BYD)	7	Fx					1				1				2				3			7	10
11	(Poland) (13) Mariusz Staszewski (GOR)	5				1	1							3		F4					0		5	11
12	(Poland) (12) Sylwester Moskwiak (GOR)	5			1					2		0			0						2		5	12
13	(Poland) (3) Piotr Baron (WRO)	5	1						2				1				0				1		5	13
14	(Australia) (9) Mark Lemon (RYB)	4			2		0						0					1		1			4	14
15	(Austria) (16) Andreas Bössner (RAW)	2				0				0	0						2			R4			2	15
16	(Poland) (10) Ryszard Franczyszyn (GOR)	0			0			0						0			-		-				0	16
	(Poland) (R1) Robert Flis (GOR)	0																	0				0	
	(Poland) (R2) Piotr Paluch (GOR)	1															1						1	
Placing	Rider	Total	1	2	3	4	5	6	7	8	9	10	11	12	13	14	15	16	17	18	19	20	Pts	Pos

m - exclusion for exceeding two minute time allowance • t - exclusion for touching the tapes • x - other exclusion • e - retired or mechanical failure • f - fell • ns - non-starter • nc - non-classify

gate A - inside	gate B	gate C	gate D - outside

=== Heat after heat ===
1. (64.35) Hućko, Rickardsson, Baron, J. Gollob (Fx)
2. (65.52) Kasper, Lyons, Saitgariejew, Świst (R2)
3. (65.44) Adams, Lemon, Moskwiak, Franczyszyn
4. (66.77) T. Gollob, Bajerski, Staszewski, Boessner
5. (65.23) Świst, Hućko, Staszewski, Lemon
6. (64.47) Kasper, T. Gollob, J. Gollob, Franczyszyn
7. (65.14) Adams, Baron, Saitgariejew, Bajerski
8. (66.35) Rickardsson, Moskwiak, Lyons, Boessner
9. (64.71) Hućko, Adams, Kasper, Boessner
10. (65.42) Świst, Bajerski, J. Gollob, Moskwiak
11. (66.36) Lyons, T. Gollob, Baron, Lemon
12. (66.03) Staszewski, Saitgariejew, Rickardsson, Franczyszyn
13. (66.31) T. Gollob, Saitgariejew, Hućko, Moskwiak
14. (66.79) Adams, J. Gollob, Lyons, Staszewski (F4)
15. (66.98) Świst, Boessner, Paluch, Baron, Franczyszyn (-)
16. (65.70) Rickardsson, Bajerski, Lemon, Kasper (Fx)
17. (66.43) Bajerski, Hućko, Lyons, Flis, Franczyszyn (-)
18. (67.34) J. Gollob, Saitgariejew, Lemon, Boessner (R4)
19. (66.69) Kasper, Moskwiak, Baron, Staszewski
20. (65.45) Rickardsson, Adams, Świst, T. Gollob

== See also ==
- motorcycle speedway
- 1996 in sports
