= 2001 Edward Jancarz Memorial =

Seasons
- ← 1999 2005 →

The 8th Edward Jancarz Memorial was the 2001 version of the Edward Jancarz Memorial. It took place on 15 July in the Stal Gorzów Stadium in Gorzów Wielkopolski, Poland. The Memorial was won by Rune Holta who beat Andreas Jonsson, Robert Sawina and Mariusz Staszewski in the final.

== Heat details ==
- 15 July 2001 (Sunday)
- Best time: 63.07 - Andreas Jonsson in heat 9
- Attendance:
- Referee: Józef Piekarski

Placing	Rider	Total	1	2	3	4	5	6	7	8	9	10	11	12	13	14	15	16	17	18	19	20	Pts	Pos	21
1	(Norway) (2) Rune Holta (CZE)	13	2					3				3				2				3			13	1	3
2	(Sweden) (6) Andreas Jonsson (TOR)	10		1				R3			3							3			3		10	3	2
3	(Poland) (3) Robert Sawina (WRO)	10	1						1				3				3				2		10	4	1
4	(Poland) (1) Mariusz Staszewski (GOR)	11	3				1				2				3				2				11	2	0
5	(Poland) (10) Piotr Paluch (GOR)	10			2			2						3			2		1				10	5	
6	(Denmark) (12) Jesper B. Jensen (GRU)	9			3					2		1			2						1		9	6	
7	(Poland) (15) Marek Hućko (ŁÓD)	8				3			3			0						2	0				8	7	
8	(Poland) (4) Tomasz Bajerski (TOR)	8	0							2				2				1				3	8	8	
9	(Poland) (5) Piotr Świst (GOR)	7		3			0					1					1					2	7	9	
10	(Poland) (7) Grzegorz Walasek (CZE)	7		2					2					F4	1					2			7	10	
11	(Poland) (8) Jacek Gollob (PIŁ)	6		R4						0			R			3			3				6	11	
12	(Poland) (9) Robert Dados (WRO)	6			1		2						2					0		1			6	12	
13	(Poland) (13) Tomasz Cieślewicz (GDA)	5				0	3							1		1					M		5	13	
14	(Poland) (16) Sławomir Drabik (PIŁ)	4				1				3	Fx						R4			0			4	14	
15	(Sweden) (14) Stefan Dannö (GOR)	4				2		1					1		0							0	4	15	
16	(Poland) (11) Michał Aszenberg (GOR)	1			0				0		1					R4						-	1	16	
	(Poland) (R1) Jakub Śpiewanek (GOR)	1																				1	1		
	(Poland) (R2) Marcin Dąbrowski (GOR)	0																					0		
Placing	Rider	Total	1	2	3	4	5	6	7	8	9	10	11	12	13	14	15	16	17	18	19	20	Pts	Pos	21

m - exclusion for exceeding two minute time allowance • t - exclusion for touching the tapes • x - other exclusion • e - retired or mechanical failure • f - fell • ns - non-starter • nc - non-classify

gate A - inside	gate B	gate C	gate D - outside

=== Heat after heat ===
1. (63,94) Staszewski, Holta, Sawina, Bajerski
2. (63,81) Świst, Walasek, Jonsson, Gollob (R4)
3. (63,81) Jensen, Paluch, Dados, Aszenberg
4. (64,31) Hućko, Danno, Drabik, Cieślewicz
5. (64,69) Cieślewicz, Dados, Staszewski, Świst
6. (63,46) Holta, Paluch, Danno, Jonsson (R3)
7. (64,50) Hućko, Walasek, Sawina, Aszenberg
8. (64,88) Drabik, Bajerski, Jensen, Gollob
9. (63,07) Jonsson, Staszewski, Aszenberg, Drabik (Fx)
10. (63,37) Holta, Jensen, Świst, Hućko
11. (64,97) Sawina, Dados, Danno, Gollob (R4)
12. (64,50) Paluch, Bajerski, Cieślewicz, Walasek (F4)
13. (64,81) Staszewski, Jensen, Walasek, Danno
14. (64,91) Gollob, Holta, Cieślewicz, Aszenberg (R4)
15. (64,22) Sawina, Paluch, Świst, Drabik (R4)
16. (64,60) Jonsson, Hućko, Bajerski, Dados
17. (65,50) Gollob, Staszewski, Paluch, Hućko
18. (64,06) Holta, Walasek, Dados, Drabik
19. (64,12) Jonsson, Sawina, Jensen, Cieślewicz (M)
20. (66,28) Bajerski, Świst, Śpiewanek, Danno, Aszenberg (-)
  The final (top four riders)
21. (63,31) Holta, Jonsson, Sawina, Staszewski

== See also ==
- motorcycle speedway
- 2001 in sports
