= 1992 Edward Jancarz Memorial =

Seasons
- ← none 1993 →

The 1st Edward Jancarz Memorial was the 1992 version of the Edward Jancarz Memorial, an annual speedway event. It took place on 12 July in the Stal Gorzów Stadium in Gorzów Wielkopolski, Poland. The Memorial was won by Hans Nielsen who beat Jarosław Szymkowiak and Bohumil Brhel.

== Heat details ==
- 12 July 1992 (Sunday)
- Best Time: 65.25 - Bohumil Brhel in Heat 1
- Attendance: ?
- Referee: Roman Siwiak

Placing	Rider	Total	1	2	3	4	5	6	7	8	9	10	11	12	13	14	15	16	17	18	19	20	Pts	Pos	21
1	(Denmark) (14) Hans Nielsen (LUB)	14				3		3					2		3							3	14	1	
2	(Poland) (13) Jarosław Szymkowiak (ZIE)	12				2	2							2		3					3		12	3	3
3	(Czech Republic) (4) Bohumil Brhel (GOR)	12	3							3				3				3				0	12	2	2
4	(Poland) (10) Piotr Świst (GOR)	11			3			1						1			3		3				11	4	
5	(Poland) (6) Andrzej Huszcza (ZIE)	10		1				2			3							2			2		10	5	
6	(Hungary) (1) Antal Kocso (GOR)	10	1				3				2				2				2				10	6	
7	(Hungary) (11) Zoltán Adorján (RZE)	10			2				3		1					2						2	10	7	
8	(Denmark) (7) Tommy Knudsen (WRO)	7		3					0					0	1					3			7	8	
9	(Poland) (3) Roman Jankowski (LES)	7	2						2				3				0				0		7	9	
10	(Poland) (12) Mirosław Kowalik (TOR)	6			0					2		3			0						1		6	10	
11	(Sweden) (16) Einar Kyllingstadt (GOR)	5				1				0	0						2			2			5	11	
12	(Poland) (8) Jacek Krzyżaniak (TOR)	5		2						1			0			1			1				5	12	
13	(Poland) (9) Jarosław Olszewski (GDA)	5			1		1						1					1		1			5	13	
14	(Poland) (5) Ryszard Franczyszyn (GOR)	4		0			0					2					1					1	4	14	
15	(Poland) (2) Sławomir Drabik (CZE)	1	0					0				1				0				0			1	15	
16	(Poland) (15) Piotr Paluch (GOR)	1				0			1			0						0	R				1	16	
Placing	Rider	Total	1	2	3	4	5	6	7	8	9	10	11	12	13	14	15	16	17	18	19	20	Pts	Pos	21

m - exclusion for exceeding two minute time allowance • t - exclusion for touching the tapes • x - other exclusion • e - retired or mechanical failure • f - fell • ns - non-starter • nc - non-classify

gate A - inside	gate B	gate C	gate D - outside

== See also ==
- motorcycle speedway
- 1992 in sports
