= Stadion im. Edwarda Jancarza =

Polish motorcycle speedway stadium

Jancarz
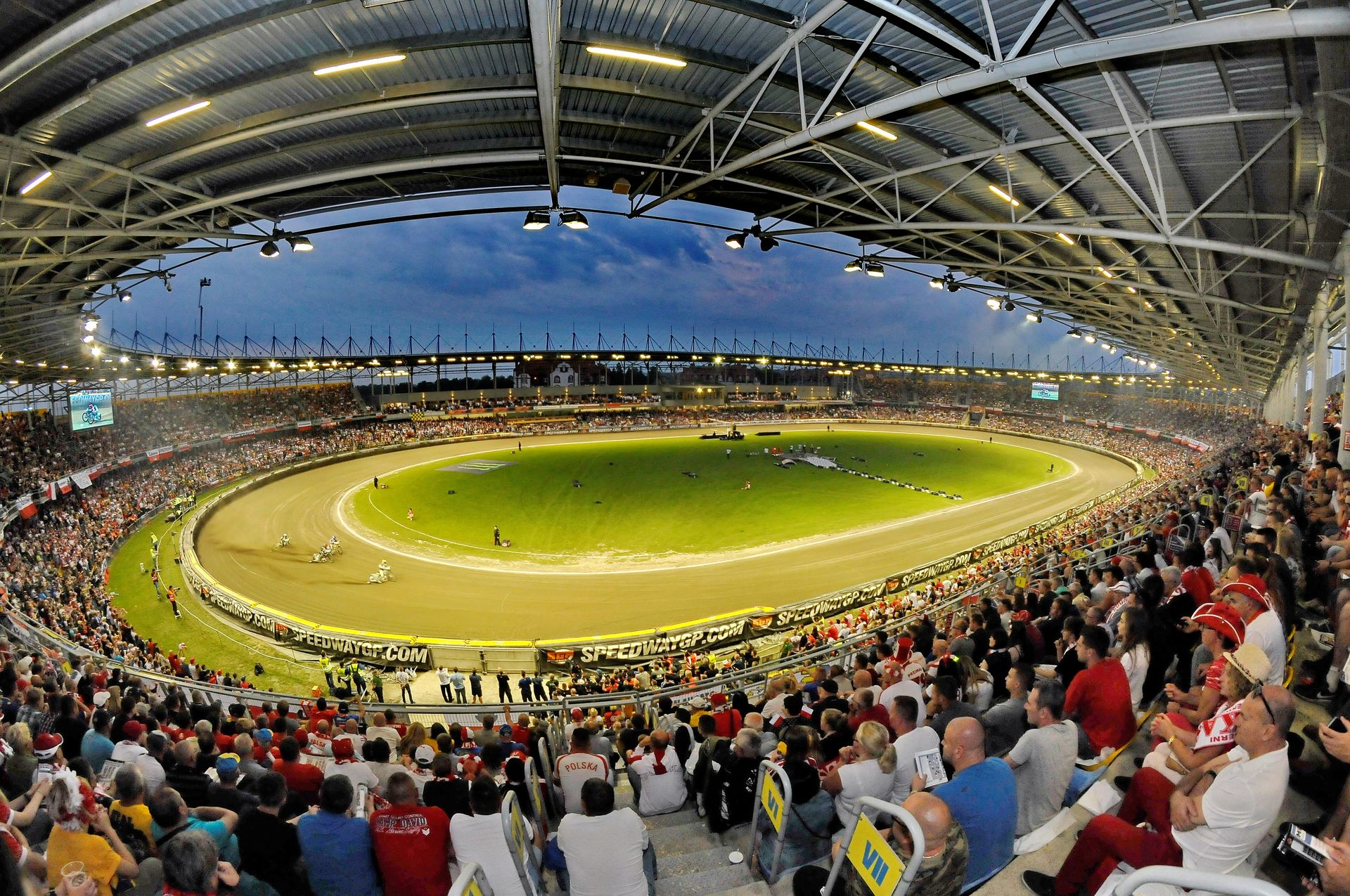
- Location: Gorzów Wielkopolski, Poland
- Coordinates: 52°43′15″N 15°13′41″E
- Owner: Gorzów Wielkopolski City
- Opened: 1951
- Length: 0.329 km

Edward Jancarz Stadium (Polish: Stadion im. Edwarda Jancarza), formerly the Stadion żużlowy Gorzów Wielkopolski, is a 15,000-capacity multi-use stadium in Gorzów Wielkopolski, Poland, and the home of motorcycle speedway club Stal Gorzów Wielkopolski. It is currently used mostly as a 329 m racetrack for speedway matches and is the home stadium of Stal Gorzów Wielkopolski in the Speedway Ekstraliga.

== History ==
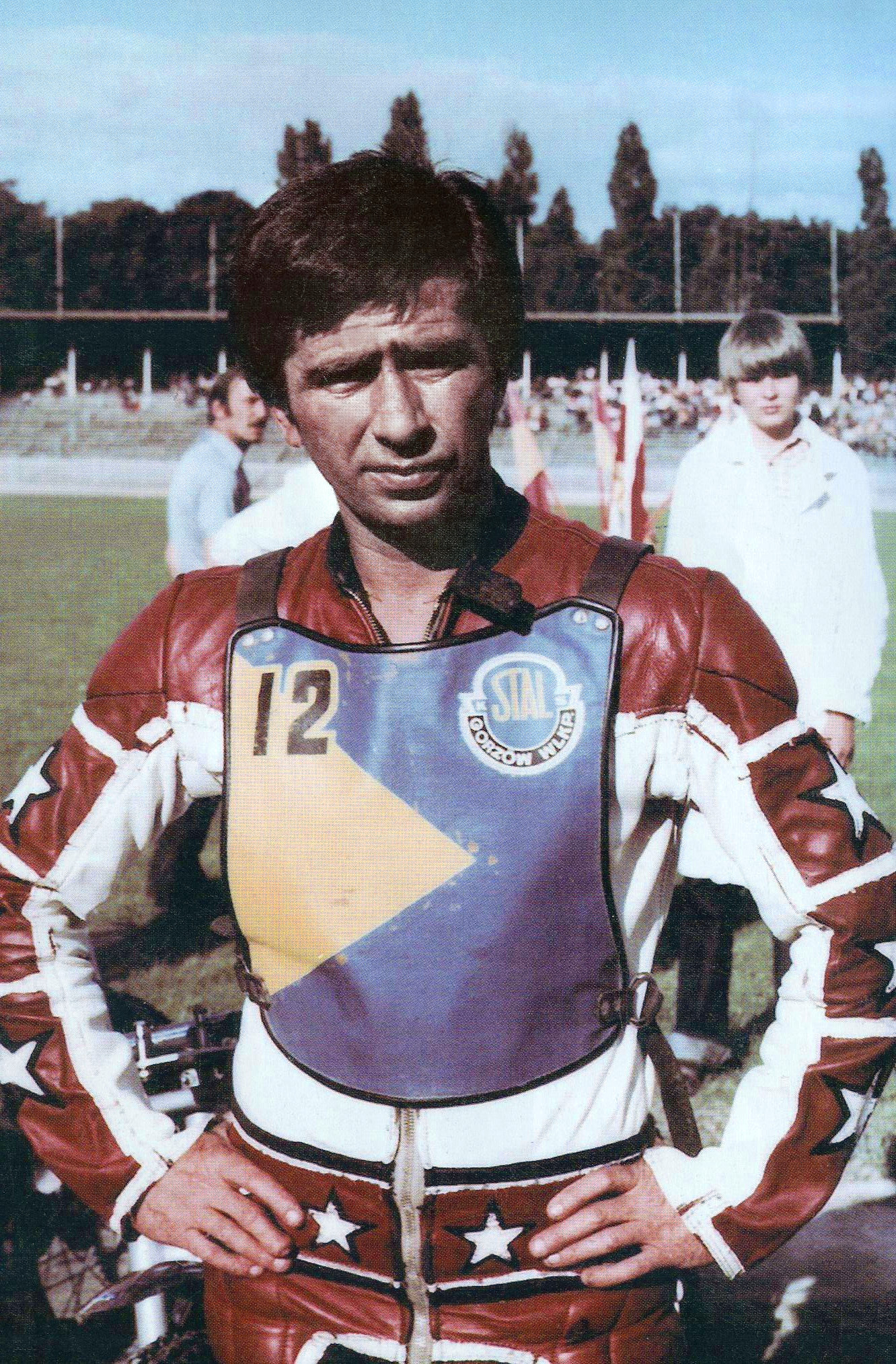
Edward Jancarz

The stadium has opened in 1951. It is named after Edward Jancarz, a former speedway rider from Gorzów Wielkopolski who finished third in the 1968 World Final in Sweden, and helped Poland win the 1969 Speedway World Team Cup at home in Rybnik. Jancarz was murdered by his wife in 1992.

=== Events hosted ===
==== International ====
- Speedway Grand Prix of Poland: 2011, 2012, 2013, 2014, 2015, 2016, 2017, 2018, 2020 (x2), 2022, 2023, 2024
- Speedway World Cup: 2010 (Event One), 2011 (Race-off and the Final)
- Individual Speedway Junior World Championship: 2000 Final
- Team Speedway Junior World Championship: 2009 Final

==== Polish Championships ====
- Individual Speedway Polish Championship Finals: 1970, 1974, 1976, 1977, 1978, 1979, 1984, 1985,
- Polish Pairs Speedway Championship Finals: 1982, 1992, 1998

== Gallery ==
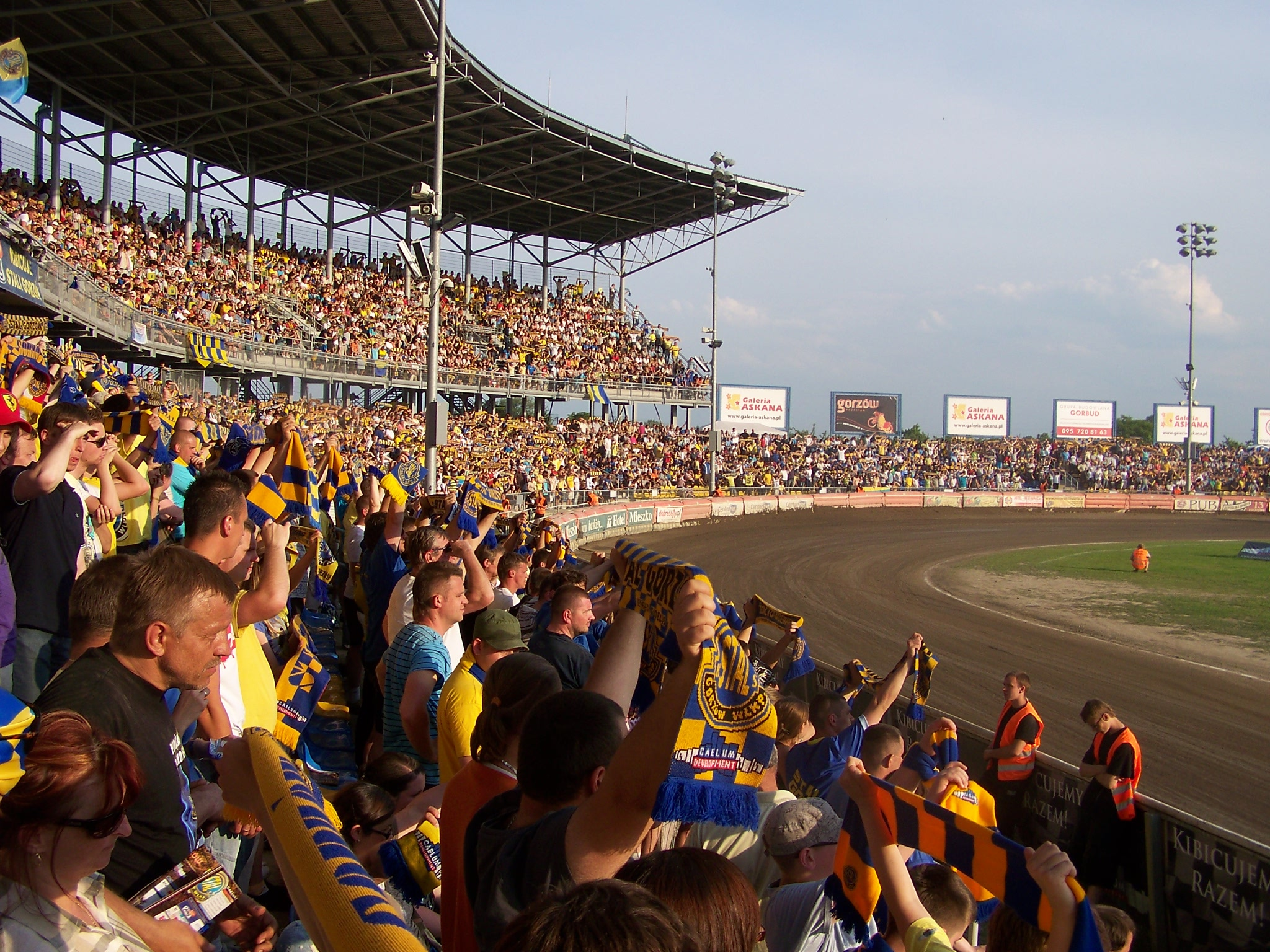
2010 Stal Gorzów versus Falubaz Zielona Góra

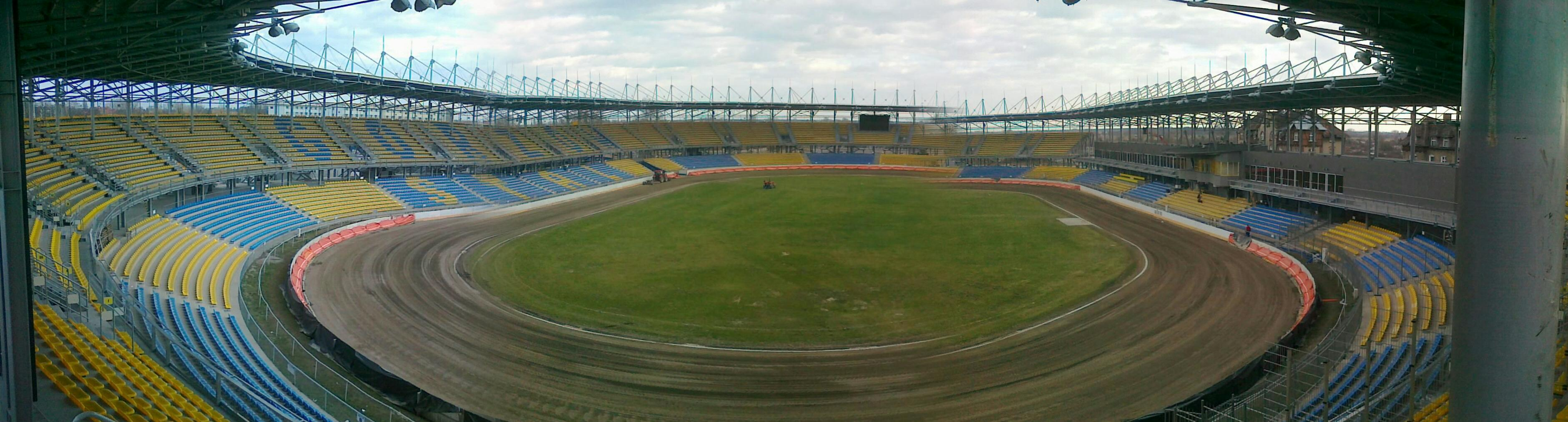
2011 Panorama

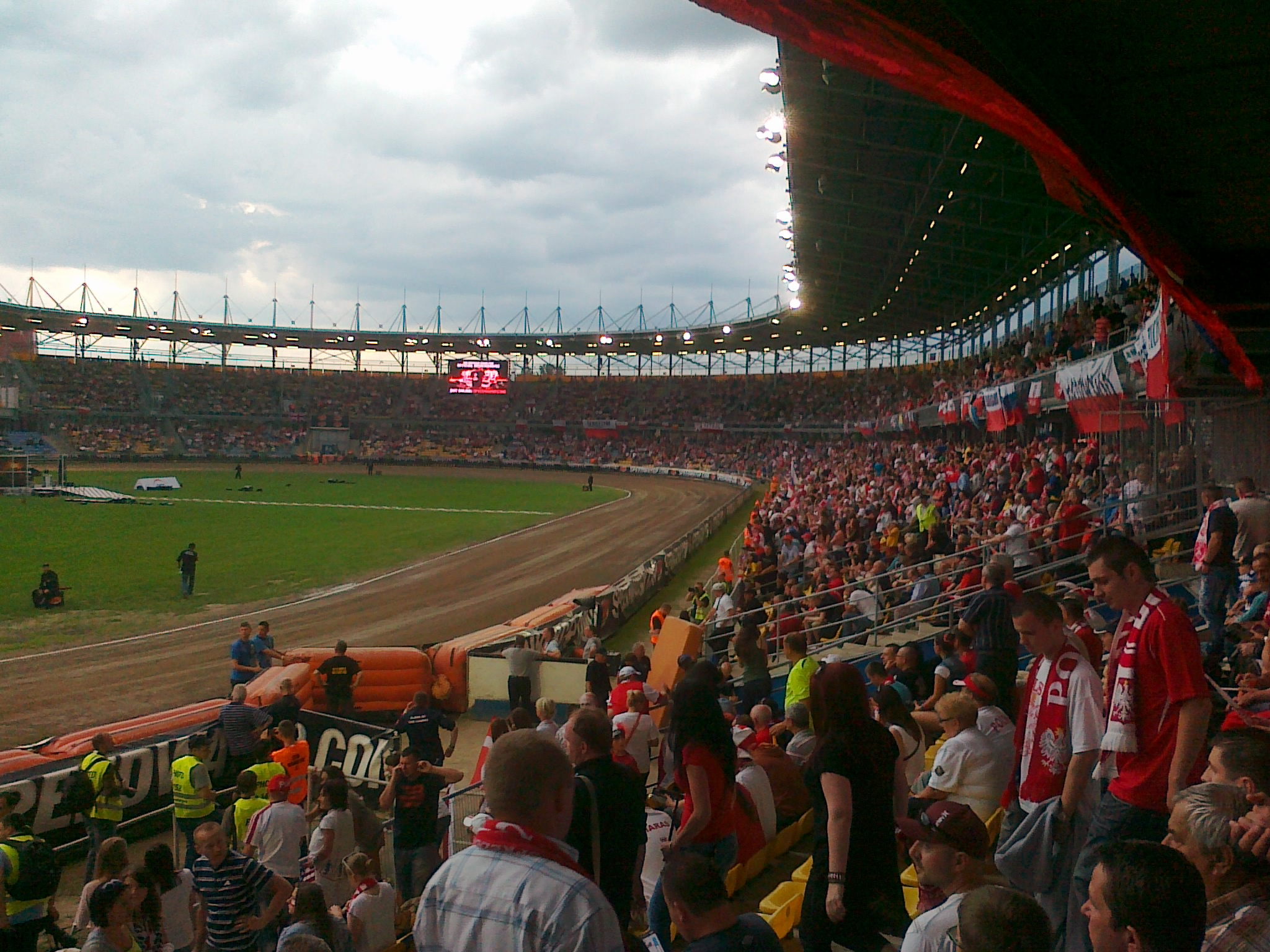
Polish Grand Prix in 2013

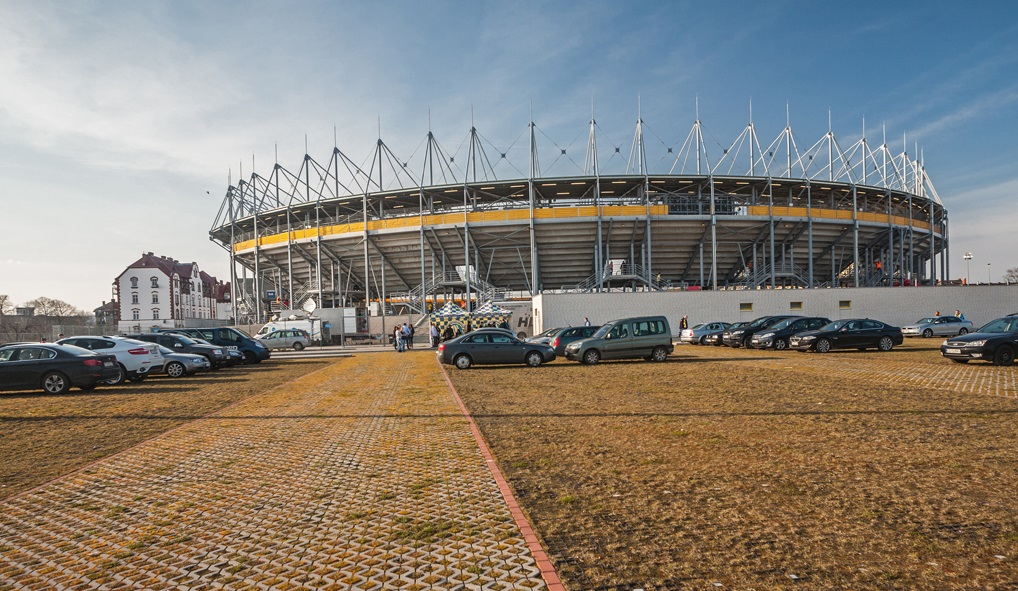
Exterior in 2013

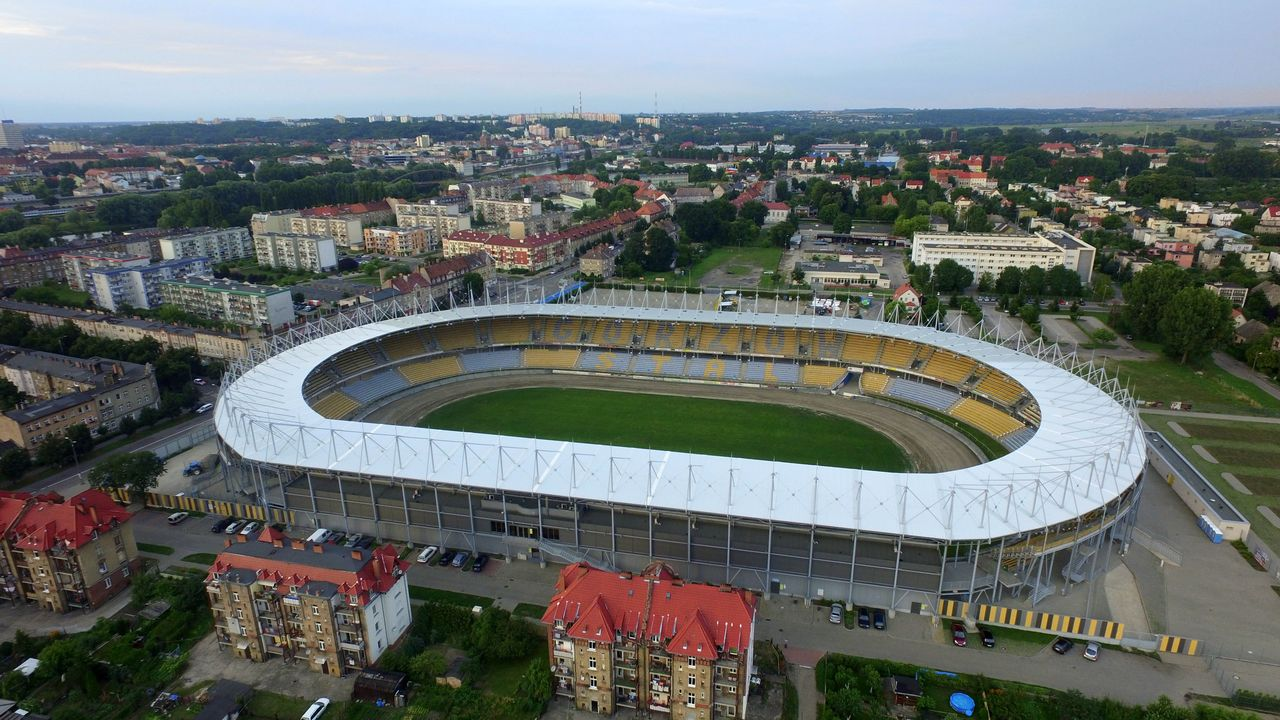
Aerial in 2015

== See also ==
- Speedway in Poland
- Stal Gorzów Wielkopolski
