= 2010 Speedway World Cup Event 1 =

2010 FIM Speedway World Cup – Event 1
Information
- Date: 25 July 2010
- City: Gorzów Wielkopolski
- Event: 1 of 4 (40)
- Referee: Jim Lawrence
- Jury President: Boris Kotnjek

Stadium details
- Stadium: Edward Jancarz Stadium
- Length: 329 m
- Track: speedway track

SWC Results
- Best Time: (Poland) Rune Holta; 64.21 secs (in Heat 2)
Winner		Poland - 68 pts
Runner-up		Denmark - 45 pts
3rd place		Russia - 31 pts
4th place		Czech Republic - 8 pts

The 2010 FIM PGE Polska Grupa Energetyczna Speedway World Cup Event 1 was the first race of the 2010 Speedway World Cup season. It took place on 25 July 2010 at the Edward Jancarz Stadium in Gorzów Wielkopolski, Poland.

It was scheduled to take place on July 24. However, the meeting was delay because the track was deemed unsuitable by the FIM Jury due to adverse weather conditions. The event was re-staged on the next day at 3pm.

== Results ==
The event was dominated by host team and the defending champion Poland team who scored 68 points in 25 heats - the highest score ever recorded in the competition for a four-team event (since the 2004 Speedway World Cup). Denmark (45 points, without injury former three-time World Champion Nicki Pedersen) and Russia (31 points, without injury star Emil Sayfutdinov) goes into the Race-off. Czech Republic (only 8 points) were knocked out of the competition.

It was the Speedway World Cup debut for two riders: Artem Laguta of Russia (8 pts), and Martin Málek of Czech Republic (0 pts).

Pos.	National team	Pts.
1	Poland	68
2	Denmark	45
3	Russia	31
4	Czech Republic	8

== Heat details ==
Placing	Team / Rider Name	Total	1	2	3	4	5	6	7	8	9	10	11	12	13	14	15	16	17	18	19	20	21	22	23	24	25
1	Poland	68	2	5	8	10	13	15	18	21	24	27	29	31	34	37	40	43	44	47	50	53	56	59	62	65	68
1	(1) Jarosław Hampel	14	2						3								3				3				3
1	(2) Rune Holta	14		3						3			2									3				3
1	(3) Tomasz Gollob (c)	14			3						3			2				3									3
1	(4) Adrian Miedziński	12				2						3			3				1				3
1	(5) Janusz Kołodziej	14					3	2								3				3				3
2	Denmark	45	3	4	6	9	11	12	12	14	14	15	16	19	23	25	27	29	32	34	36	37	39	41	42	44	45
2	(1) Kenneth Bjerre	10	3								0				4J							1		2
2	(2) Niels Kristian Iversen	7		1								1				2		2							1
2	(3) Hans N. Andersen (c)	10			2			1									2		3							2
2	(4) Nicolai Klindt	7				3			0				1							2							1
2	(5) Bjarne Pedersen	11					2			2				3							2		2
Placing	Team / Rider Name	Total	1	2	3	4	5	6	7	8	9	10	11	12	13	14	15	16	17	18	19	20	21	22	23	24	25
3	Russia	31	1	3	4	5	6	9	10	10	11	13	16	17	17	17	18	18	20	21	22	24	25	26	28	29	31
3	(1) Artem Laguta	8	1					3					3					0J					1
3	(2) Renat Gafurov	7		2					1					1					2					1
3	(3) Grigory Laguta (c)	4			1					0					0					1					2
3	(4) Denis Gizatullin	4				1					1					Fx					1					1
3	(5) Roman Povazhny	8					1					2					1					2					2
4	Czech Republic	8	0	0	0	0	0	0	2	3	5	5	5	5	6	7	7	8	8	8	8	8	8	8	8	8	8
4	(1) Lukáš Dryml	2	X							1						1			0		R4						0
4	(2) Aleš Dryml, Jr. (c)	2		0							2						0			0			0
4	(3) Martin Málek	0			0							0	0								-			0
4	(4) Zdeněk Simota	0				0		0						0								0			0
4	(5) Matěj Kůs	4					0		2						1			1								0J
Placing	Team / Rider Name	Total	1	2	3	4	5	6	7	8	9	10	11	12	13	14	15	16	17	18	19	20	21	22	23	24	25

M - exclusion for exceeding two minute time allowance • T - exclusion for touching the tapes • X - other exclusion • E - retired or mechanical failure • F - fell

Helmet colours was permanent for each teams (Red, Blue, White and Yellow/Black). Colours in diagrams means gate positions:
gate A – inside	gate B	gate C	gate D – outside

=== Heat after heat ===
1. [64,28] Bjerre, Hampel, A.Laguta, L.Dryml (X)
2. [64,21] Holta, Gafurov, Iversen, A.Dryml
3. [65,12] Gollob, Andersen, G.Laguta, Málek
4. [65,40] Klindt, Miedziński, Gizatulin, Simota
5. [64,44] Kołodziej, Pedersen, Povazhny, Kůs
6. [64,93] A.Laguta, Kołodziej, Andersen, Simota
7. [64,91] Hampel, Kůs, Gafurov, Klindt
8. [64,92] Holta, Pedersen, L.Dryml, G.Laguta
9. [64,94] Gollob, A.Dryml, Gizatulin, Bjerre
10. [64,69] Miedziński, Povazhny, Iversen, Málek
11. [65,50] A.Laguta, Holta, Klindt, Málek
12. [65,18] Bjarne Pedersen, Gollob, Gafurov, Simota
13. [64,96] Miedziński, Bjerre (J), Kůs, G.Laguta
14. [64,79] Kołodziej, Iversen, L.Dryml, Gizatulin (Fx)
15. [64,60] Hampel, Andersen, Povazhny, A.Dryml
16. [65,56] Gollob, Iversen, Kůs, A.Laguta (J)
17. [65,25] Andersen, Gafurov, Miedziński, L.Dryml
18. [65,31] Kołodziej, Klindt, G.Laguta, A.Dryml
19. [65,00] Hampel, Pedersen, Gizatulin, L.Dryml (TS) (R)
20. [65,28] Holta, Povazhny, Bjerre, Simota
21. [65,72] Miedziński, Pedersen, A.Laguta, A.Dryml
22. [65,38] Kołodziej, Bjerre, Gafurov, Málek
23. [65,09] Hampel, G.Laguta, Iversen, Simota
24. [65,16] Holta, Andersen, Gizatulin, Kůs (J)
25. [65,00] Gollob, Povazhny, Klindt, L.Dryml

== See also ==
- 2010 Speedway World Cup
- motorcycle speedway
