= 1994 Edward Jancarz Memorial =

Seasons
- ← 1993 1996 →

The 3rd Edward Jancarz Memorial was the 1994 version of the Edward Jancarz Memorial. It took place on 15 May in the Stal Gorzów Stadium in Gorzów Wielkopolski, Poland. The Memorial was won by Joe Screen who beat Greg Hancock and Billy Hamill.

== Heat details ==
- 15 May (Sunday)
- Best Time: 65.32 - Ryszard Franczyszyn in Heat 10
- Attendance: ?
- Referee: Roman Siwiak

Placing	Rider	Total	1	2	3	4	5	6	7	8	9	10	11	12	13	14	15	16	17	18	19	20	Pts	Pos	21	22
1	(United Kingdom) (6) Joe Screen (CZE)	13		1				3			3							3			3		13	2		3
2	(United States) (7) Greg Hancock (LES)	13		3					3					3	1					3			13	1		2
3	(United States) (1) Billy Hamill (GOR)	11	3				2				1				3				2				11	4	3	
4	(Poland) (5) Ryszard Franczyszyn (GOR)	11		0			3					3					3					2	11	3	2	
5	(Czech Republic) (12) Bohumil Brhel (GOR)	10			3					3		0			2						2		10	5		
6	(Sweden) (11) Tony Rickardsson (TAR)	10			R				2		2					3						3	10	6		
7	(Poland) (15) Piotr Paluch (GOR)	9				2			1			1						2	3				9	7		
8	(Poland) (13) Roman Jankowski (LES)	8				3	2							1		2					0		8	8		
9	(Poland) (3) Jarosław Olszewski (GDA)	7	1						0				3				2				1		7	9		
10	(Poland) (10) Piotr Świst (GOR)	7			2			2						2			0		1				7	10		
11	(Russia) (8) Grigorij Charczenko	6		2						2			1			1			R4				6	11		
12	(Netherlands) (16) Simon Wigg (LES)	5				1				1	0						1			2			5	12		
13	(Poland) (9) Marek Kępa (LUB)	5			1		0						2					1		1			5	13		
14	(Poland) (2) Andrzej Huszcza (ZIE)	3	0					1				2				R4				0			3	14		
15	(Poland) (4) Marek Hućko (GOR)	2	2							0				R4				-				N	2	15		
16	(United Kingdom) (14) Andy Smith (BYD)	0				0		F					R4		-							-	0	16		
	(Poland) (R1) Cezary Owiżyc (PIŁ)	1													0			R4				1	1			
Placing	Rider	Total	1	2	3	4	5	6	7	8	9	10	11	12	13	14	15	16	17	18	19	20	Pts	Pos	21	22

m - exclusion for exceeding two minute time allowance • t - exclusion for touching the tapes • x - other exclusion • e - retired or mechanical failure • f - fell • ns - non-starter • nc - non-classify

gate A - inside	gate B	gate C	gate D - outside

=== Heat after heat ===
1. (66.22) Hamill, Hućko, Olszewsk, Huszcza
2. (66.81) Hancock, Charczenko, Screen, Franczyszyn
3. (66.84) Brhel, Świst, Kępa, Rickardsson (R)
4. (67.81) Jankowski, Paluch, Wigg, Smith
5. (66.15) Franczyszyn, Hamill, Jankowski, Kępa
6. (65.63) Screen, Świst, Huszcza, Smith (F)
7. (65.34) Hancock, Rickardsson, Paluch, Olszewski
8. (65.56) Brhel, Charczenko, Wigg, Hućko
9. (66.81) Screen, Rickardsson, Hamill, Wigg
10. (65.32) Franczyszyn, Huszcza, Paluch, Brhel
11. (67.53) Olszewski, Kępa, Charczenko, Smith (R4)
12. (66.04) Hancock, Świst, Jankowski, Hućko (R4)
13. (65.48) Hamill, Brhel, Hancock, Owiżyc, Smith (-)
14. (65.72) Rickardsson, Jankowski, Charczenko, Huszcza (R4)
15. (65.59) Franczyszyn, Olszewski, Wigg, Świst
16. (67.37) Screen, Paluch, Kępa, Owiżyc (R4), Hućko (-)
17. (66.97) Paluch, Hamill, Świst, Charczenko (R4)
18. (67.04) Hancock, Wigg, Kępa, Huszcza
19. (65.90) Screen, Brhel, Olszewski, Jankowski
20. (65.72) Rickardsson, Franczyszyn, Owiżyc, Smith (-), Hućko (N)
  Third place Run-Off
21. (65.53) Hamill, Franczyszyn
  First place Run-Off
22. (67.53) Screen, Hancock

== See also ==
- motorcycle speedway
- 1994 in sports
