= 2008 Edward Jancarz Memorial =

Seasons
- ← 2007 2009 →

The 11th Edward Jancarz Memorial was the 2008 version of the Edward Jancarz Memorial. It took place on 21 June in the Stal Gorzów Stadium in Gorzów Wielkopolski, Poland. The Memorial was won by Jason Crump who beat Nicki Pedersen, Krzysztof Kasprzak and Tomasz Gollob in the final.

== Heat details ==
- 21 June 2007 (Saturday)
- Best Time: 61.35 - Nicki Pedersen in Heat 6
- Attendance: ?
- Referee: Leszek Demski

Placing	Rider	Total	1	2	3	4	5	6	7	8	9	10	11	12	13	14	15	16	17	18	19	20	Pts	Pos	21
1	(Australia) (1) Jason Crump (WRO)	13	2				3				3				2				3				13	2	3
2	(Denmark) (14) Nicki Pedersen (CZE)	15				3		3					3		3							3	15	1	2
3	(Poland) (2) Krzysztof Kasprzak (LES)	11	3					1				3				3				1			11	3	1
4	(Poland) (15) Tomasz Gollob (GOR)	11				2			3			1						3	2				11	4	0
5	(Poland) (16) Damian Baliński (LES)	10				1				3	1						3			2			10	5	
6	(Australia) (6) Leigh Adams (LES)	9		1				2			2							2			2		9	6	
7	(Poland) (7) Wiesław Jaguś (TOR)	8		0					1					3	1					3			8	7	
8	(Poland) (3) Rafał Dobrucki (ZIE)	8	1						0				2				2				3		8	8	
9	(Poland) (5) Rune Holta (GOR)	8		3			2					2					R1					1	8	9	
10	(Poland) (12) Sebastian Ułamek (CZE)	6			3					2		0			0						1		6	10	
11	(Sweden) (4) Peter Karlsson (GOR)	5	0							1				2				0				2	5	11	
12	(Poland) (13) Janusz Kołodziej (TAR)	4				0	1							1		2					0		4	12	
13	(Poland) (8) Karol Ząbik (TOR)	4		2						0			1			0			1				4	13	
14	(Sweden) (11) Magnus Zetterström (GDA)	3			0				2		0					1						0	3	14	
15	(Poland) (10) Paweł Hlib (GOR)	2			2			0						0			T/-		0				2	15	
16	(Sweden) (9) David Ruud (OST)	2			1		0						0					1		0			2	16	
17	(Poland) (17) Adrian Szewczykowski (GOR)	1															1						1	17	
	(Poland) (18) Paweł Zmarzlik (GOR)	0																					0		
Placing	Rider	Total	1	2	3	4	5	6	7	8	9	10	11	12	13	14	15	16	17	18	19	20	Pts	Pos	21

m - exclusion for exceeding two minute time allowance • t - exclusion for touching the tapes • x - other exclusion • e - retired or mechanical failure • f - fell • ns - non-starter • nc - non-classify

gate A - inside	gate B	gate C	gate D - outside

=== Heat after heat ===
1. Kasprzak, Crump, Dobrucki, Karlsson
2. Holta, Ząbik, Adams, Jaguś
3. Ułamek, Hlib, Ruud, Zetterstroem
4. Pedersen, Gollob, Baliński, Kołodziej
5. Crump, Holta, Kołodziej, Ruud
6. Pedersen, Adams, Kasprzak, Hlib
7. Gollob, Zetterstroem, Jaguś, Dobrucki
8. Baliński, Ułamek, Karlsson, Ząbik
9. Crump, Adams, Baliński, Zetterstroem
10. Kasprzak, Holta, Gollob, Ułamek
11. Pedersen, Dobrucki, Ząbik, Ruud
12. Jaguś, Karlsson, Kołodziej, Hlib
13. Pedersen, Crump, Jaguś, Ułamek
14. Kasprzak, Kołodziej, Zetterstroem, Ząbik
15. Baliński, Dobrucki, Szewczykowski, Holta (R1), Hlib (R/-)
16. Gollob, Adams, Ruud, Karlsson
17. Crump, Gollob, Ząbik, Hlib
18. Jaguś, Baliński, Kasprzak, Ruud
19. Dobrucki, Adams, Ułamek, Kołodziej
20. Pedersen, Karlsson, Holta, Zetterstroem
  The Final (top four riders)
21. Crump, Pedersen, Kasprzak, Gollob

== See also ==
- motorcycle speedway
- 2008 in sports
