= 1993 Edward Jancarz Memorial =

Seasons
- ← 1992 1994 →

The 2nd Edward Jancarz Memorial was the 1993 version of the Edward Jancarz Memorial, a motorcycle speedway race. It took place on 10 June in the Stal Gorzów Stadium in Gorzów Wielkopolski, Poland. The Memorial was won by Gary Havelock who beat Piotr Świst and Antonín Kasper, Jr.

== Heat details ==
- 10 June 1993 (Thursday)
- Best Time: 64.34 - Hans Nielsen in Heat 10
- Attendance: ?
- Referee: Stanisław Pieńkowski

Placing	Rider	Total	1	2	3	4	5	6	7	8	9	10	11	12	13	14	15	16	17	18	19	20	Pts	Pos	21
1	(United Kingdom) (14) Gary Havelock (GOR)	12				3		3					2		1							3	12	1	
2	(Poland) (11) Piotr Świst (GOR)	11			3				2		3					1						2	11	2	3
3	(Czech Republic) (9) Antonín Kasper, Jr. (GNI)	11			1		2						3					2		3			11	3	2
4	(Denmark) (5) Hans Nielsen (LUB)	10		3			3					3					X					1	10	4	
5	(Poland) (2) Piotr Baron (WRO)	10	3					R				2				3				2			10	5	
6	(Poland) (7) Sławomir Dudek (ZIE)	8		2					3					0	3					T/-			8	6	
7	(Poland) (10) Piotr Paluch (GOR)	8			0			1						3			3		1				8	7	
8	(Poland) (13) Andrzej Huszcza (ZIE)	8				0	1							2		2					3		8	8	
9	(United Kingdom) (12) Sean Wilson	7			2					2		0			2						1		7	9	
10	(Russia) (6) Grigorij Charczenko (PIŁ)	6		1				2			0							3			0		6	10	
11	(Czech Republic) (4) Bohumil Brhel (GOR)	5	0							3				1				1				0	5	11	
12	(Poland) (1) Ryszard Franczyszyn (GOR)	5	1				0				2				0				2				5	12	
13	(Poland) (3) Robert Sawina (TOR)	5	2						0				1				X				2		5	13	
14	(Poland) (16) Jarosław Łukaszewski (GOR)	5				2				0	1						2			R			5	14	
15	(Poland) (8) Krzysztof Kuczwalski (TOR)	4		X						1			0			0			3				4	15	
16	(Poland) (15) Robert Flis (GOR)	3				1			1			1						-	0				3	16	
	(Poland) (R1) Marek Hućko (GOR)	0																0		R			0		
Placing	Rider	Total	1	2	3	4	5	6	7	8	9	10	11	12	13	14	15	16	17	18	19	20	Pts	Pos	21

m - exclusion for exceeding two minute time allowance • t - exclusion for touching the tapes • x - other exclusion • e - retired or mechanical failure • f - fell • ns - non-starter • nc - non-classify

gate A - inside	gate B	gate C	gate D - outside

=== Heat after heat ===
1. (67.58) Baron, Sawina, Franczyszyn, Brhel
2. (64.50) Nielsen, Dudek, Charczenko, Kuczwalski (X)
3. (66.88) Świst, Wilson, Kasper, Paluch
4. (66.19) Havelock, Łukaszewski, Flis, Huszcza
5. (64.46) Nielsen, Kasper, Huszcza, Franczyszyn
6. (67.99) Havelock, Charczenko, Paluch, Baron (R)
7. (67.46) Dudek, Świst, Flis, Sawina
8. (66.96) Brhel, Wilson, Kuczwalski, Łukaszewski
9. (66.39) Świst, Franczyszyn, Łukaszewski, Charczenko
10. (64.34) Nielsen, Baron, Flis, Wilson
11. (66.08) Kasper, Havelock, Sawina, Kuczwalski
12. (68.81) Paluch, Huszcza, Brhel, Dudek
13. (67.12) Dudek, Wilson, Havelock, Franczyszyn
14. (68.31) Baron, Huszcza, Świst, Kuczwalski
15. (69.44) Paluch, Łukaszewski, Sawina (x), Nielsen (X)
16. (68.16) Charczenko, Kasper, Brhel, Hućko, Flis (-)
17. (68.88) Kuczwalski, Franczyszyn, Paluch, Flis
18. (67.94) Kasper, Baron, Hućko (R), Łukaszewski (R), Dudek (T/-)
19. (67.10) Huszcza, Sawina, Wilson, Charczenko
20. (68.27) Havelock, Świst, Nielsen, Brhel
  Second place Run-Off
21. (66.26) Świst, Kasper

== See also ==
- motorcycle speedway
- 1993 in sports
