= 2005 Edward Jancarz Memorial =

Seasons
- ← 2001 2007 →

The 9th Edward Jancarz Memorial was the 2005 version of the Edward Jancarz Memorial. It took place on 4 June in the Stal Gorzów Stadium in Gorzów Wielkopolski, Poland. The Memorial was won by Jason Crump who beat Rune Holta, Leigh Adams and Tony Rickardsson in the final.

== Heat details ==
- 4 June 2005 (Saturday)
- Best Time: 62.68 - Rune Holta in Heat 4
- Attendance: 7,000
- Referee: Wojciech Grodzki

Placing	Rider	Total	1	2	3	4	5	6	7	8	9	10	11	12	13	14	15	16	17	18	19	20	Pts	Pos	21
1	(Australia) (1) Jason Crump (TOR)	11	3				2				0				3				3				11	3	3
2	(Poland) (16) Rune Holta (CZE)	15				3				3	3						3			3			15	1	2
3	(Australia) (11) Leigh Adams (LES)	12			2				3		1					3						3	12	2	1
4	(Sweden) (14) Tony Rickardsson (TAR)	11				2		3					3		1							2	11	4	0
5	(Poland) (12) Damian Baliński (LES)	10			3					2		1			2						2		10	5	
6	(Sweden) (8) David Ruud (PIŁ)	8		3						1			2			0			2				8	6	
7	(Denmark) (9) Hans N. Andersen (WRO)	8			1		3						0					2		2			8	7	
8	(Poland) (3) Maciej Kuciapa (RZE)	8	1						2				1				1				3		8	8	
9	(Poland) (2) Robert Miśkowiak (WRO)	7	0					1				3				2				1			7	9	
10	(Poland) (6) Tomasz Chrzanowski (GDA)	7		2				2			2							1			R3		7	10	
11	(Poland) (4) Wiesław Jaguś (TOR)	5	2							0				0				3				R3	5	11	
12	(United Kingdom) (13) Mark Loram (GOR)	5				F4	0							3		1					1		5	12	
13	(Poland) (5) Piotr Paluch (GOR)	5		1			1					0					2					1	5	13	
14	(Poland) (15) Paweł Hlib (GOR)	4				1			1			2						F2	R2				4	14	
15	(Poland) (7) Kamil Brzozowski (GOR)	2		0					0					2	0					0			2	15	
16	(Poland) (10) Michał Rajkowski (GOR)	2			0			0						1			0		1				2	16	
	(Poland) (R1) Jarosław Łukaszewski (GOR)	0																					0		
	(Poland) (R2) Robert Flis (GOR)	0																					0		
Placing	Rider	Total	1	2	3	4	5	6	7	8	9	10	11	12	13	14	15	16	17	18	19	20	Pts	Pos	21

m - exclusion for exceeding two minute time allowance • t - exclusion for touching the tapes • x - other exclusion • e - retired or mechanical failure • f - fell • ns - non-starter • nc - non-classify

gate A - inside	gate B	gate C	gate D - outside

=== Heat after heat ===
1. (62.75) Crump, Jaguś, Kuciapa, Miśkowiak
2. (63.69) Ruud, Chrzanowski, Paluch, Brzozowski
3. (64.28) Baliński, Adams, Andersen, Rajkowski
4. (62.68) Holta, Rickardsson, Hlib, Loram (F4)
5. (63.47) Andersen, Crump, Paluch, Loram
6. (63.18) Rickardsson, Chrzanowski, Miśkowiak, Rajkowski
7. (64.06) Adams, Kuciapa, Hlib, Brzozowski
8. (64.28) Holta, Baliński, Ruud, Jaguś
9. (63.39) Holta, Chrzanowski, Adams, Crump
10. (65.00) Miśkowiak, Hlib, Baliński, Paluch
11. (62.87) Rickardsson, Ruud, Kuciapa, Andersen
12. (65.84) Loram, Brzozowski, Rajkowski, Jaguś
13. (64.81) Crump, Baliński, Rickardsson, Brzozowski
14. (65.12) Adams, Miśkowiak, Loram, Ruud
15. (65.56) Holta, Paluch, Kuciapa, Rajkowski
16. (65.65) Jaguś, Andersen, Chrzanowski, Hlib (R2)
17. (65.56) Crump, Ruud, Rajkowski, Hlib (R2)
18. (64.91) Holta, Andersen, Miśkowiak, Brzozowski
19. (65.53) Kuciapa, Baliński, Loram, Chrzanowski (R3)
20. (65.68) Adams, Rickardsson, Paluch, Jaguś (R3)
  The Final (top four riders)
21. (64,35) Crump, Holta, Adams, Rickardsson

== See also ==
- motorcycle speedway
- 2005 in sports
