= 2010 Speedway World Cup Race-off =

2010 FIM Speedway World Cup – Race-Off
Information
- Date: 29 July 2010
- City: Vojens
- Event: 3 of 4 (42)
- Referee: Craig Ackroyd
- Jury President: Wolfgang Glas

Stadium details
- Stadium: Speedway Center
- Length: 300 m
- Track: speedway track

SWC Results
- Best Time: (Sweden) Fredrik Lindgren; 59.2 secs (in Heat 1)
Winner		Denmark - 48 pts
Runner-up		Sweden - 47 pts
3rd place		Australia - 36 pts
4th place		Russia - 19 pts

The 2010 FIM PGE Polska Grupa Energetyczna Speedway World Cup Race-Off was the third race of the 2010 Speedway World Cup season. It took place on 29 July 2010 at the Speedway Center in Vojens, Denmark.

== Results ==
The Race-off was won by host team Denmark (48 pts), and they qualify to the Final. Sweden (47 pts) was quality also. The last two teams, Australia (36 pts) and Russia (19 pts) were knocked out of the competition, and were classified 5th and 6th place in World Cup. Only one rider did not participated in the Event One or Two (Andreas Jonsson replaced Daniel Nermark in Sweden team). Both "Jokers" (Povazhny in Heat 12 and Holder in Heat 15) finished 4th and scoring 0 points.

Pos.	National team	Pts.
1	Denmark	48
2	Sweden	47
3	Australia	36
4	Russia	19

== Heat details ==
Placing	Team / Rider Name	Total	1	2	3	4	5	6	7	8	9	10	11	12	13	14	15	16	17	18	19	20	21	22	23	24	25
1	Denmark	48	2	3	4	6	7	9	12	14	16	17	20	22	25	27	30	33	35	36	38	40	41	43	45	46	48
1	(1) Kenneth Bjerre	10	2							2						2			2								2
1	(2) Nicolai Klindt	8		1							2						3			1			1
1	(3) Niels Kristian Iversen	9			1							1	3								2			2
1	(4) Bjarne Pedersen	10				2		2						2								2			2
1	(5) Hans N. Andersen (c)	11					1		3						3			3								1
2	Sweden	47	3	5	8	11	14	15	17	17	20	22	22	25	27	27	29	29	32	34	37	40	40	40	43	46	47
2	(1) Fredrik Lindgren	11	3								3				2							3		0
2	(2) Jonas Davidsson	7		2								2				0		0							3
2	(3) Magnus Zetterström (c)	12			3			1									2		3							3
2	(4) Andreas Jonsson	8				3			2				0							2							1
2	(5) Antonio Lindbäck	9					3			T				3							3		0
Placing	Team / Rider Name	Total	1	2	3	4	5	6	7	8	9	10	11	12	13	14	15	16	17	18	19	20	21	22	23	24	25
3	Australia	36	1	4	6	7	9	9	10	13	13	16	18	19	20	21	21	23	23	26	27	27	29	30	31	33	36
3	(1) Davey Watt (c)	7	1					0					2					2					2
3	(2) Darcy Ward	6		3					1					1					0					1
3	(3) Rory Schlein	11			2					3					1	1				3					1
3	(4) Troy Batchelor	4				1					X					-					1					2
3	(5) Chris Holder	8					2					3					0J					0					3
4	Russia	19	0	0	0	0	0	3	3	4	5	5	6	6	6	9	10	11	12	12	12	13	16	19	19	19	19
4	(1) Artem Laguta	1	0						0								1				0				0
4	(2) Grigory Laguta (c)	3		0						1			1									1				0
4	(3) Roman Povazhny	2			0						1			0J				1									0
4	(4) Denis Gizatullin	4				0						0			0				1				3
4	(5) Renat Gafurov	9					0	3								3				0				3
Placing	Team / Rider Name	Total	1	2	3	4	5	6	7	8	9	10	11	12	13	14	15	16	17	18	19	20	21	22	23	24	25

M - exclusion for exceeding two minute time allowance • T - exclusion for touching the tapes • X - other exclusion • E - retired or mechanical failure • F - fell

Helmet colours was permanent for each teams (Red, Blue, White and Yellow/Black). Colours in diagrams means gate positions:
gate A – inside	gate B	gate C	gate D – outside

=== Heat after heat ===
1. [59.2] Lindgren, Bjerre, Watt, A.Laguta
2. [59.8] Ward, Davidsson, Klindt, G.Laguta
3. [59.9] Zetterström, Schlein, Iversen, Povazhny
4. [59.7] Jonsson, Pedersen, Batchelor, Gizatulin
5. [59.7] Lindbäck, Holder, Andersen, Gafurov
6. [59.3] Gafurov, Pedersen, Zetterström, Watt
7. [59.8] Andersen, Jonsson, Ward, A.Laguta
8. [60.3] Schlein, Bjerre, G.Laguta, Lindbäck (T)
9. [60.6] Lindgren, Klindt, Povazhny, Batchelor (Fx)
10. [60.6] Holder, Davidsson, Iversen, Gizatulin
11. [61.4] Iversen, Watt, G.Laguta, Jonsson
12. [60.3] Lindbäck, Pedersen, Ward, Povazhny (J)
13. [60.5] Andersen, Lindgren, Schlein, Gizatulin
14. [60.5] Gafurov, Bjerre, Schlein (TS), Davidsson
15. [60.4] Klindt, Zetterström, A.Laguta, Holder (J)
16. [61.0] Andersen, Watt, Povazhny, Davidsson
17. [60.9] Zetterström, Bjerre, Gizatulin, Ward
18. [61.0] Schlein, Jonsson, Klindt, Gafurov
19. [60.7] Lindbäck, Iversen, Batchelor, A.Laguta
20. [60.5] Lindgren, Pedersen, G.Laguta, Holder
21. [60.3] Gizatulin, Watt, Klindt, Lindbäck
22. [60.7] Gafurov, Iversen, Ward, Lindgren
23. [60.5] Davidsson, Pedersen, Schlein, A.Laguta
24. [60.8] Zetterström, Batchelor, Andersen, G.Laguta
25. [60.8] Holder, Bjerre, Jonsson, Povazhny

== See also ==
- 2010 Speedway World Cup
- motorcycle speedway
