= John Oliver (speedway rider) =

Australian motorcycle speedway rider (born 1987)

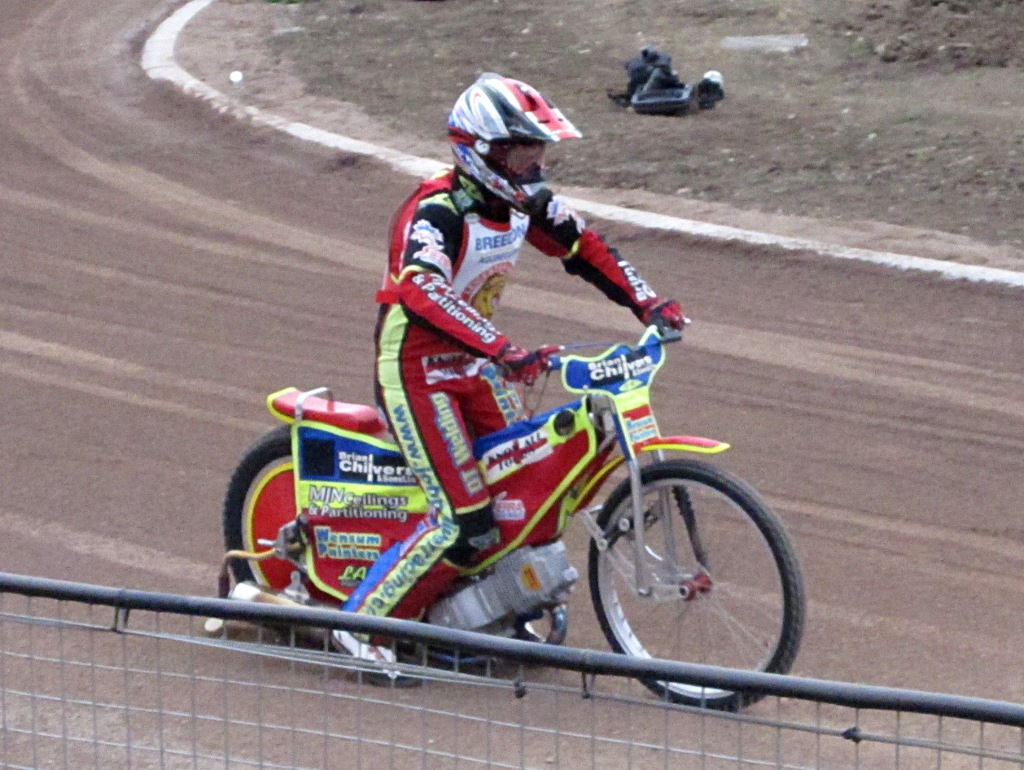
- Born: 22 July 1987 (age 39); Brisbane, Australia
- Nationality: Australian

Career history

Great Britain
- 2003–2004, 2006–2008: King's Lynn
- 2011: Leicester
- 2011: Scunthorpe

John Oliver (born 22 July 1987) is an Australian former motorcycle speedway rider, who has raced for King's Lynn Stars and Leicester Lions.

== Career ==
Born in Brisbane, Oliver raced in Britain in 2003 for a short spell at Mildenhall then moved onto Carmarthen and Buxton, before moving to Boston the following year. After returning to Australia, he rode in 2006 for King's Lynn, although his career was hampered by a broken thigh bone in early 2007. He had a successful season for King's Lynn on his return but suffered a broken collar bone in September 2008. He again returned to Australia, but joined Premier League team Leicester Lions for the 2011 season, on loan from King's Lynn, later completing a full transfer. In August 2011, he was released by Leicester, moving to Scunthorpe Saints National League team.

Oliver's 2011 season was ended by a crash on his home debut at Scunthorpe in which he broke both ankles and two vertebrae. He subsequently retired from speedway.
