= 2010 Speedway World Cup =

51st edition of the annual motorcycle speedway World Cup competition

Speedway World Cup
- Venue: Vojens
- Location: Denmark
- Start date: 24 July
- End date: 1 August
- Nations: 8

Champions
- Poland

The 2010 FIM PGE Polska Grupa Energetyczna Speedway World Cup (SWC) was the tenth FIM Speedway World Cup, the annual international speedway world championship tournament. It was originally scheduled to take place between 24 July and 31 July 2010, although re-stagings due to adverse weather meant that it finally took place between 25 July and 1 August, and involved eight national teams. Six teams were seeded through to the finals and two qualification rounds were held in May 2010 to determine the final two places.

Poland won the World Cup for the fourth time in six seasons, amassing 44 points in the final. Denmark finished second with 39, while Sweden finished third for the third successive year, with 35 points.

== Qualification ==
The top six nations from the 2009 Speedway World Cup (Poland, Australia, Sweden, Russia, Great Britain and Denmark) were granted automatic qualification, with the remaining two places divided among two qualifying rounds. Qualifying Round One was held in Lonigo, Italy and was won by Finland. Qualifying Round Two was held in Abensberg, Germany.

- Qualifying Round One
- (Italy) Santa Marina Stadium, Lonigo
- 1 May 2010

Pos.	National team	Pts
1	Finland	48
2	Slovenia	47
3	United States	30
4	Italy	24

- Qualifying Round Two
- (Germany) Altes Stadion, Abensberg
- 24 May 2010

Pos.	National team	Pts
1	Czech Republic	53
2	Germany	50
3	Latvia	43
4	Norway	4

=== Qualified teams ===
Team	Qualified as	Finals appearance	Last appearance	2009 place
Poland	2009 SWC top six	10th	2009	1st
Australia	2009 SWC top six	10th	2009	2nd
Sweden	2009 SWC top six	10th	2009	3rd
Russia	2009 SWC top six	8th	2009	4th
Great Britain	2009 SWC top six	10th	2009	5th
Denmark	2009 SWC top six	10th	2009	6th
Czech Republic	QR 2 Winner	9th	2009	8th
Finland	QR 1 Winner	6th	2007	—

== Tournament ==
Semifinals
25 July – Gorzów Wlkp. (details)
Poland	68
Denmark	45
Russia	31
Czech Republic	8
26 July – King's Lynn (details)
Great Britain	51
Australia	48
Sweden	40
Finland	14

Race-off
29 July – Vojens (details)
Denmark	48
Sweden	47
Australia	36
Russia	19

Final
1 August – Vojens (details)
Poland	44
Denmark	39
Sweden	35
Great Britain	33

== Final classification ==
Pos.	National team	Pts.
Gold	Poland	44
Silver	Denmark	39
Bronze	Sweden	35
4	Great Britain	33
5	Australia	36
6	Russia	19
7	Finland	14
8	Czech Republic	8

== See also ==
- 2010 Speedway Grand Prix
- 2010 Team Speedway Junior World Championship
