= James Holder (speedway rider) =

Australian speedway rider (born 1986)

Jim Holder
- Born: 7 May 1986 (age 40); Sydney, New South Wales
- Nationality: Australian

Career history
- 2008: Isle of Wight
- 2009: Newport Wasps
- 2010: Stoke Potters
- 2010–2011: Somerset Rebels
- 2012: Plymouth Devils

James Holder (born 5 May 1986) is an Australian former motorcycle speedway rider. He is the older brother of Chris Holder, the 2012 World Champion and Jack Holder, a world team champion.

== Career ==
Holder began his career at the Isle of Wight Islanders in the Premier League. In 2009, he signed for the Newport Wasps after the Islanders quit the Premier League and dropped down a division. His younger brother Chris Holder rides for the Poole Pirates in the British Elite League.

Holder started the 2010 season with the Stoke Potters, but after they let him go part way through the season he was immediately signed by the Somerset Rebels riding as reserve, initially as a 28-day injury cover. In 2011, he was named captain of the Rebels for up the coming season. In the off season, following the 2011 campaign, Holder signed for the Plymouth Devils for the 2012 Premier League season.

Holder's last season was in 2012 with Plymouth.
