= Rory Schlein =

Australian speedway rider (born 1984)

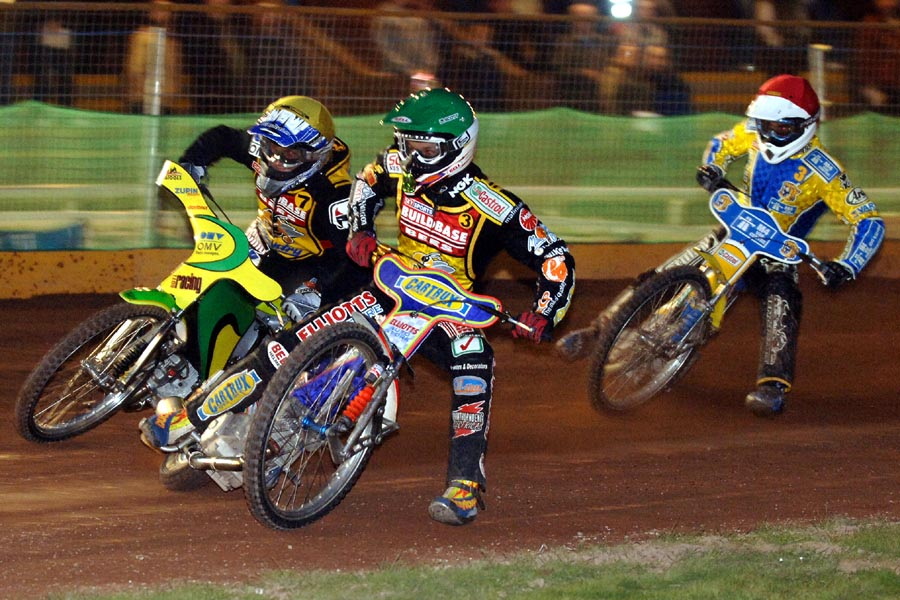
- Schlein riding for Coventry in 2007
- Born: 1 September 1984 (age 42); Darwin, Northern Territory, Australia
- Nationality: Australian

Career history

Great Britain
- 2001–2004: Edinburgh Monarchs
- 2003–2004, 2011–2012: Belle Vue Aces
- 2005–2010: Coventry Bees
- 2008, 2017–2018: Ipswich Witches
- 2010: Peterborough Panthers
- 2013–2016: King's Lynn Stars
- 2017–2021, 2023: Wolverhampton Wolves
- 2019: Somerset Rebels
- 2021: Poole Pirates
- 2023–2024: Berwick Bandits

Sweden
- 2006, 2015: Indianerna
- 2007–2008: Smederna
- 2009: Dackarna
- 2011–2012: Hammarby
- 2014: Piraterna

Poland
- 2007, 2011, 2017: Rybnik
- 2008: Wrocław
- 2009–2010: Grudziądz
- 2012: Ostrów
- 2013, 2015–2016, 2019: Łódź
- 2014: Daugavpils

Individual honours
- 2000: Australian Under-16 Champion
- 2003, 2004: Australian Under-21 Champion
- 2004, 2005, 2006, 2007, 2023: South Australian Champion
- 2004, 2008, 2011, 2018: Scottish Open Champion
- 2005: Jack Young Solo Cup winner
- 2011, 2013: Elite League Riders Champion
- 2020: British Champion

Team honours
- 2007, 2011: World Cup bronze/silver
- 2001: Premier Trophy
- 2001: Conference League
- 2004: Premier League
- 2007: Elite League
- 2007: Elite League KO Cup
- 2007: Craven Shield
- 2021: SGB Championship
- 2021: SGB Championship Knockout Cup
- 2019: SGB Championship Fours

Rory Robert Schlein (born 1 September 1984) is an Australian speedway rider.

== Career ==
Born in Darwin, Northern Territory, Schlein, lived in the southern Adelaide suburb of Hallett Cove and won the Australian Under-16 Championship at the Northline Speedway in his home town of Darwin in 2000.

Schlein was signed by the Edinburgh Monarchs in 2001 and won the Conference League championship that year while on loan at Sheffield Tigers. He won the Premier League championship with the Monarchs in 2003 and won the Australian Under-21 Speedway Championship in 2003 and 2004 and finished second to Chris Holder in 2005. He also won the South Australian Championship in 2004, 2005, 2006 and 2007.

Schlein's first extended season in the highest British league was for Belle Vue Aces during the 2004 Elite League speedway season. In 2005, he joined Coventry Bees and would go on to win the Elite League championship with the Bees in 2007. In between Schlein represented the Australia national speedway team at the 2006 and 2007 Speedway World Cup, where he won a bronze medal at the latter.

Schlein was with Coventry from 2005 to 2010 with short stints at Ipswich and Peterborough in between. In 2010, he rode for Australia in the World Cup again and in 2011 won a silver medal in the 2011 World Cup although he only rode in the rounds and not the final. Also in 2011, he joined Belle Vue again and won the Elite League Riders' Championship, held at Abbey Stadium on 15 October.

From 2013 to 2016, Schlein rode for the King's Lynn Stars and won the League Riders' championship for a second time in October 2013.

In May 2015, Schlein was seriously injured while riding for Orzeł Łódź in Poland, breaking two vertebrae and damaging his lung and kidney, ending his season and initially with concern that he could be paralysed. His recovery was documented in the film Addicted To Speed: The Rory Schlein Story. He returned to ride for King's Lynn Stars in 2016, but missed part of the early season with a shoulder injury, and after struggling to score well was dropped in August.

For 2017, Schlein signed for Ipswich Witches in the SGB Championship.

Schlein was part of the Somerset Rebels team that won the SGB Championship Fours, which was held on 23 June 2019, at the East of England Arena.

In 2020, Schlein won the 2020 British Speedway Championship at the National Speedway Stadium in Manchester. In 2021, he helped Poole secure the SGB Championship 2021 league and cup double. He announced his retirement after the 2021 season.

In 2023, Schlein returned to speedway signing for Wolves for the SGB Premiership 2023, he had previously ridden for them from 2017 to 2021. He also signed for Berwick Bandits for the SGB Championship 2023 and won the South Australian Championship for the fifth time.

Schlein's 2024 season ended early after he sustained a fractured neck vertebrae and broken scapular at Scunthorpe.

== Family ==
Schlein is the son of the 1974 Northern Territory solo champion Lyndon Schlein.

== Major results ==
=== Speedway World Cup ===
- 2006 Speedway World Cup - 4th
- 2007 Speedway World Cup - bronze
- 2010 Speedway World Cup - 5th
- 2011 Speedway World Cup - silver

=== Individual Under-21 World Championship ===
- 2004 - (Poland) Wrocław, Olympic Stadium - 4th - 8pts (fell in the Final)
