= 2004 Speedway Grand Prix Qualification =

The 2004 Speedway Grand Prix Qualification or GP Challenge was a series of motorcycle speedway meetings used to determine the 6 riders that would qualify for the 2004 Speedway Grand Prix to join the other 16 riders that finished in the leading positions from the 2003 Speedway Grand Prix.

The system introduced the previous year, that of four quarter finals and two semi finals was retained and only 6 riders would qualify through the GP Challenge.

Piotr Protasiewicz won the GP Challenge.

== Format ==
- First Round (64 riders qualifying from respective national championships)
- Quarter finals - 32 riders to semi finals
- Semi finals - 16 riders to GP Challenge
- Final Round - 6 riders from the GP Challenge to the 2004 Grand Prix

== Quarter finals ==
32 riders to semi finals (Andrea Maida & Jarosław Hampel seeded to sf)

QF (26 April 2003 (Italy) Lonigo)
Pos	Rider	Points
1	(England) Lee Richardson	13
2	(United States) Billy Janniro	13
3	(United States) Ryan Fisher	11
4	(Czech Republic) Tomáš Topinka	11
5	(Poland) Piotr Protasiewicz	11
6	(Poland) Sebastian Ułamek	10
7	(Netherlands) Theo Pijper	10
8	(Slovenia) Matej Žagar	10
9	(France) Sebastien Trésarrieu	7
10	(Germany) Joachim Kügelmann	6
11	(Germany) Mirko Wolter	6
12	(England) Scott Smith	4
13	(Slovenia) Jernej Kolenko	4
14	(Italy) Simone Terenzani	3
15	(Italy) Christian Miotello	1
16	(Croatia) Marko Vlah	0

QF (1 May 2003 (Hungary) Debrecen)
Pos	Rider	Points
1	(Sweden) Peter Karlsson	13
2	(Poland) Rafał Dobrucki	13
3	(Denmark) Jesper B. Jensen	12
4	(Hungary) Attila Stefáni	11
5	(England) David Howe	11
6	(Hungary) Sándor Tihanyi	10
7	(Russia) Sergej Darkin	9
8	(Poland) Jacek Rempala	8
9	(Hungary) László Szatmári	8
10	(Russia) Oleg Kurguskin	8
11	(Czech Republic) Josef Franc	5
12	(Hungary) Norbert Magosi	4
13	(Denmark) Ronni Pedersen	4
14	(Slovenia) Izak Šantej	3
15	(Austria) Manuel Hauzinger	1
16	(Czech Republic) Tomáš Suchánek	0

QF (3 May 2003 (Norway) Elgane)
Pos	Rider	Points
1	(Poland) Grzegorz Walasek	13
2	(Denmark) Bjarne Pedersen	12
3	(Sweden) David Ruud	12
4	(Denmark) Charlie Gjedde	11
5	(Sweden) Stefan Andersson	10
6	(Finland) Kai Laukkanen	9
7	(Denmark) Hans Andersen	9
8	(Sweden) Peter Ingvar Karlsson	9
9	(United States) Brent Werner	9
10	(England) Chris Harris	8
11	(Norway) Björn Hansen	8
12	(England) Oliver Allen	4
13	(New Zealand) Sam Taylor	3
14	(Norway) Mikke Bjerk	2
15	(Norway) Carl Johan Raugstad	1
16	(Norway) Remi Ueland	0

QF (8 June 2003 (Belgium) Heusden-Zolder)
Pos	Rider	Points
1	(Czech Republic) Lukáš Dryml	12
2	(Czech Republic) Bohumil Brhel	12
3	(Czech Republic) Aleš Dryml Jr.	11
4	(Canada) Chris Slabon	11
5	(Sweden) Peter Ljung	11
6	(Finland) Joonas Kylmäkorpi	10
7	(Russia) Roman Povazhny	8
8	(England) Simon Stead	8
9	(Denmark) Kenneth Bjerre	7
10	(Germany) Mathias Schultz	7
11	(Australia) Mark Lemon	6
12	(Sweden) Magnus Zetterström	6
13	(Australia) Craig Watson	5
14	(England) Leigh Lanham	3
15	(Netherlands) Henk Bos	2
16	(South Africa) Warren Meier	0

== Semi finals ==
16 riders from to GP Challenge

SF

- 21 June 2003 (Italy) Terenzano

Pos.	Rider	Points
1	(Sweden) Peter Karlsson	13
2	(England) David Howe	13
3	(United States) Billy Janniro	12
4	(Czech Republic) Aleš Dryml Jr.	10
5	(Poland) Piotr Protasiewicz	9
6	(France) Tomáš Topinka	9
7	(Netherlands) Theo Pijper	8
8	(Denmark) Charlie Gjedde	8
9	(Slovenia) Matej Žagar	7
10	(Canada) Chris Slabon	6
11	(Sweden) Peter Ljung	6
12	(Hungary) László Szatmári (R)	4
13	(Poland) Grzegorz Walasek	4
14	(Poland) Jacek Rempala	4
15	(Sweden) David Ruud	3
16	(Italy) Andrea Maida	3
17	(Hungary) Sándor Tihanyi	0

SF

- 22 June 2003 (Poland) Rybnik

Pos.	Rider	Points
1	(Russia) Roman Povazhny	12
2	(Denmark) Jesper B. Jensen	12
3	(Denmark) Bjarne Pedersen	12
4	(Czech Republic) Bohumil Brhel	11
5	(Poland) Rafał Dobrucki	10
6	(Czech Republic) Lukáš Dryml	10
7	(Finland) Kai Laukkanen	10
8	(Poland) Sebastian Ułamek	8
9	(Finland) Joonas Kylmäkorpi	7
10	(Russia) Sergej Darkin	6
11	(Sweden) Peter Ingvar Karlsson	5
12	(Poland) Jarosław Hampel	5
13	(Hungary) Attila Stefáni	4
14	(England) Simon Stead (R)	3
15	(United States) Ryan Fisher	2
16	(England) Lee Richardson	1
17	(Sweden) Stefan Andersson	2
18	(United States) Brent Werner (R)	1

== Final Round ==
=== GP Challenge ===
6 riders to 2004 Grand Prix

- 17 August 2003 (England) Poole

Pos.	Rider	Total	Points
1	(Poland) Piotr Protasiewicz	14	2, 3, 3, 3, 3
2	(Czech Republic) Bohumil Brhel	13	3, 3, 2, 2, 3
3	(Denmark) Bjarne Pedersen	12	2, 2, 2, 3, 3
4	(Finland) Kai Laukkanen	11	3, 3, 1, 2, 2
5	(Czech Republic) Aleš Dryml Jr.	10	exc, 3, 3, 3, 1
6	(Denmark) Jesper B. Jensen	9	1, ef, 3, 3, 2
7	(Finland) Joonas Kylmäkorpi	7	3, 2, 0, 1, 1
8	(England) Simon Stead (R)	6	1, 0, 3, 2, exc
9	(Poland) Rafał Dobrucki	6	3, 0, 1, 1, 1
10	(United States) Billy Janniro	6	2, 2, 1, 1, 0
11	(Russia) Roman Povazhny	5	exc, 1, 0, 1, 3
12	(Denmark) Charlie Gjedde	5	0, 1, 0, 2, 2
13	(Czech Republic) Tomáš Topinka	5	2, 2, 1, 0, x
14	(Slovenia) Matej Žagar (R)	5	1, -, 2, x, 2
15	(Poland) Sebastian Ułamek	4	1, 1, 2, f, exc
16	(Netherlands) Theo Pijper	1	0, 0, 0, 0, 1
17	(Sweden) Peter Karlsson	0	ef, -, -, -, -
18	(Czech Republic) Lukáš Dryml	-	dns+

+broke his leg and was unable to compete further
