= 2003 Speedway Grand Prix Qualification =

The 2003 Speedway Grand Prix Qualification or GP Challenge was a series of motorcycle speedway meetings used to determine the 6 riders that would qualify for the 2003 Speedway Grand Prix to join the other 16 riders that finished in the leading positions from the 2002 Speedway Grand Prix.

Only 6 riders would qualify through the GP Challenge once again but there was a major change in the lead up to the GP Challenge with a new qualifying format of 4 quarter finals and 2 semi finals. The Intercontinental Final, Continental Final, Overseas Final and Scandinavian Finals were all scrapped.

Lee Richardson won the GP Challenge.

== Format ==
- First Round (7 riders from Poland to quarter final, 6 from Sweden & Great Britain, 5 from Denmark & Czech Republic, 4 from Australia & Germany, 3 riders from United States, Hungary, Italy, Russia & Slovenia, 2 from Norway, Finland, Latvia, 1 rider each from Austria, Canada, Croatia, France, Netherlands and Ukraine)
- Quarter finals - 32 riders to semi finals
- Semi finals - 16 riders to GP Challenge
- Final Round - 6 riders from the GP Challenge to the 2003 Grand Prix

== Quarter finals ==
32 riders to semi finals

QF (27 April 2002 (Italy) Lonigo)
Pos	Rider	Points
1	(Sweden) Peter Karlsson	14
2	(Poland) Piotr Protasiewicz	13
3	(Poland) Robert Dados	12
4	(United States) Ryan Fisher	12
5	(Australia) Steve Johnston	11
6	(England) David Howe	11
7	(Czech Republic) Lukáš Dryml	9
8	(Hungary) Róbert Nagy	7
9	(Italy) Andrea Maida	6
10	(Czech Republic) Josef Franc	5
11	(England) Simon Stead	4
12	(Russia) Eduard Shaihullin	4
13	(Italy) Christian Miotello (R)	4
14	(Germany) Jörg Pingel	4
15	(Italy) Simone Terenzani	2
16	(Italy) Alessandro Milanese (R)	0
17	(France) Stéphane Trésarrieu	0
17	(South Africa) Sandor Lakatos	0

QF (12 May 2002 (Germany) Pfaffenhofen)
Pos	Rider	Points
1	(Denmark) Hans Andersen	12
2	(Denmark) Bjarne Pedersen	12
3	(Russia) Roman Povazhny	11
4	(Russia) Sergej Darkin	9
5	(England) Dean Barker	8
6	(Czech Republic) Bohumil Brhel	8
7	(Poland) Rafał Okoniewski	8
8	(England) Paul Hurry	8
9	(Germany) Joachim Kugelmann	8
10	(Croatia) Zlato Krznaric	8
11	(Germany) Matthias Kröger	7
12	(Czech Republic) Tomáš Topinka	7
13	(Norway) Björn G Hansen	5
14	(Germany) Mirko Wolter	5
15	(Austria) Manuel Hauzinger	2
16	(Germany) Herbert Rudolph (R)	1
17	(Netherlands) Jim Groen	0

QF (18 May 2002 (Slovenia) Ljubljana)
Pos	Rider	Points
1	(Denmark) Charlie Gjedde	14
2	(Poland) Tomasz Bajerski	12
3	(Hungary) Attila Stefáni	10
4	(Slovenia) Matej Žagar	10
5	(Australia) Craig Watson	10
6	(Czech Republic) Aleš Dryml Jr.	10
7	(Sweden) Peter I Karlsson	9
8	(United States) Brent Werner	8
9	(Poland) Jarosław Hampel	7
10	(Sweden) Anders Henriksson	6
11	(Slovenia) Izak Šantej	5
12	(Australia) Mark Lemon	5
13	(Denmark) Niels Kristian Iversen	5
14	(Hungary) Norbert Magosi	3
15	(Canada) Chris Slabon	3
16	(Finland) Joonas Kylmäkorpi	2

QF (24 May 2002 (Sweden) Vetlanda)
Pos	Rider	Points
1	(England) Lee Richardson	11
2	(Sweden) Stefan Dannö	10
3	(Australia) Jason Lyons	9
4	(Finland) Kai Laukkanen	9
5	(Poland) Andrzej Huszcza	9
6	(Sweden) Henrik Gustafsson	7
7	(Denmark) Ronni Pedersen	7
8	(Norway) Lars Gunnestad	7
9	(United States) Billy Janniro	6
10	(England) Danny Bird	6
11	(Slovenia) Jernej Kolenko	5
12	(Poland) Jacek Rempala	3
13	(Sweden) Niklas Karlsson (R)	3
14	(Latvia) Nikolai Kokin	3
15	(Latvia) Andrzej Korolew	1
16	(Ukraine) Alexander Liatosinskij	0
17	(Sweden) Stefan Andersson	0
18	(Sweden) Freddie Eriksson (R)	0

== Semi finals ==
16 riders from to GP Challenge

SF

- 15 June 2002 (Czech Republic) Mšeno

Pos.	Rider	Points
1	(Czech Republic) Bohumil Brhel	14
2	(Czech Republic) Lukáš Dryml	12
3	(England) Lee Richardson	11
4	(Sweden) Peter Karlsson	11
5	(Denmark) Ronni Pedersen	9
6	(Poland) Tomasz Bajerski	9
7	(Poland) Rafał Okoniewski	8
8	(England) David Howe	8
9	(Poland) Robert Dados	7
10	(Finland) Kai Laukkanen	6
11	(Italy) Andrea Maida (R)	6
12	(England) Paul Hurry	4
13	(United States) Brent Werner (R)	4
14	(Hungary) Róbert Nagy	3
15	(Hungary) Attila Stefáni	3
16	(Slovenia) Matej Žagar	2
17	(Sweden) Stefan Dannö	2
18	(Czech Republic) Antonín Šváb Jr.	1

SF

- 16 June 2002 (Denmark) Holsted

Pos.	Rider	Points
1	(Australia) Jason Lyons	12
2	(Denmark) Bjarne Pedersen	12
3	(Poland) Piotr Protasiewicz	12
4	(Poland) Andrzej Huszcza	10
5	(England) Dean Barker	8
6	(Denmark) Hans Andersen	7
7	(Russia) Roman Povazhny	7
8	(Australia) Steve Johnston	7
9	(Sweden) Peter Ingvar Karlsson	7
10	(Norway) Lars Gunnestad	6
11	(Australia) Craig Watson	6
12	(Russia) Sergej Darkin	6
13	(United States) Ryan Fisher	6
14	(Czech Republic) Aleš Dryml Jr.	5
15	(Denmark) Charlie Gjedde	5
16	(Sweden) Henrik Gustafsson	4

== Final Round ==
=== GP Challenge ===
6 riders to 2003 Grand Prix

- 25 August 2002 (Poland) Piła

Pos.	Rider	Total	Points
1	(England) Lee Richardson	14	3, 2, 3, 3, 3
2	(Czech Republic) Bohumil Brhel	12	3, 3, 3, 0, 3
3	(Poland) Piotr Protasiewicz	11	0, 3, 3, 2, 3
4	(Czech Republic) Lukáš Dryml	11	3, 2, 2, 3, 1
5	(Denmark) Bjarne Pedersen	11	3, 1, 3, 2, 2
6	(Poland) Tomasz Bajerski	11	2, 1, 2, 3, 3
7	(Australia) Jason Lyons	10	2, 2, 1, 3, 2
8	(Denmark) Hans Andersen	9	2, 3, 0, 2, 2
9	(Denmark) Ronni Pedersen	9	0, 3, 2, ex, 0
10	(Sweden) Peter Karlsson	5	2, 1, 2, ex, 1
11	(England) David Howe	4	0, 2, 1, 0, 0, 3
12	(Poland) Robert Dados (R)	4	-, -, 1, 2, 1
13	(Russia) Roman Povazhny	4	1, ef, 1, 1, 1
14	(Poland) Andrzej Huszcza	3	ex, 0, 1, 2, 0
15	(Australia) Steve Johnston	2	1, 0, 0, 1, ef
16	(Poland) Rafał Okoniewski	2	1, 1, 0, -, -
17	(England) Dean Barker	1	1, 0, 0, 0, -

race off for 3rd place - Protasiewicz, Dryml, B Pedersen, Bajerski
