= 2005 Speedway Grand Prix Qualification =

Series of motorcycle speedway races

The 2005 Speedway Grand Prix Qualification or GP Challenge was a series of motorcycle speedway meetings used to determine the 2 riders that would qualify for the 2005 Speedway Grand Prix to join the other 8 riders that finished in the leading positions from the 2004 Speedway Grand Prix and 6 seeded riders.

The system introduced the previous year, that of four quarter finals and two semi-finals was retained but due to the main Grand Prix being reduced from 24 riders to 16 only 2 riders would qualify through the GP Challenge.

Antonio Lindbäck won the GP Challenge.

== Format ==
- First Round (64 riders qualifying from respective national championships)
- Quarter finals – 32 riders to semi-finals
- Semi-finals – 16 riders to GP Challenge
- Final Round – 2 riders from the GP Challenge to the 2005 Grand Prix

== Quarter-finals ==
32 riders to semi-finals

QF (8 May 2004 ITA Terenzano)
| Pos | Rider | Points |
|---|---|---|
| 1 | (Poland) Wiesław Jaguś | 10+3+3 |
| 2 | (Poland) Sebastian Ułamek | 15+3+2 |
| 3 | (Denmark) Niels Kristian Iversen | 13+2+1 |
| 4 | (England) David Norris | 9+2+0 |
| 5 | (England) Stuart Robson | 9+1 |
| 6 | (Denmark) Ronni Pedersen | 8+1 |
| 7 | (Czech Republic) Lukáš Dryml | 10+0 |
| 8 | (Czech Republic) Aleš Dryml Jr. | 9+0 |
| 9 | (Italy) Simone Terenzani | 6 |
| 10 | (Slovenia) Jernej Kolenko | 5 |
| 11 | (Poland) Krzysztof Słaboń | 5 |
| 12 | (Finland) Tommy Reima | 5 |
| 13 | (Finland) Kai Laukkanen | 4 |
| 14 | (Germany) Christian Hefenbrock | 2 |
| 15 | (Germany) Mirko Wolter | 2 |
| 16 | (Italy) Paolo Salvatelli | 1 |

QF (9 May 2004 POL Zielona Góra)
| Pos | Rider | Points |
|---|---|---|
| 1 | (Poland) Jarosław Hampel | 12+2+3 |
| 2 | (Sweden) Antonio Lindbäck | 9+3+2 |
| 3 | (Poland) Janusz Kołodziej | 11+2+1 |
| 4 | (Sweden) Stefan Andersson | 10+3+0 |
| 5 | (Denmark) Hans Andersen | 12+1 |
| 6 | (Russia) Sergej Darkin | 10+1 |
| 7 | (Poland) Jacek Rempala | 12+0 |
| 8 | (Poland) Damian Baliński | 8+0 |
| 9 | (Australia) Mark Lemon | 8 |
| 10 | (Russia) Renat Gafurov | 8 |
| 11 | (England) Leigh Lanham | 7 |
| 12 | (Denmark) Henning Bager | 6 |
| 13 | (England) Chris Harris | 3 |
| 14 | (Latvia) Kjasts Puodžuks | 2 |
| 15 | (Norway) Rune Sola | 2 |
| 16 | (Norway) Mike Bjerk | 0 |

QF (9 May 2004 SVN Krško)
| Pos | Rider | Points |
|---|---|---|
| 1 | (Slovenia) Matej Žagar | 15+2+3 |
| 2 | (Sweden) Niklas Klingberg | 11+3+2 |
| 3 | (Sweden) David Ruud | 11+3+1 |
| 4 | (Netherlands) Theo Pijper | 7+2+0 |
| 5 | (Slovenia) Matej Ferjan | 11+1 |
| 6 | (England) Chris Neath | 11+1 |
| 7 | (Slovenia) Izak Šantej | 11+0 |
| 8 | (Sweden) Peter Ljung | 10+0 |
| 9 | (United States) Ryan Fisher | 7 |
| 10 | (Slovenia) Denis Stoys | 6 |
| 11 | (Denmark) Henrik Møller | 5 |
| 12 | (England) Oliver Allen | 3 |
| 13 | (Slovenia) Primož Legan | 2 |
| 14 | (Croatia) Ivan Vargek | 2 |
| 15 | (Germany) Thomas Stange | 2 |
| 16 | (Denmark) Brian Lyngsö | 1 |
| 17 | (France) Christoph Martin | 1 |

QF (22 May 2004 CZE Slaný)
| Pos | Rider | Points |
|---|---|---|
| 1 | (Czech Republic) Antonín Šváb Jr. | 9+3+3 |
| 2 | (Poland) Tomasz Chrzanowski | 14+3+2 |
| 3 | (Sweden) Stefan Dannö | 11+2+1 |
| 4 | (Hungary) László Szatmári | 8+2+0 |
| 5 | (Germany) Mathias Schultz | 12+1 |
| 6 | (Czech Republic) Josef Franc | 9+1 |
| 7 | (Australia) Craig Watson | 13+0 |
| 8 | (Czech Republic) Tomáš Topinka | 9+0 |
| 9 | (Poland) Sławomir Drabik | 8 |
| 10 | (Austria) Fritz Wallner | 8 |
| 11 | (Germany) Joachim Kugelmann | 6 |
| 12 | (Sweden) Niklas Aspgren | 4 |
| 13 | (Czech Republic) Pavel Ondrašík | 3 |
| 14 | (Austria) Manuel Hauzinger | 1 |
| 15 | (Hungary) Zsolt Bencze | 1 |
| 16 | (Netherlands) Eddie Turksema | 0 |
| 17 | (Czech Republic) Tomáš Suchánek | 0 |

== Semi-finals ==
16 riders from to GP Challenge

SF

- 5 June 2004 ITA Lonigo

| Pos. | Rider | Points |
|---|---|---|
| 1 | (Poland) Wiesław Jaguś | 13 |
| 2 | (Denmark) Hans Andersen | 12 |
| 3 | (Sweden) Antonio Lindbäck | 12 |
| 4 | (Poland) Tomasz Chrzanowski | 11 |
| 5 | (Denmark) Niels Kristian Iversen | 11 |
| 6 | (Poland) Marcin Rempala | 10 |
| 7 | (Czech Republic) Bohumil Brhel | 9 |
| 8 | (Russia) Roman Povazhny | 7 |
| 9 | (England) Stuart Robson | 7 |
| 10 | (Poland) Jacek Rempala | 7 |
| 11 | (Hungary) László Szatmári | 6 |
| 12 | (Italy) Andrea Maida | 5 |
| 13 | (Slovenia) Izak Šantej | 3 |
| 14 | (Sweden) David Ruud | 3 |
| 15 | (England) Chris Neath | 3 |
| 16 | (Czech Republic) Josef Franc | 1 |

SF

- 20 June 2004 BEL Heusden-Zolder

| Pos. | Rider | Points |
|---|---|---|
| 1 | (Sweden) Peter Karlsson | 11+2+3 |
| 2 | (Poland) Sebastian Ułamek | 12+3+2 |
| 3 | (Denmark) Ronni Pedersen | 8+2+1 |
| 4 | (Poland) Damian Baliński | 10+3+0 |
| 5 | (Denmark) Kenneth Bjerre | 10+1 |
| 6 | (England) David Norris | 9+1 |
| 7 | (Australia) Craig Watson | 12+0 |
| 8 | (Sweden) Stefan Andersson | 8+0 |
| 9 | (Sweden) Niklas Klingberg | 8 |
| 10 | (England) David Howe | 7 |
| 11 | (Sweden) Stefan Dannö | 7 |
| 12 | (Slovenia) Matej Ferjan | 6 |
| 13 | (Czech Republic) Lukáš Dryml | 5 |
| 14 | (Poland) Janusz Kołodziej | 5 |
| 15 | NED Theo Pijper | 2 |
| 16 | (Germany) Mathias Schultz | 0 |

== Final Round ==
Hans Andersen was extremely unlucky not to seal a place in the Grand Prix after topping the event with 14 points and then suffering an engine failure in the final.

=== GP Challenge ===
2 riders to 2005 Grand Prix

- 14 August 2004 DEN Vojens

| Pos. | Rider | Total | Points | semi-final | final |
|---|---|---|---|---|---|
| 1 | (Sweden) Antonio Lindbäck | 12 | 2, 3, 3, 2, 2 | 3 | 3 |
| 2 | (Poland) Tomasz Chrzanowski | 10 | 1, 2, 1, 3, 2 | 3 | 2 |
| 3 | (Denmark) Kenneth Bjerre | 7 | 3, 0, 1, 0, 3 | 2 | 1 |
| 4 | (Denmark) Hans Andersen | 14 | 3, 2, 3, 3, 3 | 2 | ef |
| 5 | (Sweden) Stefan Andersson | 8 | 0, 2, 2, 1, 3 | 1 | - |
| 6 | (Sweden) Peter Karlsson | 9 | 3, f, 0, 3, 3 | 1 | - |
| 7 | (Russia) Roman Povazhny | 10 | 3, 3, 2, x, 2 | exc | - |
| 8 | (Poland) Damian Baliński | 10 | 2, 1, 3, 2, 2 | ef | - |
| 9 | (England) David Norris | 7 | 2, 1, 3, exc, 1 | - | - |
| 10 | (Poland) Marcin Rempała | 7 | 0, 3, 1, 2, 1 | - | - |
| 11 | (Czech Republic) Bohumil Brhel | 7 | 1, 1, 2, 3, 0 | - | - |
| 12 | (Denmark) Niels Kristian Iversen | 6 | 1, 3, 0, 1, 1 | - | - |
| 13 | (Sweden) Niklas Klingberg | 6 | 0, 2, 1, 2, 1 | - | - |
| 14 | (Poland) Wiesław Jaguś | 4 | 2, exc, 2, 0, ef | - | - |
| 15 | (Denmark) Ronni Pedersen | 3 | 1, 1, 0, 1, 0 | - | - |
| 16 | (Australia) Craig Watson | 0 | 0, 0, ef, -, – | - | - |
