= Speedway Grand Prix Qualification =

World speedway event

Speedway Grand Prix Challenge
- Current season, competition or edition: 2027 Speedway Grand Prix Qualification
- Sport: motorcycle speedway
- Founded: 1995
- Most recent champion: (United Kingdom) Robert Lambert

The Speedway Grand Prix Challenge or Speedway Grand Prix Qualification is an annual speedway qualifying tournament to determine the qualifiers for the Speedway Grand Prix, which is the World Championship of speedway.

== History ==
From 1995 the Individual World Championship was replaced by the Grand Prix system. The 17 qualifiers for the 1995 Grand Prix were the top 10 from the 1994 World final, 5 seeds and 2 wildcards.

From 1996, the leading riders from each Grand Prix series would automatically qualifying for the following year's event. The remaining places would be filled by the leading riders in the Challenge event and qualifiers from both the Continental Speedway Final and Intercontinental Final. However, the latter two finals would come to end in 2000 and 2001 respectively.

== Format and winners ==
Year	Format	Winner	Other qualifiers
1996	8 to qualify	(Australia) Leigh Adams	(England) Marvyn Cox, (Sweden) Peter Karlsson, (Denmark) Tommy Knudsen, (England) Joe Screen, (England) Gary Havelock, (Australia) Craig Boyce, (England) Andy Smith
1997	4 to qualify	(England) Simon Wigg	(Australia) Leigh Adams, (Sweden) Mikael Karlsson, (England) Andy Smith
1998	4 to qualify	(Poland) Piotr Protasiewicz	(Sweden) Stefan Dannö, (Australia) Leigh Adams, (Australia) Craig Boyce
1999	8 to qualify	(Australia) Leigh Adams	(Denmark) Brian Andersen, (Sweden) Henrik Gustafsson, (England) Andy Smith, (Sweden) Stefan Dannö, (Sweden) Mikael Karlsson, (England) Joe Screen, (Denmark) John Jørgensen
2000	10 to qualify	(United States) Billy Hamill	(Sweden) Mikael Karlsson, (England) Carl Stonehewer, (Denmark) Brian Karger, (Sweden) Henrik Gustafsson, (England) Mark Loram, (England) Andy Smith, (Czech Republic) Antonín Kasper Jr., (Sweden) Peter Karlsson, (Denmark) Brian Andersen
2001	10 to qualify	(Sweden) Peter Karlsson	(England) Carl Stonehewer, (Denmark) Nicki Pedersen, (Norway) Rune Holta, (Sweden) Mikael Karlsson, (Poland) Piotr Protasiewicz, (Sweden) Jimmy Nilsen, (England) Joe Screen, (Denmark) Brian Andersen, (England) Andy Smith
2002	6 to qualify	(United States) Greg Hancock	(Denmark) Nicki Pedersen, (England) Scott Nicholls, (Czech Republic) Lukáš Dryml, (England) Carl Stonehewer, (England) Andy Smith
2003	6 to qualify	(England) Lee Richardson	(Czech Republic) Bohumil Brhel, (Poland) Piotr Protasiewicz, (Czech Republic) Lukáš Dryml, (Denmark) Bjarne Pedersen, (Poland) Tomasz Bajerski
2004	6 to qualify	(Poland) Piotr Protasiewicz	(Czech Republic) Bohumil Brhel, (Denmark) Bjarne Pedersen, (Finland) Kai Laukkanen, (Czech Republic) Aleš Dryml Jr., (Denmark) Jesper B Jensen
2005	2 to qualify	(Sweden) Antonio Lindbäck	(Poland) Tomasz Chrzanowski
2006	No qualifying		
2007	3 to qualify	(Poland) Wiesław Jaguś	(Norway) Rune Holta, (Denmark) Hans Andersen
2008	3 to qualify	(Denmark) Niels Kristian Iversen	(Czech Republic) Lukáš Dryml, (Denmark) Bjarne Pedersen
2009	3 to qualify	(Denmark) Kenneth Bjerre	(Poland) Grzegorz Walasek, (Poland) Sebastian Ułamek
2010	3 to qualify	(Sweden) Magnus Zetterström	(Australia) Chris Holder, (Poland) Jarosław Hampel
2011	3 to qualify	(Russia) Artem Laguta	(Sweden) Antonio Lindbäck, (Sweden) Fredrik Lindgren
2012	3 to qualify	(Sweden) Antonio Lindbäck	(Denmark) Bjarne Pedersen, (Poland) Piotr Protasiewicz
2013	3 to qualify	(Poland) Krzysztof Kasprzak	(Slovenia) Matej Žagar, (Denmark) Niels-Kristian Iversen
2014	3 to qualify	(Denmark) Niels-Kristian Iversen+	(Poland) Krzysztof Kasprzak, (Denmark) Kenneth Bjerre, (Germany) Martin Smolinski
2015	3 to qualify	(Slovenia) Matej Žagar+	(Australia) Jason Doyle, (England) Chris Harris, (Poland) Maciej Janowski
2016	3 to qualify	(Poland) Bartosz Zmarzlik	(Poland) Piotr Pawlicki Jr., (England) Chris Harris
2017	3 to qualify	(Poland) Patryk Dudek	(Slovakia) Martin Vaculík, (Sweden) Fredrik Lindgren
2018	3 to qualify	(Poland) Przemysław Pawlicki	(Russia) Artem Laguta, (England) Craig Cook
2019	3 to qualify	(Poland) Janusz Kołodziej	(Denmark) Niels-Kristian Iversen, (Sweden) Antonio Lindbäck
2020	3 to qualify	(Slovenia) Matej Žagar	(Denmark) Niels-Kristian Iversen, (Australia) Max Fricke
2021	3 to qualify	(Slovenia) Matej Žagar	(Sweden) Oliver Berntzon, (Poland) Krzysztof Kasprzak
2022	3 to qualify	(Poland) Paweł Przedpełski	(Australia) Max Fricke, (Poland) Patryk Dudek
2023	3 to qualify	(Sweden) Kim Nilsson	(Australia) Jack Holder, (Australia) Max Fricke
2024	3 to qualify	(Australia) Jason Doyle	(Slovakia) Martin Vaculik+, (Poland) Szymon Woźniak, (Czech Republic) Jan Kvěch
2025	4 to qualify	(Australia) Brady Kurtz	(Denmark) Anders Thomsen, (Poland) Dominik Kubera, (Australia) Max Fricke
2026	4 to qualify	(Poland) Dominik Kubera	(Poland) Kacper Woryna, (Denmark) Leon Madsen, (Latvia) Andžejs Ļebedevs+, (Denmark) Michael Jepsen Jensen
2027	4 to qualify	(United Kingdom) Robert Lambert	(Australia) Rohan Tungate, (Poland) Kacper Woryna, (Sweden) Kim Nilsson

+ Already qualified for the Grand Prix series

== See also ==
- Motorcycle speedway
- Speedway Grand Prix
