= 2004 Speedway Grand Prix of Slovenia =

Speedway Grand Prix event

- Venue: Matija Gubec Stadium
- Location: Krško, (Slovenia)
- Start date: 4 September 2004
- Competitors: 24 (2 reserves)

The 2004 Speedway Grand Prix of Slovenia was the seventh round of the 2004 Speedway Grand Prix season (the world championship). It took place on 4 September 2004 at the Matija Gubec Stadium in Krško, Slovenia.

It was the third time that the Speedway Grand Prix of Slovenia had been held.

The Grand Prix was by the Swedish rider Tony Rickardsson (his 13th career Grand Prix win).

== Grand Prix result ==
Pos.	Rider	1	2	3	4	5	6	SF1	SF2	Final	GP Points
1	(Sweden) Tony Rickardsson	3	3	3					3	3	25
2	(United States) Greg Hancock	1	2	2	3			2		2	20
3	(Denmark) Hans Andersen	2	2	2				3		1	18
4	(Sweden) Andreas Jonsson	3	1	2	2	2			2	0	16
5	(Australia) Jason Crump	2	3	1	2			1			13
6	(Denmark) Nicki Pedersen	0	2	1	2				1		13
7	(Australia) Leigh Adams	1	3	3				0			11
8	(Denmark) Bjarne Pedersen	3	3	0	2	3			0		11
9	(Slovenia) Matej Žagar	2	0	2	3	0	1				8
10	(Norway) Rune Holta	2	3	2	0	1					8
11	(Sweden) Mikael Max	0	2	3	1	3	0				7
12	(England) Lee Richardson	3	2	0	3	0					7
13	(Poland) Tomasz Gollob	3	1	1							6
14	(Poland) Jarosław Hampel	0	3	3	1	1					6
15	(Poland) Piotr Protasiewicz	2	2	0	0						5
16	(England) Scott Nicholls	0	0	0							5
17	(Czech Republic) Lukáš Dryml	1	2	1							4
18	(Australia) Ryan Sullivan	2	1	1							4
19	(England) Mark Loram	1	3	0							3
20	(Finland) Kai Laukkanen	3	0	0							3
21	(Czech Republic) Bohumil Brhel	0	1								2
22	(Czech Republic) Aleš Dryml Jr.	1	1								2
23	(Denmark) Jesper B. Jensen	1	0								1
24	(Slovenia) Izak Šantej	0	0								1

== Heat by heat ==
- Heat 01 Jonsson, Sullivan, Jensen, Santej
- Heat 02 B Pedersen, Zagar, L Dryml, Max
- Heat 03 Richardson, Protasiewicz, A Dryml, Brhel
- Heat 04 Laukkanen, Holta, Loram, Hampel
- Heat 05 Hampel, Max, A Dryml, Jensen
- Heat 06 Loram, L Dryml, Brhel, Santej
- Heat 07 Holta, Richardson, Jonsson, Zagar
- Heat 08 B Pedersen, Protasiewicz, Sullivan, Laukkanen
- Heat 09 Gollob, Andersen, Hancock, N Pedersen
- Heat 10 Rickardsson, Crump, Adams, Nicholls
- Heat 11 Hampel, Jonsson, L Dryml, Laukkanen
- Heat 12 Max, Zagar, Sullivan, Loram
- Heat 13 Zagar, Holta, Gollob, Nicholls
- Heat 14 Crump, Jonsson, Hancock, B Pedersen
- Heat 15 Adams, Andersen, Max, Richardson
- Heat 16 Rickardsson, N Pedersen, Hampel, Protasiewicz
- Heat 17 Max, B Pedersen, Gollob, Protasiewicz
- Heat 18 Richardson, Hancock, Hampel, Nicholls
- Heat 19 Adams, Jonsson, N Pedersen, Zagar
- Heat 20 Rickardsson, Andersen, Crump, Holta
- Heat 21 Hancock, N Pedersen, Holta, Max
- Heat 22 B Pedersen, Crump, Zagar, Richardson
