= 2004 Speedway Grand Prix of Scandinavia =

Speedway Grand Prix event

- Venue: Ullevi
- Location: Gothenburg, (Sweden)
- Start date: 21 August 2004
- Competitors: 24 (2 reserves)

The 2004 Speedway Grand Prix of Scandinavia was the sixth round of the 2004 Speedway Grand Prix season (the world championship). It took place on 21 August 2004 at the Ullevi in Gothenburg, Sweden.

It was the third time that the Speedway Grand Prix of Scandinavia had been held.

The Grand Prix was by the Danish rider Hans Andersen (his maiden career Grand Prix win).

== Grand Prix result ==
Pos.	Rider	1	2	3	4	5	6	SF1	SF2	Final	GP Points
1	(Denmark) Hans Andersen	3	1	3	2	3		3		3	25
2	(Australia) Jason Crump	3	3	0	2			2		2	20
3	(Sweden) Tony Rickardsson	3	3	2	3				3	1	18
4	(United States) Greg Hancock	1	2	0	2				2	0	16
5	(England) Scott Nicholls	2	2	1	3			1			13
6	(Denmark) Nicki Pedersen	2	3	2	1				1		13
7	(Australia) Leigh Adams	0	3	1	3				0		11
8	(Poland) Tomasz Gollob	3	3	3	2			0			11
9	(Denmark) Bjarne Pedersen	1	1	3	1						8
10	(Sweden) Andreas Jonsson	3	1	2	1						8
11	(England) Lee Richardson	1	3	3	1	3	0				7
12	(Sweden) Peter Karlsson	0	3	2	0	2	0				7
13	(Poland) Jarosław Hampel	2	2	0	1						6
14	(Finland) Kai Laukkanen	3	1	2	1	1					6
15	(Sweden) Mikael Max	0	0	0							5
16	(Poland) Piotr Protasiewicz	2	2	0	0						5
17	(Australia) Ryan Sullivan	2	0	1							4
18	(Denmark) Jesper B. Jensen	2	0	1							4
19	(Czech Republic) Bohumil Brhel	1	2	0							3
20	(Czech Republic) Lukáš Dryml	1	2	0							3
21	(Sweden) Antonio Lindbäck	0	1								2
22	(England) Mark Loram	0	1								2
23	(Czech Republic) Aleš Dryml Jr.	0	0								1
24	(Norway) Rune Holta	1	0								1

== Heat by heat ==
- Heat 01 Rickardsson, Sullivan, Holta, Lindback
- Heat 02 Laukkanen, Hampel, Richardson, Karlsson
- Heat 03 Andersen, Protasiewicz, L Dryml, A Dryml
- Heat 04 Gollob, Jensen, Brhel, Loram
- Heat 05 Karlsson, L Dryml, Loram, Holta
- Heat 06 Richardson, Brhel, Lindback, A Dryml [Ex/2]
- Heat 07 Rickardsson, Hampel, Andersen, Jensen
- Heat 08 Gollob, Protasiewicz, Laukkanen, Sullivan [F/Ex]
- Heat 09 Crump, N Pedersen, B Pedersen, Adams
- Heat 10 Jonsson, Nicholls, Hancock, Max
- Heat 11 Andersen, Karlsson, Sullivan, Brhel
- Heat 12 Richardson, Laukkanen, Jensen, L Dryml
- Heat 13 Crump, Rickardsson, Laukkanen, Max [Ex/T]
- Heat 14 Gollob, Nicholls, B Pedersen, Karlsson
- Heat 15 N Pedersen, Hancock, Richardson, Hampel
- Heat 16 Adams, Andersen, Jonsson, Protasiewicz
- Heat 17 Richardson, Karlsson, Laukkanen, Protasiewicz
- Heat 18 B Pedersen, Jonsson, Hampel, Max
- Heat 19 Andersen, N Pedersen, Nicholls, Crump [Ex]
- Heat 20 Rickardsson, Gollob, Adams, Hancock
- Heat 21 Nicholls, Hancock, Jonsson, Richardson
- Heat 22 Adams, Crump, B Pedersen, Karlsson
