= 2004 Speedway Grand Prix of Poland =

Speedway Grand Prix event

- Venue: Polonia Stadium
- Location: Bydgoszcz, (Poland)
- Start date: 18 September 2004
- Competitors: 24 (2 reserves)

The 2004 Speedway Grand Prix of Poland was the eighth round of the 2004 Speedway Grand Prix season (the world championship). It took place on 18 September 2004 at the Polonia Stadium in Bydgoszcz, Poland.

It was the 11th time that the Speedway Grand Prix of Poland had been held.

Polish rider Tomasz Gollob won the Grand Prix (his 9th career Grand Prix win and the 6th time that Gollob had won the Polish Grand Prix).

== Grand Prix result ==
Pos.	Rider	1	2	3	4	5	6	SF1	SF2	Final	GP Points
1	(Poland) Tomasz Gollob	3	3	2	1	3		3		3	25
2	(Australia) Jason Crump	2	3	3					3	2	20
3	(Sweden) Tony Rickardsson	3	3	2					2	1	18
4	(Norway) Rune Holta	2	2	2	3			2		0	16
5	(Australia) Leigh Adams	1	3	0	2			1			13
6	(Poland) Jarosław Hampel	2	3	2	1	3			1		13
7	(Denmark) Nicki Pedersen	0	3	2				0			11
8	(England) Scott Nicholls	2	1	3	0	2	2		0		11
9	(Sweden) Andreas Jonsson	2	2	0	1						8
10	(Denmark) Hans Andersen	3	0	2	1						8
11	(England) Lee Richardson	3	2	1	3	0					7
12	(Poland) Piotr Protasiewicz	1	3	2	0	3	0				7
13	(United States) Greg Hancock	0	1	1							6
14	(Australia) Ryan Sullivan	1	3	2	1	1					6
15	(Denmark) Bjarne Pedersen	1	0	0							5
16	(Czech Republic) Aleš Dryml Jr.	1	2	3	1	0					5
17	(Sweden) Mikael Max	3	0	1							4
18	(England) Mark Loram	2	0	1							4
19	(Poland) Krzysztof Kasprzak	3	1	0							3
20	(Finland) Kai Laukkanen	1	2	0							3
21	(Poland) Tomasz Chrzanowski	0	1								2
22	(Denmark) Jesper B. Jensen	0	1								2
23	(Czech Republic) Bohumil Brhel	0	0								1
24	(Czech Republic) Lukáš Dryml	0	0								1

== Heat by heat ==
- Heat 01 Kasprzak, Holta, Sullivan, L Dryml
- Heat 02 Max, Loram, Protasiewicz, Chrzanowski
- Heat 03 Richardson, Nicholls, Laukkanen, Jensen
- Heat 04 Gollob, Hampel, A Dryml, Brhel
- Heat 05 Sullivan, Laukkanen, Chrzanowski, Brhel
- Heat 06 Protasiewicz, A Dryml, Jensen, L Dryml
- Heat 07 Hampel, Richardson, Kasprzak, Loram
- Heat 08 Gollob, Holta, Nicholls, Max
- Heat 09 Rickardsson, Jonsson, B Pedersen, N Pedersen
- Heat 10 Andersen, Crump, Adams, Hancock
- Heat 11 A Dryml, Sullivan, Max, Kasprzak
- Heat 12 Nicholls, Protasiewicz, Loram, Laukkanen
- Heat 13 Rickardsson, Hampel, Hancock, Protasiewicz
- Heat 14 Crump, Gollob, Sullivan, B Pedersen [F/Ex]
- Heat 15 Adams, Jonsson, Richardson, Nicholls
- Heat 16 N Pedersen, Holta, A Dryml, Andersen
- Heat 17 Richardson, Andersen, Hancock, B Pedersen
- Heat 18 Protasiewicz, Nicholls, Sullivan, A Dryml
- Heat 19 Holta, Rickardsson, Gollob, Adams
- Heat 20 Crump, N Pedersen, Hampel, Jonsson
- Heat 21 Gollob, Nicholls, Jonsson, Richardson
- Heat 22 Hampel, Adams, Andersen, Protasiewicz
