= 2004 Speedway Grand Prix of Denmark =

Speedway Grand Prix event

- Venue: Parken Stadium
- Location: Copenhagen, (Denmark)
- Start date: 26 June 2004
- Competitors: 24 (2 reserves)

The 2004 Speedway Grand Prix of Denmark was the fifth round of the 2004 Speedway Grand Prix season (the world championship). It took place on 26 June 2004 at the Parken Stadium in Copenhagen, Denmark.

It was the 10th time that the Speedway Grand Prix of Denmark had been held.

The Grand Prix was by Australian rider Jason Crump (his 10th career Grand Prix win)

== Grand Prix result ==
Pos.	Rider	1	2	3	4	5	6	SF1	SF2	Final	GP Points
1	(Australia) Jason Crump	1	2	2					3	3	25
2	(Sweden) Andreas Jonsson	3	3	2				2		2	20
3	(United States) Greg Hancock	2	3	3				3		1	18
4	(Denmark) Nicki Pedersen	3	3	0	3				2	0	16
5	(Denmark) Niels-Kristian Iversen	3	2	2	1	3		1			13
6	(Denmark) Kenneth Bjerre	2	3	0	3	2			1		13
7	(Australia) Leigh Adams	2	3	3					0		11
8	(England) Scott Nicholls	0	0	2	2			0			11
9	(Denmark) Bjarne Pedersen	2	2	0	3	1					8
10	(Sweden) Mikael Max	1	2	3	1	2	1				8
11	(Sweden) Tony Rickardsson	3	3	2	0	0					7
12	(Denmark) Hans Andersen	0	3	3	2	0	0				7
13	(Poland) Tomasz Gollob	1	1	1							6
14	(Denmark) Jesper B. Jensen	3	1	2	1	1					6
15	(England) Lee Richardson	0	1	0							5
16	(Poland) Piotr Protasiewicz	1	2	2	0	0					5
17	(Australia) Ryan Sullivan	2	0	1							4
18	(Norway) Rune Holta	2	0	1							4
19	(Finland) Kai Laukkanen	3	1	0							3
20	(Czech Republic) Aleš Dryml Jr.	0	3	0							3
21	(England) Mark Loram	1	1								2
22	(Czech Republic) Bohumil Brhel	1	1								2
23	(Czech Republic) Lukáš Dryml	0	0	1							1
24	(England) Simon Stead	0	0								1

== Heat by heat ==
- Heat 01 Rickardsson, Bjerre, Brhel, Andersen
- Heat 02 N-K Iversen, Sullivan, Loram, A Dryml
- Heat 03 Jensen, Holta, Protasiewicz, L Dryml
- Heat 04 Laukkanen, B Pedersen, Max, Stead
- Heat 05 A Dryml, Protasiewicz, Brhel, Stead
- Heat 06 Andersen, Max, Loram, L Dryml
- Heat 07 Rickardsson, B Pedersen, Jensen, Sullivan
- Heat 08 Bjerre, Iversen, Laukkanen, Holta
- Heat 09 N Pedersen, Hancock, Crump, Nicholls
- Heat 10 Jonsson, Adams, Gollob, Richardson
- Heat 11 Max, Jensen, Holta, A Dryml
- Heat 12 Andersen, Protasiewicz, Sullivan, Laukkanen
- Heat 13 N Pedersen, Rickardsson, Richardson, Protasiewicz
- Heat 14 Adams, Crump, Jensen, Bjerre
- Heat 15 Hancock, Andersen, Gollob, B Pedersen
- Heat 16 Jonsson, Iversen, Max, Nicholls [F/Ex]
- Heat 17 Bjerre, Nicholls, Gollob, Richardson [Ex]
- Heat 18 B Pedersen, Max, Jensen, Protasiewicz
- Heat 19 Hancock, Crump, Iversen, N Pedersen [Ex]
- Heat 20 Adams, Jonsson, Andersen [F/Ex], Rickardsson [F/Ex]
- Heat 21 Iversen, Bjerre, Max, Rickardsson
- Heat 22 N Pedersen, Nicholls, B Pedersen, Andersen
