= 2004 Speedway Grand Prix of Europe =

Speedway Grand Prix event

- Venue: Olympic Stadium
- Location: Wrocław, (Poland)
- Start date: 29 May 2004
- Competitors: 24 (2 reserves)

The 2004 Speedway Grand Prix of Europe was the third round of the 2004 Speedway Grand Prix season (the world championship). It took place on 29 May 2004 at the Olympic Stadium in Wrocław, Poland.

It was the fourth time that the Speedway Grand Prix of Europe had been held.

The Grand Prix was by the Danish rider Bjarne Pedersen (his maiden career Grand Prix win).

== Grand Prix result ==
Pos.	Rider	1	2	3	4	5	6	SF1	SF2	Final	GP Points
1	(Denmark) Bjarne Pedersen	3	2	2	2			2		3	25
2	(Poland) Jarosław Hampel	2	3	3					3	2	20
3	(Sweden) Tony Rickardsson	1	3	0	3				2	1	18
4	(Poland) Piotr Protasiewicz	2	1	2	2	1	3	3		0	16
5	(Denmark) Nicki Pedersen	1	3	3	2	2			1		13
6	(Poland) Grzegorz Walasek	2	0	2	3	3		1			13
7	(Australia) Ryan Sullivan	1	0	2	2			0			11
8	(Australia) Leigh Adams	0	1	2	2				0		11
9	(Australia) Jason Crump	3	2	0	1						8
10	(United States) Greg Hancock	0	0	3	1						8
11	(Poland) Tomasz Gollob	3	3	1	1						7
12	(Sweden) Andreas Jonsson	3	3	1	3						7
13	(England) Mark Loram	2	2	0	1						6
14	(Sweden) Mikael Max	3	3	1	1						6
15	(Czech Republic) Bohumil Brhel	3	1	3	0	0					5
16	(England) Lee Richardson	2	1	0							5
17	(England) Scott Nicholls	0	2	1							4
18	(Poland) Wiesław Jaguś	0	3	1							4
19	(Denmark) Hans Andersen	1	2	0							3
20	(Finland) Kai Laukkanen	2	0	0							3
21	(Czech Republic) Lukáš Dryml	0	1								2
22	(Denmark) Jesper B. Jensen	1	1								2
23	(Czech Republic) Aleš Dryml Jr.	1	0								1
24	(Norway) Rune Holta	0	0								1

== Heat by heat ==
- Heat 01 B Pedersen, Loram, N Pedersen, Jagus
- Heat 02 Max, Walasek, Jensen, Holta
- Heat 03 Jonsson, Laukkanen, Andersen, Nicholls
- Heat 04 Brhel, Protasiewicz, A Dryml, L Dryml
- Heat 05 N Pedersen, Andersen, L Dryml, Holta [F/Ex]
- Heat 06 Jagus, Nicholls, Jensen, A Dryml
- Heat 07 Jonsson, B Pedersen, Protasiewicz, Walasek
- Heat 08 Max, Loram, Brhel, Laukkanen
- Heat 09 Crump, Richardson, Sullivan, Adams [E/F]
- Heat 10 Gollob, Hampel, Rickardsson, Hancock
- Heat 11 N Pedersen, Protasiewicz, Nicholls, Laukkanen
- Heat 12 Brhel, Walasek, Jagus, Andersen
- Heat 13 Walasek, Crump, Jonsson, Hancock [E/F]
- Heat 14 Hampel, Protasiewicz, Max, Sullivan
- Heat 15 Rickardsson, B Pedersen, Richardson, Brhel
- Heat 16 Gollob, N Pedersen, Adams, Loram
- Heat 17 Jonsson, Sullivan, Loram, Richardson
- Heat 18 Hancock, Adams, Max, Brhel [E/F]
- Heat 19 Walasek, N Pedersen, Protasiewicz, Rickardsson [F/Ret]
- Heat 20 Hampel, B Pedersen, Gollob, Crump
- Heat 21 Protasiewicz, Adams, Crump, Jonsson
- Heat 22 Rickardsson, Sullivan, Hancock, Gollob [E/F]
