= 2008 Speedway Grand Prix Qualification =

Seasons
- ← 2007 2009 →

The 2008 Speedway Grand Prix Qualification or GP Challenge was a series of motorcycle speedway meetings used to determine the 3 riders that would qualify for the 2008 Speedway Grand Prix.

== Calendar ==
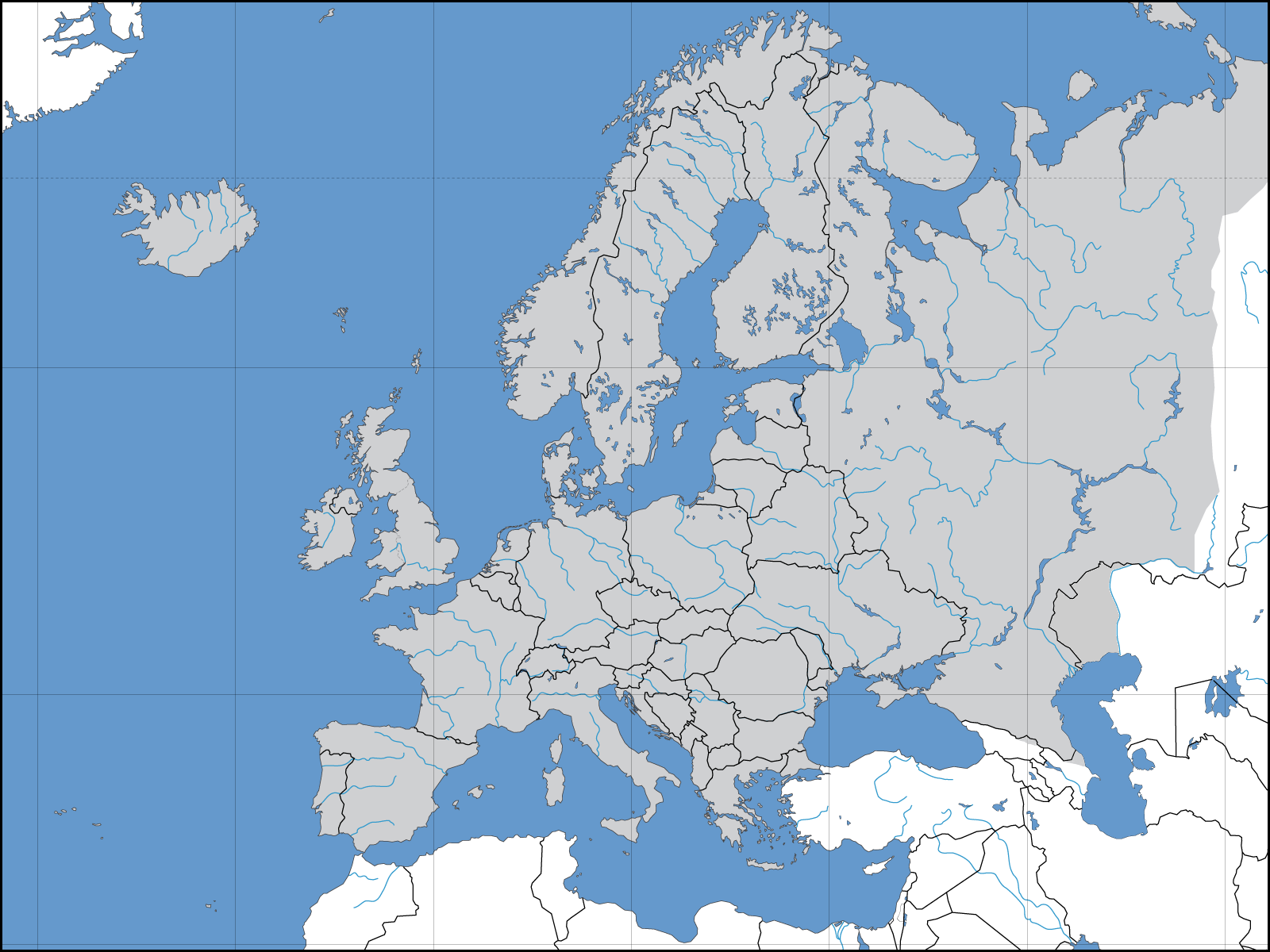

- Domestic - Quarter-finals - Semi-finals - Final

| Date (2007) | Venue | Winner | |
Domestic Qualification
| June 6 | (Poland) Bydgoszcz | (Poland) Grzegorz Walasek | result |
Quarter-finals
| June 23 | (Italy) Terenzano | (Denmark) Niels Kristian Iversen | result |
| June 24 | (Hungary) Miskolc | (Australia) Rory Schlein | result |
| June 23 | (Czech Republic) Mšeno | (Poland) Krzysztof Kasprzak | result |
| June 30 | (Sweden) Motala | (Poland) Damian Baliński | result |
Semi-finals
| July 7 | (Italy) Lonigo | (Denmark) Bjarne Pedersen | result |
| July 8 | (Slovenia) Ljubljana | (Sweden) Fredrik Lindgren | result |
Final
| 15 September | (Denmark) Vojens | (Denmark) Niels Kristian Iversen | result |

== Domestic Qualification ==
=== Poland ===
- Golden Helmet Final (Finał Złotego Kasku)
- June 6, 2007
- (Poland) Bydgoszcz, Polonia Stadium
- Referee: (Poland) Ryszard Bryła (Zielona Góra)
- Attendance: 2,500
- Best Time: 61,63 s. - Wiesław Jaguś (7 heat)
- Only 16 heats, because was rain.

| Pos. | Rider | Points | Heats |
|---|---|---|---|
| 1 | Grzegorz Walasek Zielona Góra | 9 | (0,3,3,3) |
| 2 | Rafał Dobrucki Rzeszów | 9 | (2,1,3,3) |
| 3 | Krzysztof Kasprzak Leszno | 9 | (3,2,2,2) |
| 4 | Paweł Hlib Gorzów Wlkp. | 8 | (3,1,1,3) |
| 5 | Piotr Protasiewicz Zielona Góra | 7 | (3,1,3,F) |
| 6 | Jarosław Hampel Leszno | 7 | (2,2,E,3) |
| 7 | Damian Baliński Leszno | 7 | (1,3,2,1) |
| 10 | Tomasz Gapiński Wrocław | 6 | (2,0,2,2) |

Paweł Hlib was injured before Quarter-Final and was replaced by Tomasz Gapiński. Wiesław Jaguś (8th) and Sebastian Ułamek (9th) refused.

== Quarter-finals ==
Terenzano

- Qualifying round A
- June 23, 2007
- (Italy) Terenzano
- Referee: ?
- Attendance: ?
- Best Time: ?
- No12: (Sweden) Sebastian Aldén → Marco Gregnanin

| Pos. | Rider | Points | Heats |
|---|---|---|---|
| 1 | (Denmark) (10) Niels Kristian Iversen | 15 | (3,3,3,3,3) |
| 2 | (Croatia) (6) Jurica Pavlič | 12+3 | (1,2,3,3,3) |
| 3 | (Poland) (14) Rafał Dobrucki | 12+2 | (2,1,3,3,3) |
| 4 | (United Kingdom) (7) Richard Hall | 12+F/X | (2,3,2,2,3) |
| 5 | (Canada) (16) Kyle Legault | 11 | (3,2,2,2,2) |
| 6 | (Sweden) (2) Niklas Klingberg | 10 | (3,0,3,3,1) |
| 7 | (Australia) (5) Steve Johnston | 10 | (3,2,1,2,2) |
| 8 | (United Kingdom) (11) David Howe | 8+3 | (2,1,2,2,1) |
| 9 | (Denmark) (13) Henrik Møller | 8+2 | (1,3,1,1,2) |
| 10 | (Slovenia) (9) Matej Ferjan | 5 | (0,1,1,1,2) |
| 11 | (Italy) (16) Andrea Maida | 4 | (0,3,1,0,0) |
| 12 | (Slovenia) (8) Denis Štojs | 3 | (0,1,2,0,F) |
| 13 | (Italy) (3) Guglielmo Franchetti | 3 | (2,F,0,1,0) |
| 14 | (Czech Republic) (4) Josef Franc | 3 | (1,2,E,0,0) |
| 15 | (Italy) (12) Marco Gregnanin | 3 | (1,0,0,1,1) |
| 16 | (Slovenia) (1) Maks Gregorič | 1 | (0,0,0,0,1) |

Miskolc

- Qualifying round B
- June 24, 2007
- (Hungary) Miskolc
- Referee: ?
- Attendance: ?
- Best Time: ?

| Pos. | Rider | Points | Heats |
|---|---|---|---|
| 1 | (Australia) (9) Rory Schlein | 14 | (3,3,2,3,3) |
| 2 | (Poland) (16) Piotr Protasiewicz | 12+3 | (3,3,2,3,1) |
| 3 | (Denmark) (7) Charlie Gjedde | 12+2 | (3,2,2,3,2) |
| 4 | (Poland) (12) Sebastian Ułamek | 10 | (2,1,3,1,3) |
| 5 | (Australia) (14) Chris Holder | 10 | (2,3,1,2,2) |
| 6 | (Russia) (8) Denis Gizatullin | 9 | (2,2,3,2,E) |
| 7 | (Czech Republic) (11) Luboš Tomíček, Jr. | 8+3 | (E,3,1,1,3) |
| 8 | (Czech Republic) (2) Zdeněk Simota | 8+2 | (1,2,2,3,0) |
| 9 | (Hungary) (6) Norbert Magosi | 7 | (1,0,3,1,2) |
| 10 | (Finland) (15) Joonas Kylmäkorpi | 7 | (1,1,1,2,2) |
| 11 | (Hungary) (1) Jozsef Tabaka | 6 | (3,X,0,0,3) |
| 12 | (Russia) (13) Ruslan Gatiatow | 5 | (0,2,3,0,0) |
| 13 | (Latvia) (3) Maksims Bogdanovs | 5 | (2,0,0,2,1) |
| 14 | (Latvia) (10) Kasts Poudzuks | 5 | (1,1,1,1,1) |
| 15 | (Sweden) (4) Magnus Karlsson | 1 | (0,0,0,0,1) |
| 16 | (Ukraine) (5) Jaroslaw Poljuchowicz | 1 | (0,1,0,0,0) |
| - | (Hungary) (R1) Zsolt Bencze | | |

Mšeno

- Qualifying round C
- June 23, 2007
- (Czech Republic) Mšeno
- Referee: ?
- Attendance: ?
- Best Time: ?
- No13: (Russia) Denis Sajfutdinov → Martin Vaculík

| Pos. | Rider | Points | Heats |
|---|---|---|---|
| 1 | (Poland) (4) Krzysztof Kasprzak | 15 | (3,3,3,3,3) |
| 2 | (Russia) (10) Renat Gafurov | 13 | (3,3,2,2,3) |
| 3 | (Czech Republic) (5) Aleš Dryml, Jr. | 11 | (3,2,1,3,2) |
| 4 | (Germany) (7) Tobias Kroner | 10 | (2,2,1,2,3) |
| 5 | (Slovenia) (11) Izak Šantej | 9 | (E,3,3,3,0) |
| 6 | (Poland) (15) Jarosław Hampel | 9 | (3,E,2,2,2) |
| 7 | (Czech Republic) (12) Lukáš Dryml | 8+3 | (E,2,3,3,F) |
| 8 | (United Kingdom) (14) Lewis Bridger | 8+2 | (2,2,2,1,1) |
| 9 | (United Kingdom) (9) Daniel King | 8+1 | (2,1,3,1,1) |
| 10 | (Czech Republic) (1) Adrian Rymel | 6 | (2,3,0,0,1) |
| 11 | (Slovakia) (13) Martin Vaculík | 6 | (1,0,0,2,3) |
| 12 | (Germany) (16) Thomas Stange | 6 | (0,1,2,1,2) |
| 13 | (Czech Republic) (17) Hynek Štichauer | 3 | (1,2) |
| 14 | (Netherlands) (3) Henk Bos | 3 | (0,1,1,0,1) |
| 15 | (Austria) (2) Fritz Wallner | 3 | (1,1,E,1,E) |
| 16 | (Netherlands) (8) Kaj de Jong | 1 | (1,0,0,0,0) |
| - | (Austria) (6) Manuel Hauzinger | 0 | (E,0,-,-,-) |
| - | (Czech Republic) (18) Richard Wolff | 0 | (0) |
17: Heats: ? 18: Heat: ?

Motala

- Qualifying round D
- June 30, 2007
- (Sweden) Motala
- Referee: ?
- Attendance: ?
- Best Time: ?
- No5: (Norway) Carl Johan Raugstad → Daniel Davidsson

| Pos. | Rider | Points | Heats |
|---|---|---|---|
| 1 | (Poland) (4) Damian Baliński | 12+3 | (1,3,3,2,3) |
| 2 | (Denmark) (8) Kenneth Bjerre | 12+2 | (3,1,3,2,3) |
| 3 | (Sweden) (3) Mikael Max | 12+1 | (3,3,2,3,1) |
| 4 | (Poland) (14) Tomasz Gapiński | 11 | (2,3,1,3,2) |
| 5 | (Sweden) (16) Fredrik Lindgren | 11 | (1,2,3,2,3) |
| 6 | (Finland) (6) Kai Laukkanen | 11 | (2,2,1,3,3) |
| 7 | (Sweden) (13) Jonas Davidsson | 10 | (0,3,2,3,2) |
| 8 | (Finland) (15) Kauko Nieminen | 9 | (3,1,2,1,2) |
| 9 | (Denmark) (11) Jesper B. Jensen | 8 | (3,2,2,1,E) |
| 10 | (United Kingdom) (12) Simon Stead | 6 | (1,0,3,2,0) |
| 11 | (Germany) (10) Martin Smolinski | 6 | (2,1,1,1,1) |
| 12 | (Germany) (1) Christian Hefenbrock | 5 | (2,2,0,1,0) |
| 13 | (Sweden) (5) Daniel Davidsson | 3 | (0,1,0,0,2) |
| 14 | (United Kingdom) (2) Oliver Allen | 2 | (0,0,1,0,1) |
| 15 | (Norway) (9) Rune Sola | 2 | (1,0,0,0,1) |
| 16 | (United States) (7) Matt Browne | 0 | (0,0,0,0,0) |
| - | (Sweden) (17) Ricky Kling | | |

== Semi-finals ==
Lonigo

- Semi-final A
- July 7, 2007
- (Italy) Lonigo
- Referee: ?
- Attendance: ?
- Best Time: ?

| Pos. | Rider | Points | Heats |
|---|---|---|---|
| 1 | (Denmark) (7) Bjarne Pedersen | 11+3 | (3,2,2,3,1) |
| 2 | (Poland) (4) Krzysztof Kasprzak | 11+2 | (2,3,0,3,3) |
| 3 | (Poland) (14) Damian Baliński | 10+3 | (3,3,2,2,0) |
| 4 | (Russia) (10) Denis Gizatullin | 10+2 | (3,1,3,1,2) |
| 5 | (Germany) (12) Tobias Kroner | 10+1 | (2,2,3,1,2) |
| 6 | (Czech Republic) (1) Lukáš Dryml | 9 | (3,X,3,X,3) |
| 7 | (Canada) (2) Kyle Legault | 8+3 | (1,2,2,3,0) |
| 8 | (Australia) (9) Steve Johnston | 8+2 | (0,2,1,2,3) |
| 9 | (Denmark) (11) Charlie Gjedde | 8+1 | (1,3,1,2,1) |
| 10 | (Australia) (3) Chris Holder | 7 | (F,1,0,3,3) |
| 11 | (Poland) (8) Jarosław Hampel | 7 | (2,0,3,1,1) |
| 12 | (Croatia) (16) Jurica Pavlič | 7 | (2,1,0,2,2) |
| 13 | (Sweden) (5) Mikael Max | 6 | (0,3,1,0,2) |
| 14 | (Poland) (6) Tomasz Gapiński | 4 | (1,0,2,E,1) |
| 15 | (United Kingdom) (15) Richard Hall | 2 | (1,0,F,1,0) |
| 16 | (Czech Republic) (18) Zdeněk Simota | 1 | (E,1,0,0) |
| 17 | (Italy) (13) Mattia Carpanese | 0 | (0,F/-,-,-,-) |
| 18 | (United Kingdom) (17) David Howe | 0 | (F/-) |
17: Heat: 5; 18: Heats: 5, 12, 14 and 19: Heat 5: Carpanese fell (injury); replaced by Howe.; Howe fell by Dryml (injury); Dryml was exclusion; Howe replaced by Simota.

Ljubljana

- Semi-final B
- July 8, 2007
- (Slovenia) Ljubljana
- Referee: ?
- Attendance: ?
- Best Time: ?

| Pos. | Rider | Points | Heats |
|---|---|---|---|
| 1 | (Sweden) (16) Fredrik Lindgren | 11+3 | (2,1,2,3,3) |
| 2 | (Russia) (4) Renat Gafurov | 11+2 | (1,3,1,3,3) |
| 3 | (Denmark) (10) Kenneth Bjerre | 11+1 | (3,3,3,2,0) |
| 4 | (Australia) (15) Rory Schlein | 10 | (3,2,3,1,1) |
| 5 | (Denmark) (8) Niels Kristian Iversen | 10 | (1,2,3,2,2) |
| 6 | (Poland) (1) Rafał Dobrucki | 9 | (3,2,1,0,3) |
| 7 | (Sweden) (7) Jonas Davidsson | 8+3 | (3,1,E3,3,1) |
| 8 | (Czech Republic) (12) Luboš Tomíček, Jr. | 8+2 | (2,0,2,2,2) |
| 9 | (Poland) (13) Piotr Protasiewicz | 8+1 | (0,3,2,F/X,3) |
| 10 | (Poland) (6) Grzegorz Walasek | 7 | (2,1,3,0,1) |
| 11 | (Sweden) (9) Niklas Klingberg | 7 | (1,0,2,2,2) |
| 12 | (Finland) (14) Kai Laukkanen | 6 | (1,2,1,1,1) |
| 13 | (Slovenia) (2) Jernej Kolenko | 5 | (2,0,0,3,0) |
| 14 | (Poland) (11) Sebastian Ułamek | 4 | (0,3,0,1,0) |
| 15 | (Slovenia) (5) Izak Šantej | 4 | (0,1,1,0,2) |
| 16 | (Czech Republic) (3) Aleš Dryml, Jr. | 1 | (E4,0,0,1,T/-) |
| 17 | (Finland) (17) Kauko Nieminen | 0 | (0) |
| - | (United Kingdom) (18) Lewis Bridger | | |
17: Heat: 19

== Grand Prix Challenge ==
- September 15, 2007 (Saturday, 19:30)
- (Denmark) Vojens
- Referee:
- Jury President:
- Attendance:
- Best Time:
- Stadium and track:
  - Name: Vojens Speedway Center

| Placing | Rider | Total | 1 | 2 | 3 | 4 | 5 | 6 | 7 | 8 | 9 | 10 | 11 | 12 | 13 | 14 | 15 | 16 | 17 | 18 | 19 | 20 | Pts | Pos | 21 |
|---|---|---|---|---|---|---|---|---|---|---|---|---|---|---|---|---|---|---|---|---|---|---|---|---|---|
| 1 | (Denmark) (8) Niels Kristian Iversen | 14 | | 3 | | | | | | 3 | | | 3 | | | 3 | | | 2 | | | | 14 | 1 | |
| 2 | (Czech Republic) (6) Lukáš Dryml | 12 | | 1 | | | | 3 | | | 2 | | | | | | | 3 | | | 3 | | 12 | 2 | |
| 3 | (Denmark) (4) Bjarne Pedersen | 11 | 3 | | | | | | | 1 | | | | 3 | | | | 1 | | | | 3 | 11 | 3 | 3 |
| 4 | (Czech Republic) (12) Luboš Tomíček, Jr. | 11 | | | 3 | | | | | 2 | | 2 | | | 3 | | | | | | 1 | | 11 | 4 | 2 |
| 5 | (Denmark) (5) Kenneth Bjerre | 10 | | 2 | | | 3 | | | | | 3 | | | | | X | | | | | 2 | 10 | 5 | |
| 6 | (Poland) (11) Rafał Dobrucki | 10 | | | 1 | | | | 3 | | 3 | | | | | 2 | | | | | | 1 | 10 | 6 | |
| 7 | (Sweden) (3) Jonas Davidsson | 8 | 0 | | | | | | 2 | | | | 1 | | | | 3 | | | | 2 | | 8 | 7 | |
| 8 | (Poland) (15) Krzysztof Kasprzak | 8 | | | | 1 | | | 1 | | | 1 | | | | | | 2 | 3 | | | | 8 | 8 | |
| 9 | (Russia) (14) Renat Gafurov | 7 | | | | 3 | | 2 | | | | | 0 | | 2 | | | | | | | 0 | 7 | 9 | |
| 10 | (Sweden) (10) Fredrik Lindgren | 7 | | | 2 | | | 1 | | | | | | 2 | | | 2 | | X | | | | 7 | 10 | |
| 11 | (Russia) (16) Denis Gizatullin | 6 | | | | 2 | | | | 0 | 0 | | | | | | 1 | | | 3 | | | 6 | 11 | |
| 12 | (Poland) (1) Damian Baliński | 5 | 2 | | | | 2 | | | | 1 | | | | E | | | | - | | | | 5 | 12 | |
| 13 | (Australia) (7) Rory Schlein | 4 | | 0 | | | | | 0 | | | | | 1 | 1 | | | | | 2 | | | 4 | 13 | |
| 14 | (Australia) (9) Steve Johnston | 3 | | | 0 | | 1 | | | | | | 2 | | | | | 0 | | 0 | | | 3 | 14 | |
| 15 | (Germany) (2) Tobias Kroner | 2 | 1 | | | | | 0 | | | | 0 | | | | E | | | | 1 | | | 2 | 15 | |
| 16 | (Canada) (13) Kyle Legault | 1 | | | | X | 0 | | | | | | | 0 | | 1 | | | | | 0 | | 1 | 16 | |
| 17 | (Denmark) (17) Charlie Gjedde | 1 | | | | | | | | | | | | | | | | | 1 | | | | 1 | 17 | |
| Placing | Rider | Total | 1 | 2 | 3 | 4 | 5 | 6 | 7 | 8 | 9 | 10 | 11 | 12 | 13 | 14 | 15 | 16 | 17 | 18 | 19 | 20 | Pts | Pos | 21 |

m - exclusion for exceeding two minute time allowance • t - exclusion for touching the tapes • x - other exclusion • e - retired or mechanical failure • f - fell • ns - non-starter • nc - non-classify

| gate A - inside | gate B | gate C | gate D - outside |

=== Heat after heat ===
1. Pedersen, Baliński, Kroner, Davidsson
2. Iversen, Bjerre, Dryml, Schlein
3. Tomíček, Lindgren, Dobrucki, Johnston
4. Gafurov, Gizatullin, Kasprzak, Legault (F/X)
5. Bjerre, Baliński, Johnston, Legault
6. Dryml, Gafurov, Lindgren, Kroner
7. Dobrucki, Davidsson, Kasprzak, Schlein
8. Iversen, Tomíček, Pedersen, Gizatullin
9. Dobrucki, Dryml, Baliński, Gizatullin
10. Bjerre, Tomíček, Kasprzak, Kroner
11. Iversen, Johnston, Davidsson, Gafurov
12. Pedersen, Lindgren, Schlein, Legault
13. Tomíček, Gafurov, Schlein, Baliński (E/start)
14. Iversen, Dobrucki, Legault, Kroner (E4)
15. Davidsson, Lindgren, Gizatullin, Bjerre (F/X)
16. Dryml, Kasprzak, Pedersen, Johnston
17. Kasprzak, Iversen, Gjedde, Lindgren (F/X)
18. Gizatullin, Schlein, Kroner, Johnston
19. Dryml, Davidsson, Tomíček, Legault
20. Pedersen, Bjerre, Dobrucki, Gafurov
  Play-off 3-4 place:
21. Pedersen, Tomíček

Top three riders qualified to 2008 Speedway Grand Prix:

1. (Denmark) Niels Kristian Iversen
2. (Czech Republic) Lukáš Dryml
3. (Denmark) Bjarne Pedersen

== See also ==
- Speedway Grand Prix
