= 2004 Speedway Grand Prix of Norway =

Speedway Grand Prix event

- Venue: Vikingskipet
- Location: Hamar, (Norway)
- Start date: 2 October 2004
- Competitors: 24 (2 reserves)

The 2004 Speedway Grand Prix of Norway was the ninth and final round of the 2004 Speedway Grand Prix season (the world championship). It took place on 2 October 2004 at the Vikingskipet in Hamar, Norway.

It was the third and last time that the Speedway Grand Prix of Norway had been held.

Swedish rider Tony Rickardsson won the Grand Prix (his 14th career Grand Prix win).

== Grand Prix result ==
Pos.	Rider	1	2	3	4	5	6	SF1	SF2	Final	GP Points
1	(Sweden) Tony Rickardsson	3	3	0	3			3		3	25
2	(United States) Greg Hancock	3	3	0	3	2			2	2	20
3	(Poland) Tomasz Gollob	1	3	2				2		1	18
4	(Australia) Leigh Adams	2	2	1	3				3	0	16
5	(Sweden) Andreas Jonsson	3	3	2	3				1		13
6	(Denmark) Nicki Pedersen	2	2	3				1			13
7	(Australia) Jason Crump	1	3	2					0		11
8	(Norway) Rune Holta	3	3	0	2			0			11
9	(Sweden) Mikael Max	3	2	1	3	1					8
10	(Australia) Ryan Sullivan	1	3	3	2	0	1				8
11	(Poland) Piotr Protasiewicz	3	1	2	1	2	0				7
12	(Poland) Jarosław Hampel	0	1	2	0						7
13	(England) Scott Nicholls	0	0	1							6
14	(Denmark) Hans Andersen	0	2	2	0	1					6
15	(England) Lee Richardson	2	2	1	0						5
16	(Denmark) Jesper B. Jensen	1	3	3	0	0					5
17	(Norway) Arnt Førland	1	2	1							4
18	(Finland) Kai Laukkanen	2	1	1							4
19	(Czech Republic) Aleš Dryml Jr.	2	0	0							3
20	(Denmark) Bjarne Pedersen	2	0	0							3
21	(England) Mark Loram	0	1								2
22	(Norway) Rune Sola	1	1								2
23	(Finland) Joonas Kylmäkorpi	0	0								1
24	(Czech Republic) Bohumil Brhel	0	0								1

== Heat by heat ==
- Heat 01 Jonsson, A Dryml, Sola, Loram
- Heat 02 Max, B Pedersen, Forland, Andersen
- Heat 03 Protasiewicz, Laukkanen, Sullivan, Brhel
- Heat 04 Hancock, Richardson, Jensen, Kylmakorpi
- Heat 05 Sullivan, Andersen, Sola, Kylmakorpi
- Heat 06 Jensen, Forland, Loram, Brhel
- Heat 07 Jonsson, Richardson, Protasiewicz, B Pedersen
- Heat 08 Hancock, Max, Laukkanen, A Dryml
- Heat 09 Holta, Adams, Gollob, Nicholls
- Heat 10 Rickardsson, N Pedersen, Crump, Hampel
- Heat 11 Sullivan, Protasiewicz, Forland, A Dryml
- Heat 12 Jensen, Andersen, Laukkanen, B Pedersen
- Heat 13 Holta, Jonsson, Hampel, Andersen
- Heat 14 Gollob, N Pedersen, Protasiewicz, Hancock
- Heat 15 Crump, Adams, Richardson, Jensen
- Heat 16 Rickardsson, Sullivan, Max, Nicholls [F/Ex]
- Heat 17 Hancock, Hampel, Nicholls, Richardson
- Heat 18 Max, Protasiewicz, Andersen, Jensen
- Heat 19 N Pedersen, Crump, Sullivan [Ex], Holta [Ex/T]
- Heat 20 Jonsson, Gollob, Adams, Rickardsson
- Heat 21 Rickardsson, Hancock, Sullivan, Protasiewicz
- Heat 22 Adams, Holta, Max, Hampel
