= 2004 Speedway Grand Prix of Czech Republic =

Speedway Grand Prix event

- Venue: Markéta Stadium
- Location: Prague, (Czech Republic)
- Start date: 15 May 2004
- Competitors: 24 (2 reserves)

The 2004 Speedway Grand Prix of Czech Republic was the second round of the 2004 Speedway Grand Prix season (the world championship). It took place on 15 May 2004 at the Markéta Stadium in Prague, Czech Republic.

It was the eighth time that the Speedway Grand Prix of Czech Republic had been held.

The Grand Prix was by Australian rider Jason Crump (his 9th career Grand Prix win).

== Grand Prix result ==
Pos.	Rider	1	2	3	4	5	6	SF1	SF2	Final	GP Points
1	(Australia) Jason Crump	2	2	2					3	3	25
2	(Poland) Jarosław Hampel	3	2	3	3			2		2	20
3	(Sweden) Tony Rickardsson	3	3	2				3		1	18
4	(Australia) Ryan Sullivan	2	3	3	3				2	0	16
5	(Australia) Leigh Adams	3	3	0	3				1		13
6	(Poland) Tomasz Gollob	0	2	1	3			1			13
7	(England) Lee Richardson	0	2	1	2			0			11
8	(United States) Greg Hancock	1	2	0	2				0		11
9	(Denmark) Nicki Pedersen	1	0	3	1						8
10	(Norway) Rune Holta	3	2	0	2	1					8
11	(Czech Republic) Bohumil Brhel	2	1	2	1	3	0				7
12	(Sweden) Andreas Jonsson	3	3	0	2	0					7
13	(Denmark) Hans Andersen	1	1	3	1	1					6
14	(Czech Republic) Lukáš Dryml	2	0	2	1	1					6
15	(Denmark) Jesper B. Jensen	2	1	0							5
16	(Poland) Rafał Dobrucki	1	3	3	0	0					5
17	(Denmark) Bjarne Pedersen	3	0	1							4
18	(England) Mark Loram	2	1	1							4
19	(Sweden) Mikael Max	0	2	0							3
20	(Czech Republic) Aleš Dryml Jr.	1	2	0							3
21	(Czech Republic) Antonín Šváb Jr.	0	1								2
22	(Germany) Robert Barth	0	1								2
23	(Poland) Piotr Protasiewicz	0	0								1
24	(Finland) Kai Laukkanen	1	0								1

== Heat by heat ==
- Heat 01 Jonsson, Loram, Andersen, Svab
- Heat 02 B Pedersen, L Dryml, Dobrucki, Barth
- Heat 03 Hampel, Sullivan, A Dryml, Max
- Heat 04 Holta, Brhel, Laukkanen, Protasiewicz
- Heat 05 Andersen, A Dryml, Barth, Protasiewicz
- Heat 06 Dobrucki, Max, Svab, Laukkanen
- Heat 07 Jonsson, Hampel, Brhel, L Dryml
- Heat 08 Sullivan, Holta, Loram, B Pedersen
- Heat 09 Adams, Jensen, N Pedersen, Gollob
- Heat 10 Rickardsson, Crump, Hancock, Richardson
- Heat 11 Andersen, Brhel, B Pedersen, Max
- Heat 12 Dobrucki, L Dryml, Loram, A Dryml
- Heat 13 Adams, Richardson, L Dryml, Jonsson
- Heat 14 Sullivan, Crump, Brhel, N Pedersen
- Heat 15 Hampel, Hancock, Jensen, Dobrucki
- Heat 16 Rickardsson, Gollob, Andersen, Holta
- Heat 17 N Pedersen, Holta, L Dryml, Jensen
- Heat 18 Brhel, Jonsson, Andersen, Dobrucki
- Heat 19 Hampel, Crump, Gollob, Adams
- Heat 20 Sullivan, Rickardsson, Richardson, Hancock
- Heat 21 Gollob, Hancock, N Pedersen, Jonsson
- Heat 22 Adams, Richardson, Holta, Brhel
