= 2004 Speedway Grand Prix of Great Britain =

Speedway Grand Prix event

- Venue: Millennium Stadium
- Location: Cardiff, (Wales)
- Start date: 12 June 2004
- Competitors: 24 (2 reserves)

The 2004 Speedway Grand Prix of Great Britain was the fourth round of the 2004 Speedway Grand Prix season (the world championship). It took place on 12 June 2004 at the Millennium Stadium in Cardiff, Wales.

It was the 10th time that the Speedway Grand Prix of Great Britain had been held.

The Grand Prix was by the American rider Greg Hancock (his 7th career Grand Prix win).

== Grand Prix result ==
Pos.	Rider	1	2	3	4	5	6	SF1	SF2	Final	GP Points
1	(United States) Greg Hancock	3	2	2	2			3		3	25
2	(Australia) Leigh Adams	3	3	1	3				2	2	20
3	(England) Lee Richardson	2	3	2	0	2		2		1	18
4	(Australia) Jason Crump	2	3	2	3				3	0	16
5	(Denmark) Nicki Pedersen	3	3	1	3			1			13
6	(Sweden) Andreas Jonsson	3	3	2	3				1		13
7	(Poland) Tomasz Gollob	2	1	3	2			0			11
8	(England) Scott Nicholls	2	1	2	1	3	2		0		11
9	(Sweden) Tony Rickardsson	2	1	2	1						8
10	(England) David Norris	3	2	1	3	1					8
11	(England) Mark Loram	3	1	2	3	0	0				7
12	(Poland) Piotr Protasiewicz	0	0	2	0						7
13	(Denmark) Bjarne Pedersen	1	0	1							6
14	(Poland) Jarosław Hampel	0	0	1							6
15	(Australia) Ryan Sullivan	1	1	0							5
16	(Norway) Rune Holta	2	0	3	0	0					5
17	(Czech Republic) Bohumil Brhel	1	3	0							4
18	(England) Chris Louis	0	2	1							4
19	(Denmark) Hans Andersen	1	2	0							3
20	(Czech Republic) Aleš Dryml Jr.	1	3	0							3
21	(Sweden) Mikael Max	0	1								2
22	(Czech Republic) Lukáš Dryml	0	1								2
23	(Denmark) Jesper B. Jensen	1	0								1
24	(Finland) Kai Laukkanen	0	0								1

== Heat by heat ==
- Heat 01 Hancock, Nicholls, Andersen, Louis
- Heat 02 Norris, Gollob, Brhel, Laukkanen
- Heat 03 Jonsson, Richardson, A Dryml, L Dryml
- Heat 04 Loram, Holta, Jensen, Max
- Heat 05 A Dryml, Andersen, Max, Laukkanen
- Heat 06 Brhel, Louis, L Dryml, Jensen
- Heat 07 Jonsson, Hancock, Gollob, Holta
- Heat 08 Richardson, Norris, Nicholls, Loram
- Heat 09 N Pedersen, Crump, B Pedersen, Protasiewicz
- Heat 10 Adams, Rickardsson, Sullivan, Hampel
- Heat 11 Gollob, Loram, Louis, A Dryml [E/F]
- Heat 12 Holta, Nicholls, Brhel [Ex/2], Andersen [Ex]
- Heat 13 N Pedersen, Jonsson, Nicholls, Hampel
- Heat 14 Loram, Richardson, Rickardsson, B Pedersen
- Heat 15 Crump, Hancock, Sullivan, Holta
- Heat 16 Adams, Gollob, Norris, Protasiewicz
- Heat 17 Nicholls, Protasiewicz, B Pedersen, Sullivan
- Heat 18 Norris, Rickardsson, Hampel, Holta
- Heat 19 Gollob, Crump, N Pedersen, Richardson [F/Ex]
- Heat 20 Jonsson, Hancock, Adams, Loram
- Heat 21 N Pedersen, Nicholls, Rickardsson, Loram
- Heat 22 Adams, Richardson, Norris, Protasiewicz
