= 2004 Speedway Grand Prix of Sweden =

Speedway Grand Prix event

- Venue: Stockholm Olympic Stadium
- Location: Stockholm, (Sweden)
- Start date: 1 May 2004
- Competitors: 24 (2 reserves)

The 2004 Speedway Grand Prix of Sweden was the first round of the 2004 Speedway Grand Prix season (the world championship). It took place on 1 May 2004 at the Stockholm Olympic Stadium in Stockholm, Sweden.

It was the 10th time that the Speedway Grand Prix of Sweden had been held.

The Grand Prix was by the Australian rider Leigh Adams (his 3rd career Grand Prix win).

== Grand Prix result ==
Pos.	Rider	1	2	3	4	5	6	SF1	SF2	Final	GP Points
1	(Australia) Leigh Adams	1	3	2				3		3	25
2	(Australia) Jason Crump	2	2	3				2		2	20
3	(Sweden) Tony Rickardsson	1	3	3					2	1	18
4	(Poland) Tomasz Gollob	3	0	3	3				3	0	16
5	(United States) Greg Hancock	2	2	1	2			1			13
6	(Denmark) Nicki Pedersen	3	2	0	2				1		13
7	(England) Lee Richardson	2	0	2	0	3	3	0			11
8	(Denmark) Jesper B. Jensen	3	2	2	2				0		11
9	(Denmark) Bjarne Pedersen	1	3	2	1	2	1				8
10	(England) Mark Loram	2	3	1	2	1					8
11	(Czech Republic) Bohumil Brhel	2	3	3	0	0					7
12	(Australia) Ryan Sullivan	3	2	3	1	0					7
13	(Norway) Rune Holta	0	0	1							6
14	(Sweden) Mikael Max	1	3	3	1	1					6
15	(Sweden) Andreas Jonsson	3	1	3	1	0					5
16	(England) Scott Nicholls	0	0	0							5
17	(Denmark) Hans Andersen	1	2	1							4
18	(Sweden) Freddie Lindgren	0	2	1							4
19	(Poland) Jarosław Hampel	3	1	0							3
20	(Czech Republic) Lukáš Dryml	2	0	0							3
21	(Sweden) Peter Ljung	0	1								2
22	(Poland) Piotr Protasiewicz	1	1								2
23	(Czech Republic) Aleš Dryml Jr.	0	0								1
24	(Finland) Kai Laukkanen	0	0								1

== Heat by heat ==
- Heat 01 Sullivan, Richardson, Andersen, Lindgren
- Heat 02 Jonsson, Brhel, B Pedersen, Ljung
- Heat 03 Hampel, Loram, Max, Laukkanen
- Heat 04 Jensen, L Dryml, Protasiewicz, A Dryml
- Heat 05 Max, Andersen, Ljung, A Dryml
- Heat 06 B Pedersen, Lindgren, Protasiewicz, Laukkanen
- Heat 07 Brhel, Sullivan, Hampel, L Dryml
- Heat 08 Loram, Jensen, Jonsson, Richardson
- Heat 09 N Pedersen, Hancock, Adams, Holta
- Heat 10 Gollob, Crump, Rickardsson, Nicholls
- Heat 11 Max, Richardson, Lindgren, Hampel
- Heat 12 Jonsson, B Pedersen, Andersen, L Dryml
- Heat 13 Brhel, N Pedersen, B Pedersen, Nicholls
- Heat 14 Adams, Crump, Loram, Richardson
- Heat 15 Sullivan, Hancock, Jonsson, Gollob
- Heat 16 Rickardsson, Jensen, Max, Holta
- Heat 17 Richardson, B Pedersen, Holta, Jonsson
- Heat 18 Gollob, Loram, Max, Nicholls
- Heat 19 Crump, Jensen, Sullivan, Brhel
- Heat 20 Rickardsson, Adams, Hancock, N Pedersen
- Heat 21 Richardson, N Pedersen, Loram, Sullivan
- Heat 22 Gollob, Hancock, B Pedersen, Brhel
