= 2014 Speedway Grand Prix Qualification =

Seasons
- ← 2013 2015 →

The 2014 Individual Speedway World Championship Grand Prix Qualification were a series of motorcycle speedway meetings used to determine the three riders who qualified for the 2014 Speedway Grand Prix. The final called the Grand Prix Challenge – took place on 24 August 2013, in Poole, Great Britain.

== Qualifying rounds ==
=== Round One ===
- 20 May 2013
- (Germany) Abensberg

Pos.	Rider	Points	Details
1	(Slovenia) (15) Matej Zagar	11	(0,3,2,3,3)
2	(Poland) (14) Przemyslaw Pawlicki	11	(2,3,3,3,N)
3	(Czech Republic) (12) Ales Dryml	10	(3,2,3,1,1)
4	(Germany) (16) Martin Smolinski	10	(1,3,3,3,0)
5	(Ukraine) (13) Aleksandr Loktaev	10	(3,3,3,1,0)
6	(Germany) (5) Tobias Kroner	9	(3,1,0,2,3)
7	(Poland) (8) Maciej Janowski	9	(2,1,2,3,1)
8	(Finland) (2) Timo Lahti	8	(1,2,1,2,2)
9	(Australia) (4) Cameron Woodward	8	(3,0,2,1,2)
10	(Germany) (9) Max Dilger	8	(2,2,1,0,3)
11	(United Kingdom) (6) Scott Nicholls	7	(0,1,2,2,2)
12	(Slovenia) (3) Aleksander Čonda	6	(0,2,0,1,3)
13	(Sweden) (7) Dennis Andersson	5	(1,Fx,1,2,1)
14	(Ukraine) (1) Andriej Karpov	4	(2,0,0,0,2)
15	(Sweden) (11) Peter Ljung	4	(1,1,1,0,1)
16	(Netherlands) (10) Henny Van Der Steen	0	(0,0,0,0,0)
—	(Germany) (17) Marcel Helfer	—	(—)
—	(Germany) (18) Richard Speiser	—	(—)

=== Round Two ===
- 8 June 2013
- (Austria) St. Johann

Pos.	Rider	Points	Details
1	(Poland) (14) Krzysztof Kasprzak	14	(3,3,3,3,2)
2	(Australia) (12) Troy Batchelor	12	(0,3,3,3,3)
3	(Croatia) (5) Jurica Pavlic	12	(3,1,2,3,3)
4	(Australia) (9) Dakota North	11	(2,0,3,3,3)
5	(Sweden) (6) Thomas H. Jonasson	10	(2,1,3,2,1)
6	(United Kingdom) (15) Edward Kennett	9	(2,2,1,1,3)
7	(Denmark) (3) Kenneth Bjerre	8	(1,3,2,2,0)
8	(Denmark) (13) Peter Kildemand	8	(1,3,FX,2,2)
9	(Poland) (1) Jakub Jamróg	7	(3,2,1,0,1)
10	(Czech Republic) (2) Vaclav Milik	7	(2,2,0,2,1)
11	(Sweden) (10) Linus Sundström	6	(3,0,X,1,2)
12	(Germany) (11) Kevin Wolbert	5	(1,0,2,1,1)
13	(United Kingdom) (7) Chris Harris	4	(F,1,FX,1,2)
14	(Germany) (17) Valentin Grobauer	3	(0,1,2,0,0)
15	(Italy) (4) Nicolas Covatti	2	(0,2,F,0,0)
16	(Austria) (16) Dany Gappmaier	1	(0,1,0,0,0)
17	(Slovakia) (8) Jan Mesiarik	0	(F,-,-,-,-)

=== Round Three ===
- 15 June 2013
- (Hungary) Debrecen

Pos.	Rider	Points	Details
1	(Poland) (11) Piotr Pawlicki	14	(2,3,3,3,3)
2	(Latvia) (13) Andrej Lebedev	14	(3,3,3,2,3)
3	(Denmark) (10) Michael Jepsen Jensen	13	(3,2,2,3,3)
4	(Denmark) (7) Hans N. Andersen	11	(3,1,1,3,3)
5	(Poland) (14) Krzysztof Buczkowski	10	(1,3,3,1,2)
6	(Russia) (6) Wiktor Golubowskij	10	(2,1,2,3,2)
7	(Slovenia) (15) Matic Voldrich	10	(2,2,3,2,1)
8	(Sweden) (1) Daniel Nermark	7	(3,1,1,0,2)
9	(Hungary) (8) Roland Benko	6	(0,3,2,1,0)
10	(Hungary) (9) Norbert Magosi	6	(1,2,1,R,2)
11	(Czech Republic) (16) Martin Gavenda	5	(0,2,0,2,1)
12	(Czech Republic) (4) Tomas Suchanek	5	(2,1,0,1,1)
13	(Argentina) (2) Jonathan Iturre	3	(1,0,2,0,X)
14	(Ukraine) (12) Stanislaw Mielniczuk	3	(X,0,1,2,X)
15	(Czech Republic) (3) Filip Sitera	2	(0,0,0,1,1)
16	(Hungary) (5) Jozsef Tabaka	1	(1,F)
17	(Hungary) (17) Laszlo Szatmari	0	(R,0,0)

== Race-offs ==
=== Race-off One ===
- 7 August 2013
- (Denmark) Holsted

Pos.	Rider	Points	Details
1	(Denmark) (4) Niels-Kristian Iversen	14	(2,3,3,3,3)
2	(Denmark) (7) Kenneth Bjerre	12	(3,3,1,3,2)
3	(Ukraine) (11) Aleksandr Loktaev	11	(3,2,3,1,2)
4	(Sweden) (16) Daniel Nermark	11	(2,2,1,3,3)
5	(Poland) (8) Krzysztof Kasprzak	9	(1,0,2,3,3)
6	(Poland) (12) Przemyslaw Pawlicki	9	(2,1,3,R,3)
7	(Sweden) (1) Thomas H. Jonasson	9	(1,3,2,2,1)
8	(Poland) (15) Piotr Pawlicki	8	(3,0,1,2,2)
9	(Finland) (3) Timo Lahti	8	(0,1,3,2,2)
10	(Denmark) (2) Peter Kildemand	7	(3,1,0,2,1)
11	(Latvia) (10) Andrej Lebedev	5	(F,3,2,R,R)
12	(Czech Republic) (5) Ales Dryml	5	(0,1,2,1,1)
13	(Germany) (14) Tobias Kroner	5	(1,2,1,1,0)
14	(United Kingdom) (6) Edward Kennett	4	(2,F,0,1,1)
15	(Australia) (13) Dakota North	2	(0,2,0,0,R)
16	(Russia) (9) Wiktor Golubowskij	1	(1,0,0,0,0)
—	(Sweden) (17) Linus Sundström	—	(—)
—	(Germany) (18) Kevin Wolbert	—	(—)

=== Race-off Two ===
- 22 June 2013
- (Italy) Lonigo

Pos.	Rider	Points	Details
1	(Denmark) (1) Hans Andersen	13	(3,3,2,2,3)
2	(Slovenia) (7) Matej Zagar	12	(3,3,1,3,2)
3	(Denmark) (4) Michael Jepsen Jensen	11	(1,3,3,3,1)
4	(Germany) (8) Martin Smolinski	11	(2,2,3,2,2)
5	(Czech Republic) (16) Vaclav Milik	10	(0,1,3,3,3)
6	(Poland) (10) Maciej Janowski	9	(3,3,2,FX,1)
7	(Australia) (15) Troy Batchelor	9	(3,2,2,2,0)
8	(Croatia) (11) Jurica Pavlic	9	(2,1,1,3,2)
9	(Poland) (14) Krzysztof Buczkowski	9	(2,2,1,1,3)
10	(Germany) (3) Max Dilger	7	(0,0,2,2,3)
11	(Slovenia) (12) Matic Voldrih	6	(1,0,3,X,2)
12	(Australia) (2) Cameron Woodward	6	(2,1,1,1,1)
13	(Poland) (13) Jakub Jamróg	4	(1,2,0,0,1)
14	(Hungary) (6) Roland Benko	2	(1,0,0,1,0)
15	(Italy) (9) Guglielmo Franchetti	1	(0,1,0,0,0)
16	(Hungary) (5) Norbert Magosi	1	(0,X,0,1,0)
—	(United Kingdom) (17) Scott Nicholls	—	(—)
—	(Czech Republic) (18) Tomas Suchanek	—	(—)

== Grand Prix Challenge ==
- 24 August 2013
- (United Kingdom) Poole

Pos.	Rider	Points	Details
1	(Denmark) (10) Niels-Kristian Iversen	13	(3,3,3,3,1)
2	(Poland) (3) Krzysztof Kasprzak	12	(3,2,2,2,3)
3	(Denmark) (7) Kenneth Bjerre	11	(3,1,2,2,3)
4	(Germany) (14) Martin Smolinski	10	(3,2,0,3,2)
5	(United Kingdom) (15) Chris Harris	10	(2,3,1,2,2)*
6	(Australia) (8) Troy Batchelor	9	(0,2,3,1,3)
7	(Denmark) (12) Michael Jepsen Jensen	7	(0,3,3,0,1)
8	(Denmark) (6) Hans Andersen	7	(2,0,2,3,0)
9	(United Kingdom) (9) Daniel King	7	(2,3,1,1,0)
10	(Poland) (13) Piotr Pawlicki	7	(0,1,1,3,2)
11	(Sweden) (16) Daniel Nermark	7	(1,1,3,1,1)
12	(Poland) (2) Maciej Janowski	7	(2,1,2,0,2)
13	(Sweden) (11) Thomas H Jonasson	6	(1,0,0,2,3)
14	(Czech Republic) (1) Vaclav Milik	5	(1,2,1,1,Fx)
15	(Finland) (5) Timo Lahti	2	(1,0,0,0,1)
16	(Denmark) (4) Peter Kildemand	0	(0,0,0,Fx,R)

- Chris Harris qualified as Tomasz Gollob, who had been handed a wildcard, was forced to refuse due to sponsorship problems. His place then went to first qualified reserve who was 5th placed Harris as 4th placed Smolinski had already qualified due to Iversen qualifying as of right in the 2013 Speedway GP series.

== See also ==
- 2013 Speedway Grand Prix
