= 2007 Speedway Grand Prix Qualification =

Motorcycle speedway meeting series

The 2007 Speedway Grand Prix Qualification or GP Challenge was a series of motorcycle speedway meetings used to determine the 3 riders that would qualify for the 2007 Speedway Grand Prix to join the other 9 riders that finished in the leading positions from the 2006 Speedway Grand Prix and 4 seeded riders.

The qualifying returned following a one years absence.

Wiesław Jaguś won the GP Challenge.

== Format ==
- First round (48 riders qualifying from respective national championships)
- Second round – 16 riders to GP Challenge
- Final round – 3 riders from the GP Challenge to the 2007 Grand Prix

== Second round ==
16 riders to GP Challenge

2nd Rd (8 July 2006 POL Tarnów)
Pos	Rider	Points
1	NOR Rune Holta	11+3
2	POL Wiesław Jaguś	10+2
3	FIN Kai Laukkanen	10+1
4	DEN Hans Andersen	11+0
5	POL Janusz Kołodziejj	10
6	RUS Renat Gafurov	10
7	CZE Lukáš Dryml	10
8	RUS Denis Gizatullin	9
9	POL Sebastian Ułamek	8
10	AUS Rory Schlein	7
11	DEN Kenneth Bjerre	7
12	CZE Bohumil Brhel	6
13	GER Christian Hefenbrock	6
14	GER Stephan Katt	6
15	DEN Henrik Møller	1
16	NOR Mike Bjerk	0

2nd Rd (9 July 2006 HUN Miskolc)
Pos	Rider	Points
1	SVN Matej Ferjan	10+3
2	CZE Aleš Dryml Jr.	15+2
3	ENG Simon Stead	11+1
4	SWE Peter Karlsson	11+0
5	GER Martin Smolinski	10
6	SWE David Ruud	9
7	ENG David Howe	8
8	ITA Mattia Carpanese	7
9	SWE Peter Ljung	7
10	SVN Jernej Kolenko	7
11	USA Billy Janniro	6
12	HUN László Szatmári	6
13	GER Thomas Stange	5
14	SVN Izak Šantej	5
15	ITA Simone Terenzani	3
16	HUN Sándor Tihanyi	0

2nd Rd (9 July 2006 SVK Žarnovica)
Pos	Rider	Points
1	AUS Ryan Sullivan	12+3
2	POL Piotr Protasiewicz	12+2
3	DEN Charlie Gjedde	11+1
4	SWE Mikael Max	12+0
5	POL Robert Kościecha	11
6	ENG Chris Harris	10
7	DEN Niels Kristian Iversen	9
8	SWE Fredrik Lindgren	9
9	CRO Jurica Pavlic	8
10	CZE Tomáš Topinka	8
11	ENG Edward Kennett	5
12	AUS Travis McGowan	5
13	RUS Sergej Darkin	4
14	NED Theo Pijper	2
15	AUT Heinrich Schatzer	2
16	SVK Vladimir Visvader	0

== Final round ==
=== Gp challenge ===
3 riders to 2007 Grand Prix

- 19 August 2006 SWE Vetlanda

Pos.	Rider	Points	final
1	POL Wiesław Jaguś	12	3
2	NOR Rune Holta	12	2
3	DEN Hans Andersen	15	1
4	SWE Peter Karlsson	14	0
5	ENG Chris Harris	11	
6	FIN Kai Laukkanen	9	
7	DEN Charlie Gjedde	8	
8	POL Piotr Protasiewicz	7	
9	AUS Ryan Sullivan	7	
10	SVN Matej Ferjan	6	
11	ENG Simon Stead	5	
12	RUS Renat Gafurov	5	
13	GER Martin Smolinski	4	
14	SWE Mikael Max	2	
15	POL Robert Kościecha	2	
16	ENG David Howe	1	
