= 2015 Speedway Grand Prix Qualification =

Seasons
- ← 2014 2016 →

The 2015 Individual Speedway World Championship Grand Prix Qualification is a series of motorcycle speedway meetings used to determine the three riders who qualified for the 2015 Speedway Grand Prix. The top eight riders finishing the 2014 Grand Prix series automatically qualify for 2015. The final round of qualification – the Grand Prix Challenge – took place on 20 September 2014 in Lonigo, Italy.

== Qualifying rounds ==
=== Round One ===
- 7 June 2014
- (United Kingdom) Berwick

Pos.	Rider	Points	Details
1	(Sweden) Linus Sundström	12	(2,3,1,3,3)
2	(Australia) Jason Doyle	12	(3,1,3,3,2)
3	(Poland) Maciej Janowski	11	(1,3,3,1,3)
4	(Denmark) Hans N. Andersen	11	(3,2,2,1,3)
5	(Poland) Przemysław Pawlicki	9	(3,0,0,3,3)
6	(Denmark) Kenneth Bjerre	9	(3,3,1,2,0)
7	(France) David Bellego	9	(2,2,2,1,2)
8	(United Kingdom) Craig Cook	8	(2,0,3,2,1)
9	(United Kingdom) Lewis Bridger	8	(1,1,3,2,1)
10	(United Kingdom) Chris Harris	8	(1,2,2,2,1)
11	(Czech Republic) Tomáš Suchánek	6	(0,2,1,3,0)
12	(Czech Republic) Matěj Kůs	5	(1,3,0,0,1)
13	(United Kingdom) Richard Lawson	3	(0,0,1,0,2)
14	(Netherlands) Theo Pijper	3	(0,0,0,1,2)
15	(Hungary) Norbert Magosi	3	(0,1,2,0,0)
16	(Australia) Ty Proctor	2	(2,T,0,0,0)
17	(United Kingdom) Kyle Howarth	1	(-,1,-,-,-)

=== Round Two ===
- 7 June 2014
- (Slovenia) Ljubljana

Pos.	Rider	Points	Details
1	(Denmark) Nicolai Klindt	13	(3,1,3,3,3)
2	(Slovenia) Matej Zagar	13	(2,3,2,3,3)
3	(Poland) Janusz Kolodziej	11	(3,3,1,3,1)
4	(Poland) Patryk Dudek	10	(2,3,3,1,1)
5	(Denmark) Peter Kildemand	10	(3,1,1,3,2)
6	(Australia) Troy Batchelor	10	(1,2,3,2,2)
7	(Sweden) Peter Ljung	10	(2,2,2,2,2)
8	(Italy) Nicolas Covatti	9	(0,3,2,1,3)
9	(Australia) Cameron Woodward	7	(T,1,3,2,1)
10	(Czech Republic) Josef Franc	6	(3,X,0,0,3)
11	(Sweden) Kim Nilsson	6	(2,2,0,1,1)
12	(Slovenia) Matic Voldrih	5	(0,0,1,2,2)
13	(Finland) Tero Aarnio	4	(1,2,1,0,E)
14	(Slovenia) Maks Gregorič	2	(-,-,2,-,0)
15	(Italy) Mattia Carpanese	2	(1,1,0,0,0)
16	(Croatia) Karlo Majnić	1	(0,0,0,1,0)
17	(Slovenia) Denis Štojs	1	(1,-,-,E,-)
18	(Ukraine) Andriy Kobrin	0	(0,E,-,-,-)

=== Round Three ===
- 9 June 2014
- (Germany) Abensberg

Pos.	Rider	Points	Details
1	(Sweden) Thomas H. Jonasson	15	(3,3,3,3,3)
2	(Czech Republic) Václav Milík Jr.	12	(X,3,3,3,3)
3	(Germany) Martin Smolinski	12	(1,2,3,3,3)
4	(Denmark) Mads Korneliussen	11	(2,2,1,3,3)
5	(Denmark) Mikkel Michelsen	11	(3,3,2,2,1)
6	(Poland) Piotr Pawlicki, Jr	8	(3,2,3,X,-)
7	(Russia) Artem Laguta	8	(3,1,2,2,M)
8	(Sweden) Oliver Berntzon	8	(1,3,2,X,2)
9	(United States) Ricky Wells	8	(2,1,1,2,2)
10	(United Kingdom) Daniel King	6	(2,0,1,1,2)
11	(Germany) Mathias Schultz	5	(1,1,2,1,X)
12	(Russia) Renat Gafurov	5	(1,2,1,1,X)
13	(United Kingdom) Richie Worrall	3	(0,1,0,0,2)
14	(Italy) Michele Paco Castagna	3	(0,0,0,2,1)
15	(Germany) Tobias Busch	3	(2,-,0,-,1)
16	(Slovakia) Adam Čarada	1	(M,E,0,0,1)
17	(Germany) Mathias Bartz	1	(-,-,T,1,0)
18	(Poland) Krzysztof Kasprzak	0	(E,E,-,-,-)

== Race-offs ==
=== Race-off One ===
- 21 June 2014
- (Croatia) Gorican

Pos.	Rider	Points	Details
1	(Denmark) Hans N. Andersen	12	(3,3,3,2,1)
2	(Sweden) Linus Sundström	11	(2,2,3,1,3)
3	(Poland) Janusz Kolodziej	11	(3,3,1,3,1)
4	(Poland) Maciej Janowski	10	(3,1,2,3,1)
5	(Sweden) Thomas H. Jonasson	10	(2,1,3,R,3)
6	(Denmark) Peter Kildemand	9	(0,3,0,3,3)
7	(Slovenia) Matej Zagar	9	(2,U,1,3,3)
8	(Germany) Martin Smolinski	8	(1,1,2,2,2)
9	(Croatia) Jurica Pavlic	8	(1,2,3,0,2)
10	(Australia) Troy Batchelor	7	(2,3,0,2,T)
11	(Denmark) Mikkel Michelsen	6	(0,0,3,1,2)
12	(Czech Republic) Josef Franc	6	(2,1,1,0,2)
13	(Italy) Nicolas Covatti	5	(3,0,2,0,0)
14	(United Kingdom) Daniel King	5	(1,2,1,1,0)
15	(United States) Ricky Wells	2	(0,1,0,1,0)
16	(United Kingdom) Craig Cook	1	(0,0,0,0,1)
17	(Czech Republic) Tomáš Suchánek	0	(-,-,-,-,0)
—	(Slovenia) Matic Voldrih		

=== Race-off Two ===
- 21 June 2014
- (Poland) Częstochowa

Pos.	Rider	Points	Details
1	(Denmark) Kenneth Bjerre	11	(0,3,3,3,2)
2	(Poland) Przemysław Pawlicki	11	(2,3,3,2,1)
3	(Poland) Patryk Dudek	11	(3,2,2,1,3)
4	(Australia) Cameron Woodward	11	(3,1,1,3,3)
5	(Denmark) Nicolai Klindt	10	(2,3,2,3,0)
6	(Denmark) Mads Korneliussen	10	(3,2,3,1,1)
7	(Australia) Jason Doyle	10	(1,2,2,3,2)
8	(United Kingdom) Chris Harris	9	(2,0,3,2,2)
9	(Sweden) Oliver Berntzon	9	(3,2,1,X,3)
10	(Poland) Adrian Miedzinski	6	(2,3,1,0,0)
11	(Sweden) Peter Ljung	5	(0,1,2,1,1)
12	(United Kingdom) Lewis Bridger	4	(1,0,0,1,2)
13	(France) David Bellego	3	(0,0,0,0,3)
14	(Poland) Piotr Pawlicki Jr.	3	(0,0,0,2,1)
15	(Sweden) Kim Nilsson	3	(-,1,-,2,-)
16	(Czech Republic) Václav Milík Jr.	3	(1,1,1,0,0)
17	(Russia) Artem Laguta	1	(1,-,-,-,-)
18	(Germany) Mathias Schultz	0	(-,-,-,0,0)

== 2014 Speedway Grand Prix Challenge ==
- 20 September 2014
- (Italy) Lonigo
- Zagar won the event following a ride-off with Doyle and Harris. As he had qualified for the 2015 Grand Prix series, by virtue of his 5th-place finish in the overall 2014 Grand Prix standings, the 4th place rider, Janowski, was awarded a GP place.

Pos.	Rider	Points	Details
1	(Slovenia) (9) Matej Zagar	13	(2,3,2,3,3)
2	(Australia) (15) Jason Doyle	13	(3,3,3,2,2)
3	(United Kingdom) (1) Chris Harris	13	(3,2,3,2,3)
4	(Poland) (7) Maciej Janowski	11	(3,2,1,3,2)
5	(Sweden) (13) Thomas H. Jonasson	10	(1,1,3,2,3)
6	(Poland) (14) Przemysław Pawlicki	10	(2,3,1,1,3)
7	(Italy) (3) Nicolas Covatti	10	(2,1,3,3,1)
8	(Denmark) (12) Peter Kildemand	8	(3,3,2,W,W)
9	(Sweden) (2) Peter Ljung	7	(1,1,1,3,1)
10	(Denmark) (5) Hans N. Andersen	6	(2,0,0,2,2)
11	(Sweden) (6) Linus Sundström	5	(1,0,1,1,2)
12	(Denmark) (16) Nicolai Klindt	5	(0,2,2,1,0)
13	(Sweden) (4) Oliver Berntzon	4	(D,1,2,D,1)
14	(Poland) (10) Janusz Kolodziej	3	(1,2,W,-,-)
15	(Denmark) (8) Mads Korneliussen	2	(0,0,0,1,1)
16	(Italy) (11) Mattia Carpanese	0	(0,0,0,0,0)
16	(Italy) (17) Michele Paco Castagna	0	(-,-,-0,-)
18	(Italy) (18) Nicolas Vicentin	0	(-,-,-,-,U)

== See also ==
- 2014 Speedway Grand Prix
