= Brent Werner =

American motorcycle speedway rider (born 1974)

- Born: April 15, 1974 (age 52); Los Angeles, United States

Career history

Great Britain
- 1995–1997: Long Eaton Invaders
- 1998: Newcastle Diamonds
- 1999–2000: Workington Comets
- 2001: Eastbourne Eagles
- 2002–2005: Rye House Rockets
- 2006: Arena Essex Hammers
- 2006: Mildenhall Fen Tigers
- 2007: Birmingham Brummies
- 2008: Somerset Rebels
- 2009: Newport Wasps

Team honours
- 1988, 1989: U.S. Junior Champion
- 1999: Pairs champion
- 1997: Premier League Four-Team Championship

Jeffrey Brent Werner (born April 15, 1974) is a former motorcycle speedway rider from the United States. He earned 15 caps for the United States national speedway team.

== Career ==
Werner was a member of United States team at Speedway World Cups.

Werner spent much of his career riding in the United Kingdom. His first season was in 1995 for the Long Eaton Invaders. In 1997, he was part of the Long Eaton four that won the Premier League Four-Team Championship, which was held on 3 August 1997, at the East of England Arena.

In 1999, Werner won the Premier League Pairs Championship partnering Carl Stonehewer for Workington Comets, during the 1999 Premier League speedway season.

== Results ==
- Individual World Championship
  - 1994 – 12th place in American Final
- Team World Championship (Speedway World Team Cup and Speedway World Cup)
  - 2000 - (England) Coventry – 3rd place (0 pts)
  - 2001 - (Poland) Wrocław – 5th place (2 pts)
  - 2002 – 6th place
  - 2006 – 6th place
- U.S. Junior National Championship
  - 1988 – US Champion
  - 1989 – US Champion

== See also ==
- United States national speedway team
- Speedway World Cup
