= 2004 Speedway Grand Prix =

World speedway championship season

Season details
- Dates: 1 May – 2 October
- Events: 9
- Cities: 9
- Countries: 7
- Riders: 22 permanents 2 wild card(s)
- Heats: 225 (in 9 events)

Winners
- Champion: AUS Jason Crump
- Runner-up: SWE Tony Rickardsson
- 3rd place: USA Greg Hancock

The 2004 Speedway Grand Prix was the 59th edition of the official World Championship and the tenth season in the Speedway Grand Prix era used to determine the Speedway World Champion.

After finishing second in 2001, 2002 and 2003, Jason Crump broke through to become Australia's first Individual World Champion since Jack Young had won his second straight World title in 1952.

== Event format ==
The system first used in 1998 continued to be adopted with 24 riders, divided into two classes. The eight best would be directly qualified for the "Main Event", while the sixteen others would be knocked out if they finished out of the top two in 4-man heats on two occasions – while they would go through if they finished inside the top two on two occasions. This resulted in 10 heats, where eight proceeded to the Main Event, where exactly the same system was applied to give eight riders to a semi-final.

The semi-finals were then two heats of four, where the top two qualified for a final – there was no consolation final. The 4 finalists scored 25, 20, 18 and 16 points, with 5th and 6th place getting 13, 7th and 8th 11, and after that 8, 8, 7, 7, etc. Places after 8th place were awarded according to the time a rider was knocked out and, secondly, according to position in the last heat he rode in.

== Qualification ==
The 2004 season had 22 permanent riders and two wild cards at each event. The permanent riders are highlighted in the results table below.

== Event schedule and winners ==
Calendar

Date	Grand Prix	Venue	Winner	Result
1 May	Sweden	Olympiastadion, Stockholm	Leigh Adams	2004 Swedish GP
15 May	Czech Republic	Markéta Stadium, Prague	Jason Crump	2004 Czech GP
29 May	Europe	Stadion Olimpijski, Wrocław	Bjarne Pedersen	2004 European GP
12 June	Great Britain	Millennium Stadium, Cardiff	Greg Hancock	2004 British GP
26 June	Denmark	Parken Stadium, Copenhagen	Jason Crump	2004 Danish GP
21 August	Scandinavia	Ullevi, Gothenburg	Hans Andersen	2004 Scandinavian GP
4 September	Slovenia	Matija Gubec Stadium, Krško	Tony Rickardsson	2004 Slovenian GP
18 September	Poland	Polonia Stadium, Bydgoszcz	Tomasz Gollob	2004 Polish GP
2 October	Norway	Vikingskipet, Hamar	Tony Rickardsson	2004 Norwegian GP

== Final standings ==
Qualifies for next season's Grand Prix series
Full-time Grand Prix rider
Wild card, track reserve or qualified reserve

Pos.	Rider	Points	SWE (Sweden)	CZE (Czech Republic)	EUR (Poland)	GBR (United Kingdom)	DEN (Denmark)	SCA (Sweden)	SVN (Slovenia)	POL (Poland)	NOR (Norway)
Gold	(Australia) (2) Jason Crump	158	20	25	8	16	25	20	13	20	11
Silver	(Sweden) (3) Tony Rickardsson	155	18	18	18	8	7	18	25	18	25
Bronze	(United States) (5) Greg Hancock	137	13	11	8	25	18	16	20	6	20
4	(Australia) (4) Leigh Adams	131	25	13	11	20	11	11	11	13	16
5	(Denmark) (1) Nicki Pedersen	113	13	8	13	13	16	13	13	11	13
6	(Poland) (6) Tomasz Gollob	113	16	13	7	11	6	11	6	25	18
7	(Sweden) (10) Andreas Jonsson	97	5	7	7	13	20	8	16	8	13
8	(Poland) (22) Jarosław Hampel	81	3	20	20	6	–	6	6	13	7
9	(Denmark) (17) Hans Andersen	80	4	6	3	3	7	25	18	8	6
10	(Denmark) (15) Bjarne Pedersen	78	8	4	25	6	8	8	11	5	3
11	(United Kingdom) (16) Lee Richardson	76	11	11	5	18	5	7	7	7	5
12	(United Kingdom) (7) Scott Nicholls	66	5	–	4	11	11	13	5	11	6
13	(Australia) (9) Ryan Sullivan	65	7	16	11	5	4	4	4	6	8
14	(Norway) (8) Rune Holta	60	6	8	1	5	4	1	8	16	11
15	(Poland) (12) Piotr Protasiewicz	55	2	1	16	7	5	5	5	7	7
16	(Sweden) (14) Mikael Max	49	6	3	6	2	8	5	7	4	8
17	(United Kingdom) (11) Mark Loram	38	8	4	6	7	2	2	3	4	2
18	(Denmark) (21) Jesper B. Jensen	37	11	5	2	1	6	4	1	2	5
19	(Czech Republic) (18) Bohumil Brhel	32	7	7	5	4	2	3	2	1	1
20	(Finland) (19) Kai Laukkanen	25	1	1	3	1	3	6	3	3	4
21	(Czech Republic) (13) Lukáš Dryml	22	3	6	2	2	1	3	4	1	–
22	(Czech Republic) (20) Aleš Dryml Jr.	22	1	3	1	3	3	1	2	5	3
23	(Poland) Grzegorz Walasek	13	–	–	13	–	–	–	–	–	–
24	(Denmark) Niels-Kristian Iversen	13	–	–	–	–	13	–	–	–	–
25	(Denmark) Kenneth Bjerre	13	–	–	–	–	13	–	–	–	–
26	(Slovenia) Matej Žagar	8	–	–	–	–	–	–	8	–	–
27	(United Kingdom) David Norris	8	–	–	–	8	–	–	–	–	–
28	(Sweden) Peter Karlsson	7	–	–	–	–	–	7	–	–	–
29	(Poland) Rafał Dobrucki	5	–	5	–	–	–	–	–	–	–
30	(Norway) Arnt Förland	4	–	–	–	–	–	–	–	–	4
31	(Sweden) Fredrik Lindgren	4	4	–	–	–	–	–	–	–	–
32	(United Kingdom) Chris Louis	4	–	–	–	4	–	–	–	–	–
33	(Poland) Wiesław Jaguś	4	–	–	4	–	–	–	–	–	–
34	(Poland) Krzysztof Kasprzak	3	–	–	–	–	–	–	–	3	–
35	(Poland) Tomasz Chrzanowski	2	–	–	–	–	–	–	–	2	–
36	(Sweden) Peter Ljung	2	2	–	–	–	–	–	–	–	–
37	(Germany) Robert Barth	2	–	2	–	–	–	–	–	–	–
38	(Norway) Rune Sola	2	–	–	–	–	–	–	–	–	2
39	(Sweden) Antonio Lindbäck	2	–	–	–	–	–	2	–	–	–
40	(Czech Republic) Antonín Šváb Jr.	2	–	2	–	–	–	–	–	–	–
41	(Slovenia) Izak Šantej	1	–	–	–	–	–	–	1	–	–
42	(Finland) Joonas Kylmäkorpi	1	–	–	–	–	–	–	–	–	1
43	(United Kingdom) Simon Stead	1	–	–	–	–	1	–	–	–	–
Pos.	Rider	Points	SWE (Sweden)	CZE (Czech Republic)	EUR (Poland)	GBR (United Kingdom)	DEN (Denmark)	SCA (Sweden)	SVN (Slovenia)	POL (Poland)	NOR (Norway)
