= Bohumil Brhel =

Czech speedway rider

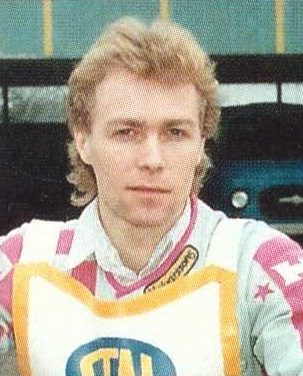
- Born: 10 June 1965 (age 61); Gottwaldov, Czechoslovakia
- Nationality: Czech

Career history

Czechoslovakia/Czech Republic
- 1986–1989: Rudá Hvězda Praha
- 1990–2006: Olymp Praha

Great Britain
- 1990–1995, 1997–1999: King's Lynn Stars
- 1996: Oxford Cheetahs
- 2002: Peterborough Panthers

Poland
- 1991: Rybnik
- 1992–1994: Gorzów
- 1999–2003: Rzeszów
- 2005: Opole
- 2006: Lublin

Sweden
- 2001: Bysarna
- 2002: Indianerna
- 2003: Valsarna
- 2006: Kaparna

Individual honours
- 2001: European Champion
- 1992, 1993, 1998,: Czech Republic Champion
- 1985: Czechoslovak Under-21 Champion

Team honours
- 2004: European Pairs Champion
- 1996: Premier League Four-Team Championship

Bohumil Brhel (born 10 June 1965) is a Czech former motorcycle speedway rider. He earned ten international caps for the Czechoslovakia national speedway team and 15 caps for the Czech Republic national speedway team.

== Career ==
Brhel started racing in the British leagues during the 1990 British League season, when riding for the King's Lynn Stars. He spent six season with them from 1990 to 1995.

In 1996, Brhel joined the Oxford Cheetahs from King's Lynn and was part of the four that won the Premier League Four-Team Championship, which was held on 4 August 1996, at the East of England Arena.

Brhel returned to King's Lynn the following season and rode with them until the end of the 1999 season.

Brhel won the 2001 Individual European Champion title.

Brhel won the Czechoslovak title on six occasions.

== Results ==
=== World Finals ===
Individual

- 1989 - (Germany) Munich, Olympic Stadium - 16th - 1pt
- 1994 - (Denmark) Vojens, Vojens Speedway Center - 10th - 6pts

Grand Prix

Year	Position	Points	Best finish	Notes
1998	26th	5	16th	
2000	33rd	1	24th	
2001	24th	7		
2002	33rd	3		
2003	22nd	26		
2004	19th	32		

World (European) Under-21 Championship

- 1986 (Soviet Union) Rivne - 4th - 10pts

World Team Cup

- 1990 - (Czech Republic) Pardubice - 4th - 19pts (6)
- 1999 - (Czech Republic) Pardubice - 2nd - 35pts (9)
- 2002 - Peterborough, East of England Showground - 5th - 36pts (5)

World Pairs Championship

- 1989 - (Poland) Leszno, Alfred Smoczyk Stadium (with Zdeněk Tesař) - 7th - 25pts (14)
- 1991 - (Poland) Poznań, Olimpia Poznań Stadium (with Roman Matoušek) - 5th 18pts (12)

Individual European Championship

- 2001 - (Belgium) Heusden-Zolder, Heusden-Zolder Speedway - Winner - 14pts
- 2002 - (Poland) Rybnik, Rybnik Municipal Stadium - 5th - 10pts

European Pairs Championship

- 2004 - Winner - 28pts (16)
- 2005 - 2nd - 27pts (13+4)
- 2006 - 4th - 15pts (0)

European Club Champions' Cup

- 1998 - 2nd - 36pts (9)
- 2004 - 4th - 42pts (12)

Individual Czechoslovak Championship

- 1986 - 15th - 17pts
- 1987 - 16th - 19pts
- 1988 - 6th - 53pts
- 1989 - 4th - 61pts
- 1991 - 2nd - 14pts

Individual Czech Republic Championship

- 1992 - Winner - 15pts
- 1993 - Winner - 14pts
- 1994 - 4th - 11pts + 2pts
- 1995 - 10 - 6pts
- 1996 - 3rd - 13pts + 1pt
- 1997 - 2nd - 13pts + 1pts
- 1998 - Winner - 14pts
- 1999 - 3rd - 12pts
- 2000 - Winner - 50pts
- 2001 - Winner - 75pts
- 2002 - 2nd - 14pts + 2pts
- 2004 - Winner - 14pts + 3pts

Individual Junior Czechoslovak Championship

- 1983 - 16th - 32pts
- 1985 - Winner - 43pts

=== Longtrack ===
'World Longtrack Final

- 1994 (Czech Republic) Marianske Lazne (8th) 9pts
- 1995 (Germany) Scheessel (5th) 17pts
- 1996 (Germany) Herxheim (14th) 5pts
- 1997 5 app (12th) 43pts (Grand-Prix-Series)

== See also ==
- List of Speedway Grand Prix riders
- Czech Republic speedway team
