= 2026 Polish speedway season =

2026 season of motorcycle speedway in Poland

The 2026 Polish Speedway season is the 2026 season of motorcycle speedway in Poland. The season will run from April to October.

The league system consists of the PGE Ekstraliga (tier 1), the Metalkas 2 Ekstraliga (tier 2) and the Polish National Speedway League (tier 3). The winner of the tier 1 will be crowned champions of Poland and winner of the Team Speedway Polish Championship. In 2026, the league remained the leading speedway league in the world.

== Individual ==
=== Polish Individual Speedway Championship ===
The 2026 Polish Individual Speedway Championship (Polish: Indywidualne Mistrzostwa Polski, IMP) is the 2026 version of Polish Individual Speedway Championship organised by the Polish Motor Union (PZM). It will be held over three rounds at Toruń (16 May), Bydgoszcz (4 Jul) and Ostrów (15 Aug).

Pos.	Rider	Club	Total
1	Maciej Janowski	Wrocław	36
2	Bartosz Zmarzlik	Lublin	35
3	Kacper Woryna	Lublin	33
4	Piotr Pawlicki	Leszno	28
5	Dominik Kubera	Zielona Góra	25
6	Jakub Jamróg	Rybnik	24
7	Krzysztof Buczkowski	Bydgoszcz	22
8	Patryk Dudek	Toruń	22
9	Maksymilian Pawełczak	Bydgoszcz	22
10	Mateusz Cierniak	Lublin	22
11	Wiktor Przyjemski	Bydgoszcz	20
12	Tobiasz Musielak	Krosno	19
13	Szymon Woźniak	Bydgoszcz	18
14	Przemysław Pawlicki	Zielona Góra	18
15	Jakub Miśkowiak	Częstochowa	13
16	Jakub Krawczyk	Ostrów	11
17	Paweł Sitek	Ostrów	4
18	Radosław Kowalski	Krosno	3
19	Antoni Kawczyński	Toruń	1
20	Bartosz Jaworski	Lublin	1

=== Golden Helmet ===
The 2026 Golden Helmet organised by the Polish Motor Union (PZM) will be the first major event of the 2026 season.

- Marian Spychała Speedway Stadium, Opole, 6 April 2026

Pos.	Rider	Pts	Total
1	Kacper Woryna	2,3,3,3,3	14
2	Dominik Kubera	2,2,3,2,3	12
3	Piotr Pawlicki	3,1,2,3,2	11
4	Bartosz Zmarzlik	2,3,2,3,0	10
5	Paweł Przedpełski	2,3,2,1,1	9
6	Maciej Janowski	1,2,3,2,1	9
7	Przemysław Pawlicki	1,2,2,2,2	9
8	Damian Ratajczak	0,3,0,1,3	7
9	Mateusz Cierniak	1,2,0,3,0	6
10	Grzegorz Zengota	3,1,R,0,2	6
11	Tobiasz Musielak	0,0,3,2,0	5
12	Patryk Dudek	0,0,1,1,3	5
13	Krzysztof Buczkowski	3,0,0,1,1	5
14	Wiktor Jasiński	1,1,1,0,2	5
15	Szymon Woźniak	3,0,1,0,X	4
16	Wiktor Przyjemski	0,1,1,0,1	3

=== Criterium of Aces ===
The Mieczysław Połukard Criterium of Aces

- Polonia Bydgoszcz Stadium, Bydgoszcz, 29 March 2026

Pos.	Rider	Total
1	(Australia) Max Fricke	12
2	(Russia) Emil Sayfutdinov	11
3	(Russia) Artem Laguta	10
4	(Poland) Wiktor Przyjemski	9
5	(Latvia) Andzejs Lebedevs	9
6	(Poland) Kacper Woryna	9
7	(Poland) Maksymilian Pawełczak	8
8	(Poland) Szymon Woźniak	7
9	(Denmark) Mikkel Michelsen	7
10	(Ukraine) Aleksandr Loktaev	7
11	(Poland) Patryk Dudek	7
12	(Poland) Krzysztof Buczkowski	7
13	(United Kingdom) Tom Brennan	7
14	(Germany) Kai Huckenbeck	5
15	(Poland) Mateusz Cierniak	3
16	(Poland) Dominik Kubera	2

=== Polish U21 Championship ===
The Polish U21 Championship will be held during the season.

=== Silver Helmet ===
The Silver Helmet will be held during the season.

=== Bronze Helmet ===
The Bronze Helmet will be held during the season.

== Pairs ==
The 2026 Polish Pairs Speedway Championship (Polish: Mistrzostwa Polski par klubowych na żużlu) was the 2026 edition of the Polish Pairs Speedway Championship. It was held in Gdańsk on 4 April and was won by Motor Lublin.

Pos	Team	Riders	Pts
1	Lublin	Bartosz Zmarzlik 15, Martin Vaculík 8	23
2	Grudziądz	Michael Jepsen Jensen 12, Vadim Tarasenko 9	21
3	Leszno	Piotr Pawlicki 12, Ben Cook 7	19
4	Wrocław	Artem Laguta 13, Maciej Janowski 6	19
5	Toruń	Mikkel Michelsen 10, Emil Sayfutdinov 5, Patryk Dudek 3	18
6	Gdańsk	Tim Sørensen 10, Krystian Pieszczek 5, Miłosz Wysocki 0	15
7	Częstochowa	Jakub Miśkowiak 6, Rohan Tungate 5	11

== Team ==
The 2026 Team Speedway Polish Championship (Polish: Drużynowe mistrzostwa Polski na żużlu) is the 2026 edition of the Team Polish Championship to determine the gold medal winner (champion of Poland). Teams finishing second and third are awarded silver and bronze medals respectively.

=== Ekstraliga ===
The Ekstraliga season runs from 10 April to 4 October.

Pos	Team	P	W	D	L	BP	Pts
1	Wrocław	14	10	0	4	7	27
2	Toruń	14	10	0	4	4	24
3	Lublin	14	9	0	5	4	22
4	Leszno	14	8	0	6	5	21
5	Grudziądz	14	7	1	6	2	17
6	Gorzów	14	6	1	7	3	16
7	Zielona Góra	14	5	0	9	1	11
8	Częstochowa	14	0	0	14	0	0

Semi-finals

Team 1	Team 2	Score
Leszno	Wrocław	35–55, 45–45
Lublin	Toruń	42–48, 32–58

Third place

Team 1	Team 2	Score
Leszno	Lublin	46–44, 34–56

Final

20 September	KS Toruń; Mikkel Michelsen 14; Robert Lambert 11; Emil Sayfutdinov 11; Patryk Dudek 8 Antoni Kawczyński 5 Norick Blödorn 4 Mikołaj Duchiński 2	55–35	WTS Sparta Wrocław; Artem Laguta 10; Dan Bewley 10; Brady Kurtz 6 Maciej Janowski 4 Marcel Kowolik 3 Mikkel Andersen 2 Michał Obst DNR	MotoArena Toruń

4 October	WTS Sparta Wrocław; Artem Laguta 16; Brady Kurtz 14; Dan Bewley 8 Mikkel Andersen 3 Maciej Janowski 3 Marcel Kowolik 0 Nikodem Mikołajczyk DNR	44–46	KS Toruń; Robert Lambert 11; Emil Sayfutdinov 8 Antoni Kawczyński 7 Mikkel Michelsen 7 Norick Blödorn 6 Patryk Dudek 4 Mikołaj Duchiński 3	Olympic Stadium

Leading averages

	Rider	Team	Average
1	(Poland) Bartosz Zmarzlik	Lublin	10.26
2	(Australia) Jack Holder	Gorzów	9.81
3	(Denmark) Anders Thomsen	Gorzów	9.70
4	(Russia) Artem Laguta	Wrocław	9.46
5	(Russia) Emil Sayfutdinov	Toruń	8.96
6	(United Kingdom) Robert Lambert	Toruń	8.88
7	(Denmark) Michael Jepsen Jensen	Grudziądz	8.64
8	(Australia) Brady Kurtz	Wrocław	8.37
9	(United Kingdom) Dan Bewley	Wrocław	8.31
10	(Poland) Patryk Dudek	Toruń	8.24

=== Ekstraliga 2 ===
The Ekstraliga 2 fixtures will run from 4 April to 4 October.

Pos	Team	P	W	D	L	BP	Pts
1	Bydgoszcz	14	14	0	0	7	35
2	Poznań	14	8	1	5	3	20
3	Rybnik	14	7	0	7	5	19
4	Łódź	14	6	2	6	3	17
5	Rzeszów	14	6	2	6	3	17
6	Piła	14	4	1	9	2	11
7	Ostrów	14	4	0	10	3	11
8	Krosno	14	4	0	10	2	10

Semi-finals

Team 1	Team 2	Score
Łódź	Bydgoszcz	45–45, 33–57
Rybnik	Poznań	48–42, 39–51

Final

Team 1	Team 2	Score
Poznań	Bydgoszcz	45–45, 27–51

Leading averages

	Rider	Team	Average
1	(Australia) Ryan Douglas	Poznan	9.62
2	(Poland) Szymon Woźniak	Bydgoszcz	9.61
3	(Poland) Maksymilian Pawełczak	Bydgoszcz	9.35
4	(Czech Republic) Jan Kvěch	Rybnik	9.33
5	(Denmark) Rasmus Jensen	Rzeszów	9.14
6	(Denmark) Nicolai Klindt	Rybnik	9.05
7	(Poland) Wiktor Przyjemski	Bydgoszcz	8.92
8	(Australia) Jason Doyle	Krosno	8.63
9	(Denmark) Frederik Jakobsen	Ostrów	8.41
10	(Poland) Krzysztof Buczkowski	Bydgoszcz	8.40

=== National League ===
The National League consists of seven teams and will runs from 12 April to 20 September. Śląsk Świętochłowice were a new addition to the league, but Unia Tarnów did not return.

Pos	Team	P	W	D	L	BP	Pts
1	Gdańsk	12	8	3	1	6	25
2	Landshut (Germany)	12	8	0	4	5	21
3	Gniezno	12	6	2	4	4	18
4	Opole	12	5	1	6	3	14
5	Daugavpils (Latvia)	12	5	1	6	2	13
6	Kraków	12	2	3	7	1	8
7	Świętochłowice	12	3	0	9	0	6

Semi-finals

Team 1	Team 2	Score
Opole	Gdańsk	35–55, 34–56
Gniezno	Landshut	43–47, 43–46

Final

Team 1	Team 2	Score
Landshut	Gdańsk	39-39, 36–54

Leading averages

	Rider	Team	Average
1	(Sweden) Jacob Thorssell	Gdańsk	10.37
2	(France) David Bellego	Daugavpils	9.44
3	(Sweden) Timo Lahti	Gdańsk	9.35
4	(Sweden) Kim Nilsson	Landshut	9.18
5	(Poland) Mateusz Tonder	Świętochłowice	9.10
6	(United Kingdom) Adam Ellis	Gniezno	8.92
7	(Ukraine) Marko Levishyn	Kraków	8.66
8	(Czech Republic) Václav Milík	Opole	8.56
9	(Poland) Oskar Polis	Opole	8.40
10	(Denmark) Tim Sørensen	Gdańsk	8.30

== Squads ==
=== Ekstraliga ===
Częstochowa

- (Poland) Paweł Caban
- (Poland) Alan Ciurzyński
- (Denmark) Mads Hansen
- (Poland) Franciszek Karczewski
- (Australia) Jaimon Lidsey
- (Poland) Szymon Ludwiczak
- (Poland) Jakub Miśkowiak
- (Poland) Dawid Rozpędek
- (Poland) Bartosz Śmigielski
- (Poland) Sebastian Szostak
- (Australia) Rohan Tungate
- (Slovenia) Matej Žagar

Gorzów

- (Poland) Denis Andrzejczak
- (Czech Republic) Adam Bednář
- (Poland) Oskar Chatłas
- (Australia) Jack Holder
- (Poland) Igor Kordun
- (Poland) Kewin Nycz
- (Poland) Oskar Paluch
- (Norway) Mathias Pollestad
- (Poland) Paweł Przedpełski
- (Poland) Marcel Szymko
- (Denmark) Anders Thomsen

Grudziądz

- (Australia) Beau Bailey
- (Denmark) Emil Breum
- (Poland) Maksym Drabik
- (Australia) Max Fricke
- (Poland) Kevin Iwański-Helt
- (Denmark) Michael Jepsen Jensen
- (Poland) Kevin Małkiewicz
- (Poland) Damian Miller
- (Denmark) Bastian Pedersen
- (Poland) Jan Przanowski
- (Poland) Kacper Szarszewski
- (Russia) / (Poland) Vadim Tarasenko

Leszno

- (Australia) Ben Cook
- (Poland) Marcel Juskowiak
- (Poland) Janusz Kołodziej
- (Poland) Emil Konieczny
- (Poland) Kacper Mania
- (Ukraine) Nazar Parnitskyi
- (Poland) Piotr Pawlicki Jr.
- (Australia) Keynan Rew
- (Poland) Kuba Wojtyńka
- (Poland) Grzegorz Zengota
- (Poland) Jakub Żurek

Lublin

- (Poland) Bartosz Bańbor
- (Poland) Dawid Cepielik
- (Poland) Mateusz Cierniak
- (Poland) Bartosz Jaworski
- (Sweden) Fredrik Lindgren
- (Poland) Michał Psiuk
- (Poland) Karol Szmyd
- (Slovakia) Martin Vaculík
- (Poland) Kacper Woryna
- (Poland) Bartosz Zmarzlik

Toruń

- (Germany) Norick Blödorn
- (Poland) Bartosz Derek
- (Poland) Mikołaj Duchiński
- (Poland) Patryk Dudek
- (Denmark) Nicolai Heiselberg
- (Poland) Antoni Kawczyński
- (Sweden) Timo Lahti
- (England) Robert Lambert
- (Denmark) Mikkel Michelsen
- (Russia) / (Poland) Emil Sayfutdinov

Wrocław

- (Denmark) Mikkel Andersen
- (England) Dan Bewley
- (Poland) Maciej Janowski
- (Poland) Bartłomiej Kowalski
- (Australia) Brady Kurtz
- (Russia) / (Poland) Artem Laguta
- (Poland) Nikodem Mikołajczyk

Zielona Góra

- (Poland) Michał Curzytek
- (Poland) Eryk Farański
- (Poland) Oskar Hurysz
- (Poland) Dominik Kubera
- (Latvia) Andžejs Ļebedevs
- (Denmark) Leon Madsen
- (Australia) Mitchell McDiarmid
- (Poland) Przemysław Pawlicki
- (Poland) Damian Ratajczak
- (Poland) Kacper Witrykus

=== Ekstraliga 2 ===
Bydgoszcz

- (Poland) Kacper Andrzejewski
- (England) Tom Brennan
- (Poland) Krzysztof Buczkowski
- (Germany) Kai Huckenbeck
- (Ukraine) Aleksandr Loktaev
- (Poland) Maksymilian Pawelczak
- (Poland) Wiktor Przyjemski
- (Poland) Adam Putkowski
- (Poland) Szymon Woźniak

Krosno

- (Poland) Szymon Bandur
- (United States) Luke Becker
- (Denmark) Marcus Birkemose
- (Poland) Robert Chmeil
- (Australia) Jason Doyle
- (Poland) Kacper Dudek
- (Poland) Kamil Kawecki
- (Poland) Radosław Kowalski
- (Poland) Oskar Kręglicki
- (Hungary) Zoltán Lovas
- (Poland) Tobiasz Musielak
- (Poland) Arkadiusz Wąchała
- (Poland) Jakub Wieszczak

Łódź

- (Sweden) Oliver Berntzon
- (Australia) Zach Cook
- (Poland) Kacper Halkiewicz
- (Poland) Krzysztof Lewandowski
- (Denmark) Villads Nagel
- (Poland) Marcin Nowak
- (Poland) Seweryn Orgacki
- (Poland) Tomasz Szeląg
- (Poland) Szymon Szlauderbach
- (England) Dan Thompson
- (Poland) Kacper Zieliński

Ostrów

- (Russia) / (Poland) Gleb Chugunov
- (Australia) Chris Holder
- (Denmark) Frederik Jakobsen
- (Poland) Jakub Krawczyk
- (Poland) Filip Seniuk
- (Poland) Pawel Sitek
- (Poland) Gracjan Szostak
- (England) Tai Woffinden

Piła

- (Poland) Dominik Baryłka
- (Denmark) Benjamin Basso
- (Poland) Adrian Cyfer
- (Denmark) William Drejer
- (Poland) Wiktor Jasinski
- (Poland) Norbert Kościuch
- (Poland) Emil Maroszek
- (Poland) Tobias J Musielak
- (Denmark) Matias Nielsen
- (Poland) Piotr Piotrowski-Prędki
- (Poland) Kacper Teska

Poznań

- (Australia) Alexander Adamson
- (France) Dimitri Bergé
- (Australia) Ryan Douglas
- (Poland) Stanisław Ignaszak
- (Denmark) Niels Kristian Iversen
- (Poland) Kacper Pludra
- (Poland) Rafał Romaniak
- (Poland) Bartosz Smektała

Rybnik

- (Poland) Jakub Jamróg
- (Denmark) Jesper Knudsen
- (Czech Republic) Jan Kvěch
- (Poland) Wiktor Lampart
- (Poland) Kacper Tkocz
- (Poland) Patryk Wojdyło
- (Poland) Pawel Wyczyszczok

Rzeszów

- (Poland) Maksym Borowiak
- (Poland) Oskar Fajfer
- (Poland) Kryspin Jarosz
- (Denmark) Rasmus Jensen
- (Poland) Andreas Lyager
- (Poland) Franciszek Majewski
- (Poland) Adrian Przybyło
- (England) Anders Rowe
- (Poland) Krzyzstof Sadurski
- (Poland) Patryk Surowiec
- (Poland) Mateusz Szczepaniak

=== National League ===
Daugavpils

- (France) David Bellego
- (Latvia) Damir Filimonovs
- (Denmark) Esben Hjerrild
- (Latvia) Nikita Kaulin
- (England) Drew Kemp
- (Denmark) Jonas Knudsen
- (Latvia) Daniils Kolodinskis
- (Latvia) Jevgeņijs Kostigovs
- (Latvia) Oļegs Mihailovs
- (Australia) Nick Morris

Gdańsk

- (France) Steven Goret
- (Sweden) Casper Henriksson
- (Denmark) Niklas Holm Jakobsen
- (Poland) Mikołaj Krok
- (Poland) Jakub Malina
- (Australia) Josh Pickering
- (Poland) Krystian Pieszczek
- (Denmark) Tim Sørensen
- (Sweden) Jacob Thorssell
- (Poland) Miłosz Wysocki

Gniezno

- (Argentina) Alex Acuna
- (Poland) Patryk Budniak
- (United Kingdom) Adam Ellis
- (Poland) Kevin Fajfer
- (Slovenia) Anže Grmek
- (Denmark) Jacob Jensen
- (Poland) Norbert Krakowiak
- (Poland) Mateusz Latała
- (Australia) Sam Masters
- (Denmark) Kevin Juhl Pedersen
- (Poland) Robert Roszak
- (Poland) Adrian Saks

Kraków

- (Poland) Miłosz Duda
- (England) Richard Lawson
- (Poland) Dawid Rempala
- (Denmark) Nicolai Klindt
- (Ukraine) Marko Levishyn
- (Poland) Paweł Miesiąc
- (Ukraine) Stanislav Melnychuk
- (Denmark) Nicki Pedersen
- (Australia) Michael West

Landshut

- (Italy) Paco Castagna
- (Germany) Lukas Fienhage
- (England) Leon Flint
- (Germany) Mario Häusl
- (Sweden) Kim Nilsson
- (Germany) Erik Riss
- (Germany) Kevin Wölbert
- (England) Charles Wright

Opole

- (Poland) Jakub Fabisz
- (Denmark) Patrick Hansen
- (Denmark) Jonas Jeppesen
- (Poland) Hubert Łęgowik
- (Poland) Dastin Łukaszczyk
- (Czech Republic) Václav Milík
- (Poland) Oskar Polis
- (Poland) Oskar Stępień
- (Sweden) Mathias Thörnblom

Świętochłowice

- (Denmark) Bastian Borke
- (Italy) Matteo Boncinelli
- (Poland) Jędrzej Chmura
- (Poland) Adrian Gała
- (Poland) Kacper Grzelak
- (England) Luke Harrison
- (Germany) Sebastian Kössler
- (Poland) Tomasz Orwat
- (Ukraine) Andriy Rozaliuk
- (Poland) Bartosz Szymura
- (Denmark) Rune Thorst
- (Poland) Mateusz Tonder

Tarnów

- (Australia) Fraser Bowes
- (Poland) Adrian Gorzkowski
- (Poland) Igor Gryzło
- (England) Kyle Howarth
- (Slovenia) Matic Ivačič
- (Poland) Sebastian Madej
- (Poland) Bartosz Nowak
- (Ukraine) Viktor Trofimov Jr.
