= 2026 Danish speedway season =

Season of speedway in Denmark

The 2026 Danish Speedway season is the 2026 season of motorcycle speedway in Denmark.

Eight teams declared for the 2026 Danish Speedway League, with the addition of Nordjysk Elite Speedway (Brovst) who returned to the top flight after a five-year absence following their tumultuous 2022 season.

Slangerup are the defending champions.

== Individual ==
=== Danish Individual Championship ===
The 2026 Danish Individual Speedway Championship was the 2026 edition of the Danish Individual Speedway Championship. It took place on June 17 at the Granly Speedway Arena in Esbjerg and was won by Leon Madsen.

| Pos. | Rider | Club | Pts | Total |
|---|---|---|---|---|
| 1 | Leon Madsen | Unattached | 1, 3, 3, 2, 3 + 3 | 15 |
| 2 | Frederik Jakobsen | Fjelsted | 3, 1, 3, 2, 2 + 2 | 13 |
| 3 | Michael Jepsen Jensen | Slangerup | 2, 3, 3, 3, 1 + 1 | 12 |
| 4 | Anders Thomsen | SES | 1, 0, 3, 3, 3, + 0 | 11 |
| 5 | Mikkel Michelsen | Slangerup | 3, 3, 1, 3, 0 | 10 |
| 6 | Nicolai Klindt | Holsted | 3, W, 2, 3, 2 | 10 |
| 7 | Jonas Seifert-Salk | Grinsted | 1, 3, 2, 1, 3 | 10 |
| 8 | Nicolai Heiselberg | Region Varde | 2, 2, 2, 0, 3 | 9 |
| 9 | Bastian Pedersen | Holsted | 2, 2, 1, 1, T | 6 |
| 10 | Matias Nielsen | Esbjerg | 3, 2, 0, 0, 0 | 5 |
| 11 | Jacob D. Jensen | Fjelsted | 0, 2, 0, 2, 1 | 5 |
| 12 | Andreas Lyager | Slangerup | 0, 0, 2, 2, 1 | 5 |
| 13 | Benjamin Basso | Fjelsted | 1, 1, 0, 1, 2 | 5 |
| 14 | Jonas Knudsen | Holsted | 2, 1, 1, 1, D | 5 |
| 15 | Tim Sørensen (res) | Region Varde | -, 1, -, 0, 2 | 3 |
| 16 | Niklas Holm Jakobsen | SES | 0, 0, 0, 0, 1 | 1 |
| 17 | Michael Thyme (res) | Esbjerg | -, 1, 0, -, 0 | 1 |
| 18 | Rasmus Jensen | Holsted | 0, -, -, -, - | 0 |

=== U21 Championship ===
The Danish Under 21 Individual Speedway Championship will be the 2026 edition of the Danish U21 Individual Speedway Championship.

| Pos. | Rider | Club | Pts |
|---|---|---|---|
| 1 | | | |
| 2 | | | |
| 3 | | | |
| 4 | | | |
| 5 | | | |
| 6 | | | |
| 7 | | | |
| 8 | | | |
| 9 | | | |
| 10 | | | |
| 11 | | | |
| 12 | | | |
| 13 | | | |
| 14 | | | |
| 15 | | | |
| 16 | | | |

== Team ==
=== SpeedwayLigaen ===
Eight teams will compete in the SpeedwayLigaen consisting of a round robin of fixtures from 22 April to 26 August, to determine the league placings for the semi-final and super final rounds.

==== League table ====
| Pos | Team | P | W | D | L | Pts | BP | Total |
|---|---|---|---|---|---|---|---|---|
| 1 | Slangerup | | | | | | | |
| 2 | Sønderjylland | | | | | | | |
| 3 | Holsted Tigers | | | | | | | |
| 4 | Grindsted | | | | | | | |
| 5 | Esbjerg Vikings | | | | | | | |
| 6 | Team Fjelsted | | | | | | | |
| 7 | Region Varde | | | | | | | |
| 8 | Nordjysk | | | | | | | |

Semi-finals (teams ranked 3–6, 16 Sep)

| Pos | Team | Score | Scorers |
|---|---|---|---|
| 1 | | | |
| 2 | | | |
| 3 | | | |
| 4 | | | |

Super Final (23 Sep)

| Pos | Team | Score | Scorers |
|---|---|---|---|
| 1 | | | |
| 2 | | | |
| 3 | | | |
| 4 | | | |

== Squads ==
=== SpeedwayLigaen ===
Esbjerg

- (Denmark) Nicklas Aagaard
- (United States) Luke Becker
- (Australia) Fraser Bowes
- (Denmark) Emil Breum
- (Australia) Jason Doyle
- (Denmark) Niels Kristian Iversen
- (Poland) Kacper Mania
- (Denmark) Matias Nielsen
- (Russia) Emil Sayfutdinov
- (Denmark) Michael Thyme

Fjelsted

- (Denmark) Benjamin Basso
- (Poland) Robert Chmiel
- (United Kingdom) Adam Ellis
- (Denmark) Frederik Jakobsen
- (Poland) Maciej Janowski
- (Denmark) Jacob D. Jensen
- (Denmark) Peter Kildemand
- (Denmark) Patrick Kruse
- (Australia) Keynan Rew
- (Denmark) Rune Thorst

Grindsted

- (Czech Republic) Adam Bednar
- (Denmark) Kenneth Bjerre
- (Australia) Ryan Douglas
- (Denmark) Villads Nagel
- (Denmark) Andreas Olsen
- (Poland) Przemysław Pawlicki
- (Poland) Oscar Polis
- (Norway) Mathias Pollestad
- (Denmark) Jonas Seifert-Salk
- (Denmark) Tim Sørensen

Holsted

- (Latvia) Francis Gusts
- (Denmark) Rasmus Jensen
- (Denmark) Nicolai Klindt
- (Denmark) Jonas Knudsen
- (Australia) Brady Kurtz
- (Czech Republic) Jan Kvěch
- (Denmark) Bastian Pedersen
- (Sweden) Jacob Thorssell

Nordjysk

- (Denmark) Dimitri Buch
- (Denmark) Rasmus Funch-Larsen
- (Denmark) Kenneth Kruse Hansen
- (Denmark) Esben Hjerrild
- (Sweden) Thomas H. Jonasson
- (Finland) Timo Lahti
- (Ukraine) Marko Levishyn
- (England) Richard Lawson
- (Denmark) Frederik Pedersen
- (Denmark) Tobias Thomsen
- (Australia) Rohan Tungate

Region Varde

- (Australia) Beau Bailey
- (England) Dan Bewley
- (Russia) Gleb Chugunov
- (Poland) Mateusz Cierniak
- (Denmark) Nicolai Heiselberg
- (Denmark) Jonas Jeppesen
- (Sweden) Fredrik Lindgren
- (Denmark) Villads Pedersen

SES

- (Denmark) Mikkel Andersen
- (Denmark) Mads Hansen
- (Denmark) Niklas Holm Jakobsen
- (Denmark) Jesper Knudsen
- (Latvia) Andžejs Ļebedevs
- (Poland) Sebastian Szostak
- (Denmark) Anders Thomsen

Slangerup

- (Denmark) Mikkel Bach
- (Denmark) Marcus Birkemose
- (Denmark) William Drejer
- (Poland) Patryk Dudek
- (Australia) Chris Holder
- (Denmark) Michael Jepsen Jensen
- (Denmark) Kevin Juhl Pedersen
- (Poland) Bartłomiej Kowalski
- (Denmark) Andreas Lyager
- (Denmark) Mikkel Michelsen
- (Poland) Maksymillian Pawelczak
