= 2025 Danish speedway season =

Season of speedway in Denmark

The 2025 Danish Speedway season is the 2025 season of motorcycle speedway in Denmark.

The same seven teams as in 2024 declared their place in the 2025 Danish Speedway League. Slangerup are the defending champions.

Slangerup finished top of the regular season table and then successfully retained the title by winning the Super Final on 24 September.

== Individual ==
=== Danish Individual Championship ===
The 2025 Danish Individual Speedway Championship was the 2025 edition of the Danish Individual Speedway Championship. The event was held at the Brovst Speedway Center in Brovst on 25 June. The defending champion was Anders Thomsen.

Pos.	Rider	Club	Pts	Total
1	Michael Jepsen Jensen	Slangerup	2, 3, 3, 3, 2	13+3
2	Anders Thomsen	SES	3, 2, 3, 2, 3	13+2
3	Jonas Knudsen	Holsted	3, 2, 3, 3, 3	14+1
4	Niels Kristian Iversen	Esbjerg	2, 0, 3, 3, 3	11+W
5	Mikkel Michelsen	Slangerup	3, 3, 1, 2, 2	11
6	Tim Sørensen	Region Varde	3, 1, 2, 1, 2	9
7	Benjamin Basso	Fjelsted	0, 3, 2, 2, 1	8
8	Mads Hansen	SES	0, 2, 1, 3, D	6
9	William Drejer	Slangerup	1, 3, 1, 1, 0	6
10	Frederik Jakobsen	Fjelsted	1, 0, 2, 2, 1	6
11	Andreas Lyager	Slangerup	2, 1, 2, 0, 0	5
12	Rune Thorst	Fjelsted	1, 1, 0, 1, 2	5
13	Matias Nielsen	Esbjerg	1, 2, 0, 0, 1	4
14	Mikkel Andersen	SES	2, 1, 0, 1, 0	4
15	Jonas Jeppesen	Esbjerg	0, 0, 0, 0, 3	3
16	Villads Nagel	Grindsted	W, 0, 1, 0, 1	2

=== U21 Championship ===
The Danish Under 21 Individual Speedway Championship was held at Slangerup on 11 August 2025.

Pos.	Rider	Club	Pts
1	Mikkel Andersen	SES	16
2	William Drejer	Slangerup	16
3	Nicolai Heiselberg	Region Varde	13
4	Jesper Knudsen	SES	11
5	Niklas Holm Jakobsen	Esbjerg	11
6	Villads Nagel	Glumsø	10
7	Jacob Jensen	Fjelsted	10
8	Patrick Kruse	Glumsø	7
9	Rasmus Pedersen	Fjelsted	7
10	Villads Pedersen	SES	6
11	Dimitri Buch	Holsted	5
12	Andreas Olsen	Esbjerg	5
13	Sebastian Mayland	Glumsø	4
14	Philip Ekfeldt	Fjelsted	3
15	Christian L. Rasmussen	Holsted	2
16	Chris Wænnerstrøm (res)	Esbjerg	0
17	Hjalte Nygaard	Holstebro	0

== Team ==
=== SpeedwayLigaen ===
Seven teams competed in the SpeedwayLigaen consisting of a round robin of fixtures from 23 April to 3 September, that determined the league placings for the semi-final and super final rounds.

==== League table ====
Pos	Team	P	W	D	L	Pts	BP	Total
1	Slangerup	12	10	0	2	20	6	26
2	Sønderjylland Elite Speedway	12	9	0	3	18	4	22
3	Holsted Tigers	12	8	0	4	16	4	20
4	Grindsted	12	7	0	5	14	2	16
5	Esbjerg Vikings	12	3	1	8	7	2	9
6	Team Fjelsted	12	3	1	8	7	2	9
7	Region Varde	12	1	0	11	2	0	2

Semi-finals (teams ranked 3–6, 17 Sep)

Pos	Team	Score	Scorers
1	Grindsted	40	Nagel 14, Prz. Pawlicki 12 Pollestad 10, K.Bjerre 3, Wojdylo 1
2	Holsted	31	Thorssell 10, R.Jensen 7, J.Knudsen 5, Lahti 5, B.Pedersen 4
3	Fjelsted	31	Basso 9, N.Pedersen 9, Cierniak 8, Kildemand 3, Thorst 2
4	Esbjerg	29	Doyle 15, Matias Nielsen 7, Iversen 5, Becker 2, Aagaard 0

Super Final (24 Sep)

Pos	Team	Score	Scorers
1	Slangerup	49	Jepsen Jensen 13, Dudek 11, Michelsen 11, Drejer 8, Birkemose 6
2	SES	35	Thomsen 12, Lebedevs 10, M.Hansen 6, M.Andersen 4, J.Knudsen 3
3	Holsted	29	Thorssell 15, R.Jensen 6, J.Knudsen 4, Lahti 3, B.Pedersen 1
4	Grindsted	19	Prz. Pawlicki 7, Nagel 6, K. Bjerre 3, Pollestad 2, Wojdylo 2

== Squads ==
=== SpeedwayLigaen ===
Esbjerg

- (Denmark) Nicklas Aagaard
- (United States) Luke Becker
- (Australia) Jason Doyle
- (Denmark) Niels Kristian Iversen
- (Denmark) Niklas Holm Jakobsen
- (Denmark) Jonas Jeppesen
- (Denmark) Matias Nielsen
- (Denmark) Andreas Olsen
- (Poland) Bartosz Smektała
- (Poland) Grzegorz Zengota

Fjelsted

- (Denmark) Benjamin Basso
- (France) David Bellego
- (Poland) Mateusz Cierniak
- (Denmark) Frederik Jakobsen
- (Denmark) Sam Jensen
- (Denmark) Peter Kildemand
- (Denmark) Nicki Pedersen
- (Denmark) Rasmus Pedersen
- (Denmark) Rune Thorst

Grindsted

- (Denmark) Kenneth Bjerre
- (Poland) Robert Chmiel
- (Poland) Jakub Krawczyk
- (Poland) Piotr Pawlicki Jr.
- (Poland) Przemysław Pawlicki
- (Denmark) Villads Nagel
- (Norway) Mathias Pollestad
- (Poland) Bartosz Smektała
- (Poland) Patryk Wojdyło

Holsted

- (Denmark) René Bach
- (Denmark) Dimitri Buch
- (Denmark) Rasmus Jensen
- (Denmark) Jonas Knudsen
- (Finland) Timo Lahti
- (Denmark) Kevin Juhl Pedersen
- (Denmark) Bastian Pedersen
- (Sweden) Jacob Thorssell

Region Varde

- (France) Dimitri Bergé
- (Germany) Norick Blödorn
- (Russia) Gleb Chugunov
- (Denmark) Nicolai Heiselberg
- (Denmark) Nicolai Klindt
- (Denmark) Tim Sørensen
- (Russia) Vadim Tarasenko
- (Slovenia) Matej Žagar

SES

- (Denmark) Mikkel Andersen
- (Latvia) Francis Gusts
- (Denmark) Mads Hansen
- (Denmark) Patrick Hansen
- (Denmark) Esben Hjerrild
- (Denmark) Jesper Knudsen
- (Latvia) Andžejs Ļebedevs
- (Ukraine) Nazar Parnitskyi
- (Denmark) Anders Thomsen

Slangerup

- (Denmark) Marcus Birkemose
- (Denmark) William Drejer
- (Poland) Patryk Dudek
- (Australia) Chris Holder
- (Denmark) Michael Jepsen Jensen
- (Poland) Bartłomiej Kowalski
- (Denmark) Andreas Lyager
- (Denmark) Mikkel Michelsen
- (Poland) Paweł Przedpełski
- (Denmark) Jonas Seifert-Salk
