= 2023 SGP2 =

World speedway event

World Under 21 Championship

The 2023 SGP2 series was the 47th edition of the FIM Individual Under-21 World Championship. It was staged as the SGP2 class of the FIM Speedway Grand Prix series after rights holders Discovery Sports Events took over promotional rights of the competition in 2022.

The three qualifying rounds were staged at Krško, Pardubice and Vojens on 20 May. Four qualifiers from each qualifying heat progressed to the main event. Three wildcards were chosen for the main event, in addition to the 12 qualifiers; they were Mathias Pollestad, Anže Grmek and Petr Chlupáč.

Poland's Mateusz Cierniak won the title for the second season running, becoming only the fourth rider to win multiple Under-21 World Championship titles after Emil Sayfutdinov, Darcy Ward and Maksym Drabik. Damian Ratajczak took second with Bartłomiej Kowalski completing an all-Polish podium.

== Qualifying ==
The 2023 season consisted of three qualifying events. Emil Breum, Keynan Rew and Esben Hjerrild won the qualifying rounds.

QR2 Krško
Pos	Rider	Pts
1	(Denmark) Emil Breum	15
2	(Germany) Norick Blödorn	14
3	(Poland) Mateusz Cierniak	13
4	(Sweden) Gustav Grahn	11
5	(Denmark) Bastian Borke	10
6	(Slovenia) Anže Grmek	10
7	(Czech Republic) Petr Chlupáč	9
8	(France) Mathias Trésarrieu	7
9	(England) Leon Flint	7
10	(Australia) Maurice Brown	6
11	(Australia) Jacob Hook	5
12	(Hungary) Richárd Füzesi	3
13	(Italy) Matteo Boncinelli	3
14	(Ukraine) Mykhailo Tymoshchuk	3
15	(Slovenia) Julian Kuny	2
16	(Ukraine) Roman Kapustin	1
17	(Germany) Patricia Erhart	1

QR1 Pardubice
Pos	Rider	Pts
1	(Australia) Keynan Rew	13
2	(Poland) Bartłomiej Kowalski	12
3	(Sweden) Casper Henriksson	11+3
4	(Denmark) Nicolai Heiselberg	11+2
5	(Ukraine) Nazar Parnitskyi	10
6	(Latvia) Ernest Matjuszonok	10
7	(England) Drew Kemp	9
8	(England) Dan Gilkes	8
9	(Czech Republic) Daniel Klíma	7
10	(Austria) Sebastian Kossler	6
11	(Latvia) Ričards Ansviesulis	6
12	(Germany) Erik Bachhuber	5
13	(Czech Republic) Jan Jenicek	4
14	(France) Tino Bouin	3
15	(Czech Republic) Matouš Kameník	3
16	(Czech Republic) Bruno Belan	1
17	(Czech Republic) Matěj Frýza	1

QR3 Vojens
Pos	Rider	Pts
1	(Denmark) Esben Hjerrild	13+3
2	(Sweden) Philip Hellström Bängs	13+2
3	(Latvia) Francis Gusts	11
4	(Poland) Damian Ratajczak	11
5	(Norway) Mathias Pollestad	11
6	(Poland) Kacper Pludra	11
7	(England) Anders Rowe	11
8	(Czech Republic) Jaroslav Vaníček	9
9	(Denmark) Jesper Knudsen	8
10	(Sweden) Ludvig Selvin	7
11	(Norway) Espen Sola	5
12	(Australia) James Pearson	4
13	(United States) Alex Martin	2
14	(Germany) Marlon Hegener	2
15	(Latvia) Artjams Juhno	2
16	(Germany) Jonny Wynant	0

In addition to the 12 qualifiers, Anže Grmek, Mathias Pollestad and Petr Chlupáč were named as series wildcards.

== Main event ==
The 2023 season consisted of three rounds.

Round	Date	Venue	Winner
1	2 June	(Czech Republic) Markéta Stadium, Prague	(Poland) Mateusz Cierniak
2	23 June	(Poland) Edward Jancarz Stadium, Gorzów	(Poland) Mateusz Cierniak
3	15 September	(Denmark) Vojens Speedway Center, Vojens	(Poland) Damian Ratajczak

== Final Classification ==
Pos.	Rider	Points	(Czech Republic)	(Poland)	(Denmark)
Gold	(Poland) (842) Mateusz Cierniak	49	20	20	9
Silver	(Poland) (523) Damian Ratajczak	45	16	9	20
Bronze	(Poland) (302) Bartłomiej Kowalski	42	18	12	12
4	(Australia) (27) Keynan Rew	41	12	18	11
5	(Sweden) (43) Casper Henriksson	33	1	14	18
6	(Norway) (999) Mathias Pollestad	29	14	8	7
7	(Sweden) (243) Philip Hellström Bängs	27	7	10	10
8	(Denmark) (118) Emil Breum	26	10	16	0
9	(Germany) (33) Norick Blödorn	21	6	11	4
10	(Latvia) (140) Francis Gusts	20	–	6	14
11	(Denmark) (63) Nicolai Heiselberg	18	5	5	8
12	(Denmark) (17) William Drejer	16	–	–	16
13	(Denmark) (94) Esben Hjerrild	13	8	4	1
14	(Sweden) (118) Gustav Grahn	12	11	1	–
15	(United Kingdom) (111) Anders Rowe	9	9	–	–
16	(Czech Republic) (44) Petr Chlupáč	8	3	2	3
17	(Poland) (16) Oskar Paluch	7	–	7	–
18	(Slovenia) (226) Anže Grmek	7	2	3	2
19	(Denmark) (18) Bastian Pedersen	6	–	–	6
20	(Denmark) (16) Jesper Knudsen	5	–	–	5
21	(Czech Republic) (16) Daniel Klíma	4	4	–	–
22	(Ukraine) (785) Nazar Parnitskyi	0	–	–	0

== See also ==
- 2023 Speedway Grand Prix
- 2023 Team Junior World Championship
