= 2023 Danish speedway season =

Season of speedway in Denmark

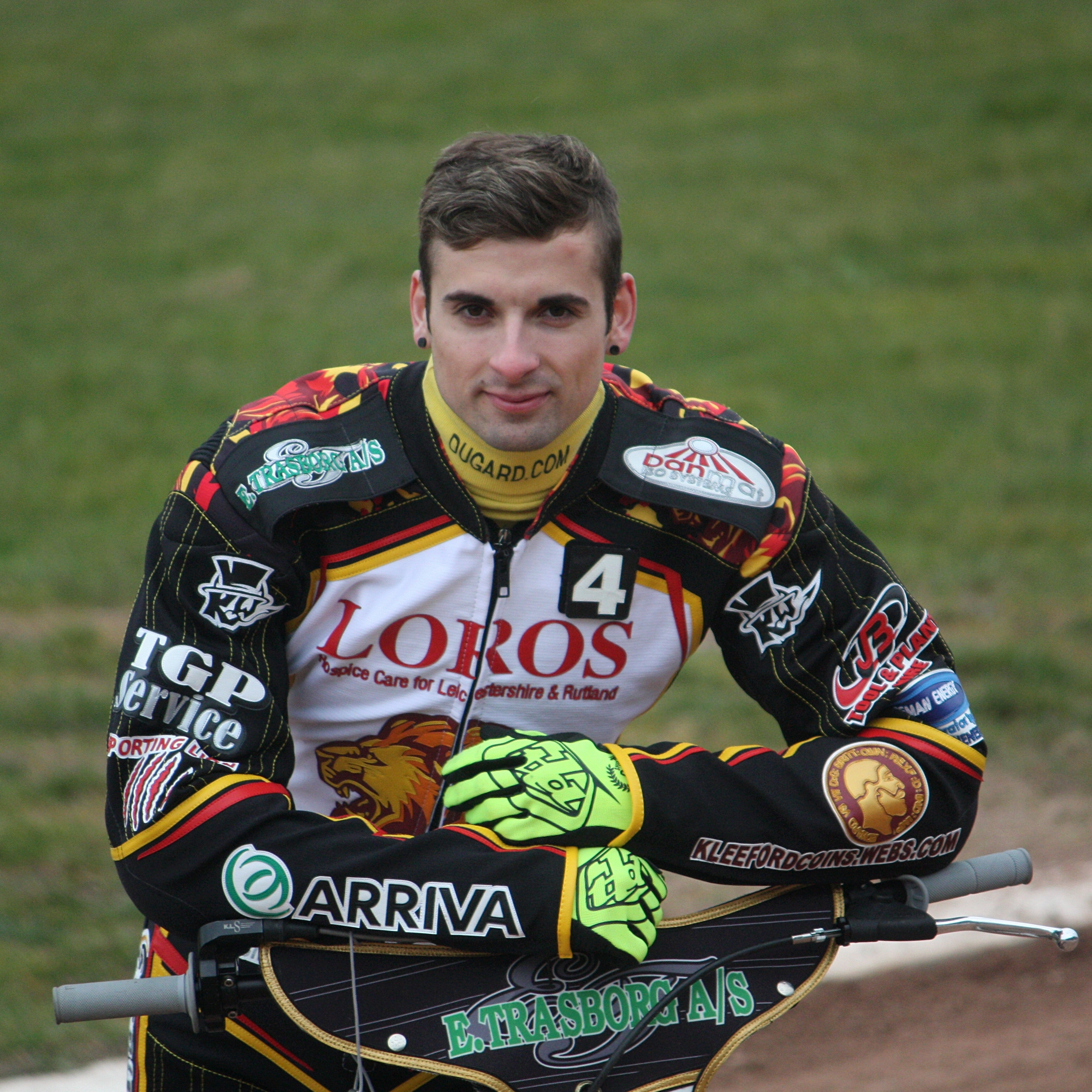
- Mikkel Michelsen won the Danish Championship for the first time

The 2023 Danish Speedway season was the 2023 season of motorcycle speedway in Denmark.

== Individual ==
=== Danish Individual Championship ===
The 2023 Danish Individual Speedway Championship was the 2023 edition of the Danish Individual Speedway Championship. The final was held at the Slangerup Speedway Center on 21 June 2023. Mikkel Michelsen won the title on his home track.

Pos.	Rider	Points	Total
1	Mikkel Michelsen (Slangerup)	3, 3, 2, 3, 3, +3	17
2	Mads Hansen (SES)	3, 1, 1, 1, 3, +2	11
3	Patrick Hansen (Grindsted)	1, 2, 3, 3, 1, +1	11
4	Kenneth Bjerre (Grindsted)	3, 3, 1, 3, 0, +0	10
5	Niels Kristian Iversen (Esbjerg)	2, 0, 2, 3, 2	9
6	Jonas Seifert-Salk (Slangerup)	2, 2, 3, 0, 2	9
7	Jonas Jeppesen (Esbjerg)	3, 2, 1, 1, 2	9
8	Rasmus Jensen (Holsted)	0, 1, 2, 2, 3	8
9	Nicolai Klindt (SES)	1, W, 3, 0, 3	7
10	Anders Thomsen (SES)	1, 3, 0, 2, 1	7
11	Frederik Jakobsen (Region Varde)	0, 1, 3, 1, 2	7
12	Benjamin Basso (SES)	2, 2, 1, 2, 0	7
13	Michael Jepsen Jensen (Slangerup)	1, 3, D, 0, -	4
14	René Bach (Holsted)	0, 0, 2, 2, 0	4
15	Leon Madsen (Unattached)	2, 0, W, -, -	2
16	Peter Kildemand (Fjelsted)	0, 0, 0, 1, W	1
17	Kevin Juhl Pedersen (Grindsted) (res)	-, -, 0, -, 1	1
18	Kenneth Hansen (Slangerup) (res)	-, 1, -, -, W	1

=== Grand Prix Qualifier ===
The 2023 Danish Grand Prix Qualifier was the 2023 edition of the Danish qualifier for the 2024 Speedway Grand Prix. The final was held at Vojens on 5 April and the top four riders qualified for the 2024 Speedway Grand Prix Qualification stage.

Pos.	Rider	Points	Total
1	Frederik Jakobsen	3, 3, 3, 3, 2	14
2	Michael Jepsen Jensen	3, 3, 2, 2, 3	13
3	Mads Hansen	1, 3, 3, 1, 3	11
4	Niels-Kristian Iversen	0, 3, 2, 2, 3	10+3
5	Andreas Lyager	2, 1, 2, 3, 2	10+2
6	Patrick Hansen	1, 2, 1, 3, 0	7
7	Jonas Seifert-Salk	3, 1, 1, 0, 2	7
8	Nicolai Klindt	2, 1, 3, 0, 1	7
9	Tim Sørensen	2, F, 1, 2, 2	7
10	Matias Nielsen	3, 0, 2, 1, 0	6
11	Benjamin Basso	0, 2, 0, 1, 3	6
12	Rasmus Jensen	2, 2, 0, 1, 1	6
13	Jesper Knudsen	1, 1, 0, 3, R	5
14	Emil Breum	1, 0, 3, 0, 0	4
15	René Bach	X, 0, 1, 2, 1	4
16	Peter Kildemand	0, 2, X, 0, 1	3
17	Sam Jensen (res)	0, -, -, -, -	0
	Jonas Knudsen (res)		DNR

=== U21 Championship ===
Emil Breum won the Under 21 Championship.

Pos.	Rider	Points
1	Emil Breum	13+3
2	Esben Hjerrild	13+2
3	William Drejer	13
4	Nicolai Heiselberg	13
5	Bastian Pedersen	11
6	Nicklas Aagaard	8
7	Rasmus Pedersen	8
8	Chris Waennerstrom	7
9	Niklas H. Jakobsen	7
10	Villads Nagel	6
11	Thomas Kring	6
12	Jesper Knudsen	5
13	Patrick Baek	4
14	Viktor Larsen	3
15	Patrick Skaarup	2
16	Oliver Sorensen	0
17	Martin Ovig (res)	0
18	Rasmus Funch-Larsen (res)	0

== Team ==
=== Danish Speedway League ===
Seven teams competed in a round robin of fixtures from 19 April to 30 August, to determine the league placings for the semi-final and super final rounds. Esbjerg Vikings won the Danish title for 11th time.

Pos	Team	P	W	D	L	BP	Pts
1	SES	12	9	0	3	6	24
2	Esbjerg Vikings	12	8	2	2	4	22
3	Grindsted	12	7	1	4	4	19
4	Slangerup	12	5	2	5	3	15
5	Region Varde	12	5	0	7	2	12
6	Holsted Tigers	12	4	0	8	2	10
7	Team Fjelsted	12	1	1	10	0	3

Semi-finals (teams ranked 3–6) 6 Sep

Pos	Team	Score	Scorers
1	Slangerup	41	Michelsen 13, Lyager 12, Seifert-Salk 7, Drejer 5, Rew 4
2	Holsted	36	Jensen 11, N Pedersen 11, Bach 9, B Pedersen 5, Vissing 0
3	Grindsted	30	Pawlicki 10, Bjerre 9, Zagar 6, Thorst 3, Wölbert 2
4	Region Varde	25	Sørensen 9, Jakobsen 5, Zengota 4, Heiselberg 4, Lahti 3

Super Final (20 Sep)

Pos	Team	Score	Scorers
1	Esbjerg	36	Becker 11, Nielsen 9, Iversen 8, Jeppesen 7, Breum 1
2	SES	34	Madsen 14, Basso 13, Hansen 5, Knudsen 1, Andersen 1
3	Slangerup	32	Michelsen 12, Lyager 11, Seifert-Salk 5, Rew 4, Drejer 0
4	Holsted	29	Jensen 13, B Pedersen 9, N Pedersen 4, Bach 2, KJ Pedersen 1

== Teams ==
Esbjerg

- Luke Becker
- Emil Breum
- Niels Kristian Iversen
- Jonas Jeppesen
- Andreas Kaag Jensen
- Jonas Knudsen
- Matias Nielsen
- Chris Wænnerstrøm

Fjelsted

- Hans Andersen
- Kasper Andersen
- Adam Ellis
- Thomas Jørgensen
- Peter Kildemand
- Norbert Krakowiak
- Andžejs Ļebedevs
- Marius Nielsen
- Rasmus Pedersen
- Stian Vithen

Grindsted

- Kenneth Bjerre
- Francis Gusts
- Patrick Hansen
- Esben Hjerrild
- Nick Morris
- Przemyslaw Pawlicki
- Kevin Juhl Pedersen
- Emil Pørtner
- Rune Thorst
- Kevin Wölbert
- Matej Žagar

Holsted

- Nicklas Aagaard
- René Bach
- Patrick Bæk
- Lasse Bjerre
- Rasmus Jensen
- Bastian Pedersen
- Kevin Juhl Pedersen
- Nicki Pedersen
- Claus Vissing

Region Varde

- Norick Blödorn
- Nicolai Heiselberg
- Frederik Jakobsen
- Sam Jensen
- Timo Lahti
- Michael Palm Toft
- Josh Pickering
- Tim Sørensen
- Antti Vuolas
- Grzegorz Zengota

SES

- Mikkel Andersen
- Benjamin Basso
- Oliver Berntzon
- Adrian Gala
- Mads Hansen
- Nicolai Klindt
- Jesper Knudsen
- Leon Madsen
- Jannik Sørensen
- Anders Thomsen

Slangerup

- Bastian Borke
- William Drejer
- Kenneth Kruse Hansen
- Andreas Lyager
- Mikkel Michelsen
- Michael Jepsen Jensen
- Vilads Nagel
- Oskar Polis
- Keynan Rew
- Timi Salonen
- Jonas Seifert-Salk
- Patrick Skaarup
