= 2022 Danish speedway season =

Season of speedway in Denmark

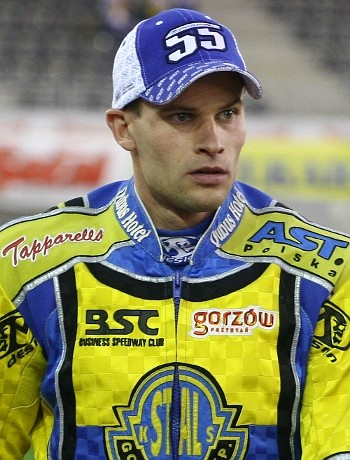
- Matej Žagar helped SES win the Danish league title.

The 2022 Danish Speedway season was the 2022 season of speedway in Denmark.

== Individual ==
=== Individual Championship ===
The 2022 Danish Individual Speedway Championship was the 2022 edition of the Danish Individual Speedway Championship. The final was held at the Holsted Speedway Center on 20 June 2022. Rasmus Jensen won the title on his home track.

Pos.	Rider	Points	Details
1	Rasmus Jensen (Holsted)	17	(3, 3, 3, 3, 3, +2)
2	Anders Thomsen (Sønderjylland)	16	(3, 3, 2, 2, 3, +3)
3	Kenneth Bjerre (Grindsted)	14	(2, 3, 2, 3, 3, +1)
4	Lasse Bjerre (Holsted)	9	(3, 0, 3, 1, 2)
	Andreas Lyager (Slangerup)	9	(2, 2, 1, 3, 1)
6	Patrick Hansen (Glumso)	8	(0, 3, 3, 2, 0)
	Kenneth Hansen (Slangerup)	8	(2, 1, 2, 0, 3)
	Frederik Jakobsen (Fjelsted)	8	(3, 2, 0, 1, 2)
	Jonas Seifert-Salk (Slangerup)	8	(0, 1, 3, 2, 2)
10	Jonas Jeppesen (Esbjerg)	7	(1, 2, 2, 2, 0)
	Niels Kristian Iversen (Esbjerg)	7	(1, 2, R, 3, 1)
12	Mads Hansen (Sønderjylland) (res)	5	( 1, 1, 1, 2)
13	Jonas Knudsen (Sønderjylland)	3	(2, 0, 0, 0, 1)
	Nicolai Klindt (Sønderjylland)	3	(0, 1, 1, 0, 1)
15	Kevin Juhl Pedersen (Holsted) (res)	2	(0, 1, 1, 0)
16	Tim Sørensen (Region Varde)	1	(1, 0, 0, 0, 0)
17	Michael Jepsen Jensen (Slangerup)	0	(F0, wd)
	Leon Madsen (Nordjysk)	0	(F0, wd)

=== U21 Championship ===
Benjamin Basso won the U21 Championship.

Pos.	Rider	Points
1	Benjamin Basso	14+3
2	Kevin Juhl Pedersen	14+2
3	Emil Breum	12
4	Jesper Knudsen	11
5	Esben Hjerrild	10
6	Marius Nielsen	9
7	Bastian Borke	8
8	Nicolai Heiselberg	8
9	Jonas Knudsen	8
10	Patrick Baek	7
11	Rune Thorst	7
12	Thomas Kring	5
13	Niklas H. Jakobsen	3
14	Rasmus Pedersen	2
15	Stian V. Nielsen	2
16	Patrick Skaarup	1

== Team ==
=== Danish Speedway League ===
Sønderjylland Elite Speedway (SES) won the Super League and were declared the winners of the Danish Speedway League.

Earlier in August 2022, Nordjysk Elite Speedway were forced to drop out of the league due to financial problems. The DMU stated that they would not be able to return to the league until 2024. The Nordjysk results were expunged from the league table.

Pos	Team	P	W	D	L	BP	Pts
1	SES	12	9	0	3	4	22
2	Holsted Tigers	12	8	0	4	4	20
3	Esbjerg Vikings	12	7	0	5	5	19
4	Slangerup	12	6	0	6	4	16
5	Grindsted	12	6	0	6	2	14
6	Region Varde	12	4	0	8	2	10
7	Team Fjelsted	12	2	0	10	0	4
8	Nordjysk+	0	0	0	0	0	0

+ results expunged

Semi-finals (teams ranked 3–6)

Team	Score	Score
Esbjerg Vikings	40	Iversen 14, MT Nielsen 9, Jeppesen 8, Vissing 6, Breum 3
Slangerup	34	Jepsen Jensen 13, Lyager 12, Seifert-Salk 5, K Hansen 2, Drejer 2
Region Varde	31	Lahti 12, Heiselberg 10, Nick Morris 7, Sørensen 2, Rew 0
Grindsted	26	K Bjerre 13, Gusts 4, Hjerrild 4, P Hansen 3, Juhl Pedersen 2

Final

Team	Score	Score
SES	42	Žagar 12, Klindt 10, M Hansen 8, Basso 6, J Knudsen 6
Slangerup	32	Jepsen Jensen 11, Seifert-Salk 8, Lyager 7, Porsing 4, Drejer 1
Holsted Tigers	30	R Jensen 9, Thorssell 9, L Bjerre 7, Marius Nielsen 5, Jørgensen 0
Esbjerg Vikings	29	Iversen 9, Zengota 9, Matias Nielsen 8, Breum 3, S Jensen 0

=== Teams ===
Sønderjylland Elite Speedway

- (Denmark) Mads Hansen
- (Denmark) Benjamin Basso
- (Denmark) Jesper Knudsen
- (Denmark) Anders Thomsen
- (Denmark) Nicolai Klindt
- (Denmark) Jonas Knudsen
- (Slovenia) Matej Žagar

Holsted

- (Denmark) Nicki Pedersen
- (Denmark) René Bach
- (Denmark) Lasse Bjerre
- (Denmark) Rasmus Jensen
- (Sweden) Jacob Thorssell
- (Denmark) Thomas Jørgensen
- (Denmark) Marius Nielsen
- (Poland) Norbert Kościuch
- (Denmark) Nicklas Aagaard

Esbjerg

- (Denmark) Niels Kristian Iversen
- (England) Tai Woffinden
- (Poland) Grzegorz Zengota
- (Denmark) Matias Nielsen
- (Denmark) Jonas Jeppesen
- (Denmark) Claus Vissing
- (Denmark) Chris Waennerstrom
- (Denmark) Emil Breum
- (Denmark) Sam Jensen

Slangerup

- (Denmark) Mikkel Michelsen
- (Denmark) Andreas Lyager
- (Denmark) William Drejer
- (Denmark) Jonas Seifert-Salk
- (Denmark) Kenneth Hansen
- (Denmark) Michael Jepsen Jensen
- (Poland) Patryk Rolnicki
- (Denmark) Nicklas Porsing
- (Finland) Timi Salonen
- (Finland) Jesse Mustonen

Grindsted

- (Denmark) Kenneth Bjerre
- (Latvia) Francis Gusts
- (Denmark) Patrick Hansen
- (Denmark) Kevin Juhl Pedersen
- (Denmark) Esben Hjerrild
- (Poland) Daniel Jeleniewski
- (Denmark) Andreas Kaag

Region Varde

- (Australia) Nick Morris
- (Poland) Oskar Fajfer
- (Australia) Keynan Rew
- (Denmark) Tim Sørensen
- (Finland) Timo Lahti
- (Denmark) Nicolai Heiselberg
- (Finland) Antti Vuolas
- (Sweden) Peter Ljung
- (Denmark) Bastian Borke

Fjelsted

- (Denmark) Frederik Jakobsen
- (Denmark) Peter Kildemand
- (Denmark) Hans Andersen
- (Denmark) Kasper Andersen
- (Poland) Patryk Wojdylo
- (Denmark) Stian V Nielsen
