= 2020 Team Speedway Junior European Championship =

2020 motorcycle competition

The 2020 Team Speedway Junior European Championship was the 13th Team Speedway Junior European Championship season. It was organised by the Fédération Internationale de Motocyclisme and was the 9th as an under 21 years of age event.

The final took place on 29 August 2020 in Łódź, Poland. The defending champions Poland ran out comfortable winners, finishing 6 points clear of Denmark, who won the race off for the silver when Mads Hansen beat Oļegs Mihailovs.

It was the first time that the final consisted of seven teams instead of four and included a European team.

== Results ==
=== Final ===
- (Poland) Łódź
- 29 August 2020

Pos.	National team	Pts.	Scorers
1	Poland	27	Jakub Miśkowiak 10, Dominik Kubera 9, Norbert Krakowiak 8, Mateusz Cierniak dnr
2	Denmark	21	Mads Hansen 11, Jonas Seifert-Salk 6, Marcus Birkemose 4, Matias Nielsen dnr
3	Latvia	21	Oļegs Mihailovs 9, Ričards Ansviesulis 6, Francis Gusts 6, Ernest Matjuszonoks 0
4	Sweden	20	Alexander Woentin 9, Philip Hellström Bängs 6, Anton Karlsson 5, Jonatan Grahn dnr
5	Czech Republic	17	Jan Kvěch 8, Petr Chlupáč 6, Daniel Klíma 3, Jan Macek dnr
6	Slovakia	11	Jakub Valkovic 6, David Pacalaj 5, Jan Mihailik 0, Ratislav Cifersky 0
7	Young Europe	8	Drew Kemp 6, Dennis Fazekas 1, Mika Meijer 1

Race off for 2nd and 3rd place - Hansen beat Mihailovs.

== See also ==
- 2020 Team Speedway Junior World Championship
- 2020 Individual Speedway Junior European Championship
