= 2020 Team Speedway Junior World Championship =

World motorcycle speedway event

The 2020 Team Speedway Junior World Championship was the 16th FIM Team Under-21 World Championship season. The final took place on 5 September 2020, at the Varde Motor Arena in Outrup, Denmark. The event had originally been planned for 22 August but was delayed due to concerns over the COVID-19 pandemic.

Poland won their 13th Team Under-21 World Championship, and their seventh in succession.

== Final ==
- (Denmark) Outrup
- 5 September 2020

Pos.	National team	Pts.
1	Poland	46
2	Denmark	42
3	Great Britain	32
4	Latvia	6

== Scores ==
(Poland)	POLAND	46
No	Rider Name	Pts.	Heats
1	Dominik Kubera	14	6, 1, 3, 1, 3
2	Wiktor Lampart	13	2, 3, 2, 3, 3
3	Jakub Miśkowiak	10	1, 1, 2, 3, 3
4	Viktor Trofimov Jr.	9	0, 2, 2, 3, 2
5	Norbert Krakowiak	0	0, F

(Denmark)	DENMARK	42
No	Rider Name	Pts.	Heats
1	Tim Sørensen	13	3, 3, 3, 2,
2	Mads Hansen	10	3, 2, 3, 1, 1
3	Jonas Seifert-Salk	10	3, 3, 1, 2, 1
4	Matias Nielsen	5	0, 2, 1, 2
5	Marcus Birkemose	4	0, 3, 1

(United Kingdom)	GREAT BRITAIN	32
No	Rider Name	Pts.	Heats
1	Dan Bewley	17	2, 2, 3, 6^, 2, 2
2	Tom Brennan	7	1, 2, R, 1, 2, 1
3	Drew Kemp	5	1, 2, 1, 1
4	Jordan Palin	2	0 ,1 ,1
5	Leon Flint	1	1

(Latvia)	LATVIA	6
No	Rider Name	Pts.	Heats
1	Francis Gusts	3	X, 0, 0, 0, 3
2	Ričards Ansviesulis	2	2, 0, 0, F, 0
3	Ernest Matjuszonok	1	0, 0, 1, 0, R
4	Daniils Kolodinskis	0	X
5	Oļegs Mihailovs	0	0, 0, 0, 0

== See also ==
- 2020 Speedway of Nations
- 2020 Individual Speedway Junior World Championship
