= 2021 European Under 23 Team Speedway Championship =

2021 motorcycle competition

The 2021 Team Speedway Junior European Championship was the 14th Team Speedway Junior European Championship season. It was organised by the Fédération Internationale de Motocyclisme and was the first time that the event had an age limit of under 23 years of age.

Qualification events took place at Broksted in Germany and Pardubice in the Czech Republic.

The final took place on 29 August 2021 at the Stadium Lokomotīve in Daugavpils, Latvia. The defending champions Poland won easily to claim the title for the eleventh time.

== Results ==
=== Final ===
- Daugavpils, Latvia
- 29 August 2021

Pos.	National team	Pts.	Scorers
1	Poland	47	Jakub Miśkowiak 13, Bartosz Smektała 12, Wiktor Lampart 11, Dominik Kubera 11, Gleb Chugunov 0
2	Denmark	35	Frederik Jakobsen 11, Jonas Jeppesen 10, Mads Hansen 8, Patrick Hansen 6
3	Latvia	27	Francis Gusts 10, Oļegs Mihailovs 10, Ričards Ansviesulis 4, Daniils Kolodinskis 2, Ernest Matjuszonoks 1
4	Germany	11	Norick Blödorn 5, Lukas Baumann 3, Lukas Fienhage 2, Michael Härtel 1, Marius Hillebrand 0

== See also ==
- 2021 Team Speedway Junior World Championship
- 2021 Individual Speedway Junior European Championship
