= 2021 European Pairs Speedway Championship =

Motorcycle racing competition

The 2021 European Pairs Speedway Championship was the 18th edition of the European Pairs Speedway Championship. the final was held at the Mâcon speedway track in Mâcon, France on 24 July.

The title was won by France for the first time.

== Final ==
Position	team	Riders	Points
1	France	David Bellego (14), Dimitri Bergé (12)	26
2	Poland	Jakub Jamróg (12), Grzegorz Zengota (10)	22
3	Latvia	Andžejs Ļebedevs (14), Jevgeņijs Kostigovs (7)	21
4	(United Kingdom) Great Britain	Adam Ellis (10), Chris Harris (6), Tom Brennan (0)	16
5	Denmark	Mads Hansen (14), Kevin Juhl Pedersen (2), Jonas Seifert-Salk (0)	16
6	Italy	Michele Paco Castagna (8), Nicolás Covatti (5), Nicolas Vicentin (0)	13
7	Czech Republic	Petr Chlupáč (7), Václav Milík Jr. (3), Jan Kvěch (1)	11

== See also ==
- 2021 Speedway European Championship
