= 2025 European Under 24 Team Speedway Championship =

European speedway competition

The 2025 European Under 24 Team Speedway Championship is the 18th Team Speedway Junior European Championship season. It was organised by the Fédération Internationale de Motocyclisme and was the first time that the event had an age limit of under 24 years of age.

The qualifying round was held at the Motodrom Ludwigslust in Ludwigslust on 12 July. Denmark won the qualifier with 51 points, and Great Britain (33) has qualified as 2nd. Both Czech Republic (29) and Germany (7) were eliminated.

The final took place in France for the third time since 2019, on 26 July 2025 at the Circuit de la Grisière and was won by Poland again.

== Results ==
=== Qualifying Round ===
- Motodrom Ludwigslust in Ludwigslust, Germany
- 12 July

Pos.	National team	Pts.	Scorers
1	Denmark	51	Bastian Pedersen 14, Villads Nagel 11, Mikkel Andersen 9, Benjamin Basso 9, Jonas Knudsen 8
2	Great Britain	33	Drew Kemp 9, Leon Flint 8, Dan Thompson 8, Sam Hagon 6, Jake Mulford 2
3	Czech Republic	29	Adam Bubba Bednář 12, Jan Kvěch 9, Daniel Klíma 4, Jan Macek 4, Jan Jeníček 0
4	Germany	7	Ben Iken 3, Jonny Wynant 2, Patrick Hyjek 1, Marlon Hegener 1, Mario Häusl 0

=== Final ===
- Circuit de la Grisière in Mâcon, France
- 26 July

Pos.	National team	Pts.	Scorers
1	Poland	48	Wiktor Przyjemski 14, Jakub Miskowiak 13, Damian Ratajczak 12, Bartłomiej Kowalski 9, Jakub Krawczyk DNR
2	Denmark	45	Mikkel Andersen 13, Villads Nagel 12, Bastian Pedersen 10, Jonas Knudsen 8, Benjamin Basso 2
3	Great Britain	23	Leon Flint 7, Dan Thompson 7, Sam Hagon 5, Luke Harrison 2, Jake Mulford 2
4	France	4	Mathias Trésarrieu 4, Tino Bouin 0, Theo Ugoni 0, Antoine Desserprix 0, Noah Urda 0

== See also ==
- 2025 World Junior Team Championship
- 2025 European Under-19 Individual Speedway Championship
