= 2021 European Under-19 Individual Speedway Championship =

Motorcycle racing competition

The 2021 European Individual Speedway Junior Championship was the 24th edition of the Championship. A major change took place before the 2021 Championships in that the age limit was reduced from under 21 years of age to under 19 years of age.

Three qualifying heats took place at the Nagyhalász Speedway Ring in Nagyhalász (22 May), Holsted (19 June) and Pardubice (26 June).

The final was staged on 7 August, at Riga in Latvia and was won by Francis Gusts of Latvia.

== Final ==
- 7 August 2021
- (Latvia) Riga

Pos.	Rider	Points	Details
1	(Latvia) Francis Gusts	14	(2, 3, 3, 3, 3)
2	(Sweden) Philip Hellström Bängs	11	(1, 2, 3, 2, 3)
3	(Poland) Mateusz Cierniak	11	(2, 2, 3, 1, 3)
4	(United Kingdom) Drew Kemp	10	(3, 2, 2, 3, 0)
5	(United Kingdom) Leon Flint	8	(1, 2, 2, FX, 3)
	(Latvia) Ernest Matjuszonok	8	(3, 0, 3, 2, 0)
	(Denmark) Emil Breum	8	(2, 1, 0, 3, 2)
	(Poland) Bartlomiej Kowalski	8	(3, 3, 2, FX, NS)
9	(Denmark) Esben Hjerrild	6	(2, 0, 1, 2, 1)
	(Norway) Mathias Pollestad	6	(1, 1, 2, 1, 1)
	(Czech Republic) Petr Chlupáč	6	(0, 1, 1, 2, 2)
12	(United Kingdom) Jordan Palin	5	(0, 3, XT, 1, 1)
	(Norway) Espen Sola	5	(0, 3, 0, FX, 2)
	(Poland) Karol Zupinski	5	(3, 1, FX, X, 1)
	(Germany) Norick Blödorn	5	(1, X, 1, 3, R)
16	(United Kingdom) Dan Gilkes (res)	2	(R, 2)
17	(Denmark) Chris Waenerstrom	0	(0, 0, 0, 0, 0)
18	(Poland) Sebastian Szostak (res)	0	(X)

Run-Off For Silver: Hellstrom-Bangs beat Cierniak

== See also ==
- 2021 Speedway European Championship
