= 2022 Polish speedway season =

Motorcycle racing competition

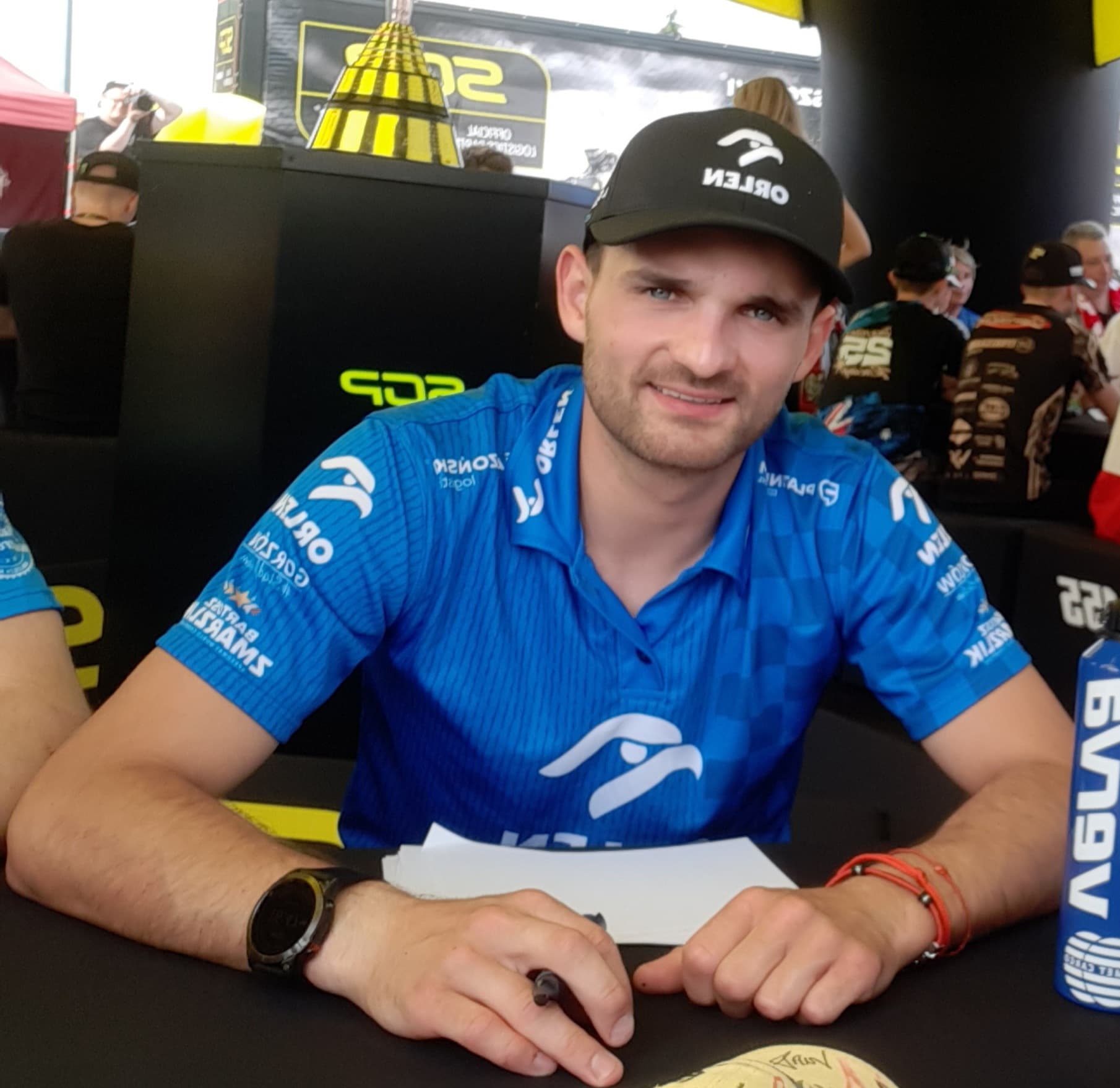
- Bartosz Zmarzlik, the world champion won the Polish title and Golden Helmet

The 2022 Polish Speedway season was the 2022 season of speedway in Poland.

== Individual ==
=== Polish Individual Speedway Championship ===
The 2022 Individual Speedway Polish Championship (Polish: Indywidualne Mistrzostwa Polski, IMP) was the 2022 version of Polish Individual Speedway Championship organised by the Polish Motor Union (PZM). The Championship was won by the world champion Bartosz Zmarzlik. He became the first rider to successfully defend the title since Tomasz Gollob in 2002.

The final was held over three legs at Grudziądz Speedway Stadium, Stadion MOSiR Krosno and Stadion Stali Rzeszów.

| Pos. | Rider | Club | Total |
|---|---|---|---|
| 1 | Bartosz Zmarzlik | Gorzów Wlkp | 49 |
| 2 | Dominik Kubera | Lublin | 41 |
| 3 | Janusz Kołodziej | Leszno | 32 |
| 4 | Jarosław Hampel | Lublin | 27 |
| 5 | Maciej Janowski | Wrocław | 25 |
| 6 | Bartosz Smektała | Częstochowa | 24 |
| | Kacper Woryna | Częstochowa | 24 |
| 8 | Grzegorz Zengota | Rybnik | 23 |
| 9 | Patryk Dudek | Toruń | 21 |
| 10 | Tobiasz Musielak | Krosno | 19 |
| 11 | Jakub Miśkowiak | Częstochowa | 18 |
| 12 | Przemysław Pawlicki | Grudziądz | 16 |
| 13 | Paweł Przedpełski | Toruń | 14 |
| 14 | Krzysztof Buczkowski | Zielona Góra | 11 |
| 15 | Mateusz Cierniak | Lublin | 9 |
| 16 | Krzysztof Kasprzak | Grudziądz | 8 |
| 17 | Rafał Karczmarz | Krosno | 5 |
| | Norbert Krakowiak | Grudziądz | 5 |
| 19 | Wiktor Lampart | Lublin | 4 |
| 20 | Jakub Jamróg | Gdańsk | 3 |
| | Mateusz Szczepaniak | Krosno | 3 |
| 22 | Kacper Szopa | Krosno | 0 |

=== Golden Helmet ===
The 2022 Golden Golden Helmet (Polish: Turniej o Złoty Kask, ZK) organised by the Polish Motor Union (PZM) was the 2022 event for the league's leading riders. The final was held at the Marian Spychała Speedway Stadium in Opole, on 18 April. Bartosz Zmarzlik won the Golden Helmet for the third successive year.

| Pos. | Rider | Club | Total | Points |
|---|---|---|---|---|
| 1 | Bartosz Zmarzlik | Gorzów Wlkp. | 15 | (3,3,3,3,3) |
| 2 | Dominik Kubera | Lublin | 13 | (2,3,2,3,3) |
| 3 | Patryk Dudek | Toruń | 12 | (3,3,1,3,2) |
| 4 | Maciej Janowski | Wrocław | 10 | (3,3,1,1,2) |
| 5 | Bartosz Smektała | Częstochowa | 10 | (2,2,3,2,1) |
| 6 | Szymon Woźniak | Gorzów Wlkp. | 9 | (2,1,2,2,2) |
| 7 | Piotr Pawlicki Jr. | Leszno | 8 | (2,t,3,3,t) |
| 8 | Gleb Chugunov | Wrocław | 8 | (1,2,2,2,1) |
| 9 | Janusz Kołodziej | Leszno | 7 | (t,1,3,0,3) |
| 10 | Jarosław Hampel | Lublin | 6 | (3,0,0,1,2) |
| 11 | Tobiasz Musielak | Krosno | 6 | (1,1,1,0,3) |
| 12 | Kacper Woryna | Częstochowa | 6 | (0,2,2,2,d) |
| 13 | Przemysław Pawlicki | Grudziądz | 4 | (1,2,1,0,d) |
| 14 | Wiktor Lampart | Lublin | 3 | (1,1,0,0,1) |
| 15 | Jakub Miśkowiak | Częstochowa | 2 | (0,0,0,1,1) |
| 16 | Paweł Przedpełski | Toruń | 1 | (0,0,0,1,0) |
| 17 | Krzysztof Kasprzak (res) | Grudziądz | 0 | (t,w,d) |
| 18 | Bartłomiej Kowalski (res) | Wrocław | 0 | (0,0) |

=== Criterium of Aces ===
The Mieczysław Połukard Criterium of Aces was won by Bartosz Zmarzlik.

=== Polish U21 Championship ===
- winner Mateusz Świdnicki

=== Silver Helmet ===
- winner - Jakub Miśkowiak

=== Bronze Helmet ===
- winner - Jakub Krawczyk

== Pairs ==
=== Polish Pairs Speedway Championship ===
The 2022 Polish Pairs Speedway Championship was the 2022 edition of the Polish Pairs Speedway Championship. The final was held on 3 April at the Golęcin Speedway Stadium in Poznań.

| Pos | Team | Pts | Riders |
|---|---|---|---|
| 1 | Motor Lublin | 23 | Dominik Kubera 15, Mikkel Michelsen 9, Wiktor Lampart 0 |
| 2 | Unia Leszno | 21+3 | Piotr Pawlicki 9+3, Janusz Kołodziej 7, Jason Doyle 5 |
| 3 | GKM Grudziądz | 21+2 | Przemysław Pawlicki 14+2, Krzysztof Kasprzak 5, Nicki Pedersen 2 |
| 4 | Stal Gorzów Wielkopolski | 20 | Bartosz Zmarzlik 16, Martin Vaculik 3, Szymon Woźniak 1 |
| 5 | Ostrów Wielkopolski | 18 | Chris Holder 11, Tomasz Gapiński 7 |
| 6 | WTS Sparta Wrocław | 12 | Maciej Janowski, Tai Woffinden 4, Gleb Czugunow 2 |
| 7 | PSŻ Poznań | 10 | Kacper Gomólski 9, Jonas Seifert-Salk 1, Rune Holta 0 |

== Team ==
=== Team Speedway Polish Championship ===
The 2022 Team Speedway Polish Championship was the 2022 edition of the Team Polish Championship. Lublin won the Ekstraliga and were awarded the gold medal and declared Polish Team Champions. Teams finishing second and third were awarded silver and bronze medals respectively.

Krosno won the 1. Liga and were promoted to the Ekstraliga and Poznań won the 2. Liga.

The German team Wölfe Wittstock were replaced by Polonia Piła in Liga 2.

=== Ekstraliga ===
Clubs

| Team | City | Founded | Stadium | Nickname |
|---|---|---|---|---|
| Włókniarz Częstochowa | Częstochowa | 1946 | Municipal Stadium, Częstochowa | The Lions |
| Stal Gorzów Wielkopolski | Gorzów Wielkopolski | 1950 | Stadion im. Edwarda Jancarza | The Steelers |
| GKM Grudziądz | Grudziądz | 1930 | Stadion Żużlowy w Grudziądzu | |
| Unia Leszno | Leszno | 1938 | Stadion im. Alfreda Smoczyka | The Bulls |
| KM Cross Lublin | Lublin | 2017 | Stadion MOSiR (Bystrzyca) | |
| TZ Ostrovia Ostrów Wielkopolski | Ostrów Wielkopolski | 1948 | Ostrów Wielkopolski Municipal Stadium | The Black Devils |
| Toruń | Toruń | 1962 | MotoArena Toruń | The Raptors |
| WTS Sparta Wrocław | Wrocław | 1950 | Stadion Olimpijski (Wrocław) | Spartans |

| Pos | Team | P | W | D | L | BP | Pts | Diff |
|---|---|---|---|---|---|---|---|---|
| 1 | Lublin | 14 | 12 | 1 | 1 | 6 | 31 | 168 |
| 2 | Częstochowa | 14 | 9 | 0 | 5 | 6 | 24 | 124 |
| 3 | Gorzów | 14 | 8 | 0 | 6 | 4 | 20 | 55 |
| 4 | Toruń | 14 | 7 | 1 | 6 | 3 | 18 | 2 |
| 5 | Wrocław | 14 | 6 | 2 | 6 | 3 | 17 | 58 |
| 6 | Leszno | 14 | 7 | 0 | 7 | 1 | 15 | -12 |
| 7 | Grudziądz | 14 | 5 | 0 | 9 | 2 | 12 | -136 |
| 8 | Ostrów | 14 | 0 | 0 | 14 | 0 | 0 | -259 |

Quarter-finals

| Team 1 | Team 2 | Score |
|---|---|---|
| Leszno | Lublin | 41–49, 39–51 |
| Wrocław | Częstochowa | 44–46, 38–52 |
| Toruń | Gorzów | 46–44, 39–51 |

Semi-finals

| Team 1 | Team 2 | Score |
|---|---|---|
| Gorzów | Częstochowa | 45–45, 48–42 |
| Toruń | Lublin | 50–40, 36–54 |

Third place

| Team 1 | Team 2 | Score |
|---|---|---|
| Toruń | Częstochowa | 46–44, 31–59 |

Final

| Team 1 | Team 2 | Score |
|---|---|---|
| Gorzów | Lublin | 51–39, 37–53 |

=== 1. Liga ===
Clubs

| Team | City | Founded | Stadium | Nickname |
|---|---|---|---|---|
| Polonia Bydgoszcz | Bydgoszcz | 1920 | Stadion Miejski im. Józefa Piłsudskiego | The Griffin |
| Wybrzeże Gdańsk | Gdańsk | 1945 | Stadium Zbigniew Podlecki | Coast |
| Start Gniezno | Gniezno | 1952 | Gniezno Speedway Stadium | Start |
| Wilki Krosno | Krosno | 2018 | Stadion MOSiR Krosno | The Wolves |
| AC Landshut | Landshut | 1922 | Ellermühle Speedway Stadium | The Devils |
| Orzeł Łódź | Łódź | 2006 | Moto Arena Łódź | The Eagles |
| ŻKS ROW Rybnik | Rybnik | 1930 | Rybnik Municipal Stadium | The Sharks |
| Falubaz Zielona Góra | Zielona Góra | 1946 | Zielona Góra Speedway Stadium | Mickey Mouse |

| Pos | Team | P | W | D | L | BP | Pts | Diff |
|---|---|---|---|---|---|---|---|---|
| 1 | Bydgoszcz | 14 | 11 | 1 | 2 | 7 | 30 | 77 |
| 2 | Zielona Góra | 14 | 9 | 2 | 3 | 4 | 24 | 153 |
| 3 | Krosno | 14 | 8 | 0 | 6 | 4 | 20 | 44 |
| 4 | Landshut (Germany) | 14 | 7 | 0 | 7 | 3 | 17 | -11 |
| 5 | Łódź | 14 | 5 | 1 | 8 | 3 | 14 | -29 |
| 6 | Gdańsk | 14 | 5 | 0 | 9 | 3 | 13 | -50 |
| 7 | Rybnik | 14 | 4 | 1 | 9 | 2 | 11 | -62 |
| 8 | Gniezno | 14 | 4 | 1 | 9 | 2 | 11 | -122 |

Quarter-finals

| Team 1 | Team 2 | Score |
|---|---|---|
| Łódź | Zielona Góra | 50–40, 38–52 |
| Gdańsk | Bydgoszcz | 46–43, 34–56 |
| Landshut | Krosno | 40–50, 32–58 |

Semi-finals

| Team 1 | Team 2 | Score |
|---|---|---|
| Zielona Góra | Bydgoszcz | 55–35, 43–47 |
| Łódź | Krosno | 49–41, 40–50 |

Final

| Team 1 | Team 2 | Score |
|---|---|---|
| Krosno | Zielona Góra | 50–40, 41–49 |

=== 2. Liga ===
Clubs

| Team | City | Founded | Stadium | Nickname |
|---|---|---|---|---|
| Lokomotiv Daugavpils | Daugavpils | 1964 | Stadium Lokomotīve | |
| Kolejarz Opole | Opole | 1957 | Municipal Speedway Stadium, Opole | Railwayman |
| Polonia Piła | Piła | 1992 | Stadion Żużlowy w Pile | |
| PSŻ Poznań | Poznań | 2004 | Stadion Golęcin | The Scorpions |
| Kolejarz Rawicz | Rawicz | 1949 | Florian Kapała Stadium | The Bears |
| Stal Rzeszów | Rzeszów | 1951 | Stadion Stali Rzeszów | The Cranes |
| Unia Tarnów | Tarnów | 1957 | Jaskółcze Gniazdo Municipal Stadium | The Swallows |

| Pos | Team | P | W | D | L | BP | Pts | Diff |
|---|---|---|---|---|---|---|---|---|
| 1 | Opole | 12 | 10 | 0 | 4 | 5 | 21 | 130 |
| 2 | Poznań | 12 | 10 | 0 | 4 | 5 | 21 | 109 |
| 3 | Rawicz | 12 | 10 | 0 | 4 | 5 | 21 | 68 |
| 4 | Daugavpils (Latvia) | 12 | 7 | 1 | 5 | 3 | 18 | 44 |
| 5 | Rzeszów | 12 | 5 | 0 | 7 | 1 | 11 | 11 |
| 6 | Tarnów | 12 | 4 | 0 | 8 | 2 | 10 | -134 |
| 7 | Piła | 12 | 1 | 1 | 10 | 0 | 3 | -229 |

Semi-finals

| Team 1 | Team 2 | Score |
|---|---|---|
| Daugavpils | Opole | 41–49, 41–49, |
| Rawicz | Poznań | 41–49, 44–46 |

Final

| Team 1 | Team 2 | Score |
|---|---|---|
| Poznań | Opole | 53–37, 44–46 |
