= Estonian Individual Speedway Championship =

Motorcycle speedway championship

- Sport: Motorcycle speedway
- Founded: 1971

The Estonian Individual Speedway Championship is a Motorcycle speedway championship held each year to determine the Estonian national champion. It was first staged in 1971. Championships was held last time in 2021.

== Key ==
- Unless stated, all riders are from Estonia

== Past winners ==
Year	Venue	Winner	2nd	3rd
1971	Järvakandi	Reino Viidas	Jaan Mürk	Jaan Rohula
1972	Järvakandi	Reino Viidas	Jaan Mürk	Elmet Varblane
1973	Järvakandi	Aleksandr Jefriemkin	Jaan Mürk	Reino Viidas
1974	Järvakandi	Jaan Mürk	Heldur Karask	Aleksandr Jefriemkin
1975	Vasalemma	Jaan Mürk	Reino Viidas	Aleksandr Jefriemkin
In years 1976–1983 event not held
1984	Tabasalu	Vjatšeslav Potapenko	Reino Viidas	Jüri Paenurm
1985	Tabasalu	Meelis Helm	Reino Viidas	Vjatšeslav Potapenko
1986	Tabasalu	Rene Aas	Arnold Ilves	Vjatšeslav Potapenko
1987	Tabasalu	Vjatšeslav Potapenko	Jaak Soolep	Janek Vunn
1988	Tabasalu	Vjatšeslav Potapenko	Vahur Helm	Ken Viidas
1989	Tabasalu	Vjatšeslav Potapenko	Aivar Korjus	Margus Adamson
1990	Tabasalu	Rene Aas	Vjatšeslav Potapenko	Jaak Soolep
1991	2 rounds	Ken Viidas	Tonu Talinurm	Tiit Soolep
1992	2 rounds	Vjatšeslav Potapenko	Rene Aas	Tiit Soolep
1993	2 rounds	Tõnu Talinurm	Margus Lipstal	Reiner Kimmel
1994		Ken Viidas	Tiit Soolep	Reiner Kimmel
1995		Ken Viidas	Tiit Soolep	Martin Mandre
1996	2 rounds	Ken Viidas	Martin Mandre	Aivo Savolainen
1997	4 rounds	Ken Viidas	Marko Männi	Tiit Soolep
1998		Ken Viidas		
In years 1999–2011 event not held
2012	4 rounds	Ken Viidas	Margus Mandre	Martin Kimmel
2013	2 rounds	(Finland) Nike Lunna	Ken Viidas	Silver Soolep
2014	2 rounds	(Latvia) Deniss Zvorigins	Silver Soolep	Maksims Vlasovs
2015	Event not held			
2016	3 rounds	(Finland) Janne Nyman	(Latvia) Elvis Avgucevičs	(Latvia) Davis Kurmis
2017	Kohtla-Nõmme	(Latvia) Elvis Avgucevičs	(Latvia) Ernest Matjuszonok	(Finland) Janne Nyman
2018	Tabasalu	(Latvia) Ričards Ansviesulis	(Latvia) Rūdolfs Sproģis	(Estonia) Markus Maximus Lill
2019	Tabasalu	(Russia) Nikita Zubariew	(Latvia) Artjoms Trofimovs	(Latvia) Ernest Matjuszonok
2020	Event not held			
2021	Tabasalu	(Latvia) Artjoms Juhno	(Finland) Niklas Säyriö	(Estonia) Markus Maximus Lill
