= 2020 Speedway Under-21 World Championship =

World motorcycle speedway event

World Under-21 Championship
- Venue: Svítkov Stadium
- Location: Pardubice, Czech Republic
- End date: 2 October

The 2020 Individual Speedway Under 21 World Championship was the 44th edition of the FIM Individual Under-21 World Championship. It was staged over one round only, at Pardubice in the Czech Republic, on 2 October. The competition was reduced from three rounds to just one because of the COVID-19 pandemic.

The title was won by Australian Jaimon Lidsey.

== Final ==
- 2 October Svítkov Stadium, Pardubice, Czech Republic

Pos	Rider	Pts	Total
1	(Australia) Jaimon Lidsey	(3,3,3,2,3,3,3)	20
2	(Poland) Dominik Kubera	(1,3,3,3,2,2,2)	16
3	(Latvia) Oļegs Mihailovs	(2,3,2,2,2,2,1)	14
4	(England) Dan Bewley	(2,2,3,3,3,3,0)	16
5	(Denmark) Mads Hansen	(2,1,3,1,1,1)	9
6	(Czech Republic) Petr Chlupáč	(3,W,0,2,2,1)	8
7	(Poland) Jakub Miśkowiak	(1,1,2,2,3,0)	9
8	(Czech Republic) Jan Kvěch	(3,2,2,3,3,U)	13
9	(Finland) Niklas Sayrio	(2,0,2,1,1)	6
10	(Germany) Lukas Fienhage	(0,3,1,1,0)	5
11	(Ukraine) Marko Levyshyn	(U,W,1,3,1)	5
12	(Italy) Mattia Lenarduzzi	(1,2,D,0,2)	5
13	(United States) Luke Becker	(T,2,1,1,D)	4
14	(Sweden) Alexander Woentin	(3,D,W,D,T)	3
15	(Germany) Lukas Baumann	(0,1,0,0,W)	1
16	(France) Steven Goret	(0,W,W,W)	0
17	(Czech Republic) Daniel Klíma	(D,U)	0
18	(Czech Republic) Pavel Kuchar	(U)	0

== See also ==
- 2020 Speedway Grand Prix
- 2020 Team Speedway Junior World Championship
