= PSŻ Poznań =

Polish motorcycle speedway team

Club information
- Track address: Stadion Golęcin, ul. Warmińska 1 Poznań
- Country: Poland
- Founded: 2004
- Team manager: Tomasz Bajerski
- League: Ekstraliga 2
- Website: official website

Club facts
- Colours: Black and Yellow
- Nickname: Scorpions
- Track size: 345 m
- Track record time: 64.86 seconds
- Track record date: 11 July 2021
- Track record holder: Kevin Wölbert

Major team honours
2. Liga	2022

Poznańskie Stowarzyszenie Żużlowe (Poznań Speedway Association) is a Polish speedway team based in Poznań who currently race in Polish Speedway Second League (2. Liga). The club have never ridden in the Polish top division. Their nickname is "The Scorpions" (pol. Skorpiony).

== Stadium ==
The "Stadion Golęcin" is located on ulica Warmińska 1. It contains 6,250 seats. The track is 345 metres long and has a granite surface. The currently track record belongs to Marcus Birkemose with 66.27 seconds achieved on 5 September 2020.

== History ==
=== Predecessors ===
==== Lechia Poznań ====
Speedway in Poznan was active during the inaugural 1948 Polish speedway season. Lechia Poznań was one of two clubs to compete in the very first edition of the Championships. The team only competed until the end of 1950.

==== Unia Poznań ====
A second club called Unia Poznań also started in 1948 and continued until the end of 1950, although they did compete in the regional leagues in 1951 as did another team called Kolejarz Poznań.

==== Gwardia/Olimpia Poznań ====
Gwardia Poznań competed in the regional leagues in 1951 and 1955 before taking part in the second division north group in 1956. Under their new name Olimpia Poznań, they were due to compete in the third division in 1957 but received a one year ban from the authorities.

The 1957 season proved to be the last for teams from Poznań for 34 years, although meetings were still held in the city at the Stadion Golęcin.

==== Polonez Poznań ====
In 1991, Polonez Poznań were formed and raced in the second division. The return of speedway was boosted by the stadium securing the 1991 Speedway World Pairs Championship. However, the season turned out to be a disaster because Polonez were declared bankrupt after just one season.

=== Current club ===
==== Foundation and stadium issues ====
In 2004, in an attempt to revive the city's rich speedway traditions, a new club called "PSŻ Poznań" was created by local speedway fans, after over a decade of absence of the sport in the area. The club noted its first start in 2006, in which they came 2nd in the 2. Liga and won promotion after beating KSM Krosno in a promotion play-off. The club won its first individual medal in 2007 when Daniel Pytel was third in Individual U-21 Polish Championship. A year later, Adam Skórnicki became the Polish Champion.

In 2011 season, the team were relegated to 2. Liga and after issues with the stadium's owners Olimpia concerning rent fees, the club was left homelessand did not enter a team for the 2012 season. Although the club did not cease to exist they campaigned for the Olimpia stadium, which in the meantime fell into complete disrepair and ruin, owned by the Polish police, to be taken over by the city council. Upon lengthy but ultimately successful takeover by the city, the club began to repair the stadium under a new project called Sportowy Golaj, a joint venture with mountain biking enthusiasts and the Poznań Patriots american football team. The complete rebuilding of the stadium was completed in 2015.

==== Re-launch and return ====
The team returned to action in 2017 and during the 2022 Polish Speedway season the team won the 2. Liga title.

== Previous teams ==
Extended content

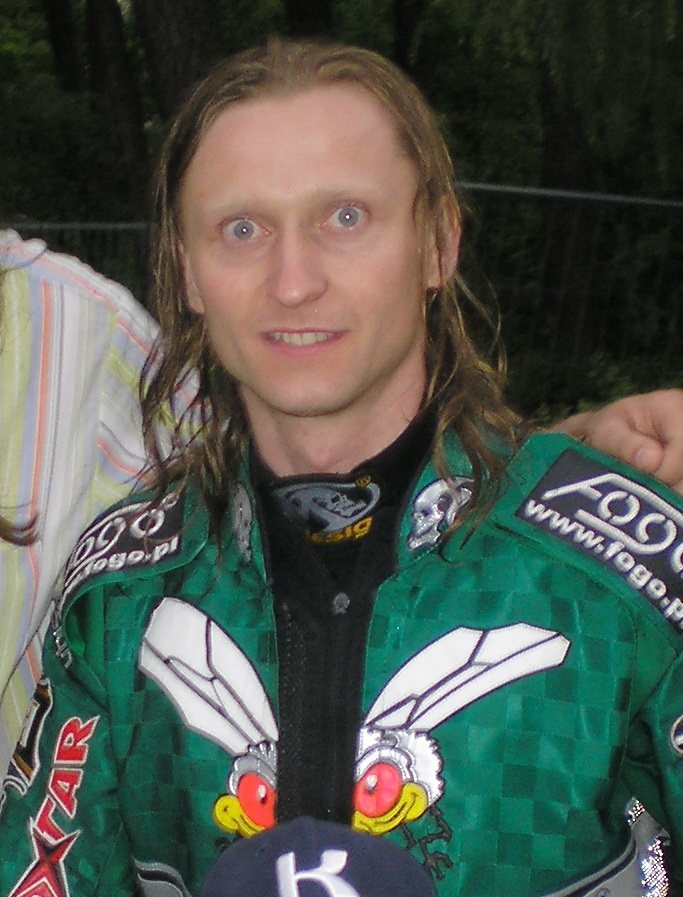
Adam Skórnicki - 2008 Individual Polish Champion.

2008 season:

Rider	Age	Average
(Poland) Adam Skórnicki	32	2.135
(Poland) Norbert Kościuch	24	1.965
(Finland) Kauko Nieminen	29	1.909
(Poland) Rafał Trojanowski	32	1.652
(Poland) Grzegorz Kłopot	30	1.600
(Poland) Daniel Pytel	21	1.140
(Poland) Zbigniew Suchecki	24	1.105
(Denmark) Anders Andersen	20	0.625
(Poland) Piotr Dziatkowsiak	21	0.600
(Poland) Alan Marcinkowski	22	1.316 (E)

2020 season:

Rider	Age	Average
(Denmark) Marcus Birkemose	17	2.225
(Poland) Robert Chmiel	22	1.115
(Sweden) Filip Hjelmland	22	1.583
(Poland) Lars Skupień	29	1.206
(Poland) Marcel Kajzer	30	0.000
(Poland) Zbigniew Suchecki	36	1.080
(Poland) Bartosz Szymura	21	0.250 (E)
(Germany) Kevin Wölbert	31	2.213
(Denmark) Matias Nielsen	22	1.333 (E)
(Poland) Wiktor Jasiński (j)	20	2.077 (E)
(Poland) Mateusz Panicz (j)	16	0.480
(Poland) Jakub Poczta (j)	16	0.529 (E)
(Poland) Kacper Grzelak (j)	17	0.500 (E)

2022 squad

- (Poland) Olivier Buszkiewicz
- (Norway) Rune Holta
- (Poland) Kacper Gomólski
- (Denmark) Jonas Seifert-Salk
- (Poland) Robert Chmiel
- (Poland) Kacper Grzelak
- (Poland) Kevin Fajfer
- (Latvia) Francis Gusts
- (Poland) Damian Ratajczak
- (Poland) Emil Breum

2023 team

- (Sweden) Antonio Lindback
- (Denmark) Jonas Seifert-Salk
- (Ukraine) Aleksandr Loktajew
- (Poland) Adrian Cyfer
- (Poland) Kevin Fajfer
- (Poland) Adrian Gala
- (Denmark) Emil Breum
- (Poland) Jakub Martyniak
- (Poland) Kacper Teska
- (Poland) Kacper Grzelak
- (Poland) Karol Zupinski

== Honours ==
Competitions	Total	Golden medals		Silver medals		Bronze medals
Competitions	Total	Total	Years	Total	Years	Total	Years
Team (DMP) (since 1948)	0
Team U-21 (MDMP) (since 1978)	0
Pairs (MPPK) (since 1974)	0
Pairs U-21 (MMPPK) (1980 U-23; since 1983)	0
Individual (IMP) (since 1948)	1	1	2008
Individual U-21 (MIMP) (since 1967)	2			1	2008	1	2007
Total Polish Championship medals: 3		Gold: 1		Silver: 1		Bronze: 1
Competitions	Total	I place		II place		III place
Competitions	Total	Total	Years	Total	Years	Total	Years
European Club (KPE) (since 1998)	0
Team Cup (DPP) (?)	0
Golden Helmet (ZK) (since 1961)	0
Silver Helmet U-21 (SK) (since 1966)	0
Bronze Helmet U-19 (BK) (1976-81; since 1983)	0

== Notable riders ==
- (Poland) Adam Skórnicki
