= Golęcin Speedway Stadium =

Stadium in Poland

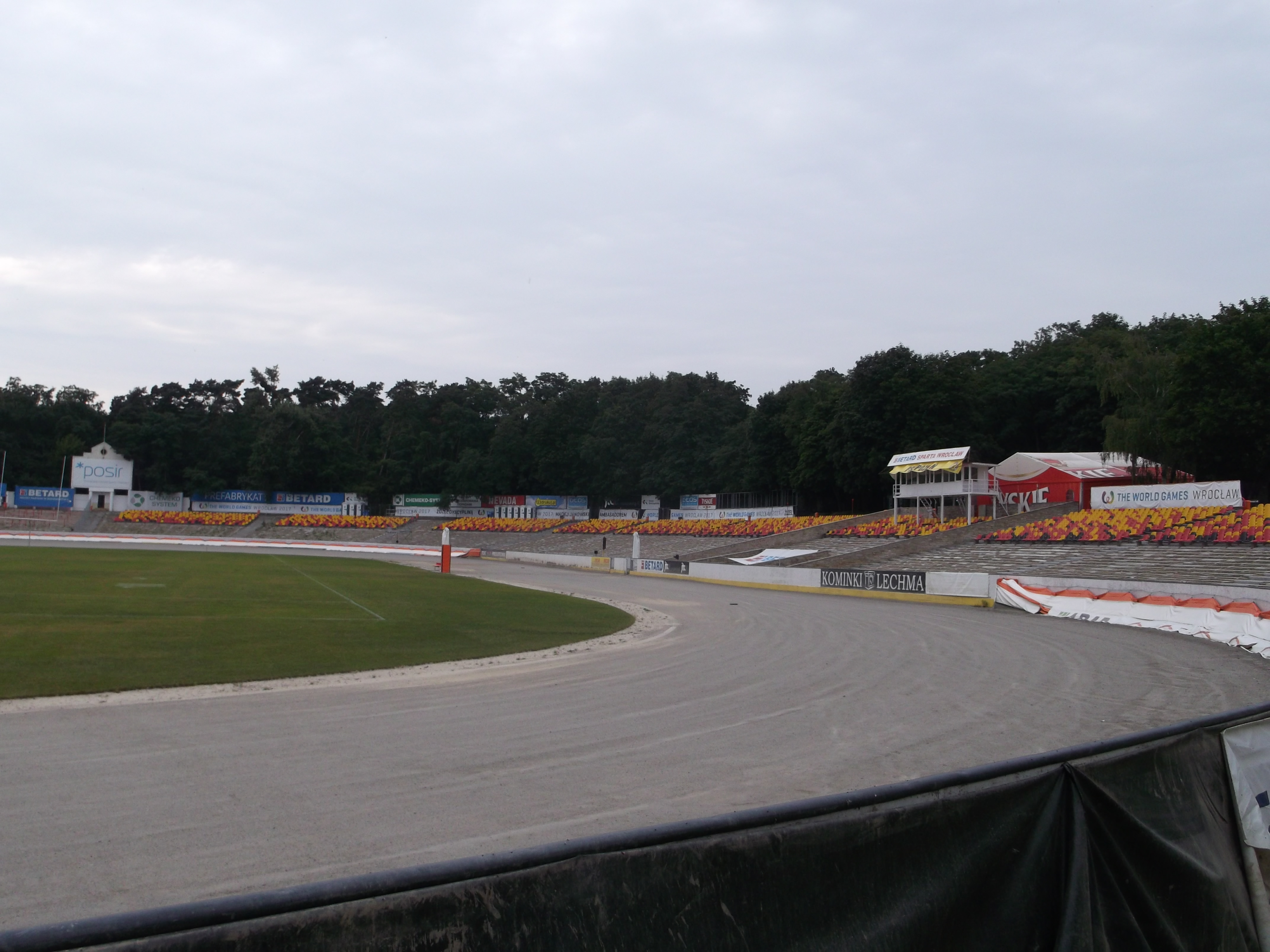
- Location: Warmińska 1, 60-622, Golęcin, Poznań, Poland
- Coordinates: 52°25′38″N 16°53′18″E
- Capacity: 8,275
- Owner: POSiR Poznań
- Opened: 1954
- Length: 0.345 km (0.214 mi)

Golęcin Speedway Stadium is a motorcycle speedway and multi-use stadium located in the Jeżyce district, north west of Poznań in Poland. It is not to be confused with the athletics stadium situated immediately south of the speedway and football stadium. It is currently used as the home venue for the speedway team called PSŻ Poznań, who compete in the Polish Speedway First League of the Team Speedway Polish Championship.

== History ==
The stadium was built in 1954 and had a capacity of 20,000 spectators. The sports club Olimpia Poznań used the venue and the association football team experienced significant success during the 1980s and early 1990s in the highest Polish divisions. However, in 2005, due to the lack of interest and money, the board of Olimpia decided to liquidate the football club.

Speedway was first held at the stadium in 1954 with the team Unia Poznań and then Gwardia Poznań, who both competed in the regional leagues, before taking part in the second division north group in 1956. Under their new name Olimpia Poznań, they were due to compete in the third division in 1957 but received a one-year ban from the authorities. The 1957 season proved to be the last for teams from Poznań for 34 years, although various other meetings were still held in the city at the stadium.

In 1991, Polonez Poznań were formed and raced in the second division. The return of speedway was boosted by the stadium securing the 1991 Speedway World Pairs Championship. Unfortunately Polonez were declared bankrupt after just one season.

In 2004, in an attempt to revive the city's rich speedway traditions, a new club called "PSŻ Poznań" was created by local speedway fans, after over a decade of absence of the sport in the area. The club noted its first start in 2006.

In 2014, the stadium grounds were taken over by the Poznański Ośrodek Sportu i Rekreacji and a joint project by the tenants of the stadium saw the renovation of the stadium. In 2016, in order to adapt the facility to the licensing requirements for Ekstraliga clubs, the Poznań City Council allocated PLN 1.8 million in the city's 2016 budget for the renovation of the stadium. The renovation was completed on 2 April 2016, with a capacity of 8,275 (6,275 seats).

During the 2022 Polish speedway season, the Polish Pairs Speedway Championship was held at the stadium.

== Speedway track records ==
- 67.50 Bartosz Smektała, 10 June 2015
- 65.80 Tai Woffinden, 1 May 2016
- 65.22 Max Fricke, 23 July 2017
- 66.27 Marcus Birkemose, 5 September 2020

== See also ==
- Speedway in Poland
- PSŻ Poznań
