= Circuit de la Grisière =

Motorcycle speedway stadium in Mâcon, France

- Interactive map of Circuit de la Grisière
- Location: Parc des Sports et des Loisirs, Rte de la Grisière, 71000 Mâcon, France
- Coordinates: 46°20′11″N 4°48′44″E

Circuit de la Grisière is a motorcycle speedway and flat track venue in Mâcon, France. It is located on the north-west outskirts of the city in the Parc des Sports et des Loisirs and is run by the Association Moto Club de Mâcon (AMCM).

== List of major events ==
The venue has increasingly hosted important speedway meetings in recent years.

- 2017 Individual Speedway Junior European Championship semi final
- 2021 European Pairs Speedway Championship final
- 2022 European Pairs Speedway Championship semi final
- 2023 European Under 23 Team Speedway Championship final
- 2024 Speedway Under 21 World Championship Qualifier
- 2025 European Under 24 Team Speedway Championship
