= 2023 Speedway of Nations 2 =

Motorcycle racing competition

- Venue: Riga Speedway Stadium
- Location: Latvia
- Start date: 11 August 2023
- End date: 11 August 2023

The 2023 Speedway of Nations 2 (SON2) was the 19th Team Under-21 World Championship season, organised by the FIM and sponsored by DeWalt. The event took place on 11 August 2023 at the Riga Speedway Stadium in Riga, Latvia.

Defending champions Poland won their 16th Team Under-21 World Championship and tenth in succession.

== Final ==
- (Latvia) Riga
- 11 August 2023

| Pos | Nation | Riders | Pts |
|---|---|---|---|
| 1 | Poland | Mateusz Cierniak 22, Wiktor Przyjemski 14, Bartlomiej Kowalski 3 | 39 |
| 2 | Denmark | Esben Hjerrild 12, Jesper Knudsen 10, Emil Breum 9 | 31 |
| 3 | Latvia | Francis Gusts 20, Ričards Ansviesulis 7, Ernest Matjušzonok 0 | 27 |
| 4 | Australia | Keynan Rew 20, James Pearson 5, Tate Zischke 0 | 25 |
| 5 | Germany | Norick Blodorn 20, Erik Bachhuber 4 | 24 |
| 6 | Czech Republic | Daniel Klíma 12, Petr Chlupáč 11 | 23 |
| 7 | Great Britain | Anders Rowe 17, Dan Gilkes 3, Drew Kemp 0 | 20 |

=== Grand Final Qualifier ===
| 1st | 2nd |
|---|---|
| Denmark - 5 Hjerrild - 3 Breum - 2 | Latvia - 4 Ansviesulis - 4 Gusts - 0 |

=== Grand Final ===
| 1st | 2nd |
|---|---|
| Poland - 7 Przyjemski - 4 Cierniak - 3 | Denmark - 2 Hjerrild - 2 Knudsen - 0 |

== See also ==
- 2023 SGP2
