= Ernest Matjuszonok =

Latvian speedway rider

- Born: 14 May 2002 (age 24); Latvia
- Nationality: Latvian

Career history

Poland
- 2022–2024: Daugavpils
- 2024: Lublin
- 2025: Kraków

Team honours
- 2023: U21 World Team bronze
- 2018, 2010, 2021: U23 European Team bronze

Ernest Matjuszonok (born 14 May 2002) is an international motorcycle speedway rider from Latvia.

== Career ==
Matjuszonok came to prominence after reaching the final series of the 2018 Speedway Under-21 World Championship, aged just 16 and winning his first silverware after securing a bronze medal at the European Junior Team Championships.

In 2020, Matjuszonok won another bronze medal at the 2020 Team Speedway Junior European Championship and repeated his success of 2018 and 2020 by winning a third bronze medal during the 2021 European Under 23 Team Speedway Championship. Matjuszonok finished in sixth place in the 2021 Individual Speedway Junior European Championship and also in 2021, Matjuszonok, riding with riding partners Francis Gusts and Ričards Ansviesulis, won the European U19 pairs title.

Matjuszonok made his Speedway Grand Prix (World Championship) debut during the Speedway Grand Prix of Latvia as a track reserve in the 2023 Speedway Grand Prix. Also in 2023, Matjuszonok won the bronze medal at the U21 World Team Championships at the 2023 Speedway of Nations 2.
