= 2021 Speedway European Championship =

Motorcycle racing competition

Season details
- Dates: 16 June – 10 July
- Events: 4
- Cities: 4
- Countries: 2
- Riders: 15 permanents 1 wild card(s); 2 track reserves
- Heats: (in 4 events)

Winners
- Champion: DEN Mikkel Michelsen
- Runner-up: DEN Leon Madsen
- 3rd place: POL Patryk Dudek

The 2021 Speedway European Championship season was the ninth season of the Speedway European Championship (SEC) era, and the 21st UEM Individual Speedway European Championship.

The title was won by Mikkel Michelsen, who beat Leon Madsen by two points.

== Venues ==
Round	Date	Venue
1	16 June	(Poland) Józef Piłsudski Municipal Stadium, Bydgoszcz
2	26 June	(Germany) Güstrow Speedway Stadium, Güstrow
3	4 July	(Poland) Zbigniew Podlecki Stadium, Gdańsk
4	10 July	(Poland) Rybnik Municipal Stadium, Rybnik

== Final classification ==
Pos.	Rider	Points	(Poland)	(Germany)	(Poland)	(Poland)
1	(Denmark) (155) Mikkel Michelsen	53	14	10	15	14
2	(Denmark) (30) Leon Madsen	51	13	11	13	14
3	(Poland) (692) Patryk Dudek	46	11	12	10	13
4	(Poland) (777) Piotr Pawlicki Jr.	46	15	14	10	7
5	(United Kingdom) (99) Dan Bewley	37	11	9	11	6
6	(Poland) (115) Bartosz Smektała	37	4	11	10	12
7	(United Kingdom) (505) Robert Lambert	35	8	5	13	9
8	(Russia) (?) Sergey Logachev	30	4	7	9	10
9	(Germany) (744) Kai Huckenbeck	26	8	9	6	3
10	(Czech Republic) (225) Václav Milík Jr.	24	7	8	5	4
11	(Latvia) (29) Andžejs Ļebedevs	22	5	6	7	4
12	(Denmark) (?) Patrick Hansen	19	4	5	4	6
13	(Sweden) (24) Jacob Thorssell	18	5	9	4	–
14	(Finland) (98) Timo Lahti	14	3	6	1	4
15	(Denmark) (110) Nicki Pedersen	13	3	–	3	7
16	(Russia) (?) Vadim Tarasenko	11	11	–	–	–
17	(France) (415) David Bellego	9	–	–	–	9
18	(Poland) (?) Krystian Pieszczek	5	–	–	5	–
19	(Norway) (?) Rune Holta	4	–	–	–	4
20	(Germany) (17) Ben Ernst	3	–	3	–	–
21	(Germany) (?) Lukas Baumann	1	–	1	–	–
22	(Poland) (18) Piotr Gryszpiński	0	–	–	0	–
23	(Poland) (18) Viktor Trofimov	0	–	–	–	0
24	(Poland) (17) Alan Szczotka	0	–	–	0	–
25	(Poland) (18) Wiktor Przyjemski	0	0	–	–	–
26	(Poland) (17) Jakub Miśkowiak	0	–	–	–	0
27	(Poland) (17) Mateusz Tonder	0	0	–	–	–
28	(Germany) (18) Mario Niedermeier	0	–	0	–	–

== See also ==
- 2021 European Pairs Speedway Championship
- 2021 Speedway Grand Prix
