= MOSiR Stadium (Krosno) =

Stadium in Krosno, Poland

Stadion MOSiR Krosno
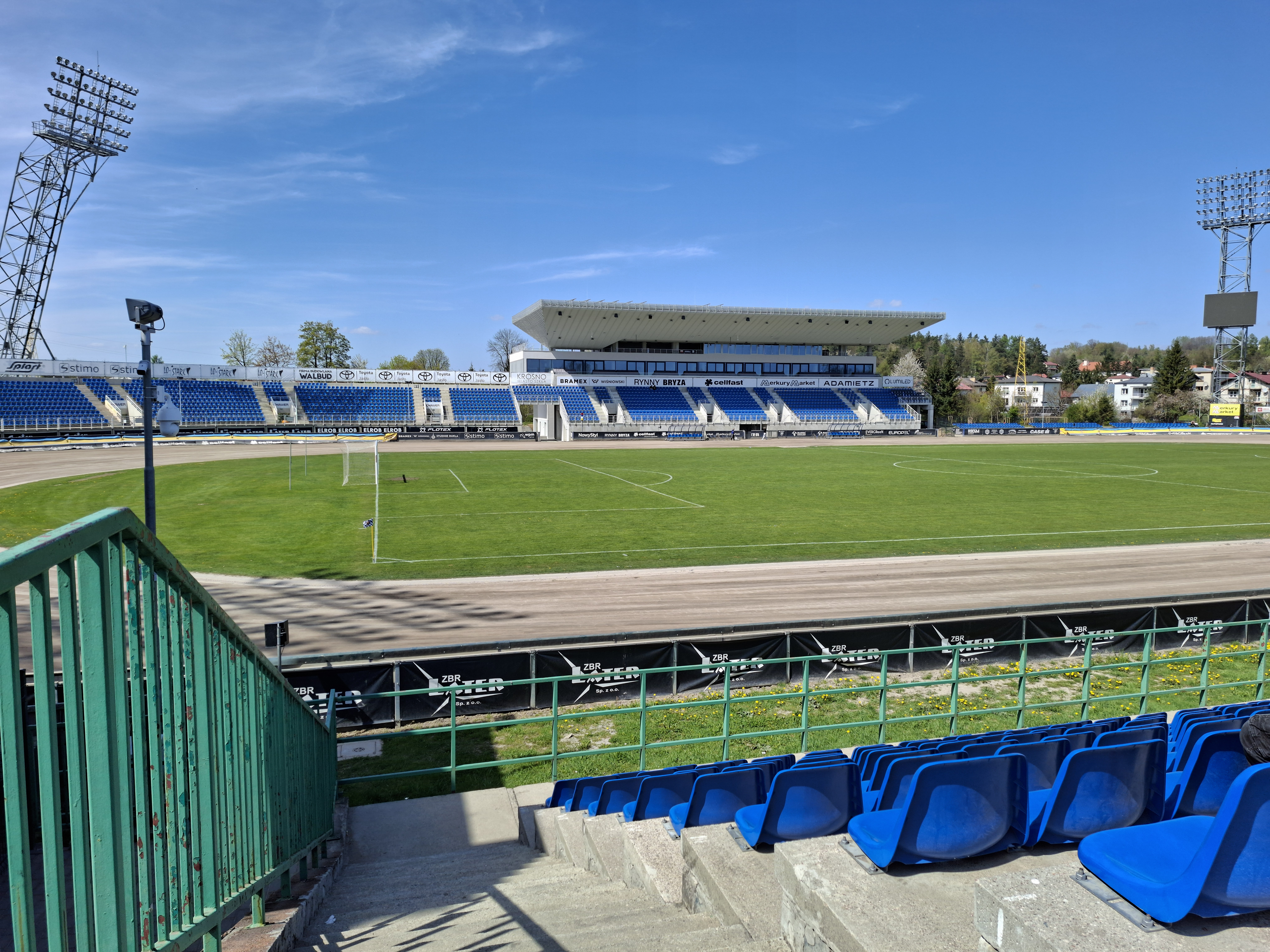
- The stadium in 2020
- Location: Bursaki 41, 38-400 Krosno, Poland
- Coordinates: 49°41′29″N 21°46′49″E
- Capacity: 7,000
- Owner: City of Krosno
- Operator: MOSiR Krosno
- Opened: 22 July 1951
- Length: 0.396 km (0.246 mi)

The Stadion MOSiR Krosno is a 7,000-capacity motorcycle speedway stadium in Krosno in Poland.

The venue is used by the speedway team Wilki Krosno, who compete in the Team Speedway Polish Championship.

== History ==
The stadium construction started in 1949, with the venue to be used by football, athletics and motorcycle speedway. The official opening was on 22 July 1951.

The stadium experienced long periods without speedway but in 1986 a large renovation took place with the return of a speedway team to the town. In 2002, the stadium was made into an all-seater stadium, although spectators are able to view from the grass curves.

In 2017, the speedway track was reduced slightly in size from 398 metres to 396 metres and remains the longest speedway track in Poland. Between the 2022 and 2023 seasons, to adapt the stadium to the requirements of the PGE Ekstraliga, a stand with infrastructure was built on the south side.
