= Norbert Krakowiak =

Polish speedway rider

- Born: 28 July 1999 (age 27); Gorzów Wielkopolski, Poland
- Nationality: Polish

Career history

Poland
- 2015, 2025: Ostrów
- 2016–2017: Toruń
- 2017–2018: Gniezno
- 2019–2020: Zielona Góra
- 2021–2023: Grudziądz
- 2024: Krosno

Sweden
- 2022–2023: Indianerna
- 2024: Piraterna

Denmark
- 2023: Fjelsted

Team honours
- 2020: World team junior champion
- 2020: European team junior champion

Norbert Krakowiak (born 28 July 1999) is a Polish motorcycle speedway rider.

== Speedway career ==
Krakowiak came to prominence as part of the Poland national under-21 speedway team that won the 2020 World team junior championship. and the 2020 Team Speedway Junior European Championship.

During 2022, Krakowiak rode for Grudziądz in the Ekstraliga and Indianerna in the Elitserien. He also won a bronze medal at the 2022 European Pairs Speedway Championship.

In 2024, Krakowiak signed to ride for Wilki Krosno.
