= Bastian Borke =

Danish speedway rider

- Born: 16 July 2002 (age 24); Denmark
- Nationality: Danish

Career history

Denmark
- 2022: Region Varde
- 2023: Slangerup
- 2024: Grindsted

Poland
- 2022: Rzeszów

Sweden
- 2022: Vargarna
- 2024–2025: Valsarna

Great Britain
- 2023: Edinburgh
- 2024–2025: Berwick

Bastian Borke (born 16 July 2002) is a motorcycle speedway rider from Denmark.

== Career ==
After riding for Region Varde in 2022, Borke joined Slangerup for the 2023 season in the Danish Speedway League. He also rode in the Team Speedway Polish Championship for Rzeszów and in the Swedish Speedway Team Championship for Vargarna.

In 2023, Borke was named in the Danish squad by team manager Nicki Pedersen. He was called into the Edinburgh Monarchs team during June 2023, to compete in the SGB Championship 2023.

In 2024, Borke signed for Berwick Bandits for the SGB Championship season.
