= Ričards Ansviesulis =

Latvian speedway rider (born 2002)

- Born: 21 June 2002 (age 24); Latvia
- Nationality: Latvian

Career history

Poland
- 2022–2023: Daugavpils

Sweden
- 2022: Indianerna
- 2023: Vargarna
- 2024: Solkatterna

Individual honours
- 2018: Estonian Championship

Team honours
- 2023: U21 World Team bronze
- 2010, 2021: U23 European Team bronze

Ričards Ansviesulis (born 21 June 2002) is an international motorcycle speedway rider from Latvia.

== Career ==
Ansviesulis won the 2018 Estonian Individual Speedway Championship aged just 16 and came to prominence after winning the bronze medal at the 2020 Team Speedway Junior European Championship.

Ansviesulis repeated his success of 2020 by winning a second bronze medal during the 2021 European Under 23 Team Speedway Championship. In 2021 Ansviesulis, riding with riding partners Ernests Matjusonoks and Francis Gusts, won the European U19 pairs title.

After signing for Vargarna for the 2023 Swedish speedway season, Ansviesulis made his Speedway Grand Prix (World Championship) debut during the Speedway Grand Prix of Latvia as a track reserve in the 2023 Speedway Grand Prix. Also in 2023, Ansviesulis won the bronze medal at the U21 World Team Championships at the 2023 Speedway of Nations 2.
