= Emil Breum =

Danish speedway rider

- Born: 16 January 2002 (age 24); Denmark
- Nationality: Danish

Career history

Denmark
- 2019: Holsted
- 2021–2024: Esbjerg

Poland
- 2022: Poznań
- 2022: Grudziądz
- 2024: Opole
- 2025: Daugavpils

Sweden
- 2023–2024: Njudungarna

Great Britain
- 2023: King's Lynn

Individual honours
- 2023: Danish U21 Champion

Team honours
- 2023: World U23 Team silver
- 2023: Danish League

Emil Breum Ankersen (born 16 January 2002) is a motorcycle speedway rider from Denmark.

== Career ==
Breum reached the final of the 2021 Individual Speedway Junior European Championship. In 2022, he won the bronze medal in the Danish U21 Championship.

Breum rides in the Danish Speedway League for Esbjerg Vikings (2022 to 2023) and in the Polish Polish Speedway First League for Poznań (2022).

In 2023, Breum was named in the Danish squad by team manager Nicki Pedersen. Later during 2023, he became the Danish Under 21 champion and in 2023, he also helped Esbjerg Vikings win the Danish League.

Midway through the 2023 season, Breum signed fo King's Lynn Stars to ride in the SGB Premiership 2023.
