= Jonas Seifert-Salk =

Danish speedway rider (born 2000)

- Born: 27 June 2000 (age 26); Slangerup, Denmark
- Nationality: Danish

Career history

Denmark
- 2017–2025: Slangerup

Poland
- 2021-2023: Poznań
- 2024: Krosno
- 2025: Piła

Sweden
- 2020-2023: Piraterna

Team honours
- 2018, 2020: Team Speedway Under-21 World Championship silver
- 2022: European Pairs Speedway Championship gold
- 2025: Danish league champion

Jonas Seifert-Salk (born 27 June 2000) is a motorcycle speedway rider from Denmark.

== Speedway career ==
Seifert-Salk has two silver medals at the Team Speedway Under-21 World Championship in 2018 and 2020. He won a bronze medal at the Danish Under 21 Individual Speedway Championship and three silver medals at the Team Speedway Junior European Championship in 2019, 2020 and 2022.

Seifert-Salk represented Denmark in the 2021 and 2022 European Pairs Speedway Championship and as an unused substitute won the gold medal at the 2022 European Pairs Speedway Championship.

In 2022, Seifert-Salk was riding for Slangerup in Denmark, Poznań in Poland and Piraterna in Sweden. He helped PSŻ Poznań win the 2022 2.Liga.

During the 2025 Danish speedway season, Seifert-Salk helped Slangerup retain the Speedway Ligaen title
