= Bartłomiej Kowalski =

Polish speedway rider

- Born: 4 March 2002 (age 24); Tarnów, Poland
- Nationality: Polish

Career history

Poland
- 2018: Kraków
- 2019–2021: Częstochowa
- 2020: Krosno
- 2021–2022: Opole
- 2022–2026: Wrocław
- 2027: Leszno

Sweden
- 2023–2025: Indianerna

Denmark
- 2025: Slangerup

Speedway Grand Prix statistics
- SGP number: 302
- Starts: 2 (reserve)
- Podiums: 0-0-0
- Finalist: 0 times
- Winner: 0 times

Individual honours
- 2023: Silver Helmet
- 2023: Polish U21 Champion
- 2023: World U21 bronze

Team honours
- 2023: World U21 Team champion
- 2022, 2023, 2024: Team Junior European champion
- 2025: Danish league champion

Bartłomiej Kowalski (born 4 March 2002) is an international motorcycle speedway rider from Poland.

== Career ==
Kowalski came to prominence in 2022, when he was part of the Polish team that won the Team Junior European Championship.

Previously, Kowalski had ridden for Wanda Kraków in 2018 and Włókniarz Częstochowa from 2020 until 2021. In 2022, he joined Wrocław.

In 2023, Kowalski joined Indianerna for the 2023 Swedish speedway season. In August 2023, he won his first Team Speedway Under-21 World Championship, winning the 2023 Speedway of Nations 2, in addition to winning a second U23 European team title. His 2023 season was capped off in fine style following success in winning the Silver Helmet and Polish Junior Championship, during the 2023 Polish speedway season.

Kowalski won a third successive gold medal at the 2024 European Under 23 Team Speedway Championship.

During the 2025 Danish speedway season, Kowalski helped Slangerup retain the Speedway Ligaen title.

== Major results ==
=== World individual Championship ===
- 2021 Speedway Grand Prix - =32nd
- 2023 speedway grand prix - =21st
