= Oļegs Mihailovs =

Latvian speedway rider (born 1999)

- Born: 23 August 1999 (age 27); Daugavpils, Latvia
- Nationality: Latvian

Career history

Poland
- 2016–2021, 2024–2025: Daugavpils
- 2022–2023: Bydgoszcz

Sweden
- 2025: Solkatterna

Oļegs Mihailovs (born 23 August 1999) is an international speedway rider from Latvia.

== Speedway career ==
Mihailovs won two bronze and one silver medal at the Latvian Individual Speedway Championship in 2017, 2018 and 2020 respectively. He qualified for the 2021 Speedway Grand Prix

In 2021, Mihailovs helped the Latvia national speedway team reach their first major final, when participating in the 2021 Speedway of Nations in Manchester.

In 2022, Mihailovs signed for Polonia Bydgoszcz to ride in the Polish leagues.

Mihailovs was called up to the Latvian squad for the 2024 Speedway of Nations.

== Major results ==
=== World team Championships ===
- 2021 Speedway of Nations - 6th

=== Individual U-21 World Championship ===
- 2018 – 11th – 12 pts
- 2020 – 3rd – 14 pts
