= Luke Becker =

American speedway rider (born 1999)

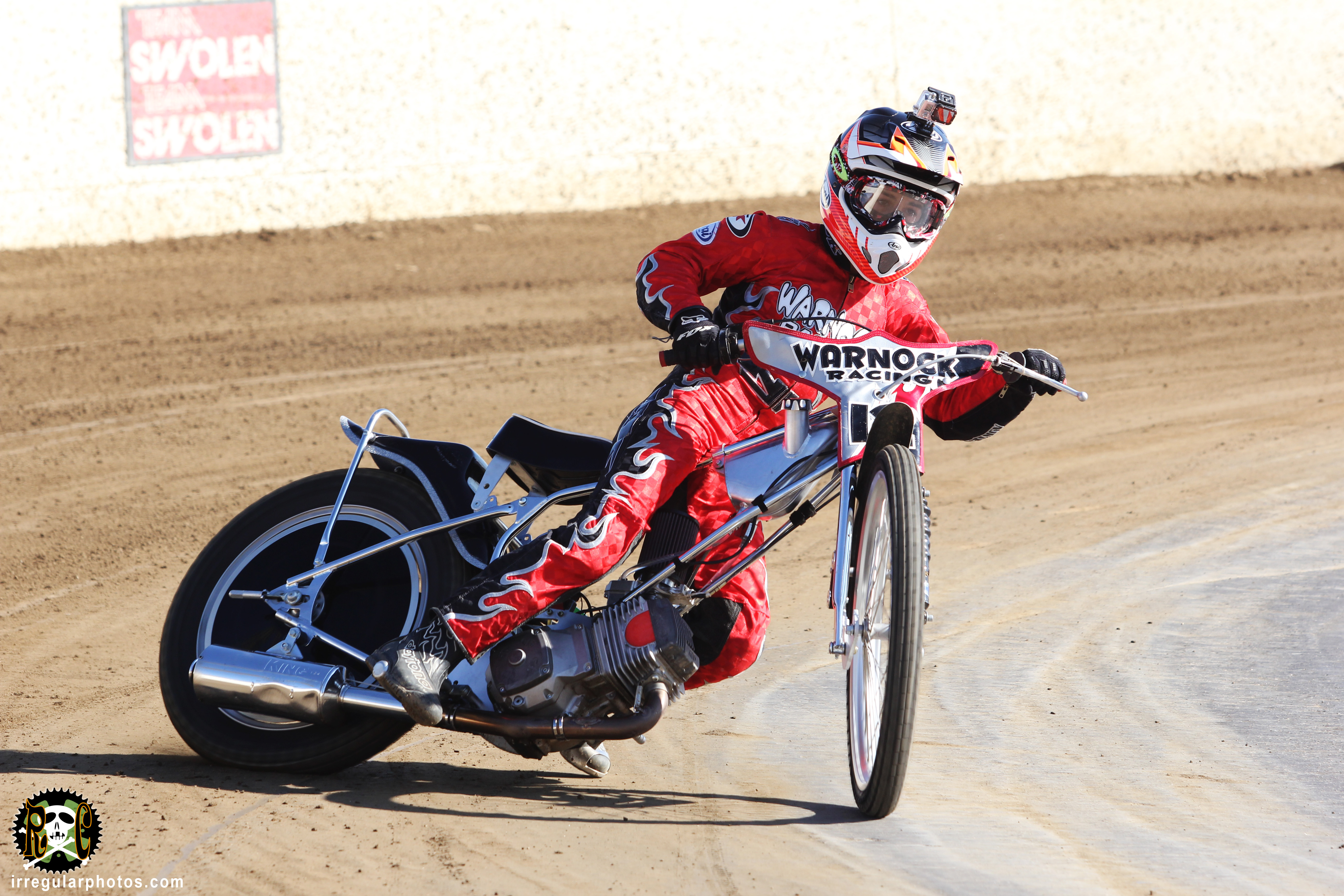
- Becker in 2013
- Born: 11 February 1999 (age 27); Brentwood, California, U.S.

Career history

Great Britain
- 2019–2023: Wolverhampton Wolves
- 2024–2025: Leicester Lions

Poland
- 2018: Rzeszów
- 2019: Rawicz
- 2021–2022, 2024: Łódź
- 2023: Zielona Góra
- 2025: Ostrów

Sweden
- 2021–2022: Dackarna
- 2022: Piraterna
- 2023: Rospiggarna
- 2024: Västervik
- 2025: Indianerna

Denmark
- 2019, 2023–2025: Esbjerg

Individual honours
- 2025: South Australian champion
- 2026: South Australian Champion

Team honours
- 2023: Danish League
- 2025: Premiership KO Cup

Luke Becker (born 11 February 1999) is an American motorcycle speedway rider.

== Career ==
Becker began his British career riding for Wolverhampton Wolves in 2019, the same year that he made his international debut for the United States in the 2019 Speedway of Nations, scoring 11 points.

Unable to ride during 2020 because of COVID-19 cancelled season, Becker continued to ride for Wolverhampton during the SGB Premiership 2021. Becker represented the United States in 2021 and 2022.

In 2022, Becker rode for the Wolverhampton Wolves in the SGB Premiership 2022. After being named Wolves Rider of the Year, he signed for the club for the fourth consecutive season, competing in the SGB Premiership 2023. However, he had a bad start to 2023 when breaking his leg in a crash in Slovakia before his Wolves season got underway. His season got much better when he was instrumental in helping Esbjerg Vikings win the Danish League.

Following the demise of Wolverhampton, Becker joined the Midlands rivals Leicester Lions for the 2024 season. In 2025, he helped Leicester defeat King's Lynn to win the Knockout Cup.

== Major results ==
=== World individual Championship ===
- 2023 Speedway Grand Prix - =24th

=== World Team Championships ===
- 2019 Speedway of Nations - =10th
- 2021 Speedway of Nations - =8th
- 2022 Speedway of Nations - =10th
