= Matias Nielsen =

Danish speedway rider

- Born: 28 July 1999 (age 27); Denmark
- Nationality: Danish

Career history

Denmark
- 2018–2025: Esbjerg

Poland
- 2020-2021, 2024–2025: Poznań
- 2022–2023: Ostrów

Sweden
- 2020: Dackarna
- 2023: Lejonen
- 2024–2025: Västervik

Team honours
- 2020: Team U21 World Championship silver
- 2020, 2022: Team Junior European Championship silver
- 2023: Danish League

Matias Nielsen (born 28 July 1999) is a speedway rider from Denmark.

== Speedway career ==
Nielsen came to prominence in 2019 when he won the silver medal at the Danish Under 21 Individual Speedway Championship. The following season, he repeated the success and also won a silver medal at both the 2020 Team Speedway Junior European Championship and the 2020 Team Speedway Junior World Championship.

In 2022, Nielsen won his second European Junior Championship silver medal and rode for Ostrów in Poland and Esbjerg in Denmark. In 2023, he helped Esbjerg Vikings win the Danish League.
