= Jonas Knudsen (speedway rider) =

Danish speedway rider

- Born: 4 August 2001 (age 25); Ribe, Denmark
- Nationality: Danish

Career history

Denmark
- 2021–2022: SES
- 2019–2023: Esbjerg
- 2025: Holsted

Great Britain
- 2022–2023: Berwick Bandits
- 2024: Redcar Bears
- 2025: Oxford Cheetahs

Sweden
- 2022: Smålänningarna

Poland
- 2023–2024: Piła
- 2025: Zielona Góra

Team honours
- 2023: Danish League

Jonas Knudsen (born 4 August 2001) is a speedway rider from Denmark.

== Speedway career ==
Knudsen began his British speedway career riding for the Berwick Bandits in the SGB Championship 2022. His debut had been delayed significantly following work permit issues.

In 2022, Knudsen competed in the Under-21 World Championship scoring 14 points. In 2023, he re-signed for Berwick for the SGB Championship 2023 and also helped Esbjerg Vikings win the Danish League. In 2024, he signed for Redcar Bears.

Knudsen signed for Oxford Cheetahs for the SGB Championship 2025.

== Family ==
Knudsen's younger brother Jesper is also a professional speedway rider.
