= Jesper Knudsen (speedway rider) =

Danish speedway rider (born 2004)

- Born: 11 July 2004 (age 22); Ribe, Denmark
- Nationality: Danish

Career history

Denmark
- 2021–2025: SES

Poland
- 2022: Leszno
- 2024: Rzeszów
- 2024: Gniezno
- 2025: Rybnik

Individual honours
- 2022: European Individual Junior Champion

Team honours
- 2023: World U23 Team silver

Jesper Knudsen (born 11 July 2004) is a speedway rider from Denmark.

== Speedway career ==
Knudsen is a product of the Skaerbaek Motor Club and was the 250cc world champion in 2020. He signed for Unia Leszno in the Polish Ekstraliga.

In 2022, Knudsen achieved his greatest feat to date after winning the European Individual Junior Championship in Hungary. Also in 2022, he helped SES win the 2022 Danish Super League.

In 2024, Knudsen qualified for the final series of the 2024 SGP2 (the World U21 Championship).

== Family ==
Knudsen's older brother Jonas is also a professional speedway rider.
