= Wilki Krosno =

Polish motorcycle speedway team

Club information
- Track address: Stadion MOSiR Krosno; Legionów 1 Krosno
- Country: Poland
- Founded: 2018
- Team manager: Piotr Świderski/Michal Finfa
- Team captain: Tobiasz Musielak
- League: Ekstraliga 2
- Website: Official website

Club facts
- Colours: Black, Red and Grey
- Nickname: Wolves
- Track size: 396 m
- Track record time: 65.13 seconds
- Track record date: 20 April 2025
- Track record holder: Tobiasz Musielak

Major team honours
Polish Speedway First League	2022

Wilki Krosno (Wolves Krosno) is a Polish motorcycle speedway team based in Krosno. The club operates under the name of Cellfast Wilki Krosno. The team currently competes in the Ekstraliga (the highest division).

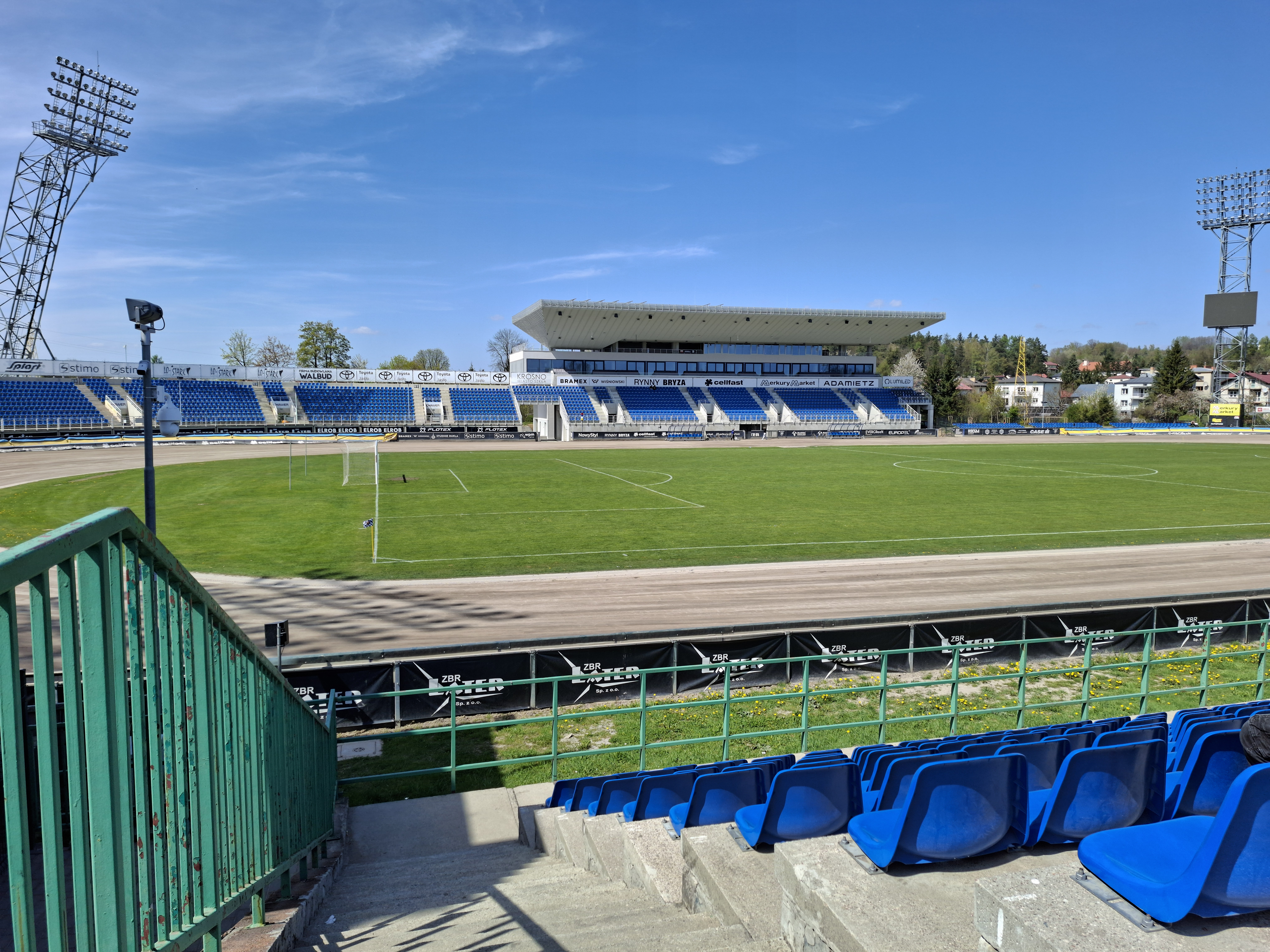
The stadium in 2022

== History of speedway in Krosno ==
=== Legia Krosno ===
During the 1957 Polish speedway season a team called Legia Krosno took part in the third division south using the relatively newly built Stadion MOSiR Krosno. They competed for five seasons in total, until the end of the 1961 season.

=== Karpaty Krosno ===
In 1962, the name of the Krosno team became Karpaty Krosno (Carpathians) after the sports club in Krosno. The team competed in the second division and achieved a best place finish of third in 1963. However, in 1969, due to financial problems, the club's activities were suspended.

=== KKŻ Krosno ===
After nearly 20 years without speedway the city welcomed KKŻ Krosno for the 1988 Polish speedway season. The team spent nine uninspiring years in the second division.

=== ŻKS Krosno ===
For the 1997 Polish speedway season the team were known as ŻKS Krosno (Żużlowy Klub Sportowy w Krośnie). When the Ekstraliga was introduced in 2000, the club were in the 2. Liga. ŻKS ran for five seasons.

=== KSŻ Krosno ===
Yet another name was used for the seasons from 2002 to 2006. The team was called KSŻ Krosno (Krośnieńskie Stowarzyszenie Żużlowe) but the result was the same as the team struggled in the lower tiers of Polish speedway.

=== KSM Krosno ===
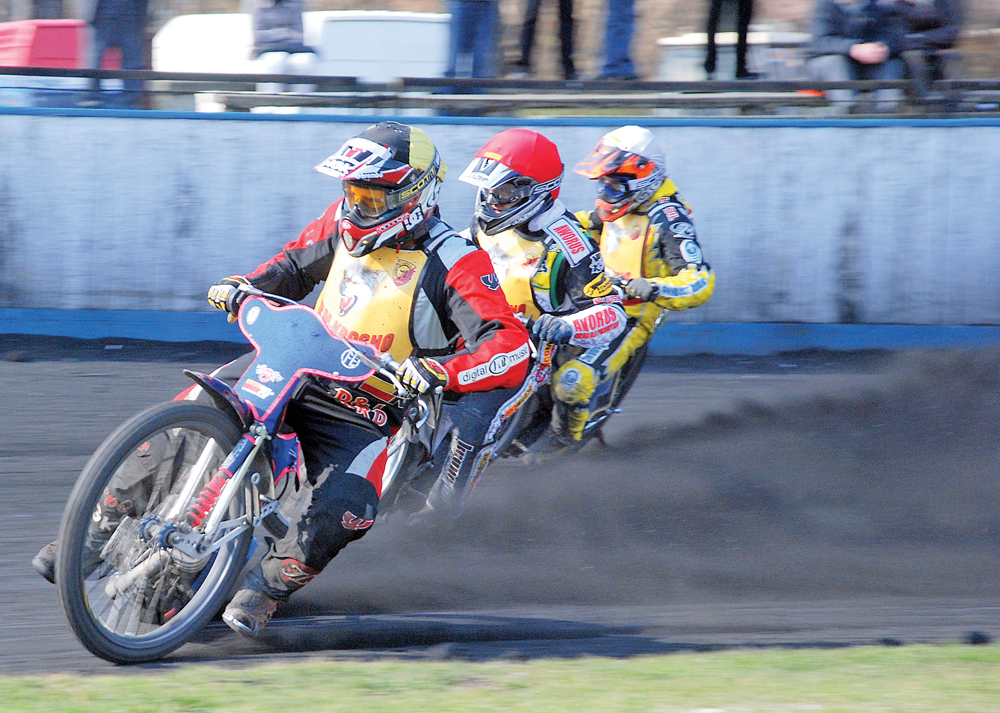
KSM Krosno in 2009

KSM Krosno (Krośnieńskie Stowarzyszenie Motorowe Krosno) was the next name change for the 2007 Polish speedway season. KSM languished near the bottom of 2. Liga for multiple seasons before a regular season 2nd place finish in 2013. The name disappeared at the end of the 2018 season, as the team finished last in 2.Liga.

=== Wilki Krosno ===
In 2018, during a press conference, the authorities of Krosno presented a new club that replaced KSM Krosno. The new club played matches for the first time in 2019.

In 2020, Wolves Krosno won all their matches and advanced to the Polish Speedway First League (Liga.1). Additionally lighting was built in the city's stadium. In 2021, the team lost the final to Ostrovia. In the following year, Wilki Krosno won the final against Zielona Góra and were promoted for the first time in the history of Krosno to the highest division in Poland called the Ekstraliga.

In 2022, the extension of the stadium also began. During the 2022 Polish Speedway season the team won the 1.Liga title.

== Previous teams ==
Extended content

2022 team

- (Latvia) Andžejs Ļebedevs
- (Poland) Tobiasz Musielak
- (Poland) Rafal Karczmarz
- (Poland) Mateusz Szczepaniak
- (Czech Republic) Václav Milík Jr.
- (Poland) Franciszek Karczewski
- (Poland) Krzysztof Sadurski
- (Poland) Kacper Szopa
- (Australia) Keynan Rew
- (Ukraine) Marko Levishyn

2023 team

- (Australia) Jason Doyle
- (Latvia) Andžejs Ļebedevs
- (Czech Republic) Václav Milík Jr.
- (Ukraine) Marko Levishyn
- (Poland) Mateusz Świdnicki
- (Poland) Krzysztof Kasprzak
- (Poland) Krzysztof Sadurski
- (Poland) Kacper Szopa
- (Poland) Szymon Bańdur
- (Poland) Denis Zieliński
- (Poland) Miłosz Grygolec
- (Poland) Patryk Nater
