= Esben Hjerrild =

Danish speedway rider

- Born: 9 April 2002 (age 24); Denmark
- Nationality: Danish

Career history

Denmark
- 2021–2022: Esbjerg Vikings
- 2022–2023: Grindsted
- 2024: Brovst
- 2025: SES

Poland
- 2022: Opole

Sweden
- 2025-2026: Valsarna Hagfors

Team honours
- 2023: World U23 Team silver

Esben Hjerrild (born 9 April 2002) is a motorcycle speedway rider from Denmark.

== Career ==
Hjerrild reached the final of the 2021 Individual Speedway Junior European Championship.

Hjerrild rode in the Danish Speedway League for Grindsted (2022 to 2023) and in the Team Speedway Polish Championship for Kolejarz Opole (2022).

In 2023, Hjerrild was named in the Danish squad by team manager Nicki Pedersen.
