= Nicolai Heiselberg =

Danish speedway rider (born 2005)

- Born: 5 December 2005 (age 20); Denmark
- Nationality: Danish

Career history

Denmark
- 2022–2025: Region Varde

Poland
- 2022: Ostrów

Nicolai Heiselberg (born 5 December 2005) is a motorcycle speedway rider from Denmark.

== Career ==
Heiselberg reached the final of the 2022 Individual Speedway Junior European Championship.

Heiselberg rode in the Danish Speedway League for Region Varde Elitesport from 2022 to 2023 and Ostrów U24 in the Polish league.

In 2023, Heiselberg was named in the Danish squad by team manager Nicki Pedersen.
