= Francis Gusts =

Latvian speedway rider

- Born: 2 January 2003 (age 23); Riga, Latvia
- Nationality: Latvian

Career history

Poland
- 2020: Lokomotiv Daugavpils
- 2022, 2025: Poznań
- 2023–2024: Wrocław

Sweden
- 2021–2022: Masarna
- 2023: Lejonen
- 2024: Vargarna
- 2025: Indianerna

Denmark
- 2022–2023: Grindsted
- 2025: SES

Great Britain
- 2025: Oxford

Speedway Grand Prix statistics
- Starts: 2
- Finalist: 0 times
- Winner: 0 times

Individual honours
- 2021: European Junior Champion

Team honours
- 2023: World U23 Team bronze

Francis Gusts (born 2 January 2003) is an international speedway rider from Latvia.

== Speedway career ==
Gusts became the European Junior Champion after winning the 2021 Individual Speedway Junior European Championship in his home country. During the same year, Gusts, riding with riding partners Ernests Matjusonoks and Ričards Ansviesulis, won the European U19 pairs title.

In 2021, Gusts helped the Latvia national speedway team qualify for the final of the 2021 Speedway of Nations (the World team Championships of speedway). He competed in the 2021 Individual Speedway Junior World Championship He signed for Masarna for the 2021 and 2022 Swedish speedway seasons.

In 2022, Gusts finished in tenth place during the World Under-21 Championship in the 2022 SGP2 and helped PSŻ Poznań win the 2022 2.Liga. In 2023, he rode in the Latvian Grand Prix and won the bronze medal in the Team Speedway Under-21 World Championship, after finishing third at the 2023 Speedway of Nations 2.

In 2024, Gusts qualified for the final series of the 2024 SGP2 (the World U21 Championship). In 2025, Gusts signed for the Oxford Spires making his British league debut season but failed to impress and was replaced by Craig Cook.

== Major results ==
=== World individual Championship ===
- 2023 Speedway Grand Prix - =24th
- 2024 Speedway Grand Prix - 29th

=== World team Championships ===
- 2021 Speedway of Nations - 6th
