= Mads Hansen (speedway rider) =

Danish speedway rider

- Born: 26 June 2000 (age 26)
- Nationality: Danish

Career history

Denmark
- 2017–2019: Region Varde
- 2021–2025: SES

Sweden
- 2020–2025: Västervik

Poland
- 2018–2020: Opole
- 2022: AC Landshut
- 2023: Gdańsk
- 2024–2025: Częstochowa

Germany
- 2017–2018: Wittstock

Individual honours
- 2017: World U-19 champion
- 2018: European U19 Champion

Team honours
- 2023: European Pairs silver
- 2025: Swedish champions

Mads Hansen (born 26 June 2000) is a Danish speedway rider.

== Career ==
Hansen was the European Under-19 champion in 2018. After finishing fifth during the 2020 Individual Speedway Junior World Championship, he won the first series race of the 2021 Individual Speedway Junior World Championship, which was held at Stralsund.

In 2022, Hansen helped SES win the 2022 Danish Super League. In 2023 he won the Golden Helmet in Brokstedt and later in October 2023, he paired up with Rasmus Jensen to win a silver medal at the European Pairs championship.

On 23 September 2025, Hansen overtook Michael Jepsen Jensen in the final and decisive heat against Smederna, which led to his team Västervik to its first Swedish Championship in 20 years.

== Major results ==
=== World individual Championship ===
- 2021 Speedway Grand Prix - 25th (0pts)
- 2022 Speedway Grand Prix - 20th (7pts)
- 2023 Speedway Grand Prix - 18th (10pts)
