= 2018 Danish speedway season =

Season of speedway in Denmark

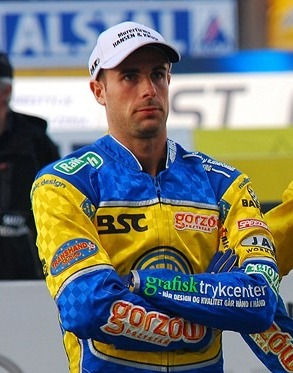
- Niels-Kristian Iversen won his seventh consecutive Swedish title, joining Nicki Pedersen in second place behind Ole Olsen in the all time list.

== Individual ==
=== Individual Championship ===
The 2018 Danish Individual Speedway Championship was the 2018 edition of the Danish Individual Speedway Championship. The final was staged over a single round, at the Granly Speedway Arena. Niels Kristian Iversen won his seventh national title, tying Nicki Pedersen for second on the all-time list. It was also only the second time in the history of the competition that a rider won seven successive titles, with Ole Olsen also completing the feat in 1973. Mikkel Michelsen finished second, with Pedersen third and Kenneth Bjerre fourth.

Each rider competed in five rides, with the four top scorers racing in an additional heat. The points from the additional heat were then added to the previous score from the five riders. The winner was the rider who accumulated the most points in all of their rides, and not the rider who won the additional heat.

Final

- 4 August 2018, held at the Granly Speedway Arena, Esbjerg

Pos.	Rider	Points	Details
1	Niels Kristian Iversen (Esbjerg)	16	(3,3,3,3,3,1)
2	Mikkel Michelsen (Slangerup)	13	(2,3,3,2,0,3)
3	Nicki Pedersen (Holsted)	12	(3,2,0,3,2,2)
4	Kenneth Bjerre (Holstebro)	11	(3,2,2,2,2,0)
5	Mads Korneliussen (Region Varde)	10	(2,1,3,1,3)
6	Michael Jepsen Jensen (Slangerup)	9	(3,3,2,W,1)
7	René Bach (Esbjerg)	9	(2,3,1,2,1)
8	Thomas Jørgensen (Region Varde)	7	(1,1,2,0,3)
9	Mads Hansen (Region Varde)	6	(2,0,0,3,1)
10	Peter Kildemand (Fjelsted)	6	(0,2,0,3,1)
11	Andreas Lyager (Slangerup)	6	(0,1,3,2,0)
12	Patrick Hougaard (Grindsted)	6	(1,0,2,1,2)
13	Mikkel Bech (Region Varde)	5	(0,0,1,1,3)
14	Hans N. Andersen (Region Varde)	5	(1,2,1,1,0)
15	Rasmus Jensen (Holsted)	4	(1,1,0,0,2)
16	Frederik Jakobsen (Fjelsted)	1	(-,-,1,-,-)
17	Claus Vissing (Grindsted)	0	(0,0,T,0,U)
	Jonas Seifert-Salk (Slangerup)	DNR	

=== U21 Championship ===
Andreas Lyager won the U21 Championship at Outrup on 3 August.

Pos.	Rider	Points
1	Andreas Lyager	14+3
2	Jonas Jeppesen	12+2
3	Frederik Jakobsen	13+0
4	Jonas Seifert-Salk	11+1
5	Patrick Hansen	10
6	Jonas Knudsen	10
7	Sam Jensen	9
8	Mads Hansen	8
9	Tim Sørensen	7
10	Christian Thaysen	7
11	Martin Steen Hansen	7
12	Matias Nielsen	5
13	Marius Nielsen	4
14	Kasper Andersen	4
15	Jannik B. Sorensen	4
16	Emil Portner	2
17	Emil Breum (res)	1

== Team ==
=== Danish Speedway League ===
The Danish Speedway League was won by Region Varde for the fifth time, but the second known by the name of Region Varde.

Pos	Team	P	W	D	L	Pts	BP	Total
1	Region Varde	12	9	1	2	19	5	24
2	Fjelsted	12	8	1	3	17	5	22
3	Slangerup	12	7	0	5	14	3	17
4	Holsted Tigers	12	5	0	7	10	3	13
5	Grindsted	12	3	4	5	10	3	13
6	Holstebro	12	3	3	6	9	2	11
7	Esbjerg Vikings	12	2	1	9	5	0	5

Semi Final

Pos	Team	Pts
1	Slangerup	42
2	Holsted	40
3	Grindsted	26
4	Holstebro	24

Super Final

Pos	Team	Pts	Riders
1	Region Varde	40	Bech 13, Korneliussen 11, H Andersen 7, Jørgensen 6, M Hansen 3, Thyme dns
2	Slangerup	34	Lyager 12, Michelsen 9, Hansen 10, Wölbert 6, Eklöf 4, Seifert-Salk 1, M Nielsen dns
3	Holsted	33	Klindt 14, N Pedersen 8, R Jensen 6, S Jensen 3, Jeppesen 0, Mortensen dns
4	Fjelsted	29	Thomsen 10, Kildemand 8, Aarnio 6, F Jakobsen 3, Thaysen 2, Basso dns

=== Teams ===
Region Varde

- (Denmark) Hans Andersen
- (Denmark) Mikkel Bech
- (Denmark) Mads Korneliussen
- (Denmark) Mads Hansen
- (Denmark) Thomas Jørgensen
- (Denmark) Michael Thyme
- (Denmark) Tobias Thomsen
- (Denmark) Mikkel B. Andersen
- (Australia) Troy Batchelor
- (Ukraine) Andriej Karpov

Slangerup

- (Denmark) Mikkel Michelsen
- (Denmark) Andreas Lyager
- (Denmark) Kenneth Kruse Hansen
- (Denmark) Michael Jepsen Jensen
- (Sweden) Linus Eklof
- (Russia) Andrey Kudriashov
- (Sweden) Filip Hjelmland
- (Germany) Kevin Wolbert
- (Denmark) Jacob Bukhave
- (Denmark) Jonas Seifert-Salk
- (Denmark) Marius Nielsen
- (Denmark) Jan Graversen

Holsted

- (Denmark) Nicki Pedersen
- (Denmark) Nicolai Klindt
- (Denmark) Rasmus Jensen
- (Denmark) Sam Jensen
- (Denmark) Sebastian A. Mortensen
- (Denmark) Jonas Jeppesen
- (Denmark) Michael Palm Toft
- (Denmark) Nicklas Porsing
- (Australia) Sam Masters
- (Denmark) Martin Steen Hansen
- (Poland) Dawid Lampart

Fjelsted

- (Denmark) Anders Thomsen
- (Denmark) Peter Kildemand
- (Denmark) Benjamin Basso
- (Denmark) Frederik Jakobsen
- (Poland) Grzegorz Zengota
- (Finland) Tero Aarnio
- (Denmark) Jason Jørgensen
- (Denmark) Christian Thaysen

Esbjerg

- (Denmark) Niels Kristian Iversen
- (Denmark) Lasse Bjerre
- (Denmark) René Bach
- (Denmark) Mark Beyer
- (Denmark) Matias Nielsen
- (Denmark) Tim Sørensen
- (Australia) Rohan Tungate
- (Poland) Damian Adamczak
- (Poland) Marcel Kajzer
- (Poland) Adrian Gala
- (Norway) Lasse Fredriksen
- (Germany) Kai Huckenbeck
- (Australia) Jye Etheridge

Grindsted

- (Denmark) Nikolaj Busk Jakobsen
- (England) Robert Lambert
- (Denmark) Kasper Andersen
- (Denmark) Patrick Hougaard
- (Denmark) Claus Vissing
- (Denmark) Patrick Hansen
- (Poland) Kacper Gomolski
- (England) Adam Ellis
- (Poland) Przemyslaw Pawlicki
- (Denmark) Emil Engstrom

Holstebro

- (Denmark) Kenneth Bjerre
- (Denmark) Ulrich Ostergaard
- (Denmark) Bjarne Pedersen
- (Denmark) Kasper Lykke Nielsen
- (Denmark) Emil Grondal
- (Denmark) Jonas B. Andersen
- (Denmark) Lasse Portner
- (Denmark) Emil Pørtner
