= 2017 Danish speedway season =

Season of speedway in Denmark

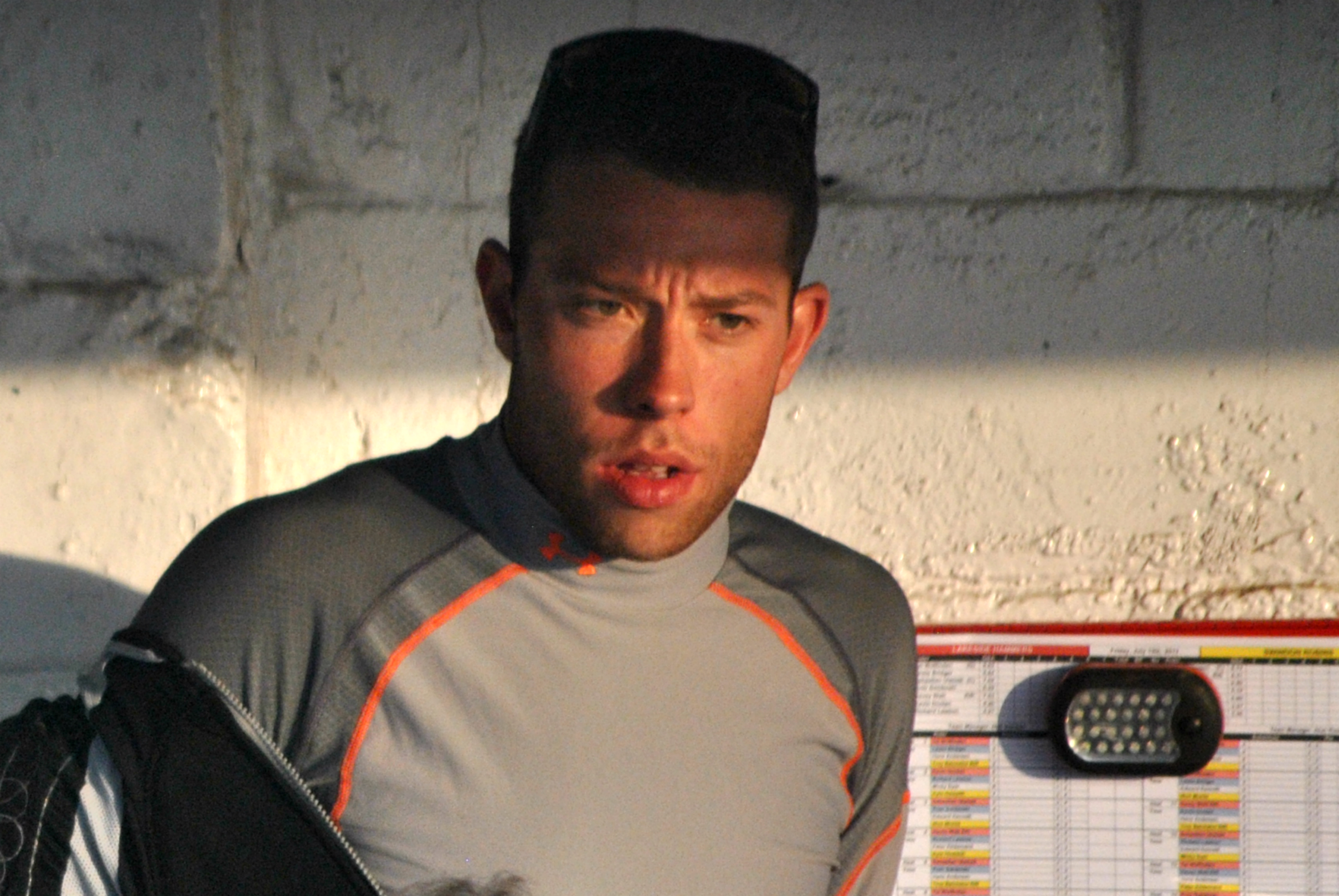
- Peter Kildemand top scored in the Super Final for Fjelsted.

== Individual ==
=== Individual Championship ===
The 2017 Danish Individual Speedway Championship was the 2017 edition of the Danish Individual Speedway Championship. The final was staged over a single round, at Fjelsted. For the sixth year in a row, the title was won by Niels Kristian Iversen, who beat Michael Jepsen Jensen, Mikkel Bech and Kenneth Bjerre. It was the first time the title had been won by the same rider for six successive years since 1972, when Ole Olsen managed the feat.

Each rider competed in five rides, with the four top scorers racing in an additional heat. The points from the additional heat were then added to the previous score from the five riders. The winner was the rider who accumulated the most points in all of their rides, and not the rider who won the additional heat.

Final

- 4 August 2017, held at Fjelsted

Pos.	Rider	Points	Details
1	Niels Kristian Iversen (Esbjerg)	17	(3,3,3,2,3+3)
2	Michael Jepsen Jensen (Slangerup)	14	(1,3,2,3,3+2)
3	Mikkel Bech Jensen (Region Varde)	13	(3,2,1,3,3+1)
4	Kenneth Bjerre (Holstebro)	12	(2,3,3,1,3+0)
5	Mads Korneliussen (Region Varde)	10	(3,3,0,3,1)
6	Peter Kildemand (Fjelsted)	10	(2,2,3,3,U)
7	Hans N. Andersen (Region Varde)	10	(3,1,3,1,2)
8	Bjarne Pedersen (Holsted)	8	(0,2,2,2,2)
9	Jonas Jeppesen (Holsted)	6	(2,1,2,1,0)
10	Patrick Hansen (Esbjerg)	5	(0,0,1,2,2)
11	René Bach (Esbjerg)	5	(0,2,W,2,1)
12	Mikkel Michelsen (Slangerup)	5	(1,1,1,1,1)
13	Anders Thomsen (Fjelsted)	4	(1,0,1,0,2)
14	Jonas Andersen (Holstebro)	4	(2,1,0,0,1)
15	Ulrich Østergaard (Holstebro)	2	(W,0,2,0,D)
16	Mikkel B. Andersen (Region Varde)	1	(1,-,-,-,-)
17	Martin Steen Hansen (Holsted)	0	(0,0,0)
18	Sam Jensen (Holsted)	0	(0,0)

=== U21 Championship ===
Sam Jensen won the U21 Championship at Holsted on 30 July.

Pos.	Rider	Points
1	Sam Jensen	11+3
2	Andreas Lyager	11+2
3	Jonas Jeppesen	12+1
4	Mikkel B. Andersen	11+0
5	Frederik Jakobsen	11
6	Kasper Andersen	10
7	Patrick Hansen	9
8	Christian Thaysen	9
9	Tim Sørensen	8
10	Mads Hansen	8
11	Emil Engstrøm	6
12	Jonas Jensen	5
13	Matias Nielsen	4
14	Kenneth Jurgensen	2
15	Emil Pørtner	2
16	Sebastian Mortensen	2

== Team ==
=== Danish Speedway League ===
The Danish Speedway League was won by Fjelsted for the fifth time, despite finishing third in the regular season table.

Munkebo withdrew from the league due to noise related issues with their local council.

Pos	Team	P	W	D	L	Pts	BP	Total
1	Slangerup	12	8	2	2	18	5	23
2	Region Varde	12	6	1	5	13	5	18
3	Fjelsted	12	7	0	5	14	3	17
4	Holsted Tigers	12	5	2	5	12	3	15
5	Esbjerg Vikings	12	6	1	5	13	2	15
6	Holstebro	12	4	0	8	8	2	10
7	Grindsted	12	2	0	10	4	1	5

Super Final

Pos	Team	Pts	Riders
1	Fjelsted	41	Kildemand 12, F Jakobsen 11, Thomsen 7, Thaysen 6, Hougaard 5
2	Region Varde	40	Bech 13, H Andersen 12, Korneliussen 10, M Hansen 4, MB Andersen 1
3	Slangerup	37	Michelsen 11, Hansen 10, Jepsen Jensen 9, Lyager 4, Nissen 3
4	Holsted	14	Bjarne Pedersen 8, Jeppesen 2, Buczkowski 2, Lampart 1, S Jensen 1

=== Teams ===
Fjelsted

- (Denmark) Anders Thomsen
- (Denmark) Peter Kildemand
- (Denmark) Patrick Hougaard
- (Denmark) Nikolaj Busk Jakobsen
- (Denmark) Frederik Jakobsen
- (Poland) Kacper Woryna
- (Denmark) Christian Thaysen

Region Varde

- (Denmark) Hans Andersen
- (Denmark) Mikkel Bech
- (Denmark) Mads Korneliussen
- (Denmark) Mads Hansen
- (Denmark) Mikkel B. Andersen
- (Australia) Troy Batchelor
- (Australia) Rohan Tungate
- (Denmark) Marc Randrup
- (Denmark) Morten Risager
- (Denmark) Thomas Jørgensen

Slangerup

- (Denmark) Mikkel Michelsen
- (Denmark) Kenneth Kruse Hansen
- (Denmark) Michael Jepsen Jensen
- (Denmark) Andreas Lyager
- (Denmark) Kenni Nissen
- (Denmark) Jonas Seifert-Salk
- (Denmark) Jan Graversen
- (Denmark) Jesper B. Monberg

Holsted

- (Denmark) Nicki Pedersen
- (Denmark) Bjarne Pedersen
- (Poland) Dawid Lampart
- (Denmark) Rasmus Jensen
- (Poland) Krzysztof Buczkowski
- (Denmark) Sam Jensen
- (Denmark) Jonas Jeppesen
- (Denmark) Martin Steen Hansen

Esbjerg

- (Denmark) Niels Kristian Iversen
- (Denmark) Nicolai Klindt
- (Denmark) René Bach
- (Denmark) Michael Palm Toft
- (Denmark) Kasper Andersen
- (Denmark) Patrick Hansen
- (Denmark) Tim Sørensen
- (Poland) Artur Czaja
- (Sweden) Oliver Berntzon
- (Poland) Piotr Protasiewicz
- (Poland) Norbert Kościuch

Holstebro

- (Denmark) Kenneth Bjerre
- (Denmark) Ulrich Ostergaard
- (Denmark) Kasper Lykke Nielsen
- (Denmark) Lasse Bjerre
- (Denmark) Leon Madsen
- (Denmark) Jonas B. Andersen
- (Denmark) Lasse Portner
- (Denmark) Tobias Thomsen
- (Denmark) Peter Karger
- (Denmark) Emil Pørtner

Grindsted

- (Poland) Przemyslaw Pawlicki
- (Denmark) Claus Vissing
- (Denmark) Emil Grondal
- (Denmark) Jesper Søgaard-Kristiansen
- (France) David Bellego
- (Australia) Nick Morris
- (Poland) Krystian Pieszczek
- (Poland) Mateusz Szczepaniak
- (Poland) Grzegorz Walasek
- (Germany) Martin Smolinski
- (Denmark) Nicklas Porsing
- (Denmark) Emil Engstrom
- (Denmark) Patrick Hansen
