= 2019 Danish speedway season =

Season of speedway in Denmark

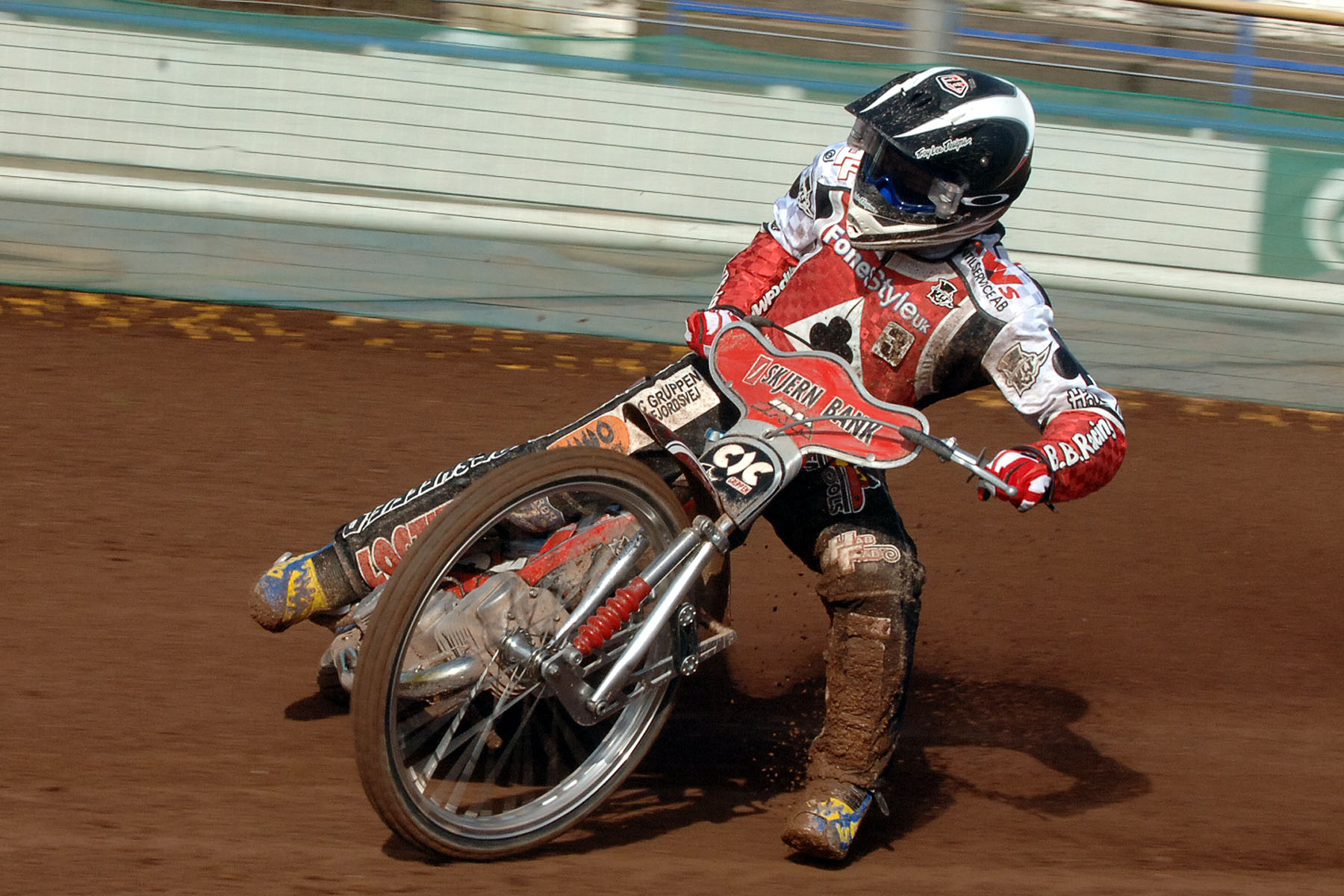
- Kenneth Bjerre became the 2019 champion of Denmark

== Individual ==
=== Individual Championship ===
The 2019 Danish Individual Speedway Championship was the 2019 edition of the Danish Individual Speedway Championship.

The final was staged over a single round, at the Holsted Speedway Center. Kenneth Bjerre won his second national title, having previously triumphed in 2010. Seven-time champion Niels Kristian Iversen finished second, with Rasmus Jensen third and Bjarne Pedersen fourth.

Each rider competed in five rides, with the four top scorers racing in an additional heat. The points from the additional heat were then added to the previous score from the five riders. The winner was the rider who accumulated the most points in all of their rides, and not the rider who won the additional heat.

Final

- 30 May 2019, held at the Holsted Speedway Center, Holsted

Pos.	Rider	Points	Details
1	Kenneth Bjerre (Holsted)	18	(3,3,3,3,3,3)
2	Niels Kristian Iversen (Esbjerg)	13	(3,3,3,0,2,2)
3	Rasmus Jensen (Holsted)	12	(3,2,2,2,2,1)
4	Bjarne Pedersen (Esbjerg)	10	(0,2,3,2,3,0)
5	Nicki Pedersen (Holsted)	10	(2,3,1,3,1)
6	Michael Jepsen Jensen (Region Varde)	10	(2,3,2,2,1)
7	Frederik Jakobsen (Fjelsted)	8	(2,1,2,3,0)
8	René Bach (Holsted)	8	(1,0,2,3,2)
9	Mikkel Michelsen (Slangerup)	8	(1,2,1,1,3)
10	Mikkel Bech (Region Varde)	8	(2,1,1,2,2)
11	Jonas Jeppesen (Esbjerg)	6	(W,2,3,0,1)
12	Nicolai Klindt (Holsted)	4	(3,0,0,0,1)
13	Mads Korneliussen (Region Varde)	4	(0,0,T,1,3)
14	Nikolaj Busk Jakobsen (Grindsted)	3	(1,1,0,1,0)
15	Sam Jensen (Holsted)	3	(1,1,1,0,0)
16	Claus Vissing (Grindsted)	1	(0,0,0,1,U)
	Jonas Seifert-Salk (Slangerup)	DNR	
	Mads Hansen (Region Varde)	DNR	

=== U21 Championship ===
Jonas Jeppesen won the U21 Championship for the second time.

Pos.	Rider	Points
1	Jonas Jeppesen	13+3
2	Matias Nielsen	13+2
3	Marcus Birkemose	14+1
4	Jonas Seifert-Salk	13+0
5	Mads Hansen	12
6	Jonas Knudsen	10
7	Tim Sørensen	8
8	Patrick Hansen	7
9	Christian Thaysen	7
10	Emil Breum	6
11	Esben Hjerrild	5
12	Kenneth Jurgensen	5
13	Sebastian Mortensen	4
14	Jannik Sorensen	2
15	Nicklas Clausen	1
16	Marius Nielsen	0
17	Kevin Juhl Pedersen	0

== Team ==
=== Danish Speedway League ===
The Danish Speedway League was won by Fjelsted for the sixth time, despite finishing in fifth place in the regular season table.

Pos	Team	P	W	D	L	Pts	BP	Total
1	Holsted Tigers	10	9	0	1	18	5	23
2	Slangerup	10	6	1	3	13	3	16
3	Esbjerg Vikings	10	5	0	5	10	3	13
4	Region Varde	10	4	0	6	8	3	11
5	Fjelsted	10	4	1	5	9	1	10
6	Grindsted	10	0	2	8	2	0	2

Play offs

team1	team2	score
Esbjerg	Grindsted	55-32, 45–42
Region Varde	Fjelsted	38-45, 28–56

Super Final

Pos	Team	Pts	Riders
1	Fjelsted	38	Thomsen 12, Kildemand 11, Jørgensen 6, F Jakobsen 5, Basso 4
2	Esbjerg	35	Iversen 13, B Pedersen, 8 Mt Nielsen 8, Jeppesen 5, Becker 1, Knudsen dns
3	Holsted	33	Klindt 10, Bjerre 10, Bach 8, R Jensen 3, S Jensen 2, Breum dns
4	Slangerup	26	Lyager 8, Seifert-Salk 7, Michelsen 5, Nissen 4, Pørtner 2, Lampart 0

=== Teams ===
Fjelsted

- (Denmark) Anders Thomsen
- (Denmark) Peter Kildemand
- (Denmark) Frederik Jakobsen
- (Denmark) Benjamin Basso
- (Ukraine) Aleksandr Loktaev
- (Denmark) Jason Jørgensen
- (Denmark) Emil Engstrom

Esbjerg

- (Denmark) Niels Kristian Iversen
- (Australia) Jason Doyle
- (Denmark) Bjarne Pedersen
- (United States) Luke Becker
- (Denmark) Matias Nielsen
- (Denmark) Jonas Knudsen
- (Denmark) Jonas Jeppesen
- (Netherlands) Theo Pijper
- (Denmark) Mark Beyer
- (Denmark) Jannik B. Sorensen
- (Poland) Artur Czaja
- (Poland) Kamil Brzozowski

Holsted

- (Denmark) Nicki Pedersen
- (Denmark) René Bach
- (Denmark) Rasmus Jensen
- (Denmark) Sam Jensen
- (Denmark) Nicolai Klindt
- (Denmark) Kenneth Bjerre
- (Denmark) Emil Breum
- (Denmark) Sebastian A. Mortensen

Slangerup

- (Poland) Bartosz Zmarzlik
- (Denmark) Mikkel Michelsen
- (Denmark) Andreas Lyager
- (Germany) Kevin Wolbert
- (Denmark) Jonas Seifert-Salk
- (Poland) Dawid Lampart
- (Denmark) Emil Pørtner
- (Poland) Edward Mazur
- (Denmark) Marius Nielsen
- (Denmark) Jacob Bukhave
- (Denmark) Kenni Nissen
- (Australia) Rohan Tungate

Region Varde

- (Denmark) Michael Jepsen Jensen
- (Denmark) Mikkel Bech
- (Denmark) Mads Korneliussen
- (Denmark) Mads Hansen
- (Denmark) Tim Sørensen
- (Denmark) Patrick Hansen
- (Denmark) Michael Thyme
- (Poland) Tomasz Gapiński
- (Ukraine) Andriej Karpov

Grindsted

- (Denmark) Hans Andersen
- (Denmark) Nikolaj Busk Jakobsen
- (Denmark) Emil Grondal
- (Australia) Jaimon Lidsey
- (Denmark) Mikkel B. Andersen
- (Denmark) Thomas Jørgensen
- (Denmark) Kenneth B. Jurgensen
- (Denmark) Kasper Andersen
- (England) Adam Ellis
- (Australia) Max Fricke
- (Denmark) Marcus Birkemose
- (Denmark) Morten Piepenbrinck
