= 2021 Danish speedway season =

Season of speedway in Denmark

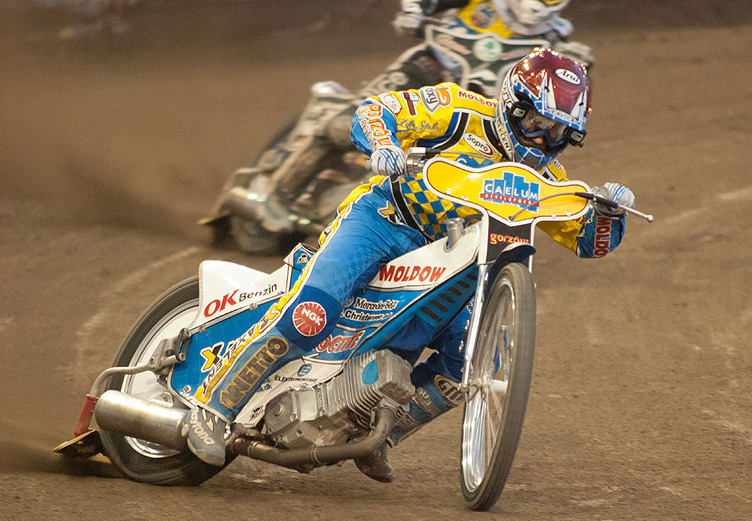
- Nicki Pedersen, captain and top scorer for Holsted in the Super Final.

== Individual ==
=== Individual Championship ===
The 2021 Danish Individual Speedway Championship was the 2021 edition of the Danish Individual Speedway Championship. As in 2020, the final was staged over a single round at the Vojens Speedway Center. For the second year in a row, the title was won by Anders Thomsen, who beat Nicki Pedersen, Leon Madsen and Kenneth Bjerre.

Each rider competed in five rides, with the four top scorers racing in an additional heat. The points from the additional heat were then added to the previous score from the five riders. The winner was the rider who accumulated the most points in all of their rides, and not the rider who won the additional heat.

Final

- 9 June 2021, held at the Vojens

Pos.	Rider	Points	Details
1	Anders Thomsen (Sønderjylland)	17	(3,3,3,3,3,2)
2	Nicki Pedersen (Holsted)	15	(3,2,3,2,2,3)
3	Leon Madsen (Nordjysk)	14	(2,3,2,3,3,1)
4	Kenneth Bjerre (Grindsted)	11	(1,3,3,1,3,0)
5	Nicolai Klindt (Sønderjylland)	17	(3,3,3,2,3+3)
6	Mikkel Michelsen (Slangerup)	10	(3,3,2,D,2)
7	Mads Hansen (Sønderjylland)	8	(1,1,3,2,1)
8	Andreas Lyager (Slangerup)	7	(3,0,1,2,1)
9	Rasmus Jensen (Holsted)	7	(D,2,1,1,3)
10	Patrick Hansen (Grindsted)	6	(1,0,2,3,U)
11	Frederik Jakobsen (Fjelsted)	4	(0,1,0,3,0)
12	Marcus Birkemose (Fjelsted)	4	(2,2,0,0,D)
13	René Bach (Holsted)	4	(1,1,0,0,2)
14	Michael Jepsen Jensen (Slangerup)	4	(2,D,0,1,1)
15	Niels Kristian Iversen (Esbjerg)	4	(2,1,2,1,0)
16	Jonas Jeppesen (Fjelsted)	2	(W,W,1,1,D)
	Lasse Bjerre (Region Varde)	DNR	
	Claus Vissing (Nordjysk)	DNR	

=== U21 Championship ===
Tim Sørensen won the U21 Championship.

Pos.	Rider	Points
1	Tim Sørensen	14
2	Emil Pørtner	12
3	Benjamin Basso	11
4	Marius Nielsen	9
5	Bastian Borke	9
6	Mads Hansen	8
7	Kevin Juhl Pedersen	8
8	Esben Hjerrild	8
9	Emil Breum	8
10	Nick Agertoft	7
11	Jonas Knudsen	7
12	Nicolai Heiselberg	6
13	Silas Hoegh	5
14	Jesper Knudsen	4
15	Chris Waennerstrom	2
16	Patrick Baek	0

== Team ==
=== Danish Speedway League ===
The Danish Speedway League was won by Holsted Tigers for the 15th time.

A team called Nordjysk (formerly Brovst Speedway Club) entered the league.

Pos	Team	P	W	D	L	Pts	BP	Total
1	Sønderjylland	6	5	0	1	11	1	12
2	Slangerup	7	5	0	2	10¾	¾	11½
3	Grindsted	7	5	0	2	10	0	10
4	Fjelsted	7	4	0	3	9	1	10
5	Holsted Tigers	7	4	0	3	8¾	¾	9½
6	Region Varde	6	3	0	3	6½	½	7
7	Nordjysk	7	1	0	6	2	0	2
8	Esbjerg Vikings	7	0	0	7	½	½	1

Semi-finals (teams ranked 3–6)

Team	Score	Riders
Holsted Tigers	45	Bach 12, N Pedersen 11, Rasmus Jensen 11, S Jensen 6, Marius Nielsen 5
Team Fjelsted	39	Birekmose 14, Jakobsen 12, Kildemand 7, Basso 6, Bergé 0
Region Varde	28	Gapiński 12, Sørensen 9, Hellstrom-Bangs 4, Gała 2, Protasiewicz 1
Grinstead	20	Bjerre 7, P Hansen 6, Juhl Pedersen 5, Busk Jakobsen 2, Bellego 0

Super Final

Team	Score	Riders
Holsted Tigers	43	N Pedersen 14, Bach 11, S Jensen 9, R Jensen 7, Marius Nielsen 1
SES	37	Thomsen 14, Huckenbeck 10, Klindt 7, Hansen 3, Knudsen 3
Slangerup	34	Michelsen 10, Lyager 10, Tungate 7, Stark 4, Hoegh 3
Team Fjelsted	19	Jakobsen 8, Jeppesen 7, Birkemose 2, Bergé 1, Basso 1

=== Teams ===
Holsted

- (Denmark) Nicki Pedersen
- (Denmark) René Bach
- (Denmark) Rasmus Jensen
- (Denmark) Mark Beyer
- (Denmark) Kenneth Hansen
- (Denmark) Marius Nielsen
- (Denmark) Sam Jensen
- (Poland) Grzegorz Zengota
- (Australia) Brady Kurtz

Sønderjylland Elite Speedway

- (Denmark) Mads Hansen
- (Denmark) Anders Thomsen
- (Denmark) Nicolai Klindt
- (Denmark) Jonas Knudsen
- (Germany) Kai Huckenbeck
- (Denmark) Jesper Knudsen
- (Denmark) Hans Andersen
- (Germany) Norick Blödorn

Slangerup

- (Denmark) Mikkel Michelsen
- (Denmark) Andreas Lyager
- (Denmark) Jonas Seifert-Salk
- (Denmark) Michael Jepsen Jensen
- (Australia) Rohan Tungate
- (Denmark) Emil Pørtner
- (Denmark) Silas Hoegh
- (Poland) Daniel Jeleniewski
- (Denmark) Johannes Stark

Fjelsted

- (Denmark) Frederik Jakobsen
- (Denmark) Peter Kildemand
- (Poland) Patryk Wojdylo
- (Denmark) Marcus Birkemose
- (Denmark) Peter Kildemand
- (Sweden) Linus Sundström
- (Denmark) Benjamin Basso
- (France) Dimitri Bergé
- (Denmark) Rasmus Pedersen
- (Denmark) Stian V Nielsen
- (Denmark) Ulrich Østergaard

Grindsted

- (Denmark) Kenneth Bjerre
- (Denmark) Nikolaj Busk Jakobsen
- (Denmark) Patrick Hansen
- (Denmark) Kevin Juhl Pedersen
- (France) David Bellego
- (Poland) Adrian Cyfer
- (Poland) Lars Skupień

Region Varde

- (Sweden) Peter Ljung
- (Denmark) Tim Sørensen
- (Ukraine) Aleksandr Loktaev
- (Poland) Tomasz Gapiński
- (Denmark) Lasse Bjerre
- (Poland) Piotr Protasiewicz
- (Sweden) Philip Hellström Bängs
- (Poland) Adrian Gala

Nordjysk

- (Denmark) Leon Madsen
- (Finland) Timo Lahti
- (Denmark) Thomas Jørgensen
- (Denmark) Claus Vissing
- (Italy) Paco Castagna
- (Germany) Erik Riss
- (Denmark) Jonas Andersen
- (Denmark) Mikkel Andersen
- (Denmark) Tobias Thomsen
- (Poland) Damian Drozdz
- (Poland) Daniel Kaczmarek
- (Sweden) Filip Hjelmland
- (Slovenia) Matic Ivačič

Esbjerg

- (Denmark) Niels Kristian Iversen
- (Denmark) Bjarne Pedersen
- (Australia) Sam Masters
- (Germany) Kevin Wölbert
- (Denmark) Matias Nielsen
- (Denmark) Emil Breum
- (Denmark) Kasper Andersen
- (Australia) Jye Etheridge
- (Denmark) Esben Hjerrild
- (Poland) Kacper Gomólski
