= 2024 Danish speedway season =

Season of speedway in Denmark

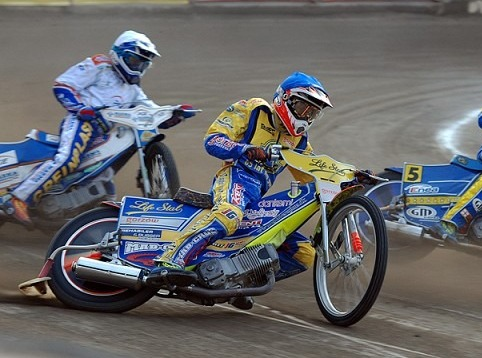
- Jepsen Jensen helped Slangerup win their first title since 2011

The 2024 Danish Speedway season is the 2024 season of motorcycle speedway in Denmark.

The same seven teams as in 2023 declared their place in the 2024 Danish Speedway League. Slangerup won the title despite finishing fourth in the regular season table.

== Individual ==
=== Danish Individual Championship ===
The 2024 Danish Individual Speedway Championship was the 2024 edition of the Danish Individual Speedway Championship. The event was held at the Billund Municipality Stadium in Grindsted on 7 August. It was won by Anders Thomsen.

Pos.	Rider	Club	Pts	Total
1	Anders Thomsen	SES	3, 1, 3, 3, 3	13+3
2	Michael Jepsen Jensen	Slangerup	3, 3, 3, 2, 3	14+2
3	Mikkel Michelsen	Slangerup	3, 2, 3, 2, 2	12+1
4	Rasmus Jensen	Holsted	3, 2, 2, 2, 3	12+0
5	Jonas Jeppesen	Esbjerg	2, 2, 1, 3, 2	10
6	Frederik Jakobsen	Fjelsted	1, 3, 3, 0, 2	9
7	Tim Sørensen	Region Varde	1, 3, 2, 1, 1	8
8	Bastian Pedersen	Holsted	2, 3, 1, 1, 1	8
9	Mads Hansen	SES	2, 1, 0, 3, 1	7
10	Matias Nielsen	Esbjerg	1, 2, 2, 2, 0	7
11	Kevin Juhl Pedersen	Holsted	2, 0, 2, 0, 1	5
12	Sam Jensen (res)	Fjelsted	-, -, 0, 1, 3	4
13	Jonas Seifert-Salk	Slangerup	1, 1, 1, 1, 0	4
14	Niels Kristian Iversen	Esbjerg	0, D, 0, 3, T	3
15	Jesper Knudsen (res)	SES	-, -, 0, D, 2	2
16	Benjamin Basso	Fjelsted	0, 1, 0, -, -	1
17	René Bach	Holsted	0, 0, W, -, -	0
18	Andreas Lyager	Slangerup	0, D, W, -, -	0

=== Grand Prix Qualifier ===
The Danish Grand Prix Qualifier was the 2024 edition of the Danish qualifier for the 2025 Speedway Grand Prix. The event took place on 16 April at Vojens Speedway Center.

Pos.	Rider	Club	Pts	Total
1	Andreas Lyager	Slangerup	3, 2, 3, 3, 2	13
2	Anders Thomsen	Vojens	3, 3, 1, 2, 3	12+3
3	Rasmus Jensen	Holsted	2, 3, 3, 3, 1	12+2
4	Benjamin Basso	Vissenbjerg	3, 3, 3, 1, 0	10
5	Frederik Jakobsen	Fjelsted	3, 3, w, 0, 3	9+3
6	Kevin Juhl Pedersen	Holsted	1, 0, 2, 3, 3	9+2
7	Jonas Seifert-Salk	Slangerup	2, 2, 2, 2, 1	9+1
8	Peter Kildemand	Fjelsted	0, 0, 2, 3, 3	8
9	Michael Jepsen Jensen	Slangerup	2, 2, 1, 0, 2	7
10	Matias Nielsen	Esbjerg	0, 1, 3, 2, 0	6
11	Mads Hansen	Vojens	1, 2, 2, 1, 0	6
12	Bastian Borke (res)	Silkeborg	2, 1, 1, 0, 1	5
13	Bastian Pedersen	Holsted	1, 0, 1, 1, 2	5
14	Tim Sørensen	Outrup	1, 1, 0, 2, 1	5
15	Nicolai Klindt	Outrup	0, 1, 0, 1, 2	4
16	Sam Fløe Jensen (res)	Vojens	0, 0, 0, 0, 0	0
17	Jesper Knudsen	Vojens	0	0
18	Niels-Kristian Iversen	Esbjerg	0	0

=== U21 Championship ===
The Danish Under 21 Individual Speedway Championship was held on 23 August at Granly Speedway Arena in Esbjerg. Bastian Pedersen won the title after a run-off.

Pos.	Rider	Points
1	Bastian Pedersen	13+3
2	Nicolai Heiselberg	13+2
3	Mikkel Andersen	13+0
4	William Drejer	11+1
5	Villads Nagel	11
6	Jesper Knudsen	10
7	Rune Thorst	9
8	Rasmus Møhlenberg Pedersen	9
9	Nicklas Aagaard	8
10	Sebastian Mayland	6
11	Thomas Kring	6
12	Patrick Kruse	4
13	Victor Rask Sundbøl	3
14	Chris Wænnerstrøm	3
15	Viktor Peter Larsen (res)	2
16	Andreas Olsen	1
17	Hjalte Nygaard (res)	0
18	Emil Elis	0

== Team ==
=== SpeedwayLigaen ===
Seven teams will compete in the SpeedwayLigaen consisting of a round robin of fixtures from 10 April to 30 August, to determine the league placings for the semi-final and super final rounds.

==== League table ====
Pos	Team	P	W	D	L	BP	Pts	Total
1	Holsted Tigers	12	9	0	3	18	3	21
2	Team Fjelsted	12	8	0	4	16	5	21
3	Grindsted	12	7	0	5	14	5	19
4	Slangerup	12	8	0	4	16	3	19
5	Esbjerg Vikings	12	4	0	8	8	3	11
6	Sønderjylland Elite Speedway	12	3	0	9	6	2	8
7	Region Varde	12	3	0	9	6	0	6

Semi-finals (teams ranked 3–6)

Pos	Team	Score	Scorers
1	Slangerup	40	Michelsen 11, Jepsen Jensen 10, Dudek 10, Nagel 8, Drejer 1
2	SES	37	Hansen 12, Thomsen 11, Andersen 7, Rew 6, Knudsen 1
3	Grindsted	29	Bjerre 10, Pollestad 7, Pawlicki 6, Thorst 3, Pedersen 3
4	Esbjerg	24	Iversen 7, Becker 6, Nielsen 6, Jeppesen 4, Aagaard 1

Super Final

Pos	Team	Score	Scorers
1	Slangerup	42	Jepsen Jensen 12, Lyager 10, Dudek 9, Holder 6, Nagel 5
2	Holsted	33	B Pedersen 15, R Jensen 14, Lahti 2, Thorssell 1, Bach 1
3	SES	32	Thomsen 16, M Hansen 7, Rew 6, M Andersen 3, J Knudsen 0
4	Fjelsted	25	Jakobsen 8, Cierniak 8, S Jensen 5, Basso 3, Kildemand 1

=== 1. Division ===
Eight teams will compete in a 4-teams matches from 20 April to 7 September, to determine the league placings for final round.

==== League table ====
Pos	Team	Pts
1	Vojens B	31
2	Holsted Tigers B	27
3	Esbjerg Vikings B	22
4	Team Fjelsted B	22
5	Slangerup Speedway B	21
6	Brovst Speedway Club	15
7	Holstebro Speedway Klub	15
8	Munkebo Scorpions	15

- Final (21/09 (Vojens) Holsted B 32 – Esbjerg B 31 – Vojens B 29 – Fjelsted B 27)

=== 2. Division ===
Six teams will compete in a 4-teams matches from 20 April to 7 September, to determine the league placings for final round.

==== League table ====
Pos	Team	Pts
1	Holstebro Speedway Klub B	20
2	Holsted Tigers C	18
3	Esbjerg Vikings C	18
4	Kronjyllands Speedway Club	8
5	Region Varde Outrup B	5
6	Brovst Speedway Club B	3

- Final (21.09 (Esbjerg) Holstebro B 38+3 – Esbjerg C 38+2 – Holsted C 32 – Kronjyllands 12)

== Squads ==
=== SpeedwayLigaen ===
Esbjerg

- (Denmark) Nicklas Aagaard
- (United States) Luke Becker
- (Denmark) Emil Breum
- (Denmark) Niels Kristian Iversen
- (Denmark) Niklas Holm Jakobsen
- (Denmark) Jonas Jeppesen
- (Denmark) Matias Nielsen

Fjelsted

- (Denmark) Benjamin Basso
- (Poland) Mateusz Cierniak
- (Denmark) Frederik Jakobsen
- (Denmark) Sam Jensen
- (Denmark) Peter Kildemand
- (Latvia) Andžejs Ļebedevs
- (Denmark) Rasmus Pedersen
- (Poland) Bartosz Smektała

Grindsted

- (Denmark) Kenneth Bjerre
- (France) David Bellego
- (Denmark) Bastian Borke
- (Poland) Robert Chmiel
- (Denmark) Patrick Hansen
- (Poland) Tobiasz Musielak
- (Poland) Przemysław Pawlicki
- (Denmark) Nicki Pedersen
- (Norway) Mathias Pollestad
- (Poland) Damian Ratajczak
- (Denmark) Rune Thorst
- (Slovenia) Matej Žagar

Holsted

- (Denmark) René Bach
- (Denmark) Lasse Bjerre
- (Denmark) Rasmus Jensen
- (Denmark) Thomas Kring
- (Sweden) / (Finland) Timo Lahti
- (Poland) Wiktor Lampart
- (Denmark) Kevin Juhl Pedersen
- (Denmark) Bastian Pedersen
- (Sweden) Jacob Thorssell

Region Varde

- (Italy) Nicolás Covatti
- (Australia) Jason Doyle
- (United Kingdom) Adam Ellis
- (Denmark) Nicolai Heiselberg
- (Denmark) Nicolai Klindt
- (Ukraine) Marko Levishyn
- (Poland) Jakub Miśkowiak
- (Denmark) Tim Sørensen
- (Poland) Kacper Woryna

SES

- (Denmark) Mikkel Andersen
- (Sweden) Oliver Berntzon
- (Denmark) Mads Hansen
- (Denmark) Jesper Knudsen
- (Denmark) Leon Madsen
- (Poland) Marcin Nowak
- (Australia) Keynan Rew
- (Denmark) Anders Thomsen

Slangerup

- (Denmark) William Drejer
- (Poland) Patryk Dudek
- (Australia) Chris Holder
- (Denmark) Michael Jepsen Jensen
- (Denmark) Andreas Lyager
- (Denmark) Mikkel Michelsen
- (Denmark) Villads Nagel
- (Denmark) Jonas Seifert-Salk

=== 1. Division ===
SES B

- (Denmark) Sam Jensen
- (Denmark) Jannik Sørensen
- (Australia) Maurice Brown
- (Norway) Glenn Moi
- (Denmark) Jesper Knudsen
- (Denmark) Rune Thorst
- (Denmark) Emil Eis
- (Denmark) Mikkel Andersen
- (Denmark) Viktor Larsen

Holsted Tigers B

- (Denmark) Kevin Juhl Pedersen
- (Denmark) Patrick Bæk
- (Norway) Glenn Moi
- (Sweden) Casper Henriksson
- (Australia) Flynn Nicol
- (Denmark) Bastian Pedersen
- (Denmark) Thomas Kring
- (Denmark) Nicklas Aagaard
- (Denmark) Håkon Lerche
- (Denmark) Hjalte Nygaard

Brovst Speedway Club

- (Denmark) Marius Nielsen
- (Denmark) Tobias Thomsen
- (Denmark) Patrick Bæk
- (Denmark) Steen Jensen
- (Norway) Glenn Moi
- (Sweden) Emil Millberg
- (Australia) Flynn Nicol
- (Sweden) Ludvig Selvin
- (Australia) Brayden McGuinness
- (Australia) Tate Zischke
- (Denmark) Esben Hjerrild
- (Denmark) Frederik Pedersen

Holstebro Speedway Klub

- (Denmark) Tim Sørensen
- (Denmark) Chris Gade
- (Denmark) Andreas Jensen
- (Denmark) Jakob Holm Birk
- (Netherlands) Mika Meijer
- (Denmark) Emil Pørtner
- (Denmark) Nicolai Heiselberg
- (Denmark) Victor Sundbøl
- (Denmark) Martin Møller Øvig
- (Denmark) Hjalte Nygaard

Team Fjelsted B

- (Denmark) Peter Kildemand
- (Denmark) Kasper Andersen
- (Denmark) Stian Nielsen
- (Denmark) Patrick Bæk
- (Denmark) Nicklas Clausen
- (Germany) Nick Colin Haltermann
- (Netherlands) Ruben Guikema
- (Denmark) Rasmus Pedersen
- (Denmark) Jacob Johansen
- (Denmark) Kris Fogtmann
- (Denmark) Michael Vedsted
- (Denmark) Kjeld Nielsen
- (Denmark) Hjalte Nygaard
- (Denmark) Viktor Larsen

Esbjerg Vikings B

- (Denmark) Tim Sørensen
- (Denmark) Jonas Jeppesen
- (Denmark) Claus Vissing
- (Denmark) Martin Møller Øvig
- (Sweden) Jonatan Grahn
- (United States) Gino Manzares
- (Netherlands) Henry van der Steen
- (Germany) Nick Colin Haltermann
- (Denmark) Emil Breum
- (Denmark) Esben Hjerrild
- (Denmark) Chris Wennerstrom
- (Denmark) Niklas Jakobsen
- (Denmark) Frederik Pedersen
- (Denmark) Viktor Larsen
- (Denmark) Andreas Olsen
- (Denmark) Hakon Lerche

Slangerup Speedway B

- (Denmark) Peter Kildemand
- (Denmark) Kenneth Hansen
- (Denmark) Nicklas Porsing
- (Denmark) Emil Breum
- (Denmark) William Drejer
- (Denmark) Bastian Borke
- (Denmark) Rune Thorst
- (Denmark) Nick Agertoft
- (Denmark) Patrick Skaarup
- (Denmark) Villads Nagel
- (Denmark) Sebastian Mayland
- (Denmark) Patrick Kruse
- (Denmark) Noah Moos
- (Denmark) Birk Olsen

Munkebo Scorpions

- (Denmark) Claus Vissing
- (Denmark) Jacob Bukhave
- (Denmark) Michael Thyme
- (Denmark) Maja Aamand
- (Norway) Lasse Frederiksen
- (Australia) Michael West
- (Denmark) Emil Breum
- (Denmark) Henrik Lorentsen
- (Denmark) Jacob Johansen
- (Denmark) Victor Sundbøl
- (Denmark) Oliver Christensen

=== 2. Division ===
Esbjerg Vikings C

- (Denmark) John Pedersen
- (Germany) Marlon Hegener
- (Netherlands) Henry van der Steen
- (Denmark) Thomas Sørensen
- (Denmark) Chris Wennerstrom
- (Denmark) Carsten Hansen
- (Denmark) Hakon Lerche
- (Denmark) Viktor Larsen
- (Denmark) Andreas Olsen
- (Denmark) Birk Olsen
- (Denmark) Victor Sundbøl

Holstebro Speedway Klub B

- (Denmark) Jakob Holm Birk
- (Denmark) Chris Gade
- (Denmark) Richard Cavazzi
- (Denmark) Tommy Fleknes
- (Denmark) Lars Andersen
- (Denmark) Victor Sundbøl
- (Denmark) Marcus Thorsen
- (Denmark) Hjalte Nygaard
- (Denmark) Martin Møller Øvig

Brovst Speedway Club B

- (Denmark) Kevin Kristensen
- (Denmark) Kasper Kristensen
- (Denmark) Jacob Brander
- (Australia) Flynn Nicol
- (Denmark) Magnus Virring
- (Denmark) Oliver Sørensen
- (Denmark) Kris Fogtmann
- (Denmark) Mads Georgsen
- (Denmark) Rasmus Larsen
- (Denmark) Tobias Pedersen

Region Varde Outrup B

- (Denmark) Simon Fischer
- (Germany) Nick Colin Haltermann
- (Netherlands) Ruben Guikema
- (Netherlands) Dennis Smit
- (Denmark) Kris Fogtmann
- (Denmark) Tristan Andersen
- (Denmark) Ole Knudtzen
- (Denmark) Tobias Pedersen

Kronjyllands Speedway Club

Holsted Tigers C
