= 2020 Danish speedway season =

Season of speedway in Denmark

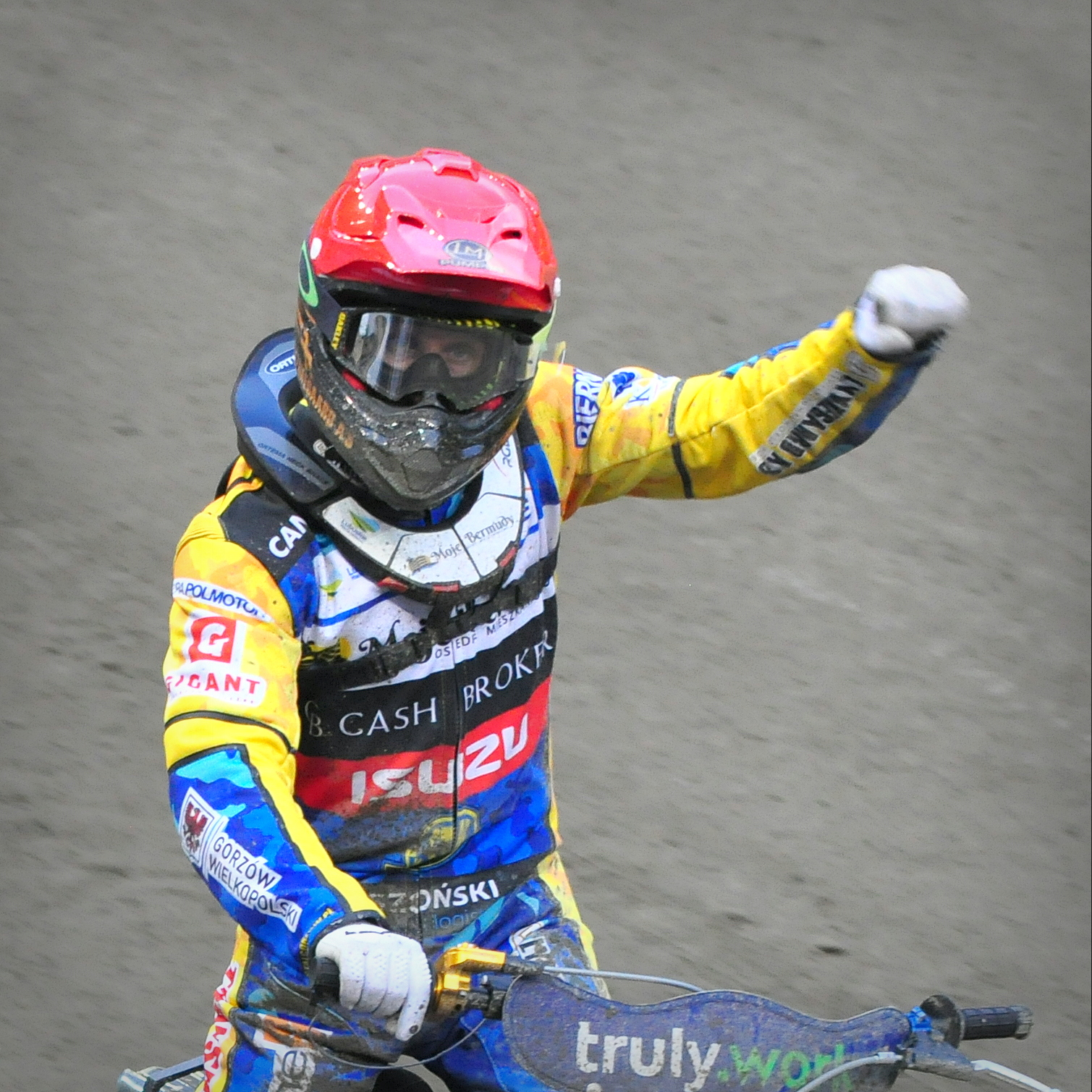
- Anders Thomsen became the Danish champion during a disrupted season.

== Individual ==
=== Individual Championship ===
The 2020 Danish Individual Speedway Championship was the 2020 edition of the Danish Individual Speedway Championship. As in 2019, the final was staged over a single round at the Vojens Speedway Center. Anders Thomsen won his first national title, beating Nicolai Klindt, Marcus Birkemose and Leon Madsen.

Each rider competed in five rides, with the four top scorers racing in an additional heat. The points from the additional heat were then added to the previous score from the five riders. The winner was the rider who accumulated the most points in all of their rides, and not the rider who won the additional heat.

Final

- 30 September 2020, held at the Vojens

Pos.	Rider	Points	Details
1	Anders Thomsen	16	(2,3,3,2,3,3)
2	Nicolai Klindt	14	(3,2,3,3,1,2)
3	Marcus Birkemose	14	(3,3,1,3,3,1)
4	Leon Madsen	12	(3,2,1,3,3,T)
5	Niels Kristian Iversen	11	(3,2,2,2,2)
6	Kenneth Bjerre	10	(2,3,0,3,2)
7	Jonas Jeppesen	9	(1,2,2,1,3)
8	René Bach	8	(2,1,1,2,2)
9	Rasmus Jensen	7	(1,3,2,0,1)
10	Andreas Lyager	6	(W,0,3,1,2)
11	Peter Kildemand	5	(2,0,3,W,-)
12	Mads Hansen	4	(0,0,2,1,1)
13	Frederik Jakobsen	3	(0,1,0,1,1)
14	Mikkel Bech	2	(0,-,0,2,0)
15	Kenneth Hansen	2	(1,1,0,0,0)
16	Lasse Bjerre	1	(-,-,1,-,0)
17	Nicki Pedersen	1	(1,W,-,-,-)
18	Matias Nielsen	0	(-,-,-,0,0)

=== U21 Championship ===
Marcus Birkemose won the U21 Championship.

Pos.	Rider	Points
1	Marcus Birkemose	17
2	Matias Nielsen	15
3	Tim Sørensen	14
4	Jonas Seifert-Salk	10
5	Emil Breum	10
6	Kevin Juhl Pedersen	10
7	Mads Hansen	10
8	Emil Pørtner	10
9	Jonas Knudsen	7
10	Bastian Borke	6
11	Nick Agertoft	4
12	Andreas Jensen	4
13	Marius Nielsen	4
14	Jannik Sorensen	2
15	Chris Gade	2
16	Sebastian Mortensen	0

== Team ==
=== Danish Speedway League ===
The entire 2020 Danish Speedway League season was cancelled due to the COVID-19 pandemic. A new team by the name of Sønderjylland Elite Speedway was created to race at the Vojens Speedway Center in 2020 and replaced the Vojens Speedway Klub.

Pos	Team
	Esbjerg Vikings
	Fjelsted
	Grindsted
	Holsted Tigers
	Region Varde
	Slangerup
	Sønderjylland
