= 2011 Danish speedway season =

Season of speedway in Denmark

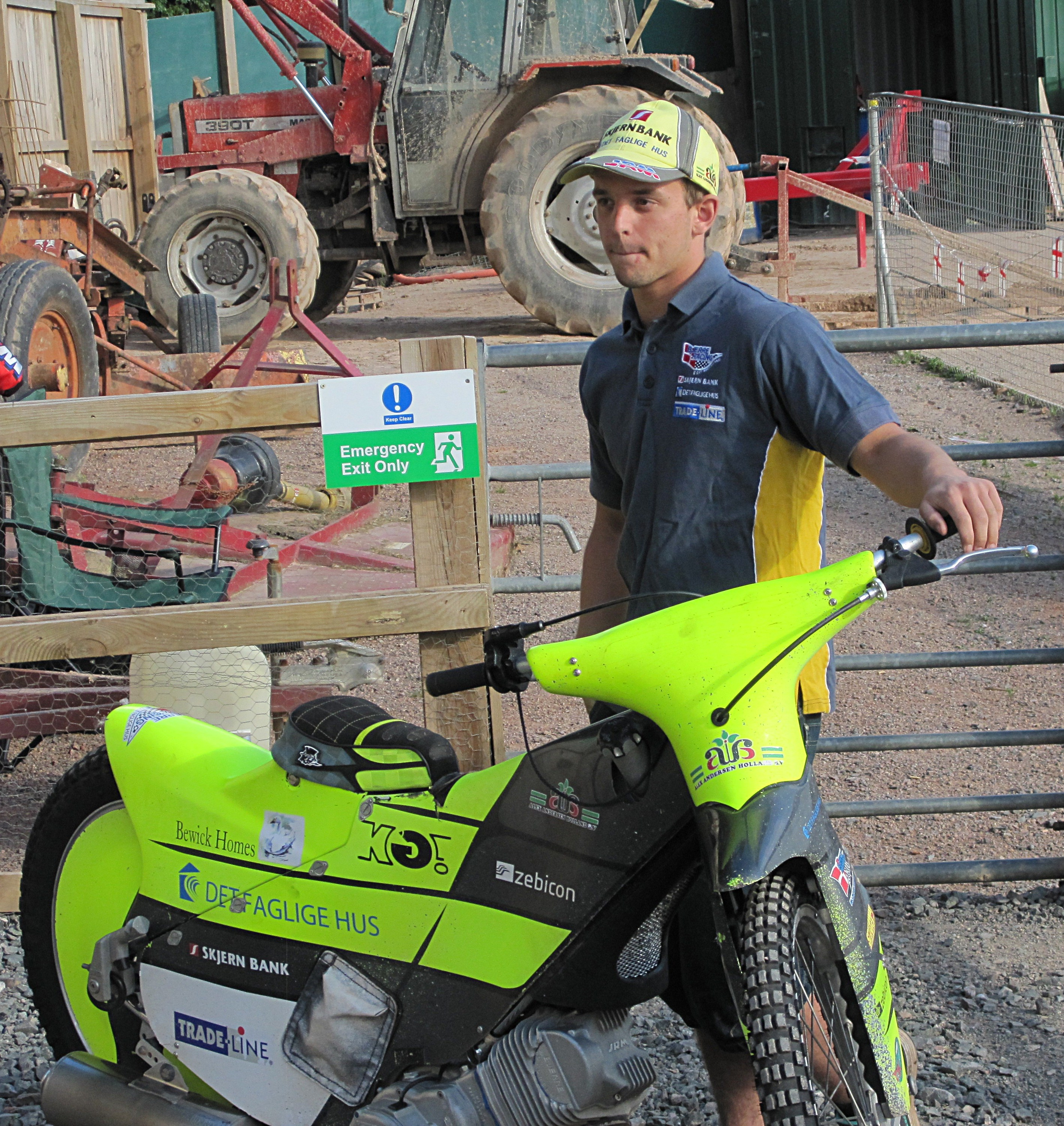
- Lasse Bjerre, 2011 Under 21 champion.

== Individual ==
=== Individual Championship ===
The 2011 Danish Individual Speedway Championship was the 2011 edition of the Danish Individual Speedway Championship. The final was staged over two rounds, at Esbjerg and Slangerup, and was won by Nicki Pedersen. It was Pedersen's seventh national title, taking him clear of Hans Nielsen in second place on the all-time list. Only Ole Olsen had won more titles.

The competition started with two quarter finals, with five progressing to the semi-final from each. The top nine then officially qualified from the semi-final, joining six seeded riders and a wild card in the final series. The final series was held over two rounds, with the top four scorers from the two rounds then competing in a Grand Final. The points from the Grand Final were then added to the total score and the overall winner was the rider with the most total points.

Quarter finals

- 23 April 2011, held at Glumsø

Pos.	Rider	Points
1	Charlie Gjedde (Esbjerg)	14
2	Jesper B. Monberg (Slangerup)	14
3	Peter Kildemand (Fjelsted)	13
4	Lasse Bjerre (Grindsted)	12
5	Michael Palm Toft (Outrup)	10
6	Nicki Barrett (Slangerup)	10
7	Kasper Lykke Nielsen (Esbjerg)	9
8	Klaus Jakobsen (Vojens)	6
9	Tommy Pedersen (Munkebo)	6
10	Marc Randrup (Vojens)	5
11	Denis Spicker Thostesen (Outrup)	5
12	Nikolaj Busk Jakobsen (Holstebro)	4
13	Jannik Jeppesen Leerberg (Glumsø)	3
14	Dennis Pedersen (Glumsø)	3
15	Kenneth Dryvig Jensen (Outrup)	3
16	Patrick Bjerregaard (Holsted)	2

- 23 April 2011, held at Holstebro

Pos.	Rider	Points
1	Mikkel Bech Jensen (Vojens)	14
2	Patrick Nørgaard (Holstebro)	13
3	Jonas Andersen (Holstebro)	11
4	Morten Risager (Holsted)	11
5	Kenneth Hansen (Slangerup)	10
6	Krister Jacobsen	9
7	Mikkel Michelsen (Slangerup)	9
8	Emil Meyer	8
9	Simon Nielsen	8
10	Jesper Kristiansen	7
11	Mads Skov (Grindsted)	5
12	Niels Nielsen	3
13	Mikkel Salomonsen	3
14	Nicklas Porsing (Holsted)	3
15	Peter Karger	2
16	Henrik Møller (Holsted)	2
17	Jacob Bukhave	0

Semi-final

- 7 May 2011, held at Randers

Pos.	Rider	Points
1	Niels Kristian Iversen (Outrup)	13
2	Ulrich Østergaard (Grindsted)	12
3	Kenneth Hansen (Slangerup)	10
4	Jonas Andersen (Holstebro)	10
5	Nicki Barrett (Slangerup)	9
6	Jesper B. Monberg (Slangerup)	9
7	Nicolai Klindt (Holsted)	8
8	Patrick Hougaard (Holsted)	8
9	Peter Kildemand (Fjelsted)	8
10	Michael Jepsen Jensen (Vojens)	7
11	Charlie Gjedde (Esbjerg)	7
12	Patrick Nørgaard (Holstebro)	7
13	Michael Palm Toft (Outrup)	6
14	Mikkel Bech Jensen (Vojens)	3
15	Lasse Bjerre (Grindsted)	2
16	Krister Jacobsen	1

Final series

Round one

- 3 June 2011, held at Slangerup

Pos.	Rider	Points	Details
1	Nicki Pedersen (Holsted)	14	(2,3,3,3,3)
2	Jesper B. Monberg (Slangerup)	13	(3,3,1,3,3)
3	Peter Kildemand (Fjelsted)	12	(3,3,2,2,2)
4	Bjarne Pedersen (Holstebro)	11	(3,2,1,2,3)
5	Kenneth Hansen (Slangerup)	11	(2,2,3,2,2)
6	Leon Madsen (Esbjerg)	10	(2,3,2,3,X)
7	Nicolai Klindt (Holsted)	9	(2,1,2,1,3)
8	Niels Kristian Iversen (Outrup)	8	(3,0,3,1,1)
9	Ulrich Østergaard (Grindsted)	8	(1,0,3,3,1)
10	Kenni Larsen (Outrup)	5	(1,2,2,0,0)
11	Michael Jepsen Jensen (Vojens)	4	(0,1,1,0,2)
12	Nicki Barrett (Slangerup)	4	(1,1,1,1,0)
13	Kenneth Bjerre (Grindsted)	3	(E,0,0,1,2)
14	Mads Korneliussen (Outrup)	2	(0,2,F,-,-,)
15	Mikkel Bech Jensen (Vojens)	2	(-,-,-,2,-)
16	Jonas Andersen (Holstebro)	2	(1,0,0,0,1)
17	Charlie Gjedde (Esbjerg)	1	(0,1,0,0,E)
18	Michael Palm Toft (Outrup)	1	(-,-,0,-,1)

Round two

- 5 August 2011, held at Esbjerg

Pos.	Rider	Points	Details
1	Niels Kristian Iversen (Outrup)	14	(2,0,3,3,3,3)
2	Nicki Pedersen (Holsted)	14	(3,2,2,3,2,2)
3	Kenneth Bjerre (Grindsted)	14	(3,3,3,2,3)
4	Mads Korneliussen (Outrup)	11	(2,2,3,3,1)
5	Leon Madsen (Esbjerg)	10	(1,3,2,3,1,0)
6	Nicolai Klindt (Holsted)	10	(3,1,3,1,2)
7	Patrick Hougaard (Holsted)	10	(3,2,1,2,2)
8	Jesper B. Monberg (Slangerup)	9	(1,1,2,1,3,1)
9	Bjarne Pedersen (Holstebro)	6	(1,E,0,2,3)
10	Michael Jepsen Jensen (Vojens)	6	(2,3,1,E,0)
11	Kenneth Hansen (Slangerup)	5	(1,3,1,0,0)
12	Kenni Larsen (Outrup)	5	(2,1,0,1,1)
13	Ulrich Østergaard (Grindsted)	4	(E,M,X,2,2)
14	Jonas Andersen (Holstebro)	3	(0,X,2,0,1)
15	Nicki Barrett (Slangerup)	2	(0,2,0,0,0)
16	Peter Kildemand (Fjelsted)	2	(0,1,-,-,-)
17	Charlie Gjedde (Esbjerg)	1	(-,-,1,-,0)
18	Tommy Pedersen (Fjelsted)	1	(-,-,-,1,-)

Final classification

Pos.	Rider	Points	(Denmark)	(Denmark)
1	Nicki Pedersen (Holsted)	28	14	14
2	Niels Kristian Iversen (Outrup)	22	8	14
3	Jesper B. Monberg (Slangerup)	22	13	9
4	Leon Madsen (Esbjerg)	20	10	10
5	Nicolai Klindt (Holsted)	18	9	9
6	Kenneth Bjerre (Grindsted)	17	3	14
7	Bjarne Pedersen (Holstebro)	17	11	6
8	Peter Kildemand (Fjelsted)	16	12	4
9	Kenneth Hansen (Slangerup)	16	11	5
10	Mads Korneliussen (Outrup)	13	2	11
11	Ulrich Østergaard (Grindsted)	12	8	4
12	Patrick Hougaard (Holsted)	10	–	10
13	Michael Jepsen Jensen (Vojens)	10	4	6
14	Kenni Larsen (Outrup)	10	5	5
15	Nicki Barrett (Slangerup)	6	4	2
16	Jonas Andersen (Holstebro)	5	2	3
17	Mikkel Bech Jensen (Vojens)	2	2	–
18	Charlie Gjedde (Esbjerg)	2	1	1
19	Michael Palm Toft (Outrup)	1	1	–
-	Tommy Pedersen (Fjelsted)	1	–	1

=== U21 Championship ===
Lasse Bjerre won the U21 Championship at Grindsted on 11 September.

Pos.	Rider	Points
1	Lasse Bjerre	15+3
2	Mikkel Michelsen	13+2
3	Nikolaj Busk Jakobsen	12+1
4	Marc Randrup	12+0
5	Rasmus Jensen	11
6	Mikkel B. Jensen	9
7	Kenni Nissen	9
8	Simon Nielsen	8
9	Kasper Lykke Nielsen	6
10	Johannes Kikkenborg	5
11	Jacob Bukhave	4
12	Jonas B. Andersen	4
13	Emil Grøndal	3
14	Eskild Kruse	3
15	Nicklas Porsing	2
16	Nikolaj Soderholm	2
17	Anders Vad	1

== Team ==
=== Danish Speedway League ===
The Danish Speedway League was won by Slangerup for the fourth time. Brovst had dropped out and would not compete for another 11 years in the league.

Pos	Team	P	W	D	L	Pts	BP	Total
1	Slangerup	14	11	0	3	22	5	27
2	Holstebro	14	9	1	4	19	6	25
3	Holsted Tigers	14	8	2	4	18	5	20+
4	Outrup	14	7	2	5	16	3	19
5	Esbjerg Vikings	14	5	0	9	10	3	13
6	Vojens	14	5	0	9	10	3	13
7	Fjelsted	14	4	0	10	8	2	10
8	Grindsted	14	4	1	9	9	1	10

+Holsted deducted 3 points for fielding an understrength team at Grindsted

== Teams ==
Slangerup

- (United States) Greg Hancock
- (Denmark) Jesper B. Monberg
- (Denmark) Kenneth Kruse Hansen
- (Denmark) René Bach
- (Denmark) Mikkel Michelsen
- (Poland) Mirosław Jabłoński
- (Denmark) Nicki Barrett

Holstebro

- (Denmark) Bjarne Pedersen
- (Ukraine) Aleksandr Loktaev
- (Poland) Tomasz Gapiński
- (Ukraine) Andriy Kobrin
- (Denmark) Patrick Nørgaard
- (Denmark) Jonas B. Andersen
- (Denmark) Nikolaj Busk Jakobsen
- (Ukraine) Andriej Karpov
- (Denmark) Jan Graversen

Holsted

- (Denmark) Nicki Pedersen
- (Denmark) Nicolai Klindt
- (Denmark) Patrick Hougaard
- (Denmark) Nicklas Porsing
- (Denmark) Morten Risager
- (Denmark) Christian Ago
- (Denmark) Henrik Møller
- (Denmark) Patrick Bjerregaard
- (Germany) Kevin Wölbert
- (Slovakia) Martin Vaculik
- (Australia) Troy Batchelor
- (Poland) Krzysztof Buczkowski

Outrup

- (Denmark) Niels Kristian Iversen
- (Denmark) Mads Korneliussen
- (Denmark) Kenni Larsen
- (Sweden) Antonio Lindbäck
- (Denmark) Michael Palm Toft
- (Poland) Grzegorz Walasek
- (Poland) Artur Mroczka
- (Denmark) Claes Nedermark
- (Denmark) Marc Randrup
- (Poland) Tomasz Chrzanowski

Esbjerg

- (Sweden) Andreas Jonsson
- (Poland) Sebastian Ułamek
- (Denmark) Leon Madsen
- (Denmark) Steen Jensen
- (Denmark) Charlie Gjedde
- (Denmark) Kasper Lykke Nielsen
- (Poland) Piotr Protasiewicz
- (Poland) Adrian Miedziński
- (Finland) Joonas Kylmäkorpi
- (Poland) Zbigniew Suchecki
- (Denmark) Peter Juul Larsen

Vojens

- (Denmark) Hans Andersen
- (Denmark) Michael Jepsen Jensen
- (Denmark) Mikkel Bech
- (Denmark) Thomas Jørgensen
- (Denmark) Klaus Jakobsen
- (Poland) Mariusz Puszakowski
- (Denmark) Kenni Nissen

Fjelsted

- (Denmark) Peter Kildemand
- (Sweden) Magnus Zetterström
- (Sweden) Linus Sundström
- (Denmark) Dannie Soderholm
- (Sweden) Linus Eklöf
- (Sweden) Oliver Berntzon
- (Denmark) Tommy Pedersen
- (Denmark) Simon Nielsen
- (Poland) Tomasz Jędrzejak
- (Czech Republic) Matěj Kůs

Grindsted

- (Denmark) Kenneth Bjerre
- (Denmark) Lasse Bjerre
- (Denmark) Ulrich Østergaard
- (Denmark) Henning Bager
- (Denmark) Claus Vissing
- (Denmark) Mads E. Skov
- (Sweden) Mathias Thörnblom
- (Denmark) Jesper Kristiansen
- (Denmark) Jesper Søgaard-Kristiansen
- (Poland) Daniel Pytel
