= 1982 Danish speedway season =

Season of speedway in Denmark

The 1982 Danish speedway season was the 1982 season of motorcycle speedway in Denmark.

== Individual ==
=== Danish Final (world championship round) ===
Six riders from the Danish final would progress to the Nordic Final as part of the 1982 Individual Speedway World Championship. The final was held on 11 May at Fredericia, and was won by Erik Gundersen.

Final

Pos.	Rider	Total
1	Erik Gundersen	13+3
2	Bo Petersen	13+2
3	Hans Nielsen	13+1
4	Ole Olsen	11
5	Preben Eriksen	10
6	Tommy Knudsen	10
7	Finn Thomsen	9
8	Bent Rasmussen	8
9	Jens Rasmussen	7
10	Alf Busk	7
11	Finn Rune Jensen	5
12	Helge R. Hansen	4
13	Jens Henry Nielsen	4
14	John Eskildsen	3
15	Hans Albert Klinge	3
16	Rene Christiansen	0

=== Individual Championship ===
The 1982 Danish Individual Speedway Championship was the 1982 edition of the Danish Individual Speedway Championship. The final was held at Randers on 12 September. The title was won by Hans Nielsen for the second time.

Final

Pos.	Rider	Total
1	Hans Nielsen	14
2	Erik Gundersen	13
3	Bo Petersen	11+3
4	Tommy Knudsen	11+2
5	Preben Eriksen	11+1
6	Peter Ravn	10
7	Finn Rune Jensen	10
8	Ole Olsen	9
9	Hans O. Christensen	7
10	John Eskildsen	6
11	Brian Jacobsen	5
12	Flemming Pedersen	5
13	Kent Noer	3
14	Finn Thomsen	2
15	Jens Rasmussen	1

Key - Each heat has four riders, 3 points for a heat win, 2 for 2nd, 1 for third and 0 for last

=== Junior Championship ===
Erik Holm won the Junior Championship.

== Team ==
=== Danish Tournament ===
The 1982 Danish Tournament was won by Leoparderne Fjelsted (the Leopards), who became Danish champions for the first time in their history.

Division 1 league table

Pos	Team	P	Pts
1	Leoparderne Fjelsted	10	29
2	Vikingerne Esbjerg	10	28
3	Blabjergdrengene Outrup	10	22
4	Hanerne Hanherred	10	21
5	Tigers Holsted	10	22
6	Faestningsdrengene	10	20
7	Goodyear-drengene Vojens	10	17
8	Kulsvierne Frederiksborg	10	16
9	Rodspaetterne Frederikshavn	10	15
10	Cometerne Fjelsted	10	12
11	Uldjyderne Herning	10	12
12	Skansedrengene Fredericia	10	8
13	Ulvene Midtsjaellands	10	8
14	Falkene Silkeborg	10	5
15	Drabanterne Frederiksborg	10	4
16	Laksene Randers	10	1

Division 2 league table

Pos	Team	P	Pts
1	Raketterne Fjelsted	10	28
2	Panthers Holsted	10	26
3	Klitrengene Esbjerg	10	23
4	Cimbrerne Aalborg	10	18
5	Wildcats Holsted	10	18
6	Vestjyderne Outrup	10	17
7	Hajerne Frederikshavn	10	15
8	Fighters Vojens	10	15
9	Svanerne Munkebo	10	13
10	Pythonerne Århus	10	13
11	Skovtroldene Frederiksborg	10	10
12	Ulveungerne Midtsjaellands	10	10
13	Urhanerne Herning	10	10
14	Magerne Bogense	10	9
15	Ravnene Hanherred	10	8
16	Fladbrodrdrengene Randers	10	7

Division 3 league table

Pos	Team	P	Pts
1	Volddrengene Fredericia	8	23
2	Stjernerne Fjelsted	8	16
3	Satelitterne Fjelsted	8	14
4	Fynborne Odin Odense	8	4
5	Jetterne Amager	8	3
