= Danish Under 21 Individual Speedway Championship =

Danish speedway competition

Danish Individual Speedway Championship
- Sport: Motorcycle speedway
- Founded: 1960

The Danish Under 21 Individual Speedway Championship (formerly the Junior Championship) is a competition for riders who are under the age of 21, holding a Danish passport and a valid DMU licence.

== History ==
The competition was first staged in 1960 as a Junior Championship and was won by Jorgen Hoffman. From 1960 until 1979 it was only open to riders who had not obtained enough points to become senior riders. From 2002, the format changed to Under 21 for the first time.

Kenneth Bjerre holds the record for most titles with four.

== Previous winners ==
Year	Venue	Winners	Runner-up	3rd place
Junior Speedway Championship
1960	Hillerød	Jørgen Hoffman		
1962	Hillerød	Eigil Vergmann	Erik Jensen	Arne Andraesen
1963	Hillerød	Prben Andraesen	Svend Johansen	Ove Petersen
1964	Hillerød	Børge Fynbo	Jan Holm Nielsen	Henning Larsen
1965	Hillerød	Ole Olsen	Kurt Bøgh	Frank Larsen
1966	Hillerød	Hans Walter Johansen	Per Ehlert	Frank Larsen
1967	Hillerød	Bent Nørregaard-Jensen	John Hansen	Preben Pedersen
1968	Hillerød	Preben Rosenkilde	Bjarne Nygaard	Henning E. Hansen
1969	Hillerød	Bent Juul Larsen	Flemming Larsen	Frank Jahn
1970	Hillerød	Niels Hansen	Uffe Sorensen	Gert Nielsen
1971	Hillerød	Ervin Hansen	Jens Erik Krause Kjaer	Kurt Schelde
1972	Hillerød	Ole Hermansen	Leif Berlin	Kristian Praestbro
1973	Hillerød	Finn Thomsen	Gunnar Svendsen	Jørgen Walter
1974	Hillerød	Mike Lohmann	John Rosenkrantz	Svend A. Gormsen
1975	Skovby	Finn Jensen	Knud Ellegard	Niels E. Pedersen
1976	Hillerød	Hans Nielsen	Bo Petersen	Frank Mastrup
1977	Vojens	Erik Gundersen	Steen Mastrup	Arne Kruse
1978	Fredericia	Tommy Knudsen	Finn Lundahl	Preben Eriksen
1979	Vojens	Hans Albert Klinge	Lars Vinding	Gunnar Hansen
1980	Randers	John Eskildsen	Brian Jakobsen	Ulf Schack
1981	Hillerød	Sam Nikolajsen	Jens Rasmussen	Jan O. Pedersen
1982	Hillerød	Erik Holm	Frank Andersen	John Jørgensen
1983	Fredericia	Aksel Jepsen	Knud E. Knudsen	Henrik Ziegler
1984	Outrup	Jan Jakobsen	Allan Johansen	Jan Jespersen
1985	Fjelsted	Ole Hansen	Brian Karger	Lars Munkedal
1986	Slangerup	Gert Handberg	Hans Henrik Hansen	Jess Frederiksen
1987	Ornedal	Kenneth Arnfred	Bjarne Jakobsen	Mogens Hansen
1988	Outrup	Jan Mikkelsen	Bo Sørensen	Bo Johnsen
1989	Holstebro	Johnny Jørgensen	Brian Andersen	Jacob Olsen
1990	Frederikslyst	Bo Skov Eriksen	Peter Larsen	Michael Dahl
1991	Holsted	Kim Brandt	René Madsen	Morten Andersen
1992	Vojens	Ronni Pedersen	Thomas Ravn	Allan Damgaard
1993	Herning	Carsten Hansen	Flemming Rasmussen	Bent Rasmussen II
1994	Esbjerg	Klaus Rasmussen	Jesper B. Monberg	Anders Nielsen
1995	Holsted	Charlie Gjedde	Nicki Pedersen	Jesper Steentoft
1996	Glumsø	Hans N. Andersen	Hans Knut	Thomas B. Jensen
1997	Vojens	Claus Kristensen	Carsten Lauritsen	Jack Gunderstrup
1998	Munkebo	Ronnie Henningsen	Thomas Poulsen	Henning Bager
1999	Munkebo	Mads Korneliussen	Kenneth Sørensen	Niels Kristian Iversen
2000	Glumsø	Kenneth Bjerre	Kristian Lund	Hans O. Jensen
2001	Holsted	Sabrina Bogh	Mads B. Pedersen	Ulrich Østergaard
Under 21 Speedway Championship
2002	Outrup	Niels Kristian Iversen	Kenneth Bjerre	Henning Bager
2003	Kronjylland	Kenneth Bjerre	Niels Kristian Iversen	Rune Knudsen
2004	Brovst	Kenneth Bjerre	Mads Korneliussen	Morten Risager
2005	Holsted	Kenneth Bjerre	Morten Risager	Patrick Norgaard
2006	Holstebro	Nicolai Klindt	Patrick Hougaard	Klaus Jakobsen
2007	Munkebo	Patrick Hougaard	Morten Risager	Kenneth Hansen
2008	Fjelsted	Nicolai Klindt	Patrick Hougaard	René Bach
2009	Glumsø	Patrick Hougaard	Nicolai Klindt	Kenni Larsen
2010	Slangerup	René Bach	Michael Jepsen Jensen	Patrick Hougaard
2011	Grindsted	Lasse Bjerre	Mikkel Michelsen	Nikolaj Busk Jakobsen
2012	Vojens	Michael Jepsen Jensen	Nicklas Porsing	Mikkel Michelsen
2013	Randers	Mikkel Michelsen	Lasse Bjerre	Michael Jepsen Jensen
2014	Silkeborg	Mikkel Bech Jensen	Emil Grondal	Kasper Lykke Nielsen
2015	Brovst	Mikkel Michelsen	Mikkel Bech Jensen	Anders Thomsen
2016	Holstebro	Jonas Jeppesen	Andreas Lyager	Mikkel B. Andersen
2017	Holsted	Sam Jensen	Andreas Lyager	Jonas Jeppesen
2018	Outrup	Andreas Lyager	Jonas Jeppesen	Frederik Jakobsen
2019	Esbjerg	Jonas Jeppesen	Matias Nielsen	Marcus Birkemose
2020	Outrup	Marcus Birkemose	Matias Nielsen	Jonas Seifert-Salk
2021	Outrup	Tim Sørensen	Emil Portner	Benjamin Basso
2022	Grindsted	Benjamin Basso	Kevin Juhl Pedersen	Emil Breum
2023	Holsted	Emil Breum	Esben Hjerrild	William Drejer
2024	Esbjerg	Bastian Pedersen	Nicolai Heiselberg	Mikkel Andersen
2025	Slangerup	Mikkel Andersen	William Drejer	Nicolai Heiselberg

== See also ==
- Danish Speedway League
- Danish Individual Speedway Championship
