= 2015 Premier League speedway season =

British motorcycle speedway season

- Champions: Edinburgh Monarchs
- Knockout Cup: Somerset Rebels
- Premier League Cup: Edinburgh Monarchs
- Individual: Ulrich Østergaard
- Pairs: Ipswich Witches
- Fours: Edinburgh Monarchs
- Highest average: Simon Stead
- Division/s above: 2015 Elite League
- Division/s below: 2015 National League

The 2015 Premier League season was the second division of British speedway.

== Summary ==
took place between March and October 2015. The Edinburgh Monarchs were the defending champions after winning the championship in 2014. The 13 teams that competed remained unchanged from the teams who competed in 2014. There had been concerns about whether or not the Peterborough Panthers would be able to compete but their future was secured after being able to raise the money necessary to continue racing.

In an all-Scottish final, the Edinburgh Monarchs became the first team to win consecutive Premier League titles, by beating the Glasgow Tigers in the Grand Final. The Tigers held a 7-point lead after the first leg at Ashfield, but the Monarchs won 14 of the 15 heats in the second leg at Armadale – winning 58–32 on the night – to win the tie overall 99–80. It was one of three titles won by the Monarchs in 2015; in the Premier League Cup, the Monarchs beat the Tigers once again 100–79, while the quartet of Craig Cook, Sam Masters, Erik Riss and Justin Sedgmen won the Premier League Fours.

Aside from Edinburgh's successes, the Somerset Rebels defeated the Monarchs to win the Knockout Cup, Daniel King and Rohan Tungate won the Premier League Pairs for the Ipswich Witches, and Danish rider Ulrich Østergaard won the Premier League Riders' Championship for the Peterborough Panthers.

== Final league table ==
Pos.	Club	M	Home			Away					F	A	+/−	Pts
Pos.	Club	M	W	D	L	4W	3W	D	1L	L	F	A	+/−	Pts
1	Edinburgh Monarchs (Q)	24	10	0	2	6	1	1	2	2	1229	955	+274	61
2	Somerset Rebels (Q)	24	10	0	2	3	3	1	2	3	1188	998	+190	55
3	Glasgow Tigers (Q)	24	10	0	2	2	4	0	4	2	1122	999	+123	54
4	Peterborough Panthers (Q)	24	8	0	4	4	2	1	3	2	1104	1039	+65	51
5	Sheffield Tigers (Q)	24	10	1	1	2	3	0	1	6	1112	1062	+50	49
6	Plymouth Devils (Q)	24	10	0	2	2	1	1	0	8	1123	1074	+49	43
7	Ipswich Witches	24	7	2	3	0	5	0	4	3	1163	1023	+140	42
8	Workington Comets	24	12	0	0	0	0	1	0	11	1086	1116	−30	38
9	Newcastle Diamonds	24	8	0	4	0	1	0	0	11	1067	1129	−62	27
10	Berwick Bandits	24	6	1	5	1	0	0	1	10	1011	1173	−162	24
11	Scunthorpe Scorpions	24	7	0	5	0	0	1	1	10	999	1185	−186	24
12	Rye House Rockets	24	5	1	6	1	0	0	1	10	998	1166	−168	21
13	Redcar Bears	24	6	1	5	0	0	0	0	12	946	1229	−283	19

== Fixtures & results ==
Home \ Away	BER	ED	GLA	IPS	NEW	PET	PLY	RED	RYE	SCU	SHE	SOM	WOR
Berwick Bandits		38–54	57–35	42–48	55–37	41–49	45–45	52–38	64–29	46–44	41–42	37–56	50–43
Edinburgh Monarchs	61–32		42–48	53–37	52–40	44–45	64–28	65–28	59–34	53–39	60–31	55–35	56–36
Glasgow Tigers	58–34	39–51		47–45	52–41	31–29	52–41	62–28	42–20	57–33	53–40	42–47	53–36
Ipswich Witches	60–30	45–45	43–47		43–49	61–29	56–35	65–25	58–35	59–33	44–49	45–45	58–35
Newcastle Diamonds	53–37	42–48	46–43	48–43		44–46	56–36	61–31	52–40	60–33	41–48	42–48	53–39
Peterborough Panthers	51–39	41–49	48–45	44–46	51–41		43–47	51–41	55–37	54–36	53–37	39–53	56–36
Plymouth Devils	57–35	48–42	42–47	54–39	65–27	40–52		52–41	54–38	62–30	46–44	57–36	50–40
Redcar Bears	39–51	47–43	42–51	44–46	50–43	32–49	50–42		47–43	49–41	43–47	48–45	45–45
Rye House Rockets	52–40	40–52	39–51	44–46	55–38	41–52	38–53	58–32		45–45	37–50	50–42	51–42
Scunthorpe Scorpions	49–44	40–50	42–47	43–47	54–38	47–43	53–40	51–39	36–54		49–41	33–57	54–38
Sheffield Tigers	56–36	51–39	48–42	50–43	59–33	45–45	56–37	50–40	55–37	53–40		43–47	55–37
Somerset Rebels	58–32	42–51	58–32	48–42	51–39	57–35	38–52	55–38	51–39	52–38	63–29		59–34
Workington Comets	59–33	49–41	47–46	49–44	50–43	49–44	52–40	61–29	50–42	57–36	56–33	46–45	

Legend: Blue = home team win; Yellow = draw; Red = away team win.

== Play-offs ==
Quarter-finals
3	Glasgow Tigers	44	56	100
6	Plymouth Devils	46	34	80
4	Peterborough Panthers	46	51	97
5	Sheffield Tigers	44	38	82

Semi-finals
2	Somerset Rebels	48	41	89
3	Glasgow Tigers	42	49	91
1	Edinburgh Monarchs	44	58	102
4	Peterborough Panthers	46	32	78

Grand Final
3	Glasgow Tigers	48	32	80
1	Edinburgh Monarchs	41	58	99

Quarter-finals

17 September 2015	Report	Sheffield Tigers	44–46	Peterborough Panthers	Owlerton Stadium; Referee(s): Darren Hartley

27 September 2015	Report	Peterborough Panthers	51–38	Sheffield Tigers	East of England Showground; Referee(s): Dale Entwistle

2 October 2015	Report	Plymouth Devils	46–44	Glasgow Tigers	St Boniface Arena; Referee(s): Stuart Wilson

4 October 2015	Report	Glasgow Tigers	56–34	Plymouth Devils	Ashfield Stadium; Referee(s): Phil Griffin

Semi-finals

4 October 2015	Report	Peterborough Panthers	46–44	Edinburgh Monarchs	East of England Showground; Referee(s): Peter Clarke

9 October 2015	Report	Edinburgh Monarchs	58–32	Peterborough Panthers	Armadale Stadium; Referee(s): Willie Dishington

9 October 2015	Report	Somerset Rebels	48–42	Glasgow Tigers	Oaktree Arena; Referee(s): David Watters

11 October 2015	Report	Glasgow Tigers	49–41	Somerset Rebels	Ashfield Stadium; Referee(s): Michael Breckon

=== Grand final ===
First leg

16 October 2015	Report	Glasgow Tigers; Richard Lawson 13; James Sarjeant 12; Nick Morris 9 Victor Palovaara 7 Hynek Štichauer 4 Aaron Summers 3 Kauko Nieminen R/R	48–41	Edinburgh Monarchs; Craig Cook 11; Kevin Wölbert 10; Justin Sedgman 7 Erik Riss 5 Sam Masters 5 Max Clegg 3 Robert Braniford 0	Ashfield Stadium; Referee(s): Chris Gay

Second leg

17 October 2015	Report	Edinburgh Monarchs; Kevin Wölbert 13; Sam Masters 12; Craig Cook 9 Justin Sedgman 9 Max Clegg 8 Erik Riss 6 Liam Carr 1	58–32	Glasgow Tigers; Richard Lawson 10; Nick Morris 9 James Sarjeant 5 Hynek Štichauer 5 Victor Palovaara 2 Theo Pijper 1 Aaron Summers R/R	Armadale Stadium; Referee(s): Dave Robinson

== Premier League Knockout Cup ==
The 2015 Premier League Knockout Cup was the 48th edition of the Knockout Cup for tier two teams. Somerset Rebels were the winners of the competition.

First round

Date	Team one	Score	Team two
28/06	Newcastle	63-26	Scunthorpe
05/06	Scunthorpe	53-37	Newcastle
18/06	Plymouth	47-41	Peterborough
25/05	Peterborough	46-44	Plymouth
22/05	Edinburgh	59-31	Sheffield
21/05	Sheffield	46-44	Edinburgh
17/05	Rye House	60-30	Workington
16/05	Workington	51-39	Rye House
21/05	Ipswich	46-44	Berwick
09/05	Berwick	47-43	Ipswich

Quarter-finals

Date	Team one	Score	Team two
30/08	Newcastle	56-33	Glasgow
30/08	Glasgow	48-42	Newcastle
01/08	Edinburgh	61-29	Redcar
23/07	Redcar	37-35	Edinburgh
25/07	Berwick	40-50	Rye House
12/07	Rye House	42-48	Berwick
11/07	Plymouth	40-50	Somerset
10/07	Somerset	53-37	Plymouth

Semi-finals

Date	Team one	Score	Team two
12/09	Rye House	43-47	Somerset
11/09	Somerset	60-30	Rye House
13/09	Newcastle	53-37	Edinburgh
04/09	Edinburgh	56-34	Newcastle

=== Final ===
First leg

29 September 2015

Somerset Rebels Richie Worrall 10 Paul Starke 10 Brady Kurtz 9 Josh Grajczonek 9 Rasmus Jensen 6 Charles Wright 3 Hynek Štichauer 2	49 – 41	Edinburgh Monarchs Craig Cook 15 Erik Riss 9 Sam Masters 8 Justin Sedgman 6 Robert Braniford 2 Ben Morley 1 Kevin Wölbert R/R

Oaktree Arena

Second leg

2 October 2015

Edinburgh Monarchs Craig Cook 13 Sam Masters 11 Justin Sedgman 11 Robert Braniford 5 Erik Riss 4 Max Clegg 3 Kevin Wölbert R/R	47 – 43	Somerset Rebels Paul Starke 10 Rasmus Jensen 9 Richie Worrall 9 Josh Grajczonek 7 Charles Wright 6 Brady Kurtz 2 Luke Chessell (guest) 0

Armadale Stadium

Edinburgh were declared Knockout Cup Champions, winning on aggregate 92–88.

== Riders' Championship ==
Ulrich Østergaard won the Riders' Championship. The final was held on 6 September at Owlerton Stadium.

Pos.	Rider	Pts	Total	SF	Final
1	(Denmark) Ulrich Østergaard	3 3 2 1 3	12	-	3
2	(United States) Ricky Wells	3 2 1 3 0	9	2	2
3	(England) Craig Cook	1 2 3 3 3	12	-	1
4	(Australia) Josh Grajczonek	2 2 3 3 0	10	3	0
5	(Denmark) Jonas B. Andersen	2 0 3 2 2	9	1	
6	(England) Edward Kennett	3 2 1 2 3	11	0	
7	(Australia) Sam Masters	2 3 2 ef 1	8		
8	(Australia) Brady Kurtz	3 3 0 2 fx	8		
9	(England) Jason Garrity	1 1 3 2 1	8		
10	(Australia) Nick Morris	1 1 0 3 2	7		
11	(England) Steve Worrall	0 1 1 1 3	6		
12	(Australia) Rohan Tungate	2 0 2 0 1	5		
13	(England) Richard Lawson	0 0 2 1 1	4		
14	(England) Alex Davies	r 1 1 0 2	4		
15	(England) Kyle Newman	1 0 ef 1 2	4		
16	(Denmark) Thomas Jørgensen	0 3 0	3		
17	(England) Layne Cupitt (res)	0	0		
18	(England) Rob Shuttleworth (res)	0	0		

- f=fell, r-retired, ex=excluded, ef=engine failure t=touched tapes

== Pairs ==
The Premier League Pairs Championship was held at Oaktree Arena on 3 July. The event was won by Ipswich Witches.

Group A
Pos	Team	Pts	Riders
1	Ipswich	24	King 15, Tungate 9
2	Peterborough	23	Ostergaard 13, Palm Toft 10
3	Edinburgh	16	Masters 14, Wolbert 2
4	Newcastle	14	Kerr 9, Worrall S 5
5	Rye House	13	Kennett 7 Jakobsen 6

Group B
Pos	Team	Pts	Riders
1	Somerset	22	Kurtz 14, Grajczonek 8
2	Redcar	18	Bjerre 11, Robson 7
3	Berwick	18	Doolan 10, Jorgensen 6
4	Glasgow	18	Morris 15, Lawson 3
5	Workington	16	Howarth 13, Wells 3

Semi finals

- Ipswich bt Redcar 7–2
- Somerset bt Peterborough 7–2

Final

- Ipswich bt Somerset 7–2

== Fours ==
Edinburgh Monarchs won the Premier League Four-Team Championship, held on 1 October 2015, at the Media Prime Arena. The original final was postponed following injury delays after the semi finals had been completed at the East of England Arena, on 2 August.

Group A
Pos	Team	Pts	Riders
1	Ipswich	18	King 6, Manzares 4, Heeps 3, Covatti 3, Nielsen 2
2	Edinburgh	13	Cook 6, Wolbert 3, Sedgmen 3, Riss 1
3	Workington	11	Wells 5, Hansen 3, Bach 2, Howarth 1
4	Peterborough	6	Palm Toft 2, Blackbird 2, Ostergaard 1, Grondal 1, Konopka 0

Group B
Pos	Team	Pts	Riders
1	Newcastle	17	Worrall 5, Kerr 5, Rosen 4, Lindgren 3
2	Somerset	13	Kurtz 6, Worrall 3, Grajczonek 2, Lanham 2
3	Rye House	12	Kennett 6, Jakobsen 4, Nielsen 2, Mellgren 0
4	Glasgow	6	Lawson 4, Palovaara 1, Sarjeant 1, Summers 0

Final
Pos	Team	Pts	Riders
1	Edinburgh	30	Cook 12, Sedgmen 8, Masters 7, Riss 3
2	Somerset	27	Kurtz 10, Grajczonek 7, Worrall 6, Wright 4
3	Ipswich	24	King 10, Tungate 6, Covatti 5, Manzares 2, Heeps 1
4	Newcastle	15	Aarnio 6, Rosen 4, Worrall 3, Lindgren 2

== Final leading averages ==
Rider	Team	Average
(England) Simon Stead	Sheffield	10.41
(England) Craig Cook	Edinburgh	10.35
(England) Danny King	Ipswich	9.54
(England) Richard Lawson	Glasgow	9.12
(Australia) Sam Masters	Edinburgh	8.98
(Australia) Brady Kurtz	Somerset	8.73
(England) Oliver Allen	Peterborough	8.51
(Australia) Josh Grajczonek	Somerset	8.50
(England) Jason Garrity	Sheffield	8.46
(England) Robert Lambert	Peterborough/Rye House	8.38

== Riders & final averages ==
Berwick Bandits

- (Denmark) Claus Vissing 8.54
- (Denmark) Thomas Jørgensen 7.94
- (England) Ben Barker 7.71 (Note: Mathias Thörnblom replaced Ben Barker for the twenty-first declaration of the season.)
- (Australia) Kevin Doolan 7.57
- (Sweden) Anders Mellgren 5.92 (Note: Anders Mellgren replaced Alex Edberg for the thirtieth declaration of the season.)
- (England) Richard Hall 4.94 (Note: Richard Hall replaced Luke Crang for the sixth declaration of the season.)
- (Sweden) Mathias Thörnblom 4.84
- (Sweden) Alex Edberg 4.78
- (Slovenia) Matic Voldrih 2.50 (Note: Hynek Štichauer replaced Matic Voldrih for the second declaration of the season.)
- (Argentina) Coty García 3.02 (Note: Coty García replaced Hynek Štichauer for the fifteenth declaration of the season.)
- (Czech Republic) Hynek Štichauer 2.43
- (England) Luke Crang 2.00

Edinburgh Monarchs

- (England) Craig Cook 10.35
- (Australia) Sam Masters 8.98
- (Germany) Kevin Wölbert 8.18
- (Australia) Justin Sedgmen 7.84
- (Germany) Erik Riss 5.22
- (England) Max Clegg 3.48
- (Australia) Robert Branford 3.40

Glasgow Tigers

- (Denmark) Richard Lawson 9.12
- (Australia) Aaron Summers 8.37
- (Australia) Nick Morris 7.91
- (Finland) Kauko Nieminen 7.00 (Note: Kauko Nieminen replaced David Howe for the twenty-third declaration of the season.)
- (England) David Howe 6.72 (Note: David Howe replaced Kozza Smith for the fifteenth declaration of the season.)
- (Australia) Kozza Smith 5.87
- (Sweden) Victor Palovaara 5.28
- (France) Dimitri Bergé 4.69 (Note: Hynek Štichauer replaced Dimitri Bergé for the twenty-third declaration of the season.)
- (Czech Republic) Hynek Štichauer 4.22
- (England) James Sarjeant 5.00

Ipswich Witches

- (England) Danny King 9.54
- (Australia) Rohan Tungate 7.74
- (Italy) Nicolás Covatti 7.55
- (Australia) Cameron Heeps 5.87
- (United States) Gino Manzares 5.43
- (England) Stefan Nielsen 4.74
- (England) Ashley Morris 4.53 (Note: Ashley Morris replaced Ritchie Hawkins for the seventeenth declaration of the season.)
- (England) Ritchie Hawkins 3.35

Newcastle Diamonds

- (England) Steve Worrall 8.08
- (Sweden) Ludvig Lindgren 7.05
- (England) Lewis Kerr 7.03
- (Finland) Tero Aarnio 5.28 (Note: Tero Aarnio replaced Lewis Rose for the twenty-first declaration of the season.)
- (Sweden) Anton Rosén 5.14
- (Australia) Christian Henry 4.97
- (Denmark) Simon Nielsen 4.38
- (England) Lewis Rose 3.84

Peterborough Panthers

- (England) Oliver Allen 8.51 (Note: Emil Grøndal replaced Oliver Allen for the nineteenth declaration of the season.)
- (England) Robert Lambert 8.38 (Note: Ben Barker replaced Robert Lambert for the twenty-eighth declaration of the season.)
- (Denmark) Ulrich Østergaard 7.87
- (England) Ben Barker 7.56
- (Denmark) Anders Thomsen 6.62 (Note: Anders Thomsen replaced Lewis Blackbird for the thirtieth declaration of the season.)
- (England) Lewis Blackbird 6.16
- (Denmark) Michael Palm Toft 5.96
- (England) Simon Lambert 5.19
- (Denmark) Emil Grøndal 5.12
- (England) Oliver Greenwood 2.61 (Note: Rafał Konopka replaced Oliver Greenwood for the eighteenth declaration of the season.)
- (Poland) Rafał Konopka 2.58

Plymouth Devils

- (United States) Ryan Fisher 7.52
- (Australia) Jack Holder 7.10
- (Denmark) Morten Risager 6.86
- (England) Kyle Newman 6.84
- (Australia) Todd Kurtz 6.79 (Note: Todd Kurtz replaced Ashley Morris for the tenth declaration of the season.)
- (Sweden) Linus Eklöf 5.50 (Note: Linus Eklöf replaced James Wright for the thirtieth declaration of the season.)
- (England) James Wright 4.87 (Note: James Wright replaced Roland Benko for the twenty-third declaration of the season.)
- (Czech Republic) Zdeněk Simota 5.38
- (England) Ashley Morris 4.00
- (Hungary) Roland Benko 2.74 (Note: Roland Benko replaced Sam Chapman for the thirteenth declaration of the season.)
- (England) Sam Chapman 0.31

Redcar Bears

- (Denmark) Lasse Bjerre 8.30
- (Czech Republic) Matěj Kůs 7.13
- (Australia) Hugh Skidmore 6.84 (Note: Adam Roynon replaced Hugh Skidmore for the sixth declaration of the season.)
- (England) Stuart Robson 6.50
- (Denmark) Jonas Andersen 5.60 (Note: Jonas Andersen replaced Rafał Konopka for the fifteenth declaration of the season.)
- (England) Adam Roynon 4.39
- (France) Dimitri Bergé 4.14 (Note: Dimitri Bergé replaced Ben Morley for the twenty-third declaration of the season.)
- (Denmark) Jan Graversen 3.83
- (Poland) Rafał Konopka 2.71
- (England) Ben Morley 2.68

Rye House Rockets

- (England) Edward Kennett 9.57
- (England) Robert Lambert 8.34 (Note: Robert Lambert replaced Anders Mellgren for the thirtieth declaration of the season.)
- (Denmark) Nikolaj Busk Jakobsen 6.91
- (Sweden) Anders Mellgren 6.16
- (England) Steve Boxall 6.15 (Note: Danny Maassen replaced Steve Boxall for the nineteenth declaration of the season.)
- (Denmark) Kasper Lykke 5.74
- (Sweden) Robin Aspegren 4.98 (Note: Dan Greenwood replaced Robin Aspegren for the thirtieth declaration of the season.)
- (England) Luke Bowen 4.26 (Note: Dan Greenwood replaced Luke Bowen for the fourth declaration of the season. This change was reverted for the twentieth declaration.)
- (Germany) Danny Maassen 2.22
- (England) Dan Greenwood 1.66

Scunthorpe Scorpions

- (England) Josh Auty 8.00 (Note: Zdeněk Holub replaced Josh Auty for the twenty-fifth declaration of the season.)
- (England) David Howe 7.41 (Note: Ryan Douglas replaced David Howe for the ninth declaration of the season.)
- (Australia) Ryan Douglas 6.68 (Note: Leigh Lanham replaced Ryan Douglas for the thirtieth declaration of the season.)
- (Netherlands) Theo Pijper 6.53
- (England) Alex Davies 6.26
- (England) Leigh Lanham 5.78
- (England) Carl Wilkinson 5.33
- (England) Ben Wilson 4.82 (Note: Andreas Lyager replaced Ben Wilson for the twenty-sixth declaration of the season.) (Note: Ben Wilson replaced Ellis Perks for the ninth declaration of the season.)
- (Finland) Nike Lunna 4.50
- (Denmark) Andreas Lyager 4.00
- (Czech Republic) Zdeněk Holub 3.20
- (England) Ellis Perks 2.08

Sheffield Tigers

- (England) Simon Stead 10.41 (Note: Andre Compton replaced Simon Stead for the thirtieth declaration of the season.)
- (England) Jason Garrity 8.46 (Note: Jason Garrity replaced David Bellego for the second declaration of the season.)
- (Australia) Ty Proctor 6.68 (Note: David Bellego replaced Ty Proctor for the twelfth declaration of the season.)
- (England) Andre Compton 6.61 (Note: Nicolai Klindt replaced Andre Compton for the twenty-fourth declaration of the season.)
- (France) David Bellego 5.98
- (Denmark) Nicolai Klindt 5.89
- (England) Josh Bates 5.58
- (England) Ashley Birks 5.57 (Note: Michele Paco Castagna replaced Ashley Birks for the twenty-third declaration of the season.)
- (Sweden) Robin Aspegren 4.82 (Note: Robin Aspegren replaced Arthur Sissis for the thirtieth declaration of the season.)
- (Australia) Arthur Sissis 3.71
- (Italy) Michele Paco Castagna 3.33

Somerset Rebels

- (Australia) Brady Kurtz 8.73
- (Australia) Josh Grajczonek 8.50
- (England) Charles Wright 6.89
- (England) Richie Worrall 6.84
- (England) Paul Starke 6.00
- (Denmark) Rasmus Jensen 5.92 (Note: Rasmus Jensen replaced Leigh Lanham for the twenty-sixth declaration of the season.)
- (England) Leigh Lanham 5.81
- (England) Oliver Greenwood 2.06 (Note: Oliver Greenwood replaced Benji Compton for the nineteenth declaration of the season.)
- (England) Benji Compton 1.24

Workington Comets

- (United States) Ricky Wells 8.86
- (Denmark) René Bach 7.42
- (England) Kyle Howarth 6.98
- (Denmark) Kenneth Hansen 6.84
- (Australia) Rusty Harrison 5.48
- (Australia) Matthew Wethers 4.96
- (Denmark) Nicki Barrett 3.01
- (England) Matt Williamson 1.97
- (England) Nathan Greaves 1.29

== See also ==
- List of United Kingdom Speedway League Champions
- Knockout Cup (speedway)
