= 1995 Danish speedway season =

Season of speedway in Denmark

The 1995 Danish speedway season was the 1995 season of motorcycle speedway in Denmark.

== Individual ==
=== Individual Championship ===
The 1995 Danish Individual Speedway Championship was the 1995 edition of the Danish Individual Speedway Championship. The final was held over 2 rounds at the Hedensted Løsning Speedway Center on 27 May and at the Uhre Speedway Center, Herning on 28 May. The title was won by Brian Andersen.

There was a significant change caused by the creation of the Speedway Grand Prix, which was the new version of the World Championship. Four riders from the Danish final would progress to the Scandinavian Final as part of the 1996 Speedway Grand Prix Qualification. This would not necessarily be the top four because a Danish rider could already have been a permanent Grand Prix rider, which would allow the next best rider to qualify.

Final

| Pos. | Rider | Team | Scores | Total | Race off |
|---|---|---|---|---|---|
| 1 | Brian Andersen | Fredericia | 11,14 | 25 | 3 |
| 2 | Brian Karger | Fredericia | 10,15 | 25 | 2 |
| 3 | John Jørgensen | Fjelsted | 11,12 | 23 | |
| 4 | Gert Handberg | Slangerup | 8,13 | 21 | |
| 5 | Ronni Pedersen | Fjelsted | 8,11 | 19 | 3 |
| 6 | Bo Skov Eriksen | Holsted | 11,8 | 19 | 2 |
| 7 | Aksel Jepsen | Outrup | 11,7 | 18 | |
| 8 | Ole Hansen | Fredericia | 7,9 | 16 | |
| 9 | Jens Henry Nielsen | Brovst | 5,8 | 13 | |
| 10 | Martin Vinther | Fredericia | 7,6 | 13 | |
| 11 | Hans Clausen | Holsted | 9,1 | 10 | |
| 12 | Martin Greve | Vissenbjerg | 7,2 | 9 | |
| 13 | Claus Jacobsen | Holstebro | 5,4 | 9 | |
| 14 | Anders Nielsen | Slangerup | 4,3 | 7 | |
| 15 | Jacob Olsen | Vojens | 4,0 | 4 | |
| 16 | Per Sörensen | Slangerup | 1,3 | 4 | |
| 17 | Klaus Rasmussen (res) | Holsted | dnr,4 | 4 | |
| 18 | Jesper B. Jensen (res) | Holsted | dnr, dnr | 0 | |

Key - Each heat has four riders, 3 points for a heat win, 2 for 2nd, 1 for third and 0 for last

=== Junior Championship ===
Charlie Gjedde won the Junior Championship.

== Team ==
=== Danish Superliga ===
The 1995 season was won by Fjelsted for the 4th time.

| Pos | Team | P | Pts |
|---|---|---|---|
| 1 | Fjelsted | 14 | 38 |
| 2 | Holsted | 14 | 35 |
| 3 | Fredericia | 14 | 27 |
| 4 | Outrup | 14 | 22 |
| 5 | Slangerup | 14 | 18 |
| 6 | Herning | 14 | 17 |
| 7 | Holstebro | 14 | 5 |
| 8 | Randers | 14 | 4 |
