= Jan Jakobsen =

Danish speedway rider

- Born: 12 May 1965; Middelfart, Denmark
- Died: 23 August 2020 (aged 55)
- Nationality: Danish

Career history

Denmark
- 1981–1992: Fjelsted
- 2000: Holstebro

Great Britain
- 1987: Cradley Heathens

Individual honours
- 1984: Danish U21 champion

Team honours
- 1986, 1992: Danish Speedway League
- 1987: British League KO Cup Winner
- 1987: Midland Cup Winner

Jan Jakobsen (12 May 1965 – 23 August 2020) was a motorcycle speedway rider from Denmark.

== Career ==
Jakobsen came to prominence after winning the Danish Under 21 Individual Speedway Championship in 1984.

Jakobsen reached the final of the Under-21 World Championship in 1986. Also in 1986, he won the Danish Speedway League with Fjelsted Speedway Klub.

Jakobsen started racing in the British leagues during the 1987 British League season, when riding for the Cradley Heathens as a replacement for Alan Grahame. He had initially been targeted by Swindon Robins that season. He won another Danish Speedway League title with Fjelsted in 1992.

Jakobsen was also a successful team manager but died in 2020.

== Personal life ==
Jakobsen's son Frederik is a speedway rider.
