= Billund Municipality Stadium =

Stadium in Grindsted, Denmark

- Location: Blåbjergvej 1, 7200 Grindsted, Denmark
- Coordinates: 55°47′37″N 8°58′20″E
- Opened: 1990

Billund Municipality Stadium (Danish: Billund Kommunes Stadion) is a speedway track in Grindsted, Denmark. The track is located on the Blåbjergvej 1 road, about 6 kilometres north east of the town. The stadium hosts the speedway team known as the Grindsted Speedway Klub (GSK), who race in the Danish Speedway League.

== History ==
The track opened in 1990 after initially struggling to get the necessary permits. Over the following three decades the track primarily hosted the Danish league fixtures of GSK but began to be awarded other events by the Danish Motor Union. The events included finals of the Danish Under 21 Individual Speedway Championship in 2011 and 2022.

The track was awarded its biggest event to date for the 2024 season, which was the final of the Danish Individual Speedway Championship.
