= Sam Chapman (speedway rider) =

British speedway rider

- Born: 16 February 1989 (age 37); Truro, Cornwall, England
- Nationality: British (English)

Career history
- 2014: Scunthorpe Stags
- 2015: Birmingham Brummies
- 2015: Plymouth Devils

Team honours
- 2015: National League
- 2015: National League Fours

Samuel Chapman (born 16 February 1989) is a former motorcycle speedway rider from England.

== Career ==
Born in Cornwall, Chapman competed in Motocross before later switching to Speedway. He was given his first regular team place by the Scunthorpe Stags in the National League in 2014. Starting on a standard 3.00 average he finished the season on a much improved 5.45 average, riding at number 1 for the Stags in what was a disappointing season for the team.

After a successful first season in the National League, Chapman swapped the struggling Stags team for the newly reformed Birmingham Brummies, a team tipped by many to mount a serious title challenge. He was also given the opportunity to double up and combine riding for the Brummies with riding with local team the Plymouth Devils in the Premier League, as a pre-season replacement for Hungarian rider Roland Benko who had to withdraw for personal reasons.

Chapman was part of the Birmingham team that won the league title during the 2015 National League speedway season and the National League Fours, held on 14 June 2015 at Brandon Stadium but lost his team place the following season.
