= Marcus Birkemose =

Danish speedway rider (born 2003)

- Born: 9 October 2003 (age 23); Langeskov, Denmark
- Nationality: Danish

Career history

Denmark
- 2019: Grindsted
- 2021: Fjelsted
- 2022: Region Varde
- 2025: Slangerup

Poland
- 2020: Poznań
- 2020–2021: Gorzów
- 2025: Gdańsk
- 2026: Krosno

Individual honours
- 2020: European Junior Champion

Team honours
- 2020, 2021: World team Junior silver
- 2025: Danish league champion

Marcus Birkemose (born 9 October 2003) is a Danish international speedway rider.

== Speedway career ==
Birkemose became the European Junior Champion after winning the 2020 Individual Speedway Junior European Championship.

In 2022, Birkemose joined Region Varde Elitesport but the following year in 2023, he received a two-year ban for smoking Hashish.

During the 2025 Danish speedway season, Birkemose helped Slangerup retain the Speedway Ligaen title.

In 2026, he joined Wilki Krosno, where he was a top athlete, but on June 18 he was suspended for a reoffending from three years earlier.
