= Marius Nielsen =

Danish speedway rider

- Born: 20 January 2001 (age 25); Køge, Denmark
- Nationality: Danish

Career history

Denmark
- 2018–2019: Slangerup
- 2021–2022: Holsted
- 2023: Fjelsted

Poland
- 2022: Ostrów

Sweden
- 2022: Indianerna

Team honours
- 2021: Danish Speedway League winner

Marius Nielsen (born 20 January 2001) is a motorcycle speedway rider from Denmark.

== Career ==
Nielsen started at the age of six when he rode a 50cc bike. riding 50 cc before moving up to 85cc in 2010.

Nielsen rides in three of the four top European leagues. In the Danish Speedway League, he rode for Holsted Tigers in 2022 and Fjelsted in 2023. He also rides in the Team Speedway Polish Championship for Ostrów and in the Swedish Speedway Team Championship for Indianerna.

During the 2021 Danish speedway season, Nielsen helped Holsted become the Swedish champions. He reached the final of three successive Danish under 21 championships in 2020, 2021, and 2022.
