= Patrick Hansen =

Danish speedway rider

- Born: 28 October 1998 (age 28); Kalundborg, Denmark
- Nationality: Danish

Career history

Denmark
- 2015: Fjelsted
- 2016–2017: Esbjerg
- 2019: Region Varde
- 2018, 2021–2024: Grindsted
- 2025: SES

Poland
- 2022: Gorzów
- 2023–2024: Rybnik
- 2025: Łódź

Sweden
- 2021: Masarna
- 2025: Dackarna

Patrick Hansen (born 28 October 1998) is a former motorcycle speedway rider from Denmark.

== Career ==
Hansen rode in the Individual Speedway European Championship and finished in 12th place during the 2021 Speedway European Championship.

In June 2023, Hansen finished third behind Mikkel Michelsen in the 2023 Danish Individual Speedway Championship and looked set for a promising future. However, two months later in August, he was involved in a crash while riding in Poland and suffered a serious spinal injury, a broken ankle and lung damage.

Hansen underwent rehabilitation in Kraków and managed to declare himself fit for the 2024 Danish speedway season. and re-signed for Grindsted Speedway Klub for a fourth consecutive year.

In 2025, Hansen competed in three countries, riding for Sønderjylland Elite Speedway in Denmark, Dackarna in Sweden and Orzeł Łódź in Poland but was unable to capture his previous form. The injury was the primary reason for his March 2026 announcement that he was retiring from speedway.
