= Thomas Jørgensen (speedway rider) =

Danish motorcycle speedway rider

- Born: 14 July 1992 (age 34); Aalborg, Denmark
- Nationality: Danish

Career history

Denmark
- 2009–2010: Brovst
- 2011: Vojens
- 2012: Slangerup
- 2013–2014: Esbjerg
- 2015: Holstebro
- 2016: Munkebo
- 2017–2018: Region Varde
- 2019: Grindsted
- 2021–2022: Nordjysk
- 2022: Holsted
- 2013, 2023: Fjelsted

Great Britain
- 2011–2014, 2021: Scunthorpe
- 2012: Wolverhampton
- 2015–2016, 2023: Berwick
- 2017: Workington
- 2017-2023: King's Lynn
- 2018: Redcar
- 2019: Newcastle

Team honours
- 2012: Premier League (tier 2)

Thomas Jørgensen (born 14 July 1992) is a Danish speedway rider.

== Speedway career ==
Jørgensen first came to notice in the United Kingdom in July 2010, whilst a member of the Team Viking touring side. In a meeting against Plymouth, he broke the track record and became the first rider to go below 50 seconds. Following a string of impressive performances on that tour, Jørgensen attracted the attention of several Premier League clubs, eventually signing a contract with Scunthorpe Scorpions for the 2011 season. He returned to the United Kingdom late in 2010 for a one off meeting at Scunthorpe where he became winner of the inaugural Rob Woffinden memorial trophy.

Jørgensen stayed at Scunthorpe for four seasons in total, averaging around 7 each year before joining Berwick Bandits for the 2015 Premier League speedway season. He averaged just below 8, which sealed another year with the Scottish club for the 2016 season.

In 2017, Jørgensen joined the King's Lynn Stars and has remained with them since. In 2022, he rode for King's Lynn in the SGB Premiership 2022.

In 2022, Jørgensen was riding for Nordjysk in his native Denmark, but the club withdrew from the Danish Speedway League which resulted in him switching to Holsted Tigers. His 2022 season was hampered by having COVID-19.

In 2023, Jørgensen re-signed for King's Lynn for the SGB Premiership 2023 and also signed for Berwick Bandits for the SGB Championship 2023, having previously ridden for them during 2015 and 2016. However, he suffered a bad injury, breaking a vertebra in his neck and back, which ended his season.

Jørgensen re-joined Redcar for the 2024 season but then withdrew from the team because he required surgery on his back injury.
