= Nicklas Porsing =

Danish speedway rider

- Born: 7 January 1993 (age 33); Herning, Denmark
- Nationality: Danish

Career history

Denmark
- 2009–2012, 2015, 2018: Holsted
- 2014: Region Varde
- 2016, 2022: Slangerup
- 2013, 2017: Grindsted

Poland
- 2014–2015: Ostrów
- 2015–2018: Rzeszów
- 2019: Wilki Krosno

Sweden
- 2014: Piraterna
- 2013–2015: Vargarna
- 2017: Rospiggarna

Great Britain
- 2013–2017, 2019: King's Lynn
- 2016: Peterborough

Team honours
- 2013: Under-21 World Cup

Nicklas Andre Porsing (born 7 January 1993) is a Danish motorcycle speedway rider who has raced in leagues in Denmark, Poland, Sweden and the United Kingdom.

== Career ==
Born in Herning, Porsing started his senior career at Holsted Speedway Klub in Denmark. He finished second in the European Junior Championship and reached the final of the Under-21 World Championship (finishing fifth) in 2012. In 2013, he again reached the final of the Under-21 World Championship and was part of the winning Danish team at the Under-21 World Cup in Pardubice.

In 2013, Porsing was signed mid-season by King's Lynn Stars to ride in the Elite League as cover for the injured Mads Korneliussen and was retained for the 2014 and 2015 seasons. He returned to Lynn towards the end of the 2016 season and remained in the team for 2017.

Porsing signed for ZKS Ostrovia's second division team in 2013 and has stayed with the club, signing again to ride in the Speedway Ekstraliga in 2015.

In 2016, Porsing signed for Peterborough Panthers and returned to Britain with King's Lynn in 2019.
