= Emil Pørtner =

Danish speedway rider

- Born: 20 April 2000 (age 26); Denmark
- Nationality: Danish

Career history

Denmark
- 2017–2018: Holstebro
- 2016, 2019: Brovst
- 2019: Slangerup
- 2022–2023: Grindsted

Poland
- 2022–2023: Toruń

Sweden
- 2022: Lejonen
- 2023–2024: Gislaved

Individual honours
- 2021: Danish U21 silver medal

Emil Pørtner (born 20 April 2000) is a motorcycle speedway rider from Denmark.

== Career ==
Pørtner rides in three of the four top speedway leagues. In 2022, he rode in his native Denmark for Grindsted, who compete in the Danish Speedway League. He also rides in the Team Speedway Polish Championship for Toruń since 2021 and in the Swedish Speedway Team Championship for Lejonen.

In 2019, Pørtner reached the final of the U19 European Championship. He won the silver medal in the 2021 Danish Under 21 Individual Speedway Championship.

In 2022, Pørtner was capped by the Denmark national under-21 speedway team. He also suffered a serious injury riding for Lejonen forcing him to miss the remainder of the season.
