= Sam Jensen =

Danish speedway rider

- Born: 17 January 1997 (age 29); Denmark
- Nationality: Danish

Career history

Denmark
- 2015, 2017-2021: Holsted
- 2016: Holstebro
- 2022: Nordjysk
- 2022: Esbjerg
- 2023: Region Varde
- 2024–2025: Fjelsted

Great Britain
- 2019, 2021: Glasgow

Sweden
- 2022: Smålänningarna
- 2024–2025: Njudungarna

Poland
- 2023: Daugavpils

Individual honours
- 2017: Danish U21 Champion

Sam Jensen (born 17 January 1997) is a speedway rider from Denmark.

== Speedway career ==
Jensen rode for Hosted Tigers in his native Denmark from 2015 until 2021, except 2016, when he was loaned to Holstebro.

In 2017, Jensen became the Danish U21 Champion. In 2019, he signed for Glasgow Tigers for the SGB Championship 2019. He spent a second season with the Scottish club during the SGB Championship 2021 season.
