= Andreas Lyager =

Danish speedway rider

- Born: 1 December 1997 (age 28); Fredericia, Denmark
- Nationality: Danish
- Website: official website

Career history

Denmark
- 2013: Outrup
- 2014: Grindsted
- 2015–2025: Slangerup

Poland
- 2022: Rybnik
- 2023–2024: Bydgoszcz
- 2025: Łódź

Sweden
- 2018: Nässjö
- 2019-2020: Vetlanda
- 2021-2022: Indianerna
- 2024: Rospiggarna
- 2025: Piraterna

Great Britain
- 2015-2016: Scunthorpe

Individual honours
- 2018: Danish Junior champion
- 2017: European Junior Championship bronze

Team honours
- 2018: World team Junior silver
- 2024, 2025: Danish league champion

Andreas Lyager Hansen (born 1 December 1997) is a speedway rider from Denmark.

== Speedway career ==
Lyager joined Scunthorpe Scorpions for the 2015 Premier League speedway season and 2016 Premier League speedway season.

Lyager reached two finals of the World Under-21 Championships in 2017 and 2018 and was the Danish Junior champion in 2018, following two silver medals in the previous two years. He also won three medals at the Junior World Team Championships (bronze in 2016 and 2017 and silver in 2018) and a bronze medal at the 2017 Individual Speedway Junior European Championship.

In 2022, Lyager rode for Rybnik in Poland, Slangerup in Denmark and Indianerna in Sweden. On 25 May 2024, he was eliminated in the 2025 Speedway Grand Prix Qualification. Lyager helped Slangerup win the Danish Speedway League during the 2024 Danish speedway season.

During the 2025 Danish speedway season, Lyager helped Slangerup retain the Speedway Ligaen title
