= Tim Sørensen (speedway rider) =

Danish speedway rider

- Born: 14 May 2000 (age 26); Denmark
- Nationality: Danish

Career history

Denmark
- 2016: Munkebo
- 2017–2018: Esbjerg
- 2019–2025: Region Varde

Poland
- 2022: Ostrów
- 2024: Bydgoszcz
- 2024: Gniezno
- 2025: Gdańsk

Sweden
- 2022: Masarna
- 2025: Piraterna

Individual honours
- 2022: Norwegian champion
- 2021: Danish U21 champion

Team honours
- 2020, 2021: World team Junior silver

Tim Sørensen (born 14 May 2000) is a speedway rider from Denmark.

== Speedway career ==
Sørensen first rode in the Danish leagues for Munkebo before signing for Esbjerg in 2017.

Sørensen came to prominence during the 2020 season when he was part of the Danish team that won the silver medal at the 2020 Team Speedway Junior World Championship. The following year, he was once again selected by Denmark for the event and won the silver medal again at the 2021 Team Speedway Junior World Championship. He was also the Danish Under 21 Individual Speedway Championship winner in 2021.

In 2022, Sørensen made his debut for a Polish side representing Ostrów, he had previously signed for Orzeł Łódź in 2020 but the COVID-19 pandemic meant that he could not ride. Also in 2022, he rode for Masarna in the Elitserien and won the 2022 Norwegian Individual Speedway Championship.

Sørensen continued to ride for Region Varde in 2023 and 2024.
