= Nicolai Klindt =

Danish speedway rider

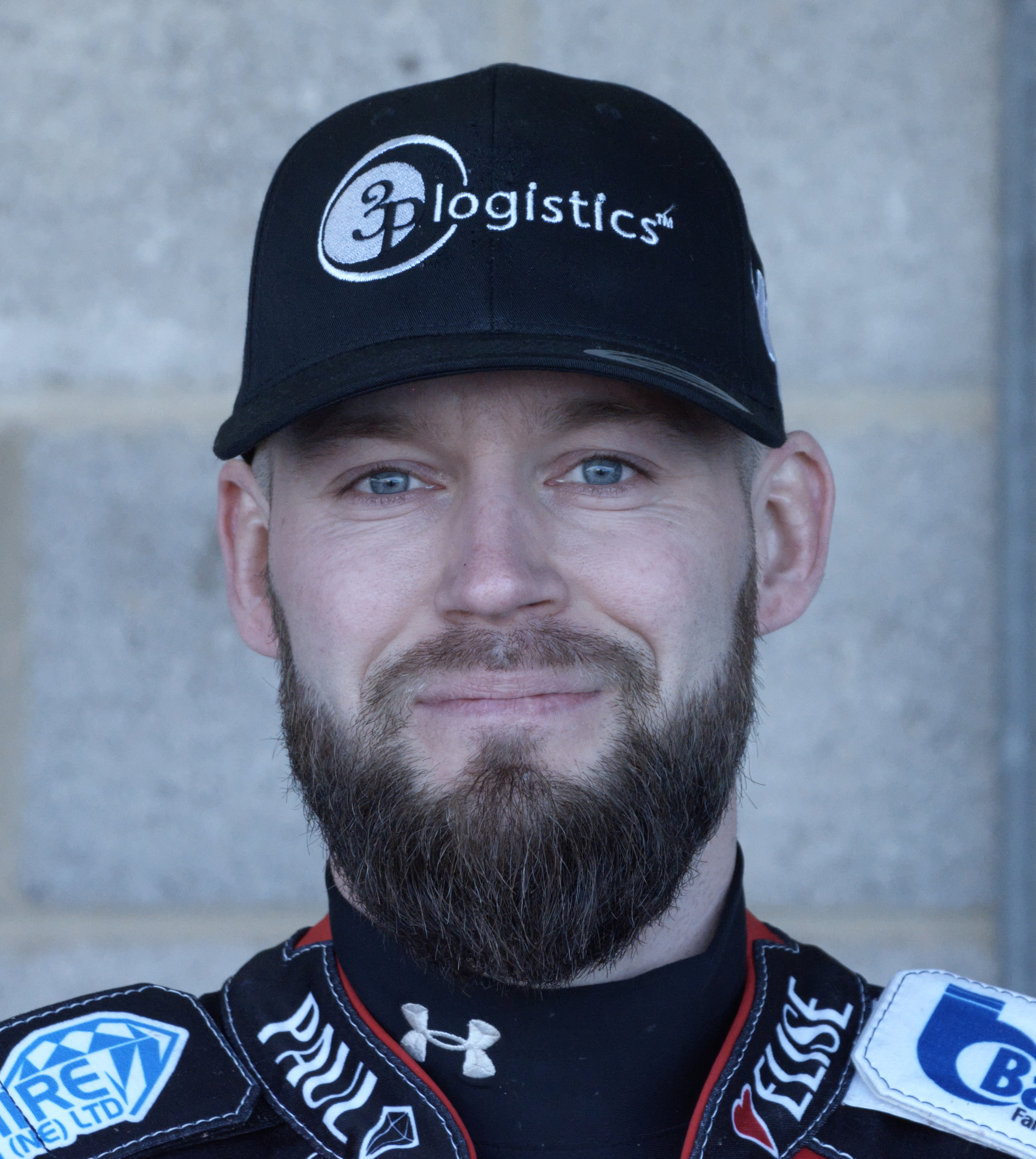
- Born: 29 December 1988 (age 37); Outrup, Denmark
- Nationality: Danish

Career history

Denmark
- 2004, 2006–2008, 2010, 2024–2025: Outrup/Region Varde
- 2005: Fredericia
- 2009, 2011, 2012–2015, 2018–2019: Holsted
- 2016: Grindsted
- 2017: Esbjerg
- 2021–2023: SES

Poland
- 2006-2007, 2012-2013: Wrocław
- 2008: Zielona Góra
- 2009, 2018-2022: Ostrów
- 2010, 2022: Rybnik
- 2011: Daugavpils
- 2014, 2025: Rzeszów
- 2015: Łódź
- 2016: Częstochowa
- 2017: Kraków
- 2020: Gorzów
- 2023–2024: Gdańsk

Sweden
- 2006–2007: Team Bikab
- 2008: Smederna
- 2015: Vetlanda
- 2021: Lejonen
- 2022: Dackarna

Great Britain
- 2008–2010, 2012: Wolverhampton
- 2011, 2014: Swindon
- 2013, 2022–2025: King's Lynn
- 2013: Peterborough
- 2013–2014, 2016: Scunthorpe
- 2015: Sheffield
- 2016: Leicester
- 2017–2019: Poole
- 2018: Workington
- 2020–2021: Ipswich
- 2024: Oxford
- 2025: Plymouth

Individual honours
- 2007: U-19 European Champion
- 2020: Danish championship silver medal
- 2006, 2008: Danish U21 champion

Team honours
- 2010: Speedway World Cup silver
- 2008, 2009: U-21 World Cup silver medal
- 2015: Elitserien League Champion
- 2018: SGB Premiership 2018

Nicolai Klindt (born 29 December 1988) is a Danish motorcycle speedway rider who won the 2007 Individual Under-19 European title.

== Career ==
In 2006, Klindt won the Danish Under 21 Individual Speedway Championship and followed up the success by winning the 2007 European U19 title.

In 2008, Klindt signed for his first British league team Wolverhampton Wolves for the 2008 Elite League speedway season and also won his second Danish U21 title. He spent two more seasons at Wolves, improving his average to 6.91, making his debut for Denmark in the 2009 Speedway World Cup and winning a silver medal at the 2010 Speedway World Cup. He switch to the Swindon Robins in 2011 before returning to Wolves for the 2012 and 2013 seasons.

Over the next few seasons, Klindt rode for various clubs from 2014 to 2016. During the 2017, 2018 and 2019 seasons Klindt rode for Poole Pirates and helped them win the SGB Premiership 2018 and the 2017 and 2019 Premiership Shield. The following season, he signed for Ipswich Witches but the 2020 season was curtailed by the COVID-19 pandemic, however he returned to ride for them during the SGB Premiership 2021.

In 2022, Klindt joined the King's Lynn Stars for the SGB Premiership 2022. Also in 2022, he helped SES win the 2022 Danish Super League.

In 2023, Klindt re-signed for King's Lynn as the team captain for the SGB Premiership 2023. In August 2023, while riding in a Polish fixture, he suffered a serious crash, which resulted in a broken neck but he still had movement in his legs and arms.

On his return from injury, Klindt signed for the Oxford Spires for the 2024 season but was soon replaced by Erik Riss and subsequently returned to King's Lynn.

== Highlights ==
- 2005 Team Danish Championship winners
- 2005 – Team U-21 World Championship 3rd place (5 points)
- 2006 Individual U-21 Danish Championship
- 2006 Individual U-19 Danish Championship
- 2006 Polish Under-21 Pairs Championship bronze medal
- 2006 Team Polish Championship winners
- 2006 – Team U-21 World Championship 3rd place (12 points)
- 2007 – Team U-21 World Championship 2nd place in Semi-Final A (8 points)
- 2007 Individual U-19 European Championship champion (14 points)
- 2008 – Team U-21 World Championship 2nd place (12 points)
- 2008 Individual U-21 Danish Championship
- 2009 – Team U-21 World Championship Runner-up (13 pts)
- 2009 – Individual U-21 World Championship – 6th place (10 pts)

== See also ==
- Denmark speedway team
