= Frederik Jakobsen =

Danish speedway rider

- Born: 1 May 1998 (age 28); Ejby, Denmark
- Nationality: Danish

Career history

Denmark
- 2015–2022, 2024–2025: Fjelsted
- 2023: Region Varde

Great Britain
- 2018: Poole
- 2022–2023: King's Lynn

Sweden
- 2020–2022, 2025: Dackarna
- 2024: Smederna

Poland
- 2022–2023: Grudziądz
- 2024–2025: Ostrów

Team honours
- 2024: European Pairs champion

Frederik Jakobsen (born 1 May 1998) is a motorcycle speedway rider from Denmark.

== Career ==
Jakobsen was born into a speedway family, with his father Jan Jakobsen riding for Cradley Heath Heathens in 1987.

In 2018, Jakobsen rode in the top tier of British Speedway, riding for the Poole Pirates in the SGB Premiership 2018. He was a finalist in the 2018 and 2019 Individual Speedway Junior World Championship.

In 2022, Jakobsen returned to the British league when riding for the King's Lynn Stars in the SGB Premiership 2022. In 2023, he re-signed for King's Lynn for the SGB Premiership 2023 but left mid-way through the season. He also signed for GKM Grudziądz for the 2023 Polish speedway season.

In 2024, Jakobsen signed for Smederna to ride in the Swedish Elitserien and won his first major honour when claiming the European Pairs title with Rasmus Jensen.
