= Jonas Jeppesen =

Danish speedway rider

- Born: 3 January 1998 (age 28); Bramming, Denmark
- Nationality: Danish

Career history

Denmark
- 2015–2018: Holsted
- 2019–2025: Esbjerg

Great Britain
- 2018: Somerset
- 2018: Ipswich
- 2025: Birmingham
- 2025: Berwick

Poland
- 2017, 2020: Ostrów
- 2019, 2024: Piła
- 2021–2022: Częstochowa
- 2023: Landshut

Sweden
- 2020–2021: Indianerna
- 2024: Vargarna

Team honours
- 2023: Danish League

Jonas Jeppesen (born 3 January 1998) is a Danish motorcycle speedway rider.

== Career ==
Jeppesen rode in the top tier of British Speedway, riding for the Somerset Rebels in the SGB Premiership 2018, in addition to riding for Ipswich Witches. He was a finalist in the 2019 Individual Speedway Junior World Championship.

In 2023, Jeppesen helped Esbjerg Vikings win the Danish League. In 2024, he made his Swedish Speedway Team Championship debut riding for Vargarna.
