= Fjelsted Speedway Klub =

Speedway club in Fjelsted near Harndrup, Denmark

Team Fjelsted

Club information
- Track address: Fjelsted Speedway Stadium; Ridderstien 31, 5463 Harndrup
- Country: Denmark
- Founded: 1971
- League: Danish Super League
- Website: Official Website

Club facts
- Track record date: 13 July 2022
- Track record holder: Frederik Jakobsen

Major team honours
Team champions	1982, 1986, 1992, 1995, 2017, 2019

Fjelsted Speedway Klub or Team Fjelsted is a motorcycle speedway club from the town of Fjelsted near Harndrup in Denmark, who compete in the Danish Speedway League. The team have won the Danish Speedway League title on six occasions.

== Track ==
The track called the Fjelsted Speedway Stadium is located 5 kilometres south of Harndrup and 1 kilometre south of Fjelsted, on Ridderstien 31.

== History ==
=== 1971 to 1985 ===
A mini speedway track was built in the spring of 1971 in an old apple garden. The venture was a collaboration between Ejby Junior Club, the Middelfart Municipality and rider Carl Andreasen. The Fjelsted Speedway Klub (FSK) was duly created and in 1976, after a lease agreement with a local farm owner was reached, a full size track was built in just 28 days, with the opening meeting in Easter.

FSK ran four teams in the Danish Tournament, they were called Leoparderne (the Leopards), Cometerne (the Comets), who were effectively the 1st and 2nd teams; and Raketternethe (the Rockets), Satelitterne (the Satellites) or Stjernerne (the Stars), who were the 3rd and 4th teams. The Leopards won the Danish Championship for the first time in FSK's history in 1982. The Leopards finished second in 1985, therefore qualifying for the following season's new Super League.

=== 1986 to 1999 ===
In 1986, the professional Danish Speedway League or Superliga was created, of which Fjested were not only a founder member but were the first winners. The team included Lars Henrik Jørgensen, Ole Hansen, Flemming Rasmussen, Jan Jakobsen and Allan Johansen. The club signed one of the world's leading riders Jan O. Pedersen and international John Jørgensen and were able to win a third Championship in 1992, despite Pedersen being injured because the American Billy Hamill deputised. Another Championship came the way of club in 1995, inspired by Jørgensen and Ronni Pedersen.

The club ran into severe financial difficulties in the late 1990s leading to the sale of the club's premises. In 1999, a combined Fjelsted/Odense team competed in the Superliga and they managed to win the silver medal during a season beset with problems. The Fjelsted track closed mid-season, resulting in the combined team having to race their remaining fixtures at the Munkebo Speedway Center. There was a silver lining when Brian Andersen became the 1999 Danish champion. However, the club then dropped out of the Super League.

=== 2007 to present ===
The club slowly recovered and returned to the Super league for the 2007 Danish speedway season, led by Hans Andersen who became Danish champion that year. The team reached Super Finals in 2012, 2013 and 2015.

The recovery was complete when they became champions of Denmark in 2017 and 2019. The riders involved included Peter Kildemand, Anders Thomsen and Frederik Jakobsen.

== Notable riders ==
- (Denmark) Brian Andersen
- (Denmark) Hans Andersen
- (United States) Billy Hamill
- (Denmark) John Jørgensen
- (Denmark) Peter Kildemand
- (Denmark) Jan O. Pedersen
- (Denmark) Ronni Pedersen
- (Denmark) Anders Thomsen
