= Slangerup Speedway Klub =

Speedway club in Slangerup, Denmark

Club information
- Track address: Slangerup Speedway Center, Hørup Skovvej 5A, 3550; Slangerup, Frederikssund Municipality
- Country: Denmark
- Founded: 1967
- Team manager: Patrick Hougaard
- League: Danish Super League
- Website: Official Website

Club facts
- Track size: 340 metres

Major team honours
Team champions	1983, 1988, 2008, 2010, 2011, 2024, 2025

Slangerup Speedway Klub is a motorcycle speedway club from Slangerup in the Frederikssund Municipality of Denmark, who compete in the Danish Speedway League. The team have won the Danish Speedway League title six times.

== Track ==
The track called the Slangerup Speedway Center is located on the western outskirts of Slangerup, on Hørup Skovvej 5A.

== History ==
=== 1929 to 1966 ===
Although the club were formed during the Easter of 1967 by Børge O. Christiansen, the history of speedway in Slangerup is linked by the founding of the Frederiksborg Amts Motorklub (FAM) on 14 August 1929. The connection with FAM was the building of a practice track in Slangerup adjacent to the Graese creek because of restrictions imposed on FAM's Selskov Speedway track in Hillerød during the 1960s.

=== 1967 to 1985 ===
The practice track became known as the Slangerup Speedway Centre, which opened in 1967. However, FAM still ran the teams of Kulsvierne (the Charcoalers), Drabanterne (the Guardsmen) and Skovtroldene (the Forest Trolls) in the Danish Tournament. In 1976, the decision was made to move the teams from Hillerød to Slangerup. The teams suffixed by the name Hillerød switched to the suffix by the name of Frederiksborg and the ties with Hillerød came pretty much to an end.

In 1983, Kulsvierne Frederiksborg became champions of Denmark for the first time. In 1985, the team finished in 10th place in division 1 outside of the places earmarked for the following season's new Super League. However, two teams above them were unable to take part in the new eight team league.

=== 1986 to 2007 ===
In 1986, the professional Danish Speedway League or Superliga was created, of which Slangerup were a founder member, finishing third. The team signed riders like Kurt Hansen and Per Sørensen and it paid dividends when they won the Championship for the second time (first named as Slangerup) in 1988.

Various riders were signed over the next two decades but the team experienced minimal success, although Brian Karger became Danish champion in 2000 when a Slangerup rider. In 2006 and 2007 the team finished runner-up in the league.

=== 2008 to 2023 ===
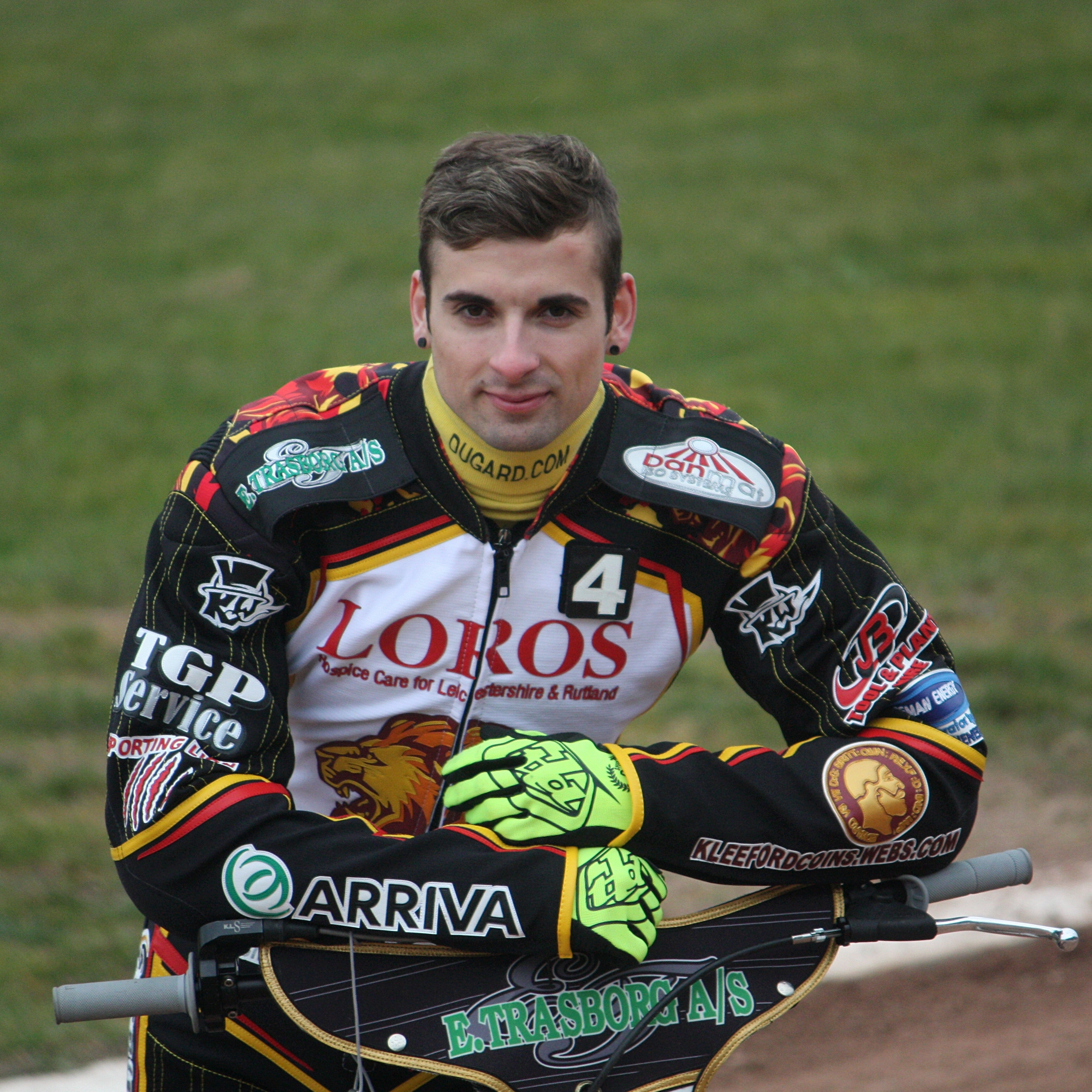
Mikkel Michelsen, rider with the club from 2008 to 2024

From 2008 until 2011, the team won three Championships and dominated Danish speedway. The title wins were achieved in 2009, 2010 and 2011. Riders such as Kenneth Bjerre, Jesper B. Monberg, Kenneth Kruse Hansen and Peter Ljung were instrumental in the success.

From 2013 to 2023, Slangerup reached the Super Final eight times but failed to win the Championship.

=== 2024 to present ===
During the 2024 Danish speedway season the team finally won the Danish Speedway League, after 13 years without winning. The riders instrumental were Patryk Dudek, Michael Jepsen Jensen, Andreas Lyager, Chris Holder and Mikkel Michelsen. The following year in 2025, led by Jepsen Jensen, Dudek and Michelsen again, they successfully retained the title by winning the Super Final.

== Notable riders ==
- (Denmark) Kenneth Bjerre
- (Australia) Jason Crump
- (Poland) Patryk Dudek
- (United States) Greg Hancock
- (Australia) Chris Holder
- (Denmark) Kenneth Kruse Hansen
- (Denmark) Kurt Hansen
- (Denmark) Michael Jepsen Jensen
- (Denmark) Brian Karger
- (Sweden) Peter Ljung
- (Denmark) Leon Madsen
- (Denmark) Mikkel Michelsen
- (Denmark) Jesper B. Monberg
- (Denmark) Ronni Pedersen
- (Denmark) Per Sørensen
