= Grindsted Speedway Klub =

Danish speedway club

Club information
- Track address: Billund Municipality Stadium; Blåbjergvej 1, 7200 Grindsted
- Country: Denmark
- Founded: 1984
- League: Danish Super League
- Website: Official Website

Grindsted Speedway Klub is a speedway club, based at the Billund Municipality Stadium, north of Grindsted in Denmark, who compete in the Danish Speedway League. The team have never won the Danish Speedway League but have spent numerous seasons in the highest league tier.

== Venue ==
The club's track known as the Billund Municipality Stadium is located about 6 kilometres in a north east direction from the centre of Grindsted, on Blåbjergvej 1.

== History ==
=== 1985 to 1993 ===
The club was founded in 1985 but initially operated grasstrack speedway only. The following year the professional Danish Speedway League or Superliga was created but Grindsted did not build a full size speedway track until 1990. It took another three years for the club to form a 500cc team, competing in division 2 of the league in 1993.

=== 2007 to present ===
During the 2007 Danish speedway season, the team competed in the top tier of Danish speedway for the first time. The following season in 2008, they signed Rune Holta and Kaj Laukkanen but the team lost their place after the 2009 season when finishing last. They returned in the 2011 season and have remained in the top tier since.

In 2021 the team reached the play offs for the first time and repeated the feat in 2022, led by Kenneth Bjerre.

== Notable riders ==
- (Denmark) Kenneth Bjerre
- (Norway) Rune Holta
- (Finland) Kaj Laukkanen
