= 2023 European Under 23 Team Speedway Championship =

Annual European Under–23 motorcycle speedway competition

The 2023 European Under 23 Team Speedway Championship was the 16th European Under-23 Team Speedway Championship season. It was organised by the Fédération Internationale de Motocyclisme and was the third time that the event had an age limit of under 23 years of age.

The qualifying round was held at the Paul Greifzu Stadium in Stralsund, Germany on 18 May. Sweden won the qualifier with 38 points, the Czech Republic (29), Great Britain (28) and Germany (25) were all eliminated.

The final took place on 22 July 2023 at the Mâcon speedway track in Mâcon, France. The defending champions Poland won again to claim the title for the 13th time.

== Results ==
=== Qualifying Round ===
- Paul Greifzu Stadium, Stralsund, Germany
- 18 May 2023

Pos.	National team	Pts.	Scorers
1	Sweden	38	Anton Karlsson 6, Jonatan Grahn 8, Gustav Grahn 2, Casper Henriksson 10, Philip Hellström-Bängs 12
2	Czech Republic	29	Petr Chlupac 6, Daniel Klima 9, Jaroslav Vaniček 1, Matouš Kamenik 0, Jan Kvech 13
3	Great Britain	28	Tom Brennan 12, Leon Flint 6, Anders Rowe 8, Drew Kemp 1, Daniel Gilkes 1
4	Germany	25	Erik Bachhuber 5, Marius Hillebrand 7, Lukas Baumann 3, Celina Liebmann 0, Norick Blödorn 10

=== Final ===
- Mâcon speedway track, Mâcon, France
- 22 July 2023

Pos.	National team	Pts.	Scorers
1	Poland	45	Bartłomiej Kowalski 12, Wiktor Przyjemski 11,Jakub Miśkowiak 10, Mateusz Cierniak 9, Damian Ratajczak 3
2	Denmark	37	Mads Hansen 10, Tim Sørensen 10, Kevin Juhl Pedersen 7, Jonas Seifert-Salk 5, Emil Breum 5
3	Sweden	27	Casper Henriksson9, Anton Karlsson 8, Jonatan Grahn 6, Noel Wahlquist 4
4	France	13	Mathias Trésarrieu 6, Steven Goret 5, Tino Bouin 2, Théo Ugoni 0

== See also ==
- 2023 World Junior Team Championship
- 2023 Individual Speedway Junior European Championship
