= 2025 Polish speedway season =

2025 season of motorcycle speedway in Poland

The 2025 Polish Speedway season is the 2025 season of motorcycle speedway in Poland. The season will run from early April to late September.

The league system consist of the PGE Ekstralia (tier 1), the Metalkas 2 Ekstraliga (tier 2) and the Polish National Speedway League (tier 3). The winner of the tier 1 will be crowned champions of Poland and winner of the Team Speedway Polish Championship. In 2025, the league remained the leading speedway league in the world.

== Individual ==
=== Polish Individual Speedway Championship ===
The 2025 Polish Individual Speedway Championship (Polish: Indywidualne Mistrzostwa Polski, IMP) was the 2025 version of Polish Individual Speedway Championship organised by the Polish Motor Union (PZM). It was held over three rounds at Toruń, Ostrów and Częstochowa. Patryk Dudek became Polish champion for the second time having previously won the title in 2016.

Pos.	Rider	Club	Total
1	Patryk Dudek	Toruń	47
2	Bartosz Zmarzlik	Lublin	44
3	Dominik Kubera	Lublin	38
4	Kacper Woryna	Częstochowa	33
5	Wiktor Przyjemski	Lublin	33
6	Paweł Przedpełski	Rzeszów	23
7	Szymon Woźniak	Bydgoszcz	23
8	Bartłomiej Kowalski	Wrocław	22
9	Piotr Pawlicki	Częstochowa	16
10	Mateusz Cierniak	Lublin	16
11	Maciej Janowski	Wrocław	16
12	Jakub Miśkowiak	Grudziądz	15
13	Krzysztof Buczkowski	Bydgoszcz	14
14	Przemysław Pawlicki	Zielona Góra	14
15	Gleb Chugunov	Rybnik	10
16	Jakub Krawczyk	Wrocław	6
17	Antoni Kawczyński	Toruń	4
18	Jakub Jamróg	Krosno	2
19	Franciszek Karczewski	Częstochowa	1
19	Mikołaj Duchiński	Toruń	1

=== Golden Helmet ===
The 2025 Golden Helmet organised by the Polish Motor Union (PZM) was the first major event of the 2025 season, with Poland's national coach selecting the participants. Bartosz Zmarzlik won the Golden Helmet for the fourth time and the top four qualified for the 2026 Speedway Grand Prix Qualification.

- Marian Spychała Speedway Stadium, Opole, 21 April 2025

Pos.	Rider	Pts	Total
1	Bartosz Zmarzlik	2, 0, 3, 3, 3	11+3
2	Mateusz Cierniak	2, 2, 3, 3, 1	11+2
3	Dominik Kubera	3, 2, 1, 2, 2	10+3
4	Kacper Woryna	3, 3, 3, Fx, 1	10+2
5	Piotr Pawlicki	1, 1, 2, 2, 3	9
6	Bartłomiej Kowalski	0, 3, 0, 2, 3	8
7	Grzegorz Zengota	0, 3, 1, 1, 3	8
8	Robert Chmiel	2, 0, 3, 1, 2	8
9	Patryk Dudek	X, 2, 1, 3, 2	8
10	Przemysław Pawlicki	3, 1, 1, 0, 2	7
11	Krzysztof Buczkowski	3, 1, 0, 2, R	6
12	Wiktor Przyjemski	1, 0, F, 3, 1	5
13	Janusz Kołodziej	0, 2, 2, 0, 1	5
14	Szymon Woźniak	2, 0, 2, 1, 0	5
15	Jarosław Hampel	1, 3, R, 0, X	4
16	Maciej Janowski	0, 1, 2, 1, 0	4
17	Oskar Fajfer (res)	1	1
18	Oskar Paluch (res)	0	0

=== Criterium of Aces ===
The Mieczysław Połukard Criterium of Aces

- Polonia Bydgoszcz Stadium, Bydgoszcz, 30 March 2025

Pos.	Rider	Total
1	(Ukraine) Aleksandr Łoktaev	12
2	Krzysztof Buczkowski	11
3	(Denmark) Mikkel Michelsen	11
4	Szymon Woźniak	10
5	Bartosz Zmarzlik	10
6	(Russia) Emil Sayfutdinov	9
7	(Germany) Kai Huckenbeck	9
8	Patryk Dudek	8
9	(Latvia) Andzejs Lebedevs	8
10	Dominik Kubera	7
11	(Russia) Artem Laguta	6
12	(England) Tom Brennan	6
13	(Australia) Max Fricke	6
14	Wiktor Przyjemski	3
15	Robert Chmiel	3
16	(Australia) Jason Doyle	2

=== Polish U21 Championship ===
The Polish U21 Championship was held at Józef Piłsudski Stadium (Bydgoszcz) on 14 August and was won by Wiktor Przyjemski.

=== Silver Helmet ===
The Silver Helmet was held at the Stadion OSiR Skałka in Świętochłowice on 12 May. The event was won by Wiktor Przyjemski.

=== Bronze Helmet ===
The Bronze Helmet was held on 23 April at the MOSiR Stadium (Krosno). The event was won by Franciszek Karczewski.

== Pairs ==
The 2025 Polish Pairs Speedway Championship (Polish: Mistrzostwa Polski par klubowych na żużlu) is the 2025 edition of the Polish Pairs Speedway Championship. The event was held at the Grudziądz Speedway Stadium on 5 April.

Pos	Team	Riders	Pts
1	Lublin	Bartosz Zmarzlik 14+3, Dominik Kubera 8	22+3
2	Grudziądz	Michael Jepsen Jensen 14+2, Vadim Tarasenko 8	22+2
3	Toruń	Robert Lambert 12, Emil Sayfutdinov 8, Patryk Dudek 1	21
4	Wrocław	Maciej Janowski 9, Artem Laguta 6, Dan Bewley 5	20
5	Częstochowa	Piotr Pawlicki 11, Kacper Woryna 4	15
6	Gorzów	Oskar Paluch 7, Martin Vaculík 5, Oskar Fajfer 2	14
7	Rybnik	Gleb Chugunov 6, Chris Holder 5, Maksym Drabik 1	12

== Team ==
The 2025 Team Speedway Polish Championship (Polish: Drużynowe mistrzostwa Polski na żużlu) is the 2025 edition of the Team Polish Championship to determine the gold medal winner (champion of Poland). Teams finishing second and third were awarded silver and bronze medals respectively.

=== Ekstraliga ===
The Ekstraliga season runs from 11 April to 28 September.

Pos	Team	P	W	D	L	BP	Pts
1	Lublin	14	13	0	1	7	33
2	Wrocław	14	10	0	4	6	26
3	Toruń	14	10	1	3	5	26
4	Grudziądz	14	7	0	7	4	18
5	Zielona Góra	14	6	0	8	3	15
6	Gorzów	14	4	1	9	1	10
7	Częstochowa	14	3	0	11	1	7
8	Rybnik	14	2	0	12	0	4

Semi-finals

Team 1	Team 2	Score
Toruń	Wrocław	52–38, 43–47
Grudziądz	Lublin	43–47, 40–50

Third place

Team 1	Team 2	Score
Wrocław	Grudziądz	61–29, 44–46

Final

21 September	KS Toruń; Patryk Dudek 13; Mikkel Michelsen 10; Emil Sayfutdinov 9 Robert Lambert 8 Antoni Kawczyński 5 Jan Kvěch 5 Mikołaj Duchiński 4	54–36	Motor Lublin; Bartosz Zmarzlik 13; Dominik Kubera 10; Jack Holder 5 Fredrik Lindgren 3 Wiktor Przyjemski 2 Mateusz Cierniak 2 Bartosz Bańbor 1	MotoArena Toruń

28 September	Motor Lublin; Bartosz Zmarzlik 12; Mateusz Cierniak 9 Jack Holder 8 Fredrik Lindgren 8 Wiktor Przyjemski 6 Bartosz Bańbor 5 Dominik Kubera 4	52–38	KS Toruń; Patryk Dudek 12; Mikkel Michelsen 10; Emil Sayfutdinov 8 Robert Lambert 6 Jan Kvěch 1 Antoni Kawczyński 1 Mikołaj Duchiński 0	MOSiR Stadium (Bystrzyca)

Leading averages

	Rider	Team	Average
1	(Poland) Bartosz Zmarzlik	Lublin	10.57
2	(Poland) Patryk Dudek	Toruń	9.45
3	(Russia) / (Poland) Artem Laguta	Wrocław	8.94
4	(Australia) Brady Kurtz	Wrocław	8.87
5	(Denmark) Michael Jepsen Jensen	Grudziądz	8.82
6	(Poland) Piotr Pawlicki	Częstochowa	8.71
7	(Denmark) Leon Madsen	Zielona Góra	8.69
=8	(Poland) Wiktor Przyjemski	Lublin	8.60
=8	(Denmark) Mikkel Michelsen	Toruń	8.60
10	(Australia) Jack Holder	Lublin	8.58

=== Ekstraliga 2 ===
The Ekstraliga 2 fixtures will run from 12 April to 20 September.

Pos	Team	P	W	D	L	BP	Pts
1	Leszno	14	13	0	1	7	33
2	Bydgoszcz	14	11	0	3	6	28
3	Krosno	14	8	1	5	4	21
4	Rzeszów	14	7	1	6	3	18
5	Poznań	14	4	5	5	4	17
6	Łódź	14	3	1	10	2	9
7	Ostrów	14	3	1	10	1	8
8	Tarnów	14	2	1	11	1	6

Semi-finals

Team 1	Team 2	Score
Rzeszów	Leszno	44–43, 35–54
Krosno	Bydgoszcz	41–49, 25–65

Final

Team 1	Team 2	Score
Bydgoszcz	Leszno	45–45, 40-50

Leading averages

	Rider	Team	Average
1	(Poland) Janusz Kołodziej	Leszno	9.98
2	(Australia) Ben Cook	Leszno	9.21
3	(Australia) Ryan Douglas	Poznan	9.07
=4	(Poland) Szymon Woźniak	Bydgoszcz	8.92
=4	(Germany) Kai Huckenbeck	Bydgoszcz	8.92
6	(Poland) Paweł Przedpełski	Rzeszów	8.87
7	(United States) Luke Becker	Ostrów	8.74
8	(Ukraine) Aleksandr Loktaev	Bydgoszcz	8.73
9	(Poland) Krzysztof Buczkowski	Bydgoszcz	8.58
10	(Poland) Grzegorz Zengota	Leszno	8.39

=== National League ===
The National League consisted of seven teams. There was still no return for Kolejarz Rawicz but Kraków Speedway returned following a five year absence.

Pos	Team	P	W	D	L	BP	Pts
1	Gdańsk	12	11	0	1	6	28
2	Gniezno	12	9	0	3	5	23
3	Piła	12	8	0	4	4	20
4	Daugavpils (Latvia)	12	6	0	6	3	15
5	Landshut (Germany)	12	4	0	8	2	10
6	Opole	12	2	0	10	1	5
7	Kraków	12	2	0	10	0	4

Semi-finals

Team 1	Team 2	Score
Daugavpils	Gdańsk	40–44, 30–60
Piła	Gniezno	53–37, 45–45

Final

Team 1	Team 2	Score
Piła	Gdańsk	49-41, 52–38

Leading averages

	Rider	Team	Average
1	(Denmark) Niels Kristian Iversen	Gdańsk	9.89
2	(Australia) Sam Masters	Gniezno	9.21
3	(Denmark) Benjamin Basso	Gdańsk	9.20
4	(Poland) Wiktor Jasiński	Piła	9.02
5	(Denmark) Tim Sørensen	Gdańsk	8.64
6	(Denmark) Villads Nagel	Piła	8.54
7	(Latvia) Jevgeņijs Kostigovs	Daugavpils	8.52
8	(Denmark) Bastian Pedersen	Gniezno	8.51
=9	(Sweden) Kim Nilsson	Landshut	8.49
=9	(Poland) Oskar Polis	Opole	8.49

=== Ekstraliga U24 ===
The Ekstraliga U24 season will run from 29 April to 16 September.

Pos	Team	P	W	D	L	BP	Pts
1	Wrocław	16	11	1	4	6	29
2	Toruń	16	11	0	5	5	27
3	Leszno	16	10	1	5	6	27
4	Lublin	16	10	1	5	5	26
5	Częstochowa	16	9	0	7	5	23
6	Zielona Góra	16	8	0	8	4	20
7	Rybnik	16	5	0	11	2	12
8	Grudziądz	16	3	0	13	2	8
9	Gorzów	16	3	1	12	1	8

Final

Team 1	Team 2	Score
Toruń	Wrocław	40–49, 32-58

== Squads ==
=== Ekstraliga ===
Częstochowa

- (Australia) Jason Doyle
- (Poland) Kacper Halkiewicz
- (Denmark) Mads Hansen
- (Sweden) Philip Hellström Bängs
- (Poland) Wiktor Lampart
- (Poland) Szymon Ludwiczak
- (Poland) Franciszek Karczewski
- (Poland) Piotr Pawlicki Jr.
- (Poland) Mateusz Świdnicki
- (Poland) Kacper Woryna

Gorzów

- (Czech Republic) Adam Bednář
- (Poland) Oskar Chatłas
- (Poland) Oskar Fajfer
- (Latvia) Andžejs Ļebedevs
- (Poland) Hubert Jabłoński
- (Poland) Mikołaj Krok
- (Poland) Oskar Paluch
- (Denmark) Anders Thomsen
- (Slovakia) Martin Vaculík

Grudziądz

- (Australia) Max Fricke
- (Denmark) Michael Jepsen Jensen
- (Australia) Jaimon Lidsey
- (Poland) Kacper Łobodziński
- (Poland) Kevin Małkiewicz
- (Poland) Damian Miller
- (Poland) Jakub Miśkowiak
- (Poland) Jan Przanowski
- (Poland) Kacper Szarszewski
- (Russia) / (Poland) Vadim Tarasenko
- (Poland) Kacper Warduliński

Lublin

- (Poland) Bartosz Bańbor
- (Poland) Mateusz Cierniak
- (Australia) Jack Holder
- (Poland) Bartosz Jaworski
- (Poland) Dominik Kubera
- (Sweden) Fredrik Lindgren
- (Poland) Wiktor Przyjemski
- (Poland) Bartosz Zmarzlik

Rybnik

- (Poland) Maksym Borowiak
- (Russia) / (Poland) Gleb Chugunov
- (Poland) Maksym Drabik
- (Australia) Chris Holder
- (Denmark) Jesper Knudsen
- (Denmark) Nicki Pedersen
- (Poland) Kacper Pludra
- (Poland) Kacper Tkocz
- (Poland) Pawel Trześniewski
- (Australia) Rohan Tungate
- (Poland) Kamil Winkler
- (Poland) Pawel Wyczyszczok

Toruń

- (Poland) Mikołaj Duchiński
- (Poland) Patryk Dudek
- (Poland) Kacper Grzelak
- (Poland) Antoni Kawczyński
- (Czech Republic) Jan Kvěch
- (England) Robert Lambert
- (Poland) Krzysztof Lewandowski
- (Denmark) Mikkel Michelsen
- (Poland) Oskar Rumiński
- (Russia) / (Poland) Emil Sayfutdinov

Wrocław

- (Denmark) Mikkel Andersen
- (England) Dan Bewley
- (Poland) Maciej Janowski
- (Poland) Bartłomiej Kowalski
- (Poland) Marcel Kowolik
- (Australia) Brady Kurtz
- (Poland) Jakub Krawczyk
- (Russia) / (Poland) Artem Laguta
- (Poland) Nikodem Mikołajczyk
- (Poland) Filip Seniuk

Zielona Góra

- (Poland) Michał Curzytek
- (Poland) Jarosław Hampel
- (Poland) Oskar Hurysz
- (Denmark) Rasmus Jensen
- (Denmark) Jonas Knudsen
- (Poland) Mateusz Łopuski
- (Denmark) Leon Madsen
- (Australia) Mitchell McDiarmid
- (Poland) Przemysław Pawlicki
- (Poland) Damian Ratajczak

=== Ekstraliga 2 ===
Bydgoszcz

- (Poland) Kacper Andrzejewski
- (England) Tom Brennan
- (Poland) Krzysztof Buczkowski
- (Germany) Kai Huckenbeck
- (Ukraine) Aleksandr Loktaev
- (Poland) Emil Maroszek
- (Poland) Bartosz Nowak
- (Poland) Maksymilian Pawelczak
- (Poland) Adam Putkowski
- (Poland) Szymon Woźniak

Krosno

- (Poland) Szymon Bandur
- (France) Dimitri Bergé
- (Denmark) Kenneth Bjerre
- (Denmark) William Drejer
- (Poland) Miłosz Grygolec
- (Poland) Jakub Jamróg
- (Hungary) Zoltán Lovas
- (Poland) Tobiasz Musielak
- (Norway) Mathias Pollestad
- (Poland) Krzysztof Sadurski
- (Poland) Piotr Świercz
- (Poland) Jakub Wieszczak

Leszno

- (Australia) Ben Cook
- (Poland) Hubert Jabłoński
- (Poland) Janusz Kołodziej
- (Poland) Kacper Mania
- (Poland) Antoni Mencel
- (Ukraine) Nazar Parnitskyi
- (Australia) Josh Pickering
- (Poland) Grzegorz Zengota
- (Australia) Tate Zischke
- (Poland) Jakub Żurek

Łódź

- (Denmark) Mikkel Andersen
- (Poland) Mateusz Bartkowiak
- (Poland) Oliver Buszkiewicz
- (Poland) Robert Chmeil
- (Denmark) Patrick Hansen
- (Poland) Jakub Kicińsk
- (Poland) Andreas Lyager
- (Czech Republic) Václav Milík
- (Poland) Seweryn Orgacki
- (Poland) Tomasz Szeląg
- (Poland) Patryk Wojdyło

Ostrów

- (United States) Luke Becker
- (Sweden) Oliver Berntzon
- (Poland) Franciszek Dymowsk
- (Poland) Norbert Krakowiak
- (Denmark) Frederik Jakobsen
- (Poland) Tobiasz Potasznik
- (England) Anders Rowe
- (Poland) Filip Seniuk
- (Poland) Pawel Sitek
- (Poland) Gracjan Szostak
- (Poland) Sebastian Szostak
- (Poland) Grzegorz Walasek

Poznań

- (Poland) Mateusz Affelt
- (Germany) Norick Blödorn
- (Poland) Mikołaj Czapla
- (Australia) Ryan Douglas
- (Latvia) Francis Gusts
- (Poland) Mateusz Latała
- (Poland) Tobias J Musielak
- (Denmark) Matias Nielsen
- (Poland) Bartosz Smektała
- (Poland) Szymon Szlauderbach
- (Poland) Kacper Teska
- (Poland) Kamil Witkowski

Rzeszów

- (France) David Bellego
- (Slovenia) Anže Grmek
- (Poland) Kryspin Jarosz
- (Denmark) Nicolai Klindt
- (Poland) Franciszek Majewski
- (Poland) Marcin Nowak
- (Poland) Paweł Przedpełski
- (Poland) Wiktor Rafalski
- (Australia) Keynan Rew
- (Sweden) Jacob Thorssell
- (England) Tai Woffinden

Tarnów

- (Australia) Fraser Bowes
- (Poland) Igor Gryzło
- (Poland) Jan Heleniak
- (Sweden) Timo Lahti
- (Poland) Radosław Kowalski
- (Ukraine) Marko Levishyn
- (Poland) Sebastian Madej
- (Poland) Mateusz Szczepaniak
- (Slovenia) Matej Žagar

=== National League ===
Daugavpils

- (Denmark) Emil Breum
- (Latvia) Damir Filimonovs
- (Sweden) Filip Hjelmland
- (Latvia) Artjoms Juhno
- (Latvia) Nikita Kaulin
- (Latvia) Daniils Kolodinskis
- (Latvia) Jevgeņijs Kostigovs
- (Latvia) Oļegs Mihailovs
- (Latvia) Kjasts Puodžuks
- (Australia) Justin Sedgmen

Gdańsk

- (Denmark) Benjamin Basso
- (Denmark) Marcus Birkemose
- (Poland) Jędrzej Chmura
- (Poland) Kacper Mateusz Grzelak
- (Denmark) Niels Kristian Iversen
- (Poland) Daniel Kaczmarek
- (Poland) Eryk Kaminski
- (Poland) Jakub Malina
- (Poland) Krystian Pieszczek
- (Denmark) Tim Sørensen
- (Poland) Bartosz Tyburski
- (Poland) Miłosz Wysocki

Gniezno

- (Poland) Patryk Budniak
- (United Kingdom) Adam Ellis
- (Poland) Kevin Fajfer
- (Poland) Adrian Gała
- (Sweden) Casper Henriksson
- (Poland) Marcel Juskowiak
- (Australia) Sam Masters
- (Poland) Jakub Oleksiak
- (Denmark) Bastian Pedersen
- (Poland) Robert Roszak
- (Poland) Adrian Saks
- (Poland) Ksawery Słomski

Kraków

- (Poland) Miłosz Duda
- (Poland) Dawid Grzeszczyk
- (Slovenia) Matic Ivačič
- (Denmark) Jonas Jeppesen
- (England) Richard Lawson
- (Latvia) Ernest Matjuszonok
- (Poland) Artur Mroczka
- (Finland) Jesse Mustonen
- (Poland) Dawid Rempala
- (Poland) Bartosz Szymura

Landshut

- (Italy) Paco Castagna
- (England) Leon Flint
- (Germany) Valentin Grobauer
- (Germany) Mario Häusl
- (Germany) Marlon Hegner
- (Germany) Marius Hillebrand
- (Germany) Ben Iken
- (Sweden) Kim Nilsson
- (Denmark) Kevin Juhl Pedersen
- (Germany) Erik Riss
- (Germany) Kevin Wölbert
- (England) Charles Wright

Opole

- (Poland) Jakub Fabisz
- (Poland) Dastin Łukaszczyk
- (Ukraine) Stanisław Mielniczuk
- (Poland) Hubert Łęgowik
- (Australia) James Pearson
- (Poland) Oskar Polis
- (Poland) Kacper Siadak
- (Poland) Lars Skupień
- (Poland) Oskar Stępień
- (Sweden) Mathias Thörnblom
- (Poland) Grzegorz Walasek

Piła

- (Poland) Denis Andrzejczak
- (Poland) Adrian Cyfer
- (Poland) Tomasz Gapiński
- (Poland) Hubert Gasior
- (Poland) Norbert Kościuch
- (Denmark) Villads Nagel
- (Poland) Krzyzstof Sadurski
- (Denmark) Jonas Seifert-Salk
- (Poland) Jakub Zurek
