= 2023 European Team Speedway Championship =

European motorcycle speedway competition

European Team Speedway Championship

The 2023 European Team Speedway Championship was the second edition of the European motorcycle speedway team event to determine the team champions of Europe.

Poland successfully defended their title.

== Semi final A ==
- 15 April, Gdańsk, Poland

| Position | Team | Points | Riders |
|---|---|---|---|
| 1 | Poland | 42 | Szymon Wozniak 12; Jarosław Hampel 11; Dominik Kubera 10; Wictor Przyjemski 5 Jakub Miśkowiak 4 |
| 2 | Sweden | 31 | Freddie Lindgren 11; Jacob Thorssell 8 Antonio Lindbäck 7 Oliver Berntzon 5 Philip Hellström Bängs 0 |
| 3 | France | 24 | David Bellego 13; Dimitri Bergé 9 Mathieu Trésarrieu 1 Steven Goret 1 Mathias Trésarrieu 0 |
| 4 | Latvia | 23 | Andžejs Ļebedevs 11; Jevgeņijs Kostigovs 5 Francis Gusts 4 Oļegs Mihailovs 3 Daniils Kolodinskis 0 |

== Semi final B ==
- 16 April, Pardubice, Czech Republic

| Position | Team | Points | Riders |
|---|---|---|---|
| 1 | Denmark | 49 | Rasmus Jensen 13; Frederik Jakobsen 13; Mikkel Michelsen 11; Andreas Lyager 10; Emil Breum 2 |
| 2 | (United Kingdom) Great Britain | 33 | Dan Bewley 14; Adam Ellis 8 Tom Brennan 8 Richie Worrall 3 |
| 3 | Czech Republic | 32 | Václav Milík 16; Eduard Krčmář 9 Jan Kvěch 6 Daniel Klíma 1 Petr Chlupáč 0 |
| 4 | Ukraine | 6 | Marko Levishyn 4 Nazar Parnitskyi 2 Vitalii Lysak 0 Stanislav Ogorodnik 0 Nazar Fedorchuk 0 |

== Final ==
- 22 April, Paul Greifzu Stadium, Stralsund, Germany

| Position | Team | Points | Riders |
|---|---|---|---|
| 1 | Poland | 49 | Bartosz Zmarzlik 13; Szymon Wozniak 13; Dominik Kubera 12; Jarosław Hampel 11 |
| 2 | Denmark | 35 | Mikkel Michelsen 12; Rasmus Jensen 9 Frederik Jakobsen 9 Andreas Lyager 5 Emil Breum 0 |
| 3 | (United Kingdom) Great Britain | 22 | Dan Bewley 11; Adam Ellis 5 Tom Brennan 4 Richie Worrall 2 Daniel Gilkes 0 |
| 4 | Germany | 14 | Kai Huckenbeck 8 Norick Blödorn 6 Martin Smolinski 0 Erik Riss 0 Erik Bachhuber 0 |
