= 2025 Speedway Grand Prix Qualification =

World speedway event

Speedway Grand Prix Qualification
- Dates: 20 May to 4 Oct 2024

The 2025 Individual Speedway World Championship Grand Prix Qualification or GP Challenge was a series of motorcycle speedway meetings held during 2024 to determine the riders that qualified for the 2025 Speedway Grand Prix. The series consisted of four qualifying rounds at Abensberg, Debrecen, Lonigo and Žarnovica and the Grand Prix Challenge at Pardubice. Preliminary qualification events included the Grand Prix qualifier in Denmark.

The four riders that qualified were Brady Kurtz, Anders Thomsen, Dominik Kubera and Max Fricke. These riders progressed to the 2025 Speedway Grand Prix, where they were joined by the riders who finished in the leading positions of the 2024 Speedway Grand Prix. There will be four places to gain via this year's Grand Prix Challenge.

== National Qualifying Events ==
=== Australian Championship ===
Source:

=== FIM Oceania Championship ===
Source:

== FIM Qualifying rounds ==
=== Round One ===
- 20 May 2024
- (Germany) Abensberg (Wack Hofmeister Stadium)

Pos.	Rider	Points	Details
1	(Germany) Kai Huckenbeck	14	(3,3,3,3,2)
2	(Denmark) Rasmus Jensen	13+3	(3,3,2,2,3)
3	(Poland) Dominik Kubera	13+2	(1,3,3,3,3)
4	(Australia) Max Fricke	13+1	(3,2,2,3,3)
5	(United Kingdom) Tom Brennan	10	(2,2,3,1,2)
6	(Sweden) Kim Nilsson	9	(2,R,1,3,3)
7	(Germany) Martin Smolinski	9	(2,2,2,1,2)
8	(Finland) Jesse Mustonen	8	(1,3,0,2,2)
9	(United Kingdom) Leon Flint	8	(2,2,1,2,1)
10	(Italy) Nicolás Covatti	5	(3,R,2,R,-)
11	(Norway) Glenn Moi	5	(1,1,0,2,1)
12	(Czech Republic) Daniel Klíma	4	(0,0,3,0,1)
13	(Germany) Valentin Grobauer	4	(1,1,1,R,1)
14	(Ukraine) Andriy Rozaliuk	3	(0,1,1,1,0)
15	(France) Mathias Trésarrieu	1	(0,R,D,1,0)
16	(Germany) Julian Kuny	0	(D,0,0,0,F)
17	(Germany) Sandro Wassermann	0	(-,-,-,-,0)

=== Round Three ===
- 25 May 2024
- (Slovakia) Žarnovica (Speedway stadium Žarnovica)

Pos.	Rider	Points	Details
1	(Denmark) Anders Thomsen	14	(3,3,3,2,3)
2	(Poland) Patryk Dudek	13	(2,3,3,3,2)
3	(Australia) Brady Kurtz	12+3	(1,3,2,3,3)
4	(United Kingdom) Robert Lambert	12+2	(3,2,3,1,3)
5	(Slovakia) Martin Vaculík	10	(3,1,R,3,3)
6	(United States) Luke Becker	10	(3,2,0,3,2)
7	(Sweden) Oliver Berntzon	9	(2,3,2,2,0)
8	(Czech Republic) Václav Milík	9	(2,1,2,2,2)
9	(Czech Republic) Adam Bednář	6	(R,F,3,1,2)
10	(Slovenia) Matic Ivačič	6	(1,2,2,0,1)
11	(Latvia) Jevgeņijs Kostigovs	5	(2,0,0,2,1)
12	(Germany) Norick Blödorn	5	(0,2,1,1,1)
13	(Finland) Antti Vuolas	3	(0,1,1,0,1)
14	(Ukraine) Andriy Karpov	3	(1,T,1,1,R)
15	(Slovakia) Jakub Valković	1	(1,0,0,0,0)
16	(Romania) Andrei Popa	1	(0,0,1,R,0)
17	(Czech Republic) Jan Jeníček	1	(-,0,-,-,-)

=== Round Two ===
- 20 May 2024
- (Hungary) Debrecen (Debrecen Speedway Stadium)

Pos.	Rider	Points	Details
1	(Poland) Przemysław Pawlicki	14	(3,3,3,3,2)
2	(Sweden) Antonio Lindbäck	13	(2,2,3,3,3)
3	(Latvia) Andžejs Ļebedevs	12+3	(1,3,3,3,2)
4	(Poland) Kacper Woryna	12+2	(3,1,3,2,3)
5	(Denmark) Frederik Jakobsen	12+1	(2,3,2,2,3)
6	(Sweden) Jacob Thorssell	11	(0,3,2,3,3)
7	(Ukraine) Stanislav Melnychuk	9	(3,1,1,2,2)
8	(Denmark) Benjamin Basso	8	(2,2,2,1,1)
10	(Australia) Rohan Tungate	6	(3,R,2,R,1)
9	(United Kingdom) Adam Ellis	6	(1,2,1,2,0)
11	(United States) Gino Manzares	6	(2,1,1,1,1)
12	(Czech Republic) Jan Macek	4	(1,2,0,1,R)
13	(Germany) Marius Hillebrand	3	(0,0,1,R,2)
14	(Hungary) Norbert Magosi	3	(1,1,0,0,1)
15	(Slovenia) Denis Štojs	1	(0,0,0,1,0)
16	(Hungary) Roland Kovacs	0	(0,R,-,-,-)
17	(Hungary) Richard Füzesi	0	(-,-,0,R,0)

=== Round Four ===
- 25 May 2024
- (Italy) Lonigo (Santa Marina Stadium)

Pos.	Rider	Points	Details
1	(Czech Republic) Jan Kvěch	14	(3,3,2,3,3)
2	(United Kingdom) Dan Bewley	13	(3,2,3,2,3)
3	(Australia) Jack Holder	12+3	(2,2,3,3,2)
4	(Italy) Michele Paco Castagna	12+D	(3,3,3,1,2)
5	(Australia) Jaimon Lidsey	11	(2,3,2,1,3)
6	(Germany) Kevin Wölbert	10	(2,0,2,3,3)
7	(Poland) Szymon Woźniak	9	(3,2,D,2,2)
8	(Finland) Timo Lahti	8	(2,2,3,R,1)
9	(Latvia) Francis Gusts	8	(1,3,1,2,1)
10	(Denmark) Andreas Lyager	6	(1,1,1,3,0)
11	(Italy) Nicolas Vicentin	4	(1,1,D,2,D)
12	(Italy) Niccolò Percotti	3	(0,1,R,0,2)
13	(Argentina) Cristian Zubillaga	3	(D,0,2,0,1)
14	(Argentina) Carlos Eber Ampugnani	2	(0,R,R,1,1)
15	(Slovenia) Anže Grmek	1	(0,1,D,0,D)
16	(Italy) Matteo Boncinelli	1	(-.-,-,1,0)
17	(France) Tino Bouin	0	(R,D,R,-,-)

== 2024 Speedway Grand Prix Challenge ==
=== Grand Prix Challenge ===
- 4 October 2024
- (Czech Republic) Pardubice (Svítkov Stadium)

Pos.	Rider	Points	Total
1	(Australia) Brady Kurtz	13	(3,3,3,2,2)
2	(Denmark) Anders Thomsen	12	(2,1,3,3,3)
3	(Poland) Dominik Kubera	11	(3,3,1,3,1)
4	(Australia) Max Fricke	11	(2,3,2,1,3)
5	(Sweden) Jacob Thorssell	10	(3,3,2,0,2)
6	(Germany) Kevin Wölbert	8	(0,2,1,3,2)
7	(Poland) Przemysław Pawlicki	8	(2,2,0,2,2)
8	(Poland) Kacper Woryna	7	(0,W,1,3,3)
9	(Czech Republic) Jan Kvěch	6	(2,1,0,3,0)
10	(Denmark) Frederik Jakobsen	6	(2,1,W,0,3)
11	(Poland) Patryk Dudek	6	(1,0,3,1,1)
12	(Denmark) Rasmus Jensen	6	(1,2,0,2,1)
13	(Germany) Kai Huckenbeck	5	(3,0,2,W,W)
14	(Australia) Jaimon Lidsey	4	(0,0,1,2,1)
15	(United Kingdom) Tom Brennan	4	(1,1,1,1,0)
16	(Italy) Michele Paco Castagna	3	(0,1,2,0,-)
17	(Czech Republic) Jan Macek	0	(-,-,-,-,0)

Fredrik Jakobsen, Jaimon Lidsey, Tom Brennan and Jacob Thorssell replaced Dan Bewley, Robert Lambert, Jack Holder and Andžejs Ļebedevs, who all secured qualification for the 2025 Speedway Grand Prix ahead of the Grand Prix Challenge being staged. Antonio Lindbäck also pulled out and was replaced by Kevin Wölbert.
