= 2024 European Team Speedway Championship =

European motorcycle speedway competition

- Start date: 30 March
- End date: 6 April

The 2024 European Team Speedway Championship was the third edition of the European motorcycle speedway team event to determine the team champions of Europe.

Poland with home advantage for the second time in three years, justified their tag of strong favourites once again by winning comfortably ahead of Denmark. The other two finalists Sweden and the Czech Republic were outclassed. Great Britain, who challenged Poland for the 2023 World Cup crown chose not to compete in the competition.

== Semi final A ==
- (Czech Republic) Svítkov Stadium, Pardubice, 30 March

Position	Team	Points	Riders
1	Denmark	49	Mads Hansen 14; Rasmus Jensen 12; Mikkel Michelsen 11; Anders Thomsen 8 Bastian Pedersen 4
2	Czech Republic	33	Václav Milík 12; Jan Kvěch 10; Adam Bednář 9 Daniel Klíma 1 Jan Macek 1
3	Norway	23	Mathias Pollestad 12; Truls Kamhaug 4 Lasse Fredriksen 4 Glenn Moi 3
4	Slovenia	15	Matic Ivačič 10; Anže Grmek 5 Luka Omerzel 0

== Semi final B ==
- (Poland) Zbigniew Podlecki Stadium, Gdańsk, 30 March

Position	Team	Points	Riders
1	Sweden	42	Kim Nilsson 13; Jacob Thorssell 11; Freddie Lindgren 10; Antonio Lindbäck 7 Casper Henriksson 1
2	Latvia	31	Andžejs Ļebedevs 11; Jevgeņijs Kostigovs 9 Daniils Kolodinskis 8 Francis Gusts 2 Oļegs Mihailovs 0
3	Germany	27	Erik Riss 9 Norick Blödorn; Kevin Wölbert 5 Valentin Grobauer 4 Sandro Wassermann 1
4	Ukraine	19	Stanislav Melnychuk 8 Marko Levishyn 6 Andriy Karpov 3 Nazar Parnitskyi 2 Vitaliy Lysak dnr

== Final ==
- (Poland) Grudziądz Speedway Stadium, Grudziądz, 6 April

Position	Team	Points	Riders
1	Poland	51	Patryk Dudek 14; Bartosz Zmarzlik 13; Piotr Pawlicki Jr. 13; Przemysław Pawlicki 10; Wiktor Przyjemski
2	Denmark	35	Anders Thomsen 14; Mikkel Michelsen 9 Rasmus Jensen 7 Mads Hansen 5 Bastian Pedersen dnr
3	Sweden	20	Freddie Lindgren 10; Antonio Lindbäck 4 Kim Nilsson 4 Jacob Thorssell 2 Casper Henriksson 0
4	Czech Republic	13	Václav Milík 5 Jan Kvěch 5 Daniel Klíma 2 Adam Bednář 1 Jan Macek 0

== See also ==
- 2024 Speedway European Championship
- 2024 European Pairs Speedway Championship
