= 2020 Individual Speedway Junior European Championship =

Motorcycle racing competition

The 2020 European Individual Speedway Junior Championship (also known as the 2020 Speedway European Under 21 Championship) was the 23rd edition of the Championship. It was the last U21 final because from 2021 the age limit was changed to U19 which would become the sole Junior championship.

The U21 final was staged at Gdańsk in Poland and was won by Wiktor Lampart of Poland.

The U19 final was staged at Žarnovica in Slovakia and was won by Jan Kvěch of the Czech Republic for the second successive year.

== Under 21 ==
=== Final ===
- 9 October 2020
- (Poland) Gdańsk

| Pos. | Rider | Points | Details |
|---|---|---|---|
| 1 | (Denmark) Marcus Birkemose | 13 | (3, 2, 3, 3, 2) |
| 2 | (Poland) Jakub Miśkowiak | 12 | (2, 3, 2, 2, 3) |
| 3 | (Sweden) Alexander Woentin | 11 | (3, 1, 2, 2, 3) |
| 4 | (Germany) Lukas Fienhage | 10 | (2, 3, 3, X, 2) |
| 5 | (Sweden) Jonatan Grahn | 10 | (3, 2, 1, 2, 2) |
| 6 | (Poland) Mateusz Cierniak | 9 | (R, 2, 3, 1, 3) |
| 7 | (Czech Republic) Petr Chlupáč | 9 | (3, 2, 3, 1, X) |
| 8 | (Germany) Norick Blödorn | 9 | (1, 3, 1, 3, 1) |
| 9 | (Denmark) Mads Hansen | 8 | (2, 3, 0, 3, 0) |
| 10 | (Czech Republic) Daniel Klíma | 8 | (1, 0, 2, 2, 3) |
| 11 | (Ukraine) Marko Levishyn | 6 | (2, 1, 1, 0, 2) |
| 12 | (United Kingdom) Tom Brennan | 4 | (0, 0, 0, 3, 1) |
| 13 | (Finland) Timi Salonen | 4 | (0, 1, 2, 1, R) |
| 14 | (Poland) Mateusz Świdnicki | 3 | (X, 0, 1, 1, 1) |
| 15 | (Slovakia) David Pacalaj | 1 | (1, 0, 0, 0, R) |
| 16 | (Ukraine) Andriej Rozaliuk | 1 | (0, 1, 0, 0, R) |
| 17 | (Poland) Karol Zupinski (res) | 1 | (1) |

== Under 19 ==
=== Final ===
- 16 August 2020
- (Slovakia) Žarnovica

| Pos. | Rider | Points | Details |
|---|---|---|---|
| 1 | (Czech Republic) Jan Kvěch | 14 | (3,3,2,3,3) |
| 2 | (Denmark) Marcus Birkemose | 12 | (3,3,3,3,u) |
| 3 | (Czech Republic) Daniel Klíma | 10+3 | (2,1,1,3,3) |
| 4 | (Denmark) Esben Hjerrild | 10+2 | (3,3,2,2,w) |
| 5 | (Czech Republic) Petr Chlupáč | 9 | (3,0,3,1,2) |
| 6 | (Latvia) Ričards Ansviesulis | 9 | (2,in,3,3,1) |
| 7 | (Russia) Aleksandr Kaibushev | 7 | (0,d,3,1,3) |
| 8 | (Latvia) Ernest Matjuszonok | 7 | (1,3,1,d,2) |
| 9 | (Poland) Mateusz Cierniak | 7 | (1,1,d,2,3) |
| 10 | (France) Steven Goret | 7 | (2,2,0,1,2) |
| 11 | (England) Jordan Palin | 7 | (1,2,2,1,1) |
| 12 | (England) Drew Kemp | 5 | (w,2,1,2,0) |
| 13 | (Denmark) Benjamin Basso | 5 | (1,2,2,-,-) |
| 14 | (Slovakia) David Pacalaj | 3 | (0,d,1,d,2) |
| 15 | (Latvia) Francis Gusts | 2 | (2,d,0,w,-) |
| 16 | (Poland) Krzysztof Sadurski | 2 | (0,2,d,-,-) |
| 17 | (Germany) Ben Ernst | 2 | (1,0,1,0) |
| 18 | (Germany) Norick Blödorn | 1 | (0,1,d,-,-) |

== See also ==
- 2020 Speedway European Championship
