= 2024 European Pairs Speedway Championship =

Motorcycle speedway event

The 2024 European Pairs Speedway Championship was the 21st edition of the European Pairs Speedway Championship. The final was held at the Santa Marina Stadium in Lonigo, Italy, on 20 October.

The qualifier was held at the Paul Greifzu Stadium in Stralsund, Germany on 10 August, which resulted in a win for Germany on 27 points followed by Great Britain (25), Czech Republic (24), Slovenia (17), Sweden (16), Norway (11) and Ukraine (4).

In the final, Denmark won the event for the second time.

== Final ==
- Santa Marina Stadium in Lonigo, Italy, on 20 October 2024

Position	team	Points	Riders
1	Denmark	27	Rasmus Jensen 17, Frederik Jakobsen 10
2	Poland	23	Mateusz Cierniak 12, Bartłomiej Kowalski 11
3	(United Kingdom) Great Britain	23	Tom Brennan 16, Leon Flint 5, Dan Thompson 2
4	Finland	15	Jesse Mustonen 11, Antti Vuolas 4
5	Italy (hosts)	13	Paco Castagna 9, Nicolas Vicentin 4
6	Latvia	12	Jevgeņijs Kostigovs 7, Daniils Kolodinskis 5
7	Germany	11	Norick Blödorn 8, Sandro Wasserman 3

== See also ==
- 2024 Speedway European Championship
- 2024 European Team Speedway Championship
