= 2021 Team Speedway Junior World Championship =

Motorcycle racing competition

2021 Team Speedway Under-21 World Championship

The 2021 Team Speedway Junior World Championship was the 17th FIM Team Under-21 World Championship season. The final took place on 10 September 2021, at the Polonia Bydgoszcz Stadium in Bydgoszcz, Poland.

The hosts Poland won their 14th Team Under-21 World Championship and eighth in succession. A new format was in place for 2021 with 7 teams; Poland, Denmark, Great Britain, Latvia, Sweden, Australia and the Czech Republic competing, with Germany listed as a standby team.

== Final ==
- (Poland) Bydgoszcz
- 10 September 2021

| Pos. | | National team | Points |
|---|---|---|---|
| 1 | Poland | Wiktor Lampart 24, Jakub Miśkowiak 21 | 45 |
| 2 | Denmark | Mads Hansen 17, Marcus Birkemose 11, Tim Sørensen 7 | 35 |
| 3 | Great Britain | Tom Brennan 20, Drew Kemp 5, Leon Flint 2 | 27 |
| 4 | Australia | Keynan Rew 17, Matthew Gilmore 9 | 26 |
| 5 | Czech Republic | Petr Chlupáč 12, Jan Macek 6, Daniel Klíma 5 | 23 |
| 6 | Latvia | Francis Gusts 15, Daniił Kołodinski 7, Ričards Ansviesulis 0 | 22 |
| 7 | Sweden | Philip Hellström Bängs 14, Alexander Woentin 6, Jonatan Grahn 0 | 20 |

== See also ==
- 2021 Speedway of Nations
- 2021 Individual Speedway Junior World Championship
