= 2022 Speedway of Nations 2 =

Motorcycle racing competition

The 2022 Speedway of Nations 2 (SON2) was the 18th FIM Team Under-21 World Championship season. The one-off final took place on 29 July 2022 at the Vojens Speedway Center in Vojens, Denmark.

Despite the change of name to Speedway of Nations 2 (SON2), the format remained the same as 2021 with seven teams - Australia, Czech Republic, Denmark, Great Britain, Latvia, Poland and Sweden competing for the title.

Defending champions Poland won their 15th Team Under-21 World Championship and ninth in succession. They topped the scoring charts during the main meeting, and then won the Grand Final against the Czech Republic. The Czechs were in a winning position until Petr Chlupáč suffered mechanic issues on the third lap. Great Britain finished third.

== Final ==
- (Denmark) Vojens
- 29 July 2022

Pos	Nation	Riders	Pts
1	Poland	Mateusz Cierniak 17, Jakub Miśkowiak 15, Wiktor Przyjemski 4	36
2	Czech Republic	Jan Kvěch 18, Petr Chlupáč 11	29
3	Great Britain	Tom Brennan 20, Drew Kemp 8	28
4	Latvia	Francis Gusts 22, Ričards Ansviesulis 6, Ernest Matjuszonok 0	28
5	Denmark	Benjamin Basso 21, Kevin Juhl Pedersen 5, Jonas Knudsen 0	26
6	Australia	Keynan Rew 12, Fraser Bowes 10	22
7	Sweden	Philip Hellström Bängs 9, Casper Henriksson 5, Gustav Grahn 4	18

=== Grand Final Qualifier ===
1st	2nd
Czech Republic - 6 Jan Kvěch - 4 Petr Chlupáč - 2	Great Britain - 3 Tom Brennan - 3 Drew Kemp - 0

=== Grand Final ===
1st	2nd
Poland - 6 Jakub Miśkowiak - 4 Mateusz Cierniak - 2	Czech Republic - 3 Jan Kvěch - 3 Petr Chlupáč - E/F

== See also ==
- 2022 Speedway of Nations
- 2022 SGP2
