= European Team Speedway Championship =

European motorcycle speedway competition

- Current season, competition or edition: 2026 European Team Speedway Championship
- Sport: motorcycle speedway
- Founded: 2022
- Most recent champion: Denmark (2026)

The European Team Speedway Championship is an annual motorcycle speedway team event to determine the team champions of Europe.

== History ==
The event was inaugurated in 2022. It was added to the speedway racing calendar as an early season event, in addition to the existing European individual and pairs events.

== Winners ==
Year	Final venue	Winners	2nd place	3rd place
2022	(Poland) Poznań	(Poland) Poland; Janusz Kołodziej; Bartosz Zmarzlik; Patryk Dudek; Maciej Janowski	(Denmark) Denmark; Anders Thomsen; Patrick Hansen; Rasmus Jensen; Frederik Jakobsen; Leon Madsen	(United Kingdom) Great Britain; Dan Bewley; Robert Lambert; Chris Harris; Adam Ellis
2023	(Germany) Stralsund	(Poland) Poland; Bartosz Zmarzlik; Szymon Wozniak; Dominik Kubera; Jarosław Hampel	(Denmark) Denmark; Mikkel Michelsen; Rasmus Jensen; Frederik Jakobsen; Andreas Lyager; Emil Breum	(United Kingdom) Great Britain; Dan Bewley; Adam Ellis; Tom Brennan; Richie Worrall
2024	(Poland) Grudziądz	(Poland) Poland; Bartosz Zmarzlik; Patryk Dudek; Przemysław Pawlicki; Piotr Pawlicki; Wiktor Przyjemski	(Denmark) Denmark; Mikkel Michelsen; Anders Thomsen; Rasmus Jensen; Mads Hansen	(Sweden) Sweden; Jacob Thorssell; Antonio Lindbäck; Fredrik Lindgren; Kim Nilsson; Casper Henriksson
2025	(Poland) Gdańsk	(Poland) Poland; Bartosz Zmarzlik; Patryk Dudek; Przemysław Pawlicki; Piotr Pawlicki; Wiktor Przyjemski	(Denmark) Denmark; Michael Jepsen Jensen; Frederik Jakobsen; Mikkel Michelsen; Rasmus Jensen; Bastian Pedersen	(Sweden) Sweden; Timo Lahti; Kim Nilsson; Victor Palovaara; Philip Hellström Bängs; Casper Henriksson
2026	(Poland) Rzeszów	(Denmark) Denmark; Rasmus Jensen; Michael Jepsen Jensen; Frederik Jakobsen; Mikkel Michelsen; Villads Nagel	(Poland) Poland; Bartosz Bańbor; Bartosz Zmarzlik; Przemysław Pawlicki; Bartłomiej Kowalski; Wiktor Przyjemski	(Sweden) Sweden; Jacob Thorssell; Fredrik Lindgren; Kim Nilsson; Erik Persson; Oliver Berntzon
