= 2021 Polish speedway season =

Motorcycle racing competition

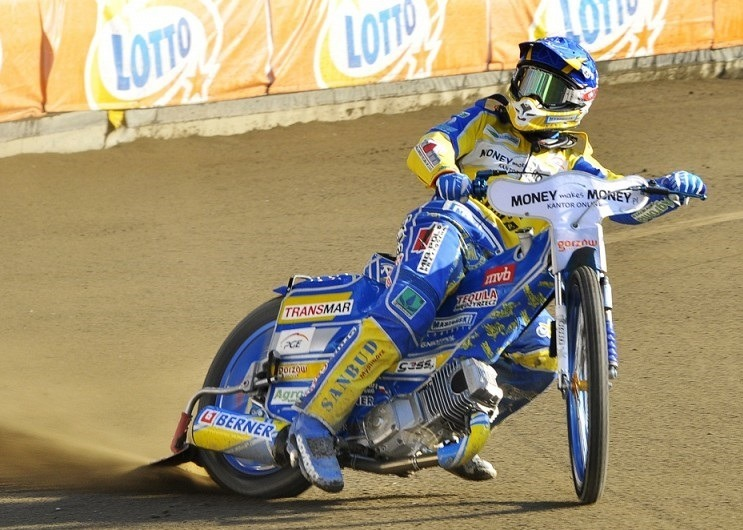
- Bartosz Zmarzlik won his first Polish title and successfully defended his Golden Helmet crown

The 2021 Polish speedway season was the 2021 season of motorcycle speedway in Poland.

== Individual ==
=== Polish Individual Speedway Championship ===
The 2021 Individual Speedway Polish Championship (Polish: Indywidualne Mistrzostwa Polski, IMP) was the 2021 version of Polish Individual Speedway Championship organised by the Polish Motor Union (PZM). The Championship was won by double world champion Bartosz Zmarzlik. The final was held at Stadion im. Alfreda Smoczyka in Leszno on 11 July 2021.

Pos.	Rider	Points	Total	Final
1	Bartosz Zmarzlik	(3,3,3,3,2)	14	3
2	Maciej Janowski	(2,2,2,3,3)	12	2
3	Janusz Kołodziej	(3,3,3,2,3)	14	1
4	Krzysztof Kasprzak	(1,1,2,3,3)	10	0
5	Piotr Pawlicki Jr.	(0,3,1,3,3)	10	
6	Wiktor Lampart	(3,1,2,1,2)	9	
7	Jarosław Hampel	(3,2,1,2,0)	8	
	Szymon Woźniak	(2,1,2,2,1)	8	
9	Paweł Przedpełski	(1,2,3,0,1)	7	
	Oskar Fajfer	(1,2,3,t,1)	7	
11	Marcin Nowak	(0,1,1,1,2)	5	
12	Tobiasz Musielak	(2,t,1,1,0)	4	
13	Jakub Miśkowiak	(0.3.0.0.0)	3	
	Przemysław Pawlicki	(1.0,w/u,2.0)	3	
	Kacper Woryna (res)	(2,0,1)	3	
16	Grzegorz Walasek	(t,0,0,0,2)	2	
17	Mateusz Szczepaniak	(0,0,0,0,1)	1	
18	Norbert Kościuch (res)	(ns)	x	

=== Golden Helmet ===
The 2021 Golden Golden Helmet (Polish: Turniej o Złoty Kask, ZK) organised by the Polish Motor Union (PZM) was the 2021 event for the league's leading riders. The final was held at Zielona Góra on the 21 June. Bartosz Zmarzlik won the Golden Helmet for the second successive season.

Pos.	Rider	Club	Total	Points
1	Bartosz Zmarzlik	Gorzów Wlkp.	13	(3,2,2,3,3)
2	Janusz Kołodziej	Leszno	11+3	(0,3,3,3,2)
3	Paweł Przedpełski	Toruń	11+2	(2,3,3,3,t)
4	Jakub Miśkowiak	Częstochowa	10	(1,2,3,1,3)
5	Szymon Woźniak	Gorzów Wlkp.	10	(2,2,3,2,1)
6	Piotr Protasiewicz	Zielona Góra	9	(0,3,1,2,3)
7	Jarosław Hampel	Lublin	9	(3,2,0,2,2)
8	Patryk Dudek	Zielona Góra	8	(3,3,0,1,1)
9	Mateusz Tonder	Zielona Góra	7	(2,0,2,3,0)
10	Bartosz Smektała	Częstochowa	7	(2,1,0,1,3)
11	Wiktor Lampart	Lublin	7	(3,1,2,0,1)
12	Kacper Woryna	Częstochowa	5	(1,0,2,0,2)
13	Mateusz Cierniak	Lublin	5	(0,1,1,2,1)
14	Mateusz Świdnicki	Częstochowa	3	(1,0,2)
15	Dominik Kubera	Lublin	3	(1,1,1,w,0)
16	Gleb Chugunov	Wrocław	2	(1,0,1,–,–)
17	Tobiasz Musielak	Krosno	0	(0,0,0,0,0)

=== Criterium of Aces ===
The Mieczysław Połukard Criterium of Aces was won by Bartosz Zmarzlik.

=== U21 Championship ===
- winner Jakub Miśkowiak

=== Silver Helmet ===
- winner - Jakub Miśkowiak

=== Bronze Helmet ===
- winner - Mateusz Cierniak

== Pairs ==
=== Polish Pairs Speedway Championship ===
The 2021 Polish Pairs Speedway Championship was the 2021 edition of the Polish Pairs Speedway Championship. The final was held on 3 September at Grudziądz

Pos	Team	Pts	Riders
1	GKM Grudziądz	27	Przemysław Pawlicki 16, Krzysztof Kasprzak 11
2	Włókniarz Częstochowa	23	Bartosz Smektała 14, Kacper Woryna 9
3	Falubaz Zielona Góra	22	Piotr Protasiewicz 15, Damian Pawliczak 7
4	Unia Leszno	20	Damian Dróżdż 10, Damian Baliński 5, Szymon Szlauderbach 5
5	Apator Toruń	18	Paweł Przedpełski 10, Krzysztof Lewandowski 6, Karol Żupiński 2
6	WTS Sparta Wrocław	10	Przemysław Liszka 7, Mateusz Panicz 3
7	Stal Gorzów Wielkopolski	6	Rafał Karczmarz 5, Kamil Pytlewski 1

== Team ==
=== Team Speedway Polish Championship ===
The 2021 Team Speedway Polish Championship was the 2021 edition of the Team Polish Championship. WTS Sparta Wrocław won the Ekstraliga and were awarded the gold medal and declared Polish Team Champions. The team finishing second and third were awarded silver and bronze medals respectively.

TZ Ostrovia Ostrów Wielkopolski won the 1. Liga and Landshut Devils won the 2. Liga. German team Landshut Devils joined 2. Liga due to problems with the German leagues in connection to COVID-19 pandemic.

=== Ekstraliga ===
Pos	Team	P	W	D	L	BP	Pts
1	Wrocław	14	12	0	2	6	30
2	Lublin	14	9	1	4	5	24
3	Gorzów	14	9	0	5	5	23
4	Leszno	14	9	0	5	4	22
5	Częstochowa	14	7	0	7	4	18
6	Toruń	14	3	1	10	2	9
7	Grudziądz	14	2	3	9	0	7
8	Zielona Góra	14	2	1	11	1	6

Quarter-finals

Team 1	Team 2	Score
Gorzow	Lublin	41–49, 43–47
Leszno	Wroclaw	41–49, 43–47

Semi-finals

Team 1	Team 2	Score
Leszno	Gorzow	41–49, 49–41

Final

Team 1	Team 2	Score
Lublin	Wroclaw	45–45, 40–50

=== 1. Liga ===
Pos	Team	P	Pts
1	Ostrów	14	24
2	Krosno	14	24
3	Rybnik	14	23
4	Gdańsk	14	20
5	Bydgoszcz	14	17
6	Łódź	14	15
7	Gniezno	14	8
8	Tarnów	14	3

Semi-finals

Team 1	Team 2	Score
Rybnik	Ostrow	44–45, 3–59
Gdansk	Krosno	45–45, 35–55

Final

Team 1	Team 2	Score
Ostrow	Krosno	60–30, 40–49

=== 2. Liga ===
Pos	Team	P	Pts
1	Landshut Devils (Germany)	12	19
2	Opole	12	27
3	Rawicz	12	23
4	Daugavpils (Latvia)	12	13
5	Rzeszów	12	13
6	Poznań	12	10
7	Wölfe Wittstock (Germany)	12	0

Semi-finals

Team 1	Team 2	Score
Landshut	Rawicz	60–30, 50–40,
Daugavpils	Opole	43–47, 22–68

Final

Team 1	Team 2	Score
Landshut	Opole	52–38, 40–49
