= 2019 Individual Speedway Junior European Championship =

Motorcycle racing competition

The 2019 European Individual Speedway Junior Championship (also known as the 2019 Speedway European Under 21 Championship) was the 22nd edition of the Championship.

The U21 final was staged at Rivne Speedway Stadium in Ukraine and was won by Wiktor Lampart of Poland.

The U19 final was staged at Žarnovica in Slovakia and was won by Jan Kvěch of the Czech Republic.

== Under 21 ==
=== Final ===
- 31 August 2019
- (Ukraine) Rivne Speedway Stadium, Rivne

Pos.	Rider	Points	Details
1	(Poland) Wiktor Lampart	12+3	(2, 3, 3, 3, 1)
2	(Russia) Roman Lakhbaum	12+2	(3, 1, 3, 2, 3)
3	(Denmark) Mads Hansen	11	(3, 2, 2, 2, 2)
4	(Poland) Jakub Miśkowiak	10	(3, 3, 1, 3, 0)
5	(England) Dan Bewley	10	(2, 3, 3, 0, 2)
6	(Czech Republic) Jan Kvěch	10	(2, 2, X, 3, 3)
7	(Ukraine) Marko Levishyn	9	(0, 2, 3, 1, 3)
8	(Poland) Mateusz Cierniak	8	(1, 1, 2, 2, 2)
9	(Czech Republic) Petr Chlupáč	7	(1, 0, 2, 3, 1)
10	(Latvia) Daniils Kolodinskis	6	(2, R, 1, X, 3)
11	(Denmark) Jason Jørgensen	6	(3, 1, F, 1, 1)
12	(Sweden) Alexander Woentin	5	(0, 2, X, 2, 2)
13	(Poland) Michał Curzytek	5	(1, 3, X, 1, 0)
14	(Germany) Dominik Mӧser	5	(1, 1, 2, 0, 1)
15	(Latvia) Artjoms Trofimovs	2	( 0, 0, 1, 1, 0)
16	(Hungary) Denis Fazekas	0	(0, 0, 0, 0, 0)

== Under 19 ==
The final was staged at Žarnovica in Slovakia and was won by Jan Kvěch of the Czech Republic.

=== Final ===
- 12 August 2019
- (Slovakia) Žarnovica

Pos.	Rider	Points	Details
1	(Czech Republic) Jan Kvěch	14+3	(2,3,3,3,3)
2	(Russia) Evgeny Saidullin	14+2	(3,3,3,3,2)
3	(Denmark) Mads Hansen	13	(3,3,2,2,3)
4	(Russia) Aleksandr Kajbushev	10	(3,t,1,3,3)
5	(Poland) Mateusz Cierniak	8	(3,2,3,0,0)
6	(England) Drew Kemp	8	(0,w,3,2,3)
7	(Czech Republic) Petr Chlupáč	8	(2,w,2,2,2)
8	(Sweden) Alexander Woentin	7	(1,3,1,2,0)
9	(Denmark) Jonas Seifert-Salk	7	(w,1,1,3,2)
10	(Poland) Karol Zupinski	6	(2,0,2,1,1)
11	(Denmark) Christian Thaysen	6	(1,2,1,1,1)
12	(Denmark) Emil Pørtner	5	(1,2,2,0,0)
13	(Slovakia) David Pacalaj	4	(0,1,0,1,2)
14	(Sweden) Philip Hellström Bängs	3	(2,0,0,1,0)
15	(England) Jason Edwards	3	(0,2,0,0,1)
16	(Germany) Lukas Baumann	3	(1,1,u,0,1)
17	(Ukraine) Marko Levishyn	1	(1)

== See also ==
- 2019 Speedway European Championship
