= 2024 European Under 23 Team Speedway Championship =

European speedway competition

The 2024 European Under 23 Team Speedway Championship is the 17th Team Speedway Junior European Championship season. It was organised by the Fédération Internationale de Motocyclisme and was the fourth time that the event had an age limit of under 23 years of age.

The qualifying round was held at the Svítkov Stadium in Pardubice on 20 April. The Czech Republic won the qualifier with 50 points, Great Britain (35), France (20) and Germany (14) were all eliminated.

The final took place in Poland for the sixth time since 2008, on 24 August 2024 at the Kraków Speedway Stadium and was won by Poland again.

== Results ==
=== Qualifying Round ===
- Svítkov Stadium in Pardubice, Czech Republic
- 20 April

Pos.	National team	Pts.	Scorers
1	Czech Republic	50	Adam Bednář 15, Jan Macek 13, Jan Kvěch 11, Daniel Klíma 9, Jan Jeníček 2
2	Great Britain	35	Anders Rowe 12, Tom Brennan 10, Leon Flint 9, Ashton Boughen 3, Jordan Jenkins 2
3	France	20	Steven Goret 6, Mathias Trésarrieu 6, Steven Labouyrie 6, Tino Bouin 1, Theo Ugoni 1
4	Germany	14	Erik Bachhuber 5, Patrick Hyjek 3, Ben Iken 3, Jonny Wynant 2, Lukas Wegner 1

=== Final ===
- Kraków Speedway Stadium, Poland
- 24 August

Pos.	National team	Pts.	Scorers
1	Poland	43	Mateusz Cierniak 15, Bartosz Bańbor 12, Bartłomiej Kowalski 8, Jakub Krawczyk 6, Wiktor Przyjemski 2
2	Czech Republic	31	Jan Kvěch 13, Daniel Klíma 9, Adam Bednář 7, Jan Macek 1, Matous Kamenik 1
3	Denmark	25	Benjamin Basso 8, Bastian Pedersen 6,Mikkel Andersen 5, Kevin Juhl Pedersen 4, Vilads Nagel 2
4	Sweden	20	Casper Henriksson 8, Noel Wahlqvist 5, Philip Hellström Bängs 4, Sammy Van Dyck 2, Rasmus Karlsson 1

== See also ==
- 2024 World Junior Team Championship
- 2024 Individual Speedway Junior European Championship
