= 2021 Speedway of Nations =

International motorsport

The 2021 Speedway of Nations (sponsored by Monster Energy) was the fourth FIM Speedway of Nations. The competition consisted of two semi-finals and a final. The final was held on 16 & 17 October 2021 and was won by Great Britain, with Poland taking silver and Denmark bronze.

During the final Poland took a first leg lead of ten points ahead of Great Britain. Britain's multiple world champion Tai Woffinden suffered an injury after crashing heavily and was replaced by Dan Bewley for the second leg. Denmark topped the points table during the second leg but Poland earned an automatic place in the grand final after finishing with the highest total from the two legs. This meant that Denmark and Great Britain would take part in the eliminator as the second and third best teams, which Britain won by 6 points to 3. In the grand final, former world champion Bartosz Zmarzlik came out on top but he was followed home by Robert Lambert and Dan Bewley, giving Britain the title by 5 points to 4. It was their first World team title since 1989.

== First semi-final ==
- Daugavpils, Latvia
- 17 September

Pos	Nation	Riders	Pts
1	Poland	Bartosz Zmarzlik 21, Dominik Kubera 13, Jakub Miśkowiak 3	37
2	Sweden	Fredrik Lindgren 23, Pontus Aspgren 8, Philip Hellström Bängs 3	34
3	Denmark	Leon Madsen 12, Mikkel Michelsen 18, Mads Hansen 2	32
4	United States	Broc Nicol 7, Luke Becker 21, Blake Borello 0	28
5	Finland	Timo Lahti 18, Tero Aarnio 6, Timi Salonen 0	24
6	Slovenia	Matic Ivačič 10, Nick Škorja 7, Anže Grmek 0	17
7	Czech Republic	Václav Milík Jr. 11, Josef Franc 4, Petr Chlupáč 2	17

== Second semi-final ==
- Daugavpils, Latvia
- 18 September

Pos	Nation	Riders	Pts
1	Australia	Jason Doyle 23, Max Fricke 12, Keynan Rew 0	35
2	Latvia	Andžejs Ļebedevs 18, Oļegs Mihailovs 14, Francis Gusts 2	34
3	France	David Bellego 15, Dimitri Bergé 13, Steven Goret 2	30
4	Germany	Kai Huckenbeck 22, Norick Blödorn 5, Valentin Grobauer 0	27
5	Russia	Vladimir Borodulin 13, Sergey Logachev 10, Mark Karion 2	25
6	Italy	Michele Paco Castagna 12, Nicolás Covatti 7, Daniele Tessari 0	19
7	Ukraine	Aleksandr Loktaev 15, Marko Levishyn 4, Vitalii Lysak 0	19

== Final ==
- National Speedway Stadium, Manchester, England
- 16 & 17 October

=== First leg ===
Pos	Nation	Riders	Pts
1	Poland	Bartosz Zmarzlik 19, Maciej Janowski 18, Jakub Miśkowiak 3	40
2	Great Britain	Tai Woffinden 14, Robert Lambert 12, Tom Brennan 4	30
3	Denmark	Leon Madsen 21, Mikkel Michelsen 5, Mads Hansen 3	29
4	Latvia	Andžejs Ļebedevs 19, Oļegs Mihailovs 5, Francis Gusts 0	24
5	Australia	Max Fricke 18, Jason Doyle 6, Keynan Rew 0	24
6	France	David Bellego 15, Dimitri Bergé 9, Steven Goret 0	24
7	Sweden	Philip Hellström Bängs 10, Pontus Aspgren 4, Jacob Thorssell 2	16

=== Second leg ===
Pos	Nation	Riders	Pts
1	Denmark	Mikkel Michelsen 18, Leon Madsen 17, Mads Hansen 4	39
2	Great Britain	Robert Lambert 20, Dan Bewley 11, Tom Brennan 3	34
3	Poland	Bartosz Zmarzlik 19, Maciej Janowski 13, Jakub Miśkowiak 2	34
4	Australia	Max Fricke 12, Jason Doyle 9, Keynan Rew 4	25
5	France	David Bellego 19, Dimitri Bergé 4, Steven Goret 0	23
6	Latvia	Andžejs Ļebedevs 13, Oļegs Mihailovs 3, Francis Gusts 2	18
7	Sweden	Philip Hellström Bängs 14, Pontus Aspgren 0, Jacob Thorssell 0	14

=== Total ===
Pos	Nation	Riders	Pts
1	Poland	Bartosz Zmarzlik 38, Maciej Janowski 31, Jakub Miśkowiak 5	74
2	Denmark	Leon Madsen 38, Mikkel Michelsen 23, Mads Hansen 7	68
3	Great Britain	Robert Lambert 32, Tai Woffinden 14, Dan Bewley 11, Tom Brennan 7	64
4	Australia	Max Fricke 30, Jason Doyle 15, Keynan Rew 4	49
5	France	David Bellego 34, Dimitri Bergé 13, Steven Goret 0	47
6	Latvia	Andžejs Ļebedevs 32, Oļegs Mihailovs 8, Francis Gusts 2	42
7	Sweden	Philip Hellström Bängs 24, Pontus Aspgren 4, Jacob Thorssell 2	30

=== Grand Final Qualifier ===
1st	2nd
Great Britain - 6 Robert Lambert - 4 Dan Bewley - 2	Denmark - 3 Leon Madsen - 3 Mikkel Michelsen - 0

=== Grand Final ===
1st	2nd
Great Britain - 5 Robert Lambert - 3 Dan Bewley - 2	Poland - 4 Bartosz Zmarzlik - 4 Maciej Janowski - 0
