= 2024 Speedway of Nations =

Speedway competition for national teams

The 2024 Speedway of Nations was the sixth edition of the Speedway of Nations, and 32nd edition of a pairs competition for national teams in motorcycle speedway. The competition consisted of three events, which took place at the National Speedway Stadium in Manchester, England, between 9 July and 13 July 2024. The under-21 Speedway of Nations 2 took place at the same venue on 12 July.

The first semi-final was won by Sweden, who finished one point ahead of Poland. Germany also secured a place in the final after winning the final qualifier against Finland. Denmark won the second semi-final ahead of Australia, while Latvia beat the Czech Republic in the second final qualifier to secure the last spot.

The final was won by Great Britain.

== First semi-final ==
- National Speedway Stadium, Manchester, England
- 9 July (top 2 to final, 3rd-4th to final qualifier)

Pos	Nation	Riders	Pts
1	Sweden	Fredrik Lindgren (C) 22, Jacob Thorssell 16, Oliver Berntzon 0	38
2	Poland	Dominik Kubera 19, Bartosz Zmarzlik (C) 10, Maciej Janowski 8	37
3	Germany	Kai Huckenbeck (C) 22, Norick Blödorn 11, Erik Riss 0	33
4	Finland	Antti Vuolas 17, Jesse Mustonen (C) 6, Otto Raak 0	23
5	Italy	Michele Paco Castagna (C) 17, Nicolás Covatti 2, Nicolas Vicentin 2	21
6	France	David Bellego (C) 19, Steven Goret 0, Mathias Tresarrieu 0	19
7	Ukraine	Stanislav Melnychuk (C) 10, Marko Levishyn 6	16

=== Final Qualifier ===
1st	2nd
Germany - 7 Kai Huckenbeck - 4 Norick Blödorn - 3	Finland - 2 Antti Vuolas - 2 Jesse Mustonen - 0

== Second semi-final ==
- National Speedway Stadium, Manchester, England
- 10 July (top 2 to final, 3rd-4th to final qualifier)

Pos	Nation	Riders	Pts
1	Denmark	Anders Thomsen 17, Rasmus Jensen 14, Mikkel Michelsen (C) 9	40
2	Australia	Brady Kurtz 13, Max Fricke 11, Jack Holder (C) 10	34
3	Czech Republic	Jan Kvěch 18, Václav Milík (C) 12, Adam Bednar 0	30
4	Latvia	Andžejs Ļebedevs (C) 18, Daniils Kolodinskis 7, Jevgeņijs Kostigovs 2	27
5	Slovenia	Anže Grmek 11, Matic Ivačič (C) 9, Denis Stojs 0	20
6	United States	Luke Becker 20, Gino Manzares (C) 0, Broc Nicol 0	20
7	Norway	Mathias Pollestad (C) 14, Glenn Moi 4, Truls Kamhaug 0	18

=== Final Qualifier ===
1st	2nd
Latvia - 6 Andžejs Ļebedevs - 4 Daniils Kolodinskis - 2	Czech Republic - 3 Václav Milík - 3 Jan Kvěch - 0

== Final ==
- National Speedway Stadium, Manchester, England
- 13 July

Pos	Nation	Riders	Pts
1	Australia	Jack Holder (C) 20, Brady Kurtz 16, Max Fricke 0	36
2	Great Britain	Robert Lambert (C) 22, Dan Bewley 13, Tom Brennan 0	35
3	Sweden	Fredrik Lindgren (C) 17, Jacob Thorssell 10, Oliver Berntzon 0	27
4	Germany	Kai Huckenbeck (C) 16, Norick Blödorn 10, Erik Riss 0	26
5	Poland	Dominik Kubera 13, Bartosz Zmarzlik (C) 11, Patryk Dudek 0	24
6	Denmark	Mikkel Michelsen (C) 8, Rasmus Jensen 8, Anders Thomsen 5	21
7	Latvia	Andžejs Ļebedevs (C) 12, Daniils Kolodinskis 6, Jevgeņijs Kostigovs 2	20

=== Grand Final Qualifier ===
1st	2nd
Great Britain - 5 Robert Lambert - 3 Dan Bewley - 2	Sweden - 4 Fredrik Lindgren - 4 Jacob Thorssell - 0

=== Grand Final ===
1st	2nd
Great Britain - 7 Robert Lambert - 4 Dan Bewley - 3	Australia - 2 Jack Holder - 2 Brady Kurtz - 0
