= 2021 Speedway Under-21 World Championship =

World motorcycle speedway event

World Under 21 Championship
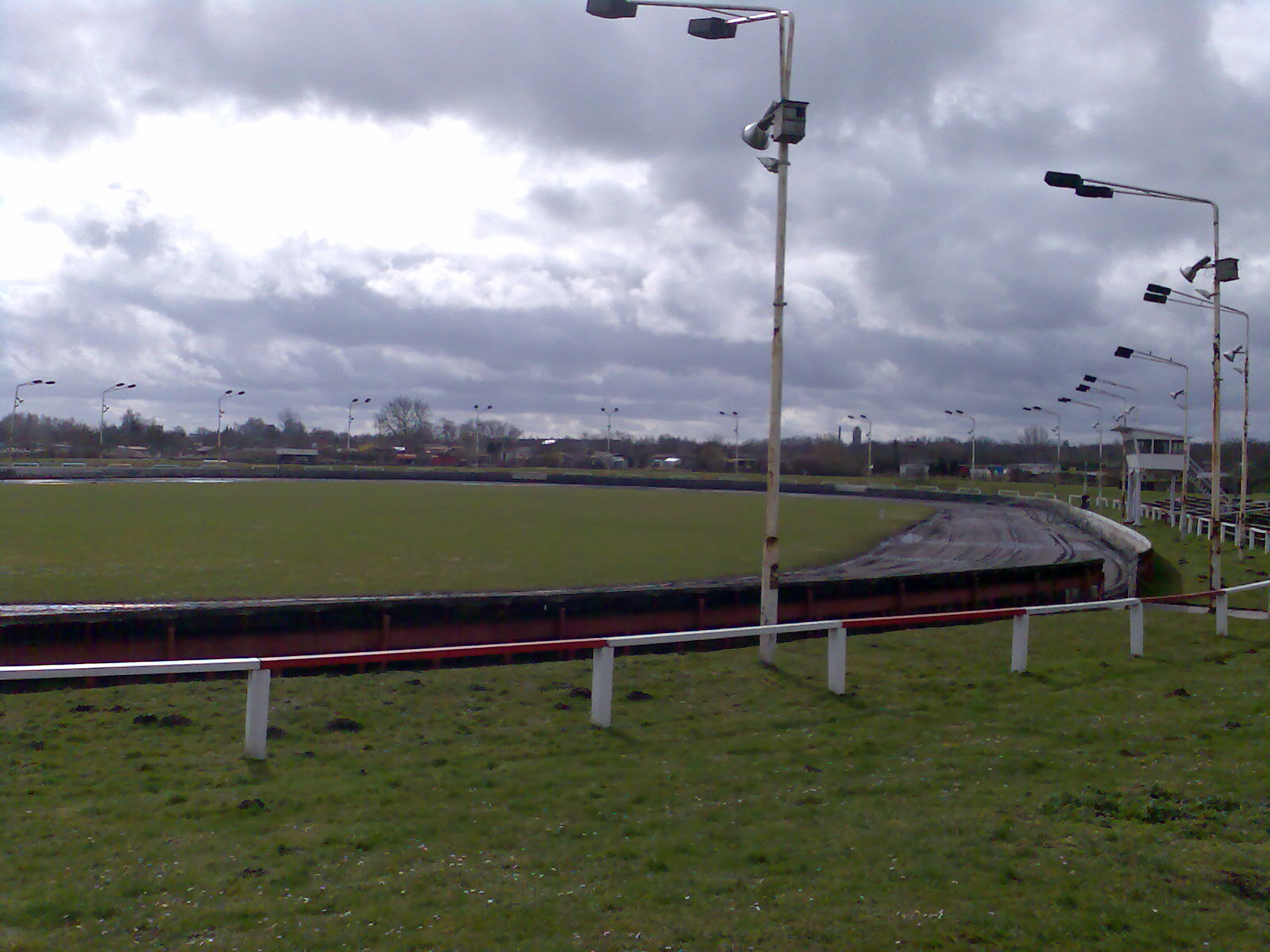
- The Paul-Greifzu-Stadion held the opening round of the Championship.

The 2021 Individual Speedway Under 21 World Championship was the 45th edition of the FIM Individual Under-21 World Championship. It was staged over three rounds, at Stralsund, Krosno and Pardubice.

Pole Jakub Miśkowiak won the title after winning two of the three rounds. It was the last time that the event was known as the Under 21, with a rebranding to SGP2 taking place in 2022.

== Final series ==
No.	Date	Venue	Winner	Runner-up	3rd place
1	4 September	(Germany) Paul Greifzu Stadium, Stralsund	(Denmark) Mads Hansen	(Poland) Wiktor Lampart	(Poland) Jakub Miśkowiak
2	25 September	(Poland) Stadion MOSiR Krosno, Krosno	(Poland) Jakub Miśkowiak	(Poland) Mateusz Cierniak	(Denmark) Mads Hansen
3	1 October	(Czech Republic) Svítkov Stadium, Pardubice	(Poland) Jakub Miśkowiak	(Denmark) Mads Hansen	(Czech Republic) Jan Kvěch

== Final standings ==
Pos	Rider	1	2	3	Total
Gold	(Poland) Jakub Miśkowiak	18	20	20	58
Silver	(Denmark) Mads Hansen	20	16	18	54
Bronze	(Poland) Wiktor Lampart	16	14	10	40
4	(Poland) Mateusz Świdnicki	9	10	12	31
5	(Czech Republic) Petr Chlupáč	7	11	11	29
6	(Latvia) Francis Gusts	12	9	7	28
	(Czech Republic) Jan Kvěch	0	12	16	28
	(Germany) Norick Blödorn	14	x	14	28
9	(Sweden) Alexander Woentin	11	8	6	25
10	(Latvia) Daniils Kolodinskis	8	5	5	18
	(Poland) Mateusz Cierniak	x	18	x	18
12	(Germany) Lukas Baumann	6	2	9	17
13	(Russia) Mark Karion	10	6	x	16
14	(Ukraine) Marko Levyshyn	3	8	1	12
15	(Australia) Matthew Gilmore	4	2	4	10
16	(Czech Republic) Daniel Klíma	x	x	8	8
17	(Latvia) Ernest Matjuszonok	5	0	x	5
	(France) Steven Goret	2	1	2	5
19	(Poland) Michał Curzytek	x	4	x	4
20	(England) Drew Kemp	x	x	3	3
21	(Germany) Marius Hillebrand	1	x	x	1
22	(Germany) Fynn Ole Schmietendorf	0	x	x	0
	(Poland) Dawid Rempała	x	0	x	0

== See also ==
- 2021 Speedway Grand Prix
- 2021 Team Speedway Junior World Championship
