= 2022 SGP2 =

World motorcycle speedway event

World Under 21 Championship

The 2022 SGP2 series was the 46th edition of the FIM Individual Under-21 World Championship. It was staged as the SGP2 class of the FIM Speedway Grand Prix series after rights holders Discovery Sports Events took over promotional rights of the competition prior to the start of the season.

The series was staged over three rounds at Prague, Cardiff and Toruń.

Poland's Mateusz Cierniak won the title, winning two of the three rounds in the process. Jan Kvěch finished second with defending champion Jakub Miśkowiak claiming third.

== Calendar ==
The 2022 season consisted of three events.

Round	Date	Venue	Winner
1	27 May	(Czech Republic) Markéta Stadium, Prague	(Poland) Mateusz Cierniak
2	14 August	(Wales) Principality Stadium, Cardiff	(Poland) Mateusz Cierniak
3	30 September	(Poland) Rose Motoarena, Toruń	(Poland) Jakub Miśkowiak

== Final Classification ==
Pos.	Rider	Points	(Czech Republic)	(Wales)	(Poland)
Gold	(Poland) (842) Mateusz Cierniak (C)	56	20	20	16
Silver	(Czech Republic) (201) Jan Kvěch	39	14	14	11
Bronze	(Poland) (515) Jakub Miśkowiak	38	10	8	20
4	(Poland) (47) Wiktor Lampart	37	8	11	18
5	(Denmark) (92) Benjamin Basso	37	9	16	12
6	(Denmark) (196) Kevin Juhl Pedersen	27	4	18	5
7	(Czech Republic) (44) Petr Chlupáč	24	16	4	4
8	(Poland) (108) Mateusz Świdnicki	22	7	1	14
9	(United Kingdom) (27) Tom Brennan	22	–	12	10
10	(Latvia) (2) Francis Gusts	18	18	–	–
11	(Denmark) (408) Jonas Knudsen	15	11	3	1
12	(Finland) (281) Timi Salonen	14	12	–	2
13	(Sweden) (118) Gustav Grahn	12	5	7	–
14	(Sweden) (43) Casper Henriksson	11	6	2	3
15	(United Kingdom) (16) Leon Flint	10	–	10	–
16	(Poland) (47) Wiktor Przyjemski	10	1	–	9
17	(Germany) (33) Norick Blödorn	9	–	9	–
18	(Australia) (127) Keynan Rew	8	–	–	8
18	(Czech Republic) (717) Daniel Klíma	8	2	0	6
20	(Poland) (18) Krzysztof Lewandowski	7	–	–	7
21	(United Kingdom) (18) Jason Edwards	6	–	6	–
22	(United Kingdom) (17) Drew Kemp	5	–	5	–
23	(Germany) (16) Celina Liebmann	3	3	–	0

Note: Tom Brennan was first reserve and took the place of Gustav Grahn for the Polish Grand Prix at Toruń after the Swede announced a break from the sport.

== See also ==
- 2022 Speedway Grand Prix
- 2022 Team Junior World Championship
