= 2023 European Under-19 Individual Speedway Championship =

European motorcycle speedway event

The 2023 European Individual Speedway Junior Championship was the 26th edition of the Championship. The semi finals were held at Elgane in Norway on 10 June and Žarnovica in Slovakia on 29 July.

The final was staged at the Edward Jancarz Stadium in Gorzów Wielkopolski, Poland on 19 August and was won by Wiktor Przyjemski. The defending champion Jesper Knudsen could only manage a 12th-place finish.

== Final ==
- 19 August 2023
- (Poland) Gorzów Wielkopolski

Pos.	Rider	Points	Details
1	(Poland) Wiktor Przyjemski	15	3, 3, 3, 3, 3
2	(Poland) Damian Ratajczak	12	3, 3, 3, 2, 1
3	(Norway) Mathias Pollestad	12	1, 3, 2, 3, 3
4	(Germany) Norick Blödorn	12	2, 3, 3, 2, 2
5	(Poland) Oskar Paluch	10	2, X, 2, 3, 3
6	(Denmark) William Drejer	8	2, 2, 3, 1, 0
	(Ukraine) Nazar Parnitskiy	8	0, 2, 2, 1, 3
8	(Sweden) Casper Henriksson	8	1, 2, 1, 2, 2
9	(Poland) Antoni Mencel	7	1, 1, 2, 3, R
	(Austria) Sebastian Kössler	7	3, 1, X, 1, 2
11	(Poland) Krzysztof Lewandowski	6	3, 1, 0, 0, 2
12	(Denmark) Jesper Knudsen	6	1, 1, 1, 2, 1
13	(Denmark) Niklas Holm Jakobsen	4	0, 2, 1, 0, 1
	(Slovenia) Anže Grmek	4	2, 0, 1, 0, 1
15	(Denmark) Nicklas Aagaard	1	0, 0, 0, 1, 0
16	(Germany) Jonny Wynant	0	0, 0, F, 0, 0

== See also ==
- 2023 Speedway European Championship
