= Paul Greifzu Stadium =

Paul Greifzu Stadium may refer to

- Paul Greifzu Stadium (Dessau-Roßlau)
- Paul Greifzu Stadium (Stralsund)
