= 2023 Speedway World Cup =

59th edition of the annual motorcycle speedway World Cup competition

Speedway World Cup
- Venue: Stadion Olimpijski
- Location: Wrocław, Poland
- Start date: 25 July
- End date: 29 July
- Nations: 9
- Website: https://www.fimspeedway.com/swc

Medalists
gold medal	Poland
silver medal	Great Britain
bronze medal	Denmark

The 2023 FIM Speedway World Cup (SWC) was the 18th Speedway World Cup, an international motorcycle speedway world championship tournament organised by the FIM. The 2023 edition was the first since 2017 and took place between 25 July and 29 July 2023 and involved nine national teams.

Poland successfully defended their 2017 title defeating Great Britain after a last heat decider. Great Britain trailed Poland by one point going into the final heat and Robert Lambert (who had only dropped one point all night) was positioned in second place with Maciej Janowski in fourth, which meant that Great Britain would take the title. However, Janowski moved into third place, which would send the final into a run-off, but the Pole overtook Lambert on the last lap to claim victory for Poland.

== Semi final 1 ==
- Stadion Olimpijski, Wrocław, Poland
- 25 July 2023

Pos.	National team	Pts.	Scorers
1	Great Britain	43	Dan Bewley 13, Robert Lambert 13, Tai Woffinden (C) 10, Adam Ellis 4, Tom Brennan (res) 2
2	Sweden	32	Freddie Lindgren (C) 12, Jacob Thorssell 8, Antonio Lindbäck 6, Oliver Berntzon 5, Kim Nilsson (res) 1
3	Czech Republic	23	Václav Milík Jr. (C/res) 11, Jan Kvěch 10, Petr Chlupáč 1, Daniel Klíma 1, Hynek Štichauer 0
4	Germany	22	Kai Huckenbeck 11 (C), Kevin Wölbert 7, Erik Riss (res) 2, Martin Smolinski 1, Norick Blödorn 1

== Semi final 2 ==
- Stadion Olimpijski, Wrocław, Poland
- 26 July 2023

Pos.	National team	Pts.	Scorers
1	Denmark	42	Leon Madsen (C) 13, Anders Thomsen 13, Mikkel Michelsen 8, Nicki Pedersen 6, Rasmus Jensen (res) 2
2	Australia	41	Jaimon Lidsey 16, Jack Holder 14, Jason Doyle (C) 7, Max Fricke 4, Chris Holder (res) dnr
3	France	21	Dimitri Bergé 14, David Bellego (C) 5, Steven Goret 1, Mathieu Trésarrieu 1, Mathias Trésarrieu (res) 0
4	Finland	16	Timo Lahti (C) 7, Antti Vuolas 6, Jesse Mustonen 3, Tero Aarnio 0, Niklas Säyriö (res) dnr

== Race off for final place ==
- Stadion Olimpijski, Wrocław, Poland
- 28 July 2023

Pos.	National team	Pts.	Scorers
1	Australia	54	Max Fricke 14, Jaimon Lidsey 12, Jason Doyle (C) 12, Jack Holder 9, Chris Holder (res) 7
2	Sweden	35	Freddie Lindgren (C) 11, Antonio Lindbäck 12, Jacob Thorssell 6, Oliver Berntzon 3, Kim Nilsson (res) 3
3	France	20	Dimitri Bergé 10, David Bellego (C) 7, Mathieu Trésarrieu 3, Steven Goret 0, Mathias Trésarrieu (res) 0
4	Czech Republic	11	Václav Milík Jr. (C) 7, Jan Kvěch 3, Petr Chlupáč 1, Daniel Klíma 0, Hynek Štichauer 0

== Final ==
- Stadion Olimpijski, Wrocław, Poland
- 29 July 2023

Pos.	National team	Pts.	Scorers
1	Poland	33	Bartosz Zmarzlik (C) 11, Dominik Kubera 9, Maciej Janowski 7, Patryk Dudek 6, Janusz Kołodziej 0
2	Great Britain	31	Robert Lambert 12, Dan Bewley 9, Tai Woffinden (C) 7, Adam Ellis 3, Tom Brennan 0
3	Denmark	29	Rasmus Jensen 13, Leon Madsen (C) 9, Anders Thomsen 5, Mikkel Michelsen 2, Nicki Pedersen 0
4	Australia	27	Jason Doyle (C) 10, Jack Holder 8, Max Fricke 7, Jaimon Lidsey 1, Chris Holder 1

== Final classification ==
Pos.	National team	Pts.
Gold	Poland	33
Silver	Great Britain	31
Bronze	Denmark	29
4	Australia	27
5	Sweden	35
6	France	20
7	Czech Republic	11
8	Germany	22
9	Finland	16
