= Alexander Woentin =

Swedish speedway rider

- Born: 3 July 2000 (age 26); Eksjö, Sweden
- Nationality: Swedish

Career history

Sweden
- 2018-2019: Smederna
- 2020: Vetlanda
- 2021: Piraterna
- 2022: Dackarna

Poland
- 2021: Tarnów

Individual honours
- 2020: European U21 Championship bronze
- 2017, 2019, 2020: Swedish U21 champion

Alexander Woentin (born 3 July 2000) is a speedway rider from Sweden.

== Speedway career ==
Woentin came to prominence in 2017, when he qualified for the finals of both the World U21 Championship and the European U19 Championship.

The following year, Woentin became a regular member of the Sweden national under-21 speedway team and helped them reach the 2018 Team Junior European Championship final. During 2019, he reached the finals of the European U21 and U19 Championships before he was selected for the Sweden national speedway team where he stood as reserve during the 2020 Speedway of Nations. He also won a bronze medal at the 2020 Junior European Championship.

Woentin finished ninth in the 2021 Speedway Under-21 World Championship and seventh in the 2021 Team Speedway Junior World Championship.

In 2022, Woentin rode for Dackarna in the Swedish Eliserien (the highest league in Sweden).
