= Celina Liebmann =

German motorcycle speedway rider

- Born: 2001 (age 24–25); Wasserburg am Inn, Germany
- Nationality: German

Career history

Germany
- 2022: Olching
- 2022: Berghaupten

Poland
- 2020–2021: Wittsock

Great Britain
- 2024: Workington Comets

Celina Liebmann (born 2001) is a motorcycle speedway rider from Germany.

== Biography ==
Liebmann, born in Wasserburg am Inn, grew up in a speedway family because her father Jürgen Liebmann was an ice speedway racer. She initially rode through the classes of 125cc and 250cc, winning the 250cc German Championship in 2016. She moved up to 500 cc in 2019 and in 2022, became the first woman to compete in a Speedway Under-21 World Championship event, when she rode in a round of the 2022 SGP2.

In December 2023, Liebmann made history by becoming the first woman to sign for a British speedway team, when agreeing a deal with the Workington Comets for the SGB Championship 2024 season.
