= Gustav Grahn =

Swedish speedway rider

- Born: 1 January 2004 (age 22); Sweden
- Nationality: Swedish

Career history

Sweden
- 2020-2023: Indianerna

Poland
- 2022: Rzeszów
- 2023: Daugavpils

Individual honours
- 2021: Swedish U21 champion

Gustav Grahn (born 1 January 2004) is a speedway rider from Sweden.

== Speedway career ==
Grahn became the Swedish Under 21 champion in 2021. He represented Sweden at senior level in the 2022 Speedway of Nations 2 final. Also in 2022, he finished 13th in the final standings of the 2022 SGP2.

In 2022, Grahn rode for Indianerna in Sweden but decided to a take a break in 2023.

== Family ==
Grahn's older brother Jonatan is also a professional speedway rider.
