= Jaimon Lidsey =

Australian motorcycle racer

- Born: 27 February 1999 (age 27); Mildura, Victoria, Australia
- Nationality: Australian

Career history

Great Britain
- 2019, 2023–2025: Belle Vue Aces

Poland
- 2018–2023: Leszno
- 2024-2025: Grudziadz

Sweden
- 2021–2022: Västervik
- 2023: Smederna
- 2024: Lejonen
- 2025: Vargarna

Denmark
- 2019: Grindsted

Individual honours
- 2020: World Under-21 champion
- 2018, 2023, 2025: Victorian champion

Team honours
- 2024: British league champion

Jaimon Lidsey (born 27 February 1999) is an Australian motorcycle speedway rider. He won the Under-21 World Championship in 2020.

== Career ==
Lidsey came to prominence after winning the Australian Under-21 Individual Speedway Championship in 2018, which he then successfully defended in 2019.

In 2019, Lidsey rode in the highest tier of the British speedway leagues for the first time for Belle Vue Aces in the SGB Premiership 2019.

Lidsey became the world-U21 world champion in 2020. This was the same year that Lidsey began to make an impact in the Polish leagues for Unia Leszno.

In 2023, Lidsey returned to action for Belle Vue Aces for the SGB Premiership 2023. He also rode in the 2023 Peter Craven Memorial and was part of the Australian team that finished fourth in the 2023 Speedway World Cup final.

Lidsey re-signed for Belle Vue for the 2024 season and was an integral part of the team that secured the league title. Lidsey secured a lucrative contract with Polish club Grudziadz for the 2024 Polish speedway season. In December 2024, he won his third Victorian Individual Speedway Championship.

He returned to Grudziadz for the 2025 Polish speedway season. and once again signed to ride for Belle Vue in the SGB Premiership.
