= Kevin Juhl Pedersen =

Danish speedway rider

- Born: 5 September 2001 (age 25); Denmark
- Nationality: Danish

Career history

Denmark
- 2021–2023: Grindsted
- 2024–2025: Holsted

Poland
- 2022–2023: Daugavpils
- 2024: Opole
- 2025: Landshut

Sweden
- 2021, 2023–2025: Vargarna
- 2022: Rospiggarna

Individual honours
- 2022: Danish Junior championship silver

Team honours
- 2022: Team Junior European Championship silver

Kevin Juhl Pedersen (born 5 September 2001) is a Danish speedway rider.

== Speedway career ==
Juhl Pedersen came to prominence in 2022, when he won two silver medals at the Danish Under 21 Individual Speedway Championship and the 2022 Team Speedway Junior European Championship. He also finished sixth in the World U21 final at the 2022 SGP2 and fifth at the World U21 Team Championships at the 2022 Speedway of Nations 2.

During 2022, Juhl Pedersen rode for club speedway for Lokomotiv Daugavpils in Poland and Rospiggarna in Sweden and Grindsted in Denmark. He remained with Grindsted for 2023 and in 2024 won the bronze medal at the 2024 European Under 23 Team Speedway Championship.
