= France national speedway team =

Motorcycle speedway national team from France

France
- Association: French Motorcycle Federation; Fédération Française de Motocyclisme
- FIM code: FFM
- Nation colour: Blue, White and Red
- SWC wins: 0 Best result Speedway of Nations (5th, 2021)

The France national speedway team is one of the nations who compete in international motorcycle speedway and is controlled by the French Motorcycling Federation.

== History ==
The French speedway team were latecomers to the Speedway World Team Cup, missing the first three decades of the event before competing for the first time during the 1991 Speedway World Team Cup, finishing fourth in Group D (the fourth tier of the competition).

The team was one of the weaker nations and struggled to compete against the established nations. From 2001 (when the competition was rebranded as the Speedway World Cup) to 2011, France either failed to qualify for the second stage or did not enter a team due to the lack of competitive riders. The team began to improve their world ranking and reappeared in qualifying in 2012 and then nine years later in 2021, competing in the Speedway of Nations they reached their first major final.

== Major world finals ==
=== Speedway of Nations ===
Year	Venue	Standings (Pts)	Riders	Pts
2021	(England); Manchester; National Speedway Stadium	1. (United Kingdom) Great Britain (64+6+5); 2. Poland (74+4); 3. Denmark (68+3); 4. Australia (49); 5. France (47); 6. Latvia (42); 7. Sweden (30)	David Bellego	34
2021	(England); Manchester; National Speedway Stadium	1. (United Kingdom) Great Britain (64+6+5); 2. Poland (74+4); 3. Denmark (68+3); 4. Australia (49); 5. France (47); 6. Latvia (42); 7. Sweden (30)	Dimitri Bergé	13
2021	(England); Manchester; National Speedway Stadium	1. (United Kingdom) Great Britain (64+6+5); 2. Poland (74+4); 3. Denmark (68+3); 4. Australia (49); 5. France (47); 6. Latvia (42); 7. Sweden (30)	Steven Goret	0

== International caps (as of 2022) ==
Since the advent of the Speedway Grand Prix era, international caps earned by riders is largely restricted to international competitions, whereas previously test matches between two teams were a regular occurrence. This means that the number of caps earned by a rider has decreased in the modern era.

Rider	Caps
Barraud, Jeremy	1
Bellego, David	
Bergé, Dimitri	
Bergé, Philippe	3
Boun, Thierry	
Cigana, Christian	
De Biasi, Richard	
Dubernaud, Christophe	
Dubernaud, Jordan	
Georgese, Jerome	
Goret, Steven	
Ianotto, Christian	
Muratet, Xavier	
Ochocki, David	
Ostyn, Fabrice	
Stella, Gaetan	
Trésarrieu, Mathias	
Trésarrieu, Mathieu	2
Trésarrieu, Sebastien	2
Trésarrieu, Stéphane	7

== See also ==
- France national under-21 speedway team
- France national under-19 speedway team
- France national long track team
