= Wiktor Przyjemski =

Polish speedway rider

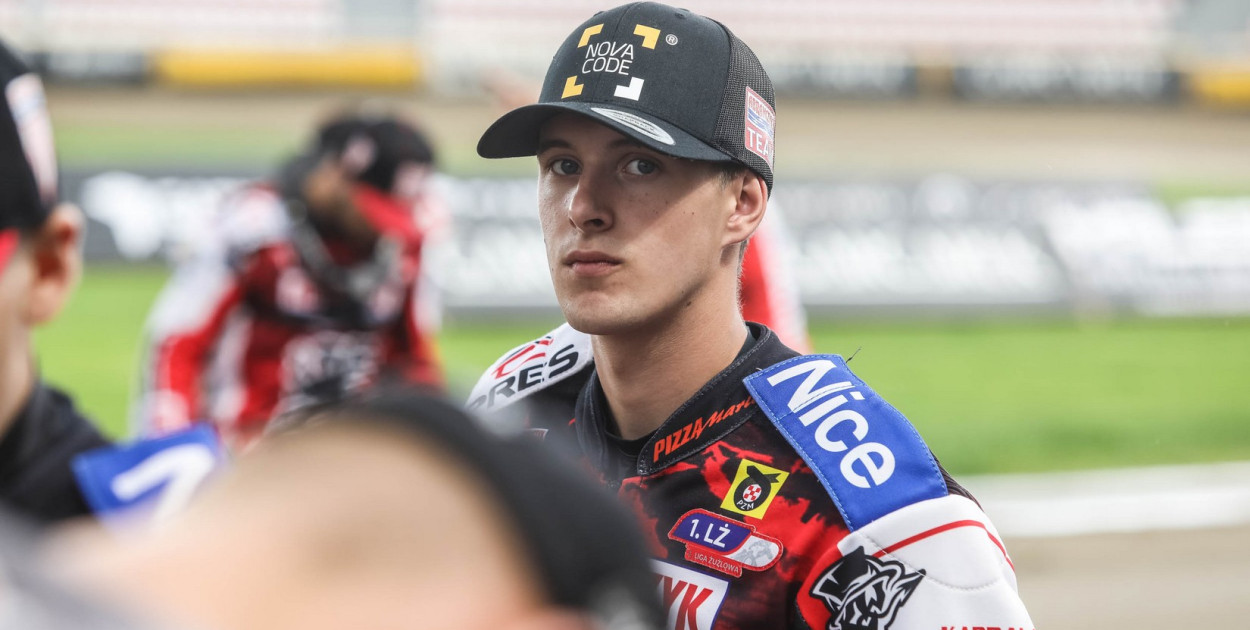
- Image of Wiktor Przyjemski
- Born: 23 May 2005 (age 21); Bydgoszcz, Poland
- Nationality: Polish

Career history

Poland
- 2021–2023: Bydgoszcz
- 2022: Rawicz
- 2024–2025: Lublin
- 2026-: Bydgoszcz

Sweden
- 2023–2025: Rospiggarna
- 2026: Vargarna

Individual honours
- 2024: World U21 champion
- 2023: European Junior champion

Team honours
- 2022, 2023, 2024: World U21 Team champion
- 2024, 2025: European Team champion
- 2023, 2024: European U23 champion
- 2024: Polish Champions

Wiktor Przyjemski (born 23 May 2005) is an international speedway rider from Poland.

== Speedway career ==
Przyjemski came to prominence in 2022, when he was part of the Polish team that won the World U23 Championship.

During 2021 and 2022, Przyjemski rode for Bydgoszcz in the Ekstraliga and in 2022 for Kolejarz Rawicz in the Polish Speedway Second League. In 2023, he rode for Rospiggarna in the Elitserien. In 2023, he helped Poland qualify for the final of the 2023 European Team Speedway Championship.

In 2023, Przyjemski won his second Team Speedway Under-21 World Championship, winning the 2023 Speedway of Nations 2. He also won 2023 Team Speedway Junior European Championship and the 2023 European Junior Championship in Gorzów Wielkopolski, on 19 August.

In 2024, Przyjemski rode for Motor Lublin in the Speedway Ekstraliga and won the European Team Speedway Championship. Also in 2024, he qualified for the final series of the 2024 SGP2 (the World U21 Championship). He subsequently won the first race of three in the final series. Also in 2024, he helped Poland win the Under-21 Team World Championship in Manchester.

Przyjemski won a second successive gold medal at the 2024 European Under 23 Team Speedway Championship before becoming the 2024 World U21 champion. Przyjemski won the bronze medal at the 2024 U19 European Championship and helped Lublin win the Ekstraliga during the 2024 Polish speedway season.
