= Speedway Lublin =

Polish motorcycle speedway team

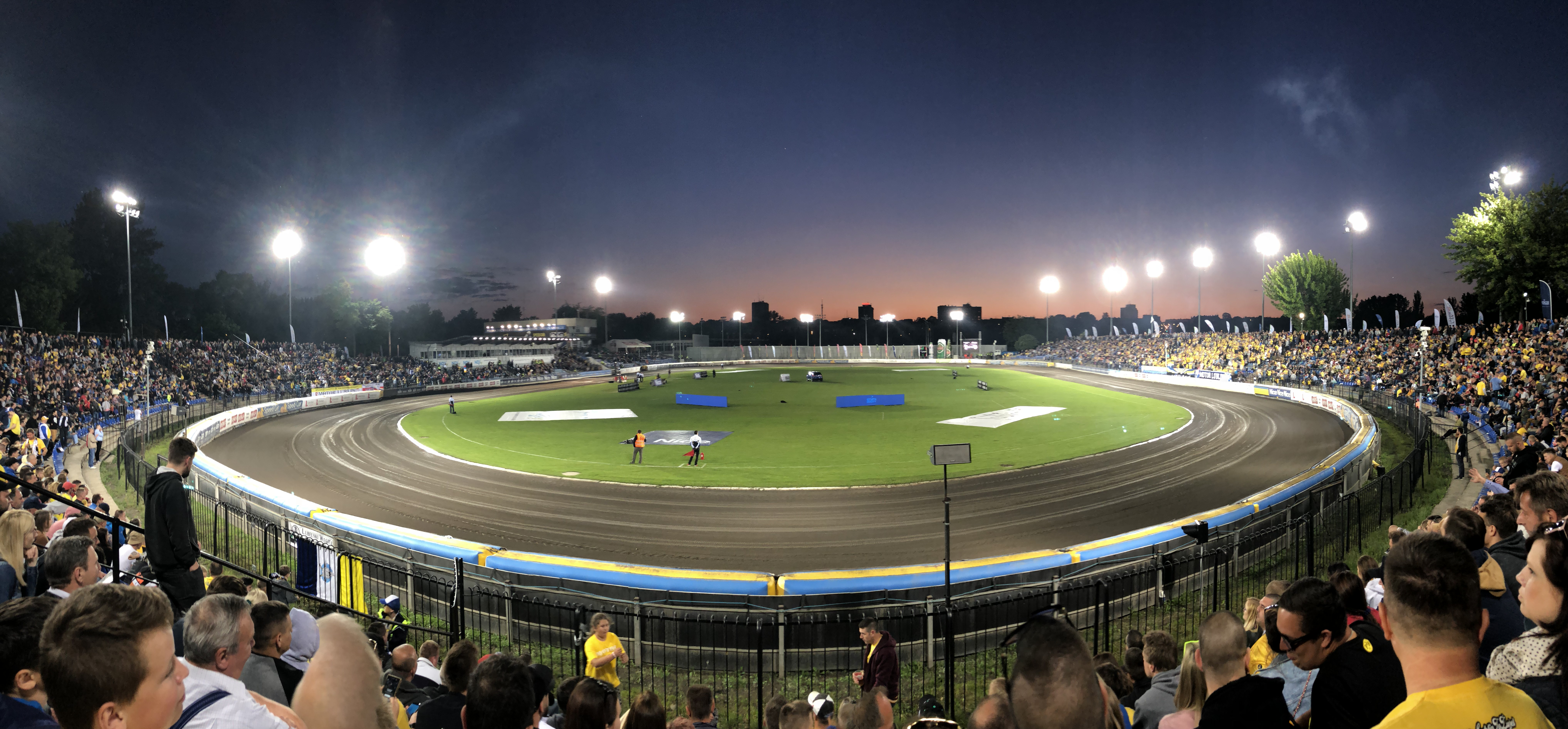
- Motor vs. Wanda Kraków at al. Zygmuntowskie on 20 May 2018

Club information
- Track address: Stadion MOSiR Bystrzyca; Lublin
- Country: Poland
- Founded: 2017
- Team manager: Maciej Kuciapa
- Team captain: Bartosz Zmarzlik
- League: Ekstraliga
- Website: Official Website

Club facts
- Colours: Yellow, White and Blue
- Track size: 382 metres (1,253 ft)
- Track record time: 64.52 seconds
- Track record date: 21 September 2024
- Track record holder: Bartosz Bańbor

Major team honours
| Team champions | 2022, 2023, 2024 |
| Pairs champions | 2022, 2023, 2024, 2025, 2026 |

Speedway Lublin also known as the Orlen Oil Motor Lublin for sponsorship reasons, is a Polish motorcycle speedway team based in Lublin. The team currently competes in the Ekstraliga (the highest division) and have won the Team Speedway Polish Championship three times.

== History ==
In 2017, at the initiative of members of the Cross Motor Club (KM Cross), the speedway team in Lublin was reactivated and began competing in the Polish Speedway Second League (2. liga). In the 2017 season Motor finished second in 2. liga, and reached the play-off final where they were defeated by Start Gniezno. The final was contested over two legs, one at each participating club's stadium (50:40 in Lublin, 36:53 in Gniezno). Despite losing to Start, Motor qualified for the two-game relegation-promotion playoff against the second-last place team in Nice 1. Liga – Stal Rzeszów. The first game took place on 1 October 2017 in Rzeszów, with Motor winning 52:38. Motor won the deciding game 47:25 which took place on 8 October 2017 in Lublin.

Motor Lublin ended first half of the 2018 season in first place, three points ahead of Start Gniezno. Motor finished first in the Nice 1. Liga regular season, and faced Lokomotiv Daugavpils in the play-off semi-finals. On 31 August 2018, Motor won the away leg 47:43. In the second leg, which took place on 8 September 2018 in Lublin, Motor won 55:35. In the play-off finals, Motor faced second placed side ROW Rybnik. The first leg took place on 16 September 2018 in Rybnik, which Motor lost 52:38. The return leg was contested one week later, when Motor beat ROW 53:37, and gained promotion to Ekstraliga.

In 2022, the team won the Ekstraliga and were awarded the gold medal and declared Team Speedway Polish Championship winners.

In 2023, the club signed a contract with then 3-times world champion Bartosz Zmarzlik and won the Ekstraliga during the 2023 Polish speedway season and 2024 Polish speedway seasons to record three consecutive title wins.

== Notable riders ==
- (Poland) Mateusz Cierniak
- (Poland) Jarosław Hampel
- (Australia) Jack Holder
- (Poland) Dominik Kubera
- (Sweden) Freddie Lindgren
- (Denmark) Mikkel Michelsen
- (Poland) Bartosz Zmarzlik

== See also ==
- Motor Lublin (speedway team)
