= Daniils Kolodinskis =

Latvian speedway rider

- Born: 20 November 2000 (age 26); Daugavpils, Latvia
- Nationality: Latvian

Career history

Poland
- 2017–2025: Daugavpils

Sweden
- 2025: Piraterna

Speedway Grand Prix statistics
- Starts: 1
- Finalist: 0 times
- Winner: 0 times

Individual honours
- 2020, 2022: Latvian Championship bronze
- 2024: Latvian Championship silver

Team honours
- 2021: Team Speedway Junior European Championship bronze
- 2025: European Pairs Speedway Championship silver

Daniils Kolodinskis (born 20 November 2000) is a Latvian motorcycle speedway rider.

== Career ==
Kolodinskis came to prominence when reaching the final of the 2019 Individual Speedway Junior European Championship. He represented the Latvian U21 team during the 2020 and 2021 World Junior Championships.

Kolodinskis won a bronze medal in the Team Speedway Junior European Championship and won two bronze medals in the Latvian Individual Speedway Championship in 2020 and 2022. He was a finalist in the 2021 Speedway Under-21 World Championship and represented the Latvia national speedway team in the 2022 European Pairs Speedway Championship and the 2023 European Team Speedway Championship.

In the Polish leagues, Kolodinskis has ridden for Lokomotiv Daugavpils since 2017.

In 2024, Kolodinskis helped Latvia reach the final of the 2024 Speedway of Nations in Manchester.

== Major results ==
=== World individual Championship ===
- 2024 Speedway Grand Prix - =25th

=== World team Championships ===
- 2024 Speedway of Nations - 7th

== See also ==
- Latvia national speedway team
- List of Speedway Grand Prix riders
