= Paul Greifzu Stadium (Stralsund) =

Stadium in Stralsund, Germany

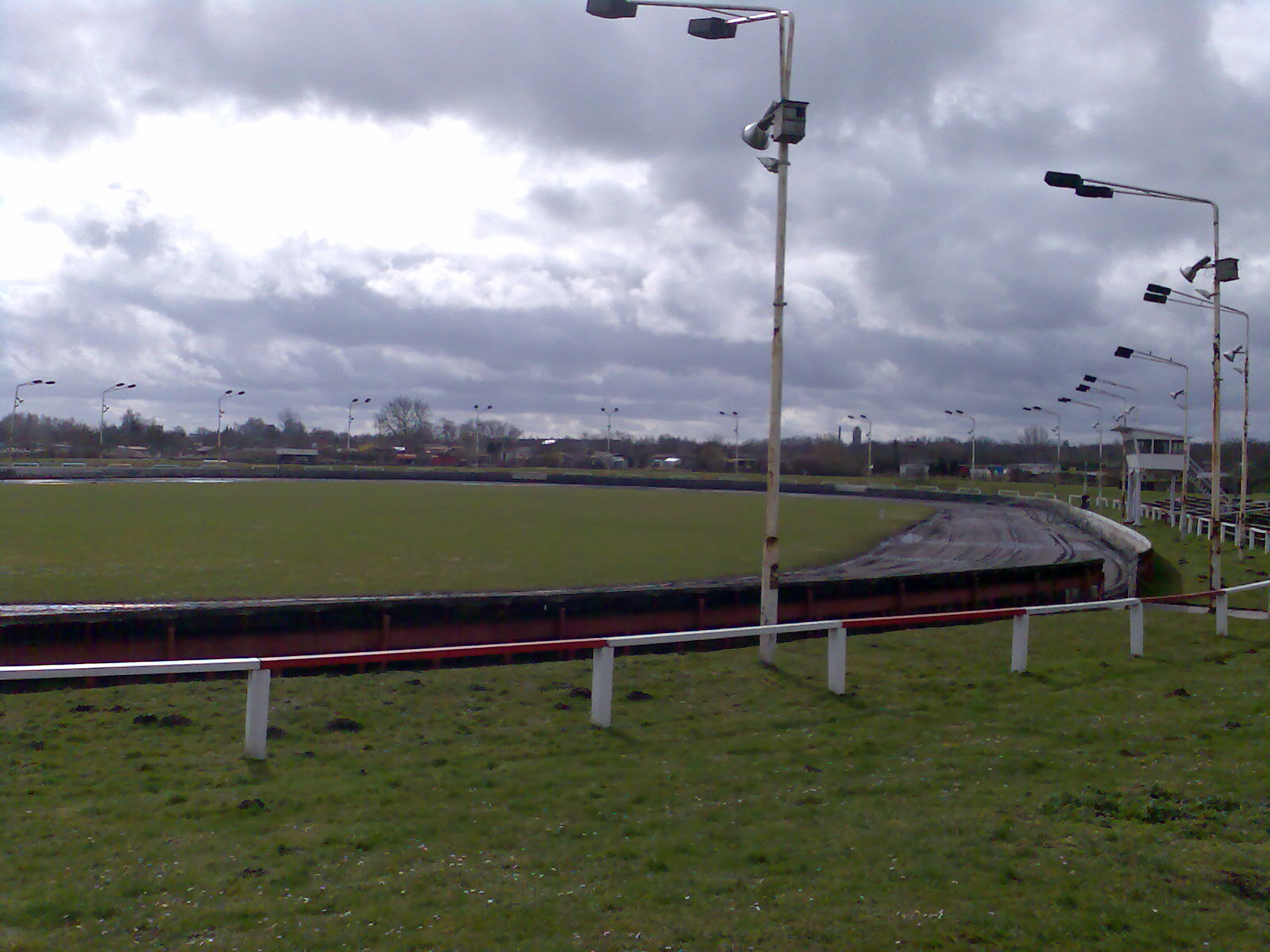
- Interactive map of Paul Greifzu Stadium
- Location: Barther Str. 58, 18437 Stralsund, Germany
- Coordinates: 54°18′47″N 13°03′14″E
- Capacity: 20,000
- Field size: 385 metres

Construction
- Opened: 6 July 1958

Paul Greifzu Stadium (German: Paul Greifzu Stadion) is a multi-purpose stadium (primarily motorcycle speedway) in Stralsund, Germany. The stadium is located on the western side of the city, off the Barther Straße. The MC Nordstern Stralsund e.V use the facility.

== History ==
In 1957, construction began on the stadium, organised by the city council with lottery funds. The following year in April 1958, the Stralsund Speedway Club was founded and the stadium opened by Mayor Motczinski on 6 July 1958 with an attendance of 20,000. The name came from a car racing driver called Paul Greifzu who died in a race Dessau in 1952.

The stadium has been a significant venue for motorcycle speedway and hosted important events. These included a qualifying round of the 1968 Speedway World Team Cup and a qualifying round of the Speedway World Championship in 1969.

MC Nordster rider Hartmut Ernst won the East German Individual Speedway Championship in 1977 and the track held the final rounds of the national individual and team Championships many times.

The team based at the stadium won the German Team Speedway Championship in 2015 and 2022.

In recent years the stadium continues to hold major events, which have included the 2016 Team Speedway Junior European Championship final, a final round of the 2021 Speedway Under-21 World Championship and the 2023 European Team Speedway Championship final.

On 22 April 2023, the 385 metre track record was broken by Dominik Kubera, who recorded 66.47 sec.

== Gallery ==
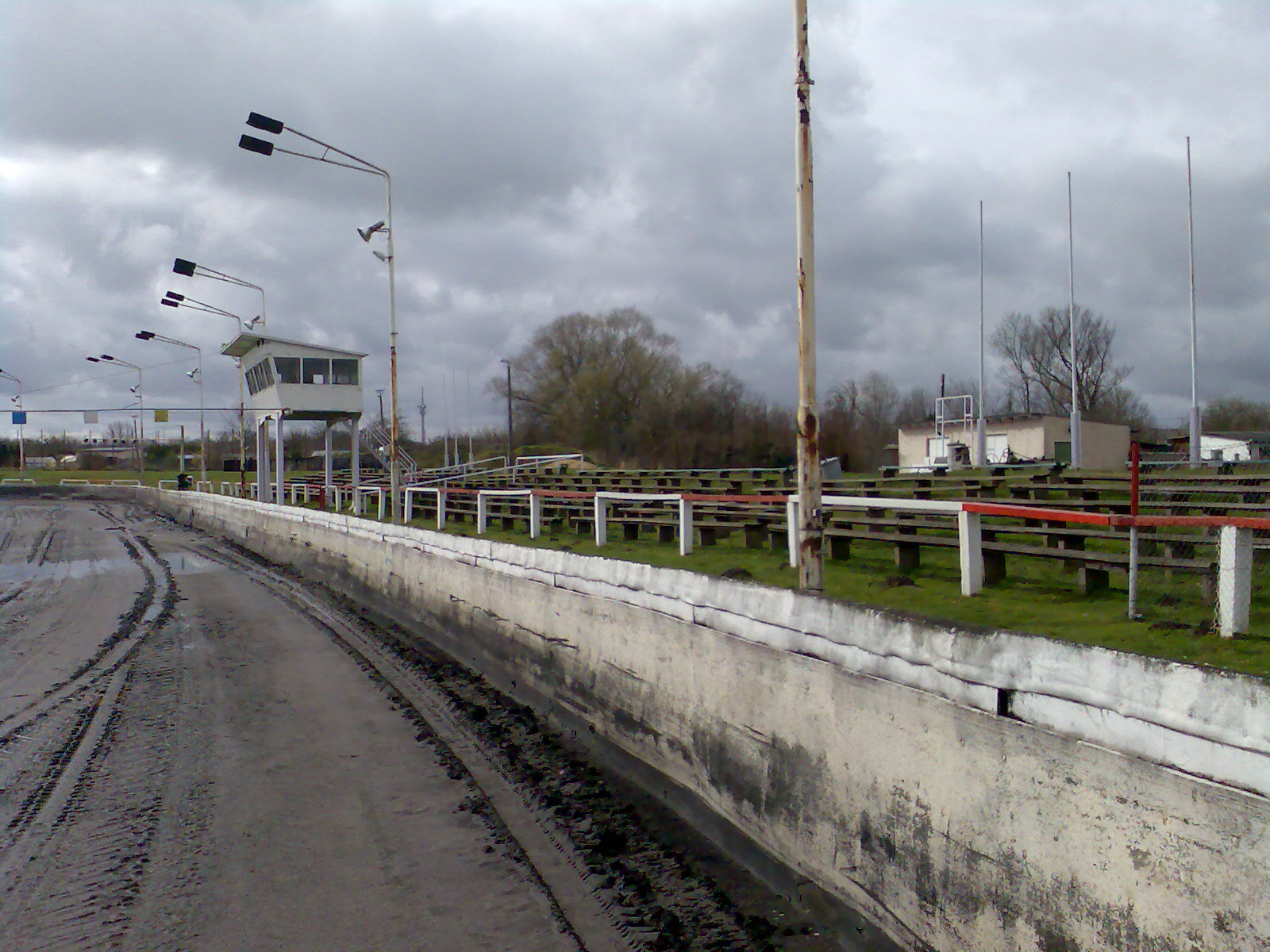

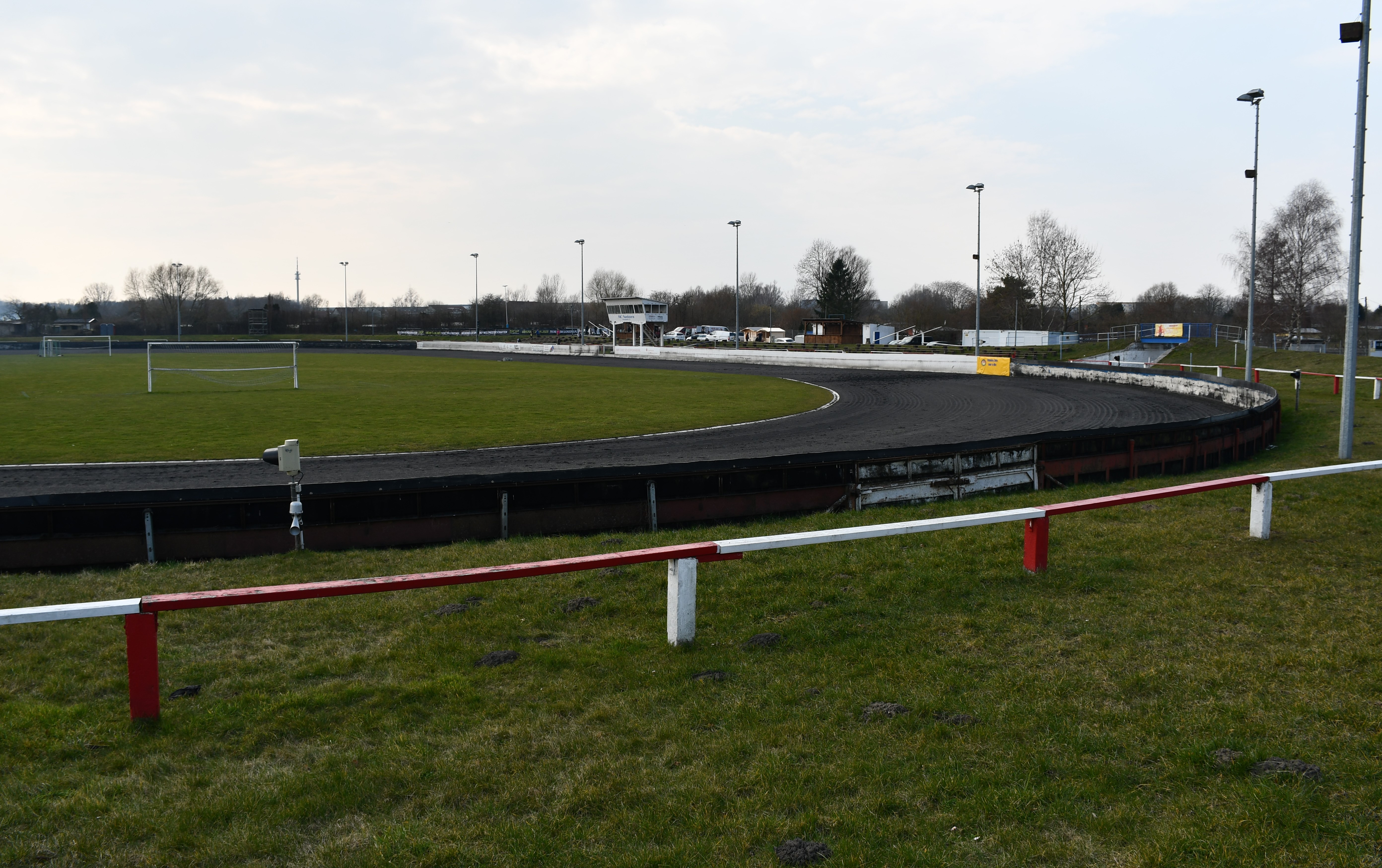

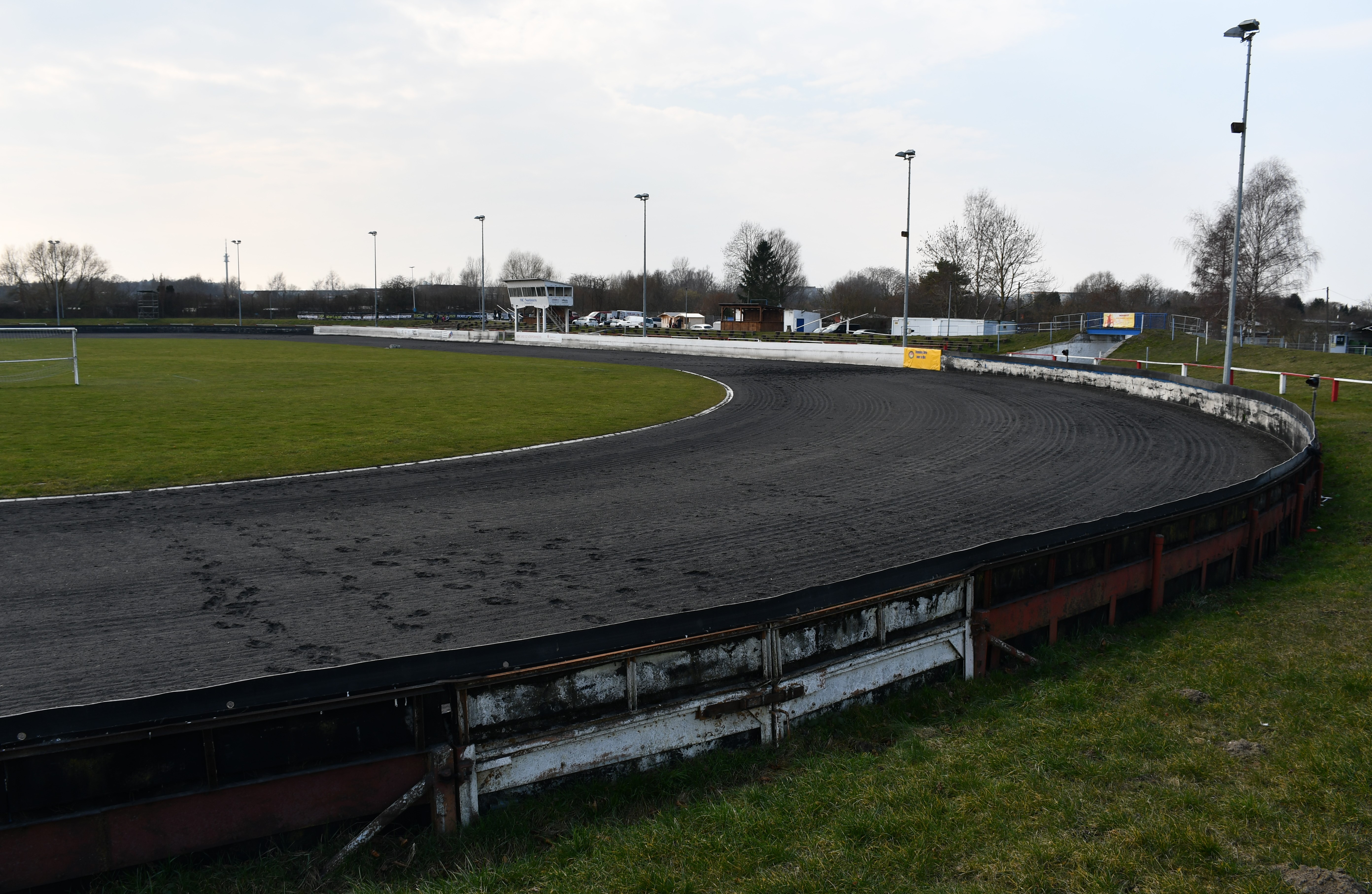
