= Keynan Rew =

Australian speedway rider (born 2003)

- Born: 2 April 2003 (age 23); Nambour, Queensland, Australia
- Nationality: Australian

Career history

Great Britain
- 2023–2024: Ipswich
- 2025: Birmingham

Denmark
- 2018: Slangerup
- 2022: Region Varde
- 2024: SES

Poland
- 2019-2021: Rawicz
- 2022, 2024, 2026, 2027: Leszno
- 2022: Krosno
- 2023: Gdańsk
- 2025: Rzeszów

Individual honours
- 2022: Australian Under-21 Champion

Team honours
- 2024: U21 team world bronze
- 2023: Knockout Cup

Keynan Rew (born 2003) is an international speedway rider from Australia.

== Speedway career ==
Rew took up riding at the age of seven and his father Dwayne set up a club called the Ipswich "Switches" at Willowbank.

In 2021, Rew helped Australia qualify for the final of the 2021 Speedway of Nations (the World team Championships of speedway). In 2022, he helped Wilki Krosno win the 2022 1.Liga.

Rew won the 2022 Australian Under-21 Individual Speedway Championship.

Rew was always destined to ride one day for the Ipswich Witches in Britain and in 2023, he signed for the East Anglian club for the SGB Premiership 2023, where he helped the club win the Knockout Cup. In 2024, he helped Australia win the bronze medal at the Under-21 Team World Championship in Manchester and remained with Ipswich for the 2024 season.

Rew signed for Birmingham Brummies for the SGB Premiership 2025.
