= Wiktor Lampart =

Polish motorcycle speedway rider

- Born: 21 May 2001 (age 25); Rzeszów, Poland
- Nationality: Polish

Career history

Poland
- 2019–2022: Lublin
- 2023–2024: Toruń
- 2025: Częstochowa

Denmark
- 2024: Holsted

Great Britain
- 2024: Birmingham

Individual honours
- 2019: European Junior Champion

Team honours
- 2021: Team Junior World Championship

Wiktor Lampart (born 21 May 2001) is an international speedway rider from Poland.

== Speedway career ==
Lampart became the European Junior Champion after winning the 2019 Individual Speedway Junior European Championship. He had previously won the silver medal in 2018.

In 2021, Lampart won the gold medal at the Team Junior World Championship with Jakub Miśkowiak. In 2022, he finished in fourth place during the World Under-21 Championship in the 2022 SGP2. Also in 2022, he helped Lublin win the 2022 Ekstraliga.

Lampart signed for Birmingham Brummies for the SGB Premiership 2024 season. It was his first British speedway club. In Poland he joined KS Toruń where he rode in 2023 and 2024.
