= Benjamin Basso =

Danish speedway rider

- Born: 2 July 2001 (age 25); Odense, Denmark
- Nationality: Danish

Career history

Denmark
- 2018–2021, 2024–2025: Fjelsted
- 2022–2023: SES

Great Britain
- 2021: Poole
- 2022-2023: Peterborough
- 2022-2023: Glasgow
- 2024: King's Lynn

Poland
- 2022–2023: Bydgoszcz
- 2024: Łódź
- 2025: Gdańsk

Individual honours
- 2022: Danish U21 champion

Team honours
- 2021, 2023: League winners
- 2021: Knockout Cup
- 2023: SGB Championship Pairs

Benjamin Basso (born 2 July 2001) is a Danish motorcycle speedway rider.

== Speedway career ==
Basso, who was a World Youth champion was signed by Poole Pirates during the SGB Championship 2021 season as a replacement for Ondřej Smetana, who had failed to join the team due to travel issues. The move contributed to a highly successful season for the Pirates as they won the league and Knockout Cup double.

In 2022, Basso rode for the Peterborough Panthers in the SGB Premiership 2022 and for the Glasgow Tigers in the SGB Championship 2022. The move from Poole to Peterborough upset the Poole managers Matt and Dan Ford because they said that they had assisted Basso with his work permit and arranged a contract around Basso's Danish racing commitments. However Basso stated that the clash of race days was unmanageable. Also in 2022, he finished in 5th place during the World Under-21 Championship in the 2022 SGP2. Also in 2022, he helped SES win the 2022 Danish Super League.

In 2023, Basso re-signed for both Peterborough in the SGB Premiership 2023 and Glasgow in the SGB Championship 2023, where he won the league title and the Championship pairs.

In 2024, Basso signed for King's Lynn Stars and won the bronze medal at the 2024 European Under 23 Team Speedway Championship.

== Major results ==
=== World individual Championship ===
- 2023 Speedway Grand Prix - 23rd
