= Jacob Thorssell =

Swedish speedway rider (born 1993)

- Born: 24 July 1993 (age 33); Åtvidaberg, Sweden
- Nationality: Swedish
- Website: Official website

Career history

Sweden
- 2013–2014: Vetlanda
- 2016–2018: Rospiggarna
- 2019–2022: Dackarna
- 2023–2025: Västervik

Denmark
- 2012: Fjelsted
- 2022, 2024–2025: Holsted

Great Britain
- 2012–2019: Wolverhampton

Poland
- 2014: Tarnów
- 2015: Gniezo
- 2016: Częstochowa
- 2017–2018: Zielona Góra
- 2019–2020: Gdańsk
- 2021–2022: Opole
- 2023–2025: Rzeszów

Speedway Grand Prix statistics
- Starts: 2
- Podiums: 0 (0-0-0)
- Finalist: 0 times
- Winner: 0 times

Individual honours
- 2019, 2020: Swedish Champion
- 2016: Wolverhampton Olympique

Team honours
- 2025: Swedish champions

Jacob Thorssell (born 24 July 1993) is a motorcycle speedway rider from Sweden. He is a two times Swedish national champion.

== Career ==
Thorssell joined Wolverhampton Wolves in the Elite League for the 2012 season, as a replacement for Pontus Aspgren who had picked up an injury. After impressing at Wolves, Thorssell was announced in the permanent line-up for the 2013 season.

After continuing to impress in 2013 and also in 2014, Thorssell made the step up to being one of Wolverhampton's three heat leaders for the 2015 season, and was the first rider to be announced in their team.In 2016 he won the Wolverhampton Olympique but in 2017, he broke a bone in his lower back riding for the Wolves.

Thorssell remained at Wolves for eight seasons until the end of the 2019 season. From 2021 to 2022, he rode for Opole in the Polish leagues and since 2019 has ridden for Dackarna in his home country. Thorssell was Swedish national champion after winning the Swedish Individual Speedway Championship in both 2019 and 2020.

In 2023, Thorssell was part of the Swedish team that competed at the 2023 Speedway World Cup in Poland. In 2024, he helped Sweden secure a bronze medal at the 2024 Speedway of Nations in Manchester. Thorssell ended his 2024 season by just missing out on qualification for the 2025 Speedway Grand Prix by finishing fifth in the 2025 GP Challenge.

In 2025, Thorssell helped Västervik win the Elitserien.

== Major results ==
=== World individual Championship ===
- 2023 Speedway Grand Prix - 19th
- 2024 Speedway of Nations - 3rd
