= Jevgeņijs Kostigovs =

Latvian speedway rider

- Born: November 20, 1996 (age 30); Daugavpils, Latvia
- Nationality: Latvian

Career history

Poland
- 2013–2025: Daugavpils

Speedway Grand Prix statistics
- Starts: 1
- Finalist: 0 times
- Winner: 0 times

Individual honours
- 2018: Latvian national champion

Jevgeņijs Kostigovs (born 20 November 1996) is a Latvian motorcycle speedway rider.

== Career ==
Kostigovs became champion of Latvia in 2018 after winning the Latvian Individual Speedway Championship.

Kostigovs has won silver and bronze medals at the European Pairs Speedway Championship and was selected for the Latvian team for the 2019 Speedway of Nations and 2022 Speedway of Nations. He reached the final of the 2020 Grand Prix Challenge.

In 2024, Kostigovs helped Latvia reach the final of the 2024 Speedway of Nations in Manchester and qualified for the final of the 2024 Speedway European Championship.

== Major results ==
=== World individual Championship ===
- 2025 Speedway Grand Prix - 21st

=== World team Championships ===
- 2019 Speedway of Nations - =11th
- 2022 Speedway of Nations - =9th
- 2024 Speedway of Nations - 7th

== See also ==
- Latvian national speedway team
