= Mathias Trésarrieu =

French speedway rider

- Born: 7 December 2002 (age 23); France
- Nationality: French

Career history

France
- 2022: Morizes

Team honours
- 2022: Team Long Track World Championship bronze

Mathias Trésarrieu (born 7 December 2002) is an international motorcycle speedway rider from France.

== Career ==
Trésarrieu rode in the 2019 Team Speedway Junior European Championship final.

Trésarrieu came to prominence in 2022, when he won the bronze medal at the 2022 Team Long Track World Championship.

In 2023, Trésarrieu was part of the French team that competed at the 2023 Speedway World Cup in Poland and was called up into the French squad for the 2024 Speedway of Nations.

== Family ==
Trésarrieu is the son of Stéphane Trésarrieu and the nephew of Mathieu Trésarrieu and Sebastien Trésarrieu.
