= Rasmus Jensen (speedway rider) =

Danish speedway rider

- Born: 16 October 1993 (age 33); Holsted, Denmark
- Nationality: Danish

Career history

Denmark
- 2012–2025: Holsted

Great Britain
- 2013–2014: Plymouth Devils
- 2015: Somerset Rebels
- 2016, 2018: Workington Comets
- 2019: Glasgow Tigers
- 2019: Swindon Robins

Sweden
- 2019–2020: Rospiggarna
- 2015, 2021–2025: Dackarna

Poland
- 2022: Gdańsk
- 2023–2025: Zielona Góra

Speedway Grand Prix statistics
- Starts: 3
- Finalist: 0 times
- Winner: 0 times

Individual honours
- 2022: Danish champion
- 2024: Golden Helmet of Pardubice

Team honours
- 2023: Speedway World Cup bronze
- 2022, 2024: European Pairs champion
- 2019: SGB Championship Pairs
- 2023: Swedish Eliserien champion

Rasmus Jensen is a Danish motorcycle speedway rider. He was the 2022 champion of Denmark.

== Career ==
Jensen's career began in the year 2001. His first season in British racing was with Plymouth in 2013; at the end of the season, his official average was 7. At the end of the following 2014 Premier League season, his average was 6.14, and he was in fourth place among the Plymouth Devils riders' averages. Jensen completed 2016 with a 6.14 average and completed 2018 with a 6.59 average.

Jensen spent 2019 with the Second Division club Glasgow Tigers and reached an official average of 8.34, making his average the second highest on the team, behind Craig Cook. In 2019, he won the SGB Championship Pairs partnering Craig Cook, during the SGB Championship 2019 season. Jensen scored a total of three race wins on the night. The Speedway Star stated, "Cami [Brown] also heaped praise on Cookie's race partner Jensen and can be well satisfied that he insisted on chasing his signature during the build-up to the new season last winter.

During 2019, the Premiership club Swindon brought in Jensen following a guest performance. He achieved a Premiership average of 7.7, third highest on the team. The Speedway Star rated Rasmus Jensen Premiership "Rider of the Week" and stated, "at this stage the introduction of Jensen must stand as the biggest and best move of 2019."

Jensen re-signed for Swindon in 2020 but he chose not be a part of the Glasgow Tigers team in 2020 due to Grand Prix commitments.

Jensen finished in 17th place following just one appearance during the 2022 Speedway World Championship, he securing 12 points during the Danish Grand Prix as part of the 2022 Speedway Grand Prix. However, his biggest success of the season and his career to date came in June 2022, when he won the 2022 Danish Individual Speedway Championship. In 2023, he was part of the Danish team that won the bronze medal in the 2023 Speedway World Cup final; he topped scored for the Danish team in the final.

In 2024, Jensen helped Denmark reach the final of the 2024 Speedway of Nations in Manchester and won his second European Pairs title.

== Major results ==
=== World individual Championship ===
- 2022 Speedway Grand Prix - 17th
- 2023 Speedway Grand Prix - =19th
- 2024 Speedway Grand Prix - 19th

=== World team Championships ===
- 2023 Speedway World Cup - 3rd
- 2024 Speedway of Nations - 6th
