= Anže Grmek =

Slovenian speedway rider (born 2005)

- Born: October 12, 2004 (age 22); Slovenia
- Nationality: Slovenian

Career history

Poland
- 2023–2025: Rzeszów

Individual honours
- 2021: Slovenian national runner-up

Anže Grmek (born 12 October 2004) is a Slovenian motorcycle speedway rider.

== Career ==
Grmek was selected for the Slovenian team for the 2021 Speedway of Nations and 2022 Speedway of Nations. In 2022, he reached the final of the 2022 Individual Speedway Junior European Championship.

Grmek competed in the 2023 World under 21 Championship.

== Major results ==
=== World team Championships ===
- 2021 Speedway of Nations - =11th
- 2022 Speedway of Nations - =9th

== See also ==
- Slovenia national speedway team
