= Daniel Klíma =

Czech speedway rider

- Born: 30 December 2002 (age 23); Czech Republic
- Nationality: Czech

Career history

Czech Republic
- 2022: Praha

Poland
- 2022: Gorzów
- 2023: Tarnów

Individual honours
- 2020: European U19 Championship bronze
- 2023: Czech Republic Individual bronze

Team honours
- 2024: European U23 Championship silver

Daniel Klíma (born 30 December 2002) is a Czech speedway rider. He is a member of the Czech Republic national speedway team.

== Speedway career ==
Klíma won the bronze medal at the 2020 European U19 Championship. The following year, he made two appearances in the World Championship season during the 2021 Speedway Grand Prix.

Klíma competed in the final of the 2021 Speedway Under-21 World Championship and finished 18th in the final standings of the 2022 SGP2.

In 2022, Klíma rode for Gorzów U24 in Poland. In 2023, he was part of the Czech team that competed at the 2023 Speedway World Cup in Poland. and later in the season won the bronze medal at the Czech Republic Individual Championship.

Klíma rode for the Czech Republic during the 2024 Speedway of Nations (world team championship) and won the silver medal at the 2024 European Under 23 Team Speedway Championship.

Klíma signed for Championship side Plymouth Gladiators, in Great Britain, for the 2026 season.
