= Mateusz Cierniak =

Polish motorcycle speedway rider

- Born: 3 October 2002 (age 24); Tarnów, Poland
- Nationality: Polish

Career history

Poland
- 2021–2025: Lublin

Sweden
- 2023–2025: Lejonen

Denmark
- 2024–2025: Fjelsted

Speedway Grand Prix statistics
- Starts: 1
- Finalist: 0 times
- Winner: 0 times

Individual honours
- 2022, 2023: World Under-21 champion

Team honours
- 2022, 2023: Team world U21 champion
- 2019, 2020, 2022, 2023, 2024: Team European U23 champion
- 2022, 2023, 2024: Polish champions
- 2024: Swedish champions

Mateusz Cierniak (born on 3 October 2002) is an international speedway rider from Poland.

== Speedway career ==
In 2021, Cierniak finished second in the Krosno round of the World Under 21 Championship. He was denied the chance to compete for the title itself after only being allowed to compete in one of the three rounds because he was not listed as one of the original qualified riders.

Cierniak won the gold medal at the World Under-21 Championship in the 2022 SGP2 and the World U-21 Team Championship. Also in 2022, he helped Lublin win the 2022 Ekstraliga.

In 2023, Cierniak won his second Team Speedway Under-21 World Championship, winning the 2023 Speedway of Nations 2 and his fourth Team Speedway Junior European Championship.

Cierniak won a gold medal at the 2024 European Under 23 Team Speedway Championship for the fifth time. Also in 2024, he helped Lejonen win the Elitserien during the 2024 Swedish speedway season and helped Lublin win the Ekstraliga during the 2024 Polish speedway season.

== Major results ==
=== World individual Championship ===
- 2024 Speedway Grand Prix - =25th
