= Petr Chlupáč =

Czech speedway rider

- Born: 2002 (age 23–24); Třebusice, Czech Republic
- Nationality: Czech

Career history

Czech Rep
- 2022–2023: Prague

Poland
- 2022: KS Toruń
- 2022: Opole

Petr Chlupáč (born 2002) is a speedway rider from the Czech Republic.

== Speedway career ==
Chlupáč finished seventh in the 2021 European Pairs Speedway Championship, fifth in the 2021 Team Speedway Junior World Championship, and competed in the 2021 Individual Speedway Junior World Championship.

Also in 2021, Chlupáč competed as reserve rider in the 2021 Speedway Grand Prix. In 2022, he finished in seventh place during the World Under-21 Championship in the 2022 SGP2. In 2023, he was part of the Czech team that competed at the 2023 Speedway World Cup in Poland.
