= Steven Goret =

French speedway rider

- Born: 15 June 2001 (age 25); Marmande, France
- Nationality: French

Career history

Great Britain
- 2021: Plymouth Gladiators

Poland
- 2022-2023: Rawicz

Sweden
- 2023: Valsarna

Steven Goret (born 15 June 2001) is an international motorcycle speedway rider from France.

== Speedway career ==
In 2021, Goret helped France qualify for the final of the 2021 Speedway of Nations (the World team Championships of speedway). He competed in the 2021 Individual Speedway Junior World Championship.

Goret joined the Plymouth Gladiators for the SGB Championship 2021.

In 2023, Goret was part of the French team that competed at the 2023 Speedway World Cup in Poland and became the first Frenchman to win the U23 World Longtrack title.
