= Jakub Miśkowiak =

Polish speedway rider

- Born: 3 August 2001 (age 25); Wschowa, Poland
- Nationality: Polish

Career history

Poland
- 2019–2023: Częstochowa
- 2024: Gorzów
- 2025: Grudziadz

Sweden
- 2021–2023: Lejonen
- 2024–2025: Vargarna

Denmark
- 2024: Region Varde

Individual honours
- 2021: World U21 champion

Team honours
- 2021, 2022: Team Junior World champion
- 2017, 2019, 2020, 2021, 2022, 2023: Team Junior European champion

Jakub Miśkowiak (born 3 August 2001) is an international motorcycle speedway rider from Poland.

== Speedway career ==
In 2021, Miśkowiak won the gold medal at the Team Junior World Championship with Wiktor Lampart and then won the World Under 21 Championship after winning two of the three rounds.

In 2022, Miśkowiak won the bronze medal at the World Under-21 Championship in the 2022 SGP2 and won the 2022 World U-21 Team Championship.

In 2023, Miśkowiak won a fifth consecutive (and 6th in total) Team Speedway Junior European Championship for Poland. In 2024, he rode for Vargarna in Sweden.

== Family ==
Miśkowiak's uncle is former Polish international speedway rider Robert Miśkowiak.
