= Tom Brennan (speedway rider) =

British speedway rider (born 2001)

- Born: 2 July 2001 (age 25); Swindon, Wiltshire, England
- Nationality: British (English)

Career history

Great Britain
- 2017–2021: Eastbourne Eagles
- 2019: Cradley Heathens
- 2021–2023: Glasgow Tigers
- 2021–2023: Belle Vue Aces
- 2024: Birmingham Brummies
- 2024: Poole Pirates
- 2025-2026: Ipswich Witches

Poland
- 2021: Łódź
- 2022: Rawicz
- 2024: Gdańsk
- 2025: Bydgoszcz

Sweden
- 2024: Indianerna
- 2025: Västervik

Speedway Grand Prix statistics
- Starts: 1
- Finalist: 0 times
- Winner: 0 times

Individual honours
- 2021: British Under-21 Champion

Team honours
- 2021, 2024: World team champion
- 2023: Speedway World Cup silver
- 2022, 2025: British champions
- 2023, 2024: tier 2 league winner
- 2024: tier 2 KO Cup winner
- 2018: tier 3 league winner
- 2017, 2018: tier 3 KO Cup winner
- 2025: Swedish champions

Thomas Brennan (born 2 July 2001) is a British Motorcycle speedway rider.

== Career ==
In 2016, Brennan made a number of guest appearances at reserve for Eastbourne Eagles after he turned 15 and was eligible to ride in the National League. He made his debut for Eastbourne on his 15th birthday against Birmingham Brummies, however he crashed in his first ride and suffered a broken collarbone.

Brennan retained his spot for Eastbourne for the 2017 season. A good start to the season saw him move from reserve to number 1, before he moved to number 4 for the majority of the season. He scored his first paid maximum scoring 9+3 from four rides in the National League Knockout Cup Final against Mildenhall Fen Tigers. Brennan finished the season with an average of 7.21, making him the most improved rider in the National League in 2017, with an increase of 4.21 from his starting average of 3.00. He also helped Eastbourne win the Knockout Cup for the third successive season, beating Mildenhall in the final.

For the 2018 season, Brennan started in the number 3 position and scored his first full maximum and moved back to number 1 by the end of June. On 5 July, Brennan competed in the European U19 semi-final in Pardubice, scoring 11 points from his five rides finishing fifth and qualifying for the final. In the final at Varkaus, he finished ninth overall with a total of seven points. Brennan also made a guest appearance in the SGB Premiership. Brennan helped Eastbourne win the National League and cup double, winning the playoff and Knockout Cup, defeating Mildenhall in both.

Brennan continued with Eastbourne despite their move up to the SGB Championship 2019 and this allowed Brennan to sign for the Cradley Heathens in the lower division as well.

In 2021, Brennan became a world champion after the Great Britain national speedway team secured the 2021 Speedway of Nations (the world team title) and signed for the Belle Vue Aces. He returned to ride for Belle Vue in the SGB Premiership 2022, where he won the league title and for the Glasgow Tigers in the SGB Championship 2022. He finished runner-up to Dan Bewley in the 2022 British Speedway Championship and finished in ninth place during the World Under-21 Championship in the 2022 SGP2.

In 2023, Brennan re-signed for Belle Vue for the SGB Premiership 2023 and for Glasgow for the SGB Championship 2023, where he won the league title. Also in 2023, he was part of the British team that won the silver medal in the 2023 Speedway World Cup final.

At the end of the 2023 season, Brennan was released by both Belle Vue and Glasgow due to point limitations but was able to sign for two new teams in Birmingham Brummies and Poole Pirates for the 2024 season, winning the league title and knockout cup with the latter.

Brennan signed for Ipswich Witches and helped them win the SGB Premiership 2025 and in Sweden, he helped Västervik win the 2025 Elitserien.

== Major results ==
=== World individual Championship ===
- 2024 Speedway Grand Prix - =23rd
