= Norick Blödorn =

German motorcycle speedway rider

- Born: 1 June 2004 (age 22); Neumünster, Germany
- Nationality: German

Career history

Germany
- 2022: Brokstedt

Poland
- 2022-2023: Landshut
- 2024: Rybnik
- 2025: Poznań
- 2026: Toruń

Great Britain
- 2022–2025: Belle Vue

Denmark
- 2021: SES
- 2023, 2025: Region Varde

Sweden
- 2025: Vargarna

Speedway Grand Prix statistics
- Starts: 1
- Finalist: 0 times
- Winner: 0 times

Individual honours
- 2022: German champion

Team honours
- 2022, 2024: British league champion
- 2026: Polish champion

Norick Blödorn (born 1 June 2004) is a motorcycle speedway rider from Germany.

== Career ==
Blödorn competed in the top tier of British Speedway, riding for the Belle Vue Aces in the SGB Premiership 2022, where he won a league title.

In 2022, Blödorn became the youngest-ever German national champion and competed in the 2022 SGP2.

After a successful first season with Belle Vue, Blödorn re-signed with them for the SGB Premiership 2023. Also in 2023, he was part of the German team that competed in the 2023 Speedway World Cup in Poland.

Blödorn re-signed with Belle Vue for their 2024 title winning season and helped Germany reach the final of the 2024 Speedway of Nations at his home track in Manchester. He also competed in the final of the 2024 Speedway European Championship.

== Major results ==
=== World individual Championship ===
- 2024 Speedway Grand Prix – =27th

=== World team Championships ===
- 2024 Speedway of Nations – 4th
