= 2026 Swedish speedway season =

Season of motorcycle speedway in Sweden

The 2026 Swedish Speedway season is the 2026 season of motorcycle speedway in Sweden. The season includes the Swedish Individual Speedway Championship and the Swedish Speedway Team Championship.

Sponsored by the Bauhaus retail company, the Elitserien would field the same eight teams as the previous season. Västervik would defend the title and the season runs from 5 May until 22 September 2026.

The Allsvenskan consisted of the same six teams that participated in 2025.

== Individual ==
=== Swedish Individual Championship ===
The 2026 Swedish Individual Speedway Championship will take place during the season.

Pos.	Rider	Points	Total	Semi	Final
1					
2					
3					
4					
5					
6					
7					
8					
9					
10					
11					
12					
13					
14					
15					
16					
17					

== Team ==
=== Team Championship ===
==== Elitserien ====
Pos	Team	P	W	D	L	BP	Pts
1	Västervik						
2	Smederna						
3	Lejonen						
4	Rospiggarna						
5	Dackarna						
6	Indianerna						
7	Vargarna						
8	Piraterna						

Quarter-finals

Team 1	Team 2	Score
		–, –
		–, –
		–, –

Semi-finals

Team 1	Team 2	Score
		–, –
		–, –

Final

15 Sep

–

22 Sep

–

==== Allsvenskan (second tier league) ====
Pos	Team	P	W	D	L	BP	Pts
1	Masarna						
2	Örnarna						
3	Valsarna						
4	Njudungarna						
5	Solkatterna						
6	Griparna						

Semi-finals

Team 1	Team 2	Score
		–, –
		–, –

Final

Team 1	Team 2	Score
		–, –

== Squads ==
=== Elitserien ===
Dackarna

- (Denmark) William Drejer
- (Sweden) Thomas H. Jonasson
- (Poland) Jakub Krawczyk
- (Russia) Artem Laguta
- (Sweden) / (Finland) Timo Lahti
- (Denmark) Matias Nielsen
- (Ukraine) Nazar Parnitskyi
- (Sweden) Daniel Hauge Sjöström
- (Sweden) Avon Van Dyck
- (Sweden) Sammy Van Dyck
- (England) Tai Woffinden

Indianerna

- (Sweden) Alfred Åberg
- (United States) Luke Becker
- (France) Dimitri Bergé
- (Sweden) Oliver Berntzon
- (Poland) Krzysztof Buczkowski
- (Sweden) Jonatan Grahn
- (Germany) Kai Huckenbeck
- (Sweden) Rasmus Karlsson
- (Poland) Bartłomiej Kowalski
- (Poland) Przemysław Pawlicki
- (Poland) Szymon Woźniak

Lejonen

- (Sweden) Eddie Bock
- (Poland) Robert Chmiel
- (Poland) Mateusz Cierniak
- (Sweden) Casper Henriksson
- (Poland) Wiktor Jasiński
- (Poland) Dominik Kubera
- (Poland) Paweł Przedpełski
- (Sweden) Albin Sigvardsson
- (Sweden) Mathias Thörnblom
- (Sweden) Alfons Wiltander
- (Poland) Kacper Woryna
- (Poland) Bartosz Zmarzlik

Piraterna

- (Sweden) Jonathan Ejnermark
- (Poland) Kevin Fajfer
- (Poland) Oskar Fajfer
- (Latvia) Daniils Kolodinskis
- (Sweden) Harry Lundahl
- (Czech Republic) Václav Milík
- (Poland) Oskar Paluch
- (Sweden) Erik Persson
- (Poland) Damian Ratajczak
- (Poland) Bartosz Smektała

Rospiggarna

- (Czech Republic) Adam Bednar
- (France) David Bellego
- (United Kingdom) Adam Ellis
- (Sweden) Philip Hellström Bängs
- (Denmark) Jonas Knudsen
- (Denmark) Mikkel Michelsen
- (Sweden) Emil Millberg
- (Poland) Piotr Pawlicki Jr.
- (Russia) Vadim Tarasenko

Smederna

- (Denmark) Mikkel Andersen
- (Sweden) Joel Andersson
- (Russia) / (Poland) Gleb Chugunov
- (Sweden) Daniel Henderson
- (Poland) Jakub Jamróg
- (Sweden) Anton Jansson
- (Poland) Maciej Janowski
- (Sweden) Leo Klasson
- (Latvia) Andzejs Lebedevs
- (Sweden) Charlie Netz
- (Sweden) Kim Nilsson
- (Norway) Mathias Pollestad

Vargarna

- (Germany) Norick Blödorn
- (Sweden) Filip Hjelmland
- (Denmark) Frederik Jakobsen
- (Denmark) Kevin Juhl Pedersen
- (Australia) Jaimon Lidsey
- (Poland) Jakub Miśkowiak
- (Poland) Maksymilian Pawelczak
- (Poland) Wiktor Przyjemski
- (Slovakia) Martin Vaculík
- (Sweden) Christoffer Selvin
- (Sweden) Ludvig Selvin

Västervik

- (England) Tom Brennan
- (Sweden) Adam Carlsson
- (Australia) Jason Doyle
- (Denmark) Mads Hansen
- (Denmark) Rasmus Jensen
- (Sweden) Anton Karlsson
- (England) Robert Lambert
- (Denmark) Villads Nagel
- (Sweden) Jacob Thorssell
- (Sweden) Noel Wahlqvist

=== Allsvenskan ===
Griparna

- (Sweden) Eddie Bock
- (Denmark) Dimitri Buch
- (Sweden) Adam Carlsson
- (Sweden) William Fogelin
- (Sweden) Sebastian Glimfjall Johansson
- (Sweden) Anton Karlsson
- (Denmark) Patrick Kruse
- (Germany) Celina Liebmann
- (Sweden) Alexander Jacobsson Sundkvist
- (Denmark) Tobias Thomsen
- (Denmark) Rune Thorst
- (Sweden) Noel Wahlqvist

Masarna

- (Sweden) Alfred Åberg
- (Sweden) Joel Andersson
- (Denmark) Emil Breum
- (Sweden) Philip Hellström Bängs
- (Denmark) Niklas Holm Jakobsen
- (Sweden) Dante Johansson
- (Sweden) Aleks Lundquist
- (Sweden) Emil Millberg
- (Sweden) Charlie Netz
- (Sweden) Kim Nilsson
- (Denmark) Rasmus Pedersen
- (Sweden) Christoffer Selvin
- (Denmark) Michael Thyme

Njudungarna

- (Sweden) Linus Claesson
- (Denmark) Kenneth Hansen
- (Sweden) Filip Hjelmland
- (Denmark) Jacob Jensen
- (Sweden) Thomas H. Jonasson
- (Sweden) Milo Sjöö
- (Sweden) Daniel Hauge Sjöström
- (Sweden) Avon Van Dyck
- (Sweden) Sammy Van Dyck
- (Australia) Michael West
- (Sweden) Alfons Wiltander

Örnarna

- (Sweden) Henrik Bergström
- (Sweden) Rasmus Broberg
- (United States) Gino Manzares
- (Sweden) Ludvig Selvin
- (Sweden) Casper Henriksson
- (Sweden) Leo Klasson
- (Sweden) Ludvig Selvin

Solkatterna

- (Sweden) Casper Appelgren
- (Sweden) Rasmus Broberg
- (Latvia) Damir Filimonovs
- (Sweden) Jonatan Grahn
- (Norway) Truls Kamhaug
- (England) Drew Kemp
- (Sweden) / (Finland) Timo Lahti
- (Sweden) Harry Lundahl
- (Latvia) Oļegs Mihailovs
- (Sweden) Victor Palovaara
- (Denmark) Villads Pedersen
- (Sweden) Tyr Soderblom

Valsarna

- (Denmark) Nicklas Aagaard
- (Sweden) Sebastian Aldén
- (Sweden) Robin Aspegren
- (Poland) Kacper Łobodziński
- (Sweden) Jonathan Ejnermark
- (Denmark) Esben Hjerrild
- (Sweden) Theo Johansson
- (Finland) Jesse Mustonen
- (Sweden) Erik Persson
- (Poland) Sebastian Szostak
- (Sweden) Mathias Thörnblom
- (Finland) Antti Vuolas

== See also ==
- Speedway in Sweden
