= 2025 Swedish speedway season =

Season of motorcycle speedway in Sweden

The 2025 Swedish Speedway season is the 2025 season of motorcycle speedway in Sweden. The season includes the Swedish Individual Speedway Championship and the Swedish Speedway Team Championship.

Sponsored by the Bauhaus retail company, the Elitserien would field the same eight teams as the previous season. Lejonen would defend the title.

The Allsvenskan would consist of six teams because Gislaved (the Lejonen second) team would not participate.

Västervik won the Elitserien and Örnarna won the Allsvenskan.

== Individual ==
=== Swedish Individual Championship ===
The 2025 Swedish Individual Speedway Championship was initially due to take place at the Norrköping Motorstadion on 24 June but was cancelled due to bad weather. The event was rescheduled on 11 August and won for the fifth time by Fredrik Lindgren.

Pos.	Rider	Points	Total	Semi	Final
1	Fredrik Lindgren	3,2,2,3,2	12	-	3
2	Kim Nilsson	3,2,3,3,3	14	-	2
3	Jacob Thorssell	3,3,2,2,1	11	3	1
4	Timo Lahti	2,3,2,3,3	13	-	0
5	Oliver Berntzon	w,3,3,3,0	9	2	
6	Ludvig Lindgren	1,2,3,2,2	10	1	
7	Casper Henriksson	2,3,1,0,3	9	0	
8	Thomas H. Jonasson	u,1,1,2,3	7		
9	Philip Hellström Bängs	2,2,0,2,1	7		
10	Noel Wahlqvist	3,1,w,0,2	6		
11	Rasmus Karlsson	1,1,3,1,0	6		
12	Joel Andersson	1,0,2,1,2	6		
13	Daniel Henderson	2,1,0,0,1	4		
14	Avon Van Dyck	1,0,1,1,1	4		
15	Emil Millberg	0,0,0,1,0	1		
16	Christoffer Selvin	0,0,-,-,-	0		
17	Leo Klasson	u,0,0	0		

=== U21 Championship ===
Rasmus Karlsson won the U21 title at Kalvholmen Motorstadion in Karlstad on 13 August.

== Team ==
=== Team Championship ===
==== Elitserien ====
Pos	Team	P	W	D	L	BP	Pts
1	Västervik	14	11	0	3	6	28
2	Smederna	14	11	0	3	4	26
3	Lejonen	14	9	0	5	5	23
4	Rospiggarna	14	8	0	6	4	20
5	Dackarna	14	6	0	8	4	16
6	Indianerna	14	4	1	9	3	13
7	Vargarna	14	3	2	9	1	9
8	Piraterna	14	2	1	11	0	5

Quarter-finals

Team 1	Team 2	Score
Indianerna	Smederna	44–46, 38–52
Rospiggarna	Lejonen	41–49, 39–51
Dackarna	Västervik	44–46, 36–54

Semi-finals

Team 1	Team 2	Score
Smederna	Lejonen	50–40, 43–35
Indianerna	Västervik	31–59, 25–65

Final

16 Sep	Smederna; Michael Jepsen Jensen 10; Gleb Chugunov 9 Maksym Drabik 6 Leon Madsen 5 Mathias Pollestad 3 Kim Nilsson 3 Leo Klasson 1	37–41	Västervik; Tom Brennan 11; Fredrik Lindgren 9 Robert Lambert 7 Mads Hansen 5 Jacob Thorssell 4 Matias Nielsen 3 Anton Karlsson 2	Smedstadion

23 Sep	Västervik; Robert Lambert 10; Bartosz Smektala 10; Mads Hansen 9 Fredrik Lindgren 8 Jacob Thorssell 6 Anton Karlsson 1 Tom Brennan 0	44–46	Smederna; Gleb Chugunov 12; Leon Madsen 11; Michael Jepsen Jensen 9 Mathias Pollestad 7 Kim Nilsson 5 Maksym Drabik 2 Leo Klasson 0	Hejla Arena

==== Allsvenskan (second tier league) ====
Pos	Team	P	W	D	L	BP	Pts
1	Masarna	10	7	0	3	4	18
2	Örnarna	10	5	2	3	4	16
3	Valsarna	10	6	1	3	3	16
4	Njudungarna	10	5	1	4	2	13
5	Solkatterna	10	4	2	4	2	12
6	Griparna	10	0	0	10	0	0

Semi-finals

Team 1	Team 2	Score
Örnarna	Valsarna	57–39, 48–48
Masarna	Njudungarna	47–48, 42–54

Final

18 September

Njudungarna; Jacob Jensen 10; Filip Hjelmland 9 Anton Karlsson 9 Avon Van Dyck 8 Alfons Wiltander 7 Tomas Henaes Jonasson 4 Daniel Hauge Sjöström 3	50–46	Örnarna; Oliver Berntzon 18; Daniel Henderson 8 Casper Henriksson 7 Ludvig Selvin 7 Leo Klasson 6 Glenn Moi 0 Gino Manzares 0	Vetlanda Motorstadion

Örnarna; Oliver Berntzon 14; Gino Manzares 11; Casper Henriksson 9 Ludvig Selvin 7 Leo Klasson 7 Glenn Moi 6 Daniel Henderson 6	60–33	Njudungarna; Avon Van Dyck 10; Filip Hjelmland 8 Alfons Wiltander 4 Tomas Henaes Jonasson 4 Jacob Jensen 3 Daniel Hauge Sjöström 2 Anton Karlsson 2	Gruskungen Speedway Arena

== Squads ==
=== Elitserien ===
Dackarna

- (Denmark) Patrick Hansen
- (Denmark) Frederik Jakobsen
- (Denmark) Rasmus Jensen
- (Sweden) Thomas H. Jonasson
- (Poland) Jakub Krawczyk
- (Latvia) Andzejs Lebedevs
- (Sweden) / (Finland) Timo Lahti
- (Ukraine) Nazar Parnitskyi
- (Denmark) Nicki Pedersen
- (Poland) Paweł Przedpełski
- (Sweden) Avon Van Dyck

Indianerna

- (Poland) Bartosz Banbor
- (United States) Luke Becker
- (France) Dimitri Bergé
- (Poland) Krzysztof Buczkowski
- (Poland) Patryk Dudek
- (Sweden) Jonatan Grahn
- (Latvia) Francis Gusts
- (Sweden) Rasmus Karlsson
- (Poland) Bartłomiej Kowalski
- (Sweden) Emil Millberg
- (Poland) Sebastian Szostak
- (Poland) Szymon Woźniak

Lejonen

- (Sweden) Oliver Berntzon
- (Poland) Robert Chmiel
- (Poland) Mateusz Cierniak
- (Poland) Jarosław Hampel
- (Sweden) Casper Henriksson
- (Poland) Dominik Kubera
- (Sweden) Erik Persson
- (Sweden) Sammy Van Dyck
- (Sweden) Alfons Wiltander
- (Poland) Kacper Woryna
- (Poland) Bartosz Zmarzlik

Piraterna

- (Sweden) Jonathan Ejnermark
- (Poland) Oskar Fajfer
- (Latvia) Daniils Kolodinskis
- (Denmark) Andreas Lyager
- (Czech Republic) Václav Milík
- (Poland) Przemysław Pawlicki
- (Sweden) Ludvig Selvin
- (Denmark) Tim Sørensen
- (Sweden) Mathias Thörnblom
- (Australia) Rohan Tungate

Rospiggarna

- (Sweden) Kasperi Ahvenainen
- (Sweden) Eddie Bock
- (Australia) Ryan Douglas
- (United Kingdom) Adam Ellis
- (Germany) Kai Huckenbeck
- (Sweden) Anton Jansson
- (Russia) Artem Laguta
- (Sweden) Ludvig Lindgren
- (Denmark) Villads Nagel
- (Poland) Wiktor Przyjemski
- (Russia) Vadim Tarasenko

Smederna

- (Sweden) Joel Andersson
- (Poland) Maksym Drabik
- (Sweden) Philip Hellström Bängs
- (Russia) / (Poland) Gleb Chugunov
- (Poland) Jakub Jamróg
- (Denmark) Leon Madsen
- (Denmark) Michael Jepsen Jensen
- (Sweden) Kim Nilsson
- (Norway) Mathias Pollestad

Vargarna

- (Germany) Norick Blödorn
- (Sweden) Daniel Henderson
- (Sweden) Filip Hjelmland
- (Denmark) Niels Kristian Iversen
- (Australia) Jaimon Lidsey
- (Poland) Jakub Miśkowiak
- (Poland) Marcin Nowak
- (Sweden) Victor Palovaara
- (Denmark) Kevin Juhl Pedersen
- (Poland) Oskar Polis
- (Sweden) Christoffer Selvin

Västervik

- (England) Tom Brennan
- (Denmark) Mads Hansen
- (Sweden) Anton Karlsson
- (England) Robert Lambert
- (Sweden) Freddie Lindgren
- (Denmark) Matias Nielsen
- (Poland) Bartosz Smektała
- (Sweden) Jacob Thorssell
- (Sweden) Noel Wahlqvist
- (Poland) Patryk Wojdyło

=== Allsvenskan ===
Griparna

- (Sweden) Emil Albrechtsen
- (Italy) Matteo Boncinelli
- (Denmark) Dimitri Buch
- (Sweden) Elliot Carlmar
- (Norway) Lasse Fredriksen
- (Poland) Adrian Gała
- (Germany) Ben Iken
- (Sweden) Benny Johansson
- (Sweden) Sebastian Glimfjall Johansson
- (Denmark) Patrick Kruse
- (Netherlands) Mika Meijer
- (Sweden) Alexander Jacobsson Sundkvist
- (Denmark) Rune Thorst

Masarna

- (Finland) Tero Aarnio
- (Sweden) Alfred Åberg
- (Sweden) Joel Andersson
- (Sweden) Eddie Bock
- (England) Will Cairns
- (Poland) Kacper Grzelak
- (Sweden) Philip Hellström Bängs
- (Sweden) Dante Johansson
- (Poland) Antoni Kawczyński
- (Sweden) Alexander Liljekvist
- (Sweden) Aleks Lundquist
- (Sweden) Emil Millberg
- (Sweden) Charlie Netz
- (Sweden) Kim Nilsson
- (Denmark) Rasmus Pedersen
- (Sweden) Alfons Wiltander

Njudungarna

- (Sweden) Mikael Axelsson
- (Sweden) Theo Bergqvist
- (Sweden) Linus Claesson
- (Sweden) Oscar Evertsson
- (Sweden) Sebastian Glimfjäll Johansson
- (Sweden) Filip Hjelmland
- (Denmark) Jacob Jensen
- (Denmark) Sam Jensen
- (Sweden) Thomas H. Jonasson
- (Sweden) Anton Karlsson
- (Denmark) Hjalte Nygaard
- (Sweden) Daniel Hauge Sjöström
- (Sweden) Mathias Thörnblom
- (Sweden) Avon Van Dyck
- (Sweden) Sammy Van Dyck

Örnarna

- (Poland) Mateusz Bartkowiak
- (Sweden) Oliver Berntzon
- (Sweden) Adam Carlsson
- (Sweden) Henric Fernström
- (Sweden) Jonatan Grahn
- (Sweden) Casper Henriksson
- (Sweden) Anton Jansson
- (Sweden) Leo Klasson
- (United States) Gino Manzares
- (Poland) Artur Mroczka
- (Sweden) Ludvig Selvin

Solkatterna

- (Australia) Fraser Bowes
- (Latvia) Damir Filimonovs
- (Norway) Truls Kamhaug
- (England) Drew Kemp
- (Sweden) Harry Lundahl
- (Sweden) Rasmus Karlsson
- (Latvia) Oļegs Mihailovs
- (Sweden) Victor Palovaara
- (Sweden) Christoffer Selvin
- (Sweden) Milo Sjöö
- (Denmark) Michael Thyme

Valsarna

- (Denmark) Nicklas Aagaard
- (Denmark) Bastian Borke
- (Sweden) Jonathan Ejnermark
- (Sweden) Jonny Eriksson
- (Denmark) Kenneth Hansen
- (Sweden) Isak Lundquist
- (Norway) Glenn Moi
- (Finland) Jesse Mustonen
- (Sweden) Erik Persson

== See also ==
- Speedway in Sweden
