= 2024 Swedish speedway season =

Season of motorcycle speedway in Sweden

The 2024 Swedish Speedway season is the 2024 season of motorcycle speedway in Sweden. The season includes the Swedish Individual Speedway Championship and the Swedish Speedway Team Championship.

In October 2023, Vargarna announced their intention to return to the Bauhaus retail company sponsored Elitserien. The Allsvenskan would retain seven teams with the addition of Masarna, who won the third tier division 1 in 2023.

Lejonen won the Elitserien to become champions of Sweden, while Solkatterna won the Allsvenskan going unbeaten during the season.

== Individual ==
=== Swedish Individual Championship ===
The 2024 Swedish Individual Speedway Championship took place on 28 May at the Hejla Arena and was won by Fredrik Lindgren. It was the fourth time Lindgren had been crowned Swedish champion, moving him up to fifth place on the all-time list. Kim Nilsson finished second and earned a wildcard for the 2024 Speedway Grand Prix of Sweden on 15 June.

Pos.	Rider	Team	Points	Total	Semi	Final
1	Fredrik Lindgren	Vikingarna	(3,3,3,3,2)	14		3
2	Kim Nilsson	Smederna	(3,3,2,3,3)	14		2
3	Filip Hjelmland	Dackarna	(3,2,3,2,2)	12		1
4	Philip Hellström Bängs	Smederna	(3,0,1,3,3)	10	3	W
5	Timo Lahti ( (Finland) )	Dackarna	(0,2,3,1,3)	9	2	
6	Jonatan Grahn	Indianerna	(1,3,3,0,1)	8	1	
7	Antonio Lindbäck	Rospiggarna	(1,2,2,2,2)	9	0	
8	Jacob Thorssell	Västervik	(3,2,2,0,1)	8		
9	Oliver Berntzon	Lejonen	(2,3,0,2,0)	7		
10	Casper Henriksson	Lejonen	(1,1,0,3,2)	8		
11	Mathias Thörnblom	Lejonen	(0,1,1,2,2)	6		
12	Noel Wahlqvist	Dackarna	(1,0,2,1,1)	5		
13	Victor Palovaara	Rospiggarna	(2,1,1,0,1)	5		
14	Thomas H. Jonasson	Griparna	(2,1,1,1,U)	5		
15	Sammy Van Dyck	Lejonen	(0,0,0,1,0)	1		
16	Ludvig Lindgren	Vargarna	(0,0,0,0,0)	0		

=== U21 Championship ===
Philip Hellström Bängs won the U21 title at Gislaved Motorbana in Gislaved on 7 August.

== Team ==
=== Team Championship ===
==== Elitserien ====
Lejonen won the Elitserien to become champions of Sweden for the third time.

Pos	Team	P	W	D	L	BP	F	A	Pts
1	Lejonen	14	12	1	1	6	750	507	31
2	Västervik	14	12	1	1	6	730	529	31
3	Indianerna	14	7	0	7	4	630	629	18
4	Dackarna	14	6	1	7	4	647	614	17
5	Smederna	14	7	0	7	3	638	621	17
6	Piraterna	14	5	0	9	3	600	657	13
7	Rospiggarna	14	3	0	11	1	536	720	7
8	Vargarna	14	2	1	11	1	504	755	6

Quarter-finals

Team 1	Team 2	Score
Piraterna	Indianerna	47–43, 34–56
Smederna	Dackarna	49–41, 31–59

Semi-finals

Team 1	Team 2	Score
Lejonen	Indianerna	53–37, 51–39
Västervik	Dackarna	38–52, 47–43

Final

17 September	Dackarna; Dan Bewley 11; Brady Kurtz 9 Rasmus Jensen 7 Andzejs Lebedevs 7 Tomas H. Jonasson 4 Timo Lahti 3 David Bellego 2	43–47	Lejonen; Bartosz Zmarzlik 14; Oliver Berntzon 9 Dominik Kubera 9 Kacper Woryna 9 Casper Henriksson 5 Mateusz Cierniak 1 Sammy Van Dyck 0	Skrotfrag Arena

1 October	Lejonen; Dominik Kubera 11; Mateusz Cierniak 11; Bartosz Zmarzlik 9 Oliver Berntzon 6 Kacper Woryna 6 Casper Henriksson 4 Sammy Van Dyck 2	49–41	Dackarna; Andzejs Lebedevs 11; Dan Bewley 7 Brady Kurtz 9 Rasmus Jensen 6 Tomas H. Jonasson 5 Ryan Douglas 5 Timo Lahti 0	Gislaved Motorbana

==== Allsvenskan (second tier league) ====
Pos	Team	P	W	D	L	BP	F	A	Pts
1	Solkatterna	12	12	0	0	6	636	423	30
2	Griparna	12	7	0	5	4	513	498	18
3	Njudungarna	12	5	1	6	4	575	491	15
4	Örnarna	12	5	2	5	3	492	539	15
5	Valsarna	12	5	1	6	2	447	530	13
6	Masarna	12	4	0	8	1	476	558	9
7	Gislaved	12	2	0	10	1	454	554	5

Semi-finals

Team 1	Team 2	Score
Solkatterna	Örnarna	52–38, 46–44
Griparna	Njudungarna	50–40, 48–42

Final

19 September

Griparna; Kim Nilsson 13; Jonas Knudsen 9 Tomas Jonasson; Noel Wahlqvist 6 Kenneth Kruse Hansen 8 Jonny Eriksson 1	44–46	Solkatterna; Victor Palovaara 11; Joel Andersson 11; Jonathan Grahn 10; Fraser Bowes 9 Rasmus Karlsson 4 Ricards Ansviesulis 1 Drew Kemp R/R	TMA Bolaget Arena

September

Solkatterna; Victor Palovaara 10; Fraser Bowes 10; Jonathan Grahn 9 Rasmus Karlsson 8 Joel Andersson 7 Ricards Ansviesulis 2 Drew Kemp R/R	46–44	Griparna; Kim Nilsson 15; Jonas Knudsen 10; Noel Wahlqvist 8 Kenneth Kruse Hansen 6 Tomas Jonasson 4 Jonny Eriksson 1	Specialrengöringar Arena

==== Division One (third tier league) ====
Pos	Team	P	Pts				
1	Rospiggarna/Masarna	12	4	3	5	0	23
2	Vikingarna	12	4	4	2	2	22
3	Smederna/Indianerna	11	2	3	3	3	13
4	Smålänningarna	12	2	2	2	6	12

== Squads ==
=== Elitserien ===
Dackarna

- (France) David Bellego
- (England) Dan Bewley
- (Australia) Ryan Douglas
- (Sweden) Filip Hjelmland
- (Denmark) Rasmus Jensen
- (Sweden) Thomas H. Jonasson
- (Australia) Brady Kurtz
- (Latvia) Andzejs Lebedevs
- (Sweden) / (Finland) Timo Lahti
- (Sweden) Avon Van Dyck
- (Sweden) Noel Wahlqvist

Indianerna

- (Sweden) Eddie Bock
- (England) Tom Brennan
- (Poland) Krzysztof Buczkowski
- (Poland) Gleb Chugunov
- (Poland) Patryk Dudek
- (Sweden) Jonatan Grahn
- (Sweden) Rasmus Karlsson
- (Poland) Bartłomiej Kowalski
- (Norway) Mathias Pollestad
- (Sweden) Johannes Stark
- (Denmark) Anders Thomsen
- (Poland) Szymon Woźniak

Lejonen

- (Sweden) Oliver Berntzon
- (Poland) Mateusz Cierniak
- (Poland) Jarosław Hampel
- (Sweden) Casper Henriksson
- (Poland) Dominik Kubera
- (Australia) Jaimon Lidsey
- (Sweden) Mathias Thörnblom
- (Sweden) Sammy Van Dyck
- (Sweden) Alfons Wiltander
- (Poland) Kacper Woryna
- (Poland) Bartosz Zmarzlik

Piraterna

- (Sweden) Jonathan Ejnermark
- (Poland) Oskar Fajfer
- (Poland) Maciej Janowski
- (Poland) Norbert Krakowiak
- (Poland) Jakub Krawczyk
- (Czech Republic) Václav Milík
- (Poland) Piotr Pawlicki
- (Poland) Przemysław Pawlicki
- (Sweden) Erik Persson
- (Poland) Paweł Przedpełski
- (Sweden) Ludvig Selvin
- (Sweden) Mathias Thörnblom

Rospiggarna

- (France) Dimitri Bergé
- (Sweden) Jonny Eriksson
- (Germany) Kai Huckenbeck
- (Poland) Jakub Jamróg
- (Sweden) Dante Johansson
- (Russia) Artem Laguta
- (Sweden) Antonio Lindbäck
- (Sweden) Victor Palovaara
- (Poland) Kacper Pludra
- (Poland) Oskar Polis
- (Poland) Wiktor Przyjemski
- (Poland) Sebastian Szostak
- (Poland) Mateusz Szczepaniak

Smederna

- (Sweden) Joel Andersson
- (Poland) Maksym Drabik
- (Sweden) Philip Hellström Bängs
- (Denmark) Frederik Jakobsen
- (Sweden) Anton Jansson
- (Denmark) Michael Jepsen Jensen
- (Sweden) Kim Nilsson
- (Russia) Vadim Tarasenko
- (Australia) Rohan Tungate
- (Poland) Patryk Wojdyło
- (Poland) Grzegorz Zengota

Västervik

- (United States) Luke Becker
- (Sweden) Theo Bergqvist
- (Australia) Max Fricke
- (Denmark) Mads Hansen
- (Sweden) Anton Karlsson
- (England) Robert Lambert
- (Sweden) Alexander Liljekvist
- (Sweden) Peter Ljung
- (Sweden) Emil Millberg
- (Denmark) Matias Nielsen
- (Poland) Bartosz Smektała
- (Sweden) Jacob Thorssell
- (England) Tai Woffinden

Vargarna

- (Sweden) Willy Andersson
- (Poland) Adrian Cyfer
- (Latvia) Francis Gusts
- (England) Chris Harris
- (Sweden) Daniel Henderson
- (Sweden) Oscar Holstensson
- (Denmark) Niels Kristian Iversen
- (Denmark) Jonas Jeppesen
- (Poland) Hubert Łęgowik
- (Sweden) Ludvig Lindgren
- (Poland) Jakub Miśkowiak
- (Poland) Marcin Nowak
- (Denmark) Kevin Juhl Pedersen
- (Sweden) Christoffer Selvin
- (Poland) Mateusz Tonder

=== Allsvenskan ===
Gislaved

- (Poland) Robert Chmiel
- (Poland) Mateusz Dul
- (Sweden) Casper Henriksson
- (Sweden) Alexander Jacobsson Sundkvist
- (Poland) Wiktor Jasiński
- (Poland) Oskar Paluch
- (Sweden) Erik Persson
- (Denmark) Emil Pørtner
- (Poland) Damian Ratajczak
- (Sweden) Albin Sigvardsson
- (Sweden) Mathias Thörnblom
- (Sweden) Alfons Witlander
- (Sweden) Felix Woentin

Griparna

- (Sweden) Liam Olsson Andersson
- (Sweden) Willy Andersson
- (Denmark) Kenneth Hansen
- (Sweden) Oscar Holstensson
- (Sweden) Anton Jansson
- (Sweden) Thomas H. Jonasson
- (Denmark) Patrick Kruse
- (Finland) Roni Niemelä
- (Sweden) Kim Nilsson
- (Sweden) Johannes Stark
- (Denmark) Tobias Thomsen
- (Sweden) Noel Wahlqvist

Masarna

- (Sweden) Alfred Åberg
- (Sweden) Eddie Bock
- (Poland) Adrian Gała
- (Sweden) Philip Hellström Bängs
- (Sweden) Timo Lahti
- (Sweden) Alexander Liljekvist
- (Sweden) Aleks Lundquist
- (Sweden) Isak Lundquist
- (Sweden) Emil Millberg
- (England) Jack Smith
- (Denmark) Tim Sørensen
- (Denmark) Michael Thyme

Njudungarna

- (Sweden) Mikael Axelsson
- (Sweden) Theo Bergqvist
- (Denmark) Emil Breum
- (Sweden) Sebastian Glimfjäll Johansson
- (Sweden) Filip Hjelmland
- (Denmark) Sam Jensen
- (Sweden) Anton Karlsson
- (Sweden) Peter Ljung
- (Netherlands) Mika Meijer
- (Denmark) Villads Nagel
- (Sweden) Avon Van Dyck
- (Sweden) Sammy Van Dyck

Örnarna

- (Denmark) Patrick Bæk
- (Poland) Mateusz Bartkowiak
- (Sweden) Oliver Berntzon
- (Sweden) Jonny Eriksson
- (Sweden) Henric Fernström
- (Sweden) Daniel Henderson
- (Sweden) Ludvig Lindgren
- (United States) Gino Manzares
- (Sweden) Christoffer Selvin
- (Sweden) Ludvig Selvin
- (Netherlands) Lars Zadvliet

Solkatterna

- (Finland) Tero Aarnio
- (Sweden) Joel Andersson
- (Latvia) Ričards Ansviesulis
- (Australia) Fraser Bowes
- (Latvia) Damir Filimonovs
- (Sweden) Jonatan Grahn
- (Norway) Truls Kamhaug
- (Sweden) Rasmus Karlsson
- (Sweden) Victor Palovaara

Valsarna

- (Germany) Erik Bachhuber
- (Denmark) Bastian Borke
- (Australia) Mitchell Cluff
- (Sweden) Jonathan Ejnermark
- (Norway) Lasse Fredriksen
- (Sweden) Dante Johansson
- (Sweden) Antonio Lindbäck
- (Norway) Glenn Moi
- (Finland) Jesse Mustonen
- (Finland) Otto Raak

=== Division 1 ===
Smålänningarna

- (Sweden) Henric Fernström
- (Sweden) Alfons Wiltander
- (Sweden) Avon Van Dyck
- (Sweden) Sammy Van Dyck
- (Sweden) Theo Bergkvist
- (Sweden) Albin Sigvardsson
- (Sweden) Felix Woentin

Smederna/Indianerna

- (Sweden) Göran Flood
- (Sweden) Adrian Bergqvist
- (Sweden) Joel Andersson
- (Sweden) Viktor Flood
- (Sweden) Kim Nilsson
- (Sweden) Johannes Stark
- (Sweden) Jonatan Grahn
- (Sweden) Liam Olsson Andersson
- (Sweden) Anton Jansson
- (Sweden) Eddie Bock
- (Sweden) Philip Hellström Bängs
- (Sweden) Rasmus Karlsson
- (Sweden) Ludvig Hamrin
- (Sweden) Hampus Hamrin
- (Sweden) William Fogelin

Rospiggarna/Masarna

- (Sweden) Kasperi Ahvenainen
- (Sweden) Dante Johansson
- (Sweden) Isak Lundquist
- (Sweden) Aleks Lundquist
- (Sweden) Alfred Åberg
- (Sweden) Jonny Eriksson

Vikingarna

- (Sweden) Benny Johansson
- (Sweden) Freddie Lindgren
- (Sweden) Ludvig Lindgren
- (Romania) Adrian Gheorge
- (Romania) Marian Gheorghe
- (Sweden) Erik Persson
- (Sweden) Sebastian Glimfjäll Johansson
- (Sweden) Willy Andersson

== See also ==
- Speedway in Sweden
