= 2023 Swedish speedway season =

Season of motorcycle speedway in Sweden

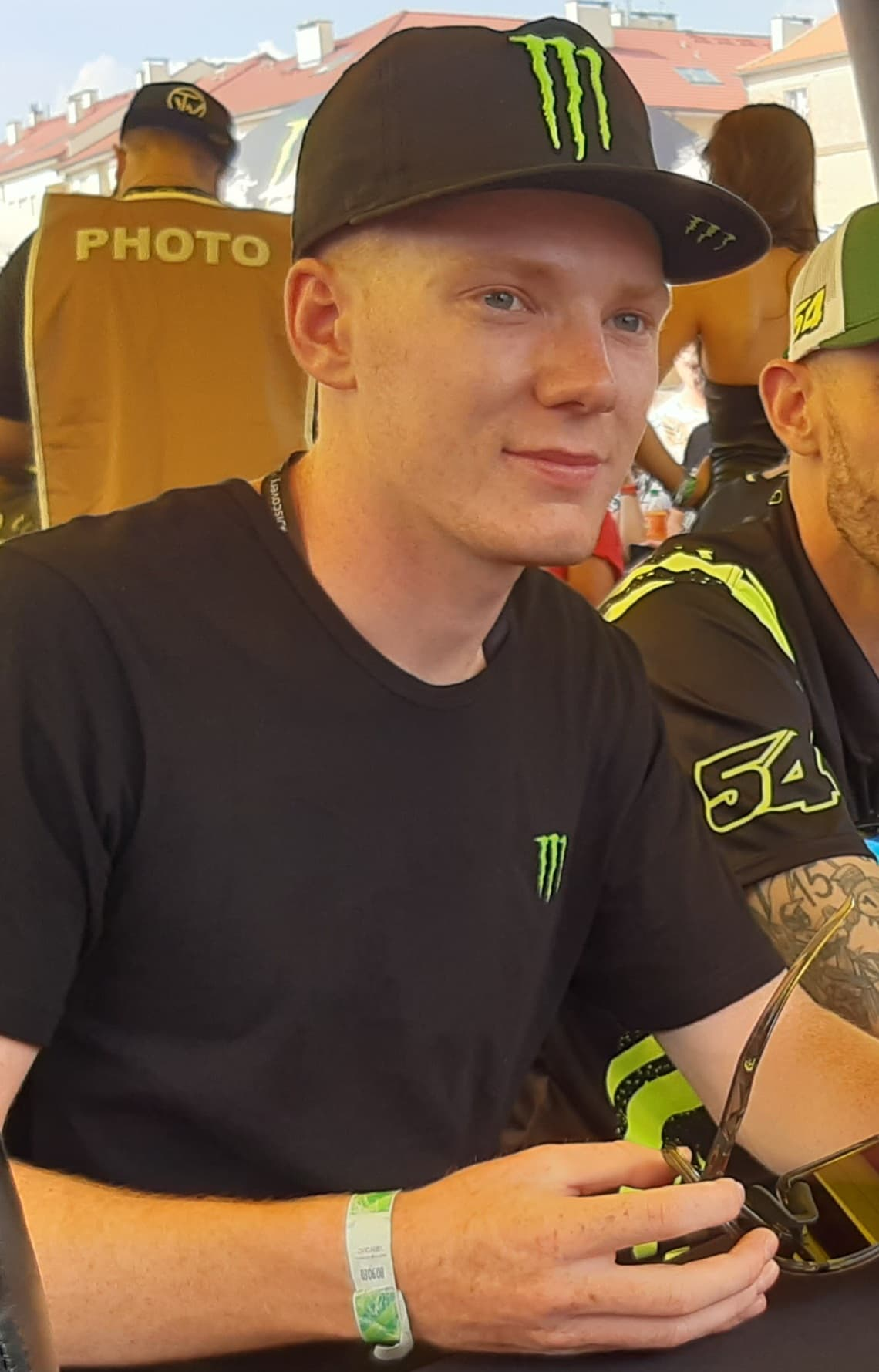
- Dan Bewley helped Dackarna win the Elitserien

The 2023 Swedish Speedway season is the 2023 season of motorcycle speedway in Sweden.

In February 2023, Masarna pulled out of the 2023 Elitserien due to financial difficulties. They were the second club in two successive years to have pulled out of the league.

== Individual ==
=== Individual Championship ===
The 2023 Swedish Individual Speedway Championship was the 2023 version of the Swedish Individual Speedway Championship. The title was won by Freddie Lindgren.

The final was held at the Skrotfrag Arena in Målilla on 27 June 2023.

Pos.	Rider	Team	Points	Total	Semi	Final
1	Freddie Lindgren	Västervik	(3,3,3,3,2)	14		3
2	Jacob Thorssell	Västervik	(3,3,2,3,3)	14		2
3	Timo Lahti ( (Finland) )	Rospiggarna	(3,2,1,3,2)	11	3	1
4	Oliver Berntzon	Lejonen	(2,2,3,1,3)	11		0
5	Kim Nilsson	Rospiggarna	(1,0,2,3,3)	9	2	
6	Daniel Henderson	Lejonen	(3,1,3,2,2)	11	1	
7	Casper Henriksson	Lejonen	(1,2,1,2,2)	8	0	
8	Antonio Lindbäck	Rospiggarna	(0,3,D,3,1)	7		
9	Filip Hjelmland	Dackarna	(2,0,3,0,1)	6		
10	Jonathan Ejnermark	Piraterna	(1,3,1,0,1)	6		
11	Joel Andersson	Smederna	(2,1,2,1,0)	6		
12	Ludvig Lindgren	Dackarna	(2,1,1,1,1)	6		
13	Victor Palovaara	Rospiggarna	(1,2,0,2,0)	5		
14	Anton Karlsson	Västervik	(0,1,0,0,2)	3		
15	Jonatan Grahn	Indianerna	(0,0,2,0,0)	2		
16	Ludvig Selvin	Piraterna	(0,W,0,1,0)	1		

== Team ==
=== Team Championship ===
==== Elitserien ====
Pos	Team	P	W	D	L	BP	Pts
1	Västervik	12	9	0	3	5	23
2	Dackarna	12	7	0	5	5	19
3	Piraterna	12	6	0	6	2	14
4	Indianerna	12	5	0	7	3	13
5	Lejonen	12	5	0	7	3	13
6	Rospiggarna	12	5	0	7	2	12
7	Smederna	12	5	0	7	1	11

Quarter-finals

Team 1	Team 2	Score
Rospiggarna	Piraterna	50–40, 44–46
Indianerna	Lejonen	43–47, 38–52

Semi-finals

Team 1	Team 2	Score
Västervik	Rospiggarna	53–37, 46–44
Lejonen	Dackarna	41–49, 39–51

Final

Team 1	Team 2	Score
Västervik	Dackarna	43–47, 44–46

==== Allsvenskan (second tier league) ====
Pos	Team	P	W	D	L	BP	Pts
1	Vargarna	12	9	1	2	6	25
2	Njudungarna	12	8	0	4	4	20
3	Valsarna	12	8	0	4	4	20
4	Gislaved	12	7	1	4	4	19
5	Örnarna	12	3	0	9	2	8
6	Griparna	12	3	0	9	1	7
7	Solkatterna	12	3	0	9	0	6

Semi-finals

Team 1	Team 2	Score
Valsarna	Vargarna	35–55, 45–45
Gislaved	Njudungarna	40–50, 42–48

Final

Team 1	Team 2	Score
Njudungarna	Vargarna	49–41, 44–46

==== Division One (third tier league) ====
Pos	Team	P	Pts
1	Masarna	12	24
2	Indianerna C	12	21
3	Team Dalej	12	20
4	Vikingarna	12	14
5	Smederna B	12	11

== Teams ==
=== Elitserien ===
Dackarna

- Dan Bewley
- Max Dilger
- Adrian Gala
- Filip Hjelmland
- Maciej Janowski
- Rasmus Jensen
- Brady Kurtz
- Andžejs Ļebedevs
- Ludvig Lindgren
- Avon Van Dyck
- Sammy Van Dyck
- Noel Wahlqvist

Indianerna

- Tero Aarnio
- Krzysztof Buczkowski
- Jason Doyle
- Max Fricke
- Gustav Grahn
- Jonatan Grahn
- Bartłomiej Kowalski
- Norbert Krakowiak
- Johannes Stark
- Rohan Tungate
- Szymon Woźniak

Lejonen

- Oliver Berntzon
- Mateusz Cierniak
- Francis Gusts
- Jarosław Hampel
- Daniel Henderson
- Casper Henriksson
- Dominik Kubera
- Jan Kvěch
- Jakub Miśkowiak
- Matias Nielsen
- Bartosz Zmarzlik

Piraterna

- Jonathan Ejnermark
- Oskar Fajfer
- Peter Ljung
- Václav Milík
- Piotr Pawlicki
- Przemysław Pawlicki
- Erik Persson
- Oskar Polis
- Paweł Przedpełski
- Jonas Seifert-Salk
- Christoffer Selvin
- Ludvig Selvin
- Mathias Thörnblom

Rospiggarna

- Luke Becker
- Dimitri Bergé
- Eddie Bock
- Kai Huckenbeck
- Niels Kristian Iversen
- Timo Lahti (left in July)
- Antonio Lindbäck
- Kim Nilsson
- Victor Palovaara
- Wiktor Przyjemski
- Grzegorz Zengota

Smederna

- Joel Andersson
- Maksym Drabik
- Philip Hellström Bängs
- Jonas Jeppesen
- Michael Jepsen Jensen
- Timo Lahti
- Jaimon Lidsey
- Robert Lambert
- Emil Millberg
- Mateusz Świdnicki
- Patryk Wojdylo
- Kacper Woryna

Västervik

- David Bellego
- Gleb Chugunov
- Mads Hansen
- Anton Karlsson
- Alexander Liljekvist
- Freddie Lindgren
- Mikkel Michelsen
- Bartosz Smektała
- Jacob Thorssell
- Tai Woffinden

=== Allsvenskan ===
Gislaved

- Theo Bergqvist
- Oliver Berntzon
- Robert Chmiel
- Oskar Paluch
- Kacper Pludra
- Emil Pørtner
- Alfons Witlander

Griparna

- Kenneth Hansen
- Alexander Liljekvist
- Ludvig Selvin
- Johannes Stark
- Tobias Thomsen

Njudungarna

- Filip Hjelmland
- Emil Breum
- Sammy Van Dyck
- Mathias Pollestad
- Avon Van Dyck
- Gino Manzares
- Mika Meijer

Örnarna

- Joel Andersson
- Henrik Fernstrom
- Matic Ivačič
- Ludvig Lindgren
- Emil Millberg
- Mateusz Świdnicki

Solkatterna

- Eddie Bock
- Fraser Bowes
- Ben Ernst
- Gustav Grahn
- Jonatan Grahn
- Hugo Lundahl
- Victor Palovaara

Valsarna

- Erik Bachhuber
- Jonathan Ejnermark
- Steven Goret
- Antonio Lindbäck
- Glenn Moi
- Jesse Mustonen

Vargarna

- Ričards Ansviesulis
- William Drejer
- Daniel Henderson
- Oscar Holstensson
- Benny Johansson
- Kevin Juhl Pedersen
- Mateusz Tonder

== See also ==
- Speedway in Sweden
