= 2024 Polish speedway season =

2024 season of motorcycle speedway in Poland

The 2024 Polish Speedway season is the 2024 season of motorcycle speedway in Poland. The season will run from early April to late September.

The 1.Liga will now be called the Ekstraliga 2.

== Individual ==
=== Polish Individual Speedway Championship ===
The 2024 Polish Individual Speedway Championship (Polish: Indywidualne Mistrzostwa Polski, IMP) was the 2024 version of Polish Individual Speedway Championship organised by the Polish Motor Union (PZM). It was staged over three rounds at Łódź, Bydgoszcz and Lublin and was won by Maciej Janowski, who became Polish champion for the third time in his career.

Pos.	Rider	Club	Total
1	Maciej Janowski	Wrocław	43
2	Patryk Dudek	Toruń	40
3	Bartosz Zmarzlik	Lublin	39
4	Dominik Kubera	Lublin	34
5	Piotr Pawlicki	Zielona Góra	28
6	Szymon Woźniak	Gorzów	25
7	Bartłomiej Kowalski	Wrocław	24
8	Przemysław Pawlicki	Zielona Góra	22
9	Kacper Woryna	Częstochowa	21
10	Bartosz Smektała	Leszno	19
11	Jarosław Hampel	Zielona Góra	18
12	Janusz Kołodziej	Leszno	17
13	Krzysztof Buczkowski	Bydgoszcz	13
14	Robert Chmiel	Opole	11
15	Paweł Przedpełski	Toruń	8
16	Mateusz Cierniak	Lublin	6
17	Tomasz Gapiński	Łódź	5
18	Wiktor Przyjemski	Lublin	4
19	Mateusz Szczepaniak	Bydgoszcz	3

=== Golden Helmet ===
The 2024 Golden Helmet organised by the Polish Motor Union (PZM) was the first major event of the 2024 season, with Poland's national coach selecting the participants. The winner Dominik Kubera and 2nd to 4th places sealed a place in the 2025 Speedway Grand Prix Qualification. Patryk Dudek was subsequently nominated as the Polish Federation Wild Card to take Poland's fifth berth for the qualifiers. The event also acted as a preliminary qualifier for the 2024 Speedway European Championship, with Kubera, Woryna, Pawlicki, Cierniak and Janowski earning their places in the SEC Qualifiers. However Kubera was forced to hand back his place as a current 2024 Speedway Grand Prix rider, leaving Piotr Pawlicki to take Poland's last place.

- Marian Spychała Speedway Stadium, Opole, 1 April 2024

Pos.	Rider	Pts	Total
1	Dominik Kubera	2, 3, 3, 2, 3	13
2	Kacper Woryna	3, 0, 2, 3, 3	11
3	Przemysław Pawlicki	3, 3, 3, 1, 0	10
4	Szymon Woźniak	3, 2, 1, 0, 3	9
5	Mateusz Cierniak	0, 1, 2, 3, 3	9
6	Patryk Dudek	2, 2, 3, 2, 0	9
7	Bartosz Zmarzlik	3, 2, 2, 1, 1	9
8	Maciej Janowski	1, 1, 1, 3, 2	8
9	Piotr Pawlicki	2, 0, 3, 2, 0	7
10	Bartosz Smektała	0, 3, 1, 1, 2	7
11	Bartłomiej Kowalski	1, 3, 2, 0, 1	7
12	Jaroslaw Hampel	1, 0, 1, 3, 1	6
13	Grzegorz Zengota	1, 2, 0, R, 2	5
14	Oskar Fajfer	2, 1, 0, 1, 0	4
15	Wiktor Przyjemski	0, 1, R, 2, 1	4
16	Tobiasz Musielak (res)	2	2
17	Maksym Drabik	0, 0, 0, NS, NS	0
18	Krzysztof Buczkowski (res)	0	0

=== Criterium of Aces ===
The Mieczysław Połukard Criterium of Aces was won by Bartosz Zmarzlik.

- Polonia Bydgoszcz Stadium, Bydgoszcz, 24 March 2024

Pos.	Rider	Pts	Total
1	Bartosz Zmarzlik	3, 3, 3, 3, 3	15
2	Szymon Woźniak	3, 3, 3, 0, 3	12
3	Artem Laguta	1, 3, 2, 3, 1	10+3
4	Jason Doyle	3, 3, t, 3, 2	10+2
5	Jaroslaw Hampel	3, 0, 1, 3, 2	9
6	Krzysztof Buczkowski	2, 2, 3, 2, 0	9
7	Kai Huckenbeck	2, 0, 2, 2, 3	9
8	Dominik Kubera	0, 2, 2, 2, 3	9
9	Patryk Dudek	0, 0, 3, 1, 2	6
10	Andžejs Ļebedevs	0, 2, 2, 1, 1	6
11	Andreas Lyager	1, 1, 1, 1, 2	6
12	Wiktor Przyjemski	3, 1, 1, 0, x	5
13	Maciej Janowski	2, 1, 0, 2, 0	5
14	Tim Sørensen	1, 2, 1, 0, 1	5
15	Mateusz Szczepaniak	1, 1, 0, 1, 1	4
16	Daniel Jeleniewski	0, 0, 0	0
17	Olivier Buszkiewicz (res)	0, 0	0
18	Franciszek Karczewski (res)	0	0

=== Polish U21 Championship ===
The Polish U21 Championship was held at MOSiR Stadium (Krosno) and was won by Jakub Krawczyk.

=== Silver Helmet ===
The Silver Helmet was held at Grudziądz Speedway Stadium and was won by Bartosz Bańbor.

=== Bronze Helmet ===
The Bronze Helmet was held at Polonia Piła Stadium and was won by Wiktor Przyjemski.

== Pairs ==
The 2024 Polish Pairs Speedway Championship (Polish: Mistrzostwa Polski par klubowych na żużlu) was the 2024 edition of the Polish Pairs Speedway Championship. The event was held at the Golęcin Speedway Stadium in Poznań on 6 April.

Pos	Team	Pts	Riders
1	Lublin	25	Bartosz Zmarzlik 18, Dominik Kubera 6, Jack Holder 1
2	KS Toruń	23	Robert Lambert 11+4, Patryk Dudek 8, Emil Sayfutdinov 4
3	Wrocław	22	Artem Laguta 10, Maciej Janowski 9, Dan Bewley 5
4	Leszno	17	Andžejs Ļebedevs 9, Bartosz Smektała 6, Grzegorz Zengota 2
5	Częstochowa	17	Leon Madsen 9, Kacper Woryna 8
6	Poznań	12	Aleksandr Loktaev 9, Szymon Szlauderbach 2, Mateusz Dul 1
7	Zielona Góra	10	Jarosław Hampel 7, Przemysław Pawlicki 2, Rasmus Jensen 1

== Team ==
The 2024 Team Speedway Polish Championship (Polish: Drużynowe mistrzostwa Polski na żużlu) was the 2024 edition of the Team Polish Championship to determine the gold medal winner (champion of Poland). Teams finishing second and third were awarded silver and bronze medals respectively.

=== Ekstraliga ===
The Ekstraliga season ran from 12 April to 29 September.

Pos	Team	P	W	D	L	BP	Pts
1	Lublin	14	12	0	2	7	31
2	Wrocław	14	7	1	6	4	19
3	Gorzów	14	8	0	6	3	19
4	Toruń	14	6	0	8	3	15
5	Grudziądz	14	6	0	8	2	14
6	Zielona Góra	14	4	2	8	3	13
7	Częstochowa	14	4	2	8	2	12
8	Leszno	14	5	1	8	0	11

Quarter-finals

Team 1	Team 2	Score
Zielona Góra	Lublin	36–54, 32–58
Wrocław	Grudziądz	50–40, 41–49
Toruń	Gorzów	42–48, 39–51

Semi-finals

Team 1	Team 2	Score
Toruń	Lublin	51–39, 31–59
Gorzów	Wrocław	44–46, 40–50

Third place

Team 1	Team 2	Score
Toruń	Gorzów	46–43, 54–36

Final

29 September	Sparta Wrocław; Artem Laguta 16; Dan Bewley 13; Maciej Janowski 6 Marcel Kowolik 4 Jakub Krawczyk 3 Bartłomiej Kowalski 1 Nikodem Mikołajczyk 0 Francis Gusts 0	43–47	Motor Lublin; Jack Holder 9 Bartosz Zmarzlik 9 Dominik Kubera 8 Mateusz Cierniak 8 Wiktor Przyjemski 5 Freddie Lindgren 4 Bartosz Bańbor 4	Olympic Stadium

7 October	Motor Lublin; Dominik Kubera 11; Jack Holder 9 Freddie Lindgren 9 Bartosz Zmarzlik 9 Bartosz Bańbor 7 Wiktor Przyjemski 4 Mateusz Cierniak 3 Bartosz Jaworski 0	52–38	Sparta Wrocław; Artem Laguta 14; Maciej Janowski 10; Dan Bewley 6 Bartłomiej Kowalski 5 Francis Gusts 2 Marcel Kowolik 1 Nikodem Mikołajczyk 0	MOSiR Stadium (Bystrzyca)

Leading averages

	Rider	Team	Average
1	(Russia) / (Poland) Artem Laguta	Wrocław	9.85
2	(Poland) Bartosz Zmarzlik	Lublin	9.68
3	(Denmark) Leon Madsen	Częstochowa	9.66
4	(England) Robert Lambert	Toruń	9.11
5	(Poland) Janusz Kołodziej	Leszno	8.78
6	(Russia) / (Poland) Emil Sayfutdinov	Toruń	8.76
7	(Slovakia) Martin Vaculík	Gorzów	8.60
8	(Denmark) Michael Jepsen Jensen	Grudziądz	8.44
9	(Denmark) Anders Thomsen	Gorzów	8.38
10	(Poland) Dominik Kubera	Lublin	8.38

=== Ekstraliga 2 ===
The Ekstraliga 2 fixtures will run from 12 April to 22 September.

Pos	Team	P	W	D	L	BP	Pts
1	Ostrów	14	11	0	3	6	28
2	Bydgoszcz	14	10	0	4	7	27
3	Rybnik	14	9	0	5	5	23
4	Krosno	14	8	0	6	3	19
5	Poznań	14	7	1	6	3	18
6	Łódź	14	5	0	9	3	13
7	Rzeszów	14	4	0	10	1	9
8	Gdańsk	14	1	1	12	0	3

Quarter-finals

Team 1	Team 2	Score
Łódź	Ostrów	42–48, 39–51
Poznań	Bydgoszcz	52–37, 38–51
Krosno	Rybnik	46–44, 39–51

Semi-finals

Team 1	Team 2	Score
Bydgoszcz	Ostrów	54–36, 42–48
Poznań	Rybnik	43–47, 44–46

Final

Team 1	Team 2	Score
Rybnik	Bydgoszcz	50–40, 41–49

Leading averages

	Rider	Team	Average
1	(Australia) Brady Kurtz	Rybnik	9.61
2	(Poland) Krzysztof Buczkowski	Bydgoszcz	9.40
3	(Russia) / (Poland) Gleb Chugunov	Ostrów	8.96
4	(Australia) Ryan Douglas	Poznan	8.86
5	(Australia) Chris Holder	Ostrów	8.69
6	(Ukraine) Aleksandr Loktaev	Poznan	8.55
7	(Denmark) Nicki Pedersen	Rzeszów	8.53
8	(France) Dimitri Bergé	Krosno	8.49
9	(Denmark) Frederik Jakobsen	Ostrów	8.46
10	(Germany) Kai Huckenbeck	Bydgoszcz	8.31

=== National League ===
The National League consists of six teams. Landshut Devils were forced to drop from the 1. Liga following the league changes, which also nullified the relegation of Poznań from that division. Kolejarz Rawicz were unable to secure a licence to race during 2024.

Pos	Team	P	W	D	L	BP	Pts
1	Gniezno	10	8	0	2	5	21
2	Tarnów	10	6	0	4	4	16
3	Piła	10	4	0	6	3	11
4	Opole	10	5	0	5	1	11
5	Daugavpils (Latvia)	10	4	0	6	2	10
6	Landshut (Germany)	10	3	0	7	0	6

Semi-finals

Team 1	Team 2	Score
Opole	Gniezno	44–46, 37–53
Piła	Tarnów	38–52, 42–48

Final

Team 1	Team 2	Score
Tarnów	Gniezno	51–38, 42–48

Leading averages

	Rider	Team	Average
1	(Finland) Timo Lahti	Tarnów	9.46
2	(Australia) Sam Masters	Gniezno	9.14
=3	(Poland) Robert Chmiel	Opole	9.09
=3	(England) Adam Ellis	Piła	9.09
5	(France) David Bellego	Tarnów	8.62
6	(Sweden) Kim Nilsson	Landshut	8.57
=7	(Poland) Kevin Fajfer	Gniezno	8.35
=7	(Ukraine) Marko Levishyn	Tarnów	8.35
9	(Norway) Mathias Pollestad	Piła	8.24
10	(Latvia) Daniils Kolodinskis	Daugavpils	8.08

=== Ekstraliga U24 ===
The Ekstraliga U24 season will run from 23 April to 17 September.

Pos	Team	P	W	D	L	BP	Pts
1	Wrocław	16	11	0	5	7	29
2	Gorzów	16	10	1	5	7	28
3	Leszno	16	11	0	5	5	27
4	Zielona Góra	16	7	2	7	4	20
5	Toruń	16	7	0	9	3	17
6	Częstochowa	16	7	0	9	3	17
7	Krosno	16	6	1	9	3	16
8	Grudziądz	16	6	0	10	2	14
9	Lublin	16	4	2	10	1	11

Final

Team 1	Team 2	Score
Gorzów	Wrocław	46–44, 40–50

== Squads ==
=== Ekstraliga ===
Częstochowa

- (Poland) Maksym Drabik
- (Poland) Kacper Halkiewicz
- (Denmark) Mads Hansen
- (Sweden) Anton Karlsson
- (Poland) Kajetan Kupiec
- (Poland) Szymon Ludwiczak
- (Denmark) Leon Madsen
- (Poland) Cezary Mercik
- (Denmark) Mikkel Michelsen
- (Poland) Igor Nabiałkowski
- (Ukraine) Andriy Rozaliuk
- (Poland) Bartosz Śmigielski
- (Poland) Szymon Wolski
- (Poland) Kacper Woryna

Gorzów

- (Poland) Oskar Fajfer
- (Poland) Jakub Miśkowiak
- (Poland) Oskar Paluch
- (Norway) Mathias Pollestad
- (Poland) Jakub Stojanowski
- (Denmark) Anders Thomsen
- (Slovakia) Martin Vaculík
- (Poland) Szymon Woźniak

Grudziądz

- (Australia) Jason Doyle
- (Australia) Max Fricke
- (Poland) Oliwier Kaźmierski
- (Australia) Jaimon Lidsey
- (Poland) Kacper Łobodziński
- (Poland) Kevin Małkiewicz
- (Poland) Kacper Pludra
- (Poland) Jan Przanowski
- (Russia) / (Poland) Vadim Tarasenko
- (Poland) Kacper Warduliński

Leszno

- (Poland) Hubert Jabłoński
- (Poland) Janusz Kołodziej
- (Latvia) Andžejs Ļebedevs
- (Poland) Antoni Mencel
- (Ukraine) Nazar Parnitskyi
- (Poland) Damian Ratajczak
- (Australia) Keynan Rew
- (Poland) Bartosz Smektała
- (Poland) Grzegorz Zengota

Lublin

- (Poland) Bartosz Bańbor
- (Poland) Mateusz Cierniak
- (Australia) Jack Holder
- (Poland) Bartosz Jaworski
- (Poland) Dominik Kubera
- (Sweden) Fredrik Lindgren
- (Poland) Wiktor Przyjemski
- (Poland) Jan Rachubik
- (Poland) Bartosz Zmarzlik

Toruń

- (Poland) Mateusz Affelt
- (Poland) Patryk Dudek
- (United Kingdom) Robert Lambert
- (Poland) Wiktor Lampart
- (Poland) Krzysztof Lewandowski
- (Poland) Paweł Przedpełski
- (Poland) Oskar Rumiński
- (Russia) / (Poland) Emil Sayfutdinov

Wrocław

- (Poland) Kacper Andrzejewski
- (United Kingdom) Dan Bewley
- (Latvia) Francis Gusts
- (Poland) Maciej Janowski
- (Poland) Bartłomiej Kowalski
- (Poland) Marcel Kowolik
- (Poland) Jakub Krawczyk
- (Russia) / (Poland) Artem Laguta
- (Poland) Nikodem Mikołajczyk
- (Poland) Filip Seniuk
- (Poland) Jakub Wiatrowski
- (United Kingdom) Tai Woffinden

Zielona Góra

- (Poland) Michał Curzytek
- (Poland) Jarosław Hampel
- (Sweden) Daniel Henderson
- (Poland) Oskar Hurysz
- (Denmark) Rasmus Jensen
- (Czech Republic) Jan Kvěch
- (Poland) Mateusz Łopuski
- (Poland) Przemysław Pawlicki
- (Poland) Piotr Pawlicki Jr.
- (Poland) Kacper Rychliński
- (Poland) Krzysztof Sadurski

=== Ekstraliga 2 ===
Bydgoszcz

- (Poland) Krzysztof Buczkowski
- (Poland) Oliwier Buszkiewicz
- (Poland) Bartosz Głogowski
- (Germany) Kai Huckenbeck
- (Poland) Franciszek Karczewski
- (Denmark) Andreas Lyager
- (Poland) Franciszek Majewski
- (Poland) Adrian Miedziński
- (Poland) Bartosz Nowak
- (Denmark) Tim Sørensen
- (Poland) Mateusz Szczepaniak

Gdańsk

- (United Kingdom) Tom Brennan
- (Poland) Adrian Gała
- (Denmark) Niels Kristian Iversen
- (Poland) Krzysztof Kasprzak
- (Denmark) Nicolai Klindt
- (Poland) Zbigniew Suchecki
- (Poland) Mateusz Tonder
- (Poland) Bartosz Tyburski
- (Poland) Miłosz Wysocki

Krosno

- (Poland) Szymon Bandur
- (France) Dimitri Bergé
- (Poland) Miłosz Duda
- (Poland) Norbert Krakowiak
- (Czech Republic) Václav Milík
- (Denmark) Jonas Seifert-Salk
- (Poland) Piotr Świercz
- (Poland) Kacper Szopa
- (Poland) Jakub Wieszczak
- (Poland) Patryk Wojdyło
- (Poland) Jakub Woźnik

Łódź

- (Poland) Mateusz Bartkowiak
- (Denmark) Benjamin Basso
- (United States) Luke Becker
- (Sweden) Oliver Berntzon
- (Poland) Tomasz Gapiński
- (Poland) Aleksander Grygolec
- (Poland) Daniel Kaczmarek
- (United Kingdom) Drew Kemp
- (Poland) Jakub Kiciński
- (Poland) Seweryn Orgacki
- (Poland) Piotr Pióro
- (Poland) Oskar Polis

Ostrów

- (Russia) / (Poland) Gleb Chugunov
- (Australia) Chris Holder
- (Denmark) Frederik Jakobsen
- (Poland) Wiktor Jasiński
- (Poland) Tobiasz Musielak
- (Poland) Tobiasz Potasznik
- (Poland) Gracjan Szostak
- (Poland) Sebastian Szostak

Poznań

- (Poland) Lech Chlebowski
- (Australia) Ryan Douglas
- (Poland) Mateusz Dul
- (Poland) Kacper Grzelak
- (Denmark) Michael Jepsen Jensen
- (Poland) Mateusz Latała
- (Ukraine) Aleksandr Loktaev
- (Denmark) Matias Nielsen
- (Poland) Szymon Szlauderbach
- (Poland) Kacper Teska

Rybnik

- (Germany) Norick Blödorn
- (United Kingdom) Leon Flint
- (Denmark) Patrick Hansen
- (Poland) Jakub Jamróg
- (Australia) Brady Kurtz
- (Poland) Kacper Tkocz
- (Poland) Szymon Tomaszewski
- (Poland) Pawel Trześniewski
- (Australia) Rohan Tungate
- (Poland) Grzegorz Walasek
- (Poland) Kamil Winkler

Rzeszów

- (Poland) Bartosz Curzytek
- (Slovenia) Matic Ivačič
- (Poland) Kryspin Jarosz
- (Poland) Rafał Karczmarz
- (Denmark) Peter Kildemand
- (Denmark) Jesper Knudsen
- (Poland) Konrad Mikłoś
- (Poland) Marcin Nowak
- (Denmark) Nicki Pedersen
- (Poland) Krystian Pieszczek
- (Poland) Jakub Poczta
- (Poland) Wiktor Rafalski
- (Poland) Mateusz Świdnicki
- (Sweden) Jacob Thorssell

=== National League ===
Daugavpils

- (Latvia) Wadim Antonewicz
- (Denmark) René Bach
- (Latvia) Artjoms Juhno
- (Latvia) Ņikita Kauliņš
- (Latvia) Daniils Kolodinskis
- (Latvia) Jevgeņijs Kostigovs
- (Latvia) Ernests Matjušonoks
- (Latvia) Oļegs Mihailovs
- (Latvia) Kjasts Puodžuks
- (Australia) Justin Sedgmen
- (Latvia) Māris Streļcovs
- (Sweden) Noel Wahlqvist
- (United Kingdom) Steve Worrall

Gniezno

- (Poland) Patryk Budniak
- (Poland) Jędrzej Chmura
- (Poland) Mikołaj Czapla
- (Poland) Kevin Fajfer
- (Poland) Kacper Gomólski
- (Sweden) Casper Henriksson
- (United Kingdom) Kyle Howarth
- (Denmark) Jesper Knudsen
- (Poland) Hubert Łęgowik
- (Australia) Sam Masters
- (Australia) Josh Pickering
- (Poland) Adrian Saks
- (Denmark) Tim Sørensen
- (Poland) Zbigniew Suchecki
- (Germany) Kevin Wölbert

Landshut

- (Germany) Erik Bachhuber
- (Germany) Lukas Baumann
- (Germany) Kacper Cymerman
- (Germany) Valentin Grobauer
- (Germany) Mario Häusl
- (Germany) Marius Hillebrand
- (Sweden) Antonio Lindbäck
- (Sweden) Kim Nilsson
- (Sweden) Victor Palovaara
- (Germany) Erik Riss
- (Germany) Sandro Wassermann

Opole

- (Denmark) Emil Breum
- (Poland) Robert Chmiel
- (Poland) Jakub Fabisz
- (Poland) Kacper Mateusz Grzelak
- (Sweden) Filip Hjelmland
- (Poland) Dastin Łukaszczyk
- (Ukraine) Stanisław Mielniczuk
- (Poland) Paweł Miesiąc
- (Poland) Tomasz Orwat
- (Denmark) Kevin Juhl Pedersen
- (Poland) Kacper Linek-Rekus
- (Poland) Kacper Siadak
- (Poland) Lars Skupień
- (Poland) Oskar Stępień
- (Sweden) Mathias Thörnblom

Piła

- (United Kingdom) Adam Ellis
- (United Kingdom) Dan Gilkes
- (Poland) Dawid Grzeszczyk
- (Denmark) Jonas Jeppesen
- (Denmark) Jonas Knudsen
- (Poland) Norbert Kościuch
- (Poland) Konrad Pawłowski
- (Poland) Viktor Trofimov Jr.
- (Poland) Błażej Wypior

Tarnów

- (France) David Bellego
- (Denmark) Kenneth Bjerre
- (Poland) Adrian Cyfer
- (Poland) Brajan Gromniak
- (Poland) Igor Gryzło
- (Poland) Jan Heleniak
- (Poland) Daniel Jeleniewski
- (Sweden) Timo Lahti
- (Ukraine) Marko Levishyn
- (Sweden) Peter Ljung
- (Poland) Sebastian Madej
- (Poland) Paweł Pikul
- (Poland) Piotr Wardzała

=== Ekstraliga U24 ===
Częstochowa

- (Sweden) Theo Bergqvist
- (Australia) Mitchell Cluff
- (France) Steven Goret
- (Poland) Kacper Halkiewicz
- (Denmark) Mads Hansen
- (Sweden) Anton Karlsson
- (Poland) Kajetan Kupiec
- (Poland) Szymon Ludwiczak
- (Poland) Cezary Mercik
- (Poland) Igor Nabiałkowski
- (Ukraine) Andriy Rozaliuk
- (Poland) Bartosz Śmigielski
- (Poland) Szymon Wolski

Gorzów

- (Czech Republic) Adam Bednář
- (Poland) Oskar Chatłas
- (Poland) Mikołaj Krok
- (Germany) Celina Liebmann
- (Denmark) Villads Nagel
- (Poland) Oskar Paluch
- (Poland) Piotr Piotrowski-Prędki
- (Norway) Mathias Pollestad
- (Poland) Jakub Stojanowski
- (Poland) Leon Szlegiel
- (Australia) Michael West

Grudziądz

- (Denmark) Nicklas Aagaard
- (Australia) Patrick Bæk
- (United Kingdom) Jason Edwards
- (Poland) Oliwier Kaźmierski
- (Poland) Kacper Łobodziński
- (Poland) Kevin Małkiewicz
- (Poland) Kacper Pludra
- (Poland) Jan Przanowski
- (France) Mathias Trésarrieu
- (Poland) Kacper Warduliński

Leszno

- (Poland) Hubert Jabłoński
- (Poland) Antoni Mencel
- (Poland) Jakub Oleksiak
- (Ukraine) Nazar Parnitskyi
- (Poland) Damian Ratajczak
- (Australia) Keynan Rew
- (Poland) Kuba Wojtynka
- (Poland) Jakub Żurek

Lublin

- (Poland) Bartosz Bańbor
- (Australia) Fraser Bowes
- (Sweden) Jonatan Grahn
- (United Kingdom) Luke Harrison
- (Poland) Bartosz Jaworski
- (Ukraine) Roman Kapustin
- (Austria) Sebastian Kössler
- (Latvia) Ernest Matjuszonok
- (Poland) Jan Młynarski
- (Denmark) Rasmus Pedersen
- (Poland) Jan Rachubik
- (Poland) Dawid Rempała

Toruń

- (Poland) Mateusz Affelt
- (Poland) Krzysztof Lewandowski
- (United Kingdom) Anders Rowe
- (Poland) Oskar Rumiński

Wrocław

- (Poland) Kacper Andrzejewski
- (Latvia) Francis Gusts
- (Poland) Bartłomiej Kowalski
- (Poland) Marcel Kowolik
- (Poland) Jakub Krawczyk
- (Poland) Nikodem Mikołajczyk
- (Poland) Filip Seniuk
- (Poland) Jakub Wiatrowski

Zielona Góra

- (Poland) Michał Curzytek
- (Poland) Oskar Hurysz
- (Poland) Mateusz Łopuski
- (Poland) Kacper Rychliński
- (Poland) Krzysztof Sadurski
- (Denmark) Rune Thorst
