= 2025 SGP2 =

World speedway event

World Under 21 Championship

The 2025 SGP2 series was the 49th edition of the FIM Individual Under-21 World Championship.

The three qualifying rounds were staged in Glasgow, Pardubice on 24 May and Debrecen on 7 June. The top four riders from each qualifying meeting progressed to the main SGP2 series. The qualifier at Glasgow was cut short due to bad weather and lots were drawn for the final qualifying place.

The main series held rounds in Malilla, Prague and Vojens from 4 July to 12 September.

== Qualifying ==
The 2025 season consisted of three qualifying events.

QR1 Glasgow
Pos	Rider	Pts
1	(Denmark) Mikkel Andersen	9
2	(England) Jake Mulford	7
3	(Poland) Jan Przanowski	7
4	(Poland) Antoni Mencel	6+
5	(Denmark) Villads Nagel	6+
6	(Australia) Tate Zischke	6+
7	(England) Joe Thompson	6+
8	(England) Ashton Boughen	5
9	(Sweden) Noel Wahlquist	4
10	(Australia) Michael West	3
11	(United States) Slater Lightcap	3
12	(Australia) Alex Adamson	3
13	(United States) Timmy Dion	2
14	(Czech Republic) Jan Jeníček	2
15	(Germany) Patricia Erhart	2
16	(Finland) Otto Raak	1

QR2 Pardubice
Pos	Rider	Pts
1	(Norway) Mathias Pollestad	15
2	(Poland) Wiktor Przyjemski	14
3	(Denmark) William Drejer	12+3
4	(Slovenia) Anže Grmek	12+2
5	(Poland) Pawel Sitek	10
6	(Sweden) Sammy van Dyck	10
7	(England) Sam Hagon	9
8	(Australia) James Pearson	9
9	(Austria) Sebastian Kössler	8
10	(Latvia) Nikita Kaulins	6
11	(Czech Republic) Jaroslav Vaníček	3
12	(United States) Alex Martin	3
13	(Czech Republic) Matouš Kameník	3
14	(Germany) Ben Iken	3
15	(Germany) Mario Hausl	2
16	(Czech Republic) Jan Hlacina (res)	1
17	(France) Tino Bouin	0
18	(Germany) David Hofman (res)	0

QR3 Debrecen
Pos	Rider	Pts
1	(Germany) Norick Blödorn	15
2	(Ukraine) Nazar Parnitskyi	14
3	(Poland) Kevin Małkiewicz	11+3
4	(Sweden) Casper Henriksson	11+2
5	(Australia) Mitchell McDiarmid	11+1
6	(Czech Republic) Adam Bednář	9
7	(Denmark) Jesper Knudsen	9
8	(Sweden) Rasmus Karlsson	9
9	(Denmark) Nicolai Heiselberg	8
10	(Germany) Patrick Hyjek	5
11	(Latvia) Damirs Filimonovs	4
12	(Hungary) Zoltán Lovas	4
13	(Ukraine) Roman Kapustin	4
14	(Australia) Luke Killeen	3
15	(Czech Republic) Bruno Belan	3
16	(Latvia) Artjoms Juhno	0

+Meeting abandoned after 12 heats due to rain. Lots were drawn for the final qualifying place.

== Main event ==
The 2025 season consisted of three rounds.

Round	Date	Venue	Winner
1	4 July	(Sweden) Skrotfrag Arena, Målilla	(Poland) Wiktor Przyjemski
2	1 August	(Latvia) Riga Speedway Stadium, Riga	(Czech Republic) Adam Bednář
3	12 September	(Denmark) Vojens Speedway Center, Vojens	(Ukraine) Nazar Parnitskyi

== Final Classification ==
Pos.	Rider	Points	(Sweden)	(Latvia)	(Denmark)
Gold	(Ukraine) (785) Nazar Parnitskyi	52	14	18	20
Silver	(Poland) (505) Wiktor Przyjemski	42	20	16	6
Bronze	(Denmark) (97) Mikkel Andersen	36	11	9	16
4	(Czech Republic) (79) Adam Bednář	35	4	20	11
5	(Denmark) (545) William Drejer	33	18	8	7
6	(Norway) (999) Mathias Pollestad	33	12	12	9
7	(Germany) (37) Norick Blödorn	31	5	14	12
8	(England) (237) Dan Thompson	27	6	7	14
9	(Poland) (305) Antoni Mencel	26	7	11	8
10	(Poland) (802) Kevin Małkiewicz	25	16	6	3
11	(Sweden) (43) Casper Henriksson	23	8	5	10
12	(Poland) (310) Jan Przanowski	20	9	10	1
13	(Denmark) (16) Bastian Pedersen	18	–	–	18
14	(Australia) (27) Mitchell McDiarmid	17	10	3	4
15	(Denmark) (108) Villads Nagel	5	–	–	5
16	(Latvia) (16) Nikita Kaulins	4	–	4	–
17	(Slovenia) (226) Anže Grmek	4	2	2	–
18	(England) (72) Jake Mulford	4	1	1	2
19	(Sweden) (16) Sammy Van Dyck	3	3	–	–

== See also ==
- 2025 Speedway Grand Prix
- 2025 Team Junior World Championship
