= 2022 Swedish speedway season =

Motorcycle racing competition

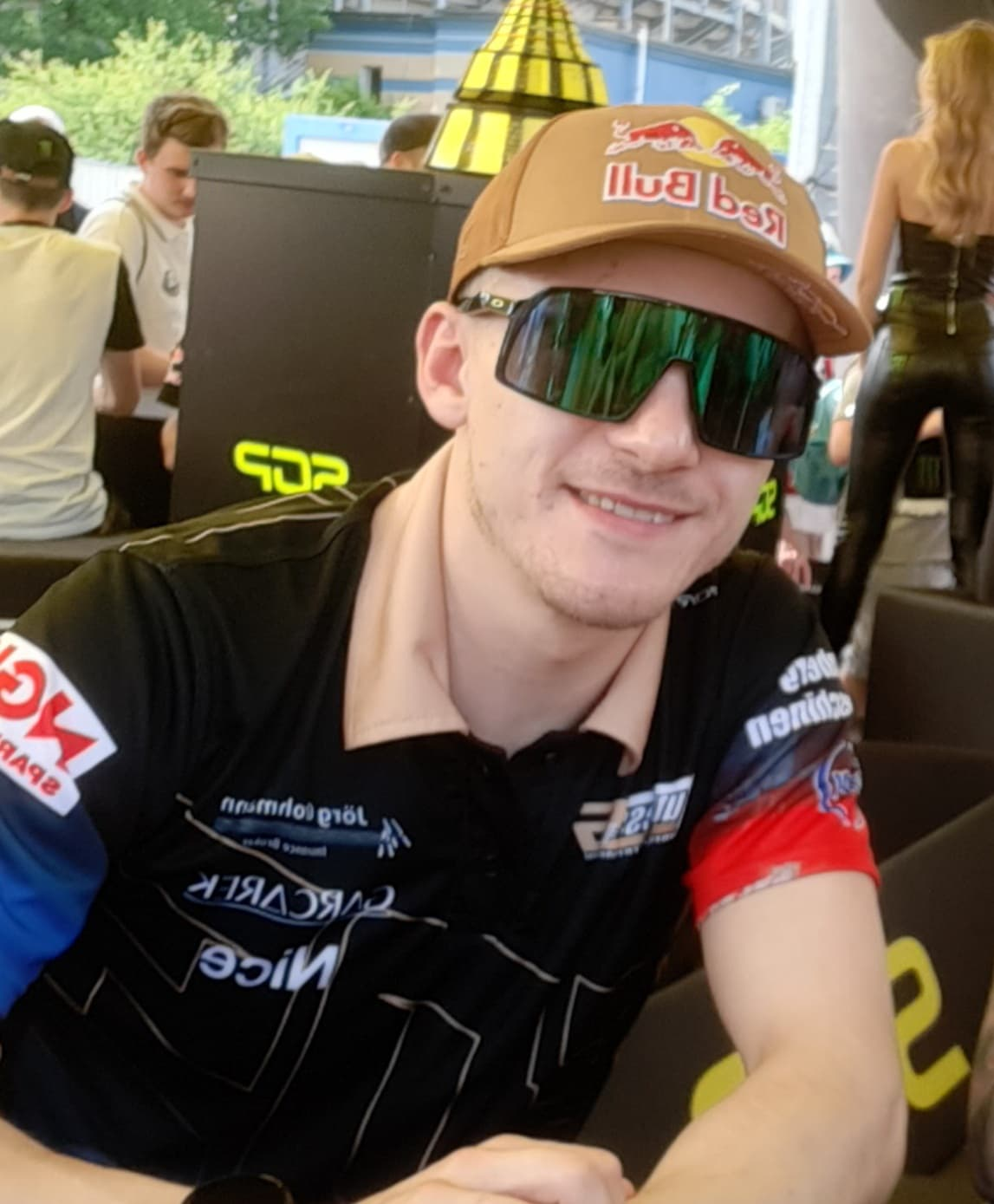
- Robert Lambert helped Smederna claim the Elitserien

The 2022 Swedish speedway season was the 2022 season of speedway in Sweden.

In March 2022, Vetlanda were declared bankrupt and would not compete during the season.

== Individual ==
=== Individual Championship ===
The 2022 Swedish Individual Speedway Championship was the 2022 version of the Swedish Individual Speedway Championship. The title was won by Oliver Berntzon.

The final was held at the Motorstadium in Linköping on 28 June 2022.

| Pos. | Rider | Team | Points | Total | Final |
|---|---|---|---|---|---|
| 1 | Oliver Berntzon | Lejonen | (3,3,2,3,2) | 13 | 3 |
| 2 | Jacob Thorssell | Dackarna | (3,1,3,3,3) | 13 | 2 |
| 3 | Kim Nilsson | Rospiggarna | (1,3,3,3,3) | 13 | 1 |
| 4 | Victor Palovaara | Rospiggarna | (2,2,1,1,3) | 9 | 0 |
| 5 | Antonio Lindbäck | Masarna | (1,3,2,3,1) | 10 | |
| 6 | Jonatan Grahn | Indianerna | (1,2,3,0,3) | 9 | |
| 7 | Ludvig Lindgren | Dackarna | (3,1,2,2,1) | 9 | |
| 8 | Philip Hellström Bängs | Masarna | (3,0,u,2,2) | 7 | |
| | Peter Ljung | Västervik | (2,2,1,2,d) | 7 | |
| 10 | Joel Andersson | Smederna | (1,0,3,1,1) | 6 | |
| | Thomas H. Jonasson | Piraterna | (2,2,0,2,0) | 6 | |
| | Daniel Henderson | Rospiggarna | (2,0,2,0,2) | 6 | |
| 13 | Anton Karlsson | Västervik | (0,1,1,1,1) | 4 | |
| 14 | Gustav Grahn | Indianerna | (0,3,w,0,0) | 3 | |
| | Casper Henriksson | Lejonen | (0,w,0,1,2) | 3 | |
| 16 | Rasmus Broberg | Piraterna | (1,0,0) | 1 | |
| | Christoffer Selvin | Indianerna | (0,1,-,-,-) | 1 | |
| 18 | Emil Millberg | Lejonen | res | 0 | |

== Team ==
=== Team Championship ===
Smederna won the Elitserien and were declared the winners of the Swedish Speedway Team Championship. Valsarna won the Allsvenskan (second-tier league).

==== Elitserien ====
| Pos | Team | P | W | D | L | BP | Pts |
|---|---|---|---|---|---|---|---|
| 1 | Smederna | 14 | 13 | 0 | 1 | 7 | 33 |
| 2 | Lejonen | 14 | 10 | 0 | 4 | 6 | 26 |
| 3 | Västervik | 14 | 10 | 1 | 3 | 4 | 25 |
| 4 | Indianerna | 14 | 6 | 1 | 7 | 2 | 15 |
| 5 | Rospiggarna | 14 | 5 | 0 | 9 | 3 | 13 |
| 6 | Dackarna | 14 | 4 | 0 | 10 | 3 | 11 |
| 7 | Piraterna | 14 | 4 | 0 | 10 | 2 | 10 |
| 8 | Masarna | 14 | 3 | 0 | 11 | 1 | 7 |

Quarter-finals

| Team 1 | Team 2 | Score |
|---|---|---|
| Rospiggarna | Västervik | 59–31, 41–49 |
| Indianerna | Dackarna | 41–49, 39–51 |

Semi-finals

| Team 1 | Team 2 | Score |
|---|---|---|
| Dackarna | Lejonen | 41–49, 37–53 |
| Rospiggarna | Smederna | 35–55, 43–47 |

Final

| Team 1 | Team 2 | Score |
|---|---|---|
| Smederna | Lejonen | 47–42, 48–42 |

==== Allsvenskan (second tier league) ====
| Pos | Team | P | W | D | L | BP | Pts |
|---|---|---|---|---|---|---|---|
| 1 | Vargarna | 10 | 5 | 0 | 5 | 4 | 14 |
| 2 | Valsarna | 10 | 5 | 0 | 5 | 4 | 14 |
| 3 | Indianerna B | 10 | 5 | 0 | 5 | 3 | 13 |
| 4 | Örnarna | 10 | 5 | 0 | 5 | 1 | 11 |
| 5 | Smålänningarna+ | 10 | 6 | 0 | 4 | 2 | 10+ |
| 6 | Griparna | 10 | 4 | 0 | 6 | 1 | 9 |

+ Smålänningarna failed to fulfil their final fixture and were fined 25,000 kronor and deducted 4 pts

Semi-finals

| Team 1 | Team 2 | Score |
|---|---|---|
| Örnarna | Valsarna | 43–47, 31–59 |
| Indianerna B | Vargarna | 43–47, 34–56 |

Final

| Team 1 | Team 2 | Score |
|---|---|---|
| Valsarna | Vargarna | 51–39, 57–33 |

==== Division One (third tier league) ====
| Pos | Team | P | Pts |
|---|---|---|---|
| 1 | Indianerna C | 11 | 27 |
| 2 | Team Dalej | 11 | 25 |
| 3 | Smederna B | 12 | 18 |
| 4 | Speedway 054 | 12 | 14 |
| 5 | Vikingarna | 12 | 13 |
| 6 | Masarna/Vargarna | 10 | 13 |
| 7 | Njudungarna | 11 | 8 |

== See also ==
- Speedway in Sweden
