= 2022 European Under 23 Team Speedway Championship =

2022 motorcycle competition

The 2022 Team Speedway Junior European Championship was the 15th Team Speedway Junior European Championship season. It was organised by the Fédération Internationale de Motocyclisme and was the second time that the event had an age limit of under 23 years of age.

Qualifying events were staged at Pardubice in the Czech Republic and Elgane in Norway.

The final took place on 9 October 2022 in Tarnów, Poland. The defending champions Poland won again to claim the title for the 12th time.

== Results ==
=== Final ===
- Tarnów, Poland
- 9 October 2022

Pos.	National team	Pts.	Scorers
1	Poland	46	Bartlomiej Kowalski 13, Jakub Miśkowiak 12, Wiktor Lampart 8, Mateusz Cierniak 7, Dominik Kubera 6
2	Denmark	38	Matias Nielsen 10, Jonas Seifert-Salk 10, Mads Hansen 10, Tim Sørensen 8, Kevin Juhl Pedersen dnr
3	Great Britain	23	Dan Bewley 13, Leon Flint 4, Tom Brennan 3, Drew Kemp 3, Jason Edwards dnr
4	Sweden	13	Jonatan Grahn 6, Anton Karlsson 5, Casper Henriksson 2, Noel Wahlqvist 0, Ludvig Selvin 0

== See also ==
- 2022 World Junior Championship
- 2022 Individual Speedway Junior European Championship
