= 2024 European Under-19 Individual Speedway Championship =

European motorcycle speedway event

- Start date: 29 June
- End date: 3 October

Champion
- Nazar Parnitskyi

The 2024 European Under-19 Individual Speedway Championship was the 24th edition of the European Under-19 Individual Speedway Championship and the 27th season of European Junior Speedway staged by FIM Europe. The semi finals were held at the Plzeň speedway track in the Czech Republic, on 29 June (won by Wiktor Przyjemski) and Güstrow Speedway Stadium in Germany, on 7 September (won by Bastian Pedersen.

The final was staged at the Sandbahn Rennen Herxheim in Germany on 3 October 2024. In 2024, Nazar Parnitskyi made history as the first Ukrainian winner of a major speedway championship after winning the gold medal.

== Semi-finals ==
- 29 June
- (Czech Republic) Plzeň speedway track, Plzeň
- Top 8 to final

Pos.	Rider	Points
1	(Poland) Wiktor Przyjemski	13
2	(Denmark) Villads Nagel	13
3	(Ukraine) Nazar Parnitskyi	12
4	(Czech Republic) Matouš Kamenik	11
5	(Poland) Bartosz Bańbor	11
6	(United Kingdom) Luke Killeen	10
7	(Denmark) Mikkel Andersen	10
8	(Poland) Pawel Trzesniewski	9
9	(United Kingdom) Ashton Boughen	8
10	(Germany) Patrick Hyjek	5
11	(Czech Republic) Jaroslav Vaníček	5
12	(Sweden) Dante Johansson	4
13	(Ukraine) Roman Kapustin	3
14	(Czech Republic) Matej Fryza (res)	3
15	(Denmark) Nicolai Heiselberg	1
16	(Netherlands) Niek Meijerink	1
17	(Czech Republic) Bruno Belan (res)	1
18	(Poland) Antoni Mencel	0

- 7 September
- (Germany) Güstrow Speedway Stadium, Güstrow
- Top 8 to final

Pos.	Rider	Points
1	(Denmark) Bastian Pedersen	14+3
2	(Poland) Oskar Paluch	14+2
3	(Sweden) Sammy Van Dyck	11
4	(Poland) Kacper Halkiewicz	11
5	(Czech Republic) Adam Bednář	11
6	(United Kingdom) Luke Harrison	8
7	(Denmark) William Drejer	8
8	(Czech Republic) Jan Jeníček	7
9	(Sweden) Alfred Aberg	7
10	(Germany) Ben Iken	7
11	(France) Tino Bouin	6
12	(Sweden) Rasmus Karlsson	5
13	(Germany) Hannah Grunwald	4
14	(United Kingdom) Ben Trigger	3
15	(Finland) Otto Raak	2
16	(Norway) Magnus Klipper	1
17	(Germany) Magnus Rau (res)	0

== Final ==
- 3 October 2024
- (Germany) Sandbahn Rennen Herxheim

Pos.	Rider	Points
1	(Ukraine) Nazar Parnitskyi	13+3
2	(Denmark) Bastian Pedersen	13+2
3	(Poland) Wiktor Przyjemski	12
4	(Denmark) Mikkel Andersen	11
5	(Denmark) Villads Nagel	10
6	(Poland) Bartosz Bańbor	10
7	(Czech Republic) Adam Bednář	8
8	(Poland) Pawel Trzesniewski	8
9	(Poland) Oskar Paluch	8
10	(United Kingdom) Luke Killeen	7
11	(Sweden) Sammy Van Dyck	6
12	(Poland) Kacper Halkiewicz	5
13	(Germany) Ben Iken (res)	4
14	(United Kingdom) Luke Harrison	3
15	(United Kingdom) Ashton Boughen	2
16	(Czech Republic) Jan Jeníček	0
17	(Czech Republic) Matouš Kamenik	0

== See also ==
- 2024 Speedway European Championship
