= 2024 Speedway of Nations 2 =

Motorcycle racing competition

- Venue: National Speedway Stadium
- Location: Manchester, England
- Start date: 12 July 2024
- End date: 12 July 2024

The 2024 Speedway of Nations 2 (SON2) was the 20th Team Under-21 World Championship season, organised by the FIM. The event took place on 12 July 2024 at the National Speedway Stadium in Manchester, England.

The competition was won by Poland. Sweden finished second ahead of Australia on countback, while hosts Great Britain ended up just outside of the medals in fourth position.

== Final ==
- (England) Manchester
- 12 July 2024

Pos	Nation	Riders	Pts
1	Poland	Bartosz Bańbor 22, Wiktor Przyjemski 19	41
2	Sweden	Philip Hellström Bängs 23, Casper Henriksson 15	38
3	Australia	Keynan Rew 27, James Pearson 11	38
4	Great Britain	Leon Flint 22, Dan Thompson 8, Sam Hagon 5	35
5	Denmark	Bastian Pedersen 20, Villads Nagel 11, Jesper Knudsen 0	31
6	Germany	Norick Blodorn 25, Patrick Hyjek 4, Jonny Wynant 0	29
7	Czech Republic	Adam Bednář 14, Jan Jeníček 5, Matouš Kameník 2	21
8	Latvia	Artjoms Juhno 10, Nikita Kaulins 7	17

== See also ==
- 2024 SGP2
