= 2009 Swedish speedway season =

Motorcycle racing competition

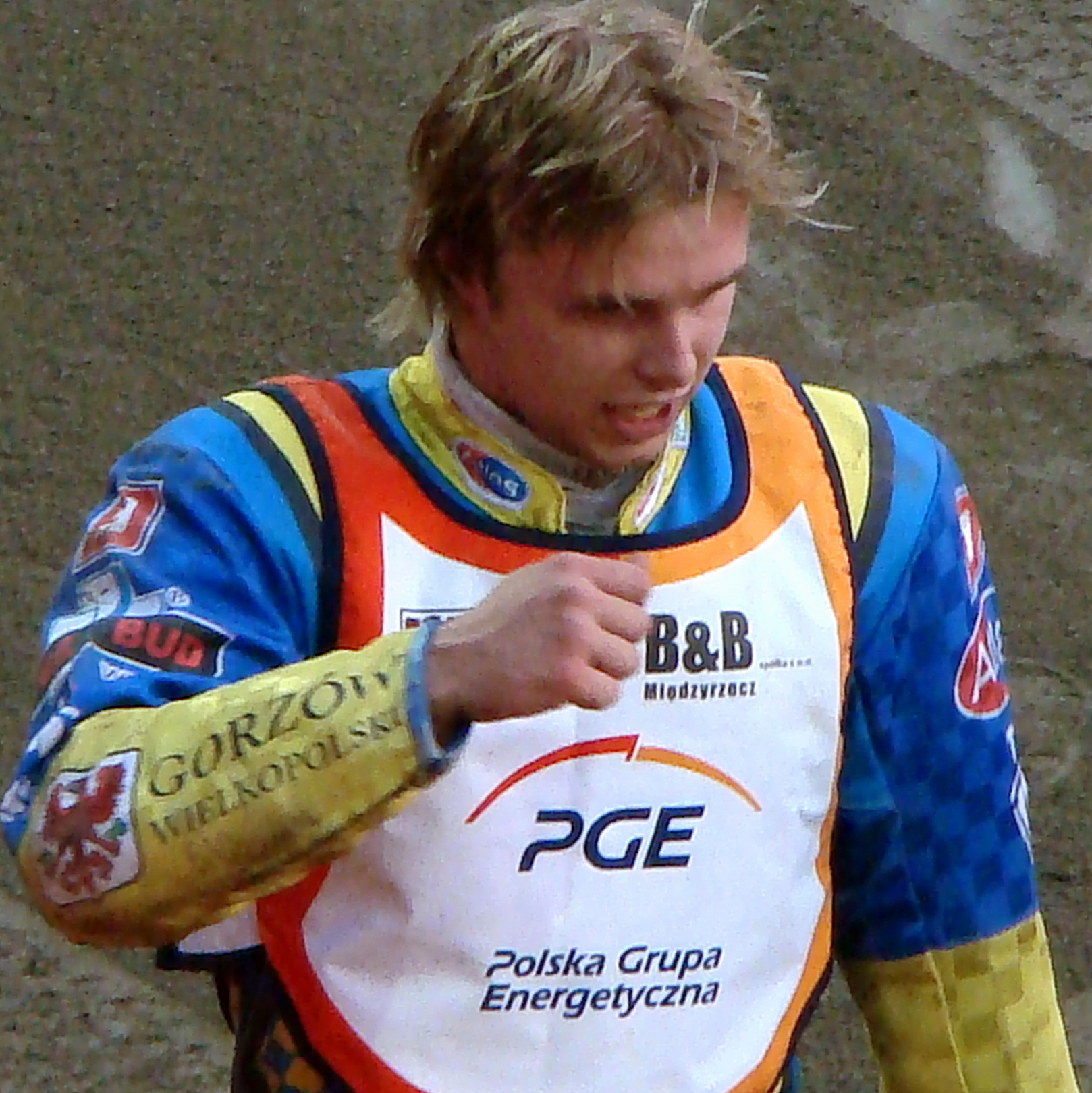
- Thomas Hjelm Jonasson was the 2009 U21 champion.

The 2009 Swedish speedway season was the 2009 season of motorcycle speedway in Sweden.

== Individual ==
=== Individual Championship ===
The 2009 Swedish Individual Speedway Championship final was held at the G&B Stadium in Målilla on 25 July. Andreas Jonsson won the Swedish Championship for the third time.

Pos	Rider	Team	Pts	Total	SF	Final
1	Andreas Jonsson	Dackarna	(3,3,1,3,3)	13	x	3
2	Freddie Lindgren	Dackarna	(3,ef,2,3,2)	10	3	2
3	Thomas H. Jonasson	Vetlanda	(2,3,3,1,3)	12	x	1
4	Peter Karlsson	Dackarna	(3,1,3,2,2)	11	x	0
5	Jonas Davidsson	Piraterna	(1,1,2,3,3)	10	1	
6	David Ruud	Lejonen	(2,3,2,2,1)	10	0	
7	Mikael Max	Lejonen	(1,1,1,2,3)	8	2	
8	Magnus Zetterström	Indianerna	(1,3,2,0,1)	7		
9	Daniel Nermark	Piraterna	(2,2,0,1,2)	7		
10	Ludvig Lindgren	Dackarna	(0,2,3,1,0)	6		
10	Antonio Lindbäck	Piraterna	(3,2,1,0,ef)	6		
12	Eric Andersson	Masarna	(1,2,0,2,1)	6		
13	Freddie Eriksson	Getingarna	(0,0,0,3,2)	5		
14	Henrik Gustafsson	Rospiggarna	(2,0,1,1,1)	5		
15	Peter Ljung	Vetlanda	(ef,1,3,0,ef)	4		
16	Daniel Davidsson	Valsarna	(0,0,0,0,0)	0		

Key

- points per race - 3 for a heat win, 2 for 2nd, 1 for third, 0 for last
- ef - engine failure

=== U21 Championship ===
Thomas H. Jonasson won the U21 championship.

== Team ==
=== Team Championship ===
Lejonen won the Elitserien and were declared the winners of the Swedish Speedway Team Championship for the second successive year.

Valsarna won the Allsvenskan after winning the play offs.

Elitserien
Pos	Team	Pts
1	Vetlanda	28
2	Västervik	22
3	Lejonen	18
4	Vargarna	18
5	Dackarna	17
6	Indianerna	16
7	Piraterna	14
8	Rospiggarna	7

Allsvenskan
Pos	Team	Pts
1	Valsarna	20
2	Solkatterna	17
3	Örnarna	16
4	Hammarby	12
5	Griparna	12
6	Masarna	7
7	Getingarna	0

Play offs

Elitserien
Stage	Team	Team	Agg Score
QF	Lejonen	Dackarna	104:88
QF	Vetlanda	Indianerna	100:92
QF	Vargarna	Vastervik	101:91
SF	Lejonen	Indianerna	101:91
SF	Vargarna	Vetlanda	100:91
Final	Lejonen	Vargarna	108:88

Allsvenskan
Stage	Team	Team	Agg Score
QF	Solkatterna	Griparna	99:92
QF	Ornarna	Hammarby	99:93
QF	Valsarna	Masarna	81:67
SF	Ornarna	Solkatterna	105:87
SF	Valsarna	Hammarby	103:89
Final	Valsarna	Ornarna	86:86

Division 1
Pos	Team	Pts
1	Gnistorna	30
2	Gasarna	26
3	Team Hagfors	25
4	Team Bikab	25
5	Mallia	20
6	Stjarnorna Hallstavik	16
7	Filbyterna	16
8	Indianerna Kumla	14
9	Pirates Motala	6
10	Eldarna	0
