= 2015 Swedish speedway season =

Motorcycle racing competition

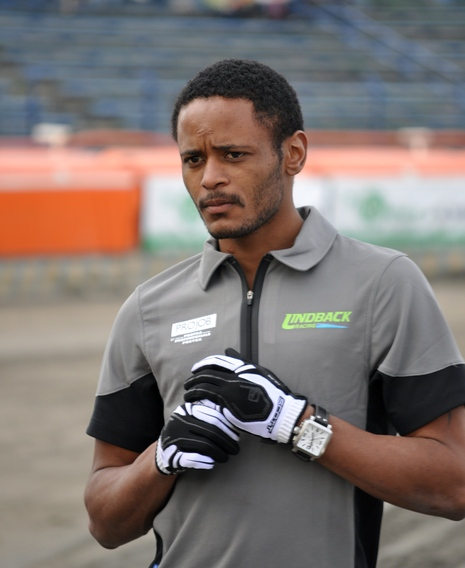
- Antonio Lindbäck was the 2105 Swedish champion

The 2015 Swedish speedway season was the 2015 season of motorcycle speedway in Sweden.

== Individual ==
=== Individual Championship ===
The 2015 Swedish Individual Speedway Championship final was held at the Parken in Hallstavik on 1 August. Antonio Lindbäck won the Swedish Championship.

Pos	Rider	Team	Pts	Total	SF	Final
1	Antonio Lindbäck	Indianerna	(2,3,3,3,3)	14		3
2	Andreas Jonsson	Rospiggarna	(3,3,3,3,2)	14		2
3	Peter Ljung	Vetlanda	(1,2,1,2,3)	9	3	1
4	Joonas Kylmäkorpi	Dacckarna	(f,3,2,3,3)	11		0
5	Peter Karlsson	Smederna	(3,1,3,0,2)	9	2	
6	Pontus Aspgren	Lejonen	(1,2,3,1,3)	10	1	
7	Freddie Lindgren	Indianerna	(3,2,2,3,1)	11	0	
8	Joel Andersson	Indianerna	(0,3,1,2,1)	7		
9	Mikael Max	Gnistorna	(2,0,2,1,2)	7		
10	Linus Sundström	Masarna	(2,2,1,1,1)	7		
11	Ricky Kling	Vastervik	(3,1,0,2,0)	6		
12	Thomas H. Jonasson	Vetlanda	(1,1,r,2,2)	6		
13	Kenny Wennerstam	Vastervik	(1,0,2,1,0)	4		
14	Jacob Thorssell	Vastervik	(2,1,0,0,0)	3		
15	Mathias Thörnblom	Gnistorna	(r,r,1,0,1)	2		
16	Magnus Karlsson	Ornarna	(0,0,0,r,0)	0		

Key

- points per race - 3 for a heat win, 2 for 2nd, 1 for third, 0 for last
- r - retired
- f - fell

=== U21 Championship ===
Fredrik Engman won the U21 championship for the third successive year.

== Team ==
=== Team Championship ===
Vetlanda won the Elitserien and were declared the winners of the Swedish Speedway Team Championship for the eighth time.

Masarna won the Allsvenskan.

Elitserien
Pos	Team	Pts
1	Vetlanda	25
2	Indianerna	21
3	Piraterna	20
4	Dackarna	16
5	Smederna	11
6	Rospiggarna	8
7	Lejonen	3

Allsvenskan
Pos	Team	Pts
1	Masarna	30
2	Vargarna	18
3	Västervik	17
4	Griparna	14
5	Örnarna	12
6	Valsarna	10
7	Gnistorna	4

Play offs

Elitserien
Stage	Team	Team	Agg Score
SF	Indianerna	Piraterna	92:88
SF	Vetlanda	Dackarna	106:74
Final	Vetlanda	Indianerna	96:78

Allsvenskan
Stage	Team	Team	Agg Score
SF	Masarna	Västervik	112:68
SF	Vargarna	Griparna	104:76
Final	Masarna	Vargarna	109:70
