= 2022 European Under-19 Individual Speedway Championship =

European motorcycle speedway event

The 2022 European Individual Speedway Junior Championship was the 25th edition of the Championship. Three qualifying heats took place in Vetlanda Motorstadion (11 June), Žarnovica (30 July) and Plzeň speedway track (3 September).

The final was staged on 7 August, at Nagyhalász Speedway Ring, Nagyhalász in Hungary and was won by Jesper Knudsen of Denmark.

== Final ==
- 17 September 2022
- (Hungary) Nagyhalász Speedway Ring, Nagyhalász

Pos.	Rider	Points	Details
1	(Denmark) Jesper Knudsen	11	(2, 3, 3, 3)
2	(Norway) Mathias Pollestad	10	(3, 2, 3, 2)
3	(Sweden) Casper Henriksson	8	(0, 3, 2, 3)
	(Poland) Franciszek Karczewski	8	(X, 2, 3, 3)
	(Poland) Jakub Krawczyk	8	(1, 3, 2, 2)
6	(Germany) Norick Blödorn	7	(3, X, 3, 1)
	(Poland) Damian Ratajczak	7	(0, 3, 1, 3)
	(Denmark) Nicolai Heiselberg	7	(3, 1, 1, 2)
9	(Poland) Wiktor Przyjemski	6	(2, 2, 2, 0)
	(Germany) Erik Bachhuber	6	(3, 2, 0, 1)
11	(Denmark) William Drejer	5	(1, X, 2, 2)
12	(Poland) Kacper Grzelak	4	(2, 1, 1, X)
13	(Poland) Antoni Mencel	3	(1, 1, 0, 1)
	(Poland) Oskar Paluch	3	(2, 1, X, R)
	(Slovenia) Anže Grmek	3	(1, 0, 1, 1)
16	(Hungary) Richard Fuzesi	0	(0, 0, 0, 0)
17	(Sweden) Gustav Grahn	DNR	

- meeting abandoned after 16 heats (results stand)

== See also ==
- 2022 Speedway European Championship
