= Tommy Pettersson =

Swedish speedway rider

- Born: 29 December 1952 (age 73); Norrköping, Sweden
- Nationality: Swedish

Career history

Sweden
- 1971–1979: Vargarna
- 1981–1988: Smederna

Great Britain
- 1977: Bristol Bulldogs
- 1977: Leicester Lions

Individual honours
- 1972: Swedish U21 champion

Thomas Pettersson better known as Tommy Pettersson (born 29 December 1952) is a Swedish former motorcycle speedway rider. He earned seven caps for the Sweden national speedway team.

== Career ==
Born in Norrköping, Pettersson learnt to ride a speedway bike in England, at Olle Nygren's training school in Boston. He made his competitive debut in 1971 for his home town team Vargarna, and won the Swedish Junior Championship the following year.

Pettersson rode for Sweden in test matches against the Soviet Union in 1973 and England in 1974, and was due to tour England with Sweden in 1975 and ride for Reading Racers but a broken leg from a racing crash ruled him out.

In 1976, Pettersson signed for Birmingham Brummies but a dispute between Birmingham and Vargarna meant that he only appeared in three challenge matches for Birmingham. He returned to Britain in 1977, first with Bristol Bulldogs and then a longer spell with Leicester Lions.
