= Norrköping Motorstadion =

Stadium in Norrköping, Sweden

- Location: Norrköpings Motorstadion, 605 91 Norrköping, Sweden
- Coordinates: 58°35′39″N 16°14′48″E
- Operator: Vargarna motorcycle speedway
- Opened: 1969
- Length: 0.271 km (0.168 mi)

Norrköping Motorstadion also called the Boardic Arena (for sponsorship purposes) is a motorcycle speedway track located in the western outskirts of Norrköping. The track is located just off the Lindövägen and is adjacent to the SMK Östgöta MC Kråkvilan complex, which includes motocross and enduro.

The stadium hosts the Vargarna speedway team that compete in the Swedish Speedway Team Championship and have been champions of Sweden on six occasions.

== History ==
The stadium held its first meeting on 6 September 1969 and was ready for the 1970 Swedish speedway season.

The stadium hosted the Nordic Speedway Final, which formed part of the World Championship in 1972. Eight more finals were held at the track in 1973, 1976, 1978, 1979, 1981, 1984, 1987 and 1998. In addition, it has hosted the Swedish Individual Speedway Championship in 1986 and 1999.

Leading into the 2015 Swedish speedway season the track dimensions were changed with the widening of the bends and the track measurement altering from 279 metres to 271 metres.

== Track records ==
- 279m Tony Rickardsson 57.0 seconds, 30 June 1998
- 279m Jason Crump =57.0 seconds, 10 August 2010
- 271m Kim Nilsson 56.1 seconds, 21 July 2016
