= Helge Brinkeback =

Swedish speedway rider (1918–1983)

- Born: 14 April 1918; Norrköping, Sweden
- Died: 14 June 1983 (aged 65)
- Nationality: Swedish

Career history
- 1948–1952: Vargarna

Individual honours
- 1950, 1951: Swedish Champion

Team honours
- 1949, 1951: Swedish Team Championship

Helge Ivar Brinkeback (14 April, 1918–14 June, 1983) was an international motorcycle speedway rider from Sweden. He was twice champion of Sweden.

== Career ==
Brinkeback made his Swedish leagues debut during the 1948 Swedish speedway season for Vargarna. The following season in 1949, he had a very successful season, after reaching the Swedish Individual Speedway Championship final in Stockholm, where he finished in ninth place and making his debut for the Sweden national speedway team, when Sweden beat Poland in a test match. He also won the Swedish Team Championship with Vargarna.

Brinkeback continued to consolidate his position as one of speedway's leading riders of the period, when he became the champion of Sweden, after winning the 1950 Swedish individual title. In addition, his team finished runner up behind Filbyterna.

Brinkeback then successfully defended his Swedish crown in 1951 and won a second league championship with Vargarna.

== Other pursuits ==
In addition to his speedway career, Brinkeback appeared in the Swedish film Farlig Kurva in 1952.
