= 2024 SGP2 =

World speedway event

World Under 21 Championship

The 2024 SGP2 series was the 48th edition of the FIM Individual Under-21 World Championship. It was once again staged as the SGP2 class of the FIM Speedway Grand Prix series after rights holders Discovery Sports Events took over promotional rights to the competition in 2022.

The three qualifying rounds were staged at Mâcon, Terenzano and Ludwigslust on 8 June. Participant riders were named by national federations, with a pre-qualifier staged by the DMU for Danish riders and the Polish Silver Helmet acting as a qualifier for Polish riders.

The top four riders from each qualifying meeting progressed to the main SGP2 series. Villads Nagel, Bartosz Bańbor and Mikkel Andersen were then named as the three permanent wildcards by the SGP Commission, joining the 12 qualifiers in the main series.

The title was won by Wiktor Przyjemski. It was the fourth year in succession that the Under-21 World Championship had been won by a rider from Poland.

== Qualifying ==
The 2024 season consisted of three qualifying events.

QR3 Mâcon
Pos	Rider	Pts
1	(Sweden) Casper Henriksson	14
2	(Poland) Wiktor Przyjemski	13
3	(Denmark) William Drejer	12+3
4	(England) Leon Flint	12+2
5	(Denmark) Mikkel Andersen	12+1
6	(Austria) Sebastian Kössler	9
7	(United States) Alex Martin	8
8	(Australia) Tate Zischke	8
9	(England) Ashton Boughen	7
10	(Latvia) Nikita Kaulins	7
11	(Czech Republic) Matouš Kameník	5
12	(Norway) Magnus Klipper	3
13	(Germany) Marlon Hegener	3
14	(France) Antoine Desserprix	2
15	(Germany) Erik Bachhuber	1
16	(France) Tino Bouin	1
Res	(France) Téo Tauzin	2
Res	(France) Théo Bernard	1

QR2 Terenzano
Pos	Rider	Pts
1	(Poland) Sebastian Szostak	14
2	(Denmark) Bastian Pedersen	13
3	(Poland) Jakub Krawczyk	12+3
4	(Latvia) Francis Gusts	12+2
5	(Denmark) Villads Nagel	12+1
6	(England) Dan Thompson	10
7	(Slovenia) Anže Grmek	9
8	(Germany) Patrick Hyjek	8
9	(Italy) Matteo Boncinelli	6
10	(England) Joe Thompson	5
11	(Czech Republic) Jaroslav Vaníček	5
12	(Australia) Harrison Ryan	5
13	(Sweden) Ludvig Selvin	4
14	(Hungary) Richárd Füzesi	2
15	(Italy) Mattia Santinelli	2
16	(Argentina) Milton Besagonil	1
Res	(Germany) Julian Kuny	dnr

QR1 Ludwigslust
Pos	Rider	Pts
1	(Ukraine) Nazar Parnitskyi	15
2	(Denmark) Jesper Knudsen	12+3
3	(Norway) Mathias Pollestad	12+2
4	(Sweden) Philip Hellström Bängs	11
5	(United States) Slater Lightcap	10
6	(Poland) Bartosz Bańbor	10
7	(Poland) Kacper Łobodziński	8
8	(Czech Republic) Jan Jeníček	7
9	(England) Sam Hagon	7
10	(Czech Republic) Adam Bednář	6
11	(Sweden) Anton Jansson	6
12	(Australia) Michael West	5
13	(Finland) Otto Raak	5
14	(Latvia) Artjoms Juhno	4
15	(Germany) Ben Iken	2
16	(Germany) Jonny Wynant	0
Res	(Germany) Hannah Grunwald	1
Res	(Germany) Tom Meyer	0

== Main event ==
The 2024 season consisted of three rounds.

Round	Date	Venue	Winner
1	14 June	(Sweden) Skrotfrag Arena, Målilla	(Poland) Wiktor Przyjemski
2	6 September	(Latvia) Riga Speedway Stadium, Riga	(Ukraine) Nazar Parnitskyi
3	27 September	(Poland) MotoArena Toruń, Toruń	(Norway) Mathias Pollestad

== Final Classification ==
Pos.	Rider	Points	(Sweden)	(Latvia)	(Poland)
Gold	(Poland) (505) Wiktor Przyjemski	56	20	18	18
Silver	(Ukraine) (785) Nazar Parnitskyi	46	10	20	16
Bronze	(Norway) (999) Mathias Pollestad	43	11	12	20
4	(Denmark) (97) Mikkel Andersen	39	12	16	11
5	(Sweden) (243) Philip Hellström Bängs	36	14	8	14
6	(Poland) (137) Bartosz Bańbor	27	18	5	4
7	(Poland) (355) Sebastian Szostak	26	16	10	–
8	(Latvia) (144) Francis Gusts	26	7	7	12
9	(Poland) (110) Jakub Krawczyk	20	6	14	0
11	(England) (22) Leon Flint	18	8	3	7
11	(Denmark) (388) Bastian Pedersen	16	3	11	2
12	(Denmark) (117) Jesper Knudsen	16	4	2	10
13	(Sweden) (43) Casper Henriksson	15	1	9	5
14	(Denmark) (108) Villads Nagel	14	5	6	3
15	(Denmark) (545) William Drejer	13	9	4	–
16	(Poland) (17) Oskar Paluch	9	–	–	9
17	(England) (89) Dan Thompson	8	–	–	8
18	(Poland) (16) Antoni Kawczyński	6	–	–	6
19	(Sweden) (16) Anton Jansson	2	2	–	–
20	(Latvia) (16) Nikita Kaulins	1	–	1	–
21	(United States) (28) Slater Lightcap	1	–	–	1
22	(Sweden) (17) Sammy Van Dyck	0	0	–	–
23	(Poland) (18) Krzysztof Lewandowski	0	–	–	0

== See also ==
- 2024 Speedway Grand Prix
- 2024 Team Junior World Championship
