= Bartosz Bańbor =

Polish speedway rider

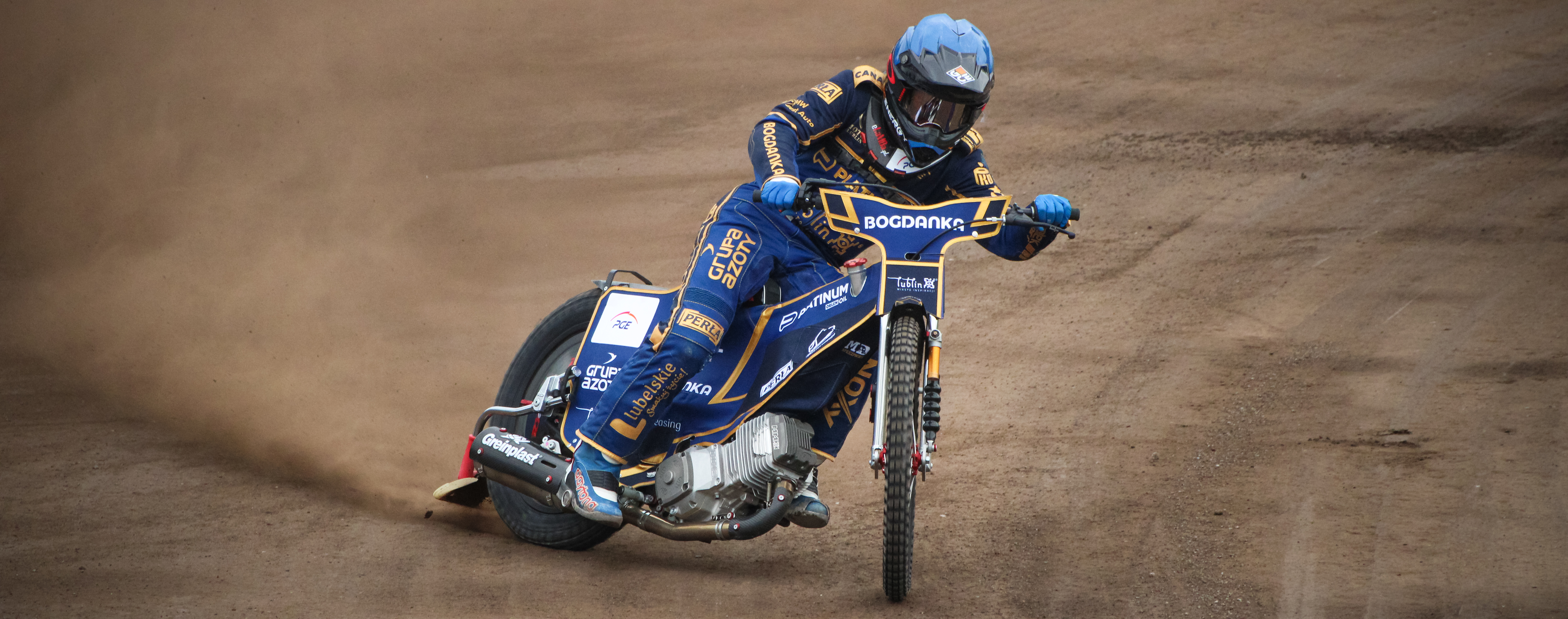
- Bartosz Bańbor
- Born: 13 January 2007 (age 19); Poland
- Nationality: Polish

Career history

Poland
- 2023–2025: Lublin

Team honours
- 2024: U21 team world champion
- 2024: European U23 champion
- 2024: Polish champions

Bartosz Bańbor (born 13 January 2007) is an international speedway rider from Poland.

== Speedway career ==
Bańbor rode for Lublin during the 2024 Polish speedway season.

In 2024, Bańbor came to prominence after receiving a wild card for the 2024 SGP2 (the World U21 Championship) and won the silver medal in the first race of three during the final series. Also in 2024, he helped Poland win the Under-21 Team World Championship in Manchester. He won a gold medal at the 2024 European Under 23 Team Speedway Championship. In October 2024, he helped Lublin win the Ekstraliga during the 2024 Polish speedway season.
