= Nazar Parnitskyi =

Ukrainian speedway rider

- Born: 13 October 2006 (age 20); Ukraine
- Nationality: Ukrainian

Career history

Poland
- 2023–2025: Leszno

Denmark
- 2025: SES

Sweden
- 2025: Dackarna

Speedway Grand Prix statistics
- SGP number: 785
- Starts: 10
- Finalist: 0 times
- Winner: 0 times

Individual honours
- 2024: European U19 champion
- 2024: World U21 Championship silver
- 2025: World U21 Championship gold

Nazar Parnitskyi (Polish: Nazar Parnicki, born 13 October 2006) is an international speedway rider from Ukraine.

== Speedway career ==
In 2023, Parnitskyi rode for Unia Leszno during the 2023 Polish speedway season and remained with the club for the 2024 season.

Parnitskyi represented the Ukraine national speedway team during the European Team Speedway Championship in both the 2023 and 2024.

In 2024, Parnitskyi came to prominence after completing a 15-point maximum when qualifying for the final series of the 2024 SGP2 (the World U21 Championship). He then won the Riga round of the SGP2 before claiming the silver medal.

Also in 2024, Parnitskyi made history as the first Ukrainian winner of a major speedway championship, becoming the European U19 champion after winning the gold medal at the U19 European Championship.

In 2026, Parnitskyi was named as the replacement for Tai Woffinden for the 2026 Speedway Grand Prix (world championship).
