= Bastian Pedersen =

Danish speedway rider

- Born: 28 April 2006 (age 20); Denmark
- Nationality: Danish

Career history

Denmark
- 2023–2025: Holsted

Poland
- 2023: Toruń
- 2025: Gniezno

Individual honours
- 2024: Danish U21 champion
- 2024: European U19 silver

Team honours
- 2024: European Team Championship silver

Bastian Pedersen (born 28 April 2006) is an international speedway rider from Denmark.

== Speedway career ==
In 2023, Pedersen rode for Holsted Tigers during the 2023 Danish speedway season and for KS Toruń (U24) during the 2023 Polish speedway season.

Pedersen came to prominence when he represented the Denmark national speedway team during the European Team Speedway Championship in 2024 and was part of the team that won the silver medal.

Also in 2024, Pedersen qualified for the final series of the 2024 SGP2 (the World U21 Championship) and won the bronze medal at the 2024 European Under 23 Team Speedway Championship. After winning the Danish U21 title, his season ended with him starring in the super final, when his team Holsted finished runner-up in the Danish Speedway League during the 2024 Danish speedway season. Pedersen won the silver medal at the 2024 U19 European Championship.

== Family ==
Pedersen is the son of former speedway rider Ronni Pedersen, and the nephew of three-time Individual Speedway World Champion Nicki Pedersen.
