= Sebastian Szostak =

Polish speedway rider

- Born: 17 September 2003 (age 23); Poland
- Nationality: Polish

Career history

Poland
- 2020–2025: Ostrów

Sweden
- 2024: Rospiggarna
- 2025: Indianerna
- 2026: Valsarna

Sebastian Szostak (born 17 September 2003) is an international speedway rider from Poland.

== Speedway career ==
In 2020, Szostak won the silver medal in the Bronze helmet during the 2020 Polish speedway season.

Szostak rode for Ostrów during the 2024 Polish speedway season after being attached to the club since 2020. He also rode for in the Rospiggarna the Swedish Speedway Team Championship.

In 2024, Szostak came to prominence after winning the qualifying round of the 2024 SGP2 (the World U21 Championship) at the Pista Olimpia Terenzano in Italy. He subsequently finished third in the first race of three in the final series. His season ended badly after a serious crash and suffering a spinal injury.
