= Vargarna =

Swedish speedway team

Club information
- Track address: Norrköping Motorstadion; Norrköping
- Country: Sweden
- Founded: 1947
- League: Elitserien

Club facts
- Track size: 271 metres

Major team honours
League Champions	1949, 1951, 1953, 1954, 1960, 1961
Second Division Champions	1964, 1981, 1983

Vargarna (lit. 'the Wolves') is a Swedish motorcycle speedway team based in Norrköping, Sweden, representing SMK Östgöta. The team race at Norrköping Motorstadion. They ride in the Elitserien and are six times champions of Sweden.

== History ==
=== 1948 to 1954 ===
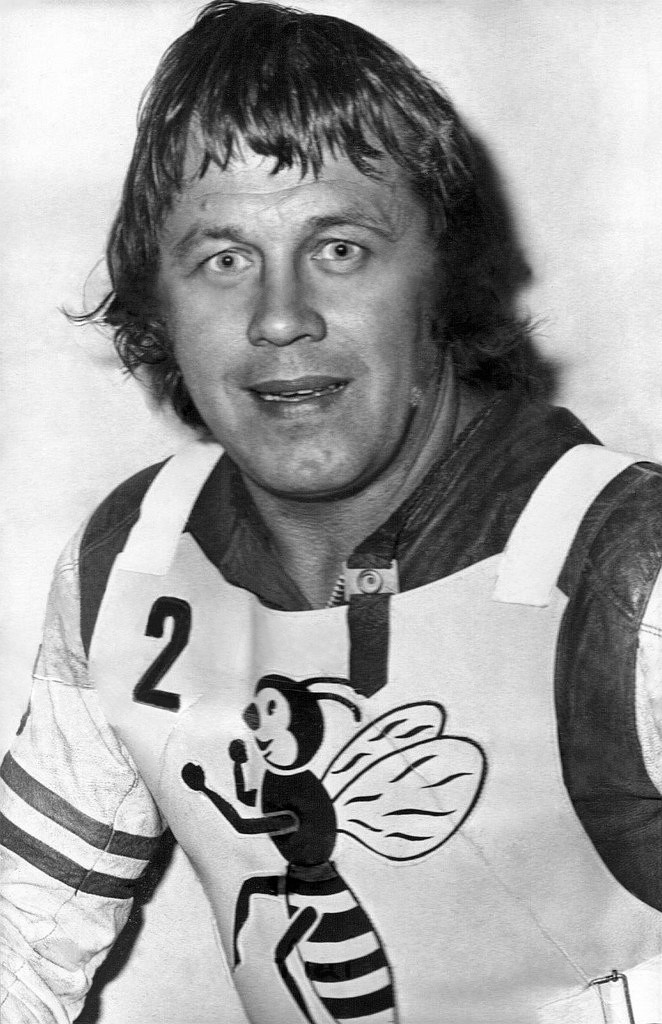
Olle Nygren, club legend

Vargarna was one of the seven inaugural members of the Swedish speedway league, which started during the 1948 Swedish speedway season. Their first significant riders were Olle Nygren and Helge Brinkeback, who would both become Swedish champions. Th eteam raced at the old Norrköping Motorstadion in Dagsbergsfältet (the site of the modern day Medley Centralbadet swimming complex).

Vargarna underwent a golden period, winning the Swedish Speedway Team Championship in the 1949 season, 1951, 1953 and 1954. A procession of top riders rode for the club and included Stig Pramberg, Dan Forsberg and Per-Olof Söderman.

=== 1957 to 1969 ===
After missing two seasons the club returned to the league in 1957 and they later won two more titles in 1960 and 1961, led by riders such as Nygren, Björn Knutson, Per-Tage Svensson, Joel Jansson and Sören Sjösten. The success could not be matched for the remainder of the 1960s but they did still compete at the top level. Vargarna left the Motorstadion in Dagsbergsfältet in 1963. Six years later in 1969, they moved into the new Norrköping Motorstadion at Kråkvilan.

=== 1970 to 1999 ===
Despite the best efforts of Sören Karlsson and Tommy Pettersson, the club spent the 1970s decade in the lower half of the division 1 and worse was to come during the next two decades, as the team moved up and down leagues from the Elitserien to the second tier of Swedish speedway.

=== 2000 to present ===
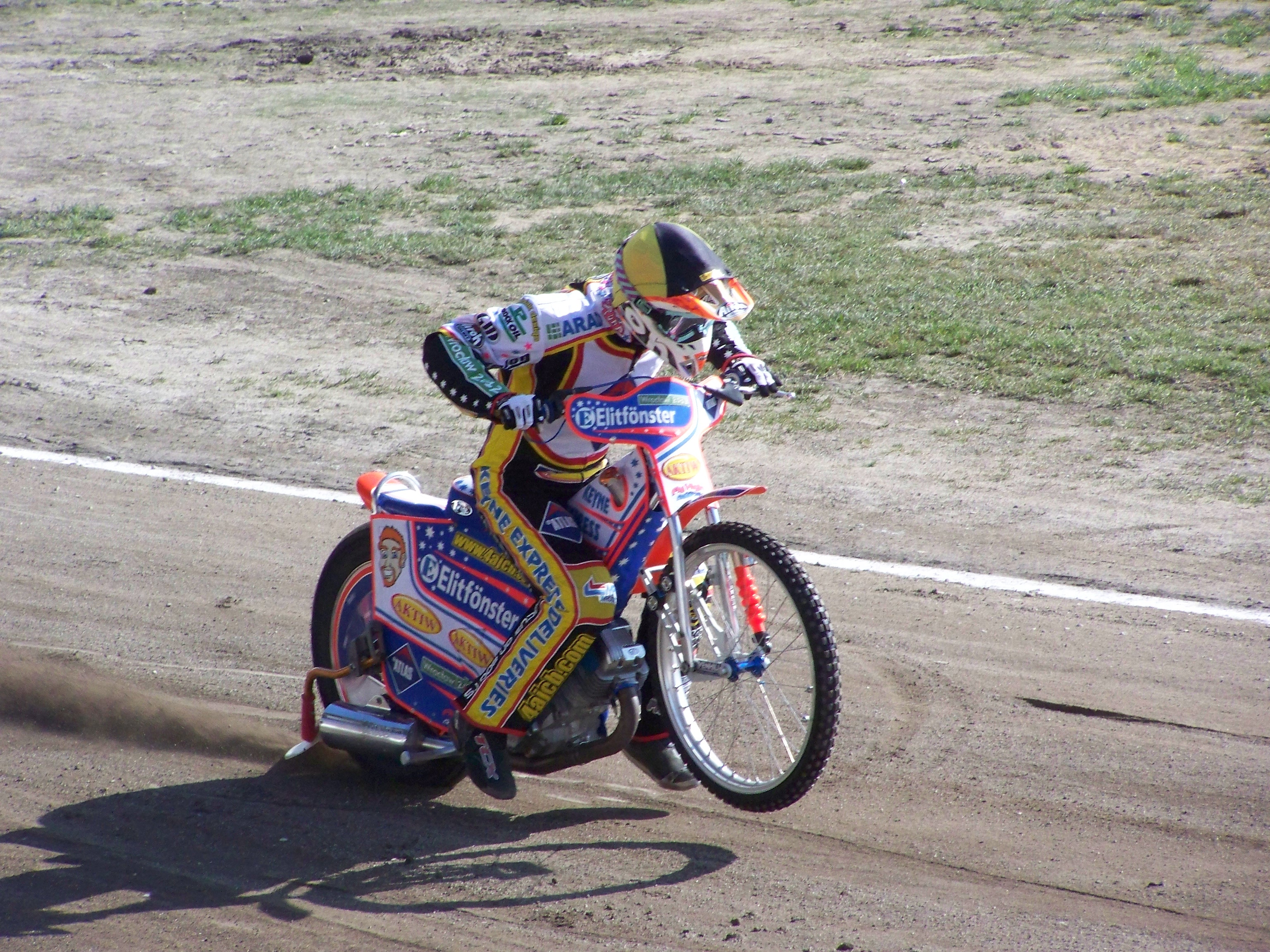
Jason Crump

The new millennium brought about a consolidation of form as the team remained in the Elitserien. A series of overseas riders were brought into the club, including Australian Jason Crump, but when Crump left, the team were relegated in 2006. A quick promotion back to the Elitserien ensued.

In 2010, the club signed former world champion Nicki Pedersen. He captained the side before leaving the club for Dackarna ahead of the 2014 season.

From 2015 to 2023, the team competed in the Allsvenskan and during the 2022 Swedish Speedway season the club reached the Allsvenskan play-off final.

They are scheduled to return to the Elitserien for 2024 Swedish speedway season.

== Riders and teams ==
=== Notable riders ===
- (Sweden) Helge Brinkeback
- (Australia) Jason Crump
- (Sweden) Dan Forsberg
- (Denmark) Erik Gundersen
- (Sweden) Torbjörn Harrysson
- (Sweden) Joel Jansson
- (Sweden) Sören Karlsson
- (Sweden) Björn Knutson
- (Sweden) Peter Nahlin
- (Sweden) Jimmy Nilsen
- (Sweden) Olle Nygren
- (Denmark) Nicki Pedersen
- (Sweden) Tommy Pettersson
- (Sweden) Stig Pramberg
- (Sweden) Sören Sjösten
- (Sweden) Per-Olof Söderman
- (Sweden) Per-Tage Svensson

=== Previous teams ===
Extended content

2014 team

- (Poland) Adrian Miedziński
- (Sweden) Anders Mellgren
- (Russia) Artem Laguta
- (Sweden) Daniel Davidsson
- (Slovenia) Martin Vaculík
- (Denmark) Peter Kildemand
- (Sweden) Ricky Kling
- (Poland) Tomasz Gapiński
- (Sweden) Pontus Aspgren

2016 team

- (Sweden) Denis Fagerkransz
- (Sweden) Viktor Ohlsson
- (Denmark) René Bach
- (Sweden) Daniel Davidsson
- (Sweden) Jonas Davidsson
- (Sweden) Robin Norman
- (Denmark) Nicklas Porsing
- (Sweden) Alex Johansson
- (Sweden) Sebastian Carlsson
- (Sweden) Oliver Berntzon
- (Sweden) Pontus Aspgren
- (Sweden) Kim Nilsson
- (Australia) Jason Doyle

2018 team

- (Sweden) Denis Fagerkransz
- (Sweden) Viktor Ohlsson
- (Germany) Erik Riss
- (Sweden) Joel Andersson
- (Sweden) Mathias Thörnblom
- (Sweden) Henrik Bergström
- (United Kingdom) Dan Bewley
- (Sweden) Oscar Holstedsom
- (Sweden) Viktor Bergström
- (Sweden) Anton Bork
- (Sweden) Kim Nilsson

2019 Team

- (Sweden) Dennis Fagerkransz
- (Sweden) Viktor Ohlsson
- (Finland) Timi Salonen
- (Sweden) Joel Andersson
- (Sweden) Mathias Thörnblom
- (Sweden) Henrik Bergström
- (Poland) Tomasz Gapiński
- (Sweden) Oscar Holstedsom
- (Sweden) Viktor Bergström
- (Sweden) Albin Born
- (Sweden) Anton Bork
- (Sweden) Kim Nilsson
- (Sweden) Billy Forsberg
- (Sweden) Daniel Davidsson

2022 team

- (Sweden) Filip Hjelmland
- (Sweden) Noel Wahlqvist
- (Poland) Mateusz Tonder
- (Denmark) William Drejer
- (Sweden) Daniel Henderson
- (Sweden) Oscar Holstensson
- (Poland) Patryk Rolnicki
- (Denmark) Bastian Borke
- (Poland) Mateusz Tudziez
- (Poland) Damian Pawliczak
- (Sweden) William Bjorling
- (Poland) Rafał Karczmarz
- (Germany) Marius Hillebrand
