= Damian Ratajczak =

Polish speedway rider (born 2005)

- Born: 23 May 2005 (age 21); Poland
- Nationality: Polish

Career history

Poland
- 2021–2024: Leszno

Denmark
- 2024: Grindsted
- 2025: Zielona Góra

Individual honours
- 2023: Silver Helmet silver
- 2023: World U21 silver

Team honours
- 2023: Team Junior European Champion

Damian Ratajczak (born 23 May 2005) is an international motorcycle speedway rider from Poland.

== Career ==
Ratajczak's breakthrough was in 2022, when he reached the final of the 2022 Individual Speedway Junior European Championship.

Ratajczak also won the silver medal in the Silver Helmet during the 2022 Polish speedway season.

In 2023, Ratajczak entered his second season with Unia Leszno and also qualified for the 2023 SGP2 (the world Under-21 Championship). He won the silver medal in the World U21 Championship and helped Poland win the 2023 Team Speedway Junior European Championship.

In 2024, Ratajczak broke his femur riding for Grindsted Speedway Klub during the 2024 Danish speedway season and required surgery.
