= Philip Hellström Bängs =

Swedish speedway rider

- Born: 24 March 2003 (age 23); Sweden
- Nationality: Swedish

Career history

Sweden
- 2020–2022, 2024–2025: Masarna
- 2023: Valsarna
- 2023–2025: Smederna

Poland
- 2023: Rzeszów
- 2024: Bydgoszcz
- 2025: Częstochowa

Denmark
- 2021: Region Varde

Individual honours
- 2024: Swedish U21 champion

Team honours
- 2024: U21 team world silver

Philip Hellström Bängs (born 24 March 2003) is an international speedway rider from Sweden.

== Speedway career ==
In 2021, Hellström Bängs helped Sweden qualify for the final of the 2021 Speedway of Nations (the World team Championships of speedway). He has made the Swedish Under 21 title podium in three successive years from 2020 to 2022.

Hellström Bängs helped Valsarna win the Allsvenskan during the 2022 Swedish Speedway season. He rode for Smederna in 2023 and 2024.

In 2024, Hellström Bängs qualified for the final series of the 2024 SGP2 (the World U21 Championship) and helped Sweden win the silver medal at the Under-21 Team World Championship in Manchester. Additionally, he became the Swedish U21 champion, denying two time champion Casper Henriksson a third consecutive title.
