= William Drejer =

Danish speedway rider (born 2005)

- Born: 18 December 2005 (age 20); Denmark
- Nationality: Danish

Career history

Denmark
- 2022–2025: Slangerup

Poland
- 2022–2023: Tarnów
- 2024: Wrocław
- 2025: Krosno

Sweden
- 2022–2023: Vargarna

Team honours
- 2024, 2025: Danish league champion

William Echardt Drejer (born 18 December 2005) is a motorcycle speedway rider from Denmark.

== Career ==
Drejer reached the final of the 2022 Individual Speedway Junior European Championship.

Drejer rides in the Danish Speedway League for Slangerup (2022 to 2024), in the Polish Ekstraliga for Tarnów (2022). and Vargarna in the Swedish Elitserien (2022).

In 2023, Drejer was named in the Danish squad by team manager Nicki Pedersen. In 2024, he qualified for the final series of the 2024 SGP2 (the World U21 Championship) and won the Nordic U19 title. Drejer helped Slangerup win the Danish Speedway League during the 2024 Danish speedway season.

In 2025, Drejer joined Cellfast Wilki Krosno, after being loaned from WTS Sparta Wrocław, to replace the injured Mathias Pollestad at the time, in the U24 position. During the 2025 Danish speedway season, he helped Slangerup retain the Speedway Ligaen title
