= Patryk Wojdyło =

Polish motorcycle speedway rider

- Born: 15 March 1999 (age 27); Jarosław, Poland
- Nationality: Polish

Career history

Poland
- 2016–2017: Rzeszów
- 2018–2019: Wrocław
- 2019: Opole
- 2020–2021, 2024: Krosno
- 2022: Rybnik
- 2025: Łódź

Great Britain
- 2023: Peterborough
- 2024: King's Lynn

Sweden
- 2023–2024: Smederna
- 2025: Västervik

Denmark
- 2021–2022: Fjelsted
- 2025: Grindsted

Individual honours
- 2023, 2024: Argentine Open champion

Patryk Wojdyło (born 15 March 1999) is a motorcycle speedway rider from Poland.

== Career ==
Wojdyło started riding for Rzeszów in the 1.Liga of the Team Speedway Polish Championship, during the 2016 Polish speedway season. In 2018, he reached the final of the 2018 Individual Speedway Junior European Championship. He then rode for Wrocław in the Ekstraliga in 2018 and 2019, before moving on to Opole, Krosno and Rybnik respectively. He also rode for Smederna in Sweden and Fjelsted in Denmark.

Wojdyło's biggest victory to date was when he won the Argentine International Championship in 2023. Later in July 2023, he signed for Peterborough Panthers in the British leagues and made his British debut during the SGB Premiership 2023.

Wojdyło signed for the King's Lynn Stars for the 2024 season. In February 2024, he successfully defended his Argentine Open crown.
