= Filip Hjelmland =

Swedish speedway rider

- Born: 10 September 1998 (age 28); Sweden
- Nationality: Swedish

Career history

Sweden
- 2019–2021, 2023–2025: Vetlanda/Njudungarna
- 2022, 2025: Vargarna
- 2022–2024: Dackarna

Poland
- 2018–2020: Gorzów
- 2020: Poznań
- 2022: Ostrów
- 2023–2024: Opole
- 2025: Daugavpils

Denmark
- 2018: Slangerup
- 2021: Nordjysk

Individual honours
- 2017: European U19 Championship silver

Team honours
- 2023: Swedish Eliserien champion

Filip Hjelmland (born 10 September 1998) is a speedway rider from Sweden.

== Speedway career ==
Hjelmland started riding at the age of 15 and came to prominence in 2017, when he won a silver medal at the European U19 Championship.

Hjelmland became a regular member of the Sweden national under-21 speedway team and helped them win a bronze medal at the 2019 Team Junior European Championship final. He was then called up to the Sweden national speedway team and represented them in the 2019 Speedway of Nations.

In 2022, Hjelmland rode for Dackarna in the Swedish Eliserien and Ostrów in the Ekstrasliga (the highest leagues in Sweden and Poland).
