= Joel Andersson (speedway rider) =

Swedish speedway rider

- Born: 10 April 1996 (age 30); Hardemo, Sweden
- Nationality: Swedish

Career history

Sweden
- 2015, 2020–2021: Indianerna
- 2018–2019: Vargarna
- 2022: Örnarna
- 2022–2025: Smederna
- 2024: Solkatterna
- 2025: Masarna

Great Britain
- 2018–2019: Edinburgh

Poland
- 2016: Opole
- 2018: Wanda Kraków

Speedway Grand Prix statistics
- Starts: 1

Individual honours
- 2016: Swedish U21 champion

Team honours
- 2015: Team Junior European Championship silver

Joel Andersson (born 10 April 1996) is an international speedway rider from Sweden.

== Speedway career ==
Andersson came to prominence at the 2015 Team Speedway Junior European Championship, where he won a silver medal and top scored for Sweden.

The following year, Andersson won the 2016 Swedish U21 championship, finished fourth in the 2016 Individual Speedway Junior European Championship and the 2016 Team Speedway Junior European Championship and reached the 2016 Speedway Under-21 World Championship final. He started his British speedway career in 208 when he signed for the Edinburgh Monarchs for the SGB Championship 2018, he stayed with the Scottish club for the following season in the SGB Championship 2019.

In 2019, Andersson represented Sweden in the final of the 2019 Team Long Track World Championship and in 2021, he made an appearance in the 2021 Speedway Grand Prix

In 2022, Andersson competed in the 2022 European Pairs Speedway Championship for Sweden and also in 2022, he helped Smederna win the Swedish Speedway Team Championship during the 2022 campaign.
