= Mathias Thörnblom =

Swedish motorcycle speedway rider

- Born: 14 July 1992 (age 34); Malmö, Sweden
- Nationality: Swedish

Career history

Sweden
- 2011–2015: Gnistorna
- 2012–2013: Indianerna
- 2014: Västervik
- 2015–2022: Lejonen
- 2016–2017: Örnarna
- 2018–2019, 2021: Vargarna
- 2022: Smålänningarna
- 2024–2025: Piraterna
- 2024: Gislaved
- 2025: Njudungarna

Great Britain
- 2015: Berwick

Poland
- 2011: Kraków
- 2012: Rybnik
- 2013: Gdańsk
- 2015: Lublin
- 2016, 2022–2025: Opole
- 2020: Krosno

Denmark
- 2010: Vojens
- 2011–2012: Grindsted
- 2014–2015: Munkebo

Mathias Thörnblom (born 14 July 1992 in Malmö) is a Swedish motorcycle speedway rider.

== Career ==
Thörnblom made his British leagues debut in 2012 when he rode for Coventry Bees, although he only rode one match for the club. He reached the final of the 2013 Individual Speedway Junior European Championship. and was a reserve rider at the 2013 Speedway Grand Prix.

Thörnblom would return to Britain in 2015 when he rode for the Berwick Bandits during the 2015 Premier League speedway season.

In 2022, Thörnblom finished fourth at the 2022 European Pairs Speedway Championship and rode in the Polish leagues for Opole.

In 2023, Thörnblom left Dackarna and joined Piraterna in the Elitserien.
