= Anton Karlsson (speedway rider) =

Swedish speedway rider

- Born: 20 July 2000 (age 26); Västervik, Sweden
- Nationality: Swedish

Career history

Sweden
- 2019-2023: Griparna
- 2017–2025: Västervik
- 2024–2025: Njudungarna

Poland
- 2022-2024: Częstochowa

Team honours
- 2025: Swedish champions

Anton Karlsson (born 20 July 2000) is a speedway rider from Sweden.

== Speedway career ==
Karlsson came to prominence in 2018, when he won the silver medal at the Swedish Under 21 Championship. He also helped Sweden reach the final of the 2018 Team Speedway Junior World Championship. The following year in 2019, he won a bronze at the Swedish U21 event. Karlsson also competed for Sweden in the finals of the 2018 and 2020 Team Junior European Championship.

In 2022, for the third time, Karlsson helped Sweden reach the final of the 2022 Team Speedway Junior European Championship, recording a fourth-place finish and also in 2022 he rode for Griparna in the Swedish Allsvenskan.

In 2023 and 2024, Karlsson signed for Västervik in the Swedish Eliserien (the highest league in Sweden). In 2025 he helped Västervik win the Elitserien.
