= Jonatan Grahn =

Swedish speedway rider

- Born: 15 October 2000 (age 26); Sweden
- Nationality: Swedish

Career history

Sweden
- 2018, 2020–2025: Indianerna
- 2024: Solkatterna
- 2025: Örnarna

Great Britain
- 2025: Edinburgh

Jonatan Grahn (born 15 October 2000) is a speedway rider from Sweden.

== Speedway career ==
Grahn came to prominence in 2020, when he reached the final and finished fifth in the 2020 Individual Speedway Junior European Championship. The following year in 2021, he represented Sweden in the Team Speedway Junior World Championship final.

In 2022, Grahn recorded a fourth place finish in Team Junior European Championship and rode for Indianerna in the Swedish Eliserien (the highest league in Sweden). He continued to ride for Indianerna for both the 2023 and 2024 seasons. He was selected by the Sweden national speedway team to represent them for the 2024 season.

Grahn signed for Edinburgh Monarchs for his debut season in British speedway for the SGB Championship 2025.

== Family ==
Grahn's younger brother Gustav is also a professional speedway rider.
