= Daniel Henderson =

Swedish speedway rider

- Born: 4 August 1991 (age 35); Sweden
- Nationality: Swedish

Career history

Sweden
- 2011–2012, 2015–2016: Smederna
- 2017: Piraterna
- 2018: Västervik
- 2019, 2023: Lejonen
- 2013, 2020–2022: Rospiggarna
- 2014: Hammarby
- 2023, 2025: Vargarna
- 2024: Örnarna

Poland
- 2023: Piła

Daniel Henderson (born 4 August 1991) is a motorcycle speedway and Ice speedway rider from Sweden.

== Speedway career ==
In 2021, Henderson suffered serious injuries in a crash, which resulted in 12 broken ribs and a spine injury and was close to announcing his retirement. However, he returned to speedway when riding for Rospiggarna in his native Sweden.

Henderson has reached every Swedish Individual Speedway Championship final from 2018 to 2022, and finished fifth in the 2020 Swedish Individual Speedway Championship.

In 2023, Henderson signed for Vargarna in the Swedish Allsvenskan and made his Polish debut in 2023 after signing for Polonia Piła.

== Family ==
His uncle Kenny Olsson died in a speedway crash in 2007.
