= Casper Henriksson =

Swedish speedway rider

- Born: 3 April 2004 (age 22); Sweden
- Nationality: Swedish

Career history

Sweden
- 2020–2025: Lejonen
- 2022: Smålänningarna
- 2025: Örnarna

Poland
- 2022-2023: Toruń U24
- 2023: Opole
- 2024–2025: Gniezno

Individual honours
- 2022, 2023: Swedish U21 champion
- 2022: European Junior Championship bronze

Team honours
- 2024: U21 team world silver
- 2024: Swedish champions

Casper Henriksson (born 3 April 2004) is a speedway rider from Sweden.

== Speedway career ==
Henriksson became the Swedish Under 21 champion in 2022. He represented Sweden at senior level in the 2022 Speedway of Nations 2 final. Also in 2022, he finished 14th in the final standings of the 2022 SGP2 and won a European Junior bronze medal at the 2022 Individual Speedway Junior European Championship.

From 2020 to 2024, Henriksson was riding for Lejonen in Sweden. In 2023, he successfully defended his Swedish U21 title.

In 2024, Henriksson qualified for the final series of the 2024 SGP2 (the World U21 Championship). Also in 2024, he helped Sweden win the silver medal at the Under-21 Team World Championship in Manchester, and helped Lejonen win the Elitserien during the 2024 Swedish speedway season.
