= Mathias Pollestad =

Norwegian motorcycle speedway rider

- Born: 21 November 2004 (age 22); Norway
- Nationality: Norwegian

Career history

Norway
- 2020: Riska MSK

Poland
- 2022–2023: Gorzów
- 2025: Krosno

Sweden
- 2023: Njudungarna
- 2024: Indianerna
- 2025: Smederna

Denmark
- 2024–2025: Grindsted

Individual honours
- 2020: Norwegian champion
- 2024: World U21 bronze
- 2022: European Junior Championship silver

Mathias Pollestad (born 21 November 2004) is a speedway rider from Norway. He is a Norwegian national champion.

== Speedway career ==
In 2020, Pollestad won the Norwegian Individual Speedway Championship.

In 2022, Pollestad won the silver medal at the European Junior Championship.

In 2024, Pollestad qualified for the final series of the 2024 SGP2 (the World U21 Championship) and secured the bronze medal.
