= 2026 Speedway Grand Prix =

32nd season of Speedway Grand Pix

Season details
- Dates: 2 May – 26 September
- Events: 10
- Cities: 9
- Countries: 7
- Riders: 15 permanents 1 wild card(s); 2 track reserves
- Heats: 230 (in 10 events)

Winners
- Champion: GBR Robert Lambert
- Runner-up: POL Bartosz Zmarzlik
- 3rd place: AUS Brady Kurtz

The 2026 Speedway Grand Prix season was the 32nd season of the Speedway Grand Prix era, and decided the 81st FIM Speedway World Championship. It was the first series promoted by Mayfield Sports Events Ltd, who took over from Discovery.

Bartosz Zmarzlik was the defending champion having won the title in 2025. A win would have meant he surpassesed Tony Rickardsson and Ivan Mauger's record of six world championships.. However, Zmarzlik fell two points short as Robert Lambert won three of the last four rounds of the series to be crowned world champion for the first time. Brady Kurtz completed the podium.

== Qualification ==
For the 2026 season there were 15 permanent riders, who were joined at each Grand Prix by one wild card and two track reserves. The top seven riders from the 2025 championship qualified automatically. These riders were joined by the four riders who qualified via the Grand Prix Challenge and the 2025 Speedway European Championship winner. The final three riders Tai Woffinden, Max Fricke and Jason Doyle were nominated by the SGP Commission. In March 2026, Nazar Parnitskyi was named as the replacement for Tai Woffinden following the latter's withdrawal.

=== Qualified riders ===
#	Riders	2025 place	GP Ch place	2025 SEC place	Permanent rider appearance	Previous appearances in series
95	(Poland) Bartosz Zmarzlik	1	—	—	11th	2012–2015, 2016–2025
101	(Australia) Brady Kurtz	2	—	—	2nd	2016-2017, 2025
99	(United Kingdom) Dan Bewley	3	—	—	5th	2018, 2022–2025
66	(Sweden) Fredrik Lindgren	4	—	—	17th	2004, 2006–2007, 2008–2014, 2016, 2017–2025
25	(Australia) Jack Holder	5	—	—	5th	2016, 2020, 2022–2025
29	(Latvia) Andžejs Ļebedevs	6	4	2	3rd	2013–2014, 2022–2023, 2024-2025
505	(United Kingdom) Robert Lambert	7	—	—	6th	2015, 2018–2019, 2021–2025
415	(Poland) Dominik Kubera	12	1	—	3rd	2021, 2023, 2024-2025
223	(Poland) Kacper Woryna	—	2	4	1st	2016, 2022
30	(Denmark) Leon Madsen	17	3	3	7th	2010, 2013, 2019–2024, 2025
52	(Denmark) Michael Jepsen Jensen	18	5	6	2nd	2012-2014, 2015, 2016-2018, 2025
692	(Poland) Patryk Dudek	16	—	1	7th	2016, 2017–2020, 2022-2023, 2024-2025
46	(Australia) Max Fricke	8	—	—	6th	2016–2017, 2019, 2020–2023, 2024, 2025
69	(Australia) Jason Doyle	10	—	—	12th	2015–2025
785	(Ukraine) Nazar Parnitskyi	—	—	5	1st	–

=== Qualified substitutes ===
The following riders were nominated as substitutes:

#	Riders	2025 place	GP Ch place	2025 SEC place
105	(Denmark) Anders Thomsen	11	6	—
201	(Czech Republic) Jan Kvěch	13	9	22
744	(Germany) Kai Huckenbeck	15	14	13
999	(Norway) Mathias Pollestad	—	16	—

== Calendar ==
The 2026 season consisted of 10 events.

Round	Date	City and venue	Winner	Runner-up	3rd placed	4th placed	Results
1	2 May	(Germany) Landshut, Germany; Ellermühle Speedway Stadium	(Poland) Kacper Woryna	(United Kingdom) Dan Bewley	(Poland) Bartosz Zmarzlik	(United Kingdom) Robert Lambert	results
2	23 May	(Czech Republic) Prague, Czech Republic; Markéta Stadium	(Denmark) Leon Madsen	(Australia) Brady Kurtz	(Poland) Bartosz Zmarzlik	(Denmark) Michael Jepsen Jensen	results
3	5 June	(United Kingdom) Manchester, Great Britain; National Speedway Stadium	(Australia) Max Fricke	(Australia) Brady Kurtz	(Australia) Jack Holder	(Poland) Bartosz Zmarzlik	results
4	6 June	(United Kingdom) Manchester, Great Britain; National Speedway Stadium	(Australia) Brady Kurtz	(Denmark) Michael Jepsen Jensen	(Poland) Bartosz Zmarzlik	(Australia) Jack Holder	results
5	20 June	(Poland) Wrocław, Poland; Olympic Stadium	(Poland) Bartosz Zmarzlik	(United Kingdom) Robert Lambert	(Denmark) Michael Jepsen Jensen	(Australia) Brady Kurtz	results
6	11 July	(Sweden) Målilla, Sweden; Skrotfrag Arena	(Denmark) Anders Thomsen	(United Kingdom) Robert Lambert	(Poland) Bartosz Zmarzlik	(Australia) Brady Kurtz	results
7	1 August	(Poland) Łódź, Poland; Moto Arena Łódź	(United Kingdom) Robert Lambert	(Poland) Patryk Dudek	(Australia) Brady Kurtz	(Denmark) Michael Jepsen Jensen	results
8	8 August	(Latvia) Riga, Latvia; Riga Speedway Stadium	(Poland) Bartosz Zmarzlik	(United Kingdom) Robert Lambert	(Australia) Brady Kurtz	(Poland) Kacper Woryna	results
9	12 September	(Denmark) Vojens, Denmark; Vojens Speedway Center	(United Kingdom) Robert Lambert	(Denmark) Leon Madsen	(Australia) Max Fricke	(Denmark) Michael Jepsen Jensen	results
10	26 September	(Poland) Toruń, Poland; MotoArena Toruń	(United Kingdom) Robert Lambert	(Australia) Brady Kurtz	(Poland) Bartosz Zmarzlik	(Poland) Patryk Dudek	results

== Final classification ==
Qualifies for next season's Grand Prix series
Full-time Grand Prix rider
Wild card, track reserve or qualified reserve

Pos.	Rider	Points	GER (Germany)	CZE (Czech Republic)	GBR (United Kingdom)	GBR (United Kingdom)	POL (Poland)	SWE (Sweden)	POL (Poland)	LAT (Latvia)	DEN (Denmark)	POL (Poland)
Gold	(United Kingdom) (505) Robert Lambert (C)	162	14	6	15	7	21	18	20	18	23	20
Silver	(Poland) (95) Bartosz Zmarzlik	160	16	16	14	16	20	16	11	20	12	19
Bronze	(Australia) (101) Brady Kurtz	157	8	18	19	20	14	14	16	16	14	18
4	(Denmark) (52) Michael Jepsen Jensen	111	2	14	11	18	16	5	14	8	14	9
5	(Poland) (692) Patryk Dudek	103	10	5	9	5	11	11	18	12	8	14
6	(Denmark) (30) Leon Madsen	100	1	20	8	6	10	10	10	7	18	10
7	(Australia) (46) Max Fricke	97	3	7	20	12	8	4	8	9	18	8
8	(Poland) (223) Kacper Woryna	95	20	11	4	9	5	6	9	14	11	6
9	(Australia) (69) Jason Doyle	73	11	8	7	11	2	3	7	10	7	7
10	(Latvia) (29) Andžejs Ļebedevs	67	5	9	6	3	9	12	5	11	5	2
11	(Denmark) (105) Anders Thomsen	62	–	4	10	4	12	20	4	1	3	4
12	(Australia) (25) Jack Holder	55	9	12	20	14	0	–	–	–	–	–
13	(Czech Republic) (201) Jan Kvěch	52	–	3	5	10	9	7	12	6	–	–
14	(Poland) (415) Dominik Kubera	44	7	10	–	–	3	8	3	–	4	9
15	(Sweden) (66) Fredrik Lindgren	36	12	–	–	–	–	–	–	4	9	11
16	(United Kingdom) (99) Dan Bewley	31	18	–	–	–	–	–	–	–	0	13
17	(Ukraine) (755) Nazar Parnitskyi	24	6	2	1	1	4	2	1	3	1	3
18	(Germany) (744) Kai Huckenbeck	18	–	–	2	8	–	1	2	5	–	–
19	(Poland) (16) Maciej Janowski	11	–	–	–	–	11	–	–	–	–	–
20	(Sweden) (16) Kim Nilsson	9	–	–	–	–	–	9	–	–	–	–
21	(Denmark) (16) Frederik Jakobsen	7	–	–	–	–	–	–	–	–	7	–
22	(United Kingdom) (16) Tom Brennan	7	–	–	5	2	–	–	–	–	–	–
23	(Poland) (16) Piotr Pawlicki	6	–	–	–	–	–	–	6	–	–	–
24	(Germany) (16) Norick Blödorn	4	4	–	–	–	–	–	–	–	–	–
25	(Poland) (16) Maksymilian Pawełczak	3	–	–	–	–	–	–	–	–	–	3
26	(Latvia) (16) Daniils Kolodinskis	2	–	–	–	–	–	–	–	2	–	–
27	(Denmark) (17) Mikkel Andersen	2	–	–	–	–	–	–	–	–	2	–
28	(Czech Republic) (16) Adam Bednář	1	–	1	–	–	–	–	–	–	–	–
29	(Poland) (18) Marcel Kowolik	1	–	–	–	–	1	–	–	–	–	–
30	(Germany) (17) Kevin Wölbert	0	0	–	–	–	–	–	–	–	–	–
31	(Poland) (17) Nikodem Mikołajczyk	0	–	–	–	–	0	–	–	–	–	–
32	(Denmark) (18) Nicolai Heiselberg	0	–	–	–	–	–	–	–	–	0	–
Pos.	Rider	Points	GER (Germany)	CZE (Czech Republic)	GBR (United Kingdom)	GBR (United Kingdom)	POL (Poland)	SWE (Sweden)	POL (Poland)	LAT (Latvia)	DEN (Denmark)	POL (Poland)

== By league ==
Among the 15 permanent riders:

- 15 participate in the Polish league
- 10 in the Swedish league
- 6 in the British league
- 4 in the Danish league

(club/league participation as of October 2025)
