= 2025 Speedway Grand Prix of Latvia =

Speedway Grand Prix event

- Venue: Biķernieki Speedway Stadium
- Location: Riga (Latvia)
- Start date: 2 August 2025
- Competitors: 16 (2 reserves)

The 2025 FIM Speedway Grand Prix of Latvia was the eighth round of the 2025 Speedway Grand Prix season (the World Championship of speedway). It took place on 2 August at the Biķernieki Speedway Stadium in Riga, Latvia. It was the 11th time that the Speedway Grand Prix of Latvia was held.

The event was won by Brady Kurtz (his 3rd career Grand Prix win and 3rd consecutive win).

== Result ==
Placing	Rider	1	2	3	4	5	6	7	8	9	10	11	12	13	14	15	16	17	18	19	20	Pts	SF1	SF2	Final	GP Pts
1	(Australia) (14) Brady Kurtz				0		2					3		2							3	10		3	3	20
2	(Sweden) (7) Freddie Lindgren		1					0					3	3					3			10	3		2	18
3	(Latvia) (10) Andžejs Ļebedevs			3			0						2			3		3				11			1	16
4	(Poland) (15) Bartosz Zmarzlik				1			3			3						3	2				12			0	14
5	(Australia) (8) Jack Holder		3						1			1			3			1				9		2		12
6	(United Kingdom) (13) Dan Bewley				3	2							1		2					1		9	2			11
7	(United Kingdom) (6) Robert Lambert		2				3			2							0			3		10		1		10
8	(Denmark) (16) Anders Thomsen				2				3	1						2			2			10	1			9
9	(Australia) (4) Max Fricke	3							2				0				1				2	8	0			8
10	(Poland) (9) Dominik Kubera			0		3						2					2		0			7		0		7
11	(Australia) (1) Jason Doyle	2				1				3				1				0				7				6
12	(Latvia) (2) Jevgeņijs Kostigovs	1					1				2				0				1			5				5
13	(Denmark) (11) Mikkel Michelsen			2				1		0					1						1	5				4
14	(Czech Republic) (3) Jan Kvěch	0						2				0				0				2		4				3
15	(Slovakia) (5) Martin Vaculík		0			0					1					1					0	2				2
16	(Germany) (12) Kai Huckenbeck			1					0		0			0						0		1				1
R1	(Latvia) (R1) Francis Gusts																					0	R1			
R2	(Latvia) (R2) Oļegs Mihailovs																					0	R2			

m - exclusion for exceeding two minute time allowance • t - exclusion for touching the tapes • x - other exclusion • e - retired or mechanical failure • f - fell • ns - non-starter • nc - non-classify

gate A - inside	gate B	gate C	gate D - outside
