= 2025 Speedway Grand Prix of Denmark =

Speedway Grand Prix event

- Venue: Vojens Speedway Center
- Location: Vojens (Denmark)
- Start date: 13 September 2025
- Competitors: 16 (2 reserves)

The 2025 FIM Speedway Grand Prix of Denmark was the tenth and final round of the 2025 Speedway Grand Prix season (the World Championship of speedway). It took place on 13 September at the Vojens Speedway Center in Vojens, Denmark. It was the 30th time that the Speedway Grand Prix of Denmark had been held.

The event was won by Brady Kurtz who set a new record of winning fve consecutive Grand Prix races.

However, the defending champion Bartosz Zmarzlik secured the Speedway World Championship by beating Kurtz in the overall table by just one point. He also equalled the achievements of Tony Rickardsson and Ivan Mauger by winning his sixth world title.

== Grand Prix result ==
Placing	Rider	1	2	3	4	5	6	7	8	9	10	11	12	13	14	15	16	17	18	19	20	Pts	SF1	SF2	Final	GP Pts
1	(Australia) (15) Brady Kurtz				2			3			3						3	1				12			3	20
2	(Poland) (9) Bartosz Zmarzlik			3		3						3					2		2			13			2	18
3	(Denmark) (2) Michael Jepsen Jensen	0					0				2				3				3			8	3		1	16
4	(United Kingdom) (13) Dan Bewley				3	2							2		2					0		9		3	0	14
5	(Latvia) (8) Andžejs Ļebedevs		3						3			2			1			3				12	2			12
6	(Sweden) (10) Freddie Lindgren			2			3						0			3		2				10		2		11
7	(United Kingdom) (16) Robert Lambert				1				2	3						2			0			8	1			10
8	(Australia) (3) Jason Doyle	1						2				1				1				2		7		1		9
9	(Denmark) (14) Mikkel Michelsen				0		2					0		3							3	8		0		8
10	(Slovakia) (4) Martin Vaculík	3							1				3				0				0	7	0			7
11	(Australia) (11) Jack Holder			1				1		2					0						2	6				6
12	(Germany) (12) Kai Huckenbeck			0					t		0			2						3		5				5
13	(Australia) (6) Max Fricke		1				1			1							1			1		5				4
14	(Denmark) (5) Anders Thomsen		2			0					1					0					1	4				3
15	(Poland) (1) Dominik Kubera	2				1				0				0				0				3				2
16	(Czech Republic) (7) Jan Kvěch		0					0					1	1					1			3				1
R1	(Denmark) (R1) Jonas Knudsen								0													0	R1			
R2	(Denmark) (R2) William Drejer																					0	R2			

m - exclusion for exceeding two minute time allowance • t - exclusion for touching the tapes • x - other exclusion • e - retired or mechanical failure • f - fell • ns - non-starter • nc - non-classify

gate A - inside	gate B	gate C	gate D - outside
