= 2025 Speedway Grand Prix of Great Britain =

Speedway Grand Prix event

2025 Speedway Grand Prix of Great Britain I and II
- Venue: National Speedway Stadium
- Location: Manchester, England
- Start date: 13 June; 14 June
- Competitors: 16 (2 reserves)

The 2025 FIM Speedway Grand Prix of Great Britain were the fourth and fifth rounds of the 2025 Speedway Grand Prix season (the World Championship). They took place on 13 and 14 June at the National Speedway Stadium in Manchester, England.

The rounds were the 29th and 30th Speedway Grand Prix of Great Britain respectively.

The fourth round (first event) was won by Dan Bewley (his fifth career Grand Prix win) on his home track and Bartosz Zmarzlik won the fifth round (second event) to record his 29th career victory.

== Results ==
=== Event 1 - (13 June) ===
==== Sprint result ====
Pos	Rider	GP Points
1	(Australia) Max Fricke	4
2	(Australia) Brady Kurtz	3
3	(Poland) Bartosz Zmarzlik	2
4	(Slovakia) Martin Vaculík	1

==== Main round ====
Placing	Rider	1	2	3	4	5	6	7	8	9	10	11	12	13	14	15	16	17	18	19	20	Pts	SF1	SF2	Final	GP Pts
1	(United Kingdom) (10) Dan Bewley			1			2						3			2		3				11		3	3	20
2	(Poland) (5) Bartosz Zmarzlik		3			1					2					3					3	12			2	18
3	(Australia) (12) Brady Kurtz			2					3		3			1						3		12			1	16
4	(Sweden) (3) Freddie Lindgren	2						3				0				1				2		8	3		0	14
5	(Australia) (9) Jack Holder			0		3						2					3		3			11		2		12
6	(United Kingdom) (8) Robert Lambert		2						2			1			0			2				7	2			11
7	(Slovakia) (2) Martin Vaculík	3					1				1				3				2			10	1			10
8	(Denmark) (11) Mikkel Michelsen			3				2		2					1						0	8		1		9
9	(Australia) (14) Max Fricke				2		3					3		3							1	12	0			8
10	(Czech Republic) (15) Jan Kvěch				3			1			0						2	0				6		0		7
11	(United Kingdom) (6) Charles Wright		0				0			3							1			1		5				6
12	(Germany) (4) Kai Huckenbeck	1							0				2				0				2	5				5
13	(Poland) (1) Dominik Kubera	0				2				0				2				1				5				4
14	(Australia) (13) Jason Doyle				1	0							1		2					0		4				3
15	(Denmark) (16) Anders Thomsen				0				1	1						0			1			3				2
16	(Latvia) (7) Andžejs Ļebedevs		1					0					0	0					0			1				1
R1	(United Kingdom) (R1) Chris Harris																					0	R1			
R2	(United Kingdom) (R2) Adam Ellis																					0	R2			

m - exclusion for exceeding two minute time allowance • t - exclusion for touching the tapes • x - other exclusion • e - retired or mechanical failure • f - fell • ns - non-starter • nc - non-classify

gate A - inside	gate B	gate C	gate D - outside

=== Event 2 - (14 June) ===
Placing	Rider	1	2	3	4	5	6	7	8	9	10	11	12	13	14	15	16	17	18	19	20	Pts	SF1	SF2	Final	GP Pts
1	(Poland) (11) Bartosz Zmarzlik			3				3		3					3						1	13			3	20
2	(Australia) (5) Brady Kurtz		3			3					2					0					3	11			2	18
3	(Sweden) (3) Freddie Lindgren	2						2				2				3				1		10		3	1	16
4	(Australia) (7) Jack Holder		2					1					1	3					2			9	3		0	14
5	(Australia) (9) Max Fricke			1		2						3					3		0			9		2		12
6	(Slovakia) (4) Martin Vaculík	0							3				3				1				0	7	2			11
7	(Germany) (10) Kai Huckenbeck			2			3						2			2		2				11	1			10
8	(Denmark) (6) Mikkel Michelsen		1				1			2							2			3		9		1		9
9	(Poland) (13) Dominik Kubera				3	1							0		2					0		6	0			8
10	(United Kingdom) (8) Dan Bewley		0						2			1			0			3				6		0		7
11	(Denmark) (16) Anders Thomsen				2				0	0						1			3			6				6
12	(United Kingdom) (2) Robert Lambert	1					0				3				1				1			6				5
13	(Latvia) (14) Andžejs Ļebedevs				0		2					0		2							2	6				4
14	(Czech Republic) (1) Jan Kvěch	3				0				1				1				0				5				3
15	(Australia) (12) Jason Doyle			0					1		0			0						2		3				2
16	(United Kingdom) (15) Charles Wright				1			0			1						0	1				3				1
R1	(United Kingdom) (R1) Chris Harris																					0	R1			
R2	(United Kingdom) (R2) Adam Ellis																					0	R2			

m - exclusion for exceeding two minute time allowance • t - exclusion for touching the tapes • x - other exclusion • e - retired or mechanical failure • f - fell • ns - non-starter • nc - non-classify

gate A - inside	gate B	gate C	gate D - outside
