= 2025 Speedway Grand Prix of Germany =

Speedway Grand Prix event

- Venue: Ellermühle Speedway Stadium
- Location: Landshut
- Start date: 3 May 2025
- Competitors: 16 (2 reserves)

The 2025 WWK FIM Speedway Grand Prix of Germany was the opening race of the 2025 Speedway Grand Prix season. It took place on 3 May at the Ellermühle Speedway Stadium, known as the OneSolar Arena for sponsorship purposes, in Landshut, Germany. It was the 15th Speedway Grand Prix of Germany.

The event was won by defending champion Bartosz Zmarzlik, who won his 27th career Grand Prix.

== Results ==
=== Sprint result ===
Pos	Rider	GP Points
1	(Poland) Bartosz Zmarzlik	4
2	(Australia) Brady Kurtz	3
3	(United Kingdom) Robert Lambert	2
4	(Latvia) Andžejs Ļebedevs	1

=== Main round ===
Placing	Rider	1	2	3	4	5	6	7	8	9	10	11	12	13	14	15	16	17	18	19	20	Pts	SF1	SF2	Final	GP Pts
1	(Poland) (3) Bartosz Zmarzlik	3						1				3				3				3		13			3	20
2	(United Kingdom) (1) Dan Bewley	2				0				2				3				2				9		3	2	18
3	(Latvia) (9) Andžejs Ļebedevs			2		1						1					3		3			10	3		1	16
4	(Australia) (13) Brady Kurtz				3	3							3		2					2		13			0	14
5	(Sweden) (4) Freddie Lindgren	0							2				2				2				2	8	2			12
6	(Poland) (6) Dominik Kubera		1				2			3							0			1		7		2		11
7	(United Kingdom) (5) Robert Lambert		2			2					3					0					1	8		1		10
8	(Australia) (14) Max Fricke				1		3					0		1							3	8	1			9
9	(Australia) (10) Jack Holder			3			1						1			2		1				8	0			8
10	(Denmark) (8) Anders Thomsen		3						3			2			1			0				9		0		7
11	(Slovakia) (15) Martin Vaculík				2			0			1						1	3				7				6
12	(Czech Republic) (2) Jan Kvěch	1					0				f				3				2			6				5
13	(Denmark) (11) Mikkel Michelsen			1				3		0					x						e	4				4
14	(Australia) (7) Jason Doyle		0					2					0	2					x			4				3
15	(Germany) (16) Erik Riss				0				1	1						1			1			4				2
16	(Germany) (12) Kai Huckenbeck			0					0		2			0						0		2				1
R1	(Germany) (R1) Kevin Wölbert																					0	R1			
R2	(Germany) (R2) Valentin Grobauer																					0	R2			

m - exclusion for exceeding two minute time allowance • t - exclusion for touching the tapes • x - other exclusion • e - retired or mechanical failure • f - fell • ns - non-starter • nc - non-classify

gate A - inside	gate B	gate C	gate D - outside
