= 2025 Speedway Grand Prix of Czech Republic =

Speedway Grand Prix event

- Venue: Markéta Stadium
- Location: Prague (Czech Republic)
- Start date: 31 May 2025
- Competitors: 16 (2 reserves)

The 2025 FIM Speedway Grand Prix of Czech Republic was the third round of the 2025 Speedway Grand Prix season. It took place on 31 May 2025 at the Markéta Stadium in Prague, Czech Republic. It was the 31st Speedway Grand Prix of Czech Republic.

Jason Doyle was forced to withdraw through injury and was replaced by Leon Madsen and Adam Bednář was due to make his GP debut but was replaced by Daniel Klíma. Martin Vaculík attempted to win the event for the fourth consecutive year but it was Bartosz Zmarzlik in his 100th Grand Prix who won his 28th career Grand Prix.

== Grand Prix result ==
| Placing | Rider | 1 | 2 | 3 | 4 | 5 | 6 | 7 | 8 | 9 | 10 | 11 | 12 | 13 | 14 | 15 | 16 | 17 | 18 | 19 | 20 | Pts | SF1 | SF2 | Final | GP Pts |
|---|---|---|---|---|---|---|---|---|---|---|---|---|---|---|---|---|---|---|---|---|---|---|---|---|---|---|
| 1 | (Poland) (11) Bartosz Zmarzlik | | | 2 | | | | 3 | | 2 | | | | | 2 | | | | | | 3 | 12 | | | 3 | 20 |
| 2 | (Sweden) (4) Freddie Lindgren | 2 | | | | | | | 3 | | | | 3 | | | | 1 | | | | 2 | 11 | | | 2 | 18 |
| 3 | (Denmark) (13) Leon Madsen | | | | 3 | 3 | | | | | | | 0 | | 1 | | | | | 3 | | 10 | 3 | | 1 | 16 |
| 4 | (Australia) (7) Jack Holder | | 1 | | | | | 2 | | | | | 1 | 3 | | | | | 2 | | | 9 | | 3 | 0 | 14 |
| 5 | (Latvia) (1) Andžejs Ļebedevs | 3 | | | | 2 | | | | 1 | | | | 1 | | | | 3 | | | | 10 | | 2 | | 12 |
| 6 | (United Kingdom) (6) Dan Bewley | | 2 | | | | 1 | | | 3 | | | | | | | 2 | | | 2 | | 10 | 2 | | | 11 |
| 7 | (Denmark) (12) Anders Thomsen | | | 1 | | | | | 2 | | 3 | | | 2 | | | | | | 1 | | 9 | 1 | | | 10 |
| 8 | (Czech Republic) (5) Jan Kvěch | | 3 | | | 0 | | | | | 1 | | | | | 2 | | | | | 0 | 6 | | 1 | | 9 |
| 9 | (Slovakia) (10) Martin Vaculík | | | 3 | | | 2 | | | | | | 2 | | | 1 | | 2 | | | | 10 | | 0 | | 8 |
| 10 | (Australia) (2) Brady Kurtz | 1 | | | | | 0 | | | | 0 | | | | 3 | | | | 3 | | | 7 | 0 | | | 7 |
| 11 | (Denmark) (14) Mikkel Michelsen | | | | 0 | | 3 | | | | | 2 | | 0 | | | | | | | 1 | 6 | | | | 6 |
| 12 | (Germany) (9) Kai Huckenbeck | | | 0 | | 1 | | | | | | 1 | | | | | 3 | | 1 | | | 6 | | | | 5 |
| 13 | (Australia) (15) Max Fricke | | | | 2 | | | 1 | | | 2 | | | | | | 0 | 1 | | | | 6 | | | | 4 |
| 14 | (United Kingdom) (16) Robert Lambert | | | | 1 | | | | 1 | 0 | | | | | | 3 | | | 0 | | | 5 | | | | 3 |
| 15 | (Poland) (8) Dominik Kubera | | 0 | | | | | | 0 | | | 3 | | | 0 | | | 0 | | | | 3 | | | | 2 |
| 16 | (Czech Republic) (3) Daniel Klíma | 0 | | | | | | 0 | | | | 0 | | | | 0 | | | | 0 | | 0 | | | | 1 |
| R1 | (Czech Republic) (R1) Jan Macek | | | | | | | | | | | | | | | | | | | | | 0 | R1 | | | |
| R2 | (Czech Republic) (R2) Jaroslav Vaníček | | | | | | | | | | | | | | | | | | | | | 0 | R2 | | | |

m - exclusion for exceeding two minute time allowance • t - exclusion for touching the tapes • x - other exclusion • e - retired or mechanical failure • f - fell • ns - non-starter • nc - non-classify

| gate A - inside | gate B | gate C | gate D - outside |
