= 2025 Speedway Grand Prix of Sweden =

Speedway Grand Prix event

- Venue: Skrotfrag Arena
- Location: Målilla (Sweden)
- Start date: 5 July 2025
- Competitors: 16 (2 reserves)

The 2025 FIM Speedway Grand Prix of Sweden was the seventh round of the 2025 Speedway Grand Prix season (the World Championship of speedway). It took place on 5 July 2025 at the Skrotfrag Arena in Målilla, Sweden. It was the 30th Speedway Grand Prix of Sweden.

The event was won by Brady Kurtz (his 2nd career Grand Prix win and 2nd in a row).

== Result ==
Placing	Rider	1	2	3	4	5	6	7	8	9	10	11	12	13	14	15	16	17	18	19	20	Pts	SF1	SF2	Final	GP Pts
1	(Australia) (8) Brady Kurtz		3						3			1			3			3				13			3	20
2	(Poland) (9) Bartosz Zmarzlik			2		2						2					2		3			11	3		2	18
3	(United Kingdom) (11) Dan Bewley			3				2		2					2						2	11		3	1	16
4	(Australia) (5) Jason Doyle		2			3					3					3					1	12			0	14
5	(Sweden) (10) Freddie Lindgren			1			2						3			2		2				10		2		12
6	(Czech Republic) (12) Jan Kvěch			0					2		2			0						3		7	2			11
7	(United Kingdom) (4) Robert Lambert	2							1				2				3				3	11		1		10
8	(Australia) (15) Jack Holder				3			3			0						1	1				8	1			9
9	(Latvia) (14) Andžejs Ļebedevs				2		3					3		3							0	11	0			8
10	(Germany) (1) Kai Huckenbeck	1				1				3				1				0				6		0		7
11	(Poland) (2) Dominik Kubera	3					1				1				1				0			6				6
12	(Denmark) (7) Mikkel Michelsen		1					0					1	2					1			5				5
13	(Sweden) (16) Kim Nilsson				1				0	0						1			2			4				4
14	(Australia) (3) Max Fricke	0						1				0				0				2		3				3
15	(Denmark) (6) Anders Thomsen		0				1			1							0			1		3				2
16	(Slovakia) (13) Martin Vaculík				0	0							ns		ns					ns		0				1
R1	(Sweden) (R1) Rasmus Karlsson												0							0		0	R1			
R2	(Sweden) (R2) Sammy Van Dyck														0							0	R2			

m - exclusion for exceeding two minute time allowance • t - exclusion for touching the tapes • x - other exclusion • e - retired or mechanical failure • f - fell • ns - non-starter • nc - non-classify

gate A - inside	gate B	gate C	gate D - outside
