= 2024 Speedway Grand Prix of Great Britain =

Speedway Grand Prix event

- Venue: Principality Stadium
- Location: Cardiff (Wales)
- Start date: 17 August 2024
- Competitors: 16 (2 reserves)

The 2024 FIM Speedway Grand Prix of Great Britain was the seventh round of the 2024 Speedway Grand Prix season (the World Championship of speedway). It took place on 17 August at the Principality Stadium in Cardiff, Wales. It was the 28th Speedway Grand Prix of Great Britain.

The event was won by Dan Bewley (his fourth career Grand Prix win), who also won the sprint race held the day before.

The event was unusual in that nine riders finished on 9 points or above after the 20 heats, which resulted in Maciej Janowski missing out on the semi finals by virtue of world ranking.

== Results ==
=== Sprint result ===
Pos	Rider	GP Points
1	(United Kingdom) Dan Bewley	4
2	(Denmark) Leon Madsen	3
3	(Czech Republic) Jan Kvěch	2
4	(Slovakia) Martin Vaculík	1

=== Grand Prix result ===
Placing	Rider	1	2	3	4	5	6	7	8	9	10	11	12	13	14	15	16	17	18	19	20	Pts	SF1	SF2	Final	GP Pts
1	(United Kingdom) (13) Dan Bewley				3	3							1		2					0		9		3	3	20
2	(United Kingdom) (4) Robert Lambert	3							1				3				2				0	9	3		2	18
3	(Sweden) (7) Freddie Lindgren		2					3					2	0					3			10	2		1	16
4	(Poland) (1) Dominik Kubera	2				2				1				3				2				10		2	0	14
5	(Denmark) (12) Mikkel Michelsen			2					3		1			2						3		11	1			12
6	(Latvia) (10) Andžejs Ļebedevs			3			1						0			3		3				10		1		11
7	(Australia) (6) Jack Holder		1				3			2							3			2		11		0		10
8	(Slovakia) (5) Martin Vaculík		3			0					2					1					3	9	0			9
9	(Poland) (2) Maciej Janowski	0					2				3				3				1			9				8
10	(Poland) (11) Bartosz Zmarzlik			0				2		3					1						1	7				7
11	(Denmark) (9) Leon Madsen			1		1						2					1		2			7				6
12	(Australia) (14) Max Fricke				1		0					1		1							2	5				5
13	(United Kingdom) (16) Tom Brennan				0				2	0						2			0			4				4
14	(Czech Republic) (8) Jan Kvěch		0						0			3			0			0				3				3
15	(Germany) (15) Kai Huckenbeck				2			0			0						0	1				3				2
16	(Poland) (3) Szymon Woźniak	1						1				0				0				1		3				1
R1	(United Kingdom) (R1) Sam Hagon																					0	R1			
R2	(United Kingdom) (R2) Leon Flint																					0	R2			

m - exclusion for exceeding two minute time allowance • t - exclusion for touching the tapes • x - other exclusion • e - retired or mechanical failure • f - fell • ns - non-starter • nc - non-classify

gate A - inside	gate B	gate C	gate D - outside
