= 2025 Speedway Grand Prix of Poland =

Speedway Grand Prix event

2025 Speedway Grand Prix of Poland I, II, and III
- Venue: Stadion Narodowy; Edward Jancarz Stadium; Olympic Stadium
- Location: Warsaw; Gorzów; Wrocław
- Start date: 17 May; 21 June; 30 August
- Competitors: 16 (2 reserves)

The 2025 FIM Speedway Grand Prix of Poland were the second, sixth and ninth rounds of the 2025 Speedway Grand Prix season (the World Championship).

The second round took place on 17 May 2025 at the Stadion Narodowy in Warsaw. The sixth round took place at the Edward Jancarz Stadium in Gorzów Wielkopolski on 22 June. The ninth round took place on 30 August at the Olympic Stadium in Wrocław.

The rounds were the 65th, 66th and 67th Speedway Grand Prix of Poland respectively.

The Orlen Oil Warsaw Grand Prix was won by Australian Jack Holder, which was his second career Grand Prix win after his first in Croatia during 2024. Brady Kurtz won his maiden Grand Prix when winning the Gorzów Grand Prix (event 2) and he continued his run of form by winning event 3 in Wrocław.

== Results ==
=== Event 1 - Warsaw Grand Prix (17 May) ===
==== Sprint result ====
Pos	Rider	GP Points
1	(Czech Republic) Jan Kvěch	4
2	(Australia) Brady Kurtz	3
3	(United Kingdom) Robert Lambert	2
4	(United Kingdom) Dan Bewley	1

==== Main round ====
Placing	Rider	1	2	3	4	5	6	7	8	9	10	11	12	13	14	15	16	17	18	19	20	Pts	SF1	SF2	Final	GP Pts
1	(Australia) (12) Jack Holder			3					3		3			3						2		14			3	20
2	(Australia) (13) Brady Kurtz				2	3							3		2					3		13			2	18
3	(Poland) (11) Patryk Dudek			2				3		1					3						1	10		3	1	16
4	(Poland) (3) Dominik Kubera	3						0				0				3				0		6	3		0	14
5	(Latvia) (1) Andžejs Ļebedevs	2				1				3				2				3				11	2			12
6	(United Kingdom) (5) Robert Lambert		1			2					1					2					3	9		2		11
7	(Sweden) (8) Freddie Lindgren		3						2			3			0			2				10		1		10
8	(Poland) (9) Bartosz Zmarzlik			1		0						2					3		3			9	1			9
9	(Australia) (16) Max Fricke				3				1	2						0			0			6	0			8
10	(Denmark) (7) Anders Thomsen		3					2					0	1					1			7		0		7
11	(Denmark) (2) Mikkel Michelsen	1					2				0				1				2			6				6
12	(Australia) (10) Jason Doyle			0			3						2			ns		ns				5				5
13	(United Kingdom) (14) Dan Bewley				1		1					1		0							2	5				4
14	(Czech Republic) (6) Jan Kvěch		0				0			0							2			1		3				3
15	(Slovakia) (15) Martin Vaculík				0			1			2						0	0				3				2
16	(Germany) (4) Kai Huckenbeck	0							0				1				1				0	2				1
R1	(Poland) (R1) Mateusz Cierniak															1						1	R1			
R2	(Poland) (R2) Bartłomiej Kowalski																	1				1	R2			

m - exclusion for exceeding two minute time allowance • t - exclusion for touching the tapes • x - other exclusion • e - retired or mechanical failure • f - fell • ns - non-starter • nc - non-classify

gate A - inside	gate B	gate C	gate D - outside

=== Event 2 - Gorzów Grand Prix (22 June) ===
==== Sprint result ====
Pos	Rider	GP Points
1	(United Kingdom) Dan Bewley	4
2	(Sweden) Freddie Lindgren	3
3	(Poland) Bartosz Zmarzlik	2
4	(Australia) Jack Holder	1

==== Main round ====
Placing	Rider	1	2	3	4	5	6	7	8	9	10	11	12	13	14	15	16	17	18	19	20	Pts	SF1	SF2	Final	GP Pts
1	(Australia) (14) Brady Kurtz				2		3					1		3							3	12			3	20
2	(Poland) (9) Bartosz Zmarzlik			3		1						3					3		3			13			2	18
3	(United Kingdom) (13) Dan Bewley				0	3							3		3					2		11		3	1	16
4	(Sweden) (5) Freddie Lindgren		3			2					2					3					2	12	3		0	14
5	(Australia) (6) Jason Doyle		1				0			3							2			0		6	2			12
6	(Denmark) (7) Anders Thomsen		2					1					f	2					1			6		2		11
7	(Australia) (11) Max Fricke			1				2		2					2						1	8		1		10
8	(Denmark) (15) Mikkel Michelsen				1			0			1						1	3				6	1			9
9	(Australia) (12) Jack Holder			2					2		3			1						3		11		0		8
10	(Czech Republic) (3) Jan Kvěch	3						3				0				2				1		9	0			7
11	(Poland) (8) Dominik Kubera		0						3			2			0			0				5				6
12	(Latvia) (10) Andžejs Ļebedevs			0			2						1			1		1				5				5
13	(United Kingdom) (2) Robert Lambert	1					1				0				1				2			5				4
14	(Germany) (16) Kai Huckenbeck				3				1	0						ns			ns			4				3
15	(Poland) (1) Oskar Paluch	0				0				1				0				2				3				2
R1	(Poland) (R1) Bartłomiej Kowalski												2				0				0	2	R1			
17	(Slovakia) (4) Martin Vaculík	2							f				ns				ns				ns	2				0
R2	(Poland) (R2) Kevin Małkiewicz															0			0			0	R2			

m - exclusion for exceeding two minute time allowance • t - exclusion for touching the tapes • x - other exclusion • e - retired or mechanical failure • f - fell • ns - non-starter • nc - non-classify

gate A - inside	gate B	gate C	gate D - outside

=== Event 3 - Wrocław Grand Prix (30 August) ===
==== Sprint result ====
Pos	Rider	GP Points
1	(United Kingdom) Dan Bewley	4
2	(United Kingdom) Robert Lambert	3
3	(Poland) Bartosz Zmarzlik	2
4	(Australia) Max Fricke	1

==== Main round ====
Placing	Rider	1	2	3	4	5	6	7	8	9	10	11	12	13	14	15	16	17	18	19	20	Pts	SF1	SF2	Final	GP Pts
1	(Australia) (3) Brady Kurtz	3						3				2				3				2		13			3	20
2	(Poland) (13) Bartosz Zmarzlik				3	3							3		3					3		15			2	18
3	(United Kingdom) (9) Dan Bewley			0		2						1					3		2			8		3	1	16
4	(Australia) (7) Jack Holder		1					2					2	2					0			7	3		0	14
5	(Australia) (10) Jason Doyle			3			3						0			2		2				10		2		12
6	(Latvia) (4) Andžejs Ļebedevs	2							2				1				0				2	7	2			11
7	(Denmark) (6) Mikkel Michelsen		3				2			2							2			1		10		1		10
8	(Denmark) (11) Anders Thomsen			2				1		3					2						1	9	1			9
9	(Poland) (8) Maciej Janowski		2						3			0			0			1				6		0		8
10	(Australia) (14) Max Fricke				1		1					3		3							3	11	0			7
11	(Sweden) (2) Freddie Lindgren	1					0				0				1				3			5				6
12	(Czech Republic) (16) Jan Kvěch				2				0	1						1			1			5				5
13	(Germany) (1) Kai Huckenbeck	0				0				0				1				3				4				4
14	(Slovakia) (15) Martin Vaculík				0			0			3						1	0				4				3
15	(United Kingdom) (5) Robert Lambert		0			1					2					0					0	3				2
16	(Poland) (12) Dominik Kubera			1					1		1			0						0		3				1
R1	(Poland) (R1) Marcel Kowolik																					0	R1			
R2	(Poland) (R2) Nikodem Mikołajczyk																					0	R2			

m - exclusion for exceeding two minute time allowance • t - exclusion for touching the tapes • x - other exclusion • e - retired or mechanical failure • f - fell • ns - non-starter • nc - non-classify

gate A - inside	gate B	gate C	gate D - outside
