= 2026 Speedway Grand Prix Qualification =

World speedway event

Speedway Grand Prix Qualification
- Dates: 7 June to 9 August 2025

The 2026 Individual Speedway World Championship Grand Prix Qualification or GP Challenge was a series of motorcycle speedway meetings held during 2025 to determine the riders that qualified for the 2026 Speedway Grand Prix. The series consisted of three qualifying rounds at Žarnovica, Lonigo and Abensberg and the Grand Prix Challenge at Holsted.

The four riders that qualified for the 2026 Speedway Grand Prix series were Dominik Kubera, Kacper Woryna, Leon Madsen and Andžejs Ļebedevs. They will join the top seven riders from the 2025 Speedway Grand Prix along with the 2025 European Champion and three wildcard selections.

== FIM Qualifying rounds ==
=== Round One ===
- 7 June 2025
- (Slovakia) Žarnovica (Speedway stadium Žarnovica)

Pos.	Rider	Points	Details
1	(Denmark) Anders Thomsen	12+3	(2,1,3,3,3)
2	(Slovenia) Matej Žagar	12+2	(1,3,3,3,2)
3	(Poland) Kacper Woryna	12+R	(3,3,2,1,3)
4	(Slovakia) Martin Vaculík	11	(3,2,1,3,2)
5	(Latvia) Andžejs Ļebedevs	10	(1,3,2,1,3)
6	(Norway) Mathias Pollestad	9	(2,2,3,2,0)
7	(United States) Luke Becker	9	(0,2,2,2,3)
8	(Czech Republic) Václav Milík	8	(3,0,1,3,1)
9	(France) David Bellego	8	(1,1,3,2,1)
10	(Australia) Chris Holder	8	(2,1,1,2,2)
11	(Ukraine) Marko Levishyn	6	(3,2,0,0,1)
12	(Sweden) Oliver Berntzon	4	(1,3,0,1,R)
13	(United Kingdom) Adam Ellis	4	(2,R,0,0,2)
14	(Slovenia) Matic Ivačič	4	(0,0,2,1,1)
15	(Romania) Andrei Popa	1	(D,0,1,0,0)
16	(Finland) Antti Vuolas	0	(0,1,X,-,-)
17	(Slovakia) Jakub Valković (res)	0	(0)
18	(Slovakia) Anna Hajková (res)	0	(X)

=== Round Two ===
- 7 June 2025
- (Italy) Lonigo (Santa Marina Stadium)

Pos.	Rider	Points	Details
1	(Poland) Mateusz Cierniak	14	(2,3,3,3,3)
2	(Latvia) Francis Gusts	13	(2,3,3,3,2)
3	(Denmark) Rasmus Jensen	10+3	(3,3,1,3,0)
4	(Czech Republic) Jan Kvěch	10+2	(3,2,3,1,1)
5	(Germany) Kevin Wölbert	9+4	(1,1,2,2,3)
6	(Italy) Michele Paco Castagna	9+3	(3,2,R,2,2)
7	(Italy) Nicolás Covatti	9+2	(1,2,0,3,3)
8	(Sweden) Jacob Thorssell	9+1	(1,3,2,1,2)
9	(Australia) Rohan Tungate	9+0	(2,2,2,2,1)
10	(France) Dimitri Bergé	8	(3,1,2,2,0)
11	(United Kingdom) Tom Brennan	7	(2,1,3,R,1)
12	(Slovenia) Anže Grmek	4	(0,0,1,0,3)
13	(Austria) Sebastian Kössler	4	(1,1,1,1,D)
14	(United States) Gino Manzares	3	(0,X,0,1,2)
15	(Germany) Richard Geyer	2	(0,X,1,0,1)
16	(Argentina) Alex Acuña	0	(0,X,R,R,R)

=== Round Three ===
- 9 June 2025
- (Germany) Abensberg (Wack Hofmeister Stadium)

Pos.	Rider	Points	Details
1	(Germany) Kai Huckenbeck	14	(3,3,2,3,3)
2	(Denmark) Michael Jepsen Jensen	13	(3,3,3,2,2)
3	(Australia) Jack Holder	12	(2,3,1,3,3)
4	(Poland) Dominik Kubera	11	(3,2,3,3,X)
5	(Germany) Erik Riss	11	(3,1,2,3,2)
6	(Sweden) Kim Nilsson	10	(2,2,3,2,1)
7	(Czech Republic) Daniel Klíma	9	(2,3,0,2,2)
8	(Finland) Jesse Mustonen	8	(1,1,2,1,3)
9	(Italy) Nicolas Vicentin	5	(2,1,0,2,0)
10	(Argentina) Carlos Eber Ampugnani	5	(0,2,1,1,1)
11	(Austria) Dany Gappmaier	4	(0,2,0,0,2)
12	(Ukraine) Andriy Rozaliuk	4	(1,0,1,1,1)
13	(United Kingdom) Jake Mulford	3	(0,0,3,X,X)
14	(Germany) Valentin Grobauer (res)	3	(3)
15	(Norway) Glenn Moi	3	(1,0,2,0,0)
16	(Latvia) Damirs Filimonovs	1	(0,U,1,X,-)
17	(France) Mathias Trésarrieu	1	(1,U,X,X,-)
18	(Germany) Martin Smolinski (res)	1	(1)

== 2025 Speedway Grand Prix Challenge ==
=== Grand Prix Challenge ===
- 9 August 2025
- (Denmark) Holsted (Holsted Speedway Center)

Pos.	Rider	Points	Total
1	(Poland) Dominik Kubera	13+3	(3,2,3,2,3)
2	(Poland) Kacper Woryna	11+2	(3,3,2,3,0)
3	(Denmark) Leon Madsen	12+1	(3,3,2,3,1)
4	(Latvia) Andžejs Ļebedevs	12+0	(1,3,3,3,2)
5	(Denmark) Michael Jepsen Jensen	10	(3,3,W,1,3)
6	(Denmark) Anders Thomsen	9	(2,2,0,2,3)
7	(Slovakia) Martin Vaculík	8	(1,0,3,1,3)
8	(Poland) Mateusz Cierniak	7	(1,0,1,3,2)
9	(Czech Republic) Jan Kvěch	7	(0,1,3,2,1)
10	(Slovenia) Matej Žagar	6	(2,1,2,1,0)
11	(Sweden) Kim Nilsson	5	(2,1,1,0,1)
12	(Germany) Kevin Wölbert	4	(0,2,0,0,2)
13	(Denmark) Bastian Pedersen (res)	4	(-,-,2,-,2)
14	(Germany) Kai Huckenbeck	4	(0,0,1,2,1)
15	(Latvia) Francis Gusts	3	(1,2,0,0,0)
16	(Norway) Mathias Pollestad	3	(2,0,1,0,0)
17	(Denmark) Rasmus Jensen	1	(0,1,-,-,-)
18	(Denmark) Mikkel Andersen (res)	1	(-,-,-,1,-)

Kim Nilsson and Mathias Pollestad replaced Erik Riss and Jack Holder in the line-up. Leon Madsen was given the wildcard.
