= 2025 Speedway of Nations =

Speedway competition for national teams

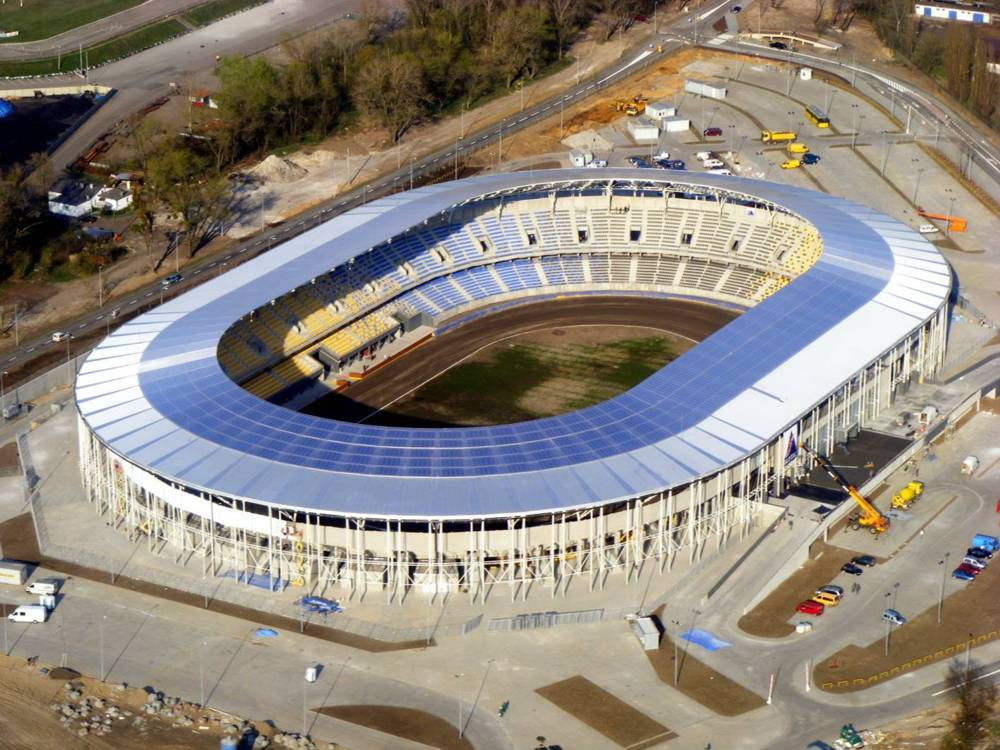
MotoArena stadium, Toruń, BiT City, Kuyavian–Pomeranian, northern Poland

The 2025 Speedway of Nations was the seventh edition of the Speedway of Nations, and 33rd edition of a pairs competition for national teams in motorcycle speedway.

The competition consisted of three events, which took place at the MotoArena Toruń in Toruń, Poland, between 30 September and 4 October 2025. The under-21 Speedway of Nations 2 took place at the same venue on 3 October.

Great Britain were the defending champions having won in 2024.

Australia won the title, beating hosts Poland in the Grand Final, with Brady Kurtz and Jack Holder getting the better of Bartosz Zmarzlik and Patryk Dudek. Denmark took bronze. It was Australia's second Speedway of Nations title after winning the 2022 edition.

The next Speedway of Nations will take place in 2027, as the competition will be replaced with the return of the Speedway World Cup in 2026.

== Summary ==
Sweden won the first semi-final, edging Great Britain into second place. Latvia also secured their place in the final by beating Germany in the 'final qualifier. All three teams joined hosts Poland in the decider.

Australia comfortably won the second semi-final, only dropping one point, with Denmark finishing second. The Czech Republic took the last final spot after beating Ukraine in the second 'final qualifier'.

In the final, the Australian team of Brady Kurtz and Jack Holder topped the standings on 37 points and went straight through to the Grand Final. Poland finished second on 35 points with Denmark in third on 34 points. Sweden finished fourth ahead of defending champions Great Britain in fifth. Latvia and Czech Republic were sixth and seventh respectively.

Poland beat Denmark in the Grand Final Qualifier. Denmark's Michael Jepsen Jensen won the race, however Leon Madsen was excluded, leaving Patryk Dudek and Bartosz Zmarzlik to finish second and third and ensure their progression.

Australia won the 2025 Speedway of Nations by beating Poland 7-2 in the Grand Final, with Kurtz and Holder finishing first and second ahead of Zmarzlik and Dudek.

== First semi-final ==
- MotoArena, Toruń, Poland
- 30 September (top 2 to final, 3rd-4th to final qualifier)
- Sweden won every race, losing any points only against Germany (with Kai Huckenbeck at the 2nd position) and Norway (with Mathias Pollestad at the 2nd position). On the other hand, Italy lost every race, scoring more than 2 points only against Slovenia (with Nicolás Covatti at the 1st position).

Pos	Nation	Riders	Pts
1	Sweden	Fredrik Lindgren (C) 18, Jacob Thorssell 14, Timo Lahti 8	40
2	Great Britain	Dan Bewley 22, Robert Lambert (C) 15, Tom Brennan 0	37
3	Latvia	Andžejs Ļebedevs (C) 20, Daniils Kolodinskis 8, Jevgeņijs Kostigovs 2	30
4	Germany	Kai Huckenbeck (C) 17, Norick Blödorn 9, Valentin Grobauer 0	26
5	Norway	Mathias Pollestad (C) 19, Lasse Fredriksen 7, Glenn Moi 0	26
6	Slovenia	Anže Grmek (C) 11, Matic Ivačič 5, Luka Omerzel 0	16
7	Italy	Nicolás Covatti (C) 12, Nicolas Vicentin 2, Niccolò Percotti 0	14

=== Final Qualifier ===
1st	2nd
Latvia - 7 Andžejs Ļebedevs - 4 Daniils Kolodinskis - 3	Germany - 2 Norick Blödorn - 2 Kai Huckenbeck - 0

== Second semi-final ==
- MotoArena, Toruń, Poland
- 1 October (top 2 to final, 3rd-4th to final qualifier)
- Australia won every race, losing any points only against Ukraine (with Nazar Parnitskyi at the 2nd position). On the other hand, Argentina lost every race with: 7–2 (always two last places).

Pos	Nation	Riders	Pts
1	Australia	Jack Holder (C) 22, Brady Kurtz 14, Jason Doyle 5	41
2	Denmark	Michael Jepsen Jensen 16, Leon Madsen 15, Mikkel Michelsen (C) 6	37
3	Ukraine	Nazar Parnitskyi 21, Marko Levishyn (C) 11, Roman Kapustin 0	32
4	Czech Republic	Jan Kvěch (C) 16, Adam Bednar 8, Václav Milík 3	27
5	France	Dimitri Bergé 16, David Bellego (C) 6, Mathias Trésarrieu 0	22
6	Finland	Antti Vuolas 15, Jesse Mustonen (C) 3, Tero Aarnio 0	18
7	Argentina	Cristian Zubillaga 8, Fernando Garcia (C) 2 , Facundo Albin 2	12

=== Final Qualifier ===
1st	2nd
Czech Republic - 6 Adam Bednar - 4 Jan Kvěch - 2	Ukraine - 3 Nazar Parnitskyi - 3 Marko Levishyn - 0

== Final ==
- MotoArena, Toruń, Poland
- 4 October
- Australia lost only one race (7–2 against Poland). On the other hand, Czech Rep. lost every race, scoring more than 2 points only against Latvia (with Jan Kvěch at the 1st position).

Pos	Nation	Riders	Pts
1	Australia	Brady Kurtz, 20 Jack Holder (C) 17, Jason Doyle DNR	37
2	Poland	Bartosz Zmarzlik (C) 18, Patryk Dudek 17, Piotr Pawlicki Jr. DNR	35
3	Denmark	Leon Madsen 18, Michael Jepsen Jensen 16, Mikkel Michelsen (C) DNR	34
4	Sweden	Fredrik Lindgren (C) 21, Jacob Thorssell 6, Timo Lahti DNR	27
5	Great Britain	Robert Lambert (C) 16, Dan Bewley 6, Tom Brennan 2	24
6	Latvia	Andžejs Ļebedevs (C) 14, Daniils Kolodinskis 4, Jevgeņijs Kostigovs 0	18
7	Czech Republic	Jan Kvěch (C) 12, Václav Milík 2, Adam Bednar 0	14

=== Grand Final Qualifier ===
1st	2nd
Poland - 5 Patryk Dudek - 3 Bartosz Zmarzlik - 2	Denmark - 4 Michael Jepsen Jensen - 4 Leon Madsen - X

=== Grand Final ===
1st	2nd
Australia - 7 Brady Kurtz - 4 Jack Holder - 3	Poland - 2 Bartosz Zmarzlik - 2 Patryk Dudek - 0
