= Speedway of Nations =

World motorcycle speedway competition

FIM Speedway of Nations
- Current season, competition or edition: 2025 Speedway of Nations
- Formerly: Speedway World Pairs Championship (held 1968-1993)
- Sport: Motorcycle speedway
- Founded: 2018
- Director: Phil Morris
- Motto: No brakes, no gears, no fear
- No. of teams: 15 national teams
- Continent: World
- Most recent champion: Australia
- Most titles: Russia (3 times)
- Broadcaster: TNT Sports (United Kingdom) (UK)
- Website: fimspeedway.com/son

The Speedway of Nations is a motorcycle speedway event for national teams, held each year in a different country. The first edition of the competition in the current format took place in 2018. It was the first time an official FIM international pairs competition was staged since the World Pairs Championship ceased in 1993. Australia are the current champions after winning in 2025. The Speedway of Nations was not held in 2023 due to the return of the Speedway World Cup, but returned to the speedway calendar in 2024 and 2025.

== Format ==
Each meeting is staged between seven national teams, with each national team represented by two riders. Each pairing rides against each other once. The combined total of each pair will be used to determine the outcome.

Two semi-finals are held with the top three teams in each progressing to the final. The final is then staged between the hosts and the six qualified nations. It takes places over two rounds, with the second and third placed nations progressing to the semi-final, which is a single race. The winner of the semi-final faces the first placed nation in the Grand Final. The Grand Final winners are crowned Speedway of Nations champions.

== Winners ==
Year	Venue	Winners	Runner-up	3rd place
2018	(Poland) Olympic Stadium; Wrocław	Russia (45 pts); Artem Laguta; Emil Sayfutdinov; Gleb Chugunov	(United Kingdom) Great Britain (46 pts); Tai Woffinden; Robert Lambert; Craig Cook	Poland (36 pts); Maciej Janowski; Patryk Dudek; Maksym Drabik
2019	(Russia) Anatoly Stepanov Stadium; Tolyatti	Russia (45 pts); Artem Laguta; Emil Sayfutdinov; Gleb Chugunov	Poland (47 pts); Bartosz Zmarzlik; Patryk Dudek; Maksym Drabik; Maciej Janowski	Australia (41 pts); Jason Doyle; Max Fricke; Jaimon Lidsey
2020	(Poland) Stadion MOSiR; Lublin	Russia (23 pts); Emil Sayfutdinov; Artem Laguta; Evgeny Saidullin	Poland (23 pts); Bartosz Zmarzlik; Szymon Woźniak; Dominik Kubera	Denmark (19 pts); Leon Madsen; Marcus Birkemose; Anders Thomsen
2021	(England) National Speedway Stadium; Manchester	(United Kingdom) Great Britain (64 pts); Robert Lambert; Dan Bewley; Tai Woffinden; Tom Brennan	Poland (74 pts); Bartosz Zmarzlik; Maciej Janowski; Jakub Miśkowiak	Denmark (68 pts); Leon Madsen; Mikkel Michelsen; Mads Hansen
2022	(Denmark) Vojens Speedway Center; Vojens	Australia (30 pts); Jack Holder; Max Fricke; Jason Doyle	(United Kingdom) Great Britain (32 pts); Dan Bewley; Robert Lambert; Tai Woffinden	Sweden (30 pts); Fredrik Lindgren; Oliver Berntzon; Victor Palovaara
2024	(England) National Speedway Stadium; Manchester	(United Kingdom) Great Britain (35 pts); Robert Lambert; Dan Bewley; Tom Brennan	Australia (36 pts); Jack Holder; Brady Kurtz; Max Fricke	Sweden (27 pts); Fredrik Lindgren; Jacob Thorssell; Oliver Berntzon
2025	(Poland) MotoArena; Toruń	Australia (37 pts); Brady Kurtz; Jack Holder; Jason Doyle	Poland (35 pts); Bartosz Zmarzlik; Patryk Dudek; Piotr Pawlicki Jr.	Denmark (34 pts); Leon Madsen; Michael Jepsen Jensen; Mikkel Michelsen

- 2020 Finished after 14 Heats due to bad weather condition. Russia awarded gold as they beat Poland in Heat 8.

== Medal classification ==
Pos	National Team	Gold	Silver	Bronze	Total
1.	Russia	3	-	-	3
2.	Great Britain	2	2	-	4
3.	Australia	2	1	1	4
4.	Poland	-	4	1	5
5.	Denmark	-	-	3	3
6.	Sweden	-	-	2	2

== Leading riders ==
Pos	Rider	Team	Gold	Silver	Bronze	Total
1.	Artem Laguta	Russia	3	-	-	3
	Emil Sayfutdinov	Russia	3	-	-	3
3.	Robert Lambert	Great Britain	2	2	-	4
4.	Dan Bewley	Great Britain	2	1	-	3
	Jack Holder	Australia	2	1	-	3
6.	Jason Doyle	Australia	2	-	1	3
7.	Gleb Chugunov	Russia	2	-	-	2
	Tom Brennan	Great Britain	2	-	-	2
9.	Tai Woffinden	Great Britain	1	2	-	3
10.	Max Fricke	Australia	1	1	1	3
11.	Brady Kurtz	Australia	1	1	-	2
12.	Evgeny Saidullin	Russia	1	-	-	1

== See also ==
- Speedway World Pairs Championship
- Speedway World Team Cup
- Speedway World Cup
- Speedway Grand Prix
- Team Speedway Junior World Championship (U-21)
- Ice Speedway of Nations
- List of world championships
