= Speedway Grand Prix of Great Britain =

Round of the motorcycle speedway world championship

(United Kingdom) British Speedway Grand Prix
- Stadium: National Speedway Stadium, Manchester, England
- Years: 30 (1995–present)
- Track Length: 347 m

Last Event (season 2025)
- Date: 14 June 2025
- Winner: (Poland) Bartosz Zmarzlik

The Speedway Grand Prix of Great Britain is a motorcycle speedway event that is a part of the Speedway Grand Prix (world championship) series.

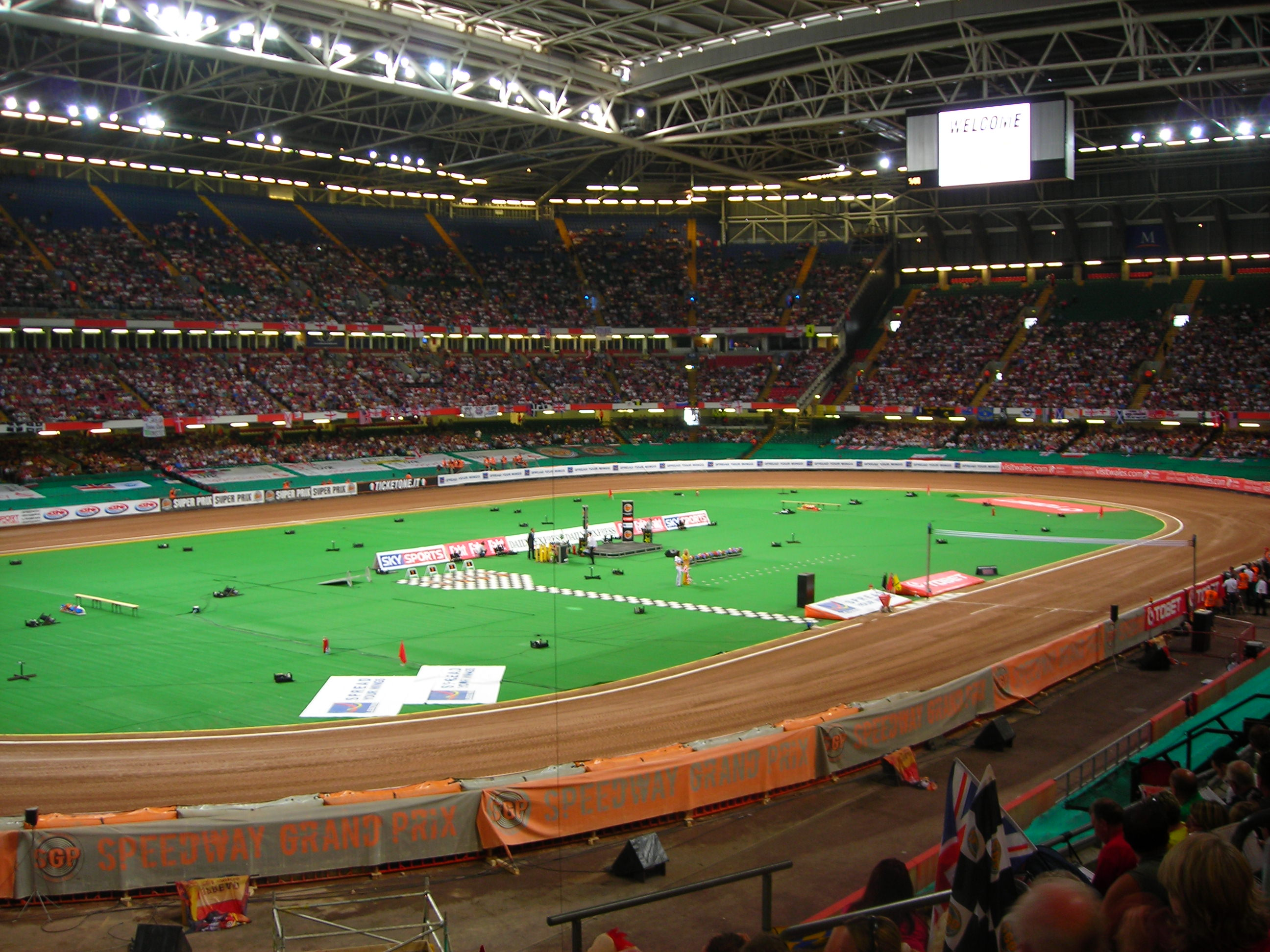
The temporary track in the Millennium Stadium hosted the event from 2001 to 2024

The Millennium Stadium hosted the British GP for the first time in 2001 until 2025. The National Speedway Stadium in Manchester was included as a venue for the 2025 Speedway Grand Prix in addition to Cardiff but the 2025 Grand Prix in Cardiff was cancelled in December 2024 and replaced by a second GP in Manchester. The 2027 Grand Prix will be staged at Foxhall Stadium in Ipswich.

== Winners ==
	Season	City	Stadium	Winner
1	1995	London	London Stadium	(United States) Greg Hancock	result
2	1996	London	London Stadium	(Australia) Jason Crump	result
3	1997	Bradford	Odsal Stadium	(Denmark) Brian Andersen	result
4	1998	Coventry	Brandon Stadium	(Australia) Jason Crump	result
5	1999	Coventry	Brandon Stadium	(Sweden) Tony Rickardsson	result
6	2000	Coventry	Brandon Stadium	(United Kingdom) Martin Dugard	result
7	2001	Cardiff	Millennium Stadium	(Sweden) Tony Rickardsson	result
8	2002	Cardiff	Millennium Stadium	(Australia) Ryan Sullivan	result
9	2003	Cardiff	Millennium Stadium	(Denmark) Nicki Pedersen	result
10	2004	Cardiff	Millennium Stadium	(United States) Greg Hancock	result
11	2005	Cardiff	Millennium Stadium	(Sweden) Tony Rickardsson	result
12	2006	Cardiff	Millennium Stadium	(Australia) Jason Crump	result
13	2007	Cardiff	Millennium Stadium	(United Kingdom) Chris Harris	result
14	2008	Cardiff	Millennium Stadium	(Australia) Jason Crump	result
15	2009	Cardiff	Millennium Stadium	(Australia) Jason Crump	result
16	2010	Cardiff	Millennium Stadium	(Australia) Chris Holder	result
17	2011	Cardiff	Millennium Stadium	(United States) Greg Hancock	result
18	2012	Cardiff	Millennium Stadium	(Australia) Chris Holder	result
19	2013	Cardiff	Millennium Stadium	(Russia) Emil Sayfutdinov	result
20	2014	Cardiff	Millennium Stadium	(United States) Greg Hancock	result
21	2015	Cardiff	Millennium Stadium	(Denmark) Niels-Kristian Iversen	result
22	2016	Cardiff	Millennium Stadium	(Sweden) Antonio Lindbäck	result
23	2017	Cardiff	Millennium Stadium	(Poland) Maciej Janowski	result
24	2018	Cardiff	Millennium Stadium	(Poland) Bartosz Zmarzlik	result
25	2019	Cardiff	Millennium Stadium	(Denmark) Leon Madsen	result
26	2022	Cardiff	Millennium Stadium	(United Kingdom) Dan Bewley	result
27	2023	Cardiff	Millennium Stadium	(Slovakia) Martin Vaculík	result
28	2024	Cardiff	Millennium Stadium	(United Kingdom) Dan Bewley	result
29	2025	Manchester	National Speedway Stadium	(United Kingdom) Dan Bewley	result
30	2025	Manchester	National Speedway Stadium	(Poland) Bartosz Zmarzlik	result

== Most wins ==
(Australia) Jason Crump 5 times
