= 2022 Speedway Grand Prix of Great Britain =

Speedway Grand Prix event

- Venue: Principality Stadium
- Location: Cardiff (Wales)
- Start date: 13 August 2022
- Competitors: 16 (2 reserves)

The 2022 FIM Speedway Grand Prix of Great Britain was the sixth round of the 2022 Speedway Grand Prix season (the World Championship of speedway). It took place on 13 August at the Principality Stadium in Cardiff, Wales. It was the 26th Speedway Grand Prix of Great Britain.

The event was won by Dan Bewley (his maiden career Grand Prix win).

== Grand Prix result ==
Placing	Rider	1	2	3	4	5	6	7	8	9	10	11	12	13	14	15	16	17	18	19	20	Pts	SF1	SF2	Final	GP Pts
1	(United Kingdom) (13) Dan Bewley				3	3							2		1					3		12	2		3	20
2	(Poland) (10) Bartosz Zmarzlik			3			2						3			1		2				11		2	2	18
3	(Poland) (2) Patryk Dudek	3					0				3				3				1			10	3		1	16
4	(Denmark) (6) Leon Madsen		2				1			3							2			2		10		3	0	14
5	(Australia) (5) Jack Holder		3			1					2					3					3	12		1		12
6	(Sweden) (15) Freddie Lindgren				2			3			0						3	1				9	1			11
7	(Denmark) (14) Mikkel Michelsen				0		3					3		x							2	8		0		10
8	(Australia) (12) Jason Doyle			2					3		1			3						f		9	x			9
9	(Australia) (16) Max Fricke				1				1	2						2			2			8				8
10	(Poland) (1) Maciej Janowski	2				2				1				2				0				7				7
11	(Latvia) (9) Andžejs Ļebedevs			e		0						2					x		3			5				6
12	(United Kingdom) (8) Robert Lambert		1						0			1e			0			3				5				5
13	(United Kingdom) (4) Tai Woffinden	1							2				1				ns				ns	4				4
14	(Poland) (3) Paweł Przedpełski	0						2				0				e				1		3				3
15	(Denmark) (11) Anders Thomsen			1				e		e					2						0	3				2
16	(United Kingdom) (7) Adam Ellis		f					ns					ns	ns					ns			0				1
R1	(United Kingdom) (R1) Tom Brennan							1						1					0			2	R1			
R2	(United Kingdom) (R2) Leon Flint												0				1				1	2	R2			

m - exclusion for exceeding two minute time allowance • t - exclusion for touching the tapes • x - other exclusion • e - retired or mechanical failure • f - fell • ns - non-starter • nc - non-classify

gate A - inside	gate B	gate C	gate D - outside
