= Speedway Grand Prix of Latvia =

Round of the motorcycle speedway world championship

(Latvia) Latvian Speedway Grand Prix
- Stadium: Riga Speedway Stadium, Riga, Latvia
- Years: 10 (2006–2009, 2013–2015, 2017, 2023–2025)
- Track: speedway track
- Track Length: 373 m

Last Event (season 2025)
- Date: 2 August 2025
- Winner: (Australia) Brady Kurtz

The Speedway Grand Prix of Latvia is a motorcycle speedway event that is a part of the Speedway Grand Prix series (the world championship).

== History ==
From 2006 until 2017 the Grand Prix was held at the Latvijas Spīdveja Centrs in Daugavpils. In 2023, the event returned to Latvia but at the new venue known as Riga Speedway Stadium.

The 2023 event was won by Bartosz Zmarzlik, which equalled the 22 career Grand Prix wins of fellow Pole Tomasz Gollob.

== Past winners ==
	Season	City	Stadium	Winner
1	2006	Daugavpils	Latvijas Spīdveja Centrs	(United States) Greg Hancock	result
2	2007	Daugavpils	Latvijas Spīdveja Centrs	(Australia) Leigh Adams	result
3	2008	Daugavpils	Latvijas Spīdveja Centrs	(Australia) Jason Crump	result
4	2009	Daugavpils	Latvijas Spīdveja Centrs	(United States) Greg Hancock	result
5	2013	Daugavpils	Latvijas Spīdveja Centrs	(United States) Greg Hancock	result
6	2014	Daugavpils	Latvijas Spīdveja Centrs	(Poland) Krzysztof Kasprzak	result
7	2015	Daugavpils	Latvijas Spīdveja Centrs	(Poland) Maciej Janowski	result
8	2017	Daugavpils	Latvijas Spīdveja Centrs	(Poland) Piotr Pawlicki Jr.	result
9	2023	Riga	Riga Speedway Stadium	(Poland) Bartosz Zmarzlik	result
10	2024	Riga	Riga Speedway Stadium	(Poland) Bartosz Zmarzlik	result
11	2025	Riga	Riga Speedway Stadium	(Australia) Brady Kurtz	result

== Most wins ==
(United States) Greg Hancock 3 times

== See also ==
- Latvia national speedway team
