= 2020 Speedway of Nations =

Motorcycle racing competition

The 2020 Speedway of Nations (sponsored by Monster Energy) was the third FIM Speedway of Nations. The competition was scheduled to consist of a two-legged final but was reduced to a single leg because of heavy rain on the opening day. The Speedway of Nations normally also includes a semi-final stage, which was due to be run in Latvia in September. The semi-final was cancelled for 2020 due to the COVID-19 pandemic and the top seven nations from the 2019 Speedway of Nations were seeded direct to the final. Germany withdrew from the competition, and were replaced by the Czech Republic. The final was originally scheduled to be staged on 24 and 25 October 2020 at the National Speedway Stadium in Manchester. but was rescheduled and held in Lublin on 17 October due to increased COVID-19 restrictions in the United Kingdom.

The one-off final was won by Russia, who completed a third consecutive title win. The bad weather brought the final to an early finish after 15 heats with Russia and Poland tied on 23 points each. Russia were declared champions by virtue of beating Poland in their head to head in heat 8.

== Final ==
- Lublin, Poland
- 17 October

Pos	Nation	Riders	Pts
1	Russia	Emil Sayfutdinov 15, Artem Laguta 8, Evgeny Saidullin dnr	23
2	Poland	Bartosz Zmarzlik 15, Szymon Woźniak 8, Dominik Kubera dnr	23
3	Denmark	Leon Madsen 10, Marcus Birkemose 5, Anders Thomsen 4	19
4	Sweden	Fredrik Lindgren 14, Oliver Berntzon 5, Alexander Woentin dnr	19
5	Australia	Max Fricke 12, Jason Doyle 5, Jaimon Lidsey 0	17
6	Great Britain	Robert Lambert 6, Dan Bewley 6, Drew Kemp dnr	12
7	Czech Republic	Václav Milík Jr. 11, Eduard Krčmář 4, Petr Chlupáč 0	11
