= 2020 Speedway Grand Prix of Czech Republic =

Speedway Grand Prix event

- Venue: Markéta Stadium
- Location: Prague (Czech Republic)
- Start date: 18 & 19 September 2020
- Competitors: 16 (2 reserves)

The 2020 FIM Speedway Grand Prix of Czech Republic was the fifth and sixth rounds of the 2020 Speedway Grand Prix season. They took place on 18 & 19 September 2020 at the Markéta Stadium in Prague, Czech Republic. It was the 24th and 25th Speedway Grand Prix of Czech Republic. The calendar of events was severely disrupted by the effects of the COVID-19 pandemic.

Both rounds were won by Bartosz Zmarzlik (his eighth and ninth career Grand Prix wins)

== Results ==
=== Event 1 (18 September) ===
Placing	Rider	1	2	3	4	5	6	7	8	9	10	11	12	13	14	15	16	17	18	19	20	Pts	SF1	SF2	Final	GP Pts
1	(Poland) (4) Bartosz Zmarzlik	3							3				2				1				2	11		3	3	20
2	(United Kingdom) (2) Tai Woffinden	t					2				2				2				2			8		2	2	18
3	(Slovakia) (16) Martin Vaculík				2				1	3						1			3			10	2		1	16
4	(Russia) (5) Emil Sayfutdinov		0			0					3					2					3	8	3		0	14
5	(Sweden) (15) Freddie Lindgren				1			3			1						3	0				8	1			12
6	(Australia) (10) Jason Doyle			2			3						3			3		2				13		x		11
7	(Russia) (8) Artem Laguta		2						2			3			3			3				13	0			10
8	(Denmark) (12) Leon Madsen			3					x		0			3						3		9		x		9
9	(Australia) (9) Max Fricke			1		2						2					2		1			8				8
10	(Poland) (7) Patryk Dudek		3					2					0	2					0			7				7
11	(Denmark) (1) Mikkel Michelsen	2				3				1				0				1				7				6
12	(Poland) (14) Maciej Janowski				3		1					1		1							t	6				5
13	(Denmark) (13) Niels-Kristian Iversen				0	1							1		1					2		5				4
14	(Slovenia) (6) Matej Žagar		1				0			2							e			1		4				3
15	(Sweden) (11) Antonio Lindbäck			0				1		0					0						1	2				2
16	(Czech Republic) (3) Václav Milík Jr.	0						0				e				e				0		0				1
R1	(Czech Republic) (R1) Eduard Krčmář	1																			0	1	R1			
R2	(Czech Republic) (R2) Jan Kvěch								0													0	R2			

m - exclusion for exceeding two minute time allowance • t - exclusion for touching the tapes • x - other exclusion • e - retired or mechanical failure • f - fell • ns - non-starter • nc - non-classify

gate A - inside	gate B	gate C	gate D - outside

=== Event 2 (19 September) ===
Placing	Rider	1	2	3	4	5	6	7	8	9	10	11	12	13	14	15	16	17	18	19	20	Pts	SF1	SF2	Final	GP Pts
1	(Poland) (7) Bartosz Zmarzlik		3					3					3	2					2			13	3		3	20
2	(United Kingdom) (1) Tai Woffinden	3				3				2				1				3				12		2	2	18
3	(Australia) (6) Jason Doyle		1				2			0							3			3		9	2		1	16
4	(Sweden) (11) Freddie Lindgren			3				2		3					2						2	12		3	0	14
5	(Slovakia) (8) Martin Vaculík		2						3			3			0			2				10		1		12
6	(Denmark) (2) Leon Madsen	1					1				2				1				3			8	1			11
7	(Russia) (12) Emil Sayfutdinov			1					1		0			3						2		7		0		10
8	(Poland) (14) Maciej Janowski				3		3					1		0							3	10	e			9
9	(Australia) (4) Max Fricke	2							0				2				2				1	7				8
10	(Slovenia) (16) Matej Žagar				2				2	1						1			1			7				7
11	(Poland) (10) Patryk Dudek			2			0						0			3		1				6				6
12	(Russia) (13) Artem Laguta				0	1							1		3					1		6				5
13	(Sweden) (3) Antonio Lindbäck	0						1				2				2				0		5				4
14	(Denmark) (5) Mikkel Michelsen		0			0					3					0					0	3				3
15	(Denmark) (15) Niels-Kristian Iversen				1			0			1						1	f				3				2
16	(Czech Republic) (9) Václav Milík Jr.			0		2						0					0		ns			2				1
R1	(Czech Republic) (R1) Eduard Krčmář																		0			0	R1			
R2	(Czech Republic) (R2) Jan Kvěch																					0	R2			

m - exclusion for exceeding two minute time allowance • t - exclusion for touching the tapes • x - other exclusion • e - retired or mechanical failure • f - fell • ns - non-starter • nc - non-classify

gate A - inside	gate B	gate C	gate D - outside
