= 2025 Speedway Grand Prix =

31st season of Speedway Grand Pix

Season details
- Dates: 3 May – 13 September
- Events: 10
- Cities: 9
- Countries: 7
- Riders: 15 permanents 1 wild card(s); 2 track reserves
- Heats: 230 (in 10 events)

Winners
- Champion: POL Bartosz Zmarzlik
- Runner-up: AUS Brady Kurtz
- 3rd place: GBR Dan Bewley

The 2025 Speedway Grand Prix season was the 31st season of the Speedway Grand Prix era, and decided the 80th FIM Speedway World Championship. It was the fourth series promoted by Discovery Sports Events.

For the first time Great Britain hosted two rounds of the championship. The original schedule showed the National Speedway Stadium in Manchester joining the flagship Principality Stadium in Cardiff on the calendar, but the Cardiff round was subsequently cancelled and replaced with a second grand prix in Manchester. There were eight other rounds, with Poland's allocation reduced from four to three.

Bartosz Zmarzlik was the defending champion having won the title in 2024. He was aiming to equal Tony Rickardsson and Ivan Mauger's record of six world championships.

The choice of the wildcard riders caused significant controversy due to the fact that 2021 Word Champion Artem Laguta and Emil Sayfutdinov were once again omitted, as was 2022 world runner-up Leon Madsen. The 2025 event was also the fourth consecutive year that Zmarzlik was missing some of his strongest rivals.

The title was won by Zmarzlik, who edged out debutant Brady Kurtz by one point to win a sixth world title. Kurtz created history during the season by winning five consecutive Grand Prix, which was a new record. Britain's Dan Bewley completed the podium, while Fredrik Lindgren, Jack Holder, Andžejs Ļebedevs and Robert Lambert all secured their participation in the 2026 series by finishing in the top seven.

== Qualification ==
For the 2025 season there were 15 permanent riders, who were joined at each Grand Prix by one wild card and two track reserves. The top six riders from the 2024 championship qualified automatically. These riders were joined by the four riders who qualified via the Grand Prix Challenge and the 2024 Speedway European Championship winner. The final four riders were nominated by the SGP Commission.

=== Qualified riders ===
#	Riders	2024 place	GP Ch place	Permanent rider appearance	Previous appearances in series
95	(Poland) Bartosz Zmarzlik	1	—	10th	2012–2015, 2016–2024
505	(United Kingdom) Robert Lambert	2	—	5th	2015, 2018–2019, 2021–2024
66	(Sweden) Fredrik Lindgren	3	—	16th	2004, 2006–2007, 2008–2014, 2016, 2017–2024
99	(United Kingdom) Dan Bewley	4	—	4th	2018, 2022–2024
54	(Slovakia) Martin Vaculík	5	—	10th	2012, 2013, 2017–2024
25	(Australia) Jack Holder	6	—	4th	2016, 2020, 2022–2024
29	(Latvia) Andžejs Ļebedevs	10	—	2nd	2013–2014, 2022–2023, 2024
101	(Australia) Brady Kurtz	—	1	1st	2016, 2017
105	(Denmark) Anders Thomsen	21	2	4th	2016, 2020, 2021–2023, 2024
415	(Poland) Dominik Kubera	8	3	2nd	2021, 2023, 2024
46	(Australia) Max Fricke	11	4	5th	2016–2017, 2019, 2020–2023, 2024
155	(Denmark) Mikkel Michelsen	7	—	5th	2015, 2018–2019, 2020, 2021, 2022–2024
744	(Germany) Kai Huckenbeck	12	13	2nd	2017–2019, 2022–2023, 2024
201	(Czech Republic) Jan Kvěch	15	9	2nd	2020–2023, 2024
69	(Australia) Jason Doyle	16	—	11th	2015–2024

=== Qualified substitutes ===
The following riders were nominated as substitutes:

#	Riders	2024 place	GP Ch place
30	(Denmark) Leon Madsen	9	—
692	(Poland) Patryk Dudek	17	11
108	(United Kingdom) Tai Woffinden	18	—
24	(Sweden) Jacob Thorssell	—	5
22	(United States) Luke Becker	—	—
96	(France) Dimitri Bergé	—	—
TBC	(Poland) Wiktor Przyjemski	—	—
785	(Ukraine) Nazar Parnitskyi	—	—
999	(Norway) Mathias Pollestad	—	—

== Calendar ==
The 2025 season consisted of 10 events.

Round	Date	City and venue	Winner	Runner-up	3rd placed	4th placed	Results
1	3 May	(Germany) Landshut, Germany; Ellermühle Speedway Stadium	(Poland) Bartosz Zmarzlik	(United Kingdom) Dan Bewley	(Latvia) Andžejs Ļebedevs	(Australia) Brady Kurtz	results
2	17 May	(Poland) Warsaw, Poland; Stadion Narodowy	(Australia) Jack Holder	(Australia) Brady Kurtz	(Poland) Patryk Dudek	(Poland) Dominik Kubera	results
3	31 May	(Czech Republic) Prague, Czech Republic; Markéta Stadium	(Poland) Bartosz Zmarzlik	(Sweden) Fredrik Lindgren	(Denmark) Leon Madsen	(Australia) Jack Holder	results
4	13 June	(United Kingdom) Manchester, Great Britain; National Speedway Stadium	(United Kingdom) Dan Bewley	(Poland) Bartosz Zmarzlik	(Australia) Brady Kurtz	(Sweden) Fredrik Lindgren	results
5	14 June	(United Kingdom) Manchester, Great Britain; National Speedway Stadium	(Poland) Bartosz Zmarzlik	(Australia) Brady Kurtz	(Sweden) Fredrik Lindgren	(Australia) Jack Holder	results
6	21 June	(Poland) Gorzów, Poland; Edward Jancarz Stadium	(Australia) Brady Kurtz	(Poland) Bartosz Zmarzlik	(United Kingdom) Dan Bewley	(Sweden) Fredrik Lindgren	results
7	5 July	(Sweden) Målilla, Sweden; Skrotfrag Arena	(Australia) Brady Kurtz	(Poland) Bartosz Zmarzlik	(Latvia) Andžejs Ļebedevs	(Australia) Jason Doyle	results
8	2 August	(Latvia) Riga, Latvia; Riga Speedway Stadium	(Australia) Brady Kurtz	(Sweden) Fredrik Lindgren	(United Kingdom) Dan Bewley	(Poland) Bartosz Zmarzlik	results
9	30 August	(Poland) Wrocław, Poland; Olympic Stadium	(Australia) Brady Kurtz	(Poland) Bartosz Zmarzlik	(United Kingdom) Dan Bewley	(Australia) Jack Holder	results
10	13 September	(Denmark) Vojens, Denmark; Vojens Speedway Center	(Australia) Brady Kurtz	(Poland) Bartosz Zmarzlik	(Denmark) Michael Jepsen Jensen	(United Kingdom) Dan Bewley	results

== Final classification ==
Qualifies for next season's Grand Prix series
Full-time Grand Prix rider
Wild card, track reserve or qualified reserve

Pos.	Rider	Points	GER (Germany)	POL (Poland)	CZE (Czech Republic)	GBR (United Kingdom)	GBR (United Kingdom)	POL (Poland)	SWE (Sweden)	LAT (Latvia)	POL (Poland)	DEN (Denmark)
Gold	(Poland) (95) Bartosz Zmarzlik (C)	183	24	9	20	20	20	20	18	14	20	18
Silver	(Australia) (101) Brady Kurtz	182	17	21	7	19	18	20	20	20	20	20
Bronze	(United Kingdom) (99) Dan Bewley	142	18	5	11	20	7	20	16	11	20	14
4	(Sweden) (66) Fredrik Lindgren	134	12	10	18	14	16	17	12	18	6	11
5	(Australia) (25) Jack Holder	118	8	20	14	12	14	9	9	12	14	6
6	(Latvia) (29) Andžejs Ļebedevs	98	17	12	12	1	4	5	8	16	11	12
7	(United Kingdom) (505) Robert Lambert	82	11	13	3	11	5	4	10	10	5	10
8	(Australia) (46) Max Fricke	79	10	8	4	12	12	10	3	8	8	4
9	(Denmark) (155) Mikkel Michelsen	70	4	6	6	9	9	9	5	4	10	8
10	(Australia) (69) Jason Doyle	66	3	5	–	3	2	12	14	6	12	9
11	(Denmark) (105) Anders Thomsen	66	7	7	10	2	6	11	2	9	9	3
12	(Poland) (415) Dominik Kubera	61	11	14	2	4	8	6	6	7	1	2
13	(Czech Republic) (201) Jan Kvěch	58	5	7	9	7	3	7	11	3	5	1
14	(Slovakia) (54) Martin Vaculík	51	6	2	8	11	11	0	1	2	3	7
15	(Germany) (744) Kai Huckenbeck	42	1	1	5	5	10	3	7	1	4	5
16	(Poland) (16) Patryk Dudek	16	–	16	–	–	–	–	–	–	–	–
17	(Denmark) (30) Leon Madsen	16	–	–	16	–	–	–	–	–	–	–
18	(Denmark) (16) Michael Jepsen Jensen	16	–	–	–	–	–	–	–	–	–	16
19	(Poland) (16) Maciej Janowski	8	–	–	–	–	–	–	–	–	8	–
20	(United Kingdom) (16) Charles Wright	7	–	–	–	6	1	–	–	–	–	–
21	(Latvia) (16) Jevgeņijs Kostigovs	5	–	–	–	–	–	–	–	5	–	–
22	(Sweden) (16) Kim Nilsson	4	–	–	–	–	–	–	4	–	–	–
23	(Germany) (16) Erik Riss	2	2	–	–	–	–	–	–	–	–	–
24	(Poland) (16) Oskar Paluch	2	–	–	–	–	–	2	–	–	–	–
25	(Czech Republic) (16) Daniel Klíma	1	–	–	1	–	–	–	–	–	–	–
26	(Poland) (17) Bartłomiej Kowalski	1	–	0	–	–	–	1	–	–	–	–
27	(Poland) (17) Mateusz Cierniak	0	–	0	–	–	–	–	–	–	–	–
28	(Poland) (18) Kevin Małkiewicz	0	–	–	–	–	–	0	–	–	–	–
29	(Sweden) (17) Rasmus Karlsson	0	–	–	–	–	–	–	0	–	–	–
30	(Sweden) (18) Sammy Van Dyck	0	–	–	–	–	–	–	0	–	–	–
31	(Denmark) (17) Jonas Knudsen	0	–	–	–	–	–	–	–	–	–	0
Pos.	Rider	Points	GER (Germany)	POL (Poland)	CZE (Czech Republic)	GBR (United Kingdom)	GBR (United Kingdom)	POL (Poland)	SWE (Sweden)	LAT (Latvia)	POL (Poland)	DEN (Denmark)
