= Speedway Grand Prix of Czech Republic =

World speedway event

FIM Czech Republic Speedway Grand Prix
- Stadium: Markéta Stadium, Prague
- Years: 29 (1997–present)
- Track: Speedway track
- Track Length: 353 m

Last Event (season 2025)
- Date: 31 May 2025
- Winner: (Poland) Bartosz Zmarzlik

The Speedway Grand Prix of Czech Republic is a speedway event that is a part of the Speedway Grand Prix Series. The first event took place in 1997.

== Winners ==
	Season	City	Stadium	Winner
1	1997	Prague	Markéta Stadium	(United States) Greg Hancock	result
2	1998	Prague	Markéta Stadium	(Sweden) Tony Rickardsson	result
3	1999	Prague	Markéta Stadium	(Poland) Tomasz Gollob	result
4	2000	Prague	Markéta Stadium	(United States) Billy Hamill	result
5	2001	Prague	Markéta Stadium	(United States) Billy Hamill	result
6	2002	Prague	Markéta Stadium	(Australia) Jason Crump	result
7	2003	Prague	Markéta Stadium	(Australia) Jason Crump	result
8	2004	Prague	Markéta Stadium	(Australia) Jason Crump	result
9	2005	Prague	Markéta Stadium	(Sweden) Tony Rickardsson	result
10	2006	Prague	Markéta Stadium	(Denmark) Hans Andersen	result
11	2007	Prague	Markéta Stadium	(Denmark) Nicki Pedersen	result
12	2008	Prague	Markéta Stadium	(Denmark) Nicki Pedersen	result
13	2009	Prague	Markéta Stadium	(Russia) Emil Sayfutdinov	result
14	2010	Prague	Markéta Stadium	(Poland) Tomasz Gollob	result
15	2011	Prague	Markéta Stadium	(United States) Greg Hancock	result
16	2012	Prague	Markéta Stadium	(Denmark) Nicki Pedersen	result
17	2013	Prague	Markéta Stadium	(England) Tai Woffinden	result
18	2014	Prague	Markéta Stadium	(England) Tai Woffinden	result
19	2015	Prague	Markéta Stadium	(England) Tai Woffinden	result
20	2016	Prague	Markéta Stadium	(Australia) Jason Doyle	result
21	2017	Prague	Markéta Stadium	(Australia) Jason Doyle	result
22	2018	Prague	Markéta Stadium	(Sweden) Fredrik Lindgren	result
23	2019	Prague	Markéta Stadium	(Poland) Janusz Kołodziej	result
24	2020	Prague	Markéta Stadium	(Poland) Bartosz Zmarzlik	result
25	2020	Prague	Markéta Stadium	(Poland) Bartosz Zmarzlik	result
26	2021	Prague	Markéta Stadium	(Poland) Maciej Janowski	result
27	2021	Prague	Markéta Stadium	(Russia) Artem Laguta	result
28	2022	Prague	Markéta Stadium	(Slovakia) Martin Vaculík	result
29	2023	Prague	Markéta Stadium	(Slovakia) Martin Vaculík	result
30	2024	Prague	Markéta Stadium	(Slovakia) Martin Vaculík	result
31	2025	Prague	Markéta Stadium	(Poland) Bartosz Zmarzlik	result

== Most wins ==
- (Australia) Jason Crump 3 times
- (Denmark) Nicki Pedersen 3 times
- (England) Tai Woffinden 3 times
- (Slovakia) Martin Vaculík 3 times
- (Poland) Bartosz Zmarzlik 3 times
