= Brady Kurtz =

Australian speedway rider

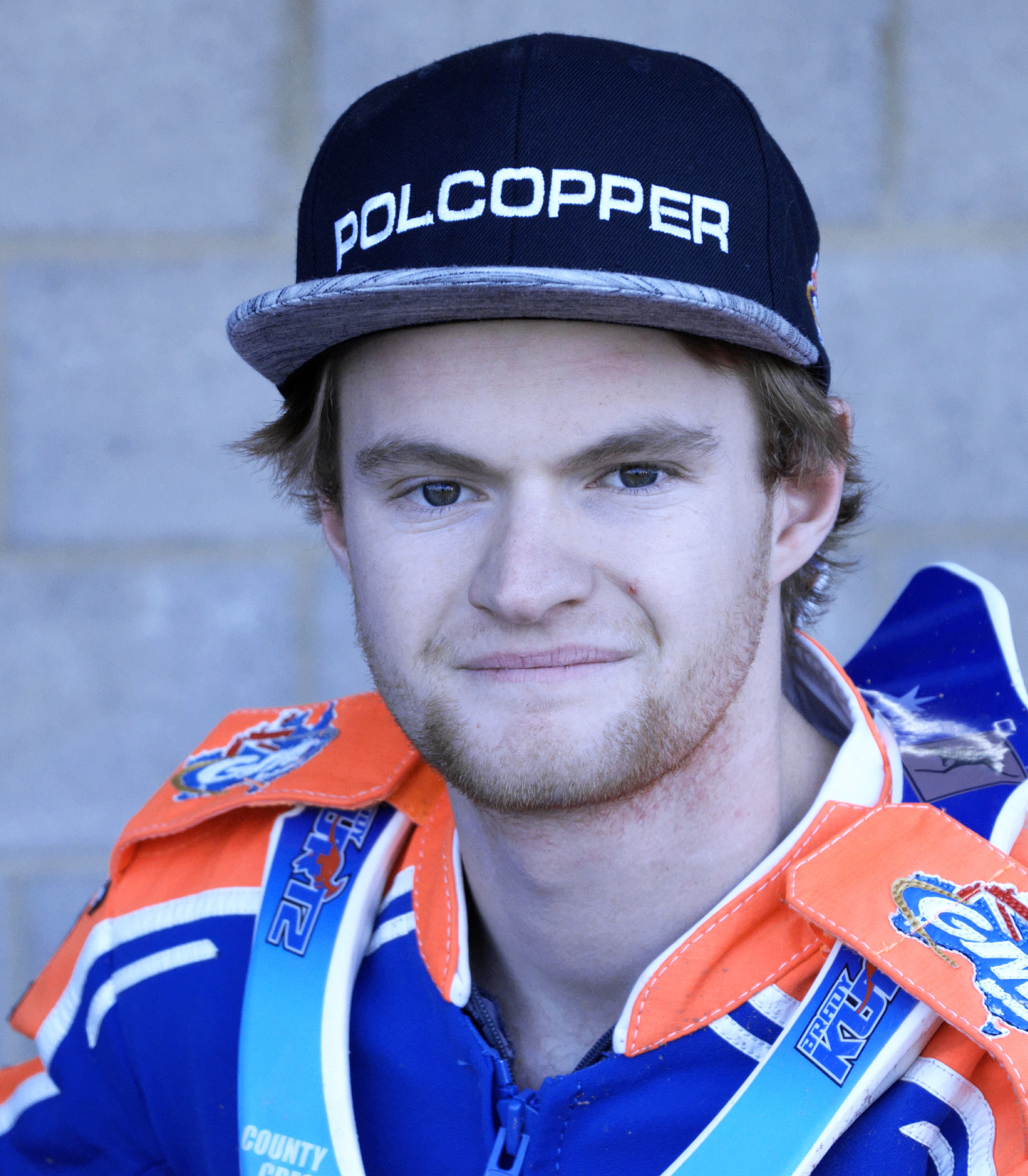
- Kurtz in 2019
- Born: 27 September 1996 (age 30); Cowra, New South Wales; Australia

Career history

Great Britain
- 2014–2015: Somerset Rebels
- 2016: Plymouth Devils
- 2016–2019: Poole Pirates
- 2020–2026: Belle Vue Aces

Sweden
- 2019–2021: Vetlanda
- 2022–2024: Dackarna

Poland
- 2016–2017: Piła
- 2017, 2023–2024: Rybnik
- 2018–2020: Leszno
- 2018–2019: Rawicz
- 2020–2022: Łódź
- 2025–2026: Wrocław

Denmark
- 2016: Esbjerg
- 2013, 2021, 2026: Holsted

Speedway Grand Prix statistics
- SGP number: 101
- Starts: 22
- Finalist: 17 times
- Winner: 6 times

Individual honours
- 2025: World Championship runner-up
- 2016, 2025: Australian Champion
- 2013/14, 2014/15: NSW State Champion
- 2026: Ekstraliga Riders’ Champion

Team honours
- 2025, 2026: World team champion
- 2022, 2024: British champions
- 2023: Premiership Pairs
- 2023: Swedish Eliserien champion
- 2015: British Div 2 KO Cup
- 2014: Premier Shield
- 2014: British Div 2 Fours

Brady Kurtz (born 27 September 1996) is a motorcycle speedway rider from Australia.

== Biography ==
Born in Cowra, New South Wales. Brady's older brother Todd Kurtz is a fellow speedway rider.

Kurtz got his first break into British speedway riding in the Premier League with the Somerset Rebels. He was part of the Somerset team that won the Premier League Four-Team Championship, which was held on 3 August 2014, at the East of England Arena.

After two impressive years with the Rebels, Kurtz was named in the Poole Pirates team to compete in the 2016 Elite League. This news didn't come as a surprise, as Kurtz had already been the subject of interest from Poole for some time. The Poole promoter Matt Ford had gone on record lauding Kurtz as an "outstanding talent" that "every single club wants to snap up as an asset". Kurtz said of his future team "I have been looking up to the Poole Pirates since I was seven years old and used to watch them on TV all the time. To have Matt Ford looking at me and saying those things is like a dream come true." Kurtz doubled up with Plymouth Devils and was part of the Plymouth team (with his brother) that won the Premier League Four-Team Championship, which was held on 23 and 24 July 2016, at the East of England Arena.

Kurtz was the 2016 Australian Champion having won the 4 round series in January 2016. He is taking part in the qualifying rounds for Grand Prix entry.

In 2020, Kurtz signed for the Belle Vue Aces in the SGB Premiership. In 2022, he captained Belle Vue to the league title during the SGB Premiership 2022.

In 2023, Kurtz re-signed for Belle Vue again for the SGB Premiership 2023. Kurtz along with Dan Bewley and Jake Mulford won the Premiership Pairs for Belle Vue in June 2023.

In 2024, Kurtz captained Belle Vue for their title winning season and helped Australia secure a silver medal at the 2024 Speedway of Nations on his home track in Manchester. Kurtz ended his season in style by winning the 2025 GP Challenge and subsequently qualifying for the 2025 Speedway Grand Prix.

Kurtz's 2025 season started with success as he secured a second Australian national title. He won the opening two rounds and finished 11 points clear of Jack Holder. He continued his impressive season as he won his maiden Grand Prix, when winning the Gorzów Grand Prix and then followed this up with four more successive wins in Målilla, Riga, Wrocław and Vojens respectively. Despite setting a new record of winning five consecutive Grand Prix races, he finished one point behind Bartosz Zmarzlik to finish as world championship runner-up. He finished his season on a high, winning the 2025 Speedway of Nations (the World team championship).

== Major results ==
=== World individual Championship ===
- 2016 Speedway Grand Prix – 28th (2 pts)
- 2017 Speedway Grand Prix – 31st (3 pts)
- 2025 Speedway Grand Prix – 2nd (182 pts)
- 2026 Speedway Grand Prix – 3rd (157 pts)

=== Grand Prix wins ===
- 1: 2025 Speedway Grand Prix of Gorzów
- 2: 2025 Speedway Grand Prix of Sweden
- 3: 2025 Speedway Grand Prix of Latvia
- 4: 2025 Speedway Grand Prix of Wrocław
- 5: 2025 Speedway Grand Prix of Denmark
- 6: 2026 Speedway Grand Prix of Great Britain (Manchester R4)

=== World team Championships ===
- 2024 Speedway of Nations – 2nd
- 2025 Speedway of Nations – Champion
- 2026 Speedway World Cup – Champion

=== Under-21 Speedway World Cup ===
- 2015 - (Australia) Mildura, Olympic Park Speedway - 3rd - 29pts (7)
- 2016 - (Sweden) Norrköping, Norrköping Motorstadion - 2nd - 37pts (7)
