= Riga Speedway Stadium =

Stadium in Riga, Latvia

Riga Speedway Stadium Biķernieki Speedway Stadium
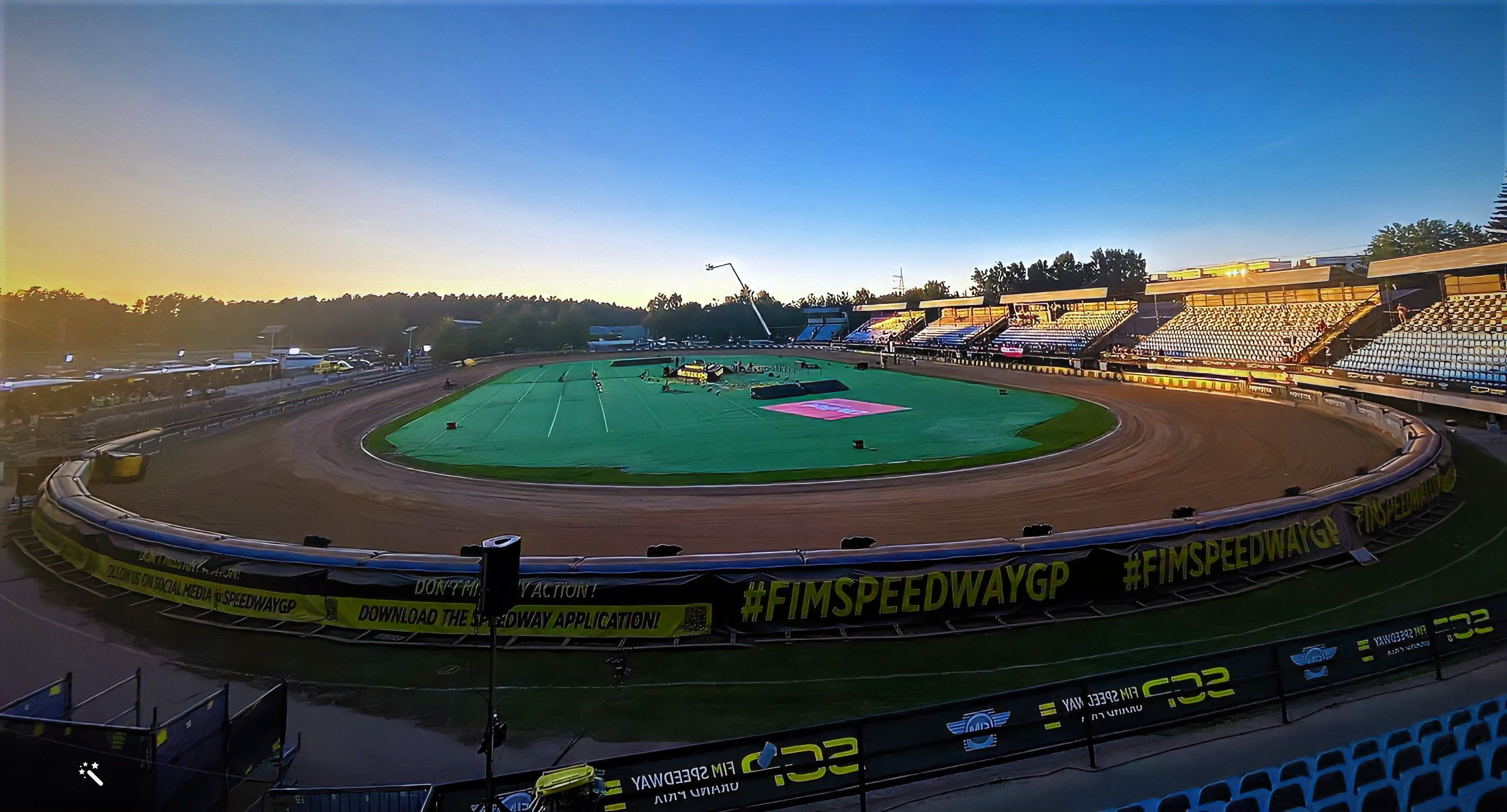
- The stadium ready for the 2023 Speedway Grand Prix of Latvia
- Location: Sergeja Eizenšteina iela 2, Vidzemes priekšpilsēta, Riga, LV-1079, Latvia
- Coordinates: 56°57′54″N 24°13′52″E
- Operator: Motorcycle speedway
- Opened: 1976 (reopened 2014)

The Riga Speedway Stadium or the Biķernieki Speedway Stadium is a multi-use stadium in the eastern part of Riga, Latvia. The stadium is the venue for the World Championship round known as the Speedway Grand Prix of Latvia and the Team Speedway Under-21 World Championship.

The speedway track which is adjacent to the Biķernieki Complex Sports Base was first constructed in 1976 and held several editions of the Soviet Union Speedway Championship before falling into disrepair. However, in 2014 the track was renovated and has even hosted a drift race car meeting that normally tales place on the larger adjacent circuit.

In 2023, the venue hosted both the Speedway Grand Prix of Latvia and the 2023 Speedway of Nations 2. It has since continued to host the world championship round in 2024 and 2025.

== See also ==
- Speedway Grand Prix of Latvia
