= National Speedway Stadium =

Stadium in Manchester, England

The National Speedway Stadium
- Belle Vue
- Interactive map of The National Speedway Stadium
- Location: Kirkmanshulme Lane, Gorton, Manchester, United Kingdom
- Coordinates: 53.46105°N 2.18891°W
- Capacity: 3,700 (seated); 6,500 total (temp stands)

Construction
- Groundbreaking: 2015
- Built: 2015–16
- Opened: 2016

Tenants
- Belle Vue Aces (2016–present); Belle Vue Colts (2016–2025); Manchester Titans (2017–present)

The National Speedway Stadium is a multi-purpose stadium on Kirkmanshulme Lane, in Gorton, Manchester, England, and is the home of the Belle Vue Aces and Belle Vue Colts speedway teams and the Manchester Titans American football team.

== Origins and opening ==
In 2007, Chris Morton and David Gordon proposed that a new stadium should be built that could be used as the home for the Belle Vue Aces and be used as a national speedway stadium. Seven years later in September 2014, the planning application for the stadium was approved by Manchester City Council. The planned site on Kirkmanshulme Lane was previously a grassed area containing hockey pitches.

Construction on the National Speedway Stadium started in October 2014 and it opened in March 2016 as part of the Belle Vue's £11 million regeneration scheme. The new stadium was built close to (separated only by synthetic hockey pitches) the former Belle Vue Stadium, which closed in 2020 and is now a site for planned housing.

== History ==
In 2016, the stadium hosted the Race-Off and Final of the Speedway World Cup. It was won by Poland, with Great Britain coming second.

In 2021, the stadium hosted the 2021 Speedway of Nations grand final, which was won by Great Britain. In 2024, the stadium hosted the 2024 Speedway of Nations and Speedway of Nations 2. In 2025, it hosted a round of the Speedway Grand Prix for the first time.
