= Dan Bewley =

British speedway rider

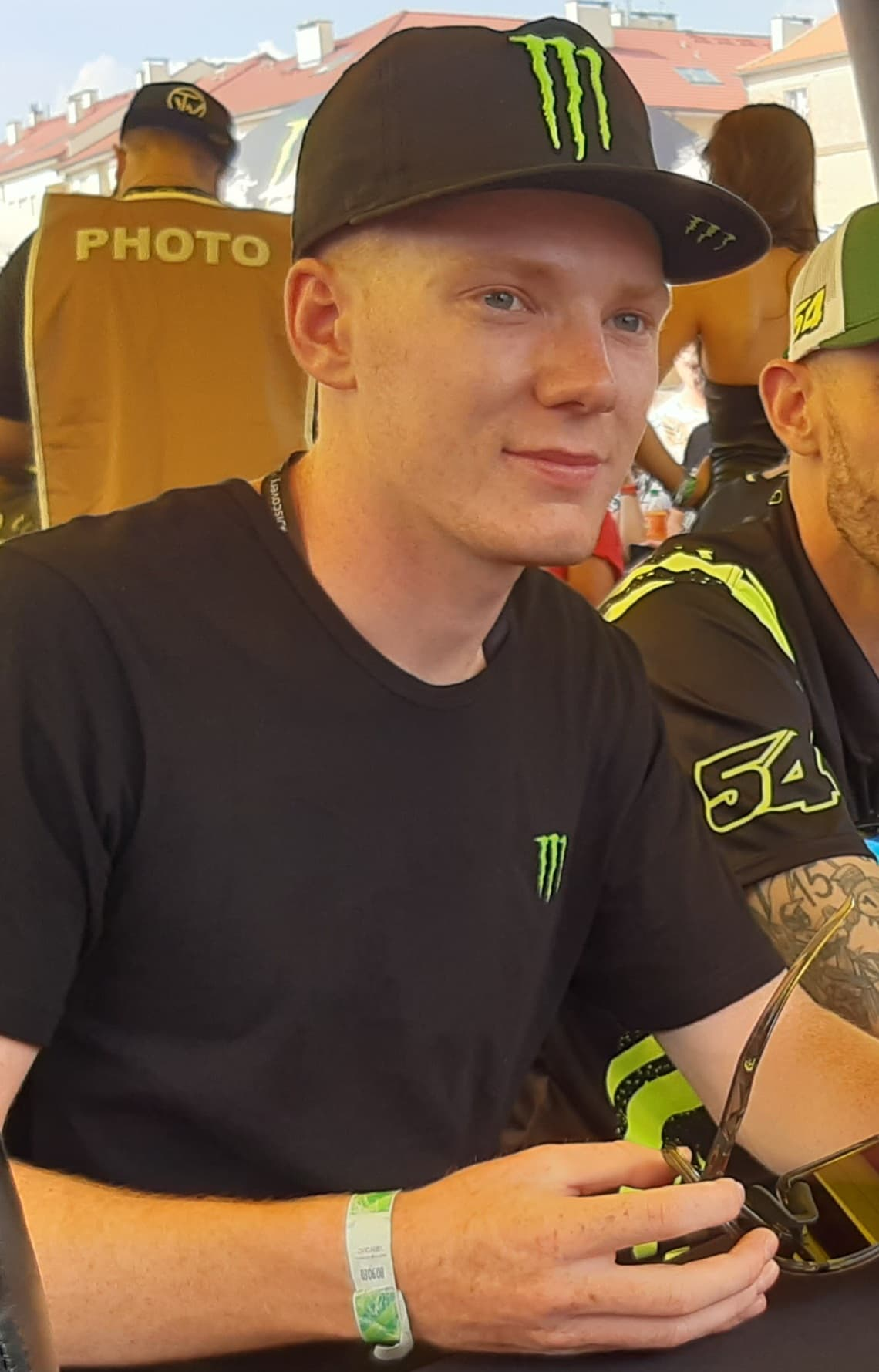
- Born: 20 May 1999 (age 27); Maryport, Cumbria, England
- Nationality: British (English)

Career history

Great Britain
- 2016: Edinburgh
- 2017: Glasgow
- 2016–2021, 2023–2026: Belle Vue
- 2018: Workington
- 2027: Ipswich

Poland
- 2018–2019: Rybnik
- 2020–2027: Wrocław

Sweden
- 2019–2020: Rospiggarna
- 2022: Smederna
- 2023–2024: Dackarna

Speedway Grand Prix statistics
- SGP number: 99
- Starts: 45
- Finalist: 13 times
- Winner: 5 times

Individual honours
- 2025: World Championship bronze
- 2022, 2023, 2024: British Champion
- 2017: National League Riders' Champion
- 2020: British U21 Champion
- 2018: British U19 Champion
- 2022: Golden Helmet of Pardubice
- 2020: South Australian Champion

Team honours
- 2021, 2024: World team champion
- 2023: Premiership Pairs
- 2024: British Premiership champion
- 2023: Swedish Eliserien champion

Daniel Bewley (born 20 May 1999) is a British international speedway rider.

== Career ==
Bewley started riding for the Belle Vue Colts and as a reserve for the Edinburgh Monarchs in 2016. In 2017, he won the National League Riders' Championship before being promoted to the senior side (Belle Vue Aces) in 2017. The same year he won the 2017 Conference League Riders' Championship.

In 2018, Bewley finished runner-up to Robert Lambert in the British Speedway Championship, won the British Under-19 Final and claimed a third place in the second round of the World Under 21 Championship series in Poland.

In 2020, Bewley won the British Speedway Under 21 Championship and became a member of the British Speedway team. In 2021, he finished runner-up again in the 2021 British Speedway Championship.

In 2021, Bewley became a world champion after Great Britain secured the 2021 Speedway of Nations (the world team title).

In August 2022, Bewley won back-to-back SGPs in Cardiff and Wroclaw. In September 2022, he became the British champion after winning the 2022 British Speedway Championship with a 15 point maximum from his five rides. Bewley ended the 2022 season with a sixth place finish during the 2022 Speedway World Championship, after securing 102 points during the 2022 Speedway Grand Prix. The top six place finish automatically qualified him for the 2023 Speedway Grand Prix. He helped Smederna win the Swedish Speedway Team Championship during the 2022 campaign.

In 2023, Bewley returned to ride for Belle Vue for the SGB Premiership 2023. Bewley along with Brady Kurtz and Jake Mulford won the Premiership Pairs for Belle Vue in June 2023. In the World Championship, he won his third Grand Prix, winning the Swedish Grand Prix on 15 July, finishing seventh in the World Championship standings and ensure his place in the 2024 Speedway Grand Prix. Also in July 2023, he was part of the British team that won the silver medal in the 2023 Speedway World Cup final. He successfully defended his British crown, when winning the 2023 British Speedway Championship.

Bewley re-signed for Belle Vue for their league winning 2024 season. Also in 2024, Bewley helped Great Britain secure the 2024 Speedway of Nations on his home track in Manchester, which was his second world team title. He then won his fourth Grand Prix in August after winning the 2024 Speedway Grand Prix of Great Britain.

In June 2025, Bewley won his fifth career Grand Prix on his home track during the British Grand Prix and finished the season by taking the bronze medal in the World Championship.

For the 2027 SGB Premiership season, Bewley joined Ipswich Witches.

== Major results ==
=== World individual Championship ===
- 2022 Speedway Grand Prix – 6th (102 pts)
- 2023 Speedway Grand Prix – 7th (104 pts)
- 2024 Speedway Grand Prix – 4th (127 pts)
- 2025 Speedway Grand Prix – 3rd (142 pts)
- 2026 Speedway Grand Prix – 16th (31 pts)

=== Grand Prix wins ===
- 1: 2022 Speedway Grand Prix of Great Britain
- 2: 2022 Speedway Grand Prix of Poland (Wrocław)
- 3: 2023 Speedway Grand Prix of Sweden
- 4: 2024 Speedway Grand Prix of Great Britain (Cardiff)
- 5: 2025 Speedway Grand Prix of Great Britain (Manchester R4)

=== World team Championships ===
- 2020 Speedway of Nations – 6th
- 2021 Speedway of Nations – Champion
- 2022 Speedway of Nations – 2nd
- 2023 Speedway World Cup – 2nd
- 2024 Speedway of Nations – Champion
