= Jack Holder =

Australian speedway rider (born 1996)

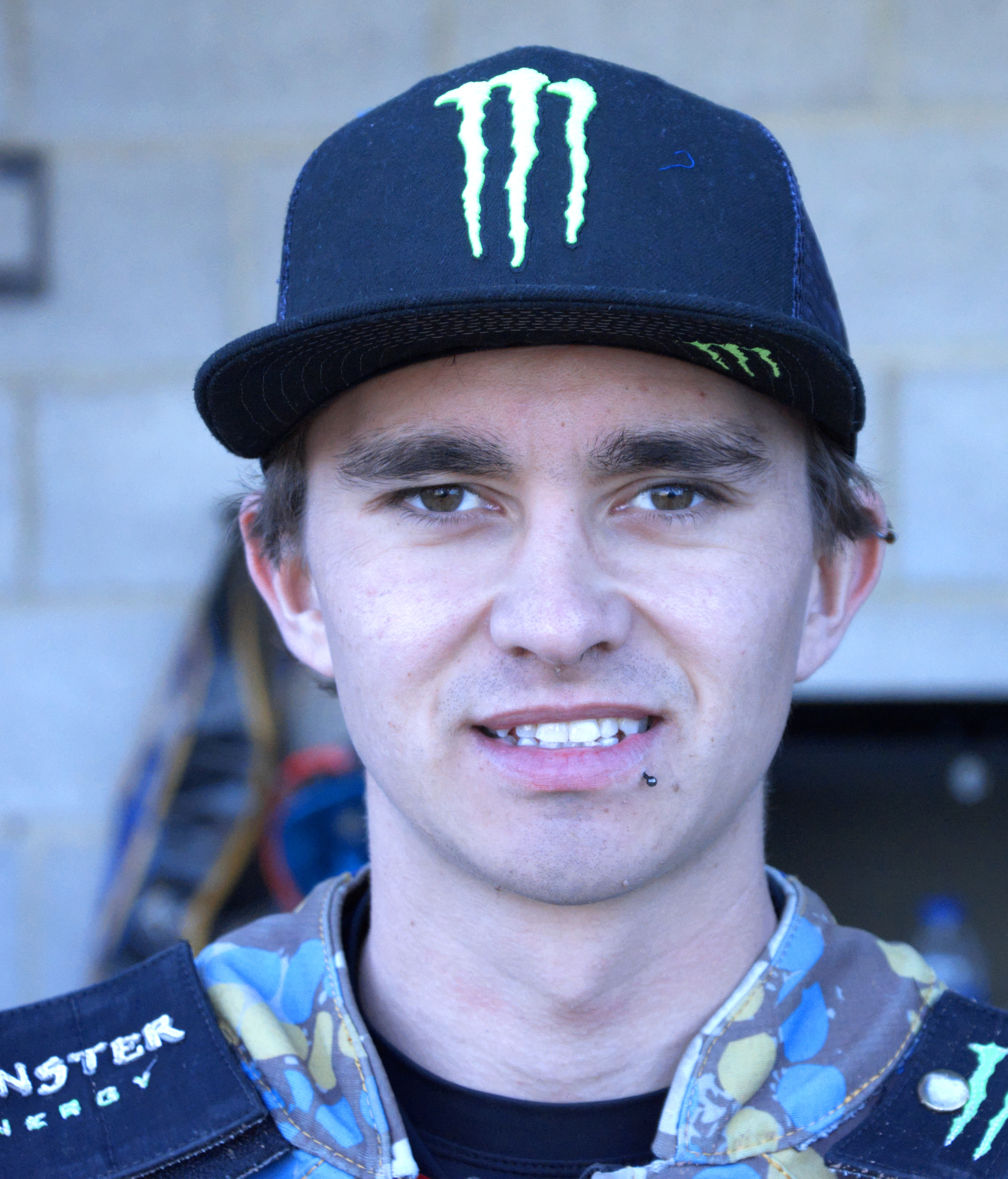
- Born: 23 March 1996 (age 30); Appin, New South Wales, Australia
- Nationality: Australian

Career history

Great Britain
- 2015–2016: Plymouth Devils
- 2017: Peterborough Panthers
- 2017, 2019: Poole Pirates
- 2018: Somerset Rebels
- 2020–2026: Sheffield Tigers

Poland
- 2018–2022: Toruń
- 2020, 2026: Gorzów
- 2023–2025: Lublin

Sweden
- 2019, 2023: Västervik

Speedway Grand Prix statistics
- SGP number: 25
- Starts: 48
- Finalist: 14 times
- Winner: 2 times

Individual honours
- 2023, 2026: Australian Championship
- 2016: Australian Under-21 Champion
- 2019, 2020, 2021, 2022, 2023, 2025: NSW champion
- 2019: Victorian State Champion

Team honours
- 2022, 2025: World team champion
- 2023: British champions
- 2016: Fours Champions
- 2018, 2024: British KO Cup
- 2022: UK League Cup
- 2023, 2024: Polish champions

Jack Holder (born 23 March 1996) is an Australian motorcycle speedway rider. He is a World team champion and his brother Chris Holder is a former World individual champion.

== Career ==
A successful rider in Australia, Holder came to England and first rode for Plymouth Devils in 2015. He was part of the Plymouth team that won the Premier League Four-Team Championship, which was held on 23 and 24 July 2016, at the East of England Arena.

After two seasons, Holder rode for both Peterborough Panthers and Poole Pirates in 2017, helping Poole to win the Elite Shield.

Holder finished in sixth place at the 2017 Speedway Under-21 World Championship and fourth in the Jason Crump Classic Cup - considered a warm-up for the Australian Senior Solo Championship. The Boxing Day event (2018) was held in front of more than 2,500 fans and he rode through to the B Final where he beat Jye Etheridge, Mason Campton and Erik Riss and went through to the A Final. However, he finished at the back, while the race was won by older brother Chris Holder. In 2018, he helped Somerset Rebels win the KO Cup.

In 2019, Holder started the season as number 1 for Poole Pirates but had a shaky start, and his friend and co-rider Brady Kurtz asked fans to be patient while he settled in. “I am sure Jack’s copped enough off social media and everything. He doesn’t need me asking him about it as well. Everyone just needs to let him get on with it – he’s just a kid, let him race his bike!"

In 2021 and 2022, Holder rode for the Sheffield Tigers in the SGB Premiership 2021 and SGB Premiership 2022. He helped Sheffield win the 2022 League cup and reach the Play off final.

Also in 2022, Holder competed in every round of the 2022 Speedway Grand Prix and scored 12 points at the British Grand Prix, he eventually finished in 12th place during the 2022 Speedway World Championship, after securing 67 points. He qualified for the 2023 Speedway Grand Prix by virtue of finishing 3rd in the 2023 Speedway Grand Prix Qualification. However, the highlight of his season was winning the 2022 Speedway of Nations for Australia with Max Fricke. In December, he won his fifth successive New South Wales Individual Speedway Championship.

In January 2023, Holder won the Australian Championship for the first time. In 2023, he was part of the Australian team that finished fourth in the 2023 Speedway World Cup final. He completed a career best finish of fourth in the 2023 Speedway Grand Prix but would have finished even higher had it not been for a hand injury suffered during the Swedish round, which forced him to sit out the Latvian round. On the domestic front, he helped Sheffield win the 2023 league title

After re-signing for Sheffield for 2024 Holder recorded the first Grand Prix win of his career, winning the opening round in Croatia. In 2024, he also helped Australia secure a silver medal at the 2024 Speedway of Nations in Manchester and won the Knockout Cup with Sheffield. Also in 2024, he helped Lublin win the Ekstraliga during the 2024 Polish speedway season and won the NSW title for the sixth successive year.

In 2025, Holder won a second Grand Prix and finished fifth in the World Championship. He finished his season on a high, winning the 2025 Speedway of Nations (his second World team championship). Holder won the Australian title for the second time after claiming all four rounds.

== Major results ==
=== World individual Championship ===
- 2016 Speedway Grand Prix – 29th (2 pts)
- 2020 Speedway Grand Prix – 17th (12 pts)
- 2022 Speedway Grand Prix – 12th (67 pts)
- 2023 Speedway Grand Prix – 4th (123 pts)
- 2024 Speedway Grand Prix – 6th (106 pts)
- 2025 Speedway Grand Prix – 5th (118 pts)
- 2026 Speedway Grand Prix – 12th (55 pts)

=== Grand Prix wins ===
- 1: 2024 Speedway Grand Prix of Croatia
- 2: 2025 Speedway Grand Prix of Poland (Warsaw)

=== World team Championships ===
- 2022 Speedway of Nations – Champion
- 2023 Speedway World Cup – 4th
- 2024 Speedway of Nations – 2nd
- 2025 Speedway of Nations – Champion
