= Bartosz Zmarzlik =

Polish speedway rider (born 1995)

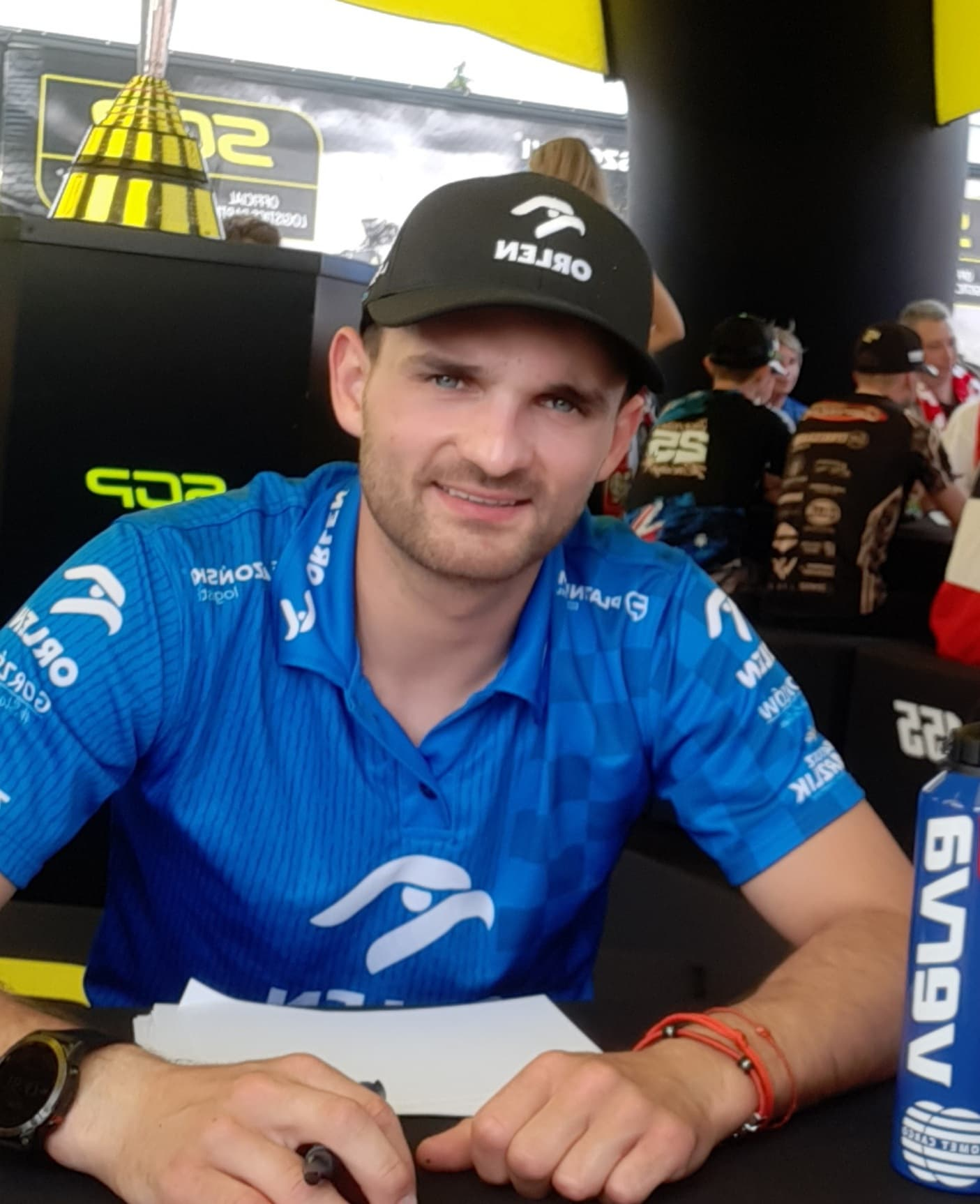
- Zmarzlik in 2022
- Born: 12 April 1995 (age 31); Szczecin, Poland
- Nationality: Polish
- Website: official website

Career history

Poland
- 2010–2022: Gorzów
- 2023–2026: Lublin

Sweden
- 2011–2012: Gnistorna
- 2013–2021: Vetlanda
- 2022–2026: Lejonen

Denmark
- 2012: Holsted
- 2019: Slangerup

Great Britain
- 2014: Birmingham

Speedway Grand Prix statistics
- SGP number: 95
- Starts: 117
- Finalist: 79 times
- Winner: 31 times

Individual honours
- 2019, 2020, 2022, 2023, 2024, 2025: World Champion
- 2015: World Under-21 Champion
- 2021, 2022, 2023: Polish Champion
- 2015: GP Challenge winner

Team honours
- 2016, 2017, 2023: World Team champion
- 2022, 2023, 2024, 2025: European Team champion
- 2012, 2014, 2015: Team Speedway Junior World Championship
- 2014, 2016, 2023, 2024: Polish Champion
- 2014, 2015, 2024: Elitserien League Champion
- 2014, 2017, 2023, 2024, 2025, 2026: Polish Pairs Champion Sports career
Medal record
Representing Poland
Speedway World Championship
Gold medal – first place	2019
Gold medal – first place	2020
Gold medal – first place	2022
Gold medal – first place	2023
Gold medal – first place	2024
Gold medal – first place	2025
Silver medal – second place	2018
Silver medal – second place	2021
Silver medal – second place	2026
Bronze medal – third place	2016

Bartosz Zmarzlik (Polish: ['bartɔʂ ˈzmarzlik]; born 12 April 1995) is a Polish motorcycle speedway rider, a record-equalling six-time World Champion (2019, 2020, 2022, 2023, 2024 and 2025), three-time World Team Champion (2016, 2017, 2023), World Junior Champion (2015) and European Junior Champion (2012). He is the third Polish rider in history, after Jerzy Szczakiel and Tomasz Gollob, to win an individual World Championship title.

Zmarzlik was awarded the Order of Polonia Restituta, V class in 2019 and won the Polish Sports Personality of the Year title in 2020 becoming the second speedway rider to accomplish this feat.

== Life and career ==
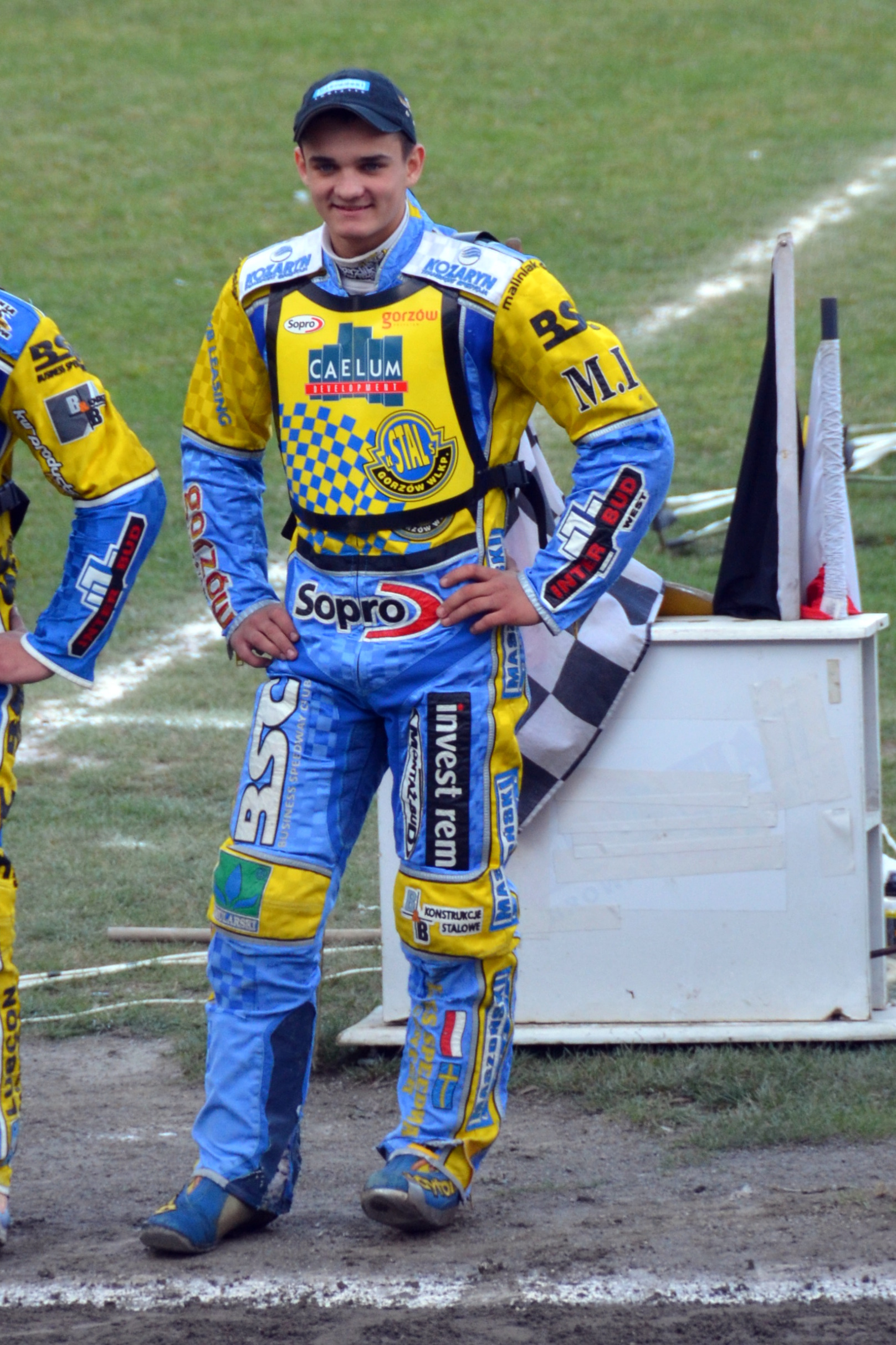
Zmarzlik in 2011

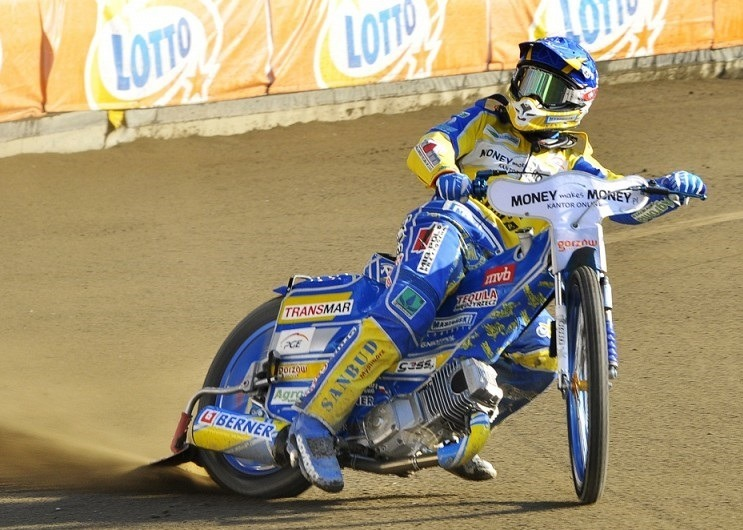
Zmarzlik in 2015

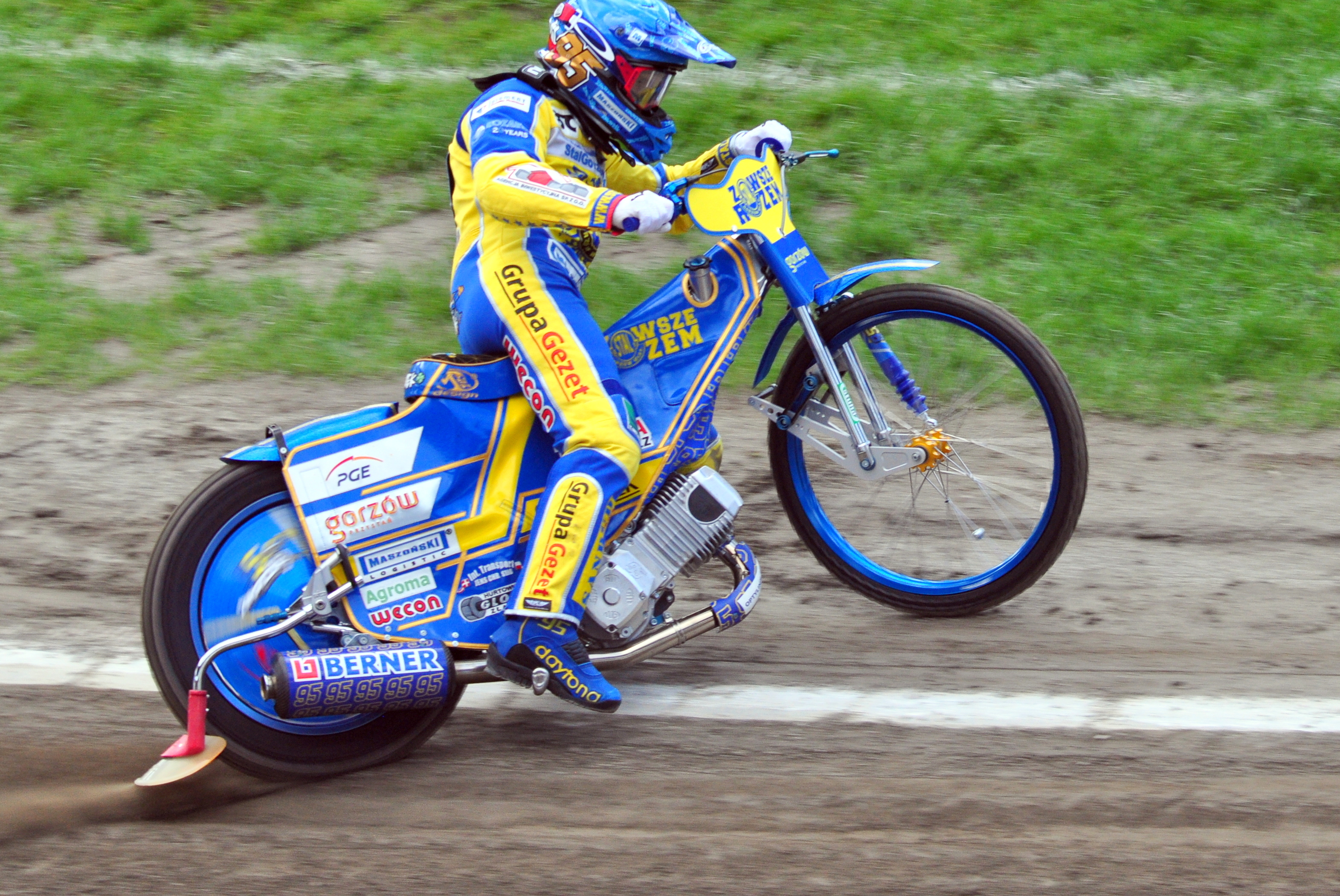
Zmarzlik in 2016

Born in Szczecin, Poland, Zmarzlik is the younger brother of former speedway rider Paweł Zmarzlik. Bartosz first came to the attention of the British speedway public when he was granted a wild card to race in the 2012 Speedway Grand Prix of Poland on 23 June. It was his first appearance in the Grand Prix series. He performed exceptionally well and became the youngest rider to ever appear on the podium in a Speedway Grand Prix, aged just 17 years and 72 days. He finished third that day scoring a grand total of 13 points. Zmarzlik made his British league debut in 2014, agreeing a short-term deal to ride for the Birmingham Brummies to cover the injured Adam Skornicki. However, he withdrew from the team shortly after due to illness and the track was rough.

In September 2015, during the Speedway Grand Prix Qualification, Zmarzlik won the GP Challenge, which ensured that he claimed a permanent slot for the 2016 Grand Prix. He duly rode in 2016 Grand Prix as a permanent rider for the first time in his career, taking third place in the standings. The following season he took fifth, and in 2018 he took second behind multiple World Champion Tai Woffinden.

Zmarzlik signed to ride for Slangerup in the Danish league in 2019. In 2020, he was voted the Polish Sports Personality of the Year. On 3 October 2020, Zmarzlik won his second Speedway World Championship, becoming the first rider to clinch back to back titles since Nicki Pedersen in 2007–08. On 11 July 2021 he became Polish individual champion. In 2021 he took second place in the World Championship, gathering 189 points through whole season with Russian rider Artem Laguta taking the win.

Zmarzlik won his third World Championship title in 2022 after securing the 2022 title. He won the Championship with ease, collecting 166 points, which was of 33 points clear of his nearest rival and included three grand prix wins in Croatia, Denmark and Sweden. He also became the first rider since 2002 to successfully defend the Polish national title.

In 2023, Zmarzlik experienced a stellar season, culminating in his fourth World title. He won his second successive European Team Speedway Championship and then won three of the first five Grand Prix of the season in Goričan, Teterow and Gorzów respectively. In July, he was part of the Polish team that won the gold medal in the 2023 Speedway World Cup final and then he secured a fourth Grand Prix win in Latvia, which equalled the 22 career Grand Prix wins of fellow Pole Tomasz Gollob and put him just one behind Jason Crump.

Despite being disqualified from the Danish Grand Prix for wearing the wrong leathers, Zmarzlik won the final round in Toruń, to win his fourth world title. He also and equalled Jason Crump's record of 23 Grand Prix wins and five in one season.

By winning the 2024 Speedway Grand Prix of Sweden, Zmarzlik broke Jason Crump's all-time record of 23 Grand Prix wins, although ten of them were won on home soil, whereas Crump's were all outside of Australia.

In 2025, Zmarzlik won his sixth Speedway World Championship title.

== Major results ==
=== World individual Championship ===
- 2012 Speedway Grand Prix – 20th (13 pts)
- 2013 Speedway Grand Prix – 24th (6 pts)
- 2014 Speedway Grand Prix – 18th (17 pts)
- 2015 Speedway Grand Prix – 18th (17 pts)
- 2016 Speedway Grand Prix – 3rd (128 pts)
- 2017 Speedway Grand Prix – 5th (121 pts)
- 2018 Speedway Grand Prix – 2nd (129 pts)
- 2019 Speedway Grand Prix – Champion (132 pts)
- 2020 Speedway Grand Prix – Champion (133 pts)
- 2021 Speedway Grand Prix – 2nd (189 pts)
- 2022 Speedway Grand Prix – Champion (166 pts)
- 2023 Speedway Grand Prix – Champion (158 pts)
- 2024 Speedway Grand Prix – Champion (179 pts)
- 2025 Speedway Grand Prix – Champion (183 pts)
- 2026 Speedway Grand Prix – 2nd (160 pts)

=== Grand Prix wins ===
- 1: 2014 Speedway Grand Prix of Poland (Gorzów)
- 2: 2017 Speedway Grand Prix of Sweden
- 3: 2018 Speedway Grand Prix of Great Britain
- 4: 2019 Speedway Grand Prix of Slovenia
- 5: 2019 Speedway Grand Prix of Poland (Wrocław)
- 6: 2019 Speedway Grand Prix of Denmark
- 7: 2020 Speedway Grand Prix of Poland (Gorzów)
- 8: 2020 Speedway Grand Prix of Czech Republic
- 9: 2020 Speedway Grand Prix of Czech Republic
- 10: 2020 Speedway Grand Prix of Poland (Toruń)
- 11: 2021 Speedway Grand Prix of Poland (Wrocław)
- 12: 2021 Speedway Grand Prix of Poland (Wrocław)
- 13: 2021 Speedway Grand Prix of Poland (Lublin)
- 14: 2021 Speedway Grand Prix of Sweden
- 15: 2021 Speedway Grand Prix of Poland (Toruń)
- 16: 2022 Speedway Grand Prix of Croatia
- 17: 2022 Speedway Grand Prix of Denmark
- 18: 2022 Speedway Grand Prix of Sweden
- 19: 2023 Speedway Grand Prix of Croatia
- 20: 2023 Speedway Grand Prix of Germany
- 21: 2023 Speedway Grand Prix of Poland (Gorzów)
- 22: 2023 Speedway Grand Prix of Latvia
- 23: 2023 Speedway Grand Prix of Poland (Toruń)
- 24: 2024 Speedway Grand Prix of Sweden
- 25: 2024 Speedway Grand Prix of Latvia
- 26: 2024 Speedway Grand Prix of Poland (Toruń)
- 27: 2025 Speedway Grand Prix of Germany
- 28: 2025 Speedway Grand Prix of Czech Republic
- 29: 2025 Speedway Grand Prix of Great Britain
- 30: 2026 Speedway Grand Prix of Poland (Wrocław)
- 31: 2026 Speedway Grand Prix of Latvia

=== World team Championships ===
- 2015 Speedway World Cup – 3rd
- 2016 Speedway World Cup – Champion
- 2017 Speedway World Cup – Champion
- 2019 Speedway of Nations – 2nd
- 2020 Speedway of Nations – 2nd
- 2021 Speedway of Nations – 2nd
- 2022 Speedway of Nations – 6th
- 2023 Speedway World Cup – Champion
- 2024 Speedway of Nations – 5th
- 2025 Speedway of Nations – 2nd
- 2026 Speedway World Cup – 3rd

== See also ==
- Poland national speedway team
- List of Speedway Grand Prix riders
