= Jan Kvěch =

Czech speedway rider (born 2001)

- Born: 18 October 2001 (age 25); Strakonice, Czech Republic
- Nationality: Czech

Career history

Czech Republic
- 2024: Prague

Poland
- 2020–2024: Zielona Góra
- 2021: Krosno
- 2023: Rybnik
- 2025: Toruń

Sweden
- 2022: Masarna
- 2023: Lejonen

Great Britain
- 2024–2025: King's Lynn Stars

Speedway Grand Prix statistics
- SGP number: 201
- Starts: 33
- Finalist: 0 times
- Winner: 0 times

Individual honours
- 2024, 2025: Czech Republic champion
- 2022: World Under-21 runner-up
- 2019, 2020: European U19 Champion
- 2026: Golden Helmet of Pardubice

Team honours
- 2024: European U23 Championship silver
- 2025: Polish champion

Jan Kvěch (born 18 October 2001) is a Czech international speedway rider. He is a member of the Czech Republic national speedway team.

== Career ==
Kvěch won the bronze medal at the Czech Republic Championship in 2019. He qualified for the 2021 Speedway Grand Prix and won the 2020 European Individual Speedway Under 19 Championship.

Kvěch won the silver medal at the World Under-21 Championship in the 2022 SGP2 and a silver medal at the 2022 Czech National Championship.

In 2023, Kvěch was part of the Czech team that competed at the 2023 Speedway World Cup in Poland. Also in 2023, by finishing fifth in the Grand Prix Challenge, he sealed a place in the 2024 Speedway Grand Prix.

In 2024, Kvěch made his British debut riding for King's Lynn Stars in the SGB Premiership 2024, rode for the Czech Republic during the 2024 Speedway of Nations (world team championship) and won the silver medal at the 2024 European Under 23 Team Speedway Championship. He finished the season in style after becoming the champion of his country, winning the 2024 Czech Republic title.

Kvěch re-signed for King's Lynn Stars for the SGB Premiership 2025 and successfully defended his Czech title in May 2025. In 2025, he finished 13th in the World Championship.

In 2026, Kvěch won the Golden Helmet of Pardubice.

== Major results ==
=== World individual Championship ===
- 2021 Speedway Grand Prix – 20th (7 pts)
- 2022 Speedway Grand Prix – 29th (1 pt)
- 2024 Speedway Grand Prix – 15th (52 pts)
- 2025 Speedway Grand Prix – 13th (58 pts)
- 2026 Speedway Grand Prix – 13th (52 pts)
