= 2024 German speedway season =

2024 season of motorcycle speedway in Germany

The 2024 German Speedway season is the 2024 season of motorcycle speedway in Germany. The season will run from March to October.

== Individual ==
=== German Individual Speedway Championship ===
The 2024 German Individual Speedway Championship is the 2024 version of German Individual Speedway Championship. Event is scheduled to take place on 21 September in Pocking.

| Pos. | Rider | Club | Total |
|---|---|---|---|
| 1 | | | |
| 2 | | | |
| 3 | | | |
| 4 | | | |
| 5 | | | |
| 6 | | | |
| 7 | | | |
| 8 | | | |
| 9 | | | |
| 10 | | | |
| 11 | | | |
| 12 | | | |
| 13 | | | |
| 14 | | | |
| 15 | | | |
| 16 | | | |
| 17 | | | |
| 18 | | | |

== Team ==
=== Team Championship ===
The 2024 Speedway-Bundesliga is the 2024 edition of the German Team Speedway Championship to determine the gold medal winner (champion of Germany). Teams finishing second and third were awarded silver and bronze medals respectively.

=== Speedway-Bundesliga ===
The Speedway-Bundesliga season will consist of two teams MC Güstrow and MC Nordstern Stralsund. Schedule for this year event contains two rounds (home and away matches – total of 4 matches in season) and grand final.

Leading averages

=== Speedway Team Cup ===
The Speedway Team Cup season will run from 27 April to 8 September.

| Pos | Team | P | #1 | #2 | #3 | #4 | Pts |
|---|---|---|---|---|---|---|---|
| 1 | DMV White Tigers Diedenbergen | | | | | | |
| 2 | MSC Olching | | | | | | |
| 3 | MSC Cloppenburg Fighters | | | | | | |
| 4 | MSC "Wölfe" Wittstock | | | | | | |

==== Calendar ====
| # | Date | Place | Winner | 2nd place | 3rd place | 4th place | N |
| 1 | April 27 | Cloppenburg | | | | | |
| 2 | July 13/14 | Diedenbergen | | | | | |
| 3 | August 3 | Wittstock | | | | | |
| 4 | September 8 | Olching | | | | | |

=== Speedway Liga Nord ===
==== Calendar ====
| # | Date | Place | Winner | 2nd place | 3rd place | 4th place | N |
| 1 | April 21 | Dohren | Meissen (56 pts) | Emsland (48 pts) | Frisian (28 pts) | Teterow (12 pts) | |

== Squads ==
=== Speedway Bundesliga ===
MC Güstrow

- (Sweden) Timo Lahti
- (Denmark) Tim Sørensen
- (Denmark) Jonas Jeppesen
- (Germany) Kevin Wölbert
- (Czech Republic) Adam Bednář

MC Nordstern Stralsund

- (Germany) Norick Blödorn
- (Poland) Mateusz Dul
- (Sweden) Casper Henriksson
- (Denmark) Frederik Jakobsen
- (Sweden) Antonio Lindbäck
- (Poland) Szymon Szlauderbach
- (Sweden) Mathias Thörnblom

=== Speedway Team Cup ===
DMV White Tigers Diedenbergen

- (Germany) Sandro Wassermann
- (Germany) Marius Hillebrand
- (Germany) Erik Riss
- (Germany) Julian Bielmeier
- (Germany) Lukas Wegner
- (Germany) Levin Cording
- (Germany) Magnus Rau

MSC Olching

- (Germany) Valentin Grobauer
- (Germany) Mirko Wolter
- (Germany) Michael Härtel
- (Germany) Erik Bachhuber
- (Germany) Patrick Hyjek
- (Germany) Kacper Cymerman
- (Germany) Carlos Generich

MSC Cloppenburg Fighters

- (Denmark) Nicklas Aagaard
- (Germany) Lukas Fienhage
- (Germany) Jonny Wynant
- (Germany) Janek Konzack
- (Germany) René Deddens
- (Germany) Carl Wynant

MSC "Wölfe" Wittstock

- (Germany) Steven Mauer
- (Germany) Lukas Baumann
- (Germany) Ben Iken
- (Germany) Hannah Grunwald
- (Germany) Richard Geyer
- (Germany) Lester Matthijssen
- (Germany) Tim Arnold

=== Speedway Liga Nord ===
Emsland Speedway Team

- (Germany) Jörg Tebbe
- (Germany) Fabian Wachs
- (Germany) Timo Wachs
- (Germany) Ben Iken
- (Germany) Mike Jarczewski
- (Germany) Louis Tebbe
- (Germany) Levin Cording
- (Germany) Lester Matthijssen

Meissen Hornet

- (Germany) Richard Geyer
- (Germany) Leon Arnheim
- (Germany) Marlon Hegener
- (Germany) Patrick Hyjek
- (Germany) Carl Wynant
- (Germany) Mario Niedermeier
- (Germany) Kacper Cymerman

Torros MC Güstrow

- (Germany) Daniel Rath
- (Germany) Tommy Schwalb
- (Germany) Bruno Thomas
- (Germany) Hannah Grunwald
- (Germany) Magnus Rau
- (Germany) Lucas Rath
- (Germany) Manuel Rau
- (Germany) Carlos Gennerich

Wolfspack Wolfslake

- (Germany) Oliver Petersdorf
- (Germany) Lukas Wegner
- (Germany) Mario Häusl
- (Germany) Patricia Erhart
- (Germany) Tim Widera
- (Germany) Paul Weisheit

Frisian Lions

- (Germany) Jeffrey Sijbesma
- (Germany) Jonny Wynant
- (Germany) Nynke Sijbesma
- (Germany) Jacob Jensen
- (Germany) Thies Schweer
- (Netherlands) Dominic Hamminga

Teterower Hechte

- (Germany) Marcel Sebastian
- (Germany) Marvyn Katt
- (Germany) Nick Haltermann
- (Germany) Mika Frehse
- (Germany) Tyler Termin
- (Germany) Johannes Vagt
- (Germany) Steven Mauer
- (Germany) Matthes Frehse
- (Germany) Tim Arnold

Brokstedt Young Vikings

- (Germany) Mirko Wolter
- (Germany) Birger Jähn
- (Germany) Louis Ruhnke
- (Germany) Niklas Esslinger
- (Germany) Luca Steuck
- (Germany) Ann-Katrin Gerdes
- (Germany) Tom Meyer
- (Germany) Sam Schubert
- (Germany) Niklas Schmidt
