= Mathias Schultz =

German motorcycle speedway rider (born 1984)

- Born: 23 May 1984 (age 42); Schwerin, Germany
- Nationality: German

Career history

Germany
- 1998–1999: Brokstedt
- 2000–2003: Güstrow
- 2004–2005, 2008: Parchim/Wolfslake
- 2006–2007, 2010–2012: Stralsund
- 2012: Wittstock

Poland
- 2006: Opole
- 2007, 2015: Rawicz
- 2008–2009: Łódź

Denmark
- 2008: Holsted
- 2008: Holstebro

Sweden
- 2007: Team Dalakraft Avesta

Individual honours
- 2003, 2005: German champion

Team honours
- 2002, 2003, 2004: Bundesliga title

Mathias Schultz (born 23 May 1984) is a former motorcycle speedway rider from Germany. He was a two-times champion of Germany.

== Career ==
Schultz born in Schwerin, Germany, came to prominence when he won the German Junior Championship in 2000, aged 16. He won three consecutive Bundesliga titles from 2002 until 2004, riding for MC Güstrow and RG Parchim/Wolfslake respectively.

In 2003, Schultz became the champion of Germany, still only aged 19 and would go on to win a second title in 2005.

Schultz represented the German national speedway team during the 2005 Speedway World Cup and 2011 Speedway World Cup, in addition to appearing for his country in several European Pairs Speedway Championship finals.

Schultz began his Polish leagues career riding for Kolejarz Opole, during the 2006 Polish speedway season in the 2.Liga.

Schulz competed in the 2008 Individual Speedway European Championship.

After three silver medals, the last in 2013, Schultz featured on the podium of the German championship again in 2016, when taking the bronze medal.
