= Kai Huckenbeck =

German speedway rider

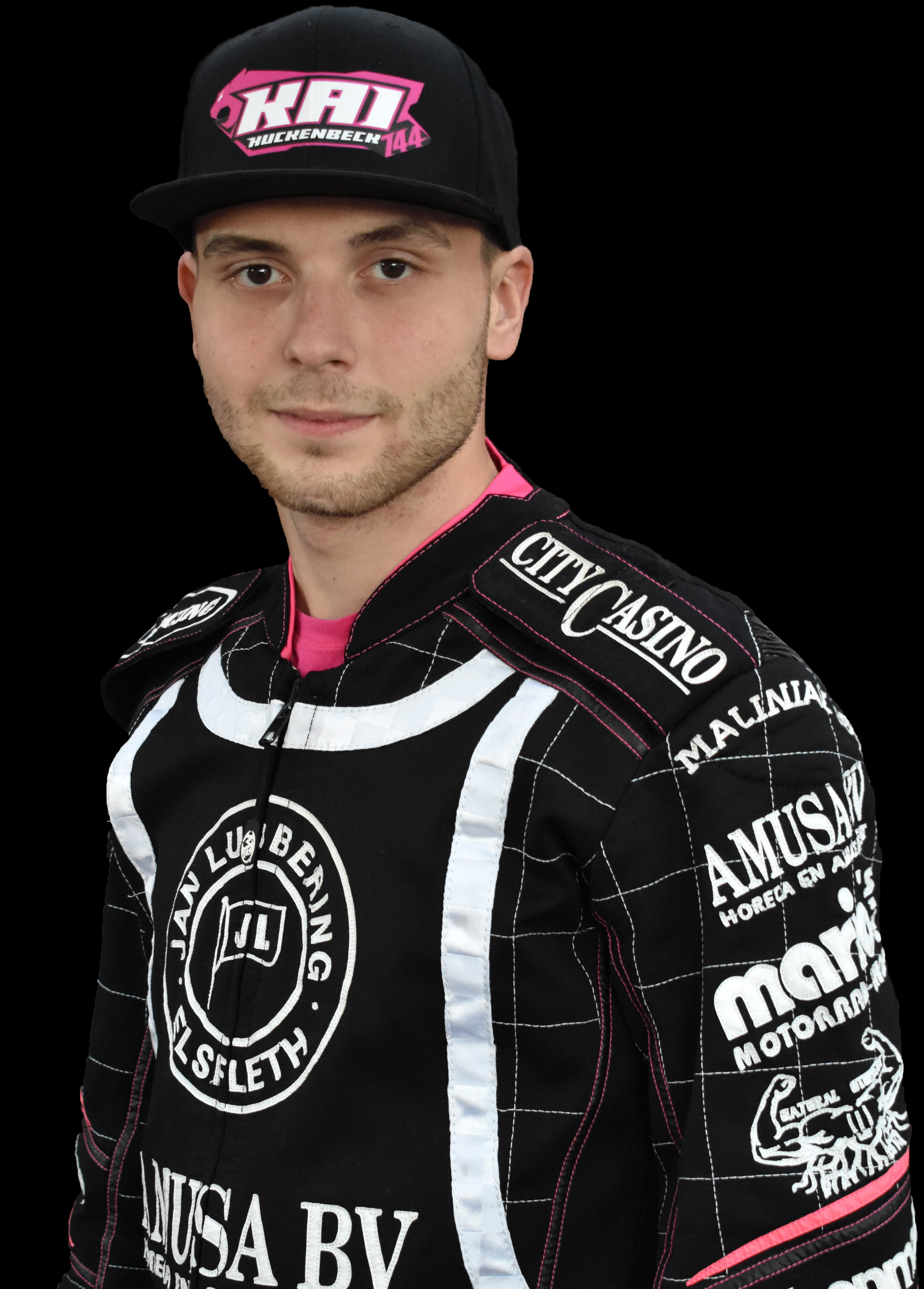
- Born: 23 February 1993 (age 33); Werlte, Germany
- Nationality: German

Career history

Germany
- 2008: Neuenknick
- 2010: Güstrow
- 2011: Wolfslake
- 2012: Diedenbergen
- 2013: Wittstock
- 2016–2019, 2022: Brokstedt

Great Britain
- 2016–2017: King's Lynn

Poland
- 2020, 2024–2025: Bydgoszcz
- 2022: AC Landshut

Sweden
- 2018-2019: Piraterna
- 2020–2025: Rospiggarna

Denmark
- 2018: Esbjerg
- 2021: SES

Speedway Grand Prix statistics
- SGP number: 744
- Starts: 33
- Finalist: 0 times
- Winner: 0 times

Individual honours
- 2013, 2014, 2017: German champion

Kai Huckenbeck (born 23 February 1993) is a motorcycle speedway rider from Germany.

== Career ==
Huckenbeck has been the champion of Germany on three occasions.

Huckenbeck rode in the top tier of British Speedway signing and riding for the King's Lynn Stars in 2016 and in the SGB Premiership 2017.

In 2022, Huckenbeck broke his hip and arm riding for MSC Brokstedt in the German Team Championship. In 2023, he was part of the German team that competed at the 2023 Speedway World Cup in Poland and won two heats in the final round of the 2023 World Championship and later that year, he received a permanent wildcard slot for the 2024 Speedway Grand Prix.

In 2024, Huckenbeck helped Germany reach the final of the 2024 Speedway of Nations in Manchester. In 2025, he finished 15th in the World Championship.

== Major results ==
=== World individual Championship ===
- 2017 Speedway Grand Prix – 26th (4 pts)
- 2018 Speedway Grand Prix – 26th (2 pts)
- 2019 Speedway Grand Prix – 33rd (0 pts)
- 2022 Speedway Grand Prix – 22nd (7 pts)
- 2023 Speedway Grand Prix – 17th (11 pts)
- 2024 Speedway Grand Prix – 12th (61 pts)
- 2025 Speedway Grand Prix – 15th (42 pts)
- 2026 Speedway Grand Prix – 18th (18 pts)

=== World team Championships ===
- 2016 Speedway World Cup – qualifying
- 2017 Speedway World Cup – qualifying
- 2018 Speedway of Nations – 7th
- 2019 Speedway of Nations – 6th
- 2021 Speedway of Nations – semi-final
- 2022 Speedway of Nations – semi-final
- 2023 Speedway World Cup – semi-final
- 2024 Speedway of Nations – 4th
