= Christian Hefenbrock =

German speedway rider

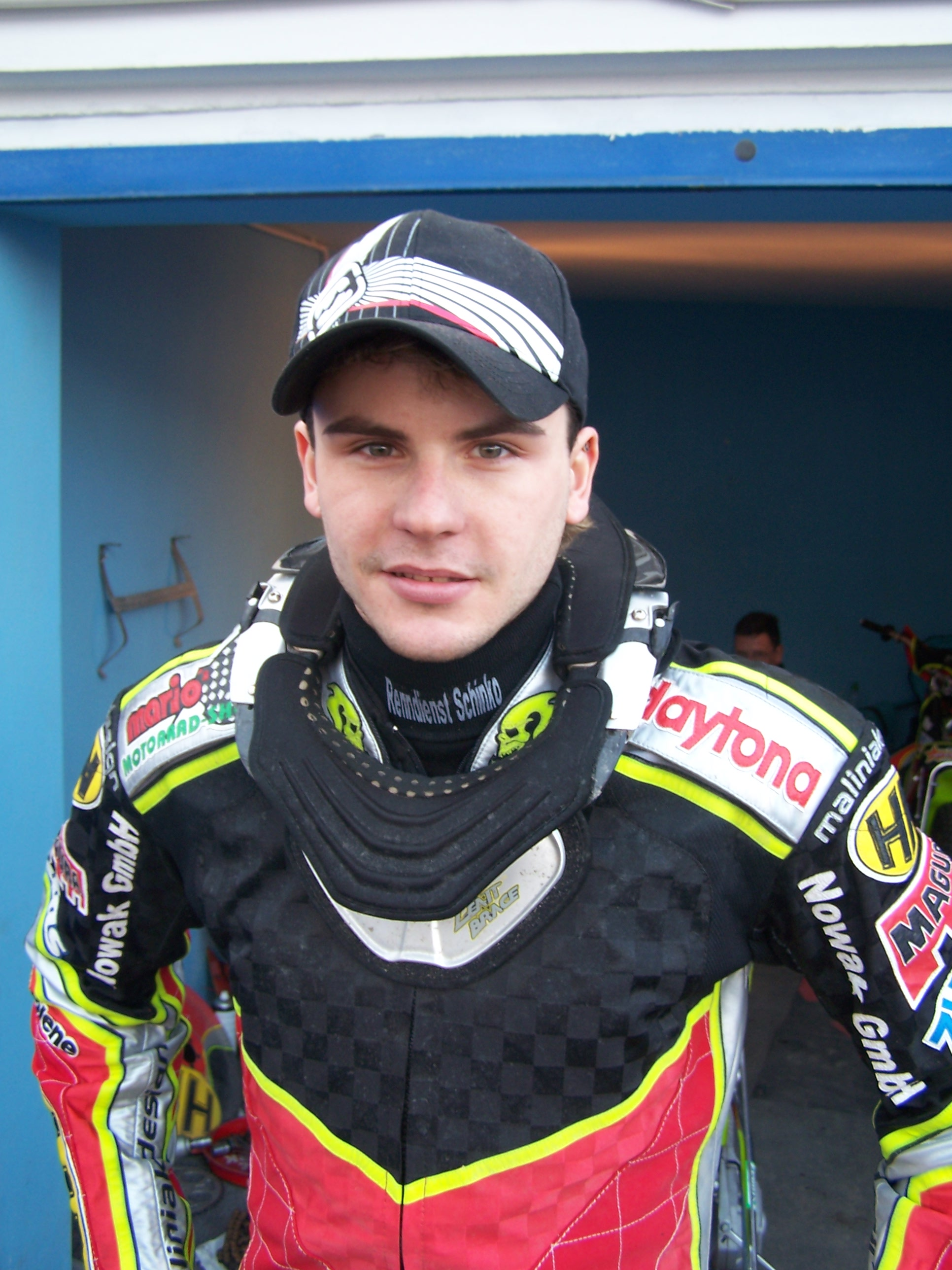
- Born: May 15, 1985 (age 41); Kyritz, Germany
- Nationality: German

Career history

Germany
- 1999–2001, 2012: Wittstock
- 2002: Meissen
- 2002–2004: Parchim/Wolfslake
- 2005–2006: Teterow
- 2007–2008, 2012: Landshut
- 2009–2010: Diedenbergen
- 2011: Stralsund

Poland
- 2007: Częstochowa
- 2008: Bydgoszcz
- 2009: Daugavpils

Great Britain
- 2006, 2008: Wolverhampton Wolves
- 2007: Lakeside Hammers
- 2010: Somerset Rebels

Sweden
- 2003: Örnarna
- 2006: Luxo Stars
- 2007: Dackarna

Denmark
- 2002: Kronjylland
- 2004–2005: Fredericia
- 2007: Holsted

Individual honours
- 2006: German Champion
- 2001, 2005: German Under-21 Champion

Christian Hefenbrock (born 15 May 1985 in Kyritz, Germany) is a German former international motorcycle speedway rider. He earned 10 international caps for the German national speedway team.

== Career ==
Hefenbrock first rode in the United Kingdom for the Wolverhampton Wolves in the Elite League in 2006. It was in 2006 that he became the German champion after winning the German Individual Speedway Championship.

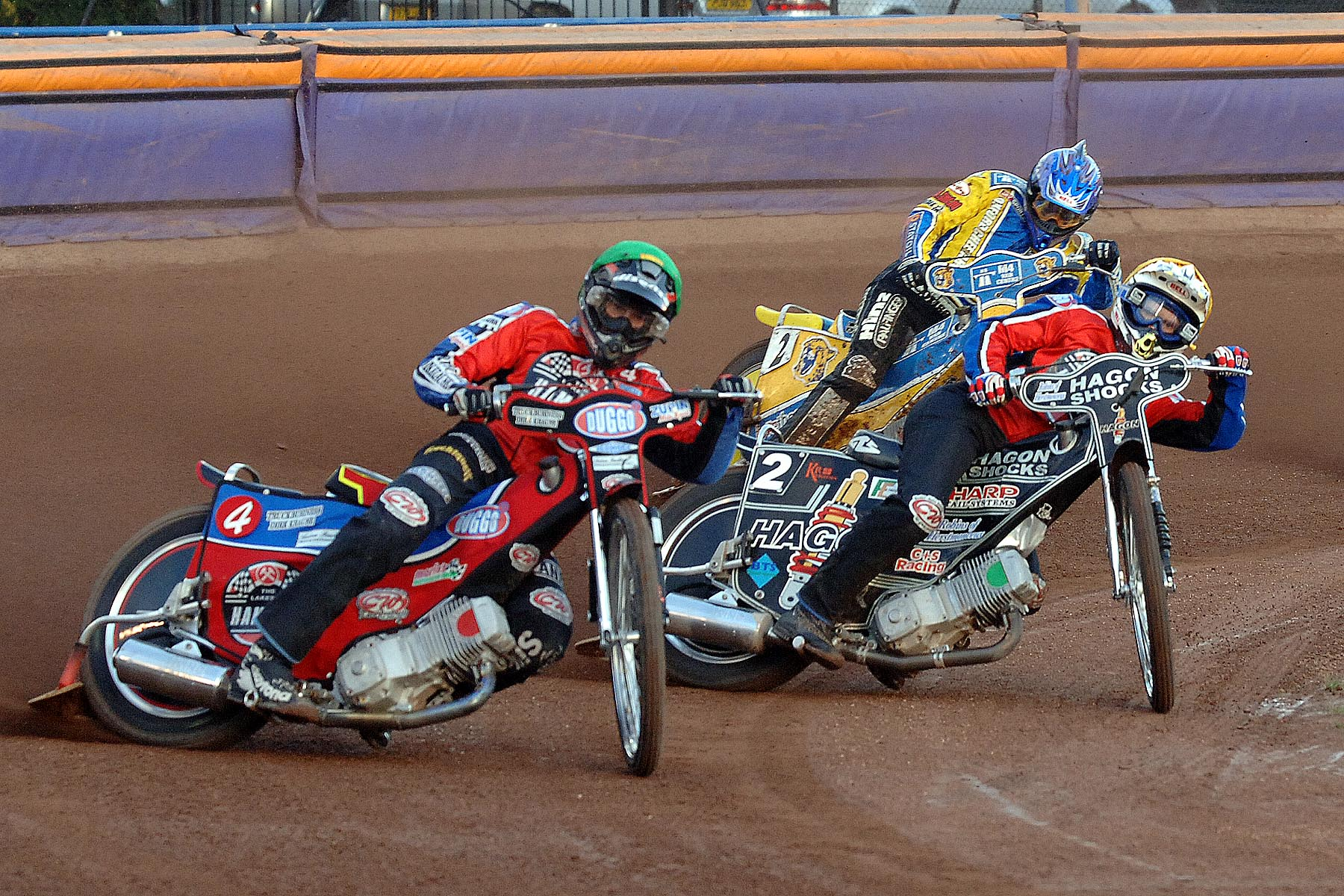
Hefenbrock (left) racing for Lakeside in 2007

In 2007, Hefenbrock was signed by the Lakeside Hammers, but was replaced mid season when one of their own assets was made available. In 2010, he signed for Covebtry Bees on loan from Wolverhampton and in 2011, he rode for Poole Pirates.

Hefenbrock has represented the Germany team in the Speedway World Cup in every tournament from 2003 until 2007. Also in 2007, he was awarded the wild card place for the 2007 Speedway Grand Prix of Germany, winning his opening ride.

== Speedway Grand Prix ==
2007 Speedway Grand Prix Final Championship standings (Riding No 16)
Race no.	Grand Prix	Pos.	Pts.	Heats	Draw No
11 /11	(Germany) German SGP	14	4	(3,0,0,1,0)	2

permanent speedway rider
wild card, track reserve or qualified reserve
rider not classified (track reserve who did not start)

== Career honours ==
Individual World Championship (Speedway Grand Prix):

- 2007 - 27th place (4 points in 1 event)

Individual U-21 World Championship:

- 2004 - 15th place (2 points)
- 2005 - 13th place (3 points)
- 2006 - 3rd place (12+2 points)

Team World Championship (Speedway World Cup):

- 2003 - 10th place ( points in Event 1)
- 2004 - 2nd place in Qualifying round 1 (9 points)
- 2005 - 8th place (0 points in Event 2)
- 2006 - 2nd place in Qualifying round 1 (12 points)
- 2007 - 2nd place in Qualifying round 1 (9 points)
- 2008 - 2nd place in Qualifying round 1 (12 points)
- 2009 - 2nd place in Qualifying round 1 (11 points)

Team U-21 World Championship:

- 2005 - 2nd place in Qualifying Round 1 (6 points)
- 2006 - 4th place (10 points)

Individual European Championship:

- 2006 - 3rd place (12 points)
- 2007 - 8th place (9 points)

Individual U-19 European Championship:

- 2004 - 8th place (6 points)

European Pairs Championship:

- 2004 - track reserve in Semi-Final 1
- 2005 - 5th place (7 points)
- 2006 - 0 points in Semi-Final 2

European Club Champions' Cup:

- 2003 - 3rd place in Group A (8 points)
- 2004 - 3rd place in Group A (12 points)

== See also ==
- Germany national speedway team
- List of Speedway Grand Prix riders
