= Marius Hillebrand =

German motorcycle speedway rider

- Born: 8 January 2000 (age 26); Tettnang, Germany
- Nationality: German

Career history

Germany
- 2022: Stralsund

Poland
- 2022: Grudziądz
- 2021–2025: Landshut

Sweden
- 2022: Vargarna

Individual honours
- 2023: German Championship bronze

Team honours
- 2023: Bundesliga title

Marius Hillebrand (born 8 January 2000) is a German motorcycle speedway rider.

== Career ==
Hillebrand was born in Tettnang, Germany and came to prominence when competing in the Speedway Under-21 World Championship during 2021. In 2022, he helped MC Nordstern Stralsund win the Bundesliga title.

The following year in 2023, Hillebrand won the bronze medal in the German Individual Speedway Championship, behind Kevin Wölbert and Valentin Grobauer. He also represented Germany in the final of the 2023 European U-23 Team Championship.
