= Kevin Wölbert =

German motorcycle speedway rider

- Born: 14 June 1989 (age 37); Crivitz, East Germany
- Nationality: German

Career history

Germany
- 2006–2008: Neuenknick
- 2009: Güstrow
- 2012: Brokstedt
- 2015–2016, 2022: Stralsund
- 2017–2018: Wittstock
- 2019: Diedenbergen

Poland
- 2006–2007, 2024: Zielona Góra
- 2008: Gniezno
- 2009–2010, 2013: Grudziądz
- 2013: Krosno
- 2017–2019: Opole
- 2020–2021: Poznań
- 2022-2023: Rzeszów
- 2025–2026: Landshut

Great Britain
- 2009–2010, 2015–2016: Edinburgh
- 2011: Birmingham
- 2011: Poole
- 2012: King's Lynn
- 2013: Belle Vue
- 2014: Glasgow

Denmark
- 2007: Outrup
- 2009: Vojens
- 2010–2011: Holsted
- 2013: Munkebo
- 2018–2019: Slangerup
- 2021: Esbjerg
- 2023: Grindsted

Speedway Grand Prix statistics
- Starts: 1
- Podiums: 0 (0-0-0)
- Finalist: 0 times
- Winner: 0 times

Individual honours
- 2008, 2011, 2023: German Champion

Team honours
- 2015: Premier League
- 2015: Premier League Fours

Kevin Wölbert (born 14 June 1989) is a German motorcycle speedway rider who has won the Individual German Championship title three times.

== Career history ==
When Max Dilger was injured, Wölbert was nominated as second track reserve at the 2008 German Grand Prix. But, after re-staged this event in Bydgoszcz, Poland (as the Final Grand Prix), Wölbert was replaced by Pole Grzegorz Zengota.

Due to having Polish roots through his grandmother, Wölbert expressed interest in Polish citizenship. He applied for citizenship in November 2009 in the Kuyavian-Pomeranian Voivodeship Office in Bydgoszcz. His application was supported by Robert Malinowski, the President of Grudziądz and GTŻ Grudziądz, his Polish team.

Wölbert started racing in the British leagues during the 2009 Premier League speedway season, when riding for the Edinburgh Monarchs. He made an immediate impression, averaging 8.87 and then 8.53 and 8.82 over the next two seasons with the Scottish club. In 2012, he joined King's Lynn Stars and spent the 2013 season with the Belle Vue Aces.

In 2014, Wölbert joined Glasgow Tigers before re-joining his first British club Edinburgh in 2015. He was part of the Edinburgh team that won the 2015 league title and Premier League Four-Team Championship, although he only rode in the semi finals and not the final.

Wölbert's final season in Britain was in 2016, although he did continue to ride in Poland and Denmark. In 2023, he was part of the German team that competed at the 2023 Speedway World Cup in Poland and he also won his third Germany national title.

=== Major results ===
World Team Championship

- 2008 - 2nd in Qualifying Round One (8 pts)

Individual U-21 World Championship

- 2007 - (Poland) Ostrów Wlkp. - 16th place (1 pt)
- 2008 - 12th place in Qualifying Round Two
- 2009 - 15th place in Semi-Final Two

Team U-21 World Championship

- 2006 - (Poland) Rybnik - 4th place (6 pts)
- 2007 - (Germany) Abensberg - 4th place (3 pts)
- 2008 - 3rd place in the Qualifying Round Two
- 2009 - 2nd place in the Qualifying Round One
- 2010 - 3rd place in the Qualifying Round Two

=== European Championships ===
Individual European Championship

- 2008 7th place in Semi-Final One

Individual U-19 European Championship

- 2005 - (Czech Republic) Mšeno - 8th place (9 pts)
- 2006 - (Croatia) Goričan - 10th place (6 pts)
- 2007 - (Poland) Częstochowa - 8th place (8 pts)
- 2008 - (Germany) Stralsund - 6th place (9 pts)

European Pairs Championship

- 2006 - (Slovenia) Lendava - 7th place (3 pts)
- 2008 - (Austria) Natschbach-Loipersbach - 7th place (1 pt)

Team U-19 European Championship

- 2008 - (Poland) Rawicz - Runner-up (12 pts)

=== Domestic competitions ===
Individual German Championship

- 2008 - German Champion
- 2011 - German Champion
- 2023 - German Champion

== See also ==
- Germany national speedway team (U21, U19)
