= Jörg Pingel =

German speedway rider

- Born: 2 October 1970 (age 56); Elmshorn, Germany
- Nationality: German

Career history

Germany
- 1988–1992, 1999–2001: Brokstedt
- 1997–1998, 2002–2005: Güstrow
- 2004: Diedenbergen
- 2006: Teterow

Great Britain
- 1996: Reading Racers
- 1997–1998, 2000: Berwick Bandits

Denmark
- 2002–2004: Kronjylland

Individual honours
- 1992, 2005: German Individual Championship bronze

Jörg Pingel (born 2 October 1970) is a former motorcycle speedway rider from Germany. He earned two international caps for the German national speedway team.

== Career ==
Pingel came to prominence when winning the bronze medal at the 1992 German Individual Speedway Championship.

Pingel started racing in the British leagues during the 1996 Premier League speedway season, when riding for the Reading Racers and Exeter Falcons but was replaced in the Exeter team by Alun Rossiter.

In 1997, Pingel joined Berwick Bandits for the 1997 Premier League speedway season and reached the final of the Fours Championship. His final season in Britain was with Berwick in 2000. In 2005, he won his second bronze medal at the German Individual Championship.

Pingel represented the Germany national speedway team on two occasions.
