= Steffen Mell =

German speedway rider

- Born: 12 June 1978 (age 48); Teterow, Germany
- Nationality: German

Career history

Germany
- 1998–2005, 2007, 2009–2010, 2012: Güstrow
- 2006: Teterow
- 2007–2008, 2011: Wolfslake
- 2012: Diedenbergen

Great Britain
- 2001: Trelawny Tigers
- 2002: Berwick Bandits
- 2003: King's Lynn Stars
- 2003: Newcastle Diamonds

Poland
- 2009: Piła

Denmark
- 2009: Outrup

Team honours
- 2003: Bundesliga Champion

Steffen Mell (born 12 June 1978 in Teterow) is a former motorcycle speedway rider. He earned two international caps for the German national speedway team.

== Career ==
Mell first rode in the United Kingdom, riding with the Trelawny Tigers in the Premier League. He joined Newcastle in 2003. He won the Bundesliga with Güstrow in 2003.

Mell has represented Germany in the 2001 and 2002 Speedway World Cup.

=== World Championships ===
- Team World Championship (Speedway World Cup)
  - 2001 – Poland - 10th place (0 points in Qualifying round 1)
  - 2002 – England - 12th place (0 points in Qualifying round 1)

=== European Championships ===
- European Club Champions' Cup
  - 2003 – 3rd place in Group A (8 points for MC Güstrow)
