= 2002 Speedway Grand Prix Qualification =

The 2002 Speedway Grand Prix Qualification or GP Challenge was a series of motorcycle speedway meetings used to determine the 12 riders that would qualify for the 2002 Speedway Grand Prix to join the other 10 riders that finished in the leading positions from the 2001 Speedway Grand Prix.

The format changed significantly, in that only 6 riders would qualify through the GP Challenge. The other six places would go to riders seeded through - Rune Holta, Matej Ferjan, Andreas Jonsson, Grzegorz Walasek, Sebastian Ułamek and Krzysztof Cegielski.

Greg Hancock won the GP Challenge.

== Format ==
- First Round - 5 riders from Sweden, 5 from Denmark, 3 from Norway, 3 from Finland to Scandinavian Final
- First Round - 32 riders from Continental quarter finals to Continental semi-finals
- First Round - 6 riders from British Final to Overseas Final
- First Round - 5 riders from Australian Final to Overseas Final
- First Round - 1 rider from Canadian Final to Overseas Final
- First Round - 4 riders from United States Final to Overseas Final
- Second Round - 8 riders from Scandinavian Final to Intercontinental Final
- Second Round - 8 riders from Overseas Final to Intercontinental Final
- Second Round - 16 riders from Continental semi-finals to Continental Final
- Third Round - 9 riders (outside the top 10) from the 2001 Grand Prix & World U21 champion to GP Challenge
- Third Round - 5 riders from the Continental Final to GP Challenge
- Third Round - 9 riders from the Intercontinental Final to GP Challenge
- Final Round - 6 riders from the GP Challenge to the 2002 Grand Prix

== First round ==
=== Continental quarter finals ===
QF (28 Apr (Italy) Lonigo)
Pos	Rider	Points
1	(Poland) Krzysztof Jabłoński	15
2	(Italy) Armando Castagna	14
3	(Italy) Andrea Maida	12
4	(Germany) Mirko Wolter	10
5	(Italy) Alessandro Dalla Valle	8
6	(Hungary) László Szatmári	8
7	(Czech Republic) Pavel Ondrašík	8
8	(Russia) Sergej Darkin	8
9	(Germany) Steffen Mell	7
10	(Slovenia) Jernej Kolenko	6
11	(Austria) Manuel Hautzinger	6
12	(Poland) Piotr Dym	5
13	(Italy) Francesco Ulian	5
14	(Russia) Oleg Kurguskin	3
15	(Ukraine) Igor Borisenko	2
16	(Ukraine) Igor Epifanov	1
17	(Italy) Simone Tadiello	1

QF (1 May (Hungary) Debrecen)
Pos	Rider	Points
1	(Czech Republic) Marián Jirout	14
2	(Poland) Robert Kościecha	14
3	(Poland) Tomasz Bajerski	13
4	(Hungary) Sándor Tihanyi	13
5	(Latvia) Andrej Korolev	10
6	(Austria) Walter Nebel	9
7	(Hungary) Attila Stefáni	9
8	(Slovenia) Matej Žagar	8
9	(Austria) Thomas Stadler	8
10	(Hungary) Sandor Fekete	6
11	(Latvia) Alexander Biznya	5
12	(Slovenia) Josef Koren	4
13	(Italy) Christian Miotello	3
14	(Italy) Soni Francovig	2
15	(Netherlands) Uilke Kooistra	1
16	(Netherlands) Eddie Turksema	1
17	(Hungary) Csaba Hell	0

QF (12 May (Slovenia) Krško)
Pos	Rider	Points
1	(Czech Republic) Aleš Dryml Jr.	14
2	(Poland) Sebastian Ułamek	12+3
3	(Czech Republic) Václav Milík Sr.	12+2
4	(Czech Republic) Lukáš Dryml	11
5	(Slovenia) Zlatko Krznaric	10
6	(Slovenia) Izak Šantej	10
7	(Poland) Jacek Rempala	10
8	(Poland) Jacek Krzyżaniak	10
9	(Czech Republic) Michal Makovský	9
10	(Germany) Björn Danielczyk	5
11	(Czech Republic) Adrian Rymel	5
12	(France) Stéphane Trésarrieu	4
13	(Germany) Stephan Katt	4
14	(France) Christophe Dubernard	1
15	(France) Fabrice Ostyn	1
16	(Slovenia) Stanko Glava	1
17	(Slovenia) Primoz Klenovsek	1
18	(France) Thomas Cyril	1

QF (26 May (Germany) Pocking)
Pos	Rider	Points
1	(Poland) Wiesław Jaguś	14
2	(Czech Republic) Antonín Kasper Jr.	13+3
3	(Czech Republic) Bohumil Brhel	13+2
4	(Hungary) Róbert Nagy	11
5	(Germany) Robbie Kessler	10
6	(Poland) Damian Baliński	10
7	(Russia) Eduard Shaihullin	8
8	(Germany) Joachim Kugelmann	7
9	(Hungary) Norbert Magosi	7
10	(Germany) Matthias Kröger	7
11	(Estonia) Rene Aas	6
12	(Russia) Rinat Mardanshin	6
13	(Czech Republic) Josef Franc	3
14	(Czech Republic) Richard Wolff	3
15	(Czech Republic) Radek Smolik	1
16	(Latvia) Dennis Popovic	1

== Second round ==
=== Overseas Final ===
8 riders to Intercontinental Final

=== Scandinavian Final ===
8 riders to Intercontinental Final

(17 June 2001 (Finland) Pori)
Pos	Rider	Points
1	(Finland) Kai Laukkanen	15
2	(Sweden) Andreas Jonsson	12
3	(Sweden) Stefan Andersson	11
4	(Norway) Lars Gunnestad	10
5	(Denmark) Hans Clausen	10
6	(Sweden) Niklas Karlsson	10
7	(Denmark) Jesper B Jensen	9
8	(Finland) Kauko Nieminen	9
9	(Denmark) Bjarne Pedersen	8
10	(Denmark) Charlie Gjedde	7
11	(Norway) Björn G Hansen	5
12	(Sweden) Stefan Ekberg	5
13	(Sweden) Freddie Eriksson	3
14	(Finland) Joonas Kylmäkorpi	3
15	(Denmark) Claus Kristensen	2
16	(Norway) Roy Håland	1

=== Continental semi finals ===
Continental semi-finals - 16 riders from to Continental final

SF

- 16 June 2001 (Italy) Terenzano

Pos.	Rider	Points
1	(Poland) Wiesław Jaguś	12
2	(Czech Republic) Bohumil Brhel	12
3	(Czech Republic) Michal Makovský	12
4	(Italy) Alessandro Dalla Valle	11
5	(Poland) Damian Baliński	10
6	(Croatia) Zlatko Krznaric	10
7	(Italy) Andrea Maida	10
8	(Poland) Robert Kościecha	9
9	(Italy) Aleš Dryml Jr.	8
10	(Hungary) Attila Stefáni	6
11	(Germany) Joachim Kugelmann	5
12	(Poland) Krzysztof Jabłoński	5
13	(Slovenia) Matej Žagar	4
14	(Hungary) László Szatmári	3
15	(Hungary) Norbert Magosi	3
16	(Austria) Walter Nebel	0
17	(Czech Republic) Adrian Rymel	0
18	(Slovenia) Jernej Kolenko	0

SF

- 16 June 2001 (Czech Republic) Mšeno

Pos.	Rider	Points
1	(Poland) Sebastian Ułamek	15
2	(Poland) Tomasz Bajerski	11
3	(Hungary) Róbert Nagy	11
4	(Poland) Jacek Rempala	9
5	(Italy) Armando Castagna	9
6	(Latvia) Andrej Korolew	9
7	(Czech Republic) Marián Jirout	9
8	(Czech Republic) Antonín Kasper Jr.	8
9	(Russia) Sergej Darkin	8
10	(Germany) Robbie Kessler	6
11	(Hungary) Sándor Tihanyi	5
12	(Russia) Eduard Shaihullin	5
13	(Slovenia) Izak Šantej	4
14	(Poland) Jacek Krzyżaniak	4
15	(Austria) Thomas Stadler	3
16	(Germany) Steffen Mell	2
17	(Czech Republic) Pavel Ondrašík	2

== Third round ==
- 9 riders (outside the top 10) from the 2001 Grand Prix & World U21 champion to GP Challenge

=== Intercontinental Final ===
9 riders to GP Challenge

=== Continental Final ===
- 5 riders to GP Challenge
- 12 August 2001 (Poland) Gdańsk

Pos.	Rider	Points
1	(Poland) Sebastian Ułamek	13
2	(Czech Republic) Bohumil Brhel	12
3	(Poland) Wiesław Jaguś	12
4	(Czech Republic) Antonín Kasper Jr.	11
5	(Poland) Damian Baliński	11
6	(Poland) Tomasz Bajerski	10
7	(Latvia) Andrej Korolew	10
8	(Poland) Jacek Rempala	8
9	(Hungary) Róbert Nagy	7
10	(Italy) Armando Castagna	6
11	(Poland) Robert Kościecha	6
12	(Croatia) Zlatko Krznaric	6
13	(Czech Republic) Marián Jirout	4
14	(Italy) Andrea Maida	3
15	(Czech Republic) Michal Makovský	1
16	(Italy) Alessandro Dalla Valle	0

== Final Round ==
=== GP Challenge ===
6 riders to 2002 Grand Prix

- 13 October 2001 (Slovenia) Krško

Pos.	Rider	pre-event	main-event	sf	Final
1	(United States) Greg Hancock	x	2, 3	2	3
2	(Denmark) Nicki Pedersen	x	1, 3, 3	2	2
3	(England) Scott Nicholls	0, 3, 3	3, 2	3	1
4	(Czech Republic) Lukáš Dryml	3, 2	0, 3, 3	3	0
5	(England) Carl Stonehewer	x	2, 1, 2	1	x
6	(England) Andy Smith	x	3, 3	1	x
7	(Sweden) Peter Karlsson	x	2, 2,	0	x
8	(Poland) Piotr Protasiewicz	x	0, 2, 2	0	x
9	(England) Chris Louis	2, 1, 3	3, 0, 1	x	x
10	(Sweden) Andreas Jonsson	1, 2, 2	2, 0, 1	x	x
11	(Poland) Sebastian Ułamek	3, 1, 2	3, 1, 0	x	x
12	(United States) Sam Ermolenko	3, 3	1, 2, 0	x	x
13	(Denmark) Brian Andersen	x	1, 1	x	x
14	(Slovenia) Matej Ferjan	x	1, 1	x	x
15	(Czech Republic) Bohumil Brhel	2, 3	0, 0	x	x
16	(Sweden) Stefan Andersson	3, 2	0, 0	x	x
17	(Australia) Jason Lyons	1, 3, 1	x	x	x
18	(Poland) Damian Baliński	2, 0, 1	x	x	x
19	(Finland) Kai Laukkanen	2, 0, 0	x	x	x
20	(England) Gary Havelock	0, 2, 0	x	x	x
21	(Poland) Wiesław Jaguś	0, 1	x	x	x
22	(Norway) Lars Gunnestad	1, 1	x	x	x
23	(England) Sean Wilson	1, 0	x	x	x
24	(Czech Republic) Antonín Kasper Jr.	0, 0	x	x	x
