= Lukas Baumann =

German motorcycle speedway rider

- Born: 22 December 2000 (age 25); Crivitz, Germany
- Nationality: German

Career history

Germany
- 2022: Stralsund
- 2020, 2023: Güstrow

Poland
- 2020–2021: Wittstock
- 2022: Wrocław
- 2023–2024: Landshut

Individual honours
- 2021: German U21 champion

Team honours
- 2022, 2023: Bundesliga title

Lukas Baumann (born 22 December 2000) is a motorcycle speedway rider from Germany.

== Career ==
Baumann was born in Crivitz, Germany and came to prominence when competing in three consecutive Speedway Under-21 World Championships during 2019, 2020 and 2021. He secured his best result when winning the German individual U21 championship.

Baumann represented Germany in the finals of the 2021 European U-23 Team Championship and the 2023 European U-23 Team Championship and the 2021 Speedway European Championship.

Also in 2023, Baumann helped MC Güstrow win the Bundesliga title.
