= Valentin Grobauer =

German speedway rider

- Born: 21 December 1994 (age 31); Rotthalmünster, Germany
- Nationality: German

Career history

Germany
- 2012, 2022: Diedenbergen
- 2022: Olching

Poland
- 2016: Opole
- 2017: Rawicz
- 2018-2019: Bydgoszcz
- 2020: Wittstock
- 2021-2022, 2024–2025: Landshut

Great Britain
- 2019: Somerset Rebels
- 2021: Birmingham Brummies

Sweden
- 2022: Örnarna

Individual honours
- 2023: German Championship silver

Valentin Grobauer (born 21 December 1994) is a German international motorcycle speedway rider.

== Career ==
Grobauer won three bronze medals at the German U21 Championship in 2012, 2013 and 2015. He reached two European Junior Championship finals in 2013 and 2014.

In 2015, Grobauer reached both finals of the 2015 Team Speedway Junior World Championship and the 2015 Speedway Under-21 World Championship.

Grobauer represented Germany at the 2021 Speedway of Nations. In 2021, he signed for Birmingham Brummies for the SGB Championship 2021.

In 2023, Grobauer won the silver medal in the 2023 German Individual Speedway Championship behind Kevin Wölbert.

== Major results ==
=== World team Championships ===
- 2021 Speedway of Nations - =8th

== See also ==
- Germany national speedway team
