= 2011 Speedway World Cup =

52nd edition of the annual motorcycle speedway World Cup competition

Speedway World Cup
- Venue: Gorzów Wielkopolski
- Location: Poland
- Start date: 9 July
- End date: 16 July
- Nations: 8

Champions
- Poland

The 2011 FIM Speedway World Cup (SWC) was the eleventh FIM Speedway World Cup, the annual international speedway world championship tournament. It took place between 9 July and 16 July 2011 and involved eight national teams. Six teams were seeded through to the tournament and two qualification rounds were held in April and May 2011 to determine the final two places.

== Qualification ==
The top six nations from the 2010 Speedway World Cup (Poland, Denmark, Sweden, Great Britain, Australia and Russia) were granted automatic qualification, with the remaining two places divided among two qualifying rounds. Qualifying Round One was hosted in Lonigo, Italy and Qualifying Round Two was hosted in Landshut, Germany. Czech Republic and Germany qualified for the tournament.

- Qualifying Round One
- (Italy) Santa Marina Stadium, Lonigo
- 17 April 2011

| National team | Pts |
|---|---|
| Czech Republic | 49 |
| Slovenia | 44 |
| Latvia | 39 |
| Italy | 17 |

- Qualifying Round Two
- (Germany) Ellermühle Speedway Stadium, Landshut
- 7 May 2011

| National team | Pts |
|---|---|
| Germany | 47 |
| United States | 39 |
| Finland | 38 |
| Ukraine | 26 |

=== Qualified teams ===
| Team | Qualified as | Finals appearance | Last appearance | 2010 place |
|---|---|---|---|---|
| Poland | 2010 SWC top six | 11th | 2010 | 1 |
| Denmark | 2010 SWC top six | 11th | 2010 | 2 |
| Sweden | 2010 SWC top six | 11th | 2010 | 3 |
| Great Britain | 2010 SWC top six | 11th | 2010 | 4 |
| Australia | 2010 SWC top six | 11th | 2010 | 5 |
| Russia | 2010 SWC top six | 9th | 2010 | 6 |
| Czech Republic | QR 1 Winner | 10th | 2010 | 8 |
| Germany | QR 2 Winner | 5th | 2005 | — |

== Tournament ==
Semifinals
July 9 — Vojens
Denmark | 50
Sweden | 48
Australia | 47
Germany | 9
July 11 — King's Lynn
Poland | 62
Great Britain | 49
Russia | 21
Czech Republic | 20

Race-off
July 14 — Gorzów
Australia | 51
Sweden | 44
Russia | 33
Great Britain | 30

Final
July 16 — Gorzów
Poland | 51
Australia | 45
Sweden | 30
Denmark | 29

== Semi-finals ==
| National team | Pts | Scorers |
|---|---|---|
| Denmark | 50 | Mads Korneliussen 12, Bjarne Pedersen 12, Kenneth Bjerre 11, Nicki Pedersen (C) 10, Niels Kristian Iversen 5 |
| Sweden | 48 | Antonio Lindbäck 12, Andreas Jonsson (C) 11, Freddie Lindgren 10, Jonas Davidsson 8, Thomas H. Jonasson 7 |
| Australia | 47 | Chris Holder 14, Darcy Ward 13, Jason Crump (C) 11, Rory Schlein 5, Troy Batchelor 4 |
| Germany | 9 | Max Dilger 4, Kevin Wölbert 2, Mathias Schultz 2, Tobias Busch 1, Tobias Kroner (C) 0 |

| National team | Pts | Scorers |
|---|---|---|
| Poland | 62 | Krzysztof Kasprzak 15, Tomasz Gollob (C) 13, Piotr Protasiewicz 13, Janusz Kołodziej 11, Jarosław Hampel 10 |
| Great Britain | 49 | Chris Harris (C) 16, Edward Kennett 11, Tai Woffinden 10, Scott Nicholls 6, Ben Barker 6 |
| Russia | 21 | Roman Povazhny (C) 8, Renat Gafurov 6, Sergey Darkin 4, Ilya Bondarenko 3 |
| Czech Republic | 20 | Lukáš Dryml 9, Tomáš Topinka 5, Filip Šitera 4, Aleš Dryml Jr. (C) 2, Matěj Kůs 0 |

== Race-off ==
| National team | Pts | Scorers |
|---|---|---|
| Australia | 51 | Troy Batchelor 13, Jason Crump (C) 12, Chris Holder 11, Darcy Ward 9, Davey Watt 6 |
| Sweden | 44 | Andreas Jonsson (C) 16, Antonio Lindbäck 11, Thomas H. Jonasson 7, Jonas Davidsson 6, Freddie Lindgren 4 |
| Russia | 33 | Emil Sayfutdinov 19, Grigory Laguta 8, Roman Povazhny (C) 5, Denis Gizatullin 1, Renat Gafurov 0 |
| Great Britain | 30 | Chris Harris (C) 14, Ben Barker 7, Tai Woffinden 6, Edward Kennett 2, Lewis Bridger 1 |

== Final ==
| Pos | Team | Pts | Riders |
|---|---|---|---|
| 1 | Poland | 51 | Tomasz Gollob (C) 17, Jaroslaw Hampel 11, Krzysztof Kasprzak 8, Piotr Protasiewicz 8, Janusz Kołodziej 7 |
| 2 | Australia | 45 | Chris Holder 15, Jason Crump (C) 13, Troy Batchelor 10, Darcy Ward 4, Davey Watt 3 |
| 3 | Sweden | 30 | Fredrik Lindgren 12, Antonio Lindbäck 8, Thomas H. Jonasson 7, Jonas Davidsson 2, Andreas Jonsson (C) 1 |
| 4 | Denmark | 29 | Kenneth Bjerre 10, Niels Kristian Iversen 8, Nicki Pedersen (C) 5, Bjarne Pedersen 3, Mads Korneliussen 3 |

== Final classification ==
| Pos. | National team | Pts. |
|---|---|---|
| Gold | Poland | 51 |
| Silver | Australia | 45 |
| Bronze | Sweden | 30 |
| 4 | Denmark | 29 |
| 5 | Russia | 33 |
| 6 | Great Britain | 30 |
| 7 | Czech Republic | 20 |
| 8 | Germany | 9 |

== See also ==
- 2011 Speedway Grand Prix
- 2011 Team Speedway Junior World Championship
