= Erik Bachhuber =

German speedway rider

- Born: 6 October 2003 (age 23); Augsburg, Germany
- Nationality: German

Career history

Germany
- 2022: Olching

Poland
- 2021: Wittstock
- 2023–2024: Landshut

Sweden
- 2023–2024: Valsarna

Individual honours
- 2021: German U21 champion

Team honours
- 2021: German league winner

Erik Bachhuber (born 6 October 2003) is a former motorcycle speedway rider from Germany.

== Career ==
Bachhuber won the German 125cc title twice in 2016 and 2017 before moving up to 250cc, which he also won in 2019. He came to prominence when winning the German U21 title and winning the German league title with MSC Olching. In 2022, he reached the final of the 2022 Individual Speedway Junior European Championship.

In the Polish leagues, Bachhuber has ridden for MSC Wölfe Wittstock in 2021 and AC Landshut since 2023. He represented the Germany national speedway team in the final of the 2023 European Team Speedway Championship.

In 2024, Bachhuber announced he was leaving the sport.

== See also ==
- Germany national speedway team
- List of Speedway Grand Prix riders
