= 2013 Speedway European Championship qualification =

European motorcycle racing event

The 2013 Speedway European Championship qualification events took place from April 20 to July 6, 2013. There were four final meetings with fifteen permanent riders and one wild cards and two track reserves. The permanent riders were determined in three SEC Semifinal and one SEC Challenge.

== Qualification system ==
Three Semifinals were started with 48 competitors each. The top five winners advanced to the next round.

== Results ==
=== Semifinal One – Chervonohrad, Ukraine ===
- 20 April 2013
- (Ukraine) Mototrek Hirnyk, Chervonohrad
- (Length: 365 m)
- Referee: (Czech Republic) Pavel Vana
- References
- Changes:
  - Draw 4. (Italy) (4) Guglielmo Franchetti → Draw 17. Krawczuk
  - Draw 8. (Croatia) (8) Renato Cvetko → Kobrin

Pos.	Rider	Points	Details
1	(Denmark) (2) Leon Madsen	13	(3,3,3,3,1)
2	(Russia) (11) Roman Povazhny	12+3	(3,3,3,0,3)
3	(Latvia) (10) Maksims Bogdanovs	12+2	(3,2,3,2,2)
4	(Ukraine) (7) Andriej Karpow	11+3	(1,2,2,3,3)
5	(Latvia) (5) Andrzej Lebiediew	11+2	(2,3,2,3,1)
6	(Germany) (13) Tobias Busch	11+1	(3,2,3,1,2)
7	(Czech Republic) (15) Václav Milík, Jr.	9	(2,0,1,3,3)
8	(Poland) (3) Maciej Janowski	9	(2,1,1,2,3)
9	(Poland) (14) Przemysław Pawlicki	9	(1,2,2,2,2)
10	(Ukraine) (16) Aleksandr Loktaev	7	(0,3,2,X,2)
11	(Hungary) (9) Norbert Magosi	5	(2,1,0,2,0)
12	(Slovenia) (12) Ziga Radkovic	4	(1,1,0,1,1)
13	(Ukraine) (8) Andriej Kobrin	4	(0,1,1,1,1)
14	(Romania) (6) Alexandru Toma	1	(0,0,1,0,0)
15	(Slovakia) (1) Jan Mesiarik	1	(1,0,0,0,0)
16	(Ukraine) (4) Jewgienij Krawczuk	1	(0,0,0,1,0)
—	(Ukraine) (18) Pavel Kondratiuk	—	—

=== Semifinal Three – Mureck, Austria ===
- 23 June 2013
- (Austria) Mureck, Styria
- (Length: 389 m)
- Referee: (Poland) Marek Wojaczek
- References
- Change:
  - Draw 10. (Slovenia) Matej Žagar → Gregoric or Voldrih
  - Draw 12. French spot → Gregoric or Voldrih

Pos.	Rider	Points	Details
1	(Latvia) (1) Kjasts Puodžuks	14+3	(3,3,3,2,3)
2	(Denmark) (4) Kenni Larsen	14+2	(2,3,3,3,3)
3	(Russia) (11) Grigory Laguta	12	(3,3,2,3,1)
4	(Czech Republic) (6) Zdeněk Simota	11	(3,3,1,1,3)
5	(Poland) (5) Grzegorz Zengota	10	(2,2,3,3,0)
6	(Italy) (9) Nicolas Covatti	9	(1,0,3,2,3)
7	(Sweden) (14) Antonio Lindbäck	9	(3,T,1,3,2)
8	(Germany) (3) Matthias Schultz	9	(1,2,2,2,2)
9	(France) (13) Mathieu Trésarrieu	7	(2,1,2,2,0)
10	(Slovenia) (10 or 12) Matic Voldrih	7	(2,2,1,1,1)
11	(Ukraine) (2) Stanisław Mielniczuk	6	(T,1,2,1,2)
12	(Slovenia) (10 or 12) Maks Gregorič	4	(0,2,1,0,1)
13	(Slovenia) (16) Aleksander Čonda	4	(1,1,0,1,1)
14	(Austria) (8) Dany Gappmaier	2	(R,0,0,0,2)
15	(Austria) (7) Fritz Wallner	2	(1,1,R,F,0)
16	(Austria) (18) Christian Pelikan	0	(0,0)
17	(Finland) (15) Marko Suojanen	0	(0,R,R,F,-)
18	(Czech Republic) (17) Michal Dudek	0	(0,F)

=== Semifinal Two – Debrecen, Hungary ===
- 1 May 2013
- (Hungary) Debrecen, Hajdú-Bihar County
- (Length: 398 m)
- Referee: (Denmark) Jesper Steentoft
- References
- Change:
  - Draw 7. (Denmark) Peter Kildemand → Porsing

Pos.	Rider	Points	Details
1	(Croatia) (5) Jurica Pavlic	14+3	(3,3,3,3,2)
2	(Poland) (4) Robert Miśkowiak	14+2	(3,2,3,3,3)
3	(Denmark) (11) Hans N. Andersen	12	(2,3,3,3,1)
4	(Poland) (8) Sebastian Ułamek	11	(1,3,3,1,3)
5	(Poland) (12) Janusz Kołodziej	11	(3,1,1,3,3)
6	(Denmark) (7) Nicklas Porsing	9	(2,2,2,1,2)
7	(Sweden) (2) Peter Karlsson	8+3	(1,2,2,0,3)
8	(Czech Republic) (13) Tomáš Suchánek	8+2	(3,0,1,2,2)
9	(Germany) (1) Christian Hefenbrock	8+1	(2,1,1,2,2)
10	(Hungary) (9) József Tabaka	7	(1,2,2,1,1)
11	(Czech Republic) (16) Matěj Kůs	6	(2,0,2,2,0)
12	(Czech Republic) (6) Martin Gavenda	5	(0,3,0,2,X)
13	(Italy) (15) Guglielmo Franchetti	3	(1,1,0,R,1)
14	(Slovenia) (3) Jernej Pecnik	2	(0,0,1,0,1)
15	(Slovenia) (10) Denis Štojs	2	(R,1,0,1,0)
16	(Ukraine) (14) Paweł Kondratiuk	0	(0,0,0,0,0)
—	(Hungary) (17) Roland Benko	—	—
—	(Hungary) (18) Robert Tabaka	—	—

Only top two riders from one country can qualify to the Chellange. For that reason, Kołodziej, did not qualify.

=== Challenge – Žarnovica, Slovakia ===
- 6 July 2013
- (Slovakia) Žarnovica, Banská Bystrica Region
- (Length: )
- Referee:
- Jury President:
- References
- Change:
  - Draw 16. (Sweden) Peter Karlsson → Janowski
  - Draw 4. (Denmark) Kenni Larsen → Covatti
  - Draw 18. (Germany) Christian Hefenbrock → Suchánek

Pos.	Rider	Points	Details
1	(Croatia) (13) Jurica Pavlic	12	(3,3,3,0,3)
2	(Russia) (7) Roman Povazhny	10+3	(2,2,2,3,1)
3	(Russia) (11) Grigory Laguta	10+2	(1,3,3,3,X)
4	(Slovakia) (5) Martin Vaculík	10+1	(1,2,3,1,3)
5	(Ukraine) (8) Andriej Karpow	10+0	(3,1,2,2,2)
6	(Poland) (16) Maciej Janowski	10	(1,3,1,3,2)
7	(Denmark) (14) Hans N. Andersen	9	(2,3,3,0,1)
8	(Poland) (2) Sebastian Ułamek	9	(3,2,0,1,3)
9	(Latvia) (12) Kjasts Puodžuks	9	(3,2,2,1,1)
10	(Denmark) (10) Leon Madsen	8	(2,1,0,2,3)
11	(Poland) (1) Robert Miśkowiak	8	(2,1,2,2,1)
12	(Italy) (4) Nicolas Covatti	7	(1,0,1,3,2)
13	(Poland) (3) Grzegorz Zengota	3	(0,0,1,0,2)
14	(Czech Republic) (9) Zdeněk Simota	2	(0,0,0,2,0)
15	(Germany) (15) Tobias Busch	2	(0,1,1,0,0)
16	(Latvia) (6) Maksims Bogdanovs	1	(0,R,R,1,R)
—	(Czech Republic) (17) Tomáš Suchánek	—	—
