= Sandro Wassermann =

German motorcycle speedway rider

- Born: 22 July 1998 (age 28); Illertissen, Germany
- Nationality: German

Career history

Germany
- 2022: Berghaupten
- 2023: Güstrow

Poland
- 2020–2021: Wittstock
- 2022: Wrocław
- 2023–2024: Landshut

Team honours
- 2016, 2017, 2018, 2023: Bundesliga title

Sandro Wassermann (born 22 July 1998) is a motorcycle speedway rider from Germany.

== Career ==
Wassermann was born in Illertissen, Germany and came to prominence when he won the 2014 Speedway Youth World Championship. The event was a 250cc class held at the Marian Spychała Speedway Stadium in Opole, Poland.

Wassermann represented Germany in the final of the 2016 European Pairs Speedway Championship.

Before AC Landshut joined the Team Speedway Polish Championship, Wassermann won three Bundesliga titles with the club in 2016, 2017 and 2018.

In 2023, Wassermann helped MC Güstrow win the Bundesliga title.
