= Robbie Kessler =

German speedway rider (born 1973)

- Born: 5 April 1973 (age 53); Neuwied, West Germany
- Nationality: German

Career history

Germany
- 1991–1992, 1997, 1999, 2006: Diedenbergen
- 2000–2001: Landshut
- 2003–2004, 2009–2010: Parchim/Wolfslake

Great Britain
- 1994, 1996–1997, 2000–2001: Sheffield Tigers
- 1999: King's Lynn Stars
- 2002: Hull Vikings
- 2003–2007: Stoke Potters
- 2007, 2010: Rye House Rockets
- 2007, 2009: Redcar Bears
- 2008: Mildenhall Fen Tigers
- 2008: Coventry Bees

Individual honours
- 1992, 1993: German Under-21 Champion

Team honours
- 2001: Premier Trophy Winner
- 2000: Premier League Fours Winner
- 2000, 2002: Premiership Winner
- 1994, 1996, 2000, 2004: German League Champion

Robert Kessler (born 5 April 1973 in Neuwied, West Germany) is a former motorcycle speedway rider, from Germany. He earned five international caps for the German national speedway team.

== Career ==
Kessler represented Germany at the Speedway World Team Cup. He was the German under-21 champion in 1992 and 1993.

Kessler started his British league career with Sheffield Tigers in 1994. He spent five seasons with them from 1994 to 2001, although in between he had a season with King's Lynn Stars. He then moved to Hull Vikings during the 2002 Premier League speedway season before switching to Stoke Potters in 2003.

Kessler's last season before retirement was in Britain, riding with the Rye House Rockets in 2010.

== Personal life ==
A mechanical engineer by trade, Robbie founded ROK Racing a speedway motor-cycle building and engine tuning business, in 2010.
