= Joachim Kugelmann =

German speedway rider

- Born: 18 August 1971 (age 55); Schongau, Germany
- Nationality: German

Career history
- 1997–2001, 2007: Landshut
- 1990-1991, 2002, 2006: Olching
- 2003–2005: Parchim/Wolfslake

Poland
- 2007: Miskolc
- 2008: Łódź

Great Britain
- 1999: Stoke Potters
- 2001: King's Lynn Stars
- 2002: Oxford Cheetahs
- 2005: Berwick Bandits

Joachim Kugelmann (born 18 August 1971) is a German motorcycle speedway rider. He earned six international caps for the German national speedway team.

== Career ==
Kugelmann rode in the 2001 Speedway World Cup and 2002 Speedway World Cup.

Kugelmann started his British leagues career riding for Stoke Potters during the 1999 Premier League speedway season. He then had spells with King's Lynn Stars and Oxford Cheetahs in 2001 and 2002 respectively, before finally riding for Berwick Bandits in 2005.
