= Rottalstadion =

Stadium in Pocking, Germany

- Location: Füssinger Str. 14, 94060 Pocking, Germany
- Coordinates: 48°23′34″N 13°18′24″E
- Capacity: 10,000
- Opened: 1953
- Length: 0.396 km

The Rottalstadion is a 10,000-capacity motorcycle speedway, association football and athletics stadium located in the southern area of Pocking, Germany. It hosts the speedway team MSC Pocking and the football team SV Pocking 1892.

== History ==
The Rottalstadion was built by members of the local motorsport club, shortly after World War II, on a gravel pit but the club dissolved before speedway took a permanent hold at the venue. It finally had an official opening in 1953 when FC Nürnberg met SSV Jahn Regensburg in a football match.

A new motorcycle club was created on 13 March 1962 and the founding members unanimously voted to join the DMV. Xaver Ziegler was instrumental in racing returning in June 1962, albeit on a sand track measuring a huge 760 meters. Events became a regular occurrence and a record crowd of 22,000 attended the stadium on Easter Sunday, 1967.

In 1974, a smaller conventional speedway track was built and on 30 March 1975, national teams from Poland, the Soviet Union, Sweden and West Germany competed in an international fixture. Several years later the MSC Pocking team would compete in the Bundesliga. The stadium hosted the semi finals of the 1977 Speedway World Pairs Championship, before it was awarded the final of the 1986 Speedway World Pairs Championship.

In 1993, a crowd of around 20,000 attended the 1993 Individual Speedway World Championship, which was significant because it was the last one-off final before the introduction of the Speedway Grand Prix.

In 1996 and 1998, the stadium hosted the prestigious Speedway Grand Prix of Germany, which were won by Hans Nielsen and Tony Rickardsson respectively.

During 2020, the track closed and fixtures were suspended due to the COVID-19 pandemic but reopened in 2021.

On 15 August 2023, the 396 metre track record was broken by Valentin Grobauer, who recorded 84.6 km/h.
