= 2003 European Speedway Club Champions' Cup =

European motorcycle speedway event

European Speedway Club Champions' Cup
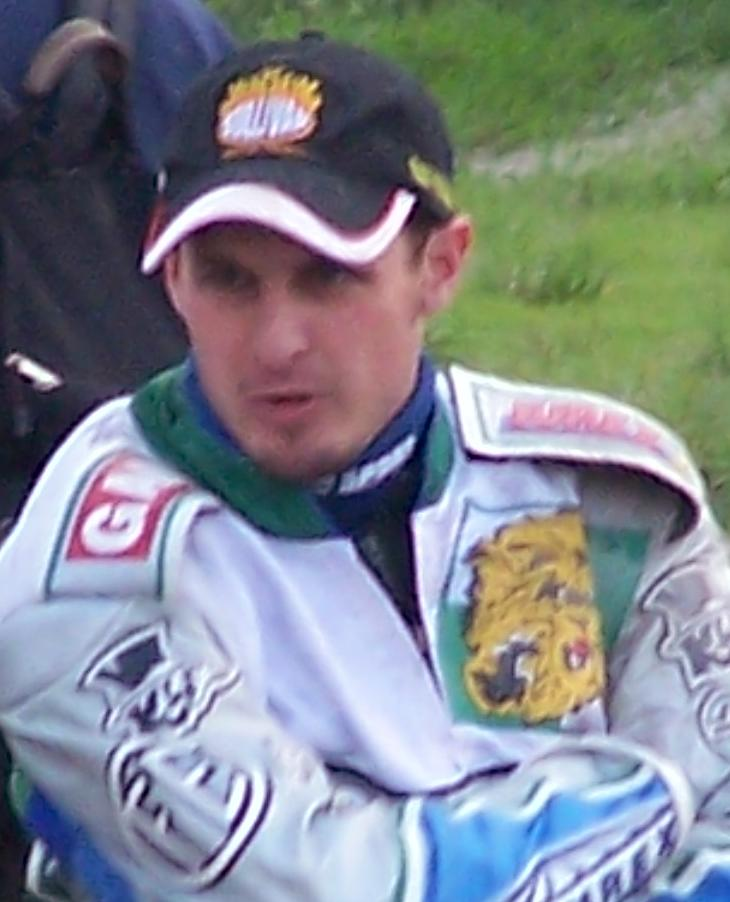
- Ryan Sullivan helped Mega-Lada Togliatti win the championship for the second consecutive year.
- Start date: 10 August
- End date: 27 September

The 2003 European Speedway Club Champions' Cup was the sixth motorcycle speedway championship for clubs competing in Europe. It was organised by the European Motorcycle Union (UEM). The competition was primarily for Eastern European teams and only featured Polish teams from three of the 'Big four' leagues, with the British, Swedish and Danish leagues choosing not to compete.

Mega-Lada Togliatti won the championship for the second consecutive year.

== Qualifying ==
AMTK Ljubljana qualified for the final

- 10 August 2003
- (Latvia) Latvijas Spidveja Centrs, Daugavpils

Pos.	Team	Pts.	Scorers
1	(Slovenia) AMTK Ljubljana	52	Matej Žagar 15, Jernej Kolenko 14, Izak Šantej 11, Ales Dolinar 11, Primoz Legan 1
2	(Latvia) Lokomotiv Daugavpils	36	Alexander Biznya 11, Kjasts Puodžuks 9, Nikolai Kokin 7, Denis Popovich 6, Leonid Paura 5
3	(Germany) MC Güstrow	26	Christian Hefenbrock 8, Steffen Mell 8, Michael Moller 5, Ronny Weis 5, Marco Muller 0
4	(Ukraine) SKA-Speedway Lviv	6	Aleksander Lyatosinsky 3, Igor Borisenko 3, Sergej Senko 0, Lubomir Vojtyk 0

== Final ==
- 27 September 2003
- (Hungary) Hajdú Volán Stadion, Debrecen

Pos.	Team	Pts.	Scorers
1	(Russia) Mega-Lada Togliatti	74	Rune Holta 20, Ryan Sullivan 17, Sergey Darkin 11, Oleg Kurguskin 15, Roman Poważny 11
2	(Hungary) Hajdu Volan Debrecen	66	Tomasz Bajerski 27, Attila Stefani 13, Sandor Tihanyi 11, Laszlo Szatmari 8, Norbert Magosi 7
3	(Slovenia) AMTK Ljubljana	45	Matej Zagar 18, Ales Dolinar 10, Jernej Kolenko 9, Izak Santej 6, Stanko Glavan 2
4	(Czech Republic) AMK Pardubice	43	Matej Ferjan 24, Radek Smolik 8, Jaroslav Petrak 6, Vladimir Visvader 4, Roman Andrusiv 1
5	(Poland) Polonia Bydgoszcz	34	Jacek Krzyżaniak 15, Michał Robacki 11, Marcin Jędrzejewski 3, Grzegorz Czechowski 3, Robert Uminski 2
