= Tobias Busch =

German speedway rider

- Born: 13 May 1988 (age 38); Stralsund, Germany
- Nationality: German

Career history

Germany
- 2005–2007, 2010–2012, 2022: Stralsund
- 2007–2008: Neuenknick

Great Britain
- 2016–2018: Redcar
- 2010: Edinburgh

Poland
- 2018: Krosno

Denmark
- 2008: Esbjerg
- 2012: Outrup

Team honours
- 2022: German Championship

Tobias Busch (born 13 May 1988 in Stralsund) is a German former speedway rider. He earned one international cap for the German national speedway team.

== Career ==
Busch started his British speedway career with the Edinburgh Monarchs in 2010. He joined the Redcar Bears in 2016. In 2017, he made his debut in the Astana Expo FIM Ice Speedway Gladiators World Championship Qualification round for the individual series which took place on 7 January in Ylitornio, Finland representing Germany scoring 4 points.

Busch announced his retirement at the end of the 2022 season, after helping MC Nordstern Stralsund win the German Championship.
