= German Grand Prix (disambiguation) =

German Grand Prix can refer to:

- German Grand Prix, a Formula One motor race
- German motorcycle Grand Prix
- Speedway Grand Prix of Germany
