= Bergring Arena =

Bergring Arena may refer to

- Teterower Bergring, a motorcycle race track in Germany opened in 1930, known as the mountain ring
- Bergring Arena (speedway), speedway stadium in Germany, formerly known as the Kellerholz Arena and adjacent to the mountain ring
