= FIM Flat Track World Championship =

- Category: Motorcycle Racing
- Country: International
- Region: Various
- Inaugural season: 2011

The FIM Flat Track World Championship is the premier competition organized by FIM on the sport of flat track racing. It takes place every year as a calendar competition on different locations across the world. It was first contested in 2011 and Italian rider Francesco Cecchini has won the championship a record 6 times in a row.

== Medalists ==
Year	Winners	Runner-up	3rd place
2011	ITA Marco Belli	GBR Tom Wooley	GBR Aidan Collins
2012	ITA Fabricio Vesprini	GBR Tom Wooley	ITA Emanuele Marzotto
2013	ITA Fabricio Vesprini	ITA Emanuele Marzotto	NED Rob Sijbring
2014	ITA Francesco Cecchini	ITA Emanuele Marzotto	GBR Aidan Collins
2015	ITA Francesco Cecchini	GBR Oliver Brindley	ITA Emanuele Marzotto
2016	ITA Francesco Cecchini	ITA Emanuele Marzotto	ESP Franc Serra
2017	ITA Francesco Cecchini	ESP Franc Serra	ESP Adrián Garín
2018	ITA Francesco Cecchini	ESP Gerard Bailo Serra	ESP Franc Serra
2019	ITA Francesco Cecchini	ESP Adrián Garín	AUT Manuel Hagleitner
2020	FIN Lasse Kurvinen	ITA Francesco Cecchini	ESP Ferrán Cardús
2021	FIN Lasse Kurvinen	ITA Kevin Corradetti	GER Markus Jell
2022	ESP Gerard Bailo	ITA Matteo Boncinelli	CZE Ervin Krajčovič
2023	CZE Ervin Krajčovič	ESP Gerard Bailo	ITA Matteo Boncinelli
2024	USA Sammy Halbert	CZE Ervin Krajčovič	FIN Lasse Kurvinen
2025	CZE Ervin Krajčovič	USA Sammy Halbert	CZE Ondřej Švédík

== See also ==
- FIM Supermoto World Championship
- Supermoto of Nations
