= Ruhpolding Speedway =

German motorcycle speedway team

MSC Ruhpolding

Club information
- Track address: Ruhpoldinger Speedway Stadion
- Country: Germany
- League: West German Championship

Major team honours
| West Germany runner-up | 1974, 1982 |

Ruhpolding Speedway was a German motorcycle speedway team called MSC Ruhpolding and a speedway track known as the Ruhpoldinger Speedway Stadion,, which was located in the eastern part of Ruhpolding, off Zeller Straße 32 (47°45′34″N 12°39′24″E).

== History ==
The Ruhpoldinger Speedway Stadion held important events. These included a qualifying round of the 1970 Speedway World Team Cup and a qualifying round of the Speedway World Championship in 1969 and 1983.

The team called MSC Ruhpolding participated in the West German Team Championship from 1974. They won the silver medal in the second Championship in 1974 and again eight years later in 1982.
