= Brokstedt =

- Municipality
- Coat of arms

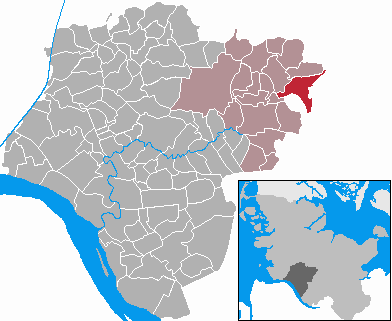
- Location of Brokstedt within Steinburg district
- Interactive map of Brokstedt
- Location within Germany Location within Schleswig-Holstein
- Coordinates: 53°58′N 9°49′E
- Country: Germany
- State: Schleswig-Holstein
- District: Steinburg
- Municipal assoc.: Kellinghusen
- Subdivisions: 2

Government
  - Mayor: Clemens Preine

Area
  - Total: 12.62 km^{2} (4.87 sq mi)
- Elevation: 21 m (69 ft)

Population (2025-12-31)
  - Total: 2,226
  - Density: 176.4/km^{2} (456.8/sq mi)
- Time zone: UTC+01:00 (CET)
  - Summer (DST): UTC+02:00 (CEST)
- Postal codes: 24616
- Dialling codes: 04324
- Vehicle registration: IZ
- Website: www.kellinghusen.de

Brokstedt is a municipality in the district of Steinburg, in Schleswig-Holstein, Germany.

== Transport ==
Brokstedt station serves the municipality as the railway station.

== Sport and leisure ==
The Holsteinring is a motorcycle speedway track that hosts the speedway team MSC Brokstedt. The association football team TSV Brokstedt 1926 play at the Am Sportpl ground.
