= Rostock Speedway =

German motorcycle speedway team

MC Neptun Rostock / MC Dynamo Roctock

Club information
- Track address: Rostock Speedwaystadion
- Country: East Germany / Germany
- Founded: 1957
- League: East German Championship

Club facts
- Track size: 364m

Major team honours
East German Champions	1969, 1970, 1971
East German Runners-up	1967, 1968

Rostock Speedway was an East German motorcycle speedway team called MC Neptun Rostock and then MC Dynamo Rostock and the speedway track known as the Rostock Speedwaystadion, which was located in the south west of Rostock, in Germany. The position of the stadium was off the Tannenweg road at (54°04′25″N 12°04′51″E), which is housing today.

== History ==
The facility was a 364-metre track, which opened in 1957. The team began racing as MC Neptun Rostock in the inaugural East German Team Speedway Championship in 1965 and secured the bronze medal. The following season the team raced as MC Dynamo Rostock and once again won the bronze medal. The track hosted the Ostseepokal Series (the Baltic Sea Cup).

The Danish international rider Poul Wissing was killed at the track on 1 October 1967, after crashing with Gerhard Uhlenbrock and Åke Andersson during a race.

After two consecutive silver medals from 1967 to 1968, the club experienced a golden era, by securing three East German Championships from 1969 to 1971.

On 11 March 1972, Henryk Glücklich set a new track record at the Rostock Speedwaystadion, recording 70.8sec.

The stadium was demolished in circa.2002, to make way for housing.
