= Bopfingen Speedway =

German motorcycle speedway team

MSC-Ipf Bopfingen

Club information
- Track address: Breitwangbahn
- Country: Germany
- Founded: 1972
- Closed: 1984
- League: West German championship

Major team honours
West German champion	1974
West German Runners-up	1975, 1978

Bopfingen Speedway was a German motorcycle speedway team called MSC-Ipf Bopfingen and a former speedway track known as the Breitwangbahn, which was located approximately 2 kilometres west of Bopfingen on Sandberg 1. The team were champions of West Germany in 1974.

== History ==
=== Breitwangbahn ===
The Breitwangbahn was a speedway track from 30 July 1972 until 1984. The venue hosted significant events, including qualifying rounds of the Speedway World Championship in 1977 and 1981 and a qualifying round of the Speedway World Team Cup in 1974.

=== MSC-Ipf Bopfingen ===
The team called MSC-Ipf Bopfingen competed in the West German Team Championship from 1974 until 1984. They became champions of West Germany after winning the title in 1974. The following year in 1975, they won the silver medal, a feat which they repeated in 1978.
