= Holsteinring =

Motorcycle speedway track in Brokstedt, Germany

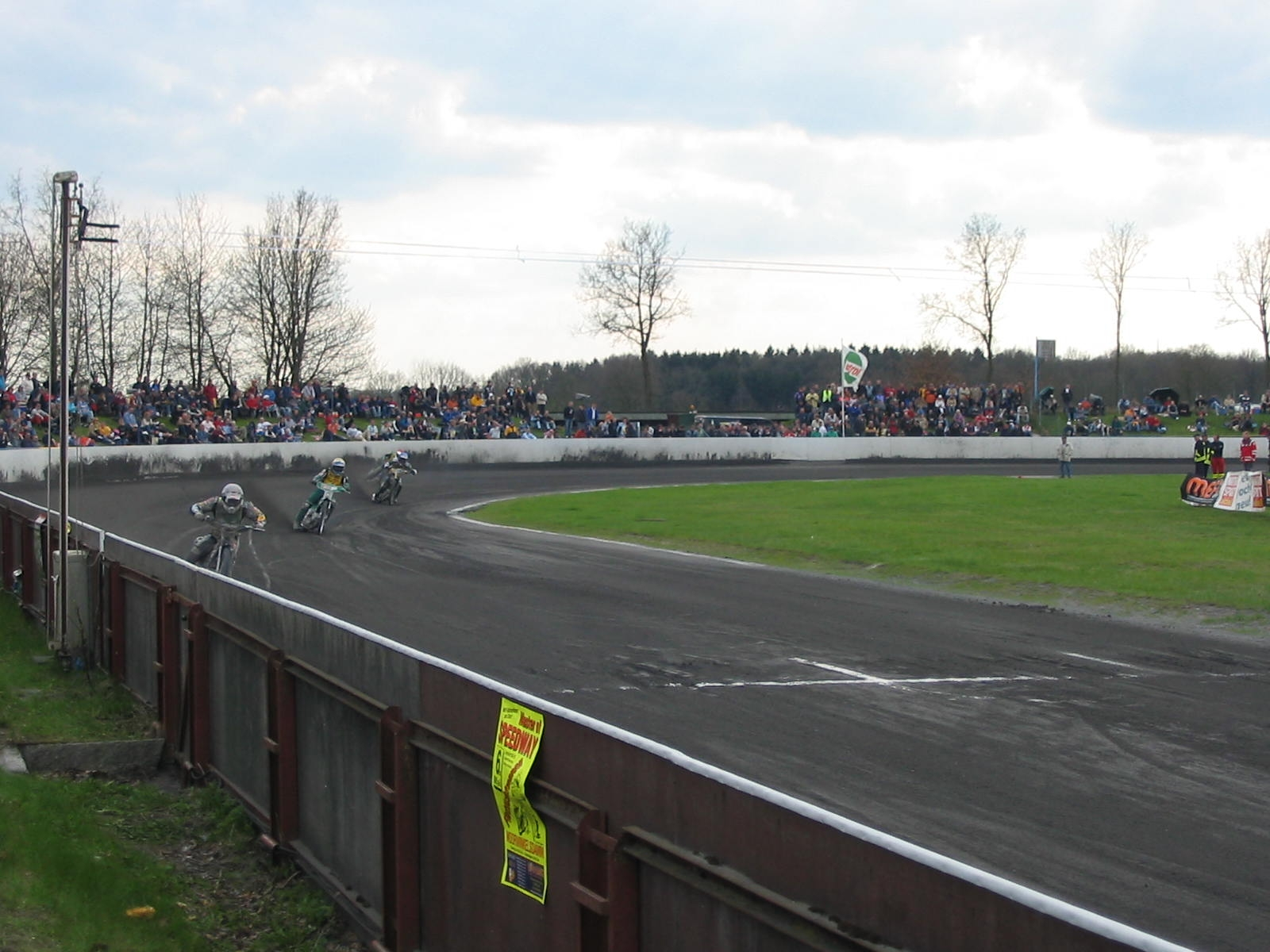
- Location: Dorfstraße 44, 24616 Brokstedt, Germany
- Coordinates: 53°59′38″N 9°47′58″E
- Capacity: 8,000
- Opened: 1975
- Length: 0.393 km

The Holsteinring is an 8,000 capacity motorcycle speedway track in Brokstedt, Germany. The stadium is located in the western outskirts of Brokstedt on the Dorfstraße road.

== History ==
Th stadium was built in 1975 and hosted the speedway team Team 70 Brokstedt formerly the Team 70 Neumünster, who moved from Neumünster to Brokstedt to race at the new stadium. The speedway team became MSC Brokstedt in 1983 and raced in the German Speedway Championship.

The stadium has been a significant venue for major speedway events, including the final of the 1994 Speedway World Team Cup.

On 3 October 2005, Aleš Dryml Jr. set a new track record of 67.90 seconds.

The final of the 2014 German Individual Speedway Championship took place at the Holsteinring and the MSC Brokstedt team won the Bundesliga championship title.
