= MSC Pocking =

German motorcycle speedway team

Club information
- Track address: Rottalstadion
- Country: Germany
- Founded: 1962
- League: Speedway Bundesliga
- Website: msc-pocking.de

Major team honours
West German bronze medal (x2)	1982, 1987

MSC Pocking is a German motorcycle speedway team based in Pocking, in the district of Passau, in Lower Bavaria, Germany.

== History ==
The club was founded on 13 March 1962 and the founding members unanimously voted to join the DMV. Xaver Ziegler was instrumental in racing returning in June 1962, albeit on a sand track measuring a huge 760 meters. Events became a regular occurrence and a record crowd of 22,000 attended the stadium on Easter Sunday, 1967.

The team competed in the West German Team Championship from circa.1975 to 1990. They won the team bronze in 1982 and again in 1987.

Following the German reunification, the team joined the Speedway Bundesliga/Superliga.
