= Cloppenburg Speedway =

German motorcycle speedway team

Club information
- Track address: MSC Arena Cloppenburg
- Country: Germany
- Founded: 1950
- League: German Bundesliga

Club facts
- Nickname: The Fighters

Major team honours
West German bronze medal	1973

Cloppenburg Speedway is a German motorcycle speedway team called MSC Cloppenburg and a speedway track known as the MSC Arena Cloppenburg, which is located in the eastern outskirts of Cloppenburg on Boschstraße.

== History ==
=== MSC Arena Cloppenburg ===
The MSC Arena Cloppenburg is the speedway track belonging to the MSC Cloppenburg and hosts an annual event called the Night of the Fights. It opened in 2010.

Previously the club raced at the Stadion an der Friesoyther Strasse until 9 July 2005, when they were evicted by BV Cloppenburg.

=== MSC Cloppenburg ===
The team called MSC Cloppenburg participated in the West German Team Championship from 1973 until 1990. They won the bronze medal in the inaugural Championship in 1973.

In 2010, the club opened their new stadium and the team returned to compete in the 2.Bundesliga, most recently in 2022 and 2023.
