= Speedway Grand Prix of Germany =

Speedway event that is a part of the Speedway Grand Prix Series

(Germany) German FIM Speedway Grand Prix
- Stadium: Ellermühle Speedway Stadium, Landshut
- Years: 15 (1995–1998, 2001, 2007–2008, 2016–present)
- Track: Permanent track
- Track Length: 390 m

Last Event (season 2026)
- Date: 2 May 2026
- Winner: (Poland) Kacper Woryna

The Speedway Grand Prix of Germany is a speedway event that is a part of the Speedway Grand Prix Series.

== History ==
The inaugural German Grand Prix was held at the Motorstadion Abensberg in 1995. From 2016 to 2023, the event was staged at the Bergring Arena in Teterow.

In 2024, Mikkel Michelsen won his maiden Grand Prix.

== Winners ==
	Season	City	Stadium	Winner
1	1995	Abensberg	Motorstadion	(Denmark) Tommy Knudsen	result
2	1996	Pocking	Rottalstadion	(Denmark) Hans Nielsen	result
3	1997	Landshut	Ellermühle	(Denmark) Hans Nielsen	result
4	1998	Pocking	Rottalstadion	(Sweden) Tony Rickardsson	result
5	2001	Berlin	F. L. Jahn Stadium	(Poland) Tomasz Gollob	result
6	2007	Gelsenkirchen	Veltins-Arena	(Sweden) Andreas Jonsson	result
7	2008	Bydgoszcz	Polonia Bydgoszcz Stadium*	(Poland) Tomasz Gollob	result
8	2016	Teterow	Bergring Arena	(Australia) Jason Doyle	result
9	2017	Teterow	Bergring Arena	(Slovenia) Matej Žagar	result
10	2018	Teterow	Bergring Arena	(United Kingdom) Tai Woffinden	result
11	2019	Teterow	Bergring Arena	(Poland) Maciej Janowski	result
12	2022	Teterow	Bergring Arena	(Poland) Patryk Dudek	result
13	2023	Teterow	Bergring Arena	(Poland) Bartosz Zmarzlik	result
14	2024	Landshut	Ellermühle	(Denmark) Mikkel Michelsen	result
15	2025	Landshut	Ellermühle	(Poland) Bartosz Zmarzlik	result

* Due to inclement weather, the FIM deemed that track at the Veltins-Arena in Gelsenkirchen to be unsafe and the German GP was re-staged a week later in Bydgoszcz, Poland.

== Most wins ==
(Denmark) Hans Nielsen & (Poland) Tomasz Gollob/Bartosz Zmarzlik - 2 times
