= Meissen Speedway Stadium =

Stadium in Meissen, Germany

- Interactive map of Meissen Speedway Stadium
- Location: 01662 Meissen, Germany
- Coordinates: 51°09′35″N 13°30′13″E
- Field size: 394 metres

Meissen Speedway Stadium (German: Meißen Speedwaystadion) is a motorcycle speedway stadium in Meissen, Germany. The stadium is located on the eastern side of the town, on the Zaschendorfer Straße. The Motorsportclub Meissen e.V use the facility.

== History ==
The stadium was selected as the venue for a round of the Speedway World Team Cup in 1965 and for multiple qualifying rounds of the Speedway World Championship (the first in 1966). Additionally, it hosted the semi-final of the 1969 Speedway World Pairs Championship.

On 2 October 2004, the 394 metre track record was broken by Ronny Weis, who recorded 68.20 sec.

The stadium was the first speedway stadium to open in Germany during 2020, following the closure of all tracks during the COVID-19 pandemic.

== MC Meissen ==
The speedway team MC Meissen are two-times champions of East Germany, having won the first East German Speedway Championship in 1965 and then again in 1976.

== Former track records ==
- 464m - Josef Hofmeister 89.6 sec (1960)
- 464m - Bedřich Slaný 88.8 sec
- 464m - Boris Samorodov 87.5 sec
- 391m - Boris Samorodov 81.7 sec (8 May 1965)
- 391m - Igor Plekhanov 81.4 sec (1 August 1965)
- 391m - Antonín Kasper Sr. 81.4 sec (7 October 1965)
