= Pocking =

- Town
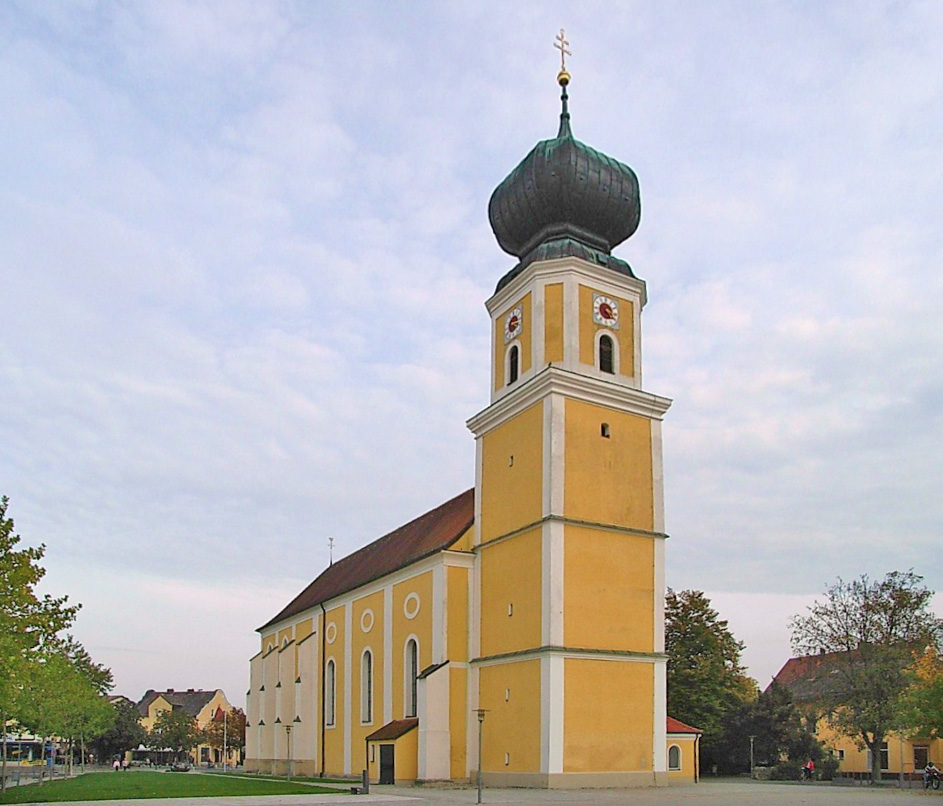
- Church of Saint Ulrich

- Coat of arms

- Location of Pocking within Passau district
- Interactive map of Pocking
- Location within Germany Location within Bavaria
- Coordinates: 48°24′N 13°19′E
- Country: Germany
- State: Bavaria
- Admin. region: Niederbayern
- District: Passau

Government
  - Mayor (2020–26): Franz Krah

Area
  - Total: 68.86 km^{2} (26.59 sq mi)
- Elevation: 323 m (1,060 ft)

Population (2025-12-31)
  - Total: 16,296
  - Density: 236.7/km^{2} (612.9/sq mi)
- Time zone: UTC+01:00 (CET)
  - Summer (DST): UTC+02:00 (CEST)
- Postal codes: 94060
- Dialling codes: 08531
- Vehicle registration: PA
- Website: www.pocking.de

Pocking (German: [ˈpɔkɪŋ]; Central Bavarian: Bocking) is a town in the district of Passau, in Lower Bavaria, Germany. It is situated about 30 km south-west of Passau, close to the Austrian border.

== History ==
A Roman settlement was founded in the area of Pocking as early as the 1st century AD. The Bajuwaren tribe settled around Pocking in the 6th century AD. In 820 AD Pocking was first mentioned in a historic document. Since 1824 Pocking forms its own political community and in 1971 it was granted the privileges of a town.

During the Nazi regime a side camp of the Flossenbürg concentration camp was set up in Pocking. After World War II the second largest DP camp ("displaced persons") in Germany was located in Pocking. In 1946 the camp housed 7,645 people, mostly of Jewish heritage. It was disbanded in 1949.

The Rottal area to which Pocking belongs is famous for its horse breeding. That is also why the coat of arms of Pocking includes the head of a horse. The other symbols relate to the history of the town and the different villages that formed the political community of Pocking.

== Mayors ==
Since his election in 2008 Franz Krah (Independent citizens) is the mayor of Pocking, succeeding Josef Jakob (CSU). Krah was reelected in March 2014 with 82.01% of the votes.

== Solarpark ==
In April 2006, Pocking Solar Park, the at this time world's largest connected solar power plant, was opened in Pocking. The plant produces 10 megawatt peak, has 62,500 photovoltaic cells and cost approximately 40 million euros.

== Sport ==
The Rottalstadion is a 10,000-capacity motorcycle speedway, association football and athletics stadium located in the southern area of Pocking. It hosts the speedway team MSC Pocking and the football team SV Pocking 1892.

== Education ==
Education in Pocking covers all main levels within a small town setting. Children attend local primary schools before moving to either the Wilhelm Diess Gymnasium, or the more practical Mittelschule Pocking, with additional support available at special education centres, The town also offers adult learning through Volkshochschule.

Schools include:

- Wilhelm-Diess-Gymnasium

== Notable people ==
- Michael Ammermüller (born 1986), race car driver
