= Germany national speedway team =

German national motorcycle speedway team

Germany
- Association: German Motor Union; Deutscher Motor Sport Bund
- FIM code: DMSB
- Nation colour: Black, Red, Yellow
- SWC wins: 0

The Germany national speedway team are one of the teams that compete in international team motorcycle speedway.

== History ==
The West Germany national speedway team competed in the inaugural Speedway World Team Cup in 1960 and the following year in 1961, the East Germany national speedway team competed in the World Cup for the first time.

Traditionally the West German team was much stronger and produced the majority of the leading riders from the German nations. West Germany and East Germany became the Germany national speedway team in 1991, following the events that led to the German reunification between 1989 and 1991.

The German team reached the final of the World Team Cup in 1994, 1996, 1997 and 1998 but failed to make any impact over the next two decades, until they competed in consecutive finals of the Speedway of Nations in 2018 and 2019.

== Major tournament finals ==
=== World Team Championships ===
Year	Venue	Standings (Pts)	Riders	Pts
1994	(Germany); Brokstedt; Holsteinring Brokstedt	1. Sweden (23); 2. Poland (20); 3. Denmark (17); 4. Australia (17); 5. United States (17); 6. Germany (16); = England (16)	Gerd Riss	12
1994	(Germany); Brokstedt; Holsteinring Brokstedt	1. Sweden (23); 2. Poland (20); 3. Denmark (17); 4. Australia (17); 5. United States (17); 6. Germany (16); = England (16)	Andre Pollehn	11+2
1994	(Germany); Brokstedt; Holsteinring Brokstedt	1. Sweden (23); 2. Poland (20); 3. Denmark (17); 4. Australia (17); 5. United States (17); 6. Germany (16); = England (16)	Robert Barth	1
1996	(Germany); Diedenbergen; Speedway Diedenbergen	1. Poland (27); 2. Russia (22); 3. Denmark (21); 4. Germany (20); 5. Sweden (14); 6. (United Kingdom) Great Britain (12); 7. Hungary (9)	Gerd Riss	14
1996	(Germany); Diedenbergen; Speedway Diedenbergen	1. Poland (27); 2. Russia (22); 3. Denmark (21); 4. Germany (20); 5. Sweden (14); 6. (United Kingdom) Great Britain (12); 7. Hungary (9)	Robert Barth	6
1996	(Germany); Diedenbergen; Speedway Diedenbergen	1. Poland (27); 2. Russia (22); 3. Denmark (21); 4. Germany (20); 5. Sweden (14); 6. (United Kingdom) Great Britain (12); 7. Hungary (9)	Robbie Kessler	0
1997	(Poland); Piła; Stadion Żużlowy Centrum	1. Denmark (27); 2. Poland (25); 3. Sweden (21); 4. Germany (17); 5. Czech Republic (16); 6. Russia (10); 7. Hungary (9)	Robert Barth	9
1997	(Poland); Piła; Stadion Żużlowy Centrum	1. Denmark (27); 2. Poland (25); 3. Sweden (21); 4. Germany (17); 5. Czech Republic (16); 6. Russia (10); 7. Hungary (9)	Robbie Kessler	8
1997	(Poland); Piła; Stadion Żużlowy Centrum	1. Denmark (27); 2. Poland (25); 3. Sweden (21); 4. Germany (17); 5. Czech Republic (16); 6. Russia (10); 7. Hungary (9)	Gerd Riss	0
1998	(Denmark); Vojens; Vojens Speedway Center	1. United States (28); 2. Sweden (24); 3. Denmark (23); 4. Poland (17); 5. Germany (14); 6. Czech Republic (14); 7. Hungary (6)	Matthias Kröger	7
1998	(Denmark); Vojens; Vojens Speedway Center	1. United States (28); 2. Sweden (24); 3. Denmark (23); 4. Poland (17); 5. Germany (14); 6. Czech Republic (14); 7. Hungary (6)	Robert Barth	6
1998	(Denmark); Vojens; Vojens Speedway Center	1. United States (28); 2. Sweden (24); 3. Denmark (23); 4. Poland (17); 5. Germany (14); 6. Czech Republic (14); 7. Hungary (6)	Gerd Riss	1
2018	(Poland); Wrocław; Olympic Stadium	1. Russia (45); 2. (United Kingdom) Great Britain (46); 3. Poland (36); 4. Australia (35); 5. Denmark (35); 6. Sweden (32); 7. Germany (23)	Martin Smolinski	13
2018	(Poland); Wrocław; Olympic Stadium	1. Russia (45); 2. (United Kingdom) Great Britain (46); 3. Poland (36); 4. Australia (35); 5. Denmark (35); 6. Sweden (32); 7. Germany (23)	Kai Huckenbeck	9
2018	(Poland); Wrocław; Olympic Stadium	1. Russia (45); 2. (United Kingdom) Great Britain (46); 3. Poland (36); 4. Australia (35); 5. Denmark (35); 6. Sweden (32); 7. Germany (23)	Michael Härtel	1
2019	(Russia); Tolyatti; Anatoly Stepanov Stadium	1. Poland (47); 2. Russia (45); 3. Australia (41); 4. Denmark (37); 5. Sweden (35); 6. Germany (30); 7. (United Kingdom) Great Britain (16)	Kai Huckenbeck	20
2019	(Russia); Tolyatti; Anatoly Stepanov Stadium	1. Poland (47); 2. Russia (45); 3. Australia (41); 4. Denmark (37); 5. Sweden (35); 6. Germany (30); 7. (United Kingdom) Great Britain (16)	Erik Riss	10
2019	(Russia); Tolyatti; Anatoly Stepanov Stadium	1. Poland (47); 2. Russia (45); 3. Australia (41); 4. Denmark (37); 5. Sweden (35); 6. Germany (30); 7. (United Kingdom) Great Britain (16)	Lukas Fienhage	0
2024	(England); Manchester; National Speedway Stadium	1. (United Kingdom) Great Britain (35+5+7); 2. Australia (36+2); 3. Sweden (27+4); 4. Germany (26); 5. Poland (24); 6. Denmark (21); 7. Latvia (20)	Kai Huckenbeck	16
2024	(England); Manchester; National Speedway Stadium	1. (United Kingdom) Great Britain (35+5+7); 2. Australia (36+2); 3. Sweden (27+4); 4. Germany (26); 5. Poland (24); 6. Denmark (21); 7. Latvia (20)	Norick Blödorn	10

== International caps (as of 2022) ==
Since the advent of the Speedway Grand Prix era, international caps earned by riders is largely restricted to international competitions, whereas previously test matches between two teams were a regular occurrence. This means that the number of caps earned by a rider has decreased in the modern era.

Rider	Caps
Busch, Tobias	1
Dilger, Max	3
Facher, Frank	2
Hefenbrock, Christian	10
Katt, Stephan	1
Kessler, Robbie	5
Kröger, Matthias	6
Kroner, Tobias	9
Kugelmann, Joachim	6
Lausch, Klaus	2*
Maier, Karl	1*
Mell, Steffen	2
Pelzmann, Carsten	3*
Pingel, Jorg	2
Pollehn, Andre	4*
Riss, Gerd	12*
Smolinski, Martin	12
Stange, Tommy	8
Wölbert, Kevin	6
Wolter, Mirko	4

- Asterisk indicates also earned caps for West Germany

== See also ==
- German Individual Speedway Championship
- German Speedway Championship
- East Germany national speedway team
- West Germany national speedway team
