= Neuenknick Speedway =

German motorcycle speedway team

SC Neuenknick e.V.
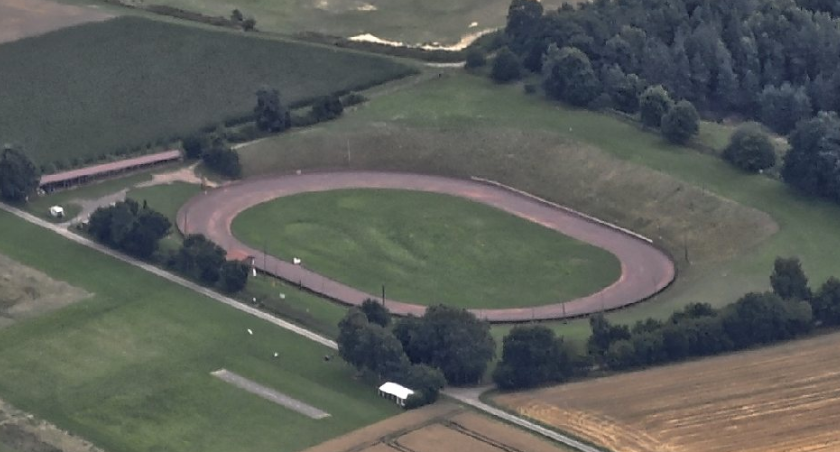
- Neuenknick Speedway track

Club information
- Track address: Stadion Lindenau
- Country: Germany
- Founded: 1981
- League: Speedway Bundesliga
- Website: www.sc-neuenknick.com

Club facts
- Track size: 357m

Major team honours
Bundesliga Runners-up (x3)	1994, 1995, 1996

Neuenknick Speedway is a German motorcycle speedway team called SC Neuenknick and speedway track known as the Stadion Lindenau, which is located approximately 12 kilometres north east of Petershagen on Brennwisk 40.

== History ==
The facility, a 357-metre track, has hosted important events since 1981, including a qualifying round of the Speedway World Championship in 1988.

The team raced in the Speedway Bundesliga and won three consecutive silver medals from 1994 until 1996.

Ten years later in 2006, they won the Bundesliga bronze medal. Although a team do not currently compete in the Bundesliga, regular events are still held at the track such as the 2023 Easter 6er.
