= MSC Brokstedt =

German motorcycle speedway team

Club information
- Track address: Holsteinring
- Country: Germany
- Founded: 1970/1983
- League: Speedway Bundesliga
- Website: www.mscbrokstedt.de

Club facts
- Nickname: Vikings
- Track size: 393m

Major team honours
| Bundesliga champions (x6) | 1980, 1981, 1997, 2014, 2019, 2021 |
| Bundesliga Runners-up (x9) | 1976, 1977, 1987, 1993, 1998, 2000, 2003, 2016, 2017 |
| West German Runners-up (x1) | 1987 |

MSC Brokstedt is a German motorcycle speedway team based in Brokstedt, Steinburg, Germany.

== History ==
=== Team 70 Neumünster ===
The origins of the Brokstedt speedway team began with a club called Team 70 Neumünster who were founded in 1970 and were the first champions of West Germany in 1973. They played their home fixtures at the VfR-Stadion an der Geerdtsstraße (today called the Grümmi-Arena) in Neumünster.

=== Team 70 Brokstedt ===
In 1975, the Holsteinring was constructed and Team 70 Neumünster moved to the new stadium in Brokstedt becoming Team 70 Brokstedt. The team won further West German Championships in 1980 and 1981. The legendary German rider Egon Müller rode for the club.

=== MSC Brokstedt ===
The MSC Brokstedt was founded in 1983 taking over the running of the speedway club. The team are four-times champions of Germany, having won the Speedway Bundesliga in 1997, 2014, 2019 and 2021.

In 2022, the MSC entered into a cooperation of promotion and training with Polish side Stal Gorzów Wielkopolski.
