= MSC Olching =

German motorcycle speedway team

Club information
- Track address: Olching Speedwaybahn
- Country: Germany
- Founded: 12 October 1950
- League: Speedway Bundesliga
- Website: www.msco.de

Club facts
- Track size: 390m

Major team honours
Bundesliga champions (x4)	1992, 2006, 2007, 2008
Bundesliga Runners-up (x3)	2002, 2022, 2023
West German Runners-up (x1)	1979

MSC Olching is a German motorcycle speedway team based in Olching, Fürstenfeldbruck, Bavaria, Germany.

The club was founded on 12 October 1950, although the speedway track did not open until 24 June 1951, when 15,000 specatators watched the first match.

The team are four-times champions of Germany, having won the Speedway Bundesliga in 1992, 2006, 2007 and 2008.
