= Bergring Arena (speedway) =

Speedway arena in Teterow, Germany

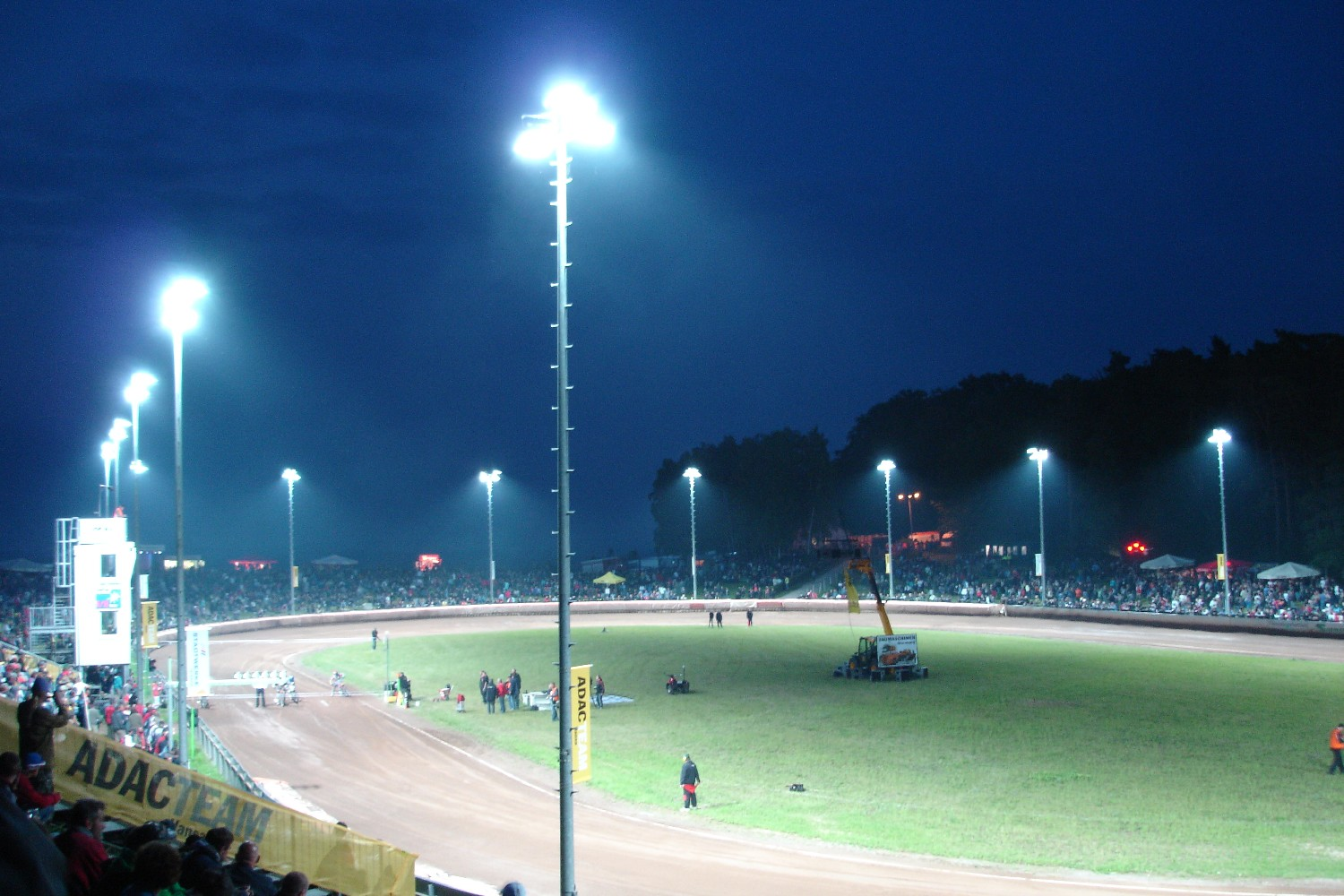
- Speedway riders prepare for a race at the Bergring-Arena
- Location: Appelhäger Chaussee 1, Teterow, Germany, 17166
- Coordinates: 53°47′35″N 12°33′02″E
- Capacity: 18,000
- Operator: Motorcycle speedway
- Opened: 18 May 2002
- Length: 314 m (0.195 mi)
- Race lap record: 58.06 sec (Matej Žagar, (Svn), 2017)

The Bergring Arena formerly the Kellerholz Arena is a 18,000-capacity multi-use stadium in Teterow, Germany. It hosts one of the rounds of the Speedway Grand Prix, which is the premier world event in motorcycle speedway. The speedway track is located adjacent to the famous Teterower Bergring (mountain ring).

== History ==
The stadium opened on 18 May 2002 as the Kellerholz Arena and the speedway track has a circumference of 314 metres which cost €270,000 to lay.

On 23 May 2010, the Arena was renamed the Bergring Arena, which was slightly confusing because the adjacent mountain ring circuit is also known as the Berging Arena.

The stadium has been used as the venue for the World Championship round known as the Speedway Grand Prix of Germany from 2016 to 2019. In 2020, the Grand Prix did not take place due to the COVID-19 pandemic. However the event made a return for the 2022 Speedway Grand Prix.

The track record was broken in 2017 by Australian Ty Proctor (59.75 sec) on 22 May 2010 but it was bettered by Matej Žagar who recorded 58.06 sec on 9 September 2017.

== MC Bergring Teterow ==
The speedway team MC Bergring Teterow competed in the East German Team Championship from circa.1979 to 1990. They won the team silver in 1990, after previously winning the team bronze in 1987 and 1989 respectively. The team did not have a home track because the mountain ring circuit was unsuitable for conventional oval racing.

Following the German reunification, the team joined the Speedway Bundesliga/Superliga before finally being able to race on a purpose built track from 2002. They won the Bundesliga silver medal in 2005.

== Gallery ==
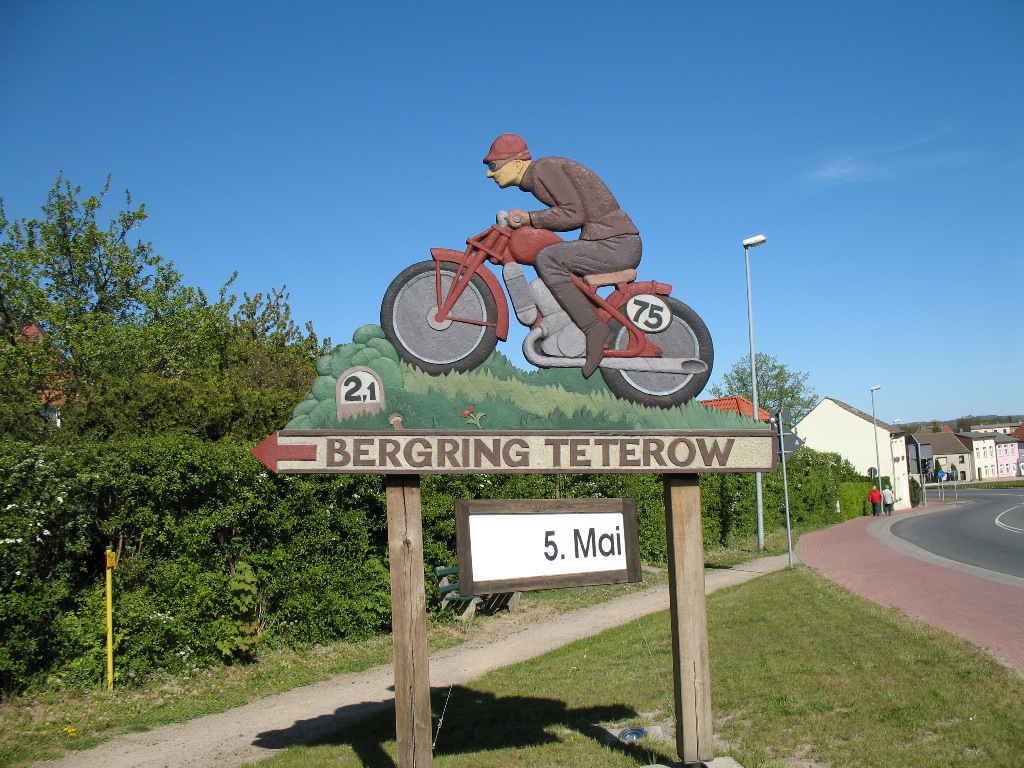

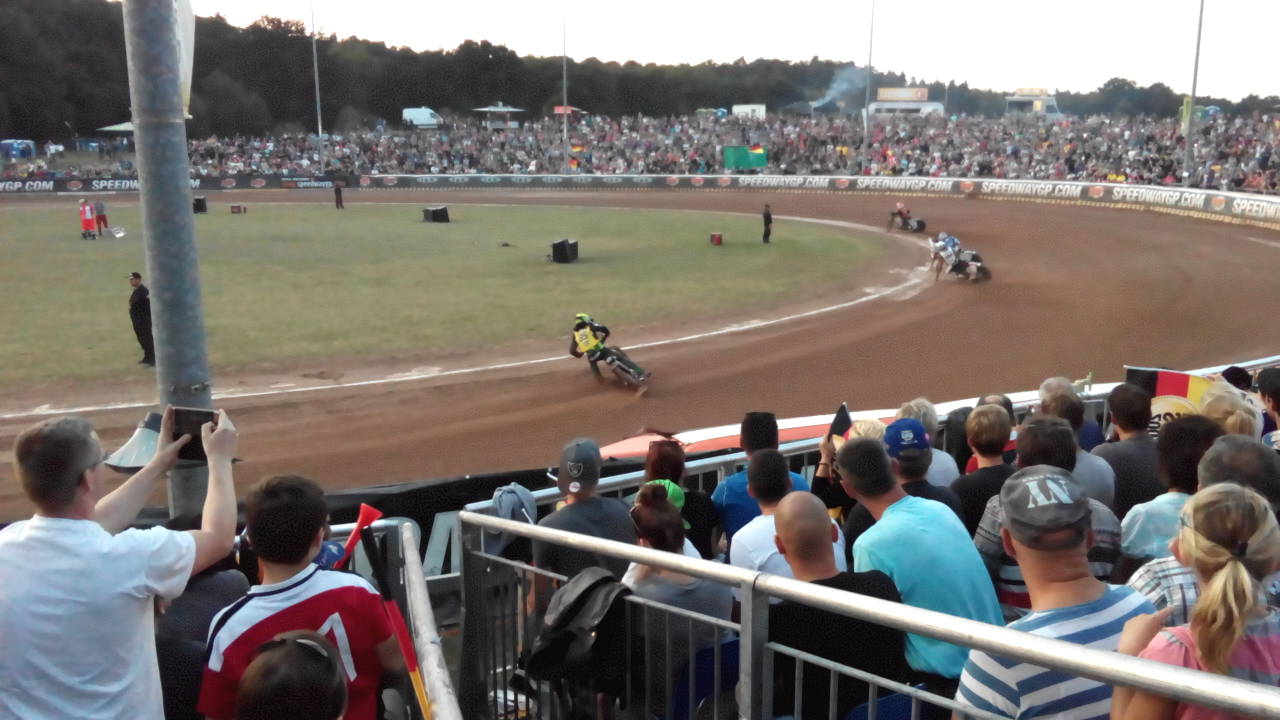

== See also ==
- Speedway Grand Prix of Germany
