= AC Landshut =

German motorcycle speedway team

Automobilclub Landshut e.V. im ADAC
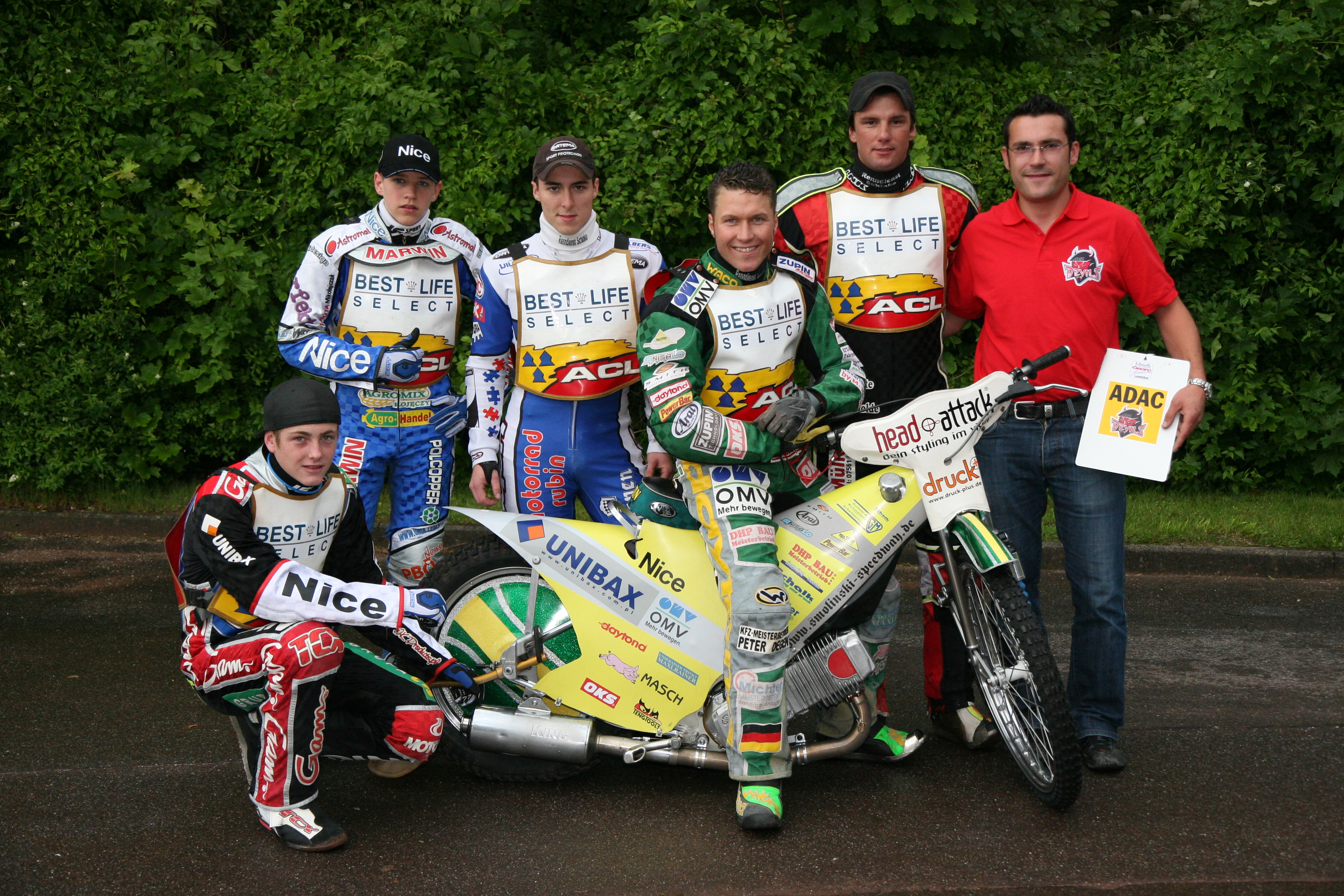
- The 2009 Devils team, led by Martin Smolinski (seated)

Club information
- Track address: Ellermühle Speedway Stadium
- Country: Germany
- Founded: 22 October 1922
- Team manager: Klaus Zwerschina/Slawomir Kryjom
- Team captain: Martin Smolinski
- League: Polish 1. Liga
- Website: speedway-landshut.de

Club facts
- Colours: Black & Red
- Nickname: Devils
- Track size: 390m

Major team honours
Bundesliga Champions (12x)	1991, 1993, 1999, 2000, 2009, 2010, 2011, 2012, 2013, 2016, 2017, 2018
West German Champions (7x)	1977, 1978, 1979, 1982, 1984, 1986, 1989
Bundesliga Runners-up (6x)	1992, 2001, 2014, 2015, 2019, 2021
West German Runners-up (5x)	1980, 1981, 1983, 1988, 1990

AC Landshut is a German automobile and motorcycle club best known for its motorcycle speedway team Landshut Devils, based in Landshut, Bavaria.

== History ==
It was founded by ADAC members in 1922 and has won a record 12 German Bundesliga championships and a record 7 West German Championships (1973-1990). Since 1975 they have raced at the Ellermühle Speedway Stadium.

Due to the suspension of the German Speedway Bundesliga due to the COVID-19 pandemic in 2020, the club joined the Polish 1. Liga in 2021.

The club reached the play offs of 1.Liga during the 2022 Polish Speedway season and remained in the league for the 2023 season.

== Teams ==
=== Current team ===
2023 squad

- (Germany) Martin Smolinski
- (Germany) Erik Riss
- (Sweden) Kim Nilsson
- (Germany) Kai Huckenbeck
- (France) Dimitri Bergé
- (Germany) Norick Blödorn
- (Germany) Sandro Wassermann
- (Germany) Timo Hildebrand
- (Germany) Lukas Baumann
- (Germany) Erik Bachhuber
- (Germany) Maximilian Troidl
- (Germany) Julian Bielmeier

=== Previous teams ===
Extended content

2022 squad

- (Germany) Erik Riss
- (Germany) Kai Huckenbeck
- (Germany) Mario Niedermaier
- (Denmark) Mads Hansen
- (France) Dimitri Bergé
- (Germany) Norick Blödorn
- (Germany) Erik Bachhuber
- (Sweden) Kim Nilsson
- (Germany) Valentin Grobauer
