= MC Nordstern Stralsund =

German motorcycle speedway team

Club information
- Track address: Paul Greifzu Stadium
- Country: Germany
- Founded: 1958
- League: Speedway Bundesliga
- Website: www.mcn-stralsund.de/de/home/home.php

Club facts
- Nickname: Northern Stars
- Track size: 385m

Major team honours
Bundesliga champions (x2)	2015, 2022
Bundesliga Runners-up (x1)	2012

MC Nordstern Stralsund is a German motorcycle speedway team based in Stralsund, Germany.

Founded in 1958, the first race meeting at the Paul Greifzu Stadium took place on 4 May 1958. The team raced in the East German Championship and as MC Dynamo Nordstern Stralsund, won four consecutive championship bronze medals from 1972 until 1975.

In 1977, Nordstern's Hartmut Ernst won the East German Individual Championship and from 1978 to 1983 the team won four more team bronze medals.

The team are two-times champions of Germany, having won the Speedway Bundesliga in 2015 and 2022.
