= Speedway Wolfslake =

German motorcycle speedway team

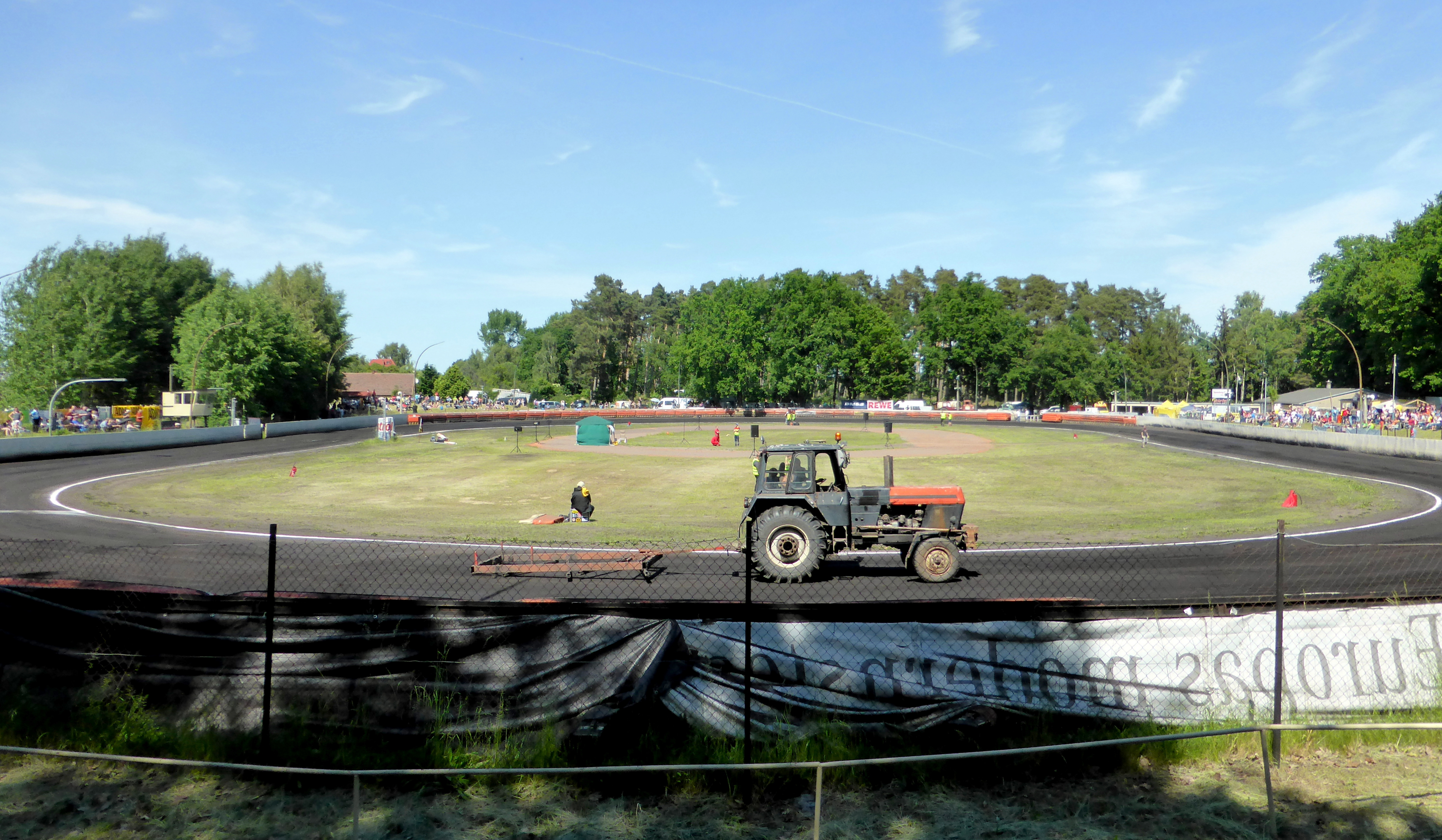
- The Eichenring

Club information
- Track address: Eichenring
- Country: Germany
- Founded: 1980
- League: Speedway Bundesliga
- Website: speedwayteam-wolfslake.de

Club facts
- Track size: 335m

Major team honours
Bundesliga champions	2004
Bundesliga Runners-up (x3)	2009, 2011, 2013

Speedway Wolfslake is a German motorcycle speedway team who race at the Eichenring, 30 kilometres northwest of Berlin in Germany. The track is located in the Krämerpfuhl forest on Am Krämerwald 6, 16727 Nr. Oberkrämer.

== History ==
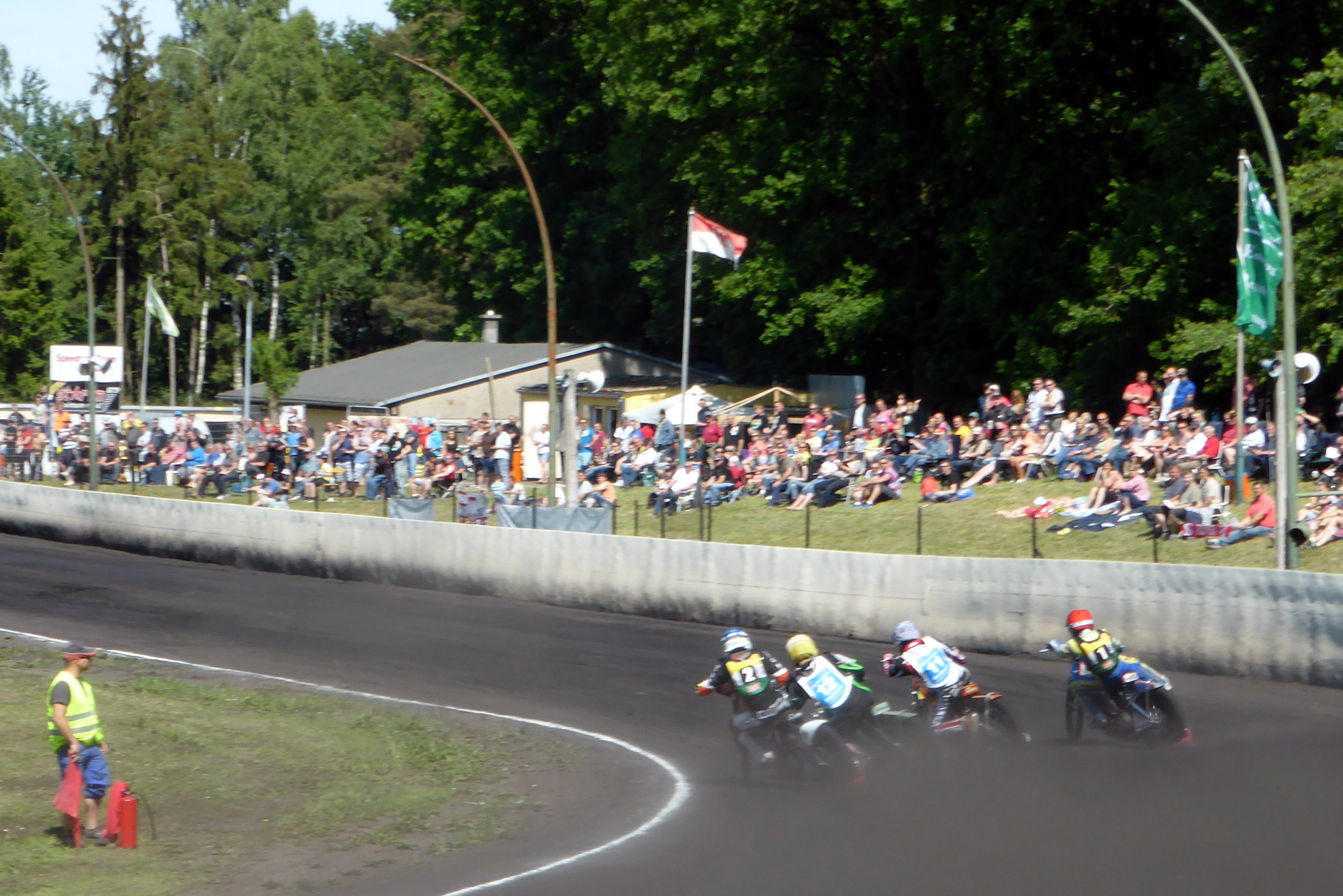
Bundesliga match, Wolfslake vs Stralsund 2015

Speedway was founded at the Eichenring in 1980, although the first official race meeting took place after the sand track was replaced by a regulation size 335 metres circuit in 1981. The opening meeting attracted 15,000 spectators on 29 August 1981.

The team began racing as MC Eichenring Wolfslake and hosted the Peace and Friendship Cup three times in 1983, 1986 and 1988. The stadium hosted a qualifying round of the 1991 Speedway Under-21 World Championship.

The team began racing in the Speedway Bundesliga after the German reunification and in March 1993, the club changed names to Speedway Team Berlin-Wolfslake.

The 335 metre track record was broken by Peter Karlsson, who recorded 63.30 sec.

Between 2002 and 2005 the team merged with MC Mecklenburgring Parchim and won the 2004 Bundesliga as RG Parchim/Wolfslake. The club reverted to its former name, ST Berlin Wolfslake and from 2008 to 2014 finished on the podium in 6 out of 7 championships.
