= Wittstock Speedway =

German motorcycle speedway team

Club information
- Track address: Speedwaybahn Heidering Wittstock
- Country: Germany
- Founded: 1961/2012
- League: Speedway Bundesliga
- Website: speedwayteam-wittstock.de

Club facts
- Nickname: Wolves
- Track size: 399m

Major team honours
Bundesliga Runners-up	2018

Wittstock Speedway is a German motorcycle speedway team who race at the Speedwaybahn Heidering Wittstock, 4 kilometres south of Wittstock in the Ostprignitz-Ruppin district of Brandenburg, Germany. The track is located off the Bohnekampweg or the Am Weinberg, 16909.

== History ==
Speedway in Wittstock has taken place through three definitive periods, The first was with a team competing in the East German Championship from 1982 to 1985.

The second arrived when Speedway Wolfslake ran into financial difficulties during the early 1990s, which forced many of Wolfslake's members to leave the club. They brought back speedway in Wittstock under the MC Heidering and competed in the Bundesliga from 1996 to 2001. The last competition organised by MC Heidering took place in 2007.

The third was again intrinsically linked with the Wolfslake club, when in 2012, after mergers, problems and renames, Wolfslake members (and construction entrepreneurs) Fritz and Franz Mauer decided to leave and reform the Wittstock club once again. On 28 June 2012, they formed MSC Wölfe Wittstock and returned to the Bundesliga.

On 8 October 2016, the 400 metre track record was broken by Matej Žagar, who recorded 68.29 sec.

From 2017 until 2019 the team finished on the Bundesliga podium but with the Budesliga shutting down for the 2020 season, due to the COVID-19 pandemic, the club competed in the 2. Liga during the 2020 Polish speedway season. They also raced in the Polish league during 2021 but were refused a licence to race in Poland for 2022.
