= MSC Diedenbergen =

German motorcycle speedway team

Club information
- Track address: Rhein-Main Arena
- Country: Germany
- Founded: 1958
- League: Speedway Bundesliga
- Website: webmaster12799.wixsite.com/msc-diedenbergen

Club facts
- Nickname: White Tigers
- Track size: 400m

Major team honours
Bundesliga champions (x6)	1994, 1995, 1996, 1998, 2001, 2005
West German Champions (x4)	1985, 1987, 1988, 1990
Bundesliga Runners-up (x5)	1991, 1997, 1999, 2006, 2008
West German Runners-up (x1)	1989

MSC Diedenbergen is a German motorcycle speedway team based in Hofheim am Taunus, Nr. Diedenbergen, Germany.

The team are six-times champions of Germany, having won the Speedway Bundesliga in 1994, 1995, 1996, 1998, 2001 and 2005. They were also four-times champions of the former West Germany.
