= German Team Speedway Championship =

Annual German national speedway competition

German Speedway Championship
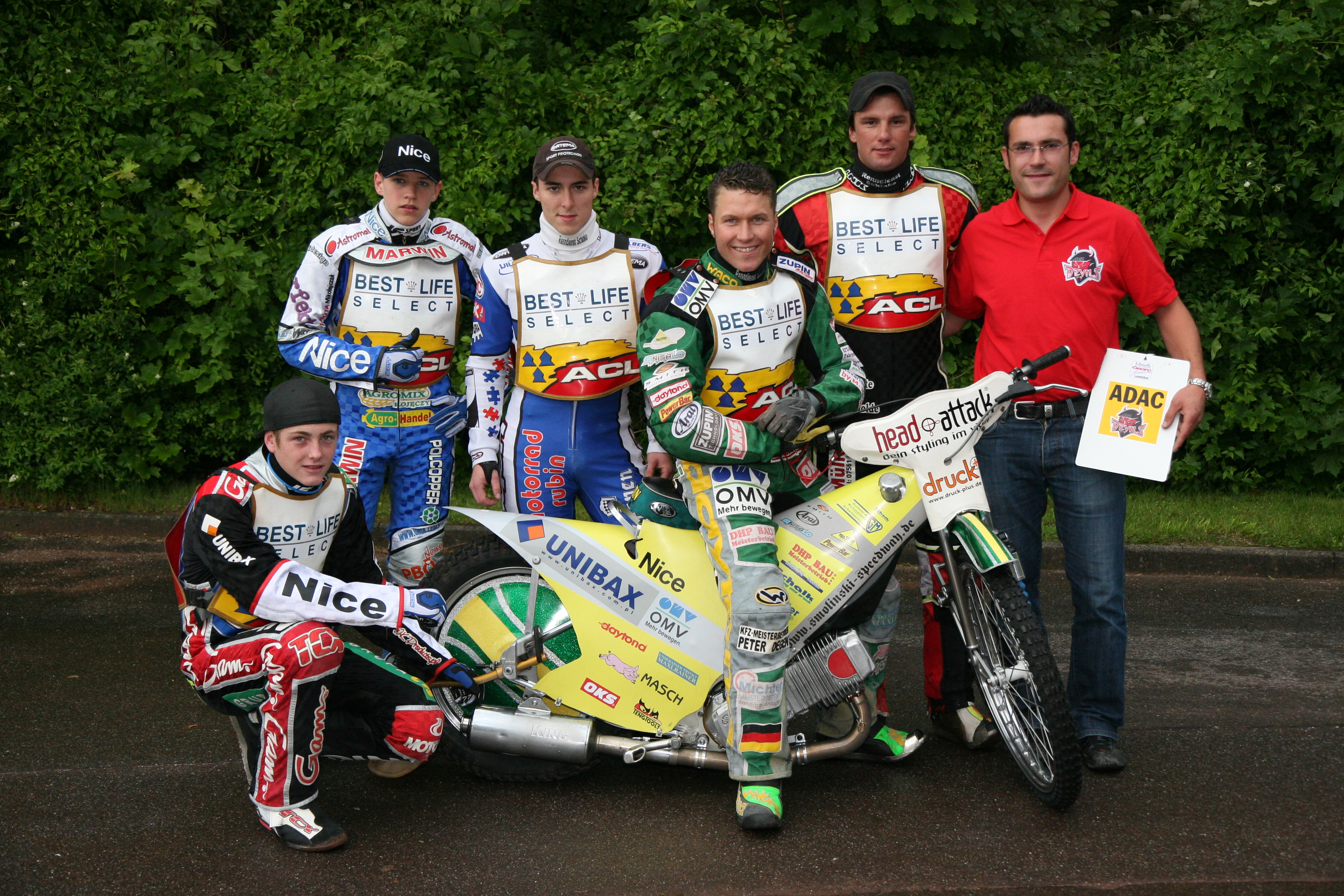
- The 2009 champions - Landshut Devils
- Sport: Motorcycle speedway

The German Speedway Team Championships are an annual motorcycle speedway events held each year organised by the Deutscher Motor Sport Bund.

The Championships are referred to as the Bundesliga but from 2021 until 2022, a shortened format was arranged due to the problems caused by the COVID-19 pandemic.

== Past winners ==
=== East Germany (1965-1990) ===
| Year | Winners | Runner-up | 3rd place |
| 1965 | MC Meissen | MC Güstrow | MC Neptun Rostock |
| 1966 | MC Güstrow | MC Meissen | MC Dynamo Rostock |
| 1967 | MC Güstrow | MC Dynamo Rostock | MC Meissen |
| 1968 | MC Güstrow | MC Dynamo Rostock | MC Meissen |
| 1969 | MC Dynamo Rostock | MC Güstrow | MC Meissen |
| 1970 | MC Dynamo Rostock | MC Güstrow | MC Meissen |
| 1971 | MC Dynamo Rostock | MC Güstrow | MC Meissen |
| 1972 | MC Güstrow | MC Meissen | MC Dynamo Nordstern Stralsund |
| 1973 | MC Güstrow | MC Meissen | MC Dynamo Nordstern Stralsund |
| 1974 | MC Güstrow | MC Meissen | MC Dynamo Nordstern Stralsund |
| 1975 | MC Güstrow | MC Meissen | MC Dynamo Nordstern Stralsund |
| 1976 | MC Meissen | MC Güstrow | MC Neptun Rostock/MC Neubrandenburg |
| 1977 | MC Güstrow | MC Meissen | MC Neubrandenburg/MC Jugend Lübbenau |
| 1978 | MC Güstrow | MC Meissen | MC Dynamo Nordstern Stralsund/MC Neptun Rostock |
| 1979 | MC Güstrow | MC Meissen | MC Neubrandenburg |
| 1980 | MC Güstrow | MC Jugend Lübbenau | MC Dynamo Nordstern Stralsund |
| 1981 | MC Güstrow | MC Meissen | MC Dynamo Nordstern Stralsund |
| 1982 | MC Güstrow | MC Meissen | MC Jugend Lübbenau |
| 1983 | MC Güstrow | MC Meissen | MC Dynamo Nordstern Stralsund |
| 1984 | MC Güstrow | MC Meissen | MC Neubrandenburg |
| 1985 | MC Güstrow | MC Meissen | MC Neubrandenburg |
| 1986 | MC Güstrow | MC Neubrandenburg | MC Meissen |
| 1987 | MC Güstrow | MC Neubrandenburg | MC Bergring Teterow |
| 1988 | MC Neubrandenburg | MC Güstrow | MC Ludwigslust |
| 1989 | MC Güstrow | MC Neubrandenburg | MC Bergring Teterow |
| 1990 | MC Güstrow | MC Bergring Teterow | MC Neubrandenburg |

=== West Germany (1973-1990) ===
| Year | Winners | Runner-up | 3rd place |
| 1973 | Team 70 Neumünster | MSC Olching | MSC Cloppenburg |
| 1974 | MSC Ipf Bopfingen | MSC Ruhpolding | Team 70 Neumünster |
| 1975 | MC Krumbach | MSC Ipf Bopfingen | Team 70 Brokstedt |
| 1976 | MC Krumbach | Team 70 Brokstedt | AC Landshut |
| 1977 | AC Landshut | Team 70 Brokstedt | MSC Ipf Bopfingen |
| 1978 | AC Landshut | MSC Ipf Bopfingen | MC Krumbach |
| 1979 | AC Landshut | MSC Olching | MSC Ipf Bopfingen |
| 1980 | Team 70 Brokstedt | AC Landshut | MSC Olching |
| 1981 | Team 70 Brokstedt | AC Landshut | MSC Olching |
| 1982 | AC Landshut | MSC Ruhpolding | MSC Pocking |
| 1983 | MC Krumbach | AC Landshut | MSC Ipf Bopfingen |
| 1984 | AC Landshut | MC Krumbach | MSC Diedenbergen |
| 1985 | MSC Diedenbergen | MSC Neustadt | MC Krumbach |
| 1986 | AC Landshut | MSC Neustadt | MSC Brokstedt |
| 1987 | MSC Diedenbergen | MSC Brokstedt | MSC Pocking |
| 1988 | MSC Diedenbergen | AC Landshut | MSC Brokstedt |
| 1989 | AC Landshut | MSC Diedenbergen | MSC Brokstedt |
| 1990 | MSC Diedenbergen | AC Landshut | MSC Brokstedt |

=== Germany ===
| Year | Winners | Runner-up | 3rd place |
| 1991 | AC Landshut | MSC Diedenbergen | MSC Brokstedt |
| 1992 | MSC Olching | AC Landshut | MSC Brokstedt |
| 1993 | AC Landshut | MSC Brokstedt | MSC Olching |
| 1994 | MSC Diedenbergen | SC Neuenknick | MSC Brokstedt |
| 1995 | MSC Diedenbergen | SC Neuenknick | MSC Brokstedt |
| 1996 | MSC Diedenbergen | SC Neuenknick | MSC Brokstedt |
| 1997 | MSC Brokstedt | MSC Diedenbergen | MC Güstrow |
| 1998 | MSC Diedenbergen | MSC Brokstedt | AC Landshut |
| 1999 | AC Landshut | MSC Diedenbergen | MSC Brokstedt |
| 2000 | AC Landshut | MSC Brokstedt | MSC Diedenbergen |
| 2001 | MSC Diedenbergen | AC Landshut | MSC Brokstedt |
| 2002 | MC Güstrow | MSC Olching | MSC Brokstedt |
| 2003 | MC Güstrow | MSC Brokstedt | MSC Diedenbergen |
| 2004 | RG Parchim/Wolfslake | MC Güstrow | MSC Olching |
| 2005 | MSC Diedenbergen | MC Bergring Teterow | MSC Brokstedt |
| 2006 | MSC Olching | MSC Diedenbergen | SC Neuenknick |
| 2007 | MSC Olching | MC Güstrow | AC Landshut |
| 2008 | MSC Olching | MSC Diedenbergen | ST Berlin Wolfslake |
| 2009 | AC Landshut | ST Berlin Wolfslake | MSC Diedenbergen |
| 2010 | AC Landshut | MC Güstrow | ST Berlin Wolfslake |
| 2011 | AC Landshut | ST Berlin Wolfslake | MSC Brokstedt |
| 2012 | AC Landshut | MC Nordstern Stralsund | MSC Brokstedt |
| 2013 | AC Landshut | ST Berlin Wolfslake | MC Nordstern Stralsund |
| 2014 | MSC Brokstedt | AC Landshut | ST Berlin Wolfslake |
| 2015 | MC Nordstern Stralsund | AC Landshut | MSC Brokstedt |
| 2016 | AC Landshut | MSC Brokstedt | MC Nordstern Stralsund |
| 2017 | AC Landshut | MSC Brokstedt | MSC Wölfe Wittstock |
| 2018 | AC Landshut | MSC Wölfe Wittstock | MSC Brokstedt |
| 2019 | MSC Brokstedt | AC Landshut | MSC Wölfe Wittstock |
| 2020 | not held due to COVID-19 pandemic | | |
| 2021 | MSC Brokstedt | AC Landshut | MC Güstrow |
| 2022 | MC Nordstern Stralsund | MSC Olching | MSC Brokstedt |
| 2023 | MC Güstrow | MSC Olching | MC Nordstern Stralsund |

== See also ==
- Germany national speedway team
- Speedway Grand Prix of Germany
- German Individual Speedway Championship
