= MC Güstrow =

German motorcycle speedway team

Club information
- Track address: Güstrow Speedway Stadium
- Country: Germany
- Founded: 1963
- League: Speedway Bundesliga
- Website: www.mcguestrow.de/termine/

Club facts
- Nickname: Torros (The Bulls)
- Track size: 298m

Major team honours
Bundesliga champions (x3)	2002, 2003, 2023
East German Champions (x20)	1966–1968, 1972–1975, 1977–1987 1989–1990
Bundesliga Runners-up (x4)	1985, 1987, 1988, 1990
East German Runners-up (x6)	1965, 1969, 1970, 1971, 1976, 1988

MC Güstrow is a German motorcycle speedway team based in Güstrow, Germany.

The team are three-times champions of Germany, having won the Speedway Bundesliga in 2002, 2003 and 2023. They were also a record twenty-times champions of the former East Germany.
