= 2023 Polish speedway season =

Motorcycle racing competition

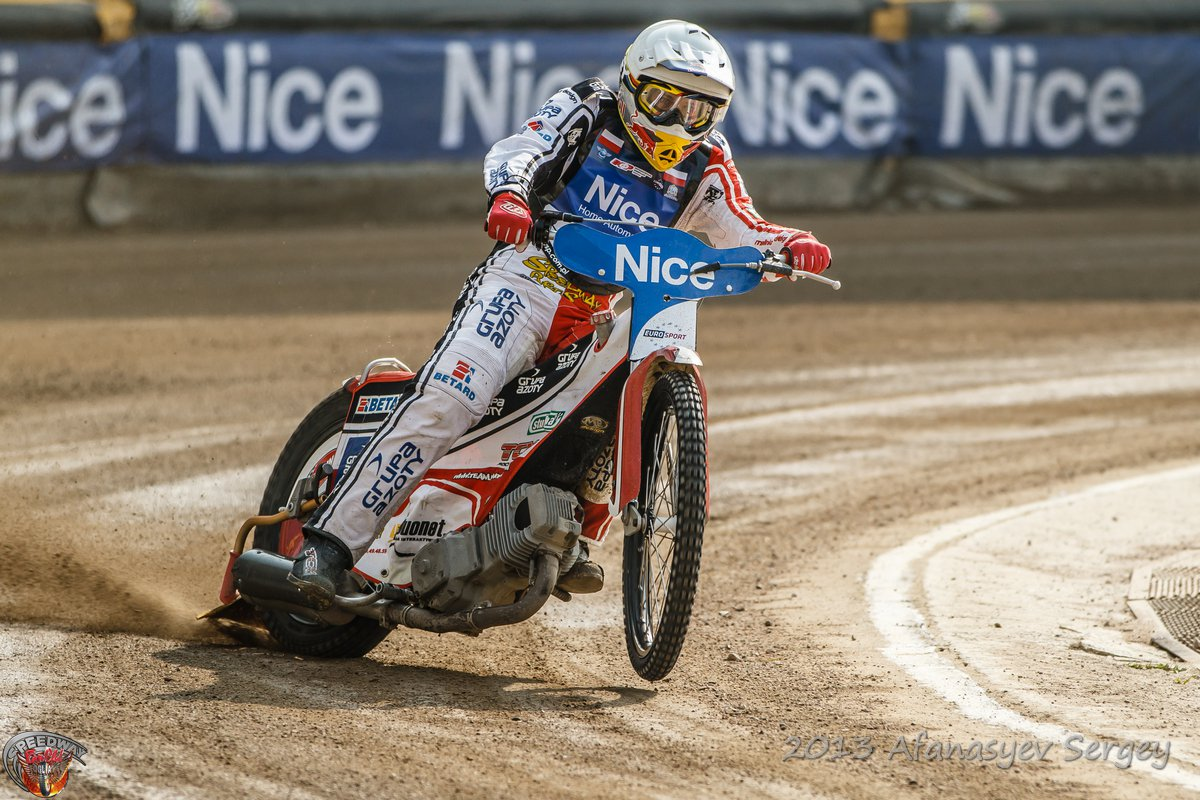
- Maciej Janowski, winner of the Golden Helmet

The 2023 Polish Speedway season was the 2023 season of motorcycle speedway in Poland. The season ran from 8 April to 8 October.

== Individual ==
=== Polish Individual Speedway Championship ===
The 2023 Individual Speedway Polish Championship (Polish: Indywidualne Mistrzostwa Polski, IMP) was the 2023 version of Polish Individual Speedway Championship organised by the Polish Motor Union (PZM). The Championship was held over three legs and Bartosz Zmarzlik won his third consecutive Polish title.

Pos.	Rider	Club	Total
1	Bartosz Zmarzlik	Lublin	50
2	Maciej Janowski	Wrocław	35+3
3	Patryk Dudek	Toruń	35+2
4	Jarosław Hampel	Lublin	30
5	Janusz Kołodziej	Leszno	28
6	Oskar Fajfer	Gorzów Wlkp	25
	Szymon Woźniak	Gorzów Wlkp	25
8	Kacper Woryna	Częstochowa	23
9	Krzysztof Buczkowski	Zielona Góra	19
10	Przemysław Pawlicki	Zielona Góra	17
11	Dominik Kubera	Lublin	15
12	Wiktor Lampart	Toruń	14
	Piotr Pawlicki	Wrocław	14
	Wiktor Przyjemski	Bydgoszcz	14
15	Wiktor Jasiński	Gorzów	11
16	Mateusz Cierniak	Lublin	10
17	Jakub Miśkowiak	Częstochowa	6
	Marcin Nowak	Rzeszów	6
19	Adrian Gała	Poznań	2
20	Mateusz Świdnicki	Krosno	1
	Bartłomiej Kowalski	Wrocław	1
22	Hubert Łęgowik	Gniezno	0

=== Golden Helmet & Grand Prix Qualifier ===
The 2023 Golden Golden Helmet (Polish: Turniej o Złoty Kask, ZK) organised by the Polish Motor Union (PZM) was the 2023 event for the league's leading riders. The final was held at the Marian Spychała Speedway Stadium in Opole, during April. It also acted as the 2023 Polish Grand Prix Qualifier, which was the 2023 edition of the Polish qualifier for the 2024 Speedway Grand Prix. Five riders qualified for the 2024 Speedway Grand Prix Qualification stage but Janowski and Zmarzlik opted out of qualifying.

Pos.	Rider	Club	Pts	Total
1	Maciej Janowski	Wrocław	3, 3, 3, 3, 2	14
2	Bartosz Zmarzlik	Lublin	2, 3, 3, 2, 3	13
3	Piotr Pawlicki	Wrocław	3, 2, 1, 3, 3	12
4	Dominik Kubera	Lublin	2, 2, 2, 2, 3	11
5	Bartosz Smektała	Leszno	3, 3, 0, 1, 2	9
6	Przemysław Pawlicki (res)	Zielona Góra	1, 3, 2, 1, 2	9
7	Szymon Woźniak	Gorzów	1, 1, 3, 0, 3	8
8	Janusz Kołodziej	Leszno	3, 1, 1, 1, 1	7
9	Kacper Woryna	Częstochowa	2, 2, 0, 2, 1	7
10	Mateusz Cierniak	Lublin	2, X, 1, 3, 0	6
11	Jarosław Hampel	Lublin	0, 0, 2, 3, 1	6
12	Wiktor Przyjemski	Bydgoszcz	0, 2, 2, 2, 0	6
13	Patryk Dudek	Toruń	0, 1, 3, 0, 1	5
14	Paweł Przedpełski	Toruń	1, 1, 0, 1, 2	5
15	Jakub Miśkowiak	Częstochowa	0, 0, 1, 0, 0	1
16	Krzysztof Kasprzak	Krosno	1, 0, 0, 0, 0	1

=== Criterium of Aces ===
The Mieczysław Połukard Criterium of Aces was won by Artem Laguta.

=== Polish U21 Championship ===
- Date: 30 August 2023
- winner - Bartłomiej Kowalski

=== Silver Helmet ===
- Arena Częstochowa, 1 May 2023

Referee : Artur Kuśmierz

Pos.	Rider	Club	Pts	Total
1	Bartłomiej Kowalski	Wrocław	(3,2,3,3,2)	13
2	Damian Ratajczak	Leszno	(2,3,3,1,2)	11+3
3	Kacper Pludra	Grudziądz	(0,3,2,3,3)	11+2
4	Oskar Paluch	Gorzów Wlkp.	(3,1,3,2,w)	9
5	Krzysztof Sadurski	Krosno	(1,0,1,3,3)	8
6	Kacper Grzelak	Ostrów Wlkp.	(3,1,0,1,3)	8
7	Jakub Krawczyk	Ostrów Wlkp.	(0,2,1,2,3	8
8	Mateusz Bartkowiak	Gorzów Wlkp.	(2,2,3,0,1)	8
9	Wiktor Przyjemski	Bydgoszcz	(0,1,2,3,2)	8
10	Denis Zieliński	Krosno	(2,3,2,0,0)	7
11	Krzysztof Lewandowski	Toruń	(1,2,2,1,1)	7
12	Mateusz Dul	Łódź	(1,3,1,0,1)	6
13	Kajetan Kupiec	Częstochowa	(1,0,1,2,2)	6
14	Michał Curzytek	Zielona Góra	(3,0,0,2,0)	5
15	Franciszek Karczewski	Częstochowa	(2,1,0,1,1)	5
16	Karol Żupiński	Poznań	(0,0,0,0,d)}	0
17	Jakub Poczta	Ostrów Wlkp.	(t)	0

Heat by Heat

Extended content
1. [59,10] Paluch, Jabłoński, Trześniewski, Lewandowski
2. [59,59] Karczewski, Rafalski, Krawczyk, Hurysz
3. [59,97] Mencel, Bańdur, Affelt, Kupiec (u)
4. [59,41] Przyjemski, Ratajczak, Łobodziński, Poczta (d)
5. [60,85] Bańdur, Łobodziński, Lewandowski, Karczewski
6. [59,62] Paluch, Przyjemski, Kupiec, Hurysz
7. [59,72] Ratajczak, Krawczyk, Trześniewski, Affelt
8. [60,28] Mencel, Rafalski, Jabłoński, Poczta
9. [61,53] Lewandowski, Poczta, Hurysz, Affelt
10. [60,22] Mencel, Paluch, Ratajczak, Karczewski
11. [61,31] Przyjemski, Bańdur, Rafalski, Trześniewski
12. [61,56] Krawczyk, Łobodziński, Jabłoński, Kupiec
13. [60,88] Przyjemski, Krawczyk, Lewandowski, Mencel (w)
14. [61,11] Paluch, Rafalski, Łobodziński, Affelt
15. [61,19] Karczewski, Poczta, Kupiec, Trześniewski
16. [60,54] Ratajczak, Bańdur, Jabłoński, Hurysz
17. [62,09] Ratajczak, Lewandowski, Rafalski, Kupiec (w)
18. [61,31] Krawczyk, Paluch, Bańdur, Poczta (d)
19. [61,60] Mencel, Łobodziński, Trześniewski, Hurysz
20. [61,89] Przyjemski, Jabłoński, Karczewski, Affelt

=== Bronze Helmet ===
- winner - Krzysztof Lewandowski

== Pairs ==
=== Polish Pairs Speedway Championship ===
The 2023 Polish Pairs Speedway Championship (Polish: Mistrzostwa Polski par klubowych na żużlu) was the 2023 edition of the Polish Pairs Speedway Championship. The final was held on 31 March at Rzeszów .

Pos	Team	Pts	Riders
1	Lublin	22	Dominik Kubera 11, Bartosz Zmarzlik 10+3, Freddie Lindgren 1
2	Leszno	22	Chris Holder 8, Janusz Kołodziej 8, Bartosz Smektała 6
3	Częstochowa	18	Leon Madsen 15, Kacper Woryna 2, Jakub Miśkowiak 1
4	Toruń	18	Robert Lambert 14, Patryk Dudek 2, Paweł Przedpełski 2
5	Rzeszów	17	Jacob Thorssell 11, Marcin Nowak 6
6	Krosno	15	Jason Doyle 12, Krzysztof Kasprzak 3, Mateusz Świdnicki 0
7	Gorzów	14	Anders Thomsen 6, Szymon Woźniak 5, Oskar Fajfer 3

== Team ==
=== Team Speedway Polish Championship ===
The 2023 Team Speedway Polish Championship (Polish: Drużynowe mistrzostwa Polski na żużlu) was the 2023 edition of the Team Polish Championship to determine the gold medal winner (champion of Poland). Teams finishing second and third were awarded silver and bronze medals respectively.

=== Ekstraliga ===
Pos	Team	P	W	D	L	BP	Pts
1	Wrocław	14	12	0	2	6	30
2	Lublin	14	11	0	3	6	28
3	Gorzów	14	7	2	5	4	20
4	Częstochowa	14	6	3	5	3	18
5	Toruń	14	5	1	8	4	15
6	Leszno	14	5	0	9	1	11
7	Grudziądz	14	3	2	9	2	10
8	Krosno	14	3	0	11	1	7

Quarter-finals

Team 1	Team 2	Score
Leszno	Wrocław	42–48, 37–53
Częstochowa	Gorzów	49–41, 50–40
Toruń	Lublin	42–47, 41–49

Semi-finals

Team 1	Team 2	Score
Toruń	Wrocław	45–45, 39–51
Częstochowa	Lublin	36–54, 32–58

Third place

Team 1	Team 2	Score
Toruń	Częstochowa	50–40, 44–46

Final

Team 1	Team 2	Score
Lublin	Wrocław	51–39, 55–35

Leading averages

	Rider	Team	Average
1	Bartosz Zmarzlik	Lublin	10.10
2	Emil Sayfutdinov	Toruń	9.77
3	Janusz Kołodziej	Leszno	9.33
4	Martin Vaculík	Gorzów	9.10
5	Leon Madsen	Częstochowa	9.00

=== 1. Liga ===
Pos	Team	P	W	D	L	BP	Pts
1	Zielona Góra	14	14	0	0	7	35
2	Bydgoszcz	14	8	0	6	5	21
3	Ostrów	14	8	0	6	5	21
4	Rybnik	14	7	0	7	4	18
5	Landshut (Germany)	14	6	0	8	3	15
6	Gdańsk	14	5	0	9	2	12
7	Łódź	14	4	0	10	2	10
8	Poznań	14	4	0	10	0	8

Quarter-finals

Team 1	Team 2	Score
Gdańsk	Zielona Góra	30–60, 31–59
Rybnik	Ostrów	51–39, 40–50
Landshut	Bydgoszcz	44–45, 37–53

Semi-finals

Team 1	Team 2	Score
Ostrów	Zielona Góra	42–47, 35–55
Rybnik	Bydgoszcz	49–41, 44–46

Final

Team 1	Team 2	Score
Rybnik	Zielona Góra	40–50, 32–58

Leading averages

	Rider	Team	Average
1	Wiktor Przyjemski	Bydgoszcz	10.00
2	Przemysław Pawlicki	Zielona Góra	9.65
3	Rasmus Jensen	Zielona Góra	9.33
4	Krzysztof Buczkowski	Zielona Góra	9.07
5	Aleksandr Loktaev	Poznań	8.79

=== 2. Liga ===
Pos	Team	P	W	D	L	BP	Pts
1	Rzeszów	12	7	2	3	5	21
2	Gniezno	12	7	1	4	5	20
3	Opole	12	6	4	2	3	19
4	Tarnów	12	5	1	6	3	14
5	Daugavpils (Latvia)	12	5	2	5	2	14
6	Piła	12	3	3	6	1	10
7	Rawicz	12	2	1	9	0	5

Semi-finals

Team 1	Team 2	Score
Tarnów	Rzeszów	38–51, 34–56
Opole	Gniezno	44–46, 39–51

Final

Team 1	Team 2	Score
Gniezno	Rzeszów	38–52, 32–57

== Teams ==
Częstochowa

- Maksym Drabik
- Kacper Halkiewicz
- Franciszek Karczewski
- Anton Karlsson
- Kajetan Kupiec
- Leon Madsen
- Mikkel Michelsen
- Jakub Miśkowiak
- Kacper Woryna

Gorzów

- Mateusz Bartkowiak
- Oskar Fajfer
- Wiktor Jasiński
- Oskar Paluch
- Mathias Pollestad
- Anders Thomsen
- Martin Vaculík
- Szymon Woźniak

Grudziądz

- Gleb Chugunov
- Max Fricke
- Frederik Jakobsen
- Kacper Łobodziński
- Nicki Pedersen
- Kacper Pludra
- Wiktor Rafalski
- Mateusz Szczepaniak
- Vadim Tarasenko

Krosno

- Szymon Bandur
- Jason Doyle
- Krzysztof Kasprzak
- Andzejs Lebedevs
- Václav Milík
- Krzysztof Sadurski
- Mateusz Świdnicki
- Piotr Świercz
- Denis Zieliński

Leszno

- Chris Holder
- Hubert Jabłoński
- Janusz Kołodziej
- Jaimon Lidsey
- Antoni Mencel
- Adrian Miedziński
- Nazar Parnicki
- Damian Ratajczak
- Bartosz Smektala
- Grzegorz Zengota

Lublin

- Bartosz Bańbor
- Mateusz Cierniak
- Kacper Grzelak
- Jaroslaw Hampel
- Jack Holder
- Dominik Kubera
- Freddie Lindgren
- Bartosz Zmarzlik

Toruń

- Mateusz Affelt
- Kacper Andrzejewski
- Patryk Dudek
- Wiktor Lampart
- Krzysztof Lewandowski
- Robert Lambert
- Paweł Przedpełski
- Oskar Rumiński
- Emil Sayfutdinov

Wrocław

- Kacper Andrzejewski
- Dan Bewley
- Maciej Janowski
- Bartłomiej Kowalski
- Artem Laguta
- Mateusz Panicz
- Piotr Pawlicki
- Tai Woffinden
