= 2024 Speedway Grand Prix of Poland =

Speedway Grand Prix event

2024 Speedway Grand Prix of Poland I, II, III & IV
- Venue: Stadion Narodowy; Edward Jancarz Stadium; Olympic Stadium; MotoArena Toruń
- Location: Warsaw; Gorzów; Wrocław; Toruń
- Start date: 11 May; 29 June; 31 August; 28 September
- Competitors: 16 (2 reserves)

The 2024 FIM Speedway Grand Prix of Poland was the second, sixth, eighth and eleventh rounds of the 2024 Speedway Grand Prix season (the World Championship).

The second round took place on 11 May 2024 at the Stadion Narodowy in Warsaw. The sixth round took place at the Edward Jancarz Stadium in Gorzów Wielkopolski on 29 June. The eighth round was held on 31 August at the Olympic Stadium in Wrocław and the eleventh and final round was held on 28 September at the MotoArena Toruń in Toruń.

The rounds were the 61st to 64th Speedway Grand Prix of Poland respectively.

A new sprint race was introduced during the qualifying session (at selected Grand Prix), with the fastest rider in each qualifying session progressing to a single race for extra points. The idea behind the sprint race was similar to that brought into the Formula One, whereby the qualifying sessions were given more importance. The Polish-Warsaw Grand Prix was the first time that the sprint had been held.

The Warsaw Grand Prix was won by Jason Doyle, which was his first Grand Prix win since Melbourne in 2017. The Gorzów Grand Prix was won by Freddie Lindgren (his 7th career Grand Prix win). During the Gorzów round Tai Woffinden crashed heavily and was taken to hospital, potentially ending his season.

The Wrocław Grand Prix was won by Martin Vaculík (his 9th career Grand Prix win).

The Toruń Grand Prix was the final event of the 2024 season was won by Bartosz Zmarzlik (his 26th career Grand Prix win). Zmarzlik had already sealed the world title during round ten of the Championship.

== Results ==
=== Event 1 - Orlen Warsaw Grand Prix (11 May) ===
==== Sprint result ====
Pos	Rider	GP Points
1	(United Kingdom) Dan Bewley	4
2	(Denmark) Leon Madsen	3
3	(United Kingdom) Tai Woffinden	2
4	(United Kingdom) Robert Lambert	1

==== Main round ====
Placing	Rider	1	2	3	4	5	6	7	8	9	10	11	12	13	14	15	16	17	18	19	20	Pts	SF1	SF2	Final	GP Pts
1	(Australia) (3) Jason Doyle	3						3				2				3				3		14	3		3	20
2	(Poland) (12) Bartosz Zmarzlik			3					1		3			1						2		10		3	2	18
3	(United Kingdom) (8) Robert Lambert		3						2			1			2			1				9	2		1	16
4	(Slovakia) (4) Martin Vaculík	1							3				2				3				3	12		2	0	14
5	(Australia) (11) Jack Holder			1				1		3					3						2	10	1			12
6	(United Kingdom) (13) Dan Bewley				2	2							3		0					1		8		1		11
7	(Poland) (16) Szymon Woźniak				3				0	2						2			2			9		0		10
8	(Germany) (2) Kai Huckenbeck	2					1				2				1				3			9	0			9
9	(Denmark) (7) Mikkel Michelsen		2					2					1	3					0			8				8
10	(Sweden) (14) Freddie Lindgren				1		2					3		0							1	7				7
11	(United Kingdom) (9) Tai Woffinden			2		3						0					0		1			6				6
12	(Latvia) (1) Andžejs Ļebedevs	0				1				1				2				2				6				5
13	(Czech Republic) (6) Jan Kvěch		1				3			0							1			0		5				4
14	(Poland) (10) Mateusz Cierniak			0			0						0			0		3				3				3
15	(Poland) (15) Dominik Kubera				0			0			0						2	1				3				2
16	(Denmark) (5) Leon Madsen		0			m					1					1					0	2				1
R1	(Poland) (R1) Bartłomiej Kowalski					1																1	R1			
R2	(Poland) (R2) Damian Ratajczak																					0	R2			

m - exclusion for exceeding two minute time allowance • t - exclusion for touching the tapes • x - other exclusion • e - retired or mechanical failure • f - fell • ns - non-starter • nc - non-classify

gate A - inside	gate B	gate C	gate D - outside

=== Event 2 - Gorzów Grand Prix (29 June) ===
==== Result ====
Placing	Rider	1	2	3	4	5	6	7	8	9	10	11	12	13	14	15	16	17	18	19	20	Pts	SF1	SF2	Final	GP Pts
1	(Sweden) (3) Freddie Lindgren	2						2				3				3				2		12		2	3	20
2	(Poland) (12) Bartosz Zmarzlik			3					3		3			2						1		12	2		2	18
3	(Denmark) (11) Mikkel Michelsen			1				3		3					1						3	11		3	1	16
4	(Denmark) (6) Leon Madsen		2				2			1							2			3		10	3		e	14
5	(Slovakia) (10) Martin Vaculík			2			3						3			0		1				9		1		12
6	(Germany) (4) Kai Huckenbeck	3							1				0				3				2	9	1			11
7	(Poland) (1) Szymon Woźniak	1				2				2				1				3				9		0		10
8	(Australia) (8) Jack Holder		0						2			2			3			2				9	f			9
9	(Czech Republic) (7) Jan Kvěch		3					f					1	0					3			7				8
10	(United Kingdom) (5) Dan Bewley		1			3					0					2					1	7				7
11	(Poland) (14) Oskar Fajfer				1		1					0		3							0	5				6
12	(Australia) (2) Max Fricke	0					0				2				2				1			5				5
13	(Poland) (15) Dominik Kubera				2			1			1						0	0				4				4
14	(United Kingdom) (9) Robert Lambert			e		0						1					1		2			4				3
15	(United Kingdom) (16) Tai Woffinden				3				f	ns						ns			ns			3				2
16	(Poland) (13) Maciej Janowski				0	1							2		t					0		3				1
R1	(Poland) (R1) Jakub Miśkowiak									0						1						1	R1			
R2	(Poland) (R2) Oskar Paluch														0				0			0	R2			

m - exclusion for exceeding two minute time allowance • t - exclusion for touching the tapes • x - other exclusion • e - retired or mechanical failure • f - fell • ns - non-starter • nc - non-classify

gate A - inside	gate B	gate C	gate D - outside

=== Event 3 - Wrocław Grand Prix (31 August) ===
==== Result ====
Placing	Rider	1	2	3	4	5	6	7	8	9	10	11	12	13	14	15	16	17	18	19	20	Pts	SF1	SF2	Final	GP Pts
1	(Slovakia) (4) Martin Vaculík	3							3				3				0				2	11	3		3	20
2	(Sweden) (10) Freddie Lindgren			3			2						1			2		2				10		3	2	18
3	(United Kingdom) (5) Robert Lambert		2			2					2					1					3	10	2		1	16
4	(Denmark) (14) Mikkel Michelsen				1		3					3		1							1	9		2	e	14
5	(Poland) (15) Patryk Dudek				3			3			0						1	3				10		1		12
6	(United Kingdom) (12) Dan Bewley			1					0		3			3						2		9	1			11
7	(Poland) (16) Bartosz Zmarzlik				0				2	3						3			3			11		e		10
8	(Poland) (9) Maciej Janowski			2		3						0					3		2			10	e			9
9	(Latvia) (6) Andžejs Ļebedevs		0				0			2							2			3		7				8
10	(Denmark) (2) Leon Madsen	2					1				1				3				x			7				7
11	(Australia) (8) Jack Holder		3						1			1			0			1				6				6
12	(Poland) (7) Dominik Kubera		1					0					2	2					1			6				5
13	(Australia) (13) Max Fricke				2	1							f		2					1		6				4
14	(Germany) (11) Kai Huckenbeck			0				2		1					1						0	4				3
15	(Czech Republic) (3) Jan Kvěch	0						1				2				0				0		3				2
16	(Poland) (1) Szymon Woźniak	1				0				0				0				0				1				1
R1	(Poland) (R1) Marcel Kowalik																					0	R1			
R2	(Poland) (R2) Nikodem Mikolajczyk																					0	R2			

m - exclusion for exceeding two minute time allowance • t - exclusion for touching the tapes • x - other exclusion • e - retired or mechanical failure • f - fell • ns - non-starter • nc - non-classify

gate A - inside	gate B	gate C	gate D - outside

=== Event 4 - Toruń Grand Prix (28 September) ===
==== Result ====
Placing	Rider	1	2	3	4	5	6	7	8	9	10	11	12	13	14	15	16	17	18	19	20	Pts	SF1	SF2	Final	GP Pts
1	(Poland) (13) Bartosz Zmarzlik				1	1							1		3					2		8		2	3	20
2	(Denmark) (14) Leon Madsen				3		2					1		x							3	9	2		2	18
3	(United Kingdom) (12) Dan Bewley			3					3		0			x						3		9		3	1	16
4	(Sweden) (9) Freddie Lindgren			1		3						3					1		1			9	3		0	14
5	(Poland) (1) Patryk Dudek	3				2				3				2				3				13		1		12
6	(Czech Republic) (10) Jan Kvěch			2			3						3			0		2				10	1			11
7	(Poland) (7) Dominik Kubera		3					3					2	3					3			14	0			10
8	(Australia) (15) Jack Holder				2			2			3						3	1				11		0		9
9	(Slovakia) (5) Martin Vaculík		2			0					2					2					2	8				8
10	(United Kingdom) (8) Robert Lambert		1						2			2			2			0				7				7
11	(Poland) (2) Maciej Janowski	2					1				1				1				2			7				6
12	(Australia) (16) Max Fricke				0				1	2						1			0			4				5
13	(Latvia) (4) Andžejs Ļebedevs	1							0				0				2				1	4				4
14	(Germany) (3) Kai Huckenbeck	0						0				0				3				0		3				3
15	(Poland) (11) Szymon Woźniak			0				1		1					0						0	2				2
16	(Sweden) (6) Kim Nilsson		0				0			0							0			1		1				1
R1	(Poland) (R1) Oskar Paluch																					0	R1			
R2	(Poland) (R2) Krzysztof Lewandowski																					0	R2			

m - exclusion for exceeding two minute time allowance • t - exclusion for touching the tapes • x - other exclusion • e - retired or mechanical failure • f - fell • ns - non-starter • nc - non-classify

gate A - inside	gate B	gate C	gate D - outside
