= 2024 Speedway Grand Prix of Czech Republic =

Speedway Grand Prix event

- Venue: Markéta Stadium
- Location: Prague (Czech Republic)
- Start date: 1 June 2024
- Competitors: 16 (2 reserves)

The 2024 Orlen FIM Speedway Grand Prix of Czech Republic was the fourth round of the 2024 Speedway Grand Prix season. It took place on 1 June at the Markéta Stadium in Prague, Czech Republic. It was the 30th Speedway Grand Prix of Czech Republic.

The event was won by Martin Vaculík for the third consecutive year. It was Vaculík's 8th career Grand Prix win.

== Grand Prix result ==
Placing	Rider	1	2	3	4	5	6	7	8	9	10	11	12	13	14	15	16	17	18	19	20	Pts	SF1	SF2	Final	GP Pts
1	(Slovakia) (13) Martin Vaculík				2	3							3		3					3		14	3		3	20
2	(Sweden) (9) Freddie Lindgren			0		2						2					3		3			10		2	2	18
3	(Poland) (14) Bartosz Zmarzlik				3		3					3		1							3	13		3	1	16
4	(Poland) (10) Dominik Kubera			1			2						0			3		3				9	2		0	14
5	(United Kingdom) (11) Robert Lambert			2				3		2					2						2	11	1			12
6	(Denmark) (6) Mikkel Michelsen		2				1			3							2			0		8		1		11
7	(Australia) (12) Max Fricke			3					2		3			3						2		13		0		10
8	(Latvia) (8) Andžejs Ļebedevs		3						3			1			0			1				8	t			9
9	(Poland) (2) Szymon Woźniak	2					0				2				1				2			7				8
10	(Denmark) (1) Leon Madsen	3				1				0				0				2				6				7
11	(Australia) (7) Jack Holder		0					1					2	2					1			6				6
12	(United Kingdom) (3) Dan Bewley	1						2				0				1				1		5				5
13	(Czech Republic) (5) Václav Milík Jr.		1			0					1					2					0	4				4
14	(Czech Republic) (4) Jan Kvěch	0							1				1				0				1	3				3
15	(Germany) (16) Kai Huckenbeck				1				0	1						0			0			2				2
16	(United Kingdom) (15) Tai Woffinden				0			0			0						1	0				1				1
R1	(Czech Republic) (R1) Adam Bednář																					0	R1			
R2	(Czech Republic) (R2) Daniel Klíma																					0	R2			

m - exclusion for exceeding two minute time allowance • t - exclusion for touching the tapes • x - other exclusion • e - retired or mechanical failure • f - fell • ns - non-starter • nc - non-classify

gate A - inside	gate B	gate C	gate D - outside
