= 2024 Speedway Grand Prix of Sweden =

Speedway Grand Prix event

- Venue: Skrotfrag Arena
- Location: Målilla (Sweden)
- Start date: 15 June 2024
- Competitors: 16 (2 reserves)

The 2024 FIM Speedway Grand Prix of Sweden was the fifth round of the 2024 Speedway Grand Prix season (the World Championship of speedway). It took place on 15 June 2024 at the Skrotfrag Arena in Målilla, Sweden. It was the 29th Speedway Grand Prix of Sweden.

The event was won by Bartosz Zmarzlik (his 24th career Grand Prix win). By winning the 2024 Grand Prix of Sweden, Zmarzlik broke Jason Crump's all-time record of 23 Grand Prix wins, although ten of them were won on home soil, whereas Crump's were all outside of Australia.

The event was subject to a two-hour delay following heavy rain. As a consequence riders starting on the outside gate (yellow helmet) only won two heats.

== Grand Prix result ==
Placing	Rider	1	2	3	4	5	6	7	8	9	10	11	12	13	14	15	16	17	18	19	20	Pts	SF1	SF2	Final	GP Pts
1	(Poland) (11) Bartosz Zmarzlik			1				3		3					2						2	11		3	3	20
2	(Australia) (14) Max Fricke				3		3					2		2							1	11	3		2	18
3	(United Kingdom) (5) Robert Lambert		3			3					1					1					3	11		2	1	16
4	(Australia) (12) Jack Holder			0					3		3			3						3		12	2		0	14
5	(Denmark) (9) Mikkel Michelsen			3		0						0					3		3			9	1			12
6	(Poland) (6) Dominik Kubera		2				1			2							2			2		9		1		11
7	(Latvia) (10) Andžejs Ļebedevs			2			2						2			2		3				11		0		10
8	(United Kingdom) (13) Dan Bewley				0	2							3		3					1		9	0			9
9	(Sweden) (8) Freddie Lindgren		1						2			3			0			2				8				8
10	(Poland) (3) Szymon Woźniak	3						0				1				3				0		7				7
11	(Slovakia) (15) Martin Vaculík				2			1			2						1	f				6				6
12	(Denmark) (1) Leon Madsen	2				1				0				1				1				5				5
13	(United Kingdom) (2) Tai Woffinden	1					0				0				1				2			4				4
14	(Germany) (7) Kai Huckenbeck		0					2					0	0					1			3				3
15	(Czech Republic) (4) Jan Kvěch	0							1				1				0				0	2				2
16	(Sweden) (16) Kim Nilsson				1				0	1						0			0			2				1
R1	(Sweden) (R1) Filip Hjelmland																					0	R1			
R2	(Sweden) (R2) Philip Hellström Bängs																					0	R2			

m - exclusion for exceeding two minute time allowance • t - exclusion for touching the tapes • x - other exclusion • e - retired or mechanical failure • f - fell • ns - non-starter • nc - non-classify

gate A - inside	gate B	gate C	gate D - outside
