= 2024 Speedway Grand Prix of Croatia =

Speedway Grand Prix event

- Venue: Stadium Milenium
- Location: Donji Kraljevec (Goričan)
- Start date: 27 April 2024
- Competitors: 16 (2 reserves)

The 2024 Boll FIM Speedway Grand Prix of Croatia was the first race of the 2024 Speedway Grand Prix season. It took place on 27 April at the Stadium Milenium in Donji Kraljevec, Croatia. It was the sixth Speedway Grand Prix of Croatia.

The event was won by Australia Jack Holder, who won his maiden Grand Prix.

Five riders, Andžejs Ļebedevs, Kai Huckenbeck, Dominik Kubera, Szymon Woźniak and Jan Kvěch all made their first appearance as a permanent rider, having previously only ridden as wild cards or reserves.

== Grand Prix result ==
Placing	Rider	1	2	3	4	5	6	7	8	9	10	11	12	13	14	15	16	17	18	19	20	Pts	SF1	SF2	Final	GP Pts
1	(Australia) (16) Jack Holder				3				2	3						3			1			12	3		3	20
2	(Australia) (3) Jason Doyle	2						0				2				2				2		8	2		2	18
3	(Sweden) (10) Freddie Lindgren			2			2						2			1		1				8		2	1	16
4	(Poland) (5) Bartosz Zmarzlik		3			2					3					0					3	11		3	0	14
5	(United Kingdom) (2) Robert Lambert	3					3				2				3				0			11		1		12
6	(Germany) (9) Kai Huckenbeck			3		1						1					3		2			10	1			11
7	(Denmark) (8) Leon Madsen		0						3			3			1			2				9		0		10
8	(Poland) (12) Dominik Kubera			1					2		0			3						3		9	0			9
9	(Denmark) (1) Mikkel Michelsen	0				3				1				0				3				7				8
10	(Slovakia) (13) Martin Vaculík				0	0							3		2					1		6				7
11	(Poland) (6) Szymon Woźniak		2				0			2							2			0		6				6
12	(Czech Republic) (14) Jan Kvěch				2		1					0		2							1	6				5
13	(Latvia) (7) Andžejs Ļebedevs		1					0					0	1					3			5				4
14	(United Kingdom) (4) Dan Bewley	1							0				1				1				2	5				3
15	(Slovenia) (15) Matej Žagar				1			2			1						0	0				4				2
16	(United Kingdom) (11) Tai Woffinden			0				3		0					0						0	3				1
R1	(Germany) (R1) Marius Hillebrand																					0	R1			
R2	(Slovenia) (R2) Matic Ivačič																					0	R2			

m - exclusion for exceeding two minute time allowance • t - exclusion for touching the tapes • x - other exclusion • e - retired or mechanical failure • f - fell • ns - non-starter • nc - non-classify

gate A - inside	gate B	gate C	gate D - outside
