= 2027 Speedway Grand Prix Qualification =

World speedway event

Speedway Grand Prix Qualification
- Dates: 25 May to 25 July 2026

The 2027 Speedway Grand Prix Qualification was a series of motorcycle speedway meetings held during 2026 to determine the riders that qualified for the 2027 Speedway Grand Prix. The series consisted of three qualifying rounds at Abensberg, Žarnovica and Glasgow, and the Grand Prix Challenge at Terenzano.

Preliminary qualification events included the 'Nomination Race' in the Czech Republic and the Polish Golden Helmet

Robert Lambert won the Grand Prix challenge and thus qualified for the 2027 Grand Prix. He will be joined in the series by Rohan Tungate, Kacper Woryna and Kim Nilsson.

== National qualifying events ==
=== Australian Championship ===
Source:

=== FIM Oceania Championship ===
Source:

=== 2025 British Final ===
Source:

== FIM Qualifying rounds ==
=== Round One ===
- 25 May 2026
- (Germany) Abensberg

Pos.	Rider	Points	Details
1	(United States) Luke Becker	15	(3,3,3,3,3)
2	(Sweden) Kim Nilsson	13+2	(3,3,2,3,2)
3	(Australia) Rohan Tungate	13+2	(2,3,3,2,3)
4	(Australia) Keynan Rew	11+3	(2,2,3,3,1)
5	(Poland) Dominik Kubera	11+2	(2,2,3,1,3)
6	(Latvia) Francis Gusts	11+1	(3,3,1,2,2)
7	(Germany) Norick Blödorn	9	(1,2,2,3,1)
8	(France) Dimitri Bergé	8	(3,1,0,2,2)
9	(Germany) Kevin Wölbert	6	(2,0,1,0,3)
10	(Germany) Valentin Grobauer	5	(1,0,0,2,2)
11	(Slovenia) Matic Ivačič	5	(0,1,2,1,1)
12	(Czech Republic) Jan Kvěch	4	(1,2,1,W,-)
13	(Argentina) Cristian Zubillaga	4	(1,1,1,1,W)
14	(Italy) Niccolo Percotti	3	(0,1,2,0,0)
15	(France) Mathias Trésarrieu	2	(0,0,D,1,1)
16	(Germany) Patricia Erhart	0	(0,0,0,0,0)

=== Round Two ===
- 30 May 2026
- (Slovakia) Žarnovica

Pos.	Rider	Points	Details
1	(United Kingdom) Robert Lambert	14	(3,2,3,3,3)
2	(Australia) Jaimon Lidsey	13	(3,3,2,3,2)
3	(Latvia) Andžejs Ļebedevs	12+3	(3,1,3,3,2)
4	(Poland) Kacper Woryna	12+2	(2,3,3,1,3)
5	(Denmark) Michael Jepsen Jensen	10+3	(1,3,0,3,3)
6	(Czech Republic) Adam Bednář	10+2	(2,0,3,2,3)
7	(Slovakia) Martin Vaculík	8	(2,3,1,2,D)
8	(France) David Bellego	8	(1,2,2,2,1)
9	(Italy) Nicolás Covatti	7	(3,2,1,1,0)
10	(Czech Republic) Václav Milík	6	(1,2,1,2,0)
11	(Sweden) Oliver Berntzon	5	(2,D,2,0,1)
12	(Argentina) Facundo Albin	5	(0,1,2,W,2)
13	(Ukraine) Andriy Rozaliuk	4	(0,1,0,1,2)
14	(Hungary) Zoltán Lovas	3	(1,1,0,0,1)
15	(Slovenia) Anže Grmek	3	(0,0,1,1,1)
16	(Romania) Andrei Popa	0	(0,0,0,0,0)
17	(Slovakia) Anna Hajková (res)	0	(-,-,-,D,-)

=== Round Three ===
- 30 May 2026
- (United Kingdom) Glasgow

Pos.	Rider	Points	Details
1	(Germany) Kai Huckenbeck	15	(3,3,3,3,3)
2	(Australia) Jack Holder	12+3	(3,2,3,2,2)
3	(United Kingdom) Anders Rowe	12+2	(2,3,2,2,3)
4	(Denmark) Frederik Jakobsen	11+3	(2,3,3,1,2)
5	(United Kingdom) Chris Harris	11+2	(3,3,2,2,1)
6	(Poland) Maciej Janowski	11+1	(2,2,1,3,3)
7	(Sweden) Victor Palovaara	9	(1,1,3,3,1)
8	(United Kingdom) Adam Ellis	7	(3,0,2,0,2)
9	(Denmark) Jonas Knudsen	6	(1,2,2,D,1)
10	(United Kingdom) Tom Brennan (res)	4	(-,-,1,-,3)
11	(Poland) Piotr Pawlicki	4	(2,2,-,-,-)
12	(Germany) Mario Häusl	4	(0,1,0,1,2)
13	(Sweden) Casper Henriksson	4	(1,0,1,1,1)
14	(Norway) Lasse Fredriksen	3	(W,D,0,3,0)
15	(Czech Republic) Daniel Klíma	3	(1,1,1,0,0)
16	(Slovenia) Sven Cerjak	1	(0,0,0,2,0)
17	(Finland) Antti Vuolas	1	(0,1,W,D,0)
18	(United Kingdom) Sam Hagon (res)	1	(-,-,-,1,-)

=== Grand Prix Challenge ===
- 25 July 2026
- (Italy) Terenzano

Pos.	Rider	Points	Total
1	(United Kingdom) Robert Lambert	2,3,3,3,3	14+3
2	(Australia) Rohan Tungate	3,3,2,3,0	11+2
3	(Poland) Kacper Woryna	2,2,2,3,1	10+1
4	(Sweden) Kim Nilsson	1,3,1,2,3	10+0
5	(Latvia) Andžejs Ļebedevs	0,1,3,3,2	9
6	(Denmark) Michael Jepsen Jensen	3,2,0,2,2	9
7	(Denmark) Frederik Jakobsen	3,0,1,2,2	8
8	(United Kingdom) Chris Harris	3,0,0,1,3	7
9	(Poland) Maciej Janowski	1,1,3,2,R	7
10	(Italy) Paco Castagna	2,1,1,1,2	7
11	(Germany) Kai Huckenbeck	1,2,3,D,-	6
12	(Poland) Dominik Kubera	1,2,2,1,0	6
13	(Australia) Jaimon Lidsey	0,3,1,0,1	5
14	(United Kingdom) Anders Rowe	0,0,2,1,1	4
15	(United States) Luke Becker	0,0,0,0,3	3
16	(Australia) Keynan Rew	2,1,0,0,0	3
17	(Italy) Nicolas Vicentin (res)	-,-,-,-,1	1

· Jack Holder withdrew due to injury and was replaced by Maciej Janowski. Paco Castagna was given the wildcard.
