= 2026 Speedway European Championship =

Speedway competition

Season details
- Dates: 25 April – 2 October 2026
- Events: 4
- Cities: 4
- Countries: 3
- Riders: 15 permanents 1 wild card(s); 2 track reserves
- Heats: (in 4 events)

Winners
- Champion: DEN Leon Madsen
- Runner-up: POL Maciej Janowski
- 3rd place: POL Kacper Woryna

The 2026 Speedway European Championship season was the 14th season of the Speedway European Championship (SEC) era, and the 26th Individual Speedway European Championship.

The winner of the title was ensured qualification for the 2027 Speedway Grand Prix series, but Leon Madsen has had already qualified as top 7.

== Qualification ==
=== Qualifiers ===
The top 5 riders from each round qualified for the SEC Challenge.

Round	Date	Venue	Winner
QR1	25 April	(Austria) Speedway Center Mureck, Mureck	(Poland) Paweł Przedpełski
QR2	25 April	(Germany) Paul Greifzu Stadium, Stralsund	(Denmark) Rasmus Jensen
QR3	16 May	(France) Piste de Speedway de Lamothe Landerron, Lamothe-Landerron	(Denmark) Mikkel Michelsen

=== Q1 ===
- 25 APR
- (Austria) Speedway Center Mureck, Mureck

Pos.	Rider	Details	Points
1	(Poland) Paweł Przedpełski	3, 3, 2, 3, 3	14
2	(Czech Republic) Adam Bednář	3, 3, 2, 3, 2	13
3	(Czech Republic) Jan Kvěch	3, 2, 3, 3, 1	12
4	(Poland) Maciej Janowski	3, 2, 3, 3, X	11
5	(Finland) / (Sweden) Timo Lahti	2, 3, 3, 1, 2	11
6	(Denmark) Jonas Knudsen	2, 2, 1, 2, 3	10
7	(United Kingdom) Leon Flint	1, 2, 2, 2, 2	9
8	(Ukraine) Stanislav Melnychuk	0, 1, 3, 1, 3	8
9	(Germany) Norick Blödorn	1, 3, 0, 1, 3	8
10	(Austria) Sebastian Kössler	2, 1, 1, 0, 2	6
11	(Slovenia) Matic Ivačič	1, 0, 2, 2, 0	5
12	(Italy) Nicolas Vicentin	2, 0, X, 2, 1	5
13	(Hungary) Zoltan Lovas	0, 1, 1, 0, 1	3
14	(Latvia) Daniils Kolodinskis	X, 1, 1, X, -	2
15	(Bulgaria) Milen Manev	1, 0, 0, 0, X	1
16	(Slovenia) Luka Omerzel	1	1
17	(Romania) Andrei Popa	X, 0, 0, 0, 0	0
18	(Slovenia) Gregor Zorko	0	0

=== Q2 ===
- 25 APR
- (Germany) Paul Greifzu Stadium, Stralsund

Pos.	Rider	Details	Points
1	(Denmark) Rasmus Jensen	3, 3, 0, 3, 3	12+3
2	(Poland) Piotr Pawlicki	3, 2, 3, 2, 2	12+2
3	(Poland) Przemysław Pawlicki	3, 3, 1, 3, 2	12+1
4	(United Kingdom) Tom Brennan	3, 0, 2, 3, 3	11
5	(Sweden) Kim Nilsson	X, 2, 3, 3, 3	11
6	(Czech Republic) Václav Milík Jr.	2, 1, 3, 2, 2	10
7	(Germany) Kevin Wölbert	2, 1, 3, 0, 3	9
8	(Sweden) Jacob Thorssell	2, 3, 2, 1, 1	9
9	(Norway) Mathias Pollestad	1, 3, 1, 1, 2	8
10	(France) Dimitri Bergé	1, 2, 2, 2, 0	7
11	(Slovenia) Anže Grmek	0, 2, 2, 1, 0	5
12	(Ukraine) Marko Levishyn	0, 1, 1, 2, 1	5
13	(Netherlands) Mika Meijer	2, 0, 0, 1, 1	4
14	(Germany) Mario Häusl	1, 1, 0, 0, 1	3
15	(Latvia) Jevgeņijs Kostigovs	1, 1, 0, 0, 1	3
16	(Finland) Antti Vuolas	0, 0, -, -, -	0
17	(Germany) Hannah Grunwald	X, 0, 0	0
18	(Germany) Erik Riss	DNR	0

=== Q3 ===
- 16 May
- (France) Piste de Speedway de Lamothe Landerron, Lamothe-Landerron

Pos.	Rider	Details	Points
1	(Denmark) Mikkel Michelsen	3, 3, 3, 3, 3	15
2	(France) David Bellego	3, 3, 3, 2, 2	13
3	(United Kingdom) Adam Ellis	2, 3, 2, 3, 2	12
4	(Germany) Kai Huckenbeck	2, 3, 2, 2, 3	12
5	(Denmark) Mads Hansen	3, 1, 3, 1, 3	11
6	(Sweden) Oliver Berntzon	1, 1, 2, 3, 3	10
7	(Poland) Grzegorz Zengota	1, 2, 3, 2, 2	10
8	(France) / (Austria) Steven Goret	2, 2, 1, 3, 1	9
9	(Germany) Valentin Grobauer	3, 1, 0, 1, 1	6
10	(Italy) Michele Castagna	0, 2, 1, 2, 1	6
11	(Czech Republic) Daniel Klima	1, 0, 2, 0, 2	5
12	(Norway) Glenn Moi	2, 1, 0, 0, 0	3
13	(Slovenia) Sven Cerjak	1, 2, 0, X, 0	3
14	(France) Mathias Tresarrieu	0, 1, 1	2
15	(Finland) Otto Raak	0, 0, 0, 1, 0	1
16	(Norway) Truls Kamhaug	X, 0, 1, 0, -	1
17	(France) Jordan Dubernard	1, 0	1
18	(Latvia) Francis Gusts	X, -, -, -, -	0

=== SEC Challenge ===
The top six riders from the SEC Challenge qualified for the championship series.

Round	Date	Venue	Winner
SEC	13 Jun	(Italy) Santa Marina Stadium, Lonigo	(Czech Republic) Jan Kvěch

Pos.	Rider	Details	Points
1	(Czech Republic) Jan Kvěch	3, 2, 3, 3	11
2	(Poland) Maciej Janowski	2, 2, 3, 2	9
3	(Denmark) Mikkel Michelsen	1, 3, 3, 1	8
4	(Denmark) Rasmus Jensen	0, 3, 1, 3	7
5	(Poland) Przemysław Pawlicki	3, D, 3, 1	7
6	(Poland) Piotr Pawlicki	3, 1, 2, 1	7
7	(Denmark) Mads Hansen	1, 3, 1, 1	6
8	(United Kingdom) Adam Ellis	2, 2, 2, 0	6
9	(Poland) Paweł Przedpełski	0, 3, 0, 2	5
10	(Argentina) / (Italy) Nicolás Covatti	3, X, X, 2	5
11	(Sweden) Kim Nilsson	1, 1, X, 3	5
12	(United Kingdom) Tom Brennan	2, 1, 2, 0	5
13	(France) David Bellego	1, 0, 2, 2	5
14	(Germany) Kai Huckenbeck	2, 2, 1, 0	5
15	(Finland) / (Sweden) Timo Lahti	0, X, 0, 3	3
16	(Czech Republic) Adam Bednář	0, D, 1, 0	1
17	(Italy) Giovanni Nichele	F	0
18	(Italy) Kevin Melato	DNR	0

== Championship Series ==
=== Qualified riders ===
Top 6 riders from previous edition, top 6 from SEC Challenge joined by 3 permanent wild cards.

#	Riders	2025 place	SEC Ch place	Appearance
692	(Poland) Patryk Dudek	1	—	7th
29	(Latvia) Andžejs Ļebedevs	2	—	10th
30	(Denmark) Leon Madsen	3	—	11th
223	(Poland) Kacper Woryna	4	—	7th
785	(Ukraine) Nazar Parnitskyi	5	—	2nd
52	(Denmark) Michael Jepsen Jensen	6	—	6th
201	(Czech Republic) Jan Kvěch	22	1	2nd
71	(Poland) Maciej Janowski	—	2	2nd
155	(Denmark) Mikkel Michelsen	—	3	8th
67	(Denmark) Rasmus Jensen	16	4	3rd
59	(Poland) Przemysław Pawlicki	12	5	5th
777	(Poland) Piotr Pawlicki	18	6	6th
299	(United Kingdom) Adam Ellis	—	8	3rd
744	(Germany) Kai Huckenbeck	13	14	7th
999	(Norway) Mathias Pollestad	—	—	1st

=== Qualified reserve ===
#	Riders	2025 place	SEC Ch place
233	(Sweden) Kim Nilsson	—	11
	(Argentina) / (Italy) Nicolás Covatti	—	10
	(Denmark) Mads Hansen	—	7
27	(United Kingdom) Tom Brennan	—	12
415	(France) David Bellego	—	13

=== Wild cards and track reserve ===
Round	Wild card (16)	R1 (17)	R2 (18)
1	(Poland) Damian Ratajczak	(Poland) Oskar Hurysz	(Poland) Paweł Sitek
2	(Germany) Tyler Haupt	(Germany) Hannah Grunwald	(Germany) Eric Pudel
3	(Poland) Oskar Fajfer	(Poland) Krzysztof Sadurski	(Poland) Adrian Przybyło
4	(Czech Republic) Václav Milík	(Czech Republic) Daniel Klima	(Czech Republic) Adam Nejezchleba

=== Results ===
The 2026 series will be staged over four rounds.

Round	Date	Venue	Winner
1	18 July	(Poland) Swiss Krono Arena, Zielona Góra	(Denmark) Leon Madsen
2	5 September	(Germany) Güstrow Speedway Stadium, Güstrow	(Poland) Maciej Janowski
3	19 September	(Poland) Stal Rzeszów Municipal Stadium, Rzeszów	(Poland) Kacper Woryna
4	2 October	(Czech Republic) Svítkov Stadium, Pardubice	(Poland) Maciej Janowski

== Final Classification ==
Pos.	Rider	Points	(Poland)	(Germany)	(Poland)	(Czech Republic)
1	(Denmark) (30) Leon Madsen	47	14	10	10	13
2	(Poland) (71) Maciej Janowski	46	6	13	14	13
3	(Poland) (223) Kacper Woryna	42	8	10	16	8
4	(Denmark) (52) Michael Jepsen Jensen	41	13	11	9	8
5	(Denmark) (155) Mikkel Michelsen	40	11	9	8	12
6	(Poland) (692) Patryk Dudek	38	14	8	8	8
7	(Czech Republic) (201) Jan Kvěch	38	7	13	9	9
8	(Germany) (744) Kai Huckenbeck	34	12	8	6	8
9	(Poland) (59) Przemysław Pawlicki	32	7	8	8	9
10	(Latvia) (29) Andžejs Ļebedevs	30	6	3	11	10
11	(Norway) (999) Mathias Pollestad	23	9	2	6	6
12	(Poland) (777) Piotr Pawlicki	22	8	4	5	5
13	(United Kingdom) (299) Adam Ellis	19	3	8	4	4
14	(Ukraine) (785) Nazar Parnitskyi	14	0	5	5	4
15	(Sweden) (233) Kim Nilsson	14	6	–	4	4
16	(United Kingdom) (27) Tom Brennan	10	–	10	–	–
27	(Czech Republic) (16) Václav Milík	5	–	–	–	5
18	(Germany) (16) Tyler Haupt	4	–	4	–	–
19	(Poland) (16) Oskar Fajfer	3	–	–	3	–
20	(Poland) (16) Damian Ratajczak	2	2	–	–	–

Dudek beat Kvěch in race off for 6th place.

== See also ==
- 2026 Speedway Grand Prix
- 2026 European Pairs Speedway Championship
- 2026 European Team Speedway Championship
