= 2024 Speedway Grand Prix of Latvia =

Speedway Grand Prix event

- Venue: Biķernieki Speedway Stadium
- Location: Riga (Latvia)
- Start date: 7 September 2024
- Competitors: 16 (2 reserves)

The 2024 FIM Speedway Grand Prix of Latvia was the ninth round of the 2024 Speedway Grand Prix season (the World Championship of speedway). It took place on 7 September at the Biķernieki Speedway Stadium in Riga, Latvia. It was the 10th time that the Speedway Grand Prix of Latvia was held.

The event was won by Bartosz Zmarzlik (his 25th career Grand Prix win). Zmarzlik was fortunate not to be excluded after a heat 4 crash with Mikkel Michelsen as the pair tangled. The referee Jesper Steentoft controversially excluded Michelesen, who sustained significant injuries to his right shoulder, humerus and elbow.

== Grand Prix result ==
Placing	Rider	1	2	3	4	5	6	7	8	9	10	11	12	13	14	15	16	17	18	19	20	Pts	SF1	SF2	Final	GP Pts
1	(Poland) (15) Bartosz Zmarzlik				1			3			0						2	3				9	2		3	20
2	(Sweden) (14) Fredrik Lindgren				2		3					3		1							0	9	3		2	18
3	(United Kingdom) (5) Dan Bewley		2			2					1					3					3	11		3	1	16
4	(Australia) (12) Max Fricke			2					2		2			2						2		10		2	0	14
5	(Poland) (1) Maciej Janowski	2				3				1				3				1				10		1		12
6	(United Kingdom) (9) Robert Lambert			3		1						2					1		3			10	1			11
7	(Latvia) (4) Andžejs Ļebedevs	3							3				3				3				2	14	0			10
8	(Denmark) (2) Leon Madsen	1					2				3				2				1			9		0		9
9	(Germany) (16) Kai Huckenbeck				3				0	3						0			2			8				8
10	(Slovakia) (8) Martin Vaculík		3						1			1			3			0				8				7
11	(Czech Republic) (11) Jan Kvěch			1				2		2					1						1	7				6
12	(Poland) (10) Dominik Kubera			0			1						1			2		2				6				5
13	(Poland) (6) Szymon Woźniak		1				0			0							0			3		4				4
14	(Latvia) (3) Daniils Kolodinskis	0						1				0				1				1		3				3
15	(Australia) (7) Jack Holder		0					0					2	0					x			2				2
16	(Denmark) (13) Mikkel Michelsen				x	ns							ns		ns					ns		0				0
R1	(Latvia) (R1) Francis Gusts					0									0							0	R1			
R2	(Latvia) (R2) Ričards Ansviesulis												0							0		0	R2			

m - exclusion for exceeding two minute time allowance • t - exclusion for touching the tapes • x - other exclusion • e - retired or mechanical failure • f - fell • ns - non-starter • nc - non-classify

gate A - inside	gate B	gate C	gate D - outside
