= 2024 Speedway European Championship =

Speedway competition

Season details
- Dates: 8 June – 21 September
- Events: 4
- Cities: 4
- Countries: 3
- Riders: 15 permanents 1 wild card(s); 2 track reserves
- Heats: (in 4 events)

Winners
- Champion: LVA Andžejs Ļebedevs
- Runner-up: DEN Leon Madsen
- 3rd place: POL Kacper Woryna

The 2024 Speedway European Championship season was the 12th season of the Speedway European Championship (SEC) era, and the 24th Individual Speedway European Championship. It was won by Andžejs Ļebedevs of Latvia, who finished ahead of Leon Madsen and Kacper Woryna. It was the second time Ļebedevs won the title having already taking top honours in 2017.

As a result of winning the title, Ļebedevs also ensured qualification for the 2025 Speedway Grand Prix series.

== Qualification ==
The top five riders from the 2023 Speedway European Championship were joined by five riders who qualified through the SEC Challenge. Another five permanent series riders were picked by the SEC Commission. These 15 permanent riders were joined at each SEC Final by one wildcard and two track reserves.

=== Qualifiers ===
The top four riders from each heat qualified for the SEC Challenge.

Round	Date	Venue	Winner
QR1	1 May	(Hungary) Perényi Pál Salakmotor Stadion, Debrecen	(Denmark) Anders Thomsen
QR2	1 May	(Austria) Speedway Center Mureck, Mureck	(Finland) / (Sweden) Timo Lahti
QR3	4 May	(Germany) Paul Greifzu Stadium, Stralsund	(Poland) Maciej Janowski
QR4	4 May	(Slovenia) Matija Gubec Stadium, Krško	(Poland) Mateusz Cierniak

=== Round One ===
- 1 May 2024
- (Hungary) Debrecen (Perényi Pál Salakmotor Stadion)

Pos.	Rider	Points	Details
1	(Denmark) Anders Thomsen	15	(3,3,3,3,3)
2	(Sweden) Jacob Thorssell	14	(3,3,2,3,3)
3	(Latvia) Jevgeņijs Kostigovs	12	(2,3,1,3,3)
4	(Poland) Kacper Woryna	12	(3,2,3,2,2)
5	(Sweden) Antonio Lindbäck	12	(3,2,3,1,3)
6	(Ukraine) Stanislav Melnychuk	9	(2,1,2,2,2)
7	(Germany) Marius Hillebrand	8	(0,3,2,2,1)
8	(United Kingdom) Adam Ellis	8	(1,2,3,0,2)
9	(Ukraine) Marko Levishyn	7	(2,2,2,x,1)
10	(Germany) Sandro Wassermann	6	(1,1,1,3,0)
11	(Hungary) Norbert Magosi	5	(1,1,0,2,1)
12	(Czech Republic) Jan Janicek	4	(2,1,0,1,0)
13	(France) Tino Bouin	3	(1,0,1,1,0)
14	(Finland) Niklas Säyriö	2	(0,0,0,0,2)
15	(Germany) Julian Kuny	1	(0,0,x,x,1)
16	(Slovenia) Luka Omerzel	1	(0,0,1,0,F)
17	(Hungary) Roland Kovacs (res)	1	(1)

=== Round Two ===
- 1 May 2024
- (Austria) Mureck (Speedway Center Mureck)

Pos.	Rider	Points	Details
1	(Finland) / (Sweden) Timo Lahti	14	(2,3,3,3,3)
2	(Denmark) Frederik Jakobsen	12	(3,3,2,1,3)
3	(Germany) Erik Riss	12	(3,2,3,2,2)
4	(Poland) Bartłomiej Kowalski	11+3	(1,3,2,3,2)
5	(United Kingdom) Tom Brennan	11+2	(2,1,3,2,3)
6	(Poland) Jarosław Hampel	10	(1,2,3,3,1)
7	(Latvia) Ričards Ansviesulis	10	(3,2,1,2,2)
8	(Ukraine) Andriy Karpov	7	(3,0,1,x,3)
9	(Austria) Daniel Gappmaier	7	(0,3,2,1,1)
10	(Czech Republic) Jan Macek	6	(2,1,2,x,1)
11	(Czech Republic) Hynek Štichauer	5	(2,1,1,0,1)
12	(France) Mathias Trésarrieu	4	(1,0,0,3,0)
13	(Slovakia) Jakub Valkovič	4	(0,2,0,2,0)
14	(Ukraine) Roman Kapustin	3	(0,1,1,1,0)
15	(Italy) Nicolas Vicentin	4	(1,0,0,x,2)
16	(Bulgaria) Milen Manev	0	(0,0,x,x,0)

=== Round Three ===
- 4 May 2024
- (Germany) Stralsund (Paul Greifzu Stadium)

Pos.	Rider	Points	Details
1	(Poland) Maciej Janowski	14+3	(3,3,2,3,3)
2	(Poland) Przemysław Pawlicki	14+2	(3,2,3,3,3)
3	(Denmark) Rasmus Jensen	14+1	(3,3,3,2,3)
4	(France) Dimitri Bergé	11	(3,3,3,1,1)
5	(Sweden) Kim Nilsson	10	(2,1,1,3,3)
6	(Sweden) Oliver Berntzon	9	(1,3,1,2,2)
7	(United Kingdom) Steve Worrall	8	(1,2,2,3,0)
8	(Denmark) Benjamin Basso	8	(2,2,1,2,1)
9	(Latvia) Daniils Kolodinskis	8	(2,1,2,1,2)
10	(Germany) Kevin Wölbert	7	(1,1,3,0,2)
11	(Czech Republic) Eduard Krčmář	6	(2,2,0,2,0)
12	(Latvia) Oļegs Mihailovs	4	(0,0,2,1,1)
13	(Germany) Valentin Grobauer	3	(1,0,0,0,2)
14	(Czech Republic) Matouš Kameník	2	(0,1,1,0,x)
15	(Germany) Celina Liebmann (res)	1	(1)
16	(Italy) Niccolò Percotti	1	(0,0,0,1,0)
17	(Norway) Glenn Moi	0	(0,0,0,0,0)

=== Round Four ===
- 4 May 2024
- (Slovenia) Krško (Matija Gubec Stadium)

Pos.	Rider	Points	Details
1	(Poland) Mateusz Cierniak	15	(3,3,3,3,3)
2	(Poland) Piotr Pawlicki	14	(3,3,3,2,3)
3	(Czech Republic) Václav Milík	12	(1,2,3,3,3)
4	(Denmark) Andreas Lyager	11+3	(3,3,2,1,2)
5	(Slovenia) Anže Grmek	11+2	(3,1,1,3,3)
6	(Germany) Norick Blödorn	10	(2,2,3,2,1)
7	(Italy) Paco Castagna	9	(0,2,2,3,2)
8	(Latvia) Francis Gusts	9	(1,3,1,2,2)
9	(Slovenia) Matic Ivačič	6	(2,0,2,1,1)
10	(Netherlands) Henry van der Steen	6	(2,1,1,2,0)
11	(Norway) Truls Kamhaug	4	(1,2,1,0,x)
12	(Slovenia) Denis Štojs	3	(0,0,0,1,2)
13	(France) David Bellego	3	(1 0,2,x,x)
14	(France) Steven Goret	3	(2,1,0,x,0)
15	(Italy) Andrea Battaglia	2	(F,1,0,0,1)
16	(Romania) Andrei Popa	1	(0,0,0,0,1)

=== SEC Challenge ===
The top five riders from the SEC Challenge qualified for the championship series.

Round	Date	Venue	Winner
SEC	12 May	(Latvia) Stadium Lokomotīve, Daugavpils	(Poland) Maciej Janowski

Pos.	Rider	Points	Details
1	(Poland) Maciej Janowski	12	(3,2,3,3,1)
2	(Poland) Piotr Pawlicki	11	(0,3,3,2,3)
3	(Czech Republic) Václav Milík	11	(1,3,3,1,3)
4	(Poland) Kacper Woryna	9+3	(1,2,1,2,3)
5	(Latvia) Jevgeņijs Kostigovs	9+2	(2,1,2,2,2)
6	(Finland) / (Sweden) Timo Lahti	9+1	(1,2,2,3,1)
7	(Poland) Bartłomiej Kowalski	9+0	(3,1,3,0,2)
8	(Poland) Przemysław Pawlicki	8	(2,1,2,0,3)
9	(Denmark) Anders Thomsen	7	(1,3,R,3,R)
10	(France) Dimitri Bergé	7	(3,0,2,2,0)
11	(Denmark) Rasmus Jensen	7	(0,3,1,1,2)
12	(Poland) Mateusz Cierniak	7	(2,2,0,1,2)
13	(Denmark) Frederik Jakobsen	4	(0,0,1,3,0)
14	(Sweden) Jacob Thorssell	4	(3,0,0,1,0)
15	(Germany) Erik Riss	3	(2,R,0,0,1)
16	(Denmark) Andreas Lyager	3	(0,1,1,0,1)

== Championship Series ==
=== Qualified riders ===
#	Riders	2023 place	SEC Ch place	Appearance
155	(Denmark) Mikkel Michelsen	1	-	7th
30	(Denmark) Leon Madsen	2	-	9th
333	(Poland) Janusz Kołodziej	3	-	6th
692	(Poland) Patryk Dudek	4	-	5th
129	(Latvia) Andžejs Ļebedevs	5	-	8th
71	(Poland) Maciej Janowski	-	1	1st
777	(Poland) Piotr Pawlicki	-	2	4th
225	(Czech Republic) Václav Milík	18	3	10th
223	(Poland) Kacper Woryna	8	4	5th
113	(Latvia) Jevgeņijs Kostigovs	-	5	1st
98	(Finland) / (Sweden) Timo Lahti	19	6	3rd
105	(Denmark) Anders Thomsen	-	9	3rd
96	(France) Dimitri Bergé	9	10	3rd
67	(Denmark) Rasmus Jensen	-	11	2nd
37	(Germany) Norick Blödorn	20	-	1st

=== Results ===
The 2024 series was staged over four rounds.

Round	Date	Venue	Winner
1	8 June	(Hungary) Perényi Pál Salakmotor Stadion, Debrecen	(Latvia) Andžejs Ļebedevs
2	20 July	(Poland) Grudziądz Speedway Stadium, Grudziądz	(Denmark) Leon Madsen
3	24 August	(Germany) Güstrow Speedway Stadium, Güstrow	(Latvia) Andžejs Ļebedevs
4	21 September	(Poland) Stadion Śląski, Chorzów	(Denmark) Anders Thomsen

== Final Classification ==
Pos.	Rider	Points	(Hungary)	(Poland)	(Germany)	(Poland)
1	(Latvia) (29) Andžejs Ļebedevs	50	17	7	15	11
2	(Denmark) (30) Leon Madsen	47	5	14	14	14
3	(Poland) (223) Kacper Woryna	44	9	15	9	11
4	(Denmark) (105) Anders Thomsen	41	9	8	7	17
5	(Poland) (777) Piotr Pawlicki Jr.	40	9	14	9	8
6	(Poland) (692) Patryk Dudek	36	10	7	9	10
7	(Denmark) (67) Rasmus Jensen	33	7	7	11	8
8	(Poland) (71) Maciej Janowski	32	12	7	8	5
9	(Sweden) (98) Timo Lahti	28	8	7	9	4
10	(Denmark) (155) Mikkel Michelsen	25	10	10	5	–
11	(Sweden) (24) Jacob Thorssell	22	11	–	5	6
12	(Poland) (46) Janusz Kołodziej	17	–	10	7	–
13	(France) (96) Dimitri Bergé	15	–	3	9	3
14	(Germany) (37) Norick Blödorn	15	4	3	5	3
15	(Australia) (16) Max Fricke	10	–	10	–	–
16	(Poland) (17) Robert Chmiel	10	–	–	–	10
17	(Latvia) (113) Jevgeņijs Kostigovs	10	5	1	2	2
18	(Czech Republic) (225) Václav Milík Jr.	9	6	3	–	–
19	(Poland) (302) Bartłomiej Kowalski	9	4	–	–	5
20	(United Kingdom) (27) Tom Brennan	6	–	–	–	6
21	(Germany) (16) Kevin Wölbert	2	–	–	2	–
22	(Denmark) (18) Tim Sørensen	2	–	–	–	2
23	(Hungary) (16) Norbert Magosi	0	0	–	–	–
24	(Germany) (17) Lukas Baumann	0	–	–	0	–

== See also ==
- 2024 Speedway Grand Prix
