= 2024 Speedway Grand Prix of Germany =

Speedway Grand Prix event

- Venue: Ellermühle Speedway Stadium
- Location: Landshut
- Start date: 18 May 2024
- Competitors: 16 (2 reserves)

The 2024 Trans MF FIM Speedway Grand Prix of Germany was the third race of the 2024 Speedway Grand Prix season. It took place on 18 May at the Ellermühle Speedway Stadium, known as the OneSolar Arena for sponsorship purposes, in Landshut, Germany. It was the 14th Speedway Grand Prix of Germany.

The event was won by Dane Mikkel Michelsen, who won his maiden Grand Prix.

== Grand Prix result ==
Placing	Rider	1	2	3	4	5	6	7	8	9	10	11	12	13	14	15	16	17	18	19	20	Pts	SF1	SF2	Final	GP Pts
1	(Denmark) (11) Mikkel Michelsen			0				3		3					2						2	10	2		3	20
2	(Poland) (13) Bartosz Zmarzlik				3	2							3		1					3		12	3		2	18
3	(Australia) (9) Jack Holder			2		1						1					2		3			9		3	1	16
4	(Poland) (5) Dominik Kubera		2			0					3					3					3	11		2	0	14
5	(United Kingdom) (2) Robert Lambert	2					1				2				3				2			10		1		12
6	(Denmark) (12) Leon Madsen			3					1		1			3						1		9	1			11
7	(United Kingdom) (8) Dan Bewley		3						2			3			0			3				11		0		10
8	(Australia) (4) Jason Doyle	3							3				2				1				0	9	0			9
9	(Poland) (1) Szymon Woźniak	1				3				0				2				2				8				8
10	(United Kingdom) (15) Tai Woffinden				2			2			0						3	1				8				7
11	(Slovakia) (14) Martin Vaculík				1		3					2		1							1	8				6
12	(Germany) (16) Kai Huckenbeck				0				0	2						2			1			5				5
13	(Latvia) (10) Andžejs Ļebedevs			1			2						1			1		0				5				4
14	(Sweden) (6) Freddie Lindgren		1				0			1							0			2		4				3
15	(Germany) (3) Norick Blödorn	0						1				0				0				0		1				2
16	(Czech Republic) (7) Jan Kvěch		0					0					0	ns					ns			0				1
R1	(Germany) (R1) Martin Smolinski													0								0	R1			
R2	(Germany) (R2) Erik Riss																		0			0	R2			

m - exclusion for exceeding two minute time allowance • t - exclusion for touching the tapes • x - other exclusion • e - retired or mechanical failure • f - fell • ns - non-starter • nc - non-classify

gate A - inside	gate B	gate C	gate D - outside
