= 2024 Speedway Grand Prix of Denmark =

Speedway Grand Prix event

- Venue: Vojens Speedway Center
- Location: Vojens (Denmark)
- Start date: 14 September 2024
- Competitors: 16 (2 reserves)

The 2024 FIM Speedway Grand Prix of Denmark was the tenth round of the 2024 Speedway Grand Prix season (the World Championship of speedway). It took place on 14 September at the Vojens Speedway Center in Vojens, Denmark. It was the 29th time that the Speedway Grand Prix of Denmark had been held.

The event was won by Robert Lambert (his maiden career Grand Prix win). The officials struggled with the track preparation and were unable to avert a track bias which saw 13 of the 23 heats won from the inside gate (red).

By finishing runner-up in the Grand Prix, the defending champion Bartosz Zmarzlik secured a fifth world title, equalling the achievement of Ove Fundin.

== Grand Prix result ==
Placing	Rider	1	2	3	4	5	6	7	8	9	10	11	12	13	14	15	16	17	18	19	20	Pts	SF1	SF2	Final	GP Pts
1	(United Kingdom) (8) Robert Lambert		1						2			3			1			3				10		2	3	20
2	(Poland) (13) Bartosz Zmarzlik				2	3							3		2					2		12	3		2	18
3	(Poland) (9) Maciej Janowski			3		2						2					0		3			10		3	1	16
4	(Latvia) (16) Andžejs Ļebedevs				1				3	3						1			1			9	2		0	14
5	(Slovakia) (2) Martin Vaculík	2					1				2				3				2			10	1			12
6	(United Kingdom) (12) Dan Bewley			1					0		3			2						3		9		1		11
7	(Poland) (4) Dominik Kubera	1							1				1				3				3	9	0			10
8	(Denmark) (7) Rasmus Jensen		2					2					2	3					0			9		0		9
9	(Australia) (5) Max Fricke		3			0					1					2					2	8				8
10	(Denmark) (15) Anders Thomsen				3			3			0						1	0				7				7
11	(Sweden) (1) Kim Nilsson	3				1				2				0				1				7				6
12	(Czech Republic) (3) Jan Kvěch	0						0				1				3				1		5				5
13	(Germany) (14) Kai Huckenbeck				0		3					0		1							0	4				4
14	(Sweden) (10) Freddie Lindgren			x			2						0			1		2				5				3
15	(Australia) (11) Jack Holder			2				1		0					0						1	4				2
16	(Poland) (6) Szymon Woźniak		0				0			1							2			0		3				1
R1	(Denmark) (R1) Frederik Jakobsen																					0	R1			
R2	(Denmark) (R2) Mads Hansen																					0	R2			

m - exclusion for exceeding two minute time allowance • t - exclusion for touching the tapes • x - other exclusion • e - retired or mechanical failure • f - fell • ns - non-starter • nc - non-classify

gate A - inside	gate B	gate C	gate D - outside
