= 2027 Speedway Grand Prix =

33rd season of Speedway Grand Pix

Season details
- Dates: 1 May – 30 October
- Events: 11
- Cities: 10
- Countries: 8
- Riders: 15 permanents 1 wild card(s); 2 track reserves
- Heats: (in 11 events)

The 2027 Speedway Grand Prix season will be the 33rd season of the Speedway Grand Prix era, and will decide the 82nd FIM Speedway World Championship. It will be the second series promoted by Mayfield Sports Events Ltd.

Robert Lambert will be the defending champion having won the title in 2026.

The series will return to Australia for the first time since 2017 with Gillman Speedway in Adelaide staging the final two rounds of the competition. Foxhall Stadium in Ipswich will also stage the British Speedway Grand Prix for the first time, replacing the National Speedway Stadium.

== Qualification ==
For the 2027 season there will be 15 permanent riders, who will be joined at each Grand Prix by one wild card and two track reserves. The top seven riders from the 2026 championship qualified automatically. These riders are joined by the four riders who qualified via the Grand Prix Challenge and the 2026 Speedway European Championship winner, however Robert Lambert (Grand Prix Challenge winner) and Leon Madsen (SEC winner) had already qualified due to finishing in the top seven of the 2026 series. As a result Andžejs Ļebedevs qualified from fifth place in the Grand Prix Challenge and the final four (not three) riders were nominated by the SGP Commission.

=== Qualified riders ===
#	Riders	2026 place	GP Ch place	2026 SEC place	Permanent rider appearance	Previous appearances in series	Career best
505	(United Kingdom) Robert Lambert	1	1	—	7th	2015, 2018–2019, 2021–2026	1st
95	(Poland) Bartosz Zmarzlik	2	—	—	12th	2012–2015, 2016–2026	1st
101	(Australia) Brady Kurtz	3	—	—	3rd	2016-2017, 2025-2026	2nd
52	(Denmark) Michael Jepsen Jensen	4	6	4	3rd	2012-2014, 2015, 2016-2018, 2025, 2026	4th
692	(Poland) Patryk Dudek	5	—	6	8th	2016, 2017–2020, 2022-2023, 2024-2025, 2026	2nd
30	(Denmark) Leon Madsen	6	—	1	8th	2010, 2013, 2019–2024, 2025, 2026	2nd
46	(Australia) Max Fricke	7	—	—	7th	2016–2017, 2019, 2020–2023, 2024, 2025-2026	7th
27	(Australia) Rohan Tungate	—	2	—	1st	2017	—
223	(Poland) Kacper Woryna	8	3	3	2nd	2016, 2022, 2026	8th
233	(Sweden) Kim Nilsson	20	4	15	2nd	2012–2014, 2016–2017, 2024, 2025-2026	13th
29	(Latvia) Andžejs Ļebedevs	10	5	10	4th	2013–2014, 2022–2023, 2024-2026	6th
25	(Australia) Jack Holder	12	—	—	6th	2016, 2020, 2022–2026	4th
66	(Sweden) Fredrik Lindgren	15	—	—	18th	2004, 2006–2007, 2008–2014, 2016, 2017–2026	2nd
99	(United Kingdom) Dan Bewley	16	—	—	6th	2018, 2022–2026	3rd
71	(Poland) Maciej Janowski	19	9	2	10th	2008, 2012, 2014, 2015–2023, 2024-2026	3rd

=== Qualified substitutes ===
The following riders were nominated as substitutes:

#	Riders	2026 place	GP Ch place	2026 SEC place
201	(Czech Republic) Jan Kvěch	13	—	7
41	(Denmark) Frederik Jakobsen	21	7	—
744	(Germany) Kai Huckenbeck	18	11	8
999	(Norway) Mathias Pollestad	—	—	11
785	(Ukraine) Nazar Parnitskyi	17	—	14

== Calendar ==
The 2027 season consists of 11 events. Round four is yet to be announced.

Round	Date	City and venue	Winner	Runner-up	3rd placed	4th placed	Results
1	1 May	(Croatia) Goričan, Croatia; Donji Kraljevec					results
2	15 May	(Poland) Warsaw, Poland; Stadion Narodowy					results
3	29 May	(Czech Republic) Prague, Czech Republic; Markéta Stadium					results
5	3 July	(Poland) Wrocław, Poland; Olympic Stadium					results
6	17 July	(Latvia) Riga, Latvia; Riga Speedway Stadium					results
7	14 August	(United Kingdom) Ipswich, Great Britain; Foxhall Stadium					results
8	11 September	(Denmark) Vojens, Denmark; Vojens Speedway Center					results
9	25 September	(Poland) Toruń, Poland; MotoArena Toruń					results
10	29 October	(Australia) Adelaide, Australia; Gillman Speedway					results
11	30 October	(Australia) Adelaide, Australia; Gillman Speedway					results
