= 2024 Speedway Grand Prix Qualification =

World speedway event

Speedway Grand Prix Qualification
- Dates: 27 May to 19 Aug 2023

The 2024 Individual Speedway World Championship Grand Prix Qualification or GP Challenge was a series of motorcycle speedway meetings held during 2023 to determine the riders that qualified for the 2024 Speedway Grand Prix. The series consisted of four qualifying rounds at Žarnovica, Lonigo, Debrecen and Abensberg and the Grand Prix Challenge at Gislaved.

Preliminary qualification events included the Grand Prix qualifier in Denmark and the Golden Helmet/Grand Prix qualifier in Poland.

The qualifying riders progressed to the 2024 Speedway Grand Prix, where they were joined by the riders who finished in the leading positions of the 2023 Speedway Grand Prix.

== National Qualifying Events ==
=== DMU Qualifier (Denmark) ===
- Top four riders qualified for the FIM Qualifying rounds.

== FIM Qualifying rounds ==
=== Round One ===
- 27 May 2023
- (Slovakia) Žarnovica (Speedway stadium Žarnovica)

Pos.	Rider	Points	Details
1	(Slovakia) Martin Vaculík	14	(2,3,3,3,3)
2	(Poland) Szymon Woźniak	13	(3,2,3,2,3)
3	(United States) Luke Becker	12+3	(3,3,2,3,1)
4	(Denmark) Frederik Jakobsen	12+2	(1,3,3,3,2)
5	(United Kingdom) Robert Lambert	12+1	(2,2,3,3,2)
6	(Australia) Max Fricke	11	(3,2,2,1,3)
7	(Poland) Bartosz Smektała	9	(3,1,1,2,2)
8	(Sweden) Filip Hjelmland	8	(2,3,2,0,1)
9	(Slovenia) Nick Škorja	7	(1,1,2,2,1)
10	(Czech Republic) Václav Milík	5	(0,0,1,1,3)
11	(Sweden) Victor Palovaara	5	(1,1,1,2,0)
12	(Czech Republic) Daniel Klíma	4	(0,2,1,1,0)
13	(Italy) Nicolas Vicentin	3	(0,T,0,1,2)
14	(Germany) Lukas Fienhage	2	(2,0,0,0,0)
15	(United States) Max Ruml	2	(0,1,0,0,1)
16	(Ukraine) Vitalii Lysak	1	(1,0,0,0,0)
17	(Slovakia) Jakub Valković	0	(-,0,-,-,-)

=== Round Three ===
- 29 May 2023
- (Hungary) Debrecen (Debrecen Speedway Stadium)

Pos.	Rider	Points	Details
1	(Australia) Jack Holder	13+3	(2,2,3,3,3)
2	(Latvia) Andžejs Ļebedevs	13+2	(3,3,3,1,3)
3	(Denmark) Michael Jepsen Jensen	13+1	(3,2,2,3,3)
4	(Sweden) Jacob Thorssell	12	(3,3,2,1,3)
5	(United Kingdom) Adam Ellis	11	(3,1,3,2,2)
6	(Poland) Janusz Kołodziej	9	(1,1,3,3,1)
7	(Germany) Kai Huckenbeck	9	(0,3,2,2,2)
8	(Finland) Antti Vuolas	8	(1,2,0,3,2)
9	(Czech Republic) Petr Chlupáč	8	(2,2,1,2,1)
10	(Denmark) Andreas Lyager	6	(0,3,0,2,1)
11	(Ukraine) Marko Levishyn	6	(1,0,2,1,2)
12	(Hungary) Norbert Magosi	5	(2,0,1,1,1)
13	(Finland) Timi Salonen	4	(2,1,1,-,-)
14	(Hungary) Roland Kovacs	2	(D,1,1,0,0)
15	(Romania) Andrei Popa	1	(1,0,0,0,0)
16	(Hungary) Márk Bárány	0	(0,0,0,0,0)
17	(Hungary) Richard Fuzesi	0	(-,-,-,0,0)

=== Round Two ===
- 27 May 2023
- (Italy) Lonigo (Santa Marina Stadium)

Pos.	Rider	Points	Details
1	(Poland) Piotr Pawlicki Jr.	13	(2,3,3,2,3)
2	(Italy) Nicolás Covatti	12+3	(3,2,3,1,3)
3	(Czech Republic) Jan Kvěch	12+2	(2,3,2,3,2)
4	(Italy) Michele Paco Castagna	12+1	(3,2,2,3,2)
5	(Sweden) Oliver Berntzon	11	(3,3,0,2,3)
6	(Denmark) Niels Kristian Iversen	10	(2,2,1,3,2)
7	(Finland) Timo Lahti	9	(0,1,3,2,3)
8	(Australia) Jaimon Lidsey	9	(3,3,1,W,2)
9	(United Kingdom) Tom Brennan	8	(1,1,3,2,1)
10	(Slovenia) Matic Ivačič	6	(1,2,2,0,1)
11	(Germany) Marius Hillebrand	5	(0,1,0,3,1)
12	(France) Mathias Trésarrieu	4	(2,0,1,1,W)
13	(Argentina) Carlos Eber Ampugnani	3	(1,1,D,1,W)
14	(Italy) Andrea Battaglia	2	(0,U,2,W,U)
15	(Argentina) Facundo Cuello	2	(1,0,1,0,0)
16	(Slovenia) Denis Štojs	2	(0,0,W,1,1)

=== Round Four ===
- 29 May 2023
- (Germany) Abensberg (Wack Hofmeister Stadium)

Pos.	Rider	Points	Details
1	(Australia) Jason Doyle	13	(3,2,3,3,2)
2	(Poland) Przemysław Pawlicki	12+3	(1,3,3,2,3)
3	(France) Dimitri Bergé	12+2	(0,3,3,3,3)
4	(Germany) Martin Smolinski	12+1	(1,3,2,3,3)
5	(Denmark) Mads Hansen	11	(2,3,1,3,2)
6	(Sweden) Kim Nilsson	10	(2,2,3,2,1)
7	(Germany) Norick Blödorn	9	(3,2,2,0,2)
8	(Germany) Kevin Wölbert	8	(0,2,2,3,1)
9	(Czech Republic) Eduard Krčmář	7	(3,0,2,1,1)
10	(Latvia) Jevgeņijs Kostigovs	7	(2,1,1,2,1)
11	(Australia) Rohan Tungate	7	(2,1,1,1,2)
12	(United Kingdom) Chris Harris	5	(3,1,0,1,D)
13	(Netherlands) Mika Meijer	3	(0,W,1,2,0)
14	(Norway) Glenn Moi	2	(1,1,0,0,0)
15	(Germany) Valentin Grobauer	1	(-,-,-,0,1 )
16	(United States) Gino Manzares	1	(1,U,W,-,-)
17	(Italy) Niccolo Percotti	0	(0,0,0,0,0)

== 2023 Speedway Grand Prix Challenge ==
=== Grand Prix Challenge ===
- 19 August 2023
- (Sweden) Gislaved (OnePartnerGroup Arena)

Pos.	Rider	Points	Total
1	(Australia) Jason Doyle	3, 2, 3, 3, 2	13+3
2	(Slovakia) Martin Vaculik	2, 2, 3, 3, 3	13+2
3	(Poland) Szymon Woźniak	3, 3, 2, 1, 3	12
4	(United Kingdom) Robert Lambert	3, 3, X, 2, 2	10
5	(Czech Republic) Jan Kvěch	2, 1, 2, 2, 3	10
6	(Poland) Przemysław Pawlicki	2, 0, 3, 1, 3	9
7	(Latvia) Andzejs Lebedevs	1, 1, 3, 3, 1	9
8	(United States) Luke Becker	2, 2, 0, 3, 2	9
9	(Sweden) Jacob Thorssell	3, 0, 1, 2, 1	7
10	(France) Dimitri Bergé	0, 3, 1, 1, 1	6
11	(Poland) Piotr Pawlicki Jr.	0, X, 2, 2, 2	6
12	(Denmark) Michael Jepsen Jensen	1, 3, 0, 0, 0	4
13	(Denmark) Frederik Jakobsen	1, 1, 1, R, 1	4
14	(Germany) Martin Smolinski	0, 0, 2, 0, 0	2
15	(Sweden) Oliver Berntzon (res)	2	2
16	(Italy) Paco Castagna	1, 0, 1, 0, 0	2
17	(Italy) Nico Covatti	0, 1, 0, 1, 0	2

== See also ==
- 2024 Speedway Grand Prix
