= 2023 Speedway European Championship =

Speedway competition

Season details
- Dates: 17 June – 22 September
- Events: 4
- Cities: 4
- Countries: 3
- Riders: 15 permanents 1 wild card(s); 2 track reserves
- Heats: (in 4 events)

Winners
- Champion: DEN Mikkel Michelsen
- Runner-up: DEN Leon Madsen
- 3rd place: POL Janusz Kołodziej

The 2023 Speedway European Championship season was the 11th season of the Speedway European Championship (SEC) era, and the 23rd UEM Individual Speedway European Championship. It was the 10th series under the promotion of Polish company One Sport Lts. Danish rider Mikkel Michelsen won the Championship for the third time.

== Qualification ==
For the 2023 season, 15 permanent riders were joined at each SEC Final by one wildcard and two track reserves.

Defending champion, Leon Madsen from Denmark was automatically invited to participate in all final events, while Janusz Kołodziej, Mikkel Michelsen, Patryk Dudek and Dominik Kubera secured their participation in all final events thanks to being in the top five of the general classification in the 2022 season.

Five riders qualified through the SEC Challenge, while the final five riders were handed wildcards by the SEC Commission.

== Calendar ==
=== Qualification ===
The top five riders from the SEC Challenge qualified for the championship series.

Round	Date	Venue	Winner
1	14 May	(Hungary) Nagyhalász Speedway Ring, Nagyhalász	(France) Dimitri Bergé

Nagyhalász
Pos	Rider	Pts
1	(France) Dimitri Bergé	13
2	(Poland) Kacper Woryna	10
3	(Czech Republic) Jan Kvěch	10
4	(Poland) Grzegorz Zengota	10
5	(Denmark) Andreas Lyager	9
6	(Sweden) Antonio Lindbäck	9
7	(Poland) Szymon Woźniak	9
8	(Denmark) Niels-Kristian Iversen	9
9	(Denmark) Mads Hansen	9
10	(Latvia) Andžejs Ļebedevs	8
11	(Finland) Timo Lahti	8
12	(Finland) Antti Vuolas	6
13	(Denmark) Frederik Jakobsen	5
14	(Sweden) Jacob Thorssell	4
15	(Hungary) Norbert Magosi	1
16	(Hungary) Márk Bárány	0
17	(Hungary) Roland Kovacs	0

=== Qualified riders ===
#	Riders	2022 place	SEC Ch place	Appearance
30	(Denmark) Leon Madsen	1		8th
333	(Poland) Janusz Kołodziej	2		5th
155	(Denmark) Mikkel Michelsen	3		6th
692	(Poland) Patryk Dudek	4		4rd
415	(Poland) Dominik Kubera	5		2nd
96	(France) Dimitri Bergé	13	1	2nd
223	(Poland) Kacper Woryna	14	2	4th
201	(Czech Republic) Jan Kvěch	18	3	1st
29	(Poland) Grzegorz Zengota		4	1st
114	(Denmark) Andreas Lyager		5	1st
85	(Sweden) Antonio Lindbäck		6	5th
129	(Latvia) Andžejs Ļebedevs	11	10	7th
225	(Czech Republic) Václav Milík	15		9th
744	(Germany) Kai Huckenbeck	16		6th
299	(United Kingdom) Adam Ellis	17		2nd

=== Championship Series ===
The 2023 series will be staged over four rounds.

Round	Date	Venue	Winner
1	17 June	(Poland) Arena Częstochowa, Częstochowa	(Denmark) Leon Madsen
2	5 August	(Germany) Stadion Güstrow, Güstrow	(Poland) Janusz Kołodziej
3	9 September	(Poland) Polonia Bydgoszcz Stadium, Bydgoszcz	(Denmark) Leon Madsen
4	22 September	(Czech Republic) Svítkov Stadium, Pardubice	(Poland) Janusz Kołodziej

== Final Classification ==
Pos.	Rider	Points	(Poland)	(Germany)	(Poland)	(Czech Republic)
1	(Denmark) (155) Mikkel Michelsen	52	15	14	14	9
2	(Denmark) (30) Leon Madsen	44	16	4	15	9
3	(Poland) (333) Janusz Kołodziej	42	–	17	14	11
4	(Poland) (692) Patryk Dudek	33	8	10	9	6
5	(Latvia) (129) Andžejs Ļebedevs	33	8	11	9	5
6	(Poland) (415) Dominik Kubera	30	–	10	10	10
7	(Germany) (744) Kai Huckenbeck	30	6	7	10	7
8	(Poland) (223) Kacper Woryna	27	11	8	6	2
9	(France) (96) Dimitri Bergé	24	10	5	5	4
10	(Sweden) (85) Antonio Lindbäck	25	2	9	9	5
11	(United Kingdom) (299) Adam Ellis	22	5	7	6	4
12	(Denmark) (114) Andreas Lyager	20	–	5	8	7
13	(Poland) (48) Szymon Woźniak	18	12	–	6	–
14	(Czech Republic) (201) Jan Kvěch	13	7	3	1	2
15	(Denmark) (88) Niels-Kristian Iversen	9	9	–	–	–
16	(Poland) (16) Maksym Drabik	9	9	–	–	–
17	(Poland) (29) Grzegorz Zengota	9	–	7	2	–
18	(Czech Republic) (225) Václav Milík	9	3	5	1	–
19	(Finland) (98) Timo Lahti	5	5	–	–	–
20	(Germany) (16) Norick Blödorn	3	–	3	–	–
21	(Czech Republic) (16) Petr Chlupáč	1	–	–	–	1
22	(Poland) (16) Kacper Pludra	1	–	–	1	–
23	(Poland) (17) Kacper Halkiewicz	0	0	–	–	–

== See also ==
- 2023 Speedway Grand Prix
