= Gislaved Motorbana =

Stadium in Gislaved, Sweden

- Location: Reftelevägen 61, 332 36 Gislaved, Sweden
- Coordinates: 57°16′49″N 13°32′54″E
- Capacity: 10,000
- Operator: Lejonen motorcycle speedway
- Opened: 10 July 1932
- Length: 0.368 km (0.229 mi)

Gislaved Motorbana or the OnePartnerGroup Arena (for sponsorship purposes) is a motorcycle speedway track in the southern outskirts of Gislaved. The track is located on the Reftelevägen 61 and surrounded by the Skogsmusen Solpark (a forest and hiking area).

The stadium hosts the Lejonen speedway team that compete in the Swedish Speedway Team Championship and have been champions of Sweden on two occasions.

== History ==
The track was constructed in 1931 and opened on 10 July 1932, it is the oldest speedway tack in Sweden. Four years later in 1936, the track width was increased from 6 metres to 10 metres. The record attendance of 12,247 was set on 10 August 1947.

The speedway track hosted the Nordic Speedway Final in 1961. During the 1980s, the track increased in size to 380 metres. and hosted the Scandinavian round of the 1983 Speedway World Team Cup.

In 2007, the track decreased in size to 374 metres and one year later in 2008, the stadium became known as the Axelent Arena (for sponsorship purposes) It later became the OnePartnerGroup Arena (also for sponsorship purposes).

In 2017, the track was changed to 368 metres and on 8 July 2021, Robert Lambert set a new track record of 62.5 seconds for the 368m distance.

Most recently, the stadium hosted an SGP2 Qualification event in 2022 and then the Final of the 2023 FIM Speedway Grand Prix Qualifiers, the Grand Prix Challenge, to decide qualifiers for the 2024 Speedway Grand Prix Series.

On 11 June 2024, Robert Lambert lowered his own track record to 62.2 seconds.

In June 2027, the stadium is scheduled to host the SEC Challenge.
