= 2026 Speedway World Cup =

60th edition of the annual motorcycle speedway World Cup competition

Speedway World Cup
- Venue: Stadion Narodowy
- Location: Warsaw, Poland
- Start date: 1 May
- End date: 29 August
- Nations: 10
- Website: https://www.fimspeedway.com/swc

Medalists
gold medal	Australia
silver medal	Denmark
bronze medal	Poland

The 2026 FIM Speedway World Cup (SWC) was the 19th Speedway World Cup, an international motorcycle speedway world championship tournament organised by the FIM. The 2026 edition was the first since 2023 and took place between 1 May and 29 August 2026. Poland were the defending champions having won the competition in 2023.

The competition involved ten national teams, with four competing in the first semi-final at Landshut in Germany on 1 May and four competing in the second semi-final at Riga in Latvia on 7 August. The winners of the semi-finals joined hosts Poland and Speedway of Nations champions Australia in the final at Warsaw in Poland on 29 August. Russia were once again excluded from an FIM event due to the ongoing war in Ukraine.

Great Britain won the first semi-final, beating Czechia, Germany and Ukraine to reach the final. Grand Prix stars Robert Lambert and Dan Bewley shone, scoring 27 points between them.

Australia won the World Cup after dominating the final. The Aussies scored 38 points, with Brady Kurtz top scoring for his country. Denmark were runners-up, with hosts Poland completing the podium.

== Semi final 1 ==
- Ellermühle Speedway Stadium, Landshut, Germany
- 1 May 2026

Pos.	National team	Pts.	Scorers
1	Great Britain	39	Robert Lambert 14 (C), Dan Bewley 13, Tom Brennan 9, Leon Flint 3, Will Cairns DNR
2	Czech Republic	30	Václav Milík 12, Jan Kvěch 10 (C), Daniel Klíma 5, Adam Bednář 3, Adam Nejezchleba DNR
3	Germany	30	Kai Huckenbeck 12 (C), Norick Blödorn 11, Kevin Wölbert 5, Lars Skupień 2, Mario Häusl 0
4	Ukraine	21	Stanislav Melnychuk 11, Nazar Parnitskyi 4, Marko Levishyn 4 (C), Roman Kapustin 2, Andriy Rozaliuk 0

== Semi final 2 ==
- Biķernieki Speedway Stadium, Riga, Latvia
- 7 August 2026

Pos.	National team	Pts.	Scorers
1	Denmark	40	Leon Madsen 14, Mikkel Michelsen 10, Michael Jepsen Jensen (C) 9, Frederik Jakobsen 4, Anders Thomsen 3
2	Latvia	32	Andžejs Ļebedevs (C) 14, Daniils Kolodinskis 8, Jevgeņijs Kostigovs 4, Francis Gusts 4, Oļegs Mihailovs 2
3	Sweden	32	Kim Nilsson 11, Jacob Thorssell 9, Fredrik Lindgren (C) 6, Timo Lahti 6, Oliver Berntzon DNR,
4	Norway	15	Mathias Pollestad 6, Lasse Fredriksen 4, Glenn Moi 3, Truls Kamhaug (C) 2, Magnus Klipper DNR

== Final ==
- Stadion Narodowy, Warsaw, Poland
- 29 August 2026

Pos.	National team	Pts.	Scorers
1	Australia	38	Brady Kurtz (C) 11, Ryan Douglas 10, Jason Doyle 10, Max Fricke 7, Rohan Tungate DNR
2	Denmark	30	Mikkel Michelsen 12, Anders Thomsen 8, Leon Madsen 5, Michael Jepsen Jensen (C) 5, Frederik Jakobsen 0
3	Poland	29	Bartosz Zmarzlik (C) 11, Kacper Woryna 9, Patryk Dudek 5, Maciej Janowski 2, Dominik Kubera 2
4	Great Britain	23	Robert Lambert (C) 14, Charles Wright 5, Adam Ellis 3, Leon Flint 1, Tom Brennan DNR

== Final classification ==
Pos.	National team	Pts.
Gold	Australia	38
Silver	Denmark	30
Bronze	Poland	29
4	Great Britain	23
5	Latvia	32
6	Czech Republic	30
7	Sweden	32
8	Germany	30
9	Ukraine	21
10	Norway	15
