= Speedway Center Mureck =

Motorcycle speedway track in Mureck, Austria

- Location: Austraße 15, 8480 Mureck, Austria
- Coordinates: 46°42′12″N 15°46′16″E
- Operator: Motorcycle speedway

The Speedway Center Mureck is a motorcycle speedway venue in the southern outskirts of Mureck, Austria. It is located on the north bank of the River Mur, off the Austraße road and adjacent to the Mureck Adventure Pool.

The center was the venue for qualifying rounds of the 2023 Speedway European Championship and 2024 Speedway European Championship.
