= 2024 Speedway Grand Prix =

30th season of Speedway Grand Pix

Season details
- Dates: 27 April – 28 September
- Events: 11
- Cities: 11
- Countries: 8
- Riders: 15 permanents 1 wild card(s); 2 track reserves
- Heats: 253 (in 11 events)

Winners
- Champion: POL Bartosz Zmarzlik
- Runner-up: GBR Robert Lambert
- 3rd place: SWE Fredrik Lindgren

The 2024 Speedway Grand Prix season was the 30th season of the Speedway Grand Prix era, and decided the 79th FIM Speedway World Championship. It was the third series promoted by Discovery Sports Events. A new sprint race was introduced at selected Grand Prix during the qualifying session, with the fastest rider in each qualifying session progressing to a single race for extra points. The idea behind the sprint race was similar to that brought into the Formula One, whereby the qualifying sessions were given more importance.

Bartosz Zmarzlik successfully defended the title, which was his third in a row and a fifth overall. Robert Lambert took second place with Fredrik Lindgren in third.

== Summary ==
Jack Holder won the opening round, which was the first Grand Prix win of his career. After Jason Doyle won round two, Mikkel Michelsen won his maiden Grand Prix by claiming the German Grand Prix. Doyle was later ruled out for four months after suffering a torn rotator cuff and tendon damage after a crash at Ipswich, ending his hopes of a second world title.

By winning the 2024 Speedway Grand Prix of Sweden, Zmarzlik broke Jason Crump's all-time record of 23 Grand Prix wins, although ten of them were won on home soil, whereas Crump's were all outside of Australia.

== Qualification ==
For the 2024 season there were 15 permanent riders, who were joined at each Grand Prix by one wild card and two track reserves. The top six riders from the 2023 championship qualified automatically. These riders were joined by the three riders who qualified via the Grand Prix Challenge and the 2023 Speedway European Championship winner. The final five riders were nominated by the SGP Commission.

=== Qualified riders ===
#	Riders	2023 place	GP Ch place	Permanent rider appearance	Previous appearances in series
95	(Poland) Bartosz Zmarzlik	1	—	9th	2012–2015, 2016–2023
66	(Sweden) Fredrik Lindgren	2	—	15th	2004, 2006–2007, 2008–2014, 2016, 2017–2023
54	(Slovakia) Martin Vaculík	3	2	9th	2012, 2013, 2017–2023
25	(Australia) Jack Holder	4	—	3rd	2016, 2020, 2022–2023
30	(Denmark) Leon Madsen	5	—	6th	2010, 2013, 2019–2023
505	(United Kingdom) Robert Lambert	6	4	4th	2015, 2018–2019, 2021–2023
99	(United Kingdom) Dan Bewley	7	—	3rd	2018, 2022–2023
69	(Australia) Jason Doyle	8	1	10th	2015–2023
108	(United Kingdom) Tai Woffinden	11	—	13th	2010, 2011, 2013–2023
155	(Denmark) Mikkel Michelsen	12	—	4th	2015, 2018–2019, 2020, 2021, 2022–2023
29	(Latvia) Andžejs Ļebedevs	16	7	1st	2013–2014, 2022–2023
744	(Germany) Kai Huckenbeck	17	—	1st	2017–2019, 2022–2023
415	(Poland) Dominik Kubera	=21	—	1st	2021, 2023
48	(Poland) Szymon Woźniak	=26	3	1st	2018, 2022–2023
201	(Czech Republic) Jan Kvěch	=31	5	1st	2020–2023

=== Qualified substitutes ===
The following riders were nominated as substitutes:

#	Riders	2023 place	GP Ch place
46	(Australia) Max Fricke	9	—
71	(Poland) Maciej Janowski	14	—
233	(Sweden) Kim Nilsson	13	—
67	(Denmark) Rasmus Jensen	=19	—
22	(United States) Luke Becker	=24	8
96	(France) Dimitri Bergé	—	10
842	(Poland) Mateusz Cierniak	—	—

== Calendar ==
The 2024 season consisted of 11 events.

Round	Date	City and venue	Winner	Runner-up	3rd placed	4th placed	Results
1	27 April	(Croatia) Donji Kraljevec, Croatia; Stadium Milenium	(Australia) Jack Holder	(Australia) Jason Doyle	(Sweden) Fredrik Lindgren	(Poland) Bartosz Zmarzlik	results
2	11 May	(Poland) Warsaw, Poland; Stadion Narodowy	(Australia) Jason Doyle	(Poland) Bartosz Zmarzlik	(United Kingdom) Robert Lambert	(Slovakia) Martin Vaculík	results
3	18 May	(Germany) Landshut, Germany; Ellermühle Speedway Stadium	(Denmark) Mikkel Michelsen	(Poland) Bartosz Zmarzlik	(Australia) Jack Holder	(Poland) Dominik Kubera	results
4	1 June	(Czech Republic) Prague, Czech Republic; Markéta Stadium	(Slovakia) Martin Vaculík	(Sweden) Fredrik Lindgren	(Poland) Bartosz Zmarzlik	(Poland) Dominik Kubera	results
5	15 June	(Sweden) Målilla, Sweden; Skrotfrag Arena	(Poland) Bartosz Zmarzlik	(Australia) Max Fricke	(United Kingdom) Robert Lambert	(Australia) Jack Holder	results
6	29 June	Gorzów, Poland; Edward Jancarz Stadium	(Sweden) Fredrik Lindgren	(Poland) Bartosz Zmarzlik	(Denmark) Mikkel Michelsen	(Denmark) Leon Madsen	results
7	17 August	(United Kingdom) Cardiff, Great Britain; Principality Stadium	(United Kingdom) Dan Bewley	(United Kingdom) Robert Lambert	(Sweden) Fredrik Lindgren	(Poland) Dominik Kubera	results
8	31 August	Wrocław, Poland; Olympic Stadium	(Slovakia) Martin Vaculík	(Sweden) Fredrik Lindgren	(United Kingdom) Robert Lambert	(Denmark) Mikkel Michelsen	results
9	7 September	(Latvia) Riga, Latvia; Riga Speedway Stadium	(Poland) Bartosz Zmarzlik	(Sweden) Fredrik Lindgren	(United Kingdom) Dan Bewley	(Australia) Max Fricke	results
10	14 September	(Denmark) Vojens, Denmark; Vojens Speedway Center	(United Kingdom) Robert Lambert	(Poland) Bartosz Zmarzlik	(Poland) Maciej Janowski	(Latvia) Andžejs Ļebedevs	results
11	28 September	Toruń, Poland; MotoArena Toruń	(Poland) Bartosz Zmarzlik	(Denmark) Leon Madsen	(United Kingdom) Dan Bewley	(Sweden) Fredrik Lindgren	results

== Final classification ==
Qualifies for next season's Grand Prix series
Full-time Grand Prix rider
Wild card, track reserve or qualified reserve

Pos.	Rider	Points	CRO (Croatia)	POL (Poland)	GER (Germany)	CZE (Czech Republic)	SWE (Sweden)	PL2 (Poland)	GBR (United Kingdom)	PL3 (Poland)	LAT (Latvia)	DEN (Denmark)	PL4 (Poland)
Gold	(Poland) (95) Bartosz Zmarzlik (C)	179	14	18	18	16	20	18	7	10	20	18	20
Silver	(United Kingdom) (505) Robert Lambert	144	12	17	12	12	16	3	18	16	11	20	7
Bronze	(Sweden) (66) Fredrik Lindgren	141	16	7	3	18	8	20	16	18	18	3	14
4	(United Kingdom) (99) Dan Bewley	127	3	15	10	5	9	7	24	11	16	11	16
5	(Slovakia) (54) Martin Vaculík	122	7	14	6	20	6	12	10	20	7	12	8
6	(Australia) (25) Jack Holder	106	20	12	16	6	14	9	10	6	2	2	9
7	(Denmark) (155) Mikkel Michelsen	101	8	8	20	11	12	16	12	14	0	–	–
8	(Poland) (415) Dominik Kubera	98	9	2	14	14	11	4	14	5	5	10	10
9	(Denmark) (30) Leon Madsen	94	10	4	11	7	5	14	9	7	9	–	18
10	(Latvia) (29) Andžejs Ļebedevs	79	4	5	4	9	10	–	11	8	10	14	4
11	(Australia) (46) Max Fricke	69	–	–	–	10	18	5	5	4	14	8	5
12	(Germany) (744) Kai Huckenbeck	61	11	9	5	2	3	11	2	3	8	4	3
13	(Poland) (48) Szymon Woźniak	58	6	10	8	8	7	10	1	1	4	1	2
14	(Poland) (71) Maciej Janowski	52	–	–	–	–	–	1	8	9	12	16	6
15	(Czech Republic) (201) Jan Kvěch	52	5	4	1	3	2	8	5	2	6	5	11
16	(Australia) (69) Jason Doyle	47	18	20	9	–	–	–	–	–	–	–	–
17	(Poland) (16) Patryk Dudek	24	–	–	–	–	–	–	–	12	–	–	12
18	(United Kingdom) (108) Tai Woffinden	23	1	8	7	1	4	2	–	–	–	–	–
19	(Denmark) (67) Rasmus Jensen	9	–	–	–	–	–	–	–	–	–	9	–
20	(Sweden) (233) Kim Nilsson	8	–	–	–	–	1	–	–	–	–	6	1
21	(Denmark) (16) Anders Thomsen	7	–	–	–	–	–	–	–	–	–	7	–
22	(Poland) (16) Oskar Fajfer	6	–	–	–	–	–	6	–	–	–	–	–
23	(Czech Republic) (16) Václav Milík	4	–	–	–	4	–	–	–	–	–	–	–
24	(United Kingdom) (16) Tom Brennan	4	–	–	–	–	–	–	4	–	–	–	–
25	(Poland) (16) Mateusz Cierniak	3	–	3	–	–	–	–	–	–	–	–	–
26	(Latvia) (16) Daniils Kolodinskis	3	–	–	–	–	–	–	–	–	3	–	–
27	(Slovenia) (16) Matej Žagar	2	2	–	–	–	–	–	–	–	–	–	–
28	(Germany) (16) Norick Blödorn	2	–	–	2	–	–	–	–	–	–	–	–
29	(Latvia) (17) Francis Gusts	1	–	–	–	–	–	–	–	–	1	–	–
30	(Poland) (17) Bartłomiej Kowalski	0	–	0	–	–	–	–	–	–	–	–	–
31	(Germany) (17) Martin Smolinski	0	–	–	0	–	–	–	–	–	–	–	–
32	(Germany) (18) Erik Riss	0	–	–	0	–	–	–	–	–	–	–	–
33	(Poland) (17) Jakub Miśkowiak	0	–	–	–	–	–	0	–	–	–	–	–
34	(Poland) (18) Oskar Paluch	0	–	–	–	–	–	0	–	–	–	–	–
35	(Latvia) (18) Ričards Ansviesulis	0	–	–	–	–	–	–	–	–	0	–	–
Pos.	Rider	Points	CRO (Croatia)	POL (Poland)	GER (Germany)	CZE (Czech Republic)	SWE (Sweden)	PL2 (Poland)	GBR (United Kingdom)	PL3 (Poland)	LAT (Latvia)	DEN (Denmark)	PL4 (Poland)
