= Gislaved =

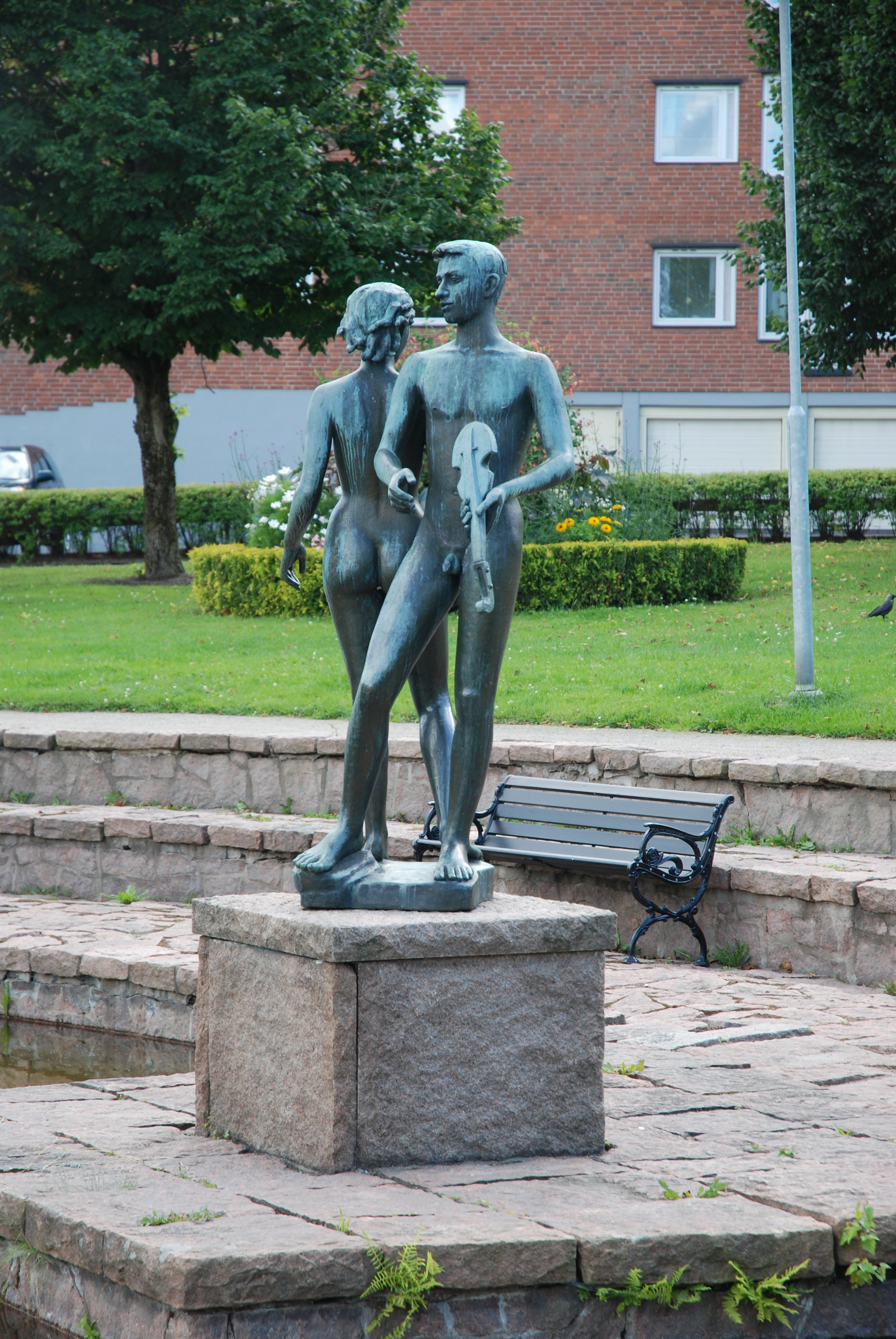
- Folkvisan by Axel Wallenberg

- Location within Jönköping Location within Sweden
- Coordinates: 57°18′N 13°32′E
- Country: Sweden
- Province: Småland
- County: Jönköping County
- Municipality: Gislaved Municipality

Area
  - Total: 6.97 km^{2} (2.69 sq mi)

Population (31 December 2020)
  - Total: 10,269
  - Density: 1,474/km^{2} (3,820/sq mi)
- Time zone: UTC+1 (CET)
  - Summer (DST): UTC+2 (CEST)
- Postal code: 33230, 33231, 33232, 33233, 33234, 33235, 33236, 33237, 33238
- Climate: Dfb

Gislaved (Swedish pronunciation: [ˈjɪ̂sːlaˌveːd]) is the seat and most populous locality of Gislaved Municipality. With a population of 10,269 at the 2020 census, it is the 7th largest locality in Jönköping County.

== Sports ==
The following sports clubs are located in Gislaved:

- Gislaveds IS, football club based at the Ryttarvallen.
- Gislaveds VBK, volleyball club
- Lejonen, motorcycle speedway club, who are twice champions of Sweden and race at the Gislaved Motorbana.
