= Krzysztof Lewandowski =

Polish speedway rider (born 2005)

- Born: 20 January 2005 (age 21); Poland
- Nationality: Polish

Career history

Poland
- 2021–2025: Toruń

Individual honours
- 2023: Bronze Helmet

Krzysztof Lewandowski (born 20 January 2005) is an international speedway rider from Poland.

== Speedway career ==
Lewandowski came to prominence when he reached the final of the 2022 World U23 Championship finishing in 18th place and was selected for the Poland national under-21 speedway team for the 2023 season.

Lewandowski rode in both the 2021 Speedway Grand Prix and the 2022 Speedway Grand Prix as a track reserve at the Rose Motoarena in Toruń. During 2021 and 2022 he has ridden for KS Toruń in the Ekstraliga.
