= Arena Częstochowa =

Stadium in Częstochowa, Poland

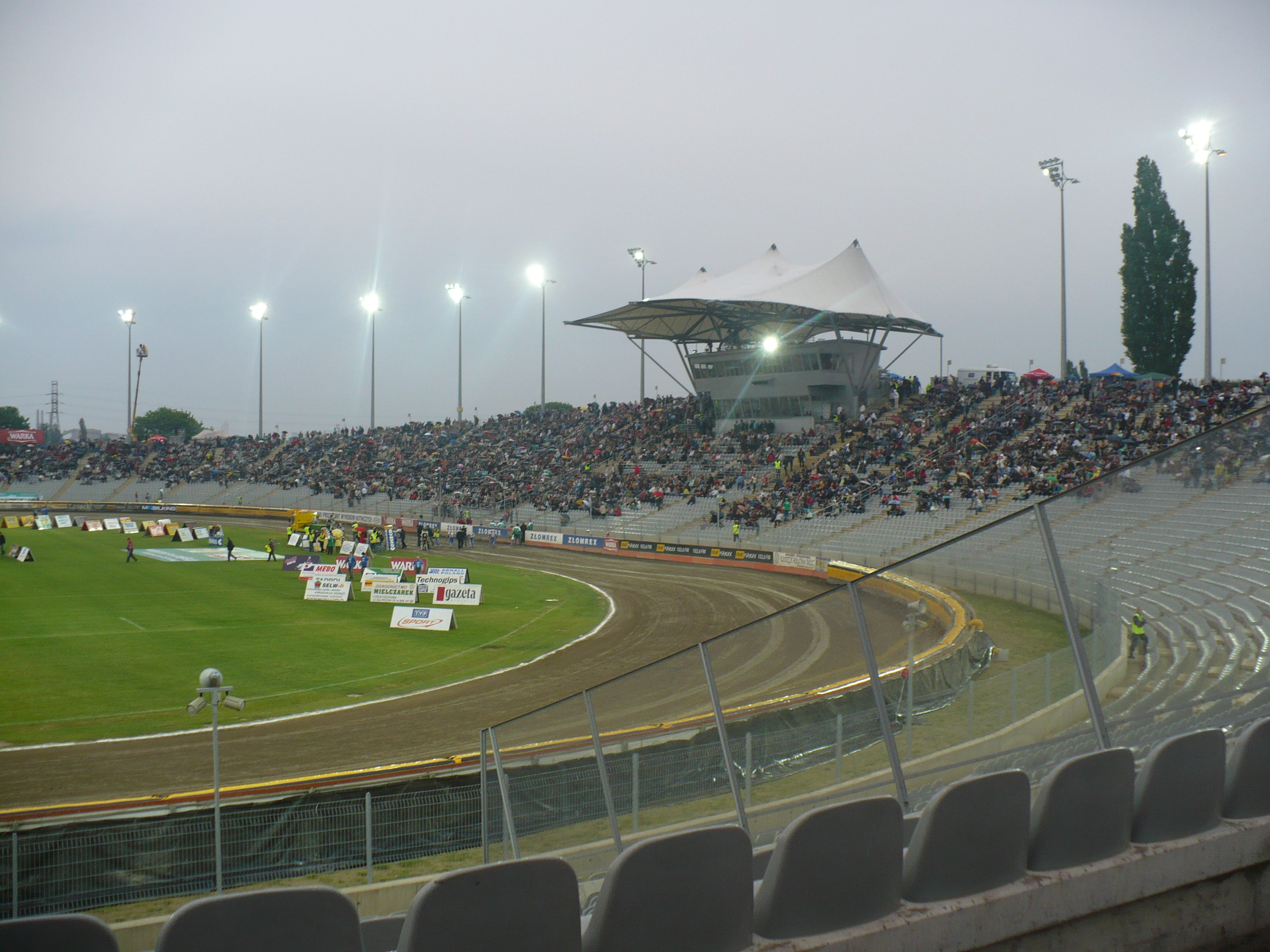
- Location: Olsztyńska 123, 42-202 Częstochowa, Poland
- Coordinates: 50°48′10″N 19°09′14″E
- Capacity: 16,850
- Opened: 1 September 1946
- Length: 0.359 km (0.223 mi)

The Arena Częstochowa also known as the Częstochowa Municipal Speedway Stadium is a 16,850-capacity motorcycle speedway stadium on the eastern outskirts of Częstochowa in Poland. The venue is used by the speedway team Włókniarz Częstochowa, who compete in the Team Speedway Polish Championship.

The venue was also used as a football stadium in previous years and hosted several important matches. It is also a venue for concerts.

== History ==
The first stadium design was created in 1928, but due to lack of funds and then the outbreak of World War II the actual construction of the stadium began once the war finished. The inaugural competition for the Częstochowa Championship was held on 1 September 1946.

The record attendance was set during the 1974 Polish speedway season, when 35,000 spectators attended the speedway match between Włókniarz Częstochowa and Falubaz Zielona Góra. The stadium and the speedway track were rebuilt at various times, with the largest reconstruction taking place in 2005. On 1 February 2007, the management of the stadium was taken over from the CKM Włókniarz club by the Municipal Sports and Recreation Center in Częstochowa but this reversed in October 2012.

Until 2007, the stadium was called the Municipal Speedway Stadium. The name Arena Częstochowa was given by the resolution of the Częstochowa city council on 23 April 2007. In 2013, the naming rights were sold to Sorting Group Poland (SGP), following a sponsorship agreement and the stadium was known as the SGP Arena and in 2020, it was known as the Arena Zielona-energia.com for sponsorship purposes.

On 7 September 2022, the track record was broken by Jakub Miśkowiak who recorded 61.69 seconds for the four laps.
