= Kacper Woryna =

Polish Speedway rider (born 1996)

- Born: 31 August 1996 (age 30); Rybnik, Poland
- Nationality: Polish

Career history

Poland
- 2012–2020: ROW Rybnik
- 2021–2025: Częstochowa
- 2026: Lublin

Great Britain
- 2016: Coventry
- 2018: Poole

Sweden
- 2021–2023: Smederna
- 2018-2020, 2024–2026: Lejonen

Denmark
- 2017: Fjelsted
- 2024: Region Varde

Speedway Grand Prix statistics
- SGP number: 223
- Starts: 12
- Finalist: 2 times
- Winner: 1 times

Individual honours
- 2026: Golden Helmet winner

Team honours
- 2018: British champion
- 2022, 2024: Elitserien champion

Kacper Woryna (born 31 August 1996) is a Polish Speedway rider.

== Career ==
Born in Rybnik, Woryna began racing in native Poland in the Ekstraliga with his hometown club, Rybnik. After a few years of riding in Poland, Woryna got his first break into British Speedway, riding with the Coventry Bees during the 2016 Elite League season, who beat off competition from his grandfather's former club, the Poole Pirates, to secure his signature. Woryna was recommended to the Bees management by club captain and Speedway Grand Prix rider Chris Harris, and was also given a big thumbs up by another of his new Coventry teammates, former world number 2 Krzysztof Kasprzak.

The following season, Woryna joined Poole and helped the team win the SGB Premiership 2018.

In 2022, Woryna helped Smederna win the Swedish Speedway Team Championship during the 2022 campaign, and two years later, he helped Lejonen win the Elitserien during the 2024 Swedish speedway season.

== Family ==
Woryna comes from a racing family. His late grandfather, Antoni Woryna, rode for the Poole Pirates in the UK and came third in the Speedway World Championship on two occasions, first in 1966 and later in 1970.

== Major results ==
=== World individual Championship ===
- 2016 Speedway Grand Prix – 34th (1 pt)
- 2022 Speedway Grand Prix – 19th (8 pts)
- 2026 Speedway Grand Prix – 8th (95 pts)

=== Grand Prix wins ===
- 1: 2026 Speedway Grand Prix of Germany

=== World team Championships ===
- 2026 Speedway World Cup – 3rd
