= Mikkel Michelsen =

Danish speedway rider

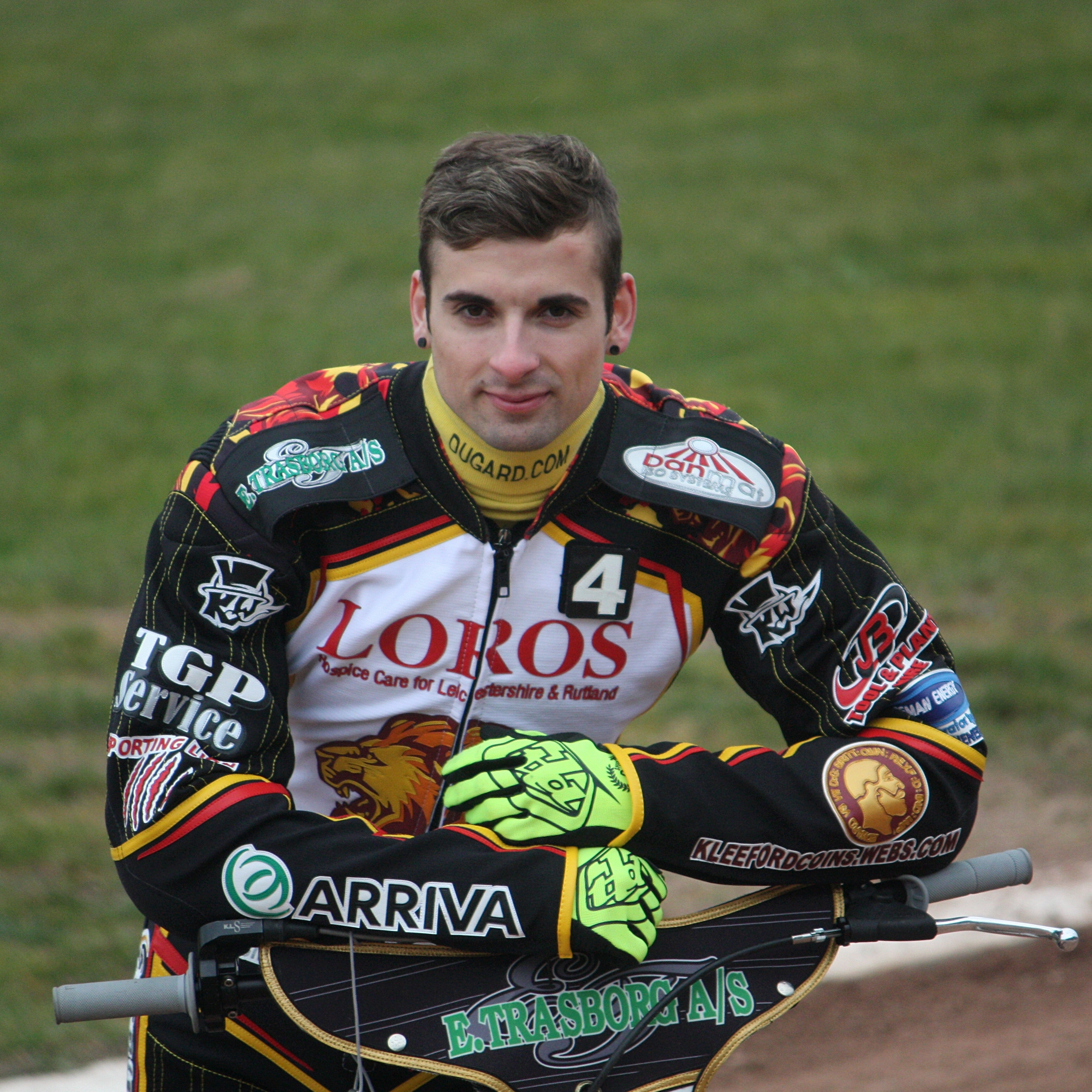
- Born: 19 August 1994 (age 32); Nykøbing Falster, Denmark
- Nationality: Danish
- Website: Official website

Career history

Denmark
- 2008–2026: Slangerup

Poland
- 2013–2014: Leszno
- 2015: Ostrów
- 2016–2017: Tarnów
- 2018: Gdańsk
- 2019–2022: Lublin
- 2023–2024: Częstochowa
- 2025–2026: Toruń

Great Britain
- 2013–2014: Eastbourne
- 2015: Leicester

Sweden
- 2013: Dackarna
- 2014–2018: Smederna
- 2019: Piraterna
- 2023: Västervik
- 2026: Rospiggarna

Speedway Grand Prix statistics
- SGP number: 155
- Starts: 52
- Finalist: 5 times
- Winner: 1 times

Individual honours
- 2019, 2021, 2023: European Champion
- 2023: Danish Champion
- 2013: European Junior Champion
- 2013: Danish Junior Champion
- 2008, 2009: Junior World Cup

Team honours
- 2013: Under-21 World Cup
- 2017, 2018: Swedish league champion
- 2024, 2025: Danish league champion
- 2025, 2026: Polish champion

Mikkel Michelsen (born 19 August 1994) is a Danish speedway rider.

== Career ==
Born in Nykøbing Falster, Michelsen took up speedway at the age of six, and went on to win the Junior World Cup in both 2008 and 2009.

Michelsen rode for Slangerup Speedway Klub in the Danish league from 2010. After racing in Germany for AC Landshut Devils in 2012, he rode in Poland and the United Kingdom in 2013 for Unia Leszno and Eastbourne Eagles respectively, staying with both teams in 2014.

In 2013, Michelsen won the Danish Under 21 Individual Speedway Championship, the European Junior Championship, and the Under-21 World Cup with Denmark.

In 2014, Michelsen was a reserve in the Danish Speedway Grand Prix and finished third in the World Under-21 Championship after also reaching the final in 2011 and 2013.

In December 2014, with the Eagles dropping to the National League, he signed for Leicester Lions for the 2015 Elite League season, and also signed to ride for Ostrów in the Polish league.

In 2022, Michelsen finished in 11th place during the 2022 Speedway World Championship, after securing 82 points during the 2022 Speedway Grand Prix and was selected as a full time rider for the 2023 Speedway Grand Prix. Also in 2022, he helped Lublin win the 2022 Ekstraliga.

During the 2023 Danish speedway season, Michelsen became the Danish champion for the first time and won the 2023 Speedway European Championship to become the European champion for the third time. He was also part of the Danish team that won the bronze medal in the 2023 Speedway World Cup final. His European win earned him a place in the 2024 Speedway Grand Prix.

In 2024, Michelsen won his maiden Grand Prix after winning the Speedway Grand Prix of Germany. Also in 2024, he helped Denmark reach the final of the 2024 Speedway of Nations in Manchester. His 2024 season ended badly after a crash with Bartosz Zmarzlik at the Latvian Grand Prix, where he sustained significant injuries to his right shoulder, humerus and elbow. Some consolation was received because he had helped Slangerup win the Danish Speedway League during the 2024 Danish speedway season.

In 2025, Michelsen finished ninth in the World Championship, and during the 2025 Danish speedway season, he helped Slangerup retain the Speedway Ligaen title.

== Major results ==
=== World individual Championship ===
- 2015 Speedway Grand Prix – 21st
- 2018 Speedway Grand Prix – 29th
- 2019 Speedway Grand Prix – 17th
- 2020 Speedway Grand Prix – 14th
- 2021 Speedway Grand Prix – 18th
- 2022 Speedway Grand Prix – 11th
- 2023 Speedway Grand Prix – 12th
- 2024 Speedway Grand Prix – 7th
- 2025 Speedway Grand Prix – 9th

=== Grand Prix wins ===
- 1: 2024 Speedway Grand Prix of Germany

=== World team Championships ===
- 2021 Speedway of Nations – 3rd
- 2022 Speedway of Nations – 4th
- 2023 Speedway World Cup – 3rd
- 2024 Speedway of Nations – 6th
- 2025 Speedway of Nations – 3rd
- 2026 Speedway World Cup – 2nd
