= Szymon Woźniak =

Polish speedway rider

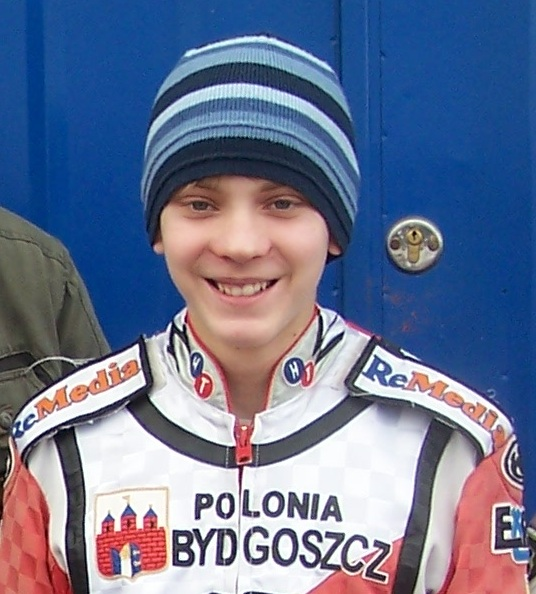
- Born: 6 May 1993 (age 33); Tuchola, Poland
- Nationality: Polish
- Website: Official website

Career history

Poland
- 2008–2015, 2025: Bydgoszcz
- 2016–2017: Wrocław
- 2018–2024: Gorzów

Sweden
- 2015, 2022: Rospiggarna
- 2016: Piraterna
- 2017–2021: Vetlanda
- 2023–2025: Indianerna

Great Britain
- 2015–2016: Leicester

Denmark
- 2012: Outrup
- 2013–2014: Grindsted

Speedway Grand Prix statistics
- SGP number: 48
- Starts: 14
- Finalist: 0 times
- Winner: 0 times

Individual honours
- 2014: Polish Under-21 Champion
- 2017: Polish Champion

Team honours
- 2023: European Team champion
- 2023: European Pairs champion

Szymon Woźniak (born 6 May 1993) is a Polish speedway rider.

== Career ==
Woźniak rode for his hometown club, Polonia Bydgoszcz in the Speedway Ekstraliga up to 2015 before moving to Sparta Wrocław for the 2016 season. He rode for the Poland U-21 national team and won the Polish Under-21 Championship in 2014. He was part of the Leicester Lions team in the British Elite League in 2015 and 2016.

In 2017, Woźniak won the Polish Championship, beating Przemyslaw Pawlicki, Patryk Dudek, and Jaroslaw Hampel in the final.

In 2023, Woźniak was a member of the Polish team that won the European Team Speedway Championship and paired up with Przemysław Pawlicki to become the European Pairs champion. However, arguably his best result was finishing third in the Grand Prix Challenge, which sealed a place in the 2024 Speedway Grand Prix.

== Personal life ==
Woźniak has one older brother. His family is unrelated to Jacek Woźniak, a Polonia Bydgoszcz coach.

== Major results ==
=== World individual Championship ===
- 2023 Speedway Grand Prix - = 26th
- 2024 Speedway Grand Prix - = 13th

=== World Junior Championships ===
- Team U-21 World Championship
  - 2010 - (England) Rye House - 3rd

=== Domestic competitions ===
- Polish Under-21 Championship
  - 2014 - Gorzow - 1st place (14 pts)
- Polish Championship
  - 2017 - Gorzow - 1st place

== See also ==
- Speedway in Poland
