= Dominik Kubera =

Polish speedway rider

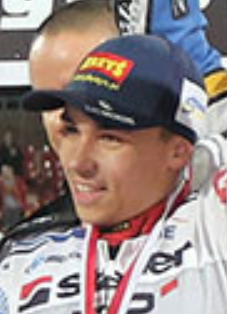
- Dominik Kubera in 2017
- Born: 15 April 1999 (age 27); Leszno, Poland
- Nationality: Polish

Career history

Poland
- 2015: Bydgoszcz
- 2015–2020: Leszno
- 2016: Kraków
- 2018–2019: Rawicz
- 2021–2025: Lublin
- 2026: Zielona Góra

Sweden
- 2019–2021: Vetlanda
- 2022–2026: Lejonen

Speedway Grand Prix statistics
- SGP number: 415
- Starts: 32
- Finalist: 6 times
- Winner: 0 times

Individual honours
- 2024: Golden Helmet
- 2020: World Under 21 Championship silver
- 2018: European Junior Champion

Team honours
- 2023: World team champion
- 2023: European Team champion
- 2015, 2017, 2018, 2019, 2020, 2022, 2023, 2024: Polish champion
- 2024: Swedish champions

Dominik Kubera (born 15 April 1999) is an international speedway rider from Poland.

== Speedway career ==
Kubera won a bronze and a silver medal at the World Under 21 Championship in 2019 and 2020 respectively. He had previously won the 2018 Individual Speedway Junior European Championship.

During the 2021 Speedway Grand Prix, Kubera won silver and bronze medals in the fifth and sixth rounds of the World Championship. In 2022, he helped Lublin win the 2022 Ekstraliga.

In 2023, Kubera was a member of the Polish team that won the European Team Speedway Championship. In July 2023, he was part of the Polish team that won the gold medal in the 2023 Speedway World Cup final. Later in 2023, he received a permanent wildcard slot for the 2024 Speedway Grand Prix.

Kubera started the 2024 season in style by winning the Golden Helmet. Also in 2024, he helped Poland reach the final of the 2024 Speedway of Nations in Manchester. Kubera ended his 2024 season by qualifying for the 2025 Speedway Grand Prix by finishing third in the 2025 GP Challenge. In 2024, he helped Lejonen win the Elitserien during the 2024 Swedish speedway season and helped Lublin win the Ekstraliga during the 2024 Polish speedway season. In 2025, he finished 12th in the World Championship.

== Major results ==
=== World individual Championship ===
- 2021 Speedway Grand Prix – 14th (44 pts)
- 2023 Speedway Grand Prix – 21st (4 pts)
- 2024 Speedway Grand Prix – 8th (98 pts)
- 2025 Speedway Grand Prix – 12th (61 pts)
- 2026 Speedway Grand Prix – 14th (44 pts)

=== World team Championships ===
- 2023 Speedway World Cup – Champion
- 2024 Speedway of Nations – 5th
- 2026 Speedway World Cup – 3rd
