= Robert Lambert (speedway rider) =

British speedway rider (born 1998)

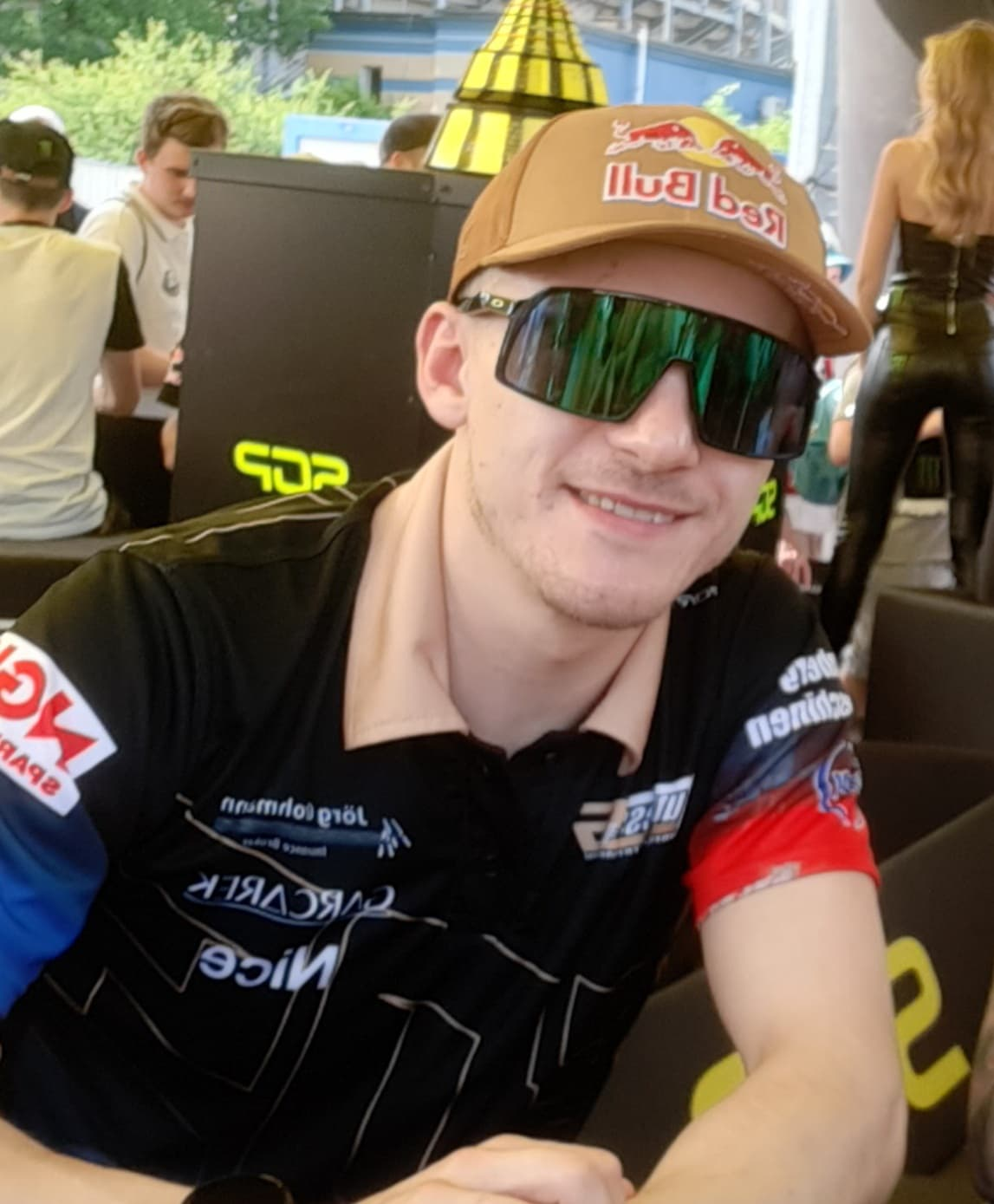
- Born: 5 April 1998 (age 28); Norwich, England
- Nationality: British (English)
- Website: Official website

Career history

Great Britain
- 2013–2019, 2023: King's Lynn
- 2015: Peterborough
- 2015: Rye House
- 2016–2017: Newcastle
- 2022: Belle Vue

Poland
- 2018–2019: Lublin
- 2020: Rybnik
- 2021–2026: Toruń

Sweden
- 2016: Masarna
- 2018: Rospiggarna
- 2020–2021: Lejonen
- 2022–2023: Smederna
- 2024–2026: Västervik

Denmark
- 2014: Outrup
- 2018: Grindsted

Speedway Grand Prix statistics
- SGP number: 505
- Starts: 72
- Finalist: 16 times
- Winner: 4 times

Individual honours
- 2026: World Champion
- 2020: SEC Champion
- 2018, 2025, 2026: British Champion
- 2017: European Junior Champion
- 2017, 2018, 2019: British Under-21 Champion

Team honours
- 2021, 2024: World team champion
- 2022: British champions
- 2022, 2025: Swedish champions
- 2025, 2026: Polish champion

Robert Alan Lambert (born 5 April 1998) is a British motorcycle speedway rider and the winner of the 2026 World Championship.

== Career ==
Born in Norwich in 1998, the son of former Mildenhall Fen Tigers rider Paul Lambert, Robert Lambert rode motorbikes from the age of three, and competed in grasstrack as a junior starting at the age of six, going on to compete in junior speedway in 2008. He gained much of his early racing experience in Germany between 2012 and 2013, where he was allowed to race at a high level at a younger age (14) than in the UK. He rode in 2013 for King's Lynn Young Stars in the National League, scoring 15 points in his first meeting and winning five of his six races, and was promoted straight into main body of the Stars Elite League team the following year, with the team's early fixtures arranged to ensure that he reached the age of 16 before the first meeting. He impressed with a five ride paid maximum against Eastbourne Eagles in June. He also rode in Denmark for Outrup and in Germany for Berghaupton in 2014.

Starting with an assessed CMA of 3.00, by the end of the season this had risen to 5.32. He was signed for a second year by the Stars for 2015, and was also signed by Peterborough Panthers for their 2015 Premier League campaign.

Lambert was picked in the British team for the 2014 Under-21 World Cup.

In 2017, Lambert won the European Under-19 Cup and the European Individual Speedway Junior Championship. In 2020, Lambert became the first British rider to win the Speedway European Championship when the competition was held exclusively in Poland (over five rounds) due to the COVID-19 pandemic.

In 2021, Lambert became a world champion after Great Britain secured the 2021 Speedway of Nations (the world team title). In 2022, Lambert's good form continued and he finished in fifth place during the 2022 Speedway World Championship, after securing 103 points during the 2022 Speedway Grand Prix. The top six place finish automatically qualified him for the 2023 Speedway Grand Prix.

Towards the end of the 2022 season, Lambert returned to ride in the United Kingdom for Belle Vue Aces in the play offs, as a replacement for the injured Max Fricke. He top scored in the play off final and helped Belle Vue win the league title. He also helped Smederna win the Swedish Speedway Team Championship during the 2022 campaign.

In 2023, Lambert was part of the British team that won the silver medal in the 2023 Speedway World Cup final. Lambert was the leading rider on the night but just failed to hold off Maciej Janowski in the last heat, which would have forced a run-off. He returned to King's Lynn Stars for the latter part of the season following an injury crisis at the club. He finished the World Championship season with a sixth place finish and ensured his place in the 2024 Speedway Grand Prix.

He was signed for Sheffield Tigers as a replacement for the injured Tai Woffinden in the 2023 play offs in the UK, helping them to win the league after a famous victory over Ipswich.

Lambert starred again as he helped Great Britain secure the 2024 Speedway of Nations in Manchester, which was his second world team title, and then won his maiden Grand Prix in Vojens.

In 2025, Lambert won his second British Speedway Championship after securing victory at the 2025 British Speedway Championship. He finished seventh in the World Championship and helped Västervik win the Elitserien.

== Major results ==
=== World Individual Championship ===
- 2015 Speedway Grand Prix – 27th (1 pt)
- 2018 Speedway Grand Prix – 29th (1 pt)
- 2019 Speedway Grand Prix – 15th (39 pts)
- 2021 Speedway Grand Prix – 10th (82 pts)
- 2022 Speedway Grand Prix – 5th (103 pts)
- 2023 Speedway Grand Prix – 6th (108 pts)
- 2024 Speedway Grand Prix – 2nd (144 pts)
- 2025 Speedway Grand Prix – 7th (82 pts)
- 2026 Speedway Grand Prix – Champion (162 pts)

=== Grand Prix wins ===
- 1: 2024 Speedway Grand Prix of Denmark
- 2: 2026 Speedway Grand Prix of Poland (Łódź)
- 3: 2026 Speedway Grand Prix of Denmark
- 4: 2026 Speedway Grand Prix of Poland (Toruń)

=== World Team Championship ===
- 2017 Speedway World Cup - 5th
- 2016 Speedway World Cup - 2nd
- 2017 Speedway World Cup - 4th
- 2018 Speedway of Nations - 2nd
- 2019 Speedway of Nations - 7th
- 2020 Speedway of Nations - 6th
- 2021 Speedway of Nations - Champion
- 2022 Speedway of Nations - 2nd
- 2023 Speedway World Cup - 2nd
- 2024 Speedway of Nations - Champion
- 2025 Speedway of Nations - 5th
- 2026 Speedway World Cup - 4th
