= Andžejs Ļebedevs =

Latvian speedway rider

- Born: 4 November 1994 (age 32); Daugavpils, Latvia
- Nationality: Latvian

Career history

Sweden
- 2014–2015, 2020, 2022: Rospiggarna
- 2016–2019, 2021, 2026: Smederna
- 2023–2025: Dackarna

Poland
- 2011–2016, 2019: Daugavpils
- 2017–2018: Wrocław
- 2018, 2020: Rybnik
- 2021–2023: Krosno
- 2024: Leszno
- 2025: Gorzów
- 2026: Zielona Góra

Denmark
- 2016, 2023–2024: Fjelsted
- 2025–2026: SES

Speedway Grand Prix statistics
- SGP number: 29
- Starts: 42
- Finalist: 3 times
- Winner: 0 times

Individual honours
- 2017, 2024: European Champion
- 2013, 2019: Latvian Champion

Team honours
- 2017, 2018, 2019, 2023: Swedish Elitserien Champion

Andžejs Ļebedevs (born 4 November 1994) is a Latvian speedway rider.

== Career ==
Ļebedevs finished in 16th place during the 2022 Speedway World Championship, after securing 26 points during the 2022 Speedway Grand Prix. He was selected as a reserve for the 2023 Speedway Grand Prix. Also in 2022, he helped Wilki Krosno win the 2022 1.Liga.

Ļebedevs finished his 2023 Speedway Grand Prix World Championship season with five full appearances and finished in 16th place and later received a permanent wildcard slot for the 2024 Speedway Grand Prix.

In 2024, Ļebedevs helped Latvia reach the final of the 2024 Speedway of Nations in Manchester despite riding with three broken ribs. He also reached the final of the 2024 Speedway European Championship and won two rounds of the championship.

In 2025, Ļebedevs finished sixth in the World Championship.

== Major results ==
=== World individual Championship ===
- 2013 Speedway Grand Prix – 19th (9 pts)
- 2014 Speedway Grand Prix – 28th (3 pts)
- 2022 Speedway Grand Prix – 16th (26 pts)
- 2023 Speedway Grand Prix – 16th (31 pts)
- 2024 Speedway Grand Prix – 10th (79 pts)
- 2025 Speedway Grand Prix – 6th (98 pts)
- 2026 Speedway Grand Prix – 10th (67 pts)

=== World team Championships ===
- 2021 Speedway of Nations - 6th
- 2024 Speedway of Nations - 7th

=== Individual European Championship ===
- 2017 Speedway European Championship – 1st (European Champion with 52 points)
- 2024 Speedway European Championship – 1st (European Champion with 50 points)

=== U21 European Championship ===
- Individual Speedway Junior European Championship
  - 2013 – Silver medal

== See also ==
- Latvia national speedway team
- List of Speedway Grand Prix riders
