= 2022 Speedway Grand Prix of Croatia =

Speedway Grand Prix event

- Venue: Stadium Milenium
- Location: Donji Kraljevec (Goričan)
- Start date: 30 April 2022
- Competitors: 16 (2 reserves)

The 2022 FIM Speedway Grand Prix of Croatia was the first race of the 2022 Speedway Grand Prix season. It took place on 30 April at the Stadium Milenium in Donji Kraljevec, Croatia. It was the fourth Speedway Grand Prix of Croatia and returned following a nine-year absence.

The event was won by Bartosz Zmarzlik (his 16th career Grand Prix win).

== Grand Prix result ==
Placing	Rider	1	2	3	4	5	6	7	8	9	10	11	12	13	14	15	16	17	18	19	20	Pts	SF1	SF2	Final	GP Pts
1	(Poland) (5) Bartosz Zmarzlik		3			1					2					3					3	12		3	3	20
2	(Poland) (16) Maciej Janowski				3				3	3						2			2			13	2		2	18
3	(Denmark) (9) Mikkel Michelsen			3		0						3					2		3			11		2	1	16
4	(Denmark) (11) Anders Thomsen			t				1		2					3						2	8	3		0	14
5	(Denmark) (12) Leon Madsen			2					2		3			1						3		11	1			12
6	(Slovenia) (7) Matej Žagar		1					2					2	3					1			9		1		11
7	(United Kingdom) (2) Robert Lambert	3					3				1				0				0			7	0			10
8	(Australia) (1) Jason Doyle	2				3				t				0				3				8		0		9
9	(Sweden) (10) Freddie Lindgren			1			2						3			0		0				6				8
10	(Slovakia) (8) Martin Vaculík		0						1			1			1			3				6				7
11	(United Kingdom) (13) Dan Bewley				1	2							0		2					1		6				6
12	(Poland) (4) Patryk Dudek	1							0				1				3				0	5				5
13	(United Kingdom) (15) Tai Woffinden				0			3			0						1	1				5				4
14	(Australia) (3) Jack Holder	0						0				2				1				2		5				3
15	(Australia) (14) Max Fricke				2		0					0		2							1	5				2
16	(Poland) (6) Paweł Przedpełski		2				1			m							0			0		3				1
R1	(Slovenia) (R1) Nick Škorja			0						1												1	R1			
R2	(Hungary) (R2) Dennis Fazekas									0												0	R2			

m - exclusion for exceeding two minute time allowance • t - exclusion for touching the tapes • x - other exclusion • e - retired or mechanical failure • f - fell • ns - non-starter • nc - non-classify

gate A - inside	gate B	gate C	gate D - outside
