= 2022 Speedway Grand Prix of Czech Republic =

Speedway Grand Prix event

- Venue: Markéta Stadium
- Location: Prague (Czech Republic)
- Start date: 28 May 2022
- Competitors: 16 (2 reserves)

The 2022 FIM Speedway Grand Prix of Czech Republic was the third race of the 2022 Speedway Grand Prix season. It took place on 28 May at the Markéta Stadium in Prague, Czech Republic. It was the 28th Speedway Grand Prix of Czech Republic.

The event was won by Martin Vaculík (his fourth career Grand Prix win).

== Grand Prix result ==
Placing	Rider	1	2	3	4	5	6	7	8	9	10	11	12	13	14	15	16	17	18	19	20	Pts	SF1	SF2	Final	GP Pts
1	(Slovakia) (14) Martin Vaculík				3		2					2		3							2	12		3	3	20
2	(United Kingdom) (8) Tai Woffinden		1						3			3			3			3				13	2		2	18
3	(Australia) (3) Jason Doyle	3						1				0				3				1		8		2	1	16
4	(Poland) (7) Maciej Janowski		3					0					1	2					3			9	3		m	14
5	(Poland) (5) Bartosz Zmarzlik		2			1					3					2					3	11		1		12
6	(United Kingdom) (1) Dan Bewley	1				3				2				f				2				8	1			11
7	(Denmark) (12) Leon Madsen			2					0		2			1						3		8	0			10
8	(Denmark) (16) Anders Thomsen				2				2	3						0			0			7		f		9
9	(Australia) (13) Max Fricke				0	0							3		2					2		7				8
10	(Australia) (11) Jack Holder			3				2		0					1						1	7				7
11	(Sweden) (10) Freddie Lindgren			1			3						2			1		0				7				6
12	(Poland) (15) Patryk Dudek				1			3			1						0	1				6				5
13	(United Kingdom) (9) Robert Lambert			0		2						1					1		2			6				4
14	(Denmark) (4) Mikkel Michelsen	0							1				0				3				0	4				3
15	(Poland) (2) Paweł Przedpełski	2					0				0				0				1			3				2
16	(Czech Republic) (6) Jan Kvěch		0				m			1							2			0		3				1
R1	(Czech Republic) (R1) Daniel Klíma						1															1	R1			
R2	(Czech Republic) (R2) Petr Chlupáč																					0	R2			

m - exclusion for exceeding two minute time allowance • t - exclusion for touching the tapes • x - other exclusion • e - retired or mechanical failure • f - fell • ns - non-starter • nc - non-classify

gate A - inside	gate B	gate C	gate D - outside
