= 2022 Speedway Grand Prix =

Speedway Grand Prix season

Season details
- Dates: 30 April - 1 October
- Events: 10
- Cities: 10
- Countries: 7
- Riders: 15 permanents 1 wild card(s); 2 track reserves
- Heats: 230 (in 10 events)

Winners
- Champion: POL Bartosz Zmarzlik
- Runner-up: DEN Leon Madsen
- 3rd place: POL Maciej Janowski

The 2022 Speedway Grand Prix season was the 28th season of the Speedway Grand Prix era, and decided the 77th FIM Speedway World Championship. It was the first series promoted by Discovery Sports Events.

Artem Laguta was the reigning champion, having won the 2021 title. However, due to the invasion of Ukraine by Russia, he and Emil Sayfutdinov did not return as all Russian and Belarusian riders had been suspended and were barred from participating in any FIM-sanctioned events.

Bartosz Zmarzlik won the championship, claiming a third world title. Leon Madsen finished as runner-up, with Maciej Janowski taking the last spot on the podium.

== Qualification ==
For the 2022 season, there were 15 permanent riders who joined each Grand Prix with one wild card and two track reserves.

The top six riders from the 2021 championship qualified automatically. These riders were joined by the three riders who qualified via the Grand Prix Challenge, and the 2021 Speedway European Championship winner.

The final five riders were nominated by the SGP Commission following the completion of the 2021 season.

Following the Russian invasion of Ukraine, Discovery Sports Events made the decision to suspend Artem Laguta and Emil Sayfutdinov in line with the FIM's ban on Russian riders. They were replaced in the line-up by Jack Holder and Dan Bewley.

=== Qualified riders ===
#	Riders	2021 place	GP Ch place	Appearance	Previous appearances in series
95	(Poland) Bartosz Zmarzlik	2	—	7th	2012–2015, 2016–2021
66	(Sweden) Fredrik Lindgren	4	—	13th	2004, 2006–2007, 2008–2014, 2016, 2017–2021
71	(Poland) Maciej Janowski	5	—	8th	2008, 2012, 2014, 2015–2021
108	(United Kingdom) Tai Woffinden	6	—	11th	2010, 2011, 2013–2021
30	(Denmark) Leon Madsen	7	—	4th	2010, 2013, 2019–2021
69	(Australia) Jason Doyle	9	—	8th	2015–2021
505	(United Kingdom) Robert Lambert	10	13	2nd	2015, 2018–2019, 2021
105	(Denmark) Anders Thomsen	11	—	2nd	2016, 2020, 2021
54	(Slovakia) Martin Vaculík	12	—	7th	2012, 2013, 2017–2021
323	(Poland) Paweł Przedpełski	17	1	1st	2016, 2017, 2021
46	(Australia) Max Fricke	8	2	3rd	2016–2017, 2019, 2020–2021
692	(Poland) Patryk Dudek	—	3	5th	2016, 2017–2020
155	(Denmark) Mikkel Michelsen	18	—	2nd	2015, 2018–2019, 2020, 2021
25	(Australia) Jack Holder	—	—	1st	2016, 2020
99	(United Kingdom) Dan Bewley	—	7	1st	2018

=== Qualified substitutes ===
The following riders were nominated as substitutes:

#	Riders	2021 place	GP Ch place
29	(Latvia) Andžejs Ļebedevs	—	6
515	(Poland) Jakub Miśkowiak	—	—
266	(Denmark) Mads Hansen	35	—
22	(United States) Luke Becker	—	—
415	(France) David Bellego	—	—

== Calendar ==
The 2022 season consisted of 10 events.

Round	Date	City and venue	Winner	Runner-up	3rd placed	4th placed	Results
1	30 April	(Croatia) Goričan, Croatia; Stadium Milenium	(Poland) Bartosz Zmarzlik	(Poland) Maciej Janowski	(Denmark) Mikkel Michelsen	(Denmark) Anders Thomsen	results
2	14 May	(Poland) Warsaw, Poland; Stadion Narodowy	(Australia) Max Fricke	(Denmark) Leon Madsen	(Sweden) Fredrik Lindgren	(Denmark) Mikkel Michelsen	results
3	28 May	(Czech Republic) Prague, Czech Republic; Markéta Stadium	(Slovakia) Martin Vaculík	(United Kingdom) Tai Woffinden	(Australia) Jason Doyle	(Poland) Maciej Janowski	results
4	4 June	(Germany) Teterow, Germany; Bergring Arena	(Poland) Patryk Dudek	(Poland) Bartosz Zmarzlik	(Sweden) Fredrik Lindgren	(United Kingdom) Robert Lambert	results
5	25 June	Gorzów, Poland; Edward Jancarz Stadium	(Denmark) Anders Thomsen	(Slovakia) Martin Vaculík	(Poland) Bartosz Zmarzlik	(Poland) Patryk Dudek	results
6	13 August	(United Kingdom) Cardiff, Great Britain; Principality Stadium	(United Kingdom) Dan Bewley	(Poland) Bartosz Zmarzlik	(Poland) Patryk Dudek	(Denmark) Leon Madsen	results
7	27 August	Wrocław, Poland; Olympic Stadium	(United Kingdom) Dan Bewley	(Denmark) Leon Madsen	(United Kingdom) Robert Lambert	(Poland) Maciej Janowski	results
8	10 September	(Denmark) Vojens, Denmark; Vojens Speedway Center	(Poland) Bartosz Zmarzlik	(United Kingdom) Robert Lambert	(Denmark) Leon Madsen	(Poland) Patryk Dudek	results
9	17 September	(Sweden) Målilla, Sweden; Skrotfrag Arena	(Poland) Bartosz Zmarzlik	(Sweden) Fredrik Lindgren	(Poland) Maciej Janowski	(United Kingdom) Tai Woffinden	results
10	1 October	Toruń, Poland; Rose Motoarena	(Slovakia) Martin Vaculík	(Poland) Bartosz Zmarzlik	(Denmark) Leon Madsen	(Poland) Maciej Janowski	results

== Final Classification ==
Qualifies for next season's Grand Prix series
Full-time Grand Prix rider
Wild card, track reserve or qualified reserve

Pos.	Rider	Points	CRO (Croatia)	POL (Poland)	CZE (Czech Republic)	GER (Germany)	PL2 (Poland)	GBR (United Kingdom)	PL3 (Poland)	DEN (Denmark)	SWE (Sweden)	PL4 (Poland)
Gold	(Poland) (95) Bartosz Zmarzlik (C)	166	20	12	12	18	16	18	12	20	20	18
Silver	(Denmark) (30) Leon Madsen	133	12	18	10	10	10	14	18	16	9	16
Bronze	(Poland) (71) Maciej Janowski	106	18	11	14	8	2	7	14	2	16	14
4	(Sweden) (66) Fredrik Lindgren	103	8	16	6	16	5	11	8	4	18	11
5	(United Kingdom) (505) Robert Lambert	103	10	8	4	14	11	5	16	18	11	6
6	(United Kingdom) (99) Dan Bewley	102	6	3	11	12	12	20	20	7	2	9
7	(Poland) (692) Patryk Dudek	102	5	5	5	20	14	16	11	14	10	2
8	(United Kingdom) (108) Tai Woffinden	93	4	10	18	11	7	4	10	10	14	5
9	(Slovakia) (54) Martin Vaculík	91	7	2	20	6	18	–	5	1	12	20
10	(Australia) (69) Jason Doyle	83	9	6	16	4	9	9	4	11	8	7
11	(Denmark) (155) Mikkel Michelsen	82	16	14	3	1	8	10	9	9	–	12
12	(Australia) (25) Jack Holder	67	3	7	7	9	6	12	6	8	6	3
13	(Australia) (46) Max Fricke	52	2	20	8	2	1	8	2	6	3	–
14	(Denmark) (105) Anders Thomsen	51	14	1	9	5	20	2	–	–	–	–
15	(Poland) (323) Paweł Przedpełski	29	1	9	2	3	4	3	3	3	1	0
16	(Latvia) (29) Andžejs Ļebedevs	26	–	–	–	–	–	6	1	5	4	10
17	(Denmark) (16) Rasmus Jensen	12	–	–	–	–	–	–	–	12	–	–
18	(Slovenia) (16) Matej Žagar	11	11	–	–	–	–	–	–	–	–	–
19	(Poland) (16) Kacper Woryna	8	–	–	–	–	–	–	–	–	–	8
20	(Germany) (16) Kai Huckenbeck	7	–	–	–	7	–	–	–	–	–	–
"	(Poland) (16) Gleb Chugunov	7	–	–	–	–	–	–	7	–	–	–
"	(Denmark) (266) Mads Hansen	7	–	–	–	–	–	–	–	–	7	–
23	(Sweden) (16) Oliver Berntzon	5	–	–	–	–	–	–	–	–	5	–
24	(Poland) (16) Maksym Drabik	4	–	4	–	–	–	–	–	–	–	–
"	(Poland) (515) Jakub Miśkowiak	4	–	–	–	–	–	–	–	–	–	4
26	(Poland) (16) Szymon Woźniak	3	–	–	–	–	3	–	–	–	–	–
27	(Czech Republic) (16) Jan Kvěch	1	–	–	1	–	–	–	–	–	–	–
"	(United Kingdom) (17) Tom Brennan	1	–	–	–	–	–	1	–	–	–	–
"	(Poland) (17) Krzysztof Lewandowski	1	–	–	–	–	–	–	–	–	–	1
Pos.	Rider	Points	CRO (Croatia)	POL (Poland)	CZE (Czech Republic)	GER (Germany)	PL2 (Poland)	GBR (United Kingdom)	PL3 (Poland)	DEN (Denmark)	SWE (Sweden)	PL4 (Poland)

== See also ==
- 2022 Individual Long Track World Championship
- 2022 Speedway of Nations
