= 2022 Speedway Grand Prix of Denmark =

Speedway Grand Prix event

- Venue: Vojens Speedway Center
- Location: Vojens (Denmark)
- Start date: 10 September 2022
- Competitors: 16 (2 reserves)

The 2022 FIM Speedway Grand Prix of Denmark was the eighth round of the 2022 Speedway Grand Prix season. It took place on 10 September at the Vojens Speedway Center in Vojens, Denmark. It was the 27th Speedway Grand Prix of Denmark.

The event was won by Bartosz Zmarzlik (his 17th career Grand Prix win).

== Grand Prix result ==
Placing	Rider	1	2	3	4	5	6	7	8	9	10	11	12	13	14	15	16	17	18	19	20	Pts	SF1	SF2	Final	GP Pts
1	(Poland) (5) Bartosz Zmarzlik		2			0					3					3					2	10		2	3	20
2	(United Kingdom) (4) Robert Lambert	2							3				t				0				3	8	3		2	18
3	(Denmark) (9) Leon Madsen			1		3						0					3		3			10	2		1	16
4	(Poland) (13) Patryk Dudek				3	2							2		3					1		11		3	0	14
5	(Denmark) (1) Rasmus Jensen	3				1				2				2				2				10	1			12
6	(Australia) (8) Jason Doyle		3						0			2			2			1				8		1		11
7	(United Kingdom) (6) Tai Woffinden		0				3			3							2			3		11	0			10
8	(Denmark) (7) Mikkel Michelsen		1					3					3	3					1			11		0		9
9	(Australia) (10) Jack Holder			2			1						1			0		3				7				8
10	(United Kingdom) (14) Dan Bewley				0		2					3		1							t	6				7
11	(Australia) (2) Max Fricke	1					0				2				1				2			6				6
12	(Latvia) (3) Andžejs Ļebedevs	0						1				1				2				2		6				5
13	(Sweden) (12) Freddie Lindgren			3					1		1			0						0		5				4
14	(Poland) (11) Paweł Przedpełski			0				2		1					0						1	4				3
15	(Poland) (16) Maciej Janowski				1				2	0						1			0			4				2
16	(Slovakia) (15) Martin Vaculík				2			e			e						1	0				3				1
R1	(Denmark) (R1) Benjamin Basso												0									0	R1			
R2	(Denmark) (R2) Emil Breum																				0	0	R2			

m - exclusion for exceeding two minute time allowance • t - exclusion for touching the tapes • x - other exclusion • e - retired or mechanical failure • f - fell • ns - non-starter • nc - non-classify

gate A - inside	gate B	gate C	gate D - outside
