= 2022 Speedway Grand Prix of Poland =

Speedway Grand Prix event

- Venue: Stadion Narodowy; Edward Jancarz Stadium; Olympic Stadium; MotoArena Toruń
- Location: Warsaw; Gorzów; Wrocław; Toruń
- Start date: 14 May; 25 June; 27 August; 1 October
- Competitors: 16 (2 reserves)

The 2022 FIM Speedway Grand Prix of Poland was the second, fifth, seventh and tenth rounds of the 2022 Speedway Grand Prix season (the World Championship).

The second round took place on 14 May 2021 at the Stadion Narodowy in Warsaw. The fifth round took place at the Edward Jancarz Stadium in Gorzów Wielkopolski on 25 June. The seventh round was held on 27 August at the Olympic Stadium in Wrocław and the tenth and final round was held on 1 October at the MotoArena Toruń in Toruń.

The rounds were the 54th to 57th Speedway Grand Prix of Poland respectively.

Four different riders won the four events, with Australian Max Fricke winning the Warsaw Grand Prix (his 2nd career Grand Prix win) and Anders Thomsen claiming his maiden career Grand Prix win in Gorzów.

At Wrocław, Dan Bewley won his second consecutive Grand Prix, just two weeks after his inaugural victory in Cardiff and Martin Vaculík won the final round in Toruń (his fifth career Grand Prix win).

== Results ==
=== Event 1 - Orlen Warsaw Grand Prix (14 May) ===
Placing	Rider	1	2	3	4	5	6	7	8	9	10	11	12	13	14	15	16	17	18	19	20	Pts	SF1	SF2	Final	GP Pts
1	(Australia) (14) Max Fricke				0		3					3		1							3	10	3		3	20
2	(Denmark) (13) Leon Madsen				3	3							0		3					1		10		2	2	18
3	(Sweden) (7) Freddie Lindgren		2					0					3	3					f			8	2		1	16
4	(Denmark) (3) Mikkel Michelsen	3						2				1				2				0		8		3	f	14
5	(Poland) (5) Bartosz Zmarzlik		3			2					2					3					2	12	1			12
6	(Poland) (12) Maciej Janowski			3					3		1			0						3		10		1		11
7	(United Kingdom) (9) Tai Woffinden			2		1						0					3		3			9		0		10
8	(Poland) (2) Paweł Przedpełski	2					1				3				1				2			9	0			9
9	(United Kingdom) (4) Robert Lambert	1							2				2				2				1	8				8
10	(Australia) (6) Jack Holder		0				2			3							0			2		7				7
11	(Australia) (15) Jason Doyle				2			3			0						1	f				6				6
12	(Poland) (10) Patryk Dudek			1			f						1			1		3				6				5
13	(Poland) (11) Maksym Drabik			0				1		2					2						0	5				4
14	(United Kingdom) (8) Dan Bewley		1						1			2			0			1				5				3
15	(Slovakia) (1) Martin Vaculík	0				0				0				2				2				4				2
16	(Denmark) (16) Anders Thomsen				t				0	1						0			1			2				1
R1	(Poland) (R1) Jakub Miśkowiak				1																	1	R1			
R2	(Ukraine) (R2) Vitaly Lysak																					0	R2			

m - exclusion for exceeding two minute time allowance • t - exclusion for touching the tapes • x - other exclusion • e - retired or mechanical failure • f - fell • ns - non-starter • nc - non-classify

gate A - inside	gate B	gate C	gate D - outside

=== Event 2 - Gorzów Grand Prix (25 June) ===
Placing	Rider	1	2	3	4	5	6	7	8	9	10	11	12	13	14	15	16	17	18	19	20	Pts	SF1	SF2	Final	GP Pts
1	(Denmark) (15) Anders Thomsen				2			3			0						3	1				9		3	3	20
2	(Slovakia) (13) Martin Vaculík				3	2							3		3					2		13	2		2	18
3	(Poland) (6) Bartosz Zmarzlik		1				3			3							1			3		11		2	1	16
4	(Poland) (16) Patryk Dudek				1				3	2						3			2			11	3		0	14
5	(United Kingdom) (5) Dan Bewley		3			1					3					2					3	12		1		12
6	(United Kingdom) (8) Robert Lambert		2						2			2			1			2				9	1			11
7	(Denmark) (1) Leon Madsen	1				0				1				3				3				8	0			10
8	(Australia) (4) Jason Doyle	3							1				2				0				2	8		0		9
9	(Denmark) (11) Mikkel Michelsen			3				2		0					2						0	7				8
10	(United Kingdom) (2) Tai Woffinden	2					0				2				0				3			7				7
11	(Australia) (9) Jack Holder			1		3						0					2		0			6				6
12	(Sweden) (14) Freddie Lindgren				0		1					3		0							1	5				5
13	(Poland) (12) Paweł Przedpełski			2					e		1			1						1		5				4
14	(Poland) (7) Szymon Woźniak		0					1					0	2					1			4				3
15	(Poland) (10) Maciej Janowski			0			2						1			1		f				4				2
16	(Australia) (3) Max Fricke	e						0				1				0				0		1				1
R1	(Poland) (R1) Wiktor Jasiński																					0	R1			
R2	(Poland) (R2) Oskar Paluch																					0	R2			

m - exclusion for exceeding two minute time allowance • t - exclusion for touching the tapes • x - other exclusion • e - retired or mechanical failure • f - fell • ns - non-starter • nc - non-classify

gate A - inside	gate B	gate C	gate D - outside

=== Event 3 - Wrocław Grand Prix (27 August) ===
Placing	Rider	1	2	3	4	5	6	7	8	9	10	11	12	13	14	15	16	17	18	19	20	Pts	SF1	SF2	Final	GP Pts
1	(United Kingdom) (5) Dan Bewley		3			0					1					1					3	8		3	3	20
2	(Denmark) (9) Leon Madsen			3		2						2					2		3			12	2		2	18
3	(United Kingdom) (8) Robert Lambert		2						3			3			2			1				11		2	1	16
4	(Poland) (13) Maciej Janowski				2	3							1		3					2		11	3		0	14
5	(Poland) (15) Bartosz Zmarzlik				3			1			2						3	2				11		1		12
6	(Poland) (12) Patryk Dudek			2					1		3			1						3		10	1			11
7	(United Kingdom) (10) Tai Woffinden			1			3						2			2		3				11		0		10
8	(Denmark) (1) Mikkel Michelsen	3				1				3				2				0				9	0			9
9	(Sweden) (16) Freddie Lindgren				1				2	f						3			2			8				8
10	(Poland) (7) Gleb Chugunov		x					2					0	3					1			6				7
11	(Australia) (3) Jack Holder	1						3				f				0				1		5				6
12	(Slovakia) (4) Martin Vaculík	0							0				3				1				0	4				5
13	(Australia) (11) Jason Doyle			0				0		2					0						2	4				4
14	(Poland) (14) Paweł Przedpełski				0		2					1		0							1	4				3
15	(Australia) (2) Max Fricke	2					1				0				1				0			4				2
16	(Latvia) (6) Andžejs Ļebedevs		1				0			x							0			0		1				1
R1	(Poland) (R1) Bartłomiej Kowalski																					0	R1			
R2	(Poland) (R2) Wiktor Przyjemski																					0	R2			

m - exclusion for exceeding two minute time allowance • t - exclusion for touching the tapes • x - other exclusion • e - retired or mechanical failure • f - fell • ns - non-starter • nc - non-classify

gate A - inside	gate B	gate C	gate D - outside

=== Event 4 - Toruń Grand Prix (1 October) ===
Placing	Rider	1	2	3	4	5	6	7	8	9	10	11	12	13	14	15	16	17	18	19	20	Pts	SF1	SF2	Final	GP Pts
1	(Slovakia) (5) Martin Vaculík		3			3					3					2					2	13	3		3	20
2	(Poland) (12) Bartosz Zmarzlik			2					2		2			3						3		12		3	2	18
3	(Denmark) (1) Leon Madsen	3				0				3				0				3				9	2		1	16
4	(Poland) (14) Maciej Janowski				2		3					2		1							3	11		2	0	14
5	(Denmark) (2) Mikkel Michelsen	1					2				0				3				3			9		1		12
6	(Sweden) (6) Freddie Lindgren		2				1			1							3			1		8	1			11
7	(Latvia) (16) Andžejs Ļebedevs				3				0	2						3			1			9	0			10
8	(United Kingdom) (13) Dan Bewley				0	2							3		2					0		7		0		9
9	(Poland) (10) Kacper Woryna			3			0						2			1		1				7				8
10	(Australia) (15) Jason Doyle				1			3			1						2	x				7				7
11	(United Kingdom) (4) Robert Lambert	2							3				t				1				1	7				6
12	(United Kingdom) (9) Tai Woffinden			1		1						3					t		2			7				5
13	(Poland) (7) Jakub Miśkowiak		1					2					0	2					0			5				4
14	(Australia) (3) Jack Holder	0						1				1				0				2		4				3
15	(Poland) (8) Patryk Dudek		0						1			0			1			2				4				2
16	(Poland) (11) Paweł Przedpełski			0				0		0					0						0	0				1
R1	(Poland) (R1) Krzysztof Lewandowski												1									1	R1			
R2	(Poland) (R2) Mateusz Affelt																0					0	R2			

m - exclusion for exceeding two minute time allowance • t - exclusion for touching the tapes • x - other exclusion • e - retired or mechanical failure • f - fell • ns - non-starter • nc - non-classify

gate A - inside	gate B	gate C	gate D - outside
