= 2022 Speedway Grand Prix of Sweden =

Speedway Grand Prix event

2022 Speedway Grand Prix of Denmark
- Venue: Skrotfrag Arena
- Location: Målilla (Sweden)
- Start date: 17 September 2022
- Competitors: 16 (2 reserves)

The 2022 FIM Speedway Grand Prix of Sweden was the ninth round of the 2022 Speedway Grand Prix season (the World Championship of speedway). It took place on 17 September at the Skrotfrag Arena in Målilla, Sweden. It was the 27th Speedway Grand Prix of Sweden.

The event was won by Bartosz Zmarzlik (his 18th career Grand Prix win).

== Grand Prix result ==
Placing	Rider	1	2	3	4	5	6	7	8	9	10	11	12	13	14	15	16	17	18	19	20	Pts	SF1	SF2	Final	GP Pts
1	(Poland) (8) Bartosz Zmarzlik		2						3			3			3			3				14		3	3	20
2	(Sweden) (10) Freddie Lindgren			1			2						3			2		1				9	2		2	18
3	(Poland) (5) Maciej Janowski		3			0					3					3					2	11		2	1	16
4	(United Kingdom) (9) Tai Woffinden			0		2						1					3		2			8	3		0	14
5	(Slovakia) (14) Martin Vaculík				3		1					3		3							3	13	1			12
6	(United Kingdom) (12) Robert Lambert			3					3		2			0						3		11		1		11
7	(Poland) (6) Patryk Dudek		0				3			1							2			1		7		0		10
8	(Denmark) (1) Leon Madsen	2				3				3				2				0				10	e			9
9	(Australia) (15) Jason Doyle				2			2			1						0	2				7				8
10	(Denmark) (16) Mads Hansen				1				0	2						0			3			6				7
11	(Australia) (13) Jack Holder				0	1							1		2					2		6				6
12	(Sweden) (3) Oliver Berntzon	1						3				0				1				0		5				5
13	(Latvia) (7) Andžejs Ļebedevs		1					1					2	1					0			5				4
14	(Australia) (2) Max Fricke	3					0				0				1				ns			4				3
15	(United Kingdom) (4) Dan Bewley	0							1				0				1				1	3				2
16	(Poland) (11) Paweł Przedpełski			2				0		0					f						ns	2				1
R1	(Sweden) (R1) Victor Palovaara																		1			1	R1			
R2	(Sweden) (R2) Anton Karlsson																				0	0	R2			

m - exclusion for exceeding two minute time allowance • t - exclusion for touching the tapes • x - other exclusion • e - retired or mechanical failure • f - fell • ns - non-starter • nc - non-classify

gate A - inside	gate B	gate C	gate D - outside
