= 2023 Speedway Grand Prix Qualification =

World speedway event

Speedway Grand Prix Qualification
- Dates: 6 Jun to 20 Aug 2022

The 2023 Individual Speedway World Championship Grand Prix Qualification or GP Challenge (held in 2022) was a series of motorcycle speedway meetings used to determine the three riders that qualified for the 2023 Speedway Grand Prix. The series consisted of four qualifying rounds at Abensberg, Debrecen, Žarnovica and Nagyhalász and the Grand Prix Challenge at Glasgow. Preliminary national qualification events included the 2021 American Final, the Polish Golden Helmet and the DMU qualifier.

The three riders that qualified for the 2023 series were Kim Nilsson, Jack Holder and Max Fricke. Dan Bewley finished second in the Grand Prix Challenge, but he already qualified due to making the top six in the 2022 Speedway Grand Prix series.

In the final Anders Thomsen broke his leg in heat 14 but would later be selected as a permanent rider for the 2023 Speedway Grand Prix.

== Qualifying rounds ==
=== Round One ===
- 6 June 2022
- (Germany) Abensberger Stadion, Abensberg

Pos.	Rider	Points	Details
1	(Denmark) Anders Thomsen	13+3	(2,3,3,3,2)
2	(Germany) Kai Huckenbeck	13+2	(3,2,2,3,3)
3	(Australia) Max Fricke	12	(3,2,1,3,3)
4	(Sweden) Kim Nilsson	11+3	(1,3,3,1,3)
5	(Australia) Chris Holder	11+2	(2,3,2,2,2)
6	(Poland) Patryk Dudek	10	(1,3,1,2,3)
7	(France) Mathieu Trésarrieu	8	(1,2,3,1,1)
8	(Germany) Norick Blödorn	8	(2,1,2,1,2)
9	(Germany) Valentin Grobauer	7	(3,0,0,3,1)
10	(Austria) Dany Gappmaier	6	(3,0,0,2,1)
11	(Finland) Jesse Mustonen	6	(2,1,3,0,0)
12	(Czech Republic) Petr Chlupáč	6	(0,2,2,0,2)
13	(United States) Broc Nicol	5	(0,1,1,2,1)
14	(England) Adam Ellis	3	(1,1,1,0,D)
15	(Norway) Glenn Moi	1	(0,0,0,1,0)
16	(New Zealand) George Congreve	0	(0,0,0,0,0)
	(Germany) Sandro Wasserman	DNR	

=== Round Three ===
- 11 June 2022
- (Slovakia) Žarnovica

Pos.	Rider	Points	Details
1	(Slovakia) Martin Vaculík	14	(3,3,3,3,2)
2	(England) Dan Bewley	13+3	(2,2,3,3,3)
3	(England) Robert Lambert	13+2	(3,1,3,3,3)
4	(Denmark) Rasmus Jensen	12	(3,2,3,1,3)
5	(Sweden) Peter Ljung	11	(1,3,2,2,3)
6	(United States) Luke Becker	10	(2,3,2,2,1)
7	(France) Dimitri Bergé	9	(1,2,2,2,2)
8	(Czech Republic) Jan Kvěch	7	(1,3,2,D,1)
9	(Sweden) Jacob Thorssell	7	(2,1,1,1,2)
10	(Czech Republic) Eduard Krčmář	6	(3,0,1,1,1)
11	(Slovenia) Matic Ivačič	5	(0,1,1,3,0)
12	(Latvia) Daniił Kołodinski	5	(1,2,0,0,2)
13	(Finland) Tero Aarnio	3	(2,D,0,0,1)
14	(United States) Max Ruml	2	(0,0,0,2,0)
15	(Italy) Daniele Tessari	2	(0,1,0,1,0)
16	(Germany) Erik Bachhuber	1	(0,0,1,0,0)
	(Slovakia) Jakub Valković	DNR	
	(Slovakia) Patrik Buri	DNR	

=== Round Two ===
- 6 June 2022
- (Hungary) Debrecen

Pos.	Rider	Points	Details
1	(Australia) Jack Holder	15	(3,3,3,3,3)
2	(Poland) Szymon Woźniak	13	(3,2,3,3,2)
3	(Latvia) Andžejs Ļebedevs	12	(2,3,2,2,3)
4	(Australia) Rohan Tungate	11+3	(2,2,3,1,3)
5	(Denmark) Michael Jepsen Jensen	11+2	(3,2,1,3,2)
6	(Poland) Bartosz Smektała	9	(3,3,0,0,3)
7	(Germany) Erik Riss	8	(2,1,2,3,D)
8	(Czech Republic) Hynek Štichauer	8	(2,1,2,2,1)
9	(Latvia) Oļegs Mihailovs	8	(1,1,2,2,2)
10	(Denmark) Frederik Jakobsen	7	(0,3,1,2,1)
11	(Sweden) Thomas H. Jonasson	5	(1,0,3,D,1)
12	(Slovenia) Anže Grmek	4	(1,0,1,0,2)
13	(France) Steven Goret	4	(1,2,W,1,0)
14	(Hungary) Roland Kovacs	4	(0,1,1,1,1)
15	(Hungary) Norbert Magosi	1	(0,0,0,1,0)
16	(Romania) Andrei Popa	0	(0,0,0,0,0)
17	(Slovenia) Miran Praznik	0	(-,-,0,-,-)
	(Hungary) Sándor Kónya	DNR	

=== Round Four ===
- 11 June 2022
- (Hungary) Nagyhalász Speedway Ring, Nagyhalász

Pos.	Rider	Points	Details
1	(Poland) Dominik Kubera	13+3	(3,3,1,3,3)
2	(Sweden) Oliver Berntzon	13+2	(2,3,2,3,3)
3	(France) David Bellego	12+3	(2,2,3,3,2)
4	(Czech Republic) Václav Milík	12+2	(3,2,3,2,2)
5	(Australia) Brady Kurtz	11	(3,3,2,3,0)
6	(Denmark) Patrick Hansen	10	(2,2,1,2,3)
7	(Slovenia) Nick Škorja	9	(3,1,3,1,1)
8	(England) Chris Harris	8	(0,3,1,2,2)
9	(Ukraine) Marko Levishyn	8	(1,2,2,W,3)
10	(Latvia) Jevgeņijs Kostigovs	7	(1,1,3,0,2)
11	(Italy) Michele Paco Castagna	7	(2,1,2,1,1)
12	(Germany) Lukas Fienhage	4	(1,0,0,2,1)
13	(Argentina) Coty Garcia	3	(0,W,1,1,1)
14	(Argentina) Cristian Zubillaga	2	(1,0,0,1,0)
15	(Hungary) Dennis Fazekas	1	(T,1,0,0,0)
16	(Hungary) Márk Bárány	0	(0,0,0,0,0)
17	(Hungary) Richard Fuzesi	1	(0,-,-,-,-)

== 2022 Speedway Grand Prix Challenge ==
=== Grand Prix Challenge ===
- 20 August 2022
- (Scotland) Glasgow

Pos.	Rider	Points	Details
1	(Sweden) Kim Nilsson	13+3	(2,3,2,3,3)
2	(England) Dan Bewley	13+2	(3,2,3,2,3)
3	(Australia) Jack Holder	12+3	(3,3,2,3,1)
4	(Australia) Max Fricke	12+2	(2,2,3,2,3)
5	(England) Robert Lambert	10	(3,1,3,3,0)
6	(Denmark) Rasmus Jensen	10	(1,3,3,1,2)
7	(Denmark) Michael Jepsen Jensen	9	(0,1,2,3,3)
8	(Australia) Rohan Tungate	7	(1,3,1,2,0)
9	(Latvia) Andžejs Ļebedevs	7	(2,2,0,1,2)
10	(Denmark) Anders Thomsen	5	(3,D,2,W,-)
11	(England) Connor Bailey	5	(1,1,1,0,2)
12	(England) Drew Kemp	5	(1,1,0,2,1)
13	(Australia) Chris Holder	4	(2,2,W,-,-)
14	(France) David Bellego	3	(0,0,1,1,1)
15	(Poland) Dominik Kubera	3	(1,0,1,0,1)
16	(Poland) Szymon Woźniak	2	(0,W,0,D,2)
17	(Czech Republic) Václav Milík	0	(W,-,-,-,-)
DNR	(Sweden) Oliver Berntzon		

- Chris Holder and Michael Jepsen Jensen replaced the injured Martin Vaculík and Kai Huckenbeck.
- Max Fricke qualified in fourth as Dan Bewley finished in the top six in the 2022 Speedway Grand Prix series.

== See also ==
- 2022 Speedway Grand Prix
