= 2022 Speedway Grand Prix of Germany =

Speedway Grand Prix event

- Venue: Bergring Arena
- Location: Teterow (Germany)
- Start date: 3 June 2022
- Competitors: 16 (2 reserves)

The 2022 FIM Speedway Grand Prix of Germany was the fourth round of the 2022 Speedway Grand Prix season (the World Championship of speedway). It took place on 10 June at the Bergring Arena in Teterow, Germany. It was the 12th Speedway Grand Prix of Germany.

The event was won by Patryk Dudek (his third career Grand Prix win).

== Grand Prix result ==
Placing	Rider	1	2	3	4	5	6	7	8	9	10	11	12	13	14	15	16	17	18	19	20	Pts	SF1	SF2	Final	GP Pts
1	(Poland) (11) Patryk Dudek			2				3		3					2						3	13	3		3	20
2	(Poland) (13) Bartosz Zmarzlik				3	2							3		0					2		10		2	2	18
3	(Sweden) (8) Freddie Lindgren		3						1			2			3			2				11		3	1	16
4	(United Kingdom) (5) Robert Lambert		1			1					2					3					2	9	2		0	14
5	(United Kingdom) (14) Dan Bewley				2		3					3		3							1	12		1		12
6	(United Kingdom) (9) Tai Woffinden			f		3						1					3		3			10	1			11
7	(Denmark) (1) Leon Madsen	2				0				2				1				3				8	0			10
8	(Australia) (6) Jack Holder		0				2			1							2			3		8		0		9
9	(Poland) (4) Maciej Janowski	3							2				1				0				0	6				8
10	(Germany) (10) Kai Huckenbeck			3			1						2			t		0				6				7
11	(Slovakia) (12) Martin Vaculík			f					0		3			2						e		5				6
12	(Denmark) (3) Anders Thomsen	0						2				e				2				1		5				5
13	(Australia) (7) Jason Doyle		2					1					0	f					2			5				4
14	(Poland) (16) Paweł Przedpełski				1				3	0						f			0			4				3
15	(Australia) (2) Max Fricke	1					0				1				1				1			4				2
16	(Denmark) (15) Mikkel Michelsen				0			0			0						1	1				2				1
R1	(Germany) (R1) Norick Blödorn															1						1	R1			
R2	(Germany) (R2) Lukas Baumann																					0	R2			

m - exclusion for exceeding two minute time allowance • t - exclusion for touching the tapes • x - other exclusion • e - retired or mechanical failure • f - fell • ns - non-starter • nc - non-classify

gate A - inside	gate B	gate C	gate D - outside
