= 2007 European Speedway Club Champions' Cup =

European motorcycle speedway event

European Speedway Club Champions' Cup
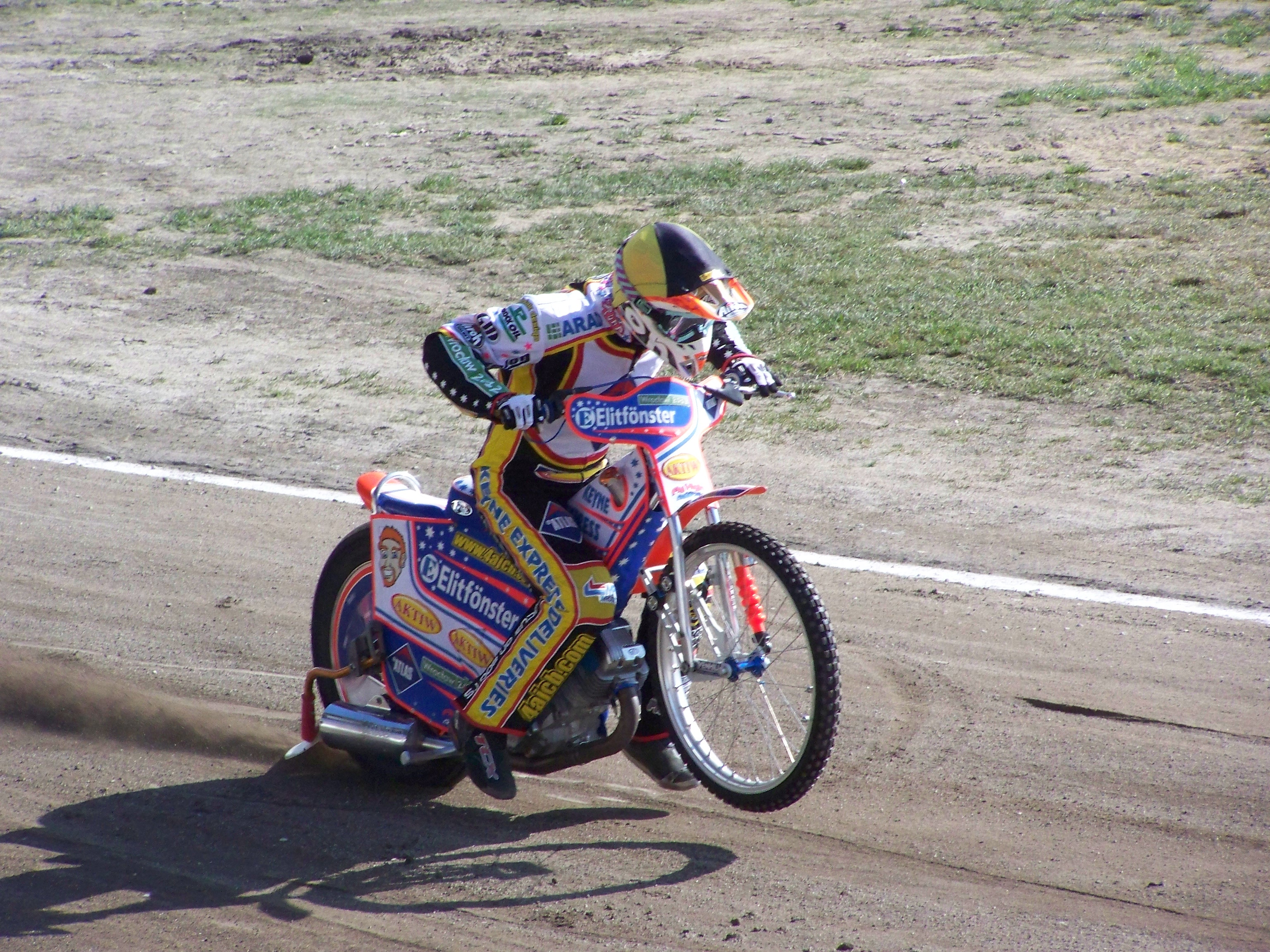
- Australian Jason Crump helped Miskolc take the title.
- Start date: 21 July
- End date: 10 October

The 2007 European Speedway Club Champions' Cup was the tenth motorcycle speedway championship for clubs competing in Europe. It was organised by the European Motorcycle Union (UEM). The competition was primarily for Eastern European teams and only featured Polish teams from three of the 'Big four' leagues, with the British, Swedish and Danish leagues choosing not to compete.

Speedway Miskolc won the championship.

== Calendar ==
Day	Venue	Winner	
Semi-finals
21 July	(Croatia) Goričan	(Croatia) SK Unia Goričan	result
21 July	(Ukraine) Rivne	(Russia) Mega-Lada Togliatti	result
Final
10 October	(Hungary) Miskolc	(Hungary) Speedway Miskolc	result

== Semi-finals ==
=== First semi-final ===
- 21 July 2007
- (Croatia) Stadium Milenium, Goričan
- Referee: Istvan Darago

Placing	Team / Rider Name	Total	1	2	3	4	5	6	7	8	9	10	11	12	13	14	15	16	17	18	19	20	21	22	23	24	25
1	(Croatia) SK Unia Goričan	90	4	8	12	16	20	24	28	32	36	37	41	44	48	52	55	59	62	64	68	72	76	79	83	87	90
1	(1) Jurica Pavlič	20	4					4					4					4					4
1	(2) Adrian Rymel	17		4					4					3					3					3
1	(3) Robert Miśkowiak	18			4					4					4					2					4
1	(4) Mariusz Puszakowski	20				4					4					4					4					4
1	(5) Nikola Martinec	15					4					1					3					4					3
2	(Austria) Radre Pio Natschbach	57	3	3	6	9	11	14	17	17	19	23	26	30	32	34	35	37	39	43	45	48	51	53	53	56	57
2	(1) Manuel Hauzinger	18	3									4		4						4						3
2	(2) Friedrich Wallner	8		0				3							2						2						1
2	(3) Andrea Maida	14			3				3							2						3	3
2	(4) Guglielmo Franchetti	8				3				0							1	2						2
2	(5) Łukasz Kasparek	9					2				2		3						2						0
3	(Slovenia) AMTK Ljubljana	45	0	3	5	6	7	8	9	9	12	14	16	18	19	19	23	23	23	26	30	32	34	37	37	37	45
3	(1) Matej Žagar	0	F							-						-			-								-
3	(2) Jernej Kolenko	23		3							3						4			3			2				8J
3	(3) Izak Šantej	13			2							2	2								4			3
3	(4) Maks Gregorič	6				1		1						2								2			0
3	(5) Matic Voldrih	3					1		1						1			0								0
4	(Germany) MC Pfaffenhofen	39	1	2	2	2	5	7	7	8	9	12	13	14	17	23	23	26	30	31	31	32	32	33	36	37	39
4	(1) Erik Pudel	7	1								1				3							1		1
4	(2) Ronny Weis	16		1								3				6		3							3
4	(3) Max Dilger	7			F			2									0		4							1
4	(4) René Schäfer	4				0			0				1							1							2
4	(5) Mathias Bartz	5					3			1				1							0		F
5	(France) MC Marmande	22	2	4	5	7	7	7	9	12	12	12	12	12	12	13	13	14	15	15	16	16	19	19	20	22	22
5	(1) Theo Pijper	6	2						2								0				1				1
5	(2) Mathieu Trésarrieu	7		2				T		3			0									0				2
5	(3) Stephane Trésarrieu	2			1						0			0				1									0
5	(4) Christophe Dubernard	6				2						X			0				1				3
5	(5) Jeremy Diraison	1					0	-								1				0				0
Placing	Team / Rider Name	Total	1	2	3	4	5	6	7	8	9	10	11	12	13	14	15	16	17	18	19	20	21	22	23	24	25

M - exclusion for exceeding two minute time allowance • T - exclusion for touching the tapes • X - other exclusion • E - retired or mechanical failure • F - fell

Helmet colours was permanent for each teams (Red, Blue, White, Yellow/Black and Green). Colours in diagrams means gate positions:
gate A – inside	gate B	gate C	gate D	gate E – outside

=== Second semi final ===
- 21 July 2007
- (Ukraine) Rivne Speedway Stadium, Rivne
- Referee: Marek Wojaczek

Pos.	Rider	Points	Heats
1	(Russia) Mega-Lada Togliatti		49
1	(Russia) (9) Roman Ivanov	15	(3,3,3,3,3)
1	(Russia) (10) Daniil Ivanov	12	(2,2,3,2,3)
1	(Russia) (12) Denis Saifutdinov	4	(2,-,-,2)
1	(Russia) (13) Ilia Bondarenko	11	(3,2,1,2,3)
1	(Russia) (19) Emil Saifutdinov	7	(3,2,2)
2	(Latvia) Lokomotiv Daugavpils		37
2	(Latvia) (5) Maksims Bogdanovs	11	(3,2,3,2,1)
2	(Russia) (6) Grigory Laguta	13	(2,3,3,3,2)
2	(Latvia) (7) Leonid Paura	9	(x,2,2,3,2)
2	(Latvia) (8) Viaczeslav Gieruckij	4	(0,1,0,f,3)
2	(18) None		
3	(Czech Republic) AK Slaný		21
3	(Czech Republic) (1) Richard Wolff	7	(1,3,1,1,1)
3	(Czech Republic) (2) Martin Malek	4	(1,0,2,0,1)
3	(Czech Republic) (3) Hynek Stichauer	2	(1,0,1,e,-)
3	(Czech Republic) (4) Filip Šitera	8	(1,0,1,3,1,2)
3	(17) None		
4	(Ukraine) Ukraina Rivne		13
4	(Latvia) (13) Ķasts Poudžuks	4	(3,1,0,0,e)
4	(Ukraine) (14) Andriej Karpow	6	(2,1,2,1,0)
4	(Poland) (15 Marek Mróz	1	(0,e,e,1,e)
4	(Poland) (16) Tomasz Łukaszewicz	2	(0,1,0,1,0)
4	(20) None		

== Final ==
- 6 October 2007
- (Hungary) Borsod Volán Stadion, Miskolc
- Referee: Frank Ziegler
- Attendance: 5,000

Pos.	Rider	Points	Heats
1	(Hungary) Speedway Miskolc		47
1	(Denmark) (13) Hans Andersen	14	(3,3,3,3,2)
1	(Hungary) (14) Norbert Magosi	6	(-,0,2,2,2)
1	(Hungary) (15) László Szatmári	0	(0,-,-,-,-)
1	(Slovenia) (16) Matej Ferjan	12	(2,2,3,3,2)
1	(Australia) (20) Jason Crump	15	(3,3,3,3,3)
2	(Poland) Atlas Wrocław		31
2	(Poland) (5) Tomasz Gapiński	10	(3,1,2,1,3)
2	(Poland) (6) Krzysztof Słaboń	10	(3,2,1,3,1)
2	(Poland) (7) Tomasz Jędrzejak	5	(1,e,1,1,2)
2	(Poland) (8) Maciej Janowski	6	(f,2,1,0,3)
2	(18) None		
3	(Russia) Mega-Lada Togliatti		28
3	(Poland) (9) Rune Holta	13	(2,3,3,2,3)
3	(Russia) (10) Daniil Ivanov	3	(1,1,-,0,1)
3	(Russia) (11) Roman Ivanov	6	(-,2,2,2,0)
3	(Russia) (12) Emil Saifutdinov	0	(e,-,0,-,-)
3	(United States) (19) Greg Hancock	6	(2,1,e,2,1)
4	(Croatia) SC Unia Goričan		17
4	(Croatia) (1) Jurica Pavlič	2	(2,n,n,n,n)
4	(Czech Republic) (2) Luboš Tomíček, Jr.	5	(1,1,1,1,1)
4	(Czech Republic) (3) Adrian Rymel	7	(1,3,2,1,0)
4	(Croatia) (4) Ivan Vargek	0	(0,0,0,0,0)
4	(17) None		

Heat after heat:

1. Gapiński, Ferjan, D. Ivanov, Vargek
2. Słaboń, Holta, Rymel, Szatmári
3. Andersen, Hancock, Tomicek, Janowski (F)
4. Crump, Pavlic, Jędrzejak, Saifutdinov (E)
5. Andersen, Słaboń, Hancock, Vargek
6. Rymel, R. Ivanov, Gapiński, Magosi
7. Holta, Ferjan, Tomicek, Jędrzejak (E)
8. Crump, Janowski, D. Ivanov
9. Holta, Magosi, Janowski, Vargek
10. Andersen, Rymel, Jędrzejak, Hancock (E)
11. Crump, Gapiński, Tomicek, Saifutdinov
12. Ferjan, R. Ivanov, Słaboń
13. Ferjan, Hancock, Rymel, Janowski
14. Crump, R. Ivanov, Jędrzejak, Vargek
15. Słaboń, Magosi, Tomicek, D. Ivanov
16. Andersen, Holta, Gapiński
17. Crump, Jędrzejak, Hancock, Vargek (T)
18. Janowski, Magosi, D. Ivanov
19. Gapiński, Ferjan, Tomicek, R. Ivanov
20. Holta, Andersen, Słaboń, Rymel
