= 2022 Speedway Grand Prix Qualification =

The 2022 Individual Speedway World Championship Grand Prix Qualification was a series of motorcycle speedway meetings used to determine the three riders that qualified for the 2022 Speedway Grand Prix. The series consisted of four qualifying rounds at Nagyhalász, Goričan, Terenzano and Glasgow and the Grand Prix Challenge at Žarnovica.

The preliminary qualifiers were originally due to take place in late May but were delayed to June with a change in venue with the Piste de Speedway de Lamothe Landerron and Wack Hofmeister Stadium dropping out of hosting a qualifier due to the pandemic. The 2020 Australian Championship, the American Final and the DMU Qualifier were among the pre-qualifying events staged by national federations to determine their nominations. The three riders that eventually qualified for the 2022 Speedway Grand Prix series via the Grand Prix Challenge were Paweł Przedpełski, Max Fricke and Patryk Dudek.

== Qualifying rounds ==
=== Round One ===
- 19 June 2021
- (Hungary) Nagyhalász Speedway Ring, Nagyhalász

Pos.	Rider	Points	Details
1	(Australia) Rohan Tungate	13+3	(3,3,2,2,3)
2	(Germany) Martin Smolinski	13+2	(2,3,3,3,2)
3	(Latvia) Jevgeņijs Kostigovs	12	(2,3,3,1,2)
4	(Poland) Paweł Przedpełski	11+3	(3,2,1,2,3)
5	(Russia) Sergey Logachev	11+2	(0,2,3,3,3)
6	(Russia) Grigory Laguta	9	(3,1,2,2,1)
7	(Germany) Kevin Wölbert	8	(2,0,2,2,2)
8	(Denmark) Patrick Hansen	7	(3,2,0,U,2)
9	(Latvia) Oļegs Mihailovs	7	(2,1,3,1,0)
10	(France) Dimitri Bergé	7	(1,2,1,3,0)
11	(Sweden) Kim Nilsson	7	(1,1,1,3,1)
12	(Finland) Victor Palovaara	4	(0,3,0,0,1)
13	(Ukraine) Marko Levishyn	4	(1,W,1,W,2)
14	(Czech Republic) Eduard Krčmář	3	(1,0,2,-,-)
15	(Bulgaria) Milen Manev	2	(D,1,0,0,1)
16	(Hungary) Dennis Fazekas	1	(0,0,0,1,0)
17	(Hungary) Roland Kovacs	1	(-,-,-,1,-)
18	(Hungary) Márk Bárány	0	(-,-,-,-,D)

=== Round Three ===
- 19 June 2021
- (Italy) Terenzano

Pos.	Rider	Points	Details
1	(Poland) Patryk Dudek	14	(3,2,3,3,3)
2	(Denmark) Mikkel Michelsen	12	(0,3,3,3,3)
3	(England) Adam Ellis	11+3	(3,1,3,2,2)
4	(Australia) Max Fricke	11+2	(2,1,2,3,3)
5	(Italy) Nicolas Covatti	10	(1,3,3,U,3)
6	(Denmark) Anders Thomsen	9	(3,3,T,2,1)
7	(Czech Republic) Josef Franc	7	(2,D,0,3,2)
8	(Austria) Dany Gappmaier	7	(2,0,1,2,2)
9	(Germany) Kai Huckenbeck	7	(2,2,2,D,1)
10	(Sweden) Jacob Thorssell	7	(1,1,1,2,2)
11	(Poland) Piotr Pawlicki Jr.	6	(3,3,W,0,0)
12	(Finland) Timo Lahti	5	(0,2,2,1,D)
13	(Italy) Michele Paco Castagna	5	(1,2,W,1,1)
14	(France) Mathieu Trésarrieu	3	(1,U,2,D,-)
15	(Germany) Valentin Grobauer	2	(0,0,1,D,1)
16	(France) Jordan Dubernard	0	(0,1,W,U,-)
17	(Italy) Daniele Tessari	0	(-,-,W,-,-)
18	(Italy) Michele Menani	0	(-,-,-,0,0)

=== Round Two ===
- 19 June 2021
- (Croatia) Goričan

Pos.	Rider	Points	Details
1	(Poland) Janusz Kołodziej	15	(3,3,3,3,3)
2	(Latvia) Andžejs Ļebedevs	13	(1,3,3,3,3)
3	(England) Robert Lambert	11+3	(3,W,3,3,2)
4	(Czech Republic) Jan Kvěch	11+2	(3,3,2,2,1)
5	(Sweden) Oliver Berntzon	11+1	(2,2,2,3,2)
6	(Czech Republic) Václav Milík	10	(3,2,1,1,3)
7	(Ukraine) Aleksandr Loktaev	9	(0,2,3,2,2)
8	(Russia) Roman Lakhbaum	8	(2,3,1,2,U)
9	(Australia) Jack Holder	7	(2,W,0,2,3)
10	(Latvia) Daniił Kołodinski	6	(1,1,2,1,1)
11	(Italy) Nicolas Vicentin	5	(2,0,W,1,2)
12	(Slovenia) Matic Ivačič	4	(0,2,2,D,D)
13	(Slovenia) Anże Grmek	4	(1,1,D,1,1)
14	(Slovakia) Jakub Valković	2	(0,1,1,0,0)
15	(Slovenia) Nick Škorja	2	(1,W,1,-,-)
16	(Slovenia) Miran Praznik	1	(-,-,-,U,1)
17	(Romania) Andrei Popa	0	(0,0,W,-,-)

=== Round Four ===
- 19 June 2021
- (Scotland) Glasgow

Pos.	Rider	Points	Details
1	(Poland) Tobiasz Musielak	15	(3,3,3,3,3)
2	(Australia) Chris Holder	13	(2,3,3,2,3)
3	(Denmark) Nicolai Klindt	12	(3,1,3,3,2)
4	(England) Dan Bewley	11+3	(1,2,3,2,3)
5	(Denmark) Rasmus Jensen	11+2	(3,2,1,2,3)
6	(Australia) Jaimon Lidsey	10	(2,3,1,3,1)
7	(England) Tom Brennan	9	(2,-,2,3,2)
8	(United States) Luke Becker	9	(2,2,2,1,2)
9	(Germany) Erik Riss	7	(0,3,2,1,1)
10	(England) Charles Wright	7	(1,W,2,2,2)
11	(England) Lewis Kerr	6	(3,2,0,1,0)
12	(United States) Broc Nicol	3	(1,0,1,0,1)
13	(Norway) Lasse Fredriksen	3	(1,1,0,0,1)
14	(United States) Max Ruml	3	(U,1,1,1,0)
15	(England) Drew Kemp	1	(-,1,0,0,0)
16	(France) Steven Goret	0	(0,0,D,0,D)
17	(New Zealand) Bradley Wilson-Dean	0	(T,-,-,-,-)
18	(Finland) Tero Aarnio	0	(0,W,-,-,-)

== 2021 Speedway Grand Prix Challenge ==
=== Grand Prix Challenge ===
- 21 August 2021
- (Slovakia) Žarnovica

Pos.	Rider	Points	Details
1	(Poland) Paweł Przedpełski	12+3	(3,2,3,3,1)
2	(Australia) Max Fricke	12+2	(1,3,2,3,3)
3	(Poland) Patryk Dudek	11	(2,2,1,3,3)
4	(Poland) Janusz Kołodziej	10	(1,3,3,3,0)
5	(Germany) Martin Smolinski	10	(3,3,2,1,1)
6	(Latvia) Andžejs Ļebedevs	9	(2,2,2,2,1)
7	(England) Dan Bewley	8	(0,3,2,0,3)
8	(Australia) Chris Holder	8	(3,0,3,0,2)
9	(Latvia) Jevgeņijs Kostigovs	8	(2,2,1,1,2)
10	(Czech Republic) Jan Kvěch	8	(2,1,1,2,2)
11	(Denmark) Nicolai Klindt	7	(0,0,3,1,3)
12	(Poland) Tobiasz Musielak	6	(3,1,T,2,D)
13	(England) Robert Lambert	6	(1,1,0,2,2)
14	(England) Adam Ellis	4	(1,1,0,1,1)
15	(Australia) Rohan Tungate	1	(0,W,1,D,W)
16	(Slovakia) Jakub Valković	0	(0,0,0,0,0)
	(Czech Republic) Vaclav Milik	0	(-,-,0,-,-)

- Following the suspension of Artem Laguta and Emil Sayfutdinov due to the Russian invasion of Ukraine, Discovery Sports Events elected to give a wildcard to number one and two of the reserve list of 2022, Jack Holder and Dan Bewley.

== See also ==
- 2022 Speedway Grand Prix
