= Speedway Grand Prix of Croatia =

Croatian round of the world speedway championship

(Croatia) Croatian Speedway Grand Prix
- Stadium: Stadium Milenium, Donji Kraljevec / Goričan
- Years: 6 (2010-12, 2022-present)
- Track: speedway track
- Track Length: 305 m

Last Event (season 2024)
- Date: 27 April 2024
- Winner: (Australia) Jack Holder

The Speedway Grand Prix of Croatia is a motorcycle speedway event that forms part of the Speedway Grand Prix Series (Speedway's World Championship).

== History ==
In 2023, Polish rider Bartosz Zmarzlik became the first rider to win the event more than once.

In 2024, the Stadium Milenium held the opening round of 2024 Speedway Grand Prix (the World Championship). It was the sixth time that the stadium near Donji Kraljevec has hosted the event and Australian Jack Holder recorded the first Grand Prix win of his career.

Croatia was not included in the 2025 calendar.

== Winners ==
	Season	City	Stadium	Winner
1	2010	Donji Kraljevec	Stadium Milenium	(United States) Greg Hancock	result
2	2011	Donji Kraljevec	Stadium Milenium	(Sweden) Andreas Jonsson	result
3	2012	Donji Kraljevec	Stadium Milenium	(Denmark) Nicki Pedersen	result
4	2022	Donji Kraljevec	Stadium Milenium	(Poland) Bartosz Zmarzlik	result
5	2023	Donji Kraljevec	Stadium Milenium	(Poland) Bartosz Zmarzlik	result
6	2024	Donji Kraljevec	Stadium Milenium	(Australia) Jack Holder	result

== See also ==
- Speedway Grand Prix
