= Palinovec =

- Village
- Location within Croatia
- Coordinates: 46°24′N 16°36′E
- Country: Croatia
- County: Međimurje County
- Municipality: Donji Kraljevec

Area
  - Total: 6.6 km^{2} (2.5 sq mi)

Population (2021)
  - Total: 630
  - Density: 95/km^{2} (250/sq mi)
- Time zone: UTC+1 (CET)
  - Summer (DST): UTC+2 (CEST)
- Postal code: 4032 Donji Kraljevec
- Area code: 040

Palinovec is a village in Croatia.
