= Nagyhalász Speedway Ring =

Stadium in Nagyhalász, Hungary

- Location: Nagyhalász, Rétköz u. 44, 4485 Hungary
- Coordinates: 48°07′47″N 21°44′32″E
- Opened: 2015
- Length: 300 m (0.19 mi)

Nagyhalász Speedway Ring is a motorcycle speedway track, located approximately 1 kilometre (0.62 mi) west of Nagyhalász on the Rétköz u road. The track is 300 metres (980 ft) in length.

== Speedway ==
The stadium was opened in 2015 by József Albók. It quickly became a significant venue for motorcycle speedway and was chosen to host important events. It held rounds of the 2017 Speedway European Championship and 2019 Speedway European Championship before being selected for a round of the 2021 Individual Speedway Junior European Championship.

The events proved to be a success, which led to a semi-final award of the 2022 European Pairs Speedway Championship, the qualifier for the 2022 Speedway Grand Prix. and the 2022 European Under-19 Individual Speedway Championship final.

The following year in 2023, the stadium continued to be chosen as a venue for major meetings and held three more leading events; the 2023 Speedway European Championship qualifier, a 2023 European Pairs Speedway Championship round and a 2023 Speedway Grand Prix Qualification round
