= Donji Pustakovec =

- Village
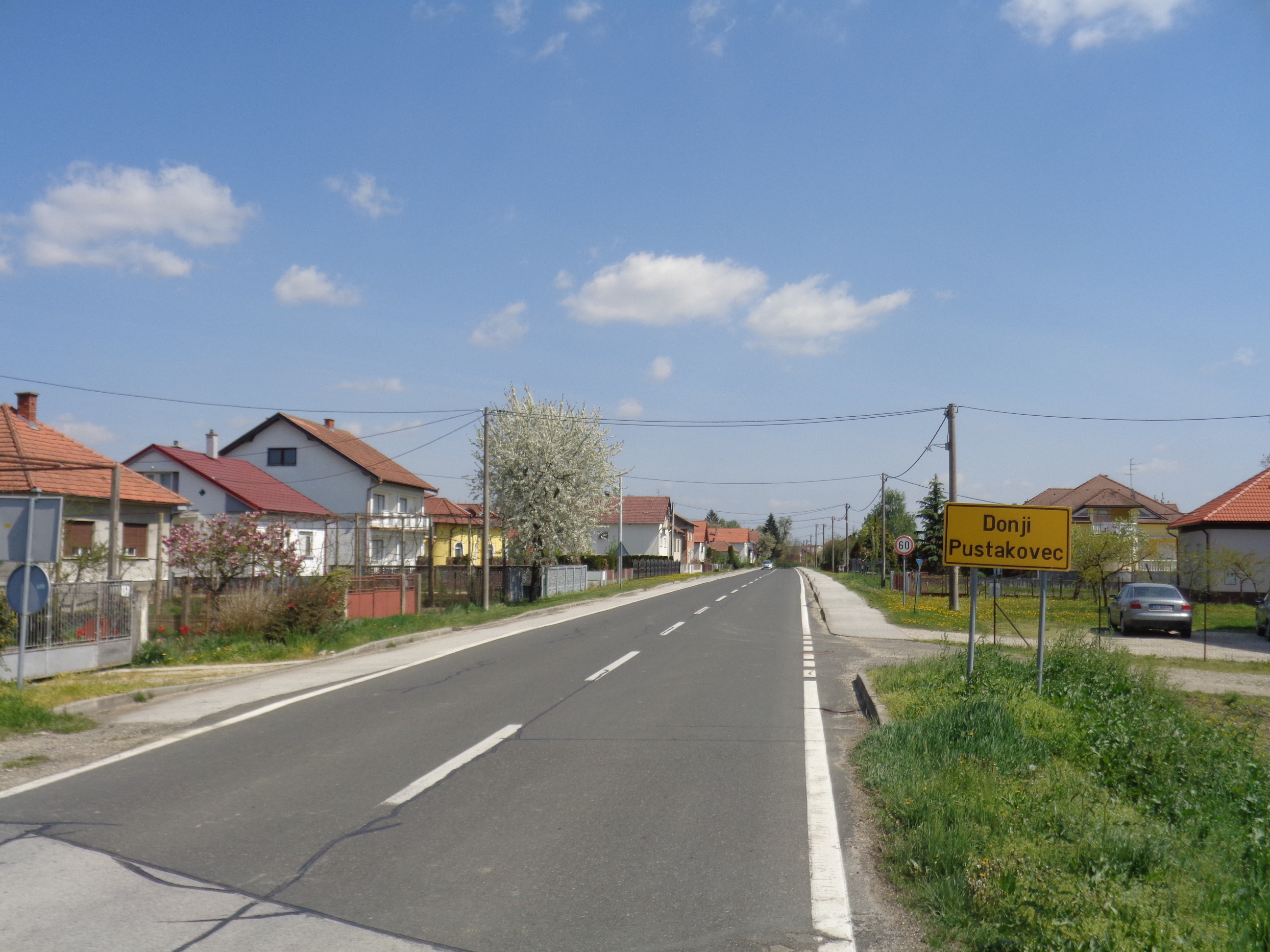
- village entrance

- Location within Croatia
- Coordinates: 46°22′30″N 16°35′42″E
- Country: Croatia
- County: Međimurje County
- Municipality: Donji Kraljevec

Area
  - Total: 2.2 km^{2} (0.85 sq mi)

Population (2021)
  - Total: 241
  - Density: 110/km^{2} (280/sq mi)
- Time zone: UTC+1 (CET)
  - Summer (DST): UTC+2 (CEST)
- Postal code: 40323 Prelog

Donji Pustakovec (Hungarian: Alsópusztafa) is a village in Međimurje County, Croatia.

The village is part of the municipality of Donji Kraljevec and had a population of 286 in the 2011 census. It is connected with the village of Sveti Juraj u Trnju. The D3 state road passes through both villages, which are located around 15 kilometres south-east of Čakovec, the county seat and largest city of Međimurje County.
