= Hodošan =

- Village
- Location within Croatia
- Coordinates: 46°23′42″N 16°38′38″E
- Country: Croatia
- County: Međimurje
- Municipality: Donji Kraljevec

Area
  - Total: 10.8 km^{2} (4.2 sq mi)

Population (2021)
  - Total: 1,063
  - Density: 98.4/km^{2} (255/sq mi)
- Time zone: UTC+1 (CET)
  - Summer (DST): UTC+2 (CEST)
- Postal code: 40320 Donji Kraljevec
- Area code: 040

Hodošan (Hungarian: Hodosány) is a village in Međimurje County, Croatia.

The village is part of the Donji Kraljevec municipality. It is located around 18 kilometres from the centre of Čakovec, the county seat of Međimurje County, with the nearby villages including Donji Hrašćan and Goričan. The town of Prelog is located just over 6 kilometres from the village. The population of Hodošan in the 2011 census was 1,254.

The D3 state road goes through the village. A portion of the A4 motorway also passes through nearby, and the motorway can be accessed around 2 kilometres from the village. The Croatian-Hungarian border checkpoint between Goričan and Letenye is located around 5 kilometres from the village.
