= Nagyhalász =

- Town
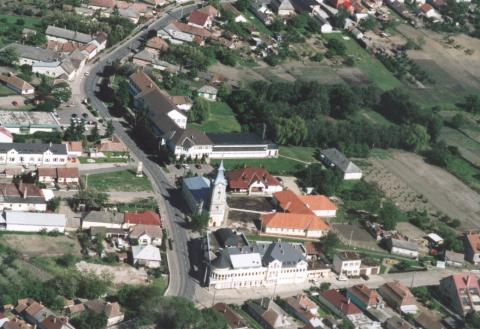

- Flag Coat of arms

- Location within Hungary
- Coordinates: 48°08′N 21°46′E
- Country: Hungary
- County: Szabolcs-Szatmár-Bereg

Area
  - Total: 44.34 km^{2} (17.12 sq mi)

Population (2015)
  - Total: 5,676
  - Density: 128.1/km^{2} (332/sq mi)
- Time zone: UTC+1 (CET)
  - Summer (DST): UTC+2 (CEST)
- Postal code: 4485
- Area code: 42

Nagyhalász is a town in Szabolcs-Szatmár-Bereg county, in the Northern Great Plain region of eastern Hungary.

== Geography ==
It covers an area of 44.34 km^{2} (17 sq mi) and has a population of 5676 people (2015).

== Sport ==
The Nagyhalász Speedway Ring is a motorcycle speedway track, located approximately 1 kilometre west of Nagyhalász on the Rétköz u road. The stadium opened in 2015 and is a significant venue for speedway and has hosted many events, including the 2022 Speedway Grand Prix Qualification and the 2023 Speedway Grand Prix Qualification rounds.
