= Sveti Juraj u Trnju =

- Village
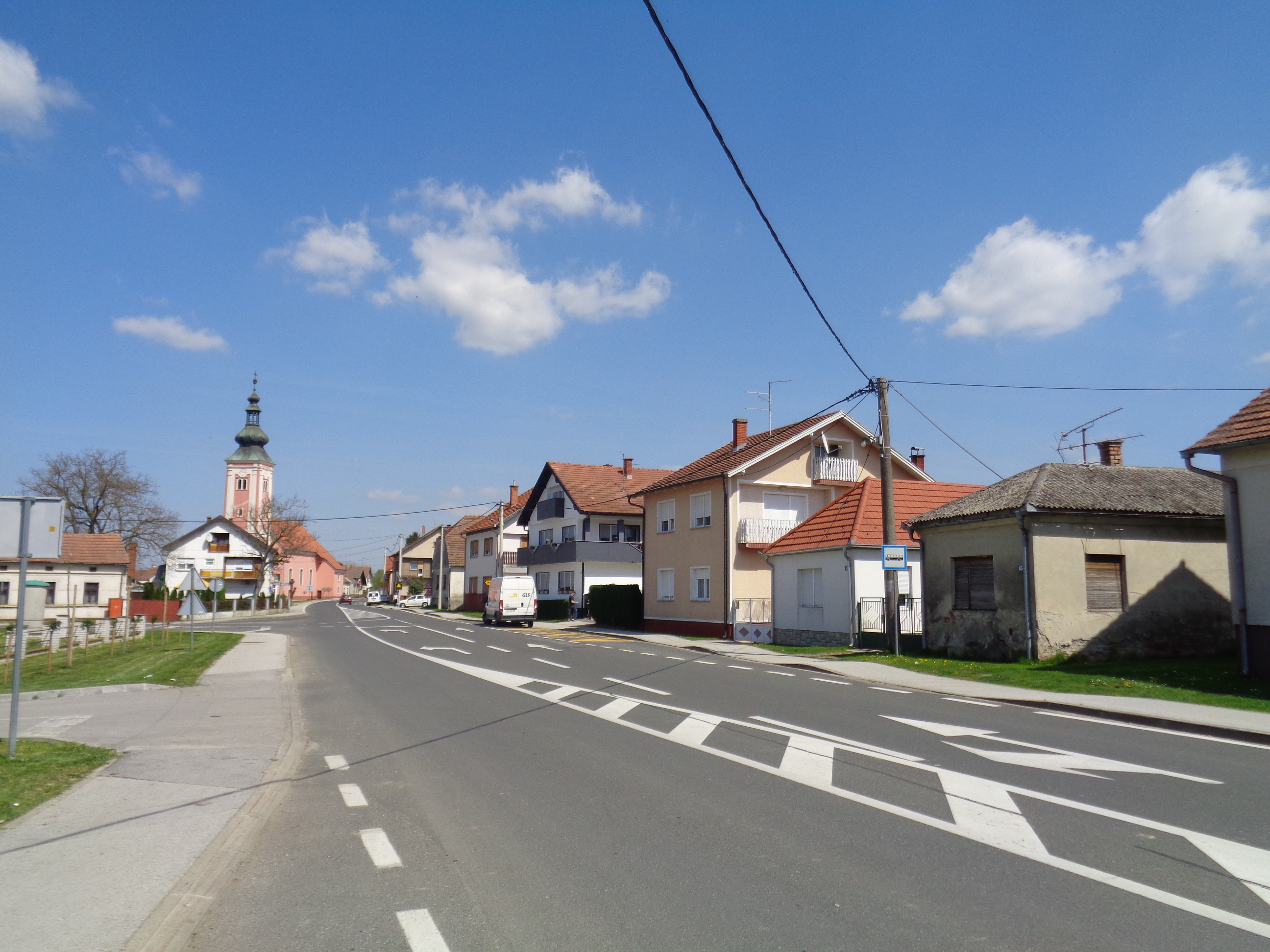
- Village centre

- Location within Croatia
- Coordinates: 46°22′48″N 16°36′47″E
- Country: Croatia
- County: Međimurje County
- Municipality: Donji Kraljevec

Area
  - Total: 1.1 km^{2} (0.42 sq mi)

Population (2021)
  - Total: 282
  - Density: 260/km^{2} (660/sq mi)
- Time zone: UTC+1 (CET)
  - Summer (DST): UTC+2 (CEST)
- Postal code: 40323 Prelog

Sveti Juraj u Trnju (Hungarian: Tüskeszentgyörgy) is a village in Međimurje County, Croatia.

The village is part of the municipality of Donji Kraljevec and had a population of 300 in the 2011 census. It is connected with the village of Donji Pustakovec. The D3 state road passes through both villages, which are located around 15 kilometres east of Čakovec, the county seat and largest city of Međimurje County.

== History ==
Sveti Juraj u Trnju is a village located in Međimurje County, Croatia. Archaeological excavations at the present-day school confirmed that the village was inhabited from at least the 11th century, despite first being mentioned in the 14th century. The parish was first recorded in 1334 in the list of parishes belonging to the Roman Catholic Archdiocese of Zagreb. The first known priest of the parish was a certain Michael in 1501, when the village was called Thwrynyncz. From 1692 onwards, the village was referred to as Trninci in canonical visitations.

While it is probable that Sveti Juraj u Trnju witnessed Ottoman invasions and the rise of Protestantism throughout the 16th and 17th centuries, the only reliable information about that period is records of canonical visitations. However, the oral tradition about that time was later compiled by author Dominik Kolarić in his 1947 book Hrašćanski zapisi (Records from Donji Hrašćan). It is almost certain that the village suffered during the Great Turkish War, as 1688 records mention "cold and empty houses." At that time, all the peasants in the village were farmhands subjected to the Zrinski family.

The village suffered an earthquake in 1738 that destroyed the church, leading to the construction of a new one between 1767 and 1779. The initial mentions of the present church mentioned "clad, but poorly thatched" church. The cemetery was subsequently moved outside of the village during the reign of Joseph II for health reasons in 1779, where it remains today. During the 18th century, Hungarian Pauline Fathers wished to annex Međimurje to Hungary. After the intervention of Gašpar Malečić (prior general of Pauline Fathers monastery in Lepoglava), who ordered parishes across Međimurje to disclose the nationality and the language of their people, Daniel Lengyel (then parish priest) declared that there were no Hungarians in the village and that all the sacraments are done in Croatian. At that time, the village established itself as a horse stable of the Althan counts.

Throughout the 19th century, the village was a subject of Magyarization. During World War I, the village was a subject to heavy requisition from the Austro-Hungarian forces. Discriminatory approach towards the Croatian majority from the Hungarian side, mobilizations, high inflation, war deaths, and constant requisitions caused a revolt among the inhabitants. Between November 2-3, 1918, the inhabitants rebelled by smashing the windows of the village's municipal office, while the property of the wealthy Hungarians in the village was mostly plundered. Hungary responded by sending a heavily armed guard (štatarium), which responded by continuing the practice of martial law, killing several villagers or punishing them by whipping. 1918 occupation of Međimurje by the forces of the State of Slovenes, Croats and Serbs stopped further escalations. In 1932, a volunteer fire department was created.

After interwar stability, the village was once more under occupation during World War II. Shortly after the formation of the Independent State of Croatia, the village was once again occupied by Hungarian forces. On December 3, 1943, after the shooting of a village notary, Pap Jenőj by Partisan forces, the Hungarian forces responded by lining up men in front of the church and threatening to kill them as a revenge. The event was stopped due to the intervention by the village's priest, Mirko Kočila.

In May 1945, the village became part of Yugoslavia. After several territorial reorganizations, the village experienced major infrastructure improvements. The village received electricity in 1954 and asphalt in 1965, as the village became part of a Čakovec-Letenye road. The village's football club NK Trnje experienced success in the 1970s, playing in the fourth tier of Yugoslav football. The history of the football club was briefly documented in a 2018 book written by Božidar Fajić. The village also received a memorial park, commemorating the Partisan victims of World War II. The works were finished in 1988.
