= Stadium Milenium =

Stadium in Goričan, Croatia

- Location: 40320, Donji Kraljevec, Nr Goričan, Croatia
- Coordinates: 46°22′27″N 16°39′35″E
- Capacity: 7,500
- Operator: Motorcycle speedway
- Length: 305 m (0.190 mi)

The Stadium Milenium or Speedway Stadion Milenium is a 7,500-capacity multi-use stadium between Donji Kraljevec and Goričan, Croatia. The stadium has been used as the venue for the World Championship round known as the Speedway Grand Prix of Croatia from 2010 to 2012 and since 2022.

The stadium construction is credited to Yugoslav champion rider Zvonimir Pavlić and the speedway track has a circumference of 305 metres.

The stadium hosted the speedway team Unia Goričan, who competed in the 2006 European Speedway Club Champions' Cup and 2007 European Speedway Club Champions' Cup.

== See also ==
- Speedway Grand Prix of Croatia
