= Donji Kraljevec, Međimurje County =

Donji Kraljevec
- Municipality
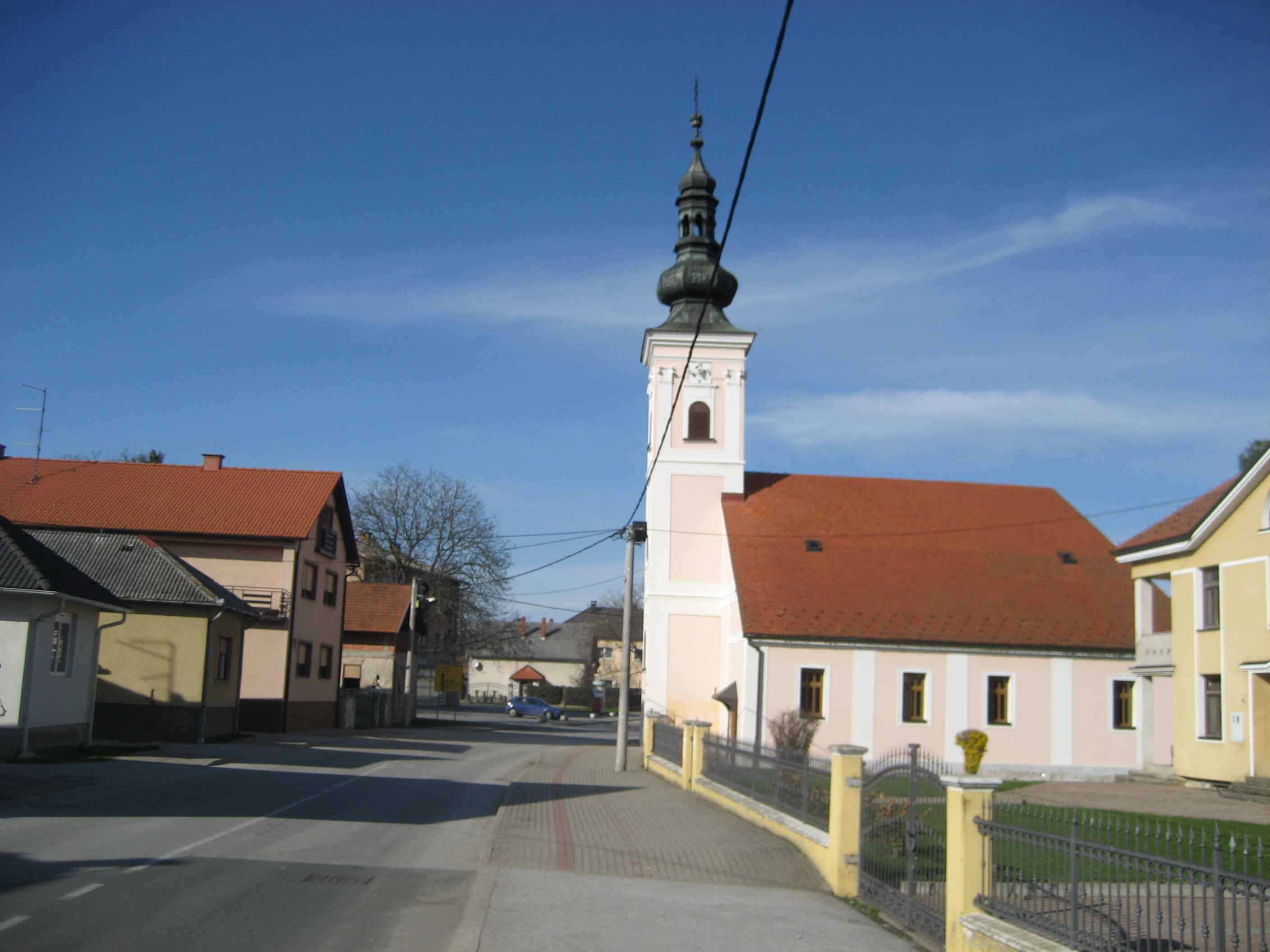
- Village centre
- Interactive map of Donji Kraljevec
- Location within Croatia
- Coordinates: 46°22′N 16°39′E
- Country: Croatia
- Region: Northern Croatia (Međimurje)
- County: Međimurje County

Government
  - Municipal mayor: Miljenko Horvat (NPS)

Area
  - Municipality: 36.3 km^{2} (14.0 sq mi)
  - Urban: 11.5 km^{2} (4.4 sq mi)

Population (2021)
  - Municipality: 4,043
  - Density: 111/km^{2} (288/sq mi)
  - Urban: 1,407
  - Urban density: 122/km^{2} (317/sq mi)
- Time zone: UTC+1 (CET)
  - Summer (DST): UTC+2 (CEST)
- Postal code: 40320 Donji Kraljevec
- Website: donjikraljevec.hr

Donji Kraljevec (Hungarian: Murakirály) is a village and municipality in Međimurje County, Croatia.

== History ==
Donji Kraljevec was first mentioned in 1467 in a list of markets and villages in Međimurje as the property of king Matthias Corvinus. During the rule of the Zrinski family between 1546 and 1691, an administrative system was built in Međimurje. One of the 13 judicatures and courts established at that time had its seat in Donji Kraljevec. At that time, three noblemen owned estates in Donji Kraljevec: Andrija Šoštarić, Juraj Čepeli and Mihael Cvetanić.

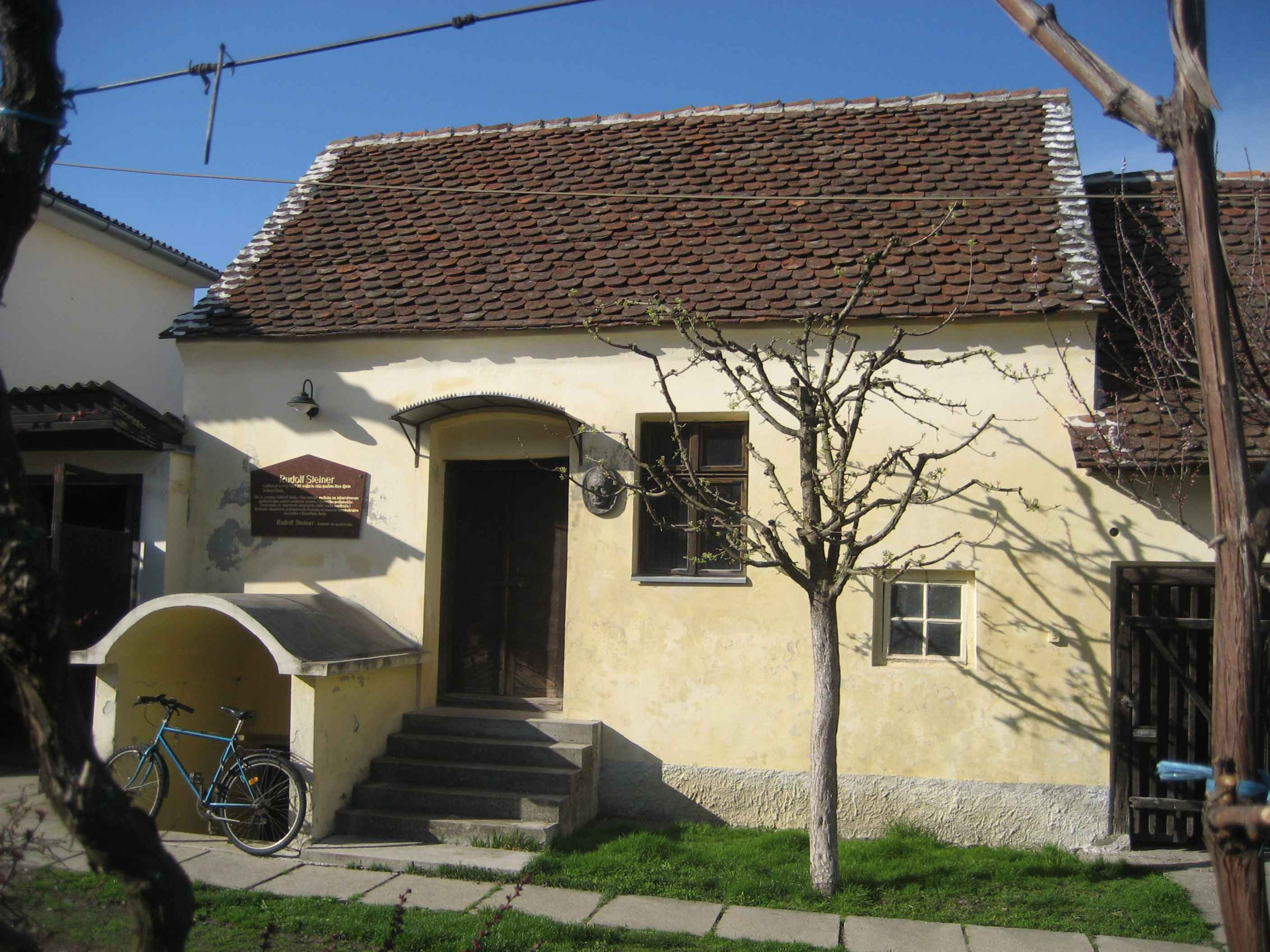
The house where Rudolf Steiner was born in 1861.

In 1857, a railway station was built in Donji Kraljevec, and the first train of the "Southern Railways" (cf. Austrian Southern Railway) passed through the village on April 24, 1860. From 1861 to 1918, Međimurje was under Hungarian administration and was a part of the Hungarian Zala County with its seat in Zalaegerszeg, and in 1871, the administrative and judicial authorities were separated. A fire hit Donji Kraljevec on April 23, 1934, destroying a total of 373 residential and commercial buildings. Over 700 people were left homeless and the damage was estimated at 3 million dinars at the time.

During the Hungarian occupation from 1941 to 1945, there were 8 large municipalities and 21 municipalities in Međimurje in the two districts of Čakovec and Prelog. The municipalities of Donji Kraljevec, Hodošan and Sveti Juraj u Trnju were organized in the area of today's Donji Kraljevec Municipality.

In 1955, the General Law on People's Committees was passed. This law defined local committees as bodies that do not have the character of government, but are responsible for the development of villages, repairs and maintenance of public buildings, streets, green spaces, plantations, electrification and other local needs.

During the Homeland War, the headquarters of the defense of the lower Međimurje region was located in Donji Kraljevec. In addition to members of the former Territorial Defense, the units also included hunters from the area.

== Geography ==
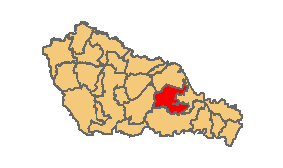
Location within Međimurje County

The village of Donji Kraljevec is located around 20 kilometres south-east of Čakovec, the county seat and largest city of Međimurje County, and just over 4 kilometres north-east of Prelog, the second largest city of the county.

== Demographics ==
In the 2021 census, the municipality had a population of 4,043 in the following settlements:

- Donji Hrašćan, population 420
- Donji Kraljevec, population 1,407
- Donji Pustakovec, population 241
- Hodošan, population 1,063
- Palinovec, population 630
- Sveti Juraj u Trnju, population 282
Donji Kraljevec: Population trends 1857–2021
v

population	3303	3888	4032	4393	4591	5510	5831	5871	6064	5817	5518	5438	5337	5313	4931	4659	4043
	1857	1869	1880	1890	1900	1910	1921	1931	1948	1953	1961	1971	1981	1991	2001	2011	2021

Sources: Croatian Bureau of Statistics publications

== Administration ==
The current mayor of Donji Kraljevec is Miljenko Horvat (NPS) and the Donji Kraljevec Municipal Council consists of 13 seats.

Groups	Councilors per group
NPS	7 / 13
HDZ	4 / 13
SDP-MDS	3 / 13

== Sport ==
The nearby Stadium Milenium is a speedway stadium and hosts the Speedway Grand Prix of Croatia.

== Notable people ==
- Rudolf Steiner - Austrian philosopher
