= Goričan =

- Municipality
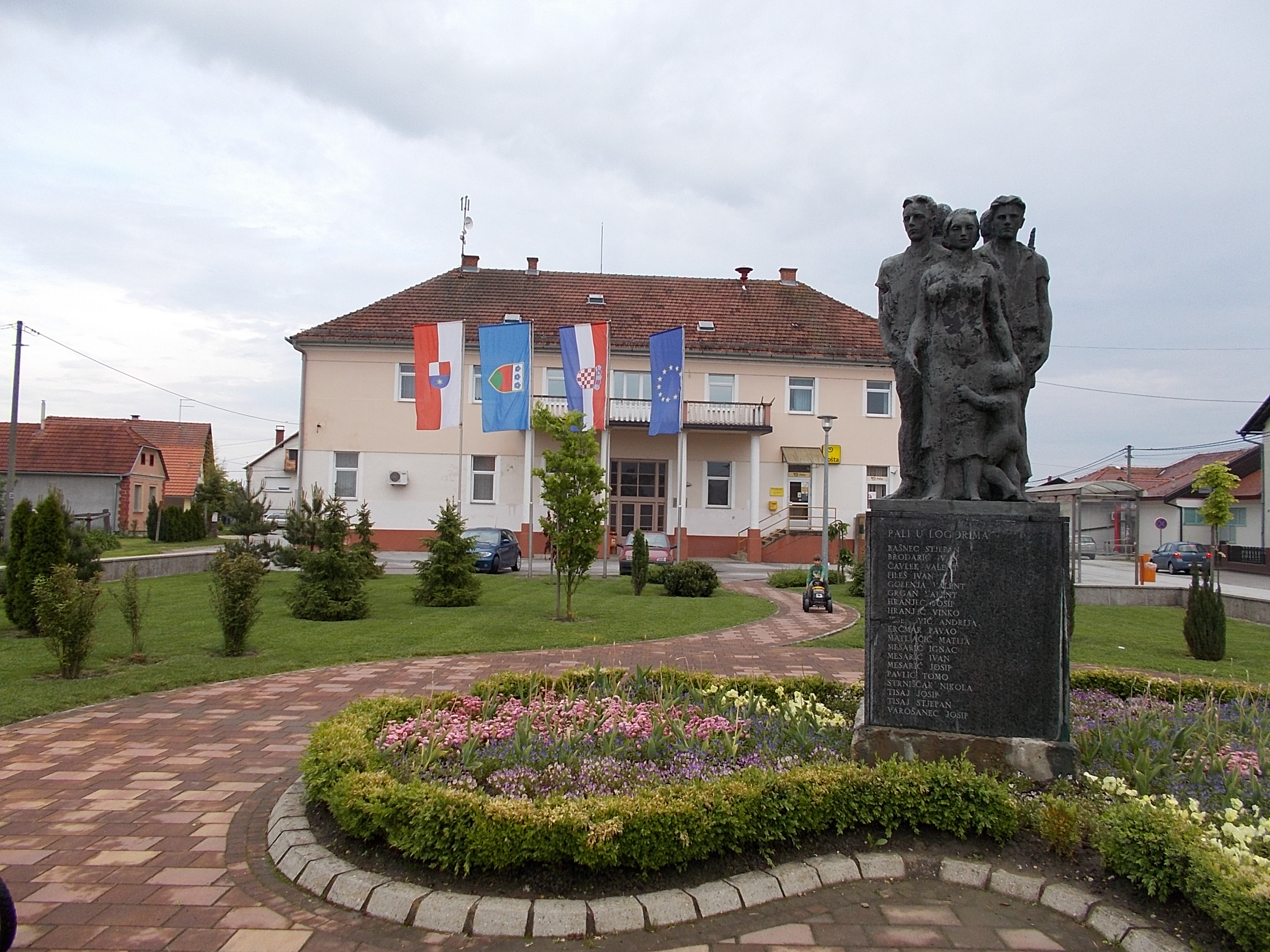

- Location within Croatia
- Coordinates: 46°23′N 16°41′E
- Country: Croatia
- Region: Northern Croatia (Međimurje)
- County: Međimurje County

Government
  - Municipal mayor: Emanuel Sinković (HDZ)

Area
  - Municipality: 21.7 km^{2} (8.4 sq mi)
  - Urban: 21.7 km^{2} (8.4 sq mi)

Population (2021)
  - Municipality: 2,343
  - Density: 108/km^{2} (280/sq mi)
  - Urban: 2,343
  - Urban density: 108/km^{2} (280/sq mi)
- Time zone: UTC+1 (CET)
  - Summer (DST): UTC+2 (CEST)
- Postal code: 40324 Goričan
- Area code: 040
- Website: gorican.hr

Goričan (Hungarian: Muracsány) is a municipality in Međimurje County, Croatia.

== History ==
Tumuli - graves from the Iron Age, dated between the 7th and 4th centuries BC, have been found in the area of the Goričan municipality. Goričan was first mentioned in 1255 under the name Kerechen.

During the rule of the Zrinski family, Goričan was the seat of a lordship (vojvodat). The Goričan lordship included the village of Hodošan and the abandoned village of Đurđijanec. Until 1691, Goričan was in the possession of Adam Zrinski, when that part of Međimurje came under the administration of the royal chamber. In 1770, the Chapel of St. Leonard was built, which would become a parish church in 1789. In 1838, a school building with a home for teachers was built.

=== Goričan Republic ===
On October 29th, 1918, the Croatian Sabor proclaimed the State of Slovenes, Croats and Serbs whose northern border was the river Drava. This meant that Međimurje, including Goričan, was left out of the new state and was under the administration of Hungary. On November 2, 1918, the residents of Goričan, dissatisfied with the Hungarian administration, stormed the municipal offices and expelled the municipal government, declaring Goričan an independent republic. 1 person, Franjo Tisaj, was killed in the fighting. On November 16, Hungarian troops arrived in the village and put down the rebellion, killing 4 people.

== Geography ==
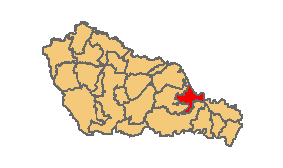
Location within Međimurje County

Goričan is located in the eastern part of Međimurje County, near the Croatian-Hungarian border and the Mura. The nearby populated places include the villages of Donji Kraljevec and Hodošan in Međimurje County, as well as the town of Letenye in Hungary. The border checkpoint between Goričan and Letenye is located around 3 kilometres from the centre of the village. The border checkpoint is also the place where the Croatian A4 motorway becomes the Hungarian M7 motorway, or the other way around.

== Demographics ==
According to the 2021 census, the Goričan municipality had a total population of 2,343. Goričan is the only village in the municipality.

Goričan: Population trends 1857–2021
v

population	2342	2736	2880	3202	3400	4086	4157	4121	4418	4266	3847	3696	3256	3221	3148	2823	2343
	1857	1869	1880	1890	1900	1910	1921	1931	1948	1953	1961	1971	1981	1991	2001	2011	2021

Sources: Croatian Bureau of Statistics publications

== Administration ==
The current mayor of Goričan is Emanuel Sinković (HDZ) and the Goričan Municipal Council consists of 9 seats.

Groups	Councilors per group
HDZ	7 / 9
NPS-SDP-HSLS	2 / 9

== Sport ==
The nearby Stadium Milenium is a speedway stadium and hosts the Speedway Grand Prix of Croatia.

== Gallery ==
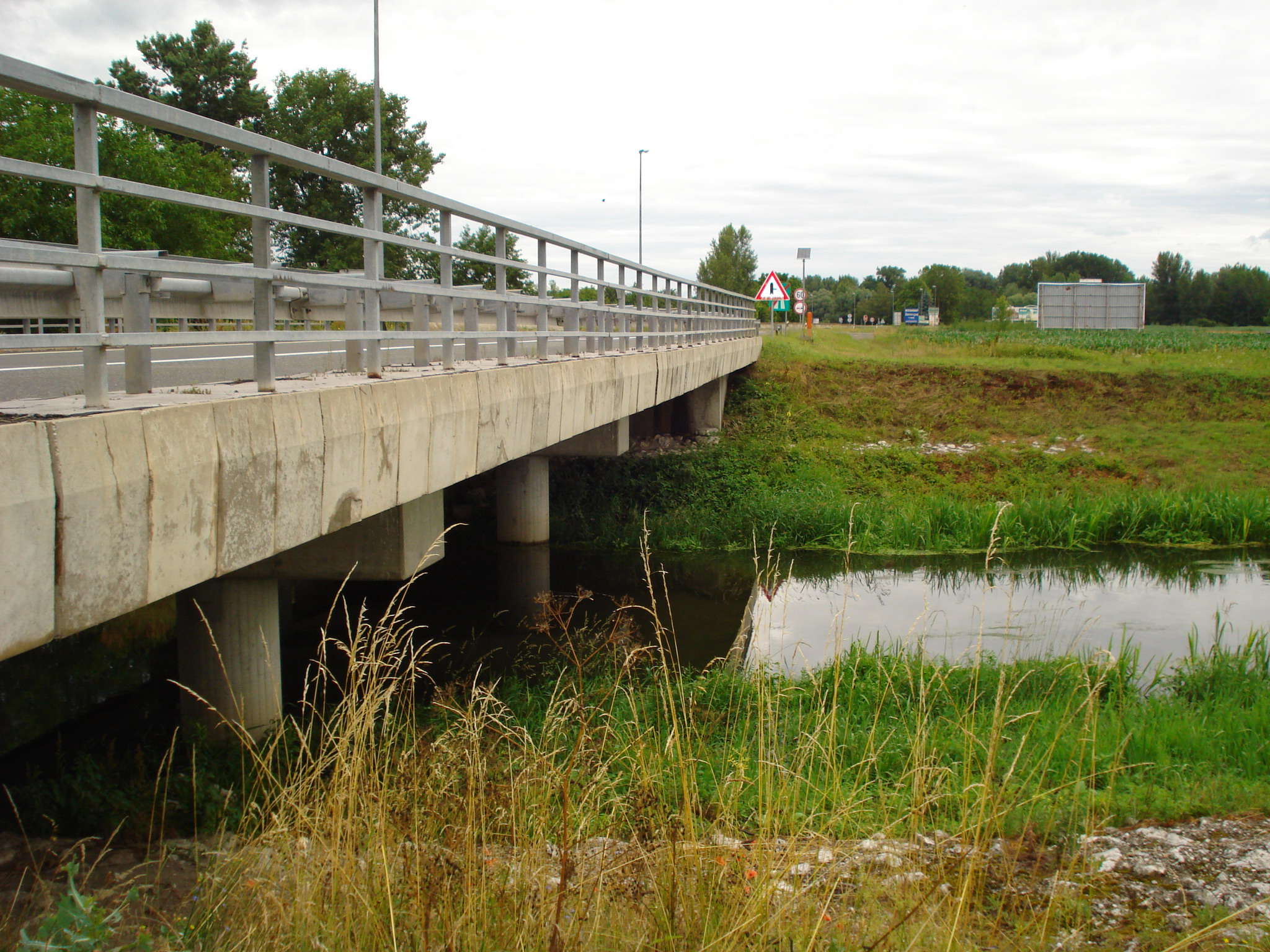
A bridge over the Trnava River

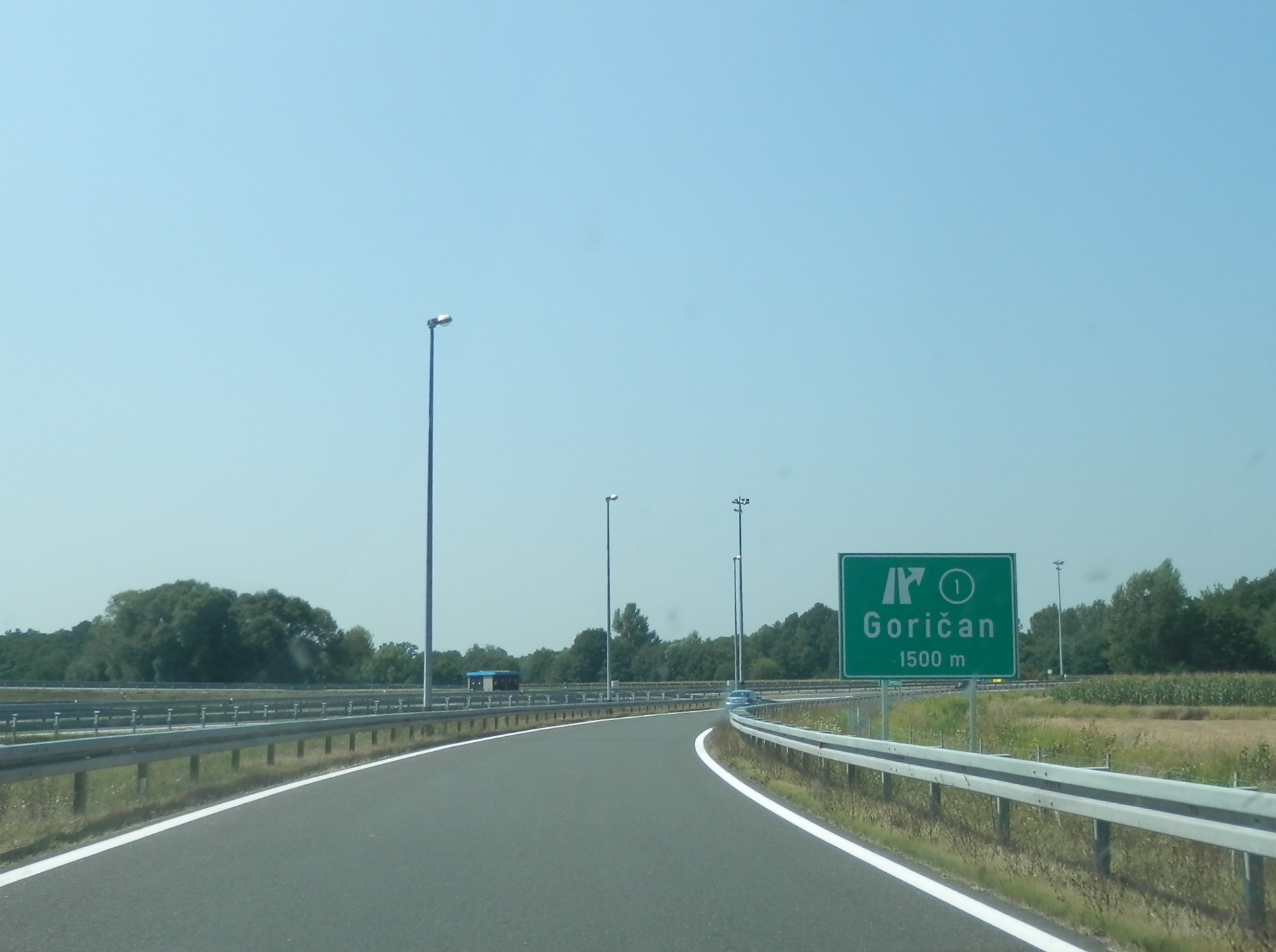
A4 Highway near Goričan

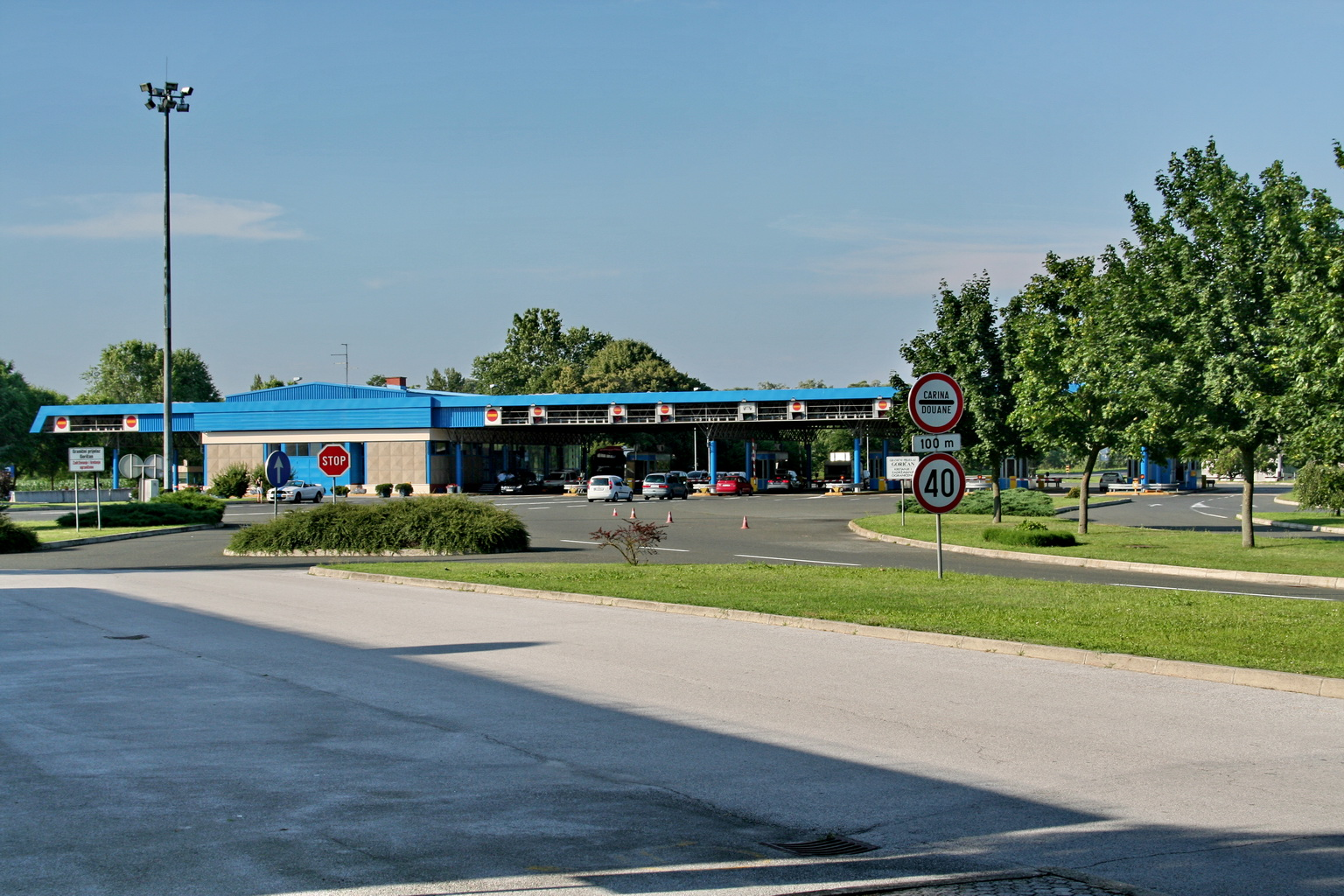
Border crossing with Hungary

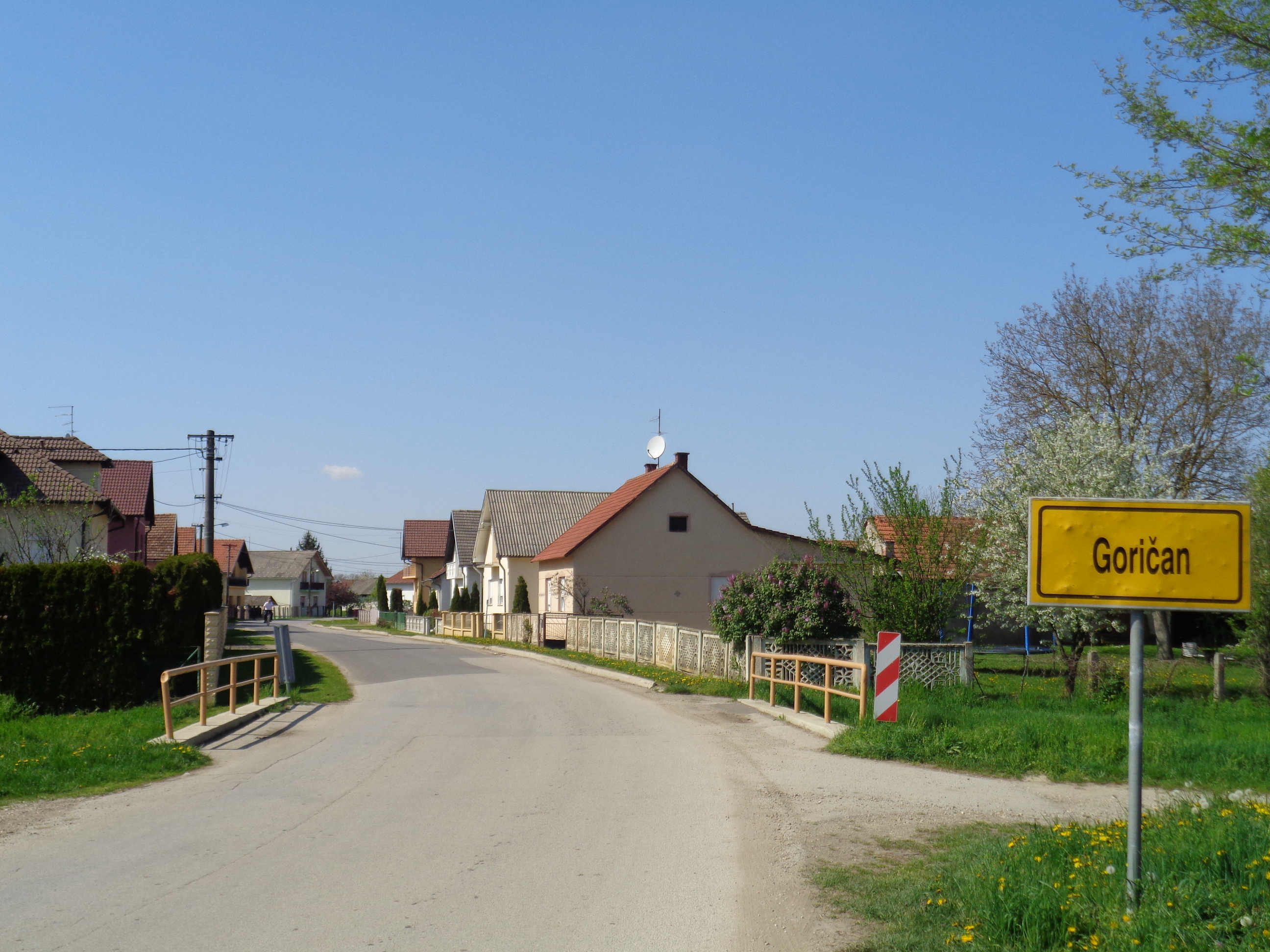
Village entrance

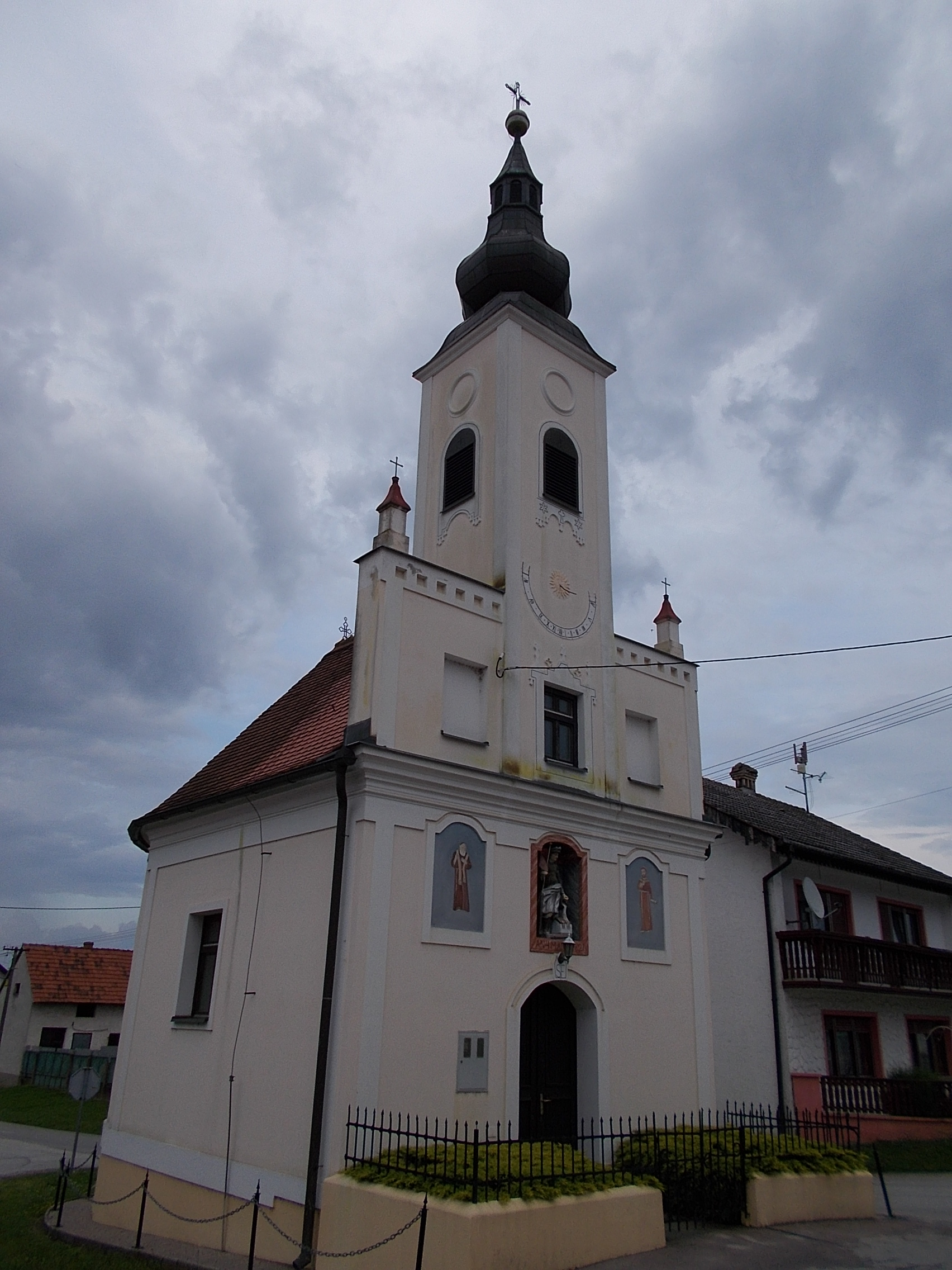
Chapel of Saint Florian

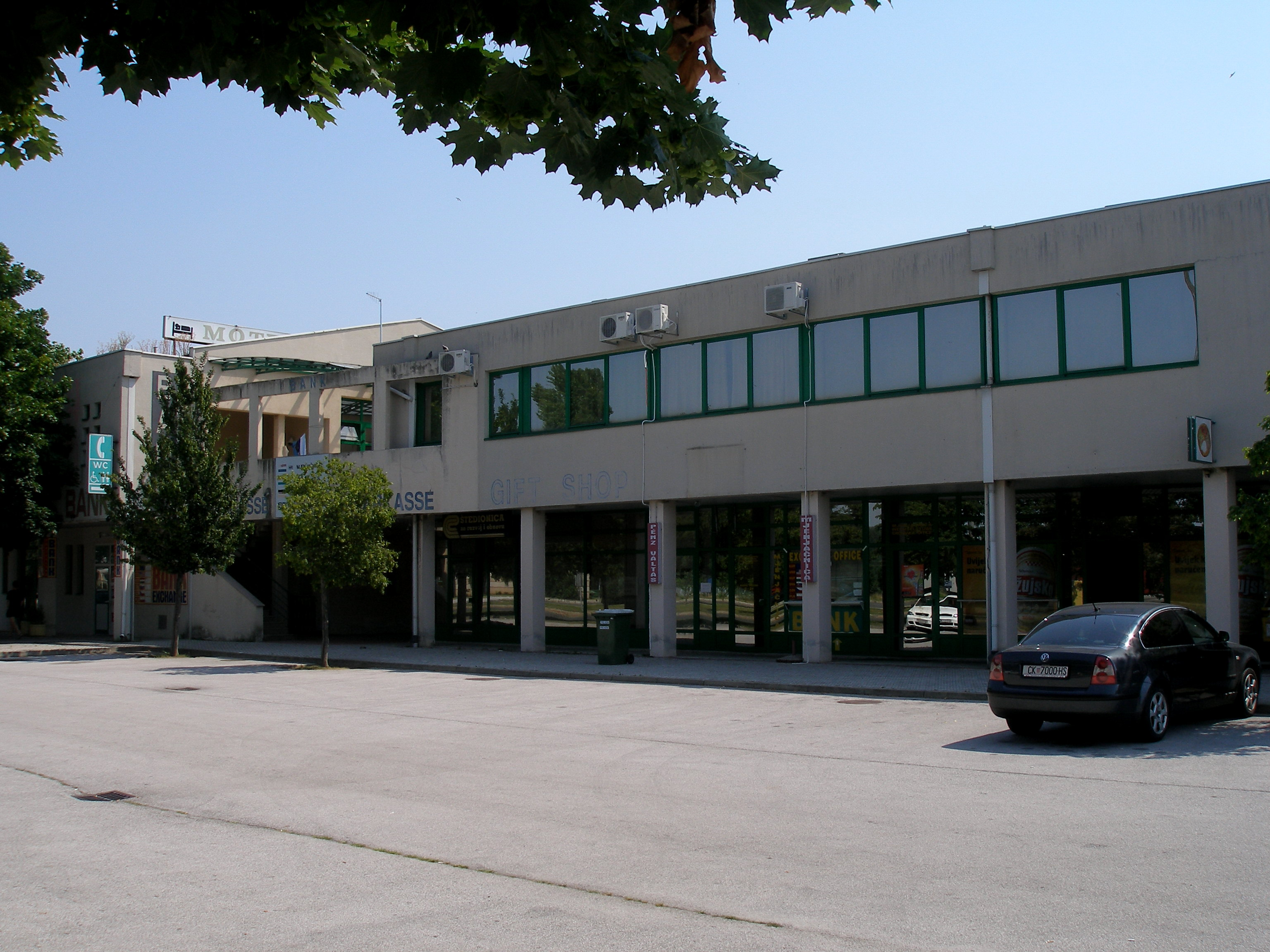
Motel

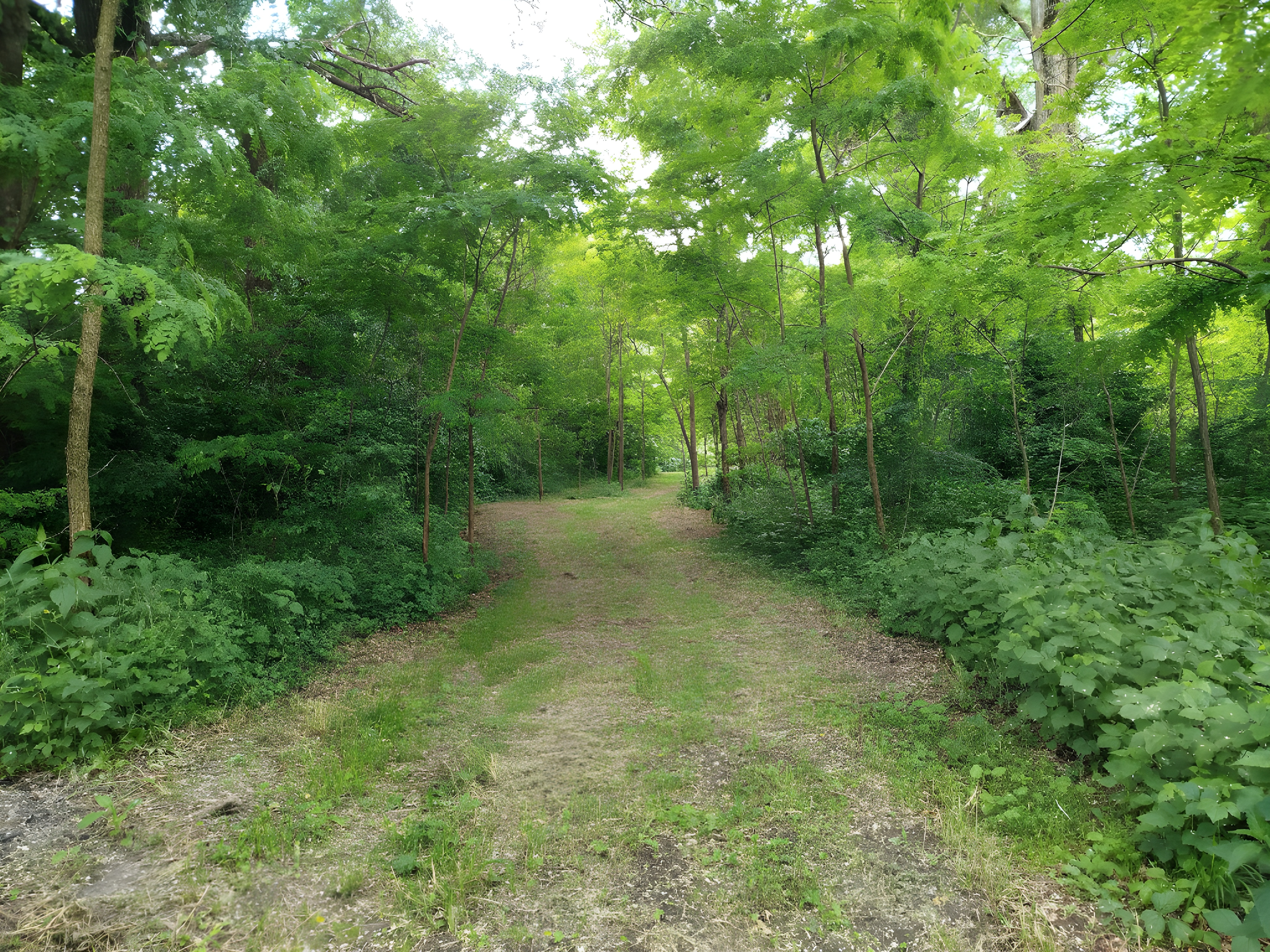
Forest near Goričan
