= Paweł Przedpełski =

Polish speedway rider

- Born: 23 June 1995 (age 31); Toruń, Poland
- Nationality: Polish

Career history

Poland
- 2013–2018, 2021–2024: Toruń
- 2019–2020: Częstochowa
- 2025: Rzeszów

Great Britain
- 2017: Leicester

Sweden
- 2014–2016: Smederna
- 2019, 2023–2024: Piraterna
- 2018, 2020, 2025: Dackarna
- 2021–2022: Västervik

Denmark
- 2025: Slangerup

Individual honours
- 2021: GP Challenge winner

Team honours
- 2025: Danish league champion

Paweł Przedpełski (born 23 June 1995) is a speedway rider from Poland.

== Speedway career ==
Przedpełski rode in the top tier of British Speedway riding for the Leicester Lions in the SGB Premiership 2017. He currently rides for Apator Toruń in Poland. He is three times winner of the Team Speedway Junior World Championship in 2014, 2015 and 2016.

In August 2021, during the Speedway Grand Prix Qualification he won the GP Challenge, which ensured that he claimed a permanent slot for the 2022 Speedway Grand Prix.

Przedpełski finished in 15th place during the 2022 Speedway World Championship, after securing 29 points during the 2022 Speedway Grand Prix. The 15th place finish resulted in him losing his place for the 2023 Speedway Grand Prix.

In August 2024, Przedpełski transferred from KS Toruń to Stal Rzeszów in the Team Speedway Polish Championship.

During the 2025 Danish speedway season, he helped Slangerup retain the Speedway Ligaen title

== Major results ==
=== World individual Championship ===
- 2014 Speedway Grand Prix 27th
- 2016 Speedway Grand Prix 17th
- 2017 Speedway Grand Prix 19th
- 2021 Speedway Grand Prix 17th
- 2022 Speedway Grand Prix - 15th
