= 2015 Danish speedway season =

Season of speedway in Denmark

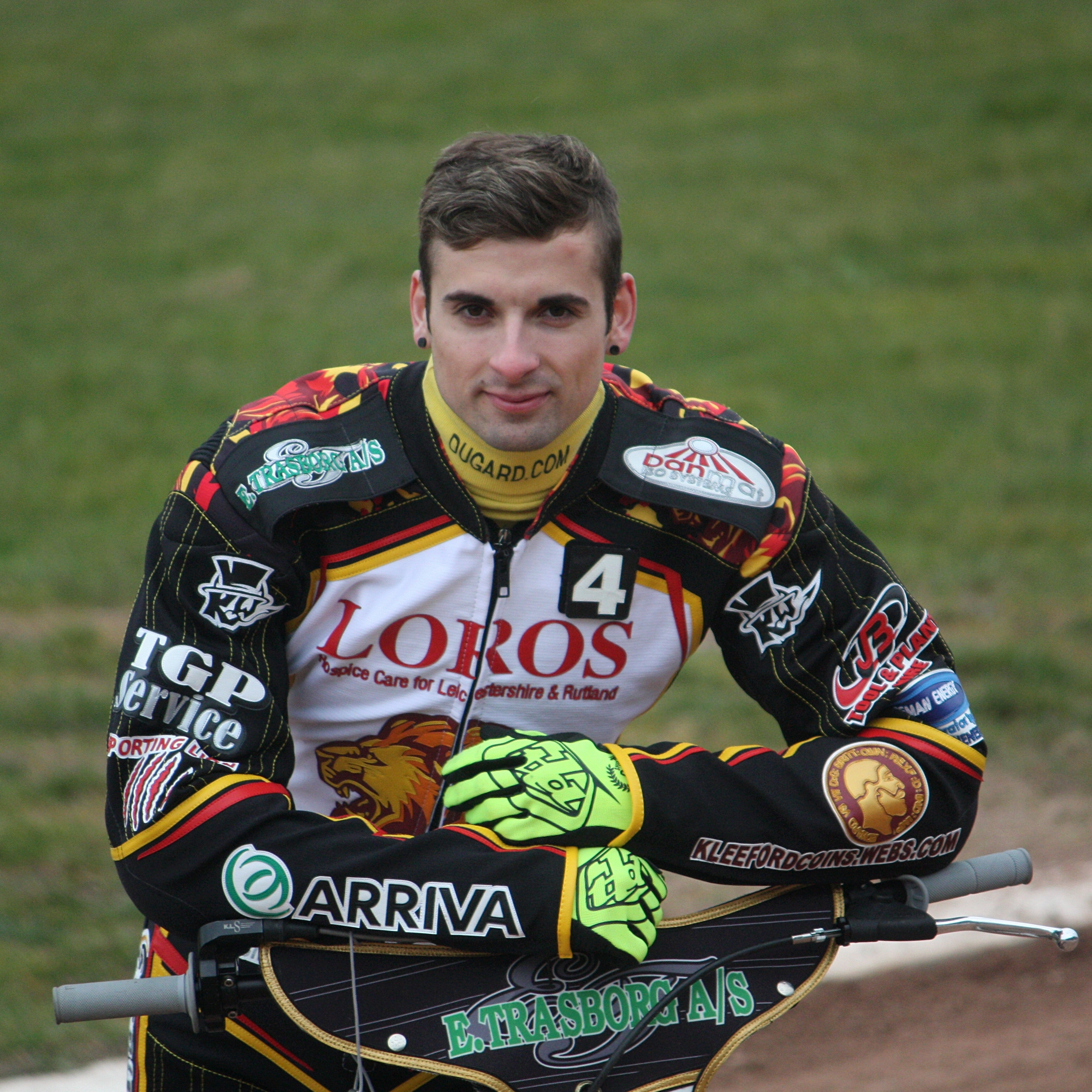
- Mikkel Michelsen, 2015 Danish U21 champion

== Individual ==
=== Individual Championship ===
The 2015 Danish Individual Speedway Championship was the 2015 edition of the Danish Individual Speedway Championship. The final was staged over a single round, at Slangerup and was won by Niels Kristian Iversen. It was the fourth time Iversen had won the national title, having also been victorious in 2012, 2013 and 2014.

Each rider competed in five rides, with the four top scorers racing in an additional heat. The points from the additional heat were then added to the previous score from the five riders. The winner was the rider who accumulated the most points in all of their rides, and not the rider who won the additional heat.

Final

- 21 August 2015, held at Slangerup

Pos.	Rider	Points	Details
1	Niels Kristian Iversen (Esbjerg)	15	(3,2,3,2,3+2)
2	Nicki Pedersen (Holsted)	14	(3,3,3,2,2+1)
3	Hans N. Andersen (Munkebo)	13	(2,2,3,0,3+3)
4	Patrick Hougaard (Fjelsted)	11	(3,3,3,1,1+0)
5	Mikkel Bech Jensen (Glumso)	10	(2,2,W,3,3)
6	Mikkel Michelsen (Slangerup)	9	(0,3,1,3,2)
7	Kenni Larsen (Munkebo)	9	(1,3,2,3,W)
8	Anders Thomsen (Fjelsted)	9	(1,2,2,2,2)
9	Mads Korneliussen (Region Varde)	7	(1,1,1,1,3)
10	Michael Jepsen Jensen (Grindsted)	7	(2,1,1,2,1)
11	René Bach (Esbjerg)	6	(2,0,2,0,2)
12	Kenneth Hansen (Slangerup)	5	(0,1,0,3,1)
13	Jesper B. Monberg (Esbjerg)	4	(0,1,2,1,0)
14	Kenni Nissen (Slangerup)	3	(3,0,0,0,0)
15	Nikolaj Busk Jakobsen (Fjelsted)	3	(T,0,1,1,1)
16	Jesper Scharff (Munkebo)	1	(1,0,0,0,0)
17	Mark Beyer (Fjelsted)	0	(0,-,-,-,-)
18	Simon Selch (Slangerup)	DNS	

=== U21 Championship ===
Mikkel Michelsen won the U21 Championship for the second time. The final was held at Brovst on the 5 September.

Pos.	Rider	Points
1	Mikkel Michelsen	15+3
2	Mikkel Bech	13+2
3	Anders Thomsen	12+1
4	Nikolaj Busk Jakobsen	13+0
5	Emil Grøndal	9
6	Kenni Nissen	9
7	Kasper Lykke Nielsen	9
8	Jonas Jeppesen	7
9	Patrick Hansen	7
10	Kasper Andersen	5
11	Sam Jensen	5
12	Frederik Jakobsen	5
13	Mikkel B. Andersen	4
14	Jesper Scharff	4
15	Emil Engstrøm	2
16	Mark Beyer	1
17	Mikkel Salomonsen	0

== Team ==
=== Danish Speedway League ===
The Danish Speedway League was won by Munkebo Speedway Club for the first time.

Pos	Team	P	W	D	L	Pts	BP	Total
1	Munkebo	14	11	0	3	22	5	27
2	Esbjerg Vikings	14	9	0	5	18	7	25
3	Fjelsted	14	9	1	4	19	4	23
4	Region Varde	14	9	0	5	18	4	22
5	Holstebro	14	6	1	7	13	4	17
6	Holsted Tigers	14	5	0	9	10	2	12
7	Slangerup	14	3	0	11	6	2	8
8	Grindsted	14	3	0	11	6	0	6

Super Final

Pos	Team	Pts	Riders
1	Munkebo	36	H Andersen 14, Thomsen 9, Scharff 6, Lahti 4, Biełousown 3
2	Fjelsted	33	Kildemand 12, Jakobsen 9, Hansen 5, Covatti 4, Hougaard 3
3	Esbjerg	32	Iversen 10, Bech 9, Bach 7, Palm Toft 2, S Nielsen 5
4	Region Varde	31	Korneliussen 9, Fricke 8, North 8, Thyme 4, JB Andersen 2

=== Teams ===
Munkebo

- (Denmark) Hans Andersen
- (Denmark) Anders Thomsen
- (Denmark) Kenni Larsen
- (Denmark) Lasse Bjerre
- (England) Danny King
- (Russia) Witalij Biełousow
- (Finland) Timo Lahti
- (Australia) Nick Morris
- (Sweden) Mathias Thörnblom
- (Denmark) Jesper Scharff

Fjelsted

- (Denmark) Patrick Hougaard
- (Denmark) Nikolaj Busk Jakobsen
- (Denmark) Peter Kildemand
- (Denmark) Ulrich Ostergaard
- (Italy) Nicolas Covatti
- (Denmark) Patrick Hansen
- (Australia) Troy Batchelor
- (Denmark) Nicki Barrett
- (Denmark) Frederik Jakobsen
- (Poland) Daniel Kaczmarek
- (Denmark) Henning Bager

Esbjerg

- (Denmark) Niels Kristian Iversen
- (Denmark) Mikkel Bech
- (Denmark) René Bach
- (Denmark) Jesper B. Monberg
- (Denmark) Michael Palm Toft
- (Denmark) Simon Nielsen
- (Poland) Kamil Pulczyński
- (Denmark) Jonas Jensen
- (Denmark) Jacob Bukhave
- (Denmark) Patrick Josefsen
- (Poland) Zbigniew Suchecki
- (Russia) Artem Laguta

Region Varde

- (Denmark) Mads Korneliussen
- (Australia) Max Fricke
- (Australia) Sam Masters
- (Denmark) Jonas Andersen
- (Finland) Joonas Kylmakorpi
- (Denmark) Michael Thyme
- (Australia) Dakota North
- (Denmark) Tobias Thomsen
- (Australia) Jason Doyle
- (Poland) Tomasz Gapiński

Holstebro

- (Denmark) Bjarne Pedersen
- (Poland) Adrian Gomolski
- (Denmark) Jesper B. Monberg
- (Denmark) Thomas Jorgensen
- (Denmark) Mikkel B. Andersen
- (Ukraine) Andriej Karpov
- (Russia) Andrey Kudriashov
- (Slovenia) Ziga Kovacic

Holsted

- (Denmark) Nicki Pedersen
- (Denmark) Rasmus Jensen
- (Denmark) Kasper Lykke Nielsen
- (Denmark) Nicolai Klindt
- (Denmark) Bjarne Pedersen
- (Denmark) Martin Steen Hansen
- (Poland) Damian Balinski
- (Czech Republic) Josef Franc
- (Poland) Sam Jensen
- (Poland) Dawid Lampart
- (Denmark) Jonas Jeppesen
- (Denmark) Nicklas Porsing

Slangerup

- (Denmark) Kenneth Kruse Hansen
- (Denmark) Mikkel Michelsen
- (Denmark) Leon Madsen
- (Denmark) Andreas Lyager
- (Denmark) Simon Selch
- (Denmark) Kenni Nissen
- (Denmark) Jesper Søgaard-Kristiansen
- (Poland) Simon Nielsen

Grindsted

- (Denmark) Michael Jepsen Jensen
- (Poland) Miroslaw Jablonski
- (Poland) Krystian Rempala
- (Denmark) Emil Grondal
- (Denmark) Johannes Kikkenborg
- (Poland) Krystian Pieszczek
- (Norway) Lasse Fredriksen
- (Poland) Kacper Gomolski
- (Finland) Nike Lunna
- (Denmark) Morten Risager
