= 2016 Danish speedway season =

Season of speedway in Denmark

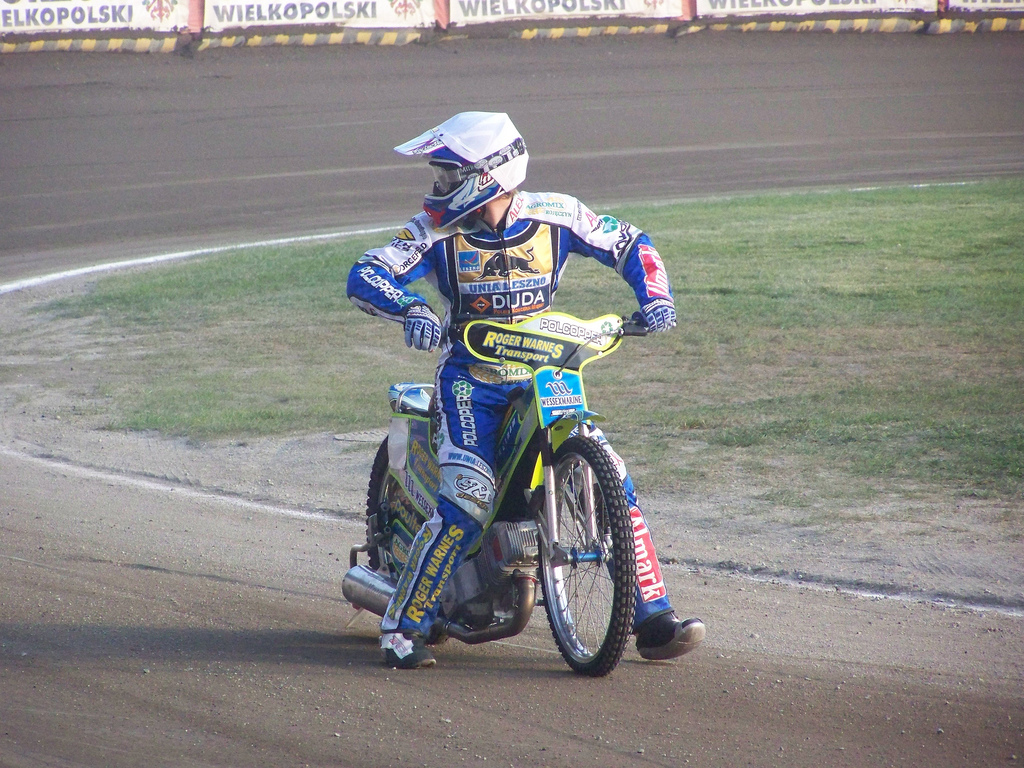
- Australian Troy Batchelor helped Region Varde win the league title.

== Individual ==
=== Individual Championship ===
The 2016 Danish Individual Speedway Championship was the 2016 edition of the Danish Individual Speedway Championship. The final was staged over a single round, at Holsted. For the fifth year in a row, the title was won by Niels Kristian Iversen, who beat Kenneth Bjerre, Nicki Pedersen and Nicolai Klindt. It was the first time the title had been won by the same rider for five successive years since 1971, when Ole Olsen managed the feat.

Each rider competed in five rides, with the four top scorers racing in an additional heat. The points from the additional heat were then added to the previous score from the five riders. The winner was the rider who accumulated the most points in all of their rides, and not the rider who won the additional heat.

Final

- 4 June 2016, held at Holsted

Pos.	Rider	Points	Details
1	Niels Kristian Iversen (Esbjerg)	15	(3,2,2,3,2+3)
2	Kenneth Bjerre (Holstebro)	14	(2,2,3,3,3+1)
3	Nicki Pedersen (Holsted)	13	(3,2,2,2,2+2)
4	Nicolai Klindt (Grindsted)	10	(3,3,1,0,3+0)
5	Bjarne Pedersen (Holsted)	10	(2,3,2,1,2)
6	Lasse Bjerre (Holstebro)	9	(2,2,1,3,1)
7	Hans N. Andersen (Munkebo)	8	(W,1,3,3,1)
8	Rasmus Jensen (Holsted)	8	(1,W,2,2,3)
9	Mikkel Bech Jensen (Glumso)	7	(D,1,3,3,W)
10	René Bach (Esbjerg)	7	(1,1,3,1,1)
11	Mads Korneliussen (Region Varde)	6	(3,3,0,0,0)
12	Patrick Hougaard (Fjelsted)	6	(1,0,3,2,0)
13	Peter Kildemand (Fjelsted)	4	(0,0,0,2,2)
14	Michael Jepsen Jensen (Grindsted)	4	(0,1,1,1,1)
15	Ulrich Østergaard (Munkebo)	2	(2,W,0,0,0)
16	Claus Vissing (Fjelsted)	2	(1,W,0,0,1)
	Kenni Nissen (Slangerup)	DNS	
	Jesper Scharff (Munkebo)	DNS	

=== U21 Championship ===
Jonas Jeppesen won the U21 Championship at Holstebro on 25 September.

Pos.	Rider	Points
1	Jonas Jeppesen	11+3
2	Andreas Lyager	14+0
3	Mikkel B. Andersen	11+2
4	Jonas Seifert-Salk	11+1
5	Emil Grøndal	10
6	Tim Sørensen	10
7	Kasper Andersen	9
8	Jason Jorgensen	9
9	Martin Steen Hansen	8
10	Frederik Jakobsen	8
11	Christian Thaysen	6
12	Patrick Hansen	5
13	Mark Beyer	3
14	Michael Thyme	3
15	Jonas Jensen	1
16	Emil Pørtner	1
17	Emil Engstrøm	0

== Team ==
=== Danish Speedway League ===
The Danish Speedway League was won by Region Varde for the fourth time, but first known by the name of Region Varde.

Pos	Team	P	W	D	L	Pts	BP	Total
1	Region Varde	14	10	0	4	20	7	27
2	Holsted Tigers	14	9	0	5	18	4	22
3	Esbjerg Vikings	14	9	0	5	18	4	22
4	Slangerup	14	7	0	7	14	5	19
5	Fjelsted	14	7	1	6	15	4	19
6	Grindsted	14	5	1	8	11	2	13
7	Munkebo	14	5	0	9	10	1	11
8	Holstebro	14	3	0	11	6	1	7

Semi Final

Pos	Team	Pts
1	Esbjerg	42
2	Slangerup	35
3	Grindsted	31
4	Fjelsted	27

Super Final

Pos	Team	Pts	Riders
1	Region Varde	40	Batchelor 12, Korneliussen 10, Masters 9, MB Andersen 6, JB Andersen 3
2	Holsted	37	Bjarne Pedersen 9, R Jensen 9, N Pedersen 8, Lykke Nielsen 6, Jeppesen 5
3	Esbjerg	35	Iversen 16, Bech 8, Bach 8, Hansen 2, Søgaard-K 1
4	Slangerup	20	Hansen 7, Lyager 5, Jepsen Jensen 4, Michelsen 4, Lunna 0

=== Teams ===
Region Varde

- (Australia) Troy Batchelor
- (Australia) Sam Masters
- (Denmark) Mads Korneliussen
- (Denmark) Mikkel B. Andersen
- (Denmark) Jonas Andersen
- (Australia) Max Fricke
- (Denmark) Tobias Thomsen
- (Denmark) Claus Vissing
- (Finland) Joonas Kylmakorpi

Holsted

- (Denmark) Nicki Pedersen
- (Denmark) Bjarne Pedersen
- (Denmark) Rasmus Jensen
- (Denmark) Martin Steen Hansen
- (Denmark) Jonas Jeppesen
- (Denmark) Kasper Lykke Nielsen
- (Finland) Timo Lahti
- (Poland) Dawid Lampart
- (Sweden) Magnus Zetterstrom

Esbjerg

- (Denmark) Niels Kristian Iversen
- (Denmark) Mikkel Bech
- (Poland) Patryk Dudek
- (Denmark) Patrick Hansen
- (Denmark) René Bach
- (Denmark) Jesper Søgaard-Kristiansen
- (Australia) Brady Kurtz
- (Poland) Tobiasz Musielak
- (Poland) Piotr Protasiewicz

Slangerup

- (Denmark) Kenneth Kruse Hansen
- (Denmark) Michael Jepsen Jensen
- (Denmark) Andreas Lyager
- (Denmark) Mikkel Michelsen
- (Finland) Nike Lunna
- (Denmark) Nicklas Porsing
- (Denmark) Kenni Nissen
- (Australia) Josh Grajczonek
- (Germany) Erik Riss

Fjelsted

- (Denmark) Peter Kildemand
- (Denmark) Patrick Hougaard
- (Poland) Sebastian Ulamek
- (Denmark) Nikolaj Busk Jakobsen
- (Denmark) Frederik Jakobsen
- (Denmark) Morten Risager
- (Poland) Miroslaw Jablonski
- (Poland) Daniel Kaczmarek
- (Latvia) Andžejs Ļebedevs
- (Denmark) Marc Randrup

Grindsted

- (Australia) Jason Doyle
- (Denmark) Nicolai Klindt
- (Poland) Przemyslaw Pawlicki
- (Denmark) Kenneth Kruse Hansen
- (Denmark) Thomas Jørgensen
- (Poland) Krystian Pieszczek
- (Norway) Lasse Fredriksen
- (Poland) Grzegorz Walasek
- (Denmark) Emil Grondal
- (Denmark) Emil Engstrom
- (Poland) Edward Mazur
- (Denmark) Marc Randrup
- (Poland) Kacper Gomolski
- (France) David Bellego

Munkebo

- (Denmark) Hans Andersen
- (Denmark) Anders Thomsen
- (Denmark) Ulrich Ostergaard
- (Denmark) Emil Grondal
- (Denmark) Henning Bager
- (Denmark) Thomas Jorgensen
- (Poland) Robert Miskowiak
- (Sweden) Anders Mellgren
- (Sweden) Pontus Aspgren
- (Denmark) Jason Jorgensen
- (Denmark) Jesper Scharff
- (Denmark) Tim Sørensen
- (Denmark) Kasper Andersen

Holstebro

- (Denmark) Leon Madsen
- (England) Chris Harris
- (Denmark) Lasse Bjerre
- (Denmark) Kenneth Bjerre
- (Russia) Vadim Tarasenko
- (Denmark) Simon Nielsen
- (United States) Ricky Wells
- (Ukraine) Andriej Karpov
- (Denmark) Sam Jensen
- (Denmark) Charlie Gjedde
- (Russia) Andrey Kudriashov
