= 2014 Danish speedway season =

Season of speedway in Denmark

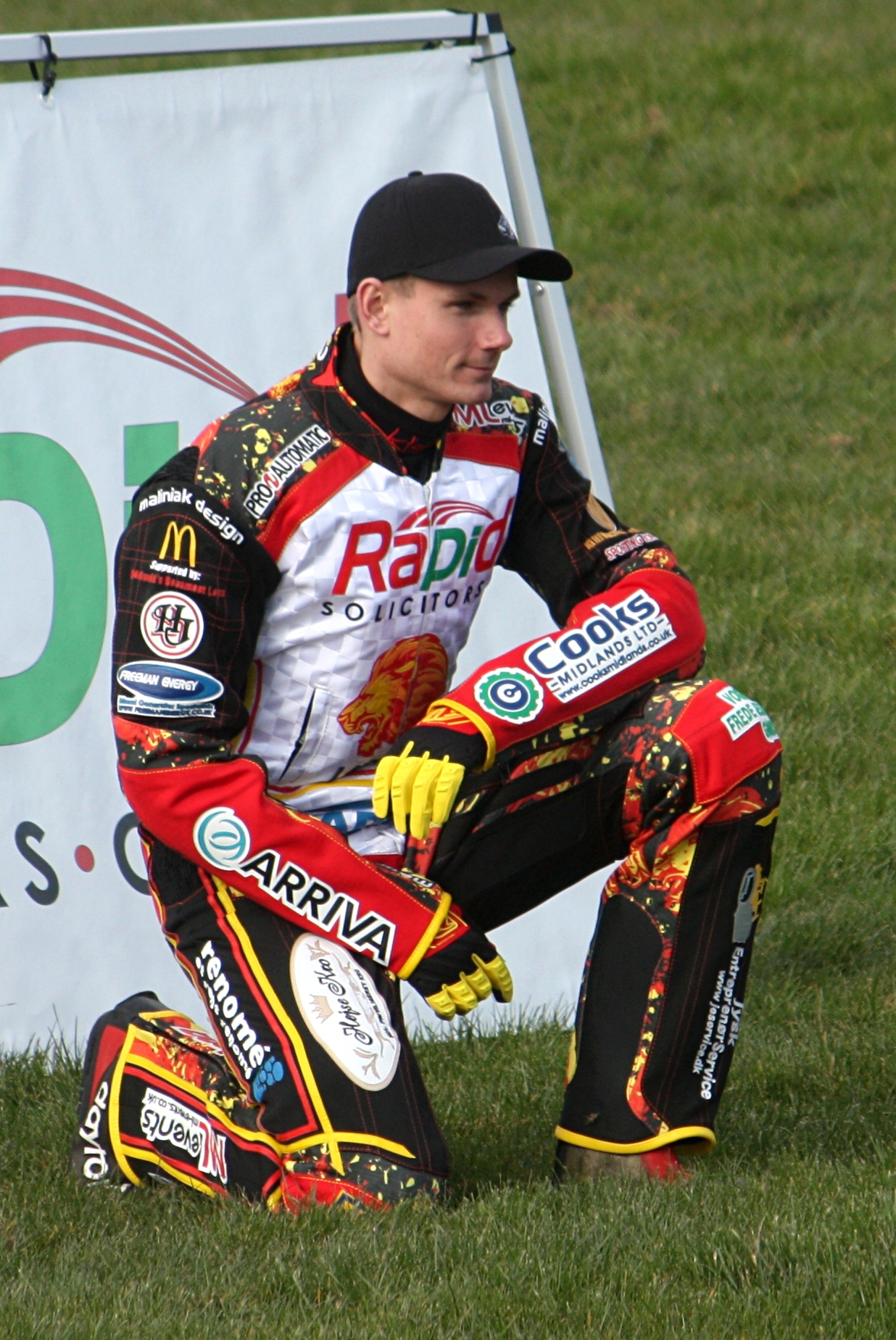
- Patrick Hougaard scored 10 points in the Super Final, helping Holsted Tigers win the title.

== Individual ==
=== Individual Championship ===
The 2014 Danish Individual Speedway Championship was the 2014 edition of the Danish Individual Speedway Championship. The final was staged over two rounds, at Holstebro and Fjelsted, and was won by Niels Kristian Iversen. It was the third time Iversen had won the national title, having also been victorious in 2012 and 2013.

The competition started with two semi finals, with four progressing to the final series from each. The final series was held over two rounds, with the top four scorers from the two rounds then competing in a Grand Final. The points from the Grand Final were then added to the total score and the overall winner was the rider with the most total points.

Semi finals

- 2 May 2014, held at Grindsted

Pos.	Rider	Points	Details
1	Bjarne Pedersen	14	(2,3,3,3,3)
2	Mads Korneliussen	13	(3,3,2,3,2)
3	Nicklas Porsing	11	(2,2,3,2,2)
4	Jesper Søgaard-Kristiansen	10	(1,2,3,3,1)
5	Hans N. Andersen	10	(3,2,3,1,1)
6	Kenneth Hansen	8	(3,1,1,0,3)
7	Simon Nielsen	7	(3,2,0,2,0)
8	Tobias Thomsen	6	(0,3,0,0,3)
9	Rasmus Jensen	6	(1,1,1,R,3)
10	Anders Thomsen	6	(T,3,0,2,1)
11	Steen Jensen	6	(1,1,2,2,0)
12	Emil Grøndal	5	(1,0,1,3,0)
13	Kenni Nissen	5	(2,0,1,X,2)
14	Lasse Bjerre	5	(R,T,2,1,2)
15	Jesper B. Monberg	4	(R,1,2,X,1)
16	Patrick Josefson	2	(2)
17	Mikkel Salomonsen	1	(0,0,0,1,0)

- 2 May 2014, held at Glumsø

Pos.	Rider	Points	Details
1	Mikkel Bech Jensen	14	(2,3,3,3,3)
2	Leon Madsen	11	(3,3,3,1,1)
3	Ulrich Østergaard	10	(2,2,0,3,3)
4	Kenni Larsen	10	(3,3,2,2,0)
5	Nicolai Klindt	10	(1,1,3,2,3)
6	Mikkel Michelsen	10	(3,1,1,3,2)
7	Morten Risager	10	(2,0,3,3,2)
8	Claus Vissing	8	(1,3,1,F,3)
9	Nicki Barrett	7	(0,2,1,2,2)
10	René Bach	6	(2,2,2,F)
11	Jesper Scharff	5	(1,2,0,1,1)
12	Thomas Jørgensen	4	(3,1,R)
13	Johannes Kikkenborg	4	(0,0,2,2,X)
14	Kasper Lykke Nielsen	4	(1,1,2,0,0)
15	Dennis Pedersen	3	(X,T,1,1,1)
16	Mikkel B. Andersen	0	(0,X,M,0)
17	Patrick Lykke Nielsen	0	(X)

Final series

Round one

- 15 May 2014, held at Holstebro

Pos.	Rider	Points	Details
1	Niels Kristian Iversen	12	(2,3,3,1,3)
2	Bjarne Pedersen	12	(3,3,2,2,2)
3	Nicolai Klindt	11	(3,0,3,2,3)
4	Mads Korneliussen	11	(3,2,1,3,2)
5	Peter Kildemand	10	(2,3,2,0,3)
6	Mikkel Michelsen	10	(1,2,3,3,1)
7	Hans N. Andersen	9	(3,1,2,3,0)
8	Michael Jepsen Jensen	9	(1,2,3,2,1)
9	Kenni Larsen	9	(2,3,X,2,2)
10	Mikkel Bech Jensen	8	(0,0,2,3,3)
11	Ulrich Østergaard	6	(1,1,1,1,2)
12	Nicklas Porsing	4	(2,2,0,0,T)
13	Kenneth Hansen	3	(0,1,F,1,1)
14	Jonas Andersen	3	(0,1,F,1,1)
15	Leon Madsen	2	(1,0,0,1,0)
16	Jesper Søgaard-Kristiansen	1	(0,0,1,R,0)
17	Claus Vissing	0	(-,-,-,-,0)

Round two

- 8 August 2014, held at Fjelsted

Pos.	Rider	Points	Details
1	Niels Kristian Iversen	16	(2,3,3,2,3.3)
2	Peter Kildemand	14	(3,3,2,3,1,2)
3	Michael Jepsen Jensen	12	(3,2,3,2,2,0)
4	Mikkel Bech Jensen	12	(0,3,3,3,3)
5	Bjarne Pedersen	10	(2,1,2,1,3,1)
6	Kenneth Hansen	9	(3,2,1,1,2)
7	Hans N. Andersen	8	(1,0,2,2,3)
8	Ulrich Østergaard	8	(2,3,2,0,1)
9	Kenni Larsen	8	(1,2,1,3,1)
10	Mads Korneliussen	7	(0,1,3,1,2)
11	Nikolaj Busk Jakobsen	7	(2,2,0,1,2)
12	Mikkel Michelsen	6	(-,3,0,1,2)
13	Nicolai Klindt	5	(0,1,1,3,X)
14	Jonas Andersen	2	(1,0,0,0,1)
15	Jesper Søgaard-Kristiansen	2	(1,1,0,0,0)
16	Jesper Scharff	0	(-,-,-,0,0)
17	Nicklas Porsing	0	(E,E,X,-,-)
18	Rasmus Jensen	0	(-,-,E,-,-)

Final classification

Pos.	Rider	Points	R1	R2
1	Niels Kristian Iversen (Esbjerg)	28	12	16
2	Peter Kildemand (Fjelsted)	24	10	14
3	Bjarne Pedersen (Holstebro)	22	12	10
4	Michael Jepsen Jensen (Grindsted)	21	9	12
5	Mikkel Bech Jensen (Esbjerg)	20	8	12
6	Mads Korneliussen (Region Varde)	18	11	7
7	Hans N. Andersen (Munkebo)	17	9	8
-	Kenni Larsen (Munkebo)	17	9	8
9	Nicolai Klindt (Holsted)	16	11	5
10	Mikkel Michelsen (Slangerup)	16	10	6
11	Ulrich Østergaard (Fjelsted)	14	6	8
12	Kenneth Hansen (Slangerup)	12	3	9
13	Nikolaj Busk Jakobsen (Fjelsted)	7	–	7
14	Jonas Andersen (Holstebro)	5	3	2
15	Nicklas Porsing (Region Varde)	4	4	0
16	Jesper Søgaard-Kristiansen (Slangerup)	4	2	2
17	Leon Madsen (Slangerup)	2	2	–
18	Claus Vissing (Fjelsted)	0	0	–
19	Jesper Scharff (Munkebo)	0	–	0
-	Rasmus Jensen (Holsted)	0	–	0

=== U21 Championship ===
Mikkel Bech Jensen won the U21 Championship at Silkeborg on 5 September.

Pos.	Rider	Points
1	Mikkel Bech	15
2	Emil Grøndal	13
3	Kasper Lykke Nielsen	13
4	Jonas B. Andersen	10
5	Nikolaj Busk Jakobsen	9
6	Jonas Jensen	9
7	Tobias Thomsen	9
8	Kenni Nissen	9
9	Stefan Pedersen	7
10	Jesper Scharff	6
11	Patrik Josefsen	6
12	Lasse Bjerre	6
13	Patrick Lykke Nielsen	4
14	Lasse Portner	1
15	Emil Engstrøm	1
16	Anders Thomsen	0

== Team ==
=== Danish Speedway League ===
The Danish Speedway League was won by Holsted Tigers for the 14th time.

Outrup Speedway Club changed their name to Region Varde Elitesport.

Pos	Team	P	W	D	L	Pts	BP	Total
1	Holsted Tigers	14	9	0	5	18	6	24
2	Esbjerg Vikings	14	8	0	6	16	6	22
3	Region Varde	14	8	0	6	16	3	19
4	Munkebo	14	7	0	7	14	4	18
5	Holstebro	14	6	1	7	13	3	16
6	Slangerup	14	6	0	8	12	3	15
7	Fjelsted	14	6	1	7	12	2	14+
8	Grindsted	14	5	0	9	10	1	11

- Fjelsted deducted 1 point for breaking the rules on the use of guest riders

Super Final

Pos	Team	Pts	Riders
1	Holsted	40	R Jensen 10, Hougaard 10, N Pedersen 9, T Pedersen 8, Barrett 3
2	Munkebo	34	Bogdanovs 12, H Andersen 9, Thörnblom 6, Lykke Nielsen 4, Scharff 3
3	Esbjerg	31	Bech 15, Palm Toft 9, Bach 4, Suchecki 2, J Jensen 1
4	Region Varde	27	Pieszczek 10, Doyle 9, Korneliussen 6, Gjedde 2, Thomsen 0

=== Teams ===
Holsted

- (Denmark) Nicki Pedersen
- (Denmark) Bjarne Pedersen
- (Denmark) Rasmus Jensen
- (Denmark) Patrick Hougaard
- (Denmark) Nicolai Klindt
- (Slovakia) Martin Vaculik
- (Denmark) Henrik Møller
- (Poland) Adrian Gomolski
- (Finland) Timo Lahti
- (Denmark) Jonas B. Andersen
- (Denmark) Nicki Barrett
- (Denmark) Tommy Pedersen

Munkebo

- (Denmark) Hans Andersen
- (Denmark) Jesper Scharff
- (Sweden) Mathias Thörnblom
- (Latvia) Maksims Bogdanovs
- (Denmark) Kasper Lykke Nielsen
- (Denmark) Morten Risager
- (Denmark) Kenni Larsen
- (Sweden) Thomas H. Jonasson
- (Denmark) Jakob Buhave
- (Denmark) Patrick Lykke Nielsen

Esbjerg

- (Denmark) Niels Kristian Iversen
- (Denmark) Mikkel Bech
- (Denmark) Michael Palm Toft
- (Denmark) René Bach
- (Poland) Zbigniew Suchecki
- (Denmark) Thomas Jørgensen
- (Denmark) Patrick Josefsen
- (Australia) Max Fricke
- (Poland) Grzegorz Zengota
- (Denmark) Steen Jensen
- (Russia) Artem Laguta
- (Denmark) Kasper Lykke Nielsen

Region Varde

- (Australia) Chris Holder
- (Denmark) Mads Korneliussen
- (Australia) Jason Doyle
- (Poland) Krystian Pieszczek
- (Denmark) Charlie Gjedde
- (Denmark) Tobias Thomsen
- (Denmark) Nicklas Porsing
- (Australia) Max Fricke
- (Poland) Krzysztof Jablonski
- (Sweden) Antonio Lindbäck
- (Sweden) Ricky Kling

Holstebro

- (Denmark) Bjarne Pedersen
- (Ukraine) Andriy Karpov
- (Australia) Cameron Woodward
- (Denmark) Emil Grondal
- (Denmark) Jonas B. Andersen
- (Denmark) Mikkel B. Andersen
- (Poland) Norbert Kosciuch
- (Russia) Vadim Tarasenko

Slangerup

- (United States) Greg Hancock
- (Denmark) Kenneth Kruse Hansen
- (Denmark) Mikkel Michelsen
- (Denmark) Leon Madsen
- (Denmark) Kenni Nissen
- (Denmark) Jesper Søgaard-Kristiansen

Fjelsted

- (Denmark) Nikolaj Busk Jakobsen
- (Denmark) Peter Kildemand
- (Denmark) Ulrich Ostergaard
- (Denmark) Anders Thomsen
- (Denmark) Claus Vissing
- (Poland) Miroslaw Jablonski
- (Poland) Mariusz Staszewski
- (Denmark) Jesper B. Monberg
- (Denmark) Lasse Bjerre
- (Australia) Troy Batchelor

Grindsted

- (Denmark) Michael Jepsen Jensen
- (Poland) Kacper Gomolski
- (Poland) Szymon Wozniak
- (Sweden) Victor Palovaara
- (Sweden) Joel Larsson
- (Denmark) Jonas Jensen
- (Denmark) Henrik Vedel
- (Denmark) Emil Grondal
- (Denmark) Andreas Lyager
- (Denmark) Henning Bager
- (Denmark) Claes Nedermark
- (Denmark) Johannes Kikkenborg
