= 2013 Danish speedway season =

Season of speedway in Denmark

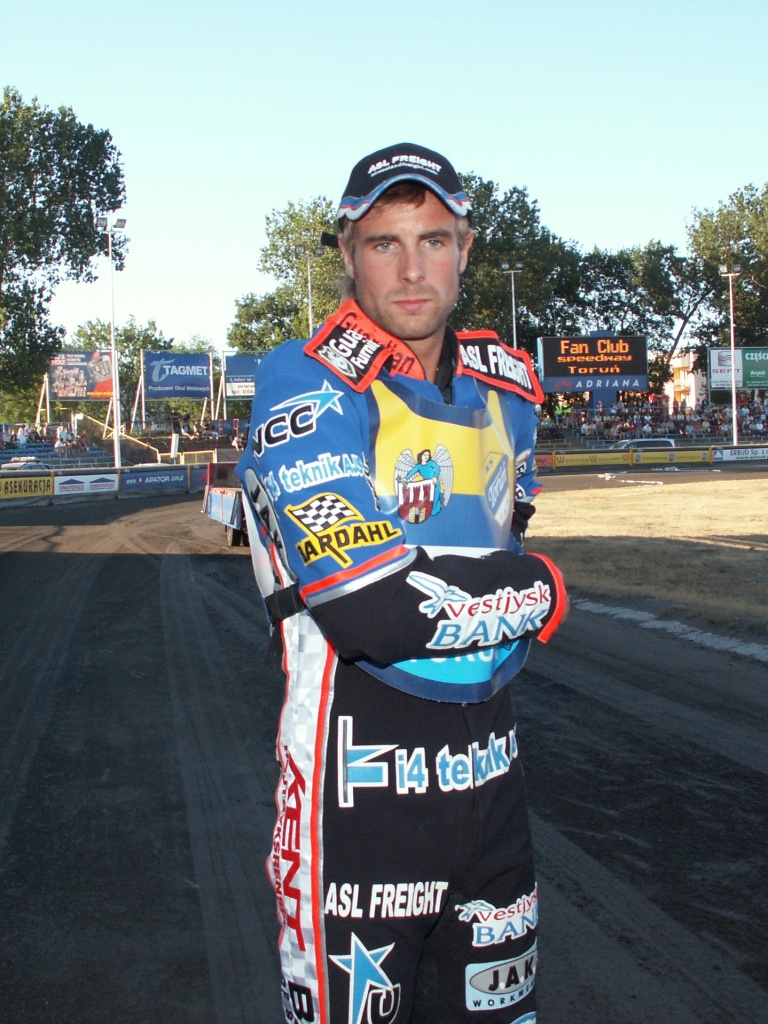
- Niels Kristian Iversen successfully defended his title and helped Esbjerg win the Super Final.

== Individual ==
=== Individual Championship ===
The 2013 Danish Individual Speedway Championship was the 2013 edition of the Danish Individual Speedway Championship. The final was staged over two rounds, at Holsted and Slangerup, and was won by Niels Kristian Iversen. It was the second time Iversen had won the national title, having also been victorious the year before.

The competition started with two semi finals, with five progressing to the final series from each. The final series was held over two rounds, with the top four scorers from the two rounds then competing in a Grand Final. The points from the Grand Final were then added to the total score and the overall winner was the rider with the most total points.

Semi finals

- 4 May 2013, held at Outrup

Pos.	Rider	Points	Details
1	Michael Jepsen Jensen	14	(3,3,3,2,3)
2	Peter Kildemand	13	(3,3,2,2,3)
3	Morten Risager	12	(3,2,3,3,1)
4	Nicklas Porsing	11	(1,1,3,3,3)
5	Nicolai Klindt	10	(2,3,1,3,1)
6	Mikkel Bech Jensen	10	(1,2,2,3,2)
7	Jesper B. Monberg	8	(3,1,1,1,2)
8	Johannes Kikkenborg	8	(2,1,2,2,1)
9	Kenneth Hansen	7	(2,2,0,0,3)
10	Nikolaj Busk Jakobsen	7	(1,3,1,0,2)
11	Simon Nielsen	5	(1,1,0,0,3)
12	Jesper Søgaard-Kristiansen	4	(0,X,0,2,2)
13	Anders Thomsen	4	(2,2,0,R,R)
14	Steen Jensen	3	(X,R,2,1,0)
15	Kenneth Dryvig Jensen	2	(1,1)
16	Marc Randrup	1	(1,0,0,0,0)
17	Jonas Raun	1	(0,R,1)

- 4 May 2013, held at Holstebro

Pos.	Rider	Points	Details
1	Kenni Larsen	14	(3,3,2,3,3)
2	Patrick Hougaard	13	(3,2,3,2,3)
3	Bjarne Pedersen	12	(2,3,3,3,1)
4	Mikkel Michelsen	11	(2,3,1,2,3)
5	René Bach	11	(1,3,2,3,1)
6	Kenneth Bjerre	10	(2,2,3,1,2)
7	Claus Vissing	8	(2,F,1,3,2)
8	Jonas Andersen	8	(3,1,1,2,1)
9	Rasmus Jensen	8	(3,0,1,1,3)
10	Lasse Bjerre	6	(X,2,3,1,0)
11	Ulrich Østergaard	6	(0,1,2,1,2)
12	Henrik Møller	4	(0,0,0,2,2)
13	Mikkel B. Andersen	3	(1,2,0,0,0)
14	Emil Grøndal	3	(X,1,2,0,0)
15	Kasper Lykke Nielsen	3	(1,1,0,0,1)
16	Klaus Jakobsen	1	(1)
15	Charlie Gjedde	DNS	

Final series

Round one

- 24 May 2013, held at Slangerup

Pos.	Rider	Points	Details
1	Niels Kristian Iversen	12	(3,3,3,3,0)
2	Peter Kildemand	11	(3,2,1,3,2)
3	Nicolai Klindt	10	(3,0,2,3,2)
4	Kenneth Bjerre	10	(2,3,0,2,3)
5	Michael Jepsen Jensen	10	(1,3,1,2,3)
6	Kenni Larsen	10	(2,1,3,3,1)
7	Hans N. Andersen	10	(2,2,1,2,3)
8	Bjarne Pedersen	9	(1,3,2,2,1)
9	Leon Madsen	8	(0,2,3,1,2)
10	Patrick Hougaard	7	(2,0,1,1,3)
11	Mads Korneliussen	5	(1,1,3,X,-)
12	Mikkel Michelsen	4	(3,0,T,0,1)
13	Mikkel Bech Jensen	4	(1,0,0,1,2)
14	Nicklas Porsing	4	(0,1,2,1,0)
15	Morten Risager	3	(0,2,0,0,1)
16	René Bach	3	(0,1,2,0,0)
17	Jesper B. Monberg	0	(-,-,0,-,-)
18	Jonas Andersen	0	(-,-,-,-,0)

Round two

- 30 August 2013, held at Holsted

Pos.	Rider	Points	Details
1	Niels Kristian Iversen	17	(3,2,3,3,3,3)
2	Kenneth Bjerre	11	(E,2,2,2,3,2)
3	Michael Jepsen Jensen	11	(2,1,2,3,2,1)
4	Nicki Pedersen	11	(2,3,3,2,1)
5	Peter Kildemand	10	(2,2,2,1,3,R)
6	Patrick Hougaard	9	(3,2,3,1,0)
7	Mikkel Bech Jensen	9	(3,1,1,3,1)
8	Hans N. Andersen	9	(1,3,1,2,2)
9	Bjarne Pedersen	8	(0,3,2,1,2)
10	Leon Madsen	7	(3,3,0,1,0)
11	Mads Korneliussen	7	(1,0,3,0,3)
12	Mikkel Michelsen	5	(0,E,0,3,2)
13	Morten Risager	5	(0,1,1,2,1)
14	René Bach	3	(2,0,1,0,0)
15	Nicolai Klindt	2	(1,1,0,0,0)
16	Nicklas Porsing	2	(1,0,X,0,1)

Final classification

Pos.	Rider	Points	R1	R2
1	Niels Kristian Iversen (Esbjerg)	29	12	17
2	Kenneth Bjerre (Outrup)	21	10	11
3	Michael Jepsen Jensen (Grindsted)	21	10	11
4	Peter Kildemand (Fjelsted)	21	11	10
5	Hans N. Andersen (Fjelsted)	19	10	9
6	Bjarne Pedersen (Holstebro)	17	9	8
7	Patrick Hougaard (Holsted)	16	7	9
8	Leon Madsen (Slangerup)	15	8	7
9	Mikkel Bech Jensen (Glumso)	13	4	9
10	Nicolai Klindt (Holsted)	12	10	2
11	Mads Korneliussen (Outrup)	12	5	7
12	Nicki Pedersen (Holsted)	11	–	11
13	Kenni Larsen (Munkebo)	10	10	–
14	Mikkel Michelsen (Slangerup)	9	4	5
15	Morten Risager (Munkebo)	8	3	5
16	Nicklas Porsing (Holsted)	6	4	2
17	René Bach (Esbjerg)	6	3	3
18	Jesper B. Monberg (Slangerup)	0	0	–
-	Jonas Andersen (Brovst)	0	0	–

=== U21 Championship ===
Mikkel Michelsen won the U21 Championship at Randers on 7 September.

Pos.	Rider	Points
1	Mikkel Michelsen	13+3
2	Michael Jepsen Jensen	14+0
3	Lasse Bjerre	11+2
4	Nicklas Porsing	11+0
5	Nikolaj Busk Jakobsen	11
6	Mikkel B. Jensen	10
7	Jonas B. Andersen	10
8	Andreas Lyager	7
9	Kenni Nissen	6
10	Jesper Scharff	6
11	Mikkel Salomonsen	5
12	Dennis L Pedersen	4
13	Patrick Lykke Nielsen	4
14	Jakob Bukhave	3
15	Tobias Thomsen	3
16	Kenneth Dyrvig Jensen	0

== Team ==
=== Danish Speedway League ===
The Danish Speedway League was won by Esbjerg Vikings for the 10th time.

Pos	Team	P	W	D	L	Pts	BP	Total
1	Esbjerg Vikings	14	11	1	2	23	7	30
2	Fjelsted	14	9	0	5	18	6	24
3	Holsted Tigers	14	8	1	5	17	4	21
4	Slangerup	14	7	1	6	15	3	18
5	Holstebro	14	6	1	7	13	2	15
6	Grindsted	14	6	0	8	12	3	15
7	Munkebo	14	4	0	10	8	3	11
8	Outrup	14	3	0	11	6	0	6

Super Final

Pos	Team	Pts	Riders
1	Esbjerg	41	Iversen 14, MB Jensen 12, Palm Toft 7, S Jensen 5, Bach 3
2	Fjelsted	37	Kildemand 16, Andersen 9, Zetterström 8, Søgaard-K 4, NB Jakobsen 0
3	Holsted	37	Hougaard 14, N Pedersen 12, Klindt 7, R Jensen 4, Nielsen 0
4	Slangerup	23	K Hansen 11, Jabłoński 6, Michelsen 3, Nissen 3, Eklöf 1

=== Teams ===
Esbjerg

- (Denmark) Niels Kristian Iversen
- (Denmark) Mikkel Bech
- (Denmark) René Bach
- (Denmark) Michael Palm Toft
- (Denmark) Steen Jensen
- (Russia) Artem Laguta
- (Poland) Patryk Dudek
- (Poland) Grzegorz Zengota
- (Poland) Zbigniew Suchecki
- (Denmark) Thomas Jørgensen

Fjelsted

- (Denmark) Peter Kildemand
- (Denmark) Hans Andersen
- (Denmark) Nicki Barrett
- (Denmark) Jesper Søgaard-Kristiansen
- (Denmark) Nikolaj Busk Jakobsen
- (Sweden) Magnus Zetterstrom
- (Denmark) Thomas Jørgensen
- (Denmark) Jakob Buhave
- (Australia) Jason Doyle
- (Denmark) Henrik Møller

Holsted

- (Denmark) Nicki Pedersen
- (Denmark) Patrick Hougaard
- (Denmark) Rasmus Jensen
- (Denmark) Nicolai Klindt
- (Denmark) Simon Nielsen
- (Russia) Renat Gafurov
- (Sweden) Pontus Aspgren
- (Poland) Damian Balinski
- (Australia) Brady Kurtz

Slangerup

- (Denmark) Kenneth Kruse Hansen
- (Denmark) Mikkel Michelsen
- (Denmark) Leon Madsen
- (Sweden) Linus Eklöf
- (Denmark) Kasper Lykke Nielsen
- (Poland) Miroslaw Jabłoński
- (Denmark) Kenni Nissen
- (Denmark) Jesper Søgaard-Kristiansen
- (Denmark) Jesper B. Monberg
- (Australia) Cameron Woodward

Holstebro

- (Denmark) Bjarne Pedersen
- (Ukraine) Andriej Karpov
- (Denmark) Emil Grondal
- (Ukraine) Aleksandr Loktaev
- (Poland) Przemyslaw Pawlicki
- (Denmark) Nikolaj Busk Jakobsen
- (Denmark) Jonas B. Andersen
- (Denmark) Mikkel B. Andersen
- (Poland) Ronnie Jamroży

Grindsted

- (Denmark) Michael Jepsen Jensen
- (Poland) Rafał Trojanowski
- (Denmark) Nicklas Porsing
- (Denmark) Tommy Pedersen
- (Sweden) Linus Sundstrom
- (Denmark) Emil Meyer
- (Poland) Szymon Wozniak
- (Denmark) Claus Lauridsen
- (Poland) Kacper Gomolski
- (Poland) Norbert Kościuch
- (Germany) Martin Smolinski
- (Denmark) Ulrich Ostergaard
- (Denmark) Jonas Raun
- (Denmark) Johannes Kikkenborg

Munkebo

- (England) Scott Nicholls
- (Poland) Krzysztof Buczkowski
- (Denmark) Morten Risager
- (Denmark) Kenni Larsen
- (Denmark) Anders Thomsen
- (Denmark) Nicki Barrett
- (Denmark) Henning Bager
- (Germany) Kevin Wolbert
- (Australia) Cameron Heeps
- (Denmark) Claus Vissing

Outrup

- (Denmark) Kenneth Bjerre
- (Denmark) Lasse Bjerre
- (United States) Ryan Fisher
- (Denmark) Mads Korneliussen
- (Denmark) Marc Randrup
- (Denmark) Jesper Scharff
- (Denmark) Claes Nedermark
- (Poland) Krystian Pieszczek
- (Denmark) Claus Vissing
- (Poland) Krzysztof Jablonski
- (Sweden) Oliver Berntzon
- (Denmark) Andreas Lyager
- (Poland) Artur Mroczka
- (Poland) Daniel Jeleniewski
- (Norway) Rune Holta
