= 2012 Danish speedway season =

Season of speedway in Denmark

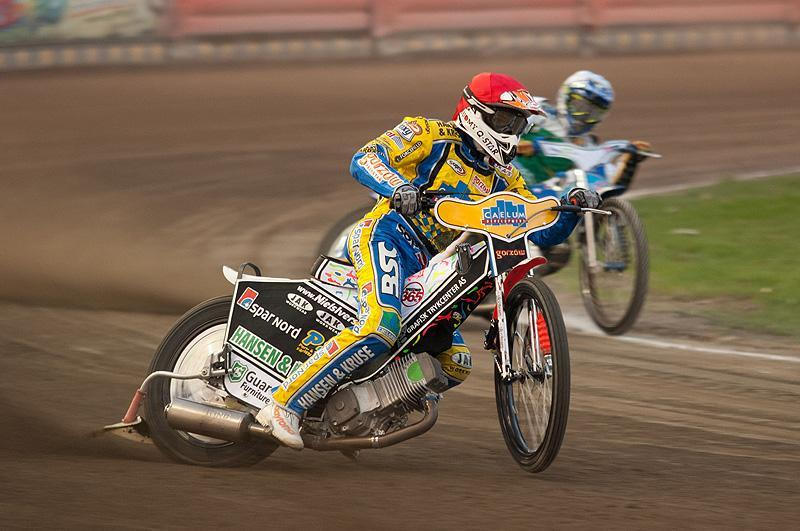
- Niels Kristian Iversen won his first Danish title.

== Individual ==
=== Individual Championship ===
The 2012 Danish Individual Speedway Championship was the 2012 edition of the Danish Individual Speedway Championship. The final was staged over two rounds, at Holsted and Outrup, and was won by Niels Kristian Iversen.

The competition started with two semi finals, with five progressing to the final series from each. The final series was held over two rounds, with the top four scorers from the two rounds then competing in a Grand Final. The points from the Grand Final were then added to the total score and the overall winner was the rider with the most total points.

Semi finals

- 29 April 2012, held at Fjelsted

| Pos. | Rider | Points | Details |
|---|---|---|---|
| 1 | Leon Madsen | 14 | (3,3,3,2,3) |
| 2 | Mikkel Michelsen | 14 | (3,3,3,3,2) |
| 3 | Charlie Gjedde | 13 | (2,2,3,3,3) |
| 4 | Peter Kildemand | 12 | (3,2,2,3,2) |
| 5 | Nicolai Klindt | 10 | (3,3,2,2,0) |
| 6 | Ulrich Østergaard | 9 | (1,3,2,2,1) |
| 7 | Nikolaj Busk Jakobsen | 7 | (2,0,3,2,0) |
| 8 | Thomas Jørgensen | 7 | (2,2,0,3,0) |
| 9 | Henrik Møller | 6 | (1,2,1,0,2) |
| 10 | Patrick Bjerregaard | 5 | (0,0,1,1,3) |
| 11 | Peter Juul Larsen | 5 | (1,1,0,0,3) |
| 12 | Jonas Andersson | 5 | (0,0,2,1,2) |
| 13 | Kenni Nissen | 4 | (1,1,1,0,1) |
| 14 | Lasse Bjerre | 3 | (1,2,E,-,-) |
| 15 | Rasmus Jensen | 3 | (0,1,1,1,0) |
| 16 | Tommy Pedersen | 2 | (-,E,-,1,1) |
| 17 | Jesper Scharff | 1 | (-,-,0,0,1) |
| 18 | Klaus Jakobsen | 0 | (E,-,-,-,-) |

- 15 May 2012, held at Esbjerg

| Pos. | Rider | Points | Details |
|---|---|---|---|
| 1 | Patrick Hougaard | 14 | (3,2,3,3,3) |
| 2 | Mads Korneliussen | 14 | (3,3,3,2,3) |
| 3 | Mikkel Bech Jensen | 11 | (2,3,2,1,3) |
| 4 | Jesper B. Monberg | 10 | (1,2,2,3,2) |
| 5 | Kenneth Hansen | 9 | (2,3,1,1,2) |
| 6 | Jonas Raun | 9 | (2,1,1,2,3) |
| 7 | Steen Jensen | 9 | (3,3,0,3,0) |
| 8 | René Bach | 9 | (3,2,0,2,2) |
| 9 | Claus Vissing | 7 | (R,R,2,3,2) |
| 10 | Nicklas Porsing | 7 | (2,1,3,0,1) |
| 11 | Jesper Søgaard-Kristiansen | 7 | (1,1,3,1,1) |
| 12 | Claes Nedermark | 5 | (0,2,2,_,1) |
| 13 | Nicki Barrett | 4 | (1,X,1,2,-) |
| 14 | Marc Randrup | 4 | (1,1,1,1,0) |
| 15 | Kenneth Dryvig Jensen | 1 | (0,0,0,0,1) |

Final series

Round one

- 16 May 2012, held at Holsted

| Pos. | Rider | Points | Details |
|---|---|---|---|
| 1 | Nicki Pedersen | 14 | (3,3,2,3,3) |
| 2 | Niels Kristian Iversen | 12 | (3,3,1,2,3) |
| 3 | Michael Jepsen Jensen | 11 | (2,2,3,3,1) |
| 4 | Hans N. Andersen | 11 | (1,3,3,1,3) |
| 5 | Mikkel Bech Jensen | 9 | (3,1,0,3,2) |
| 6 | Leon Madsen | 9 | (1,3,2,3,X) |
| 7 | Mikkel Michelsen | 8 | (2,1,2,2,2) |
| 8 | Peter Kildemand | 8 | (3,2,1,0,2) |
| 9 | Bjarne Pedersen | 8 | (2,1,2,1,2) |
| 10 | Patrick Hougaard | 6 | (0,0,1,2,3) |
| 11 | Kenneth Hansen | 6 | (0,1,3,1,1) |
| 12 | Mads Korneliussen | 6 | (2,2,1,0,1) |
| 13 | Kenneth Bjerre | 4 | (X,0,3,0,1) |
| 14 | Charlie Gjedde | 4 | (1,2,0,1,0) |
| 15 | Ulrich Østergaard | 2 | (0,0,0,2,0) |
| 16 | Jesper B. Monberg | 1 | (1,0,0,0,0) |
| 17 | Jonas Raun | DNS | |
| 18 | Nikolaj Busk Jakobsen | DNS | |

Round two

- 31 August 2012, held at Outrup

| Pos. | Rider | Points | Details |
|---|---|---|---|
| 1 | Nicki Pedersen | 14 | (3,2,3,3,3) |
| 2 | Mads Korneliussen | 14 | (3,3,3,2,3) |
| 3 | Niels Kristian Iversen | 13 | (2,3,3,3,2) |
| 4 | Jesper B. Monberg | 11 | (1,1,3,3,3) |
| 5 | Leon Madsen | 10 | (E,3,1,3,3) |
| 6 | Bjarne Pedersen | 9 | (3,3,1,1,1) |
| 7 | Mikkel Bech Jensen | 9 | (3,2,2,1,1) |
| 8 | Peter Kildemand | 9 | (2,1,2,2,2) |
| 9 | Hans N. Andersen | 8 | (2,0,2,2,2) |
| 10 | Patrick Hougaard | 6 | (1,0,2,1,2) |
| 11 | Mikkel Michelsen | 5 | (1,0,1,2,1) |
| 12 | Nicolai Klindt | 4 | (0,2,1,1,0) |
| 13 | Nikolaj Busk Jakobsen | 3 | (0,2,0,0,1) |
| 14 | Jonas Raun | 3 | (2,1,0,0,0) |
| 15 | Michael Jepsen Jensen | 2 | (1,1,0,0,-) |
| 16 | Steen Jensen | 1 | (R,M,R,1,0) |
| 17 | Nicklas Porsing | 0 | (-,0,-,-,-) |
| 18 | Henrik Møller | 0 | (-,-,-,-,0) |

Final classification

Iversen won the race off to claim the title over Pedersen, Madsen beat Korneliussen in the race off to seal third place overall.

| Pos. | Rider | Points | R1 | R2 |
| 1 | Niels Kristian Iversen (Esbjerg) | 25 | 12 | 13 |
| 2 | Nicki Pedersen (Holsted) | 28 | 14 | 14 |
| 3 | Leon Madsen (Esbjerg) | 19 | 9 | 10 |
| 4 | Mads Korneliussen (Outrup) | 20 | 6 | 14 |
| 5 | Hans N. Andersen (Fjelsted) | 19 | 11 | 8 |
| 6 | Mikkel Bech Jensen (Esbjerg) | 18 | 9 | 9 |
| 7 | Bjarne Pedersen (Holstebro) | 17 | 8 | 9 |
| - | Peter Kildemand (Fjelsted) | 17 | 8 | 9 |
| 9 | Michael Jepsen Jensen (Slangerup) | 13 | 11 | 2 |
| 10 | Jesper B. Monberg (Holsted) | 12 | 1 | 11 |
| 11 | Patrick Hougaard (Holsted) | 12 | 6 | 6 |
| 12 | Kenneth Hansen (Slangerup) | 6 | 6 | – |
| 13 | Charlie Gjedde (Outrup) | 4 | 4 | – |
| - | Kenneth Bjerre (Grindsted) | 4 | 4 | – |
| - | Nicolai Klindt (Holsted) | 4 | – | 4 |
| 16 | Nikolaj Busk Jakobsen (Holstebro) | 3 | – | 3 |
| - | Jonas Raun (Outrup) | 3 | – | 3 |
| 18 | Ulrich Østergaard (Grindsted) | 2 | 2 | – |
| 19 | Steen Jensen (Esbjerg) | 1 | – | 1 |
| 20 | Nicklas Porsing (Holsted) | 0 | – | 0 |
| - | Henrik Møller (Fjelsted) | 0 | – | 0 |

=== U21 Championship ===
Michael Jepsen Jensen won the U21 Championship at Vojens on 11 August.

| Pos. | Rider | Points |
|---|---|---|
| 1 | Michael Jepsen Jensen | 13+3 |
| 2 | Nicklas Porsing | 11+2 |
| 3 | Mikkel Michelsen | 12+1 |
| 4 | Nikolaj Busk Jakobsen | 11+0 |
| 5 | Mikkel B. Jensen | 10 |
| 6 | Rasmus Jensen | 9 |
| 7 | Lasse Bjerre | 9 |
| 8 | Marc Randrup | 8 |
| 9 | Emil Grøndal | 7 |
| 10 | Kenni Nissen | 6 |
| 11 | Anders Vad | 6 |
| 12 | Anders Thomsen | 6 |
| 13 | Kasper Lykke Nielsen | 5 |
| 14 | Emil Meyer | 4 |
| 15 | Patrick Bjerregaard | 2 |
| 16 | Kenneth Dyrvig Jensen | 0 |

== Team ==
=== Danish Speedway League ===
The Danish Speedway League was won by Esbjerg Vikings for the 9th time. The format changed slightly in that a play off called the Super final was held to determine the league champion. Vojens Speedway Klub resigned from the league due to financial problems.

| Pos | Team | P | W | D | L | Pts | BP | Total |
|---|---|---|---|---|---|---|---|---|
| 1 | Esbjerg Vikings | 12 | 9 | 0 | 3 | 18 | 6 | 24 |
| 2 | Fjelsted | 12 | 8 | 0 | 4 | 15 | 5 | 21 |
| 3 | Holsted Tigers | 12 | 7 | 1 | 4 | 15 | 4 | 19 |
| 4 | Holstebro | 12 | 7 | 0 | 5 | 14 | 3 | 17 |
| 5 | Slangerup | 12 | 4 | 0 | 8 | 8 | 2 | 10 |
| 6 | Grindsted | 12 | 3 | 1 | 8 | 7 | 1 | 8 |
| 7 | Outrup | 12 | 3 | 0 | 9 | 6 | 0 | 6 |

Super Final

| Pos | Team | Pts | Riders |
|---|---|---|---|
| 1 | Esbjerg | 37 | Iversen 15, Madsen 12, MB Jensen 6, S Jensen 3, Kristiansen 1 |
| 2 | Fjelsted | 36 | Kildemand 10, Vissing 9, Andersen 8, Møller 5, Bach 4 |
| 3 | Holsted | 34 | N Pedersen 13, R Jensen 10, Klindt 6, Hougaard 5, Porsing 0 |
| 4 | Holstebro | 28 | B Pedersen 11, Loktaev 8, Karpov 7, NB Jakobsen 1, JB Andersen 1 |

=== Teams ===
Esbjerg

- (Denmark) Niels Kristian Iversen
- (Denmark) Mikkel Bech
- (Denmark) Leon Madsen
- (Denmark) Steen Jensen
- (Denmark) Jesper Kristiansen
- (Poland) Patryk Dudek
- (Denmark) Kasper Lykke Nielsen
- (Denmark) Simon Nielsen
- (Poland) Damian Adamczak
- (Denmark) Emil Meyer
- (Poland) Sebastian Ułamek
- (Poland) Dawid Stachyra
- (Poland) Zbigniew Suchecki

Fjelsted

- (Denmark) Peter Kildemand
- (Denmark) Hans Andersen
- (Australia) Jason Doyle
- (Denmark) Henrik Møller
- (Denmark) Claus Vissing
- (Denmark) René Bach
- (Denmark) Anders Thomsen
- (Sweden) Magnus Zetterstrom
- (United States) Ryan Fisher
- (Sweden) Jacob Thorssell
- (Denmark) Michael Palm Toft

Holsted

- (Denmark) Nicki Pedersen
- (Denmark) Patrick Hougaard
- (Denmark) Rasmus Jensen
- (Denmark) Nicolai Klindt
- (Denmark) Nicklas Porsing
- (Poland) Przemyslaw Pawlicki
- (Poland) Miroslaw Jablonski
- (Slovakia) Martin Vaculik
- (Denmark) Jesper B. Monberg
- (Denmark) Morten Risager
- (Poland) Damian Balinski

Holstebro

- (Denmark) Bjarne Pedersen
- (Ukraine) Aleksandr Loktaev
- (Ukraine) Andriej Karpov
- (Denmark) Nikolaj Busk Jakobsen
- (Denmark) Jonas B. Andersen
- (Finland) Timo Lahti
- (Denmark) Emil Grondal
- (Poland) Robert Kosciecha

Slangerup

- (Denmark) Kenneth Kruse Hansen
- (Denmark) Mikkel Michelsen
- (Denmark) Jesper B. Monberg
- (United States) Greg Hancock
- (Poland) Grzegorz Zengota
- (Sweden) Anton Rosén
- (Denmark) Kenni Nissen
- (Denmark) Nicki Barrett
- (Denmark) Henning Bager
- (Denmark) Jan Graversen
- (Denmark) Thomas Jorgensen

Grindsted

- (Denmark) Michael Jepsen Jensen
- (Denmark) Lasse Bjerre
- (Denmark) Kenneth Bjerre
- (Australia) Davey Watt
- (Sweden) Mathias Thörnblom
- (Sweden) Linus Sundstrom
- (Denmark) Ulrich Ostergaard
- (Poland) Daniel Jeleniewski
- (Denmark) Johannes Kikkenborg
- (Denmark) Jesper Søgaard-Kristiansen
- (Poland) Rafał Trojanowski
- (Denmark) Marc Randrup

Outrup

- (Denmark) Mads Korneliussen
- (Denmark) Kenni Larsen
- (Sweden) Antonio Lindbäck
- (Denmark) Charlie Gjedde
- (Denmark) Claes Nedermark
- (Denmark) Marc Randrup
- (Germany) Tobias Busch
- (Denmark) Jonas Raun
- (Poland) Szymon Wozniak
- (Poland) Mariusz Staszewski
- (Denmark) Lasse Bjerre
