= 2012 Team Speedway Junior European Championship =

Motorcycle racing competition

Seasons
- ← 2011 2013 →

The 2012 Team Speedway Junior European Championship was the fifth UEM Team Speedway Junior European Championship season. It was the first time that the event had been run as an under 21 years of age event.

The Final took place on 8 September 2012 in Landshut, Germany. Defending Champion are Russia team. The champion title was won by Poland team (48 points) who beat Denmark (41 pts), Ukraine (19 pts) and a Germany (11 pts).

== Results ==
- Semifinal 1
- (Ukraine) Chervonograd
- 27 April 2012

National team	Pts.
Russia	46
Ukraine	29
Sweden	24
Czech Republic	20

- Semifinal 2
- (Poland) Opole
- 7 June 2012

National team	Pts.
Denmark	46
Poland	43
Slovenia	15
Czech Republic*	16

Czech Republic replaced the Great Britain team

- Final
- (Germany) Landshut
- 8 September 2012

Pos.	National team	Pts.
1	Poland	48
2	Denmark	41
3	Ukraine	19
4	Germany	11

Ukraine replaced the Russia team in Final

== Heat details ==
=== Semifinal 1 ===
- 27 April 2012
- (Ukraine) Chervonograd
- Girnuk Stadium (Length: 365 m)

Placing	Team / Rider name	Total	1	2	3	4	5	6	7	8	9	10	11	12	13	14	15	16	Pts	17	18	19	20
1	Russia	46	3	6	8	10	13	15	17	20	23	25	27	30	32	33	35	38		41	41	43	46
1	(13) Andrey Kudryashov	14		3					2		3							3	11				3
1	(14) Artem Vodyakov	12	3							3		2					2		10			2
1	(15) Vladimir Borodulin	11			2			2						3		1			8	3
1	(16) Vitaly Belousov	9				2	3						2		2				9		E
1	(20) Sergej Karachintcev	0																	0
2	Ukraine	29	0	0	1	2	4	4	7	8	9	9	12	14	15	17	20	20		22	25	28	29
2	(9) Andriy Kobrin	3			1		2					0						0	3	-
2	(10) Kirill Tsukanov	6				1		X			1						3		5				1
2	(11) Stanislav Melnychuk	1		0						1			-			-			1			-
2	(12) Volodymyr Teygel	6	0						-					2	1				3		3
2	(19) Oleksandr Loktaev	13							3				3			2			8	2		3
3	Sweden	24	1	2	5	8	9	12	13	13	13	16	16	16	16	16	17	19		19	21	22	24
3	(1) Jacob Thorssell	6				3				0				0				2	5			1
3	(2) Victor Palovaara	7			3				1				0				1		5		2
3	(3) Oliver Berntzon	9		1				3				3			E				7				2
3	(4) Henric Lindqvist	2	1				1				0					0			2	0
3	(17) None	0																	0
4	Czech Republic	20	2	4	4	4	4	5	5	7	9	10	11	12	15	18	18	19		20	20	20	20
4	(5) Eduard Krcmar	5	2					1					1					1	5				0
4	(6) Ondrej Veverka	3		2			0							1			0		3			0
4	(7) Roman Cejka	1				0			0			1				-			1		F
4	(8) Zdenek Holub	0			0					-	-				-				0	-
4	(18) Václav Milík, Jr.	11								2	2				3	3			10	1
Placing	Team / Rider name	Total	1	2	3	4	5	6	7	8	9	10	11	12	13	14	15	16	Pts	17	18	19	20

M - exclusion for exceeding two-minute time allowance • T - exclusion for touching the tapes • X - other exclusion • E - retired or mechanical failure • F - fell

Helmet colours were permanent for each team (Red, Blue, White and Yellow/Black). Colours in diagrams indicate gate positions:
gate A – inside	gate B	gate C	gate D – outside

=== Semifinal 2 ===
- 7 June 2012
- (Poland) Opole

Placing	Team / Rider name	Total	1	2	3	4	5	6	7	8	9	10	11	12	13	14	15	16	Pts	17	18	19	20
1	Denmark	46	3	5	6	9	12	14	17	20	23	26	27	29	32	32	35	38		41	41	43	46
1	(1) Nicklas Porsing	10				3				3				2				-	8			2
1	(2) Nikolaj Busk Jakobsen	2			1				-				1				-		2	-
1	(3) Rasmus Jensen	7		2				2				3			-				7		0
1	(4) Mikkel Michelsen	12	3				3				3					E			9				3
1	(17) Mikkel Bech Jensen	15							3						3		3	3	12	3
2	Poland	43	1	4	7	9	11	14	16	16	18	20	23	26	28	31	33	33		35	38	41	43
2	(13) Bartosz Zmarzlik	10		3					2		2							0	7		3
2	(14) Piotr Pawlicki Jr.	5	1							X		2					2		5	-
2	(15) Tobiasz Musielak	14			3			3						3		3			12				2
2	(16) Kacper Gomolski	12				2	2						3		2				9			3
2	(20) Adam Strzelec	2																	0	2
3	Slovenia	15	0	0	2	2	3	3	4	6	6	7	7	8	8	10	11	13		13	14	15	15
3	(9) Matic Ivacic	6			2		1					1						2	6				0
3	(10) Ladislav Vida	0				0		0			-						-		0	-
3	(11) Ziga Radkovic	5		F						2			0			2			4			1
3	(12) Nejc Malesic	3	0						1					1	0				2		1
3	(19) Jernej Pecnik	1									F						1		1	F
4	Czech Republic*	16	2	3	3	4	4	5	5	6	7	7	9	9	10	11	11	12		13	15	15	16
4	(5) Eduard Krcmar	7	2					1					2					1	6				1
4	(6) Ondrej Veverka	1		1			0							-			0		1	-
4	(7) Jan Holub III	4				1			0			0				1			2		2
4	(8) Zdenek Holub	3			0					1	1				1				3			0
4	(18) Ondrej Smetana	1												T					0	1
Placing	Team / Rider name	Total	1	2	3	4	5	6	7	8	9	10	11	12	13	14	15	16	Pts	17	18	19	20

M - exclusion for exceeding two-minute time allowance • T - exclusion for touching the tapes • X - other exclusion • E - retired or mechanical failure • F - fell

Helmet colours were permanent for each team (Red, Blue, White and Yellow/Black). Colours in diagrams indicate gate positions:
gate A – inside	gate B	gate C	gate D – outside

=== Final ===
- 8 September 2012
- (Germany) Landshut

Placing	Team / Rider name	Total	1	2	3	4	5	6	7	8	9	10	11	12	13	14	15	16	Pts	17	18	19	20
1	Poland	48	2	5	6	9	12	14	17	19	22	24	27	29	32	35	35	38		40	43	45	48
1	(5) Kacper Gomolski	7	2					2					3					-	7	-
1	(6) Tobiasz Musielak	10		3			3							2			0		8			2
1	(7) Piotr Pawlicki	14				3			3			2				3			11				3
1	(8) Lukasz Sowka	4			1					-	3				-				4		-
1	(18) Przemyslaw Pawlicki	13								2					3			3	8	2	3
2	Denmark	41	3	4	7	9	11	14	16	19	20	23	25	28	28	30	33	35		35	36	39	41
2	(13) Nikolaj Busk Jakobsen	7		1					2		1							2	6		1
2	(14) Mikkel Bech Jensen	14	3							3		3					3		12				2
2	(15) Mikkel Michelsen	14			3			3						3		2			11			3
2	(16) Nicklas Porsing	6				2	2						2		X				6	0
2	(20) Emil Grondal	0																	0
3	Ukraine	19	1	3	5	6	6	6	6	6	8	9	10	10	10	11	13	14		17	17	18	19
3	(9) Andriy Kobrin	5			2		E					1						1	4				1
3	(10) Kirill Tsukanov	1				1		E			-						-		1	-
3	(11) Stanislav Melnychuk	5		2						X			1			1			4			1
3	(12) Volodymyr Teygel	1	1						X					0	-				1		0
3	(19) Oleksandr Loktaev	7									2				T		2		4	3
4	Germany	11	0	0	0	0	1	2	3	4	4	4	4	5	7	7	8	8		9	11	11	11
4	(1) Kai Huckenbeck	2				0				1				1				0	2			0
4	(2) Marcel Helfer	3			0				1				0				-		1		2
4	(3) Danny Maassen	3		F				1				0			2				3				0
4	(4) Michel Hofmann	0	-				-				0					0			0	-
4	(17) Andre Mochner	3	0				1										1		2	1
Placing	Team / Rider name	Total	1	2	3	4	5	6	7	8	9	10	11	12	13	14	15	16	Pts	17	18	19	20

M - exclusion for exceeding two-minute time allowance • T - exclusion for touching the tapes • X - other exclusion • E - retired or mechanical failure • F - fell

Helmet colours were permanent for each team (Red, Blue, White and Yellow/Black). Colours in diagrams indicate gate positions:
gate A – inside	gate B	gate C	gate D – outside

== See also ==
- 2012 Team Speedway Junior World Championship
- 2012 Individual Speedway Junior European Championship
