= 2009 Danish speedway season =

Season of speedway in Denmark

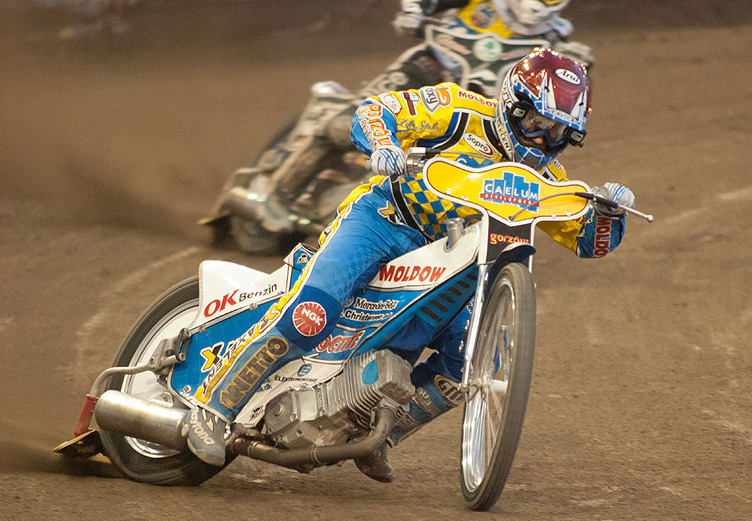
- Nicki Pedersen won a sixth individual title, moving into second place on the all-time list.

== Individual ==
=== Individual Championship ===
The 2009 Danish Individual Speedway Championship was the 2009 edition of the Danish Individual Speedway Championship. The final was staged over two rounds, at Vojens Speedway Center and Fjelsted, and was won by Nicki Pedersen. It was Pedersen's sixth national title, taking him level with Hans Nielsen in second place on the all-time list.

The competition started with two quarter finals, with four progressing to the semi-final from each. The top six then officially qualified from the semi-final, joining nine seeded riders and a wild card in the final series. The final series was held over two rounds, with the top four scorers from the two rounds then competing in a Grand Final. The points from the Grand Final were then added to the total score and the overall winner was the rider with the most total points.

Quarter finals

- 3 May 2009, held at Esbjerg

Pos.	Rider	Points
1	Leon Madsen	14
2	Lasse Bjerre	14
3	Krister Jacobsen	12
4	Patrick Nørgaard	10
5	Patrick Bjerregaard	9
6	Mads Skov	9
7	Henrik Vedel	8
8	Johannes Kikkenborg	8
9	Lars Hansen	7
10	Denis Spicker Thostesen	6
11	René Mortensen	6
12	Simon Werner	5
13	Morten Frahm Hansen	4
14	Michael Palm Toft	3
15	Nanna Jørgensen	1
16	Nicki Barrett	1

- 3 May 2009, held at Esbjerg

Pos.	Rider	Points
1	Klaus Jakobsen	14
2	René Bach	13
3	Michael Jepsen Jensen	12
4	Simon Nielsen	11
5	Jesper Søgaard-Kristiansen	10
6	Dannie Søderholm	9
7	Casper Wortmann	7
8	Kenni Larsen	6
9	Nicklas Porsing	6
10	René Madsen	5
11	Tommy Pedersen	5
12	Thomas Jørgensen	5
13	Peter Kildemand	5
14	Jeppe Schmidt	4
15	Morten Frahm Hansen	4
16	Michael Vissing	3

Semi-finals

- 8 May 2009, held at Randers

Pos.	Rider	Points
1	Patrick Hougaard (Holstebro)	13
2	Morten Risager (Slangerup)	13
3	Leon Madsen (Brovst)	12
4	Claus Vissing (Fjelsted)	11
5	Henning Bager (Grindsted)	10
6	Michael Jepsen Jensen (Holsted)	9
7	Nicolai Klindt (Holsted)	9
8	Kenneth Hansen (Slangerup)	7
9	René Bach (Fjelsted)	7
10	Patrick Nørgaard (Vojens)	6
11	Simon Nielsen (Fjelsted)	6
12	Krister Jacobsen (Esbjerg)	5
13	Klaus Jakobsen (Vojens)	5
14	Jesper Kristiansen (Grindsted)	3
15	Jesper Søgaard-Kristiansen (Slangerup)	3
16	Patrick Bjerregaard (Holsted)	2
17	Lasse Bjerre (Vojens)	0

Final series

Round one

- 22 May 2009 held at Vojens Speedway Center

Pos.	Rider	Points	Details
1	Kenneth Bjerre	14	(3,3,2,3,3)
2	Nicki Pedersen	14	(3,3,3,3,2)
3	Hans N. Andersen	11	(X,3,3,2,3)
4	Niels Kristian Iversen	10	(2,2,3,1,2)
5	Nicolai Klindt	9	(3,2,3,E,1)
6	Leon Madsen	9	(2,0,2,2,3)
7	Morten Risager	9	(3,2,1,2,1)
8	Jesper B. Monberg	8	(2,1,0,3,2)
9	Patrick Hougaard	7	(1,2,1,X,3)
10	Mads Korneliussen	7	(1,1,1,2,2)
11	Bjarne Pedersen	6	(0,3,2,1,0)
12	Ulrich Østergaard	4	(F,0,0,3,1)
13	Michael Jepsen Jensen	4	(1,0,2,T,1)
14	Henning Bager	4	(1,1,1,1,0)
15	Claus Vissing	3	(2,X,0,1,0)
16	Charlie Gjedde	1	(0,1,0,0,0)
17	Kenneth Hansen	0	(-,-,0,-,-)

Round two

- 7 August 2009, held at Fjelsted

Pos.	Rider	Points	Details
1	Nicki Pedersen	18	(3,3,3,3,3,3)
2	Hans N. Andersen	14	(3,3,3,3,2,0)
3	Niels Kristian Iversen	13	(3,3,2,1,3,1)
4	Kenneth Bjerre	11	(2,2,3,0,2,2)
5	Patrick Hougaard	9	(1,1,2,3,2)
6	Nicolai Klindt	8	(2,1,1,3,1)
7	Ulrich Østergaard	8	(3,3,1,1,0)
8	Michael Jepsen Jensen	7	(0,1,3,2,1)
9	Mads Korneliussen	7	(1,2,1,2,1)
10	Morten Risager	7	(2,2,E,0,3)
11	René Bach	6	(1,0,0,2,3)
12	Henning Bager	5	(2,2,0,1,0)
13	Jesper B. Monberg	5	(0,1,0,2,2)
14	Leon Madsen	4	(0,F,2,1,1)
15	Kenneth Hansen	3	(1,0,2,0,0,)
16	Claus Vissing	0	(0,0,F,-,-)
17	Simon Nielsen	0	(-,-,-,0,0)

Final classification

Pos.	Rider	Points		
1	Nicki Pedersen (Holsted)	32	14	18
2	Kenneth Bjerre (Vojens)	25	14	11
3	Hans N. Andersen (Slangerup)	25	11	14
4	Niels Kristian Iversen (Esbjerg)	23	10	13
5	Nicolai Klindt (Holsted)	17	9	8
6	Morten Risager (Slangerup)	16	9	7
-	Patrick Hougaard (Holsted)	16	7	9
8	Mads Korneliussen (Esbjerg)	14	7	7
9	Leon Madsen (Holstebro)	13	9	4
10	Jesper B. Monberg (Slangerup)	13	8	5
11	Ulrich Østergaard (Brovst)	12	4	8
12	Michael Jepsen Jensen (Vojens)	11	4	7
13	Henning Bager (Grinsted)	9	4	5
14	Bjarne Pedersen (Holstebro)	6	6	–
-	René Bach (Fjelsted)	6	–	6
16	Claus Vissing (Fjelsted)	3	3	0
-	Kenneth Hansen (Slangerup)	3	0	3
18	Charlie Gjedde (Grinsted)	1	1	–
19	Simon Nielsen (Holsted)	0	–	0

=== U21 Championship ===
Patrick Hougaard won the U21 Championship for the second time. The final was held at Glumso on 16 August.

Pos.	Rider	Points
1	Patrick Hougaard	14+3
2	Nicolai Klindt	13+2
3	Kenni Arendt Larsen	13+1
4	Leon Madsen	13+0
5	Michael Jepsen Jensen	11
6	Patrick Nørgaard	10
7	René Bach	8
8	Simon Nielsen	7
9	Peter Kildemand	7
10	Casper Wortmann	6
11	Michael Palm Toft	6
12	Tommy Pedersen	5
13	Steffen B. Jespersen	2
14	Mads Skov	2
15	Nicki Barrett	2
16	Peter Juul Larsen	0

== Team ==
=== Danish Speedway League ===
The Danish Speedway League was won by Holsted Tigers for the 13th time.

Pos	Team	P	W	D	L	Pts
1	Holsted Tigers	14	12	0	2	45
2	Slangerup	14	10	0	4	39
3	Brovst	14	9	1	4	38
4	Holstebro	14	7	0	7	31
5	Vojens	14	4	1	9	26
6	Esbjerg Vikings	14	5	0	9	26
7	Fjelsted	14	5	0	9	25
8	Grindsted	14	3	0	11	22

== Teams ==
Brovst

- (Poland) Adrian Miedziński
- (Poland) Rafał Dobrucki
- (Denmark) Leon Madsen
- (Poland) Daniel Pytel
- (Denmark) Thomas Jørgensen
- (Denmark) Jonas B. Andersen
- (Denmark) Steen Jensen
- (Czech Republic) Zdeněk Simota
- (Denmark) Ulrich Østergaard

Esbjerg

- (Denmark) Niels Kristian Iversen
- (Poland) Tomasz Gollob
- (Poland) Piotr Protasiewicz
- (Poland) Zbigniew Suchecki
- (Poland) Piotr Świst
- (Denmark) Michael Palm Toft
- (Denmark) Brian Lyngsö
- (Denmark) Johannes Kikkenborg
- (Denmark) Dannie Soderholm
- (Denmark) Krister Jacobsen

Fjelsted

- (Denmark) Peter Kildemand
- (Denmark) Claus Vissing
- (Poland) Sebastian Ułamek
- (Denmark) Nicki Barrett
- (Slovenia) Samo Kukovica
- (Poland) Dawid Stachyra
- (Denmark) René Bach
- (Denmark) Steffen Andersen
- (Denmark) Marc Randrup

Grindsted

- (Denmark) Henning Bager
- (Denmark) Charlie Gjedde
- (Denmark) Mads E. Skov
- (Denmark) Peter Juul Larsen
- (Sweden) Linus Sundström
- (Denmark) Steffen Jepersen
- (Denmark) Jesper Søgaard-Kristiansen

Holstebro

- (Denmark) Bjarne Pedersen
- (Ukraine) Andriej Karpov
- (Denmark) Kenni Arendt Larsen
- (Poland) Artur Mroczka
- (Denmark) Tommy Pedersen
- (Denmark) Claes Nedermark

Holsted

- (Denmark) Nicki Pedersen
- (Denmark) Patrick Hougaard
- (Denmark) Nicklas Porsing
- (Denmark) Nicolai Klindt
- (Denmark) Henrik Møller
- (Denmark) Patrick Bjerregaard
- (Denmark) Simon Nielsen
- (Denmark) Jeppe Schmidt

Slangerup

- (Denmark) Jesper B. Monberg
- (Denmark) Kenneth Kruse Hansen
- (Denmark) Morten Risager
- (Denmark) Hans Andersen
- (Denmark) Philip Marchéwka Tirsdal
- (Denmark) Henrik Vedel

Vojens

- (Denmark) Michael Jepsen Jensen
- (Russia) Emil Sayfutdinov
- (Denmark) Kenneth Bjerre
- (Germany) Kevin Wölbert
- (Denmark) Patrick Nørgaard
- (Denmark) Casper Wortmann
- (Denmark) Klaus Jakobsen
- (Sweden) Dennis Andersson
- (Sweden) Robin Tornqvist
