= 2013 Team Speedway Junior European Championship =

2013 motorcycle competition

Seasons
- ← 2012 2014 →

The 2013 Team Speedway Junior European Championship was the sixth Team Speedway Junior European Championship season. It was the first time that it was organised by the Fédération Internationale de Motocyclisme and was the second as an under 21 years of age event.

The final took place on 6 July 2013 in Opole, Poland. The defending champions Poland won the final easily with 50 points.

== Results ==
=== Final ===
- (Poland) Opole
- 6 July 2013

Pos.	National team	Pts.	Scorers
1	Poland	50	Piotr Pawlicki 12, Bartosz Zmarzlik 11, Krystian Pieszczek 10, Artur Czaja 9, Paweł Przedpełski 8
2	Denmark	30	Nikolaj Busk Jakobsen 9, Anders Thomsen 9, Kenni Nissen 6, Rasmus Jensen 5, Emil Grondal 2
3	Czech Republic	27	Václav Milík Jr. 10, Roman Cejka 6, Eduard Krčmář 5, Michal Skurla 3, Zdeněk Holub 3
4	Ukraine	13	Aleksandr Loktaev 8, Stanislav Melnichuk 3, Pavel Kondratyuk 2, Maxim Rososhchuk 0

== See also ==
- 2013 Team Speedway Junior World Championship
- 2013 Individual Speedway Junior European Championship
