= 2015 Team Speedway Junior European Championship =

2015 motorcycle competition

Seasons
- ← 2014 2016 →

The 2015 Team Speedway Junior European Championship was the eighth Team Speedway Junior European Championship season. It was organised by the Fédération Internationale de Motocyclisme and was the fourth as an under 21 years of age event.

The final took place on 12 September 2015 in Plzeň, Czech Republic. The defending champions Poland won the final once again to record their fourth consecutive title win but were pushed all the way by Sweden, who finished just one point behind.

== Results ==
=== Final ===
- (Czech Republic) Plzeň speedway track, Plzeň
- 12 September 2015

| Pos. | National team | Pts. | Scorers |
|---|---|---|---|
| 1 | Poland | 35 | Krystian Pieszczek 10, Adrian Cyfer 10, Kacper Woryna 9, Bartosz Smektała 4, Krystian Rempała 2 |
| 2 | Sweden | 34 | Joel Andersson 10, Victor Palovaara 9, Kenny Wennerstam 8, Fredrik Engman 7, John Lindman 0 |
| 3 | Denmark | 30 | Emil Grondal 11, Patrick Hansen 9, Andreas Lyager 4, Mikkel B. Andersen 4, Frederik Jakobsen 3 |
| 4 | Czech Republic | 19 | Zdeněk Holub 8, Eduard Krčmář 6, Patrik Mikel 2, Ondřej Smetana 2, Michal Skurla 1 |

== See also ==
- 2015 Team Speedway Junior World Championship
- 2015 Individual Speedway Junior European Championship
