= 2014 Team Speedway Junior European Championship =

2014 motorcycle competition

Seasons
- ← 2013 2015 →

The 2014 Team Speedway Junior European Championship was the seventh Team Speedway Junior European Championship season. It was organised by the Fédération Internationale de Motocyclisme and was the third as an under 21 years of age event.

The final took place on 28 June 2014 at the Sandbahn Rennen Herxheim in Herxheim, Germany. The defending champions Poland won the final easily with 49 points to seal three consecutive titles.

== Results ==
=== Final ===
- (Germany) Sandbahn Rennen Herxheim, Herxheim
- 28 June 2014

Pos.	National team	Pts.	Scorers
1	Poland	49	Bartosz Zmarzlik 12, Piotr Pawlicki Jr. 11, Paweł Przedpełski 10, Krystian Pieszczek 9, Adrian Cyfer 8
2	Denmark	28	Nikolaj Busk Jakobsen 7, Anders Thomsen 7, Mikkel Breum Andersen 6, Kasper Lykke Nielsen 6, Jonas Andersen 2
3	Czech Republic	25	Václav Milík Jr. 10, Eduard Krčmář 9, Zdeněk Holub 4, Ondřej Smetana 2, Roman Cejka 0
4	Germany	18	Kai Huckenbeck 7, Erik Riss 5, Valentin Grobauer 5, Mark Riss 1, Daniel Spiller 0

== See also ==
- 2014 Team Speedway Junior World Championship
- 2014 Individual Speedway Junior European Championship
