= 2013 Speedway Under-21 World Championship =

World motorcycle speedway event

World Under-21 Championship
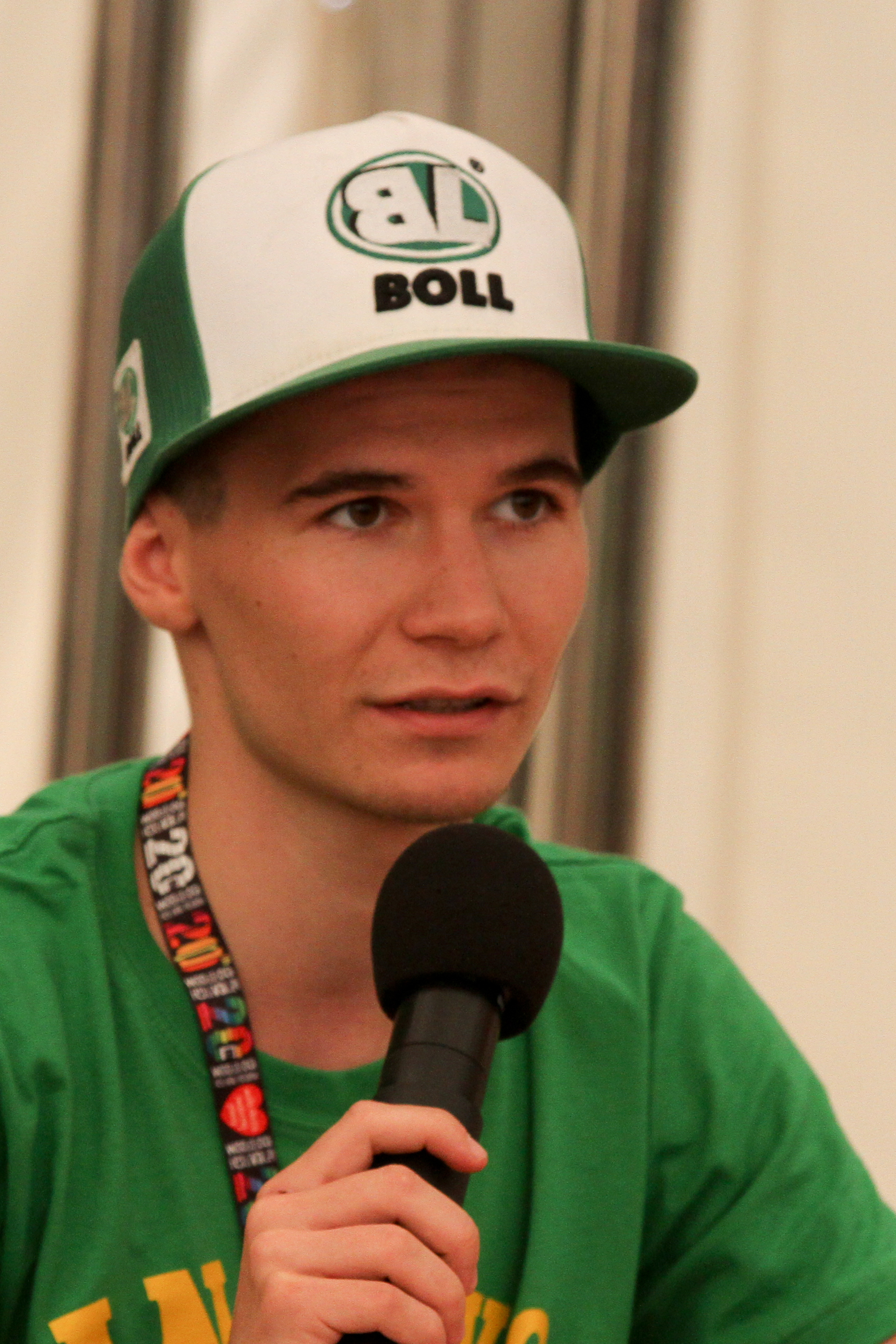
- Patryk Dudek

The 2013 Individual Speedway Junior World Championship was the 37th edition of the FIM World motorcycle speedway Under-21 Championships.

The competition retained the 'Grand Prix' style format, but was reduced from seven to three rounds, which took place in June, August and September. It was won by Poland's Patryk Dudek.

== Final series ==
#	Date	Venue	Winners	Runner-up	3rd place
1	29 June	(Poland) Stadion Polonii Piła, Piła	(Poland) Patryk Dudek	(Poland) Kacper Gomolski	(Latvia) Andrej Lebedev
2	10 August	(England) Shielfield Park, Berwick-upon-Tweed	(Poland) Piotr Pawlicki Jr.	(Poland) Kacper Gomolski	(Czech Republic) Václav Milík, Jr.
3	14 September	(Italy) Pista Olimpia Terenzano, Terenzano	(Poland) Piotr Pawlicki Jr.	(Denmark) Mikkel Bech Jensen	(Poland) Patryk Dudek

== Classification ==
The meeting classification was according to the points scored during the meeting (heats 1–20). The total points scored by each rider during each final meeting (heat 1–20) were credited also as World Championship points. The FIM Speedway Under 21 World Champion was the rider having collected most World Championship points at the end of the series. In case of a tie between one or more riders in the final overall classification, a run-off will decide the 1st, 2nd and 3rd place. For all other placings, the better-placed rider in the last final meeting will be the better placed rider.

Pos.	Rider	Points	(Poland)	(Scotland)	(Italy)
Gold	(Poland) Patryk Dudek	35	14	10	11
Silver	(Poland) Piotr Pawlicki Jr.	34	10	12	12
Bronze	(Poland) Kacper Gomolski	29	11	11	7
4	(Latvia) Andžejs Ļebedevs	28	11	7	10
5	(Denmark) Mikkel Michelsen	26	8	8	10
6	(Czech Republic) Václav Milík, Jr.	24	6	11	7
7	(Denmark) Mikkel Bech Jensen	23	5	7	11
8	(Poland) Bartosz Zmarzlik	22	8	8	6
9	(Poland) Adam Strzelec	22	8	6	8
10	(Poland) Artur Czaja	19	3	8	8
11	(Denmark) Nicklas Porsing	17	8	4	5
12	(Denmark) Nikolaj Busk Jakobsen	15	6	0	9
13	(Poland) Tobiasz Musielak	15	8	–	7
14	(United Kingdom) Kyle Howarth	11	1	10	–
15	(Russia) Wladimir Borodulin	10	10	–	–
16	(Denmark) Lasse Bjerre	10	3	7	–
17	(France) David Bellego	8	–	8	–
18	(Italy) Nicolas Vicentin	6	–	–	6
19	(United Kingdom) Joe Jacobs	2	–	2	–
20	(Italy) Michele Paco Castagna	2	–	–	2
21	(United Kingdom) Adam Ellis	1	–	1	–
22	(Italy) Gianfranco Rissone	1	–	–	1
23	(United Kingdom) Liam Carr	0	–	0	–

== See also ==
- 2013 Speedway Grand Prix
- 2013 Team Speedway Junior World Championship
