= 2011 Individual Speedway Junior European Championship =

Motorcycle racing competition

Seasons
- ← 2010 2012 →

The 2011 European Individual Speedway Junior Championship was the 14th edition of the Championship.

== Qualification ==
- Semi-Final 1:
  - May 7, 2011
  - (Germany) Gustrow
- Semi-Final 2:
  - June 16, 2011
  - (Poland) Krosno
- Semi-Final 3:
  - June 23, 2011
  - (Ukraine) Rivne Speedway Stadium, Rivne
- Scandinavian Final (Semi-Final 4):
  - July 7, 2011
  - (Finland) Seinajoki

=== SF 1 - Gustrow ===
- 7 May 2011
- (Germany) Gustrow

Pos.	Rider	Points	Details
1	(Poland) (4) Piotr Pawlicki Jr.	15	(3,3,3,3,3)
2	(Poland) (10) Kacper Gomólski	14	(3,3,2,3,3)
3	(Germany) (9) Danny Maaben	13	(2,3,3,2,3)
4	(Germany) (1) Kai Huckenbeck	10+3	(2,2,1,3,2)
5	(Poland) (6) Szymon Woźniak	10+2	(3,1,2,1,3)
6	(Czech Republic) (11) Roman Ceijka	10+1	(1,1,3,3,2)
7	(France) (7) David Bellego	9	(1,3,1,2,2)
8	(Germany) (8) Andre Mochner	8	(2,2,2,1,1)
9	(United Kingdom) (2) Ashley Morris	6	(0,A,3,2,1)
10	(Italy) (5) Michele Paco Castagna	6	(0,1,2,2,1)
11	(United Kingdom) (14) Brendan Johnson	6	(2,2,1,1,N)
12	(France) (13) Xavier Muratet	5	(3,0,0,0,2)
13	(Poland) (3) Oskar Fajfer	3	(1,2,S,N,N)
14	(Czech Republic) (15) Jaroslav Hladky	2	(1,0,1,0,0)
15	(Germany) (12) Nils Hesse	2	(0,1,0,0,1)
16	(Germany) (16) Steven Mauer		

=== SF 2 - Krosno ===
- 18 June 2011
- (Poland) Krosno

Pos.	Rider	Points	Details
1	(Poland) (4) Bartosz Zmarzlik	15	(3,3,3,3,3)
2	(Poland) (11) Tobiasz Musielak	13+3	(3,3,3,3,1)
3	(Poland) (14) Artur Czaja	13+2	(3,3,3,2,2)
4	(Latvia) (1) Andžejs Ļebedevs	12+3	(1,3,2,3,3)
5	(Russia) (3) Vladimir Borodulin	12+2	(2,2,2,3,3)
6	(Russia) (6) Ilya Chalov	8	(1,2,1,2,2)
7	(Czech Republic) (9) Ondrej Veverka	8	(2,2,1,1,2)
8	(Germany) (13) Michell Hofmann	8	(2,1,2,2,1)
9	(United Kingdom) (16) Tom Perry	7	(S,2,0,2,3)
10	(Poland) (12) Mateusz Domanski	6	(1,1,3,1,D)
11	(Ukraine) (8) Vladimir Teygal	5	(2,D,0,1,2)
12	(Poland) (7) Emil Pulczynski	4	(3,1,A,N,N)
13	(Czech Republic) (2) Ondrej Smetana	3	(0,1,1,0,1)
14	(Latvia) (5) Ivan Pleshakov	3	(0,0,2,1,A)
15	(Slovenia) (15) Ladislav Vida	1	(1,0,0,A,A)
16	(Slovenia) (10) Kristian Revinšek	0	(0,S,N,N,N)
17	(Poland) (17) Mateusz Wieczorek	1	(1,0,0,A,A)

== Final ==
- 9 July 2011
- (Slovenia) Ljubljana

Pos.	Rider	Points
1	(Poland) Piotr Pawlicki Jr.	14
2	(Denmark) Michael Jepsen Jensen	12+3
3	(Russia) Vitaly Belousov	12+2
4	(Poland) Szymon Woźniak	12+1
5	(Poland) Tobiasz Musielak	9
6	(Poland) Bartosz Zmarzlik	9
7	(Denmark) Mikkel Bech	8
8	(Denmark) Jonas B. Andersen	8
9	(Germany) Kai Huckenbeck	7
10	(Croatia) Dino Kovacic	6
11	(Czech Republic) Václav Milík Jr.	6
12	(Poland) Mikołaj Curyło	5
13	(Latvia) Andžejs Ļebedevs	4
14	(Poland) Artur Czaja	3
15	(Germany) Danny Maassen	3
16	(Slovenia) Matic Ivacic	1

== See also ==
- 2011 Team Speedway Junior European Championship
- 2011 Individual Speedway European Championship
