= 2016 Individual Speedway Junior European Championship =

Motorcycle racing competition

2016 European Individual Speedway Junior Championship

Seasons
- ← 2015 2017 →

The 2016 European Individual Speedway Junior Championship (also known as the 2016 Speedway European Under 21 Championship) was the 19th edition of the Championship.

The final was staged at the Piste de Speedway de Lamothe Landerron, in France and was won by Dimitri Bergé,

== Final ==
- 10 September 2016
- (France) Lamothe-Landerron

Pos.	Rider	Points	Details
1	(France) Dimitri Bergé	13+3	(3,1,3,3,3)
2	(Czech Republic) Eduard Krčmář	13+2	(2,3,2,3,2)
3	(Russia) Sergey Logachev	12	(3,3,1,2,3)
4	(Sweden) Joel Andersson	11	(3,2,1,2,3)
5	(Germany) Erik Riss	10	(0,3,3,3,1)
6	(Denmark) Mikkel B. Andersen	9	(2,3,2,0,2)
7	(Denmark) Andreas Lyager	9	(2,2,3,1,1)
8	(Denmark) Frederik Jakobsen	9	(1,2,2,2,2)
9	(Poland) Bartosz Smektała	8	(2,0,2,1,3)
10	(Czech Republic) Zdeněk Holub	7	(3,1,1,2,0)
11	(Poland) Daniel Kaczmarek	6	(1,0,1,1,3)
12	(Finland) Jooa Partanen	5	(0,3,D,2,0)
13	(Ukraine) Viktor Trofimov Jr.	5	(1,1,1,1,1)
14	(Norway) Lasse Fredriksen	2	(1,1,0,0,0)
15	(Slovenia) Nick Škorja	3	(W,W,0,0,1)
16	(Russia) Arsłan Fajzulin	0	(0,0,W,0,0)
	(Germany) Michael Hartel	DNR	
	(Russia) Gleb Chugunov	DNR	

== See also ==
- 2016 Speedway European Championship
