= European Individual Speedway Junior Championship =

European Individual Speedway Junior Championship may refer to:

- European Under-19 Individual Speedway Championship
- European Under-21 Individual Speedway Championship
