= Ondřej Smetana =

Ondřej Smetana may refer to:

- Ondřej Smetana (footballer) (born 1982), Czech footballer
- Ondřej Smetana (speedway rider), Czech speedway rider
