= 2014 Individual Speedway Junior European Championship =

Motorcycle racing competition

Seasons
- ← 2013 2015 →

The 2014 Individual Speedway Junior European Championship (also known as the 2014 Speedway European Under 21 Championship) was the 17th edition of the Championship.

The final was staged at Rybnik in Poland and was won by Václav Milík Jr., the second rider from the Czech Republic to do so. He won the final with a 15-point maximum.

== Final - Rybnik ==
- 27 September 2014
- (Poland) Rybnik

Pos.	Rider	Points
1	(Czech Republic) Václav Milík Jr.	15
2	(Poland) Kacper Woryna	14
3	(Latvia) Andžejs Ļebedevs	11+3
4	(Denmark) Jonas B.Andersen	11+2
5	(Denmark) Nikolaj Busk Jakobsen	10
6	(Poland) Adrian Cyfer	9
7	(France) David Bellego	9
8	(Denmark) Kasper Lykke Nielsen	9
9	(Czech Republic) Eduard Krčmář	8
10	(Czech Republic) Zdeněk Holub	7
11	(Poland) Hubert Łęgowik	6
12	(Poland) Paweł Przedpełski	4
13	(Italy) Michele Paco Castagna	3
14	(Denmark) Kenni Nissen	2
15	(Germany) Valentin Grobauer	0
16	(Sweden) Victor Palovaara	0

== See also ==
- 2014 Speedway European Championship
