= 2015 Individual Speedway Junior European Championship =

Motorcycle racing competition

2015 European Individual Speedway Junior Championship

Seasons
- ← 2014 2016 →

The 2015 European Individual Speedway Junior Championship (also known as the 2015 Speedway European Under 21 Championship) was the 18th edition of the Championship.

The final was staged at Silkeborg in Denmark and was won by Anders Thomsen, the fourth rider from Denmark to do so. He held off compatriot Nikolaj Busk Jakobsen to win by one point, with Poland's Bartosz Smektała taking third place.

== Final ==
- 30 August 2015
- (Denmark) Silkeborg

Pos.	Rider	Points	Details
1	(Denmark) Anders Thomsen	14	(3,2,3,3,3)
2	(Denmark) Nikolaj Busk Jakobsen	13	(3,1,3,3,3)
3	(Poland) Bartosz Smektała	12	(3,3,1,2,3)
4	(Poland) Maksym Drabik	8	(3,W,3,W,2)
5	(Germany) Erik Riss	8	(1,3,1,3,0)
6	(Latvia) Andžejs Ļebedevs	8	(D,1,3,3,1)
7	(Sweden) John Lindman	8	(0,3,2,2,1)
8	(Russia) Viktor Kulakov	8	(2,2,2,0,2)
9	(Poland) Kacper Woryna	7	(2,3,W,D,2)
10	(United Kingdom) Adam Ellis	7	(1,1,2,W,3)
11	(Sweden) Victor Palovaara	7	(2,2,W,2,1)
12	(Poland) Krystian Rempała	7	(2,2,W,1,2)
13	(Czech Republic) Zdeněk Holub	5	(1,1,1,2,0)
14	(Denmark) Jesper Scharff	3	(0,0,2,1,0)
15	(Poland) Ernest Koza	3	(1,0,0,1,1)
16	(Denmark) Mikkel B. Andersen	0	(W,0,T,0,0)
17	(Czech Republic) Eduard Krčmář	0	(0)
	(Latvia) Jevgeņijs Kostigovs	DNR	

== See also ==
- 2015 Speedway European Championship
