= European Under-21 Individual Speedway Championship =

Annual European motorcycle speedway event

European Under-21 Individual Championship
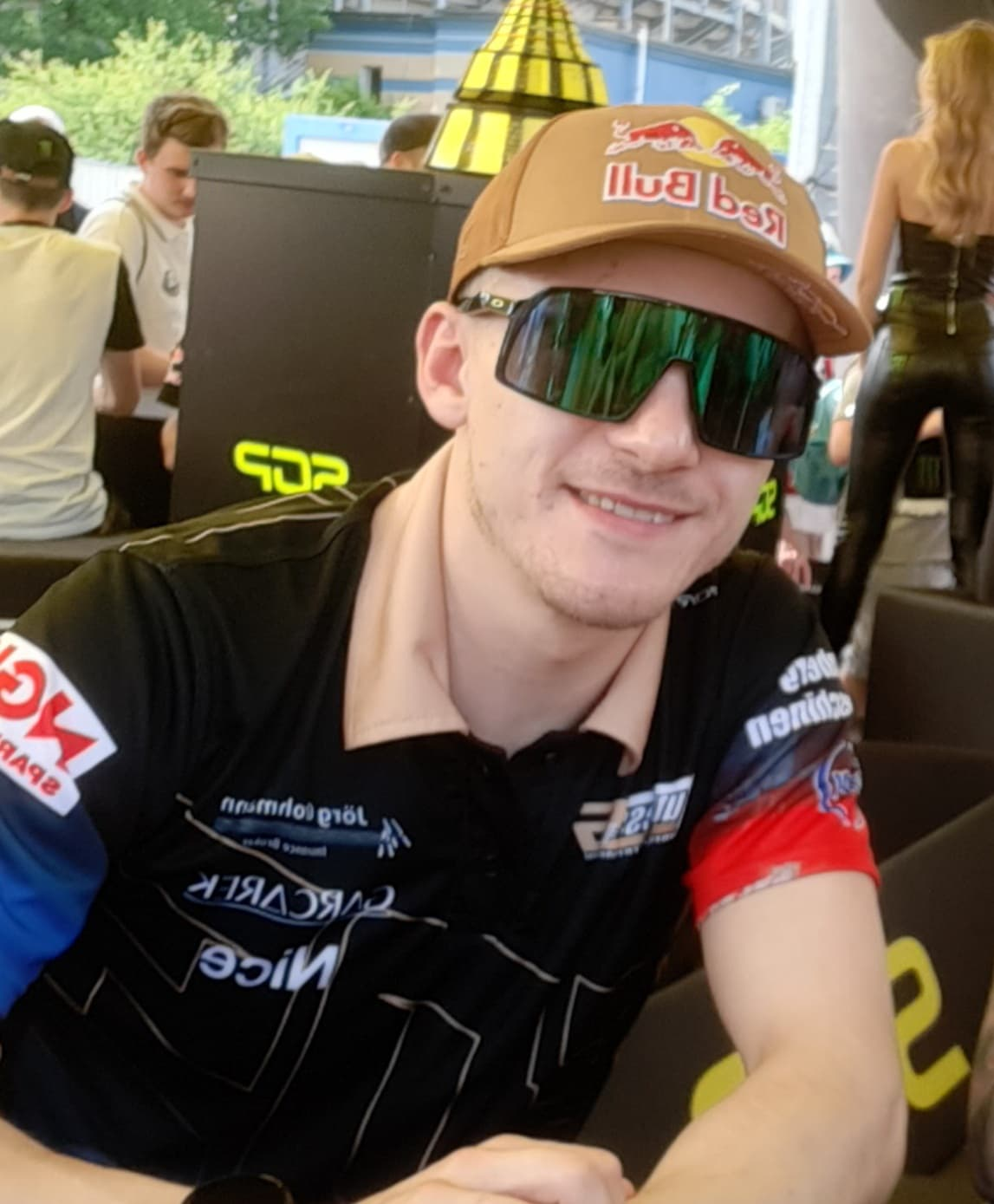
- 2017 champion Robert Lambert

The European Under-21 Individual Speedway Championship was an annual speedway event organised by FIM Europe (formerly the European Motorcycle Union (UEM)) from 1977 to 1988 and again from 2013 to 2020.

== Championship history ==
Between 1977 and 1988 the FIM organised the European Under-21 Championship. After deciding to allow non-European competitors, the competition was renamed the Speedway Under-21 World Championship.

The European U21 Championship returned between 2013 and 2020, when the European Under-19 Individual Speedway Championship was expanded to include riders up to the age of 21 years of age.

The under-21 event was discontinued in 2021.

== Past Winners ==
Year	Venue	Winners	2nd place	3rd place
FIM
1977	(Denmark) Vojens	(Denmark) Alf Busk	(England) Joe Owen	(England) Les Collins
1978	(Italy) Lonigo	(Denmark) Finn Rune Jensen	(England) Kevin Jolly	(England) Neil Middleditch
1979	(Soviet Union) Leningrad	(United States) Ron Preston	(Soviet Union) Airat Faizulin	(Finland) Ari Koponen
1980	(Germany) Pocking	(Denmark) Tommy Knudsen	(New Zealand) Tony Briggs	(United States) Dennis Sigalos
1981	(Czechoslovakia) Slaný	(United States) Shawn Moran	(Czechoslovakia) Antonín Kasper Jr.	(Czechoslovakia) Jiří Hnidak
1982	(Germany) Pocking	(Czechoslovakia) Antonín Kasper Jr.	(England) Mark Courtney	(Denmark) Peter Ravn
1983	(Italy) Lonigo	(Australia) Steve Baker	(New Zealand) David Bargh	(England) Marvyn Cox
1984	(England) King's Lynn	(England) Marvyn Cox	(England) Neil Evitts	(United States) Steve Lucero
1985	(Germany) Abensberg	(Sweden) Per Jonsson	(Sweden) Jimmy Nilsen	(Denmark) Ole Hansen
1986	(Soviet Union) Rivne	(Soviet Union) Igor Marko	(Sweden) Tony Olsson	(Denmark) Brian Karger
1987	(Poland) Zielona Góra	(England) Gary Havelock	(Poland) Piotr Świst	(England) Sean Wilson
FIM Europe
2013	(Germany) Güstrow	(Denmark) Mikkel Michelsen	(Latvia) Andžejs Ļebedevs	(France) David Bellego
2014	(Poland) Rybnik	(Czech Republic) Václav Milík, Jr.	(Poland) Kacper Woryna	(Latvia) Andžejs Ļebedevs
2015	(Denmark) Silkeborg	(Denmark) Anders Thomsen	(Denmark) Nikolaj Busk Jakobsen	(Poland) Bartosz Smektała
2016	(France) Lamothe-Landerron	(France) Dimitri Bergé	(Czech Republic) Eduard Krčmář	(Russia) Sergey Logachev
2017	(Latvia) Daugavpils	(England) Robert Lambert	(Poland) Bartosz Smektała	(Denmark) Andreas Lyager
2018	(Germany) Stralsund	(Poland) Dominik Kubera	(Poland) Wiktor Lampart	(Denmark) Frederik Jakobsen
2019	(Ukraine) Rivne	(Poland) Wiktor Lampart	(Russia) Roman Lachbaum	(Denmark) Mads Hansen
2020	(Poland) Gdańsk	(Denmark) Marcus Birkemose	(Poland) Jakub Miśkowiak	(Sweden) Alexander Woentin
