= 2012 Individual Speedway Junior European Championship =

Motorcycle racing competition

Seasons
- ← 2011 2013 →

The 2012 European Individual Speedway Junior Championship was the 15th edition of the Championship.

== Final ==
- 25 August 2012
- (Poland) Opole

Pos.	Rider	Points
1	(Poland) Bartosz Zmarzlik	14
2	(Poland) Tobiasz Musielak	13
3	(Denmark) Mikkel Michelsen	12
4	(Poland) Łukasz Sówka	10
5	(Poland) Piotr Pawlicki Jr.	10
6	(Denmark) Rasmus Jensen	9
7	(Latvia) Andžejs Ļebedevs	9
8	(Czech Republic) Václav Milík Jr.	8
9	(Poland) Kacper Gomólski	7
10	(Sweden) Oliver Berntzon	6
11	(Czech Republic) Eduard Krčmář	5
12	(Ukraine) Kirył Cukanow	5
13	(England) Kyle Newman	5
14	(Denmark) Nicklas Porsing	3
15	(Czech Republic) Ondřej Smetana	2
16	(Ukraine) Wołodymir Tejgeł	1

== See also ==
- 2012 Team Speedway Junior European Championship
- 2012 Speedway European Championship
