= MJJ =

MJJ may refer to:

- Michael Jackson (Michael Joseph Jackson), American singer-songwriter
- Michael Jordan (Michael Jeffrey Jordan), American professional basketball player
- Michael Jepsen Jensen, Danish speedway rider
- MJJ – the record company Michael Jackson owned which was folded before it was folded in 2001
- May, June, July, a 3-month season period
