= 2013 Team Speedway Junior World Championship =

Motorcycle racing competition

Seasons
- ← 2012 2014 →

The 2013 Team Speedway Junior World Championship was the ninth FIM Team Under-21 World Championship season. The final took place on 28 September, 2013 in Pardubice, Czech Republic.

Denmark won their second Team Under-21 World Championship. The Danes accumulated 42 points, with Michael Jepsen Jensen top scoring for them with 16 points. Poland finished just one point behind in second with 41 points, while hosts Czech Republic finished third with 24 points.

== Semi-finals ==
- (Poland) Gdańsk
- 25 May 2013

National team	Pts
Poland	47
Russia	34
Sweden	26
Great Britain	14

- (Austria) Wiener Neustadt
- 25 May 2013

National team	Pts
Denmark	53
Australia	42
Germany	25
United States	4

== Final ==
- (Czech Republic) Pardubice
- 28 September 2013

Pos.	National team	Pts.
1	Denmark	42
2	Poland	41
3	Czech Republic	24
4	Australia	20

== Scores ==
(Denmark)	DENMARK	42
No	Rider Name	Pts.	Heats
1	Michael Jepsen Jensen	16	1,3,3,6,0,3
2	Mikkel Michelsen	11	3,3,2,2,1
3	Mikkel Bech Jensen	8	3,0,D,2,3
4	Nicklas Porsing	7	1,2,1,-,3

(Poland)	POLAND	41
No	Rider Name	Pts.	Heats
1	Patryk Dudek	10	2,1,3,2,2
2	Paweł Przedpełski	10	2,2,3,1,2
3	Piotr Pawlicki Jr.	8	2,3,2,1,W
4	Bartosz Zmarzlik	13	3,3,3,1,3

(Czech Republic)	CZECH REPUBLIC	24
No	Rider Name	Pts.	Heats
1	Václav Milík	16	1,2,2,6,3,2
2	Zdeněk Holub	3	0,1,1,0,1
3	Roman Čejka	1	0,0,1,-,0
4	Eduard Krčmář	4	0,2,0,2,0

(Australia)	AUSTRALIA	20
No	Rider Name	Pts.	Heats
1	Tyson Nelson	2	1,0,0,1,0
2	Darcy Ward	11	3,2,1,3,2
3	Alex Davies	3	0,1,2,0,1
4	Nick Morris	3	2,0,0,0,1

== See also ==
- 2013 Speedway World Cup
- 2013 Individual Speedway Junior World Championship
