= 2017 Individual Speedway Junior European Championship =

Motorcycle racing competition

The 2017 European Individual Speedway Junior Championship (also known as the 2017 Speedway European Under 21 Championship) was the 20th edition of the U21 Championship. It was won by Robert Lambert.

Lambert also won the U19 title.

== Under 21 ==
The final was staged at Daugavpils in Latvia and was won by Robert Lambert of England.

=== Final ===
- 26 August 2017
- (Latvia) Daugavpils

Pos.	Rider	Points
1	(England) Robert Lambert	14
2	(Poland) Bartosz Smektała	12
3	(Denmark) Andreas Lyager	11+3
4	(Russia) Gleb Chugunov	11+2
5	(Denmark) Frederik Jakobsen	9
6	(Poland) Dominik Kubera	9
7	(Germany) Patrick Hansen	8
8	(Sweden) Joel Andersson	8
9	(Germany) Lukas Fienhage	7
10	(Poland) Rafal Karczmarz	6
11	(Slovenia) Nick Škorja	5
12	(Sweden) Kenny Wennerstam	5
13	(Latvia) David Kurmis	5
14	(Denmark) Mikkel B. Andersen	4
15	(Germany) Michael Hartel	4
16	(England) Dan Bewley	2
17	(Czech Republic) Eduard Krčmář	0
18	(Czech Republic) Zdeněk Holub	0

== Under 19 ==
The final was staged at Divišov in Czech Republic and was won by Robert Lambert of England.

=== Final ===
- 12 August 2017
- (Czech Republic) Divišov

Pos.	Rider	Points	Details
1	(England) Robert Lambert	15+3	(3,3,3,3,3)
2	(Sweden) Filip Hjelmland	11+2+2	(3,2,3,U,3)
3	(Poland) Bartosz Smektała	13+1	(3,3,2,3,2)
4	(Germany) Michael Hartel	9+3+0	(3,3,W,2,1)
5	(Poland) Dominik Kubera	10+W	(2,1,1,3,3)
6	(Russia) Gleb Chugunov	8+NS	(2,2,2,2,-)
7	(Denmark) Jonas Seifert-Salk	7	(1,U,3,2,1)
8	(Slovakia) Jakub Valković	7	(1,1,1,1,3)
9	(England) Nathan Greaves	7	(2,1,2,W,2)
10	(Czech Republic) Patrik Mikel	7	(2,2,1,1,1)
11	(Sweden) Alexander Woentin	6	(0,3,1,2,U)
12	(Denmark) Mads Hansen	6	(1,0,3,W,2)
13	(Finland) Niklas Sayrio	4	(1,0,0,3,W)
14	(Germany) Mike Jacopetti	4	(0,2,2,0,0)
15	(Czech Republic) Josef Novak	3	(W,0,0,1,2)
16	(Netherlands) Mika Meijer	2	(0,1,0,1,0)
17	(Czech Republic) Pavel Čermák	1	(1)
	(Czech Republic) Vaclav Kvech	DNR	

== See also ==
- 2017 Speedway European Championship
