= 2013 Individual Speedway Junior European Championship =

Motorcycle racing competition

Seasons
- ← 2012 2014 →

The 2013 European Individual Speedway Junior Championship (also known as the 2013 Speedway European Under 21 Championship) was the 16th edition of the Championship.

The final was staged at Güstrow in Germany and was won by Denmark's Mikkel Michelsen. He scored 13 points, level with Latvian Andžejs Ļebedevs, but won the run-off to claim the title.2013 Final Results.

== Final - Güstrow ==
- 24 August 2013
- (Germany) Güstrow

Pos.	Rider	Points	Details
1	(Denmark) Mikkel Michelsen	13+3	(2,3,2,3,3)
2	(Latvia) Andžejs Ļebedevs	13+2	(3,2,3,3,2)
3	(France) David Bellego	12	(1,3,3,2,3)
4	(Sweden) Oliver Berntzon	11	(1,3,2,3,2)
5	(Poland) Paweł Przedpełski	11	(2,3,3,1,2)
6	(Poland) Artur Czaja	8	(3,F,2,0,3)
7	(Denmark) Rasmus Jensen	8	(0,2,1,2,3)
8	(France) Dimitri Bergé	8	(1,1,1,3,2)
9	(Germany) Valentin Grobauer	7	(3,1,0,2,1)
10	(Poland) Hubert Łęgowik	6	(0,2,3,0,1)
11	(Sweden) Mathias Thörnblom	6	(2,0,2,2,0)
12	(Sweden) Fredrik Engman	5	(3,F,0,1,1)
13	(Germany) René Deddens	3	(2,X,1,1,1)
14	(Italy) Nicolas Vicentin	2	(0,2,0,E,E)
15	(Sweden) Joel Larsson	2	(1,1,0,0,0)
16	(Ukraine) Stanislav Melnichuk	1	(E,0,1,X,0)
17	(Czech Republic) Zdeněk Holub	1	(-,1,-,-,-)

== See also ==
- 2013 Speedway European Championship
