= Nanna Jørgensen =

Danish speedway rider

- Born: 20 November 1989
- Nationality: Denmark

Current club information
- Danish league: Holsted
- Polish league: KM Ostrów Wlkp.

Career history
- ?: Holsted (DEN)
- 2009-: Ostrów Wlkp. (POL)

Nanna W. Jørgensen (born 20 November 1989) is a Danish motorcycle speedway rider, who is the first woman in Polish league.

Jørgensen started since 2007 season in Denmark and Ukraine. In 2008 season, she started in tournament in Tarnów "Eurospeedway" and she beat a few men. Between 2008 and 2009 seasons, there was a change of Polish regulations and since 2009 season woman can start in motorcycle speedway meetings. Jørgensen is the first woman who signed a contract with Polish motorcycle speedway club (KM Ostrów Wielkopolski).

Jørgensen' parents are Steen and Joan. She has one brother Christoffer.

== See also ==
- Speedway in Poland
