= Jonas Raun =

Danish speedway rider

- Born: 22 August 1989 (age 37); Haderslev, Denmark
- Nationality: Danish

Career history

Denmark
- 2005–2006: Holsted
- 2012: Outrup
- 2013: Grindsted

Great Britain
- 2006: Peterborough
- 2007: Newcastle
- 2008: Belle Vue
- 2013: Glasgow

Poland
- 2006: Rawicz

Jonas Lorenzen Raun (born 22 August 1989 in Haderslev, Denmark) is former international motorcycle speedway rider from Denmark.

== Career ==
During the 2005 Danish speedway season, Raun reached the Danish Under 21 final, at age 16, and finished 15th overall.

Raun's first team in the British leagues was Peterborough Panthers, who he rode for during 2006. In 2006, he also rode for Polish third division side Kolejarz Rawicz.

In 2007, Raun rode 32 matches for Newcastle Diamonds achieving an average of 5.50, before crashing in September. After the season with Newcastle, he joined the Belle Vue Aces in the British Elite League.

Raun's last season in British speedway was with the Glasgow Tigers in 2013.
