= Munkebo Speedway Club =

Speedway club in Munkebo, Denmark

Club information
- Track address: Munkebo Speedway Center; Garbækstoften 20, 5330 Munkebo, Kerteminde Municipality; Region of Southern Denmark
- Country: Denmark
- Founded: 1975
- League: Danish Speedway League

Club facts
- Nickname: Scorpions
- Track record time: 58.9 sec
- Track record date: 27 August 2014
- Track record holder: Kenni Larsen

Major team honours
Team champions	2015

Munkebo Speedway Club is a motorcycle speedway club from Munkebo in Denmark. They were champions of Denmark, having won the title in 2015.

== Track ==
The track called the Munkebo Speedway Center is located on the western outskirts of Munkebo, on Garbækstoften 20.

== History ==
=== 1975 to 1984 ===
Munkebo Motor Sport was founded on 1 December 1975 and a few months later they opened a 196-metre mini 50cc speedway track, near the Lindøj Shipyard. The first meeting held there was the 50cc Danish Moped Speedway Championship on 14 August 1976.

A 500cc team was created despite the fact that Munkebo did not have a 500cc track. The team called the Svanerne (the Swans) raced in the Danish tournament, which was the league system in Denmark at the time. However, with no home venue they leased the tracks at Fjelsted and Holsted.

Plans to build a 500cc track had first been explored as early as 1978 but countless issues (from funding to noise objections) had been encountered. Finally in 1984, work started on construction adjacent to the existing mini speedway set up.

=== 1985 to 2012 ===
The track opened on 11 May 1985, one year before the creation of the professional Danish Speedway League or Superliga. In 1988, Munkebo Motor Sport became Munkebo Speedway Club (MSC) and the team continued to compete in the divisions below the Super League. The club gradually grew, built a new clubhouse and hosted the Danish Individual Speedway Championship. They continued to race in the lower leagues for over two decades, by which time the track required major renovation. In 2011, funds were secured and in 2012, the track length was extended to 300 metres to meet international regulations. The 2012 season ended with the team winning division 1 and gaining a place in the Super League for the first time in their history.

=== 2013 to present ===
The team lined up for 2013 season and finished in 7th place. The following season in 2014 they reached the super final, scoring 34 points and finishing the season as runners up behind Holsted. The super final team consisted of Maksims Bogdanovs, Hans Andersen, Mathias Thörnblom, Kasper Lykke Nielsen and Jesper Scharff.

The club's greatest achievement came in 2015 when the team won the league title. Andersen and Scharff were joined by Anders Thomsen, Timo Lahti and Witalij Biełousow in the Super Final.

After the 2017 season they dropped out of the Super League partly due to the Kerteminde Municipality issuing a noise abatement order. However, they continue to race in the lower divisions.

== Notable riders ==
- (Denmark) Hans Andersen
- (Denmark) Kenni Larsen
- (Denmark) AndersThomsen
