= Tobias Thomsen (speedway rider) =

Danish speedway rider

- Born: 23 August 1994 (age 32); Brovst, Denmark
- Nationality: Danish

Career history

Denmark
- 2014–2016, 2018: Region Varde
- 2017: Holstebro
- 2021: Nordjysk

Great Britain
- 2019: Birmingham
- 2024–2025: Poole

Sweden
- 2023–2024: Griparna

Team honours
- 2016, 2018: Danish Speedway League winner
- 2024: tier 2 champions
- 2024: tier 2 KO Cup

Tobias Vangsted Thomsen (born 23 August 1994) is a motorcycle speedway rider from Denmark. He has represented the Danish national team in longtrack.

== Career ==
During the 2016 Danish speedway season and the 2018 Danish speedway season, Thomsen helped contribute towards a league winning season for Region Varde Elitesport.

In 2019, Thomsen first appeared in the British speedway leagues after joining Birmingham Brummies for the SGB Championship 2019 season, where he finished with a 3.93 average. In 2023, he rode for the Danish team in the World longtrack team final.

Thomsen returned to British speedway in 2024, when he signed for the Poole Pirates in their SGB Championship 2024 and knockout cup winning season.
