= Ondřej Smetana (speedway rider) =

Czech speedway rider

- Born: 2 May 1995 (age 31); Prague, Czech Republic
- Nationality: Czech

Individual honours
- 2019: French Individual Speedway Championship

Team honours
- 2014: Team Junior European Championship

Ondřej Smetana (born 2 May 1995) is a Czech motorcycle speedway rider.

== Career ==
As a 16-year-old, Smetana won a bronze medal at the 2011 Speedway Youth World Championship. The following year, he reached the final of the 2012 Individual Speedway Junior European Championship and in 2014 won a bronze medal at the Team Junior European Championship.

Smetana reached the final of the 2016 Speedway Under-21 World Championship. He won the 2019 edition of the French Individual Speedway Championship.

Smetana signed for Newcastle Diamonds for the 2020 season, but due to the COVID-19 pandemic, he was unable to make his British leagues debut.

In 2021, Smetana signed for Poole Pirates, but once again did not make his British debut because of quarantine restrictions relating to COVID-19.
