= Kenneth Hansen (speedway rider) =

Danish speedway rider

- Born: 19 October 1987 (age 39); Herlev, Denmark
- Nationality: Danish

Career history

Denmark
- 2004–2018, 2022–2023: Slangerup
- 2021: Holsted

Sweden
- 2006: Vargarna
- 2022–2024: Griparna
- 2025: Valsarna

Great Britain
- 2007, 2015: Workington
- 2007-2008, 2016: Wolverhampton
- 2009, 2017: Peterborough
- 2014: Coventry
- 2016: King's Lynn

Poland
- 2006: Miskolc
- 2007: Lublin
- 2008: Gorzów
- 2009-2011, 2018: Krosno
- 2012: Daugavpils
- 2013-2015: Kraków
- 2017: Ostrów
- 2020: Rzeszów
- 2022-2023: Tarnów

Individual honours
- 2023: Long Track World Championship bronze medal

Team honours
- 2006: U-21 World Cup bronze medal

Kenneth Kruse Hansen (born 19 October 1987) is a motorcycle speedway rider from Denmark.

== Career ==
Hansen represented Denmark in the 2006 Under-21 Speedway World Cup in Rybnik and won a bronze medal.

Hansen started the 2007 season with the Workington Comets in the Premier League but lost his place after sustaining a broken wrist. He did however reach the final of the Danish Individual Speedway Championship in 2007.

It was announced in 2008 that the Wolverhampton Wolves had signed Hansen on a full contract. He spent both the 2007 and 2008 seasons with the Midlands club before switching to Peterborough Panthers for the 2009 Elite League speedway season.

Hansen concentrated on riding in Poland for the next few years before returning to Britain to ride for the Coventry Bees in the 2014 Elite League speedway season. He would spend two more seasons with Workington in 2015 and 2016 but since 2018, rides in the Danish league, Swedish league and Polish league.

In 2023, Hansen claimed a bronze medal in the 2023 Individual Long Track World Championship.

== Family ==
Hansen's brother-in-law Lars Munkedal was a professional speedway rider.

== See also ==
- Denmark national speedway team
