= Lasse Bjerre =

Danish speedway rider

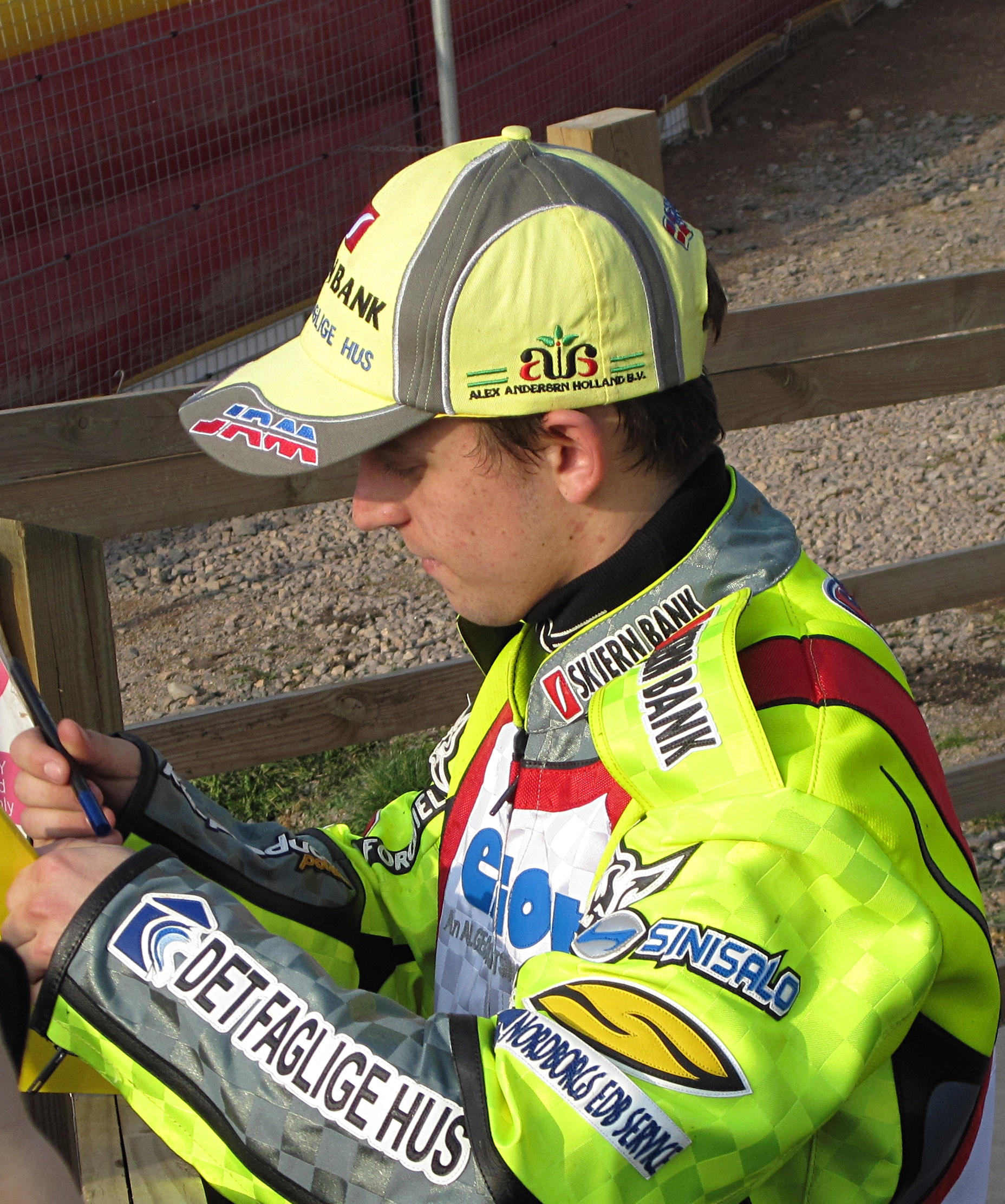
- Born: 31 October 1993 (age 33); Esbjerg, Denmark
- Nationality: Danish

Career history

Denmark
- 2010: Slangerup
- 2011: Grindsted
- 2012–2013, 2021: Outrup/Varde
- 2014, 2019: Fjelsted
- 2015: Munkebo
- 2016–2017: Holstebro
- 2018: Esbjerg
- 2022–2023: Holsted

Great Britain
- 2010–2011, 2013: King's Lynn Stars
- 2011: Ipswich Witches
- 2012, 2014, 2019: Peterborough Panthers
- 2012–2014, 2017: Leicester Lions
- 2012: Swindon Robins
- 2014: Wolverhampton Wolves
- 2015–2016: Redcar Bears
- 2017–2018: Sheffield Tigers
- 2019: Newcastle Diamonds

Poland
- 2010-2011: Wrocław
- 2013: Piła

Individual honours
- 2011: Danish Under-21 Champion

Team honours
- 2010: Team U-21 World Champion
- 2017: SGB Championship
- 2017: SGB Championship Pairs
- 2011: Premier League Fours Champion

Lasse Bjerre Jensen (born 31 October 1993) is a speedway rider who won the 2010 Under-21 World Cup with the Denmark team.

== Biography ==
Bjerre was born in Esbjerg, Denmark in 1993. His brother, Kenneth (born 1984), is also a speedway rider. They have two sisters, Janni and Lotte. Their parents are Ivan and Vibeke.

Bjerre was part of the Danish team that won the World under-21 Team Cup in 2010, and he won the Danish Under-21 Championship in 2011.

Bjerre rode for King's Lynn Stars in the latter part of the 2010 season, and became a Peterborough Panthers asset towards the end of that year. He rode again for King's Lynn in 2011, doubling up with Ipswich Witches. He was part of the Ipswich team that won the Premier League Four-Team Championship, held on 23 October 2011, at Beaumont Park Stadium.

Bjerre signed to ride for Peterborough Panthers in the Elite League in 2012 in a doubling-up role, and also in the Premier League with Leicester Lions. In June 2012 he was dropped by Panthers but in August 2012, joined Swindon Robins.

In 2017, Bjerre won the SGB Championship Pairs partnering Kyle Howarth for Sheffield Tigers during the SGB Championship 2017 season. He signed again for Sheffield in 2018 before joining Newcastle in 2019.

== Major results ==
=== World Championships ===
- Individual U-21 World Championship
  - 2010 - lost in the Qualifying Round Five
- Team U-21 World Championship
  - 2010 - (England) Rye House - Under-21 World Champion (5 pts)

=== European Championships ===
- Individual U-19 European Championship
  - 2010 - lost in the Semi-Final Three
- Team U-19 European Championship
  - 2010 - lost in the Semi-Final One
