= Emil Grøndal =

Danish speedway rider

- Born: 27 May 1995 (age 31); Silkeborg, Denmark
- Nationality: Danish

Career history

Denmark
- 2012–2014, 2018: Holstebro
- 2014–2017, 2019: Grindsted
- 2016: Munkebo

Great Britain
- 2015-2016, 2018: Peterborough
- 2017: Swindon

Team honours
- 2012, 2013, 2015: Team Speedway Junior European Championship 2 silver & 1 bronze

Emil Grøndal (born 27 May 1995) is a former speedway rider from Denmark. He medalled three times at the Team Speedway Junior European Championship.

== Career ==
Grøndal reached the final of the 2015 Speedway Under-21 World Championship. He also began his British speedway career riding for Peterborough Panthers in 2015. In 2016, he remained with Peterborough for the 2016 Premier League speedway season.

Grøndal rode in the top tier of British Speedway riding for the Swindon Robins in the SGB Premiership 2017 before returning to Peterborough for the SGB Championship 2018.

Grøndal announced his retirement from speedway in November 2020.
