= Mikkel Bech =

Danish speedway rider

- Born: 31 August 1994 (age 32); Næstved, Denmark
- Nationality: Danish

Career history

Denmark
- 2010–2011: Vojens
- 2012–2016: Esbjerg
- 2017–2019: Region Varde

Poland
- 2012: Rybnik
- 2013–2014: Zielona Góra
- 2015: Gniezno
- 2017–2020: Gdańsk

Sweden
- 2011–2012: Gnistorna
- 2013, 2016: Vetlanda
- 2014: Dackarna
- 2015: Indianerna
- 2017–2020: Västervik

Great Britain
- 2011: Swindon
- 2013: Plymouth
- 2014–2015: Lakeside
- 2016: Wolverhampton

Individual honours
- 2014: Danish Junior Champion

Team honours
- 2013: Under-21 World Cup

Mikkel Bech Jensen (born 31 August 1994), often referred to simply as Mikkel Bech, is a former motorcycle speedway rider from Denmark.

== Career ==
Born in Næstved and raised in Glumsø, Bech took up speedway at the age of four, and began his senior career with Esbjerg. He made his debut in British speedway in 2011, riding for Swindon Robins towards the end of the season, but turned down the chance to return in 2012 in order to complete his education. He returned to Britain in 2013, joining Premier League team Plymouth Devils midway through the year and ending the season as the team's number one rider. He moved up to the Elite League in 2014 with Lakeside Hammers.

Bech finished third in the 2012 Under-21 World Championship, and was part of the Danish team that won the Under-21 World Cup in 2013.

Bech won the Danish Junior Championship in 2014.

Bech signed to ride for Esbjerg, Start Gniezno, and Lakeside Hammers in 2015.

Bech has competed in three Speedway Grand Prix and has represented Denmark in the Speedway World Cup.
