= Mikkel B. Andersen =

Danish speedway rider

Mikkel Brøndum Andersen
- Born: 31 July 1996 (age 30); Fjerritslev, Denmark
- Nationality: Danish

Career history

Denmark
- 2013–2015: Holstebro
- 2016–2018: Region Varde
- 2019: Grindsted
- 2021: Nordjysk

Great Britain
- 2018: Redcar Bears
- 2019: Glasgow Tigers

Poland
- 2018: Krosno

Mikkel Brøndum Andersen (born 31 July 1996, Fjerritslev, Denmark) is a motorcycle speedway rider from Denmark. He is not to be confused with another Danish speedway rider Mikkel Andersen (son of Brian Andersen).

== Career ==
In 2016, Andersen won the Nordic U-21 Speedway Championship. The following season in 2017, he was signed by Swindon Robins for the 2017 season, but a problem over the points limits for the team led to the signing falling through.

Andersen joined the Redcar Bears in 2018 after having previously raced at the South Tees Motorsports Park during the Tesside Silver Helmet in 2015. He moved to Glasgow Tigers in 2019.

== Family ==
Andersen's brother is fellow speedway rider Jonas Andersen.
