= Jonas Andersen (speedway rider) =

Danish speedway rider (born 1992)

Jonas Brøndum Andersen
- Born: 5 September 1992 (age 34); Strøm, Denmark
- Nationality: Danish

Career history

Denmark
- 2009–2010, 2021: Brovst/Nordjysk
- 2011–2014, 2017–2018: Holstebro
- 2015–2016: Region Varde
- 2019: Fjelsted

Great Britain
- 2015–2018: Redcar
- 2018: Wolverhampton

Poland
- 2018: Bydgoszcz

Jonas Brøndum Andersen (born 5 September 1992) is a motorcycle speedway rider from Denmark.

== Career ==
In December 2014, Andersen signed to ride for the Redcar Bears for the 2015 Premier League speedway season His signing was mid-season due to the Bears injury issues at the time and Andersen made an instant impact. During 2017, he re-signed for Redcar and recorded a 7.16 average.

Andersen rode for Redcar for four seasons in total until the end of the 2018 season.

In August 2018, Andersen was signed as a replacement for Cameron Heeps and rode seven times for Wolverhampton Wolves in the SGB Premiership 2018. During 2018, he also appeared for Polonia Bydgoszcz in the 2018 Polish speedway season.

== Family ==
Andersen's brother is fellow speedway rider Mikkel B. Andersen.
