= Nikolaj Busk Jakobsen =

Danish speedway rider

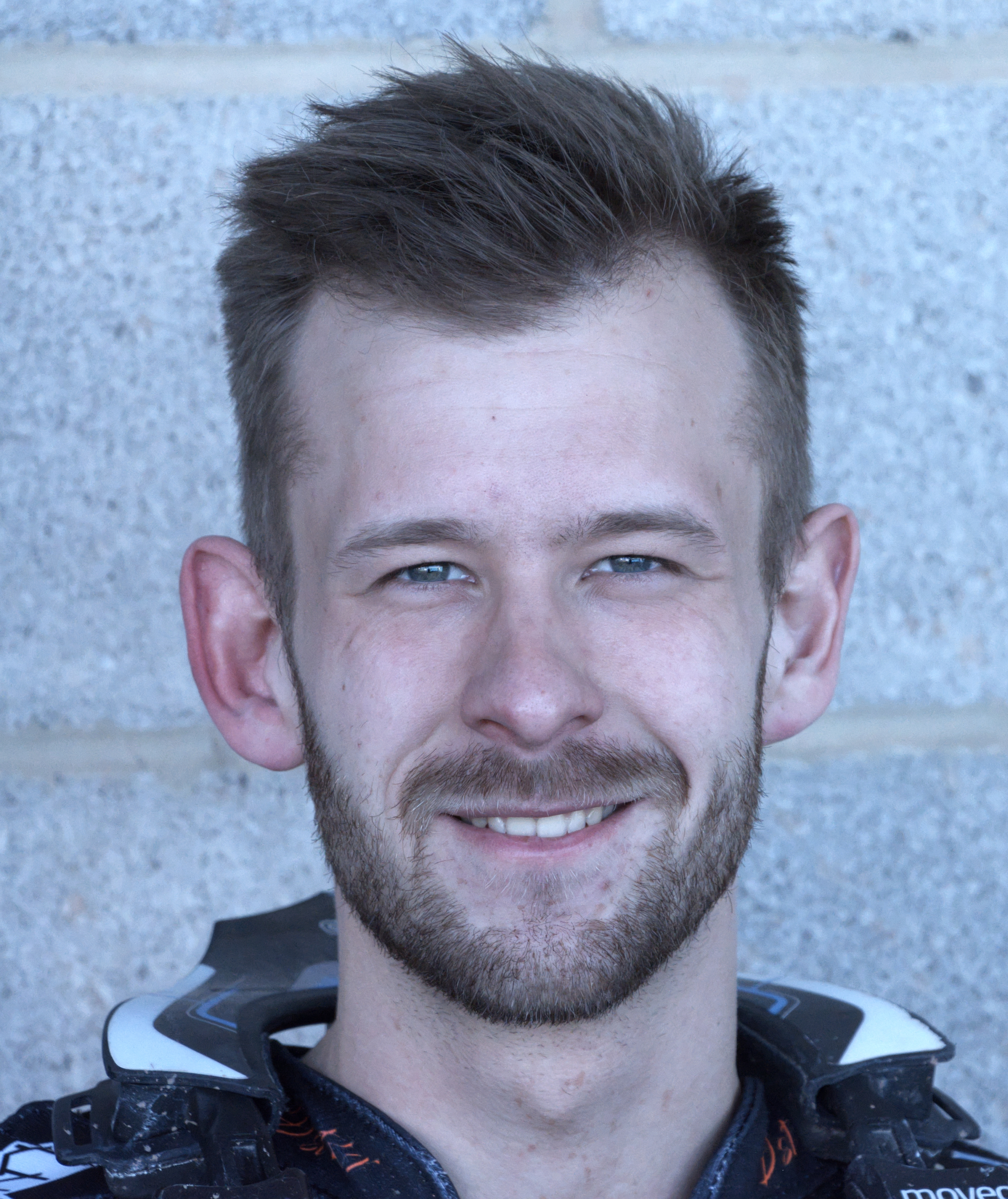
- Born: 14 February 1994 (age 32); Denmark
- Nationality: Danish

Career history

Denmark
- 2010–2013: Holstebro
- 2013–2017: Fjelsted
- 2018–2021: Grindsted

Great Britain
- 2015, 2018: Rye House Rockets
- 2016: Peterborough Panthers
- 2017-2019, 2021: Berwick Bandits
- 2019: Poole Pirates
- 2019, 2021: Belle Vue Aces

Sweden
- 2019: Dackarna

Nikolaj Busk Jakobsen (born 14 February 1994) is a Danish motorcycle speedway rider.

== Career ==
Jakobsen reached four consecutive finals of the Speedway Under-21 World Championship from 2012 to 2015.

In 2015, Jakobsen began his British league career after he signed for Rye House Rockets for the 2015 Premier League speedway season. The following season, he moved to Peterborough Panthers before riding for Berwick Bandits for two seasons.

Jakobsen rode in the top tier of British Speedway, riding for the Belle Vue Aces and Poole Pirates in the SGB Premiership 2019. In 2021, he returned to Berwick again to ride in the SGB Championship having been with the English team since 2018.
