= 2011 Individual Speedway Junior World Championship qualification =

British motorcycle speedway rider

The 2011 FIM Speedway Under 21 World Championship events took place from May to June 2010. The qualifying would determine the qualifiers for the 2011 Individual Speedway Junior World Championship finals.

In a new format approved by the International Motorcycling Federation (FIM), there were four final meetings with fourteen permanent riders and two wild cards and two track reserves. The permanent riders was determined in five Qualifying Round and two Semi-Finals.

== Qualification system ==
In five Qualifying Round was started 80 riders and to Semi-Finals was qualify top 6 from each meetings. This 30 riders and 2 riders from Semi-Final' host federations (Slovakia and Poland) was started in two Semi-Finals. The top 7 riders from both SF was automatically qualify for all Final meetings.

== Qualifying rounds ==
=== Qualifying Round One ===
- 17 April 2011
- (Germany) Waldstadion, Herxheim
- Referee: Wojciech Grodzki
- Jury President: Ila Teromaa
- References

Pos.	Rider	Points	Details
1	(United Kingdom) (7) Josh Auty	14+3	(3,3,2,3,3)
2	(Sweden) (9) Dennis Andersson	14+2	(3,3,3,3,2)
3	(Australia) (13) Richard Sweetman	13	(3,1,3,3,3)
4	(Australia) (1) Justin Sedgmen	11	(3,2,1,2,3)
5	(United Kingdom) (12) Jerran Hart	10	(2,3,2,1,2)
6	(Slovenia) (16) Nejc Malesic	9+3	(2,2,2,2,1)
7	(United Kingdom) (4) Kyle Newman	9+2	(2,1,1,2,3)
8	(United Kingdom) (6) Joe Haines	8	(1,2,3,1,1)
9	(Germany) (15) Kai Huckenbeck	7	(X,2,3,0,2)
10	(Ukraine) (5) Andriy Kobrin	7	(2,0,X,3,2)
11	(Ukraine) (14) Volodymyr Teygel	6	(1,3,1,0,1)
12	(Denmark) (8) Lasse Bjerre	5	(0,0,2,2,1)
13	(Germany) (10) Michel Hofmann	3	(1,1,0,1,0)
14	(Germany) (2) Marco Gaschka	3	(1,R,1,1,0)
15	(Slovenia) (3) Matic Ivačič	1	(Fx,1,0,0,0)
16	(Hungary) (11) Patrik Nagy	0	(0,0,0,0,0)
—	(Germany) (17) Andre Mochner	—	—
—	(Germany) (18) Friedrich Ruf	—	—

=== Qualifying Round Two ===
- 15 May 2011
- (Germany) Anton-Treffer-Stadion, Neustadt an der Donau
- Referee: Craig Ackroyd
- Jury President: Andrzej Grodzki
- References

Pos.	Rider	Points	Details
1	(Poland) (11) Patryk Dudek	14+3	(3,2,3,3,3)
2	(Russia) (7) Andrey Kudryashov	14+2	(3,3,3,3,2)
3	(Australia) (12) Josh Grajczonek	12	(1,3,3,2,3)
4	(Poland) (9) Maciej Janowski	11	(2,X,3,3,3)
5	(Latvia) (5) Jevgēņijs Karavackis	10	(R,3,2,3,2)
6	(Czech Republic) (14) Jan Holub III	9	(3,3,1,1,1)
7	(Austria) (4) Lukas Simon	7+2+3+3	(2,2,2,1,0)
8	(Germany) (2) Marcel Helfer	7+3+2	(3,0,1,2,1)
9	(United States) (16) Mike Buman	7+1+2+1	(2,1,2,2,0)
10	(Denmark) (6) Nicklas Porsing	7+3+R	(2,1,R,2,2)
11	(United States) (1) Bryce Starks	7+F+X	(1,2,1,R,3)
12	(Czech Republic) (3) Michal Dudek		(R,1,2,F,1)
13	(Germany) (8) Dany Maaßen	4	(1,R,X,1,2)
14	(France) (13) Xavier Muratet	3	(1,1,1,0,0)
15	(Russia) (10) Vladimir Borodulin	2	(X,2,R,-,-)
16	(Germany) (15) Nils Hesse	1	(0,0,0,0,1)
17	(Germany) (17) Steven Mauer	1	(1)
18	(Germany) (18) Valentin Grobauer	0	(0)

=== Qualifying Round Three ===
- 15 May 2011
- (Ukraine) Mototrek Hirnyk, Chervonohrad
- Referee: Michael Bates
- Jury President: Milan Špinka
- References

Pos.	Rider	Points	Details
1	(Poland) (2) Piotr Pawlicki, Jr.	13+3	(3,2,3,3,2)
2	(Russia) (10) Vadim Tarasenko	13+2	(3,3,2,3,2)
3	(Latvia) (1) Andrzej Lebiediew	12	(2,3,3,1,3)
4	(Poland) (9) Bartosz Zmarzlik	11	(2,X,3,3,3)
5	(Russia) (7) Vitaliy Belousov	11	(3,2,3,2,1)
6	(Ukraine) (3) Aleksandr Loktaev	10+3	(3,1,1,3,2)
7	(Poland) (11) Szymon Woźniak	10+2	(1,3,1,2,3)
8	(Ukraine) (8) Kirił Cukanow	9	(1,1,2,2,3)
9	(Poland) (6) Dawid Lampart	8	(2,0,2,2,2)
10	(Russia) (5) Denis Nosow	6	(1,2,2,1,0)
11	(Russia) (12) Iwan Łysik	4	(0,3,1,0,0)
12	(Czech Republic) (4) Václav Milík, Jr.	4	(0,2,0,1,1)
13	(United Kingdom) (13) Steve Worrall	4	(F,1,1,1,1)
14	(Czech Republic) (15) Pavol Pucko	2	(2,T/-,0,0,0)
15	(Ukraine) (14) Stanisław Ogorodnik	2	(0,1,0,0,1)
16	(Latvia) (16) Iwan Pleszakow	1	(1,0,0,0,0)
17	(Ukraine) (17) Witalij Łysak	0	(0)
—	(Ukraine) (18) Pawlo Kondratiuk	—	—

=== Qualifying Round Four ===
- 21 May 2011
- (Sweden) Malmö Motorstadion, Malmö
- Referee: Jim Lawrence
- Jury President: Milan Špinka
- References

Pos.	Rider	Points	Details
1	(Sweden) (14) Simon Gustafsson	15	(3,3,3,3,3)
2	(Sweden) (6) Linus Sundström	13	(3,2,2,3,3)
3	(Denmark) (15) Michael Jepsen Jensen	12	(2,2,3,2,3)
4	(Denmark) (10) Mikkel Bech Jensen	10	(3,1,2,2,2)
5	(Sweden) (11) Kim Nilsson	10	(1,3,1,3,2)
6	(Sweden) (4) Ludvig Lindgren	9+3	(2,2,3,1,1)
7	(Finland) (16) Kalle Katajisto	9+2	(1,3,3,1,1)
8	(Denmark) (5) Jonas Andersen	6	(0,3,R,3,R)
9	(Sweden) (9) Anders Mellgren	6	(0,1,2,0,3)
10	(Finland) (2) Jari Mäkinen	6	(1,R,2,1,2)
11	(Denmark) (12) Michael Palm Toft	5	(2,F,1,2,-)
12	(Denmark) (1) Mikkel Michelsen	4	(3,0,0,0,1)
13	(Finland) (13) Timo Lahti	4	(0,2,0,2,0)
14	(Finland) (7) Niko Siltaniemi	4	(2,0,1,1,0)
15	(Sweden) (3) Victor Palovaara	3	(0,1,1,0,1)
16	(Sweden) (17) Jacob Thorssell	2	(2)
17	(Denmark) (8) Kenni Nissen	2	(1,1,0,0,0)
—	(Sweden) (18) Tim Gudmundsson	—	—

=== Qualifying Round Five ===
- 21 May 2011
- (Croatia) Stadium Milenium, Goričan
- Referee: Jesper Steentoft
- Jury President: Petr Ondrašík
- References

Pos.	Rider	Points	Details
	(Poland) (8) Przemysław Pawlicki	14	(3,3,3,2,3)
	(Australia) (11) Darcy Ward	13	(3,2,3,3,2)
	(Poland) (14) Emil Pulczyński	12	(3,2,1,3,3)
	(Russia) (6) Ilya Chalov	11	(1,3,1,3,3)
	(Croatia) (1) Dino Kovačić	10	(3,3,2,1,2)
	(Czech Republic) (12) Michael Hádek	10	(2,2,2,2,2)
7	(Slovenia) (3) Aleksander Čonda	9	(R,3,2,3,1)
8	(Denmark) (13) Kasper Lykke Nielsen	8	(2,2,3,1,0)
9	(Croatia) (10) Jasmin Ilijaš	7	(1,1,2,2,1)
10	(Australia) (5) Taylor Poole	6	(2,0,3,0,1)
11	(France) (16) David Bellego	6	(1,1,0,1,3)
12	(Czech Republic) (2) Roman Čejka	4	(2,0,0,0,2)
13	(Slovenia) (15) Ziga Radkovic	3	(0,X,1,2,0)
14	(Czech Republic) (4) Ondřej Veverka	3	(1,0,1,1,0)
15	(Italy) (7) Michele Paco Castagna	2	(0,1,0,0,1)
16	(Slovenia) (9) Ladislav Vida	1	(0,1,1,0,0)
—	(Croatia) (17) —	—	—
—	(Croatia) (18) —	—	—

== Semi-finals ==
=== Semi-Final One ===
- 4 June 2011
- (Slovakia) Speedwaystadium, Žarnovica
- Referee: Marek Wojaczek
- Jury President: Armando Castagna
- References

Pos.	Rider	Points	Details
1	(Denmark) (16) Michael Jepsen Jensen	13+3	(3,3,3,3,1)
2	(Slovakia) (9) Martin Vaculík	13+2	(3,3,2,3,2)
3	(Sweden) (2) Dennis Andersson	12+3	(3,3,3,3,0)
4	(Australia) (12) Darcy Ward	12+2	(2,2,2,3,3)
5	(Poland) (7) Patryk Dudek	11	(3,3,R,2,3)
6	(Poland) (8) Bartosz Zmarzlik	11	(2,1,3,2,3)
7	(Russia) (14) Vadim Tarasenko	8+3	(1,2,1,1,3)
8	(Poland) (3) Emil Pulczyński	8+2	(2,2,0,2,2)
9	(Australia) (13) Richard Sweetman	8+1	(2,2,2,1,1)
10	(Russia) (4) Vitaly Belousov	6	(1,0,3,2,0)
11	(Sweden) (5) Kim Nilsson	6	(1,1,1,1,2)
12	(Latvia) (11) Jevgēņijs Karavackis	4	(0,1,2,0,1)
13	(Czech Republic) (6) Jan Holub III	3	(0,1,1,1,0)
14	(Austria) (18) Lukas Simon	2	(0,R,0,2)
15	(United Kingdom) (10) Josh Auty	1	(1,X,X,-,-)
16	(Czech Republic) (1) Michael Hádek	0	(0,0,0,R,-)
17	(United Kingdom) (15) Jerran Hart	0	(0,0,-,-,-)
—	(Finland) (17) Kalle Katajisto	—	—

=== Semi-Final Two ===
- 25 June 2011
- (Poland) Start Gniezno Stadium, Gniezno
- Referee: Pavel Vana
- Jury President: Christer Bergstrom
- References
- Change:

Draw 16. (Australia) Josh Grajczonek → Reserve 17.
Draw 13. (Poland) Kacper Gomolski → Oskar Fajfer

Pos.	Rider	Points	Details
1	(Ukraine) (12) Aleksandr Loktaev	14	(3,3,2,3,3)
2	(Poland) (10) Przemysław Pawlicki	13	(2,2,3,3,3)
3	(Sweden) (2) Simon Gustafsson	12	(2,1,3,3,3)
4	(Poland) (7) Piotr Pawlicki, Jr.	11	(2,3,2,2,2)
5	(Poland) (14) Maciej Janowski	9	(2,0,3,1,3)
6	(Croatia) (9) Dino Kovačić	9	(1,3,2,3,Fx)
7	(Poland) (13) Oskar Fajfer	9	(3,1,1,2,2)
8	(Sweden) (11) Linus Sundström	8	(0,2,3,1,2)
9	(Denmark) (6) Mikkel Bech Jensen	8	(1,3,1,2,1)
10	(Sweden) (8) Ludvig Lindgren	7	(3,2,0,0,2)
11	(Australia) (3) Justin Sedgmen	6	(3,1,1,1,0)
12	(Poland) (16) Szymon Woźniak	5	(1,1,0,2,1)
13	(Russia) (5) Andrey Kudryashov	4	(0,2,1,0,1)
14	(Russia) (1) Ilya Chalov	4	(1,0,2,Fx,1)
15	(Latvia) (4) Andžejs Ļebedevs	1	(0,Fx,M/-,1,0)
16	(Slovenia) (15) Nejc Malesic	0	(0,0,0,0,0)
17	(Germany) (18) Marcel Helfer	0	(0)
	(United Kingdom) (17) Kyle Newman		

== See also ==
- 2012 Speedway Grand Prix Qualification
- 2011 Team Speedway Junior World Championship
