= 2010 Individual Speedway Junior World Championship qualification =

European motorcycle speedway event

This page describes the qualifying procedure for the 2010 Individual Speedway Junior World Championship finals.

The 2010 FIM Speedway Under 21 World Championship events took place from April to June 2010. In a new format approved by the International Motorcycling Federation (FIM), there were three final meetings with fourteen permanent riders and two wild cards and two track reserves. The permanent riders was determined in five Qualifying Round and two Semi-Finals.

== Qualification system ==
In five Qualifying Round was started 80 riders and to Semi-Finals was qualify top 6 from each meetings. This 30 riders and 2 riders from Semi-Final' host federations (Matija Duh of Slovenia and Kevin Wölbert of Germany) was started in two Semi-Finals. The top 7 riders from both SF was automatically qualify for all Final meetings.

== Qualifying rounds ==
=== Qualifying Round One ===
- 25 April 2010
- (Germany) Anton Treffer Stadion, Neustadt an der Donau
- Referee: Jesper Steentoft
- Jury President: Anthony Noel
- References
- Changes:

Draw 6: (Czech Republic) Václav Milík, Jr. → Jan Holub
Draw 11: (Germany) Max Dilger → René Deddens
Draw 3: (New Zealand) Hugh Skidmore → (Germany) Michel Hofmann
Draw 17: (Germany) Michel Hofmann → Dennis Helfer
Draw 18: (Germany) Dennis Helfer → Nils Hesse
Draw 9: (Hungary) Attila Lorincz → (Czech Republic) Roman Čejka
Draw 8: (Austria) Daniel Gappmaier was replaced by Reserve 17

Pos.	Rider	Points	Details
1	(Slovakia) (7) Martin Vaculík	15	(3,3,3,3,3)
2	(Poland) (13) Przemysław Pawlicki	14	(3,3,2,3,3)
3	(Germany) (4) Frank Facher	12	(3,3,0,3,3)
4	(Latvia) (10) Vjačeslavs Giruckis	11	(3,3,1,3,1)
5	(Ukraine) (1) Kiril Tcukanov	10	(2,1,3,1,3)
6	(Poland) (5) Sławomir Musielak	9+3	(2,2,1,2,2)
7	(Czech Republic) (6) Jan Holub III	9+X	(1,2,2,2,2)
8	(Latvia) (15) Jevgēņijs Karavackis	7	(2,T/-,3,R,2)
9	(Czech Republic) (12) Michael Hádek	7	(2,2,0,2,1)
10	(Hungary) (2) József Tabaka	6	(1,X,2,1,2)
11	(Czech Republic) (9) Roman Čejka	5	(1,0,3,R,1)
12	(Germany) (11) René Deddens	5	(0,2,1,2,0)
13	(New Zealand) (14) Dale Finch	4	(0,1,2,0,1)
14	(Germany) (16) Kai Huckenbeck	3	(1,1,0,1,X)
15	(Germany) (17) Dennis Helfer	1	(0,0,1,0,0)
16	(Germany) (3) Michel Hofmann	1	(0,1,0,0,0)
17	(Germany) (18) Nils Hesse	0	(0)

=== Qualifying Round Two ===
- 8 May 2010
- (Slovenia) Petišovci Stadium, Lendava
- Referee: Andrzej Savin
- Jury President: Jørgen L. Jensen
- References
- Change:

Draw 5. (Italy) → (Ukraine)
Draw 14. Patrick Noergaard → Thomas Jørgensen
Draw 7. (United Kingdom) Josh Auty → Reserve 17

Pos.	Rider	Points	Details
1	(Latvia) (13) Maksims Bogdanovs	12+3	(3,3,3,3,R)
2	(Poland) (6) Sławomir Pyszny	12+R	(2,3,3,2,2)
3	(Poland) (4) Patryk Dudek	11+3	(3,3,2,3,0)
4	(Germany) (8) Max Dilger	11+2	(3,2,2,1,3)
5	(Ukraine) (5) Aleksandr Loktaev	10	(X,1,3,3,3)
6	(Poland) (11) Szymon Kiełbasa	10	(3,3,2,0,2)
7	(Denmark) (10) Simon Nielsen	9	(2,2,1,2,2)
8	(Slovenia) (3) Aljoša Remih	8	(2,2,0,1,3)
9	(United Kingdom) (2) Jerran Hart	8	(0,1,2,2,3)
10	(Denmark) (14) Thomas Jørgensen	8	(2,R,3,2,1)
11	(Slovenia) (9) Samo Kukovica	7	(1,2,1,1,2)
12	(Germany) (1) Marcel Helfer	6	(1,0,1,3,1)
13	(Austria) (12) Johannes Fiala	3	(0,1,1,1,R)
14	(Slovenia) (17) Žiga Radkovič	2	(1,1,0,0,0)
15	(Slovenia) (16) Ladislav Vida	1	(0,0,0,0,1)
16	(Germany) (15) Danny Maassen	1	(1,T/-,0,0,0)
17	(Slovenia) (18) Jernej Pečnik	0	(R)

=== Qualifying Round Three ===
- 15 May 2010
- (Poland) Zbigniew Podlecki Stadium, Gdańsk
- Referee: Thierry Bouin
- Jury President: Boris Kotnjek
- References
- Changes:

Draw 17. Kamil Fleger → Marcel Szymko
Draw 18. Marcel Szymko → Szymon Woźniak → Emil Pulczyński

Pos.	Rider	Points	Details
1	(Poland) (1) Artur Mroczka	14	(3,3,3,2,3)
2	(Russia) (6) Artem Laguta	13	(3,2,2,3,3)
3	(Russia) (14) Vadim Tarasenko	12	(3,3,1,3,2)
4	(United Kingdom) (9) Joe Haines	11	(1,2,3,2,3)
5	(Finland) (12) Kalle Katajisto	10	(3,1,3,1,2)
6	(Sweden) (2) Anton Rosén	9+3	(2,1,2,2,2)
7	(Germany) (8) Eric Pudel	9+2	(1,3,2,3,X)
8	(Poland) (3) Adrian Szewczykowski	8	(1,3,0,3,1)
9	(Australia) (4) Sam Masters	7	(0,2,2,0,3)
10	(Poland) (17) Marcel Szymko	6	(2,0,1,2,1)
11	(United Kingdom) (15) Kyle Hughes	5	(2,0,0,1,2)
12	(Poland) (13) Damian Sperz	4	(0,1,3,X,R)
13	(Australia) (10) Tyson Nelson	4	(2,F,1,F,1)
14	(Ukraine) (11) Serhiy Borisenko	3	(F,2,1,F,0)
15	(Czech Republic) (16) Václav Milík, Jr.	3	(1,0,0,1,1)
16	(Czech Republic) (7) Michal Dudek	1	(0,1,0,0,0)
—	(Ukraine) (5) Andriy Kobrin	—	(-,-,-,-,-)
—	(Poland) (18) Emil Pulczyński	—	—

=== Qualifying Round Four ===
- 16 May 2010
- (Croatia) Stadium Milenium, Goričan
- Referee: Jim Lawrence
- Jury President: Armando Castagna
- References
- Change:

Draw 13: (Russia) → (Poland)
Draw 16: (United Kingdom) Lewis Bridger → Kyle Newman
Draw 9: (United States) Brad Pappalardo → Reserve 17

Pos.	Rider	Points	Details
1	(Croatia) (2) Jurica Pavlic	12	(3,3,3,3)
2	(Australia) (3) Darcy Ward	11	(2,3,3,3)
3	(Poland) (12) Maciej Janowski	9	(3,3,X,3)
4	(Czech Republic) (1) Matěj Kůs	9	(1,3,3,2)
5	(Australia) (15) Justin Sedgmen	8	(3,2,1,2)
6	(Russia) (5) Andrey Kudryashov	7+3	(3,2,2,Z)
7	(United Kingdom) (16) Kyle Newman	7+2	(2,2,1,2)
8	(Poland) (6) Dawid Lampart	7+X	(2,2,X,3)
9	(Slovenia) (8) Aleksander Čonda	6	(1,1,2,2)
10	(Croatia) (11) Dino Kovačić	6	(2,1,2,1)
11	(Poland) (13) Kamil Fleger	5	(1,1,3,0)
12	(Croatia) (4) Renato Cvetko	3	(0,0,2,1)
13	(United States) (7) Gino Manzares	2	(0,0,1,1)
14	(Czech Republic) (14) Pavol Pučko	2	(0,1,1,0)
15	(Slovenia) (10) Nejc Malesic	1	(F,F,0,1)
16	(Croatia) (17) Matic Ivačič	1	(1,R,R,N)

=== Scandinavian Qualifying Round Five ===
- 15 May 2010
- (Denmark) Holsted Speedway Center, Holsted
- Referee: Mick Brates
- Jury President: Andrzej Grodzki
- References
- Change:
  - Draw 2. (Norway) → (Denmark)

Pos.	Rider	Points	Details
1	(Sweden) (11) Dennis Andersson	13	(2,3,3,3,2)
2	(Denmark) (14) Patrick Hougaard	12	(2,3,2,2,3)
3	(Sweden) (13) Linus Sundström	11	(1,3,3,2,2)
4	(Sweden) (8) Kim Nilsson	10	(3,F,3,1,3)
5	(Denmark) (9) René Bach	10	(3,0,1,3,3)
6	(Sweden) (15) Simon Gustafsson	9+3	(3,1,2,2,1)
7	(Denmark) (12) Lasse Bjerre	9+2	(1,3,3,1,1)
8	(Sweden) (3) Christian Agö	8	(0,2,0,3,3)
9	(Finland) (10) Timo Lahti	8	(0,2,2,2,2)
10	(Denmark) (1) Peter Kildemand	7	(3,2,2,0,0)
11	(Denmark) (7) Michael Jepsen Jensen	7	(1,0,1,3,2)
12	(Finland) (4) Jari Mäkinen	6	(2,2,X,1,1)
13	(Sweden) (5) Ludvig Lindgren	4	(2,1,1,0,0)
14	(Denmark) (2) Patrick Bjerregaard	3	(1,1,0,0,1)
15	(Denmark) (16) Jonas B. Andersen	3	(0,1,1,1,0)
16	(Finland) (6) Niko Siltaniemi	0	(0,0,0,0,0)
—	(Denmark) (17) Nicki Barrett	—	—
—	(Denmark) (18) Nicklas Porsing	—	—

== Semi-finals ==
=== Semi-Final One ===
- 26 June 2010
- (Slovenia) Matija Gubec Stadium, Krško
- Referee: Jesper Stentoft
- Jury President: Ilkka Teromaa
- References
- Change:

Draw 7. injured (Ukraine) Aleksandr Loktaev → Reserve 17

Pos.	Rider	Points	Details
1	(Latvia) (3) Maksims Bogdanovs	15	(3,3,3,3,3)
2	(Denmark) (16) Patrick Hougaard	13+3	(2,3,3,2,3)
3	(Russia) (14) Vadim Tarasenko	13+2	(3,3,2,2,3)
4	(Poland) (13) Patryk Dudek	11	(1,3,2,3,2)
5	(Russia) (1) Artem Laguta	10	(1,1,2,3,3)
6	(Czech Republic) (10) Matěj Kůs	10	(3,1,3,1,2)
7	(Croatia) (9) Jurica Pavlic	9	(2,2,Fx,3,2)
8	(Sweden) (5) Simon Gustafsson	8	(3,0,3,0,1)
9	(Australia) (15) Justin Sedgmen	6	(0,2,2,1,1)
10	(Poland) (4) Sławomir Musielak	5	(2,2,1,0,0)
11	(Poland) (2) Przemysław Pawlicki	5	(0,2,1,2,X)
12	(Sweden) (11) Kim Nilsson	5	(1,1,0,1,2)
13	(Finland) (8) Kalle Katajisto	4	(2,1,1,0,0)
14	(Germany) (6) Max Dilger	4	(0,0,1,2,1)
15	(Denmark) (17) Simon Nielsen	3	(1,0,0,1,1)
16	(Slovenia) (12) Matija Duh	0	(0,0,0,R,0)
—	(Czech Republic) (18) Jan Holub III	—	—

=== Semi-Final Two ===
- 26 June 2010
- (Germany) Ellermühle Speedway Stadium, Landshut
- Referee: Craig Ackroyd
- Jury President: Jörgen Jensen
- References
- Change:

Draw 15. (Sweden) Linus Sundström → Reserve 17

Pos.	Rider	Points	Details
1	(Sweden) (5) Dennis Andersson	14	(3,3,2,3,3)
2	(Slovakia) (4) Martin Vaculík	12	(2,2,3,3,2)
3	(Poland) (12) Maciej Janowski	11+3	(3,1,3,1,3)
4	(Germany) (6) Frank Facher	11+2	(1,3,3,2,2)
5	(Germany) (14) Kevin Wölbert	10	(3,2,3,2,0)
6	(Denmark) (16) René Bach	10	(2,3,1,2,2)
7	(Australia) (11) Darcy Ward	9	(2,3,2,1,1)
8	(Poland) (2) Artur Mroczka	8	(3,1,1,3,0)
9	(Sweden) (9) Anton Rosén	8	(1,1,2,1,3)
10	(Latvia) (7) Vjačeslavs Giruckis	7	(2,0,1,3,1)
11	(United Kingdom) (1) Joe Haines	6	(1,2,0,0,3)
12	(Russia) (13) Andrey Kudryashov	5	(0,R,2,2,1)
13	(Germany) (17) Eric Pudel	3	(1,2,0,0,0)
14	(Poland) (3) Szymon Kiełbasa	3	(0,1,1,1,0)
15	(Ukraine) (8) Kiril Tcukanov	2	(R,0,0,0,2)
16	(Poland) (10) Sławomir Pyszny	1	(0,0,0,0,1)
—	(United Kingdom) (18) Kyle Newman	—	—

== See also ==
- 2011 Speedway Grand Prix Qualification
- 2010 Team Speedway Junior World Championship
