= 2009 Speedway Under-21 World Championship =

European motorcycle speedway event

World Under-21 Championship
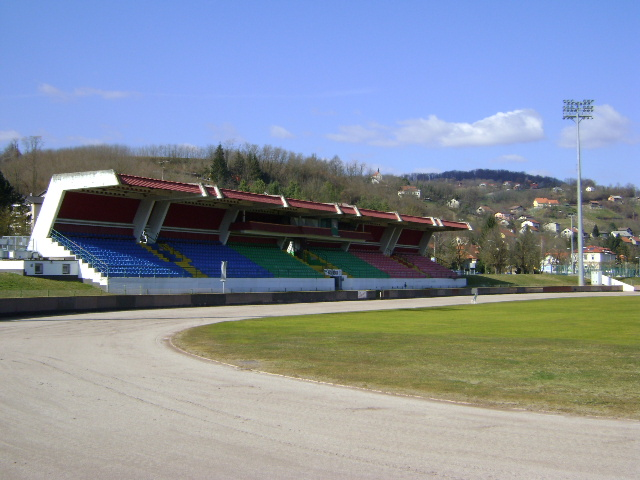
- The final was held at the Matija Gubec Stadium
- End date: 3 October 2009

The 2009 Individual Speedway Junior World Championship was the 33rd edition of the FIM World motorcycle speedway Under-21 Championships.

The final took place on 4 October 2009, at the Matija Gubec Stadium, in Goričan, Croatia. It was first final to be held in the Balkans and the Championship was won by Australian rider Darcy Ward.

== Calendar ==
Date	Venue	Winner	
Domestic Qualifications
21 April	(Poland) Gorzów Wlkp.	(Poland) Michał Mitko	result
Qualifying Rounds
26 April	(Germany) Neustadt/Donau	(Slovakia) Martin Vaculík	result
16 May	(Slovenia) Krško	(Croatia) Jurica Pavlic	result
17 May	(England) Hoddesdon	(United Kingdom) Robert Mear	result
16 May	(Czech Republic) Mšeno	(Germany) Kevin Wölbert	result
24 May	(Norway) Elgane	(Sweden) Thomas H. Jonasson	result
Semi-Finals
20 June	(Hungary) Miskolc	(United Kingdom) Tai Woffinden	result
27 June	(Sweden) Kumla	(Sweden) Thomas H. Jonasson	result
Final
3 October	(Croatia) Goričan	(Australia) Darcy Ward	result

== Domestic Qualifications ==
=== Finland ===
- 18 April 2009
- (Sweden) Hallstavik Speedway Stadium, Hallstavik

Pos.	Rider	Points	Details
1	Appe Mustonen	13	(3,3,2,2,3)
2	Tomi Reima	13	(1,3,3,3,3)
3	Kalle Katajisto	12	(3,3,3,u,3)
4	Niko Siltaniemi	11	(3,3,1,3,1)
5	Teemu Lahti	10+3	(2,1,3,2,2)
6	Timo Lahti	10+2	(3,2,0,3,2)
7	(Sweden) Peter Wall	10	(1,1,2,3,3)
8	(Sweden) Robin Burestad	8	(2,2,X,2,X)
9	(Sweden) Niklas Larsson	6	(0,1,2,2,1)
10	Jari Makinen	6	(2,2,1,1,X)
11	(Sweden) David Hillborg	6	(1,1,1,1,2)
12	Joni Keskinen	5	(0,2,3,X,0)
13	(Sweden) Jens Oscarsson	4	(0,X,2,0,2)
14	Aarni Heikkila	4	(2,0,0,1,1)
15	Joni Kitala	4	(1,0,1,1,1)
16	Jarkko Palmi	0	(X,0,0,X,X)

Top two riders from Domestic Final:

- Appe Mustonen
- Kalle Katajisto

Last one rider was nominated:

- Niko Siltaniemi (third in the Final)

Reserves:

- Teemu Lahti
- Timo Lahti
- Jari Makinen

=== Poland ===
32 riders to Domestic Semi-Finals was nominated by Main Commission of Speedway Sport. Semi-Finals took place on 17 April in Poznań and Rzeszów. The top eight riders from each Domestic Semi-Finals will qualify for the Domestic Final.

- Domestic Semi-Final 1
- 17 April 2009 (16:30)
- (Poland) Golęcin Speedway Stadium, Poznań
- Referee: Józef Piekarski
- Attendance: 1,000

Pos.	Rider	Points	Details
1	(2) Sławomir Musielak, LES	14	(3,3,3,2,3)
2	(5) Adrian Szewczykowski, GOR	13	(3,3,2,2,3)
3	(10) Patryk Pawlaszczyk, OST	11	(3,Fx,3,3,2)
4	(14) Paweł Zmarzlik, GOR	11	(3,2,3,1,2)
5	(11) Adam Kajoch, POZ	10	(2,2,3,3,0)
6	(3) Mateusz Lampkowski, TOR	9	(2,3,2,0,2)
7	(6) Damian Sperz, GDA	9	(1,1,2,2,3)
8	(1) Przemysław Pawlicki, LES	8+3	(1,1,0,3,3)
9	(13) Maciej Piaszczyński, ŁÓD	8+2	(2,2,2,1,1)
10	(8) Mateusz Kowalczyk, KRO	6	(2,3,1,0,0)
11	(4) Kamil Pulczyński, TOR	5	(0,0,1,3,1)
12	(7) Bartosz Szymura, RYB	5	(E4,1,T,2,2)
13	(16) Łukasz Cyran, GOR	5	(1,1,1,1,1)
14	(12) Kacper Gomólski, GNI	4	(1,2,1,Fx,Fx)
15	(15) Janusz Baniak, ZIE	2	(F3,F4,0,1,1)
16	(9) Emil Idziorek, OST	0	(0,E4,-,-,-)

- Domestic Semi-Final 2
- 17 April 2009 (16:00)
- (Poland) Stal Rzeszów Municipal Stadium, Rzeszów
- Referee: Rafał Pokrzywa (Rzeszów)
- Attendance: 900

Pos.	Rider	Points	Details
1	(8) Rafał Fleger, RYB	12	(3,3,2,2,2)
2	(2) Patryk Dudek, ZIE	11	(1,3,3,3,1)
3	(1) Grzegorz Zengota, ZIE	10	(3,3,1,3,E/start)
4	(3) Sławomir Pyszny, RYB	10	(2,3,1,2,2)
5	(5) Dawid Lampart, RZE	9	(1,F1,2,3,3)
6	(16) Szymon Kiełbasa, TAR	9	(E1,2,3,1,3)
7	(12) Michał Mitko, RYB	9	(2,1,1,2,3)
8	(7) Grzegorz Stróżyk, POZ	9	(2,2,2,1,2)
9	(9) Damian Celmer, TOR	8	(3,2,3,Fx,Fx)
10	(13) Mateusz Łukaszewski, LES	7	(3,1,3,F2,0)
11	(10) Borys Miturski, CZE	7	(1,2,1,Fx,3)
12	(6) Mateusz Szostek, RZE	7	(0,1,2,3,1)
13	(15) Kamil Cieślar, CZE	5	(2,1,0,2,M)
14	(14) Marcin Piekarski, CZE	3	(1,0,0,E4,2)
15	(4) Kamil Fleger, RYB	2	(0,0,E4,1,1)
16	(17) Piotr Machnik, KRO	1	(E4,1,E)
17	(11) Marcel Kajzer, GNI	0	(E4,0,0,-,-)

Domestic Final

- 21 April 2009 (17:00)
- (Poland) Edward Jancarz Stadium, Gorzów Wielkopolski

Pos.	Rider	Points	Details
1	(15) Michał Mitko, RYB	14	(3,2,3,3,3)
2	(11) Grzegorz Zengota, ZIE	13	(3,3,3,3,1)
3	(16) Przemysław Pawlicki, LES	12	(2,3,2,2,3)
4	(8) Szymon Kiełbasa, TAR	10+3	(3,2,3,2,0)
5	(1) Paweł Zmarzlik, GOR	10+2	(1,3,1,3,2)
6	(10) Mateusz Lampkowski, TOR	10+1	(2,1,3,3,1)
7	(4) Adam Kajoch, POZ	9+3	(2,0,2,2,3)
8	(3) Patryk Pawlaszczyk, OST	9+2	(3,1,2,1,2)
9	(2) Sławomir Pyszny, RYB	8	(0,3,2,1,2)
10	(14) Sławomir Musielak, LES	8	(1,2,1,2,2)
11	(12) Adrian Szewczykowski, GOR	5	(1,1,1,1,1)
12	(6) Dawid Lampart, RZE	4	(M/-,0,F3,1,3)
13	(5) Rafał Fleger, RYB	4	(2,2,0,F4x,-)
14	(9) Patryk Dudek, ZIE	1	(0,0,0,0,1)
15	(13) Grzegorz Stróżyk, POZ	1	(0,1,F1x,M/-,-)
16	(17) Maciej Piaszczyński, ŁÓD	1	(1,0,E)
17	(18) Damian Celmer, TOR	0	(0,0,0)
18	(7) Damian Sperz, GDA	0	(0,0,Fx,-,-)

== Qualifying rounds ==
=== Neustadt/Donau ===
- Qualifying Round 1
- 26 April 2009 (14:00 CEST)
- (Germany) Anton-Treffer-Stadion, Neustadt an der Donau
- Referee: Jim Lawrence
- Jury President: Janos Nadasdi

Pos.	Rider	Points	Details
1	(Slovakia) (11) Martin Vaculík	14+3	(3,3,3,3,2)
2	(Poland) (4) Maciej Janowski	14+2	(2,3,3,3,3)
3	(Poland) (12) Grzegorz Zengota	13	(2,2,3,3,3)
4	(Latvia) (1) Maksims Bogdanovs	12	(3,3,1,2,3)
5	(Germany) (10) Max Dilger	10	(1,2,2,3,2)
6	(Latvia) (13) Vjačeslavs Giruckis	9	(3,1,1,2,2)
7	(United Kingdom) (6) Ben Barker	8	(3,3,2,F/-,-)
8	(Czech Republic) (16) Jan Holub III	7	(1,1,E,2,3)
9	(Germany) (14) Frank Facher	7	(2,1,2,1,1)
10	(Germany) (3) Manfred Betz	5	(1,2,1,1,0)
11	(Germany) (5) René Deddens	4	(2,0,2,X,0)
12	(Italy) (9) Mattia Tadiello	4	(0,2,F,1,1)
13	(Czech Republic) (8) Michael Hádek	3	(F,0,3,X,E)
14	(France) (7) Theo di Palma	3	(1,0,0,0,2)
15	(Germany) (18) Sebastian Eckerle	3	(2,1)
16	(Austria) (15) Lukas Simon	3	(0,1,1,0,1)
17	(France) (2) Gabriel Dubernard	0	(0,0,0,F,0)
-	(Germany) (17) Marcel Helfer	-	-

=== Krško ===
- Qualifying Round 2
- 16 May 2009 (19:15)
- (Slovenia) Matija Gubec Stadium, Krško
- Referee: Andrey Savin
- Jury President: Janos Nadasdi

Pos.	Rider	Points	Details
1	(Croatia) (5) Jurica Pavlic	15	(3,3,3,3,3)
2	(Poland) (10) Przemysław Pawlicki	13	(3,2,3,2,3)
3	(Poland) (8) Szymon Kiełbasa	12	(2,3,3,2,2)
4	(Germany) (4) Tobias Busch	11	(2,2,2,3,2)
5	(Poland) (7) Patryk Pawlaszczyk	10	(1,3,0,3,3)
6	(Slovenia) (2) Matic Voldrih	10	(3,3,2,X,2)
7	(Slovenia) (13) Aleksander Čonda	9	(1,1,1,3,3)
8	(Germany) (16) Eric Pudel	8	(2,1,3,1,1)
9	(Slovenia) (9) Matija Duh	7	(2,2,1,2,0)
10	(Ukraine) (14) Kiril Tcukanov	6	(3,1,2,X,0)
11	(Slovenia) (11) Aljosa Remih	6	(1,2,2,F,1)
12	(Croatia) (12) Nikola Pigac	4	(0,0,1,2,1)
13	(Ukraine) (3) Mihailo Oneshko	3	(1,0,0,0,2)
14	(United Kingdom) (15) Paul Starke	2	(0,1,0,e,1)
15	(Hungary) (6) Tamás Szilágyi	1	(0,0,0,1,0)
16	(United Kingdom) (1) Brendan Johnson	1	(0,0,1,F,-)
17	(Slovenia) (17) Samo Kukovica	0	(X)

=== Rye House ===
- Qualifying Round 3
- 17 May 2009 (14:15)
- (England) Rye House Stadium, Hoddesdon
- Referee: Krister Gardell
- Jury President: Boris Kotnjek

Pos.	Rider	Points	Details
1	(United Kingdom) (13) Robert Mear	13+3	(3,3,2,2,3)
2	(Australia) (3) Darcy Ward	13+2	(3,3,2,3,2)
3	(United Kingdom) (8) Tai Woffinden	12	(3,3,3,3,e2)
4	(United Kingdom) (4) Lewis Bridger	11	(1,1,3,3,3)
5	(Poland) (5) Artur Mroczka	10	(2,2,2,2,2)
6	(United States) (9) Ricky Wells	9+3	(3,1,1,2,2)
7	(Poland) (1) Paweł Zmarzlik	9+2	(2,Fx,1,3,3)
8	(Australia) (16) Kozza Smith	9+1	(2,2,2,F3,3)
9	(United Kingdom) (6) Lee Smart	7	(0,3,3,1,0)
10	(United Kingdom) (17) Jamie Courtney	7	(2,0,3,1,1)
11	(New Zealand) (14) Jade Mudgeway	6	(1,2,0,2,1)
12	(Poland) (7) Adam Kajoch	4	(1,2,0,0,1)
13	(Czech Republic) (10) Pavol Pucko	4	(1,0,1,1,1)
14	(New Zealand) (2) Grant Tregoning	3	(0,1,1,1,0)
15	(United States) (15) Tim Gomez	2	(0,0,0,0,2)
16	(Germany) (11) Kai Huckenbeck	1	(X,1,0,0,0)
17	(United Kingdom) (12) Joe Haines	-	(F/-,-,-,-,-)

=== Mšeno ===
- Qualifying Round 4
- 16 May 2009 (14:30)
- (Czech Republic) Mšeno Speedway Stadium, Mšeno
- Referee: Jim Lawrence
- Jury President: Armando Castagna

Pos.	Rider	Points	Details
1	(Germany) (13) Kevin Wölbert	14	(3,3,3,2,3)
2	(Russia) (16) Artem Laguta	13+3	(2,3,2,3,3)
3	(Denmark) (11) Nicolai Klindt	13+2	(3,3,3,1,3)
4	(Poland) (6) Michał Mitko	11	(3,3,1,3,1)
5	(Germany) (3) Sönke Petersen	11	(3,1,3,2,2)
6	(Czech Republic) (2) Matěj Kůs	11	(2,2,3,3,1)
7	(Australia) (15) Justin Sedgmen	8	(1,2,2,1,2)
8	(Czech Republic) (8) Filip Šitera	7	(2,2,E,0,3)
9	(Poland) (9) Mateusz Lampkowski	7	(1,2,2,F,2)
10	(Czech Republic) (14) Martin Gavenda	6	(0,1,1,3,1)
11	(Russia) (4) Vyacheslav Kazachuk	6	(1,1,0,2,2)
12	(United Kingdom) (10) Simon Lambert	5	(2,0,2,1,0)
13	(Denmark) (7) Nicki Barrett	4	(1,0,1,2,0)
14	(Croatia) (1) Renato Cvetko	2	(0,0,0,1,1)
15	(Czech Republic) (12) Michal Dudek	1	(0,0,1,0,0)
16	(Australia) (5) Aaron Summers	1	(0,1,e,e,0)

=== Elgane ===
- Scandinavian Qualifying Round 5
- 24 May 2009 (13:00)
- (Norway) Elgane, Varhaug
- Referee: Pavel Vana
- Jury President: Andrzej Grodzki

Pos.	Rider	Points	Details
1	(Sweden) (7) Thomas H. Jonasson	15	(3,3,3,3,3)
2	(Sweden) (13) Linus Eklöf	12	(3,3,2,1,3)
3	(Denmark) (14) Kenni Larsen	11+3	(0,3,3,2,3)
4	(Denmark) (3) Patrick Hougaard	11+e	(2,2,2,3,2)
5	(Sweden) (4) Ludvig Lindgren	10	(3,3,1,3,X)
6	(Denmark) (5) Peter Kildemand	10	(2,2,3,1,2)
7	(Sweden) (10) Kim Nilsson	9	(2,2,0,2,3)
8	(Sweden) (15) Anders Mellgren	8	(2,1,2,1,2)
9	(Denmark) (11) Leon Madsen	7	(3,0,2,2,X)
10	(Denmark) (16) Patrick Nørgaard	7	(1,1,3,0,2)
11	(Denmark) (8) René Bach	7	(1,2,1,3,Fx)
12	(Finland) (9) Kalle Katajisto	5	(1,1,0,2,1)
13	(Finland) (1) Niko Siltaniemi	2	(1,0,1,N,N)
14	(Norway) (2) Lars Daniel Gunnestad	2	(0,1,1,0,E)
15	(Norway) (17) Lars Filip	1	(0,T,T,0,1
16	(Finland) (12) Teemu Lahti	0	(0,0,X,X,N)
17	(Sweden) (6) Anton Rosén	0	(F/-,-,-,-,-)

== Semi-finals ==
=== Miskolc ===
- Semi-Final 1
- 20 June 2009 (16:30)
- (Hungary) Borsod Volán Stadion, Miskolc
- Referee: Pavel Vana
- Jury President: Andrzej Grodzki

Pos.	Rider	Points	Details
1	(United Kingdom) (9) Tai Woffinden	14	(3,2,3,3,3)
2	(Denmark) (1) Patrick Hougaard	13	(3,3,2,2,3)
3	(Russia) (14) Artem Laguta	11+3	(2,3,2,1,3)
4	(United Kingdom) (16) Lewis Bridger	11+2	(1,2,3,3,2)
5	(Australia) (5) Darcy Ward	11+1	(3,1,3,2,2)
6	(Croatia) (11) Jurica Pavlic	10	(2,3,1,3,1)
7	(Latvia) (12) Vjačeslavs Giruckis	9	(0,1,2,3,3)
8	(Poland) (13) Michał Mitko	7+3	(e,0,3,2,2)
9	(Sweden) (15) Linus Eklöf	7+2	(3,2,0,2,0)
10	(Hungary) (4) József Tabaka	6	(2,3,e,1,0)
11	(Czech Republic) (10) Matěj Kůs	6	(1,2,1,1,1)
12	(Poland) (8) Szymon Kiełbasa	4	(2,e,0,0,2)
13	(Slovenia) (3) Matic Voldrih	4	(1,1,1,0,1)
14	(Slovenia) (7) Aleksander Čonda	3	(1,0,2,0,0)
15	(Latvia) (2) Maksims Bogdanovs	3	(0,0,1,1,1)
16	(Slovakia) (6) Martin Vaculík	1	(e,1,-,-,-)
17	(Czech Republic) (17) Jan Holub III	0	(e,0)
18	(Slovenia) (18) Matija Duh	0	(0)

=== Kumla ===
- Semi-Final 2
- 27 June 2009 (14:00)
- (Sweden) Sannaheds Motorstadion, Kumla
- Referee: Craig Ackroyd
- Jury President: Boris Kotnjek

Pos.	Rider	Points	Details
1	(Sweden) (14) Thomas H. Jonasson	13+3	(3,3,3,1,3)
2	(Poland) (12) Grzegorz Zengota	13+2	(2,3,3,2,3)
3	(Poland) (1) Przemysław Pawlicki	12	(3,3,3,0,3)
4	(Denmark) (15) Kenni Larsen	11	(2,3,2,2,2)
5	(Sweden) (2) Ludvig Lindgren	10	(2,2,0,3,3)
6	(Poland) (7) Maciej Janowski	9	(e,2,3,3,1)
7	(Denmark) (5) Nicolai Klindt	9	(1,2,1,3,2)
8	(Sweden) (9) Simon Gustafsson	9	(1,1,2,3,2)
9	(United States) (4) Ricky Wells	5+3	(1,2,1,0,1)
10	(Australia) (13) Justin Sedgmen	5+2	(1,0,0,2,2)
11	(Poland) (10) Patryk Pawlaszczyk	5+1	(0,1,2,2,0)
12	(Poland) (6) Paweł Zmarlik	4	(3,e,0,1,e)
13	(Germany) (8) Max Dilger	4	(2,0,1,0,1)
14	(Australia) (17) Kozza Smith	3	(3)
15	(Germany) (11) Kevin Wölbert	3	(t/-,0,2,1,0)
16	(Poland) (16) Artur Mroczka	3	(0,1,1,1,e)
17	(Denmark) (3) Peter Kildemand	2	(0,1,0,0,1)

== Final ==
- Final
- 3 October 2009 (15:30)
- (Croatia) Stadium Milenium, Goričan
- Referee: Marek Wojaczek
- Jury President: Armando Castagna

Placing	Rider	Total	1	2	3	4	5	6	7	8	9	10	11	12	13	14	15	16	17	18	19	20	Pts	Pos	21
1	(Australia) (9) Darcy Ward	13			3		3						3					2		2			13	1	
2	(Croatia) (3) Jurica Pavlic	12	2						2				2				3				3		12	3	3
3	(Denmark) (5) Patrick Hougaard	12		3			2					2					2					3	12	4	2
4	(United Kingdom) (7) Tai Woffinden	12		T/-					3					3	3					3			12	2	1
5	(Poland) (8) Maciej Janowski	11		2						3			Fx			3			3				11	5	
6	(Denmark) (2) Nicolai Klindt	10	3					1				3				2				1			10	6	
7	(Poland) (10) Grzegorz Zengota	8			F1			3						2			1		2				8	7	
8	(Sweden) (6) Simon Gustafsson	7		0				Fx			3							3			1		7	8	
9	(United Kingdom) (12) Lewis Bridger	7			2					2		1			2						0		7	9	
10	(Denmark) (13) Kenni Larsen	7				2	1							1		1					2		7	10	
11	(Sweden) (14) Thomas H. Jonasson	6				3		2					1		F3							-	6	11	
12	(Russia) (15) Artem Laguta	4				1			1			0						1	1				4	12	
13	(Hungary) (17) József Tabaka	3		1																		2	3	13	
14	(Poland) (1) Michał Mitko	3	1				0				1				1				F				3	14	
15	(Latvia) (16) Vjačeslavs Giruckis	2				F				0	2						0			0			2	15	
16	(United States) (11) Ricky Wells	2			1				0		0					0						1	2	16	
17	(Sweden) (4) Ludvig Lindgren	1	0							1				0				0				0	1	17	
Placing	Rider	Total	1	2	3	4	5	6	7	8	9	10	11	12	13	14	15	16	17	18	19	20	Pts	Pos	21

m - exclusion for exceeding two minute time allowance • t - exclusion for touching the tapes • x - other exclusion • e - retired or mechanical failure • f - fell • ns - non-starter • nc - non-classify

gate A - inside	gate B	gate C	gate D - outside

== See also ==
- 2009 Team Speedway Junior World Championship
- 2009 Speedway Grand Prix
- 2009 Individual Speedway Junior European Championship
