= 2008 Speedway Under-21 World Championship =

European motorcycle speedway event

World Under-21 Championship
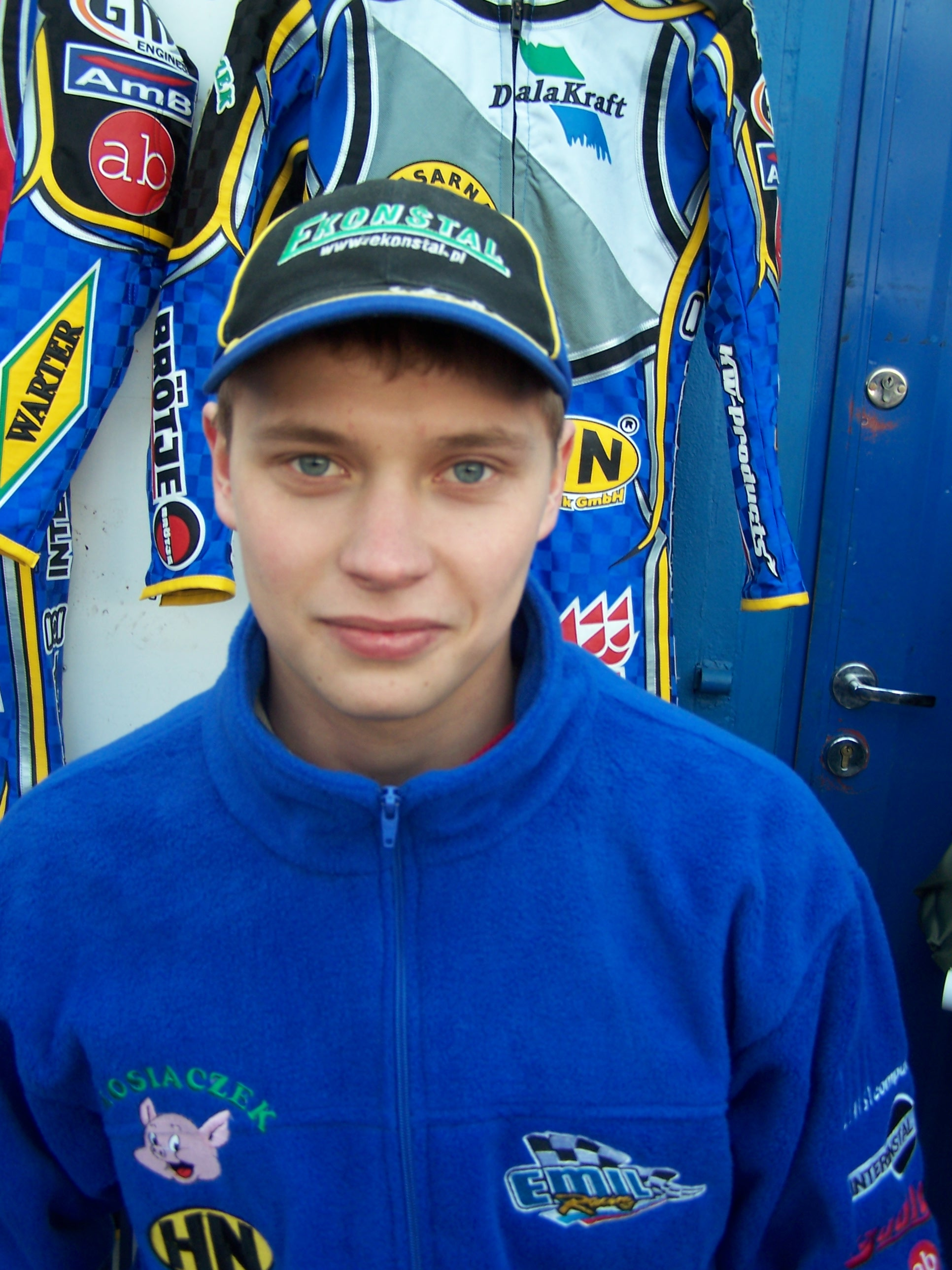
- Emil Saifutdinov successfully defended his title

The 2008 Individual Speedway Junior World Championship was the 32nd edition of the World motorcycle speedway Under-21 Championships.

The title was won by Emil Sajfutdinov from Russia and was the first rider to win the title twice.

== Calendar ==
Date	Venue	Winner	
Qualifying Rounds
18 May	(Germany) Norden	(Poland) Robert Kasprzak	result
18 May	(Poland) Zielona Góra	(Australia) Chris Holder	result
25 May	(Slovakia) Žarnovica	(Russia) Emil Saifutdinov	result
31 May	(Finland) Pori	(Sweden) Linus Eklöf	result
31 May	(Germany) Güstrow	(Australia) Troy Batchelor	result
Semi-finals
15 June	(England) Hoddesdon	(Australia) Troy Batchelor	result
19 July	(Croatia) Goričan	(Croatia) Jurica Pavlic	result
Final
4 September	(Czech Republic) Pardubice	(Russia) Emil Sajfutdinov	result

== Allocation ==
References:
- Riders placed 1st to 6th + 1R in QR 1, QR 2, QR 3 and QR 4 will qualify for the semi-final.
- Riders placed 1st to 6th in QR 5 will qualify for the semi-final.
- Riders placed 1st to 8th + 1R in semi-finals will qualify for the Final. But, if no Slovenia riders qualify for the Final, then only 7 + 1R riders will qualify from Semi-Final 2.
- Riders will be balloted for the semi-finals and the Final.

FMNs	Total	+/-	Qualifying Rounds					Semi-Finals		F
FMNs	Total	+/-	1	2	3	4	5	1	2	F
FMNs	Total	+/-	(Germany)	(Poland)	(Latvia)	(Finland)	(Germany)	(United Kingdom)	(Croatia)	(Slovenia)
Czech Republic (ACCR)	6	+2	2	1	2		1			
(United Kingdom) Great Britain (ACU)	7	+1		2	2		2	1		
United States (AMA)	2	-	2							
Slovenia (AMZS)	3	-		2			1			
Germany (DMSB)	8	+2	3	2			3			
Denmark (DMU)	7	+1	1			6				
France (FFM)	2	-					2			
Italy (FMI)	1	-	1							
Ukraine (FMU)	2	-		2						
Croatia (HMS)	3	+1			2				1	
Netherlands (KNMV)	2	-	2							
Latvia (LaMSF)	2	-			2					
Australia (MA)	4	+1		2			2			
Hungary (MAMS)	3	+1	1		2					
Russia (MFR)	5	+1		2	2		1			
New Zealand (MNZ)	2	+1	2							
Norway (NMF)	1	-				1				
Austria (OeAMTC)	2	-					2			
Poland (PZM)	8	+1	2	3	2		1			
Slovakia (SMF)	2	+1			2					
Finland (SML)	3	-				3				
Sweden (SVEMO)	7	+1				6	1			
TOTAL	82	+14	16	16	16	16	16	1	1	

== Qualifying rounds ==
=== Norden ===
- Qualifying Round 1
- 18 May 2008 (2:30 pm)
- (Germany) Motodrom Halbemond, Norden
- Jury President: Boris Kotnjek

Pos.	Rider	Points	Details
1	(Poland) (2) Robert Kasprzak	14	(3,3 2,3,3)
2	(Poland) (13) Adam Kajoch	13+3	(3,2,3,2,3)
3	(Denmark) (7) Patrick Hougaard	13+2	(3,3,2,3,2)
4	(Czech Republic) (12) Hynek Štichauer	13+1	(3,3,3,2,2)
5	(Germany) (1) Max Dilger	11	(2,3,3,0,3)
6	(United States) (14) Ricky Wells	9	(2,1,3,1,2)
7	(Germany) (4) Richard Speiser	8+3	(X,2,1,2,3)
8	(Hungary) (15) József Tabaka	8+2	(1,2,0,3,2)
9	(Netherlands) (6) Jannick De Jong	8+1	(2,2,2,1,1)
10	(Czech Republic) (5) Adam Vandírek	7	(1,1,1,3,1)
11	(New Zealand) (16) Jade Mudeway	4	(0,0,1,2,1)
12	(Germany) (3) Sönke Petersen	4	(1,1,2,E,0)
13	(New Zealand) (8) Grant Tregoning	4	(0,1,1,1,1)
14	(Germany) (10) Dennis Wienke	3	(2,0,0,1,0)
15	(United States) (9) Alex Marcucci	1	(1,0,0,0,0)
16	(Netherlands) (11) Henry van der Steen	0	(E,0,0,0,0)

=== Zielona Góra ===
- Qualifying Round 2
- 18 May 2008 (7:15 pm)
- (Poland) Zielona Góra Speedway Stadium, Zielona Góra
- Referee: Pavel Vana
- Jury President: Anthony Noel
- Attendance: 1,500

Pos.	Rider	Points	Details
1	(Australia) (2) Chris Holder	15	(3,3,3,3,3)
2	(Poland) (3) Adrian Gomólski	12	(1,3,2,3,3)
3	(Poland) (16) Mateusz Szczepaniak	11	(3,1,3,2,2)
4	(Ukraine) (1) Andriy Karpov	10	(2,3,1,1,3)
5	(Poland) (14) Grzegorz Zengota	9+3	(2,2,1,3,1)
6	(United Kingdom) (4) William Lawson	9+2	(0,2,3,1,3)
7	(Russia) (8) Artem Vodyakov	9+E3	(2,3,0,2,2)
8	(Australia) (10) Tyron Proctor	8	(3,1,2,1,1)
9	(Russia) (12) Alexander Kosolapkin	8	(2,E4,2,2,2)
10	(Germany) (9) Frank Facher	7	(1,0,3,2,1)
11	(United Kingdom) (11) Adam Roynon	7	(0,2,2,1,2)
12	(Germany) (15) Kevin Wölbert	6	(1,1,1,3,0)
13	(Czech Republic) (7) Martin Gavenda	3	(3,0,0,0,0)
14	(Slovenia) (5) Aleksander Čonda	3	(1,2,0,0,E4)
15	(Slovenia) (13) Matija Duh	3	(0,1,1,0,1)
16	(Ukraine) (6) Andriy Kobrin	0	(0,0,X/F,0,0)

=== Žarnovica ===
- Qualifying Round 3
- 25 May 2008 (2:30 pm)
- (Slovakia) Speedway Žarnovica, Žarnovica
- Referee: Chrystian Forschaeuer
- Jury President: David White
- Attendance: 2,000

Pos.	Rider	Points	Details
1	(Russia) (10) Emil Saifutdinov	15	(3,3,3,3,3)
2	(United Kingdom) (5) Lewis Bridger	12+3	(3,2,2,2,3)
3	(Latvia) (1) Maksims Bogdanovs	12+2	(2,3,3,2,2)
4	(Slovakia) (4) Martin Vaculík	11	(3,3,0,3,2)
5	(Czech Republic) (2) Filip Šitera	11	(1,2,3,3,2)
6	(Czech Republic) (7) Matěj Kůs	10+3	(2,X,2,3,3)
7	(United Kingdom) (13) Josh Auty	10+2	(3,1,1,2,3)
8	(Poland) (12) Patryk Pawlaszczyk	8	(2,2,1,1,2)
9	(Latvia) (11) Jevgēņijs Karavackis	7	(1,3,2,0,1)
10	(Poland) (8) Michał Mitko	7	(1,1,3,1,1)
11	(Croatia) (3) Nikola Martinec	6	(0,2,2,1,1)
12	(Croatia) (9) Nikola Pigac	4	(0,0,1,2,1)
13	(Hungary) (14) Roland Kovács	3	(2,1,0,0,0)
14	(Slovakia) (17) Ján Holub	2	(1,-,0,1,0)
15	(Hungary) (6) Tomás Szilágyi	1	(0,0,1,0,0)
16	(Slovakia) (18) Michal Dudek	1	(E,1,0)
17	(Slovakia) (16) Rastislav Bandzi	0	(-,0,0,0,0)

=== Pori ===
- Scandinavian Qualifying Round 4
- 31 May 2008 (4:00 pm)
- (Finland) Yyterin speedwaystadion, Pori
- Jury President: Christer Bergström

Pos.	Rider	Points	Details
1	(Sweden) (4) Linus Eklöf	13	(2,3,3,2,3)
2	(Sweden) (6) Ludvig Lindgren	12+3	(2,2,3,3,2)
3	(Denmark) (12) Morten Risager	12+2	(2,1,3,3,3)
4	(Sweden) (14) Simon Gustafsson	12+1	(3,3,3,2,1)
5	(Sweden) (8) Kim Nilsson	12+E	(3,2,3,2,3)
6	(Denmark) (16) Nicolai Klindt	10+3	(2,0,2,3,3)
7	(Denmark) (10) Leon Madsen	10+E1	(3,1,2,2,2)
8	(Sweden) (1) Thomas H. Jonasson	8	(3,3,E,1,1)
9	(Denmark) (5) Jan Graversen	8	(1,2,2,1,2)
10	(Denmark) (2) Peter Juul Larsen	5	(1,F,1,3,E)
11	(Sweden) (11) Robin Törnqvist	5	(1,2,1,1,0)
12	(Finland) (3) Kalle Katajisto	4	(E,3,1,0,0)
13	(Finland) (17) Niko Siltaniemi	3	(0,1,2)
14	(Norway) (7) Tord Solberg	2	(0,0,1,0,1)
15	(Finland) (15) Teemu Lahti	1	(E,1,0,0,0)
16	(Finland) (13) Jari Mäkinen	1	(E,0,E,0,1)
17	(Denmark) (9) Kenneth Kruse Hansen	1	(E,1,-,-,-)
18	(Finland) (18) Aarnii Heikkila	0	(0,T/-)

=== Güstrow ===
- Qualifying Round 5
- 31 May 2008 (8:15 pm)
- (Germany) Güstrow Speedway Stadium, Güstrow
- Jury President: Christian Bouin

Pos.	Rider	Points	Details
1	(Australia) (13) Troy Batchelor	15	(3,3,3,3,3)
2	(Germany) (2) Tobias Busch	14	(3,3,3,2,3)
3	(Australia) (8) Robert Ksiezak	12+3	(3,2,3,1,3)
4	(Poland) (4) Kamil Brzozowski	12+E	(1,3,2,3,3)
5	(Russia) (11) Igor Kononov	10	(3,3,2,F,2)
6	(Germany) (6) Robert Baumann	10	(1,2,3,2,2)
7	(Germany) (10) Erik Pudel	7	(2,1,0,3,1)
8	(Sweden) (16) Niklas Larsson	7	(2,1,1,2,1)
9	(Czech Republic) (3) Michael Hádek	7	(2,2,1,1,1)
10	(United Kingdom) (14) Ben Barker	6	(X,X,2,3,1)
11	(United Kingdom) (7) Andrew Tully	6	(2,1,1,E,2)
12	(Austria) (1) Manuel Novotny	4	(0,2,0,2,E)
13	(Slovenia) (15) Matic Voldrih	4	(1,0,-,1,2)
14	(France) (12) Théo Di Palma	3	(1,0,1,1,0)
15	(France) (5) Maxime Mazeau	2	(0,0,2,0,0)
16	(Austria) (9) Hans Peter Kulterer	1	(X,1,0,0,0)
17	(Germany) (17) Sergej Malyschew	0	(0)
-	(Germany) (18) Arne Ledwig	-	-

== Semi-finals ==
=== Rye House ===
- Semi-Final 1
- 15 June 2008 (3:00 pm)
- (England) Rye House Stadium, Hoddesdon
- Referee: Pavel Vana
- Jury President: Armando Castagna

Pos.	Rider	Points	Details
1	(Australia) (13) Troy Batchelor	15	(3,3,3,3,3)
2	(United Kingdom) (12) Tai Woffinden	13	(3,3,3,2,2)
3	(Australia) (3) Chris Holder	12+3	(2,3,3,3,1)
4	(Denmark) (15) Morten Risager	12+2	(2,2,2,3,3)
5	(Poland) (14) Grzegorz Zengota	9	(1,3,2,1,2)
6	(United Kingdom) (7) Lewis Bridger	8	(2,0,0,3,3)
7	(United Kingdom) (6) William Lawson	8	(3,1,3,1,0)
8	(Sweden) (16) Ludvig Lindgren	8	(0,2,2,2,2)
9	(Sweden) (11) Simon Gustafsson	7+3	(1,1,0,2,3)
10	(Poland) (10) Mateusz Szczepaniak	7+2	(2,2,2,0,1)
11	(Sweden) (1) Linus Eklöf	7+1	(3,1,1,0,2)
12	(United States) (9) Ricky Wells	6	(0,2,1,2,1)
13	(Germany) (8) Tobias Busch	3	(1,1,0,1,0)
14	(Australia) (18) Tyron Proctor	2	(1,1)
15	(Germany) (2) Max Dilger	1	(1,0,0,0,F)
16	(Poland) (4) Robert Kasprzak	1	(0,0,1,E,0)
17	(United Kingdom) (17) Josh Auty	1	(0,1)
18	(Sweden) (5) Kim Nilsson	0	(X/F,-,-,-,-)

=== Goričan ===
- Semi-Final 2
- 19 July 2008 (8:30 pm)
- (Croatia) Stadium Milenium, Goričan
- Jury President: Armando Castagna

Pos.	Rider	Points	Details
1	(Croatia) (6) Jurica Pavlic	15	(3,3,3,3,3)
2	(Denmark) (12) Patrick Hougaard	13	(3,2,3,3,2)
3	(Czech Republic) (11) Matěj Kůs	12	(2,2,2,3,3)
4	(Russia) (4) Emil Saifutdinov	11	(3,3,3,2,Fx)
5	(Ukraine) (8) Andriy Karpov	9	(1,1,3,1,3)
6	(Poland) (3) Adrian Gomólski	8	(2,3,E/start,3,Fx)
7	(Russia) (2) Igor Kononov	7+3	(Fx,1,1,2,3)
8	(Czech Republic) (7) Filip Šitera	7+2	(2,0,2,1,2
9	(Slovakia) (10) Martin Vaculík	7+1	(1,2,1,2,1)
10	(Poland) (15) Kamil Brzozowski	7+Fx	(2,1,2,Fx,2)
11	(Poland) (13) Adam Kajoch	5	(1,3,X,0,1)
12	(Germany) (9) Robert Baumann	5	(0,2,1,1,1)
13	(Australia) (16) Robert Ksiezak	4	(3,F2,E3,1,0)
14	(Denmark) (1) Nicolai Klindt	4	(1,E4,1,2,E2)
15	(Czech Republic) (5) Hynek Štichauer	3	(0,1,0,F4,2)
16	(Latvia) (14) Maksims Bogdanovs	2	(Fx,0,2,0,E/start)

== Final ==
- 4 October 2008 (14:00 UTC+2)
- (Czech Republic) Svítkov Stadion, Pardubice
- Referee: Wojciech Grodzki
- Jury President: Jörgen L. Jensen
- Change:
  - (7) (Poland) Adrian Gomólski → Vaculík

Placing	Rider	Total	1	2	3	4	5	6	7	8	9	10	11	12	13	14	15	16	17	18	19	20	Pts	Pos	21
1	(Russia) (3) Emil Saifutdinov	14	2						3				3				3				3		14	1	
2	(Australia) (12) Chris Holder	12			3					3		3			2						1		12	2	3
3	(Croatia) (9) Jurica Pavlic	12			2		3						1					3		3			12	3	2
4	(Australia) (4) Troy Batchelor	11	3							2				1				2				3	11	4	
5	(Slovakia) (7) Martin Vaculík	9		2					0					3	3					1			9	5	
6	(Czech Republic) (10) Matěj Kůs	8			0			3						0			2		3				8	6	
7	(Poland) (2) Grzegorz Zengota	8	1					0				2				3				2			8	7	
8	(Denmark) (5) Patrick Hougaard	8		3			2					1					0					2	8	8	
9	(Sweden) (8) Ludvig Lindgren	7		1						0			2			2			2				7	9	
10	(United Kingdom) (6) Lewis Bridger	6		0				1			3							0			2		6	10	
11	(Russia) (15) Igor Kononov	6				3			1			0						1	1				6	11	
12	(Denmark) (13) Morten Risager	6				2	1							2		1					0		6	12	
13	(Ukraine) (11) Andriy Karpov	4			1				2		0					0						1	4	13	
14	(United Kingdom) (16) William Lawson	4				1				1	1						1			0			4	14	
15	(United Kingdom) (14) Tai Woffinden	3				T		2					0		1							0	3	15	
16	(Czech Republic) (1) Filip Šitera	2	0				0				2				0				E4				2	16	
17	(Sweden) (17) Simon Gustafsson	0				0																	0	17	
	(Poland) (18) Kamil Brzozowski	0																					0		
Placing	Rider	Total	1	2	3	4	5	6	7	8	9	10	11	12	13	14	15	16	17	18	19	20	Pts	Pos	21

m - exclusion for exceeding two minute time allowance • t - exclusion for touching the tapes • x - other exclusion • e - retired or mechanical failure • f - fell • ns - non-starter • nc - non-classify

gate A - inside	gate B	gate C	gate D - outside

Heat after heat:

1. Batchelor, Saifutdinov, Zengota, Sitera
2. Hougaard, Vaculík, Lindgren, Bridger
3. Holder, Pavlic, Karpow, Kus
4. Kononow, Risager, Lawson, Gustafsson (Woffinden - T)
5. Pavlic, Hougaard, Risager, Sitera
6. Kus, Woffinden, Bridger, Zengota
7. Saifutdinov, Karpow, Kononow, Vaculík
8. Holder, Batchelor, Lawson, Lindgren
9. Bridger, Sitera, Lawson, Karpow
10. Holder, Zengota, Hougaard, Kononow
11. Saifutdinov, Lindgren, Pavlic, Woffinden
12. Vaculík, Risager, Batchelor, Kus
13. Vaculík, Holder, Woffinden, Sitera
14. Zengota, Lindgren, Risager, Karpow
15. Saifutdinov, Kus, Lawson, Hougaard
16. Pavlic, Batchelor, Kononow, Bridger
17. Kus, Lindgren, Kononow, Sitera (e4)
18. Pavlic, Zengota, Vaculík, Lawson
19. Saifutdinov, Bridger, Holder, Risager
20. Batchelor, Hougaard, Karpow, Woffinden
  Silver medal Run-Off:
21. Holder, Pavlic
