= 2010 Individual Speedway Junior European Championship =

Motorcycle racing competition

Seasons
- ← 2009 2011 →

The 2010 European Individual Speedway Junior Championship is the 13th edition of the UEM Individual Speedway Junior European Championship. The Final took place on 24 July 2010 in Goričan, Croatia. The champion title was won by Dennis Andersson from Sweden who beat two Poles Przemysław Pawlicki and Patryk Dudek in Run-off. Pawlicki was a defending champion. It was first champion title for Sweden since 2004, when Antonio Lindbäck won at Rybnik, Poland. It was second final in Goričan; in 2006 won host rider Jurica Pavlič. In 2010 the only Croatian rider, Dino Kovacic, finished fourth.

== Semi-finals ==
=== SF One - Rawicz ===
- 5 June 2010
- Rawicz, Greater Poland Voivodeship
- Florian Kapała Stadium (Length: 330 m)
- Referee and Jury President: (Denmark) J. Steentoft
- References
- Changes:

Draw 16. (Russia) → (United Kingdom)
Draw 4. (Germany) René Deddens → Reserve 17.

Pos.	Rider	Points	Details
1	(Poland) (10) Patryk Dudek	14	(2,3,3,3,3)
2	(Poland) (9) Przemysław Pawlicki	12	(3,2,3,3,1)
3	(Poland) (7) Kacper Gomólski	10+3	(3,3,R,2,2)
4	(Poland) (1) Tobiasz Musielak	10+2	(3,1,3,1,2)
5	(Czech Republic) (2) Jan Holub III	10+1	(2,2,1,2,3)
6	(Poland) (17) Mateusz Łukaszewski	9	(0,3,2,2,2)
7	(Russia) (14) Andrey Kudryashov	8	(R,R,2,3,3)
8	(Ukraine) (8) Kiril Tcukanov	8	(2,2,1,3,F)
9	(Slovenia) (12) Aljosa Remih	7	(1,R,3,0,3)
10	(Czech Republic) (5) Václav Milík, Jr.	7	(1,3,2,1,F)
11	(United Kingdom) (16) Kyle Newman	5	(T/-,1,2,2,R)
12	(Germany) (15) Danny Maasen	5	(1,2,0,1,1)
13	(Ukraine) (13) Siergiej Borysenko	5	(2,0,1,1,1)
14	(Netherlands) (6) Nick Lourens	4	(0,1,1,0,2)
15	(Poland) (18) Kamil Cieślar	3	(3)
16	(United Kingdom) (3) Brendan Johnson	2	(1,1,0,0,R)
17	(Belgium) (11) Wim Kennis	1	(0,0,0,0,1)

=== SF Two - Herxheim ===
- 4 July 2010
- (Germany) Herxheim
- Waldstadion (Length: 283 m)
- Referee and Jury President: (Poland) Wojciech Grodzki
- References
- Change:

Draw 6. (Croatia) → (Germany)
Draw 12. (Slovenia) Ladislav Vida → (Slovenia) Matic Ivacic

Pos.	Rider	Points	Details
1	(Poland) (15) Emil Pulczyński	14	(3,3,3,3,2)
2	(Croatia) (5) Dino Kovacic	12+3	(3,2,2,2,3)
3	(Russia) (1) Sergey Karachinchev	12+X	(3,3,1,2,3)
4	(Poland) (8) Łukasz Cyran	11	(1,3,3,3,1)
5	(Russia) (14) Vitaliy Belousov	9	(Fx,3,1,3,2)
6	(Ukraine) (7) Andriej Kobrin	8+3	(2,X/x2,3,1,2)
7	(Germany) (16) Kai Huckenbeck	8+2	(2,2,0,3,1)
8	(Germany) (6) Marco Gaschka	8+1	(Fx,1,3,2,2)
9	(Czech Republic) (3) Pavel Pucko	8+F	(2,1,2,R,3)
10	(Germany) (11) Marcel Helfer	7	(1,2,2,1,1)
11	(Austria) (9) Lukas Simon	6	(2,1,0,Fx,3)
12	(Slovenia) (12) Matic Ivacic	5	(3,0,1,0,1)
13	(Poland) (13) Marcel Szymko	4	(Fx,Fx,2,2,R)
14	(Slovenia) (10) Nejc Malesic	4	(Fx,2,1,1,0)
15	(France) (2) David Bellego	1	(1,0,0,0,X/x2)
16	(Hungary) (4) Attila Lorincz	1	(0,1,-,X,M/-)
17	(Germany) (17) Michell Hofmann	0	(0,0)
18	(Germany) (18) Nils Hesse	—	—

=== SF Three - Elgane ===
- 20 June 2010
- (Norway) Elgane
- Elgane Motorstadion (Length: 286 m)
- Referee and Jury President: (United Kingdom) A. Steele
- References
- Change:

Draw 8 (Norway) Thomas Gunnestad → Reserve 17

Pos.	Rider	Points	Details
1	(Sweden) (5) Dennis Andersson	15	(3,3,3,3,3)
2	(Denmark) (1) Michael Jepsen Jensen	14	(3,2,3,3,3)
3	(Denmark) (6) Jonas B. Andersen	11+3	(2,2,2,2,3)
4	(Finland) (15) Timo Lahti	11+2	(1,3,2,3,2)
5	(Denmark) (14) Philip Tirsdal	11+F	(3,1,3,2,2)
6	(Sweden) (11) Alexander Edberg	10+3	(3,2,1,3,2)
7	(Denmark) (2) Lasse Bjerre	10+2	(2,3,F,2,3)
8	(Finland) (7) Niko Siltaniemi	8	(1,1,3,1,2)
9	(Denmark) (3) Patrick Bjerregaard	6	(0,0,2,2,2)
10	(Sweden) (12) Tim Gudmundsson	6	(2,2,1,R,1)
11	(Sweden) (4) Anton Gothberg	5	(1,3,1,0,0)
12	(Sweden) (10) Daniel Henderson	4	(T/-,0,2,1,1)
13	(Sweden) (13) Anton Rosén	4	(2,1,Fx,1,N)
14	(Denmark) (9) Thomas Jorgensen	3	(1,0,1,1,0)
15	(Norway) (16) Lars Daniel Gunnestad	2	(0,1,R,0,1)
16	(Norway) (17) Patrick Herold	0	(0,0,0,0,0)
17	(Norway) (18) Bjoern Skæveland	0	(0)

Reserve 18 (Heat 3)

== The Final ==
- 24 July 2010
- (Croatia) Goričan, Međimurje County
- Stadium Milenium (Length: 305 m)
- Referee: (Germany) Frank Ziegler
- Jury President: (Denmark) B.F. Thomsen
- References

Placing	Rider	Total	1	2	3	4	5	6	7	8	9	10	11	12	13	14	15	16	17	18	19	20	Pts	Pos	21
1	(Sweden) (3) Dennis Andersson	14	2						3				3				3				3		14	-	3
2	(Poland) (2) Przemysław Pawlicki	14	3					3				3				2				3			14	-	2
3	(Poland) (13) Patryk Dudek	14				3	3							3		3					2		14	-	1
4	(Croatia) (15) Dino Kovacic	11				2			2			2						3	2				11	4	
5	(Poland) (12) Emil Pulczyński	10			3					3		1			3						0		10	5	
6	(Denmark) (7) Michael Jepsen Jensen	10		3					1					2	2					2			10	6	
7	(Russia) (8) Vitaliy Belousov	8		0						2			2			1			3				8	7	
8	(Poland) (10) Tobiasz Musielak	8			2			2						1			2		1				8	8	
9	(Poland) (6) Łukasz Cyran	6		2				Fx			1							2			1		6	9	
10	(Finland) (16) Timo Lahti	5				0				1	3						0			1			5	10	
11	(Denmark) (11) Jonas B. Andersen	4			1				0		F					0						3	4	11	
12	(Czech Republic) (1) Jan Holub III	4	1				1				2				0				0				4	12	
13	(Poland) (5) Kacper Gomólski	4		1			2					0					1					Fx	4	13	
14	(Russia) (14) Sergey Karachinchev	4				1		1					1		1							-	4	14	
15	(Poland) (17) Mateusz Łukaszewski	2																				2	2	15	
16	(Denmark) (4) Philip Tirsdal	1	0							0				0				1				Fx	1	16	
17	(Ukraine) (9) Andriej Kobrin	0			0		F						R					0		R2			0	17	
	(Sweden) (18) Alexander Edberg	0																					0		
Placing	Rider	Total	1	2	3	4	5	6	7	8	9	10	11	12	13	14	15	16	17	18	19	20	Pts	Pos	21

m - exclusion for exceeding two minute time allowance • t - exclusion for touching the tapes • x - other exclusion • e - retired or mechanical failure • f - fell • ns - non-starter • nc - non-classify

gate A - inside	gate B	gate C	gate D - outside

Heat after heat:

1. (59.40) Pawlicki, Andersson, Holub, Tirsdal
2. (59.93) Jensen, Cyran, Gomólski, Bielousow
3. (61.54) Pulczyński, Musielak, Andersen, Kobrin
4. (60.39) Dudek, Kovacic, Karaczincew, Lahti
5. (60.34) Dudek, Gomólski, Holub, Kobrin (F)
6. (60.92) Pawlicki, Musielak, Karaczincew, Cyran (Fx)
7. (62.21) Andersson, Kovacic, Jensen, Andersen
8. (61.73) Pulczyński, Bielousow, Lahti, Tirsdal
9. (62.25) Lahti, Holub, Cyran, Andersen (F)
10. (61.51) Pawlicki, Kovacic, Pulczyński, Gomólski
11. (61.64) Andersson, Bielousow, Karaczincew, Kobrin (R)
12. (61.64) Dudek, Jensen, Musielak, Tirsdal
13. (61.59) Pulczyński, Jensen, Karaczincew, Holub
14. (60.93) Dudek, Pawlicki, Bielousow, Andersen
15. (61.79) Andersson, Musielak, Gomólski, Lahti
16. (62.50) Kovacic, Cyran, Tirsdal, Kobrin
17. (63.46) Bielousow, Kovacic, Musielak, Holub
18. (62.02) Pawlicki, Jensen, Lahti, Kobrin (R2)
19. (61.04) Andersson, Dudek, Cyran, Pulczyński
20. (69.03) Andersen, Lukaszewski, Gomólski (Fx), Karaczincew (N), Tirsdal (Fx)
  Medal's run-off:
21. (?) Andersson, Pawlicki, Dudek

== See also ==
- 2010 Team Speedway Junior European Championship
- 2010 Individual Speedway European Championship
