= 2011 Speedway Under-21 World Championship =

World motorcycle speedway event

World Under-21 Championship
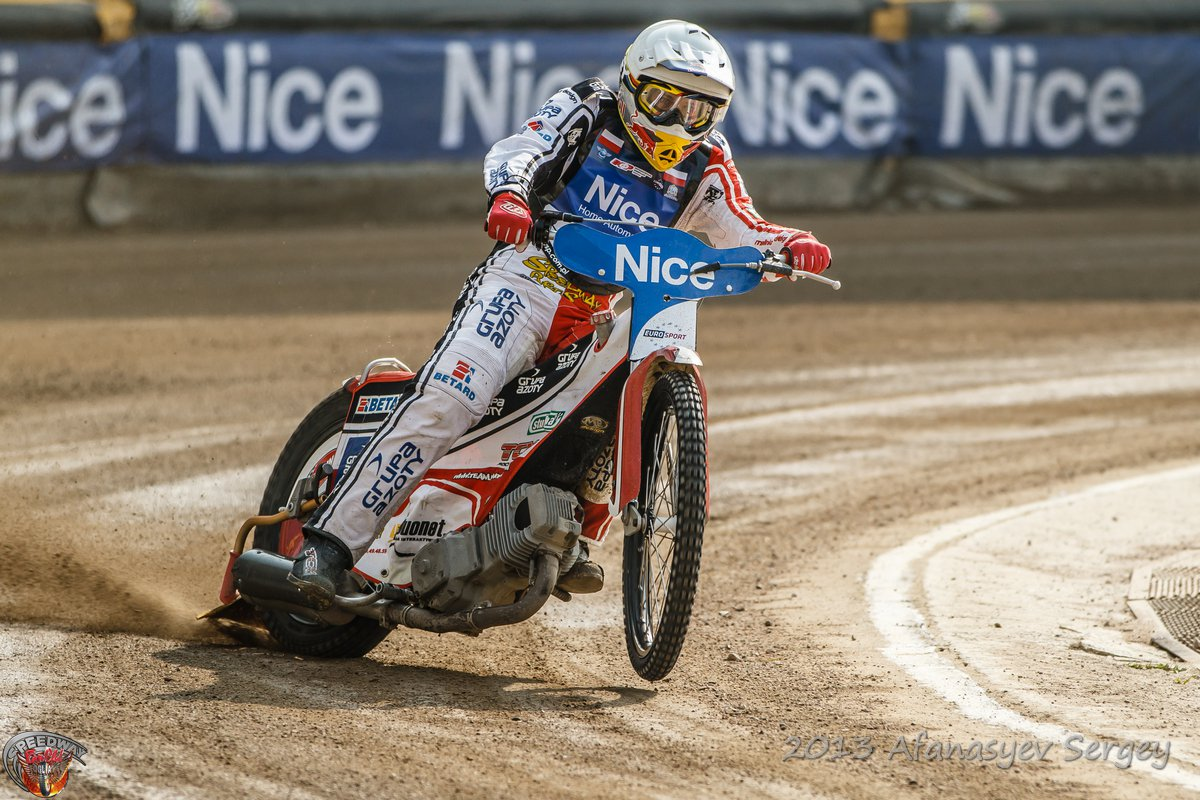
- Maciej Janowski

The 2011 Individual Speedway Junior World Championship was the 35th edition of the FIM World motorcycle speedway Under-21 Championships.

The event final was increased from three races to four races between 23 July and 9 October 2011.

Maciej Janowski of Poland became the new champion.

== Qualification ==
In five Qualifying round will started 80 riders and to Semi-finals will qualify top 6 from each meetings. This 30 riders and 2 riders from Semi-final' host federations will started in two Semi-finals. The top 7 riders from both SF will automatically qualify for all Final meetings.

== Riders ==
There will be fourteen permanent riders (riders placed 1st to 7th in both semi finals will automatically qualify for all Final meetings). Two Wild Card riders will be nominated to each final meeting (approval and nomination by CCP Bureau). Two Track Reserve riders will be nominated by national federation. In case of the absence of one or more riders in the final meetings, the first available Qualified Substitute rider or riders will be elevated for that meeting, and take the place(s) of the relevant missing rider(s).

=== Permanent riders ===
Top 7 riders from Semi-final One in Žarnovica, Slovakia

1. (Denmark) Michael Jepsen Jensen (19)
2. (Slovakia) Martin Vaculík (21)
3. (Sweden) Dennis Andersson (20)
4. (Australia) Darcy Ward (19)
5. (Poland) Patryk Dudek (19)
6. (Poland) Bartosz Zmarzlik (16)
7. (Russia) Vadim Tarasenko (17)

Top 7 riders from Semi-final Two in Gniezno, Poland

1. (Ukraine) Aleksandr Loktaev (17)
2. (Poland) Przemysław Pawlicki (20)
3. (Sweden) Simon Gustafsson (21)
4. (Poland) Piotr Pawlicki, Jr. (17)
5. (Poland) Maciej Janowski (20)
6. (Croatia) Dino Kovačić (?)
7. (Poland) Oskar Fajfer (17)

== Final Series ==
#	Date	Venue	Winners	Runner-up	3rd place
1	24 July	(England) Poole	(Australia) Darcy Ward	(Poland) Maciej Janowski	(Sweden) Dennis Andersson
2	28 August	(Denmark) Holsted	(Poland) Maciej Janowski	(Slovakia) Martin Vaculík	(Sweden) Dennis Andersson
3	1 October	(Czech Republic) Pardubice	(Poland) Maciej Janowski	(Poland) Przemysław Pawlicki	(Poland) Piotr Pawlicki, Jr.
4	9 October	(Poland) Gniezno	(Poland) Przemysław Pawlicki	(Australia) Darcy Ward	(Poland) Patryk Dudek

=== Final One ===
- 24 July 2011
- (England) Wimborne Road, Poole
- Referee: Frank Ziegler / Jury President: Armando Castagna

Placing	Rider	Total	1	2	3	4	5	6	7	8	9	10	11	12	13	14	15	16	17	18	19	20	Pts	Pos	21
1	(Australia) (11) Darcy Ward	14			3				3		3					2						3	14	1	3
2	(Poland) (12) Maciej Janowski	14			2					3		3			3						3		14	2	2
3	(Sweden) (2) Dennis Andersson	14	3					3				2				3				3			14	3	R
4	(Poland) (5) Piotr Pawlicki, Jr.	12		3			3					1					3					2	12	4	
5	(Poland) (4) Patryk Dudek	9	2							1				3				3				0	9	5	
6	(Poland) (14) Przemysław Pawlicki	9				3		F					3		2							1	9	6	
7	(United Kingdom) (8) Joe Haines^{Substitute}	8		1						2			2			0			3				8	7	
8	(Slovakia) (1) Martin Vaculík	8	1				2				2				1				2				8	8	
9	(Denmark) (13) Michael Jepsen Jensen	8				2	1							2		1					2		8	9	
10	(Croatia) (15) Dino Kovačić	6				1			2			0						2	1				6	10	
11	(United Kingdom) (7) Steven Worrall^{WC}	4		0					1					1	0					2			4	11	
12	(Poland) (16) Oskar Fajfer	3				F				0	1						2			0			3	12	
13	(United Kingdom) (17) Paul Starke^{TR}	3						2						0				1			0		3	13	
14	(Poland) (9) Bartosz Zmarzlik	3			1		0						1					Fx		1			3	14	
15	(Sweden) (6) Simon Gustafsson	2		2				F/-			-							-			-		2	15	
16	(United Kingdom) (3) Jerran Hart^{WC}	2	F						0				0				1				1		2	16	
17	(United Kingdom) (18) Ashley Morris^{TR}	0									0						0		0				0	17	
18	(Ukraine) (10) Aleksandr Loktaev	0			0			Fx						-			-		-				0	18	
Placing	Rider	Total	1	2	3	4	5	6	7	8	9	10	11	12	13	14	15	16	17	18	19	20	Pts	Pos	21

m - exclusion for exceeding two minute time allowance • t - exclusion for touching the tapes • x - other exclusion • e - retired or mechanical failure • f - fell • ns - non-starter • nc - non-classify

gate A - inside	gate B	gate C	gate D - outside

=== Final Two ===
- 28 August 2011
- (Denmark) Holsted Speedway Center, Holsted
- Change:
- Referee: J. Lawrence / Jury President: A. Grodzki

Placing	Rider	Total	1	2	3	4	5	6	7	8	9	10	11	12	13	14	15	16	17	18	19	20	Pts	Pos	21
1	(Poland) (8) Maciej Janowski	12		2						3			2			2			3				12	1	
2	(Slovakia) (12) Martin Vaculík	11			2					2		3			3						1		11	2	3
3	(Sweden) (7) Dennis Andersson	11		3					1					2	2					3			11	3	2
4	(Poland) (10) Patryk Dudek	10			3			2						3			2		0				10	4	
5	(Poland) (2) Bartosz Zmarzlik	10	3					1				1				3				2			10	5	
6	(Poland) (14) Przemysław Pawlicki	9				3		3					1		0							2	9	6	
7	(Australia) (15) Darcy Ward	9				X			3			2						3	1				9	7	
8	(Denmark) (3) Michael Jepsen Jensen	9	X						2				3				1				3		9	8	
9	(Sweden) (13) Simon Gustafsson	8				2	3							0		1					2		8	9	
10	(Ukraine) (1) Aleksandr Loktaev	8	2				2				1				1				2				8	10	
11	(Poland) (11) Oskar Fajfer	6			1				0		2					0						3	6	11	
12	(Denmark) (17) Mikkel Michelsen^{TR}	4								1							3						4	12	
13	(Russia) (4) Vadim Tarasenko	4	1							X				1				2				0	4	13	
14	(Denmark) (18) Mikkel B. Jensen^{TR}	3									3									0			3	14	
15	(United Kingdom) (5) Joe Haines^{WC}	2		1			0					0					0					1	2	15	
16	(Denmark) (9) René Bach^{WC}	2			0		1						0					R		1			2	16	
17	(Croatia) (6) Dino Kovačić	1		0				0			0							1			0		1	17	
18	(Poland) (16) Piotr Pawlicki, Jr.	0				F/N				-	-						-			-			0	18	
Placing	Rider	Total	1	2	3	4	5	6	7	8	9	10	11	12	13	14	15	16	17	18	19	20	Pts	Pos	21

m - exclusion for exceeding two minute time allowance • t - exclusion for touching the tapes • x - other exclusion • e - retired or mechanical failure • f - fell • ns - non-starter • nc - non-classify

gate A - inside	gate B	gate C	gate D - outside

=== Final Three ===
- 1 October 2011
- (Czech Republic) Svítkov Stadium, Pardubice
- Referee: Christian Froschauer / Jury President: Christer Bergström

Placing	Rider	Total	1	2	3	4	5	6	7	8	9	10	11	12	13	14	15	16	17	18	19	20	Pts	Pos	21
1	(Poland) (11) Maciej Janowski	15			3				3		3					3						3	15	1	
2	(Poland) (6) Przemysław Pawlicki	13		3				3			1							3			3		13	2	3
3	(Poland) (8) Piotr Pawlicki, Jr.	13		2						3			3			2			3				13	3	2
4	(Denmark) (12) Michael Jepsen Jensen	12			2					2		3			3						2		12	4	
5	(Poland) (14) Patryk Dudek	10				3		2					2		1							2	10	5	
6	(Australia) (10) Darcy Ward	9			1			1						3			3		1				9	6	
7	(Slovakia) (13) Martin Vaculík	9				2	3							2		1					1		9	7	
8	(Sweden) (1) Dennis Andersson	8	2				2				2				0				2				8	8	
9	(Ukraine) (7) Aleksandr Loktaev	8		1					2					1	2					2			8	9	
10	(Poland) (9) Oskar Fajfer	5			0		0						1					1		3			5	10	
11	(Poland) (5) Bartosz Zmarzlik	5		X			1					2					2					0	5	11	
12	(Czech Republic) (3) Václav Milík, Jr.^{WC}	4	3						0				0				1				0		4	12	
13	(Denmark) (15) Mikkel B. Jensen^{WC}	4				R4			1			1						2	0				4	13	
14	(Sweden) (16) Simon Gustafsson	3				1				1	0						0			1			3	14	
15	(Russia) (4) Vadim Tarasenko	1	0							0				0				0				1	1	15	
16	(Croatia) (2) Dino Kovačić	1	1					0				R2				0				0			1	16	
	(Czech Republic) (17) Michael Hádek^{TR}	0																					0		
	(Czech Republic) (18) Jan Holub III^{TR}	0																					0		
Placing	Rider	Total	1	2	3	4	5	6	7	8	9	10	11	12	13	14	15	16	17	18	19	20	Pts	Pos	21

m - exclusion for exceeding two minute time allowance • t - exclusion for touching the tapes • x - other exclusion • e - retired or mechanical failure • f - fell • ns - non-starter • nc - non-classify

gate A - inside	gate B	gate C	gate D - outside

=== Final Four ===
- 9 October 2011
- (Poland) Start Gniezno Stadium, Gniezno
- Referee: Jesper Steentoft / Jury President: Armando Castagna

Placing	Rider	Total	1	2	3	4	5	6	7	8	9	10	11	12	13	14	15	16	17	18	19	20	Pts	Pos
1	(Poland) (1) Przemysław Pawlicki	15	3				3				3				3				3				15	1
2	(Australia) (2) Darcy Ward	14	2					3				3				3				3			14	2
3	(Poland) (11) Patryk Dudek	12			3				3		2					1						3	12	3
4	(Poland) (17) Kacper Gomólski^{TR}	10			2			2						3			3		Fx				10	4
5	(Poland) (3) Bartosz Zmarzlik	9	0						2				2				2				3		9	5
6	(Poland) (8) Maciej Janowski	9		1						1			3			2			2				9	6
7	(Denmark) (4) Michael Jepsen Jensen	8	1							3				2				2				Fx	8	7
8	(Denmark) (14) Mikkel Michelsen^{WC}	7				3		0					0		2							2	7	8
9	(Slovakia) (16) Martin Vaculík	7				1				2	1						1			2			7	9
10	(Sweden) (9) Dennis Andersson	6			0		2						1					3		T/-			6	10
11	(Ukraine) (7) Aleksandr Loktaev	6		3					1					0	1					1			6	11
12	(Sweden) (6) Simon Gustafsson	5		2				1			R4							1			1		5	12
13	(Denmark) (15) Mikkel B. Jensen^{Substitute}	4				2			0			1						0	1				4	13
14	(Russia) (5) Vadim Tarasenko	3		0			1					2					0					X	3	14
15	(Poland) (13) Oskar Fajfer	3				0	F4x							1		0					2		3	15
16	(Czech Republic) (12) Václav Milík, Jr.^{WC}	1			1					0		0			0						0		1	16
17	(Poland) (18) Tobiasz Musielak^{TR}	0																		F3			0	17
18	(Poland) (10) Piotr Pawlicki, Jr.	0			F/-			-						-			-		-				0	18
Placing	Rider	Total	1	2	3	4	5	6	7	8	9	10	11	12	13	14	15	16	17	18	19	20	Pts	Pos

m - exclusion for exceeding two minute time allowance • t - exclusion for touching the tapes • x - other exclusion • e - retired or mechanical failure • f - fell • ns - non-starter • nc - non-classify

gate A - inside	gate B	gate C	gate D - outside

=== Silver medal run-off ===
Because after the last heat was a tie between second and third placed riders, a run-off was decided about silver and bronze medals.

Gate	Rider	Place
A	(Poland) Przemysław Pawlicki	2nd
B	(Australia) Darcy Ward	1st

== Classification ==
The meeting classification will be according to the points scored during the meeting (heats 1–20). The total points scored by each rider during each final meeting (heat 1–20) will be credited also as World Championship points. The FIM Speedway Under 21 World Champion will be the rider having collected most World Championship points at the end of the series. In case of a tie between one or more riders in the final overall classification, a run-off will decide the 1st, 2nd and 3rd place. For all other placings, the better-placed rider in the last final meeting will be the better placed rider.

Pos.	Rider	Points	(England)	(Denmark)	(Czech Republic)	(Poland)
Gold	(Poland) Maciej Janowski	50	14	12	15	9
Silver	(Australia) Darcy Ward	46 (+3)	14	9	9	14
Bronze	(Poland) Przemysław Pawlicki	46 (+2)	9	9	13	15
4	(Poland) Patryk Dudek	41	9	10	10	12
5	(Sweden) Dennis Andersson	39	14	11	8	6
6	(Denmark) Michael Jepsen Jensen	37	8	9	12	8
7	(Slovakia) Martin Vaculík	35	8	11	9	7
8	(Poland) Bartosz Zmarzlik	27	3	10	5	9
9	(Poland) Piotr Pawlicki, Jr.	25	12	ns	13	ns
10	(Ukraine) Aleksandr Loktaev	22	0	8	8	6
11	(Sweden) Simon Gustafsson	18	2	8	3	5
12	(Poland) Oskar Fajfer	17	3	6	5	3
13	(Denmark) Mikkel Michelsen	11	–	4	–	7
14	(Denmark) Mikkel B. Jensen	11	–	3	4	4
15	(Poland) Kacper Gomólski	10	–	–	–	10
16	(United Kingdom) Joe Haines	10	8	2	–	–
17	(Russia) Vadim Tarasenko	8	–	4	1	3
18	(Croatia) Dino Kovačić	8	6	1	1	–
19	(Czech Republic) Václav Milík, Jr.	5	–	–	4	1
20	(United Kingdom) Steven Worrall	4	4	–	–	–
21	(United Kingdom) Paul Starke	3	3	–	–	–
22	(Denmark) René Bach	2	–	2	–	–
23	(United Kingdom) Jerran Hart	2	2	–	–	–
24	(Poland) Tobiasz Musielak	0	–	–	–	0
25	(United Kingdom) Ashley Morris	0	0	–	–	–
	(Czech Republic) Michael Hádek	—	–	–	ns	–
	(Czech Republic) Jan Holub III	—	–	–	ns	–

== See also ==
- 2011 Speedway Grand Prix
- 2011 Team Speedway Junior World Championship
