= Malmö Motorstadion =

Stadium in Malmö, Sweden

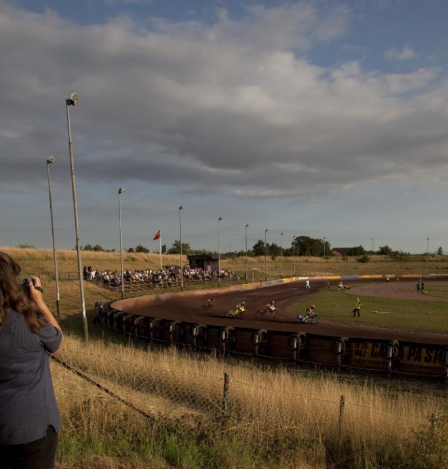
- Location: Elisedalsvägen 13, 213 77 Malmö, Sweden
- Coordinates: 55°34′11″N 13°05′13″E
- Operator: Gnistorna motorcycle speedway
- Opened: 1974
- Length: 347 m (0.216 mi)
- Race lap record: 63.4 sec (Oskar Fajfer, 2016)

Malmö Motorstadion is a motorcycle speedway track in the southeastern outskirts of Malmö, Sweden. The track is located on the Elisedalsvägen road, adjacent to the Malmö BMX track.

The stadium hosts the Gnistorna speedway team that compete in the Swedish Speedway Team Championship and were the third division champions of Sweden in 2009.

== History ==
The track opened in 1974 and in 1978, a mini speedway track was opened, which was built in a space inside the main track.

The venue hosted a Swedish final round of the 1988 Individual Speedway World Championship.

In 2016, Oskar Fajfer set he track record of 63.4 seconds.
