= Jan Holub II =

Czech motorcycle speedway rider

- Born: 24 January 1968 (age 58); České Budějovice, Czechoslovakia
- Nationality: Czech

Career history

Czechoslovakia
- 1988–1989: Rudá Hvězda Praha
- 1990–1991: Olymp Praha

Poland
- 1990: Wrocław
- 1991: Częstochowa
- 1992: Grudziądz
- 1996: Rawicz

Jan Holub II (born 24 January 1968) is a Czech former motorcycle speedway rider. He started in 1986 and 1989 Under-21 World Championship, representing Czechoslovakia.

Holub's father Jan I was a speedway rider, who finished sixth in 1972 Speedway World Pairs Championship. His son Jan III is also a speedway rider.

Exeter Falcons wanted to sign Holub in 1995 but he was refused a work permit.

== Career details ==
=== World Championships ===
- Individual U-21 World Championship
  - 1986 - (Soviet Union) Rivne - track reserve (3 pts) as European Championship
  - 1989 - (Italy) Lonigo - track reserve (4 pts)

=== Domestic competitions ===
- Team Polish Championship (League)
  - 1990 - 2nd place in Second League for Wrocław (Average 2.524)
  - 1991 - 2nd place in Second League for Częstochowa (Average 2.151)
  - 1992 - 8th place in Second League for Grudziądz (Average 2.091)
  - 1996 - 9th place in Second League for Rawicz (Average 0.917)

== See also ==
- Czechoslovakia national speedway team
- Czech Republic national speedway team
