= 1989 Speedway Under-21 World Championship =

European motorcycle speedway event

World Under-21 Championship
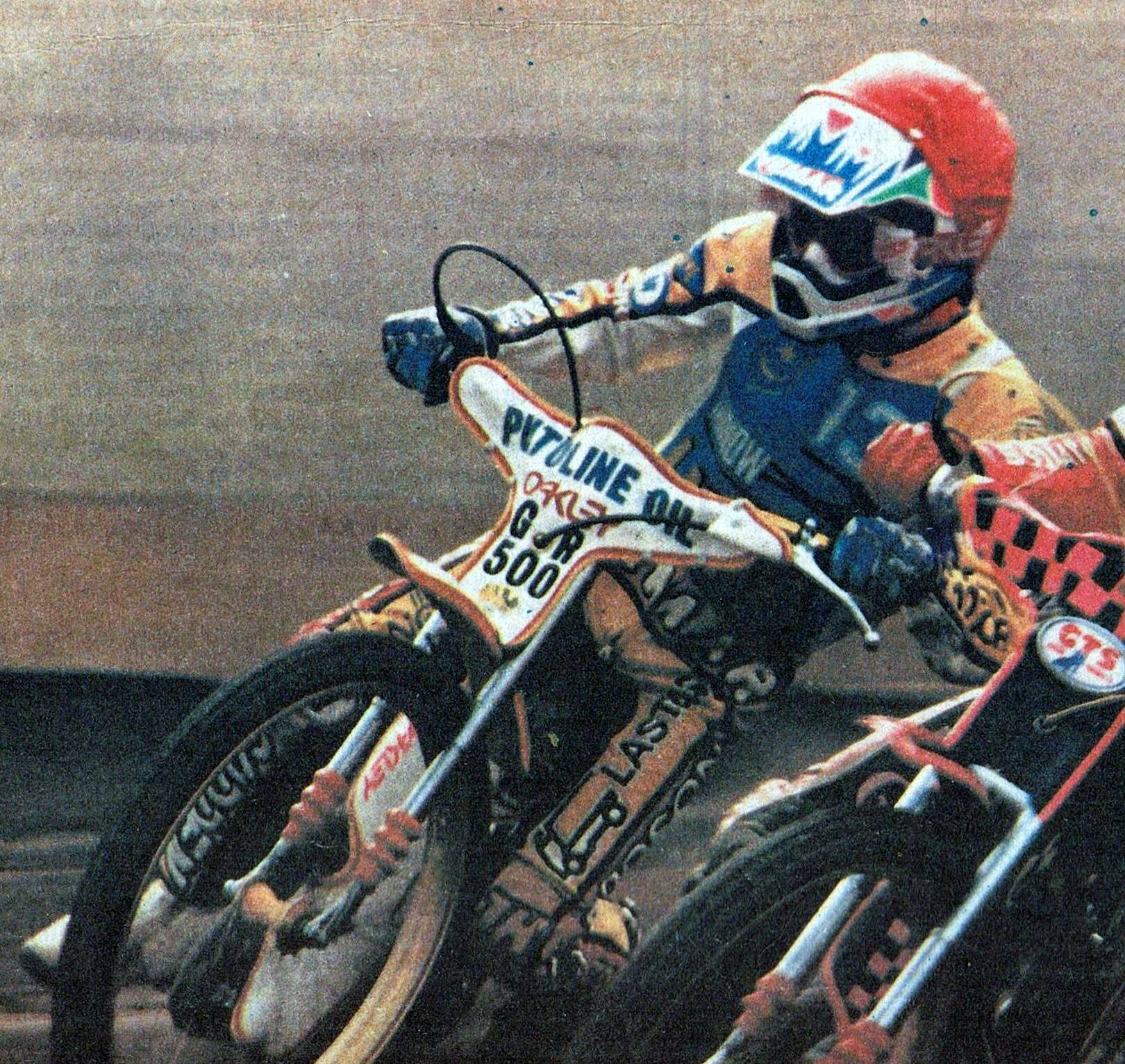
- Gert Handberg was the 1989 champion
- Venue: Santa Marina Stadium
- Location: Lonigo, Italy
- Start date: 24 August 1989

The 1989 Individual Speedway Junior World Championship was the 13th edition of the World motorcycle speedway Under-21 Championships.

The championship was won by Gert Handberg of Denmark.

== World final ==
- 14 August 1989
- (Italy) Santa Marina Stadium, Lonigo

Placing	Rider	Total	1	2	3	4	5	6	7	8	9	10	11	12	13	14	15	16	17	18	19	20	Pts	Pos	21
1	(Denmark) (4) Gert Handberg	13	3							3				1				3				3	13	1	3
2	(England) (3) Chris Louis	13	2						3				2				3				3		13	2	2
3	(Sweden) (13) Niklas Karlsson	12				3	2							2		3					2		12	3	
4	(Sweden) (1) Henrik Gustafsson	11	0				3				2				3				3				11	4	
5	(England) (10) Mark Loram	10			0			3						3			2		2				10	5	
6	(Denmark) (11) Frede Schött	9			3				1		3					F						2	9	6	
7	(Australia) (14) Leigh Adams	9				2		2					3		2							X	9	7	
8	(Denmark) (2) Claus Jacobsen	8	1					1				3				1				2			8	8	
9	(Soviet Union) (16) Rene Aas	6				1				1	1						0			3			6	9	
10	(Australia) (5) Craig Hodgson	5		3			0					t					1					1	5	10	
11	(Sweden) (6) Kenneth Lindby	5		2				E			0							2			1		5	11	
12	(Sweden) (9) Peter Karlsson	4			2		1						0					1		0			4	12	
13	(Poland) (12) Piotr Świst	3			1					2		0			0						0		3	13	
14	(Poland) (15) Jarosław Olszewski	2				0			0			1						0	1				2	14	
15	(Poland) (8) Sławomir Dudek	1		1						E			-			-			-				1	15	
16	(Italy) (7) Riccardo Salamon	0		X					-					-	-					-			0	16	
R1	(England) (R1) Dean Standing	5							2				1		1					1			5	R1	
R2	(Czechoslovakia) (R2) Jan Holub II	4										2		0		2			E				4	R2	
Placing	Rider	Total	1	2	3	4	5	6	7	8	9	10	11	12	13	14	15	16	17	18	19	20	Pts	Pos	21

m - exclusion for exceeding two minute time allowance • t - exclusion for touching the tapes • x - other exclusion • e - retired or mechanical failure • f - fell • ns - non-starter • nc - non-classify

gate A - inside	gate B	gate C	gate D - outside
