= 1986 Individual Speedway Junior European Championship =

European motorcycle speedway event

European Under-21 Championship
- Venue: Rivne Speedway Stadium
- Location: Rivne, Soviet Union
- Start date: 13 July 1986

The 1986 Individual Speedway Junior European Championship was the tenth edition of the European motorcycle speedway Under-21 Championships.

Held on 13 July in Rivne (now Ukraine), the winner was Igor Marko of the Soviet Union.

== European final ==
- 13 July 1986
- (Soviet Union) Rivne Speedway Stadium, Rivne

Placing	Rider	Total	1	2	3	4	5	6	7	8	9	10	11	12	13	14	15	16	17	18	19	20	Pts	Pos
1	(Soviet Union) (15) Igor Marko	13				1			3			3						3	3				13	1
2	(Sweden) (11) Tony Olsson	12			3				E		3					3						3	12	2
3	(Denmark) (13) Brian Karger	11				3	3							2		F					3		11	3
4	(Czechoslovakia) (9) Bohumil Brhel	10			0		2						3					2		3			10	4
5	(Denmark) (8) Jan Jakobsen	10		3						1			2			2			2				10	5
6	(Sweden) (14) Conny Ivarsson	10				2		2					1		3							2	10	6
7	(Denmark) (7) Jan Stæchmann	9		1					2					3	1					2			9	7
8	(England) (6) Andrew Silver	7		2				3			2							0			F		7	8
9	(Poland) (10) Zbigniew Błażejczak	7			2			1						1			3		F				7	9
10	(Sweden) (3) Mikael Teurnberg	7	2						1				0				2				2		7	10
11	(Australia) (16) David Cheshire	5				0				2	1						1			1			5	11
12	(England) (1) Nigel De'ath	5	1				1				0				2				1				5	12
13	(West Germany) (12) Gerd Riss	4			1					3		X			X						-		4	13
14	(Denmark) (2) Allan Johansen	3	3					X				-				-				-			3	14
15	(Hungary) (4) Robert Nagy	2	0							0				0				1				1	2	15
16	(Soviet Union) (5) Igor Shvets	1		0			0					1					0					0	1	16
17	(Czechoslovakia) (17) Jan Holub II	3										2				1				0			3	17
18	(Czechoslovakia) (18) Jan Fejfar	1																			1		1	18
Placing	Rider	Total	1	2	3	4	5	6	7	8	9	10	11	12	13	14	15	16	17	18	19	20	Pts	Pos

m - exclusion for exceeding two minute time allowance • t - exclusion for touching the tapes • x - other exclusion • e - retired or mechanical failure • f - fell • ns - non-starter • nc - non-classify

gate A - inside	gate B	gate C	gate D - outside
