= Start Gniezno Stadium =

Stadium in Gniezno, Poland

- Location: Wrzesińska 25, 62-200 Gniezno, Poland
- Coordinates: 52°31′18″N 17°35′53″E
- Capacity: 9,662
- Opened: 1929
- Length: 0.3445 km

The Start Gniezno Stadium also known as the Colonel Franciszek Hynek Municipal Stadium is a 9,662-capacity motorcycle speedway stadium in the south of Gniezno in Poland.

The venue is used by the speedway team Start Gniezno, who compete in the Team Speedway Polish Championship.

== History ==
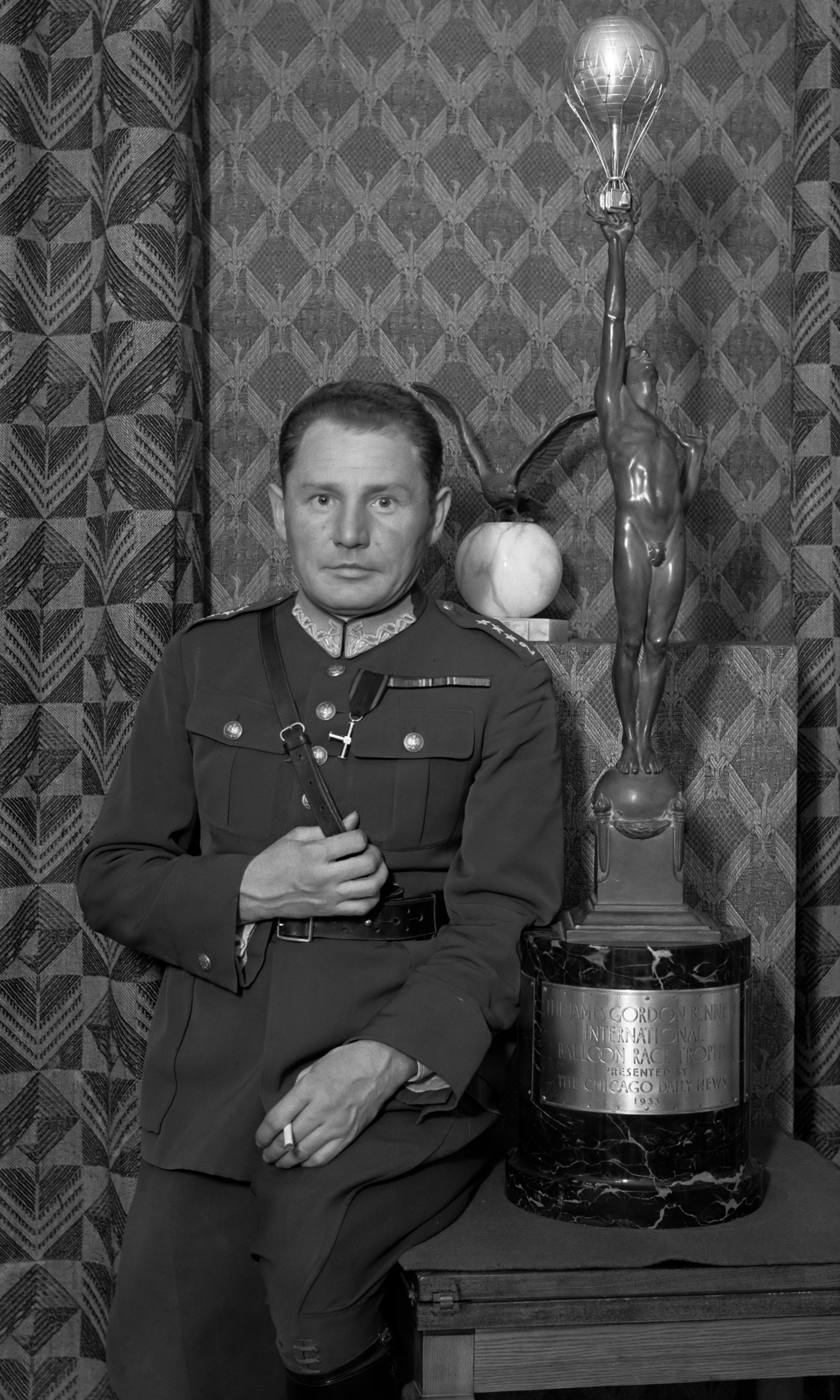
Colonel Franciszek Hynek

The stadium opened in 1929, when the first stand was built. Major speedway events began in 1963 with an international match between the Poland national speedway team against the Soviet Union and Czechoslovakia national speedway teams.

The stadium is also known as the Colonel Franciszek Hynek Municipal Stadium, named after the aviation pioneer and World War II commander.

In 2011, the track hosted the fourth and final round of the 2011 Speedway Under-21 World Championship.

On 4 April 2022, the track record was broken by Peter Kildemand in a time of 63.50 seconds.
