= Anton Rosén =

Swedish motorcycle speedway rider (born 1991)

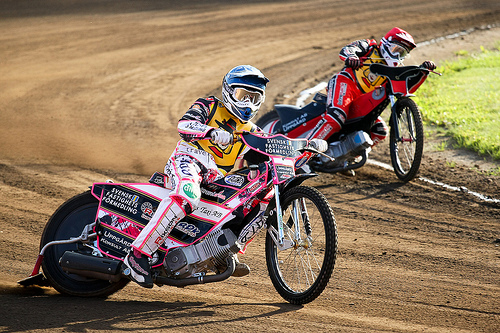
- Rosén in blue helmet closest to the camera.
- Born: 21 August 1991 (age 35)
- Nationality: Swedish

Career history

Sweden
- 2009: Västervik
- 2009–2015: Masarna
- 2010: Rospiggarna
- 2012–2014, 2016: Piraterna
- 2016: Valsarna

Great Britain
- 2013–2015: Newcastle

Poland
- 2010–2014: Rawicz

Denmark
- 2012: Slangerup

Anton Rosén (born 21 August 1991) is a former motorcycle speedway rider from Sweden.

== Career ==
In 2009, Rosén qualified for the 2009 Individual U-19 European Championship Final. Three days before the Final, he was injured in the Elitserien match between Västervik and Vargarna.

In 2013, Rosén joined the Newcastle Diamonds for the 2013 Premier League speedway season and impressed scoring a 8.35 league average. He stayed with Newcastle for three seasons, but his 2015 season was marred by a crash that broke his collarbone.

Rosén retired from speedway after the 2016 season.

== Results ==
=== European Championships ===
- Individual U-19 European Championship
  - 2009 - (Poland) Tarnów - injury before the Final and was replaced
  - 2010 - 13th placed in the Semi-Final Three
- Team U-19 European Championship
  - 2009 - (Denmark) Holsted - Runner-up (6 pts)
  - 2010 - (Czech Republic) Divišov - Runner-up (12 pts)
