= Jan Holub III =

Czech speedway rider (born 1991)

- Born: 7 August 1991 (age 35); Czechoslovakia
- Nationality: Czech

Career history

Czech Republic
- 2007: Markéta Praha

Poland
- 2009-2010: Opole

Jan Holub (born 7 August 1991) is a Czech motorcycle speedway rider. He rode for Kolejarz Opole during the Polish Second League.

== Personal life ==
Holub comes from a three-generation speedway family; his grandfather (Jan I) and father (Jan II) were also speedway riders with high records. Jan I finished sixth in the 1972 Speedway World Pairs Championship, and Jan II participated in 1986 and 1989 Under-21 World Championship.

== Career details ==
=== World championships ===
- Individual U-21 World Championship (Under-21 World Championship)
  - 2009 - 17th placed in the semi-final one as a track reserve
  - 2010 - qualify to the semi-final one as a track reserve
- Team Under-21 World Championship (Under-21 Speedway World Cup)
  - 2009 - (Poland) Gorzów Wielkopolski - 4th placed (1 pt)
  - 2010 - 3rd placed in the qualifying round one

=== European championships ===
- Individual Under-19 European Championship
  - 2008 - 9th placed in the semi-final one
  - 2009 - 8th placed in the semi-final one
  - 2010 - (Croatia) Goričan - 12th placed (4 pts)
- Team Under-19 European Championship
  - 2009 - (Denmark) Holsted - 4th placed (2 pts)
  - 2010 - (Czech Republic) Divišov - 3rd placed (7 pts)

=== Domestic competitions ===
Team Polish Championship (Polish league)
Season	Club	League	Placed	Matches	Heats	Points	Bonus	Average
2007	Prague (CZE)	II	7th	4	13	2	0	0.154
2009	Opole	II	5th	2	6	4	0	0.667
2010	Opole	II						

Note: II - Second League (third and last division)

== See also ==
- Czech Republic national under-21 speedway team (U19)
