= Michal Dudek =

Czech speedway rider (born 1990)

- Born: September 20, 1990 (age 36)
- Nationality: Czech Republic

Current club information
- Czech league: AK Slaný

Career history
- 2013-17: AK Slaný (Czech Republic)

Michal Dudek (born 20 September 1990) is a Czech motorcycle speedway rider and member of the Czech junior national team.

== Career details ==
=== World Championships ===
- Individual U-21 World Championship
  - 2008 - 16th place in the Qualifying Round 3
  - 2009 - 15th place in the Qualifying Round 4
- Team U-21 World Championship (U-21 Speedway World Cup)
  - 2009 - (Poland) Gorzów Wlkp. - the Final will be on 5 September (started in the Semi-Final)

=== European Championships ===
- Individual U-19 European Championship
  - 2008 - 13th place in the Semi-Final 1
  - 2009 - (Poland) Tarnów - 16th place (0 pts)
- Team U-19 European Championship
  - 2008 - 4th place in the Semi-Final 2
  - 2009 - (Denmark) Holsted - 4th place (2 pts)

== See also ==
- Czech Republic national speedway team

== World Longtrack Championship ==
Qualifying Round

- 2015 (13th) 4pts
- 2017 (20th) 5pts

Team Championship

- 2015 (Germany) Mühldorf (6th) 3/30pts (Rode with Richard Wolff, Josef Franc, Michal Skurla).
- 2017 (Netherlands) Roden (4th) 0/43pts (Rode with Hynek Stichauer, Josef Franc).

== European Grasstrack Championship ==
Semi-final

- 2017 (16th) 7pts
- 2018 (18th) 1pt
