= Oskar Fajfer =

Polish speedway rider

- Born: 30 April 1994 (age 32); Gniezno, Poland
- Nationality: Polish

Career history

Poland
- 2010–2012, 2013, 2019–2022: Gniezno
- 2013: Grudziądz
- 2014–2015: Toruń
- 2016–2018: Gdańsk
- 2023–2025: Gorzów

Sweden
- 2019: Masarna
- 2021–2025: Piraterna

Denmark
- 2022: Region Varde

Speedway Grand Prix statistics
- Starts: 1
- Finalist: 0 times
- Winner: 0 times

Oskar Fajfer (born 30 April 1994) is a motorcycle speedway rider from Poland.

== Speedway career ==
Fajfer first started racing for his home club of Start Gniezno in 2010. He finished 12th in the 2011 Speedway Under-21 World Championship. After spells with Grudziądz, Toruń and Gdańsk, he returned to Gniezno for the 2019 season.

Fajfer also rides in the Swedish and Danish leagues. In 2024, he rode for Piraterna.

== Major results ==
=== World individual Championship ===
- 2024 Speedway Grand Prix - 22nd
