= 2009 Individual Speedway Junior European Championship =

Motorcycle racing competition

The 2009 European Individual Speedway Junior Championship will be the 12th UEM Individual Speedway Junior European Championship season. The Final was held on 11 July 2009 in Tarnów, Poland; it will be fourth Final in Poland, but first time in Tarnów. Defending European Champion is Artur Mroczka from Poland who won in 2008 Final in Stralsund, Germany.

== Calendar ==
Race format
Gate	A (inside)	B	C	D (outside)
Heat No	Riders starting No
1	1	2	3	4
2	5	7	6	8
3	10	11	9	12
4	15	14	16	13
5	13	1	5	9
6	14	10	2	6
7	11	15	7	3
8	4	8	12	16
9	6	16	1	11
10	12	5	15	2
11	8	9	3	14
12	13	4	10	7
13	7	12	14	1
14	2	13	8	11
15	16	3	10	5
16	9	6	4	15
17	1	8	15	10
18	9	2	7	16
19	3	12	13	6
20	5	14	11	4

Day	Venue	Winner	
Qualifying Round
4 April	(Germany) Teterow	(Germany) René Deddens	result
Semi-Finals
1 May	(Hungary) Debrecen	(Slovakia) Martin Vaculík	result
16 May	(Sweden) Hallstavik	(Sweden) Linus Sundström	result
13 June	(Slovenia) Lendava	(Russia) Artem Laguta	result
Final
11 July	(Poland) Tarnów	(Poland) Przemysław Pawlicki	result

== Domestic Qualifications ==
=== Poland ===
The Final of Domestic Qualification to Individual Junior European Championship (Polish: Finał krajowych eliminacji do Indywidualnych Mistrzostw Europy Juniorów) was canceled. Main Commission of Speedway Sport (part of Polish Motor Union) nominated seven riders and one reserve:

- Przemysław Pawlicki (Leszno)
- Sławomir Musielak (Leszno)
- Dawid Lampart (Rzeszów)
- Patryk Dudek (Zielona Góra)
- Maciej Janowski (Wrocław)
- Kacper Gomólski (Gniezno)
- Damian Sperz (Gdańsk)
- Reserve: Marcel Kajzer (Gniezno)

== Qualifying round ==
=== Teterow ===
- Qualifying Round
- 4 April 2009 (15:15)
- (Germany) Teterow, Arena am Kellerholz
- Referee: Susanne Huttinger
- Qualify: 4 + 2R to SF1 and 4 + 2R to SF3
- Change:
  - (10) (Austria) Daniel Gappmaier → Kajzer
  - (11) (Hungary) Attila Lorincz → None
  - (12) (France) Maxime Mazeau → None

Pos.	Rider	Points	Details
1	(Germany) (2) René Deddens	14	(3,3,3,3,2)
2	(Poland) (7) Sławomir Musielak	13	(3,3,3,3,1)
3	(Germany) (5) Erik Pudel	13	(2,3,2,3,3)
4	(Poland) (16) Damian Sperz	12	(1,3,3,2,3)
5	(Czech Republic) (15) Michal Dudek	11	(3,2,1,3,2)
6	(Poland) (10) Marcel Kajzer	10	(3,2,2,0,3)
7	(Germany) (3) Sebastian Eckerle	8	(2,1,1,1,3)
8	(Austria) (14) Lukas Simon	8	(2,1,2,2,1)
9	(Ukraine) (9) Kiril Tcukanov	7+3	(X,2,3,2,0)
10	(Ukraine) (4) Stanislav Ogorodnyk	7+2	(1,2,1,1,2)
11	(Slovenia) (1) Aljosa Remith	4+3	(F,0,2,1,1)
12	(France) (8) Theo di Palma	4+2	(1,1,0,2,0)
13	(Netherlands) (13) Jeffrey Woortmann	4+1	(0,1,0,1,2)
14	(Belgium) (6) Wim Kennis	2	(0,0,1,0,1)

== Semi-finals ==
=== Debrecen ===
- Semi-Final 1
- 1 May 2009 (15:00)
- (Hungary) Debrecen, Speedway Stadium (Length: 392 m)
- Referee: Marek Wojaczek
- Qualify: 5 + 1R
- Change:
  - (5) (United Kingdom) John Resch → Pickard
  - (6) (Russia) Alexander Marinyk → Reserve 17
  - (8) (Austria) Lukas Simon → Reserve 18 (France) Theo di Palma → None
  - (17) Reserve → (Netherlands) Jeffrey Woortmann → None
  - (18) Reserve → None

Pos.	Rider	Points	Details
1	(Slovakia) (10) Martin Vaculík	15	(3,3,3,3,3)
2	(Poland) (14) Przemysław Pawlicki	13	(3,2,3,2,3)
3	(Poland) (7) Maciej Janowski	11+3	(2,3,E,3,3)
4	(Czech Republic) (9) Michal Dudek	11+2	(2,3,2,3,1)
5	(Latvia) (13) Jevgēņijs Karavackis	10	(M,2,2,3,3)
6	(Germany) (15) René Deddens	9	(2,2,3,2,E)
7	(Ukraine) (6) Kiril Tcukanov	8	(3,F,3,1,1)
8	(Czech Republic) (12) Jan Holub III	7	(0,3,2,E,2)
9	(Poland) (2) Damian Sperz	7	(3,E,F,2,2)
10	(Hungary) (1) Attila Lőrincz	7	(2,1,1,1,2)
11	(United Kingdom) (4) Brendan Johnson	6	(1,2,1,0,2)
12	(Russia) (11) Mikhail Kremer	4	(1,1,2,Fx,N)
13	(United Kingdom) (5) Jaemie Pickard	4	(1,0,1,1,1)
14	(Czech Republic) (3) Pavol Pucko	3	(0,E,1,2,0)
15	(Hungary) (16) Róbert Szegvári	0	(T,X,0,0,0)

=== Hallstavik ===
- Semi-Final 2
- 16 May 2009 (15:00)
- (Sweden) Hallstavik, Orionparken Stadium (Length: 289 m)
- Referee: Istvan Daragó
- Qualify: 5 + 1R

Pos.	Rider	Points	Details
1	(Sweden) (2) Linus Sundström	14	(2,3,3,3,3)
2	(Sweden) (16) Dennis Andersson	13	(2,3,3,3,2)
3	(Sweden) (1) Kim Nilsson	12	(3,3,2,1,3)
4	(Denmark) (4) René Bach	10	(1,0,3,3,3)
5	(Sweden) (12) Anton Rosén	10	(3,1,F,3,3)
6	(Finland) (14) Kalle Katajisto	9	(1,1,3,2,2)
7	(Sweden) (13) Ludvig Lindgren	8	(3,F,1,2,2)
8	(Sweden) (10) Anders Mellgren	7	(2,2,0,2,1)
9	(Sweden) (17) Christian Ago	6	(2,2,2,0,0)
10	(Denmark) (5) Patrick Bjerregaard	6	(1,2,2,0,1)
11	(Finland) (15) Niko Siltaniemi	6	(0,1,1,2,2)
12	(Denmark) (11) Jeppe Schmidt	5	(1,2,1,1,0)
13	(Finland) (3) Aki-Pekka Mustonen	4	(0,0,2,1,1)
14	(Norway) (9) Lars Daniel Gunnestad	4	(0,1,1,1,1)
15	(Denmark) (6) Michael Vissing	3	(3,0,0,X,0)
16	(Sweden) (18) Jonas Andersson	3	(3,e,T/-,-,0)
17	(Denmark) (7) Peter Juul Larsen	0	(T/-,-,-,-,-)
18	(Denmark) (8) Simon Nielsen	0	(X,-,-,-,-)

=== Lendava ===
- Semi-Final 3
- 13 June 2009 (18:45)
- (Slovenia) Lendava, Petišovci Stadium (Length: 398 m)
- Referee: Anthony Steele
- Qualify: 5
- Change:
  - (1) German rider → Slovenian rider
  - (17) (Ukraine) Stanislav Ogorodnyk → second track reserve

Pos.	Rider	Points	Details
1	(Russia) (5) Artem Laguta	14	(3,3,3,3,2)
2	(Poland) (7) Dawid Lampart	13+3	(2,3,3,3,2)
3	(Poland) (16) Patryk Dudek	13+2	(2,3,3,2,3)
4	(Poland) (15) Sławomir Musielak	12	(3,2,1,3,3)
5	(Slovenia) (11) Aleksander Čonda	11	(3,1,2,2,3)
6	(Czech Republic) (14) Michael Hádek	10	(1,3,3,2,1)
7	(Poland) (2) Kacper Gomólski	8	(3,1,0,3,1)
8	(Germany) (6) Erik Pudel	8	(1,2,F,2,3)
9	(Germany) (4) Marcel Helfer	6	(2,2,1,1,0)
10	(Poland) (12) Marcel Kajzer	6	(E,1,2,1,2)
11	(Slovenia) (17) Aljosa Remith	5	(0,0,2,1,2)
12	(Russia) (9) Jewgienij Szczepin	4	(2,2,0,0,0)
13	(Croatia) (3) Nikola Pigac	3	(0,F,2,0,1)
14	(Slovenia) (1) Dalibor Bot	3	(1,1,1,0,0)
15	(Germany) (8) Sebastian Eckerle	3	(0,T/-,1,1,1)
16	(Slovenia) (13) Ladislav Vida	0	(0,0,E,-,E)
17	(Croatia) (10) Kreso Petkovic	0	(E,-,-,-,-)

== Final ==
Riding number jacket

- The Final
- 11 July 2009 (19:15 UTC+2)
- (Poland) Tarnów, Stadion Miejski (Length: 392 m)
- Referee: Istvan Darago
- Jury President: (Denmark) B. Thomsen
- Attendance: 2,000

=== Riders ===
#	Riders	Nationality	2008 place
9	Maciej Janowski	Poland	2
5	Artem Laguta	Russia	5
6	Dennis Andersson	Sweden	7
10	Kim Nilsson	Sweden	9
7	Dawid Lampart	Poland	11
14	Michael Hádek	Czech Republic	12
2	Linus Sundström	Sweden	SF
1	Aleksander Čonda	Slovenia	SF
11	Michal Dudek	Czech Republic	SF
3	René Bach	Denmark	SF
16	Patryk Dudek	Poland	—
8	Jevgēņijs Karavackis	Latvia	—
15	Sławomir Musielak	Poland	—
12	Przemysław Pawlicki	Poland	—
13	Anton Rosén	Sweden	—
4	Martin Vaculík	Slovakia	—
17	René Deddens	Germany	—
18	Kalle Katajisto	Finland	SF

=== Heat details ===
Placing	Rider	Total	1	2	3	4	5	6	7	8	9	10	11	12	13	14	15	16	17	18	19	20	Pts	Pos	21
1	(Poland) (12) Przemysław Pawlicki	14			3					2		3			3						3		14	1	
2	(Poland) (9) Maciej Janowski	13			2		2						3					3		3			13	3	3
3	(Slovakia) (4) Martin Vaculík	13	3							3				3				2				2	13	4	2
4	(Russia) (5) Artem Laguta	13		3			3					2					2					3	13	2	1
5	(Poland) (16) Patryk Dudek	10				2				1	3						3			1			10	5	
6	(Poland) (15) Sławomir Musielak	9				3			3			1						0	2				9	6	
7	(Sweden) (6) Dennis Andersson	8		X				3			2							1			2		8	7	
8	(Sweden) (2) Linus Sundström	7	2					0				0				3				2			7	8	
9	(Poland) (7) Dawid Lampart	7		2					2					1	2					0			7	9	
10	(Latvia) (8) Jevgēņijs Karavackis	6		1						0			0			2			3				6	10	
11	(Czech Republic) (14) Michael Hádek	5				0		2					2		0							1	5	11	
12	(Finland) (13) Kalle Katajisto	5				1	0							2		1					1		5	12	
13	(Slovenia) (1) Aleksander Čonda	5	1				1				1				1				1				5	13	
14	(Sweden) (10) Kim Nilsson	3			1			1						0			1		0				3	14	
15	(Denmark) (3) René Bach	2	0						1				1				e				-		2	15	
16	(Czech Republic) (11) Michal Dudek	0			0				0		0					0						0	0	16	
17	(Germany) (17) René Deddens	0																			0		0	17	
	(Poland) (18) Kacper Gomólski	0																					0		
Placing	Rider	Total	1	2	3	4	5	6	7	8	9	10	11	12	13	14	15	16	17	18	19	20	Pts	Pos	21

m - exclusion for exceeding two minute time allowance • t - exclusion for touching the tapes • x - other exclusion • e - retired or mechanical failure • f - fell • ns - non-starter • nc - non-classify

gate A - inside	gate B	gate C	gate D - outside

== See also ==
- 2009 Team Speedway Junior European Championship
