= Aleksander Čonda =

Slovenian speedway rider

- Born: August 26, 1990 (age 35)
- Nationality: Slovenian

Career history
- 2009, 2011: Krosno
- 2010: Miskolc

Aleksander Čonda (born 26 August 1990) is a Slovenian former motorcycle speedway rider.

== Career ==
Čonda was a member of the Slovenian national team at 2009 Speedway World Cup. He medalled six times at the Slovenian Individual Speedway Championship. Although he won three silver medals and three bronze medals, he never became champion of Slovenia, being denied the gold medal three times by Matej Žagar.

During the 2009 Polish second division and 2011 Polish second division seasons, Čonda rode for KSM Krosno in the 2 liga. In between (2010) he rode for Hungarian side Miskolc in the 1 Liga.

Čonda announced his retirement from speedway in 2016.

== Results ==
=== World Championships ===
- Team World Championship (Speedway World Team Cup and Speedway World Cup)
  - 2009 - the Event 2 will be on 13 July
- Individual U-21 World Championship
  - 2008 - 11th place in the Qualifying Round 2
  - 2009 - 14th place in the Semi-Final 1
- Team U-21 World Championship (Under-21 World Cup)
  - 2008 - 4th place in the Qualifying Round 2
  - 2010 - 4th place in the Qualifying Round Two

=== European Championships ===
- Individual European Championship
  - 2009 - qualify to the Semi-Final 1, but was replaced
- Individual U-19 European Championship
  - 2008 - 11th place in the Semi-Final 3
  - 2009 - (Poland) Tarnów - 13th place (5 pts)

== See also ==
- Slovenia national speedway team
