= Michael Hádek =

Czech speedway rider

- Born: 8 May 1990 (age 36)
- Nationality: Czech Republic

Current club information
- Czech league: PK Pilzno
- Polish league: KSM Krosno

Career history
- 2007: Prague (CZE)
- 2008–2009: Krosno (POL)

Individual honours
- 2007: Czech Extraliga Champion

Michael Hádek (born 8 May 1990) is a Czech motorcycle speedway rider who is a member of the Czech junior national team. He is grandson of the speedway rider Jan Hádek.

== Speedway career details ==
=== World championships ===
- Individual U-21 World Championship
  - 2008 – 9th place in the qualifying round 5
  - 2009 – 13th place in the qualifying round 1
  - 2010 – 9th place in the qualifying round 1
- Team U-21 World Championship (U-21 Speedway World Cup)
  - 2008 – 2nd place in the qualifying round 1
  - 2009 – (Poland) Gorzów Wlkp. – did not start in the final (in qualifying round only)
  - 2010 – 3rd place in the qualifying round One

=== European championships ===
- Individual European Championship
  - 2008 – 15th place in the semi-final 3
- Individual U-19 European Championship
  - 2008 – (Germany) Stralsund – 12th place (5 pts)
  - 2009 – (Poland) Tarnów – 11th place (5 pts)
- Team U-19 European Championship
  - 2008 – 4th place in the semi-final 2
  - 2009 – (Denmark) Holsted – 4th place (9 pts)

=== Domestic competitions ===
- Team Polish Championship (League)
  - 2007 – 7th place in Second League for Prague (average 1.389)
  - 2008 – 6th place in Second League for Krosno (average 1.050)
  - 2009 – for Krosno
- Team Czech Championship (Extraliga)
  - 2007 – Czech Champion

== World Longtrack Championship ==
=== Grand-Prix ===
- 2010 1 app (28th) 2pts
