= 2011 Individual Speedway Latvian Championship =

Latvian racing event

The 2011 Latvian Individual Speedway Championship was the 37th Latvian Individual Speedway Championship season. The final took place in Rosja, Latvia.

== Results ==
- August 21, 2011
- LVA Daugavpils

| Placing | Rider | Total | 1 | 2 | 3 | 4 | 5 | 6 | 7 | 8 | 9 | 10 | 11 | 12 | 13 | 14 | 15 | 16 | 17 | 18 | 19 | 20 | Pts | Pos | 21 | 22 |
|---|---|---|---|---|---|---|---|---|---|---|---|---|---|---|---|---|---|---|---|---|---|---|---|---|---|---|
| 1 | (Russia) (11) Grigory Laguta | 15 | | | 3 | | | | 3 | | 3 | | | | | 3 | | | | | | 3 | 15 | 1 | | |
| 2 | (Latvia) (5) Maksims Bogdanovs | 12 | | 3 | | | 2 | | | | | 3 | | | | | 3 | | | | | 1 | 12 | 2 | | |
| 3 | (Latvia) (14) Kjasts Puodžuks | 11 | | | | 3 | | 3 | | | | | 2 | | 1 | | | | | | | 2 | 11 | 3 | | |
| 4 | (Latvia) (9) Andzhej Lebedev | 10 | | | 0 | | 3 | | | | | | 3 | | | | | 3 | | 1 | | | 10 | 4 | | |
| 5 | (Ukraine) (4) Andrey Karpov | 10 | 2 | | | | | | | 3 | | | | 3 | | | | 2 | | | | 0 | 10 | 5 | | |
| 6 | (Poland) (16) Robert Miśkowiak | 9 | | | | 2 | | | | 2 | 0 | | | | | | 2 | | | 3 | | | 9 | 6 | | |
| 7 | (Russia) (12) Daniil Ivanov | 9 | | | 2 | | | | | 0 | | 2 | | | 2 | | | | | | 3 | | 9 | 7 | | |
| 8 | (Finland) (10) Timo Lahti | 7 | | | 1 | | | 2 | | | | | | 0 | | | 1 | | 3 | | | | 7 | 8 | | |
| 9 | (Ukraine) (7) Aleksandr Loktaev | 7 | | E | | | | | 1 | | | | | 1 | 3 | | | | | 2 | | | 7 | 9 | | |
| 10 | (Latvia) (1) Yevgeny Karavacky | 6 | 3 | | | | F | | | | 1 | | | | 0 | | | | 2 | | | | 6 | 10 | | |
| 11 | (Latvia) (3) Vyacheslav Girucky | 6 | 1 | | | | | | 2 | | | | 1 | | | | 0 | | | | 2 | | 6 | 11 | | |
| 12 | (Latvia) (13) Andrejs Koroļevs | 6 | | | | 1 | 1 | | | | | | | 2 | | 1 | | | | | 1 | | 6 | 12 | | |
| 13 | (Poland) (6) Ronnie Jamroży | 5 | | 2 | | | | 0 | | | 2 | | | | | | | 1 | | | 0 | | 5 | 13 | | |
| 14 | (Russia) (2) Vadim Tarasenko | 4 | 0 | | | | | 1 | | | | 1 | | | | 2 | | | | E | | | 4 | 14 | | |
| 15 | (Latvia) (8) Ivan Pleshakov | 2 | | 1 | | | | | | 1 | | | 0 | | | 0 | | | 0 | | | | 2 | 15 | | |
| 16 | (Finland) (15) Teemu Lahti | 1 | | | | 0 | | | 0 | | | 0 | | | | | | 0 | 1 | | | | 1 | 16 | | |
| Placing | Rider | Total | 1 | 2 | 3 | 4 | 5 | 6 | 7 | 8 | 9 | 10 | 11 | 12 | 13 | 14 | 15 | 16 | 17 | 18 | 19 | 20 | Pts | Pos | 21 | 22 |

m - exclusion for exceeding two minute time allowance • t - exclusion for touching the tapes • x - other exclusion • e - retired or mechanical failure • f - fell • ns - non-starter • nc - non-classify

| gate A - inside | gate B | gate C | gate D - outside |
