= 2001 Individual Speedway Latvian Championship =

The 2001 Latvian Individual Speedway Championship was the 27th Latvian Individual Speedway Championship season. The final took place in Daugavpils, Latvia.

== Results ==
- June 28, 2001
- LVA Daugavpils

Placing	Rider	Total	1	2	3	4	5	6	7	8	9	10	11	12	13	14	15	16	17	18	19	20	Pts	Pos	21	22
1	(Latvia) (4) Andrejs Koroļevs	15	3							3				3				3				3	15	1		
2	(Poland) (3) Piotr Markuszewski	12	2						3				3				1				3		12	2	3	
3	(Latvia) (5) Nikolay Kokin	12		2			3					2					3					2	12	3	2	
4	(Latvia) (2) Vladimir Voronkov	11	1					2				3				3				2			11	4		
5	(Sweden) (14) Mikael Teunberg	10				3		3					1		2							1	10	5		
6	(Poland) (16) Robert Kempinski	10				2				2	3						2			1			10	6		
7	(Poland) (9) Wojciech Żurawski	9			0		2						2					2		3			9	7		
8	(Sweden) (12) Robert Ljungholm	8			2					1		1			3						1		8	8		
9	(Latvia) (10) Leonid Paura	7			3			0						2			0		2				7	9		
10	(Poland) (6) Wieslaw Oskiewicz	7		3				1			2							1			E		7	10		
11	(Latvia) (13) Denis Popovich	5				0	0							1		2					2		5	11		
12	(Latvia) (15) Stanislav Paura	4				1			E			0						E	3				4	12		
13	(Ukraine) (11) Igor Marko	4			1				2		1					E						-	4	13		
14	(Finland) (7) Yuri Palomäki	3		1					1					0	1					E			3	14		
15	(Finland) (1) Toni Salmela	2	0				1				0				0				1				2	15		
16	(Latvia) (8) Aleksandr Ivanov	0		F						F			-			-			-				0	16		
R1	(Latvia) (R1) Vitaly Biznya	1														1						F	1	R1		
R2	(Latvia) (R2) Kjasts Puodžuks	0											0						0				0	R2		
Placing	Rider	Total	1	2	3	4	5	6	7	8	9	10	11	12	13	14	15	16	17	18	19	20	Pts	Pos	21	22

m - exclusion for exceeding two minute time allowance • t - exclusion for touching the tapes • x - other exclusion • e - retired or mechanical failure • f - fell • ns - non-starter • nc - non-classify

gate A - inside	gate B	gate C	gate D - outside
