= 2008 Individual Speedway Latvian Championship =

The 2008 Latvian Individual Speedway Championship was the 34th Latvian Individual Speedway Championship season. The final took place in Rosja, Latvia.

== Results ==
- July 13, 2008
- LVA Daugavpils

Placing	Rider	Total	1	2	3	4	5	6	7	8	9	10	11	12	13	14	15	16	17	18	19	20	Pts	Pos	21	22
1	(Russia) (1) Grigory Laguta	14	3				3				2				3				3				14	1	3	
2	(Poland) (16) Piotr Świst	13				2				2	3						3			3			13	2	1	
3	(Latvia) (5) Maksims Bogdanovs	11		2			1					3					2					3	11	3	2	
4	(Latvia) (13) Leonid Paura	11				3	F							2		3					3		11	4	0	
5	(Poland) (4) Tomasz Piszcz	10	2							3				1				2				2	10	5		
6	(Latvia) (8) Vyacheslav Girucky	9		1						1			3			2			2				9	6		
7	(Russia) (10) Sergey Darkin	9			2			3						3			1		0				9	7		
8	(Poland) (15) Zbigniew Czerwiński	8				1			1			2						3	1				8	8		
9	(Poland) (9) Paweł Miesiąc	8			3		2						1					1		1			8	9		
10	(Latvia) (7) Andrejs Koroļevs	7		3					0					E	2					2			7	10		
11	(Latvia) (3) Yevgeny Karavacky	6	0						3				2				0				1		6	11		
12	(Russia) (2) Ilya Bondarenko	5	1					2				1				1				0			5	12		
13	(Russia) (11) Vladimir Dubinin	3			T				2		0					0						1	3	13		
14	(Russia) (6) Ruslan Gatiyatov	3		0				0			1							0			2		3	14		
15	(Russia) (14) Semyon Vlasov	2				0		1					0		1							0	2	15		
16	(Latvia) (12) Yevgeny Petukhov	1			1					0		0			0						0		1	16		
R1	(Latvia) (R1) Maris Kursitis	0			0																		0	R1		
Placing	Rider	Total	1	2	3	4	5	6	7	8	9	10	11	12	13	14	15	16	17	18	19	20	Pts	Pos	21	22

m - exclusion for exceeding two minute time allowance • t - exclusion for touching the tapes • x - other exclusion • e - retired or mechanical failure • f - fell • ns - non-starter • nc - non-classify

gate A - inside	gate B	gate C	gate D - outside
