= 2010 Individual Speedway Latvian Championship =

The 2010 Latvian Individual Speedway Championship was the 36th Latvian Individual Speedway Championship season. The final took place in Rosja, Latvia.

== Results ==
- September 12, 2010
- LVA Daugavpils

Placing	Rider	Total	1	2	3	4	5	6	7	8	9	10	11	12	13	14	15	16	17	18	19	20	Pts	Pos	21	22
1	(Russia) (11) Grigory Laguta	15			3				3		3					3						3	15	1		
2	(Latvia) (4) Kjasts Puodžuks	12	2							3				3				3				1	12	2	3	
3	(Russia) (14) Artem Laguta	12				3		3					3		3							0	12	3	2	
4	(Poland) (5) Krzysztof Jabłoński	11		3			0					3					3					2	11	4		
5	(Latvia) (13) Andrejs Koroļevs	10				2	3							1		1					3		10	5		
6	(Poland) (3) Paweł Miesiąc	10	3						2				1				2				2		10	6		
7	(Latvia) (10) Andžejs Ļebedevs	8			2			2						2			F		2				8	7		
8	(Latvia) (1) Leonid Paura	7	T				2				1				1				3				7	8		
9	(Poland) (15) Piotr Świst	7				1			1			2						2	1				7	9		
10	(Russia) (2) Vadim Tarasenko	6	1					1				1				2				1			6	10		
11	(Latvia) (9) Yevgeny Karavacky	5			X		1						0					1		3			5	11		
12	(Latvia) (6) Vjačeslavs Giruckis	5		2				0			2							X			1		5	12		
13	(Ukraine) (16) Aleksandr Boroday	5				0				2	0						1			2			5	13		
14	(Ukraine) (8) Yaroslav Polyukhovich	4		1						1			2			E			0				4	14		
15	(Poland) (7) Piotr Rembas	2		E					0					0	2					0			2	15		
16	(Latvia) (12) Igor Antonenko	0			T					0		0			E						-		0	16		
R1	(Latvia) (R1) Ivan Pleshakov	0	E																		0		0	R1		
Placing	Rider	Total	1	2	3	4	5	6	7	8	9	10	11	12	13	14	15	16	17	18	19	20	Pts	Pos	21	22

m - exclusion for exceeding two minute time allowance • t - exclusion for touching the tapes • x - other exclusion • e - retired or mechanical failure • f - fell • ns - non-starter • nc - non-classify

gate A - inside	gate B	gate C	gate D - outside
