= 2014 Speedway European Championship =

Motorcycle racing competition

Season details
- Dates: 6 July – 19 September
- Events: 4
- Cities: 4
- Countries: 4
- Riders: 15 permanents 1 wild card(s); 2 track reserves
- Heats: (in 4 events)

Winners
- Champion: RUS Emil Sayfutdinov
- Runner-up: DEN Peter Kildemand
- 3rd place: DEN Nicki Pedersen

The 2014 Speedway European Championship season was the second season of the Speedway European Championship (SEC) era, and decided the 14th UEM Individual Speedway European Championship. It was the second series under the promotion of One Sport Lts. of Poland.

The championship was won by Russia's Emil Sayfutdinov, six points ahead of Danish rider Peter Kildemand. Third place went to another Danish rider, Nicki Pedersen, who was another four points behind Kildemand. Pedersen had won the opening two races of the season, before Sayfutdinov moved ahead in the standings after a win at Holsted in Denmark. A fourth-place finish in Częstochowa – an event won by Russian Grigory Laguta – was enough to give Sayfutdinov the title.

== Qualification ==
For the 2014 season, 15 permanent riders were joined at each SEC Final by one wild card and two track reserves.

Defending champion, Martin Vaculík from Slovakia was automatically invited to participate in all final events. Nicki Pedersen and Grigorij Laguta secured their participation in all final events thanks to being in the top 3 of the general classification in the 2013 season.

Emil Sayfutdinov, Andreas Jonsson and Tomasz Gollob received and accepted a wild card to compete in the 2014 Speedway European Championships.

=== Qualified riders ===
#	Riders	2013 place	SEC Ch place	Appearance	Previous appearances in series
1	(Slovakia) Martin Vaculík	1		2nd	2013
5	(Denmark) Nicki Pedersen	2		2nd	2013
111	(Russia) Grigorij Laguta	3		2nd	2013
20	(Poland) Tomasz Gollob	7		2nd	2013
89	(Russia) Emil Sayfutdinov	9		2nd	2013
100	(Sweden) Andreas Jonsson	–		1st	
33	(Poland) Adrian Miedziński	–	1	1st	
27	(Poland) Janusz Kołodziej	–	2	1st	
25	(Denmark) Peter Kildemand	–	3	1st	
313	(Denmark) Kenni Larsen	–	4	1st	
13	(Sweden) Jonas Davidsson	–	5	1st	
19	(Croatia) Jurica Pavlic	12	6	2nd	2013
69	(Poland) Patryk Dudek	–	7	1st	
169	(Latvia) Andžejs Ļebedevs (wildcard)	–	8	1st	
84	(Germany) Martin Smolinski (wildcard)	–		1st	

=== Controversy ===
The European Union Motorcycle (FIM-Europe) introduced a formal ban that prevented riders in the Speedway Grand Prix taking part in the Speedway European Championship. The decision had been rumoured for weeks before being officially confirmed on 3 November 2013. That meant that all riders taking part in the World Championship could not be regular participants of the SEC. Amongst the riders who received permanent wild cards from the SEC were Emil Sayfutdinov, Andreas Jonsson and Tomasz Gollob.

Shortly after this, riders started to show the support to the SEC and their displeasure about the situation. As a result of this, already invited rider Tomasz Gollob, Andreas Jonsson, Nicki Pedersen and Emil Sayfutdinov sent an open letter to the FIM-Europe requesting the solution of the situation.

A statement from series organisers One Sport Lts. on 17 November 2013 pointed out that the ban was inconsistent with European law and announced an intention to take required legal action. They used the European Union Microsoft competition case as an example.

On 29 November, Emil Sayfutdinov announced that he was prepared to drop out of the 2014 SGP series in order to ride in the Speedway European Championship. As a reason, he explained that his Russian sponsors insisted their logos were seen in their country and SEC tournaments were transmitted by a Eurosport channel available in Russia, whereas Grand Prix competitions were not shown by any TV channel in Russia. Moreover, one of SEC tournaments was due to be held in Russia in 2014. On the same day, Tomasz Gollob also announced that he would participate in the Speedway European Championship.

On 6 December, Janek Konikiewicz, a representative for One Sport Lts., tweeted that "It seems that there will be no ban for SGP riders in SEC 2014. Another strong signal, that we have won – but still nothing official". On 20 December, he also tweeted another message: "OFFICIAL: One Sport received an official letter from FIM-Europe with information that they advised FIM to not ban any riders from SEC", which basically ended the story.

On 7 February 2014, the FIM board of directors officially took the decision to ban World Championship participants from participating in any kind of European Championships tournament. One Sport LLC declared their disapproval with the FIM's decision. Shortly after, Tomasz Gollob announced that he would refuse his wild card invitation for the SGP Bydgoszcz tournament, whereas Andreas Jonsson decided to refuse his SEC invitation in favour of participating in SGP. Emil Sayfutdinov asked to drop his application for SGP.

On 28 February 2014, the FIM board of directions officially announced that the previous ban for SGP riders to participate in SEC was delayed until 1 January 2015.

== Changes ==
In the 2014 season, the participating riders had the possibility to choose the number which would be on their race jacket. In the past, the riders in all tournaments had an obligatory number which was given to them by the organizers. During the first tournament, the defending champion wore a yellow race jacket and for all following tournaments, the current general classification leader wore the jacket.

== Calendar ==
=== Qualification ===
The calendar for qualification consisted of 3 Semifinal events and one SEC Challenge event. At the end of March, the first semifinal round was moved from Ukraine to Latvia.

Round	Date	City and venue	Winner	Runner-up	3rd placed	4th placed	Results
Semifinal 1	17 May	Daugavpils, Latvia Spīdveja centrs (Length: 373m)	(Denmark) Michael J. Jensen	(Latvia) Andžejs Ļebedevs	(Poland) Patryk Dudek	(Poland) Maciej Janowski	results
Semifinal 2	17 May	Krško, Slovenia Matija Gubec Stadium (Length: 387m)	(Latvia) Maksims Bogdanovs	(Poland) Przemyslaw Pawlicki	(Ukraine) Andriy Karpov	(Croatia) Jurica Pavlic	results
Semifinal 3	25 May	Žarnovica, Slovakia Speedwaystadium (Length: 400 m)	(Poland) Janusz Kołodziej	(Denmark) Peter Kildemand	(Sweden) Jonas Davidsson	(Poland) Adrian Miedziński	results
SEC Challenge	8 June	Debrecen, Hungary Speedway Stadium (Length: 398 m)	(Poland) Adrian Miedziński	(Poland) Janusz Kołodziej	(Denmark) Peter Kildemand	(Denmark) Kenni Larsen	results

=== Championship Series ===
A four-event calendar was scheduled for the final series, with events in Germany, Russia, Denmark and Poland.

Round	Date	City and venue	Winner	Runner-up	3rd placed	4th placed	Results
1	6 July	Güstrow, Germany Speedway Stadion Güstrow (Length: 298m)	(Denmark) Nicki Pedersen	(Denmark) Peter Kildemand	(Poland) Janusz Kołodziej	(Poland) Tomasz Gollob	results
2	20 July	Tolyatti, Russia Mega-Lada Stadium (Length: 353m)	(Denmark) Nicki Pedersen	(Russia) Emil Sayfutdinov	(Poland) Patryk Dudek	(Slovakia) Martin Vaculík	results
3	9 August	Holsted, Denmark Moldow Arena (Length: 300m)	(Russia) Emil Sayfutdinov	(Denmark) Peter Kildemand	(Slovakia) Martin Vaculík	(Latvia) Maksims Bogdanovs	results
4	19 September	Częstochowa, Poland Częstochowa Arena (Length: 368m)	(Russia) Grigory Laguta	(Denmark) Nicki Pedersen	(Denmark) Peter Kildemand	(Russia) Emil Sayfutdinov	results

== Classification ==
Pos.	Rider	Points	(Germany)	(Russia)	(Denmark)	(Poland)
1	(Russia) (89) Emil Sayfutdinov	54	11	15	13	15
2	(Denmark) (25) Peter Kildemand	48	11	12	13	12
3	(Denmark) (5) Nicki Pedersen	44	14	13	6	11
4	(Slovakia) (1) Martin Vaculík	41	7	14	12	8
5	(Poland) (27) Janusz Kołodziej	38	14	6	8	10
6	(Latvia) (21) Maksims Bogdanovs	34	8	8	11	7
7	(Croatia) (19) Jurica Pavlic	31	3	9	11	8
8	(Sweden) (100) Andreas Jonsson	31	9	5	9	8
9	(Poland) (20) Tomasz Gollob	27	9	4	5	9
10	(Latvia) (169) Andžejs Ļebedevs	22	7	8	4	3
11	(Poland) (33) Adrian Miedziński	21	9	5	4	3
12	(Russia) (111) Grigory Laguta	17	–	–	–	17
13	(Poland) (69) Patryk Dudek	16	4	12	–	–
14	(Denmark) (313) Kenni Larsen	14	6	3	3	2
15	(Sweden) (13) Jonas Davidsson	14	5	5	3	1
16	(Germany) (84) Martin Smolinski	13	5	3	–	5
17	(Denmark) (16) Niels-Kristian Iversen	10	–	–	10	–
18	(Denmark) (15) Michael Jepsen Jensen	9	–	–	9	–
19	(Poland) (16) Rune Holta	7	–	–	–	7
20	(Germany) (16) Christian Hefenbrock	4	4	–	–	–
-	(Russia) (16) Vitaly Bielousov	4	–	4	–	–
22	(Denmark) (16) Rasmus Jensen	2	–	–	2	–
23	(Latvia) (18) Ķasts Puodžuks	1	–	–	1	–
-	(Denmark) (17) Patrick Hougaard	1	–	–	1	–
25	(Germany) (17) Kai Huckenbeck	0	0	–	–	–
-	(Poland) (17) Artur Czaja	0	–	–	–	0
	(Germany) (18) Tobias Busch	—	ns	–	–	–
	(Russia) (17) Sergey Agaltsov	—	–	ns	–	–
	(Russia) (18) Michail Litvinov	—	–	ns	–	–
	(Poland) (18) Borys Miturski	—	–	–	–	ns

2014 Speedway European Champion
(Russia)
Emil Sayfutdinov
First title

== See also ==
- 2014 Speedway Grand Prix
