= 2002 European Speedway Club Champions' Cup =

European motorcycle speedway event

European Speedway Club Champions' Cup
- Start date: 18 July
- End date: 5 October

The 2002 European Speedway Club Champions' Cup was the fifth motorcycle speedway championship for clubs competing in Europe. It was organised by the European Motorcycle Union (UEM). The competition was primarily for Eastern European teams and only featured Polish teams from three of the 'Big four' leagues, with the British, Swedish and Danish leagues choosing not to compete.

Mega-Lada Togliatti won the championship. The competition was somewhat farcical because teams drafted in some riders that had previously not represented the clubs.

== Final ==
- 5 October 2002
- (Czech Republic) Svítkov Stadium, Pardubice

Placing	Team / Rider name	Total	1	2	3	4	5	6	7	8	9	10	11	12	13	14	15	16	17	18	19	20	21	22	23	24	25
1	(Russia) Mega-Lada Togliatti	75	4	8	9	11	14	17	21	24	28	31	33	36	40	43	47	50	51	55	57	60	64	66	69	71	75
1	(1) (Australia) Ryan Sullivan	15	4							3						3			1								4
1	(2) (Australia) Jason Crump	20		4							4						4			4			4
1	(3) (Russia) Sergey Darkin	10			1							3	2								2			2
1	(4) (Russia) Oleg Kurguskin	14				2		3						3								3			3
1	(5) (Russia) Roman Povazhny	16					3		4						4			3								2
2	(Czech Republic) AMK Pardubice	71	3	6	8	9	13	17	19	20	23	27	31	35	38	39	41	41	45	48	49	57	58	61	65	68	71
2	(1) (Australia) Leigh Adams	25	3									4		4						3		8J				3
2	(2) (United States) Greg Hancock	14		3				4							3						1						3
2	(3) (Czech Republic) Marian Jirout	6			2				2							1						-	1
2	(4) (Czech Republic) Tomáš Suchánek	7				1				1							2	0						3
2	(5) (England) Lee Richardson	19					4				3		4						4						4
3	(Poland) Apator Toruń	56	2	3	7	11	13	15	18	22	24	25	26	28	29	37	38	40	43	44	47	48	50	51	53	54	56
3	(1) (Poland) Tomasz Bajerski	7	2								2				1							1		1
3	(2) (Poland) Tomasz Chrzanowski	4		1								1				-		-							2
3	(3) (Poland) Wiesław Jaguś	19			4			2								8J	1		3							1
3	(4) (Poland) Mariusz Puszakowski	11				4			3				1							1							2
3	(5) (Poland) Robert Sawina	15					2			4				2				2			3		2
4	(Germany) MSC Diedenbergen	53	0	2	5	8	9	10	11	13	13	15	18	19	21	25	28	30	32	34	38	40	43	47	48	52	53
4	(1) (Germany) Thomas Stange	4	0					1					-					-					3
4	(2) (Germany) Joachim Kugelmann	6		2					1					1					2					-
4	(3) (Czech Republic) Aleš Dryml, Jr.	14			3					2					2					2				4	1
4	(4) (Czech Republic) Lukáš Dryml	18				3					0		3			4					4					4
4	(5) (Australia) Steve Johnston	11					1					2					3	2				2					1
5	(Latvia) Lokomotiv Daugavpils	4	1	1	1	1	1	1	1	1	2	2	2	2	2	2	2	2	2	2	4	4	4	4	4	4	4
5	(1) (Latvia) Andrejs Koroļevs	3	1						0								0				2				0
5	(2) (Latvia) Nikolay Kokin	0		0						0			0									0				0
5	(3) (Latvia) Kjasts Puodzuks	1			0						1			0				-									0
5	(4) (Latvia) Aleksandr Biznya	0				0						0			0				0				0
5	(5) (Latvia) Leonid Paura	0					0	0								0				0				0
Placing	Team / Rider name	Total	1	2	3	4	5	6	7	8	9	10	11	12	13	14	15	16	17	18	19	20	21	22	23	24	25

M - exclusion for exceeding two minute time allowance • T - exclusion for touching the tapes • X - other exclusion • E - retired or mechanical failure • F - fell

Helmet colours were permanent for each team (red, blue, white, yellow/black and green). Colours in tables show gate positions:
gate A – inside	gate B	gate C	gate D	gate E – outside
