= 2012 Individual Speedway Latvian Championship =

The 2012 Latvian Individual Speedway Championship was the 38th Latvian Individual Speedway Championship season. The final took place on 8 July 2012 in Daugavpils, Latvia.

== Results ==
- July 8, 2012
- LVA Daugavpils

Placing	Rider	Total	1	2	3	4	5	6	7	8	9	10	11	12	13	14	15	16	17	18	19	20	Pts	Pos	21	22
1	(Latvia) (4) Maksims Bogdanovs	13	2							3				3				3				2	13	1		3
2	(Poland) (6) Mirosław Jabłoński	13		3				3			3							2			2		13	2		2
3	(Latvia) (3) Kjasts Puodžuks	12	3						2				1				3				3		12	3	3	
4	(Poland) (12) Michał Szczepaniak	12			3					2		3			3						1		12	4	2	
5	(Poland) (14) Krzysztof Jabłoński	11				3		2					3		2							1	11	5		
6	(Poland) (13) Mateusz Szczepaniak	10				2	3							2		3					0		10	6		
7	(Latvia) (5) Andzej Lebedev	10		2			1					2					2					3	10	7		
8	(Finland) (1) Timo Lahti	9	1				2				2				1				3				9	8		
9	(Latvia) (15) Vyacheslav Girucky	7				1			3			1						1	1				7	9		
10	(Russia) (10) Vadim Tarasenko	7			2			1						1			1		2				7	10		
11	(Latvia) (8) Yevgeny Karavacky	5		0						1			2			2			X				5	11		
12	(Latvia) (2) Ivan Pleshakov	4	E					E				0				1				3			4	12		
13	(Finland) (7) Teemu Lahti	4		1					1					0	F					2			4	13		
14	(Latvia) (9) Andrey Kovalchuk	1			0		0						0					0		1			1	14		
15	(Latvia) (16) Vadim Timerman	1				E				0	1						0			0			1	15		
16	(Latvia) (11) Yevgeny Kostygov	1			1				0		E					0						0	1	16		
Placing	Rider	Total	1	2	3	4	5	6	7	8	9	10	11	12	13	14	15	16	17	18	19	20	Pts	Pos	21	22

m - exclusion for exceeding two minute time allowance • t - exclusion for touching the tapes • x - other exclusion • e - retired or mechanical failure • f - fell • ns - non-starter • nc - non-classify

gate A - inside	gate B	gate C	gate D - outside
