= 2008 European Speedway Club Champions' Cup =

European motorcycle speedway event

European Speedway Club Champions' Cup
- Start date: 31 May
- End date: 6 September

The 2008 European Speedway Club Champions' Cup was the 11th motorcycle speedway championship for clubs competing in Europe. It was organised by the European Motorcycle Union (UEM). The competition was primarily for Eastern European teams and only featured Polish teams from three of the 'Big four' leagues, with the British, Swedish and Danish leagues choosing not to compete.

Mega-Lada Togliatti won the championship for a record fourth time.

== Calendar ==
| Day | Venue | Winner | |
Qualification
| 31 May | (Latvia) Daugavpils | (Russia) Mega Lada Togliatti | result |
Final
| 6 September | (Czech Republic) Slaný | (Russia) Mega Lada Togliatti | result |

== Qualification ==
Mega Lada Togliatti and Lokomotiv Daugavpils qualified for the final.

- 31 May 2008 (5:00 pm)
- (Latvia) Stadium Lokomotīve, Daugavpils

| Placing | Team / Rider name | Total | 1 | 2 | 3 | 4 | 5 | 6 | 7 | 8 | 9 | 10 | 11 | 12 | 13 | 14 | 15 | 16 | Pts | 17 | 18 | 19 | 20 |
| 1 | (Russia) Mega Lada Togliatti | 45 | 3 | 6 | 9 | 12 | 15 | 17 | 19 | 21 | 22 | 25 | 28 | 30 | 32 | 35 | 38 | 41 | | 41 | 41 | 43 | 45 |
| 1 | (Denmark) (9) Nicki Pedersen | 14 | | | 3 | | 3 | | | | | 3 | | | | | | 3 | 12 | | | | 2 |
| 1 | (Russia) (10) Emil Sayfutdinov | 7 | | | | 3 | | - | | | 1 | | | | | | 3 | | 7 | | F2 |
| 1 | (Russia) (11) Roman Ivanov | 10 | | 3 | | | | | | 2 | | | - | | | 3 | | | 8 | | | 2 |
| 1 | (Russia) (12) Daniil Ivanov | 4 | - | | | | | | 2 | | | | | 2 | - | | | | 4 | E |
| 1 | (Australia) (19) Leigh Adams | 10 | 3 | | | | | 2 | | | | | 3 | | 2 | | | | 10 |
| 2 | (Latvia) Lokomotiv Daugavpils | 41 | 2 | 4 | 5 | 7 | 8 | 11 | 14 | 17 | 20 | 20 | 22 | 25 | 28 | 30 | 30 | 32 | | 35 | 38 | 38 | 41 |
| 2 | (Russia) (5) Grigory Laguta | 12 | 2 | | | | | 3 | | | | | 2 | | | | | 2 | 9 | | | | 3 |
| 2 | (Latvia) (6) Maksims Bogdanovs | 6 | | 2 | | | 1 | | | | | | | - | | | F | | 3 | 3 |
| 2 | (Latvia) (7) Andrejs Koroļevs | 7 | | | | 2 | | | 3 | | | 0 | | | | 2 | | | 7 | | | 0 |
| 2 | (Latvia) (8) Ķasts Poudžuks | 4 | | | 1 | | | | | - | 3 | | | | F/- | | | | 4 | | - |
| 2 | (Poland) (18) Paweł Miesiąc | 12 | | | | | | | | 3 | | | | 3 | 3 | | | | 9 | | 3 |
| 3 | (Ukraine) Shakhtar Chervonograd | 18 | 1 | 1 | 3 | 3 | 5 | 5 | 5 | 5 | 5 | 6 | 7 | 7 | 8 | 9 | 11 | 11 | | 12 | 14 | 17 | 18 |
| 3 | (Latvia) (13) Jevgēņijs Karavackis | 1 | | 0 | | | | | E | | X/F | | | | | | | 0 | 0 | 1 |
| 3 | (Ukraine) (14) Aleksandr Borodaj | 5 | 1 | | | | | | | 0 | | 1 | | | | | 2 | | 4 | | | | 1 |
| 3 | (Russia) (15) Ruslan Gatiatow | 5 | | | 2 | | | 0 | | | | | | 0 | | 1 | | | 3 | | 2 |
| 3 | (Ukraine) (16) Andriej Karpov | 7 | | | | 0 | 2 | | | | | | 1 | | 1 | | | | 4 | | | 3 |
| 4 | (Poland) Unia Leszno | 16 | 0 | 1 | 1 | 2 | 2 | 3 | 4 | 5 | 7 | 9 | 9 | 10 | 10 | 10 | 11 | 12 | | 14 | 15 | 16 | 16 |
| 4 | (Poland) (1) Adam Kajoch | 4 | | | | 1 | | | | 1 | | | | 1 | | | | 1 | 4 | | | | 0 |
| 4 | (Poland) (2) Sławomir Musielak | 4 | | | 0 | | | | 1 | | | | 0 | | | | 1 | | 2 | 2 |
| 4 | (Poland) (3) Przemysław Pawlicki | 5 | | 1 | | | | 1 | | | | 2 | | | X/F | | | | 4 | | | 1 |
| 4 | (Poland) (4) Mateusz Łukaszewki | 3 | 0 | | | | F | | | | 2 | | | | | 0 | | | 2 | | 1 |
| Placing | Team / Rider name | Total | 1 | 2 | 3 | 4 | 5 | 6 | 7 | 8 | 9 | 10 | 11 | 12 | 13 | 14 | 15 | 16 | Pts | 17 | 18 | 19 | 20 |

M - exclusion for exceeding two-minute time allowance • T - exclusion for touching the tapes • X - other exclusion • E - retired or mechanical failure • F - fell

Helmet colours were permanent for each team (Red, Blue, White and Yellow/Black). Colours in diagrams indicate gate positions:
| gate A – inside | gate B | gate C | gate D – outside |

== Final ==
- 6 September 2008
- (Czech Republic) Slaný Speedway Stadium, Slaný

| Placing | Team / Rider name | Total | 1 | 2 | 3 | 4 | 5 | 6 | 7 | 8 | 9 | 10 | 11 | 12 | 13 | 14 | 15 | 16 | Pts | 17 | 18 | 19 | 20 |
| 1 | (Russia) Mega Lada Togliatti | 46 | 3 | 6 | 9 | 11 | 14 | 14 | 17 | 18 | 19 | 22 | 25 | 28 | 31 | 34 | 36 | 39 | | 39 | 42 | 45 | 46 |
| 1 | (9) Nicki Pedersen | 15 | | | 3 | | 3 | | | | | 3 | | | | | | 3 | 12 | | | 3 |
| 1 | (10) Denis Saifutdinov | 3 | | | | 2 | | - | | | 1 | | | | | | - | | 3 | E1 |
| 1 | (11) Leigh Adams | 13 | | 3 | | | | | | 1 | | | 3 | | | 3 | | | 10 | | 3 |
| 1 | (12) Emil Sayfutdinov | 13 | 3 | | | | | | 3 | | | | | 3 | 3 | | | | 12 | | | | 1 |
| 1 | (19) Daniil Ivanov | 2 | | | | | | M | | | | | | | | | 2 | | 2 |
| 2 | (Hungary) Simon&Wolf Debrecen | 31 | 1 | 2 | 2 | 2 | 4 | 5 | 7 | 10 | 13 | 14 | 16 | 16 | 18 | 18 | 21 | 22 | | 24 | 26 | 28 | 31 |
| 2 | (5) Maciej Kuciapa | 7 | 1 | | | | | 1 | | | | | 2 | | | | | 1 | 5 | | 2 |
| 2 | (6) József Tabaka | 8 | | 1 | | | 2 | | | | | | | 0 | | | 3 | | 6 | | | 2 |
| 2 | (7) Sándor Tihanyi | 0 | | | | 0 | | | - | | | - | | | | - | | | 0 | - |
| 2 | (8) Matej Ferjan | 11 | | | 0 | | | | | 3 | 3 | | | | 2 | | | | 8 | | | | 3 |
| 2 | (18) Hynek Stichauer | 5 | | | | | | | 2 | | | 1 | | | | F | | | 3 | 2 |
| 3 | (Czech Republic) AK Slaný | 30 | 0 | 2 | 3 | 6 | 7 | 10 | 11 | 13 | 15 | 15 | 15 | 17 | 18 | 20 | 21 | 23 | | 26 | 27 | 28 | 30 |
| 3 | (1) Peter Karlsson | 11 | | | | 3 | | | | 2 | | | | 2 | | | | 2 | 9 | | | | 2 |
| 3 | (2) Tomasz Piszcz | 6 | | | 1 | | | | 1 | | | | E2 | | | | 1 | | 3 | 3 |
| 3 | (3) Daniel Jeleniewski | 7 | | 2 | | | | 3 | | | | Fx | | | 1 | | | | 6 | | | 1 |
| 3 | (4) Michał Szczepaniak | 6 | 0 | | | | 1 | | | | 2 | | | | | 2 | | | 5 | | 1 |
| 3 | (17) Martin Malek | 0 | | | | | | | | | | | | | | | | | 0 |
| 4 | (Latvia) Lokomotiv Daugavpils | 13 | 2 | 2 | 4 | 5 | 5 | 7 | 7 | 7 | 7 | 9 | 10 | 11 | 11 | 12 | 12 | 12 | | 13 | 13 | 13 | 13 |
| 4 | (13) Leonid Paura | 0 | | 0 | | | | | - | | 0 | | | | | | | F | 0 | - |
| 4 | (14) Maksims Bogdanovs | 4 | 2 | | | | | | | 0 | | 2 | | | | | 0 | | 4 | | | 0 |
| 4 | (15) Andrejs Koroļevs | 6 | | | 2 | | | 2 | | | | | | 1 | | 1 | | | 6 | | | | 0 |
| 4 | (16) Ķasts Poudžuks | 2 | | | | 1 | 0 | | | | | | 1 | | - | | | | 2 | | 0 |
| 4 | (20) Vjačeslavs Giruckis | 1 | | | | | | | 0 | | | | | | 0 | | | | 0 | 1 |
| Placing | Team / Rider name | Total | 1 | 2 | 3 | 4 | 5 | 6 | 7 | 8 | 9 | 10 | 11 | 12 | 13 | 14 | 15 | 16 | Pts | 17 | 18 | 19 | 20 |

M - exclusion for exceeding two-minute time allowance • T - exclusion for touching the tapes • X - other exclusion • E - retired or mechanical failure • F - fell

Helmet colours were permanent for each team (Red, Blue, White and Yellow/Black). Colours in diagrams indicate gate positions:
| gate A – inside | gate B | gate C | gate D – outside |
