= 1999 Individual Speedway Latvian Championship =

The 1999 Latvian Individual Speedway Championship was the 25th Latvian Individual Speedway Championship season with finals on 12 August 1999 in Daugavpils, Latvia. The champion at the end of the season was Adam Skórnicki.

== Results ==
- August 12, 1999
- LVA Daugavpils

Placing	Rider	Total	1	2	3	4	5	6	7	8	9	10	11	12	13	14	15	16	17	18	19	20	Pts	Pos	21	22
1	(Poland) (14) Adam Skórnicki	13				3		3					3		3							1	13	1	3	
2	(Latvia) (5) Nikolay Kokin	13		3			2					2					3					3	13	2	2	
3	(Poland) (15) Robert Mikołajczak	13				2			3			3						3	2				13	3	1	
4	(Russia) (11) Sergey Kuzin	12			3				2		3					2						2	12	4		
5	(Latvia) (1) Vladimir Voronkov	10	E				3				2				2				3				10	5		
6	(Ukraine) (2) Igor Marko	9	2					-				1				3				3			9	6		
7	(Latvia) (12) Aleksandr Biznya	9			2					3		F			1						3		9	7		
8	(Russia) (3) Sergey Yeroshin	9	3						1				1				2				2		9	8		
9	(Poland) (6) Dariusz Baliński	8		2				2			1							2			1		8	9		
10	(Latvia) (8) Vitaly Biznya	6		1						2			2			1			E				6	10		
11	(Latvia) (10) Maksim Andreev	5			1			1						2			F		1				5	11		
12	(Poland) (13) Dariusz Łowicki	4				0	1							3		0					X		4	12		
13	(Russia) (9) Yevgeny Yepachintsev	3			0		0						0					1		2			3	13		
14	(Latvia) (16) Leonid Paura	3				1				1	F						X			1			3	14		
15	(Latvia) (7) Denis Popovich	1		0					E					1	0					F			1	15		
16	(Latvia) (4) Andrejs Koroļevs	0	F							-				-				-				-	0	16		
R1	(Latvia) (R1) Yury Sokolov	0	X							F								0					0	R1		
R2	(Ukraine) (R2) Valery Polyukhovich	0						0						E								E	0	R2		
Placing	Rider	Total	1	2	3	4	5	6	7	8	9	10	11	12	13	14	15	16	17	18	19	20	Pts	Pos	21	22

m - exclusion for exceeding two minute time allowance • t - exclusion for touching the tapes • x - other exclusion • e - retired or mechanical failure • f - fell • ns - non-starter • nc - non-classify

gate A - inside	gate B	gate C	gate D - outside
