= 1995 Individual Speedway Latvian Championship =

The 1995 Latvian Individual Speedway Championship was the 21st Latvian Individual Speedway Championship season. The final took place on 14 September 1995 in Daugavpils, Latvia. The champion at the end of the season was Andrejs Koroļevs.

== Final ==
- September 14, 1995
- LVA Daugavpils

Placing	Rider	Total	1	2	3	4	5	6	7	8	9	10	11	12	13	14	15	16	17	18	19	20	Pts	Pos	21	22
1	(Latvia) (1) Andrejs Koroļevs	14	3				3				2				3				3				14	1	3	
2	(Ukraine) (3) Igor Marko	14	2						3				3				3				3		14	2	2	
3	(Ukraine) (2) Aleksandr Lyatosinsky	12	1					3				2				3				3			12	3		
4	(Latvia) (4) Vladimir Voronkov	11	0							3				3				3				2	11	4		
5	(Ukraine) (11) Vladimir Kolodiy	11			3				2		1					2						3	11	5		
6	(Latvia) (5) Nikolay Kokin	11		3			2					3					2					1	11	6		
7	(Latvia) (16) Aleksandr Biznya	9				3				2	3						1			F			9	7		
8	(Latvia) (10) Oleg Budko	6			1			2						2			0		1				6	8		
9	(Belarus) (8) Viktor Sidorenko	6		0						1			2			1			2				6	9		
10	(Ukraine) (7) Pyotr Fedyk	6		1					1					0	2					2			6	10		
11	(Latvia) (15) Vitaly Biznya	5				2			E			1						2	0				5	11		
12	(Latvia) (9) Normund Dobums	4			2		1						1					-		-			4	12		
13	(Belarus) (13) Aleksey Taranov	3				X	-							1		-					2		3	13		
14	(Latvia) (6) Maksim Andreev	3		2				1			F							X			F		3	14		
15	(Latvia) (12) Aleksey Mikheev	2			0					0		0			1						1		2	15		
Placing	Rider	Total	1	2	3	4	5	6	7	8	9	10	11	12	13	14	15	16	17	18	19	20	Pts	Pos	21	22

m - exclusion for exceeding two minute time allowance • t - exclusion for touching the tapes • x - other exclusion • e - retired or mechanical failure • f - fell • ns - non-starter • nc - non-classify

gate A - inside	gate B	gate C	gate D - outside
