= 2014 Speedway European Championship qualification =

The first semifinal of the 2014 Speedway European Championship took place in Daugavpils, Latvia, on 17 May 2014, as a replacement for a previously planned event in Rivne Speedway Stadium, Ukraine.

== Semifinal 1 ==
- 17 May 2014
- Latvia, Daugavpils
- Spīdveja centrs (Length: 373m)
- References

Placing	Rider	Total	1	2	3	4	5	6	7	8	9	10	11	12	13	14	15	16	17	18	19	20	Pts	Pos	21	22
Gold medal	(Denmark) (7) Michael Jepsen Jensen	14		3					3					3	3					2			14	Gold medal		
Silver medal	(Latvia) (11) Andrzej Lebiediew	11			3				2		3					e						3	11	Silver medal		3
Bronze medal	(Poland) (2) Patryk Dudek	11	2					0				3				3				3			11	Bronze medal		2
4.	(Poland) (14) Maciej Janowski	11				3		2					2		2							2	11	4.		1
5.	(Latvia) (6) Kjastas Puodzuks	11		0				3			2							3			3		11	5.		0
6.	(Russia) (8) Renat Gafurow	10		2						2			3			1			2				10	6.	3	
7.	(Czech Republic) (1) Josef Franc	10	3				2				1				1				3				10	7.	2	
8.	(Australia) (10) Rory Schlein	8			2			1						1			3		1				8	8.		
9.	(Sweden) (16) Dennis Andersson	7				1				3	0						2			1			7	9.		
10.	(Finland) (9) Tero Aarnio	7			1		3						1					2		0			7	10.		
11.	(Russia) (13) Andriej Kudriaszow	7				2	t							2		2					1		7	11.		
12.	(Germany) (5) Max Dilger	5		1			1					2					0					1	5	12.		
13.	(Czech Republic) (3) Eduard Krčmář	4	0						1				0				1				2		4	13.		
14.	(Russia) (4) Siergiej Darkin	2	1							f/ns				0				1				0	2	14.		
15.	(Latvia) (12) Iwan Pleszakow	2			e					1		1			x						ns		2	15.		
16.	(Romania) (15) Adrian Gheorghe	0				0			0			0						x	ns				0	16.		
17.	(Ukraine) (12) Stanisław Mielniczuk	0			e					ns		ns			ns						ns		0	17.		
18.	(Latvia) (13) Wiaczesław Giruckis	0				ns	e							ns		ns					ns		0	18.		
Placing	Rider	Total	1	2	3	4	5	6	7	8	9	10	11	12	13	14	15	16	17	18	19	20	Pts	Pos	21	22

m - exclusion for exceeding two minute time allowance • t - exclusion for touching the tapes • x - other exclusion • e - retired or mechanical failure • f - fell • ns - non-starter • nc - non-classify

gate A - inside	gate B	gate C	gate D - outside

== Semifinal 2 ==
- 17 May 2014
- Slovenia, Krško
- Matija Gubec Stadium (Length: 387m)
- References

Placing	Rider	Total	1	2	3	4	5	6	7	8	9	10	11	12	13	14	15	16	17	18	19	20	Pts	Pos	21	22
Gold medal	(Latvia) (9) Maksims Bogdanow	13			3		1						3					3		3			13	Gold medal		3
Silver medal	(Poland) (13) Przemysław Pawlicki	13				2	3							2		3					3		13	Silver medal		2
Bronze medal	(Ukraine) (4) Andriej Karpow	13	3							3				3				2				2	13	Bronze medal		1
4.	(Croatia) (14) Jurica Pavlic	12				3		3					2		1							3	12	4.		
5.	(Denmark) (3) Hans Andersen	11	2						3				1				3				2		11	5.		
6.	(Sweden) (1) Daniel Nermark	9	0				2				3				2				2				9	6.	3	
7.	(Denmark) (15) Anders Thomsen	9				1			2			2						1	3				9	7.	2	
8.	(Hungary) (12) Norbert Magosi	9			0					2		3			3						1		9	8.	d	
9.	(Slovenia) (10) Matic Voldrih	8			2			2						1			2		1				8	9.		
10.	(Italy) (2) Michele Paco Castagna	6	1					1				0				2				2			6	10.		
11.	(Germany) (11) Christian Hefenbrock	6			1				1		2					1						1	6	11.		
12.	(Slovenia) (7) Aleksander Conda	3		3					ns					ns	ns					ns			3	12.		
13.	(Austria) (5) Daniel Gappmaier	3		2			0					1					0					0	3	13.		
14.	(Czech Republic) (16) Ondrej Smetana	3				0				0	1						1			1			3	14.		
15.	(Italy) (8) Mattia Carpanese	2		1						1			0			0			0				2	15.		
16.	(Netherlands) (6) Henry van der Steen	0		0				0			0							0			0		0	16.		
17.	(Slovenia) (7) Denis Stojs	0		ns					0					0	0					ns			0	17.		
18.	(Slovenia) (7) Maks Gregoric	0		ns					ns					ns	ns					0			0	18.		
Placing	Rider	Total	1	2	3	4	5	6	7	8	9	10	11	12	13	14	15	16	17	18	19	20	Pts	Pos	21	22

m - exclusion for exceeding two minute time allowance • t - exclusion for touching the tapes • x - other exclusion • e - retired or mechanical failure • f - fell • ns - non-starter • nc - non-classify

gate A - inside	gate B	gate C	gate D - outside

== Semifinal 3 ==
- 25 May 2014
- Slovakia, Žarnovica
- Speedwaystadium (Length: 400m)
- References

Placing	Rider	Total	1	2	3	4	5	6	7	8	9	10	11	12	13	14	15	16	17	18	19	20	Pts	Pos	21	22
Gold medal	(Poland) (10) Janusz Kołodziej	14			3			3						3			3		2				14	Gold medal		
Silver medal	(Denmark) (2) Peter Kildemand	13	3					2				3				3				2			13	Silver medal		
Bronze medal	(Sweden) (13) Jonas Davidsson	12				2	3							2		2					3		12	Bronze medal		
4.	(Poland) (6) Adrian Miedziński	10		3				0			3							3			1		10	4.		
5.	(Czech Republic) (8) Tomáš Suchánek	10		1						3			3			0			3				10	5.		
6.	(Denmark) (14) Kenni Larsen	10				3		1					nc		3							3	10	6.		
7.	(Sweden) (9) Magnus Zetterstroem	10			2		1						2					2		3			10	7.		
8.	(Czech Republic) (3) Aleš Dryml Jr.	10	2						3				1				2				2		10	8.		
9.	(Finland) (15) Kauko Nieminen	6				1			2			2						1	d				6	9.		
10.	(United Kingdom) (5) Richard Hall	6		2			2					1					1					d	6	10.		
11.	(Germany) (1) Kai Huckenbeck	5	1				0				2				1				1				5	11.		
12.	(Czech Republic) (4) Martin Málek	4	0							2				0				0				2	4	12.		
13.	(Germany) (7) Kevin Woelbert	4		0					0					1	2					1			4	13.		
14.	(Hungary) (11) József Tabaka	4			1				1		0					1						1	4	14.		
15.	(France) (16) Sebastien Tresarrieu	3				d				1	2						0			d			3	15.		
16.	(France) (12) Gabriel Dubernard	0			0					0		0			0						0		0	16.		
17.	(Czech Republic) (0) Martin Gavenda	0																					0	17.		
18.	(Austria) (0) Anton Wannasek	0																					0	18.		
Placing	Rider	Total	1	2	3	4	5	6	7	8	9	10	11	12	13	14	15	16	17	18	19	20	Pts	Pos	21	22

m - exclusion for exceeding two minute time allowance • t - exclusion for touching the tapes • x - other exclusion • e - retired or mechanical failure • f - fell • ns - non-starter • nc - non-classify

gate A - inside	gate B	gate C	gate D - outside

The final order for placings 4–8 was decided by the jury, after heavy rain forced the cancellation of the run-off.

== SEC Challenge ==
- 8 June 2014
- Hungary, Debrecen
- Speedway Stadium (Length: 398m)
- References

Placing	Rider	Total	1	2	3	4	5	6	7	8	9	10	11	12	13	14	15	16	17	18	19	20	Pts	Pos	21	22
Gold medal	(Poland) (5) Adrian Miedziński	12		3			2					2					3					2	12	Gold medal		
Silver medal	(Poland) (16) Janusz Kolodziej	12				3				2	3						2			2			12	Silver medal		
Bronze medal	(Denmark) (6) Peter Kildemand	10		0				2			2							3			3		10	Bronze medal		
4.	(Denmark) (4) Kenni Larsen	9	1							3				3				2				e	9	4.		
5.	(Sweden) (12) Jonas Davidsson	9			3					1		3			2						0		9	5.		
6.	(Croatia) (13) Jurica Pavlic	9				1	3							2		1					2		9	6.		
7.	(Poland) (7) Patryk Dudek	8		1					d					1	3					3			8	7.	3	
8.	(Latvia) (1) Andrzej Lebiediew	8	3				1				1				0				3				8	8.	2	
9.	(Czech Republic) (14) Josef Franc	8				0		3					1		1							3	8	9.	1	
10.	(Latvia) (11) Maksims Bogdanow	8			2				3		0					2						1	8	10.	0	
11.	(Latvia) (8) Kjastas Puodzuks	7		2						0			3			0			2				7	11.		
12.	(Ukraine) (2) Andriej Karpow	6	2					0				0				3				1			6	12.		
13.	(Denmark) (15) Michael Jepsen Jensen	6				2			2			1						1	0				6	13.		
14.	(Hungary) (3) Jozsef Tabaka	3	0						1				0				1				1		3	14.		
15.	(Denmark) (10) Anders Thomsen	3			1			1						0			d		1				3	15.		
16.	(Czech Republic) (9) Martin Malek	2			0		0						2					0		0			2	16.		
17.	(Sweden) (0) Daniel Nermark	0																					0	17.		
Placing	Rider	Total	1	2	3	4	5	6	7	8	9	10	11	12	13	14	15	16	17	18	19	20	Pts	Pos	21	22

m - exclusion for exceeding two minute time allowance • t - exclusion for touching the tapes • x - other exclusion • e - retired or mechanical failure • f - fell • ns - non-starter • nc - non-classify

gate A - inside	gate B	gate C	gate D - outside

== See also ==
- Motorcycle Speedway
