= 2001 European Speedway Club Champions' Cup =

European motorcycle speedway event

European Speedway Club Champions' Cup
- Start date: 27 May
- End date: 16 September

The 2001 European Speedway Club Champions' Cup was the fourth motorcycle speedway championship for clubs competing in Europe. It was organised by the European Motorcycle Union (UEM). The competition was primarily for Eastern European teams and only featured Polish teams from three of the 'Big four' leagues, with the British, Swedish and Danish leagues choosing not to compete.

Polonia Bydgoszcz won the Championship for the third time.

== Qualifying ==
Lokomotiv Daugavpils qualified for the final.

- 27 May 2001
- (Latvia) Stadium Lokomotīve, Daugavpils

| Placing | Team / Rider name | Total | 1 | 2 | 3 | 4 | 5 | 6 | 7 | 8 | 9 | 10 | 11 | 12 | 13 | 14 | 15 | 16 | Pts | 17 | 18 | 19 | 20 |
| 1 | (Latvia) Lokomotiv Daugavpils | 51 | 3 | 6 | 8 | 11 | 13 | 16 | 19 | 20 | 23 | 26 | 27 | 30 | 33 | 36 | 38 | 41 | | 43 | 46 | 48 | 51 |
| 1 | (13) (Latvia) Andrejs Koroļevs | 15 | | 3 | | | | | 3 | | 3 | | | | | | | 3 | 12 | | | | 3 |
| 1 | (14) (Latvia) Nikolay Kokin | 8 | 3 | | | | | | | 1 | | - | | | | | 2 | | 6 | 2 |
| 1 | (15) (Latvia) Vladimir Voronkov | 10 | | | 2 | | | - | | | | | | 3 | | 3 | | | 8 | | | 2 |
| 1 | (16) (Latvia) Aleksandr Biznya | 6 | | | | 3 | 2 | | | | | | 1 | | - | | | | 6 | | - |
| 1 | (20) (Poland) Adam Skórnicki | 12 | | | | | | 3 | | | | 3 | | | 3 | | | | 9 | | 3 |
| 2 | (Hungary) Simon & Wolf Debrecen | 33 | 0 | 2 | 5 | 6 | 9 | 9 | 9 | 9 | 11 | 13 | 16 | 18 | 18 | 20 | 23 | 25 | | 28 | 30 | 33 | 33 |
| 2 | (9) (Hungary) Sandor Tihanyi | 10 | | | 3 | | 3 | | | | | 2 | | | | | | 2 | 10 | | | | E |
| 2 | (10) (Hungary) Csaba Hell | 8 | | | | 1 | | - | | | 2 | | | | | | 3 | | 6 | | 2 |
| 2 | (11) (Hungary) Laszlo Szatmari | 10 | | 2 | | | | | | F | | | 3 | | | 2 | | | 7 | | | 3 |
| 2 | (12) (Hungary) Zsolt Bence | 3 | X | | | | | | 0 | | | | | - | - | | | | 0 | 3 |
| 2 | (19) (Hungary) Gábor Szegvári | 2 | | | | | | E | | | | | | 2 | F | | | | 2 |
| 3 | (Ukraine) Tekhnik Rivne | 20 | 2 | 2 | 2 | 4 | 4 | 6 | 7 | 9 | 10 | 11 | 13 | 13 | 14 | 15 | 15 | 16 | | 17 | 18 | 19 | 20 |
| 3 | (5) (Ukraine) Aleksandr Lyatosinsky | 8 | 2 | | | | | 2 | | | | | 2 | | | | | 1 | 7 | | | | 1 |
| 3 | (6) (Russia) Grigory Kharchenko | 0 | | F | | | - | | | | | | | - | | | - | | 0 | - |
| 3 | (7) (Ukraine) Igor Marko | 6 | | | | 2 | | | 1 | | | 1 | | | | 1 | | | 5 | | | 1 |
| 3 | (8) (Ukraine) Igor Yepifanov | 5 | | | 0 | | | | | 2 | 1 | | | | 1 | | | | 4 | | 1 |
| 3 | (18) (Ukraine) Pyotr Fedyk | 1 | | | | | 0 | | | | | | | 0 | | | 0 | | 0 | 1 |
| 4 | (Slovenia) ST Lendava | 16 | 1 | 2 | 3 | 3 | 4 | 5 | 7 | 10 | 10 | 10 | 10 | 11 | 13 | 13 | 14 | 14 | | 14 | 14 | 14 | 16 |
| 4 | (1) (Slovenia) Josef Koren | 4 | | | | F | | | | 3 | | | | 1 | | | | 0 | 4 | | | 0 |
| 4 | (2) (Slovenia) Denis Štojs | 6 | | | 1 | | | | 2 | | | | F | | | | 1 | | 4 | | | | 2 |
| 4 | (3) (Slovenia) Primož Legan | 4 | | 1 | | | | 1 | | | | 0 | | | 2 | | | | 4 | | 0 |
| 4 | (4) (Slovenia) Miha Jezek | 2 | 1 | | | | 1 | | | | E | | | | | 0 | | | 2 | 0 |
| 4 | (17) - | 0 | | | | | | | | | | | | | | | | | 0 |
| Placing | Team / Rider name | Total | 1 | 2 | 3 | 4 | 5 | 6 | 7 | 8 | 9 | 10 | 11 | 12 | 13 | 14 | 15 | 16 | Pts | 17 | 18 | 19 | 20 |

M - exclusion for exceeding two-minute time allowance • T - exclusion for touching the tapes • X - other exclusion • E - retired or mechanical failure • F - fell

Helmet colours were permanent for each team (Red, Blue, White and Yellow/Black). Colours in diagrams indicate gate positions:
| gate A – inside | gate B | gate C | gate D – outside |

== Final ==
- 16 September 2001
- (Latvia) Stadium Lokomotīve, Daugavpils

| Placing | Team / Rider name | Total | 1 | 2 | 3 | 4 | 5 | 6 | 7 | 8 | 9 | 10 | 11 | 12 | 13 | 14 | 15 | 16 | Pts | 17 | 18 | 19 | 20 |
| 1 | (Poland) Polonia Bydgoszcz | 34 | 0 | 0 | 1 | 1 | 2 | 5 | 7 | 9 | 12 | 15 | 15 | 16 | 16 | 19 | 22 | 25 | | 25 | 28 | 31 | 34 |
| 1 | (13) (Poland) Tomasz Gollob | 11 | | E | | | | | 2 | | 3 | | | | | | | 3 | 8 | | | | 3 |
| 1 | (14) (Poland) Piotr Protasiewicz | 11 | X | | | | | | | 2 | | 3 | | | | | 3 | | 8 | | | 3 |
| 1 | (15) (Sweden) Henrik Gustafsson | 11 | | | 1 | | | 3 | | | | | | 1 | | 3 | | | 8 | | 3 |
| 1 | (16) (Poland) Przemysław Tajchert | 1 | | | | E | 1 | | | | | | 0 | | 0 | | | | 1 | 0 |
| 1 | (20) - | 0 | | | | | | | | | | | | | | | | | 0 |
| 2 | (Russia) Lukoil Oktyabrsky | 32 | 0 | 2 | 4 | 7 | 9 | 9 | 9 | 12 | 12 | 14 | 17 | 20 | 22 | 24 | 25 | 25 | | 28 | 30 | 31 | 32 |
| 2 | (1) (Russia) Michail Starostin | 0 | | | | - | | | | - | | | | - | | | | E | 0 | - |
| 2 | (2) (Russia) Semyon Vlasov | 7 | | | 2 | | | | 0 | | | | 3 | | | | 1 | | 6 | | | | 1 |
| 2 | (3) (Russia) Talgat Galeyev | 7 | | 2 | | | | 0 | | | | 2 | | | 2 | | | | 6 | | | 1 |
| 2 | (4) (Russia) Renat Gafurov | 4 | F | | | | 2 | | | | 0 | | | | | 2 | | | 4 | | X |
| 2 | (17) (Poland) Sebastian Ułamek | 14 | | | | 3 | | | | 3 | | | | 3 | | | | | 9 | 3 | 2 |
| 3 | (Latvia) Lokomotiv Daugavpils | 32 | 1 | 2 | 5 | 7 | 10 | 11 | 14 | 15 | 17 | 18 | 19 | 22 | 23 | 23 | 25 | 26 | | 27 | 28 | 30 | 32 |
| 3 | (9) (Latvia) Andrejs Koroļevs | 10 | | | 3 | | 3 | | | | | 1 | | | | | | 1 | 8 | | | | 2 |
| 3 | (10) (Latvia) Aleksandr Biznya | 0 | | | | | | | | | | | | | | | | | 0 |
| 3 | (11) (Latvia) Vladimir Voronkov | 4 | | 1 | | | | | | 1 | | | 1 | | | 0 | | | 3 | | 1 |
| 3 | (12) (Latvia) Nikolay Kokin | 10 | 1 | | | | | | 3 | | | | | 3 | 1 | | | | 8 | | | 2 |
| 3 | (19) (Poland) Adam Skórnicki | 8 | | | | 2 | | 1 | | | 2 | | | | | | 2 | | 7 | 1 |
| 4 | (Germany) AC Landshut | 20 | 2 | 5 | 5 | 6 | 6 | 8 | 9 | 9 | 10 | 10 | 12 | 12 | 15 | 16 | 16 | 18 | | 20 | 20 | 20 | 20 |
| 4 | (5) (Germany) Robert Barth | 8 | 2 | | | | | 2 | | | | | 2 | | | | | 2 | 8 | | | | 0 |
| 4 | (6) (Poland) Adam Fajfer | 3 | | 3 | | | 0 | | | | | | | 0 | | | 0 | | 3 | | | 0 |
| 4 | (7) (Germany) Joachim Kugelmann | 5 | | | | 1 | | | 1 | | | 0 | | | | 1 | | | 3 | 2 |
| 4 | (8) (Poland) Paweł Duszyński | 4 | | | 0 | | | | | 0 | 1 | | | | 3 | | | | 4 | | 0 |
| 4 | (18) - | 0 | | | | | | | | | | | | | | | | | 0 |
| Placing | Team / Rider name | Total | 1 | 2 | 3 | 4 | 5 | 6 | 7 | 8 | 9 | 10 | 11 | 12 | 13 | 14 | 15 | 16 | Pts | 17 | 18 | 19 | 20 |

M - exclusion for exceeding two-minute time allowance • T - exclusion for touching the tapes • X - other exclusion • E - retired or mechanical failure • F - fell

Helmet colours were permanent for each team (Red, Blue, White and Yellow/Black). Colours in diagrams indicate gate positions:
| gate A – inside | gate B | gate C | gate D – outside |
