= 1997 Individual Speedway Latvian Championship =

The 1997 Latvian Individual Speedway Championship was the 23rd Latvian Individual Speedway Championship season. The final took place on 7 August 1997 in Daugavpils, Latvia. At the end of the season the champion was Andrejs Koroļevs.

== Results ==
- August 7, 1997
- LVA Daugavpils

| Placing | Rider | Total | 1 | 2 | 3 | 4 | 5 | 6 | 7 | 8 | 9 | 10 | 11 | 12 | 13 | 14 | 15 | 16 | 17 | 18 | 19 | 20 | Pts | Pos | 21 | 22 |
|---|---|---|---|---|---|---|---|---|---|---|---|---|---|---|---|---|---|---|---|---|---|---|---|---|---|---|
| 1 | (Latvia) (3) Andrejs Koroļevs | 15 | 3 | | | | | | 3 | | | | 3 | | | | 3 | | | | 3 | | 15 | 1 | | |
| 2 | (Latvia) (12) Vladimir Voronkov | 13 | | | 2 | | | | | 3 | | 3 | | | 3 | | | | | | 2 | | 13 | 2 | | |
| 3 | (Latvia) (13) Aleksandr Biznya | 12 | | | | 2 | 3 | | | | | | | 3 | | 3 | | | | | 1 | | 12 | 3 | | |
| 4 | (Poland) (4) Dariusz Baliński | 11 | 2 | | | | | | | 2 | | | | 1 | | | | 3 | | | | 3 | 11 | 4 | 3 | |
| 5 | (Poland) (10) Andrzej Szymański | 11 | | | 3 | | | 3 | | | | | | 0 | | | 2 | | 3 | | | | 11 | 5 | 2 | |
| 6 | (Poland) (14) Robert Mikołajczak | 11 | | | | 3 | | 2 | | | | | 2 | | 2 | | | | | | | 2 | 11 | 6 | 1 | |
| 7 | (Ukraine) (7) Igor Marko | 10 | | 2 | | | | | 2 | | | | | 2 | 1 | | | | | 3 | | | 10 | 7 | | |
| 8 | (Latvia) (5) Nikolay Kokin | 7 | | 3 | | | 2 | | | | | F | | | | | 1 | | | | | 1 | 7 | 8 | | |
| 9 | (Poland) (6) Dariusz Łowicki | 7 | | 1 | | | | 1 | | | 3 | | | | | | | 2 | | | 0 | | 7 | 9 | | |
| 10 | (Ukraine) (16) Aleksandr Lyatosinsky | 6 | | | | 1 | | | | 1 | 2 | | | | | | 0 | | | 2 | | | 6 | 10 | | |
| 11 | (Belarus) (1) Viktor Sidorenko | 4 | E | | | | 1 | | | | 1 | | | | 0 | | | | 2 | | | | 4 | 11 | | |
| 12 | (Latvia) (15) Vitaly Biznya | 4 | | | | 0 | | | 1 | | | 2 | | | | | | 1 | 0 | | | | 4 | 12 | | |
| 13 | (Belarus) (2) Leonid Taranov | 4 | 1 | | | | | 0 | | | | 1 | | | | 2 | | | | 0 | | | 4 | 13 | | |
| 14 | (Latvia) (9) Maksim Andreev | 3 | | | 1 | | F | | | | | | 1 | | | | | 0 | | 1 | | | 3 | 14 | | |
| 15 | (Ukraine) (8) Pyotr Velesyk | 2 | | 0 | | | | | | 0 | | | E | | | 1 | | | 1 | | | | 2 | 15 | | |
| 16 | (Ukraine) (11) Vladimir Bobalo | 0 | | | 0 | | | | 0 | | 0 | | | | | 0 | | | | | | 0 | 0 | 16 | | |
| Placing | Rider | Total | 1 | 2 | 3 | 4 | 5 | 6 | 7 | 8 | 9 | 10 | 11 | 12 | 13 | 14 | 15 | 16 | 17 | 18 | 19 | 20 | Pts | Pos | 21 | 22 |

m - exclusion for exceeding two minute time allowance • t - exclusion for touching the tapes • x - other exclusion • e - retired or mechanical failure • f - fell • ns - non-starter • nc - non-classify

| gate A - inside | gate B | gate C | gate D - outside |
