= 2014 Speedway European Championship finals =

The 2014 Speedway European Championship finals take place from 6 July to 19 September 2014.

== Round 1 ==
- 6 July 2014
- GER Güstrow
- Speedway Stadion Güstrow (Length: 298m)
- References

Placing	Rider	Total	1	2	3	4	5	6	7	8	9	10	11	12	13	14	15	16	17	18	19	20	Pts	Pos	21	22
Gold medal	(Denmark) (11) Nicki Pedersen	11			2				2		3					3						1	11	Gold medal		3
Silver medal	(Denmark) (7) Peter Kildemand	9		0					3					3	0					3			9	Silver medal	2	2
Bronze medal	(Poland) (6) Janusz Kołodziej	13		3				3			2							2			3		13	Bronze medal		1
4.	(Poland) (4) Tomasz Gollob	9	3							1				1				1				3	9	4.	3	0
5.	(Russia) (12) Emil Sayfutdinov	11			1					3		2			3						2		11	5.	1	
6.	(Sweden) (15) Andreas Jonsson	9				1			1			1						3	3				9	6.	0	
7.	(Poland) (13) Adrian Miedziński	9				3	2							2		2					ns		9	7.		
8.	(Latvia) (2) Maksims Bogdanovs	8	2					1				3				1				1			8	8.		
9.	(Latvia) (14) Andrzej Lebiediew	10				2		2					2		1							3	10	9.		
10.	(Slovakia) (1) Martin Vaculík	8	1				1				1				2				3				8	10.		
11.	(Denmark) (5) Kenni Larsen	6		1			0					0					3					2	6	11.		
12.	(Germany) (9) Martin Smolinski	5			0		3						0					0		2			5	12.		
13.	(Sweden) (10) Jonas Davidsson	5			3			0						0			2		0				5	13.		
14.	(Germany) (3) Christian Hefenbrock	4	0						0				3				d				1		4	14.		
15.	(Poland) (8) Patryk Dudek	4		2						0			1			0			1				4	15.		
16.	(Croatia) (16) Jurica Pavlic	3								2	0						1			0t			3	16.		
17.	(Germany) (16) Kai Huckenbeck	0				0																	0	17.		
18.	(Germany) (-) Tobias Busch	0																					0	18.		
Placing	Rider	Total	1	2	3	4	5	6	7	8	9	10	11	12	13	14	15	16	17	18	19	20	Pts	Pos	21	22

m - exclusion for exceeding two minute time allowance • t - exclusion for touching the tapes • x - other exclusion • e - retired or mechanical failure • f - fell • ns - non-starter • nc - non-classify

gate A - inside	gate B	gate C	gate D - outside

== Round 2 ==
- 20 July 2014
- RUS Tolyatti
- Mega-Lada Stadium (Length: 353m)

== Round 3 ==
- 9 August 2014
- DEN Holsted
- Moldow Arena (Length: 300m)

== Round 4 ==
- 19 September 2014
- POL Częstochowa
- Częstochowa Arena (Length: 368m)

== See also ==
- Motorcycle Speedway
- 2014 Speedway European Championship
