= 2003 Individual Speedway Latvian Championship =

The 2003 Latvian Individual Speedway Championship was the 29th Latvian Individual Speedway Championship season. The final took in Polska, Latvia.

== Results ==
- October 12, 2003
- LVA Daugavpils

Placing	Rider	Total	1	2	3	4	5	6	7	8	9	10	11	12	13	14	15	16	17	18	19	20	Pts	Pos	21	22
1	(Poland) (3) Robert Mikołajczak	13	3						3				2				2				3		13	1	2	
2	(Latvia) (13) Kjasts Puodžuks	11				3	2							3		2					1		11	2	3	
3	(Latvia) (9) Aleksandr Biznya	13			3		3						3					3		1			13	3	1	
4	(Poland) (2) Piotr Rembas	12	2					3				1				3				3			12	4		
5	(Latvia) (12) Denis Popovich	10			2					2		3			3						0		10	5		
6	(Latvia) (5) Leonid Paura	10		1			1					2					3					3	10	6	0	
7	(Poland) (6) Mariusz Fierlej	9		2				2			3							E			2		9	7		
8	(Sweden) (4) Emil Lindqvist	9	1							3				2				1				2	9	8		
9	(Russia) (7) Georgy Ishutin	8		3					1					0	2					2			8	9		
10	(Latvia) (15) Nikolay Kokin	8				2			2			E						2	2				8	10		
11	(Poland) (8) Tomasz Zywertowski	6		0						1			1			1			3				6	11		
12	(Latvia) (10) Aleksandr Ivanov	4			F			1						1			1		1				4	12		
13	(Latvia) (16) Aleksandr Dovzhenko	3				1				0	2						0			0			3	13		
14	(Finland) (11) Tommy Björklin	3			1				0		1					0						1	3	14		
15	(Sweden) (1) Robert Pettersson	1	E				0				0				1				0				1	15		
16	(Sweden) (14) David Hillborg	0				0		E					0		F							0	0	16		
Placing	Rider	Total	1	2	3	4	5	6	7	8	9	10	11	12	13	14	15	16	17	18	19	20	Pts	Pos	21	22

m - exclusion for exceeding two minute time allowance • t - exclusion for touching the tapes • x - other exclusion • e - retired or mechanical failure • f - fell • ns - non-starter • nc - non-classify

gate A - inside	gate B	gate C	gate D - outside
