= Latvian Individual Speedway Championship =

Latvian speedway event

- Sport: Motorcycle speedway
- Founded: 1965
- Most titles: Andrejs Koroļevs & Andžejs Ļebedevs (5)

The Latvian Individual Speedway Championship (Latvian: Latvijas atklātais spīdveja čempionāts) is an annual speedway event held since 1965 to determine the champion rider of Latvia.

Latvian riders also competed in the Soviet Union Individual Speedway Championship until the Restoration of independence in 1991.

== Previous winners ==
Year	Venue	Winners	2nd place	3rd place
1965	Daugavpils	Reino Viidas (Estonia)	Anatoly Petrovsky	Petr Petkov
1966	Daugavpils	Anatoly Petrovsky	Anatoly Kuzmin	Vadim Volsky
1970	Daugavpils	Anatoly Petrovsky	Anatoly Kuzmin	Vadim Volsky
1976	Riga	Anatoly Kuzmin	Sergey Dovzhenko	Vadim Volsky
1977	Riga	Anatoly Kuzmin	Sergey Dovzhenko	Ivan Rybnikov
1978	Daugavpils	Valery Kharitonov	Vladimir Tkachuk	Sergey Danu
1979	Daugavpils	Ivan Rybnikov	Viktor Blyakha	Oleg Isaev
1980	Daugavpils	Sergey Dovzhenko	Guntis Birzaks	Arvid Vitols
1982	Riga	Vladimir Tkachuk	Vladimir Rybnikov	Sergey Danu
1983	Riga	Oleg Isaev	Vladimir Tkachuk	Guntis Birzaks
1984	Riga	Vladimir Rybnikov	Guntis Birzaks	Ayvar Zemzhans
1985	Daugavpils / Riga	Vladimir Rybnikov	Vasily Matveev	Valery Sokolov
1986	Riga	Sergey Danu	Valery Sokolov	Nikolajs Kokins
1987	Daugavpils	Vladimir Rybnikov	Nikolajs Kokins	Yury Brauceys
1988	Riga	Valery Sokolov	Ayvar Zemzhans	Normund Dobums
1990	Riga	Nikolajs Kokins	Normund Dobums	Vitaly Biznya
1991	Riga	Andrejs Koroļevs	Yury Brauceys	Vladimirs Voronkovs
1992	Daugavpils / Riga	Nikolajs Kokins	Andrejs Koroļevs	Normund Dobums
1993	Daugavpils / Riga	Vladimirs Voronkovs	Andrejs Koroļevs	Nikolajs Kokins
1994	Riga / Daugavpils	Nikolajs Kokins	Vladimirs Voronkovs	Andrejs Koroļevs
1995	Daugavpils	Andrejs Koroļevs	Vladimirs Voronkovs	Nikolajs Kokins
1997	Daugavpils	Andrejs Koroļevs	Vladimirs Voronkovs	Aleksandrs Biznia
1998	Daugavpils	Vladimirs Voronkovs	Nikolajs Kokins	Maksim Andreyev
1999	Daugavpils	Adam Skórnicki (Poland)	Nikolajs Kokins	Robert Mikołajczak (Poland)
2000	Daugavpils	Andrejs Koroļevs	Aleksandr Biznya	Nikolajs Kokins
2001	Daugavpils	Andrejs Koroļevs	Piotr Markuszewski (Poland)	Nikolajs Kokins
2003	Daugavpils	Robert Mikołajczak (Poland)	Kjasts Puodžuks	Aleksandrs Biznia
2004	Daugavpils	Kjasts Puodžuks	Christian Hefenbrock (Germany)	Krzysztof Stojanowski (Poland)
2005	Daugavpils	Sławomir Dudek (Poland)	Kjasts Puodžuks	Maksims Bogdanovs
2006	Daugavpils	Marcin Jędrzejewski (Poland)	Kjasts Puodžuks	Andrejs Koroļevs
2007	Daugavpils	Kjasts Puodžuks	Maksims Bogdanovs	Grigory Laguta (Russia)
2008	Daugavpils	Grigory Laguta (Russia)	Piotr Świst (Poland)	Maksims Bogdanovs
2010	Daugavpils	Grigory Laguta (Russia)	Kjasts Puodžuks	Artem Laguta (Russia)
2011	Daugavpils	Grigory Laguta (Russia)	Maksims Bogdanovs	Kjasts Puodžuks
2012	Daugavpils	Maksims Bogdanovs	Mirosław Jabłoński (Poland)	Kjasts Puodžuks
2013	Daugavpils	Andžejs Ļebedevs	Maksims Bogdanovs	Timo Lahti (Finland)
2014	Daugavpils	Grigory Laguta (Russia)	Denis Gizatullin (Russia)	Michał Szczepaniak (Poland)
2015	Daugavpils	Kjasts Puodžuks	Denis Gizatullin (Poland)	Andžejs Ļebedevs
2017	Daugavpils	Maksim Bogdanov	Kjasts Puodžuks	Oļegs Mihailovs
2018	Daugavpils	Jevgeņijs Kostigovs	Artiom Trofimow	Oļegs Mihailovs
2019	Daugavpils	Andžejs Ļebedevs	Timo Lahti (Finland)	Andrey Kudriashov (Russia)
2020	Daugavpils	Andrey Kudriashov (Russia)	Oļegs Mihailovs	Daniił Kołodinski
2022	Daugavpils	Kjasts Puodžuks	Jevgeņijs Kostigovs	Daniił Kołodinski
2023	Daugavpils	Andžejs Ļebedevs	Jakub Jamróg (Poland)	Kjasts Puodžuks
2024	Daugavpils	Andžejs Ļebedevs	Daniił Kołodinski	Nazar Parnitskyi (Ukraine)
2025	Daugavpils	Andžejs Ļebedevs	Jakub Jamróg (Poland)	Jevgeņijs Kostigovs
2026	Daugavpils	Jevgeņijs Kostigovs	Francis Gusts	Patryk Wojdyło (Poland)

Championships not held - 1967–1969, 1971–1975, 1981, 1989, 1996, 2002, 2009, 2016, 2021
