= 2005 European Pairs Speedway Championship =

Motorcycle racing competition

Seasons
- ← 2004 2006 →

The 2005 European Pairs Speedway Championship was the second edition of the European Pairs Speedway Championship. The final was held in Gdańsk, Poland on 12 June. Poland won their first title.

== Semifinal 1 ==
- (Czech Republic) Slaný
- May 7

Placing	Pair / Rider Name	Total	1	2	3	4	5	6	7	8	9	10	11	12	13	14	15	16	17	18	19	20	21
1	Czech Republic	26							9							17							26
1	(1) Bohumil Brhel	12	3			3				3			2				-			1
1	(2) Aleš Dryml, Jr.	10	1			-				2			1				3			3
1	(15) Lukáš Dryml	4				2											2
2	Slovenia	25							10							17							25
2	(11) Matej Žagar	18			3				3				3		3			3					3
2	(12) Izak Šantej	7			2				2				0		1			1					1
2	(20) Aleš Kraljič	0
3	Latvia	21							9							17							21
3	(7) Kasts Podžuks	8		1				2			3					2				0			0
3	(8) Andrejs Koroļevs	13		3				3			0					3				2			2
3	(18) -	0
4	Russia	20							5							13							20
4	(3) Semion Vlasov	7	-				2				-			2				-			3
4	(4) Denis Gizatullin	5	0				1				2			-				0			2
4	(16) Renat Gafurov	8	2								1			3				2
5	Netherlands	16							5							8							16
5	(5) Jannick de Jong	13		2			3			T					2				3			3
5	(6) Rene van der Welle	2		0			0			-					-				2			-
5	(17) Kaj de Jong	1								1					0							0
6	Czech Republic B	11							2							7							11
6	(9) Jan Hlacina	2			0			0				1		0			0					1
6	(10) Tomas Suchanek	9			1			1				3		1			1					2
6	(19) -	0
7	Ukraine	7							2							5							7
7	(13) Petr Velesik	1				1			E			X				-			-		-
7	(14) Sergey Senko	6				0			1			2				1			1		1
7	(21) -	0
Placing	Pair / Rider Name	Total	1	2	3	4	5	6	7	8	9	10	11	12	13	14	15	16	17	18	19	20	21

m - exclusion for exceeding two minute time allowance • t - exclusion for touching the tapes • x - other exclusion • e - retired or mechanical failure • f - fell
ns - non-starter • nc - non-classify

gate A - inside	gate B	gate C	gate D - outside

== Semifinal 2 ==
- (Slovenia) Krško
- May 8

- event was canceled

== Final ==
- (Poland) Gdańsk
- June 12

Placing	Pair / Rider Name	Total	1	2	3	4	5	6	7	8	9	10	11	12	13	14	15	16	17	18	19	20	21
1	Poland	29							10							19							29
1	(1) Robert Kościecha	12	2			2				3			2				3			-
1	(2) Krzysztof Kasprzak	13	3			3				1			3				-			3
1	(15) Janusz Kołodziej	4															2			2
2	Czech Republic	27							10							17							27
2	(5) Bohumil Brhel	13		2			2			2					2				2			3
2	(6) Aleš Dryml, Jr.	14		3			3			0					3				3			2
2	(17) Lukáš Dryml	0
3	Slovenia	20							6							14							20
3	(13) Izak Šantej	6				0			2			2				F			0		2
3	(14) Matej Žagar	14				1			3			3				3			1		3
3	(21) -	0
4	Hungary	15							7							13							15
4	(9) Sandor Tihanyi	9			3			1				1		3			1					0
4	(10) Norbert Magosi	6			0			3				0		2			0					1
4	(19) -	0
5	Germany	14							2							8							14
5	(3) Christian Hefenbrock	7	0				1				2			1				2			1
5	(4) Mathias Schultz	7	1				0				3			0				3			0
5	(16) Tobias Kroner	0
6	Italy	10							3							6							10
6	(7) Emiliano Sanchez	6		1				2			1					2				-			-
6	(8) Andrea Maida	3		0				-			-					T				0			3
6	(18) Simone Terenzani	1						0			0									1
7	Latvia	10							4							6							10
7	(11) Andrejs Koroļevs	2			1				1				E		-			-					-
7	(12) Kjasts Puodžuks	5			2				0				1		0			1					1
7	(20) Nikolay Kokin	3													1			F					2
Placing	Pair / Rider Name	Total	1	2	3	4	5	6	7	8	9	10	11	12	13	14	15	16	17	18	19	20	21

m - exclusion for exceeding two minute time allowance • t - exclusion for touching the tapes • x - other exclusion • e - retired or mechanical failure • f - fell
ns - non-starter • nc - non-classify

gate A - inside	gate B	gate C	gate D - outside

== See also ==
- 2005 Individual Speedway European Championship
