= 1990 Individual Speedway Latvian Championship =

1990 Latvian Individual Speedway Championship

Seasons
- ← 1989 1991 →

The 1990 Latvian Individual Speedway Championship was the 16th Latvian Individual Speedway Championship season. The final took place on 7 October 1990 in Riga, Latvia. The champion was Nikolajs Kokins.

== Final ==
- October 7, 1990
- LVA Riga

Placing	Rider	Total	1	2	3	4	5	6	7	8	9	10	11	12	13	14	15	16	17	18	19	20	Pts	Pos	21	22
1	(Ukraine) (14) Anatoly Klimantov	15				3		3					3		3							3	15	1		
2	(Poland) (13) Krzysztof Kuczwalski	14				2	3							3		3					3		14	2		
3	(Latvia) (1) Nikolay Kokin	13	3				2				3				2				3				13	3		
4	(Poland) (16) Piotr Baron	11				E				3	2						3			3			11	4		
5	(Latvia) (2) Normund Dobums	10	2					2				2				2				2			10	5		
6	(Poland) (15) Mariusz Strzelecki	7				1			2			1						2	1				7	6		
7	(Latvia) (9) Vitaly Biznya	7			3		1						2					1		F			7	7		
8	(Estonia) (4) Vyacheslav Potapenko	7	F							1				2				3				1	7	8		
9	(Latvia) (5) Ayvar Zemzhans	7		2			0					3					2					0	7	9		
10	(Latvia) (3) Oleg Kolodinsky	6	E						3				1				0				2		6	10		
11	(Poland) (8) Stefan Tietz	6		1						2			0			1			2				6	11		
12	(Latvia) (6) Shakir Agasiev	5		3				1			1							0			0		5	12		
13	(Latvia) (12) Guntis Dobums	3			2					0		0			0						1		3	13		
14	(Latvia) (7) Artur Yudin	3		0					1					0	1					1			3	14		
15	(Latvia) (10) Andris Matisans	3			1			0						1			1		0				3	15		
16	(Latvia) (11) Aleksandr Biznya	2			X				0		-					0						2	2	16		
R1	(Ukraine) (R1) Pyotr Fedyk	0									0												0	R1		
Placing	Rider	Total	1	2	3	4	5	6	7	8	9	10	11	12	13	14	15	16	17	18	19	20	Pts	Pos	21	22

m - exclusion for exceeding two minute time allowance • t - exclusion for touching the tapes • x - other exclusion • e - retired or mechanical failure • f - fell • ns - non-starter • nc - non-classify

gate A - inside	gate B	gate C	gate D - outside
