= 1998 Individual Speedway Latvian Championship =

The 1998 Latvian Individual Speedway Championship was the 24th Latvian Individual Speedway Championship season. The final took place on 16 August 1998 in Daugavpils, Latvia. The champion at the end of the season was Vladimir Voronkov.

== Results ==
- August 16, 1998
- LVA Daugavpils

Placing	Rider	Total	1	2	3	4	5	6	7	8	9	10	11	12	13	14	15	16	17	18	19	20	Pts	Pos	21	22
1	(Latvia) (11) Vladimir Voronkov	14			3				2		3					3						3	14	1		
2	(Latvia) (5) Nikolay Kokin	13		3			3					3					3					1	13	2		
3	(Latvia) (1) Maksim Andreev	12	3				2				2				2				3				12	3		
4	(Russia) (6) Grigory Kharchenko	11		2				3			1							3			2		11	4		
5	(Russia) (7) Roman Kashirin	10		X					1					3	3					3			10	5		
6	(Latvia) (13) Aleksandr Biznya	9				3	1							2		F					3		9	6		
7	(Russia) (15) Vladimir Dubinin	9				1			3			2						2	1				9	7		
8	(Ukraine) (14) Aleksandr Lyatosinsky	9				2		2					2		1							2	9	8		
9	(Russia) (9) Igor Stolyarov	7			2		0						3					F		2			7	9		
10	(Russia) (4) Igor Dubinin	7	2							3				1				1				0	7	10		
11	(Latvia) (8) Denis Popovich	6		E						2			E			2			2				6	11		
12	(Latvia) (16) Yevgeny Rachicky	3				E				1	0						1			1			3	12		
13	(Russia) (10) Ilya Bondarenko	2			1			1						F			NS		NS				2	13		
14	(Russia) (2) Marat Malikov	0	F					E				F				NS				NS			0	14		
15	(Russia) (3) Pavel Bondarenko	0	F						-				-				-				-		0	15		
16	(Latvia) (12) Vitaly Biznya	0			E					-		NS			NS						NS		0	16		
R1	(Latvia) (R1) Aleksandr Boltruk	3							F	0			X				2				1		3	R1		
Placing	Rider	Total	1	2	3	4	5	6	7	8	9	10	11	12	13	14	15	16	17	18	19	20	Pts	Pos	21	22

m - exclusion for exceeding two minute time allowance • t - exclusion for touching the tapes • x - other exclusion • e - retired or mechanical failure • f - fell • ns - non-starter • nc - non-classify

gate A - inside	gate B	gate C	gate D - outside
