= 1991 Individual Speedway Latvian Championship =

1991 Latvian Individual Speedway Championship

Seasons
- ← 1990 1992 →

The 1991 Individual Latvian Championship was the 17th Latvian Individual Speedway Championship season. The final took place on 10 August 1991 in Riga, Latvia. The defending champion was Andrejs Koroļevs.

== Final ==
- 10 August 1991
- LVA Riga

Placing	Rider	Total	1	2	3	4	5	6	7	8	9	10	11	12	13	14	15	16	17	18	19	20	Pts	Pos	21	22
1	(Latvia) (7) Andrejs Koroļevs	14		3					3					3	2					3			14	1		
2	(Latvia) (3) Yury Brauceys	13	2						2				3				3				3		13	2	3	
3	(Latvia) (8) Vladimir Voronkov	13		2						3			2			3			3				13	3	2	
4	(Latvia) (14) Valery Sokolov	13				3		3					1		3							3	13	4	1	
5	(Latvia) (2) Oleg Budko	12	3					2				3				2				2			12	5		
6	(Latvia) (4) Nikolay Kokin	10	1							2				2				3				2	10	6		
7	(Latvia) (9) Ayvar Boris	8			3		3						0					2		0			8	7		
8	(Latvia) (11) Normund Dobums	6			2				1		3					0						X	6	8		
9	(Latvia) (16) Aleksandr Biznya	6				2				1	0						2			1			6	9		
10	(Latvia) (12) Vladimir Tkachuk	5			F					-		2			1						2		5	10		
11	(Latvia) (13) Oleg Koschinsky	5				0	2							1		1					1		5	11		
12	(Latvia) (1) Guntis Dobums	4	F				-				2				0				2				4	12		
13	(Latvia) (5) Vitaly Biznya	4		1			1					1					0					1	4	13		
14	(Latvia) (10) Ayvar Zemzhans	2			1			1						-			-		-				2	14		
15	(Latvia) (6) Artur Yudin	2		0				0			1							1			0		2	15		
16	(Latvia) (15) Yanis Dishlers	1				1			0			E						NS	NS				1	16		
R1	(Latvia) (R1) Agris Bezmers	2					0			0							1		1				2	R1		
Placing	Rider	Total	1	2	3	4	5	6	7	8	9	10	11	12	13	14	15	16	17	18	19	20	Pts	Pos	21	22

m - exclusion for exceeding two minute time allowance • t - exclusion for touching the tapes • x - other exclusion • e - retired or mechanical failure • f - fell • ns - non-starter • nc - non-classify

gate A - inside	gate B	gate C	gate D - outside
