= Stadium Lokomotīve =

Stadium in Daugavpils, Latvia

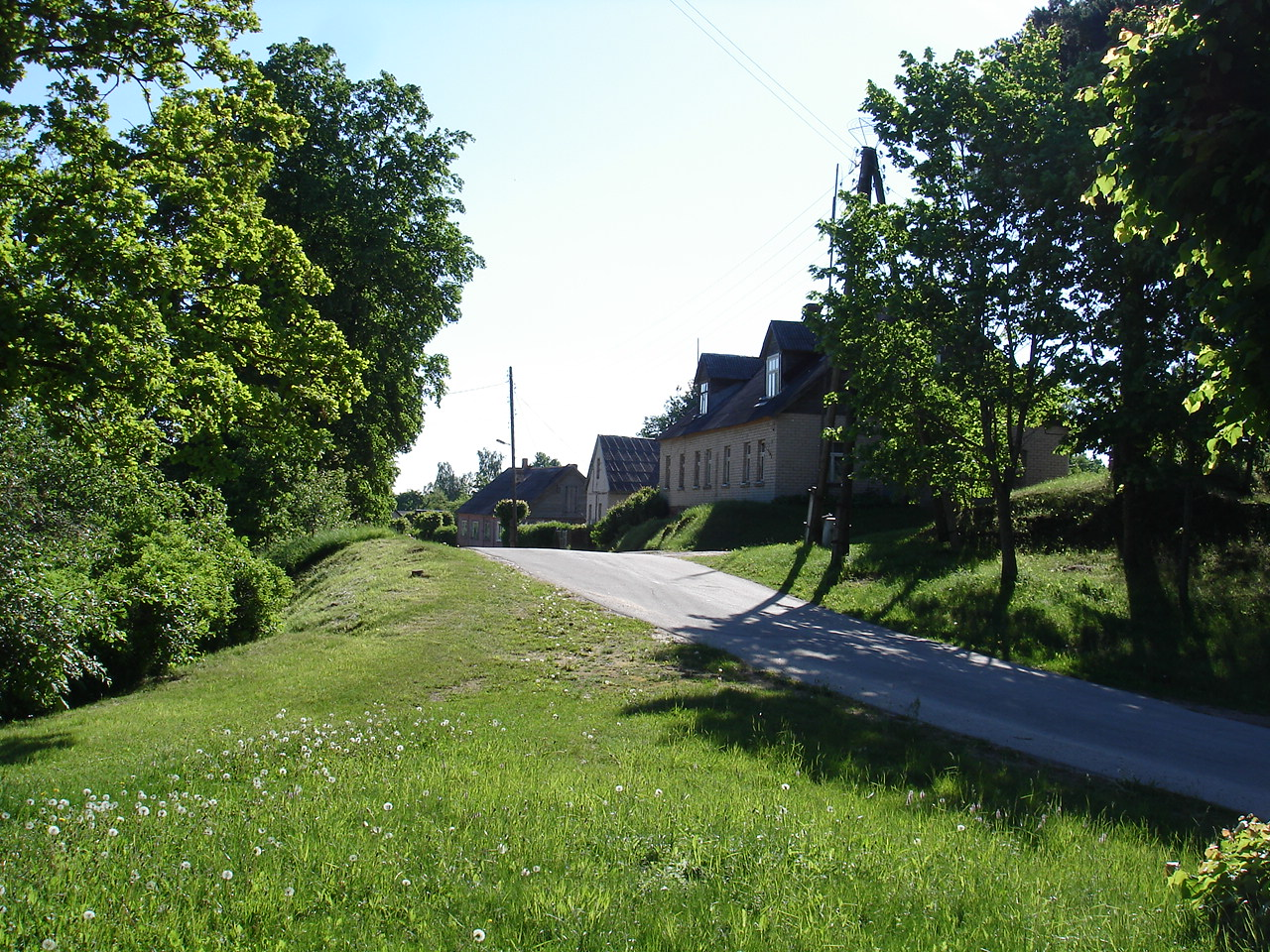
- Puškina iela entrance on the right
- Location: Inzinieru 9a 21, Daugavpils, LV-5404, Latvia
- Coordinates: 55°52′44″N 26°32′46″E
- Capacity: 10,000
- Operator: Motorcycle speedway
- Opened: 1963
- Length: 373 m (0.232 mi)
- Race lap record: 66.01 sec (Grigory Laguta, 2010)

The Stadium Lokomotīve formerly the Latvijas Spīdveja Centrs is a 10,000 capacity motorcycle speedway stadium in the central part of Daugavpils, Latvia.

== History ==
The stadium is a regular venue for the World Championship round known as the Speedway Grand Prix of Latvia.

The speedway track opened on 17 November 1963 and is 373 metres in size. The stadium hosts the leading Latvian motorcycle speedway team known as Lokomotiv Daugavpils, who race in the Polish leagues.

The track record of 66.01 sec was set by Grigory Laguta on 30 May 2010.

== Track record timeline (373m) ==
Date	Time	Rider
12 May 1996	70.0	S. Robson
23 May 1996	69.8	V. Voronkov
30 May 2001	69.0	Tomasz Bajerski
23 May 2004	68.8	Adrian Miedziński
13 August 2006	68.60	Grigory Laguta
1 May 2008	68.44	K. Harris
31 May 2008	68.43	Leigh Adams
13 June 2008	68.22	Artur Mroczka
13 June 2008	67.74	Grigory Laguta
4 July 2009	67.64	Maksims Bogdanovs
4 July 2009	66.86	Y.Pavlich
1 August 2009	66.68	Greg Hancock
2 May 2010	66.65	Artem Laguta
30 May 2010	66.01	Grigory Laguta

== See also ==
- Speedway Grand Prix of Latvia
