= Pavel Bondarenko =

Ukrainian serial killer (born 1981)

- Born: Pavel Vladimirovich Bondarenko; 1981 (age 44–45); Sevastopol, Ukrainian SSR
- Other name: "The Sevastopol Maniac"
- Convictions: Murder x5 Rape x3 Attempted rape Sexual assault Theft x2
- Penalty: Life imprisonment (2017); 13 years imprisonment (2022)

Details
- Victims: 5+
- Span of crimes: 2007–2015
- Country: Ukraine (de jure); Russia (de facto)
- State: Sevastopol
- Date apprehended: 21 January 2016

Pavel Vladimirovich Bondarenko (Russian: Павел Владимирович Бондаренко), known as The Sevastopol Maniac (Russian: Севастопольский маньяк), is a Ukrainian serial killer and rapist who raped and murdered at least five teenage girls and young women in the city of Sevastopol from 2007 to 2015. He was convicted of these crimes and sentenced to life imprisonment in 2017.

Bondarenko's case is unique due to several factors related to the Russo-Ukrainian War, such as the Russian authorities taking over the case following the occupation of Crimea. His life term was also the first, and currently only known, such sentence to be handed down in Sevastopol ever since the city came under Russian jurisdiction.

== Early life ==
Little is known about Bondarenko's early life. Born in 1981 in Sevastopol, he was an introverted and eccentric child in contrast with his brother, who was popular at school and had many girlfriends. After graduation, Bondarenko married a local woman and had four children with her.

In the 2000s, he learned a number of specialties in the construction industry, from which he managed to make a living by doing European-style renovations. Relatives, friends and acquaintances all characterized him in a positive manner, he did not exhibit any concerning behavior or have a criminal record.

== Murders ==
When carrying out the murders, Bondarenko demonstrated a particular modus operandi - once he attacked his victim, he would threaten them with physical violence, after which he would rape and strangle them. After committing each murder, he stole money and jewelry from the victim, some of which he would give to his wife.

The first murder was committed on the night of 1 July 2007, with the victim being a female acquaintance he met on Shabalina Street and was intoxicated. During a conversation with the woman, Bondarenko persuaded her to let him walk her home. After making sure that there were no pedestrians around, he beat, raped and strangled her. At the time, Bondarenko was never considered a suspect, and the murder remained a cold case until he was linked to it years later.

The second murder was committed in the late evening of 17 January 2009 on Admiral Markov Street, with the victim being a 60-year-old pensioner whom he beat, raped and strangled. A silver chain and a cellphone were stolen from the victim. Bondareko later claimed that he stripped off the victim's clothing and dragged her to a nearby pit, before fleeing in the direction of Matrosa Koshki Street.

A year later, on 16 December 2010, Bondarenko was returning home late at night to his home on Prospekt Pobedy, when he came across a 26-year-old accountant whom he attacked, raped and strangled to death. Her nude body was then left in a puddle. At the time of her death, the victim was returning home from a date with a man and was only 150 meters away from her house on General Melnik Street.

On 1 February 2011, Bondarenko was riding a cab with a female passenger, noticing that she was wearing jewelry. He got out on Prospekt Pobedy and stalked her until she reached Akmolinskaya Street. After making sure that there was nobody around, he attacked the woman, threw her to the ground and attempted to rape and kill her. The victim resisted him fiercely and bit his hand, allowing her time to escape. Bondarenko fled almost immediately, fearing that he would be caught if he stayed around.

Following the Russian annexation of Crimea, Bondarenko is known to have committed two murders. The first of these occurred on 23 December 2014 in the Victory Park, where he raped a 20-year-old red-haired student at gunpoint and then strangled her to death. The final known murder occurred on 1 September 2015, when he raped and strangled a 37-year-old woman outside a house on Khrustaleva Street.

== Investigation and arrest ==
Initially, the investigation into Bondareko's crimes was handled by Ukrainian law enforcement agencies. In 2009, following the murder of the 60-year-old pensioner, Bondarenko was temporarily arrested after his blood was found on the victim's pants — however, for reasons unknown, the authorities did not conduct a DNA test and later released him due to lack of evidence.

Following the annexation of Crimea, the Russian authorities established an investigative department in Sevastopol and started working to solve the murders. After the last murder, geneticists conducted a DNA exam and linked Bondareko to the 2009 murder. Further exams linked him to two of the other murders. With this evidence, Bondarenko was arrested in the yard of his house on 21 January 2016, with the assistance of the OMON "Berkut" Special Unit. Initially, his wife came to his defense and threatened to call the police, but when she realized that the men were actually police officers, she broke down in tears.

In a press release to the media, investigators explained that a statute in the Criminal Code of Russia stipulated that there should be two months of a "preliminary investigation" that tasked that investigators should attempt to identify the perpetrator of a certain crime, which led to them catching Bondarenko. Allegedly, there was no such equivalent in the Ukrainian Criminal Code, leading to the investigation being delayed indefinitely.

=== Confession ===
After his arrest, Bondarenko confessed to committing four of the murders, writing everything down on paper. In the subsequent interrogations, he claimed to have no set criteria when choosing his victims, but that he was always drunk when committing the crimes and that it was always in a deserted area in the late hours of the day.

His lawyer then filed a request for a forensic medical examination, which was granted. Once he was found to be sane to stand trial, Bondarenko retracted his confession and professed his innocence, despite showing the murder scenes early on and accurately describing the crime scenes with knowledge only the killer could have had.

== Trial and sentence ==
In total, Bondarenko was eventually charged with four counts of murder and rape; three counts of rape and one count of attempted rape; sexual assault, and two counts of theft. His trial began in February 2017, and lasted almost nine months, with more than 50 witnesses being questioned and hundreds pieces of evidence being presented. In total, the case eventually amounted to 40 volumes.

On 15 December 2017, Bondarenko was found guilty on all charges, for which the Sevastopol City Court imposed a life sentence on him. He filed an appeal to the Supreme Court of Russia, which subsequently rejected it and finalized his sentence.

Even after his conviction, Bondarenko refused to apologize and insisted that he was innocent. In response, the mother of one of his victims later stated in an interview with the media that if the law allowed it, he should have been sentenced to death.

=== Link to first murder ===
In 2022, the Sevastopol Investigative Department used DNA from Bondarenko to link him to his first known murder in 2007. As a consequence, he was transferred from the penal colony and returned to Sevastopol to participate in an investigative experiment. On 7 November 2022, he was found guilty of committing this murder and given an additional 13 years imprisonment, which are to be served concurrently with his life sentence.

== See also ==
- List of serial killers by country
