= Lokomotiv Daugavpils =

Latvian motorcycle speedway team

Lokomotīve Daugavpils
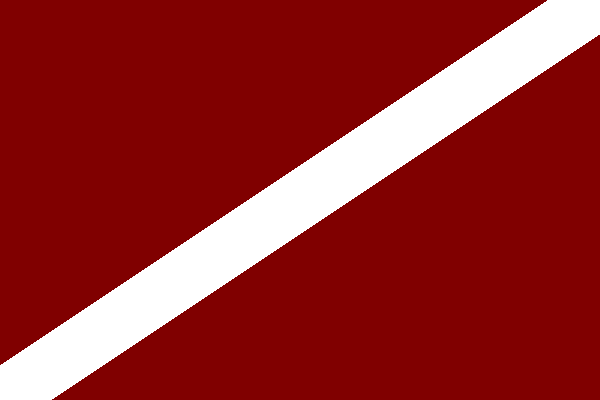

Club information
- Track address: Lokomotiv Stadium; Jelgavas iela 53; LV-5404 Daugavpils
- Country: Latvia
- Founded: 1963
- Team manager: Nikolajs Kokins
- League: Polish 2. Liga
- Website: Official website

Club facts
- Track size: 373 m
- Track record time: 66.65
- Track record date: 2010-05-02
- Track record holder: Grigory Laguta

Major team honours
1. Liga	2015, 2016
Soviet Union silver medal	1970, 1971
Russian bronze medal	1995, 1996, 2001, 2002

Lokomotīve Daugavpils, also known as Lokomotiv Daugavpils, is a Latvian motorcycle speedway team based in Daugavpils who race in the Polish Speedway Second League (2. Liga).

== Stadium ==
Stadium Lokomotīve (former name Spīdveja centrs) is located at Jelgavas iela 54, Daugavpils. Its capacity is 10,000 seats. The track is 373 metres long and has a granite surface. The track record was set by Grigory Laguta (66.01 sec on 30 May 2010).

== History ==
Founded in 1963, the club began league speedway in 1964, as part of the Soviet Union Championship. They won the silver medal in 1970 and 1971. Following the dissolution of the Soviet Union the team continued to race in the Russian Team Speedway Championship, due to the lack of a team competition in Latvia. They won the bronze medal four times in 1995, 1996, 2001 and 2002. The team also competed in the Finnish league from 1994 to 2002.

The team withdrew from the Russian leagues to join the Polish leagues and twice won the 1. Liga in 2015 and 2016 but were not promoted to the Ekstraliga, which was restricted to Polish clubs.

During the 2020 Polish speedway season the club were relegated to 2. Liga.

== Teams ==
=== 2023 team ===
- (Australia) Nick Morris
- (Sweden) Gustav Grahn
- (Denmark) Kevin Juhl Pedersen
- (England) Steve Worrall
- (Denmark) Sam Jensen
- (Australia) Justin Sedgmen
- (Latvia) Jevgeņijs Kostigovs
- (Latvia) Daniils Kolodinskis
- (Latvia) Časts Puodžuks
- (Latvia) Ričards Ansviesulis

=== Previous teams ===
Extended content

2022 team

- (Australia) Nick Morris
- (Sweden) Victor Palovaara
- (England) Adam Ellis
- (Denmark) Kevin Juhl Pedersen
- (Latvia) Jevgeņijs Kostigovs
- (Latvia) Daniils Kolodinskis
- (Latvia) Ričards Ansviesulis

== Honours ==
Competitions	Total	Golden medals		Silver medals		Bronze medals
Competitions	Total	Total	Years	Total	Years	Total	Years
European Club (KPE) (since 1998)	2			1	2005	1	2001

== Season by season record ==
=== Russia ===
Season	League	Rang
1995	I	3rd
1996	I	3rd
1997	I	4th
1998	I	4th
1999	I	4th
2000	I	3rd
2001	I	3rd
2002	I	3rd
2003	I	4th
2004	I	4th
2005	I	8th

=== Poland ===
Season	League	Rang
2005	2. Liga	3rd
2006	2. Liga	3rd
2007	2. Liga	2nd (promotion)
2008	1. Liga	5th
2009	1. Liga	2nd
2010	1. Liga	4th
2011	1. Liga	5th
2012	1. Liga	4th
2013	1. Liga	4th
2014	1. Liga	6th
2015	1. Liga	winner
2016	1. Liga	winner
2017	1. Liga	3rd
2018	1. Liga	4th
2019	1. Liga	6th
2020	1. Liga	8th
2022	2. Liga	4th
2023	2. Liga	5th
2024	National league	

== Team name changes ==
- Iskra Daugavpils: 1964
- Lokomotiv Daugavpils: 1966–1993
- Daugavpils Speedway–Center: 2003–2004
- Daugavpils Speedway: 2005
- Daugavpils Speedway Center (Daugavpils Spīdveja centrs): 2006
- Lokomotiv Daugavpils (Daugavpils Lokomotīve): 2007–present

== See also ==
- Speedway Grand Prix of Latvia
- Sport in Latvia
- Speedway in Poland
