= Grigory Laguta =

Russian speedway rider

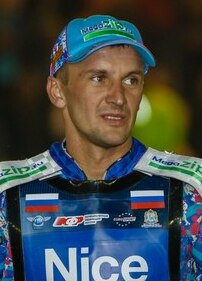
- Born: 9 April 1984 (age 42); Sukhodol, Soviet Union
- Nationality: Russian

Career history

Russia
- 2001–2023: Vladivostok

Poland
- 2006–2010: Daugavpils
- 2011–2014: Częstochowa
- 2015: Toruń
- 2016–2017: Rybnik
- 2019–2021: Motor Lublin

Sweden
- 2008–2009: Västervik
- 2010–2012: Valsarna
- 2013–2017, 2021: Smederna

Individual honours
- 2012, 2013, 2014, 2016, 2022, 2023: Russian Champion
- 2008, 2010, 2011, 2014: Latvian Champion
- 2015: Ekstraliga Riders’ Championship

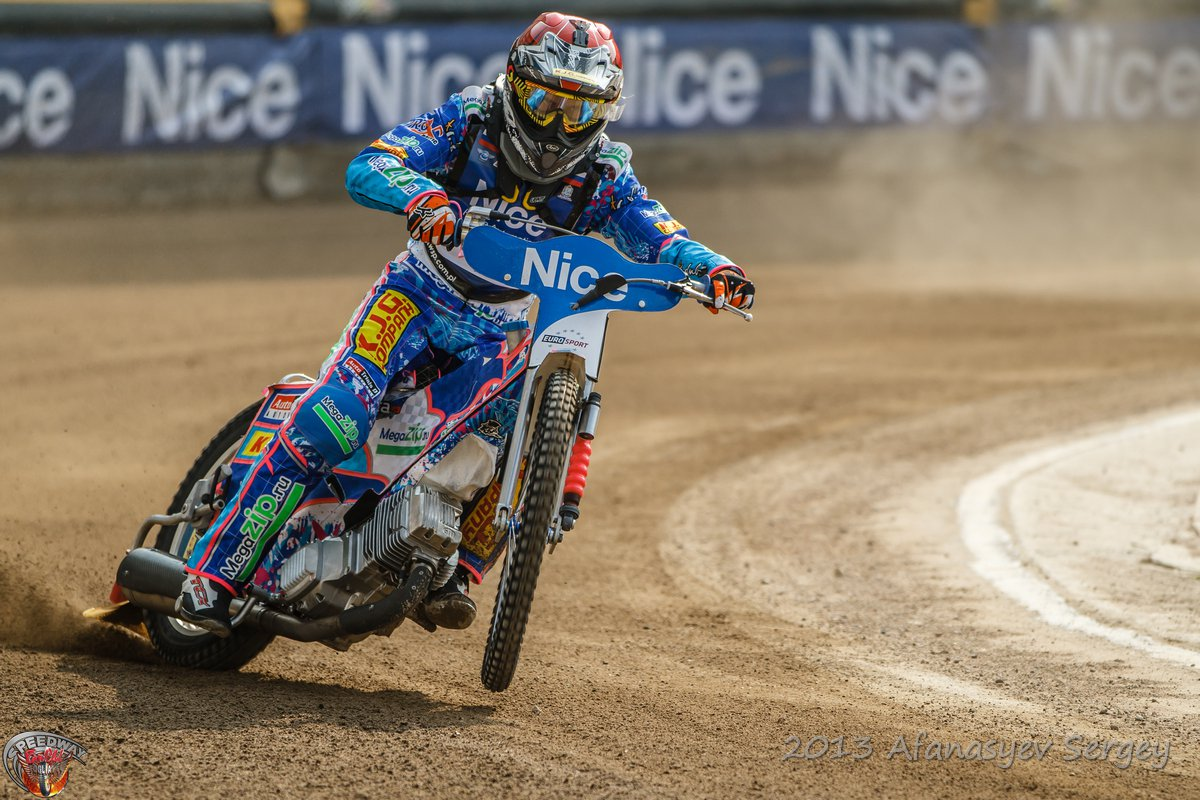

Grigory Grigorievich Laguta (born 9 April 1984) is a Russian motorcycle speedway rider. He is a six-time national champion.

== Career ==
Laguta is a six-time Russian Champion winning the title in 2012, 2013, 2014, 2016, 2022 and 2023.

Laguta previously held two speedway licences: Russian (MFR) and Latvian (LaMSF). This allowed him to become a four times champion of Latvia.

In 2017, Laguta was suspended for two years for a doping violation after having used meldonium. However, he later returned and in 2023, won his sixth Russian national title, which took him to just one win behind the Mikhail Starostin in the all-time list of winners.

== Family ==
Laguta's brother Artem is also a speedway rider, who was the 2021 world champion and his nephew is Vadim Tarasenko.

== Speedway Grand Prix results ==
2006 SGP
	Grand Prix	Pos.	Pts.	Heats	Draw
1 (1)	(Latvia) Daugavpils	17	0	(0)	17

2007 SGP
	Grand Prix	Pos.	Pts.	Heats	Draw
1 (2)	(Latvia) Daugavpils	7	8	(3,1,3,0,1) +0	14

2008 SGP
	Grand Prix	Pos.	Pts.	Heats	Draw
1 (3)	(Latvia) Daugavpils	15	2	(1,1,0,F,0)	6

2009 SGP
	Grand Prix	Pos.	Pts.	Heats	Draw
1 (4)	(Latvia) Daugavpils	13	6	(3,1,1,1,X)	10

permanent speedway rider
wild card, track reserve or qualified reserve
rider not classified (track reserve who did not start)

== Honours ==
- Individual World Championship (Speedway Grand Prix)
  - 2006 - 32nd place (0 points in 1 GP)
  - 2007 - 20th place (8 points in 1 GP)
- Team World Championship (Speedway World Cup)
  - 2008 - Semi-Final 1 will be on 12 July 2008
- European Club Champions' Cup
  - 2006 (Poland) Tarnów - 4th place (5 points)
  - 2007 - 2nd place in Semi-Final 2 (13 points)
  - 2008 (Czech Republic) Slaný - The Final will be on 6 September 2008 (12 pts in Semi-Final)
- Individual Latvian Championship
  - 2008 Daugavpils - Latvian Champion

== See also ==
- Russia national speedway team
- List of Speedway Grand Prix riders
