= Igor Marko =

Soviet/Ukrainian speedway rider

- Born: 29 June 1965; Rivne, Soviet Union
- Died: 16 November 2006 (aged 41)
- Nationality: Soviet / Ukrainian

Career history
- 1996: Opole
- 1997: Gdańsk
- 1998: Lublin
- 2002: Grudziądz
- 2004: Lviv
- 2005-06: Rivne

Individual honours
- 1986: European Junior Champion

Igor Marko (1965–2006) was an international speedway rider from the Soviet Union and Ukraine. He rode under the Soviet Union flag until the Dissolution of the Soviet Union.

== Speedway career ==
Marko competed in Britain during 1986 in the Telford ice international, he was the European junior champion at the time.

Marko won the gold medal at the Individual Speedway Junior European Championship in the 1986 Individual Speedway Junior European Championship.

Marko toured the United Kingdom in 1990 as part of the Russia national team.

== European final appearances ==
=== European Under-21 ===
- 1986 - (Soviet Union) Rivne Speedway Stadium, Rivne - 1st - 13pts

== Death ==
Marko was killed in a street robbery in Rivne, Ukraine, on 16 November 2006.
