= Maksims Bogdanovs =

Latvian speedway rider (born 1989)

- Born: 2 January 1989 (age 37); Daugavpils, Latvia
- Nationality: Latvian

Career history

Poland
- 2005–2011, 2013–2017: Daugavpils
- 2012: Gdańsk
- 2012: Łódź

Sweden
- 2009–: Masarna

Denmark
- 2014: Munkebo

Individual honours
- 2012, 2017: Latvian Champion

Maksims Bogdanovs (born 2 January 1989) is a motorcycle speedway rider from Latvia.

== Career ==
Bogdanovs participated in Speedway Grand Prix of Latvia competitions in 2007 and 2008.

Bogdanovs was part of the Lokomotiv Daugavpils team that first competed in the Polish leagues in 2005.

Bogdanovs is twice become a champion of Latvia, winning the Latvian Individual Speedway Championship in 2012 and 2017.

Bogdanovs returned to race in the Speedway Grand Prix ten years after his last appearance by competing in the 2017 Speedway Grand Prix of Latvia, where he score eight points.

== Honours ==
=== World Championships ===
- Individual World Championship (Speedway Grand Prix)
  - 2007 - 31st place (2 points in one event)
  - 2008 - 33rd place (0 points in one event)
- Team World Championship (Speedway World Cup)
  - 2006 - 4th place in Qualifying round 1
  - 2007 - 3rd place in Qualifying round 1
  - 2009 - 2nd place in Qualifying round 2
- Individual U-21 World Championship
  - 2007 - 12th place in Semi-Final 2
  - 2008 - 16th place in Semi-Final 2
  - 2009 - 15th place in Semi-Final 1

=== European Championships ===
- Individual European Championship
  - 2008 - injury before the Final (6th place in Semi-Final 3)
- Individual U-19 European Championship
  - 2005 - (Czech Republic) Mšeno - 17th place (1 point)
  - 2007 - (Poland) Częstochowa - 12th place (6 points)
  - 2008 - 6th place in Semi-Final 1
- Team U-19 European Championship
  - 2008 - 3rd place in Semi-Final 2
- European Club Champions' Cup
  - 2007 - 2nd place in Semi-Final 2
  - 2008 - (Czech Republic) Slaný - 4th place (4 points)

== See also ==
- Russia national speedway team
- List of Speedway Grand Prix riders
