= Andrejs Koroļevs =

Polish speedway rider

- Born: 30 July 1969 (age 57)
- Nationality: Latvian/Polish (dual)

Career history
- 1992–1994, 2001: Grudziądz
- 1995–2000: Leszno
- 2002: Gdańsk
- 2003: Rawicz
- 2004: Gniezno
- 2005–2006, 2008: Daugavpils

Individual honours
- 1991, 1995, 1997, 2000, 2001: Latvian Champion

Andrejs Koroļevs (born 30 July 1969) is a former motorcycle speedway rider from Latvia. Since 1996, he raced on a Polish licence after gaining Polish citizenship and was known as Andrzej Korolew. He is a five-time champion of Latvia.

== Career ==
Koroļevs won his first national championship in 1991, the same year in which the restoration of independence of Latvia took place. he had previously competed in the Soviet Union Individual Speedway Championship.

Koroļevs won the title four more times in 1995, 1997, 2000 and 2001. He is regarded as the Latvian rider who paved the way for a new group of riders emerging from the country.

== Speedway Grand Prix results ==
2006 Speedway Grand Prix Final Championship standings (Riding No 18)
| Race no. | Grand Prix | Pos. | Pts. | Heats | Draw No |
|---|---|---|---|---|---|
| 9 /10 | (Latvia) Latvian SGP | 18 | 0 | (0) | 18 |

| permanent speedway rider |
| wild card, track reserve or qualified reserve |
| rider not classified (track reserve who did not start) |

== Honours ==
=== World Championships ===
- Individual World Championship (Speedway Grand Prix)
  - 2006 - 34th place (0 points)
- Individual U-21 World Championship
  - 1990 - (Soviet Union) Lviv - track reserve (3 points)
- Team World Championship (Speedway World Cup)
  - 2003 - 3rd place in Qualifying round
  - 2008 - 3rd place in Qualifying Round 1

=== European Championships ===
- European Pairs Championship
  - 2005 - (Poland) Gdańsk - 7th place (2 points)
- European Club Champions' Cup
  - 2001 - (Latvia) Daugavpils - Bronze medal (10 points)
  - 2002 - (Czech Republic) Pardubice - 5th place (3 points)
  - 2006 - (Poland) Tarnów - 4th place (4 points)
  - 2008 - (Czech Republic) Slaný - 4th place (6 points)

== See also ==
- Latvia national speedway team
- List of Speedway Grand Prix riders
- Speedway in Poland
