= Kjasts Puodžuks =

Latvian speedway rider

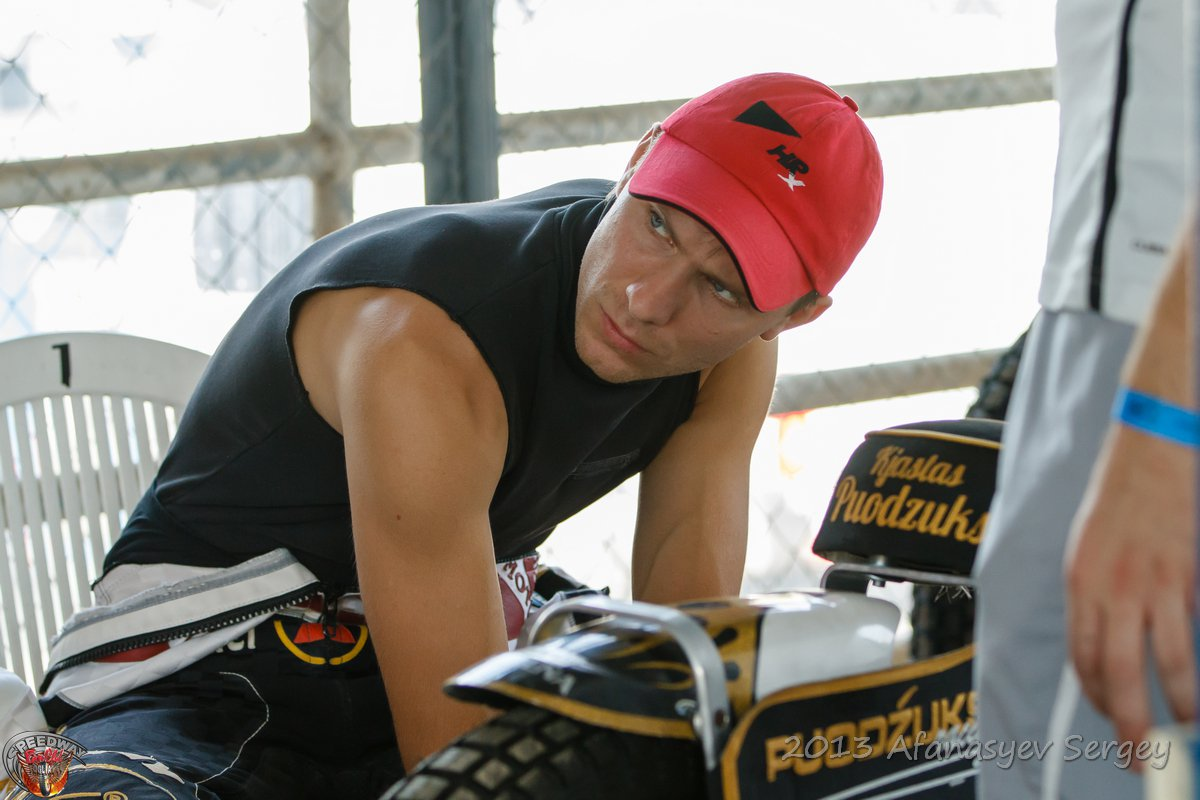
- Born: 23 August 1986 (age 40); Daugavpils, Latvia
- Nationality: Latvian

Career history

Great Britain
- 2005: Oxford

Poland
- 2005–2006, 2008–2025: Daugavpils
- 2007: Gniezno

Kjastas Poudžuks (born 23 August 1986) is a motorcycle speedway rider from Latvia and the former Latvian champion.

== Speedway career ==
Puodžuks rode in the top tier of British Speedway riding for the Oxford Cheetahs during the 2005 Elite League speedway season. He was signed by the Oxford promoter Nigel Wagstaff.

Puodžuks was part of the Lokomotiv Daugavpils team that first competed in the Polish leagues in 2005. In 2009, he rode for the first time in the Allsvenskan (the Swedish leagues).

== Speedway Grand Prix results ==
Year	Position	Points	Best Finish	Notes
2006	21st	4	10th	Track wildcard at Latvian GP.
2007	33rd	1	17th	Track reserve at Latvian GP.
2014	N/A	10	5th	Track reserve at Latvian GP.

== Honours ==
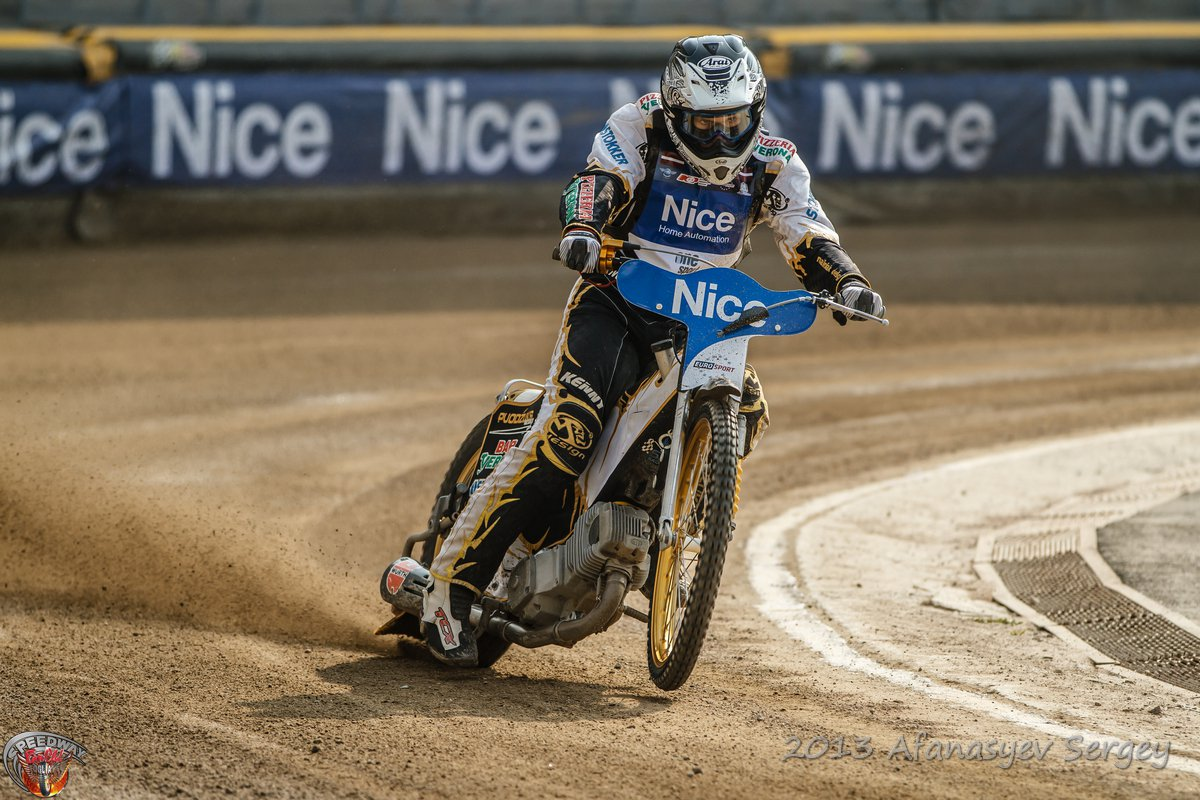

- Individual World Championship (Speedway Grand Prix):
  - 2006 - 21 place (4 points)
  - 2007 - (1 points)
- Individual U-21 World Championship:
  - 2007 - 13 place (3 point)
- Team World Championship (Speedway World Cup):
  - 2006 - 4 place in Qualifying round 1 (11 points)
  - 2009 - 2nd place in Qualifying round 2 (15 points)
- Individual U-19 European Championship:
  - 2002 - track reserve (2 points)
  - 2004 - 5 place (10 points)
  - 2005 - Silver medal (11 points)
- European Club Champions' Cup:
  - 2008 - (Czech Republic) Slaný - 4th place (2 points)
- Individual Latvian Championship:
  - 2004 - Latvian Champion
  - 2006 - Silver medal
  - 2007 - Latvian Champion
  - 2015 - Latvian Champion
- Individual Junior Latvian Championship:
  - 2003 - Latvian Champion
  - 2004 - Latvian Champion
  - 2005 - Latvian Champion
  - 2006 - Latvian Champion

== See also ==
- Latvia national speedway team
- List of Speedway Grand Prix riders
