= Bent Jensen =

Bent Jensen may refer to:

- Bent Jensen (equestrian) (born 1955), Danish Olympic equestrian
- Bent Jensen (footballer) (born 1947), Danish football player
- Bent Jensen (rower) (1925–2016), Danish rower
- Bent Jensen (businessman) (born 1951/52), Danish businessman
- Bent Jensen (speedway rider), Danish speedway rider
- Bent Jensen (historian) (born 1938), Danish historian
