= 2003 Speedway World Cup =

44th edition of the annual motorcycle speedway World Cup competition

Speedway World Cup
- Venues: Holsted, Outrup, and Vojens
- Location: Denmark
- Start date: 3 August
- End date: 9 August
- Nations: 12

Champions
- Sweden

The 2003 Speedway World Cup (SWC) was the 3rd FIM Speedway World Cup season. The final took place on 9 August 2003 in Vojens, Denmark. The tournament was won by Sweden (62 pts) and they beat Australia (57 points), host team Denmark (53 pts) and Poland (49 pts), Great Britain (44 pts) in the Final.

== Qualification ==
- Qualifying round
- 11 May 2003
- (Latvia) Latvijas Spidveja Centrs, Daugavpils

Pos.	National team	Pts.
1	Germany	65
2	Slovenia	62+4
3	Latvia	62+3
4	Italy	39
5	Austria	19

== Venues ==
Three cities were selected to host SWC finals events:

City	Stadium names
Holsted	Holsted Speedway Center
Outrup	Outrup Speedway Center
Vojens	Vojens Speedway Center

== Qualifying round ==
=== Holsted (1) ===
- Event 1
- 3 August 2003
- (Denmark) Holsted

Pos.	National team	Pts.
1	Denmark	62
2	Czech Republic	50
3	Finland	32
4	Germany	10

=== Outrup (2) ===
- Event 2
- 4 August 2003
- (Denmark) Outrup
- Latvia team (3rd in Qualifying round) was replaced by Italy (4th in Qualifying round)

Pos.	National team	Pts.
1	Australia	62
2	Great Britain	60
3	Slovenia	28
4	Italy	6

=== Holsted (3) ===
- Event 3
- 5 August 2003
- (Denmark) Holsted

Pos.	National team	Pts.
1	Poland	58
2	Sweden	56
3	Russia	28
4	Hungary	9

== Race-off ==
- Race-Off
- 7 August 2003
- (Denmark) Outrup

Pos.	National team	Pts.
1	Great Britain	80
2	Sweden	63
3	Czech Republic	61
4	Finland	26
5	Russia	24

== Final ==
The 2003 Speedway World Cup Final took place on 9 August in the Speedway Center in Vojens, Denmark.

=== Results ===
Pos.	National team	Pts.
1	Sweden	62
2	Australia	57
3	Denmark	53
4	Poland	49
5	Great Britain	44

=== Heat details ===
Placing	Team / Rider name	Total	1	2	3	4	5	6	7	8	9	10	11	12	13	14	15	16	17	18	19	20	21	22	23	24	25
1	Sweden	62	0	4	6	8	11	15	17	18	21	25	26	26	29	31	31	35	35	37	45	49	50	52	55	59	62
1	(1) Andreas Jonsson	12	0								3				3							4		2
1	(2) Mikael Max	25		4								4				2		4			8J				3
1	(3) Peter Ljung	10			2			4									0		0							4
1	(4) Peter Karlsson	10				2			2				1							2							3
1	(5) David Ruud	5					3			1				0							-		1
2	Australia	57	4	7	7	10	14	15	19	23	25	25	25	28	32	36	40	42	46	50	50	52	54	54	55	56	57
2	(1) Jason Crump	17	4							4						4			4								1
2	(2) Todd Wiltshire	15		3							2						4			4			2
2	(3) Jason Lyons	0			X							X	X								0			0
2	(4) Ryan Sullivan	10				3		1						3								2			1
2	(5) Leigh Adams	15					4		4						4			2								1
3	Denmark	53	3	4	8	9	11	13	13	15	15	18	22	23	25	26	27	28	31	34	36	36	40	48	50	53	53
3	(1) Nicki Pedersen	21	3									3		1						3				8J		3
3	(2) Hans N. Andersen	7		1				2							2						2						0
3	(3) Bjarne Pedersen	9			4				0							1						X	4
3	(4) Ronni Pedersen	4				1				2							-	1						-
3	(5) Charlie Gjedde	12					2				X		4				1		3						2
4	Poland	49	2	4	5	9	10	13	16	16	17	18	21	25	25	25	27	27	28	28	31	32	38	41	45	45	49
4	(1) Tomasz Gollob	20	2						3								2				3		6J		4
4	(2) Tomasz Bajerski	6		2						0			3									1				0
4	(3) Jarosław Hampel	13			1						1			4				0						3			4
4	(4) Sebastian Ułamek	6				4						1			0				1				-
4	(5) Piotr Protasiewicz	4					1	3								X				0				-
5	Great Britain	44	1	1	4	4	4	4	5	8	16	18	20	22	23	26	29	32	34	35	36	39	39	40	40	42	44
5	(1) Gary Havelock	3	1					0					2					-					X
5	(2) Dean Barker	6		0					1					2					2					1
5	(3) David Norris	8			3					3					1					1					0
5	(4) Lee Richardson	14				0					8J					3					1					2
5	(5) Scott Nicholls	13					0					2					3	3				3					2
Placing	Team / Rider name	Total	1	2	3	4	5	6	7	8	9	10	11	12	13	14	15	16	17	18	19	20	21	22	23	24	25

M - exclusion for exceeding two minute time allowance • T - exclusion for touching the tapes • X - other exclusion • E - retired or mechanical failure • F - fell

Helmet colours were permanent for each team (red, blue, white, yellow/black and green). Colours in tables show gate positions:
gate A – inside	gate B	gate C	gate D	gate E – outside

== See also ==
- 2003 Speedway Grand Prix
