= 2003 Speedway World Cup Race-off =

Annual motorcycle speedway world team championship event

Information
- Date: 7 August 2003
- City: Outrup
- Event: 4 of 5 (14)

SWC Results
Winner		Great Britain - 80 pts
Runner-up		Sweden - 63 pts
3rd place		Czech Republic - 61 pts
4th place		Finland - 26 pts
5th place		Russia - 24 pts

The 2003 Speedway World Cup Race-off was the fourth race of the 2003 Speedway World Cup season. It took place on 7 August 2003 at the Outrup Speedway Center in Outrup, Denmark.

== Results ==
Pos.	National team	Pts.
1	Great Britain	80
2	Sweden	63
3	Czech Republic	61
4	Finland	26
5	Russia	24

== Heat details ==
Placing	Team / Rider Name	Total	1	2	3	4	5	6	7	8	9	10	11	12	13	14	15	16	17	18	19	20	21	22	23	24	25
1	Great Britain	80	4	4	8	12	15	18	20	24	28	31	35	39	41	45	47	50	54	58	60	63	67	69	73	77	80
1	(1) Scott Nicholls	19	4							4						4			4								3
1	(2) Dean Barker	14		0							4						2			4			4
1	(3) Gary Havelock	15			4							3	4								2			2
1	(4) Lee Richardson	18				4		3						4								3			4
1	(5) David Norris	14					3		2						2			3								4
2	Sweden	63	1	4	4	6	10	14	18	19	22	26	28	30	34	37	38	38	38	41	45	49	50	54	56	59	63
2	(1) Andreas Jonsson	20	1								3				4						4	4		4
2	(2) Mikael Max	12		3								4				3		X							2
2	(3) Peter Ljung	5			E			4									1		0							-
2	(4) Peter Karlsson	18				2			4				2							3						3	4
2	(5) David Ruud	8					4			1				2							-		1
3	Czech Republic	61	3	7	10	11	13	15	15	18	20	20	23	26	27	29	33	37	40	41	44	46	49	52	58	59	61
3	(1) Aleš Dryml Jr.	11	3									T		3					3	1						1
3	(2) Tomáš Topinka	18		4				2							1						3				6J		2
3	(3) Lukáš Dryml	10			3				0							2						2	3
3	(4) Bohumil Brhel	18				1				3			3				4	4						3
3	(5) Antonín Šváb Jr.	4					2				2		-						-						-
4	Finland	26	0	2	3	6	7	7	8	10	11	13	13	13	16	16	16	18	19	19	20	20	22	23	24	26	26
4	(1) Kauko Nieminen	3	0						1								0				1				1
4	(2) Joonas Kylmäkorpi	6		2						2			E									0				2	0
4	(3) Juha Hautamäki	2			1						1			0				-									-
4	(4) Kaj Laukkanen	13				3						2			3			2	1				2
4	(5) Tomi Reima	2					1	0								0				0				1
5	Russia	24	2	3	5	5	5	6	9	9	9	10	11	12	12	13	16	18	20	22	22	23	23	23	23	23	24
5	(1) Sergey Darkin	6	2					1					1					2					F			X
5	(2) Renat Gafurov	7		1					3					1					2		0			X
5	(3) Denis Gizatullin	2			2					0					0					-					0
5	(4) Simon Vlasov	1				0					0					1					-					-
5	(5) Roman Povazhny	8					0					1					3			2		1					1
Placing	Team / Rider Name	Total	1	2	3	4	5	6	7	8	9	10	11	12	13	14	15	16	17	18	19	20	21	22	23	24	25

M - exclusion for exceeding two minute time allowance • T - exclusion for touching the tapes • X - other exclusion • E - retired or mechanical failure • F - fell

Helmet colours was permanent for each teams (Red, Blue, White, Yellow/Black and Green). Colours in diagrams means gate positions:
gate A – inside	gate B	gate C	gate D	gate E – outside

== See also ==
- 2003 Speedway World Cup
- motorcycle speedway
