= Faroe–Soviet Friendship Association =

Faroese pro-Soviet organisation

Faroe–Soviet Friendship Association (Danish: Færøsk-Sovjetisk Venskabsforening), was a pro-USSR organization in the Faroe Islands founded in 1979, as a section of Landsforeningen Danmark-Sovjetunionen (National Association Denmark-Soviet Union). The chairman of the association was Andreas S. Højgaard, who was not a declared Communist. The association arranged cultural exchanges and study trips to the Soviet Union. As of 1983, it had 100 members.

In 1978, Højgaard, the rector of the teacher's seminary in Tórshavn, was invited to visit the Soviet Union with his brother and 20 other Danish citizens. Following the trip, he contacted the Denmark–Soviet national association for help in organising a chapter in the Faroe Islands. The Faroe–Soviet Friendship Association was established in November 1979.

In 2000, Danish historian Bent Jensen was commissioned by the Faroese government to conduct research into "The Faroe Islands during the Cold War", including the history of the Faroe–Soviet Friendship Association.
