= Esbjerg Stadium =

Football stadium in Esbjerg, Denmark

Blue Water Arena
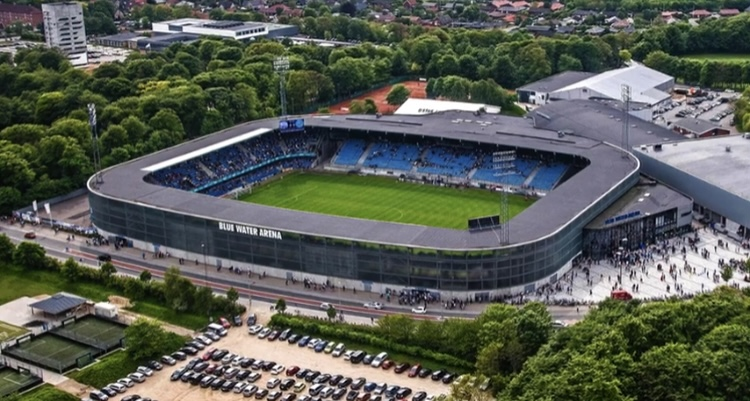
- Interactive map of Blue Water Arena
- Former names: Esbjerg Idrætspark; Esbjerg Stadion (1955–2007)
- Location: Gl. Vardevej 62; 6700 Esbjerg
- Coordinates: 55°28′55″N 8°26′22″E
- Owner: Esbjerg Municipality
- Operator: Sport & Event Park Esbjerg
- Capacity: 17,442
- Surface: Grass
- Record attendance: 22,000 (Esbjerg fB vs. KB, 1961)
- Field size: 105 x 68 m

Construction
- Built: 1955 (original site 1929)
- Opened: 1955
- Renovated: 1999, 2004, 2009
- Cost: 105,000,000 DKK (Note: 2009 renovation)
- Architect: Friis & Moltke
- Structural engineer: Grontmij Carl Bro
- General contractor: Davidsen Partnere

Tenants
- Esbjerg fB (1955–present); European Youth Olympic Festival (1999)

The Esbjerg Stadium (Danish: Esbjerg Stadion), known as the Blue Water Arena for sponsorship reasons, is a football stadium located within Esbjerg Idrætspark in Esbjerg, Denmark. It is the home ground of Esbjerg fB and has a capacity of 17,442, of which 11,286 is seated. It is currently the second-biggest stadium in Jutland, and the fourth-biggest in Denmark.

== History ==
The Esbjerg Idrætspark was founded in 1926 and the football pitch, with a running track and area for shot put, high jump, pole vault and long jump, opened on 22 September 1929. In 1948, the adjacent Esbjerg Atletikstadion was constructed and opened. During 1951, the reconstruction of the football stadium began but the municipality ran out of funds and the project stopped. In 1955, a new grandstand was built and the new stadium was inaugurated.

In 1999, the stadium was venue of the football tournament at the European Youth Olympic Festival.

On account of the 2008 UEFA qualifier fan attack resulting in the forbidding of play of UEFA qualifier matches for Denmark within 250 km of Copenhagen, the Esbjerg Stadium was mentioned as the only possible venue within Denmark in which Denmark UEFA qualifier home games can be held as it is the biggest stadium in the country more than 250 km from Copenhagen. UEFA later changed the verdict, and on July 9, 2007 the Danish Football Association announced that the games against Spain and Liechtenstein would be played in Århus and the games against Latvia and Iceland would be played in Copenhagen.

== National games ==
Esbjerg Stadium has twice been used as home ground for the Danish national team. Further it has been venue of several youth national matches:

Date	Home team	Res.	Away team	Competition	Spectators
22 June 1952	Denmark U-21	3–2	Sweden U-21	Friendly match	6,600
10 October 1954	Denmark B	1–2	Sweden B	Friendly match	15,467
19 May 1956	Denmark U-19	1–2	England U-19	Friendly match	5,000
5 November 1961	Denmark U-21	0–0	Poland U-21	Friendly match	5,800
21 June 1966	Denmark	1–3	Portugal	Friendly match	14,500
26 May 1969	Denmark U-21	0–3	Switzerland U-21	Friendly match	4,500
14 November 1972	Denmark U-23	0–2	Poland U-23	1974 UEFA European Under-23 Football Championship qualifying	1,100
4 September 1974	Denmark U-21	2–2	Belgium U-21	Friendly match	2,000
31 October 1979	Denmark U-18	1–3	England U-18	1980 UEFA European Under-18 Football Championship qualifying	?
13 April 1994	Denmark U-17	4–1	Austria U-17	Friendly match	?
13 July 1999	Denmark U-16	3–2	Rep. of Ireland U-16	1999 European Youth Summer Olympic Festival	?
14 July 1999	Denmark U-16	0–2	Switzerland U-16	1999 European Youth Summer Olympic Festival	?
15 July 1999	Denmark U-16	2–1	Iceland U-16	1999 European Youth Summer Olympic Festival	?
14 November 2009	Denmark	0–0	South Korea	Friendly match	15,789
15 November 2011	Denmark	2–1	Finland	Friendly match	14,137

== See also ==
- Esbjerg fB
- Esbjerg Skøjtehal
- Esbjerg Stadionhal
- List of football stadiums in Denmark
