= Hillerød Stadium =

Stadium complex in Hillerød, Denmark

- Interactive map of Hillerød Stadium
- Full name: Hillerød Stadium
- Location: Selskovvej 76, 3400 Hillerød, Denmark
- Coordinates: 55°56′41″N 12°17′44″E

Construction
- Opened: 22 August 1954*
- Expanded: 1977

Tenant
- Hillerød Fodbold

Hillerød Stadium (Danish: Hillerød Stadion) is a multi-use sports complex in Hillerød, Denmark. It is currently used for football matches and is the home stadium of Hillerød Fodbold. The complex was earlier the site of the Selskov Stadium and was used for motorcycle speedway events, often with crowds in excess of 10,000.

== Football ==
Frederiksborg Slotssogn stood behind the 1958 construction of a new sports facility at the Selskov Stadium (which itself was built in 1954), consisting of a couple of association football fields and a small changing room on a hill. Selskov Stadium was expanded in 1977, with three new association football fields established.

In 1986, a new clubhouse was constructed and funded by the city council. For several years, up until 1990, the athletic course in the southwest corner of the stadium had been used for motorcycle speedway races, often gathering attendances of up to 10,000 people, but new safety regulations and several noise complaints from neighbors resulted in this activity being moved to Slangerup. Speedway had worn out the running tracks at the athletic ground.

A new athletic ground was inaugurated in 1997 and the Selskov Stadium changed its name to Hillerød Stadium. In 2005, Hillerød Municipality constructed a new association field at the area behind Ødammen in the east section of the sports center, which was officially inaugurated in 2008.

== Speedway ==
In 1954, the Frederiksborg Amts Motorklub (FAM) built a 400 metres speedway track, which became known as the Selskov Stadium. It opened on 22 August 1954 and soon became the chosen stadium for major Danish speedway events, replacing the Amager speedway track in Copenhagen as the first choice venue.

It regularly hosted qualifying rounds of the Speedway World Championship from 1959 to 1974 and also held the Danish Speedway Championship on multiple occasions from 1956 to 1983.

The track record holder was the legendary rider Erik Gundersen who recorded a time of 73.3 seconds on 21 August 1983.

The last meeting on the track was held on 8 September 1985, following new safety regulations and several noise complaints from neighbours. Frederiksborg Amts Motorklub moved to the Slangerup Speedway Center.
