= Leif Bech =

Danish speedway rider

- Born: c. 1927; Denmark
- Died: 27 August 2013 (aged 86); Melbourne, Australia
- Nationality: Danish

Individual honours
- 1952, 1954: Danish Champion

Leif Bech (c. 1927–2013) was a speedway rider from Denmark.

== Speedway career ==
Bech was a two-time champion of Denmark, winning the Danish Championship in 1952 and 1954.

In 1955, Bech emigrated to Australia and was a blacksmith by trade.
