= Granly Speedway Arena =

Stadium in Esbjerg, Denmark

- Interactive map of Granly Speedway Arena
- Location: Tinghedevej 9, 6715 Esbjerg kommune, Denmark
- Coordinates: 55°31′37″N 8°35′20″E
- Field size: 320 metres (0.320)

Construction
- Opened: 7 July 1946
- Renovated: 1 May 1977

Tenant
- Motorcycle speedway

Granly Speedway Arena is a speedway track in Esbjerg, Denmark. The track is located on the Tinghedevej 9 road, about 16 kilometres east of the town and is adjacent to the Vestjysk Motocross Club. The stadium hosts the speedway team known as the Esbjerg Speedway Klub, who race in the Danish Speedway League and have been champions of Denmark 11 times, as of 2023.

== History ==
Founded in 1929, Esbjerg Motor Sport bought a piece of moorland at the Korskro Inn, during the spring of 1946. After construction the stadium opened with an attendance of 6,000 spectators on 7 July 1946.

The year of 1955 proved significant because speedway was moved to the Esbjerg Athletic Stadium due to financial problems. The track remained open however and was extended in size during 1955. Speedway returned in 1970 and the venue hosted the 1972 Danish Individual Speedway Championship.

In 1975, the site was entirely rebuilt into the Esbjerg Motor Center or Korskro Motor Center, which included two standard speedway tracks in addition to one longtrack and one smaller 80cc track. The venue opened on 1 May 1977. The venue held the 1978 Danish final and soon hosted a major international event; the 1982 Individual Long Track World Championship (which attracted over 20,000 people).

In 1984, further developments took place with the speedway track rotating 90 degrees and the mapping of a motocross circuit. The following year it hosted the 1985 Individual Long Track World Championship.

The longtrack was later demolished but further Danish Championship finals were held on the speedway track in 2005, 2010, 2011 and 2018. In-between in 2014, the stadium was renamed the Granly Speedway Arena.
