= Danish Individual Speedway Championship =

Danish motorcycle speedway national championship

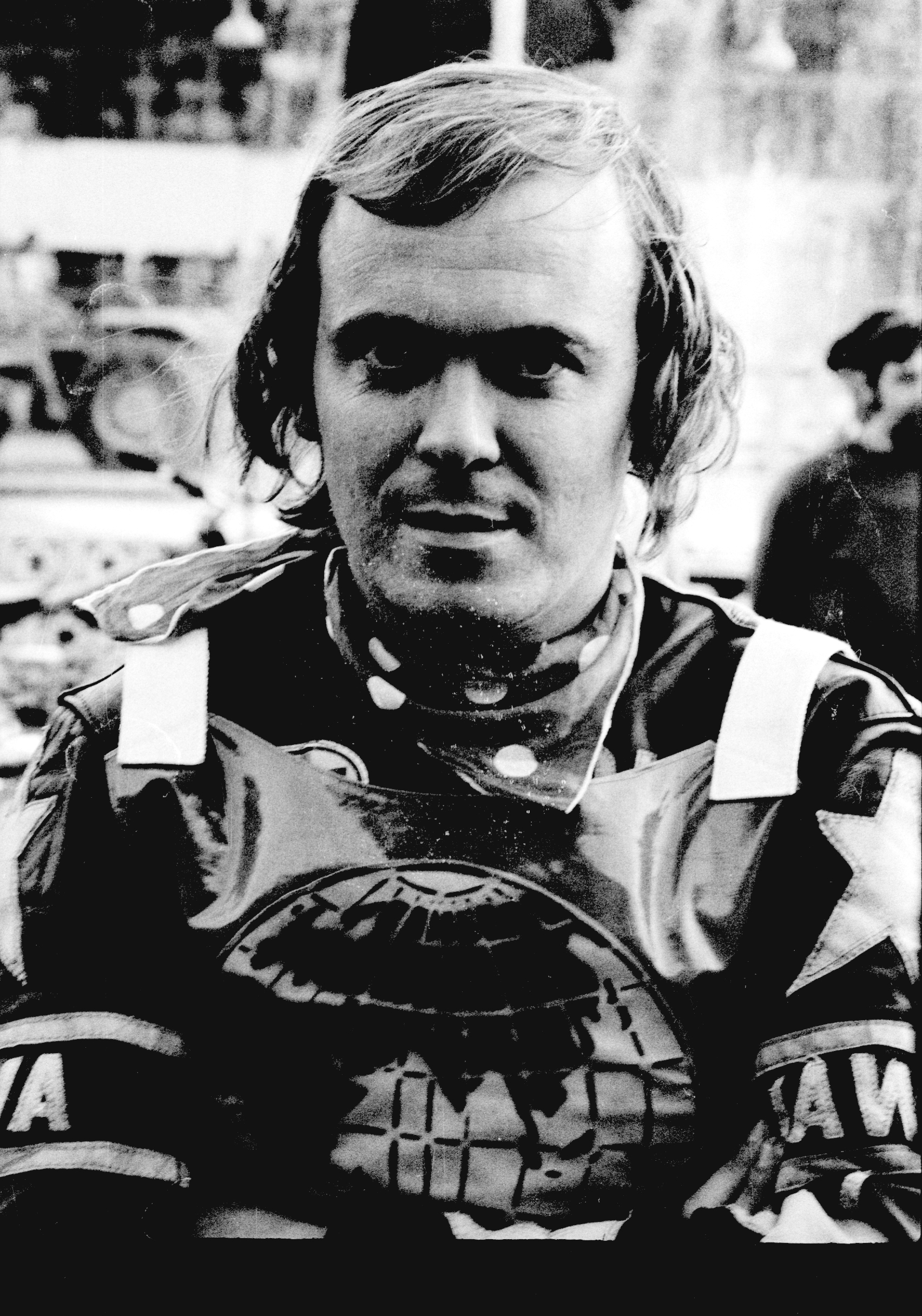
- Ole Olsen
- Sport: Motorcycle speedway
- Founded: 1947
- Most titles: Ole Olsen 12

Individual Speedway Danish Championship is the National competition for Danish speedway riders to determine the champion of Denmark. The winner of the final is awarded a gold medal and declared Danish Individual Champion. The riders finishing second and third are awarded silver and bronze medals respectively.

== History ==
The event was first held in 1930, although from 1930 to 1951, there was no definitive difference between the short track and long track Championships of Denmark. The 500cc special class is recorded as the champion in this list. Ole Olsen has been the champion of Denmark the most times, winning 12 times from 1967 to 1981.

The final of the Danish Championship regularly doubled up as the Danish qualification round for the Speedway World Championship.

Since the Speedway Grand Prix era, riders must hold a Danish passport and a valid DMU licence. Any riders who competed in the Speedway Grand Prix during the previous season were seeded direct to the final. The DMU also seeded other riders directly to the final at their discretion.

== Past winners ==
Year	Venue/s	Winners	Runner-up	3rd place
1930	Amager	Aage Wagner		
1932	Amager	Aage Wagner	Svend Aage Sorensen	Chr. Jorgensen
1933	Korsoer	Svend Aage Sorensen	Sejer Dybro	Poul Kalor
1934	Korsoer	Svend Aage Sorensen	Bent Jensen	Poul Kalor
1935	Amager	Svend Aage Engstrom	Boegh Mathiesen	Poul Kalor
1936	Amager	Svend Aage Engstrom	Hans Hansen	Svend Aage Sorensen
1937	Frederikssund	Baltzer Hansen		
1938	Amager	Baltzer Hansen		
1947	Fangel	Irving Irvinger	Niels Erik Nielsen	Svend Aa. Rasmussen
1948	Charlottenlund	Bent Jensen	Aage Andersen	Peter Andersen
1949	Hobro	Orla Knudsen	Aage Andersen	Bent Jensen
1950	Fangel	Svend Nissen	Lindegaard Petersen	Jorgen Nielsen
1951	Aarhus	Kiehn Berthelsen	Morian Hansen	Orla Knudsen
First Official Championship
1952	Odense Athletics Stadium	Leif Bech	Orla Knudsen	Kiehn Berthelsen
1953	Amager, Copenhagen	Kiehn Berthelsen	Erik Winzentz	Leif Bech
1954	Holbæk Stadium	Leif Bech	Kiehn Berthelsen	Erhard Fisker
1955	Amager, Copenhagen	Kiehn Berthelsen	Arne Pander	Irving Irvinger
1956	Selskov Stadium, Hillerød	Arne Pander	Axel Muller	Erik Winzentz
1957	Selskov Stadium, Hillerød	Svend Nissen	Erik Kastebo	Arne Pander
1958	Amager, Copenhagen	Arne Pander	Erik Kastebo	Kurt W. Petersen
1959	Selskov Stadium, Hillerød	Erik Kastebo	Svend Nissen	Arne Pander
1960	Esbjerg Athletic Stadium	Kurt W. Petersen	Hans Peter Boisen	Svend Nissen
1961	Selskov Stadium, Hillerød	Kurt W. Petersen	Erik Kastebo	Arne Pander
1962	Selskov Stadium, Hillerød	Kurt W. Petersen	John S. Andersen	Bent Jensen
1963	Selskov Stadium, Hillerød	Kurt W. Petersen	John S. Andersen	Bent Jensen
1964	Selskov Stadium, Hillerød	Hans Peter Boisen	Kurt W. Petersen	Erik Kastebo
1965	Selskov Stadium, Hillerød	Erik Kastebo	Ole Olsen	John S. Andersen
1966	Esbjerg Athletic Stadium	Godtfred Andreasen	Kurt Bøgh	Poul Vissing
1967	Selskov Stadium, Hillerød	Ole Olsen	Kurt Bøgh	Hans W. Johansen
1968	Esbjerg Athletic Stadium	Ole Olsen	Bent Nørregaard-Jensen	Kurt Bøgh
1969	Granly Speedway Arena, Esbjerg	Ole Olsen	Bent Nørregaard-Jensen	Niels Weiss
1970	Selskov Stadium, Hillerød	Ole Olsen	Bent Nørregaard-Jensen	Kurt Bøgh
1971	Fredericia Speedway Stadium	Ole Olsen	Kurt Bøgh	Bent Nørregaard-Jensen
1972	Granly Speedway Arena, Esbjerg	Ole Olsen	Bent Nørregaard-Jensen	Niels Schelde
1973	Selskov Stadium, Hillerød	Ole Olsen	Kurt Bøgh	Godtfred Andreasen
1974	Fredericia Speedway Stadium	Bent Nørregaard-Jensen	Finn Thomsen	Kurt Bøgh
1975	Selskov Stadium, Hillerød	Ole Olsen	Mike Lohmann	Kristian Præstbro
1976	Vojens Speedway Center	Ole Olsen	Finn Thomsen	Jens Erik Krause Kjær
1977	Fredericia Speedway Stadium	Ole Olsen	Finn Thomsen	Hans Nielsen
1978	Fjelsted Speedway, Harndrup	Hans Nielsen	Kristian Præstbro	Erik Gundersen
1979	Fredericia Speedway Stadium	Ole Olsen	Bo Petersen	Hans Nielsen
1980	Fjelsted Speedway, Harndrup	Bo Petersen	Erik Gundersen	Bent Rasmussen
1981	Vojens Speedway Center	Ole Olsen	Hans Nielsen	Tommy Knudsen
1982	Fladbro Speedway, Randers	Hans Nielsen	Erik Gundersen	Bo Petersen
1983	Selskov Stadium, Hillerød	Erik Gundersen	Hans Nielsen	Jens Rasmussen
1984	Brovst Speedway Center	Erik Gundersen	John Eskildsen	Hans Nielsen
1985	Fredericia Speedway Stadium	Erik Gundersen	Hans Nielsen	Tommy Knudsen
1986	Fladbro Speedway, Randers	Erik Gundersen	Hans Nielsen	Tommy Knudsen
1987	Fjelsted Speedway, Harndrup	Hans Nielsen	Erik Gundersen	Brian Karger
1988	Brovst Speedway Center	Jan O. Pedersen	Erik Gundersen	Jan Staechmann
1989	Slangerup Speedway Center	Erik Gundersen	Hans Nielsen	Gert Handberg
1990	Outrup Speedway Center	Hans Nielsen	Bo Petersen	Jan O. Pedersen
1991	Fredericia Speedway Stadium	Jan O. Pedersen	Gert Handberg	Peter Ravn
1992	Uhrebanen, Karup; Holsted Speedway Center	Gert Handberg	Brian Karger	John Jørgensen
1993	Fladbro Speedway, Randers; Fjelsted Speedway, Harndrup	Hans Nielsen	Tommy Knudsen	Brian Karger
1994	Skave Speedway, Holstebro; Fladbro Speedway, Randers	Hans Nielsen	Claus Jacobsen	Gert Handberg
1995	Frederikslyst, Horsens; Uhrebanen, Karup	Brian Andersen	Brian Karger	John Jørgensen
1996	Skave Speedway, Holstebro; Fjelsted Speedway, Harndrup	Brian Karger	Jan Staechmann	Brian Andersen
1997	Holsted Speedway Center	Tommy Knudsen	Brian Karger	Hans Nielsen
1998	Outrup Speedway Center	Brian Karger	John Jørgensen	Hans Nielsen
1999	Munkebo Speedway Center	Brian Andersen	Charlie Gjedde	Brian Karger
2000	Outrup Speedway Center	Brian Karger	Brian Andersen	John Jørgensen
2001	Outrup Speedway Center	Hans Clausen	Bjarne Pedersen	Jesper B. Jensen
2002	Outrup Speedway Center	Nicki Pedersen	Bjarne Pedersen	Hans N. Andersen
2003	Holsted Speedway Center	Nicki Pedersen	Hans N. Andersen	Jesper B. Jensen
2004	Holsted Speedway Center	Bjarne Pedersen	Nicki Pedersen	Kenneth Bjerre
2005	Fjelsted Speedway, Harndrup; Granly Speedway Arena, Esbjerg	Nicki Pedersen	Niels Kristian Iversen	Hans N. Andersen
2006	Outrup Speedway Center; Holsted Speedway Center	Nicki Pedersen	Hans N. Andersen	Kenneth Bjerre
2007	Holsted Speedway Center; Fjelsted Speedway, Harndrup	Hans N. Andersen	Bjarne Pedersen	Nicki Pedersen
2008	Holsted Speedway Center; Outrup Speedway Center	Nicki Pedersen	Hans N. Andersen	Niels Kristian Iversen
2009	Vojens Speedway Center; Fjelsted Speedway, Harndrup	Nicki Pedersen	Kenneth Bjerre	Hans N. Andersen
2010	Granly Speedway Arena, Esbjerg; Holsted Speedway Center	Kenneth Bjerre	Hans N. Andersen	Bjarne Pedersen
2011	Slangerup Speedway Center; Granly Speedway Arena, Esbjerg	Nicki Pedersen	Niels Kristian Iversen	Jesper B. Monberg
2012	Holsted Speedway Center; Outrup Speedway Center	Niels Kristian Iversen	Nicki Pedersen	Leon Madsen
2013	Slangerup Speedway Center; Holsted Speedway Center	Niels Kristian Iversen	Kenneth Bjerre	Michael Jepsen Jensen
2014	Skave Speedway, Holstebro; Fjelsted Speedway, Harndrup	Niels Kristian Iversen	Peter Kildemand	Bjarne Pedersen
2015	Slangerup Speedway Center	Niels Kristian Iversen	Nicki Pedersen	Hans N. Andersen
2016	Holsted Speedway Center	Niels Kristian Iversen	Kenneth Bjerre	Nicki Pedersen
2017	Fjelsted Speedway, Harndrup	Niels Kristian Iversen	Michael Jepsen Jensen	Mikkel Bech
2018	Granly Speedway Arena, Esbjerg	Niels Kristian Iversen	Mikkel Michelsen	Nicki Pedersen
2019	Holsted Speedway Center	Kenneth Bjerre	Niels Kristian Iversen	Rasmus Jensen
2020	Vojens Speedway Center	Anders Thomsen	Nicolai Klindt	Marcus Birkemose
2021	Vojens Speedway Center	Anders Thomsen	Nicki Pedersen	Leon Madsen
2022	Holsted Speedway Center	Rasmus Jensen	Anders Thomsen	Kenneth Bjerre
2023	Slangerup Speedway Center	Mikkel Michelsen	Mads Hansen	Patrick Hansen
2024	Billund Municipality Stadium, Grindsted	Anders Thomsen	Michael Jepsen Jensen	Mikkel Michelsen
2025	Brovst Speedway Center	Michael Jepsen Jensen	Anders Thomsen	Jonas Knudsen
2026	Granly Speedway Arena, Esbjerg	Leon Madsen	Frederik Jakobsen	Michael Jepsen Jensen

== Medals classification ==
- Three or more titles

Pos	Rider	Total	Gold	Silver	Bronze
1.	Ole Olsen	13	12	1	0
2.	Nicki Pedersen	14	7	4	3
3.	Niels-Kristian Iversen	11	7	3	1
4.	Hans Nielsen	16	6	5	5
5.	Erik Gundersen	10	5	4	1
6.	Kurt W. Petersen	6	4	1	1
7.	Brian Karger	9	3	3	3
8.	Kiehn Berthelsen	5	3	1	1
9.	Anders Thomsen	4	3	1	0

== See also ==
- Danish Speedway League
- Danish Under 21 Individual Speedway Championship
