= Baltzer Hansen =

Danish motorcycle speedway rider

- Born: 30 November 1908; Frederikssund, Denmark
- Died: Unknown
- Nationality: Danish

Career history
- 1936: Hackney Wick Wolves

Team honours
- 1936: London Cup winner

Alfred Hansen (30 November 1908 – date of death unknown), better known as Baltzer Hansen was a motorcycle speedway rider from Denmark, who rode in the first ever Speedway World Championship competition in 1936.

== Career ==
Hansen was born in 1908, to Lars Christian and Rasmine and was one of three brothers who all went into dirt-track racing (later motorcycle speedway). He won the Danish Individual Speedway Championship (500cc special class) in 1937 and 1938, having previously won Danish Championships in other classes.

Hansen followed his older brother Morian into the British speedway leagues in 1936. West Ham Hammers attempted to sign him in May 1936, but the Speedway Control Board blocked the transfer.

However, later that year, Hansen and another brother Kaj Hansen, also known as Kalle, were due to travel to London to compete in the inaugural 1936 World Championship. Baltzer impressed in the qualifying round and progressed to the Championship round.

To the annoyance of the other British teams (especially West Ham), the Hackney Wick Wolves were given permission to sign him in June 1936, because of their injury problems. The transfer started a season long campaign by clubs to ban overseas riders and West Ham unsuccessfully applied to the Control Board to recall Baltzer's brother Morian (who was still on their retained list). Meanwhile, Baltzer and Morian helped Hackney win the 1936 London Cup.

In 1937, Hansen returned to Denmark to race, following an initial ban on overseas riders and did not return to race in Britain, despite attempts by Hackney to bring him into the team again that season.
