= 1998 Danish speedway season =

Season of speedway in Denmark

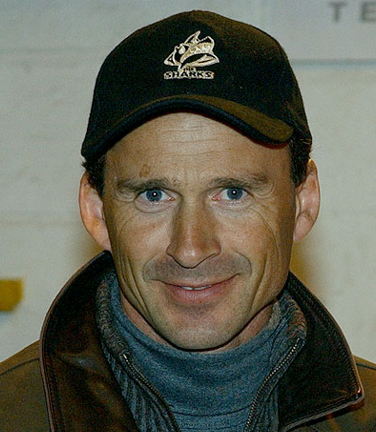
- Hans Nielsen topped the league averages and his team Brovst won the title.

The 1998 Danish speedway season was the 1998 season of motorcycle speedway in Denmark.

== Individual ==
=== Individual Championship ===
The 1998 Danish Individual Speedway Championship was the 1998 edition of the Danish Individual Speedway Championship. The final was held at Outrup on 22 May. The title was won by Brian Karger for the second time.

The Championship formed part of the 1999 Speedway Grand Prix Qualification with 5 riders qualifying for the Scandinavian Final.

Final

Pos.	Rider	Team	Total
1	Brian Karger	Holsted	14
2	John Jørgensen	Fjelsted	12
3	Hans Nielsen	Brovst	11
4	Nicki Pedersen	Holstebro	9
5	Bjarne Pedersen	Brovst	9
6	Hans Clausen	Holstebro	9
7	Frede Schött	Holsted	9
8	Charlie Gjedde	Outrup	9
9	Ronni Pedersen	Slangerup	8
10	Gert Handberg	Holstebro	7
11	Claus Kristensen	Herning	6
12	Bo Skov Eriksen	Outrup	5
13	Aksel Jepsen	Holsted	4
14	Brian Andersen	Holsted	3
15	Jesper B. Jensen	Outrup	2
16	Allan Damgaard	Holsted	2
17	Jesper Steentoff (res)	Outrup	1

Key - Each heat has four riders, 3 points for a heat win, 2 for 2nd, 1 for third and 0 for last

=== Junior Championship ===
Ronnie Henningsen won the Junior Championship.

== Team ==
=== Danish Superliga ===
The 1998 season was won by Brovst for the second time.

Pos	Team	P	W	2nd	3rd	4th	Pts
1	Brovst	12	8	4	0	0	32
2	Holstebro	12	5	6	0	1	26
3	Holsted	12	5	4	2	1	25
4	Outrup	12	1	3	8	0	17
5	Slangerup	12	1	3	4	4	13
6	Fjelsted	12	1	1	5	5	10
7	Herning	12	0	0	2	10	2
