= 1997 Danish speedway season =

Season of speedway in Denmark

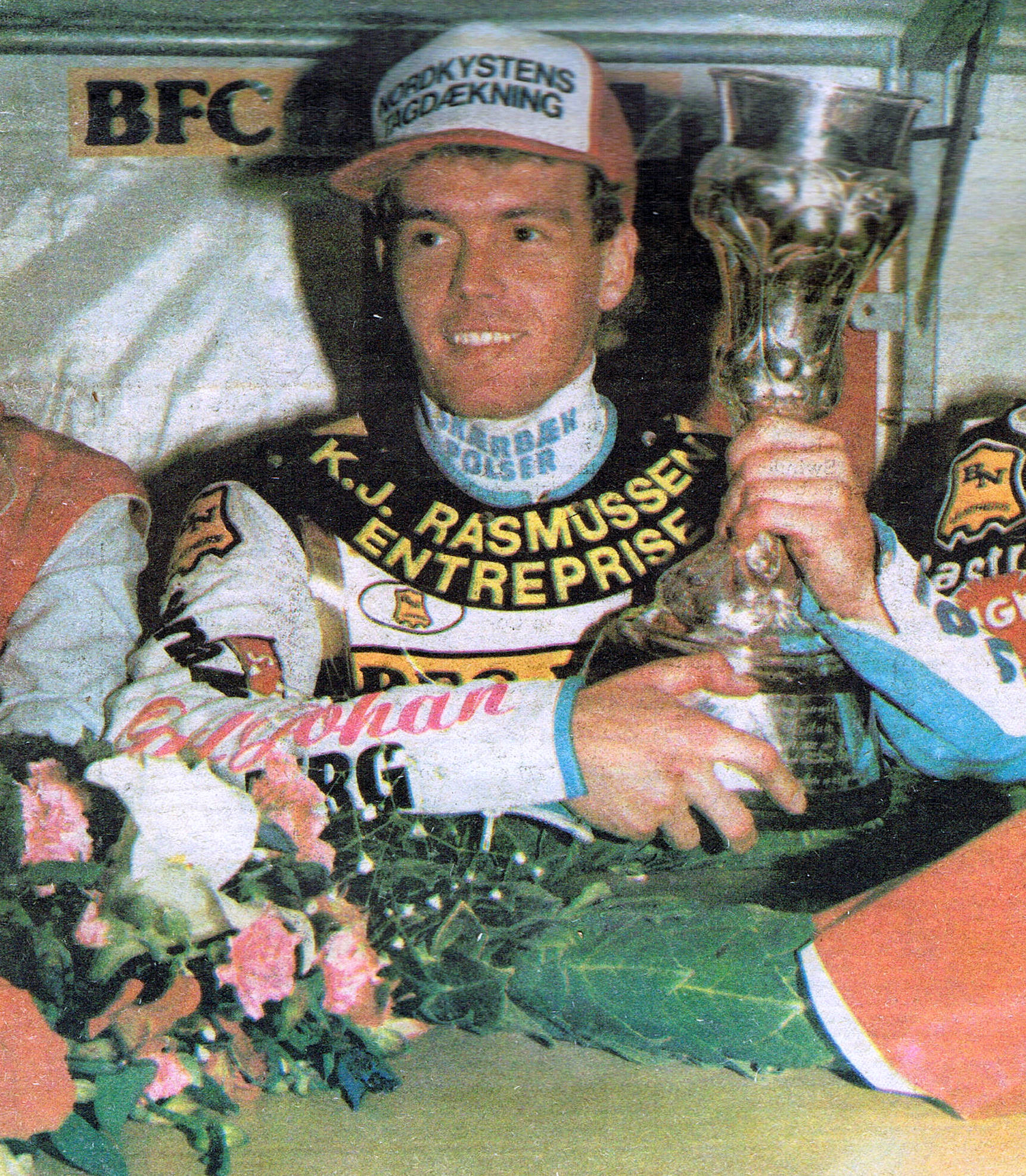
- Tommy Knudsen was the 1997 Danish champion

The 1997 Danish speedway season was the 1997 season of motorcycle speedway in Denmark.

== Individual ==
=== Individual Championship ===
The 1997 Danish Individual Speedway Championship was the 1997 edition of the Danish Individual Speedway Championship. The final was held at Holsted on 23 May. The title was won by Tommy Knudsen.

The Championship formed part of the 1998 Speedway Grand Prix Qualification with 5 riders qualifying for the Scandinavian Final.

Final

Pos.	Rider	Team	Total
1	Tommy Knudsen	Holstebro	14
2	Brian Karger	Holsted	14
3	Hans Nielsen	Brovst	12
4	Jesper B. Jensen	Holsted	11
5	John Jørgensen	Fjelsted	11
6	Brian Andersen	Slangerup	10
7	Ronni Pedersen	Herning	8
8	Frede Schött	Outrup	8
9	Hans Clausen	Holsted	7
10	Jan Stæchmann	Herning	7
11	Nicki Pedersen	Fjelsted	5
12	Martin Greve	Fjelsted	4
13	Robert Larsen	Slangerup	3
14	Ole Hansen	Holsted	3
15	Martin Vinther	Brovst	2
16	Bo Skov Eriksen	Holsted	0
17	Jacob Beierholm (res)	Slangerup	0
18	Kim Brandt (res)		0

Key - Each heat has four riders, 3 points for a heat win, 2 for 2nd, 1 for third and 0 for last

=== Junior Championship ===
Claus Kristensen won the Junior Championship.

== Team ==
=== Danish Superliga ===
The 1997 season was won by Holstebro for the first time.

Pos	Team	P	Pts
1	Holstebro	14	33
2	Holsted	14	28
3	Outrup	14	27
4	Slangerup	14	26
5	Herning	14	23
6	Fjelsted	14	16
7	Brovst	14	14
8	Kronjylland	14	0
