= 2000 Danish speedway season =

Season of speedway in Denmark

The 2000 Danish speedway season was the 2000 season of motorcycle speedway in Denmark.

== Individual ==
=== Individual Championship ===
The 2000 Danish Individual Speedway Championship was the 2000 edition of the Danish Individual Speedway Championship. The final was at Outrup on 26 May. The title was won by Brian Karger for the third time.

The Championship formed part of the 2001 Speedway Grand Prix Qualification with 5 riders qualifying for the Scandinavian Final.

Final

Pos.	Rider	Team	Total
1	Brian Karger	Slangerup	14
2	Brian Andersen	Herning	12
3	John Jørgensen	Odense	11
4	Jesper B. Jensen	Holsted	10
5	Nicki Pedersen	Brovst	10
6	Ronni Pedersen	Slangerup	10
7	Bjarne Pedersen	Holstebro	9
8	Frede Schött	Outrup	9
9	Hans Clausen	Outrup	8
10	Hans Andersen	Brovst	7
11	Henning Bager	Holsted	5
12	Bo Skov Eriksen	Herning	5
13	Gert Handberg	Brovst	4
14	Martin Vinther	Brovst	3
15	Brian Lyngsö	Slangerup	2
16	Tom P. Madsen	Holsted	2
17	Kim Pedersen	Outrup	0

Key - Each heat has four riders, 3 points for a heat win, 2 for 2nd, 1 for third and 0 for last

=== Junior Championship ===
Kenneth Bjerre won the Junior Championship.

== Team ==
=== Danish Superliga ===
The 2000 season was won by Brovst for the third time.

Odense, with no home track raced at the Munkebo Speedway Center. The previous season they had competed as a combined team with Fjelsted Speedway Klub but the latter pulled out due to financial issues.

Pos	Team	P	W	2nd	3rd	4th	Pts
1	Brovst	12	8	2	1	1	29
2	Holsted	12	7	2	2	1	27
3	Herning	12	2	6	4	0	22
4	Outrup	12	3	5	3	1	22
5	Slangerup	12	1	3	3	5	12
6	Holstebro	12	0	2	4	6	8
7	Odense	12	0	0	6	6	6

Play offs

Pos	Team	P	W	2nd	3rd	4th	Pts
1	Brovst	2	1	1	0	0	8
2	Herning	2	1	0	1	0	5
3	Holsted	2	0	1	0	1	4
4	Outrup	2	0	0	1	1	1

== Teams ==
Brovst

- Nicki Pedersen
- Hans Andersen
- Gert Handberg
- Martin Vinther
- Ulrich Ostergaard
- Krzysztof Jablonski

Herning

- Brian Andersen
- Bo Skov Eriksen
- Joonas Kylmäkorpi
- Sebastian Ulamek
- Thomas Damgard
- Ronnie Rene Henningsen
- Stefan Andersson
- Kenneth Bjerre

Holstebro

- Bjarne Pedersen
- Tomasz Bajerski
- Martin Greve
- Daniel Nermark
- Jan Jakobsen
- Frederik Pettersson

Holsted

- Jesper B. Jensen
- Henning Bager
- Tom P. Madsen
- Björn Gustafsson
- Matthias Kröger
- Niels Kristian Iversen

Odense

- John Jørgensen
- Slawomir Drabik
- Mike Johnsen
- Mariusz Staszewski
- Peder Frederiksen

Outrup

- Hans Clausen
- Frede Schött
- Kim Pedersen
- Kenneth Sörensen
- Rune Holta
- Jesper Steentoft

Slangerup

- Brian Karger
- Ronni Pedersen
- Brian Lyngsö
- Marcus Johansson
- Jesper Olsen
- Kim Brandt
