= Brovst Speedway Center =

Motorcycle speedway stadium near Brovst, Denmark

- Location: Over Søen 12, 9460 Brovst, Denmark
- Coordinates: 57°07′36″N 9°30′08″E
- Opened: 1973
- Length: 300 m (0.19 mi)

Brovst Speedway Center also known as the Nordjylland Speedway Center is a speedway track near Brovst in Denmark. The track is located on the Over Søen road, off the Bratbjerg road, about 4 kilometres north of Brovst, and 1 kilometre south of Bratbjerg. The stadium hosted the speedway team Brovst Speedway Club, who previously raced in the Danish Speedway League and were three times champions of Denmark.

== History ==
The Han Herreds Motor Klub were founded in 1957 but it was not until 1973 that the club decided to build a speedway track in an area known as Mou Kær. When it opened it was known as the Han Herred Speedway Center and the team raced as Hanerne Hanherred in the Danish league.

The stadium was a venue for important events, including the Danish Individual Speedway Championship in 1984 and 1988 and the Danish final, as part of the qualifying for the Speedway World Championship in 1985

In 1992, the Brovst Speedway Club separated from the Han Herreds Motor Klubb, which continued as a moto cross club. The speedway team went on to become champions of Denmark after winning the Danish league in 1990, 1998 and 2000. The legendary Hans Nielsen was instrumental in making Brovst a notable speedway club and venue.
