= Erik Kastebo =

Danish speedway rider (1935–2019)

- Born: 23 September 1935; Denmark
- Died: 11 November 2019 (aged 84)
- Nationality: Danish

Individual honours
- 1959, 1965: Danish Champion

Erik Kastebo (1935–2019) was an international speedway rider from Denmark.

== Speedway career ==
Kastebo was a two-time champion of Denmark, winning the Danish Championship in 1959 and 1965.

Kastebo was also a noted grasstrack rider, winning the Danish championship.
