= Kiehn Berthelsen =

Danish speedway rider (born 1925)

- Born: 8 May 1925; Denmark
- Nationality: Danish

Career history
- 1952: Norwich Stars

Individual honours
- 1951, 1953, 1955: Danish Champion

Kiehn Berthelsen (born 8 May 1925) is a Danish former international speedway rider. He earned 13 caps for the Denmark national speedway team.

== Speedway career ==
Berthelsen was a champion of Denmark, winning the Danish Championship on three occasions in 1951, 1953 and 1955.

In 1952, Belle Vue Aces unsuccessfully attempted to sign Berthelsen before he joined Norwich Stars, riding in the top tier of British Speedway.
