= Bent Jensen (speedway rider) =

Danish speedway rider

- Born: 1908; Denmark
- Died: Unknown
- Nationality: Danish

Individual honours
- 1948: Danish Champion

Bent Jensen (1908 – date of death unknown) was a Danish former international speedway rider.

== Speedway career ==
Jensen was a champion of Denmark, winning the Danish Championship in 1948.

Jensen was part of a famous motorsport family with three brothers NV Jensen, Svend Jensen and CO Jensen.
