= Outrup Speedway Center =

Speedway stadium in Outrup, Denmark

- Location: Hennevej 35, 6855 Outrup, Denmark
- Coordinates: 55°42′37″N 8°19′31″E
- Opened: 3 July 1976

The Outrup Speedway Center is a motorcycle speedway stadium and track about 1.5 kilometres southwest of Outrup.

The venue is used by the Outrup Speedway Club and the speedway team Region Varde Elitesport, who compete in the Danish Speedway League.

== History ==
In 1961, a short lived club called Outrup Motor Sport was formed, and they built a small dirt track described as being part of the Blåbjerg Klitplantage (dune plantations). Although the club soon folded, the track location remained. It was this site that the Outrup Speedway Club (founded in November 1973) chose for the construction of a full size speedway track. After much work the new speedway track was opened on 3 July 1976.

During the 1980s, the track needed renovation in order for the licensing of international events to be granted by the Fédération Internationale de Motocyclisme. The decision was taken to build a new track adjacent to the existing one to ensure that the necessary specifications could be achieved. The new track opened during 1986, which coincided with the new Danish Superliga, a new professional league tournament. Previously, the league consisted of multiple amateur teams and Danish speedway suffered from the fact that many of their top professional riders chose not to race in Denmark.

The venue has hosted significant speedway events including:

- 2003 Speedway World Cup Race-off
- multiple Danish Individual Speedway Championship finals
- multiple Danish World Championship qualifying finals
