= Bent Jensen (businessman) =

Danish businessman

- Born: 1951 or 1952 (age 73–74)
- Education: University of Southern Denmark
- Known for: Owner and CEO, Linak

Bent Jensen (born 1951/1952) is a Danish billionaire businessman, and the owner and CEO of Linak, a Danish linear actuator manufacturing company.

== Early life ==
Jensen earned a degree in mechanical engineering from the University of Southern Denmark. Jensen's grandfather founded Christian Jensen and Sons in 1907, and it originally produced pulleys, grinding mills and forges.

== Career ==
In 1976, Jensen took over the running of the company from his father, when there were just seven employees. In 1979, he started to make linear actuators, which became the company's main product.

In 1984, the company was renamed Linak.

== Personal life ==
Jensen lives in Nordborg, Denmark.
