= Slangerup Speedway Center =

Motorcycle speedway venue in Slangerup, Denmark

- Location: Hørup Skovvej 5A, 3550 Slangerup, Denmark
- Coordinates: 55°50′38″N 12°8′59″E
- Owner: Frederikssund Municipality
- Opened: 1967
- Major events: motorcycle speedway

Oval
- Length: 0.34 km (0.21 mi)

Slangerup Speedway Center is a motorcycle speedway facility located on the western outskirts of Slangerup, Denmark. The track is on the Hørup Skovvej road. The stadium is the home track for the Slangerup Speedway Klub.

== History ==
The track opened in the early 1970s and hosted the speedway clubs Kulsvierne (the Charcoalers), Drabanterne (The Guardsmen) and Skovtroldene (The Forest Trolls).

On 22 May 1977, a second smaller moped track opened. In 1993, the Speedway Center hosted a round of the 1993 Speedway World Team Cup.

In 2023, the Danish Individual Speedway Championship was held at Slangerup for the fifth time in its history.
