= Holsted =

- Town
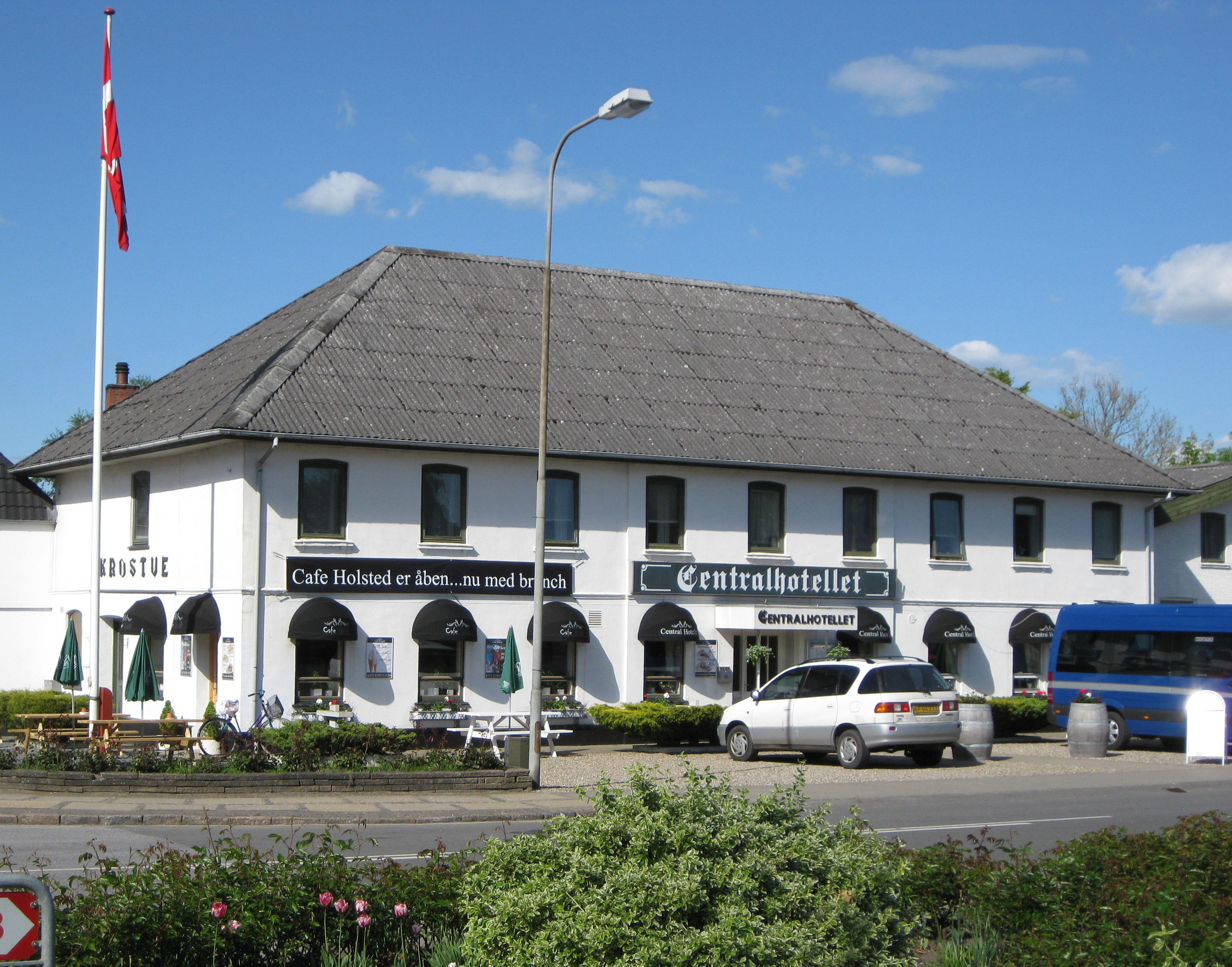
- The hotel "Centralhotellet"

- Location in Denmark Holsted (Region of Southern Denmark)
- Coordinates: 55°30′37″N 8°55′4″E
- Country: Denmark
- Region: Region of Southern Denmark
- Municipality: Vejen Municipality

Area
  - Urban: 2.9 km^{2} (1.1 sq mi)

Population (2026)
  - Urban: 3,034
  - Urban density: 1,000/km^{2} (2,700/sq mi)
- Time zone: UTC+1 (CET)
  - Summer (DST): UTC+2 (CEST)
- Postal code: DK-6670 Holsted

Holsted is a railway town in Vejen Municipality, Region of Southern Denmark in Denmark. It is situated at the stream of Holsted Å, 8 km west of Brørup.

Holsted was the seat of Holsted Municipality until 1 January 2007.

Holsted consist of two districts, the original village of Holsted on the north at Holsted Å and Holsted Stationsby on the south at the railway station. Now the two districts have merged making Holsted an elongated town with a distance of 4 km from north to south.

== Churches ==
There are two churches in Holsted.

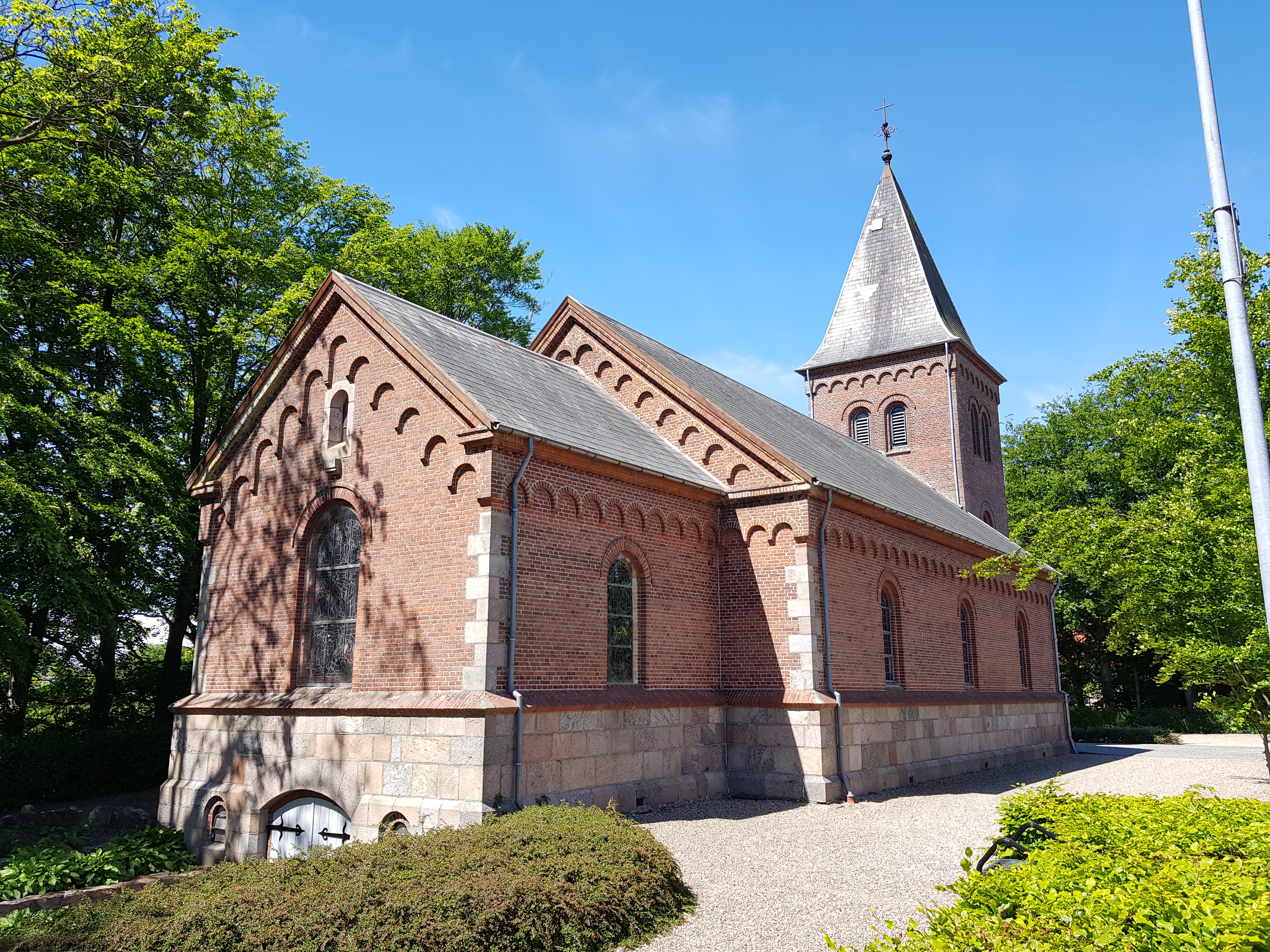
Holsted Church

Holsted Church is located to the north in the original village of Holsted just north of Holsted Å. The old church of Holsted was located where the churchyard is placed today.

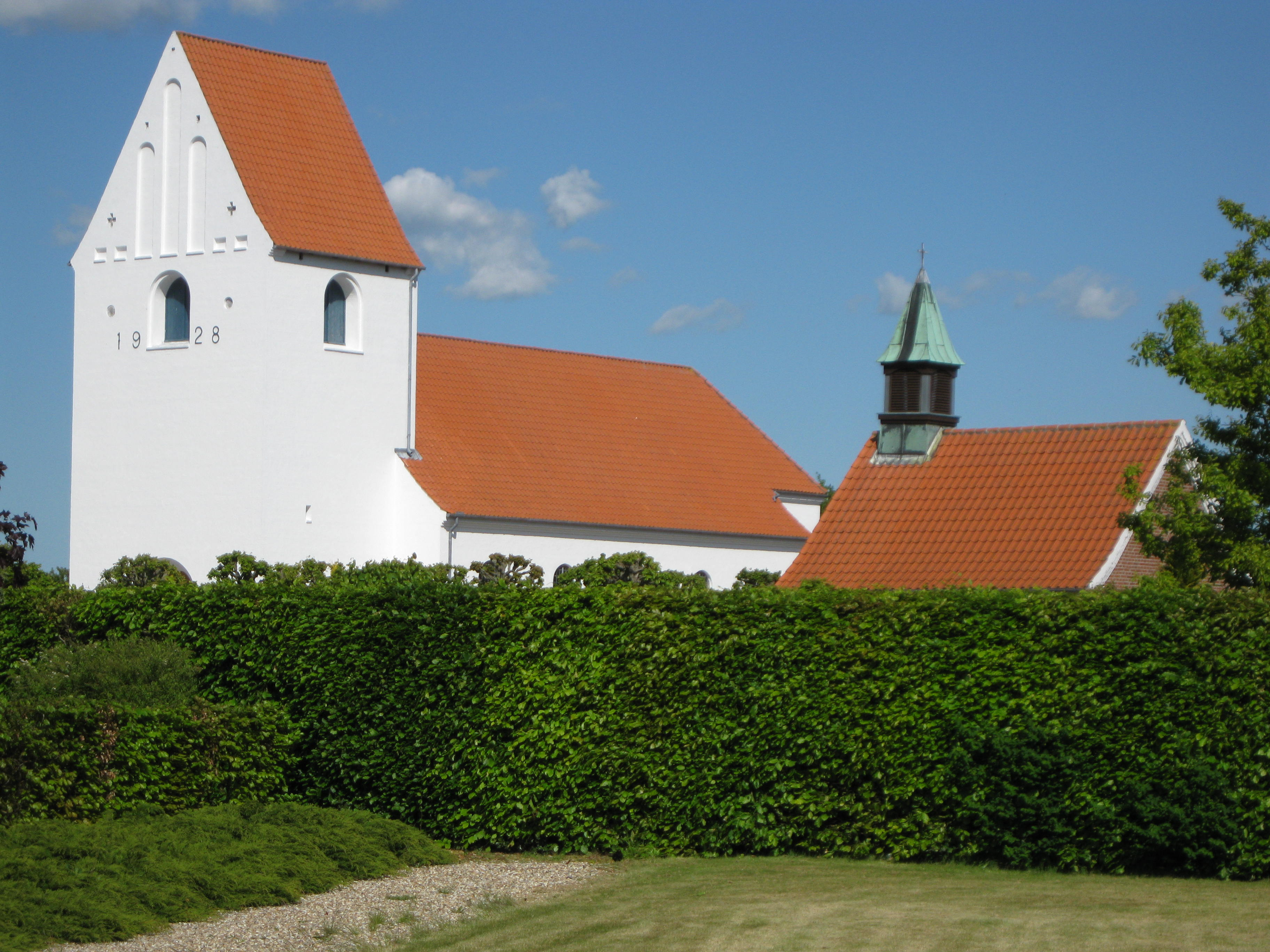
Sct. Peders Church

Sct. Peders Church, built in the years 1927–28, is located to the south in Holsted Stationsby.

== Transportation ==
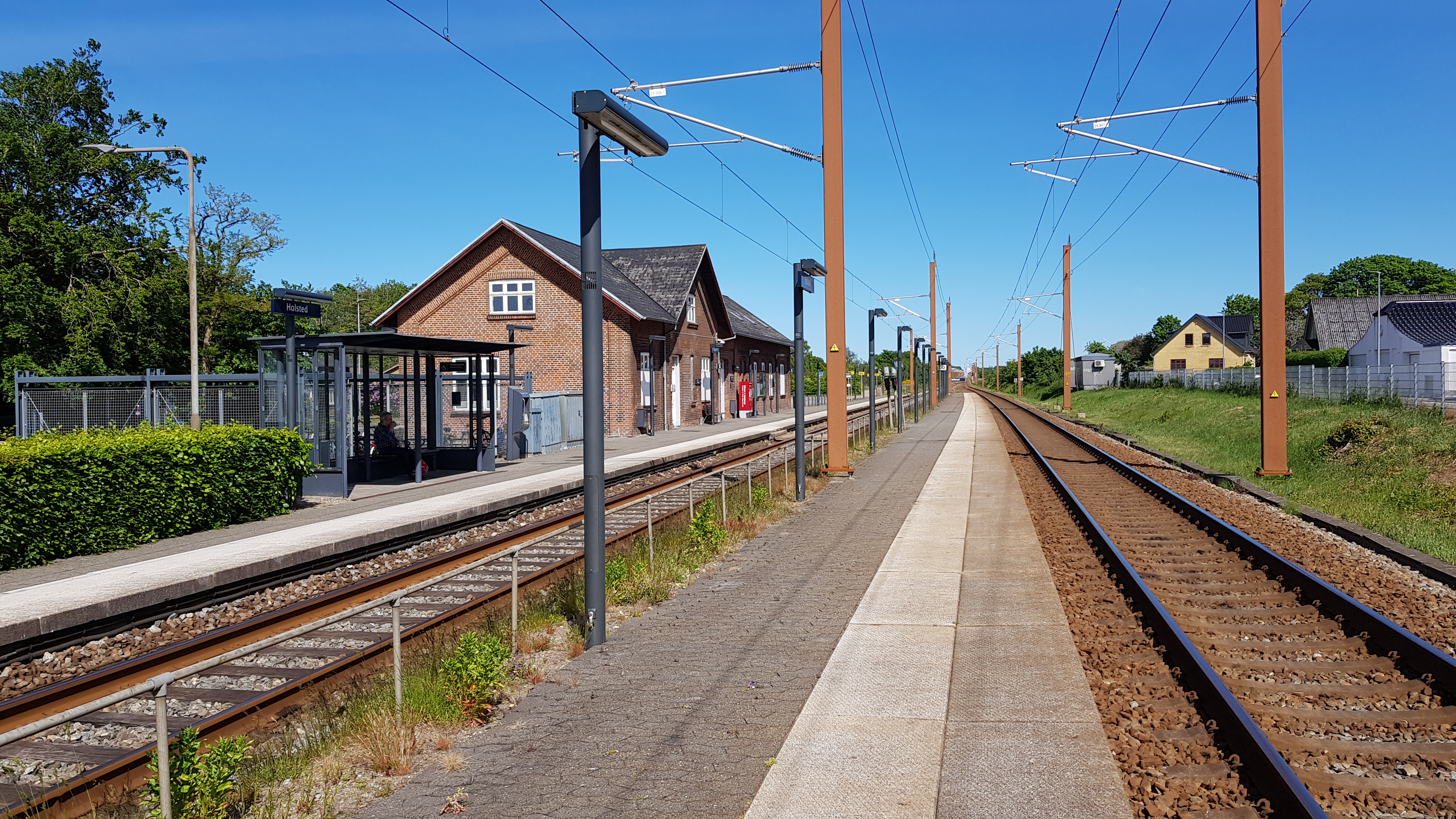
Holsted railway station.

Holsted is near the Esbjerg Motorway, a part of the European route E20, 34 km from Esbjerg and 39 km from Kolding. It is served by Holsted railway station, on the Lunderskov–Esbjerg railway line.

== Sport ==
Holsted Speedway Klub known as the Holsted Tigers race in the Danish Super League and are based at the Holsted Speedway Center, south of Holsted at Hedevejen 1, 6670. The Center opened on 4 June 1989, replacing the old Holsted Gørklint speedway track, which was located next to the Holsted Å at (55°30′17″N 8°53′03″E).

== Notable people ==
- Kræsten Iversen (1886 in the parish of Holsted - 1955) a Danish artist of paintings and painted glass windows; a member of the Bornholm school of painters and a professor at the Royal Danish Academy of Fine Arts.
- Martha Christensen (1926 in Holsted – 1995) a Danish writer.
- Trine Jepsen (born 1977 in Holsted) a Danish singer, actress and TV presenter, sang in a duo at the Eurovision Song Contest 1999.
