= Esbjerg Athletic Stadium =

Multi-use sports stadium in Esbjerg, Denmark

- Owner: Esbjerg Municipality
- Operator: Sport & Event Park Esbjerg

Construction
- Built: 1948

The Esbjerg Athletic Stadium (Danish: Esbjerg Atletikstadion), is an athletics stadium located within Esbjerg Idrætspark in Esbjerg, Denmark.

== History ==
The Esbjerg Idrætspark (sports park) was founded in 1926 and a football pitch, with a running track and area for shot put, high jump, pole vault and long jump, opened on 22 September 1929.

In 1948, Esbjerg Athletic Stadium was constructed and opened inside the sports park. Meanwhile, during 1951, the reconstruction of the football stadium began.

A motorcycle speedway track was located around the centre arena of the athletics stadium between 1951 and 1969 and it was the venue for final of the Danish Individual Speedway Championship in 1960, 1966 and 1968.

In 1983, the athletics club built a clubhouse and two years later the cinder track was converted into a synthetic surface. In 1993, it became Denmark's first eight lane athletics track.
