= Holsted Speedway Center =

Motorcycle speedway venue in Holsted, Denmark

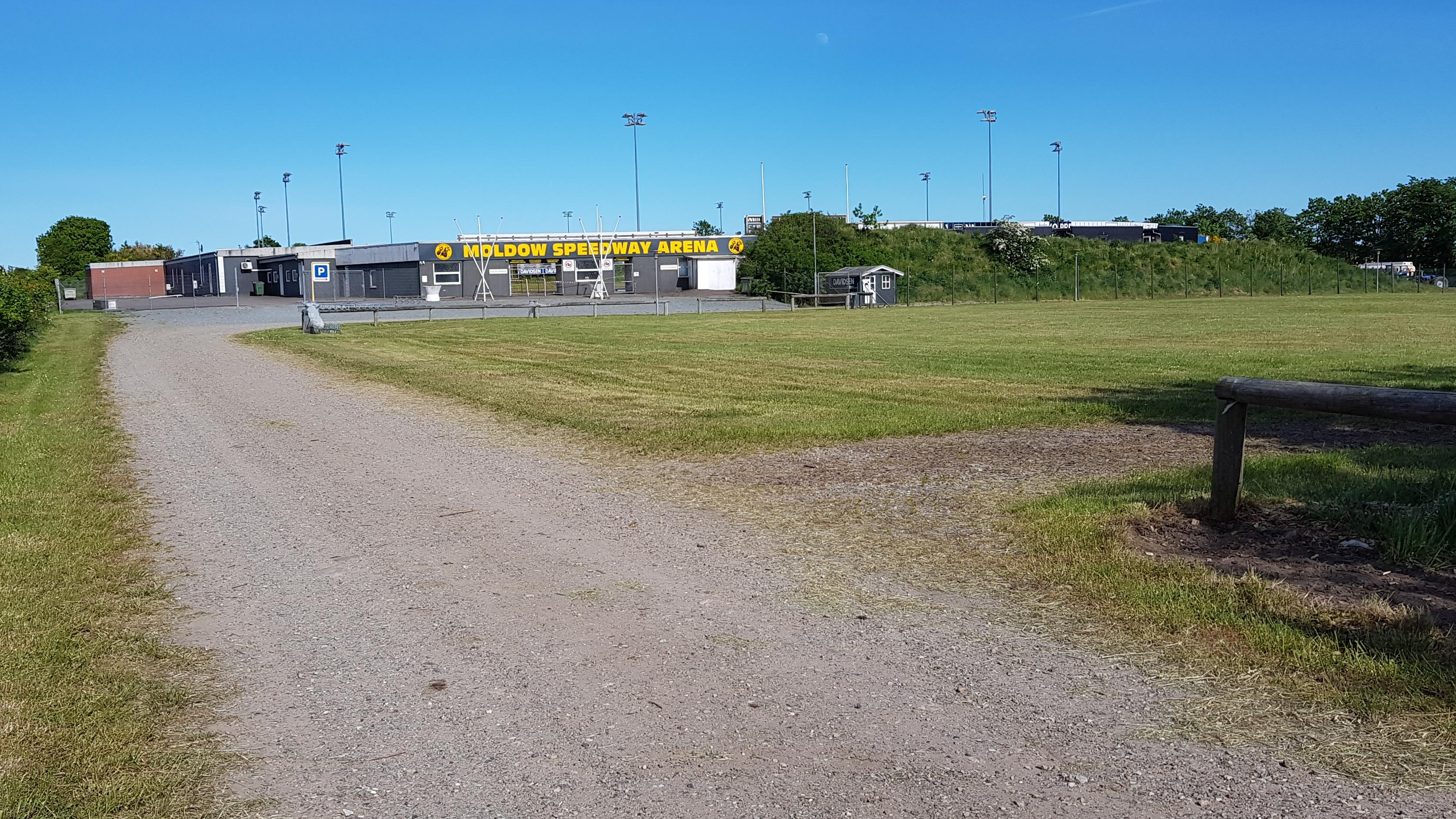
- Location: Hedevejen 1, 6670 Holsted, Denmark
- Coordinates: 55°27′54″N 8°54′47″E
- Opened: 4 June 1989
- Major events: motorcycle speedway

Oval
- Length: 0.300 km

Holsted Speedway Center or Moldow Speedway Arena is a motorcycle speedway facility located about 6 kilometres south of Holsted, Denmark. The track is off the Ribevej road that runs south from railway town. The stadium is the home track for the Holsted Tigers, who race in the Danish Speedway Leagues.

== History ==
The track opened on 4 June 1989, replacing the old Holsted Gørklint Speedway track.

On 28 July 1996, the arena hosted the 1996 Intercontinental final and the 2000 Intercontinental final, before being selected for a round of the 2003 Speedway World Cup.

In 2022, the Danish Individual Speedway Championship was held at the center for the 13th time in its history.
