= Outrup =

Town in Denmark

- Town
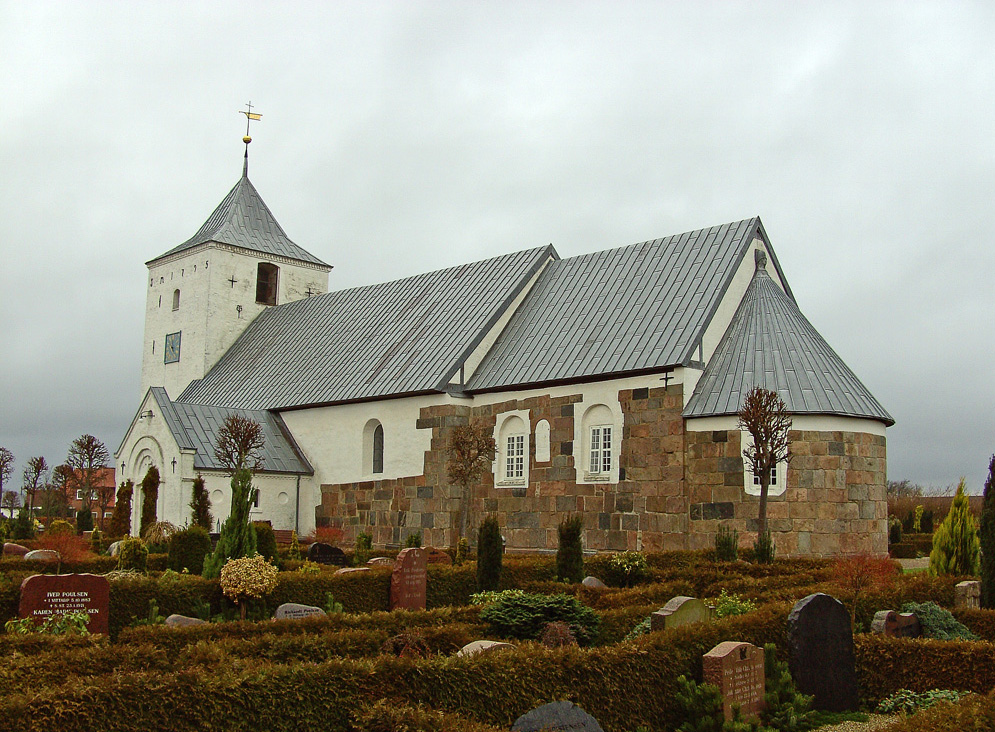
- Outrup Church

- Location in Region of Southern Denmark Outrup (Denmark)
- Coordinates: 55°43′8″N 8°20′21″E
- Country: Denmark
- Region: Southern Denmark
- Municipality: Varde Municipality

Area
  - Urban: 0.88 km^{2} (0.34 sq mi)

Population (2026)
  - Urban: 1,003
  - Urban density: 1,100/km^{2} (3,000/sq mi)
- Time zone: UTC+1 (CET)
  - Summer (DST): UTC+2 (CEST)
- Postal code: DK-6855 Outrup

Outrup (or Ovtrup) is a town in Varde Municipality in the Region of Southern Denmark. The town has a population of 1,003 (1 January 2026).

Outrup is a small rural town that reflects traditional Danish life. It has a quiet environment and basic services such as schools and small businesses.

== Sport ==
Region Varde Elitesport formerly the Outrup Speedway Club is a motorcycle speedway club southwest of Outrup, at the Outrup Speedway Center, Hennevej 35. They compete in the Danish Speedway League.
