= Bent Jensen (historian) =

Danish historian

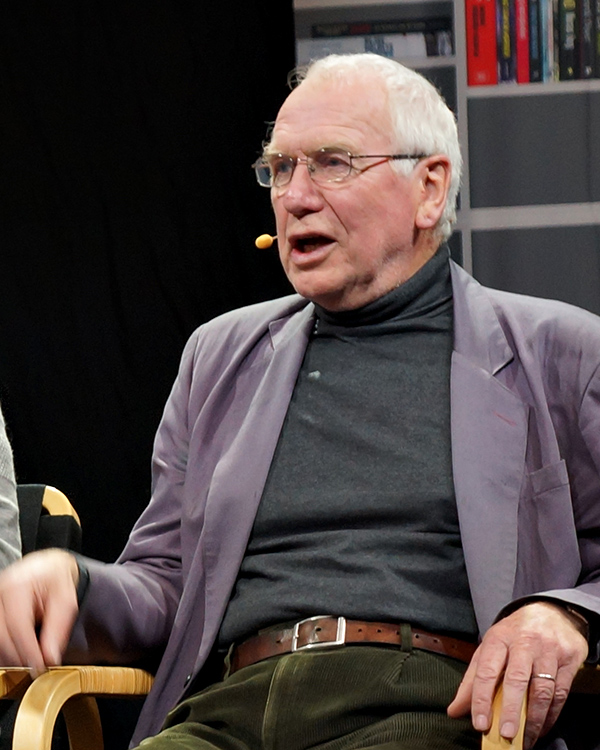
Image of Bent Jensen

Bent Jensen (born May 10, 1938, in Kjellerup) is a Danish historian, dr. phil. and professor emeritus. Bent Jensen was from 1980 to 2008 professor of modern history at the University of Southern Denmark. From 2007 to 2010 he was head of the Center for Cold War Research.

Bent Jensen's early research was mainly focused on the period around the establishment of the Soviet Union. He received his Dr.phil. on a thesis about the process in connection with Denmark's de jure recognition of the Soviet Union.

Later, Bent Jensen's writings focused on the issues of certain intellectuals' fascination with Stalinism (Stalinism's fascination and Danish left-wing intellectuals), the situation of Soviet dissidents (Sakharov's voice), the Social Democrats and footnote politics in the 1980s (Pressure and adaptation), the Soviet GULAG system and the persecution of dissenters as well as ethnic and other minorities in the Soviet Union (Gulag and oblivion), the Danish-Soviet relationship (The Bear and the Hare) and Denmark in the Cold War (Wolves, Sheep and Guardians). In 2014, he received the Niels Ebbesen Medal after previously declining the Knight's Cross.

== Head of the Center for Cold War Research ==
In January 2007, Bent Jensen was appointed head of the Center for Cold War Research, which was tasked with conducting an in-depth study of Denmark during the Cold War, as the center's task, according to the mission statement, was to carry out a free and broad research and dissemination effort regarding Denmark during the Cold War, with a special focus on, among other things, opinion formation and cultural influence. The center was established in 2005 by a majority in the Folketinget consisting of V, K and DF and was included in the budget agreement for 2007. The background for the establishment was criticism of a report from the Danish Institute for International Studies from 2005, especially regarding the report's assessments of the military threat to Denmark and the significance of footnote policy in the 1980s. The center closed on December 31, 2010, when the 3-year grant of DKK 10.5 million was exhausted. The center's work Wolves, Sheep and Guardians of 1,514 pages was published in February 2014.

== Honors ==
Bent Jensen has received the Kosan Prize (1985) and the Adam Smith Prize (2000) as well as the Kaj Munk Prize.

== Authorship ==
Bent Jensen has written a large number of books and articles.

In 2014 the two-volume work Wolves, Sheep and Guardians was published with a total of 1,514 pages. The work is based on the research program that Bent Jensen was hired to carry out when he was appointed head of the Center for Cold War Research. One of the themes in the work is the Footnote policy and its consequences, which according to journalist Kristoffer Zøllner from Berlingske appears as a symbol of "... a struggle for values with the Danish People's Party, the Danish People's Party and Bent Jensen's Center for Cold War Studies on the one hand, and the left wing, the Danish Institute for International Studies and Jørgen Dragsdahl on the other." Bent Jensen considers the footnote policy to have been very damaging to Denmark's reputation in NATO and to have posed a risk to the country's security during the Cold War.

=== Selected publications ===
- Tzar's Murder" - Harald Scavenius' view of the upheavals in Russia 1917–1918 1973 (Zarmod* Harald Scavenius' syn på omvæltningerne i Rusland 1917–1918 1973);
- Merchants and Commissars (1979) (Købmænd og kommissærer (1979).
- Denmark and the Russian Question 1917–1924. Danish Russian Policy from the Bolsheviks' Seizure of Power to the Recognition of the Bolshevik Regime de Jure; Jysk Selskab for History, Aarhus. Universitetsforlaget 1979) (disputats) (Danmark og det russiske spørgsmål 1917–1924. Dansk Ruslandspolitik fra bolsjevikkernes magterobring til anerkendelsen af det bolsjevikkiske regime de jure; Jysk Selskab for Historie, Århus. Universitetsforlaget 1979) (disputats)..
- Sakharov's Voice (1983) (Sakharovs stemme (1983).
- Stalinism's Fascination and Danish Left Intellectuals; Gyldendal (1984); ISBN 87-00-81912-3 (Stalinismens fascination og danske venstreintellektuelle; Gyldendal (1984); ISBN 87-00-81912-3).
- Pressure and Adaptation; Gyldendal (1987); ISBN 87-00-14774-5. (Tryk og tilpasning; Gyldendal (1987); ISBN 87-00-14774-5.)
- "Crime or Stupidity" (chronicle in Politiken January 21, 1992). ("Forbrydelse eller dumhed" (kronik i Politiken 21. januar 1992).)
- The New History of Russia (1992). (Den ny Ruslandshistorie (1992).)
- The Long Liberation (1996). (Den lange befrielse (1996).)
- Czar-Mothers among Tsar-Murderers. Dowager Empress Dagmar and Denmark 1917–1928; Gyldendal (1997). (Zarmoder blandt zarmordere. Enkekejserinde Dagmar og Danmark 1917–1928; Gyldendal (1997).
- The Bear and the Hare. The Soviet Union and Denmark 1945–1965; Odense University Press (1999); (Bjørnen og haren. Sovjetunionen og Danmark 1945–1965; Odense Universitetsforlag (1999);)
- Gulag and Oblivion (2002); ISBN 87-02-01388-6. (Gulag og glemsel (2002); ISBN 87-02-01388-6.)
- Stalin: a Biography; Gyldendal (2005). (Stalin: en biografi; Gyldendal (2005).)
- Wolves, sheep and guardians. The Cold War in Denmark 1945–1991, vol. 1–2, Gyldendal, 2014. (Ulve, får og vogtere. Den kolde krig i Danmark 1945–1991, bd. 1–2, Gyldendal, 2014.)
- The Fall of Russia. Revolutions and Collapse 1917–1921, Gyldendal 2017 (Ruslands Undergang. Revolutioner og sammenbrud 1917–1921, Gyldendal 2017) (Ruslands Undergang. Revolutioner og sammenbrud 1917–1921, Gyldendal 2017.)

=== Further reading ===
- Blåregnen, erindringsglimt omkring en krig, Forlaget Per Kofod, 1993, ISBN 87-89974-22-0
- Ellemann-Jensen, Uffe (2017). Som blad i høst: Mit liv efter politik. Lindhardt og Ringhof. ISBN 978-87-11-89712-6.
- Eskholm, Birgit (2017). Engell – et portræt. Lindhardt og Ringhof. ISBN 978-87-11-79778-5.
- Rüdiger, Mogens (1994) [1992]. På kant. Et portræt af politikeren Uffe Ellemann-Jensen. SAGA Egmont. ISBN 978-87-26-33106-6.
- Fogh, Krag, Schlüter og Stauning: Danmarks store statsmænd, Mads Qvortrup, Borgen, 2009. ISBN 978-87-21-03433-7.

== Reviews of Bent Jensen's writings ==
- Sven Henningsen (anmeldelse af: Bent Jensen: Danmark og det russiske spørgsmål 1917–1924. Dansk Ruslandspolitik fra bolsjevikkernes magterobring til anerkendelsen af det bolsjevikkiske regime de jure. Jysk Selskab for Historie, Århus. Universitetsforlaget 1979, i: Historisk Tidsskrift, Bind 14. række, 1; 1980)
- Henrik Skov Kristensen: Bornholms lange befrielse (anmeldelse af: Bent Jensen: Den lange befrielse. Bornholm besat og befriet 1945–1946. Odense Universitetsforlag, 1996; i: Historie/Jyske Samlinger, Bind 1997; 1997)
- Thorsten Borring Olesen og Nils Arne Sørensen: Spiser bjørne harer? (anmeldelse af: Bent Jensen: Bjørnen og haren. Sovjetunionen og Danmark 1945–1965. Odense Universitetsforlag, 1999, i: Historie/Jyske Samlinger, Bind 2000; 2000).
- Nikolaj Petersen (anmeldelse af: Bent Jensen: Stalinismens fascination og danske venstreintellektuelle, København: Gyldendal 1984, i: Politica, Bind 17; 1985)
- Nikolaj Petersen (anmeldelse af: Bent Jensen: Tryk og tilpasning. Sovjetunionen og Danmark siden 2. verdenskrig. Gyldendal, 1987; i: Historie/Jyske Samlinger, Ny række, Bind 18; 1989)

=== External links ===
- Bent Jensen: "Dansk-russiske relationer 1697–1709" (Historie/Jyske Samlinger, Bind Ny Række, 8; 1968, s. 397–465).
- Bent Bensen: "Oktoberrevolutionen og danske erhvervsinteresser i Rusland" (i: Historie/Jyske Samlinger, Ny række, 10; Bind 1972, s. 185–242).
- Bent Jensen: "Totalitarismeteorier" (Historisk Tidsskrift, 14. række, Bind 3; 1982)
- "To sager og et halvgjort arbejde" (kronik i "Jyllandsposten" 18. juli 2009
- "Én gang til for en sladretaske" (kronik i "Jyllandsposten" 26. november 2009)
