= 2011 Team Speedway Junior World Championship =

2011 speedway racing championship

Seasons
- ← 2010 2012 →

The 2011 Team Speedway Junior World Championship was the seventh FIM Team Under-21 World Championship season. The final took place on 3 September, 2011 at Balakovo in Russia. It was the first final in Russia. The defending Champions were Denmark.

== Results ==
As the 2011 Under-21 World Cup Final was staged in Russia, the Russian team was seeded directly into the Final. The other three finalists were to be determined in two Semi-Finals on May 28.

However, Sweden, who qualified for the Final by winning Semi-final 1, and Australia who qualified by winning Semi-final 2, both withdrew from the Final due to travel cost and visa problems. After both Poland and Finland declined to replace them, their places in the Final was taken by Ukraine and Czech Republic. Anticipating cost and visa problems, Great Britain declined to enter a team in the 2011 Junior World Cup.

On home soil, the Russians easily won their first Under-21 World Cup, scoring 61 points to claim a massive 30 point victory over reigning champions Denmark. Ukraine and Czech Republic finished tied on 29 points each with Ukraine's Aleksandr Loktaev defeating Václav Milík, Jr. in a runoff to decide third place.

- Qualifying Round
- (Ukraine) Rivne
- 1 May 2011

National team	Pts.
Ukraine	56
Finland	43
Slovenia	27
United States	20

- Semifinal 1
- (Poland) Rawicz
- 28 May 2011

National team	Pts.
Sweden	58
Poland	54
Ukraine	23
Czech Republic	14

- Semifinal 2
- (Germany) Diedenbergen
- 28 May 2011

National team	Pts.
Australia	63
Denmark	58
Finland	19
Germany	9

- Final
- (Russia) Trud Stadium, Balakovo
- 3 September 2011

National team	Pts.
Russia	61
Denmark	31
Ukraine	29+3
Czech Republic	29+2

== Heat details ==
=== Qualifying round ===
- 2 May 2011
- UKR Rivne
- Referee: (United Kingdom) Jim Lawrence
- Jury President: (Poland) Andrzej Grodzki
- References

Placing	Team / Rider name	Total	1	2	3	4	5	6	7	8	9	10	11	12	13	14	15	16	17	18	19	20	21	22	23	24	25
1	Ukraine	56	3	5	7	10	12	14	17	19	22	25	28	31	32	32	35	38	38	39	42	45	47	48	51	54	56
1	(1) Aleksandr Loktaev	15	3						3								3				3				3
1	(2) Andriej Kobrin	13		2						2			3									3				3
1	(3) Kirył Cykanow	13			2						3			3				3									2
1	(4) Stanisław Ogorodnik	9				3						3			1				0				2
1	(5) Witalij Łysak	6					2	2								X				1				1
2	Finland	43	1	1	4	4	7	10	11	12	14	16	18	20	23	24	24	26	27	30	31	33	36	39	41	42	43
2	(1) Timo Lahti	11	1								2				3							2		3
2	(2) Jari Makinen	7		R								2				1		2							2
2	(3) Niko Siltaniemi	8			3			3									0		1							1
2	(4) Kalle Katajisto	10				R			1				2							3			3				1
2	(5) Mika Loppi	7					3			1				2							1		-
Placing	Team / Rider name	Total	1	2	3	4	5	6	7	8	9	10	11	12	13	14	15	16	17	18	19	20	21	22	23	24	25
3	Slovenia	27	0	3	3	5	6	7	9	9	9	9	10	11	13	15	17	17	19	21	23	23	23	25	25	27	27
3	(1) Ladislav Vida	2	0					1					1					-					0
3	(2) Aleksander Čonda	12		3					2					1			2		2					2
3	(3) Matic Ivacic	4			0					0					2					2					F
3	(4) Nejc Malesic	8				2					-					2		Fx			2					2
3	(5) Ziga Radkovic	1					1					0					-					F					0
4	United States	20	2	3	4	4	4	4	4	7	8	9	9	9	9	12	13	13	16	16	16	16	17	17	17	17	20
4	(1) Ricky Wells	14	2							3						3			3								3
4	(2) Mike Buman	4		1							1						1			0			1			0
4	(3) Bryce Starks	2			1							1	0								T			0
4	(4) Austin Novratil	0				Fx		R						0								M			F
4	(5) Ricky Felicio	0					0		0						0			N								-
Placing	Team / Rider name	Total	1	2	3	4	5	6	7	8	9	10	11	12	13	14	15	16	17	18	19	20	21	22	23	24	25

M - exclusion for exceeding two minute time allowance • T - exclusion for touching the tapes • X - other exclusion • E - retired or mechanical failure • F - fell

Helmet colours were permanent for each team (red, blue, white and yellow/black). Colours in tables show gate positions:
gate A – inside	gate B	gate C	gate D – outside

=== Semifinal 1 ===
- 28 May 2011
- POL Rawicz
- Referee: (United Kingdom) Craig Ackroyd
- Jury President: (United States) David Joiner
- Attendance: 1,200
- References

Placing	Team / Rider name	Total	1	2	3	4	5	6	7	8	9	10	11	12	13	14	15	16	17	18	19	20	21	22	23	24	25
1	Sweden	58	3	5	6	8	11	13	16	19	21	23	25	28	31	34	37	40	43	44	46	48	50	50	53	56	58
1	(1) Dennis Andersson	14	3							3						3			3								2
1	(2) Simon Gustafsson (c)	10		2							2						3			1			2
1	(3) Ludvig Lindgren	7			1							2	2								2			Fx
1	(4) Kim Nilsson	12				2		2						3								2			3
1	(5) Linus Sundström	15					3		3						3			3								3
2	Poland	54	2	5	7	10	12	15	17	19	22	25	28	30	30	30	32	33	35	37	40	43	44	47	49	51	54
2	(1) Patryk Dudek	11	2						2								2				3				2
2	(2) Przemysław Pawlicki	13		3						2			3									3				2
2	(3) Maciej Janowski (c)	11			2						3			2				1									3
2	(4) Bartosz Zmarzlik	9				3						3			0				2				1
2	(5) Piotr Pawlicki, Jr.	10					2	3								R2				2				3
Placing	Team / Rider name	Total	1	2	3	4	5	6	7	8	9	10	11	12	13	14	15	16	17	18	19	20	21	22	23	24	25
3	Ukraine	23	0	1	4	5	5	5	5	6	6	7	8	9	10	12	12	14	15	18	18	18	21	22	23	23	23
3	(1) Kiril Tsukanov (c)	3	0					Fx					1				0	2					-
3	(2) Andriy Kobrin	4		1					0					1					1					1
3	(3) Aleksandr Loktaev	12			3					1					1					3			3		1
3	(4) Volodymyr Teygel	3				1					0					2					0					0
3	(5) Stanislav Ogorodnik	1					0					1					-					0					0
4	Czech Republic	14	1	1	1	1	2	2	3	3	4	4	5	5	7	8	8	8	8	8	9	10	10	12	12	13	14
4	(1) Michael Hádek (c)	7	1								1				2							1		2
4	(2) Roman Čejka	1		0								0				1		0							0
4	(3) Jan Holub III	1			0			Fx									0		0							1
4	(4) Václav Milík, Jr.	3				0			1				1							0							1
4	(5) Michal Dudek	2					1			0				0							1		0
Placing	Team / Rider name	Total	1	2	3	4	5	6	7	8	9	10	11	12	13	14	15	16	17	18	19	20	21	22	23	24	25

M - exclusion for exceeding two minute time allowance • T - exclusion for touching the tapes • X - other exclusion • E - retired or mechanical failure • F - fell

Helmet colours were permanent for each team (red, blue, white and yellow/black). Colours in tables show gate positions:
gate A – inside	gate B	gate C	gate D – outside

=== Semifinal 2 ===
- 28 May 2011
- GER Diedenbergen
- Referee: (Poland) Marek Wojaczek
- Jury President: (United Kingdom) Anthony Steele
- References

Placing	Team / Rider name	Total	1	2	3	4	5	6	7	8	9	10	11	12	13	14	15	16	17	18	19	20	21	22	23	24	25
1	Australia	63	3	5	8	10	13	16	19	21	23	26	29	32	32	35	38	40	43	46	48	50	53	56	59	60	63
1	(1) Josh Grajczonek	14	3						3								3				2				3
1	(2) Richard Sweetman	10		2						2			3									2				1
1	(3) Sam Masters	13			3						2			3				2									3
1	(4) Justin Sedgmen	11				2						3			0				3				3
1	(5) Darcy Ward	15					3	3								3				3				3
2	Denmark	58	2	5	7	10	12	14	16	19	22	24	25	27	30	32	34	37	39	41	44	47	49	51	53	56	58
2	(1) Michael Jepsen Jensen (c)	13	2								3				3							3		2
2	(2) Mikkel B. Jensen	12		3								2				2		3							2
2	(3) Michael Palm Toft	11			2			2									2		2							3
2	(4) Jonas Andersen	10				3			2				1							2							2
2	(5) Lasse Bjerre	12					2			3				2							3		2
Placing	Team / Rider name	Total	1	2	3	4	5	6	7	8	9	10	11	12	13	14	15	16	17	18	19	20	21	22	23	24	25
3	Finland	19	1	2	2	2	3	3	4	4	5	6	6	7	8	9	10	11	12	13	14	15	16	17	17	19	19
3	(1) Kalle Katajisto	3	1							R			R			1			1								0
3	(2) Jari Makinen	6		1							1						1			1			1	1
3	(3) Niko Siltaniemi	0			F/N							-	-								-			-
3	(4) Mika Loppi	3				0		0				1		1								1			0
3	(5) Timo Lahti (c)	7					1		1						1			1			1					2
4	Germany	9	0	0	0	1	1	2	2	3	3	3	5	5	7	7	7	7	7	7	7	7	7	7	8	8	9
4	(1) Kai Huckenbeck (c)	3	0					1					2					T	F				0
4	(2) Marcel Helfer	0		0					0					0					-					0
4	(3) Danny Maassen	4			X					1					2					0					1
4	(4) Michel Hofmann	1				1					0					0					0					0
4	(5) Andre Mochner	1					0					Fx					0					0					1
Placing	Team / Rider name	Total	1	2	3	4	5	6	7	8	9	10	11	12	13	14	15	16	17	18	19	20	21	22	23	24	25

M - exclusion for exceeding two minute time allowance • T - exclusion for touching the tapes • X - other exclusion • E - retired or mechanical failure • F - fell

Helmet colours were permanent for each team (red, blue, white and yellow/black). Colours in tables show gate positions:
gate A – inside	gate B	gate C	gate D – outside

=== Final ===
- 3 September 2011
- RUS Balakovo
- Stadion Trud (Length: 380 m)
- Referee: (Hungary) Istvan Darago

Placing	Team / Rider name	Total	1	2	3	4	5	6	7	8	9	10	11	12	13	14	15	16	17	18	19	20	21	22	23	24	25
1.	Russia	61	1	4	5	8	11	14	17	20	23	26	27	30	31	33	36	39	42	45	48	50	52	55	58	61	61
1.	(1) Andrey Kudryashov (c)	10	1					3					1					3					2
1.	(2) Artem Laguta	15		3					3					3					3					3
1.	(3) Vitaly Belousov	11			1					3					1					3					3
1.	(4) Ilya Chalov	14				3					3					2					3					3
1.	(5) Vladimir Borodulin	11					3					3					3					2					E
2.	Denmark	31	0	2	2	4	6	6	6	6	6	7	9	10	10	11	13	15	17	19	20	23	24	25	27	28	31
2.	(1) René Bach (c)	1	0								0	1			F							-		-
2.	(2) Mikkel Bech	8		2								-				1		2						1	2
2.	(3) Jonas Andersen	5			0			0									2		2							1
2.	(4) Michael Jepsen Jensen	12				2			0				2							2		3					3
2.	(5) Mikkel Michelsen	5					2			0				1							1		1
Placing	Team / Rider name	Total	1	2	3	4	5	6	7	8	9	10	11	12	13	14	15	16	17	18	19	20	21	22	23	24	25
3.	Ukraine	29	3	3	6	6	6	7	8	10	11	13	16	16	19	22	22	22	22	22	24	24	24	26	27	27	29
3.	(1) Kiril Tsukanov (c)	10	3							2						3			0			F					2
3.	(2) Andriy Kobrin	1		0							1						0			E			F			0
3.	(3) Aleksandr Loktaev	15			3							2	3		3						2			2
3.	(4) Volodymyr Teygel	2				0		1						X								-			1
3.	(5) Stanislav Melnichuk	1					0		1						-			0								-
4.	Czech Republic	29	2	3	5	6	7	9	11	12	14	14	14	16	18	18	19	20	21	22	22	23	26	26	26	28	29
4.	(1) Michael Hádek (c)	5	2						2								1				0				0
4.	(2) Jan Holub III	5		1						1			0									1				2
4.	(3) Václav Milík, Jr.	11			2						2			2				1					3				1
4.	(4) Roman Čejka	4				1						0			2				1				-
4.	(5) Michal Dudek	4					1	2								0				1				0
Placing	Team / Rider name	Total	1	2	3	4	5	6	7	8	9	10	11	12	13	14	15	16	17	18	19	20	21	22	23	24	25

M - exclusion for exceeding two minute time allowance • T - exclusion for touching the tapes • X - other exclusion • E - retired or mechanical failure • F - fell

Helmet colours were permanent for each team (red, blue, white and yellow/black). Colours in tables show gate positions:
gate A – inside	gate B	gate C	gate D – outside

== See also ==
- 2011 Speedway World Cup
- 2011 Individual Speedway Junior World Championship
