= 2012 Team Speedway Junior World Championship =

Motorcycle racing competition

Seasons
- ← 2011 2013 →

The 2012 Team Speedway Junior World Championship was the eighth FIM Team Under-21 World Championship season. The final took place on 1 September, 2012 in Poland.

== Results ==
In the 2012 Final will be the host team Poland. Another finalist will be determined in two Semi-Finals in May.

== Heat details ==
=== Qualifying round ===
- 21 April, 2012
- (Ukraine) Rivne

Placing	Team / Rider name	Total	1	2	3	4	5	6	7	8	9	10	11	12	13	14	15	16	17	18	19	20	21	22	23	24	25
1	Czech Republic	53	0	3	5	5	8	11	13	13	14	17	20	23	24	26	29	31	34	37	38	40	43	45	47	50	53
1	(1) Roman Cejka	11	0					3					3					2					3
1	(2) Eduard Krčmář	13		3					2					3					3					2
1	(3) Ondrej Veverka	8			2					E					1					3					2
1	(4) Zdenek Holub	7				X					1					2					1					3
1	(5) Václav Milík Jr.	14					3					3					3					2					3
2	Ukraine	52	3	5	8	11	11	13	16	19	22	24	24	26	29	32	32	35	35	36	38	41	43	46	49	50	52
2	(1) Aleksandr Loktaev	15	3								3				3							3		3
2	(2) Kirill Tsukanov	13		2								2				3		3							3
2	(3) Stanislav Melnechuk	6			3			2									0		0							1
2	(4) Vladimir Teygal	9				3			3				E							1							2
2	(5) Andrey Kobrin	9					F			3				2							2		2
Placing	Team / Rider name	Total	1	2	3	4	5	6	7	8	9	10	11	12	13	14	15	16	17	18	19	20	21	22	23	24	25
3	Slovenia	23	1	1	1	1	3	4	5	5	5	6	7	8	10	10	12	13	15	15	18	18	19	19	20	22	23
3	(1) Matic Ivačič	9	1						1								2				3				1		1
3	(2) Kristian Revinsek	3		0						F			1									0				2
3	(3) Ziga Radkovic	2			F						0			1				1									-
3	(4) Nejc Malesic	6				X						1			2				2				1
3	(5) Ladislav Vida	3					2	1								0				0				0
4	United States	19	2	3	3	5	6	6	6	8	10	10	12	12	12	13	14	14	15	17	17	18	18	19	19	19	19
4	(1) Gino Manzares	7	2							2						1			1			1					0
4	(2) Bryce Starks	6		1							2			0			1			2			0
4	(3) Michael Buman	3			E							0	2								0			1
4	(4) Russel Green	2				2		0						-								-			0
4	(5) Dylan Black	1					1		0						E			0								F
Placing	Team / Rider name	Total	1	2	3	4	5	6	7	8	9	10	11	12	13	14	15	16	17	18	19	20	21	22	23	24	25

M - exclusion for exceeding two minute time allowance • T - exclusion for touching the tapes • X - other exclusion • E - retired or mechanical failure • F - fell

Helmet colours were permanent for each team (red, blue, white and yellow/black). Colours in tables show gate positions:
gate A – inside	gate B	gate C	gate D – outside

=== Semifinal 1 ===
- 27 May, 2012
- GBR Purfleet, Arena Essex Raceway

Placing	Team / Rider name	Total	1	2	3	4	5	6	7	8	9	10	11	12	13	14	15	16	17	18	19	20	21	22	23	24	25
1	Australia	63	2	5	8	11	13	16	19	21	24	26	29	32	35	36	38	40	43	46	49	51	53	56	57	60	63
1	(1) Sam Masters	13	2								3				3							2		3
1	(2) Alex Davies	9		3								2				1		2							1
1	(3) Nick Morris	14			3			3									2		3							3
1	(4) Darcy Ward	15				3			3				3							3							3
1	(5) Dakota North	12					2			2				3							3		2
2	Denmark	45	3	5	6	7	10	10	11	14	15	18	20	22	24	26	27	30	31	33	35	38	41	41	44	44	45
2	(1) Mikkel B. Jensen	14	3					X					2					3					3		3
2	(2) Mikkel Michelsen	6		2					1					2					1					X
2	(3) Marc Randrup	5			1					-					2					2					-
2	(4) Nicklas Porsing	6				1					1					2					2					E
2	(5) Michael Jepsen Jensen	14					3			3		3					1					3					1
Placing	Team / Rider name	Total	1	2	3	4	5	6	7	8	9	10	11	12	13	14	15	16	17	18	19	20	21	22	23	24	25
3	Great Britain	28	0	0	2	4	5	7	9	10	12	13	13	14	14	14	17	18	20	21	21	22	23	24	26	26	28
3	(1) Richie Worrall	8	X						2								3				T			1	2
3	(2) Joe Haines	2		E						1			-									1				X
3	(3) Kyle Howarth	8			2						2		X	1				1									2
3	(4) Steve Worrall	6				2						1			X				2				1
3	(5) Tom Perry	4					1	2								0				1				-
4	Czech Republic	13	1	2	2	2	2	3	3	3	3	3	4	4	5	8	8	8	8	8	9	9	9	11	11	13	13
4	(1) Václav Milík Jr.	4	1							0						3			0						0		-
4	(2) Eduard Krčmář	1		1							0						0			X			T
4	(3) Jan Holub III	4			0							X	1								1			2
4	(4) Ondrej Veverka	1				X		1						0								0			-		F
4	(5) Zdenek Holub	3					0		0						1			0								2
Placing	Team / Rider name	Total	1	2	3	4	5	6	7	8	9	10	11	12	13	14	15	16	17	18	19	20	21	22	23	24	25

M - exclusion for exceeding two minute time allowance • T - exclusion for touching the tapes • X - other exclusion • E - retired or mechanical failure • F - fell

Helmet colours were permanent for each team (red, blue, white and yellow/black). Colours in tables show gate positions:
gate A – inside	gate B	gate C	gate D – outside

=== Semifinal 2 ===
- 28 May 2012
- GER Abensberg

Placing	Team / Rider name	Total	1	2	3	4	5	6	7	8	9	10	11	12	13	14	15	16	17	18	19	20	21	22	23	24	25
1	Sweden	55	3	6	9	12	15	17	20	22	25	27	30	33	35	38	40	42	43	43	46	47	49	50	50	52	55
1	(1) Dennis Andersson	11	3						3								2				3				F
1	(2) Anders Mellgren	11		3						2			3									1				2
1	(3) Mathias Thoernblom	14			3						3			3				2									3
1	(4) Anton Rosén	10				3						2			2				1				2
1	(5) Pontus Aspgren	9					3	2								3				0				1
2	Russia	51	1	2	4	5	7	10	10	13	13	16	17	18	20	21	24	27	30	33	34	37	40	43	46	49	51
2	(1) Andrey Kudryashov	12	1					3					1					3			1		3
2	(2) Sergey Karachincev	5		1					E					1					-					3
2	(3) Vladimir Borodulin	13			2					3					2					3					3
2	(4) Viktor Kulakov	5				1					0					1					-					3
2	(5) Vitaly Belousov	16					2					3					3		3			3					2
Placing	Team / Rider name	Total	1	2	3	4	5	6	7	8	9	10	11	12	13	14	15	16	17	18	19	20	21	22	23	24	25
3	Germany	23	0	2	2	4	5	5	6	7	9	10	10	12	12	14	14	15	16	18	20	20	21	21	23	23	23
3	(1) Kai Huckenbeck	6	0							1						2			1		2						E
3	(2) Marcel Helfer	8		2							2						0	1		2			1
3	(3) Michel Hoffman	1			F							1	0								-			0
3	(4) Andre Mochner	6				2		0						2								0			2
3	(5) Valentin Grobauer	2					1		1						0			-								0
4	Finland	21	2	2	3	3	3	4	6	6	7	7	9	9	12	12	13	13	13	14	14	16	16	18	19	20	21
4	(1) Timo Lahti	10	2								1				3			0				2		2
4	(2)	0
4	(3) Niko Siltaniemi	4			1			1				0					1		0							1
4	(4) Mika Loppi	6				0			2				2			0				1							1
4	(5) Jiri Nieminen	1					0			0				0							0		0		1
Placing	Team / Rider name	Total	1	2	3	4	5	6	7	8	9	10	11	12	13	14	15	16	17	18	19	20	21	22	23	24	25

M - exclusion for exceeding two minute time allowance • T - exclusion for touching the tapes • X - other exclusion • E - retired or mechanical failure • F - fell

Helmet colours were permanent for each team (red, blue, white and yellow/black). Colours in tables show gate positions:
gate A – inside	gate B	gate C	gate D – outside

=== World Final ===
- 1 September, 2012
- POL Gniezno, Stadion Start Gniezno S.A.

Placing	Team / Rider name	Total	1	2	3	4	5	6	7	8	9	10	11	12	13	14	15	16	17	18	19	20	21	22	23	24	25
1	Poland	61	2	5	8	11	14	16	19	21	24	27	29	32	35	38	40	43	45	48	48	51	51	53	56	59	61
1	(1) Patryk Dudek	13	2								3				3							3		2
1	(2) Maciej Janowski	15		3								3				3		3							3
1	(3) Tobiasz Musielak	12			3			2									2		2							3
1	(4) Przemysław Pawlicki	13				3			3				2							3							2
1	(5) Bartosz Zmarzlik	8					3			2				3							F		-
2	Australia	44	3	5	6	6	7	10	10	13	14	15	16	16	18	20	23	25	28	30	32	32	35	38	40	41	44
2	(1) Darcy Ward	14	3							3						2			3								3
2	(2) Nick Morris	11		2							1						3			2			3
2	(3) Dakota North	8			1							1	1								2			3
2	(4) Alex Davies	5				0		3						X								0			2
2	(5) Sam Masters	6					1		0						2			2								1
Placing	Team / Rider name	Total	1	2	3	4	5	6	7	8	9	10	11	12	13	14	15	16	17	18	19	20	21	22	23	24	25
3	Sweden	26	1	2	2	3	5	5	6	6	8	10	13	13	13	14	15	15	16	16	19	21	22	23	23	25	26
3	(1) Jacob Thorssell	5	1					X					3					X					1		0
3	(2) Oliver Berntzon	2		1					1					X					-					-
3	(3) Mathias Thoernblom	0			0					0					0					0					-
3	(4) Pontus Aspgren	10				1					2					1					3			1		2
3	(5) Anton Rosén	9					2					2					1		1			2					1
4	Russia	17	0	0	2	4	4	5	7	8	8	8	8	10	11	11	11	12	12	13	13	14	16	16	17	17	17
4	(1) Andrey Kudryashov	3	E						2	1							0				X				-
4	(2) Sergey Karachintsev	1		E						-			0									1				X
4	(3) Vladimir Borodulin	6			2						0			2				1							1		0
4	(4) Ilya Chalov	5				2						0			1				0				2
4	(5) Vitaly Belousov	2					0	1								0				1				0
Placing	Team / Rider name	Total	1	2	3	4	5	6	7	8	9	10	11	12	13	14	15	16	17	18	19	20	21	22	23	24	25

M - exclusion for exceeding two minute time allowance • T - exclusion for touching the tapes • X - other exclusion • E - retired or mechanical failure • F - fell

Helmet colours were permanent for each team (red, blue, white and yellow/black). Colours in tables show gate positions:
gate A – inside	gate B	gate C	gate D – outside

== See also ==
- 2012 Speedway World Cup
- 2012 Individual Speedway Junior World Championship
