= 2015 Team Speedway Junior World Championship =

Motorcycle racing competition

Seasons
- ← 2014 2016 →

The 2015 Team Speedway Junior World Championship was the 11th FIM Team Under-21 World Championship season. The final took place on 31 October, 2015 at the Olympic Park Speedway in Mildura, Australia, the first time it was held outside of Europe.

Poland won their 8th Team Under-21 World Championship. The Poles dominated the Final, winning 15 of the 20 heats.

== Results ==
In the 2015 Final the host team was Australia. The other three finalists were determined in two Semi-Finals held on 22 August. First and second places from Semi-final 1 held in Güstrow, Germany would go through to the final. The winner of Semi-final 2 held on the same day in Opole, Poland would earn the last place in the Final.

Denmark won the first Semi-final from the host nation Germany, Great Britain and Finland. Defending Under-21 World Champions Poland were easy winners of the second Semi-final from the Czech Republic, Russia and Sweden.

== Heat details ==
=== Final ===
- 31 October 2015
- AUS Mildura, Olympic Park Speedway
- Referee: (Denmark) Jesper Steentoft

Poland	Manager: Rafał Dobrucki	50
No	Rider Name	Pts.	Heats
1	Maksym Drabik	13	3,3,3,1,3
2	Piotr Pawlicki Jr.	15	3,3,3,3,3
3	Bartosz Zmarzlik	15	3,3,3,3,3
4	Paweł Przedpełski	7	f,3,2,1,1

Denmark	Manager: Anders Secher	39
No	Rider Name	Pts.	Heats
1	Nikolaj Busk Jakobsen	15	3,2,2,3,2+3
2	Anders Thomsen	4	2,2,fx,-,-
3	Mikkel Bech	14	2,1,2,3,4^+2
4	Mikkel Michelsen	6	2,2,1,1,X

Australia	Manager: Mark Lemon	29
No	Rider Name	Pts.	Heats
1	Nick Morris	12	e,2,6^,2,2
2	Max Fricke	6	1,1,1,1,2
3	Jack Holder	4	fx,0,1,2,1
4	Brady Kurtz	7	1,1,2,2,1

Germany	Manager: Herbert Rudolph	5
No	Rider Name	Pts.	Heats
1	Valentin Grobauer	0	0,0,0,0,0
2	Mark Riss	2	2,0,0,0,f
3	Michael Härtel	1	fx,0,fx,0,1
4	Erik Riss	2	1,1,0,0^,0

^ donates Joker

== See also ==
- 2015 Speedway World Cup
- 2015 Individual Speedway Junior World Championship
