= Australia national under-21 speedway team =

Australia
- Association: Motorcycling Australia
- FIM code: MA
- Team manager: Mark Lemon
- Team captain: Brady Kurtz
- SWC wins: 0
- Squad: Brady Kurtz (c); Max Fricke; Jake Allen; Jack Holder; Cameron Heeps

World Championships
Team U-21	0	3	2
- Best result: 2nd (2012, 2016, 2017)
Individual U-21	6	4	4
- Best result: 1st - last one in 2016 (Max Fricke)

The Australia national under-21 speedway team is the national under-21 motorcycle speedway team of Australia and is controlled by the Motorcycling Australia. Like the senior Australian team, the Under-21s are managed by former rider Mark Lemon.

The team has qualified to the Under-21 World Cup Final on four occasions, though they only raced in the final three of those times. These came in 2008 when they finished fourth, 2011 when they won their semi-final but were forced to withdraw due to travel cost and visa problems, 2012 when the team finished in second place, and again in 2013 when they finished fourth.

The Australian team was guaranteed a place in the 2015 World Championship Final due to it being held at the Olympic Park Speedway in Mildura on 31 October. It was the first time that the Under-21 Team Championship Final was held outside of Europe or the UK and was held just one week after the 2015 Speedway Grand Prix of Australia was run in the Victorian state capital Melbourne. The Aussie's finished third on the night behind winners Poland and runner-up Denmark.

Australia has produced four Under-21 World Champions: Leigh Adams (1992), Jason Crump (1995), Darcy Ward (2009 and 2010) and Max Fricke (2016). In 1983, Steve Baker won the European Under-21 Championship open for riders from all continents. The European Championship was renamed as the World Championship in 1988.

Crump would go on to win the Speedway World Championship in 2004, 2006 and 2009. Adams has won a record 10 Australian Championships and jointly holds the record for Australian Under-21 Championships with four wins with 2012 World Champion Chris Holder, while Ward is also a triple Australian Under-21 Champion. Baker won the South Australian Championship in 1985 and second in the Australian Championship in 1987.

The current Australian Under-21 team (at the 2016 World Championship Final) was reigning Australian champion Brady Kurtz (c), triple Australian Under-21 champion Max Fricke, Jack Holder, Jake Allen and reserve Cameron Heeps. The team finished in second place on 37 points in Norrköping, Sweden behind winners Poland who scored 44 points. Denmark and host nation Sweden finished in 3rd and 4th places respectively.

== Competition ==
Team Speedway Junior World Championship
Year	Place	Pts.	Riders
2005	—	—	Withdrew from Qualifying Round Two and was replaced by Denmark B
2006			Did not enter
2007	—	—	3rd place in Qualifying Round One; Chris Holder, Troy Batchelor, Trevor Harding, Cory Gathercole, Robert Ksiezak
2008	4	33	Chris Holder (16), Troy Batchelor (7), Tyron Proctor (7), Robert Ksiezak (2), Kozza Smith (1); In Qualifying Round started also: Aaron Summers
2009	—	—	3rd place in Qualifying Round One; Darcy Ward, Richard Sweetman, Justin Sedgmen, Mitchell Davey, Josh Grajczonek
2010	—	—	2nd place in Qualifying Round One; Darcy Ward, Richard Sweetman, Sam Masters, Justin Sedgmen, Josh Grajczonek
2011*	—	—	Won Semi-final Two; Darcy Ward, Richard Sweetman, Sam Masters, Justin Sedgmen, Josh Grajczonek
2012	2	44	Darcy Ward (14), Nick Morris (11), Dakota North (8), Sam Masters (6), Alex Davies (5)
2013	4	20	Darcy Ward (14), Alex Davies (4), Nick Morris (3), Tyson Nelson (2); In Semi-final One started also: Todd Kurtz
2014	—	—	2nd place in Semi-final One; Max Fricke (10), Mason Campton (10), Nick Morris (9+2), Ryan Douglas (8)
2015	3	29	Host nation Nick Morris (12), Brady Kurtz (7), Max Fricke (6), Jack Holder (4)
2016	2	37	Jake Allen (13), Jack Holder (9), Max Fricke (8), Brady Kurtz (7), Cameron Heeps (Res - DNR)

* Due to cost of travel and visa problems, Australia withdrew from the 2011 Final,

== Honours ==
=== Individual Under-21 World Championship ===
- 1983* - (Italy) Lonigo, Pista Speedway - Steve Baker 13pts
- 1992 - (Germany) Pfaffenhofen an der Ilm, Speedway Stadion Pfaffenhofen - Leigh Adams 14+3pts
- 1995 - (Finland) Tampere, Ratinan Stadion - Jason Crump 13+3pts
- 2009 - (Croatia) Goričan, Stadium Milenium - Darcy Ward 13pts
- 2010 - (Poland) Gdańsk, (Latvia) Daugavpils, (Czech Republic) Pardubice - Darcy Ward 30+3pts
- 2016 - (United Kingdom) King's Lynn, (Czech Republic) Pardubice, (Poland) Gdańsk - Max Fricke 46pts

* Steve Baker's win in 1983 was when it was known as the European Under-21 Championship

== See also ==
- Australia national speedway team
- Australian Under-21 Championship
