= 2010 Team Speedway Junior World Championship =

Motorcycle racing competition

Seasons
- ← 2009 2011 →

The 2010 Team Speedway Junior World Championship was the sixth FIM Team Under-21 World Championship season. The final took place on 5 September, 2010 at Rye House Stadium in Rye House, England. It was the first final in Great Britain. The Championship was won by Denmark, who beat Sweden, the defending champions Poland and host team Great Britain. It was first championship not to be won by Poland.

== Results ==
In the 2010 Final will be the host team Great Britain. Another finalist will be determined in two Qualifying Rounds on May 29 and June 19.

- Qualifying Round One
- (Czech Republic) Plzeň
- 29 May 2010

Pos.	National team	Pts.
	Poland	65
	Australia	46
	Czech Republic	26
	Finland	13

- Qualifying Round Two
- (Germany) Güstrow
- 10 July 2010

Pos.	National team	Pts.
	Denmark	53
	Sweden	48
	Germany	28
	Slovenia	20

- The Final
- (United Kingdom) Rye House
- 5 September 2010

Pos.	National team	Pts.
1	Denmark	51
2	Sweden	37
3	Poland	35
4	Great Britain	25

== Heat details ==
=== Semifinal 1 ===
- 29 May 2010
- CZE Plzeň, Plzeň Region
- Speedway Track Plzeň – Bory (Length: 365 m)
- Referee: (Denmark) Jesper Stentoft
- Jury President: (Slovenia) Boris Kotnjek
- References

Placing	Team / Rider name	Total	1	2	3	4	5	6	7	8	9	10	11	12	13	14	15	16	17	18	19	20	21	22	23	24	25
1	Poland	65	3	6	9	12	15	18	21	24	26	29	30	33	35	38	41	41	44	47	49	50	53	56	59	62	65
1	(1) Maciej Janowski	15	3							3						3			3								3
1	(2) Patryk Dudek	14		3							2						3			3			3
1	(3) Dawid Lampart	12			3							3	1								2			3
1	(4) Artur Mroczka (c)	13				3		3						3								1			3
1	(5) Przemysław Pawlicki	11					3		3						2			Fx								3
2	Australia	46	0	2	4	6	8	9	10	12	15	15	18	20	23	25	26	29	31	31	34	37	39	41	42	44	46
2	(1) Justin Sedgmen	8	0					1					-					3					2				2
2	(2) Sam Masters	9		2					1					2					2					2
2	(3) Richard Sweetman	11			2					2					3					R		3			1
2	(4) Darcey Ward (c)	15				2					3		3			2					3					2
2	(5) Josh Grajczonek	3					2					Fx					1					-					-
Placing	Team / Rider name	Total	1	2	3	4	5	6	7	8	9	10	11	12	13	14	15	16	17	18	19	20	21	22	23	24	25
3	Czech Republic	26	1	2	3	3	4	6	8	9	10	12	12	13	13	13	13	15	16	18	19	21	22	22	24	25	26
3	(1) Jan Holub III	6	1								1				X					2		2		0
3	(2) Roman Čejka	8		1								2				0		2							2		1
3	(3) Michael Hádek	5			1			2									0		1							1
3	(4) Matěj Kůs (c)	2				X			2				F							-							-
3	(5) Václav Milík, Jr.	5					1			1				1							1		1
4	Finland	13	2	2	2	3	3	3	3	3	3	4	6	6	7	8	10	11	11	12	12	12	12	13	13	13	13
4	(1) Timo Lahti	6	2						0				2				2				0				0
4	(2) No rider	0		N						-			-									-				-
4	(3) Jari Makinen (c)	1			0						0			0				1				Fx					0
4	(4) Niko Siltaniemi	3				1				0		1			1				0				0
4	(5) Kalle Katajisto	3					0	0								1				1				1		F
Placing	Team / Rider name	Total	1	2	3	4	5	6	7	8	9	10	11	12	13	14	15	16	17	18	19	20	21	22	23	24	25

M - exclusion for exceeding two minute time allowance • T - exclusion for touching the tapes • X - other exclusion • E - retired or mechanical failure • F - fell

Helmet colours were permanent for each team (red, blue, white and yellow/black). Colours in tables show gate positions:
gate A – inside	gate B	gate C	gate D – outside

=== Semifinal 2 ===
- 10 July 2010
- (Germany) Güstrow, Mecklenburg-Vorpommern
- Speedwaystadion Güstrow (Length: 298 m)
- Referee: (Sweden) Krister Gardell
- Jury President: (France) Christian Bouin
- References

Placing	Team / Rider name	Total	1	2	3	4	5	6	7	8	9	10	11	12	13	14	15	16	17	18	19	20	21	22	23	24	25
1	Denmark	53	3	4	7	8	11	12	15	18	20	22	22	25	25	27	30	32	32	35	38	41	41	44	47	50	53
1	(1) Patrick Hougaard (c)	15	3						3								3				3				3
1	(2) Peter Kildemand	10		1						3			R									3				3
1	(3) Michael Jepsen Jensen	13			3						2			3				2									3
1	(4) Lasse Bjerre	3				1						2			X				M				N
1	(5) René Bach	12					3	1								2				3				3
2	Sweden	48	2	5	7	9	11	14	15	17	20	23	26	28	28	31	32	35	38	38	40	41	43	43	45	47	48
2	(1) Dennis Andersson	13	2					3					3					3					2
2	(2) Kim Nilsson	9		3					1					2					3					0
2	(3) Linus Sundström	6			2					2					X					R					2
2	(4) Simon Gustafsson (c)	12				2					3					3					2					2
2	(5) Ludvig Lindgren	8					2					3					1					1					1
Placing	Team / Rider name	Total	1	2	3	4	5	6	7	8	9	10	11	12	13	14	15	16	17	18	19	20	21	22	23	24	25
3	Germany	28	0	0	0	3	4	4	6	6	7	8	10	11	14	14	14	15	16	18	19	21	24	26	26	26	28
3	(1) Frank Facher	8	0								1				3							2		2
3	(2) Erik Pudel	2		0								1				X		1							X
3	(3) Max Dilger	1			X			0									0		1							0
3	(4) Kevin Wölbert (c)	11				3			2				2							2							2
3	(5) Kai Huckenbeck	6					1			0				1							1		3
4	Slovenia	20	1	3	4	4	4	6	6	7	7	7	8	8	10	11	13	13	15	16	16	16	17	18	19	20	20
4	(1) Aleksander Čonda	6	1							1						1			2					1			0
4	(2) Matija Duh	8		2				2			X						2			1			1
4	(3) Samo Kukovica	2			1							0	1								0			-
4	(4) Nejc Malesic	1				0		-						0								0			1
4	(5) Aljosa Remih (c)	3					0		0						2			0								1
Placing	Team / Rider name	Total	1	2	3	4	5	6	7	8	9	10	11	12	13	14	15	16	17	18	19	20	21	22	23	24	25

M - exclusion for exceeding two minute time allowance • T - exclusion for touching the tapes • X - other exclusion • E - retired or mechanical failure • F - fell

Helmet colours were permanent for each team (red, blue, white and yellow/black). Colours in tables show gate positions:
gate A – inside	gate B	gate C	gate D – outside

=== World Final ===
- 5 September 2010
- GBR Rye House, East of England
- Rye House Speedway (Length: 262 m)
- Referee: (Poland) Marek Wojaczek
- Jury President: (Sweden) Christer Bergstrom
- References

Placing	Team / Rider name	Total	1	2	3	4	5	6	7	8	9	10	11	12	13	14	15	16	17	18	19	20	21	22	23	24	25
1	Denmark	51	2	5	8	9	11	11	13	16	18	19	22	25	25	28	30	31	32	34	37	40	42	43	46	49	51
1	(1) Michael Jepsen Jensen	12	2						2								2				3				3
1	(2) René Bach	15		3						3			3									3				3
1	(3) Patrick Hougaard (c)	11			3						2			3				1									2
1	(4) Lasse Bjerre	5				1						1			0				1				2
1	(5) Peter Kildemand	8					2	Fx								3				2				1
2	Sweden	37	1	3	5	5	5	8	9	11	12	15	16	18	20	22	25	27	30	31	32	33	33	36	36	36	37
2	(1) Simon Gustafsson (c)	7	1					3					1					2					0
2	(2) Dennis Andersson	11		2					1					2					3					3
2	(3) Ludvig Lindgren	7			2					2					2					1					R3
2	(4) Kim Nilsson	4				0					1					2					1					0
2	(5) Linus Sundström	8					T					3					3					1					1
Placing	Team / Rider name	Total	1	2	3	4	5	6	7	8	9	10	11	12	13	14	15	16	17	18	19	20	21	22	23	24	25
3	Poland	35	3	4	4	7	7	9	12	13	13	13	13	14	17	17	18	18	20	23	23	25	26	28	30	32	35
3	(1) Maciej Janowski	10	3								T				3			Fx				2		2
3	(2) Patryk Dudek	1		1								Fx				Fx		-							-
3	(3) Artur Mroczka (c)	8			T			2									1		2				1			2
3	(4) Przemysław Pawlicki	14				3			3				0							3					2		3
3	(5) Szymon Woźniak	2					F3			1				1							0		-
4	Great Britain	25	0	0	0	2	5	6	6	6	9	11	13	13	14	15	15	18	18	18	20	20	23	23	24	25	25
4	(1) Kyle Newman	0	T							Fx						-			0								0
4	(2) Kyle Hughes	0		0							-						R			0			-
4	(3) Josh Auty	7			Fx							2	2			1					2			0
4	(4) Joe Haines	7				2		1						0								0	3		1
4	(5) Lewis Bridger	11					3		0		3				1			3								1
Placing	Team / Rider name	Total	1	2	3	4	5	6	7	8	9	10	11	12	13	14	15	16	17	18	19	20	21	22	23	24	25

M - exclusion for exceeding two minute time allowance • T - exclusion for touching the tapes • X - other exclusion • E - retired or mechanical failure • F - fell

Helmet colours were permanent for each team (red, blue, white and yellow/black). Colours in tables show gate positions:
gate A – inside	gate B	gate C	gate D – outside

== See also ==
- 2010 Speedway World Cup
- 2010 Individual Speedway Junior World Championship
