= Great Britain national under-21 speedway team =

Great Britain
- Association: Auto-Cycle Union
- FIM code: ACU
- Team manager: Dave Croucher
- Team captain: Tai Woffinden
- Nation colour: Red and White

World Championships
Team U-21	—	1	—
- Best result: 2nd (2007)
Individual U-21	5	7	7
- Best result: 1st - last in 1999 (Lee Richardson)

The Great Britain national under-21 speedway team is the national under-21 motorcycle speedway team of Great Britain and is controlled by the Auto-Cycle Union. The team was started in all editions of Under-21 World Cup and was won one silver medal in 2007. Denmark has produced three Under-21 World Champions: Chris Louis (1990), Joe Screen (1993) and Lee Richardson (1999). Two riders, Marvyn Cox (1984) and Gary Havelock (1987) was won Individual U-21 European Championship open for riders from all continents.

== Competition ==
Team Speedway Junior World Championship
Year	Place	Pts.	Riders
2005	—	—	3rd place in Qualifying Round One; Daniel King (9), Richard Hall (6), Edward Kennett (4), Chris Schramm (4), Tommy Allen (1)
2006	—	—	3rd place in Qualifying Round One; James Wright (9), Daniel King (8), Ben Wilson (5), Ben Barker (4), Jason King (2)
2007	2	36	Edward Kennett (14), Lewis Bridger (11), James Wright (6), Daniel King (5), Tai Woffinden (—); In Qualifying Round Two also rode: Ben Barker
2008	—	—	3rd place in Qualifying Round One; Tai Woffinden (11), Lewis Bridger (9), William Lawson (7), Ben Barker (6), Simon Lambert (3)
2009	—	—	4th place in Qualifying Round One; Tai Woffinden (15), Lewis Bridger (6), Simon Lambert (3), Brendan Johnson (2)

== See also ==
- Great Britain national speedway team
