= Czech Republic national under-21 speedway team =

Czech Republic
- Association: Autoklub of the Czech Republic; Autoklub České republiky
- FIM code: ACCR
- Team manager: Milan Spinka
- Nation colour: Red, White and Blue

World Championships
Team U-21	—	—	1
- Best result: 3rd (2007)
Individual U-21	2	4	1
- Best result: 1st - Antonín Kasper, Jr. (1982) and Lukáš Dryml (2002)

The Czech Republic national under-21 speedway team is the national under-21 motorcycle speedway team of the Czech Republic and is controlled by the Autoklub of the Czech Republic. The team started in Under-21 World Cup in all editions, but only one was a medal - bronze in 2007. The Individual competition was won by Antonín Kasper, Jr. (1982) and Lukáš Dryml (2002).

== Competition ==
Team Speedway Junior World Championship
Year	Place	Pts.	Riders
2005	4	20	Tomáš Suchánek (12), Zdeněk Simota (5), Luboš Tomíček, Jr. (2), Filip Šitera (1), Martin Málek (0)
2006	—	—	2nd place in Qualifying Round Two; Zdeněk Simota (14), Filip Šitera (9), Hynek Štichauer (7), Matěj Kůs (3)
2007	3	30	Filip Šitera (11), Matěj Kůs (9), Luboš Tomíček, Jr. 6), Hynek Stichauer (4), Martin Gavenda (0)
2008	—	—	2nd place in Qualifying Round One; Filip Šitera (12), Hynek Štichauer (9), Matěj Kůs (9), Michael Hádek (5), Adam Vandirek (3)
2009	4	15	Matěj Kůs (7), Filip Šitera (3), Václav Milík, Jr. (2), Martin Gavenda (2), Jan Holub III (1)
2010	—	—	3rd place in Qualifying Round One; Roman Čejka, Michael Hádek, Václav Milík, Jr., Matěj Kůs, Jan Holub III

== See also ==
- Czech Republic national speedway team
