= Sweden national under-21 speedway team =

Sweden
- Association: Svenska Motorcykel- och Snöskoterförbundet
- FIM code: SVEMO
- Team manager: Daniel Nelson
- Nation colour: Red and White

World Championships
Team U-21	—	2	2
- Best result: 2nd (2005 and 2006)
Individual U-21	4	6	3
- Best result: 1st - last one in 2000 (Andreas Jonsson)

The Sweden national under-21 speedway team is the national under-21 motorcycle speedway team of Sweden and is controlled by the SVEMO. The team started in Under-21 World Cup in all editions and won four medals: two silver (2005 and 2006) and two bronze (2008 and 2009). Denmark has produced three Under-21 World Champions: Peter Nahlin (1988), Mikael Karlsson (1994) and Andreas Jonsson (2000). In 1985 Per Jonsson has won Individual U-21 European Championship open for riders from all continents.

== Competition ==
Team Speedway Junior World Championship
Year	Place	Pts.	Riders
2005	2	35	Antonio Lindbäck (11), Fredrik Lindgren (9), Eric Andersson (8), Jonas Davidsson (7); In Qualifying Round started also: Sebastian Aldén
2006	2	27	Fredrik Lindgren (15), Thomas H. Jonasson (8), Sebastian Aldén (4), Robert Pettersson (0), Ricky Kling (0); In Qualifying Round started also: Antonio Lindbäck
2007	—	—	3rd place in Qualifying Round Two; Billy Forsberg, Simon Gustafsson, Robin Törnqvist, Ricky Kling, Thomas H. Jonasson
2008	3	38	Kim Nilsson (9), Simon Gustafsson (8), Ricky Kling (8), Billy Forsberg (8), Ludvig Lindgren (5); In Qualifying Round started also: Thomas H. Jonasson
2009	3	32	Thomas H. Jonasson (11), Simon Gustafsson (6), Kim Nilsson (6), Linus Eklöf (5), Ludvig Lindgren (4); In Qualifying Round started also: Jonas Messing

== See also ==
- Sweden national speedway team
- Sweden national under-19 speedway team
