= 2008 Team Speedway Junior World Championship =

Motorcycle racing competition

Seasons
- ← 2007 2009 →

The 2008 Team Speedway Junior World Championship was the fourth FIM World Team Junior Championship. The final took place on 21 September 2008, in Holsted, Denmark. The championship was won by the Polish junior team who were the defending champions from 2007. Denmark finished in second place and Sweden were third.

== Calendar ==
Date	Venue	Winner	
Semi-finals
7 June	(Czech Republic) Pardubice	Sweden	result
22 June	(Germany) Diedenbergen	Poland	result
Final
21 September	(Denmark) Holsted	Poland	result

== Qualification ==
=== Semifinal 1 ===
- June 7, 2008
- (Czech Republic) Pardubice
- Referee: (Denmark) Jesper Steentoft
- Jury President: (Russia) Boris Kotnjek

Placing	Team / Rider name	Total	1	2	3	4	5	6	7	8	9	10	11	12	13	14	15	16	17	18	19	20	21	22	23	24	25
1	Sweden	41	0	1	4	4	4	4	5	7	10	11	13	16	17	18	20	22	25	27	29	32	35	35	36	38	41
1	(1) Ricky Kling (c)	6	0						1								2				2				1
1	(2) Billy Forsberg	10		1						2			2									3				2
1	(3) Thomas H. Jonasson	14			3						3			3				2									3
1	(4) Ludvig Lindgren	8				0						1			1				3				3
1	(5) Simon Gustafsson	3					0	0								1				2				0
2	Czech Republic	38	3	3	5	8	10	12	15	18	18	18	19	21	24	26	26	27	29	30	31	31	33	34	36	36	38
2	(1) Filip Šitera (c)	12	3							3						2			2								2
2	(2) Adam Vandirek	3		0							0						0			1			2
2	(3) Michael Hádek	5			2							0	1								1			1
2	(4) Hynek Štichauer	9				3		2						2								0			2
2	(5) Matěj Kůs	9					2		3						3			1								E
Placing	Team / Rider name	Total	1	2	3	4	5	6	7	8	9	10	11	12	13	14	15	16	17	18	19	20	21	22	23	24	25
3	(United Kingdom) Great Britain	36	1	3	3	5	8	9	11	11	12	15	18	18	18	18	21	21	22	25	28	29	30	32	32	35	36
3	(1) Ben Barker	6	1					1					3					0					1
3	(2) William Lawson	7		2					2					0					1					2
3	(3) Simon Lambert	3			0					0					0					3					0
3	(4) Lewis Bridger	9				2					1					0					3					3
3	(5) Tai Woffinden (c)	11					3					3					3					1					1
4	Russia	35	2	5	6	7	8	11	11	12	14	16	16	17	19	22	23	26	26	26	26	28	28	31	34	35	35
4	(1) Emil Saifutdinov (c)	11	2								2				2							2		3
4	(2) Artem Laguta	14		3								2				3		3							3
4	(3) Artem Vodyakov	6			1			3									1		E							1
4	(4) Igor Kononov	1				1			0				0							0							E
4	(5) Alexander Kosolapkin	3					1			1				1							0		0
Placing	Team / Rider name	Total	1	2	3	4	5	6	7	8	9	10	11	12	13	14	15	16	17	18	19	20	21	22	23	24	25

M - exclusion for exceeding two minute time allowance • T - exclusion for touching the tapes • X - other exclusion • E - retired or mechanical failure • F - fell

Helmet colours were permanent for each team (red, blue, white and yellow/black). Colours in tables show gate positions:
gate A – inside	gate B	gate C	gate D – outside

=== Semifinal 2 ===
- June 22, 2008
- (Germany) Diedenbergen
- Referee: (Australia) Craig Ackroyd
- Jury President: (Hungary) Janos Nadasdi

Placing	Team / Rider name	Total	1	2	3	4	5	6	7	8	9	10	11	12	13	14	15	16	17	18	19	20	21	22	23	24	25
1	Poland	63	3	5	8	11	13	14	17	17	19	22	25	28	30	33	36	38	41	44	47	50	52	55	57	60	63
1	(1) Mateusz Szczepaniak	11	3					1					3					2					2
1	(2) Robert Kasprzak	14		2					3					3					3					3
1	(3) Grzegorz Zengota	10			3					X/F					2					3					2
1	(4) Adrian Gomólski (c)	14				3					2					3					3					3
1	(5) Maciej Janowski	14					2					3					3					3					3
2	Australia	47	2	5	6	8	9	12	14	16	19	21	22	23	26	28	30	33	35	36	36	37	40	40	43	45	47
2	(1) Robert Ksiezak	9	2								3				3							1		E
2	(2) Chris Holder (c)	13		3								2				2		3					3		-
2	(3) Kozza Smith	13			1			3									2		2						3	2
2	(4) Tyron Proctor	8				2			2				1							1							2
2	(5) Aaron Summers	4					1			2				1							E		-
Placing	Team / Rider name	Total	1	2	3	4	5	6	7	8	9	10	11	12	13	14	15	16	17	18	19	20	21	22	23	24	25
3	Germany	36	1	2	4	5	8	10	11	14	14	15	17	19	20	21	22	23	24	26	28	30	31	33	34	35	36
3	(1) Kevin Wölbert (c)	8	1							3						1			1				1				1
3	(2) Erik Pudel	2		1							0						1			-			-
3	(3) Richard Speiser	10			2							1	2								2			2		1
3	(4) Frank Facher	10				1		2						2						2		2			1
3	(5) Max Dilger	6					3		1						1			1								-
4	Slovenia	4	0	0	0	0	0	0	0	1	2	2	2	2	2	2	2	2	2	2	3	3	3	4	4	4	4
4	(1) Aleksander Čonda	1	0						0								0				1				0
4	(2) Matija Duh (c)	1		0						1			0									0				0
4	(3) Aljosa Remih	1			0						1			0				0									0
4	(4) Matic Voldrih	0				0						0			0				0				0
4	(5) Dalibor Bot	1					0	0								0				0				1
Placing	Team / Rider name	Total	1	2	3	4	5	6	7	8	9	10	11	12	13	14	15	16	17	18	19	20	21	22	23	24	25

M - exclusion for exceeding two minute time allowance • T - exclusion for touching the tapes • X - other exclusion • E - retired or mechanical failure • F - fell

Helmet colours were permanent for each team (red, blue, white and yellow/black). Colours in tables show gate positions:
gate A – inside	gate B	gate C	gate D – outside

== Final ==
- September 21, 2008
- (Denmark) Holsted
- Referee: (United Kingdom) Mick Bates
- Jury President: (Sweden) Christer Bergström

Placing	Team / Rider name	Total	1	2	3	4	5	6	7	8	9	10	11	12	13	14	15	16	17	18	19	20	21	22	23	24	25
1	Poland	40	0	0	0	3	5	8	10	11	12	14	17	19	19	21	24	25	27	29	32	33	36	36	38	38	40
1	(1) Michał Mitko	7	0							1						2			2								2
1	(2) Artur Mroczka	9		F							1						3			2			3
1	(3) Grzegorz Zengota (c)	8			0							2	3								3			0
1	(4) Maciej Janowski	11				3		3						2								1			2
1	(5) Daniel Pytel	5					2		2						0			1								0
2	Denmark	39	3	6	7	8	9	11	14	16	16	19	21	21	23	24	26	26	26	26	27	30	30	33	36	39	39
2	(1) Nicolai Klindt	12	3						3								2				1				3
2	(2) Patrick Hougaard (c)	16		3						2			2									3		3		3
2	(3) Peter Kildemand	1			1						Fx			N				N									0
2	(4) René Bach	6				1						3			2				X				0
2	(5) Morten Risager	4					1	2								1				0				-
Placing	Team / Rider name	Total	1	2	3	4	5	6	7	8	9	10	11	12	13	14	15	16	17	18	19	20	21	22	23	24	25
3	Sweden	38	1	3	5	7	10	11	12	12	15	16	17	18	19	19	20	22	25	26	28	30	32	34	34	35	38
3	(1) Kim Nilsson	9	1								3				1							2		2
3	(2) Ludvig Lindgren	5		2								1				0		2							0
3	(3) Simon Gustafsson	8			2			1									1		3							1
3	(4) Ricky Kling (c)	8				2			1				1							1							3
3	(5) Billy Forsberg	8					3			F				1							2		2
4	Australia	33	2	3	6	6	6	6	6	9	11	11	11	14	17	20	20	23	24	27	27	27	28	29	30	32	33
4	(1) Troy Batchelor	7	2					0					0					3					1	1
4	(2) Robert Ksiezak	2		1					0					-					1					-
4	(3) Chris Holder (c)	16			3					3				3	3					3					1
4	(4) Tyron Proctor	7				0					2					3					0					2
4	(5) Kozza Smith	1					0					0					0					0					1
Placing	Team / Rider name	Total	1	2	3	4	5	6	7	8	9	10	11	12	13	14	15	16	17	18	19	20	21	22	23	24	25

M - exclusion for exceeding two minute time allowance • T - exclusion for touching the tapes • X - other exclusion • E - retired or mechanical failure • F - fell

Helmet colours were permanent for each team (red, blue, white and yellow/black). Colours in tables show gate positions:
gate A – inside	gate B	gate C	gate D – outside

== See also ==
- 2008 Speedway World Cup
