= Denmark national under-21 speedway team =

Denmark
- Association: Danish Motor Union; Danmarks Motor Union
- FIM code: DMU
- Team manager: Jan Stæchmann
- Team captain: Patrick Hougaard
- Nation colour: Red and White

World Championships
Team U-21	2	11	5
- Best result: Champion (2010),(2013)
Individual U-21	6	2	6
- Best result: 1st - last one in 1997 (Jesper B. Jensen)

The Denmark national under-21 speedway team is the national under-21 motorcycle speedway team of Denmark and is controlled by the Danish Motor Union. The team started in Under-21 World Cup in all editions and won five medals: one gold (2010), two silver (2008 and 2009) and two bronze (2005 and 2006). Denmark has produced three Under-21 World Champions: Gert Handberg (1989), Brian Andersen (1991) and Jesper B. Jensen (1997). In 1977 and 1978 two Danish riders, Alf Busk and Finn Rune Jensen, was won Individual U-21 European Championship. Tommy Knudsen was won 1980 Individual U-21 European Championship open for riders from all continents.

== Competition ==
Team Speedway Junior World Championship
Year	Place	Pts.	Riders
2005	3	24	Morten Risager (10), Henrik Møller (7), Nicolai Klindt (5), Patrick Hougaard (2), Kristian Lund (0); In Qualifying Round started: Kenneth Bjerre
2006	3	26	Nicolai Klindt (12), Henrik Møller (7), Morten Risager (4), Kenneth Hansen (2), Klaus Jakobsen (1); In Qualifying Round started: Leon Madsen and Patrick Hougaard
2007	—	—	2nd place in Qualifying Round One; Morten Risager (9), Nicolai Klindt (8), Kenneth Hansen (8), Patrick Hougaard (6), Klaus Jakobsen (—)
2008	2	39	Patrick Hougaard (16), Nicolai Klindt (12), René Bach (6), Morten Risager (4), Peter Kildemand (1)
2009	2	45	Patrick Hougaard (14), Nicolai Klindt (13), Leon Madsen (11), René Bach (7), Kenni A. Larsen (0)
2010	1	51	René Bach (15), Michael Jepsen Jensen (12), Patrick Hougaard (11), Peter Kildemand (8), Lasse Bjerre (5)

=== Team B ===
Team Speedway Junior World Championship
Year	Place	Pts.	Riders
2005	—	—	Replaced of Australia. 2nd place in Qualifying Round One; Claus Vissing (10+3), Jan Graversen (7), Klaus Jacobsen (6), Jesper Kristiansen (3), Steven Andersen (2)

== See also ==
- Denmark national speedway team
- Denmark national under-19 speedway team
