= 2026 Speedway of Nations 2 =

Speedway competition

- Venue: Plochodrážní stadion Markéta
- Location: Prague, Czech Republic
- Start date: 22 May 2026
- End date: 22 May 2026

The 2026 Speedway of Nations 2 (SON2) was the 22nd Team Under-21 World Championship season, organised by the FIM. The event took place on 22 May 2026 at the Plochodrážní stadion Markéta in Prague, Czech Republic.

Germany were the defending champions having won the 2025 Speedway of Nations 2.

== Summary ==
Poland won the title, with riders Wiktor Przyjemski and Bartosz Bańbor scoring 45 points, after beating Denmark in the final heat to win the race. Denmark finished second, scoring 37 points, with defending champions Germany narrowly taking the final spot on the podium.

== Final ==
- Plochodrážní stadion Markéta, Prague, Czech Republic
- 22 May

Pos	Nation	Riders	Pts
1	Poland	Wiktor Przyjemski 24, Bartosz Bańbor 21, Kevin Malkiewicz DNR	45
2	Denmark	Villads Nagel 23, Bastian Pedersen 14, Mikkel Andersen 0	37
3	Germany	Mario Häusl 17, Janek Konzack 13, Hannah Grunwald 3	33
4	Great Britain	William Cairns 18, Luke Harrison 12, Cooper Rushen 3	33
5	Australia	Mitchell McDiarmid 19, Beau Bailey 14, Tate Zischke 0	33
6	Czech Republic	Adam Bubba Bednář 23, Adam Nejezchleba 4, Bruno Belan DNR	27
7	Sweden	Rasmus Karlsson 16, Erik Persson 5, Sammy Van Dyck 2	23
8	Ukraine	Nazar Parnitskyi 21, Roman Kapustin 0, Danko Hladkovskyi 0	21

== See also ==
- 2026 SGP2
- 2026 Speedway World Cup
