= Russia national under-21 speedway team =

National under-21 speedway team of Russia

Russia
- Association: Motorcycle Federation of Russia
- FIM code: MFR

World Championships
Team U-21	1	0	0
Individual U-21	2	—	—
- Best result: 1st - Emil Sayfutdinov (2007, 2008)

The Russia national under-21 speedway team is the national under-21 motorcycle speedway team of Russia and is controlled by the Motorcycle Federation of Russia. The team was never qualified to the Under-21 Speedway World Cup finals. Emil Sayfutdinov is first, and so far, only riders who won the Individual U-21 World Championship twice (2007 and 2008).

Due to the 2022 Russian invasion of Ukraine, on March 6, 2022, the Fédération Internationale de Motocyclisme banned all Russian and Belarusian motorcycle riders, teams, officials, and competitions.

== Competition ==
Team Speedway Junior World Championship
Year	Place	Pts.	Riders
2005	—	—	3rd place in Qualifying Round Three; Maxim Karaychentsev (7), Daniil Ivanov (7), Aleksey Kharchenko (6), Roman Ivanov (5)
2006	—	—	3rd place in Qualifying Round Two; Aleksey Guzaev (8), Aleksey Kharchenko (7), Daniil Ivanov (5), Marat Gatiyatov (4), Ruslan Gatiyatov (3)
2007	—	—	4th place in Qualifying Round One; Emil Sayfutdinov (12), Kirill Filinov (9), Alexander Kosolapkin (3), Roman Kantiukov (1), Aleksey Guzaev (1)
2008	—	—	4th place in Qualifying Round One; Artem Laguta (14), Emil Sayfutdinov (11), Artem Vodyakov (6), Alexander Kosolapkin (3), Igor Kononov (1)
2009	—	—	Withdrew from Qualifying Round Two and was replaced by a joint team of Croatian and Slovenian riders, known as "Adria".

== See also ==
- Russia national speedway team
- Russia national under-19 speedway team
