= Poland national under-21 speedway team =

Motorcycle racing team

Poland
- Nickname(s): Biało-czerwoni ("The white and reds"); Białe Orły ("The White Eagles")
- Association: Polish Motor Union; Polski Związek Motorowy
- FIM code: PZM
- Team manager: Marek Cieślak
- Team captain: Grzegorz Zengota
- Nation colour: White and Red

World Championships
Team U-21	5	—	—
- Best result: 1st - last one in 2009
Individual U-21	7	5	4
- Best result: 1st - last one in 2006 (Karol Ząbik)

The Poland national under-21 speedway team is the national under-21 motorcycle speedway team of Poland and is controlled by the Polish Motor Union (PZM). The Under-21 Speedway World Cup has been dominated by Poland with them winning first place in all of the past championships. Karol Ząbik was a member of Poland team by three finals (2005-2007). Poland has produced seven Under-21 Individual World Champions: Piotr Protasiewicz (1996), Robert Dados (1998), Dawid Kujawa (2001), Jarosław Hampel (2003), Robert Miśkowiak (2004), Krzysztof Kasprzak (2005) and Karol Ząbik (2006).

== Competition ==
Team Speedway Junior World Championship
Year	Place	Pts.	Riders
2005	1	41	Janusz Kołodziej (14), Krzysztof Kasprzak (13), Marcin Rempała (8), Krystian Klecha (3), Karol Ząbik (3); In Qualifying Round Three also rode: Paweł Hlib
2006	1	41	Karol Ząbik (13), Paweł Hlib (12), Adrian Miedziński (8), Krzysztof Buczkowski (5), Paweł Miesiąc (3)
2007	1	40	Krzysztof Buczkowski (11), Karol Ząbik (10), Paweł Hlib (10), Mateusz Szczepaniak (6), Adrian Gomólski (—); In Qualifying Round One also rode: Maciej Piaszczyński, Marcin Jędrzejewski
2008	1	40	Maciej Janowski (11), Artur Mroczka (9), Grzegorz Zengota (8), Michał Mitko (7), Daniel Pytel (5); In Qualifying Round Two also rode: Robert Kasprzak, Adrian Gomólski, Mateusz Szczepaniak
2009	1	57	Przemysław Pawlicki (15), Maciej Janowski (13), Grzegorz Zengota (13), Artur Mroczka (11), Dawid Lampart (5)

=== Team B ===
Team Speedway Junior World Championship
Year	Place	Pts.	Riders
2005	—	—	Replaced of France. 2nd place in Qualifying Round Three; Kamil Brzozowski (11), Adrian Gomólski (8), Patryk Pawlaszczyk (7), Sebastian Brucheiser (6), Marcin Jędrzejewski (4)

== See also ==
- Speedway in Poland
- Poland national speedway team
- Poland national under-19 speedway team
