= Team Speedway Under-21 World Championship =

World Championship Under-21 motorcycle speedway competition

- Current season, competition or edition: 2026 Speedway of Nations 2
- Sport: Motorcycle speedway
- Founded: 2005
- Continent: World
- Most recent champion: Poland (2026)
- Most titles: Poland (18 times)
- Related competitions: Individual Championship

The Team Speedway Under-21 World Championship is a speedway competition to determine the World Championship for national Under-21 teams (the sport's equivalent of the Under-21 World Cup in football).

As of 2022, the event has been known as the Speedway of Nations 2, the Under-21 division of the Speedway of Nations. The first edition of the competition was in 2005 prior to its incorporation with the Speedway of Nations.

Poland has dominated the competition winning the title record 17 times.

== Previous winners ==
Year	Venue	Winners	Runner-up	3rd place
2005	(Czech Republic) Svítkov Stadium; Pardubice	Poland; Janusz Kołodziej; Krystian Klecha; Marcin Rempała; Krzysztof Kasprzak; Karol Ząbik	Sweden; Antonio Lindbäck; Eric Andersson; Fredrik Lindgren; Jonas Davidsson	Denmark; Morten Risager; Patrick Hougaard; Kristian Lund; Henrik Møller; Nicolai Klindt
2006	(Poland) Municipal Stadium; Rybnik	Poland; Krzysztof Buczkowski; Adrian Miedziński; Paweł Hlib; Karol Ząbik; Paweł Miesiąc	Sweden; Robert Pettersson; Fredrik Lindgren; Sebastian Aldén; Ricky Kling; Thomas H. Jonasson	Denmark; Klaus Jakobsen; Morten Risager; Nicolai Klindt; Henrik Møller; Kenneth Hansen
2007	(Germany) Altes Stadion; Abensberg	Poland; Karol Ząbik; Paweł Hlib; Krzysztof Buczkowski; Mateusz Szczepaniak; Adrian Gomólski	Great Britain; Edward Kennett; Danny King; Lewis Bridger; James Wright; Tai Woffinden	Czech Republic; Luboš Tomíček, Jr. Filip Šitera; Matěj Kůs; Hynek Štichauer; Martin Gavenda
2008	(Denmark) Speedway Center; Holsted	Poland; Michał Mitko; Artur Mroczka; Grzegorz Zengota; Maciej Janowski; Daniel Pytel	Denmark; Nicolai Klindt; Patrick Hougaard; Peter Kildemand; René Bach; Morten Risager	Sweden; Kim Nilsson; Ludvig Lindgren; Simon Gustafsson; Ricky Kling; Billy Forsberg
2009	(Poland) Edward Jancarz Stadium; Gorzów	Poland; Dawid Lampart; Maciej Janowski; Grzegorz Zengota; Przemysław Pawlicki; Artur Mroczka	Denmark; René Bach; Kenni Larsen; Leon Madsen; Nicolai Klindt; Patrick Hougaard	Sweden; Linus Eklöf; Thomas H. Jonasson; Simon Gustafsson; Kim Nilsson; Ludvig Lindgren
2010	(England) Rye House Stadium; Rye House	Denmark; Michael Jepsen Jensen; René Bach; Patrick Hougaard; Lasse Bjerre; Peter Kildemand	Sweden; Simon Gustafsson; Dennis Andersson; Ludvig Lindgren; Kim Nilsson; Linus Sundström	Poland; Maciej Janowski; Patryk Dudek; Artur Mroczka; Przemysław Pawlicki; Szymon Woźniak
2011	(Russia) Trud Stadium; Balakovo	Russia; Andrey Kudryashov; Artem Laguta; Vitaly Belousov; Ilya Chalov; Vladimir Borodulin	Denmark; René Bach; Mikkel Bech; Jonas Andersen; Michael Jepsen Jensen; Mikkel Michelsen	Ukraine; Kiril Tsukanov; Andriy Kobrin; Aleksandr Loktaev; Volodymyr Teygel; Stanislav Melnichuk
2012	(Poland) Stadion Startu Gniezno; Gniezno	Poland; Patryk Dudek; Maciej Janowski; Tobiasz Musielak; Przemysław Pawlicki; Bartosz Zmarzlik	Australia; Darcy Ward; Nick Morris; Dakota North; Alex Davies; Sam Masters	Sweden; Jacob Thorssell; Oliver Berntzon; Mathias Thoernblom; Pontus Aspgren; Anton Rosén
2013	(Czech Republic) Svítkov Stadium; Pardubice	Denmark; Michael Jepsen Jensen; Mikkel Michelsen; Mikkel Bech; Nicklas Porsing	Poland; Patryk Dudek; Paweł Przedpełski; Piotr Pawlicki Jr. Bartosz Zmarzlik	Czech Republic; Václav Milík Jr. Zdeněk Holub; Roman Čejka; Eduard Krčmář
2014	(Denmark) Speedway Center; Slangerup	Poland; Paweł Przedpełski; Piotr Pawlicki Jr. Bartosz Zmarzlik; Kacper Gomólski	Denmark; Mikkel Michelsen; Lasse Bjerre; Mikkel Bech	Sweden; Oliver Berntzon; Jacob Thorssell; Victor Palovaara; Fredrik Engman
2015	(Australia) Olympic Park; Mildura	Poland; Maksym Drabik; Piotr Pawlicki Jr. Bartosz Zmarzlik; Paweł Przedpełski	Denmark; Nikolaj Busk Jakobsen; Anders Thomsen; Mikkel Bech; Mikkel Michelsen	Australia; Nick Morris; Max Fricke; Jack Holder; Brady Kurtz
2016	(Sweden) Norrköping Motorstadion; Norrköping	Poland; Krystian Pieszczek; Bartosz Zmarzlik; Paweł Przedpełski; Bartosz Smektała	Australia; Brady Kurtz; Jake Allen; Max Fricke; Jack Holder	Denmark; Frederik Jakobsen; Mikkel B. Andersen; Patrick Hansen; Andreas Lyager
2017	(Poland) Municipal Stadium; Rybnik	Poland; Bartosz Smektała; Kacper Woryna; Maksym Drabik; Dominik Kubera; Rafał Karczmarz	Australia; Jack Holder; Max Fricke; Josh Pickering; Brady Kurtz; Jaimon Lidsey	Denmark; Jonas Jeppesen; Andreas Lyager; Mikkel B. Andersen; Patrick Hansen; Frederik Jakobsen
2018	(Denmark) Speedway Center; Outrup	Poland; Rafał Karczmarz; Daniel Kaczmarek; Maksym Drabik; Bartosz Smektała; Wiktor Lampart	Denmark; Christian Thaysen; Patrick Hansen; Andreas Lyager; Frederik Jakobsen; Jonas Seifert-Salk	Great Britain; Dan Bewley; Ellis Perks; Zach Wajtknecht; Nathan Greaves; Connor Mountain
2019	(England) National Speedway Stadium; Manchester	Poland; Bartosz Smektała; Dominik Kubera; Maksym Drabik; Wiktor Lampart; Michał Gruchalski	Great Britain; Robert Lambert; Dan Bewley; Drew Kemp; Kyle Bickley; Leon Flint	Denmark; Mads Hansen; Frederik Jakobsen; Patrick Hansen; Jonas Jeppesen
2020	(Denmark) Speedway Center; Outrup	Poland; Dominik Kubera; Wiktor Lampart; Jakub Miśkowiak; Viktor Trofimov Jr. Norbert Krakowiak	Denmark; Tim Sørensen; Mads Hansen; Jonas Seifert-Salk; Matias Nielsen; Marcus Birkemose	Great Britain; Dan Bewley; Tom Brennan; Drew Kemp; Jordan Palin; Leon Flint
2021	(Poland) Józef Piłsudski Municipal Stadium; Bydgoszcz	Poland; Wiktor Lampart; Jakub Miśkowiak	Denmark; Mads Hansen; Marcus Birkemose; Tim Sørensen	Great Britain; Tom Brennan; Drew Kemp; Leon Flint
2022	(Denmark) Vojens Speedway Center; Vojens	Poland; Mateusz Cierniak; Jakub Miśkowiak; Wiktor Przyjemski	Czech Republic; Jan Kvěch; Petr Chlupáč	Great Britain; Tom Brennan; Drew Kemp
2023	(Latvia) Riga Speedway Stadium; Riga	Poland; Mateusz Cierniak; Wiktor Przyjemski; Bartłomiej Kowalski	Denmark; Esben Hjerrild; Jesper Knudsen; Emil Breum	Latvia; Francis Gusts; Ričards Ansviesulis; Ernest Matjuszonok
2024	(England) National Speedway Stadium; Manchester	Poland; Bartosz Bańbor; Wiktor Przyjemski	Sweden; Philip Hellström Bängs; Casper Henriksson	Australia; Keynan Rew; James Pearson
2025	(Poland) MotoArena; Toruń	Germany; Norick Blödorn; Mario Häusl; Hannah Grunwald	Denmark; Mikkel Andersen; Villads Nagel; Bastian Pedersen	Australia; Mitchell McDiarmid; Tate Zischke; James Pearson
2026	(Czech Republic) Markéta Stadium; Prague	Poland; Wiktor Przyjemski; Bartosz Bańbor; Kevin Małkiewicz	Denmark; Villads Nagel; Bastian Pedersen; Mikkel Andersen	Germany; Mario Häusl; Janek Konzack; Hannah Grunwald

== Team Classification ==
Pos	National Team	Gold	Silver	Bronze	Total
1.	Poland	18	1	1	20
2.	Denmark	2	11	5	18
3.	Germany	1	0	1	2
4.	Russia	1	0	0	1
5.	Sweden	0	4	4	8
6.	Australia	0	3	3	6
7.	Great Britain	0	2	4	6
8.	Czech Republic	0	1	2	3
9.	Ukraine	0	0	1	1
	Latvia	0	0	1	1

== Rider classification (top 10) ==
Pos	Rider	Team	Total	Gold	Silver	Bronze
1.	Bartosz Zmarzlik	Poland	5	4	1	
2.	Maksym Drabik	Poland	4	4		
	Bartosz Smektała	Poland	4	4		
	Wiktor Przyjemski	Poland	4	4		
5.	Paweł Przedpełski	Poland	4	3	1	
6.	Maciej Janowski	Poland	4	3		1
7.	Karol Ząbik	Poland	3	3		
8.	Piotr Pawlicki Jr.	Poland	3	2	1	
	Michael J. Jensen	Denmark	3	2	1	
10.	Artur Mroczka	Poland	3	2		1
	Przemysław Pawlicki	Poland	3	2		1

== Rules ==
=== Eligibility ===
The minimum age limit (16 years) starts on the date of the rider's birthday and the maximum age limit (21 years) finishes at the end of the year in which they reach 21 years old.

=== Team composition ===
The 4 competing teams shall each consist of 5 riders; there shall be no substitute rider:

- Team A (Helmet colour Red): No 1, 2, 3, 4, 5
- Team B (Blue): No 1, 2, 3, 4, 5
- Team C (White): No 1, 2, 3, 4, 5
- Team D (Yellow/Black): No 1, 2, 3, 4, 5

When a team is 6 or more points in arrears of the leading team, the team manager may substitute a rider in the next or succeeding heats with another rider in his team, However, each rider may be used as a substitute once only. Substitutions must stop when the team is less than 6 points in arrears.

== See also ==
- Motorcycle speedway
- Speedway World Cup
