= Karol Ząbik =

Polish speedway rider

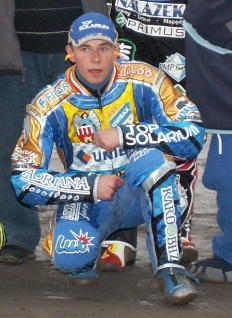
- Born: October 25, 1986 (age 40); Toruń, Poland
- Nationality: Polish

Career history

Poland
- 2003–2008, 2011–2014: Toruń
- 2009: Ostrów

Great Britain
- 2006, 2008–2009: Peterborough
- 2008: Poole

Sweden
- 2007: Rospiggarna

Denmark
- 2004–2007: Brovst

Individual honours
- 2006: World Under-21 Champion
- 2005: European Under-19 Champion
- 2006: Polish Under-21 Champion
- 2006: Silver Helmet Winner

Team honours
- 2005, 2006, 2007: Under-21 World Cup
- 2004, 2005: Polish Under-21 Team Champion

Karol Ząbik (born October 25, 1986, in Toruń, Poland) is a motorcycle speedway rider from Poland. He was the 2006 U21 World champion.

== Career ==
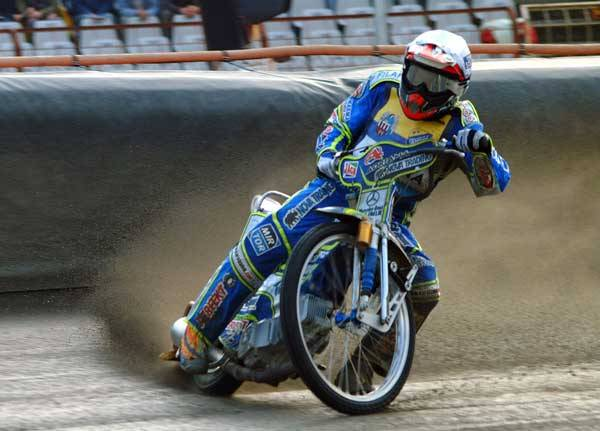
Ząbik riding for Apator Toruń during 2006

In 2006, Ząbik won the Under-21 World Championship, which was held at the Pista Olimpia Terenzano in Italy.

Ząbik has also won European and Polish Under-21 titles and has ridden for the Polish national junior team.

Ząbik raced in the United Kingdom from 2006 to 2008, riding for Peterborough Panthers and Poole Pirates. He was replaced in the Peterborough team by Dane René Bach, at the start of the 2009 season.

== Family ==
Ząbik's father, Jan was also a speedway rider, and is now the team manager of Polish speedway club KS Toruń.

== Results ==
=== Speedway Grand Prix ===
2005 Speedway Grand Prix Final Championship standings (Riding No 18)
Race no.	Grand Prix	Pos.	Pts.	Heats	Draw No
8 /9	(Poland) Polish SGP	18	-	-	18

2006 Speedway Grand Prix Final Championship standings (Riding No 18)
Race no.	Grand Prix	Pos.	Pts.	Heats	Draw No
10 /10	(Poland) Polish SGP	18	-	-	18

permanent speedway rider
wild card, track reserve or qualified reserve
rider not classified (track reserve who did not start)

=== World Under-21 Championship ===
- 2006 – World Champion
- 2007 – 5th place (10 points)

=== Under-21 World Cup ===
- 2005 – World Champion (3 points)
- 2006 – World Champion (13 points)
- 2007 – World Champion (10 points)

=== European Under-19 Championship ===
- 2004 – Silver medal (12+3 points)
- 2005 – European Champion

=== Polish Individual Championship ===
- 2004 – 8th place in Quarter-Final A
- 2006 – 18 place (as 2nd track reserve; 11th in Semi-Final B)

=== Polish Under-21 Championship ===
- 2003 – 14th place (2 points; as track reserve)
- 2004 – 12th in Semi-Final A
- 2005 – Bronze medal (10+3 points)
- 2006 – Polish Champion (14 points)
- 2007 – Silver medal

=== Polish Pairs Speedway Championship ===
- 2005 – 5th place with KS Toruń (5 points)
- 2006 – 3rd in Semi-Final C with KS Toruń

=== Polish Under-21 Pairs Championship ===
- 2003 – 3rd in Semi-Final C
- 2004 – Bronze medal (7 points)
- 2005 – 4th place (8 points)
- 2006 – 6th place (but he rode in Semi-Final A only)

=== Ekstraliga Championship ===
- 2003 – Silver medal with KS Toruń
- 2004 – 4 place with KS Toruń
- 2005 – 4 place with KS Toruń
- 2006 – 7 place with KS Toruń

=== Polish Under-21 Team Championship ===
- 2003 – 2nd in Qualification Group A
- 2004 – Polish Champion (13 points)
- 2005 – Polish Champion (8 points)
- 2006 – 4th in Qualification Group D
- 2007 – Qualification Group A (last round September 15)

=== Golden Helmet ===
- 2007 – 13th place (4 points)

=== Silver Helmet (U-21) ===
- 2004 – 6th place (9 points)
- 2005 – injury (3rd in Semi-Final B, promotion to Final)
- 2006 – Gold medal (15 points)
- 2007 – Semi-Finals will be on September 4

=== Bronze Helmet (U-19) ===
- 2003 – injury (2nd in Semi-Final A, promotion to Final)
- 2004 – 16th place (0 points in 2 heats; two fells)
