= Ricky Kling =

Swedish speedway rider (born 1987)

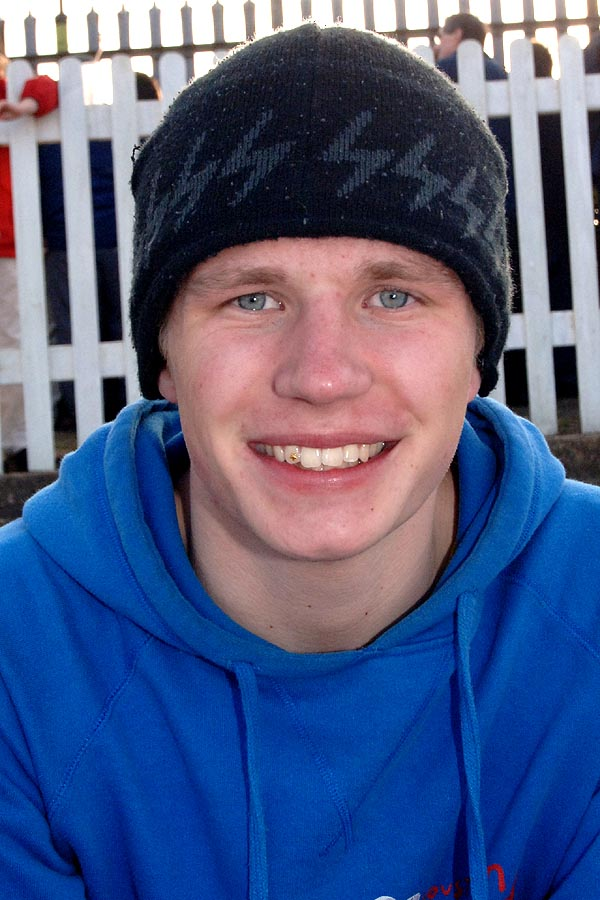
- Born: 2 June 1987 (age 39); Virserum, Sweden
- Nationality: Swedish

Career history

Sweden
- 2007, 2010, 2021: Dackarna
- 2008-2009: Lejonen
- 2014: Vargarna
- 2016: Vetlanda

Great Britain
- 2007: Oxford Cheetahs
- 2007-2008: Lakeside Hammers
- 2009-2010: Eastbourne Eagles
- 2011: Belle Vue Aces
- 2012: Poole Pirates
- 2013: Plymouth Devils

Poland
- 2006: Ostrow
- 2007-2008: Zielona Góra
- 2009: Rybnik
- 2010-2011: Opole

Denmark
- 2008, 2010: Slangerup
- 2014: Region Varde

Individual honours
- 2008: Swedish U21 champion

Ricky Anders Kling (born 2 June 1987 in Virserum, Sweden) is a Swedish former speedway rider. He has won the Swedish Championships as part of Vargarna twice.

== Career ==
Kling had a very promising junior career, and was considered a great promise. He initially struggled to establish himself as a professional rider, but managed to establish himself after a few struggling years.

Kling made his British League debut in 2007 with Oxford, but when they closed mid-season, he then joined Lakeside Hammers. He stayed with the Hammers for the 2008 Elite League speedway season, which was the same year in which he won the Swedish U21 title.

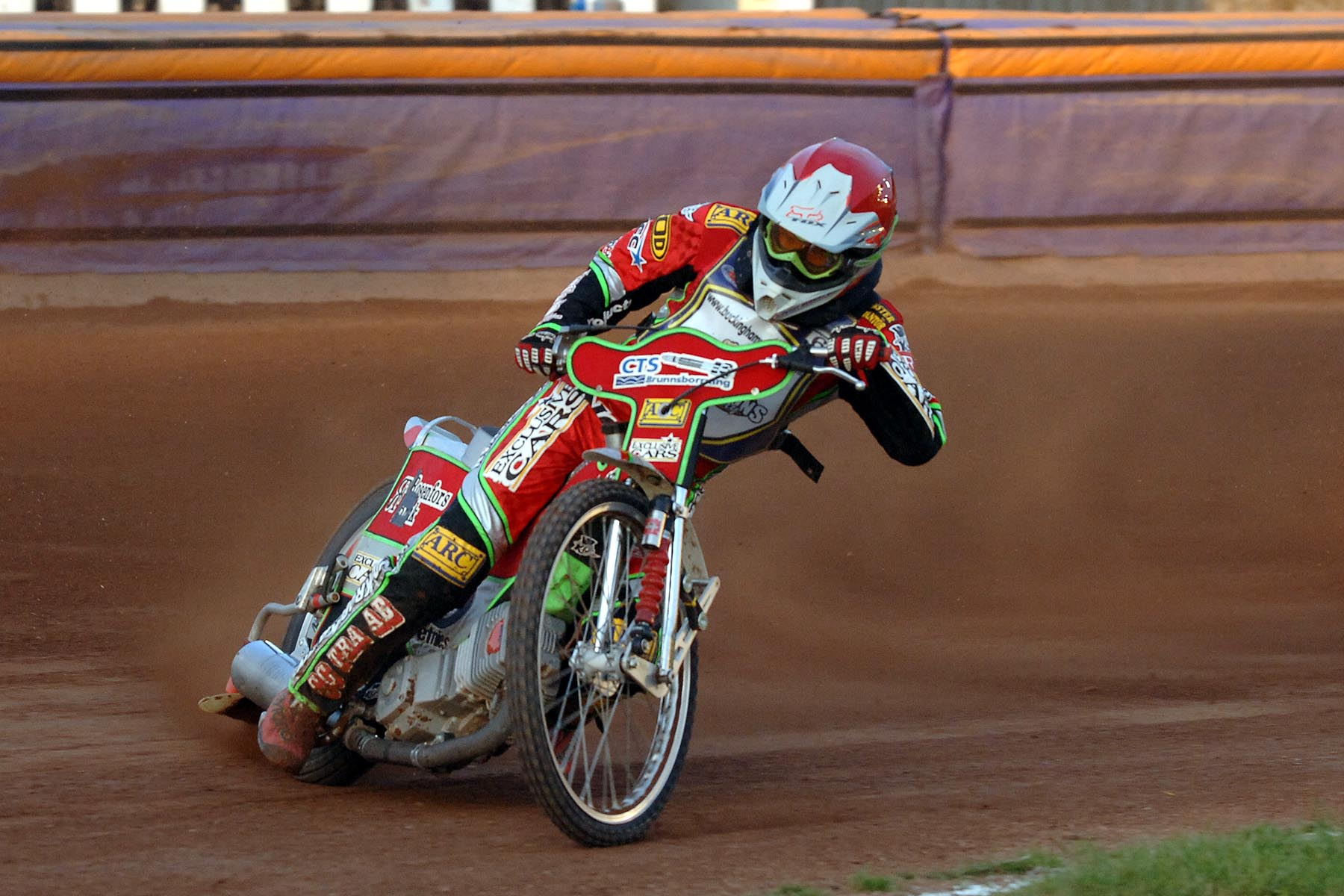
Kling riding for Oxford (Lions) in 2007

Due to building constraints, Kling was forced to look elsewhere for the 2009 Elite League speedway season and joined the Eastbourne Eagles for two seasons.

Kling the joined the Belle Vue Aces for the 2011 season and then Poole Pirates for the 2012 season. His final season in Britain was during the 2013 Premier League speedway season when he rode for the Plymouth Devils.

In 2021, Kling made a one-season comeback riding for Dackarna in the Elitserien.

== Honours ==
- Individual U-21 World Championship:
  - 2006 - 9 place (6 points)
  - 2007 - 14 place (3 points)
- Team U-21 World Championship:
  - 2006 - Silver medal (0 points)
  - 2007 - 6 place (5 points in Semi-Final B)
  - 2008 - Bronze medal (8 points)
- Individual U-19 European Championship:
  - 2005 - 5 place (10+X points)
  - 2006 - 5 place (9 points)
- European Pairs Championship:
  - 2007 - 10 place (11 points in Semi-Final A)
- Team Swedish Championship:
  - 2004 - Bronze medal
  - 2005 - Bronze medal
  - 2006 - Bronze medal

== See also ==
- Sweden national speedway team
