= Filip Šitera =

Czech speedway rider (born 1988)

- Born: 18 April 1988 (age 38); Mladá Boleslav, Czechoslovakia
- Nationality: Czech

Career history

Czech Republic
- 2009–: Mšeno
- 2006–2008: Plzeň

Poland
- 2006–2008: Wrocław
- 2009, 2013: Gniezno
- 2010: Lublin

Great Britain
- 2008–2010: Coventry
- 2010: Belle Vue
- 2011–2012: King's Lynn
- 2012: Glasgow

Sweden
- 2008–: Griparna

Individual honours
- 2006: Czech Under-21 Champion
- 2006: Czech Under-19 Champion
- 2007: Jack Young Solo Cup winner

Team honours
- 2006: Polish Ekstraliga Champion
- 2008: Craven Shield winner
- 2005, 2006: Czech Division One Champion

Filip Šitera (born 18 April 1988) is a Czech former motorcycle speedway rider. He earned 3 international caps for the Czech Republic national speedway team.

== Career ==
Despite showing an interest to ride in the United Kingdom, and attracting the attention of several British clubs, Šitera ruled out riding in the UK from the start of 2008 due to racing and educational commitments but he signed for the Coventry Bees in July. He rides in Poland for Atlas Wrocław and signed a deal to ride in Sweden for Griparna in 2008.

Šitera travelled to Australia in 2007 where he would win the Jack Young Solo Cup at the Gillman Speedway in Adelaide, becoming the first (and so far only) Czech rider to win the cup named in honour of Adelaide's 1951 and 1952 Speedway World Champion.

In 2011 and 2012, Šitera was a rider for King's Lynn Stars.

== Family ==
Šitera's uncles, Jan Verner and Václav Verner are both former Czech international riders. His grandfather and manager Miloslav Verner also rode.

== Results ==
=== World Championships ===
- Team World Championship (Speedway World Cup)
  - 2008 - 7th place (2 pts in Event 2)
- Individual U-21 World Championship
  - 2007 - (Poland) Ostrów Wielkopolski - 9th place (8 pts)
  - 2008 - (Czech Republic) Pardubice - 16th place (2 pts)
  - 2009 - track reserve in Semi-Final 2
- Team U-21 World Championship (Under-21 Speedway World Cup)
  - 2005 - (Czech Republic) Pardubice - 4th place (4 pts)
  - 2006 - 2nd place in Qualifying Round 2
  - 2007 - (Germany) Abensberg - Bronze medal (11 pts)
  - 2008 - 2nd place in Qualifying Round 1
  - 2009 - (Poland) Gorzów Wielkopolski - 4th place (3 pts)

=== European Championships ===
- Individual European Championship
  - 2008 - (Slovenia) Lendava - 14th place (2 pts)
- Individual U-19 European Championship
  - 2004 - (Poland) Rybnik - 12th place (5 pts)
  - 2006 - (Croatia) Goričan - 9th place (8 pts)
  - 2007 - (Poland) Częstochowa - Bronze medal (10+3 pts)
- European Pairs Championship
  - 2008 - started in Semi-Final 2 only
- European Club Champions' Cup:
  - 2007 - 3rd place in Semi-Final 2 (8 pts)

=== Domestic competitions ===
- Individual U-21 Czech Championship
  - 2005 - Silver medal
  - 2006 - Czech Champion
- Individual U-19 Czech Championship
  - 2006 - Czech Champion
- Individual New Zealand Championship
  - 2006 - Bronze medal
- Speedway Series in New Zealand
  - 2006 - 3rd place
- Ivan Mauger Golden Helmet
  - 2006 - Winner

== See also ==
- Czech Republic speedway team
