= Ukraine national under-21 speedway team =

Ukraine
- Association: Federation Motorcycling of Ukraine
- FIM code: FMU
- Nation colour: Blue and Yellow

World Championships
Team U-21	—	—	—
Individual U-21	—	—	—

The Ukraine national under-21 speedway team is the national under-21 motorcycle speedway team of Ukraine and is controlled by the SVEMO. The team started in Under-21 World Cup only once, in 2005 season they losing in Qualifying Round Two. Riders from Ukraine never won a medal: of Individual Under-21 World Championship.

== Competition ==
Team Speedway Junior World Championship
Year	Place	Pts.	Riders
2005	—	—	3rd place in Qualifying Round Two; Andriej Karpow, Iwan Mironow, Siergiej Senko, Lubomir Wojtik, Aleksander Piatniczko
2006–2009			Did not enter

== See also ==
- Ukraine national speedway team
