= Andrey Kudriashov =

Russian speedway rider (1991–2024)

Andrey Kudriashov Андре́й Кудряшо́в
- Born: 10 July 1991; Balakovo, Saratov Oblast, Russian SFSR, USSR
- Died: 18 May 2024 (aged 32)
- Nationality: Russian

Career history

Russia
- 2008–2015, 2021–2023: Balakovo
- 2016–2019: Togliatti

Poland
- 2010, 2012: Kraków
- 2011: Grudziądz
- 2013–2014: Lublin
- 2015–2017: Bydgoszcz
- 2018: Łódź
- 2019: Gniezno
- 2020: Daugavpils
- 2021: Opole

Denmark
- 2015–2016: Holstebro
- 2018: Slangerup

Individual honours
- 2015, 2017, 2018, 2019: Russian champion
- 2009: U-19 Russian Champion

Team honours
- 2011: U21 Team world champion

Andrey Alekseevich Kudriashov (Russian: Андре́й Алексе́евич Кудряшо́в; 10 July 1991 – 18 May 2024) was a Russian motorcycle speedway rider.

== Career ==
Kudriashov came to prominence in 2009, after he won the under-19 Russian Championship, scoring a 15 points maximum. The same year, Kudryashov finished third at the individual Under-21 Russian Championship, scoring 12 points.

On 3 September 2009, Kudryashov started in the motoAllegro Szlaka Piastowska, individual meeting in Poznań, Poland, finishing 15th. This was the prelude to his career in the Team Speedway Polish Championship, when he signed for Wanda Kraków for the 2010 Polish speedway season.

It was also in 2010 that Kudriashov started in the 2011 Speedway Grand Prix Qualification and in qualifying round four scored seven points to qualify for the race-off before being eliminated. He also participated in the 2010 Individual Speedway Junior World Championship in Gdańsk, Poland and qualified for the semi-final, held on 26 June in Landshut, Germany and the 2010 Individual Speedway Junior European Championship finishing seventh in the semi-final in Rawicz, Poland.

In 2011, Kudriashov's career really took off when he won the Team Speedway Under-21 World Championship with teammates Artem Laguta, Vitaly Belousov, Ilya Chalov and Vladimir Borodulin, which was held at his home track at the Trud Stadium in Balakovo.

Kudriashov won the Russian national championship in 2015. He went on to win the national title on three more occasions in 2017, 2018 and 2019.

== Illness and death ==
In early 2023, Kudriashov was forced to retire after being diagnosed with an aggressive skin cancer and sold his speedway equipment in order to support his family. Later in May 2023, he underwent a leg amputation as doctors attempted to stop the spread of the cancer. He died the following year, on 18 May 2024, at the age of 32.

== Results ==
=== World Championships ===
- Individual U-21 World Championship (Under-21 World Championship)
  - 2010 - qualify to the Semi-Final

=== European Championships ===
- Individual Under-19 European Championship
  - 2010 - 7th placed in the Semi-Final One

== See also ==
- Russia national under-21 speedway team (under-19)
