= James Wright (speedway rider) =

British speedway rider

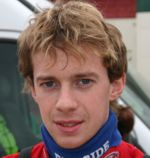
- Born: 13 June 1986 (age 40); Stockport, England
- Nickname: Turbo toucher
- Nationality: British (English)

Career history

Great Britain
- 2002–2004: Buxton Hitmen
- 2003, 2005–2007, 2009–2010: Belle Vue Aces
- 2004–2007, 2011: Workington Comets
- 2008: Swindon Robins
- 2011, 2023: Birmingham Brummies
- 2011–2012: Somerset Rebels
- 2013: Glasgow Tigers
- 2014–2015: Plymouth Devils
- 2020-2021: Newcastle Diamonds
- 2021: Sheffield Tigers
- 2022: Scunthorpe Scorpions

Sweden
- 2007: Västervik

Poland
- 2008: Tarnów

Individual honours
- 2004: Conference League Riders Champion
- 2007: Premier League Riders Champion
- 2009: Scottish Open Champion

Team honours
- 2006: Premier League Fours Winner
- 2004: Conference League KO Cup

James Philip Wright (born 13 June 1986 in Stockport, Greater Manchester), is a speedway rider in the United Kingdom.

== Career history ==
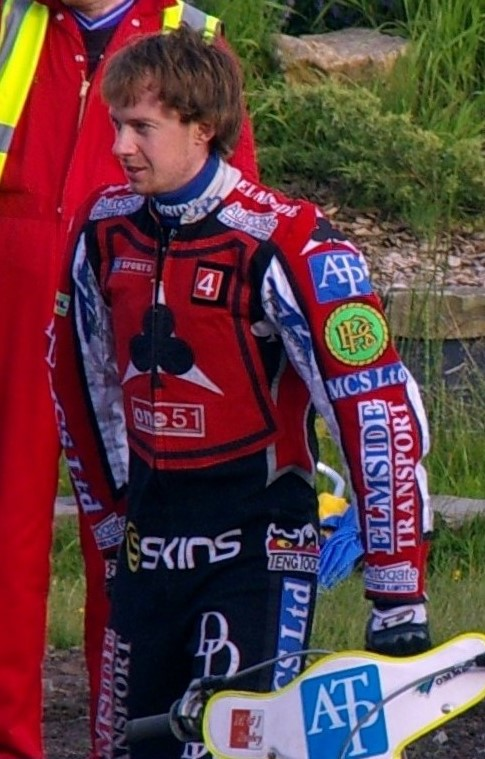

Wright started his career with the Buxton Hitmen before progressing to Belle Vue Aces in 2003. Also in 2004, he became the Conference League Riders' Champion as a Workington Comets rider. The riders' final was held on 28 August at Rye House Stadium.

Wright stayed with Workington and Belle Vue for several years and was part of the Workington four who won the Premier League Four-Team Championship, held on 7 October 2006, at Derwent Park.

In June 2007, Wright signed for Vastervik to ride in the Swedish Elite League and he represented Great Britain for the 2007 Under 21-World Cup Final. Also in 2007, Wright became Premier League Riders' Champion, after winning the Riders' Championship held on 30 September at Abbey Stadium.

In November 2007, Wright announced he had signed a two-year deal to ride for Unia Tarnów in the Polish Liga I, along with his Belle Vue team mates Steve Boxall and Patrick Hougaard. The Swindon Robins announced that Wright would ride for them in 2008 in the Elite League. After Swindon couldn't fit Wright into their 2009 team, he was returned to Belle Vue to continue his career in the Elite League for 2009 and 2010.

Wright was consistently scoring well and averaged 8.14 for Workington in 2011 before joining Somerset Rebels for the remainder of 2011 and the 2012 Premier League speedway season. He spent 2013 at Glasgow and reached his fifth British final during the same year. After the 2014 and 2015 seasons with Plymouth, he left speedway for five years before making a surprise return for the 2021 season. He spent the 2021 season with Newcastle and Sheffield.

In 2022, Wright rode for the Scunthorpe Scorpions in the SGB Championship 2022. In 2023, he signed for Birmingham Brummies for the SGB Championship 2023, eleven years after first appearing for the club back in 2011.

== Family ==
Wright's grandfather, Jim Yacoby rode for the Belle Vue Aces from 1959 until 1967. Wright's brother Charles is also a speedway rider.

== Honours ==
- Team U-21 World Championship:
  - 2007 – GER Abensberg – Silver medal (6 points)
