= Lewis Bridger =

British speedway rider (born 1989)

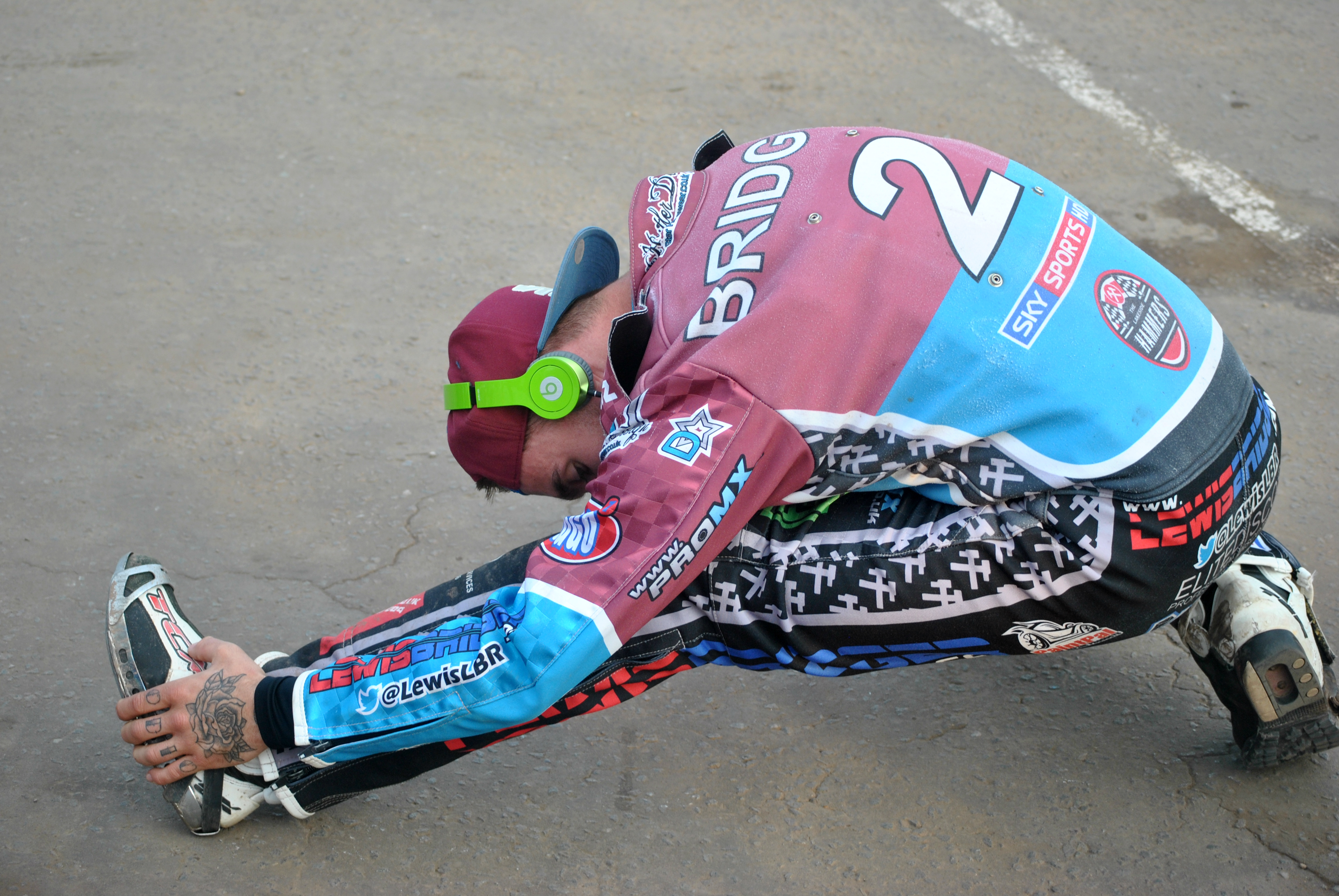
- Born: 4 November 1989 (age 37); Hastings, England
- Nationality: British

Career history
- 2005: Weymouth Wildcats
- 2006-2009, 2011-2012: Eastbourne Eagles
- 2010: Peterborough Panthers
- 2010: Coventry Bees
- 2013-2014, 2016: Lakeside Hammers
- 2015: Leicester Lions
- 2017: Berwick Bandits
- 2021: King's Lynn Stars

Individual honours
- 2006: British Under 18 Champion
- 2009: British Under 21 Champion

Team honours
- 2005: Conference League Fours
- 2008: Elite League KO Cup winner

Lewis Alan Bridger (born 4 November 1989, in Hastings, Sussex) is a former motorcycle speedway rider, who earned five international caps for the Great Britain national speedway team.

== Career ==
Bridger stepped straight into Elite League racing from the Conference League after one season with the Weymouth Wildcats, where he was part of the Weymouth team that won the Conference League Four-Team Championship, held on 25 June 2005 at Loomer Road Stadium.

On 21 September 2007, Bridger was selected to represent Great Britain at the 2007 Under 21-World Cup Final. In 2006, he became British Under 18 Champion and in 2009 he won the British Under 21 Championship.

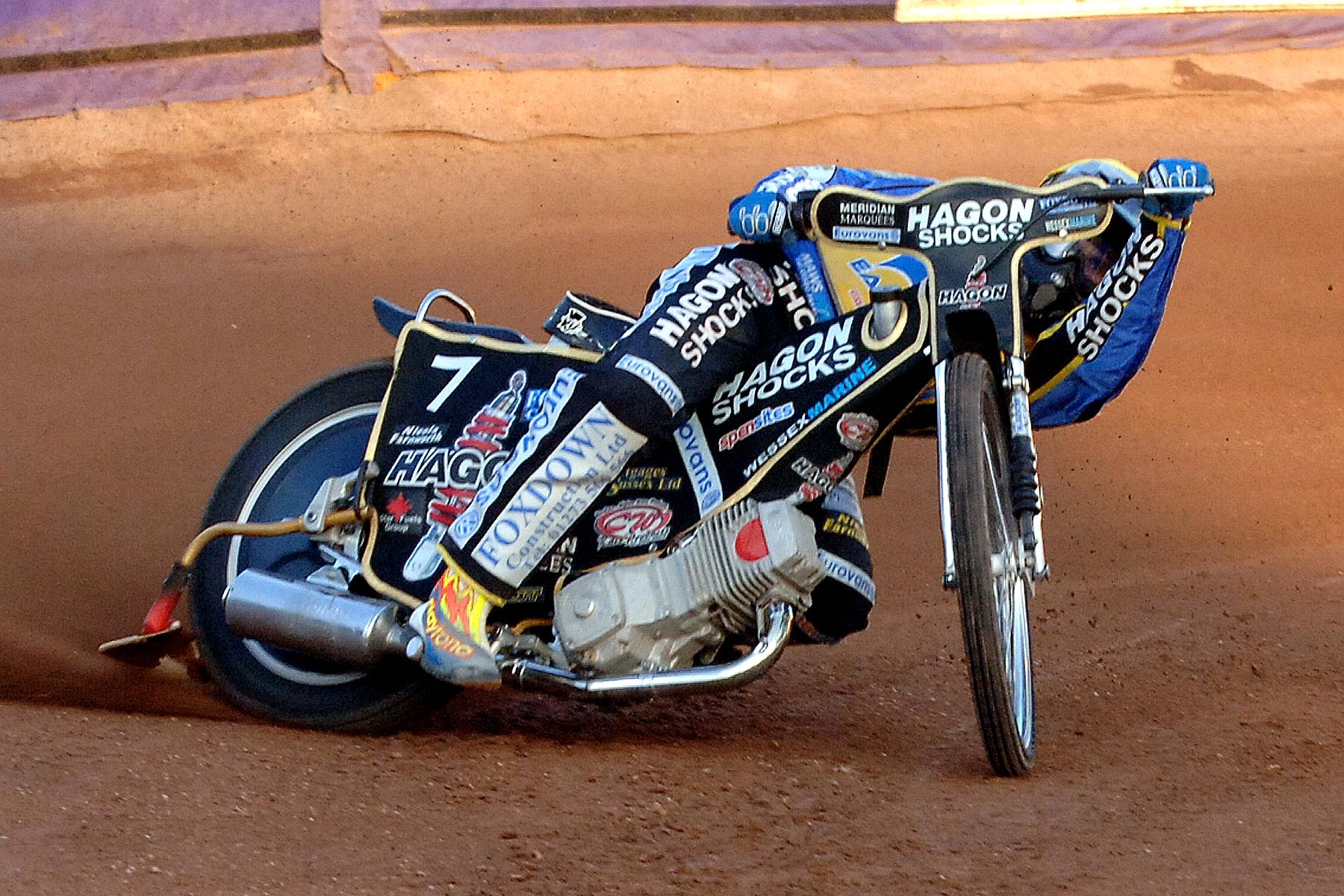
Bridger riding for Eastbourne in 2007

On 20 November 2009, Bridger signed for Peterborough Panthers from his home town club Eastbourne Eagles. He returned to the Eagles for the 2011 and 2012 seasons before moving on to Lakeside Hammers in 2013. After two seasons with the Hammers he announced that would not ride in 2015, stating "I have lost my love for the sport, have no desire to race and am quite simply not enjoying it any more." He changed his mind and signed for Coventry Bees at the start of the 2015 season but left before riding for the club after the management refused to meet his demands to fund equipment. He signed for Leicester Lions in May to replace Mikkel Michelsen who had quit British speedway, but quit again after only one meeting, informing the promotion only a few hours before their home meeting against Poole Pirates on 25 May.

In 2016, Bridger returned to the Lakeside Hammers before completing a season with the Berwick Bandits in 2017. He did not ride in the British leagues from 2018 to 2020.

In 2021, Bridger made a comeback and rode in the top tier of British Speedway, riding for the King's Lynn Stars in the SGB Premiership 2021.

== Career details ==
=== World Championships ===
- U-21 World Individual Championship
  - 2007 – (Poland) Ostrów Wlkp. - 10th place (6 pts)
  - 2008 – (Czech Republic) Pardubice - 10th place (6 pts)
  - 2009 - (Croatia) Goričan - 9th place (7 pts)
- Team U-21 World Championship (U-21 Speedway World Cup)
  - 2007 – (Germany) Abensberg - Silver medal (11 pts)
  - 2008 – 3rd place in Qualifying Round 1 (9 pts)
  - 2009 – 4th place in Qualifying Round 1 (6 pts)
