= René Bach =

Danish speedway rider (born 1990)

- Born: 7 June 1990 (age 36); Hjordkær, Denmark
- Nationality: Danish

Career history

Denmark
- 2007–2009, 2012: Fjelsted
- 2010–2011: Slangerup
- 2013–2018: Esbjerg
- 2019–2025: Holsted

Poland
- 2008, 2014: Łódź
- 2009, 2015: Piła
- 2014: Kraków
- 2016: Rzeszów
- 2018-2019: Bydgoszcz
- 2020: Opole
- 2021, 2024: Daugavpils
- 2023: Tarnów

Great Britain
- 2009–2011: Newcastle
- 2009, 2012: Peterborough
- 2012–2015, 2018: Workington
- 2016: Glasgow

Individual honours
- 2010: Danish U21 Champion

Team honours
- 2010: U-21 World Cup
- 2010: Premier Trophy
- 2010: Premier League Knockout Cup
- 2010: Premier League Playoffs
- 2012: Premier League Pairs

René Bach (born 7 June 1990, in Hjordkær, Rødekro) is a former motorcycle speedway rider from Denmark.

== Career ==
Bach was a member of the Denmark U-21 national team.

Bach started his British leagues career in 2009, joining the Newcastle Diamonds for the 2009 Premier League speedway season. The following season, he recorded a 9.42 average for the Diamonds. After a short spell at Peterborough, he signed for the Workington Comets and in 2012, he won the Premier League Pairs Championship partnering Adam Roynon for Workington during the 2012 Premier League speedway season.

Bach would spend three more seasons with the club from 2013 to 2015. He had a season in Scotland with Glasgow Tigers in 2016 before returning for one final season with Workington in 2018.

Bach announced his retirement in September 2025.

== Results ==
=== World Championships ===
- Individual U-21 World Championship
  - 2009 - 11th place in Qualifying Round 5
- Team U-21 World Championship (Under-21 Speedway World Cup)
  - 2008 - (Denmark) Holsted - Runner-up (6 pts)
  - 2009 - (Poland) Gorzów Wlkp. - Runner-up (7 pts)
  - 2010 - (England) Rye House - Under-21 World Champion (15 pts)

=== European Championships ===
- Individual U-19 European Championship
  - 2008 - track reserve at Semi-Final 2
  - 2009 - (Poland) Tarnów - 15th place (2 pts)
- Team U-19 European Championship
  - 2009 - (Denmark) Holsted - 3rd place (9 pts)

=== Domestic competitions ===
- Team Polish Championship
  - 2008 - 4th place in Second League (Average 0.800 in 5 heats) for Łódź
  - 2009 - Second League for Piła

== See also ==
- Denmark national speedway team
