= Ludvig Lindgren =

Swedish speedway rider

- Born: 23 September 1990 (age 36); Örebro, Sweden
- Nationality: Swedish
- Website: ludviglindgren.eu

Career history

Sweden
- 2011–2012, 2025: Rospiggarna
- 2011, 2016, 2018: Valsarna
- 2013, 2017: Griparna
- 2013–2014: Västervik
- 2014, 2022–2024: Örnarna
- 2015–2016: Masarna
- 2017–2021: Indianerna
- 2019, 2024: Vargarna
- 2022–2023: Dackarna

Poland
- 2008–2009: Zielona Góra
- 2010: Rzeszów

Great Britain
- 2008, 2010–2011, 2013: Wolverhampton
- 2009: Birmingham
- 2012–2018: Newcastle
- 2016: Leicester

Denmark
- 2007: Grindsted

Team honours
- 2008: Team U-19 European Champion
- 2023: Swedish Eliserien champion

Ludvig Lindgren (born 23 September 1990 in Örebro, Sweden) is a motorcycle speedway rider.

== Career ==
Lindgren won the 2008 Team U-19 European Champion title. He was a member of Sweden U-21 and U-19 national teams.

In August 2008, it was announced that Lindgren would join his brother Freddie Lindgren at Wolverhampton in the British Elite League.

In 2011, Lindgren joined Berwick Bandits and in 2012 switched to Newcastle Diamonds, where he later became the club captain.

== Family ==
Lindgren's brother Freddie also rides. His father Tommy Lindgren rode speedway and ice speedway.

== Results ==
=== World Championships ===
- Individual U-21 World Championship
  - 2008 (Czech Republic) Pardubice 9th place (7 points)
  - 2009 (Croatia) Goričan 17th place (1 point)
- Team U-21 World Championship (Under-21 Speedway World Cup)
  - 2008 (Denmark) Holsted 3rd place (5 points)
  - 2009 (Poland) Gorzów Wlkp. 3rd place (4 points)

=== European Championship ===
- Individual U-19 European Championship
  - 2009 7th place in Semi-Final 2
- Team U-19 European Championship
  - 2008 (Poland) Rawicz European Champion (10 points)
  - 2009 (Denmark) Holsted Runner-up (7 points)

=== Polish Championships ===
- Team Polish Championship (League)
  - 2008 3rd place for Zielona Góra

== See also ==
- Sweden national speedway team
