= 2009 Team Speedway Junior World Championship =

Motorcycle racing competition

Seasons
- ← 2008 2010 →

The 2009 Team Speedway Junior World Championship was the fifth annual FIM Team Under-21 World Championship competition since its introduction in 2005. The final took place on 5 September 2009, in Gorzów Wielkopolski, Poland. It was the second final held in Poland, but the first in Gorzów; in 2006, the final took place in Rybnik, where Poland beat Sweden, Denmark and Germany.

== Format ==
The final consisted of the host team and the defending champions Poland. The other finalists were determined in two qualifying rounds (semi-finals). In Abensberg, Germany on 1 June was Sweden (3rd place in 2008 Final), Australia (4th place), Great Britain and host team Germany. Five days later in Pardubice, will be Denmark (Runner-up in 2008 Final), host team Czech Republic and Finland. The Russian team withdrew and was replaced by a joint team of Croatian and Slovenian riders, known as "Adria".

== Results ==
- Qualifying round 1
- (Germany) Abensberg
- 1 June 2009

Pos.	National team	Pts.
1	Sweden	45
2	Germany	40
3	Australia	36
4	Great Britain	26

- Qualifying round 2
- (Czech Republic) Pardubice
- 7 June 2009

Pos.	National team	Pts.
1	Czech Republic	56
2	Denmark	55
3	Croatia / Slovenia	19+3
4	Finland	19+2

- The Final
- (Poland) Gorzów Wlkp.
- 5 September 2009

Pos.	National team	Pts.
1	Poland	57
2	Denmark	45
3	Sweden	32
4	Czech Republic	15

Qualifying Round 1 was won by Sweden (45 points) and they beat host team Germany (40 pts), Australia (35 pts) and Great Britain (26 pts). The top scored rider was Darcy Ward from Australia (maximum 15 points) and British Tai Woffinden (15 points also, but in six heats). Qualifying Round 2 was won by host team Czech Republic (56 pts). To the final was qualify second Denmark (55 pts, more than Germany). Adria (Croatia and Slovenia) beat in run-off Finland (both 16 points).

The Final was won be host team and the defending champions Poland (57 points), who they beat Denmark (45 pts), Sweden (32 pts) and Czech Republic (15 pts). The top scored rider was Przemysław Pawlicki from Poland (maximum 15 points). It was fifth title for Poland team and second for Grzegorz Zengota, Maciej Janowski and Artur Mroczka.

== Heat details ==
=== Semifinal 1 ===
- 1 June 2009 (14:00)
- (Germany) Abensberg, Speedwaystadion Abensberg (Length: 398 m)
- Referee: (United Kingdom) Mick Bates
- Jury President: (Denmark) Jörgen L. Jensen

Placing	Team / Rider name	Total	1	2	3	4	5	6	7	8	9	10	11	12	13	14	15	16	17	18	19	20	21	22	23	24	25
1	Sweden	45	2	5	7	8	11	13	15	17	18	20	23	23	26	27	28	31	31	33	34	37	40	40	43	44	45
1	(1) Thomas H. Jonasson	13	2					2					3					3					3
1	(2) Jonas Messing	5		3					2					X					N					N
1	(3) Linus Eklöf (c)	12			2					2					3					2					3
1	(4) Kim Nilsson	5				1					1					1					1					1
1	(5) Ludvig Lindgren	10					3					2					1					3					1
2	Germany	40	1	1	4	4	4	5	6	6	9	10	12	13	15	17	19	20	21	24	27	29	31	34	36	38	40
2	(1) Kevin Wölbert	12	1						1								2			3	3				2
2	(2) Max Dilger (c)	8		E						E			2			2						2				2
2	(3) Frank Facher	11			3			1			3			1				1									2
2	(4) Erik Pudel	9				0						1			2				1				2	3
2	(5) Sönke Petersen	0					F/N	-								-				-				-
Placing	Team / Rider name	Total	1	2	3	4	5	6	7	8	9	10	11	12	13	14	15	16	17	18	19	20	21	22	23	24	25
3	Australia	35	3	4	4	6	6	6	6	9	11	14	15	17	17	20	20	22	25	25	27	28	29	31	32	32	35
3	(1) Darcy Ward (c)	15	3							3						3			3								3
3	(2) Justin Sedgmen	6		1							2						0			X			1	2
3	(3) Mitchell Davey	4			0							3	1								-			-
3	(4) Richard Sweetman	8				2		0						2							2	1			1
3	(5) Josh Grajczonek	2					X		0						0			2								0
4	Great Britain	26	0	2	3	6	6	9	12	12	12	12	12	15	16	16	19	19	21	22	22	22	22	23	23	26	26
4	(1) Simon Lambert	3	0								0				1					1		0		1
4	(2) Brendan Johnson	2		2								0				0		0							0
4	(3) Tai Woffinden (c)	15			1			3						3			3		2							3
4	(4) Lewis Bridger	6				3			3				X							-							N
4	(5) None (Robert Mear)	0					N			N				-							N		N
Placing	Team / Rider name	Total	1	2	3	4	5	6	7	8	9	10	11	12	13	14	15	16	17	18	19	20	21	22	23	24	25

M - exclusion for exceeding two minute time allowance • T - exclusion for touching the tapes • X - other exclusion • E - retired or mechanical failure • F - fell

Helmet colours were permanent for each team (red, blue, white and yellow/black). Colours in tables show gate positions:
gate A – inside	gate B	gate C	gate D – outside

=== Semifinal 2 ===
- 6 June 2009 (18:00) was canceled and was restarted on 7 June
- (Czech Republic) Pardubice, Speedway track AMK Zlatá přilba Pardubice-Svítkov (Length: 391m)
- Referee: (Germany) Christian Froschauer
- Jury President: (Slovenia) Boris Kotnjek

Placing	Team / Rider name	Total	1	2	3	4	5	6	7	8	9	10	11	12	13	14	15	16	17	18	19	20	21	22	23	24	25	26
1	Czech Republic	56	3	5	8	10	12	15	18	21	23	26	27	29	31	34	36	39	42	44	47	49	49	52	54	54	56
1	(1) Matěj Kůs (c)	14	3							3						3			3								2	style="background-color:" |
1	(2) Jan Holub III	8		2							2						2			2			0
1	(3) Michael Hádek	13			3							3	1								3			3
1	(4) Filip Šitera	11				2		3						2								2			2
1	(5) Michal Dudek	10					2		3						2			3								E
2	Denmark	55	2	2	4	7	10	12	14	15	18	19	22	25	28	28	31	33	35	38	40	43	44	46	49	52	55
2	(1) Leon Madsen	13	2								3				3							3		2
2	(2) Kenni Larsen	6		0								1				E		2							3
2	(3) Nicolai Klindt	12			2			2									3		2							3
2	(4) Patrick Hougaard (c)	14				3			2				3							3							3	style="background-color:" |
2	(5) René Bach	10					3			1				3							2		1
Placing	Team / Rider name	Total	1	2	3	4	5	6	7	8	9	10	11	12	13	14	15	16	17	18	19	20	21	22	23	24	25	26
3	Croatia / Slovenia	19	1	4	4	5	5	6	6	8	8	8	10	10	11	13	13	13	13	14	14	15	17	17	17	19	19
3	(Croatia) (1) Renato Cvetko (c)	1	1						0								0				0	0			-
3	(Slovenia) (2) Matic Voldrih	12		3						2			2			2						1				2		3
3	(Croatia) (3) Dalibor Bot	0			0						0			0				0									-
3	(Croatia) (4) Nikola Pigac	4				1						0			1				0				2		E
3	(Slovenia) (5) Ladislav Vida	2					0	1								-				1				0
4	Finland	19	0	1	2	2	3	3	4	4	5	7	7	8	8	9	10	11	12	12	13	13	16	17	17	18	19
4	(1) Aki-Pekka Mustonen (c)	0	N					-					-					-					-
4	(2) Timo Lahti	6		1					1					1				1	1					1
4	(3) Joni Kitala	1			1			0		E					N					N					N
4	(4) Kalle Katajisto	7				0					1					1					1		3			1
4	(5) Jari Mäkinen	5					1					2	0				1					0					1	2
Placing	Team / Rider name	Total	1	2	3	4	5	6	7	8	9	10	11	12	13	14	15	16	17	18	19	20	21	22	23	24	25	26

M - exclusion for exceeding two minute time allowance • T - exclusion for touching the tapes • X - other exclusion • E - retired or mechanical failure • F - fell

Helmet colours were permanent for each team (red, blue, white and yellow/black). Colours in tables show gate positions:
gate A – inside	gate B	gate C	gate D – outside

=== Final ===
- 5 September 2009 (17:00 UTC+2)
- (Poland) Gorzów Wielkopolski, Edward Jancarz Stadium (Length: 329 m)
- Referee: (United Kingdom) Craig Ackroyd
- Jury President: (Hungary) Janos Nadasdi
- As a team squads was declared was changed three riders:

(Sweden) (4) injury in Danish league match on 28 August Dennis Andersson → Kim Nilsson
(Poland) (1) Patryk Dudek → Dawid Lampart
(Czech Republic) (1) injury in a track practice Michael Hádek → Václav Milík

Placing	Team / Rider name	Total	1	2	3	4	5	6	7	8	9	10	11	12	13	14	15	16	17	18	19	20	21	22	23	24	25
1	Poland	57	0	3	6	9	11	14	15	18	21	24	25	26	29	32	33	36	39	40	43	46	49	51	51	54	57
1	(1) Dawid Lampart	5	F1x						1								1				3				F1x
1	(2) Maciej Janowski	13		3						3			1									3				3
1	(3) Grzegorz Zengota (c)	13			3						3			1				3									3
1	(4) Przemysław Pawlicki	15				3						3			3				3				3
1	(5) Artur Mroczka	11					2	3								3				1				2
2	Denmark	45	2	2	4	6	9	11	11	13	15	17	17	19	21	23	26	28	28	30	32	34	35	38	41	43	45
2	(1) René Bach	7	2					2					0					2					1
2	(2) Kenni Larsen	0		Fx					0					-					F4					-
2	(3) Leon Madsen	11			2					2					2					2					3
2	(4) Nicolai Klindt	13				2					2					2					2			3		2
2	(5) Patrick Hougaard (c)	14					3					2		2			3					2					2
Placing	Team / Rider name	Total	1	2	3	4	5	6	7	8	9	10	11	12	13	14	15	16	17	18	19	20	21	22	23	24	25
3	Sweden	32	3	5	6	6	6	7	9	10	10	11	13	16	17	18	20	21	23	26	27	27	29	30	32	32	32
3	(1) Linus Eklöf	5	3							1						1			-								0
3	(2) Thomas H. Jonasson	11		2							F4						2		2	3			2
3	(3) Simon Gustafsson (c)	6			1							1	2								1			1
3	(4) Kim Nilsson	6				T		1						3								0			2
3	(5) Ludvig Lindgren	4					T		2						1			1								0
4	Czech Republic	15	0	1	1	2	3	3	6	6	7	7	10	10	10	10	10	10	11	11	11	12	12	12	13	14	15
4	(1) Václav Milík, Jr.	2	2x								1				0			0				1		0
4	(2) Martin Gavenda	2		1								0				-		-		0					1
4	(3) Filip Šitera	3			0			R									0		1							1	1
4	(4) Matěj Kůs (c)	7				1			3				3			R2				-							-
4	(5) Jan Holub III	1					1			0				0							0		0
Placing	Team / Rider name	Total	1	2	3	4	5	6	7	8	9	10	11	12	13	14	15	16	17	18	19	20	21	22	23	24	25

M - exclusion for exceeding two minute time allowance • T - exclusion for touching the tapes • X - other exclusion • E - retired or mechanical failure • F - fell

Helmet colours were permanent for each team (red, blue, white and yellow/black). Colours in tables show gate positions:
gate A – inside	gate B	gate C	gate D – outside

== See also ==
- 2009 Speedway World Cup
- 2009 Individual Speedway Junior World Championship
