= 2006 Team Speedway Junior World Championship =

Motorcycle racing competition

Seasons
- ← 2005 2007 →

The 2006 Team Speedway Junior World Championship was the second of the FIM Team Speedway Junior World Championship season. The final took place in Germany, Sweden and Poland in June and September 2006. World Championship was won by Poland team.

== Qualification ==
=== Semifinal 1 ===
Qualifying Round 1

- June 5, 2006
- Motorstadium, (Germany) Abensberg
- Referee: ?
- Latvia was replaced by 2nd German team

Placing	Helmet	Team	Points

1	Denmark	46

Qualify to Final		Draw Color: yellow	
No	Rider Name	Pts.	Heats
13	Morten Risager	14	
14	Henrik Møller	4	
15	Nicolai Klindt	11	
16	Leon Madsen	12	
20	Patrick Hougaard	5	

2	Germany	40

Qualify to Final		Draw Color: blue	
No	Rider Name	Pts.	Heats
5	Christian Hefenbrock	16	
6	Thomas Stange	3	
7	Tobias Kroner	10	
8	Kevin Wölbert	11	
18	Max Dilger	0	

3	Great Britain	28

		Draw Color: white	
No	Rider Name	Pts.	Heats
9	Daniel King	8	
10	Jason King	2	
11	Ben Wilson	5	
12	James Wright	9	
19	Ben Barker	4	

4	Germany II	5

		Draw Color: red	
No	Rider Name	Pts.	Heats
1	Stefan Kurz	1	
2	Manfred Betz	0	
3	Christoph Demmel	1	
4	Frank Facher	3	
17	None		

=== Semifinal 2 ===
- June 17, 2006
- SWE Kumla

Placing	Team / Rider name	Total	1	2	3	4	5	6	7	8	9	10	11	12	13	14	15	16	Pts	17	18	19	20
1	Sweden	56	3	6	9	11	13	16	19	22	25	28	31	34	37	40	43	45		47	50	53	56
1	(13) Antonio Lindbäck	12		3					3		3							-	9			3
1	(14) Sebastian Aldén	12	3							-		3					3		9		3
1	(15) Fredrik Lindgren	15			3			3						3		3			12				3
1	(16) Ricky Kling	10				2	-						3		3				8	2
1	(20) Robert Pettersson	7					2			3								2	7
2	Czech Republic	33	1	3	4	7	10	11	13	13	15	17	18	19	21	23	25	25		28	30	31	33
2	(5) Matěj Kůs	3	1					1					1					0	3	-
2	(6) Filip Šitera	9		2			3							1			2		8			1
2	(7) Zdeněk Simota	14				3			2			2				2			9	3			2
2	(8) Hynek Štichauer	7			1					X	2				2				5		2
2	(18) -	0																	0
3	Russia	27	2	2	4	5	6	8	9	11	12	13	15	17	17	18	19	22		23	24	26	27
3	(9) Daniil Ivanov	5			2		1					1						-	4		1
3	(10) Marat Gatiyatov	4				1		2			-						1		4	-
3	(11) Ruslan Gatiyatov	3		0						-			2			1			3				-
3	(12) Aleksey Kharchenko	7	2						1					2	X				5			2
3	(19) Lenar Nigmatzyanov	8								2	1							3	6	1			1
4	Finland	4	0	1	1	1	1	1	1	2	2	2	2	2	3	3	3	4		4	4	4	4
4	(1) Rene Lehtinen	2				0				1				0				1	2				0
4	(2) Teemu Lehti	0			0				0				0				0		0	0
4	(3) Joni Keskinen	2		1				0				0			1				2			0
4	(4) Jani Eerikäinen	0	0				-				0					0			0		0
4	(17) Aarni Heikkilä	0					0												0
Placing	Team / Rider name	Total	1	2	3	4	5	6	7	8	9	10	11	12	13	14	15	16	Pts	17	18	19	20

M - exclusion for exceeding two-minute time allowance • T - exclusion for touching the tapes • X - other exclusion • E - retired or mechanical failure • F - fell

Helmet colours were permanent for each team (Red, Blue, White and Yellow/Black). Colours in diagrams indicate gate positions:
gate A – inside	gate B	gate C	gate D – outside

== Final ==
- September 17, 2006
- POL Rybnik

Placing	Team / Rider name	Total	1	2	3	4	5	6	7	8	9	10	11	12	13	14	15	16	Pts	17	18	19	20
1	Poland	41	2	3	4	5	8	10	13	15	18	19	22	25	27	30	33	34		34	35	38	41
1	(9) Krzysztof Buczkowski	5			1		3					1						-	5	X
1	(10) Adrian Miedziński	8				1		-			3						3		7		1
1	(11) Paweł Hlib	12		1						2			3			3			9			3
1	(12) Karol Ząbik	13	2						3					3	2				10				3
1	(19) Paweł Miesiąc	3						2										1	3
2	Sweden	27	3	5	5	5	5	8	8	11	12	15	15	16	19	19	21	23		23	26	26	27
2	(13) Robert Pettersson	0		-					0		-							-	0	-
2	(14) Fredrik Lindgren	14	3							3		3					2		11		3
2	(15) Sebastian Aldén	5			0			3						1		0			4				1-
2	(16) Ricky Kling	0				0	0						0		-				0			0
2	(20) Thomas H. Jonasson	8		2							1				3			2	8	X
3	Denmark	26	1	4	7	9	10	10	12	12	14	16	18	18	18	19	19	19		19	22	24	26
3	(5) Klaus Jakobsen	1	1					0					-					0	1	-
3	(6) Morten Risager	4		3			1							0			0		4		-
3	(7) Nicolai Klindt	12				2			2			2				1			7		3		2
3	(8) Henrik Møller	7			3					0	2				0				5			2
3	(18) Kenneth Hansen	2											2						2	E
4	Germany	25	0	0	2	5	7	8	9	10	10	10	11	13	14	16	17	19		22	24	25	25
4	(1) Christian Hefenbrock	10				3				1				2		2		2	10				0
4	(2) Tobias Kroner	7			2				1				1		1		1		6			1
4	(3) Kevin Wölbert	6		0				1				0			-				1	3	2
4	(4) Max Dilger	2	0				2				0					-			2	-
4	(17) Tobias Busch	0																	0
Placing	Team / Rider name	Total	1	2	3	4	5	6	7	8	9	10	11	12	13	14	15	16	Pts	17	18	19	20

M - exclusion for exceeding two-minute time allowance • T - exclusion for touching the tapes • X - other exclusion • E - retired or mechanical failure • F - fell

Helmet colours were permanent for each team (Red, Blue, White and Yellow/Black). Colours in diagrams indicate gate positions:
gate A – inside	gate B	gate C	gate D – outside

== See also ==
- 2006 Speedway World Cup
