= 2007 Team Speedway Junior World Championship =

Motorcycle racing competition

2007 Team U-21 World Championship

Seasons
- ← 2006 2008 →

The 2007 Team Speedway Junior World Championship is the third FIM Team Speedway Junior World Championship season. The Final took place on 23 September 2007 in Abensberg, Germany.

The World Championship was won by Poland U-21. It was third title for Poland. Poland team is only team who was won this competition (first staged in 2005). It was also a third title for Poland' captain Karol Ząbik and second title for Paweł Hlib and Krzysztof Buczkowski.

In the final, Poland (40 points) beat Great Britain (36 pts), Czech Republic (30 pts) and Germany (13 pts). It was first medals for the British and Czech teams. The title was won after 19th heat, when Buczkowski beat Britain's Lewis Bridger. Czech Republic lost the chance for the silver medal after the 19th when their captain Luboš Tomíček, Jr. was last.

== Calendar ==
Date	Venue	Winner	
Qualifying Rounds
3 June	(Poland) Poznań	Poland	result
3 June	(Hungary) Debrecen	(United Kingdom) Great Britain	result
Final
23 September	(Germany) Abensberg	Poland	result

== Qualification ==
=== Semifinal 1 ===
- June 3, 2007
- POL Poznań
- Jury President: (Italy) Armando Castagna
- Attendance: 3,500

Placing	Team / Rider name	Total	1	2	3	4	5	6	7	8	9	10	11	12	13	14	15	16	Pts	17	18	19	20
1	Poland	39	1	3	5	8	9	12	12	14	14	16	16	19	22	25	27	30		33	36	38	39
1	(1) Karol Ząbik	12				3				2				3				3	11				1
1	(2) Paweł Hlib	7			2				F				0				2		4		3
1	(3) Maciej Piaszczyński	10		2				3				2			3				10			-
1	(4) Marcin Jędrzejewski	1	1				-				0					-			1	-
1	(17) Mateusz Szczepaniak	9					1									3			4	3		2
2	Denmark	31	2	2	5	7	10	12	14	15	18	19	22	22	23	25	25	27		28	30	31	31
2	(9) Morten Risager	9			3		3					1						2	9				0
2	(10) Nicolai Klindt	8				2		2			3						0		7			1
2	(11) Kenneth Hansen	8		F						1			3			2			6		2
2	(12) Patrick Hougaard	6	2						2					E	1				5	1
2	(19) Klaus Jakobsen	0																	0
3	Australia	30	3	4	4	4	4	4	7	10	11	14	16	17	19	19	22	22		24	24	27	30
3	(13) Troy Batchelor	10		1					3		1							F	5	2		3
3	(14) Chris Holder	16	3							3		3		1			3		13				3
3	(15) Cory Gathercole	0			F			0						-		-			0	-
3	(16) Robert Ksiezak	0				0	-						-		-				0		-
3	(20) Trevor Harding	4					0						2		2	X			4		0
4	Russia	20	0	3	4	5	7	8	9	9	11	11	12	14	14	15	16	17		17	18	18	20
4	(5) Kirill Filinov	3	E					1					1					1	3			F
4	(6) Emil Saifutdinov	12		3			2				2			2			1		10				2
4	(7) Aleksandr Kosolapkin	3				1			1			0				-			2		1
4	(8) Roman Kantyukov	1			1					-	-				0				1	-
4	(18) Aleksey Guzaev	1								0						1			1	0
Placing	Team / Rider name	Total	1	2	3	4	5	6	7	8	9	10	11	12	13	14	15	16	Pts	17	18	19	20

M - exclusion for exceeding two-minute time allowance • T - exclusion for touching the tapes • X - other exclusion • E - retired or mechanical failure • F - fell

Helmet colours were permanent for each team (Red, Blue, White and Yellow/Black). Colours in diagrams indicate gate positions:
gate A – inside	gate B	gate C	gate D – outside

=== Semifinal 2 ===
- June 3, 2007
- HUN Debrecen

Placing	Team / Rider name	Total	1	2	3	4	5	6	7	8	9	10	11	12	13	14	15	16	Pts	17	18	19	20
1	(United Kingdom) Great Britain	41	2	4	7	9	11	14	14	17	19	21	23	26	28	29	31	34		35	38	41	41
1	(1) Edward Kennett	11				2				3				3				3	11				-
1	(2) Lewis Bridger	10			3				X				2				2		7		3
1	(3) Daniel King	12		2				3				2			2				9			3
1	(4) James Wright	8	2				2				2					1			7	1
1	(17) Ben Barker	0																	0				0
2	Czech Republic	37	3	4	4	5	8	10	13	15	16	17	20	20	23	25	26	28		31	33	35	37
2	(9) Matěj Kůs	8			F		3					1						2	6		2
2	(10) Hynek Štichauer	5				1		2			1						1		5	-
2	(11) Filip Šitera	10		1						2			3			2			8			2
2	(12) Luboš Tomíček, Jr.	14	3						3					X	3				9	3			2
2	(19) Adam Vandirek	0																	0
3	Sweden	32	1	4	6	9	10	11	11	12	15	18	19	20	21	24	27	28		28	28	29	32
3	(5) Thomas H. Jonasson	3	1					1					-					1	3			-
3	(6) Ricky Kling	5		3			1							1			-		5		X
3	(7) Billy Forsberg	12				3			X			3				3			9	0			3
3	(8) Simon Gustafsson	6			2					-	3				1				6				-
3	(18) Robin Törnqvist	6								1			1				3		5			1
4	Hungary	9	0	0	1	1	1	1	3	3	3	3	3	5	5	5	5	5		7	8	8	9
4	(13) Roland Kovacs	2		0					2		0		0					0	2			0
4	(14) Attila Lörincz	1	0				0			0		0					0		0		1
4	(15) Jozsef Tabaka	6			1			0						2		0			3	2			1
4	(16) Tamas Sike	0				N	-						-		N				0	-
4	(20) -	0																	0
Placing	Team / Rider name	Total	1	2	3	4	5	6	7	8	9	10	11	12	13	14	15	16	Pts	17	18	19	20

M - exclusion for exceeding two-minute time allowance • T - exclusion for touching the tapes • X - other exclusion • E - retired or mechanical failure • F - fell

Helmet colours were permanent for each team (Red, Blue, White and Yellow/Black). Colours in diagrams indicate gate positions:
gate A – inside	gate B	gate C	gate D – outside

== World Final ==
- September 23, 2007
- GER, Abensberg

Placing	Team / Rider name	Total	1	2	3	4	5	6	7	8	9	10	11	12	13	14	15	16	Pts	17	18	19	20
1	Poland	40	1	3	5	7	10	10	12	12	13	16	18	21	24	26	28	31		33	35	38	40
1	(1) Karol Ząbik (c)	10				2				F				3				3	8				2
1	(2) Paweł Hlib	10			2				2				2				2		8		2
1	(3) Krzysztof Buczkowski	11		2				X				3			3				8			3
1	(4) Mateusz Szczepaniak	9	1				3				1					2			7	2
1	(17) Adrian Gomólski	0																	0
2	(United Kingdom) Great Britain	36	3	6	7	10	10	13	14	16	16	18	21	21	23	26	27	29		30	31	33	36
2	(5) Edward Kennett	14	3					3					3					2	11				3
2	(6) Daniel King (c)	5		3			E							0			1		4	1
2	(7) Lewis Bridger	11				3			1			2				3			9			2
2	(8) James Wright	6			1					2	0				2				5		1
2	(18) Tai Woffinden	0																	0
3	Czech Republic	30	0	0	3	3	5	6	9	12	14	15	16	18	19	19	22	23		26	29	29	30
3	(13) Luboš Tomíček, Jr. (c)	6		0					3		2							1	6			0
3	(14) Filip Šitera	11	0							3		1					3		7	3			1
3	(15) Matěj Kůs	9			3			1						2		0			6		3
3	(16) Hynek Štichauer	4				0	2						1		1				4	-
3	(20) Martin Gavenda	0																	0
4	Germany	13	2	3	3	4	4	6	6	7	10	10	10	11	11	12	12	12		12	12	13	13
4	(9) Tobias Busch	0			0		X					-						-	0	-
4	(10) Richard Speiser	6				1		2			3						0	E	6				0
4	(11) Max Dilger	4		1						1			0			1			3			1
4	(12) Kevin Wölbert (c)	3	2						F					1	0				3		E
4	(19) Frank Facher	0										0							0	0
Placing	Team / Rider name	Total	1	2	3	4	5	6	7	8	9	10	11	12	13	14	15	16	Pts	17	18	19	20

M - exclusion for exceeding two-minute time allowance • T - exclusion for touching the tapes • X - other exclusion • E - retired or mechanical failure • F - fell

Helmet colours were permanent for each team (Red, Blue, White and Yellow/Black). Colours in diagrams indicate gate positions:
gate A – inside	gate B	gate C	gate D – outside

== See also ==
- 2007 Speedway World Cup
