= 2005 Team Speedway Junior World Championship =

Motorcycle racing competition

2005 Team U-21 World Championship

Seasons
- ← none 2006 →

The 2005 Team Speedway Junior World Championship was the 1st FIM Team Speedway Junior World Championship season. The Final took place on October 1 2005 in Pardubice, Czech Republic. World Championship was won by Poland team.

== Calendar ==
Day	Venue	Winner	
Semi-Finals
16 V	(Germany) Abensberg	Sweden	result
28 VIII	(Denmark) Holsted	Denmark	result
28 VIII	(Poland) Rybnik	Poland	result
Final
1 X	(Czech Republic) Pardubice	Poland	result

== Qualification ==
=== Semifinal 1 ===
Qualifying Round 1

- May 16th, 2005
- Motorstadion, (Germany) Abensberg
- Referee: ?

Placing	Helmet	Team	Points

1	Sweden	56

Qualify to Final			
No	Rider Name	Pts.	Heats
?	Antonio Lindbäck	15	(3,3,3,3,3)
?	Sebastian Aldén	7	(2,2,-,3,-)
?	Fredrik Lindgren	11	(3,2,3,-,3)
?	Jonas Davidsson	11	(2,-,3,3,3)
?	Eric Andersson	12	(3,3,3,3)

2	Germany	33

No	Rider Name	Pts.	Heats
?	Martin Smolinski	8	(3,1,2,T,2)
?	Christian Hefenbrock	6	(1,1,-,2,2)
?	Matthias Schultz	8	(3,2,2,X,1)
?	Thomas Stange	8	(2,-,2,2,2)
?	Tobias Kroner	3	(1,2)

3	Great Britain	24

No	Rider Name	Pts.	Heats
?	Tommy Allen	1	(1,-,-,-,-)
?	Edward Kennett	4	(1,1,1,0,1)
?	Chris Schramm	4	(2,-,1,-,1)
?	Richard Hall	6	(1,2,1,1,1)
?	Daniel King	9	(3,3,1,E,X,2)

4	Hungary and Slovenia	3

No	Rider Name	Pts.	Heats
?	Matic Voldrih	0	(0,0,X,-,-)
?	Maks Gregorič	1	(0,0,0,1,0)
?	Mate Szegedi	0	(X,-,-,X,0)
?	Roland Kovacs	0	(0,0,0,0,0)
?	Jozsef Tabaka	2	(0,0,2,0)

=== Semifinal 2 ===
- August 28, 2005
- DEN Holsted
- Australia was replaced by Denmark B

Placing	Team / Rider name	Total	1	2	3	4	5	6	7	8	9	10	11	12	13	14	15	16	Pts	17	18	19	20
1	Denmark	57	3	5	8	11	13	16	19	22	25	28	31	33	36	39	42	45		48	51	54	57
1	(5) Kenneth Bjerre	15	3					3					3					3	12			3
1	(6) Patrick Hougaard	9		2			2							2			-		6				3
1	(7) Henrik Møller	12				3			3			3				3			12		-
1	(8) Morten Risager	15			3					3	3				3				12	3
1	(18) Nicolai Klindt	6															3		3		3
2	Denmark B	28	2	5	5	7	8	9	11	11	13	15	17	17	19	19	21	21		22	24	26	28
2	(1) Steven Andersen	2				2				E				-				0	2			-
2	(2) Jan Graversen	7			T				2				2				2		6	1
2	(3) Claus Vissing	10		3				1				2			2				8				2
2	(4) Jesper Kristiansen	3	2				1				-					E			3		-
2	(17) Klaus Jacobsen	6									2			F					2		2	2
3	Norway	28	1	2	4	4	7	9	10	12	13	14	15	18	19	21	22	24		26	27	27	28
3	(13) Remu Ueland	2		1					-		1							-	2			-
3	(14) Carl Johan Raugstad	6	1							2		1					1		5			X	1
3	(15) Rune Sola	10			2			2						3		2			9		1
3	(16) Emil Omsland	1				X	-						1		-				1	-
3	(20) Jan Mikke Bjerk	9					3		1						1			2	7	2
4	Ukraine	6	0	0	1	2	2	2	2	3	3	3	3	3	3	4	4	5		5	5	6	6
4	(9) Andrey Karpov	3			1		F					0						1	2			1	0
4	(10) Sergey Senko	1				1		-			-						-		1			-
4	(11) Ivan Mironov	2		0						1			0			1			2		0
4	(12) Lyubomir Voytyk	0	0						E					E	-				0	0
4	(19) Aleksandr Pyatnichko	0																	0
Placing	Team / Rider name	Total	1	2	3	4	5	6	7	8	9	10	11	12	13	14	15	16	Pts	17	18	19	20

M - exclusion for exceeding two-minute time allowance • T - exclusion for touching the tapes • X - other exclusion • E - retired or mechanical failure • F - fell

Helmet colours were permanent for each team (Red, Blue, White and Yellow/Black). Colours in diagrams indicate gate positions:
gate A – inside	gate B	gate C	gate D – outside

=== Semifinal 3 ===
- August 28, 2005
- POL Rybnik
- France was replaced by Poland B

Placing	Team / Rider name	Total	1	2	3	4	5	6	7	8	9	10	11	12	13	14	15	16	Pts	17	18	19	20
1	Poland	52	3	5	8	11	14	16	18	21	24	27	30	32	35	38	41	41		43	46	49	52
1	(13) Karol Ząbik	6		2					2		-							0	4	2
1	(14) Paweł Hlib	12	3							3		3					3		12				-
1	(15) Krystian Klecha	10			3			2						2		-			7		3
1	(16) Janusz Kołodziej	12				3	-						3		3				9			3
1	(20) Marcin Rempała	12					3				3					3			9				3
2	Poland B	36	2	5	6	8	8	9	12	14	16	18	20	23	25	27	28	31		31	33	34	36
2	(5) Patryk Pawlaszczyk	7	2					1					2					-	5		2
2	(6) Marcin Jędrzejewski	4		3			E							-			1		4	-
2	(7) Kamil Brzozowski	11				2			3			2				2			9				2
2	(8) Sebastian Brucheiser	6			1					2	-				2				5			1
2	(18) Adrian Gomólski	8									2			3				3	8	X
3	Russia	25	1	2	4	5	6	9	10	10	11	11	12	13	14	14	16	18		21	22	24	25
3	(1) Roman Ivanov	5				1				0				1				2	4		1
3	(2) Maksim Karaychenchev	7			2				1				1				2		6				1
3	(3) Daniil Ivanov	7		1				3				0			1				5			2
3	(4) Roman Kantyukov	0	-				-				-					-			0	-
3	(17) Aleksey Kharchenko	6	1				1				1					0			3	3
4	Finland	7	0	0	0	0	2	2	2	3	3	4	4	4	4	5	5	6		7	7	7	7
4	(9) Rene Lehtinen	4			0		2					1						1	4		F
4	(10) Joni Keskinen	1				0		0			-						0		0	1
4	(11) Tero Aarnio	2		X						1			0			1			2			E
4	(12) Jani Eerikainen	0	0						-					0	0				0				-
4	(19) Petteri Koivunen	0							0		0								0				0
Placing	Team / Rider name	Total	1	2	3	4	5	6	7	8	9	10	11	12	13	14	15	16	Pts	17	18	19	20

M - exclusion for exceeding two-minute time allowance • T - exclusion for touching the tapes • X - other exclusion • E - retired or mechanical failure • F - fell

Helmet colours were permanent for each team (Red, Blue, White and Yellow/Black). Colours in diagrams indicate gate positions:
gate A – inside	gate B	gate C	gate D – outside

== Final ==
- October 1, 2005
- CZE Pardubice

Placing	Team / Rider name	Total	1	2	3	4	5	6	7	8	9	10	11	12	13	14	15	16	Pts	17	18	19	20
1	Poland	41	2	5	8	8	8	11	13	15	18	20	23	23	25	28	28	31		32	35	38	41
1	(5) Janusz Kołodziej	14	2					3					3					3	11				3
1	(6) Krystian Klecha	3		3			F							-			0		3	-
1	(7) Marcin Rempała	8				0			-			2				3			5		3
1	(8) Krzysztof Kasprzak	13			3					2	3				2				10			3
1	(18) Karol Ząbik	3							2					0					2	1
2	Sweden	35	1	3	3	5	6	8	11	14	16	19	19	22	23	25	27	29		32	33	34	35
2	(1) Antonio Lindbäck	11				2				3				3				2	10			1
2	(2) Eric Andersson	8			0				3				0				2		5	3
2	(3) Fredrik Lindgren	9		2				2				3			1				8				1
2	(4) Jonas Davidsson	7	1				1				2					2			6		1
2	(17) -	0																	0
3	Denmark	24	3	3	5	6	9	9	9	9	10	11	13	15	15	16	17	18		20	20	22	24
3	(9) Morten Risager	10			2		3					1					1	1	8				2
3	(10) Patrick Hougaard	2				1		0			1						-		2		-
3	(11) Kristian Lund	0		0						0			-			-			0	-
3	(12) Henrik Møller	7	3						T					2	E				5			2
3	(19) Nicolai Klindt	5											2			1			3	2	T
4	Czech Republic	20	0	1	2	5	7	8	9	10	10	10	11	12	15	15	18	18		18	20	20	20
4	(13) Luboš Tomíček, Jr.	2		1					1		0							0	2		-
4	(14) Filip Šitera	1	0							1		-					-		1	0
4	(15) Zdeněk Simota	5			1			1						1		X			3		2	0
4	(16) Tomáš Suchánek	12				3	2						1		3		3		12				0
4	(20) Martin Málek	0										0							0
Placing	Team / Rider name	Total	1	2	3	4	5	6	7	8	9	10	11	12	13	14	15	16	Pts	17	18	19	20

M - exclusion for exceeding two-minute time allowance • T - exclusion for touching the tapes • X - other exclusion • E - retired or mechanical failure • F - fell

Helmet colours were permanent for each team (Red, Blue, White and Yellow/Black). Colours in diagrams indicate gate positions:
gate A – inside	gate B	gate C	gate D – outside

== See also ==
- 2005 Speedway World Cup
