= 2011 Team Speedway Junior European Championship =

Motorcycle racing competition

Seasons
- ← 2010 2012 →

The 2011 Team Speedway Junior European Championship was the fourth UEM Team Speedway Junior European Championship season. The Final took place on 20 August 2011 in Lendava, Slovenia. Defending Champion are Poland team. The champion title was won by Russia team (42 points) who beat Denmark (36 pts), Sweden (26 pts) and an Adria Team, join team of Croatia and Slovakia (16 pts).

== Results ==
Because SF Two date was postponed from Saturday to Sunday, defending champion, Poland team was withdrew from the competition by Polish Motor Union (Sunday is date of the Polish Speedway Ekstraliga play-off matches). Poland was replaced by "Europe Team" (Latvia and Russia).

- Semi-Final One
- (Sweden) Eskilstuna
- 6 August 2011

| National team | Pts. |
|---|---|
| Denmark | 48 |
| Sweden | 41 |
| Germany | 18 |
| Great Britain | 13 |

- Semi-Final Two
- (Ukraine) Mototrek Hirnyk, Chervonohrad
- 7 August 2011

| National team | Pts. |
|---|---|
| Russia | 48 |
| Czech Republic | 29 |
| Latvia and Russia | 22 |
| Ukraine | 20 |

Latvia and Russia "B" as a Europe Team

- The Final
- (Slovenia) Lendava
- 20 August 2011

| Pos. | National team | Pts. |
|---|---|---|
| 1 | Russia | 42 |
| 2 | Denmark | 36 |
| 3 | Sweden | 26 |
| 4 | Slovenia and Croatia | 16 |

Slovenia and Croatia as a Adria Team

== Heat details ==
=== Semi-final one ===
- 6 August 2011
- (Sweden) Eskilstuna, Örebro County
- Smedstadion Eskilstuna (length: 335 m)
- Referee and jury president: (Denmark) Jesper Steentoft

| Placing | Team / Rider name | Total | 1 | 2 | 3 | 4 | 5 | 6 | 7 | 8 | 9 | 10 | 11 | 12 | 13 | 14 | 15 | 16 | Pts | 17 | 18 | 19 | 20 |
| 1 | Denmark | 48 | 0 | 3 | 5 | 8 | 10 | 13 | 16 | 18 | 19 | 22 | 25 | 27 | 30 | 33 | 35 | 38 | | 40 | 42 | 45 | 48 |
| 1 | (5) Mikkel B. Jensen | 12 | R | | | | | 3 | | | | | 3 | | | | | 3 | 9 | | | 3 |
| 1 | (6) Nikolaj Busk Jakobsen | 9 | | 3 | | | 2 | | | | | | | 2 | | | - | | 7 | | 2 |
| 1 | (7) Mikkel Michelsen | 12 | | | | 3 | | | 3 | | | 3 | | | | 3 | | | 12 | | | | - |
| 1 | (8) Kenni Nissen | 9 | | | 2 | | | | | 2 | - | | | | 3 | | | | 7 | 2 |
| 1 | (18) Kasper Lykke Nielsen | 6 | | | | | | | | | 1 | | | | | | 2 | | 3 | | | | 3 |
| 2 | Sweden | 41 | 3 | 5 | 8 | 10 | 13 | 15 | 16 | 19 | 21 | 23 | 23 | 26 | 28 | 30 | 33 | 34 | | 37 | 40 | 41 | 41 |
| 2 | (1) Jacob Thorssell | 10 | | | | 2 | | | | 3 | | | | 3 | | | | 1 | 9 | | | 1 |
| 2 | (2) Victor Palovaara | 4 | | | 3 | | | | 1 | | | | R | | | | - | | 4 | - |
| 2 | (3) Joel Larsson | 6 | | 2 | | | | 2 | | | | - | | | 2 | | | | 6 | | - |
| 2 | (4) Oliver Berntzon | 10 | 3 | | | | 3 | | | | 2 | | | | | 2 | | | 10 | | | | 0 |
| 2 | (17) Mathias Thoernblom | 11 | | | | | | | | | | 2 | | | | | 3 | | 5 | 3 | 3 |
| 3 | Germany | 18 | 2 | 3 | 3 | 4 | 4 | 4 | 6 | 6 | 9 | 10 | 11 | 11 | 11 | 11 | 12 | 14 | | 14 | 16 | 16 | 18 |
| 3 | (13) Kai Huckenbeck | 12 | | 1 | | | | | 2 | | 3 | | | | | | | 2 | 8 | | 2 | | 2 |
| 3 | (14) Danny Maassen | 4 | 2 | | | | | | | | | 1 | | | | | 1 | | 4 | | | 0 |
| 3 | (15) Michell Hofmann | 0 | | | 0 | | | 0 | | | | | | 0 | | 0 | | | 0 | 0 |
| 3 | (16) Andre Mochner | 2 | | | | 1 | 0 | | | | | | 1 | | 0 | | | | 2 | | - |
| 4 | Great Britain | 13 | 1 | 1 | 2 | 2 | 3 | 4 | 4 | 5 | 5 | 5 | 7 | 8 | 9 | 10 | 10 | 10 | | 11 | 12 | 12 | 13 |
| 4 | (9) Ashley Morris | 3 | | | 1 | | 1 | | | | | 0 | | | | | | 0 | 2 | | 1 |
| 4 | (10) Tom Perry | 2 | | | | 0 | | 1 | | | 0 | | | | | | 0 | | 1 | 1 |
| 4 | (11) Brendan Johnson | 5 | | 0 | | | | | | 1 | | | 2 | | | 1 | | | 4 | | | | 1 |
| 4 | (12) Joe Jacobs | 3 | 1 | | | | | | 0 | | | | | 1 | 1 | | | | 3 | | | 0 |
| 4 | (19) Ritchie Franklin | 0 | | | | | | | | | | | | | | | | | 0 |
| Placing | Team / Rider name | Total | 1 | 2 | 3 | 4 | 5 | 6 | 7 | 8 | 9 | 10 | 11 | 12 | 13 | 14 | 15 | 16 | Pts | 17 | 18 | 19 | 20 |

M - exclusion for exceeding two-minute time allowance • T - exclusion for touching the tapes • X - other exclusion • E - retired or mechanical failure • F - fell

Helmet colours were permanent for each team (Red, Blue, White and Yellow/Black). Colours in diagrams indicate gate positions:
| gate A – inside | gate B | gate C | gate D – outside |

=== Semi-final two ===
- 7 August 2011
- (Ukraine) Chervonohrad, Lviv Oblast
- Girnuk Stadium (length: 365 m)
- Referee jury president: (Poland) Wojciech Grodzki

| Placing | Team / Rider name | Total | 1 | 2 | 3 | 4 | 5 | 6 | 7 | 8 | 9 | 10 | 11 | 12 | 13 | 14 | 15 | 16 | Pts | 17 | 18 | 19 | 20 |
| 1 | Russia | 48 | 2 | 4 | 6 | 9 | 12 | 15 | 17 | 19 | 22 | 24 | 26 | 29 | 32 | 34 | 35 | 38 | | 39 | 42 | 45 | 48 |
| 1 | (5) Vladimir Borodulin | 13 | 2 | | | | | 3 | | | | | 2 | | | | | 3 | 10 | | | | 3 |
| 1 | (6) Vitaliy Belousov | 12 | | 2 | | | 3 | | | | | | | 3 | | | 1 | | 9 | | 3 |
| 1 | (7) Maxim Lobzenko | 10 | | | | 3 | | | 2 | | | 2 | | | | 2 | | | 9 | 1 |
| 1 | (8) Ilia Czałow | 13 | | | 2 | | | | | 2 | 3 | | | | 3 | | | | 10 | | | 3 |
| 1 | (18) Wiktor Kułakow | 0 | | | | | | | | | | | | | | | | | 0 |
| 2 | Czech Republic | 29 | 0 | 3 | 6 | 8 | 8 | 10 | 10 | 11 | 11 | 12 | 15 | 16 | 16 | 19 | 21 | 23 | | 25 | 27 | 27 | 29 |
| 2 | (1) Roman Čejka | 9 | | | | 2 | | | | 1 | | 1 | | 1 | | | | 2 | 7 | | | | 2 |
| 2 | (2) Ondřej Smetana | 0 | | | - | | | | N | | | | - | | | | - | | 0 | | - |
| 2 | (3) None | 0 | | - | | | | - | | | | - | | | N | | | | 0 | - |
| 2 | (4) Ondrej Veverka | 5 | 0 | | | | 0 | | | | R | | | | | 3 | 2 | | 5 | | | 0 |
| 2 | (17) Václav Milík, Jr. | 15 | | 3 | 3 | | | 2 | | | | | 3 | | | | | | 11 | 2 | 2 |
| 3 | Latvia and Russia | 22 | 1 | 2 | 2 | 3 | 5 | 5 | 6 | 9 | 10 | 13 | 14 | 14 | 15 | 16 | 19 | 19 | | 19 | 20 | 22 | 22 |
| 3 | (13) Ivans Plešakovs | 4 | | 1 | | | | | 1 | | 1 | | | | | | | 0 | 3 | | 1 |
| 3 | (14) Andžejs Ļebedevs | 10 | 1 | | | | | | | 3 | | 3 | | | | | 3 | | 10 | | | | F |
| 3 | (15) Andrey Chindilov | 1 | | | 0 | | | 0 | | | | | | 0 | | 1 | | | 1 | 0 |
| 3 | (16) Dmitriy Lemza | 7 | | | | 1 | 2 | | | | | | 1 | | 1 | | | | 5 | | | 2 |
| 4 | Ukraine | 20 | 3 | 3 | 4 | 4 | 5 | 6 | 9 | 9 | 11 | 11 | 11 | 13 | 15 | 15 | 15 | 16 | | 19 | 19 | 20 | 20 |
| 4 | (9) Volodymyr Teigal | 3 | | | 1 | | 1 | | | | | 0 | | | | | | 1 | 3 | | | | - |
| 4 | (10) Stanisław Melniczuk | 4 | | | | T | | 1 | | | 2 | | | | | | 0 | | 3 | | | 1 |
| 4 | (11) Pawło Kondratiuk | 0 | | 0 | | | | | | 0 | | | 0 | | | 0 | | | 0 | | 0 |
| 4 | (12) None | 0 | - | | | | | | - | | | | | - | - | | | | 0 | - |
| 4 | (19) Aleksandr Loktaev | 13 | 3 | | | | | | 3 | | | | | 2 | 2 | | | | 10 | 3 | | | X |
| Placing | Team / Rider name | Total | 1 | 2 | 3 | 4 | 5 | 6 | 7 | 8 | 9 | 10 | 11 | 12 | 13 | 14 | 15 | 16 | Pts | 17 | 18 | 19 | 20 |

M - exclusion for exceeding two-minute time allowance • T - exclusion for touching the tapes • X - other exclusion • E - retired or mechanical failure • F - fell

Helmet colours were permanent for each team (Red, Blue, White and Yellow/Black). Colours in diagrams indicate gate positions:
| gate A – inside | gate B | gate C | gate D – outside |

=== The final ===
- 20 August 2011
- (Slovenia) Lendava, Prekmurje
- Športni Park Petršovci Pri Lendavi (length: 398 m)
- Referee: (Austria) Susanne Hüttinger
- Jury president: (Denmark) B. Thomsen

| Placing | Team / Rider name | Total | 1 | 2 | 3 | 4 | 5 | 6 | 7 | 8 | 9 | 10 | 11 | 12 | 13 | 14 | 15 | 16 | Pts | 17 | 18 | 19 | 20 |
| 1 | Russia | 42 | 0 | 2 | 3 | 6 | 9 | 11 | 14 | 15 | 18 | 20 | 21 | 23 | 25 | 28 | 30 | 32 | | 34 | 36 | 39 | 42 |
| 1 | (13) Vitaliy Belousov | 13 | | 2 | | | | | 3 | | 3 | | | | | | | 2 | 10 | | | | 3 |
| 1 | (14) Maxim Lobzenko | 0 | 0 | | | | | | | - | | - | | | | | 0 | | 0 | - |
| 1 | (15) Ilija Czałow | 10 | | | 1 | | | 2 | | | | | | 2 | | 3 | | | 8 | | 2 |
| 1 | (16) Vladimir Borodulin | 12 | | | | 3 | 3 | | | | | | 1 | | 2 | | | | 9 | | | 3 |
| 1 | (20) Vadim Tarasenko | 7 | | | | | | | | 1 | | 2 | | | | | 2 | | 5 | 2 |
| 2 | Denmark | 36 | 3 | 3 | 5 | 7 | 9 | 12 | 13 | 16 | 16 | 19 | 21 | 24 | 27 | 28 | 28 | 31 | | 31 | 34 | 34 | 36 |
| 2 | (1) Nikolaj Busk Jakobsen | 2 | | | | 2 | | | | - | | | | - | | | | - | 2 | 0 |
| 2 | (2) Jonas B. Andersen | 4 | | | 2 | | | | - | | | | 2 | | | | 0 | | 4 | | - |
| 2 | (3) Mikkel Michelsen | 11 | | R | | | | 3 | | | | 3 | | | 3 | | | | 9 | | | | 2 |
| 2 | (4) Mikkel B. Jensen | 6 | 3 | | | | 2 | | | | T | | | | | 1 | | | 6 | | | F |
| 2 | (17) Michael Jepsen Jensen | 13 | | | | | | | 1 | 3 | | | | 3 | | | | 3 | 10 | | 3 |
| 3 | Sweden | 26 | 1 | 2 | 5 | 6 | 7 | 8 | 8 | 10 | 11 | 12 | 15 | 15 | 15 | 17 | 20 | 20 | | 23 | 24 | 25 | 26 |
| 3 | (9) Joel Larsson | 5 | | | 3 | | 1 | | | | | 1 | | | | | | 0 | 5 | | | - |
| 3 | (10) Oliver Berntzon | 4 | | | | 1 | | 1 | | | 1 | | | | | | - | | 3 | | - | 1 |
| 3 | (11) Jacob Thorssell | 10 | | 1 | | | | | | - | | | 3 | | | 2 | 3 | | 9 | | | | 1 |
| 3 | (12) Victor Palovaara | 1 | 1 | | | | | | 0 | | | | | | 0 | | | | 1 | - |
| 3 | (19) Mathias Thoernblom | 6 | | | | | | | | 2 | | | | F | | | | | 2 | 3 | 1 |
| 4 | Slovenia and Croatia | 16 | 2 | 5 | 5 | 5 | 5 | 5 | 7 | 7 | 9 | 9 | 9 | 10 | 11 | 11 | 12 | 13 | | 14 | 14 | 16 | 16 |
| 4 | (5) Matic Ivačič | 6 | 2 | | | | | 0 | | | | | 0 | | 1 | | | 1 | 4 | | | 2 |
| 4 | (6) Jasmin Ilijas | 4 | | 3 | | | R | | | | | 0 | | 1 | | | - | | 4 | | | | 0 |
| 4 | (7) Ladislav Vida | 0 | | | | 0 | | | - | | | - | | | | - | | | 0 | | - |
| 4 | (8) Kristian Revinsek | 0 | | | 0 | | | | | 0 | - | | | | - | | | | 0 | - |
| 4 | (18) Dino Kovacic | 6 | | | | | | | 2 | | 2 | | | | | 0 | 1 | | 5 | 1 | 0 |
| Placing | Team / Rider name | Total | 1 | 2 | 3 | 4 | 5 | 6 | 7 | 8 | 9 | 10 | 11 | 12 | 13 | 14 | 15 | 16 | Pts | 17 | 18 | 19 | 20 |

M - exclusion for exceeding two-minute time allowance • T - exclusion for touching the tapes • X - other exclusion • E - retired or mechanical failure • F - fell

Helmet colours were permanent for each team (Red, Blue, White and Yellow/Black). Colours in diagrams indicate gate positions:
| gate A – inside | gate B | gate C | gate D – outside |

== See also ==
- 2011 Team Speedway Junior World Championship
- 2011 Individual Speedway Junior European Championship
