= 2010 Team Speedway Junior European Championship =

European motorcycle speedway competition

Seasons
- ← 2009 2011 →

The 2010 Team Speedway Junior European Championship will be the third UEM Team Speedway Junior European Championship season. The Final took place on 8 August 2010 in Divišov, Czech Republic. The Championship was won by the defending Champion Poland (56 pts) who they beat Sweden (25 pts), host team Czech Republic (23 pts) and Ukraine (16 pts). It was second champion title for Patryk Dudek, Maciej Janowski and Przemysław Pawlicki.

== Results ==
- Semi-Final One
- (Germany) Norden
- 24 May 2010

Pos.	National team	Pts.
1	Sweden	22
2	Denmark	14
3	Germany	11
4	Croatia / Slovenia	9

- Semi-Final Two
- (Ukraine) Mototrek Hirnyk, Chervonohrad
- 31 July 2010

Pos.	National team	Pts.
	Poland	50
	Ukraine	32
	Russia	30
	Finland	8

- The Final
- (Czech Republic) Divišov
- 7 August 2010

Pos.	National team	Pts.
1	Poland	56
2	Sweden	25
3	Czech Republic	23
4	Ukraine	16

== Heat details ==
=== Semi-Final One ===
- 24 May 2010
- GER Norden, Lower Saxony
- Motodrom Halbemond (Length: 396 m)
- Referee and Jury President: (Hungary) Istvan Darago
- References

Placing	Team / Rider name	Total	1	2	3	4	5	6	7	8	9	10	11	12	13	14	15	16	Pts	17	18	19	20
1	Sweden	22	2	5	6	9	11	14	17	17	20	22	22	22	22	22	22	22		22	22	22	22
1	(5) Dennis Andersson	5	2					3											5
1	(6) Pontus Aspgren	5		3			2												5
1	(7) Anton Rosén	8				3			3			2							8
1	(8) Anders Mellgren	4			1					X	3								4
1	(18) Anton Gothberg	0																	0
2	Denmark	14	3	5	7	9	12	14	14	14	14	14	14	14	14	14	14	14		14	14	14	14
2	(1) Lasse Bjerre	2				2				X									2
2	(2) Thomas Jorgensen	2			2				F										2
2	(3) Jesper B. Andersen	4		2				2				M							4
2	(4) Michael Jepsen Jensen	6	3				3				Fx								6
2	(17) Patrick Bjerregaard	0																	0
3	Germany	11	1	2	2	3	3	4	6	9	10	11	11	11	11	11	11	11		11	11	11	11
3	(13) Kai Huckenbeck	1		1					F/-		-								1
3	(14) René Deddens	5	1							3		1							5
3	(15) Marcel Helfer	2			R			1			1								2
3	(16) Danny Maaßen	1				1	0												1
3	(20) Michel Hofmann	2							2										2
4	Croatia / Slovenia	9	0	0	3	3	4	4	4	4	6	9	9	9	9	9	9	9		9	9	9	9
4	(9) Dino Kovacic	7			3		1					3							7
4	(10) Ladislav Vida	0				0		0			-								0
4	(11) Nejc Malesic	0		0						Fx									0
4	(12) Aljosa Remih	2	Fx						-		2								2
4	(19) Matic Ivacic	0							Fx										0
Placing	Team / Rider name	Total	1	2	3	4	5	6	7	8	9	10	11	12	13	14	15	16	Pts	17	18	19	20

M - exclusion for exceeding two-minute time allowance • T - exclusion for touching the tapes • X - other exclusion • E - retired or mechanical failure • F - fell

Helmet colours were permanent for each team (Red, Blue, White and Yellow/Black). Colours in diagrams indicate gate positions:
gate A – inside	gate B	gate C	gate D – outside

=== Semi-Final Two ===
- 31 July 2010
- UKR Chervonohrad, Lviv Oblast
- Referee and Jury President: (Sweden) K.Gardell
- References

Placing	Team / Rider name	Total	1	2	3	4	5	6	7	8	9	10	11	12	13	14	15	16	Pts	17	18	19	20
1	Poland	50	3	6	9	12	15	18	21	22	24	25	27	29	32	35	38	41		44	47	48	50
1	(5) Maciej Janowski	13	3					3					2					3	11				2
1	(6) Patryk Dudek	11		3			3							2			3		11			-
1	(7) Przemysław Pawlicki	12				3			3			-				3			9		3
1	(8) Kacper Gomólski	11			3					-	2				3				8	3
1	(18) Emil Pulczyński	3								1		1							2			1
2	Ukraine	32	2	2	4	5	7	9	11	13	14	17	18	21	23	25	26	27		29	30	32	32
2	(9) Volodymyr Teygel	10			2		2			2		3						1	10				R
2	(10) Andriy Kobrin	8				1		2			1					2	1		7		1
2	(11) Serhiy Borysenko	1		0						-			1			-			1	-
2	(12) Kiryl Cukanov	13	2						2					3	2				9	2		2
2	(19) Taras Fedorenko	0																	0
3	Russia	30	1	2	3	5	6	7	7	10	13	13	16	17	17	17	19	21		22	24	27	30
3	(13) Sergey Karachinchev	5		1					-		-							2	3		2
3	(14) Andrey Kudryashov	7	1							3		0					-		4				3
3	(15) Vitaliy Belousov	3			1			1						1		0			3			-
3	(16) Maxim Lobzenko	2				-	1						-		Fx				1	1
3	(20) Aleksandr Loktaev	13				2			R2		3		3				2		10			3
4	Finland	8	0	2	2	2	2	2	3	3	3	5	5	5	6	7	7	7		7	7	7	8
4	(1) Kalle Katajisto	0				N				N				N				N	0	N
4	(2) Timo Lahti	1			0				1				R				0		1			0
4	(3) Niko Siltaniemi	7		2				0				2			1	1			6				1
4	(4) Mika Loppi	0	0				0				0					F/-			0		N
Placing	Team / Rider name	Total	1	2	3	4	5	6	7	8	9	10	11	12	13	14	15	16	Pts	17	18	19	20

M - exclusion for exceeding two-minute time allowance • T - exclusion for touching the tapes • X - other exclusion • E - retired or mechanical failure • F - fell

Helmet colours were permanent for each team (Red, Blue, White and Yellow/Black). Colours in diagrams indicate gate positions:
gate A – inside	gate B	gate C	gate D – outside

=== The Final ===
- 7 August 2010
- CZE Divišov, Central Bohemian Region
- Referee: (Hungary) Istvan Darago
- Jury President: (Poland) Andrzej Grodzki
- References

Placing	Team / Rider name	Total	1	2	3	4	5	6	7	8	9	10	11	12	13	14	15	16	Pts	17	18	19	20
1	Poland	56	3	6	9	12	15	18	21	21	24	27	30	33	36	39	42	45		48	51	54	56
1	(5) Maciej Janowski	15	3					3					3					3	12		3
1	(6) Patryk Dudek	15		3			3							3			3		12			3
1	(7) Przemysław Pawlicki	14				3			3			3				3			12				2
1	(8) Patryk Gomólski	12			3					-	3				3				9	3
1	(18) Łukasz Cyran	0								Fx									0
2	Sweden	25	0	0	1	2	4	5	5	8	9	11	12	14	15	15	17	19		19	20	22	25
2	(1) Anton Rosén	12				1				3				2	1			2	9				3
2	(2) Andre Hertzberg	4			1				T				-				2		3		1
2	(3) Alexander Edberg	5		X				1				2			-				3			2
2	(4) Sebastian Carlsson	1	0				-				1					T			1	-
2	(17) Victor Palovaara	3					2						1						3	Fx
3	Czech Republic	23	1	3	3	5	6	8	9	11	11	12	14	14	14	16	16	17		19	21	22	23
3	(13) Jan Holub III	7		2					1		0							1	4	2		1
3	(14) Roman Čejka	4	1							2		1			0		0		4				-
3	(15) Jakub Fencl	0			-			-						R		-			0	-
3	(16) Pavol Pucko	3				2	1						-		-				3		-
3	(20) Václav Milík, Jr.	9			R2			2					2			2			6		2		1
4	Ukraine	16	2	3	5	5	5	5	7	8	10	10	10	11	13	14	15	15		16	16	16	16
4	(9) Andriy Kobrin	3			2		0					0					1	Fx	3		0
4	(10) None	0				N		N			-						-		0	-
4	(11) Sergiy Borysenko	4		1						1			Fx			1			3	1		0
4	(12) Kiril Tcukanov	9	2						2		2			1	2				9				0
Placing	Team / Rider name	Total	1	2	3	4	5	6	7	8	9	10	11	12	13	14	15	16	Pts	17	18	19	20

M - exclusion for exceeding two-minute time allowance • T - exclusion for touching the tapes • X - other exclusion • E - retired or mechanical failure • F - fell

Helmet colours were permanent for each team (Red, Blue, White and Yellow/Black). Colours in diagrams indicate gate positions:
gate A – inside	gate B	gate C	gate D – outside

== See also ==
- 2010 Team Speedway Junior World Championship
- 2010 Individual Speedway Junior European Championship
