= Sweden national under-19 speedway team =

National sports team

Sweden
- Association: Svenska Motorcykel- och Snöskoterförbundet
- FIM code: SVEMO
- Team manager: Daniel Nelson
- Nation colour: Blue and Yellow

European Championships
Team U-19	1	1	—
- Best result: Champion (2008)
Individual U-19	2	—	4
- Best result: Champion (2004, 2010)

The Sweden national under-19 speedway team is the national under-19 speedway team of Sweden and is controlled by the SVEMO. The team has won the Team Speedway Junior European Championship once in 2008. Sweden has produced two Individual U-19 European Champion - Antonio Lindbäck (2004) and Dennis Andersson (2010). Lindbäck won a bronze medal also, just like Daniel Davidsson, Fredrik Lindgren and Robert Pettersson.

== Competition ==
Team Speedway Junior European Championship
Year	Venue	Place	Pts.	Riders
2008	(Poland) Rawicz	1st	36	Linus Eklöf (11), Ludvig Lindgren (10), Simon Gustafsson (9), Linus Sundström (6), Niklas Larsson (—); Kim Nilsson was a team member in the Semi-Final.
2009	(Denmark) Grindsted	2nd	38	Simon Gustafsson (12), Dennis Andersson (8), Ludvig Lindgren (7), Anton Rosén (6), Linus Sundström (5)
2010	(Czech Republic) Divišov			
2011	TBA			

Individual Speedway Junior European Championship
Year	Venue	Medal(s)	Riders
1998	(Slovenia) Krško	—	Freddie Eriksson (9th)
1999	(Poland) Gniezno	—	—
2000	(Slovenia) Ljubljana	—	Jonas Davidsson (6th), Eric Andersson (13th)
2001	(Czech Republic) Pardubice	3rd	Daniel Davidsson (3rd), Mattias Nilsson (7th), Peter Ljung (8th)
2002	(Latvia) Daugavpils	3rd	Fredrik Lindgren (3rd), Jonas Davidsson (6th), Daniel Davidsson (10th), Antonio Lindbäck (11th)
2003	(Germany) Pocking	3rd	Antonio Lindbäck (3rd), Fredrik Lindgren (4th), Sebastian Aldén (7th), Eric Andersson (10th)
2004	(Poland) Rybnik	1st	Antonio Lindbäck (1st), Fredrik Lindgren (4th), Tomas Messing (15th)
2005	(Czech Republic) Mšeno	3rd	Robert Pettersson (3rd), Ricky Kling (5th), Andreas Messing (9th), Robin Törnqvist (15th)
2006	(Croatia) Goričan	—	Ricky Kling (5th), Robert Pettersson (—)
2007	(Poland) Częstochowa	—	Thomas H. Jonasson (5th), Linus Sundström (14th)
2008	(Germany) Stralsund	—	Dennis Andersson (7th), Linus Eklöf (8th), Kim Nilsson (9th)
2009	(Poland) Tarnów	—	Dennis Andersson (7th), Linus Sundström (8th), Kim Nilsson (14th)
2010	(Croatia) Goričan	1st	Dennis Andersson (1st), Alexander Edberg (—)

== See also ==
- Sweden national speedway team
- Sweden national under-21 speedway team
