= 2016 Team Speedway Junior European Championship =

2016 motorcycle competition

Seasons
- ← 2015 2017 →

The 2016 Team Speedway Junior European Championship was the ninth Team Speedway Junior European Championship season. It was organised by the Fédération Internationale de Motocyclisme and was the fifth as an under 21 years of age event.

The final took place on 28 August 2016 in Stralsund, Germany. The defending champions Poland won the final once again to record their fifth consecutive title.

== Results ==
=== Final ===
- (Germany) Paul Greifzu Stadium, Stralsund
- 28 August 2016

Pos.	National team	Pts.	Scorers
1	Poland	46	Bartosz Smektała 14, Kacper Woryna 13, Dominik Kubera 10, Rafał Karczmarz 9, Daniel Kaczmarek 0
2	Denmark	35	Andreas Lyager 8, Kasper Andersen 6, Frederik Jakobsen 2, Jonas Jeppesen 2, Mikkel B. Andersen 1
3	Germany	25	Dominik Moeser 10, Michael Härtel 6, Lukas Fienhage 5, Daniel Spiller 4, Erik Riss 3
4	Sweden	14	Kenny Wennerstam 4, Filip Hjelmland 4, Joel Andersson 3, Alex Johansson 2, Joel Kling 0

== See also ==
- 2016 Team Speedway Junior World Championship
- 2016 Individual Speedway Junior European Championship
