= Latvia national under-19 speedway team =

Latvia
- Association: Latvian Motorcyclists Federation; Latvijas Motosporta Federācija
- FIM code: LaMSF

European Championships
Team U-19	—	—	—
- Best result: never qualify to the final
Individual U-19	—	1	—
- Best result: 2nd - Ķasts Poudžuks (2005)

The Latvia national under-19 speedway team is the national under-19 motorcycle speedway team of Latvia and is controlled by the Latvian Motorcyclists Federation (LaMSF). The team never qualify to the Team Speedway Junior European Championship Final. In the Individual competition silver medal was won by Ķasts Poudžuks in 2005.

== Competition ==
Team Speedway Junior European Championship
Year	Place	Pts.	Riders
2008	—	—	3rd place in Semi-Final Two; Maksims Bogdanovs, Jevgēņijs Karavackis, Vjačeslavs Giruckis, Jevgeņijs Petuhovs
2009	—	—	did not enter

== Riders ==
Riders who started in Individual Speedway Junior European Championship Finals:

- Leonīds Paura (2002 - 13th)
- Ķasts Poudžuks (2002 - track reserve, 2004 - 5th, 2005 - 2nd)
- Maksims Bogdanovs (2005 - 17th, 2007 - 12th)
- Jevgēņijs Karavackis (2009 - 10th)

== See also ==
- Latvia national speedway team
- Latvia national under-21 speedway team
