= 2019 Team Speedway Junior European Championship =

2019 motorcycle competition

The 2019 Team Speedway Junior European Championship was the 12th Team Speedway Junior European Championship season. It was organised by the Fédération Internationale de Motocyclisme and was the 8th as an under 21 years of age event.

The final took place on 28 September 2019 at the Piste de Speedway de Lamothe Landerron in Lamothe-Landerron, France. The defending champions Denmark and eight times winners Poland both finished on 50 points each. As a result, a run-off was required and Poland's Jakub Miśkowiak beat Jonas Seifert-Salk to reclaim the title for Poland.

== Results ==
=== Final ===
- (France) Lamothe-Landerron
- 28 September 2019

Pos.	National team	Pts.	Scorers
1	Poland	50	Jakub Miśkowiak 14, Dominik Kubera 14, Wiktor Trofimov Jr. 12, Wiktor Lampart 6, Mateusz Cierniak 4
2	Denmark	50	Mads Hansen 14, Jonas Seifert 13, Tim Sørensen 12, Jason Jorgensen 11, Jonas Jeppesen dnr
3	Sweden	16	Christoffer Selvin 5, Emil Millberg 5, William Bjorling 4, Filip Hjelmland 2
4	France	4	Enzo Dubernard 2, Thomas Valladon 1, Steven Goret 1, Baptiste Comblon 0, Mathias Trésarrieu 0

Gold Medal Run-Off: Miskowiak beat Seifert.

== See also ==
- 2019 Team Speedway Junior World Championship
- 2019 Individual Speedway Junior European Championship
