= Croatia national under-21 speedway team =

Croatia
- Association: Croatian Motorcycle Federation; Hrvatski Motociklisticki Savez
- FIM code: HMS
- Team manager: Zvonko Pavlic
- Nation colour: Red, White and Blue

World Championships
Team U-21	—	—	—
- Best result: QR 3rd placed (2009)
Individual U-21	—	1	1
- Best result: 2nd - Jurica Pavlic (2009)

The Croatia national under-21 speedway team is the national under-21 motorcycle speedway team of Croatia and is controlled by the Croatian Motorcycle Federation. Croatian riders was started in Under-21 World Cup once, in 2009 with Slovenian riders as "Adria" team. The best Croatian rider is Jurica Pavlic who was won two medals in Individual competition (silver medal in 2009 in Goričan, Croatia).

== Competition ==
Team Speedway Junior World Championship
Year	Place	Pts.	Riders
2004–2008			Did not enter
2009	-	-	3rd place in Qualifying Round Two; Nikola Pigac (4), Renato Cvetko (1), Dalibor Bot (0) and two Slovenian riders (14)

== See also ==
- Croatia national speedway team
- Croatia national under-19 speedway team
