= France national under-19 speedway team =

France
- Association: French Motorcycle Federation; Fédération Française de Motocyclisme
- FIM code: FFM
- Nation colour: Blue, White and Red

European Championships
Team U-19	—	—	—
- Best result: never qualify to the final
Individual U-19	—	—	—
- Best result: 11th - Mathieu Tresarrieu (2005)

The France national under-19 speedway team is the national under-19 motorcycle speedway team of France and is controlled by the French Motorcycling Federation. The team participated in the 2008 Team Speedway Junior European Championship, but failed to qualify for the final. Only one rider, Mathieu Tresarrieu, has qualified for the Individual competition final (twice, in 2004 and 2005).

== Competition ==
Team Speedway Junior European Championship
Year	Place	Pts.	Riders
2008	—	—	4th place in Qualifying Round One; Theo di Palma (5), Maxime Mazeau (4), Benoit Lorenzon (0)
2009			Did not enter

== Riders ==
Riders who started in Individual Speedway Junior European Championship:

- Mathieu Tresarrieu (2004 - 16th, 2005 - 11th)
- Pavol Pucko (2008)
- Theo di Palma (2009)
- Maxime Mazeau (2009)

== See also ==
- France national speedway team
- France national under-21 speedway team
