= René Deddens =

German speedway rider

- Born: 28 June 1992 (age 32); Cloppenburg, Germany
- Nationality: German

Career history

Germany
- 2006–2010: Diedenbergen
- 2012: MC Güstrow
- 2022–2024: Cloppenburg

Denmark
- 2009: Holstebro

René Deddens (born 28 June 1992) is a motorcycle speedway rider from Germany. He was a member of the German junior national team.

== Career ==
=== World Championships ===
- Individual U-21 World Championship
  - 2009 - 11th place in the Qualifying Round 1
  - 2010 - 12th place in the Qualifying Round 1

=== European Championships ===
- Team U-19 European Championship
  - 2009 - 3rd place in the Semi-Final
  - 2010 - 3rd place in the Semi-Final

== See also ==
- Germany national speedway team
