= 2017 Team Speedway Junior European Championship =

2017 motorcycle competition

The 2017 Team Speedway Junior European Championship was the 10th Team Speedway Junior European Championship season. It was organised by the Fédération Internationale de Motocyclisme and was the 6th as an under 21 years of age event.

The final took place on 16 September 2017 in Krosno, Poland. The defending champions Poland won the final once again to record their sixth consecutive title.

== Results ==
=== Final ===
- (Poland) Krosno
- 16 September 2017

Pos.	National team	Pts.	Scorers
1	Poland	45	Rafał Karczmarz 14, Bartosz Smektała 11, Dominik Kubera 10, Kacper Woryna 9, Jakub Miśkowiak 1
2	Denmark	35	Frederik Jakobsen 12, Mikkel B. Andersen 11, Tim Sørensen 6, Kasper Andersen 4, Mads Hansen 2
3	Latvia	33	Davis Kurmis 10, Jevgenijs Kostygovs 10, Oļegs Mihailovs 7, Artem Trofimov 6
4	Germany	6	Lukas Fienhage 4, Michael Härtel 2, Daniel Spiller 0, Dominik Moser 0, Richard Geyer 0

== See also ==
- 2017 Team Speedway Junior World Championship
- 2017 Individual Speedway Junior European Championship
