= 2018 Team Speedway Junior European Championship =

2018 motorcycle competition

The 2018 Team Speedway Junior European Championship was the 11th Team Speedway Junior European Championship season. It was organised by the Fédération Internationale de Motocyclisme and was the 7th as an under 21 years of age event.

The final took place on 1 September 2018 in Daugavpils, Latvia. The defending champions Poland finally lost after six consecutive title wins. The winners were Denmark.

== Results ==
=== Final ===
- (Latvia) Daugavpils
- 1 September 2018

Pos.	National team	Pts.	Scorers
1	Denmark	45	Frederik Jakobsen 13, Patrick Hansen 12, Mads Hansen 11, Andreas Lyager 9, Jonas Seifert-Salk dnr
2	Poland	37	Wiktor Lampart 12, Rafal Karczmarz 10, Dominik Kubera 9, Igor Kopec-Sobczynski 3, Daniel Kaczmarek 3
3	Latvia	21	Oļegs Mihailovs 9, Artem Trofimov 4, Davis Kurmis 4, Ernest Matjuszonok 4, Elvis Avgucevics dnr
4	Sweden	16	Joel Kling 7, Alexander Woentin 3, Anton Karlsson 3, Christoffer Selvin 2, Emil Millberg 1

== See also ==
- 2018 Team Speedway Junior World Championship
- 2018 Individual Speedway Junior European Championship
