= Croatia national under-19 speedway team =

Croatia
- Association: Croatian Motorcycle Federation; Hrvatski Motociklisticki Savez
- FIM code: HMS
- Team manager: Zvonko Pavlic
- Team captain: Jurica Pavlic
- Nation colour: Red, White and Blue

European Championships
Team U-19	—	—	—
- Best result: never qualify to the final
Individual U-19	1	1	—
- Best result: 1st - Jurica Pavlic (2006)

The Croatia national under-19 speedway team is the national under-19 motorcycle speedway team of Croatia and is controlled by the Croatian Motorcycle Federation. Croatian riders was started in Team U-19 European Championship once, in 2008. The best Croatian rider is Jurica Pavlic who was won two medals in Individual competition (gold medal in 2006 in Goričan, Croatia).

== Competition ==
Team Speedway Junior European Championship
Year	Place	Pts.	Riders
2008	-	-	3rd place in Semi Final One; Jurica Pavlic (18), Nikola Pigac (4), Renato Cvetko (3), Andrej Kezman (3), Nikola Martinec (0)
2009			Did not enter

== See also ==
- Croatia national speedway team
- Croatia national under-21 speedway team
