= Jevgēņijs Karavackis =

Latvian speedway rider (born 1990)

Jevgenijs Karavackis
- Born: August 11, 1990 (age 36); Daugavpils, Latvia
- Nationality: Latvia

Current club information
- Polish league: Lokomotiv Daugavpils (1st League)

Career history
- 2007-: Daugavpils (POL)

Jevgēņijs Karavackis (born 11 August 1990) is a Latvian motorcycle speedway rider and member of the Latvian national team.

== Career details ==
=== World Championships ===
- Individual U-21 World Championship
  - 2008 - 9th place in the qualifying round 3
  - 2010 - 8th place in the qualifying round 1

=== European Championships ===
- Individual European Championship
  - 2009 - (Russia) Tolyatti - 11th place (4 pts)
- Individual U-19 European Championship
  - 2009 - (Poland) Tarnów - 10th place (6 pts)
- Team U-19 European Championship
  - 2008 - 3rd place in the qualifying round 2
- European Club Champions' Cup
  - 2008 - 3rd place in the semi-final for Szachtar Czerwonograd

=== Domestic competitions ===
- Team Polish Championship (League)
  - 2007 - 2nd place in the Second League for Daugavpils (Average 1.458)
  - 2008 - 5th place in the First League for Daugavpils (Average 1.400)
  - 2009 - for Daugavpils

== See also ==
- Latvia national speedway team
