= 2010 Speedway Under-21 World Championship =

European motorcycle speedway event

World Under-21 Championship
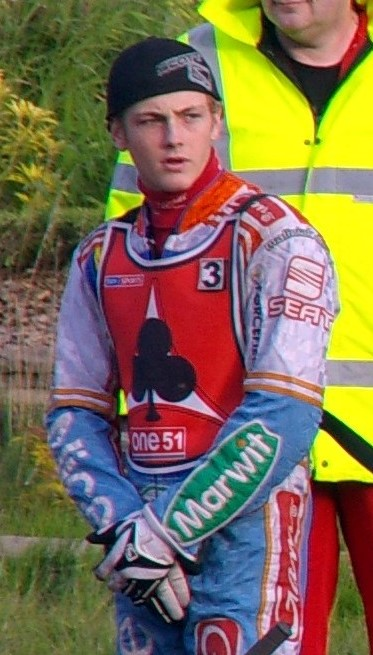
- Darcy Ward successfully defended his title

The 2010 Individual Speedway Junior World Championship was the 34th edition of the FIM World motorcycle speedway Under-21 Championships.

For the first time a champion would be determined from three races between 17 July and 2 October 2010.

Three riders (the 2009 Champion Darcy Ward, Maciej Janowski and Maksims Bogdanovs all tied on 30 points after the three races meaning a run-off was needed to decide the medals. Ward became the second rider to win the Under-21 World Champion title twice, after Emil Sayfutdinov (2007 and 2008 champion) after beating Janowksi and Bogdanovs in the run-off.

== Qualification ==
In five Qualifying round was started 80 riders and to Semi-finals was qualify top 6 from each meetings. This 30 riders and 2 riders from Semi-final' host federations (Matija Duh of Slovenia and Kevin Wölbert of Germany) was started in two Semi-finals. The top 7 riders from both SF was automatically qualify for all Final meetings.

== Riders ==
There were fourteen permanent riders (riders placed 1st to 7th in both semi finals was automatically qualify for all Final meetings). Two Wild Card riders was nominated to each final meeting (approval and nomination by CCP Bureau). Two Track Reserve riders was nominated by national federation.

In case of the absence of one or more riders in the final meetings, the first available Qualified Substitute rider or riders was elevated for that meeting, and take the place(s) of the relevant missing rider(s). The list of Qualified Substitute riders should by published by the CCP after the Semi-finals.

A starting position draw for each final meeting was balloted by the FIM.

=== Permanent riders ===
Top 7 riders from Semi-final One in Krško, Slovenia

1. (Latvia) Maksims Bogdanovs (21)
2. (Denmark) Patrick Hougaard (21)
3. (Russia) Vadim Tarasenko (16)
4. (Poland) Patryk Dudek (18)
5. (Russia) Artem Laguta (20)
6. (Czech Republic) Matěj Kůs (21)
7. (Croatia) Jurica Pavlic (21)

Top 7 riders from Semi-final Two in Landshut, Germany

1. (Sweden) Dennis Andersson (19)
2. (Slovakia) Martin Vaculík (20)
3. (Poland) Maciej Janowski (19)
4. (Germany) Frank Facher (21)
5. (Germany) Kevin Wölbert (21)
6. (Denmark) René Bach (20)
7. (Australia) Darcy Ward (18)

== Final Series ==
#	Date	Venue	Winners	Runner-up	3rd place
1	July 17	(Poland) Gdańsk	(Latvia) Maksims Bogdanovs (9 pts)	(Denmark) Patrick Hougaard (8 pts)	(Croatia) Jurica Pavlic (6 pts)
2	August 14	(Latvia) Daugavpils	(Australia) Darcy Ward (12 pts)	(Latvia) Maksims Bogdanovs (12 pts)	(Russia) Artem Laguta (11 pts)
3	October 2	(Czech Republic) Pardubice	(Poland) Maciej Janowski (14 pts)	(Australia) Darcy Ward (13 pts)	(Slovakia) Martin Vaculík (12 pts)

=== Final One ===
- 17 July 2010
- (Poland) Zbigniew Podlecki Stadium, Gdańsk
- Referee: Jim Lawrence / Jury President: Armando Castagna
- only 12 heats (rain)

Placing	Rider	Total	1	2	3	4	5	6	7	8	9	10	11	12	13	14	15	16	17	18	19	20	Pts	Pos
1	(Latvia) (10) Maksims Bogdanovs	9			3			3						3									9	1
2	(Denmark) (16) Patrick Hougaard	8				3				3	2												8	2
3	(Croatia) (3) Jurica Pavlic	6	3						3				0										6	3
4	(Russia) (1) Artem Laguta	6	2				3				1												6	4
5	(Russia) (8) Vadim Tarasenko	6		3						2			1										6	5
6	(Poland) (14) Maciej Janowski	6				1		2					3										6	6
7	(Slovenia) (9) Martin Vaculík	5			1		2						2										5	7
8	(Australia) (15) Darcy Ward	5				2			2			1											5	8
9	(Denmark) (11) René Bach	4			0				1		3												4	9
10	(Poland) (12) Patryk Dudek	4			2					R		2											4	10
11	(Germany) (2) Kevin Wölbert	3	R					R				3											3	11
12	(Czech Republic) (13) Matěj Kůs	3				0	1							2									3	12
13	(Sweden) (5) Dennis Andersson	2		2			0					0											2	13
14	(Poland) (4) Artur Mroczka^{WC}	2	1							1				0									2	14
15	(Germany) (6) Frank Facher	2		1				1			0												2	15
16	(Poland) (7) Damian Sperz^{WC}	1		R					R					1									1	16
	(Poland) (17) Marcel Szymko^{TR}	0																					0	
	(Poland) (18) Szymon Woźniak^{TR}	0																					0	
Placing	Rider	Total	1	2	3	4	5	6	7	8	9	10	11	12	13	14	15	16	17	18	19	20	Pts	Pos

m - exclusion for exceeding two minute time allowance • t - exclusion for touching the tapes • x - other exclusion • e - retired or mechanical failure • f - fell • ns - non-starter • nc - non-classify

gate A - inside	gate B	gate C	gate D - outside

=== Final Two ===
- 14 August 2010
- (Latvia) Stadium Lokomotive, Daugavpils
- Referee: Mick Bates / Jury President: Andrzej Grodzki
- References

Placing	Rider	Total	1	2	3	4	5	6	7	8	9	10	11	12	13	14	15	16	17	18	19	20	Pts	Pos	21	22
1	(Australia) (7) Darcy Ward	12		3					3					3	3					0			12	1		3
2	(Latvia) (3) Maksims Bogdanovs	12	3						2				3				1				3		12	2		2
3	(Russia) (10) Artem Laguta	11			1			2						2			3		3				11	4	3	
4	(Denmark) (5) Patrick Hougaard	11		2			3					3					0					3	11	3	2	
5	(Poland) (9) Maciej Janowski	10			3		1						1					2		3			10	5		
6	(Denmark) (2) René Bach	10	1					3				2				2				2			10	6		
7	(Sweden) (16) Dennis Andersson	9				1				2	3						2			1			9	7		
8	(Slovakia) (1) Martin Vaculík	9	2				2				2				1				2				9	8		
9	(Croatia) (14) Jurica Pavlic	8				2		1					2		2							1	8	9		
10	(Czech Republic) (11) Matěj Kůs	6			2				1		0					1						2	6	10		
11	(Germany) (6) Kevin Wölbert	5		0				R			1							3			1		5	11		
12	(Russia) (8) Vadim Tarasenko	5		1						3			Fx			Fx			1				5	12		
13	(Poland) (13) Patryk Dudek	3				0	R4							0		3					0		3	13		
14	(Poland) (15) Przemysław Pawlicki^{WC}	3				3			X			X						-	-				3	14		
15	(Latvia) (12) Vjačeslavs Giruckis^{WC}	3			0					1		X			0						2		3	15		
16	(Germany) (4) Frank Facher	1	0							0				1				R				0	1	16		
17	(Latvia) (17) Jevgēņijs Karavackis^{TR}	1																1	Fx				1	17		
	(Latvia) (18) Igors Antonenko^{TR}	0																					0			
Placing	Rider	Total	1	2	3	4	5	6	7	8	9	10	11	12	13	14	15	16	17	18	19	20	Pts	Pos	21	22

m - exclusion for exceeding two minute time allowance • t - exclusion for touching the tapes • x - other exclusion • e - retired or mechanical failure • f - fell • ns - non-starter • nc - non-classify

gate A - inside	gate B	gate C	gate D - outside

=== Final Three ===
- 2 October 2010
- (Czech Republic) Svítkov Stadium, Pardubice
- Referee: Wojciech Grodzki / Jury President: Armando Castagna
- References

Placing	Rider	Total	1	2	3	4	5	6	7	8	9	10	11	12	13	14	15	16	17	18	19	20	Pts	Pos
1	(Poland) (13) Maciej Janowski	14				3	3							2		3					3		14	1
2	(Australia) (11) Darcy Ward	13			3				3		2					2						3	13	2
3	(Slovakia) (7) Martin Vaculík	12		3					2					3	1					3			12	3
4	(Germany) (8) Kevin Wölbert	10		0						3			3			1			3				10	4
5	(Croatia) (15) Jurica Pavlic	10				2			0			3						3	2				10	5
6	(Sweden) (3) Dennis Andersson	10	3						1				1				3				2		10	6
7	(Latvia) (6) Maksims Bogdanovs	9		2				2			3							1			1		9	7
8	(Poland) (10) Patryk Dudek	8			2			3						1			2		0				8	8
9	(Denmark) (9) Patrick Hougaard	8			0		2						2					2		2			8	9
10	(Denmark) (1) René Bach	6	1				R				1				3				1				6	10
11	(Czech Republic) (4) Matěj Kůs	5	2							1				0				0				2	5	11
12	(Russia) (14) Vadim Tarasenko	5				1		1					R4		2							1	5	12
13	(Germany) (16) Frank Facher	4				0				2	0						1			1			4	13
14	(Czech Republic) (5) Václav Milík, Jr.^{WC}	4		1			1					2					0					0	4	14
15	(Czech Republic) (2) Jan Holub III^{WC}	1	0					0				1				0				M/-			1	15
16	(Russia) (12) Artem Laguta	1			1					F		-			-						-		1	16
17	(Czech Republic) (17) Roman Čejka^{TR}	0										0								0			0	17
18	(Czech Republic) (18) René Vidner^{TR}	0													0						0		0	18
Placing	Rider	Total	1	2	3	4	5	6	7	8	9	10	11	12	13	14	15	16	17	18	19	20	Pts	Pos

m - exclusion for exceeding two minute time allowance • t - exclusion for touching the tapes • x - other exclusion • e - retired or mechanical failure • f - fell • ns - non-starter • nc - non-classify

gate A - inside	gate B	gate C	gate D - outside

=== Medals run-off ===
Because after the last heat was a tie between top three riders, a run-off was decided about all medals.

Gate	Rider	Place
A	(Australia) Darcy Ward	1st
B	(Poland) Maciej Janowski	2nd
C	(Latvia) Maksims Bogdanovs	3rd

== Classification ==
The meeting classification will be according to the points scored during the meeting (heats 1–20). The total points scored by each rider during each final meeting (heat 1–20) will be credited also as World Championship points. The FIM Speedway Under 21 World Champion will be the rider having collected most World Championship points at the end of the series. In case of a tie between one or more riders in the final overall classification, a run-off will decide the 1st, 2nd and 3rd place. For all other placings, the better-placed rider in the last final meeting will be the better placed rider.

Pos.	Rider	Points	(Poland)	(Latvia)	(Czech Republic)
Gold	(Australia) Darcy Ward	30 (+3)	5	12	13
Silver	(Poland) Maciej Janowski	30 (+2)	6	10	14
Bronze	(Latvia) Maksims Bogdanovs	30 (+1)	9	12	9
4	(Denmark) Patrick Hougaard	27	8	11	8
5	(Slovakia) Martin Vaculík	26	5	9	12
6	(Croatia) Jurica Pavlic	24	6	8	10
7	(Sweden) Dennis Andersson	21	2	9	10
8	(Denmark) René Bach	20	4	10	6
9	(Germany) Kevin Wölbert	18	3	5	10
10	(Russia) Artem Laguta	18	6	11	1
11	(Russia) Vadim Tarasenko	16	6	5	5
12	(Poland) Patryk Dudek	15	4	3	8
13	(Czech Republic) Matěj Kůs	14	3	6	5
14	(Germany) Frank Facher	7	2	1	4
15	(Czech Republic) Václav Milík, Jr.	4	–	–	4
16	(Poland) Przemysław Pawlicki	3	–	3	–
17	(Latvia) Vjačeslavs Giruckis	3	–	3	–
18	(Poland) Artur Mroczka	2	2	–	–
19	(Czech Republic) Jan Holub III	1	–	–	1
20	(Latvia) Jevgēņijs Karavackis	1	–	1	–
21	(Poland) Damian Sperz	1	1	–	–
22	(Czech Republic) Roman Čejka	0	–	–	0
23	(Czech Republic) René Vidner	0	–	–	0
Rider(s) not classified
	(Poland) Marcel Szymko	—	ns	–	–
	(Poland) Szymon Woźniak	—	ns	–	–
	(Latvia) Igors Antonenko	—	–	ns	–

== See also ==
- 2010 Speedway Grand Prix
- 2010 Team Speedway Junior World Championship
