= Germany national under-19 speedway team =

Germany
- Association: German Motor Union; Deutscher Motor Sport Bund
- FIM code: DMSB
- Team manager: Rene Schäfer
- Nation colour: Black, Red and Yellow

European Championships
| Team U-19 | — | 1 | — |
- Best result: 2nd (2008)
| Individual U-19 | — | — | — |
- Best result: 4th - Martin Smolinski (2000)

The Germany national under-19 speedway team is the national under-19 motorcycle speedway team of Germany and is controlled by the Deutscher Motor Sport Bund. The team was started in all editions of Team Speedway Junior European Championship and they won one silver medal. The German riders has never won a medal in Individual competition.

== Competition ==
Team Speedway Junior European Championship
| Year | Place | Pts. | Riders |
|---|---|---|---|
| 2008 | 2 | 29 | Kevin Wölbert (12), Frank Facher (8), Erik Pudel (7), Max Dilger (2), Sönke Petersen (0) |
| 2009 | — | — | 3rd place in Semi-Final; Erik Pudel (17), René Deddens (11), Marcel Helfer (4), Sebastian Eckerle (1), Franz Winklhofer (0) |
| 2010 | — | — | 3rd place in Semi-Final; René Deddens (5), Marcel Helfer (2), Michel Hofmann (2), Kai Huckenbeck (1), Danny Maassen (1) |

== Riders ==
Riders who started in Individual Speedway Junior European Championship Finals:

- Stefan Katt (1998 - 14th)
- Martin Smolinski (2000 - 4th, 2002 - 13th, 2003 - 16th)
- Matthias Schultz (2001 - 9th, 2003 - 9th)
- Hans Jorg Muller (2001 - 11th)
- Christian Hefenbrock (2004 - 8th)
- Alexander Lischke (2004 - 17th)
- Kevin Wölbert (2005 - 8th, 2006 - 10th, 2007 - 8th, 2008 - 6th)
- Tobias Busch (2007 - 11th)
- René Deddens (2009 - 17th)

== See also ==
- Germany national speedway team
- Germany national under-21 speedway team
