= Simon Gustafsson =

Swedish speedway rider (born 1990)

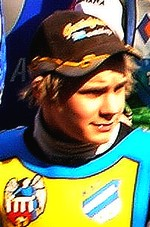
- Born: 26 May 1990 (age 36); Sköllersta, Sweden
- Nationality: Swedish

Career history

Sweden
- 2007–2013: Indianerna
- 2014: Piraterna

Denmark
- 2007: Grindsted

Poland
- 2007: Rawicz
- 2009, 2012: Łódź
- 2010: Gorzów
- 2011: Start Gniezno
- 2013–2014: Daugavpils

Great Britain
- 2008–2013: Eastbourne Eagles
- 2014: Swindon Robins

Individual honours
- 2011: Swedish U21 champion

Team honours
- 2008 2008: U-19 European Champion; Elite League KO Cup winner Elite League Shield 2009

Simon Anders Gustafsson (born 26 May 1990 in Sköllersta, Sweden) is a former motorcycle speedway rider from Sweden.

== Career ==
Gustafsson won the Team U-19 European Champion title in 2008.

Gustafsson rode in the British leagues for Eastbourne Eagles from 2008 to 2013 and then Swindon Robins in 2014.

== Family ==
Gustafsson is the son of former Grand Prix rider Henrik Gustafsson.

== Results ==
=== World Championships ===
- Individual U-21 World Championship
  - 2007 - (Poland) Ostrów Wlkp. - 12th place (5 pts)
  - 2008 - (Czech Republic) Pardubice - 17th place (0 pts in one heat)
  - 2009 - (Croatia) Goričan - 8th place (7 pts)
- Team U-21 World Championship (Under 21 Speedway World Cup)
  - 2007 - 3rd place in Qualifying Round 1
  - 2008 - (Denmark) Holsted - 3rd place (8 pts)
  - 2009 - (Poland) Gorzów Wlkp. - 3rd place (6 pts)

=== European Championships ===
- Team U-19 European Championship
  - 2008 - (Poland) Rawicz - European Champion (9 pts)
  - 2009 - (Denmark) Holsted - Runner-up (12 pts)

=== Domestic competitions ===
- Swedish Individual Speedway Championship
  - 2007 - 12th place
- Swedish Junior Speedway Championship
  - 2007 - 4th place

== See also ==
- Sweden national speedway team (U21, U19)
