= 2007 Speedway Under-21 World Championship =

Annual world under-21 motorcycle speedway event

World Under-21 Championship
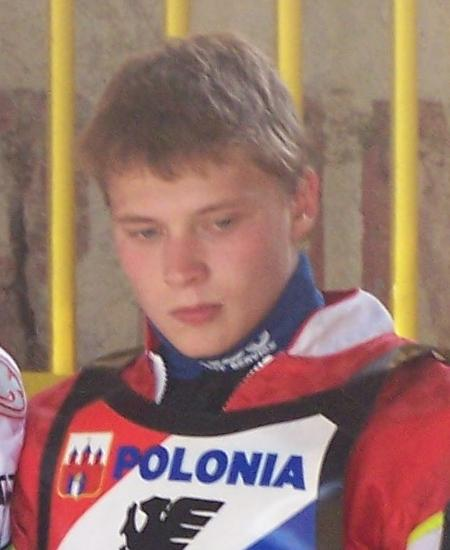
- Emil Saifutdinov
- Start date: 22 April 2007
- End date: 9 September 2007

The 2007 Individual Speedway Junior World Championship was the 31st edition of the World motorcycle speedway Under-21 Championships.

The title was won by Emil Sajfutdinov of Russia.

== Calendar ==
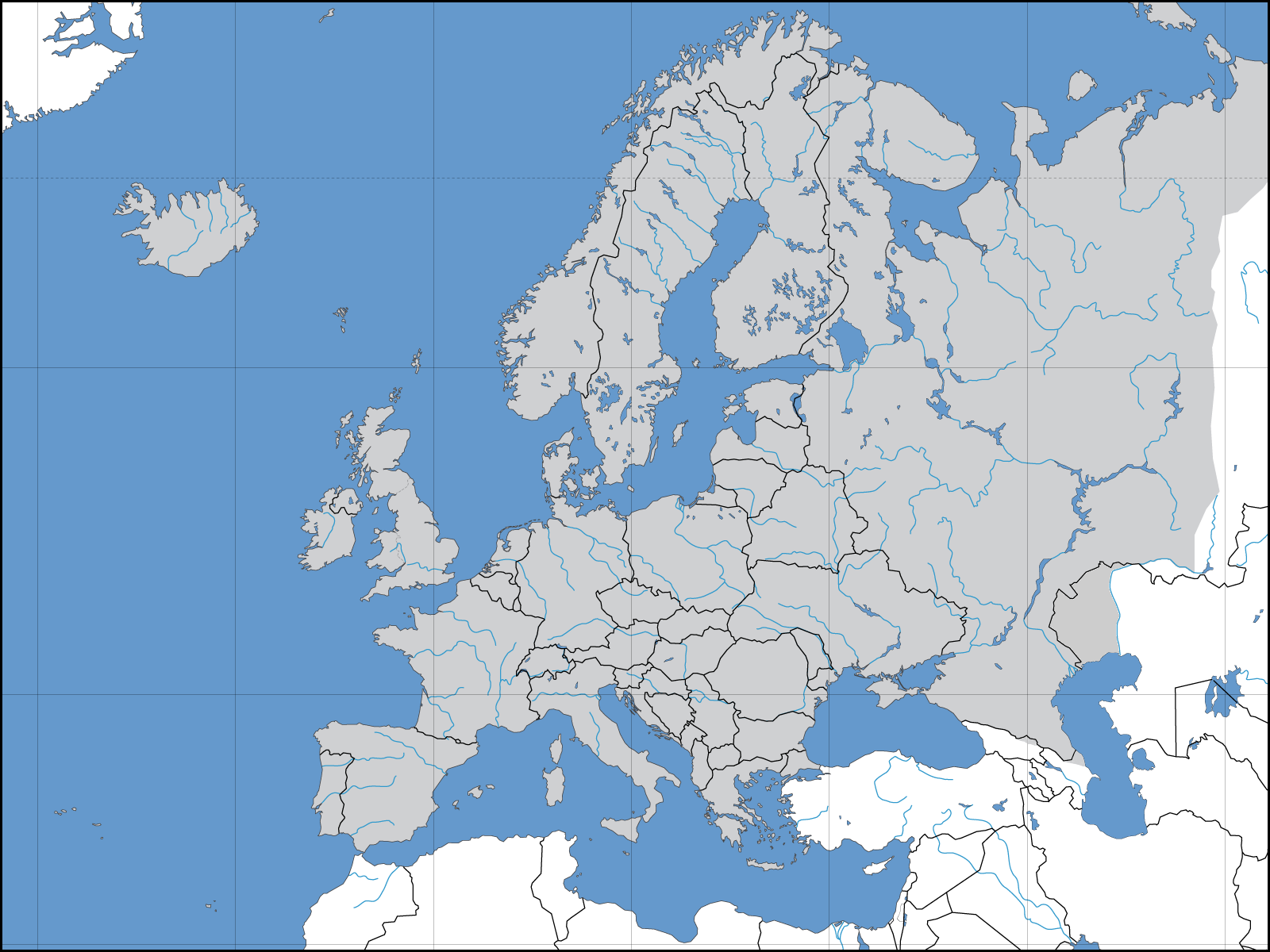

- Quarter-finals - Semi-finals - Final

Day	Venue	Winner	
Quarter-finals
22 April	(Germany) Herxheim	(Australia) Chris Holder	result
12 May	(Sweden) Motala	(Denmark) Morten Risager	result
12 May	(Croatia) Goričan	(Poland) Krzysztof Buczkowski	result
13 May	(England) Hoddesdon	(Russia) Emil Saifutdinov	result
Semi-finals
16 June	(Denmark) Vojens	(Australia) Chris Holder	result
17 June	(Latvia) Daugavpils	(Russia) Emil Saifutdinov	result
Final
9 Sep	(Poland) Ostrów Wlkp.	(Russia) Emil Saifutdinov	result

== Quarter-finals ==
=== Herxheim ===
- Qualifying round 1
- 22 April 2007 (2pm)
- (Germany) Sandbahn Rennen Herxheim, Herxheim
- Referee: Niels M. Nielsen

Pos.	Rider	Points	Heats
1	(Australia) (1) Chris Holder	14	(3,3,2,3,3)
2	(Poland) (2) Paweł Hlib	13	(2,3,3,2,3)
3	(Slovakia) (14) Martin Vaculík	12+3	(3,2,3,1,3)
4	(Austria) (13) Fritz Wallner	12+2	(1,2,3,3,3)
5	(Poland) (10) Adrian Gomólski	11	(3,1,2,3,2)
6	(Czech Republic) (6) Matěj Kůs	10	(3,0,3,2,2)
7	(Germany) (9) Frank Facher	8	(2,0,2,3,1)
8	(Germany) (16) Richard Speiser	7	(2,0,1,2,2)
9	(Czech Republic) (12) Hynek Štichauer	6	(1,3,2,0,F)
10	(Netherlands) (3) Mark Stiekema	6	(1,3,0,1,1)
11	(Austria) (7) Manuel Novotny	6	(2,2,0,2,0)
12	(Netherlands) (8) Jannick de Jong	6	(1,2,1,1,1)
13	(Hungary) (4) Jozsef Tabaka	4	(0,1,1,1,1)
14	(Germany) (5) Max Dilger	3	(X,1,E,E,2)
15	(Hungary) (11) Attila Lörincz	1	(E,1,0,0,0)
16	(Slovenia) (15) Matic Voldrih	1	(0,0,1,E,0)
-	(Germany) (17) Stefan Kurz	-	
-	(Germany) (18) Christoph Demmel	-	

=== Motala ===
- Qualifying round 2
- 12 May 2007 (5pm)
- (Sweden) Motala Arena, Motala
- Referee:Frank Ziegler

Pos.	Rider	Points	Heats
1	(Denmark) (15) Morten Risager	13+3	(3,3,3,2,2)
2	(Denmark) (2) Nicolai Klindt	13+2	(3,3,2,3,2)
3	(Sweden) (16) Simon Gustafsson	13+1	(2,3,2,3,3)
4	(Sweden) (1) Ricky Kling	11	(2,0,3,3,3)
5	(Sweden) (9) Thomas H. Jonasson	11	(2,3,3,3,F)
6	(Denmark) (5) Patrick Hougaard	10	(3,2,0,2,3)
7	(Sweden) (13) Billy Forsberg	10	(1,1,3,2,3)
8	(Denmark) (10) Kenneth Hansen	9	(3,2,2,1,1)
9	(Denmark) (12) Dannie Soderholm	7	(1,2,1,2,1)
10	(Sweden) (3) Viktor Bergström	6	(1,1,2,0,2)
11	(Norway) (4) Carl Johan Raugstad	5	(0,1,1,1,2)
12	(Sweden) (7) Robin Törnqvist	4	(2,2,F,-,-)
13	(Denmark) (6) Klaus Jakobsen	2	(1,0,1,0,0)
14	(Finland) (8) Joni Keskinen	2	(0,0,1,1,0)
15	(Finland) (14) Teemu Lahti	1	(0,1,0,0,0)
16	(Finland) (11) Jari Makinen	1	(E,0,0,0,1)
17	(Sweden) (17) Andreas Messing	1	(1)
18	(Sweden) (18) Linus Eklöf	1	(1)

=== Goričan ===
- Qualifying round 3
- 12 May 2007 (5pm)
- (Croatia) Stadium Milenium, Goričan
- Referee: Mick Bates

Pos.	Rider	Points	Heats
1	(Poland) (2) Krzysztof Buczkowski	14	(3,3,3,2,3)
2	(Croatia) (9) Jurica Pavlič	13	(2,3,3,3,2)
3	(Latvia) (13) Maksims Bogdanovs	12	(3,2,1,3,3)
4	(Czech Republic) (11) Luboš Tomíček, Jr.	10	(3,3,T/-,1,3)
5	(Poland) (7) Marcin Jędrzejewski	10	(2,2,3,2,1)
6	(Czech Republic) (3) Filip Šitera	10	(2,1,2,3,2)
7	(United Kingdom) (5) Ben Barker	9	(3,1,1,2,2)
8	(Ukraine) (12) Andriej Karpow	8+3	(0,3,2,3,E)
9	(United Kingdom) (10) Daniel King	8+2	(1,2,2,X,3)
10	(Croatia) (6) Nikola Martinec	8+1	(1,1,3,2,1)
11	(Russia) (15) Igor Kononov	4	(2,0,0,X,2)
12	(Slovenia) (1) Davor Volk	4	(1,0,2,0,1)
13	(Italy) (14) Andrea Baroni	3	(X,0,1,1,1)
14	(Slovenia) (8) Matija Duh	2	(0,2,0,0,0)
15	(Croatia) (17) Renato Cvetko	2	(1,0,1)
16	(Latvia) (4) Vjačeslavs Giruckis	1	(0,E,0,1,0)
17	(Croatia) (18) Nikola Pigac	1	(1,0)
18	(Ukraine) (16) Jaroslaw Poljuchowicz	1	(1,-,-,-,-)

=== Hoddesdon ===
- Qualifying round 4
- 12 May 2007
- (England) Rye House Stadium, Hoddesdon
- Referee: Brian Svendsen

Pos.	Rider	Points	Heats
1	(Russia) (1) Emil Saifutdinov	13	(2,3,3,3,2)
2	(United Kingdom) (16) Lewis Bridger	12+3	(3,2,2,2,3)
3	(Russia) (10) Daniil Ivanov	12+2	(3,3,2,1,3)
4	(Australia) (5) Troy Batchelor	11	(2,T/-,3,3,3)
5	(United Kingdom) (4) Tai Woffinden	11	(3,3,1,2,2)
6	(United Kingdom) (7) William Lawson	10	(3,3,E,2,2)
7	(Australia) (11) Robert Ksiezak	9	(2,2,1,3,1)
8	(New Zealand) (13) Andrew Bargh	8	(F,0,3,2,3)
9	(Poland) (15) Kamil Brzozowski	7	(1,0,2,3,1)
10	(United States) (6) Kenny Ingalls	5	(1,2,0,0,2)
11	(Poland) (3) Maciej Piaszczyński	4	(E,1,3,0,0)
12	(United States) (2) Dale Facchini	4	(1,1,1,X,1)
13	(France) (14) Jeremy Diraison	3	(2,0,1,0,0)
14	(France) (9) Mathieu Trésarrieu	3	(F,2,X,1,F)
15	(Germany) (12) Stefan Kurz	3	(1,F,0,1,1)
16	(United Kingdom) (18) Steve Boxall	2	(2)
17	(Germany) (8) Ramon Stanek	2	(E,1,X,1,0)
18	(United Kingdom) (17) Adam Roynon	1	(1)

== Semi-finals ==
=== Vojens ===
- Semi-final 1
- 16 June 2007
- (Denmark) Vojens Speedway Center, Vojens
- Referee: Mick Bates
- No16: Troy Batchelor → (17) Kenneth Hansen

Pos.	Rider	Points	Heats
1	(Australia) (14) Chris Holder	14	(3,2,3,3,3)
2	(United Kingdom) (6) Edward Kennett	13	(3,1,3,3,3)
3	(Denmark) (9) Morten Risager	12	(2,3,2,2,3)
4	(Croatia) (11) Jurica Pavlič	10	(F,3,2,3,2)
5	(United Kingdom) (2) Lewis Bridger	10	(3,3,2,2,0)
6	(Sweden) (12) Simon Gustafsson	9	(1,3,3,0,2)
7	(Germany) (10) Kevin Wölbert	8	(3,0,F,3,2)
8	(Czech Republic) (7) Filip Šitera	7+3	(2,1,2,1,1)
9	(Poland) (1) Adrian Gomólski	7+X/F	(X,1,1,2,3)
10	(Sweden) (13) Billy Forsberg	6	(X,2,3,1,0)
11	(Denmark) (16) Kenneth Hansen	6	(X,2,F,2,2)
12	(United Kingdom) (4) William Lawson	6	(2,1,1,1,1)
13	(Germany) (17) Richard Speiser	5	(1,2,0,1,1)
14	(Germany) (8) Frank Facher	2	(1,0,1,0,0)
15	(Austria) (5) Fritz Wallner	1	(E,E,1,E,N)
16	(Czech Republic) (15) Matěj Kůs	1	(X,0,0,0,1)
17	(Denmark) (3) Nicolai Klindt	0	(F/-,-,-,-,-)

=== Daugavpils ===
- Semi-final 2
- 17 June 2007
- (Latvia) Stadium Lokomotīve, Daugavpils
- Referee: Thierry Bouin
- No5: Tai Woffinden → (18) Andrew Bargh
- NoR2: Andrew Bargh → Hynek Štichauer

Pos.	Rider	Points	Heats
1	(Russia) (3) Emil Saifutdinov	15	(3,3,3,3,3)
2	(Latvia) (15) Kasts Poudzuks	12	(3,2,3,3,1)
3	(Poland) (7) Paweł Hlib	11	(3,0,3,3,2)
4	(Poland) (10) Karol Ząbik	10	(3,3,X,2,2)
5	(Sweden) (9) Ricky Kling	10	(1,3,2,1,3)
6	(Sweden) (1) Thomas H. Jonasson	10	(2,2,1,2,3)
7	(Czech Republic) (13) Luboš Tomíček, Jr.	10	(2,1,2,3,2)
8	(Russia) (16) Daniil Ivanov	8+3	(1,3,3,1,0)
9	(Australia) (12) Robert Ksiezak	8+2	(2,2,2,1,1)
10	(Denmark) (11) Patrick Hougaard	6	(0,1,2,E,3)
11	(Latvia) (2) Maksims Bogdanovs	5	(0,1,1,2,1)
12	(Slovakia) (6) Martin Vaculík	4	(0,2,0,2,0)
13	(Poland) (4) Marcin Jędrzejewski	4	(1,1,1,0,1)
14	(United Kingdom) (8) Ben Barker	3	(2,0,0,1,0)
15	(Czech Republic) (18) Hynek Štichauer	2	(2)
16	(New Zealand) (5) Andrew Bargh	1	(1,0,0,0,0)
17	(Poland) (14) Krzysztof Buczkowski	1	(F,X,1,-,-)
18	(Ukraine) (17) Andriej Karpow	0	(X)

== Final ==
2007 Final logo

- 9 September 2007 (Sunday, 7pm local time)
- (Poland) Municipal Stadium, Ostrów Wielkopolski
- Referee: Mick Bates
- Jury President:Miloslav Verner
- Attendance: 14,000
- Best Time: 64,18 s (New Track Record) (Russia) Emil Saifutdinov (9 heat)

Placing	Rider	Total	1	2	3	4	5	6	7	8	9	10	11	12	13	14	15	16	17	18	19	20	Pts	Pos
1	(Russia) (6) Emil Saifutdinov	15		3				3			3							3			3		15	1
2	(Australia) (8) Chris Holder	14		2						3			3			3			3				14	2
3	(Poland) (15) Paweł Hlib	12				3			2			3						2	2				12	3
4	(Croatia) (10) Jurica Pavlič	10			3			0						3			3		1				10	4
5	(Poland) (11) Karol Ząbik	10			2				3		2					1						2	10	5
6	(Sweden) (14) Thomas H. Jonasson	10				2		2					2		3							1	10	6
7	(Russia) (2) Daniil Ivanov	8	3					1				1				0				3			8	7
8	(Denmark) (1) Morten Risager	8	2				3				1				2				0				8	8
9	(Czech Republic) (13) Filip Šitera	8				0	2							2		2					2		8	9
10	(United Kingdom) (12) Lewis Bridger	6			1					2		2			E						1		6	10
11	(United Kingdom) (4) Edward Kennett	5	0							1				1				E				3	5	11
12	(Sweden) (16) Simon Gustafsson	5				1				0	0						2			2			5	12
13	(Latvia) (5) Kasts Poudzuks	3		1			1					0					1					0	3	13
14	(Sweden) (3) Ricky Kling	3	1						1				1				X				E		3	14
15	(Czech Republic) (9) Luboš Tomíček, Jr.	2			0		0						0					1		1			2	15
16	(Germany) (7) Kevin Wölbert	1		0					0					0	1					0			1	16
17	(Australia) (17) Robert Ksiezak	0																					0	17
18	(Poland) (18) Adrian Gomólski	0																					0	18
Placing	Rider	Total	1	2	3	4	5	6	7	8	9	10	11	12	13	14	15	16	17	18	19	20	Pts	Pos

m - exclusion for exceeding two minute time allowance • t - exclusion for touching the tapes • x - other exclusion • e - retired or mechanical failure • f - fell • ns - non-starter • nc - non-classify

gate A - inside	gate B	gate C	gate D - outside

=== Heat after heat ===
1. (65,00) Ivanov, Risager, Kling, Kennett
2. (64,78) Saifutdinov, Holder, Puodzuks, Woelbert
3. (65,35) Pavlič, Ząbik, Bridger, Tomíček
4. (65,15) Hlib, Jonasson, Gutafsson, Šitera
5. (65,56) Risager, Šitera, Puodzuks, Tomíček
6. (64,28) Saifutdinov, Jonasson, Ivanov, Pavlič
7. (64,78) Ząbik, Hlib, Kling, Woelbert
8. (64,44) Holder, Bridger, Kennett, Gustafsson
9. (64,18) Saifutdinov, Ząbik, Risager, Gustafsson
10. (66,19) Hlib, Bridger, Ivanov, Puodzuks
11. (65,19) Holder, Jonasson, Kling, Tomíček
12. (65,47) Pavlič, Šitera, Kennett, Woelbert
13. (65,33) Jonasson, Risager, Woelbert, Bridger (2e)
14. (65,81) Holder, Šitera, Ząbik, Ivanov
15. (66,28) Pavlič, Gustafsson, Puodzuks, Kling (X)
  Kling won, but after heat Referee exclusion him. Kling foul of Pavlic.
16. (65,85) Saifutdinov, Hlib, Tomíček, Kennett
17. (65,11) Holder, Hlib, Pavlič, Risager
18. (65,84) Ivanov, Gustafsson, Tomíček, Woelbert
19. (64,99) Saifutdinov, Šitera, Bridger, Kling (4e)
20. (66,11) Kennett, Ząbik, Jonasson, Puodzuks

2e - mechanical failure on 2nd place

Final standing:

1. (gold) Emil Saifutdinov (Russia)
2. (silver) Chris Holder (Australia)
3. (bronze) Paweł Hlib (Poland)
