= Frank Facher =

German speedway rider

- Born: 11 June 1989 (age 37); Olching, Germany
- Nationality: German

Career history

Germany
- 2003–2008: Olching
- 2009–2010: Diedenbergen
- 2011: Landshut

Poland
- 2009: Ostrów
- 2010–2011: Poznań

Great Britain
- 2009: Berwick Bandits
- 2010: Stoke Potters

Frank Facher (born 11 June 1989) is a former speedway rider from Germany. He earned two international caps for the German national speedway team.

== Career ==
Facher won the German Junior Vhampionship in 2009 and started riding in the Polish leagues for the first time during the 2009 Polish speedway season, riding for TZ Ostrovia Ostrów Wielkopolski. The following season, he moved to PSŻ Poznań to compete in the Team Speedway Polish Championship during the 2010 Polish speedway season.

Facher began riding in Britain during the 2009 Premier League speedway season, appearing for Berwick Bandits six times. He signed on Friday 30 July 2010 for the Stoke Potters of the British Premier League on a full contract to replace the injured Hynek Stichauer.

== Results ==
=== World Championships ===
- Individual U-21 World Championship
  - 2007 - 14th placed in the Semi-Final One
  - 2008 - 10th placed in Qualifying Round Two
  - 2009 - 9th placed in Qualifying Round Two
  - 2010 - qualify to the Semi-Final Two
- Team U-21 World Championship
  - 2006 - 4th placed in the Qualifying Round One for Germany II
  - 2007 - 4th place (0 pts)
  - 2008 - 3rd place in the Qualifying Round Two
  - 2009 - 2nd place in the Qualifying Round One
  - 2010 - 3rd place in the Qualifying Round Two

=== European Championships ===
- Individual European Championship
  - 2008 - qualify to the Semi-Final One, but was replaced
- Individual U-19 European Championship
  - 2008 - 7th placed in the Semi-Final Three
  - 2009 - 9th placed in the Semi-Final One
- Team U-19 European Championship
  - 2008 - Runner-up (8 pts)

== See also ==
- Germany national speedway team (U21, U19)
