= 2009 Team Speedway Junior European Championship =

Motorcycle racing competition

Seasons
- ← 2008 2010 →

The 2009 Team Speedway Junior European Championship was the 2nd UEM Team Speedway Junior European Championship season. The Final was held on August 23, 2009 in Holsted, Denmark. The championship was won by Poland (40 points), who they beat defending champion Sweden (38 points), host team Denmark (26 points) and Czech Republic (15 points).

== Results ==
The Final had the defending Champions Sweden, host team Denmark (3rd place in 2008 Final) and Poland (4th place). A last finalist was determined in one Semi-Final. In Bockhorn, Germany on 18 July was Ukraine, Czech Republic, Russia and host team Germany (2nd place). The Russian team withdrew and was replaced by Finland.

- Semi-Final
- (Germany) Bockhorn
- 18 July 2009

Pos.	National team	Pts.
1	Czech Republic	43
2	Finland	36
3	Germany	33
4	Ukraine	7

- The Final
- (Denmark) Holsted
- 23 August 2009

Pos.	National team	Pts.
1	Poland	40
2	Sweden	38
3	Denmark	26
4	Czech Republic	15

== Heat details ==
=== Semi-final ===
- 18 July 2009 (20:00 UTC+2)
- GER Moorwinkelsdamm, Bockhorn, Lower Saxony (Speedwaystadion Moorwinkelsdamm - Length: 360 m)
- Referee and Jury President: (Sweden) Krister Gardell
- Qualify: 1 to the Final

Placing	Team / Rider name	Total	1	2	3	4	5	6	7	8	9	10	11	12	13	14	15	16	Pts	17	18	19	20
1	Czech Republic	43	2	3	5	8	10	13	14	16	18	19	22	25	27	29	30	32		35	38	41	43
1	(1) Michael Hádek	12				3				2				3				2	10				2
1	(2) Pavel Pucko	10			2				1				3				1		7	3
1	(3) Michal Dudek	10		1				3				1			2				7		3
1	(4) Jan Holub III	11	2				2				2					2			8			3
1	(17) Václav Milík, Jr.	0																	0
2	Finland	36	3	6	9	11	14	15	17	18	18	20	22	24	27	28	30	31		33	35	36	36
2	(9) Kalle Katajisto	10			3		3					2						1	9			1
2	(10) Niko Siltaniemi	7				2		1			-						2		5	2
2	(11) Jari Makinen	9		3						1			2			1			7		2
2	(12) Timo Lahti	10	3						2					2	3				10				F
2	(19) Aki-Pekka Mustonen	0									0								0
3	Germany	33	1	3	3	4	5	7	10	13	16	19	19	20	20	23	26	29		29	30	30	33
3	(13) Erik Pudel	17		2					3		3					3		3	14				3
3	(14) René Deddens	11	1				1			3		3					3		11			E
3	(15) Marcel Helfer	4			0			2						1		-			3		1
3	(16) Sebastian Eckerle	1				1	-						F		-				1	0
3	(20) Franz Winklhofer	0													0				0
4	Ukraine	7	0	0	1	1	1	1	1	1	2	2	3	3	4	4	4	4		5	5	7	7
4	(5) Andriy Kobrin	3	0					0					1					0	1			2
4	(6) Stanislav Ohorodnyk	0		0			0							0			0		0		0
4	(7) Serhiy Borisenko	0				F			0			0				0			0	-
4	(8) Volodymyr Teigal	4			1					0	1				1				3	1			F
Placing	Team / Rider name	Total	1	2	3	4	5	6	7	8	9	10	11	12	13	14	15	16	Pts	17	18	19	20

M - exclusion for exceeding two-minute time allowance • T - exclusion for touching the tapes • X - other exclusion • E - retired or mechanical failure • F - fell

Helmet colours were permanent for each team (Red, Blue, White and Yellow/Black). Colours in diagrams indicate gate positions:
gate A – inside	gate B	gate C	gate D – outside

=== The Final ===
- 23 August 2009 (14:30 UTC+2)
- DEN Holsted, Holsted Speedway Center (Length: 300 m)
- Referee: (United Kingdom) M. Bates
- Jury President: (Ukraine) S. Lyatosinskyy

Placing	Team / Rider name	Total	1	2	3	4	5	6	7	8	9	10	11	12	13	14	15	16	Pts	17	18	19	20
1	Poland	40	3	4	7	7	10	11	13	14	15	16	19	19	22	25	28	30		32	35	37	40
1	(9) Maciej Janowski	15			3		3					1			3			2	12				3
1	(10) Sławomir Musielak	1				0		-			1						-		1	-
1	(11) Patryk Dudek	2		1						1			-			-			2		-
1	(12) Dawid Lampart	7	3						2					F	-				5			2
1	(19) Przemysław Pawlicki	15						1					3			3	3		10	2	3
2	Sweden	38	2	4	6	8	10	12	15	18	20	23	24	27	29	30	31	34		35	36	36	38
2	(13) Simon Gustafsson	12		2					3		2							3	10				2
2	(14) Anton Rosén	6	2							-		3					1		6		-
2	(15) Ludvig Lindgren	7			2			2						3		-			7			F
2	(16) Linus Sundström	5				-	2						1		2				5	-
2	(20) Dennis Andersson	8				2				3						1			6	1	1
3	Denmark	26	0	2	2	3	3	6	6	6	9	11	13	15	15	17	19	20		20	22	25	26
3	(5) Michael Jepsen Jensen	10	T					3			3		2					1	9				1
3	(6) René Bach (c)	9		2			F							2			2		6	0		3
3	(7) Simon Nielsen	1				1			0			-				-			1		-
3	(8) Patrick Bjerregaard	0			0					0	-				-				0	-
3	(18) Michael Palm Toft	6										2			0	2			4		2
4	Czech Republic	15	1	1	2	5	6	6	7	9	9	9	9	10	11	11	11	11		14	14	15	15
4	(1) Michael Hádek	9				3				2				1				0	6	3			0
4	(2) Pavel Pucko	2			1				1				T				0		2			-
4	(3) Michal Dudek	0		0				0				-			-				0	-
4	(4) Jan Holub III	2	1				1				0					0			2		0
4	(17) Václav Milík, Jr.	2										0			1				1			1
Placing	Team / Rider name	Total	1	2	3	4	5	6	7	8	9	10	11	12	13	14	15	16	Pts	17	18	19	20

M - exclusion for exceeding two-minute time allowance • T - exclusion for touching the tapes • X - other exclusion • E - retired or mechanical failure • F - fell

Helmet colours were permanent for each team (Red, Blue, White and Yellow/Black). Colours in diagrams indicate gate positions:
gate A – inside	gate B	gate C	gate D – outside

== See also ==
- 2009 Team Speedway Junior World Championship
- 2009 Individual Speedway Junior European Championship
