= Finland national under-19 speedway team =

Youth motorcycle speedway team representing Finland

Finland
- Association: Finnish Motorcycling Federation; Suomen Moottoriliitto r.y.
- FIM code: SML
- Team manager: Jyri Palomäki
- Nation colour: Red and White

European Championships
Team U-19	—	—	—
- Best result: never qualify to the final
Individual U-19	—	—	—
- Best result: never won a medal

The Finland national under-19 speedway team is the national under-19 motorcycle speedway team of Finland and is controlled by the Finnish Motorcycling Federation. The team was started in Team U-19 European Championship one time, but they do not qualify to the final. Finnish riders never won a medal in Individual U-19 European Championship.

== Competition ==
Team Speedway Junior European Championship
Year	Place	Pts.	Riders
2008			Did not enter
2009	—	—	2nd place in Semi Final; Kalle Katajisto (10), Timo Lahti (10), Jari Makinen (9), Niko Siltaniemi (7), Aki-Pekka Mustonen (0)

== See also ==
- Finland national speedway team
- Finland national under-21 speedway team
