= Simon Nielsen (speedway rider) =

Danish speedway rider

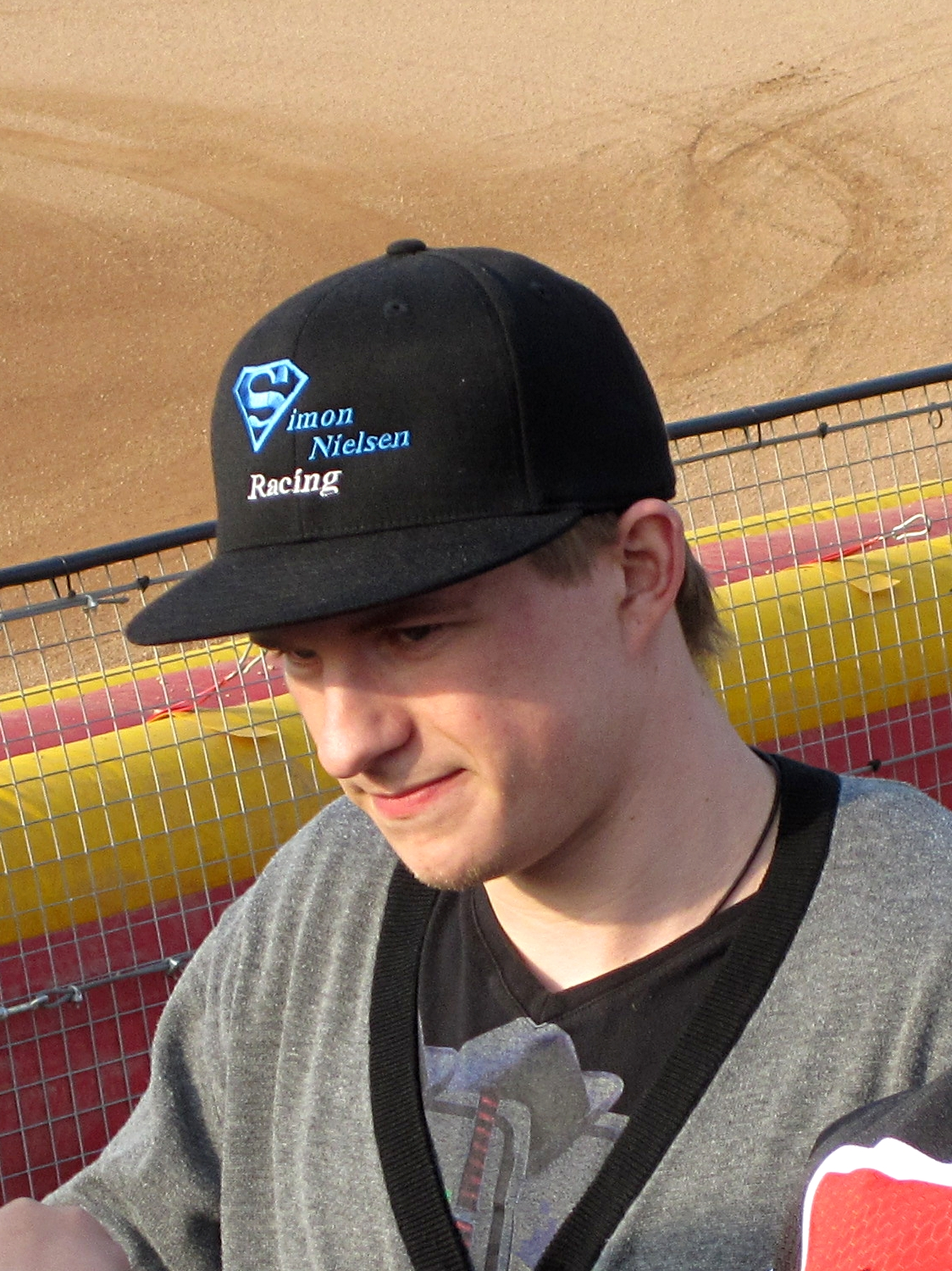
- Born: 1 October 1990 (age 35); Stenlille, Denmark
- Nationality: Danish

Career history

Denmark
- 2008–2009, 2013: Holsted
- 2010–2011: Fjelsted
- 2012, 2015: Esbjerg
- 2016: Holstebro

Great Britain
- 2011: Workington
- 2012, 2013: Leicester
- 2013: Plymouth
- 2014: Sheffield
- 2014–2015: Newcastle
- 2016: Redcar Bears

Poland
- 2008-2009: Gniezno
- 20011: Wrocław

Simon Nielsen (born 1 October 1990) is a former motorcycle speedway rider from Denmark.

== Career ==
Born in Stenlille, Nielsen won 2005 Individual Speedway FIM Youth Gold Trophy 80 cc, unofficial U-16 World Championship. He rode in the Denmark U-19 national team.

In 2011, Nielsen came to the UK to try to get a team place and got a place in the Workington Comets team towards the end of the season. In December 2011, he was announced as the final member of the 2012 Leicester Lions team in the British Premier League. After an injury early in the season, he showed good form before suffering a broken femur in a crash with team mate Jari Mäkinen on 23 June.

Nielsen re-signed for Leicester Lions for the 2013 Premier League season. In May 2013, he was dropped by the Lions with his place going to Alex Edberg. In June, he signed for Plymouth Devils. In 2014, he signed for Newcastle Diamonds, staying with the team for 2015 before moving on to Redcar Bears.

== Results ==
=== European Championships ===
- Individual U-19 European Championship
  - 2008 - (Germany) Stralsund - 10th place (7 pts)
  - 2009 - 18th place in Semi-Final 2 (injury)
- Team U-19 European Championship
  - 2008 - (Poland) Rawicz - 3rd place (4 pts)
  - 2009 - (Denmark) Holsted - 3rd place (1 pt)

=== Domestic competitions ===
- Team Polish Championship
  - 2008 - 1st place in Second League (Average 0.750 in 4 heats) for Gniezno
  - 2009 - First League for Gniezno

== See also ==
- Denmark national speedway team
