= 2008 Team Speedway Junior European Championship =

Annual European Junior motorcycle speedway event

The 2008 Team Speedway Junior European Championship was the 1st UEM Team Speedway Junior European Championship season. The Final took place on 22 May 2008 in Florian Kapała Stadium in Rawicz, Poland. First edition European Championship was won by Sweden team.

== Results ==
It was the first Championship title for Linus Eklöf (11 points in Final), Ludvig Lindgren (10 pts), Simon Gustafsson (9 pts), Linus Sundström (6 pts) and Niklas Larsson (0 heats).

In Semi Final 1 in Güstrow, Germany won Germany team (45 points). Second was Denmark (38 pts) and they were qualified also. Third was Croatia (28 pts) with Jurica Pavlic (the then Individual European Champion) who was the best rider in this meeting (18 points in 6 heats). Last was France (9 pts).

In Semi Final 2 in Wiener Neustadt, Austria won Sweden team (37 points). Second was Russia (31 pts) but they did not qualify because the 2nd team in SF1 Denmark had more points. Third Latvia (28 pts) and fourth Czech Republic (24 pts) did not-qualified also. The best rider in SF2 was Artem Laguta from Russia (15 points in 6 heats).

In the Final, Sweden team (36 points) beat Germany (29 pts), Denmark (28 pts) and Poland (26 pts). Champion title was won after 19th heat, when Lindgren beat German Erik Pudel. Silver medal for Germany was won after last heat, when Frank Facher was last, but Danish Patrick Hougaard took only one point. Poland lost chance for a bronze medal after the 19th heat: Dawid Lampart won, but Danish Simon Nielsen took one point. The best rider in Final was Maciej Janowski from Poland (15 points in 6 heats). Janowski won 2nd heat the best time (62.16 sek.).

- Semi-Final 1
- (Germany) Güstrow
- 23 March 2009

| Pos. | National team | Pts. |
|---|---|---|
| 1 | Germany | 45 |
| 2 | Denmark | 38 |
| 3 | Croatia | 28 |
| 4 | France | 9 |

- Semi-Final 2
- (Austria) Wiener Neustadt
- 19 April 2009

| Pos. | National team | Pts. |
|---|---|---|
| 1 | Sweden | 37 |
| 2 | Russia | 31 |
| 3 | Latvia | 28 |
| 4 | Czech Republic | 24 |

- The Final
- (Poland) Rawicz
- 22 May 2009

| Pos. | National team | Pts. |
|---|---|---|
| 1 | Sweden | 36 |
| 2 | Germany | 29 |
| 3 | Denmark | 28 |
| 4 | Poland | 26 |

== Heat details ==
=== Semi-Final 1 ===
- 23 March 2008
- (Germany) Güstrow
- Referee:
- Jury President:

| Placing | Team / Rider name | Total | 1 | 2 | 3 | 4 | 5 | 6 | 7 | 8 | 9 | 10 | 11 | 12 | 13 | 14 | 15 | 16 | Pts | 17 | 18 | 19 | 20 |
| 1 | Germany | 45 | 2 | 4 | 7 | 10 | 13 | 15 | 18 | 18 | 21 | 24 | 25 | 27 | 29 | 31 | 34 | 36 | | 39 | 41 | 44 | 45 |
| 1 | (9) Kevin Wölbert | 14 | | | 3 | | 3 | | | | | 3 | | | | | | 2 | 11 | | | 3 |
| 1 | (10) Max Dilger | 12 | | | | 3 | | 2 | | | 3 | | | | | | 3 | | 11 | | | | 1 |
| 1 | (11) Frank Facher | 4 | | 2 | | | | | | F | | | - | | | 2 | | | 4 | - |
| 1 | (12) Erik Pudel | 11 | 2 | | | | | | 3 | | | | | 2 | 2 | | | | 9 | | 2 |
| 1 | (19) Sönke Petersen | 4 | | | | | | | | | | | 1 | | | | | | 1 | 3 |
| 2 | Denmark | 38 | 1 | 4 | 6 | 8 | 10 | 11 | 13 | 16 | 18 | 18 | 20 | 23 | 23 | 26 | 28 | 29 | | 31 | 34 | 36 | 38 |
| 2 | (1) Patrick Hougaard | 14 | | | | 2 | | | | 3 | | | | 3 | | 3 | | 1 | 12 | | | | 2 |
| 2 | (2) Klaus Jakobsen | 10 | | | 2 | | | | 2 | | | | 2 | | | | 2 | | 8 | | | 2 |
| 2 | (3) Peter Juul Larsen | 4 | | 3 | | | | 1 | | | | E | | | E | | | | 4 | - |
| 2 | (4) Patrick Norgaard | 8 | 1 | | | | 2 | | | | 2 | | | | | - | | | 5 | | 3 |
| 2 | (17) Simon Nielsen | 2 | | | | | | | | | | | | | | | | | 0 | 2 |
| 3 | Croatia | 28 | 3 | 3 | 4 | 5 | 6 | 9 | 9 | 10 | 10 | 11 | 14 | 15 | 18 | 19 | 20 | 23 | | 24 | 25 | 25 | 28 |
| 3 | (5) Nikola Martinec | 0 | - | | | | | - | | | | | - | | | | | - | 0 | | | | - |
| 3 | (6) Renato Cvetko | 3 | | 0 | | | 1 | | | | | | | 1 | | | 1 | | 3 | | | 0 |
| 3 | (7) Nikola Pigac | 4 | | | | 1 | | | 0 | | | 1 | | | | 1 | | | 3 | | 1 |
| 3 | (8) Andrej Kezman | 3 | | | 1 | | | | | 1 | 0 | | | | - | | | | 2 | 1 |
| 3 | (18) Jurica Pavlič | 18 | 3 | | | | | 3 | | | | | 3 | | 3 | | | 3 | 15 | | | | 3 |
| 4 | France | 9 | 0 | 1 | 1 | 1 | 1 | 1 | 2 | 4 | 5 | 7 | 7 | 7 | 8 | 8 | 8 | 8 | | 8 | 8 | 9 | 9 |
| 4 | (13) Theo di Palma | 5 | | 1 | | | | | 1 | | 1 | | | | 1 | | | 0 | 4 | | | 1 |
| 4 | (14) Maxime Mazeau | 4 | 0 | | | | | | | 2 | | 2 | | | | | F | | 4 | | | | 0 |
| 4 | (15) Benoît Lorenzon | 0 | | | 0 | | | 0 | | | | | | 0 | | 0 | | | 0 | | 0 |
| 4 | (16) None | 0 | | | | N | N | | | | | | N | | - | | | | 0 | N |
| Placing | Team / Rider name | Total | 1 | 2 | 3 | 4 | 5 | 6 | 7 | 8 | 9 | 10 | 11 | 12 | 13 | 14 | 15 | 16 | Pts | 17 | 18 | 19 | 20 |

M - exclusion for exceeding two-minute time allowance • T - exclusion for touching the tapes • X - other exclusion • E - retired or mechanical failure • F - fell

Helmet colours were permanent for each team (Red, Blue, White and Yellow/Black). Colours in diagrams indicate gate positions:
| gate A – inside | gate B | gate C | gate D – outside |

=== Semi-Final 2 ===
- 19 April 2008 (2 pm)
- (Austria) Wiener Neustadt
- Referee: (Poland) Wojciech Grodzki
- Jury President: None (FMNR Jury Member (Austria) Susanne Hüttinger)
- Austria team was replaced by Latvia team.

| Placing | Team / Rider name | Total | 1 | 2 | 3 | 4 | 5 | 6 | 7 | 8 | 9 | 10 | 11 | 12 | 13 | 14 | 15 | 16 | Pts | 17 | 18 | 19 | 20 |
| 1 | Sweden | 37 | 2 | 4 | 6 | 9 | 11 | 13 | 15 | 17 | 19 | 22 | 24 | 26 | 29 | 31 | 33 | 33 | | 34 | 35 | 37 | 37 |
| 1 | (5) Simon Gustafsson | 7 | 2 | | | | | 2 | | | | | 2 | | | | | 0 | 6 | 1 |
| 1 | (6) Linus Eklöf | 9 | | 2 | | | 2 | | | | | | | 2 | | | 2 | | 8 | | 1 |
| 1 | (7) Ludvig Lindgren | 10 | | | | 3 | | | 2 | | | 3 | | | | 2 | | | 10 | | | | F |
| 1 | (8) Linus Sundström | 11 | | | 2 | | | | | 2 | 2 | | | | 3 | | | | 9 | | | 2 |
| 1 | (18) Kim Nilsson | 0 | | | | | | | | | | | | | | | | | 0 |
| 2 | Russia | 31 | 3 | 4 | 7 | 7 | 10 | 10 | 11 | 14 | 14 | 14 | 17 | 18 | 20 | 23 | 24 | 27 | | 27 | 29 | 29 | 31 |
| 2 | (9) None | 0 | | | - | | - | | | | | - | | | | | | - | 0 | | - |
| 2 | (10) None | 0 | | | | N | | N | | | N | | | | | | - | | 0 | N |
| 2 | (11) Artem Laguta | 15 | | 1 | | | | | | 3 | | | 3 | | | 3 | | 3 | 13 | | | | 2 |
| 2 | (12) Artem Vodyakov | 8 | 3 | | | | | | 1 | | | | | 1 | 2 | | 1 | | 8 | | | E |
| 2 | (19) Oleg Beschastnov | 8 | | | 3 | | 3 | | | | | 0 | | | | | | | 6 | | 2 |
| 3 | Latvia | 28 | 0 | 3 | 3 | 4 | 5 | 6 | 9 | 10 | 13 | 14 | 15 | 15 | 16 | 17 | 20 | 21 | | 23 | 26 | 27 | 28 |
| 3 | (13) Maksims Bogdanovs | 14 | | 3 | | | | | 3 | | 3 | | | | | | | 1 | 10 | | 3 | | 1 |
| 3 | (14) Jevgēņijs Karavackis | 6 | 0 | | | | | | | 1 | | 1 | | | | | 3 | | 5 | | | 1 |
| 3 | (15) Vjačeslavs Giruckis | 4 | | | 0 | | | 1 | | | | | | 0 | | 1 | | | 2 | 2 |
| 3 | (16) Jevgeņijs Petuhovs | 4 | | | | 1 | 1 | | | | | | 1 | | 1 | | | | 4 | | - |
| 4 | Czech Republic | 24 | 1 | 1 | 2 | 4 | 4 | 7 | 7 | 7 | 8 | 10 | 10 | 13 | 13 | 13 | 13 | 15 | | 18 | 18 | 21 | 24 |
| 4 | (1) Matěj Kůs | 13 | | | | 2 | | | | 0 | | | | 3 | | | | 2 | 7 | 3 | | | 3 |
| 4 | (2) Michal Dudek | 1 | | | 1 | | | | 0 | | | | 0 | | | | - | | 1 | | 0 |
| 4 | (3) Michael Hádek | 8 | | 0 | | | | 3 | | | | 2 | | | E | | 0 | | 5 | | | 3 |
| 4 | (4) Pavel Fuksa | 1 | 1 | | | | F/X | | | | - | | | | | - | | | 1 | - |
| 4 | (17) Pavel Pucko | 1 | | | | | | | | | 1 | | | | | 0 | | | 1 |
| Placing | Team / Rider name | Total | 1 | 2 | 3 | 4 | 5 | 6 | 7 | 8 | 9 | 10 | 11 | 12 | 13 | 14 | 15 | 16 | Pts | 17 | 18 | 19 | 20 |

M - exclusion for exceeding two-minute time allowance • T - exclusion for touching the tapes • X - other exclusion • E - retired or mechanical failure • F - fell

Helmet colours were permanent for each team (Red, Blue, White and Yellow/Black). Colours in diagrams indicate gate positions:
| gate A – inside | gate B | gate C | gate D – outside |

=== The Final ===
- 22 May 2008 (5 pm.)
- (Poland) Rawicz, Florian Kapała Stadium
- Referee: (Hungary) I. Darago
- Jury President: (Ukraine) S. Lyatosinskyy
- Attendance: 1,500
- Beat Time: 62.16 - Maciej Janowski (POL) in 2nd heat

| Placing | Team / Rider name | Total | 1 | 2 | 3 | 4 | 5 | 6 | 7 | 8 | 9 | 10 | 11 | 12 | 13 | 14 | 15 | 16 | Pts | 17 | 18 | 19 | 20 |
| 1 | Sweden | 36 | 3 | 4 | 6 | 7 | 8 | 11 | 14 | 17 | 19 | 20 | 23 | 25 | 25 | 26 | 28 | 29 | | 30 | 32 | 34 | 36 |
| 1 | (13) Simon Gustafsson | 9 | | 1 | | | | | 3 | | 2 | | | | | | | 1 | 7 | | 2 |
| 1 | (14) Linus Eklöf | 11 | 3 | | | | | | | 3 | | 1 | | | | | 2 | | 9 | | | | 2 |
| 1 | (15) Ludvig Lindgren | 10 | | | 2 | | | 3 | | | | | | 2 | | 1 | | | 8 | | | 2 |
| 1 | (16) Linus Sundström | 6 | | | | 1 | 1 | | | | | | 3 | | X | | | | 5 | 1 |
| 1 | (20) Niklas Larsson | 0 | | | | | | | | | | | | | | | | | 0 |
| 2 | Germany | 29 | 1 | 3 | 6 | 8 | 8 | 10 | 11 | 11 | 11 | 13 | 15 | 18 | 20 | 22 | 23 | 26 | | 26 | 29 | 29 | 29 |
| 2 | (1) Max Dilger | 2 | | | | 2 | | | | E4 | | | | - | | | | - | 2 | | - |
| 2 | (2) Erik Pudel | 7 | | | 3 | | | | 1 | | | | 2 | | | | 1 | | 7 | | | 0 |
| 2 | (3) Frank Facher | 8 | | 2 | | | | 2 | | | | 2 | | | 2 | | | | 8 | | | | 0 |
| 2 | (4) Sönke Petersen | 0 | - | | | | - | | | | 0 | | | | | - | | | 0 | E4 |
| 2 | (17) Kevin Wölbert | 12 | 1 | | | | E4 | | | | | | | 3 | | 2 | | 3 | 9 | | 3 |
| 3 | Denmark | 28 | 2 | 2 | 3 | 6 | 9 | 10 | 10 | 12 | 13 | 16 | 17 | 17 | 20 | 20 | 20 | 22 | | 25 | 26 | 27 | 28 |
| 3 | (9) Patrick Hougaard | 13 | | | 1 | | 3 | | | | | 3 | | | 3 | | | 2 | 12 | | | | 1 |
| 3 | (10) Klaus Jakobsen | 5 | | | | 3 | | 1 | | | 1 | | | | | | 0 | | 5 | | | - |
| 3 | (11) Peter Juul Larsen | 4 | | 0 | | | | | | 2 | | | 1 | | | 0 | | | 3 | | 1 |
| 3 | (12) Patrick Norgaard | 2 | 2 | | | | | | 0 | | | | | - | - | | | | 2 | - |
| 3 | (19) Simon Nielsen | 4 | | | | | | | | | | | | 0 | | | | | 0 | 3 | | 1 |
| 4 | Poland | 26 | 0 | 3 | 3 | 3 | 5 | 5 | 7 | 8 | 11 | 11 | 11 | 12 | 12 | 15 | 18 | 18 | | 20 | 20 | 23 | 26 |
| 4 | (5) Marcel Kajzer | 2 | E1 | | | | | X/F | | | | | E4 | | | | | - | 0 | 2 |
| 4 | (6) Maciej Janowski | 15 | | 3 | | | 2 | | | | 3 | | | 1 | | | 3 | | 12 | | | | 3 |
| 4 | (7) Borys Miturski | 2 | | | | 0 | | | 2 | | | 0 | | | | - | | | 2 | | | - |
| 4 | (8) Michał Łopaczewski | 0 | | | 0 | | | | | - | - | | | | M | | | | 0 | | - |
| 4 | (18) Dawid Lampart | 7 | | | | | | | | 1 | | | | | | 3 | | 0 | 4 | | X/F | 3 |
| Placing | Team / Rider name | Total | 1 | 2 | 3 | 4 | 5 | 6 | 7 | 8 | 9 | 10 | 11 | 12 | 13 | 14 | 15 | 16 | Pts | 17 | 18 | 19 | 20 |

M - exclusion for exceeding two-minute time allowance • T - exclusion for touching the tapes • X - other exclusion • E - retired or mechanical failure • F - fell

Helmet colours were permanent for each team (Red, Blue, White and Yellow/Black). Colours in diagrams indicate gate positions:
| gate A – inside | gate B | gate C | gate D – outside |

Heat after heat

1. (62.75) Ekloef, Norgaard, Wölbert, Kajzer (E1)
2. (62.16) Janowski, Facher, Gustafsson, Larsen
3. (63.03) Pudel, Lindgren, Hougaard, Łopaczewski
4. (64.97) Jakobsen, Dilger, Sundström, Miturski
5. (63.56) Hougaard, Janowski, Sundström, Wölbert(E4)
6. (63.93) Lindgren, Facher, Jakobsen, Kajzer (X)
7. (63.19) Gustafsson, Miturski, Pudel, Norgaard
8. (64.37) Ekloef, Larsen, Lampart, Dilger (E4)
9. (62.61) Janowski, Gustafsson, Jakobsen, Petersen
10. (63.53) Hougaard, Facher, Ekloef, Miturski
11. (64.03) Sundström, Pudel, Larsen, Kajzer (E)
12. (63.97) Wölbert, Lindgren, Janowski, Nielsen
13. (65.31) Hougaard, Facher, Sundström(X), Łoaczewski (M)
14. (63.44) Lampart, Wölbert, Lindgren, Larsen
15. (64.66) Janowski, Ekloef, Pudel, Jakobsen
16. (64.59) Wölbert, Hougaard, Gustafsson, Lampart
17. (65.40) Nielsen, Kajzer, Sundström, Petersen (E4)
18. (65.59) Wölbert, Gustafsson, Larsen, Lampart (X)
19. (65.03) Lampart, Lindgren, Nielsen, Pudel
20. (65.16) Janowski, Ekloef, Hougaard, Facher

== See also ==
- 2008 Team Speedway Junior World Championship
- 2008 Individual Speedway Junior European Championship
