= Florian Kapała Stadium =

Stadium in Rawicz, Poland

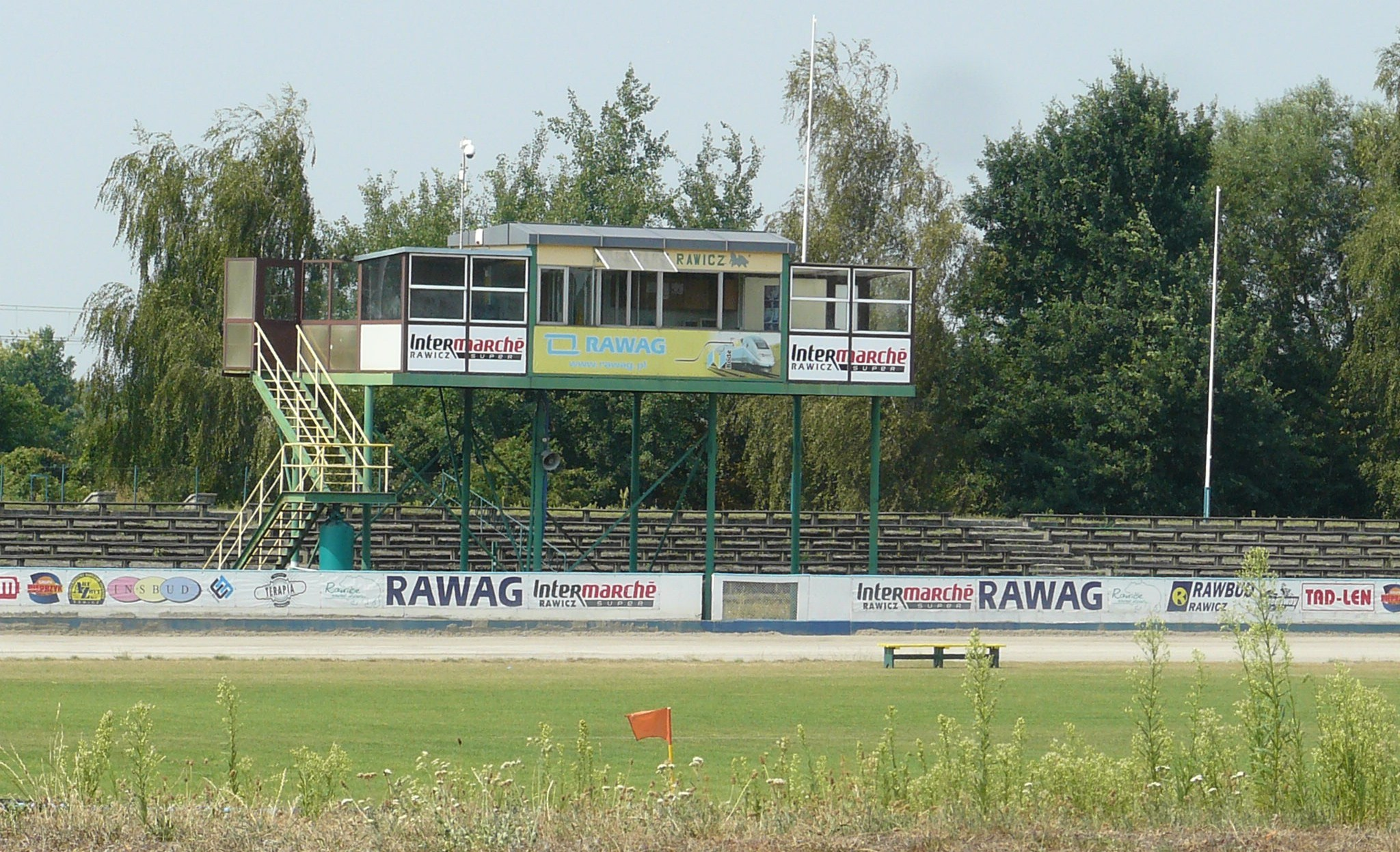
- The stadium in 2015
- Location: Generała Grota-Roweckiego 13, 63-900 Rawicz, Poland
- Coordinates: 51°36′58″N 16°50′12″E
- Capacity: 7,000
- Length: 0.330 km (0.205 mi)

The Florian Kapała Stadium (Polish: Stadion żużlowy im. Floriana Kapały Rawicz) is a 7,000-capacity motorcycle speedway stadium in the northwest area of Rawicz, Poland.

The venue is used by the speedway team Kolejarz Rawicz, who compete in the Team Speedway Polish Championship.

== History ==
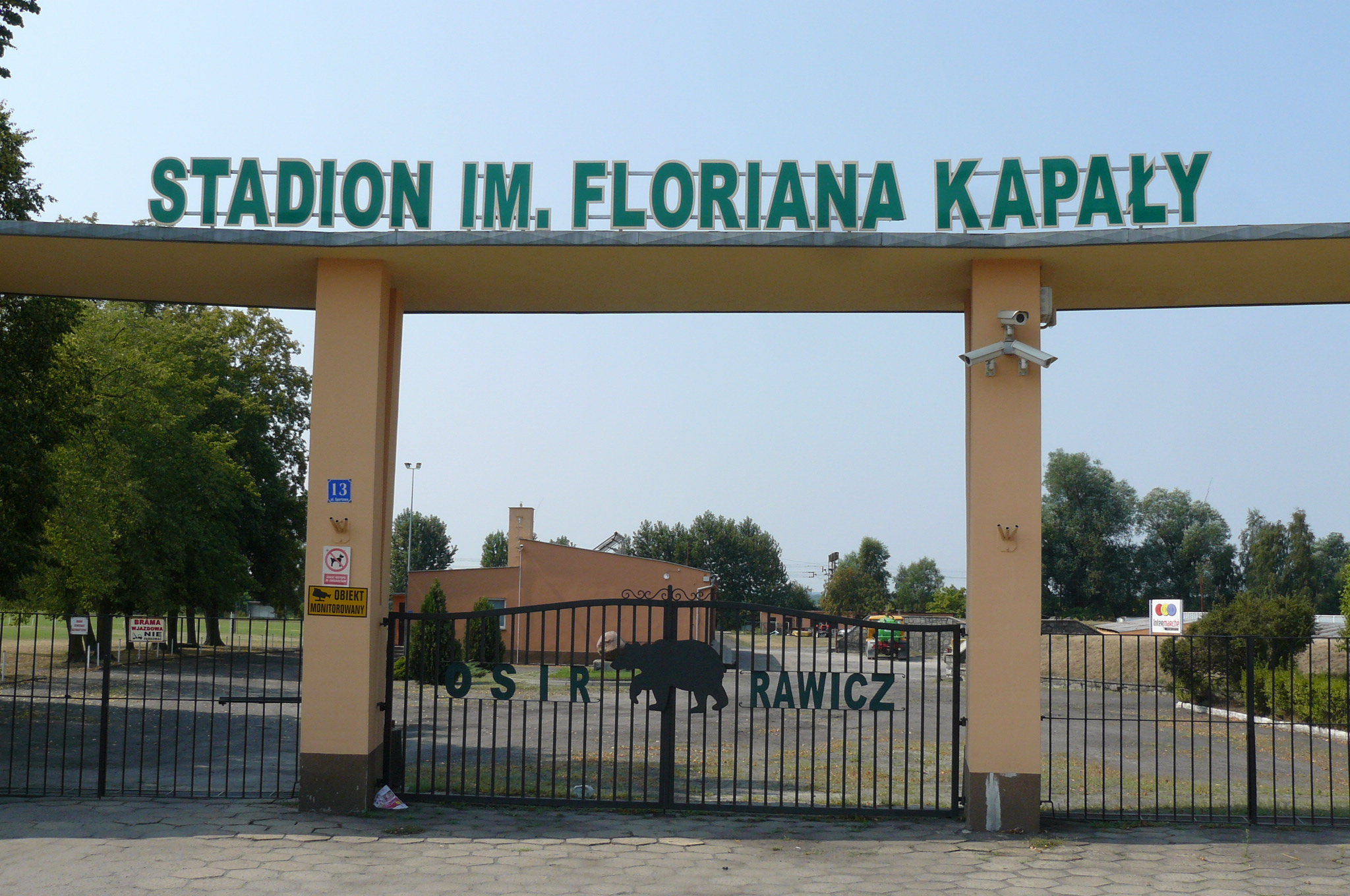
The stadium was renamed in 2008

The stadium hosted speedway before World War II but it was not until 1948 that Kolejarz Rawicz became the tenants of the stadium.

On 26 March 2008, the club renamed their stadium to the Florian Kapała Stadium, named after a former rider Florian Kapała, who died in 2007. Two months later on 22 May 2008, the venue hosted the 2008 Team Speedway Junior European Championship, which was the inaugural edition of the competition.
