= Niklas Larsson =

Swedish motorcycle speedway rider (born 1989)

- Born: 31 March 1989 (age 37)
- Nationality: Sweden

Current club information
- Polish league: None
- Swedish league: Dackarna

Career history
- 2008: Opole (POL)
- 2002-2003: Piraterna (SWE)
- 2006: Vetlanda (SWE)
- 2009: Dackarna (SWE)

Team honours
- 2008: U-19 European Champion

Niklas Larsson (born 31 March 1989) is a Swedish motorcycle speedway rider who won the Team U-19 European Champion title in 2008.

== Career details ==
=== World Championships ===
- Individual U-21 World Championship
  - 2008 - 8th place in Qualifying Round 5

=== European Championships ===
- Individual U-19 European Championship
  - 2008 - 10th place in Semi-Final 2
- Team U-19 European Championship
  - 2008 - (Poland) Rawicz - European Champion (0 heats)

== See also ==
- Sweden national speedway team
