= Linus Eklöf =

Swedish speedway rider

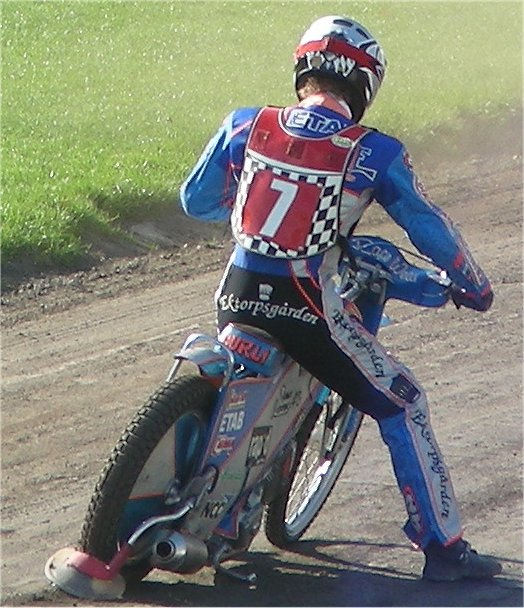
- Born: 3 March 1989 (age 37); Eskilstuna, Sweden
- Nationality: Swedish

Career history

Sweden
- 2015: Ornarna
- 2016-2018: Smederna
- 2021-2022: Lejonen

Poland
- 2007-2009: Gniezno

Great Britain
- 2009–2010: King's Lynn Stars
- 2010: Peterborough Panthers
- 2011: Berwick Bandits
- 2011–2012: Belle Vue Aces
- 2012, 2013: Leicester Lions
- 2015: Plymouth Devils

Denmark
- 2011: Fjelsted
- 2013, 2018: Slangerup

Team honours
- 2008: U-19 European Champion
- 2009: Premier League
- 2009: Premier Trophy
- 2009: Premier League Knockout Cup
- 2017, 2018, 2019: Swedish Elitserien Champion

Linus Eklöf (born 3 March 1989) is a Swedish former motorcycle speedway rider, who won the Team U-19 European Champion title in 2008.

== Career ==
In 2009, Eklöf rode in the Premier League in the UK, averaging over six points per match for treble-winning King's Lynn Stars, staying with them in 2010 (averaging over 7 that season) and also riding in the Elite League for Peterborough Panthers. He left British speedway in June 2010 for personal reasons, returning in 2011 with Berwick Bandits in the Premier League and Belle Vue Aces in the Elite League.

Eklöf reached the Swedish individual final in 2010. In July 2012, he was signed by Premier League Leicester Lions after leaving Belle Vue.

In 2022, Eklöf came out of retirement to help with the rider shortage (due to injuries) at Lejonen.

== Career details ==
=== World Championships ===
- Individual U-21 World Championship
  - 2007 - 18th place in Qualifying round 2 as track reserve
  - 2008 - 11th place in Semi-Final 1
- Team U-21 World Championship (Under-21 World Cup)
  - 2009 - (Poland) Gorzów Wlkp. - 3rd place (5 pts)

=== European Championships ===
- Individual U-19 European Championship
  - 2008 - (Germany) Stralsund - 8th place (8 pts)
- Team U-19 European Championship
  - 2008 - (Poland) Rawicz - European Champion (11 pts)

== See also ==
- Sweden national speedway team
