= Denmark national under-19 speedway team =

Motorcycle group

Denmark
- Association: Danish Motor Union; Danmarks Motor Union
- FIM code: DMU
- Team manager: Jan Stæchmann
- Team captain: René Bach
- Nation colour: Red and White

European Championships
Team U-19	—	—	2
- Best result: 3rd (2008 and 2009)
Individual U-19	2	2	3
- Best result: 1st - Kenneth Bjerre (2003), Nicolai Klindt (2007)

The Denmark national under-19 speedway team is the national under-19 motorcycle speedway team of Denmark and is controlled by the Danish Motor Union. The team started in Team U-19 European Championship in all editions and won two bronze medals. Denmark has produced two Under-19 European Champions: Kenneth Bjerre (2003), Nicolai Klindt (2007).

== Competition ==
Team Speedway Junior European Championship
Year	Place	Pts.	Riders
2008	3	28	Patrick Hougaard (13), Klaus Jakobsen (5), Peter Juul Larsen (4), Simon Nielsen (4), Patrick Norgaard (2)
2009	3	26	Michael Jepsen Jensen (10), René Bach (9), Michael Palm Toft (6), Simon Nielsen (1), Patrick Bjerregaard (0)

== See also ==
- Denmark national speedway team
- Denmark national under-21 speedway team
