= France national under-21 speedway team =

National motorcycle racing team

France
- Association: French Motorcycle Federation; Fédération Française de Motocyclisme
- FIM code: FFM
- Nation colour: Blue, White and Red

World Championships
Team U-21	—	—	—
Individual U-21	—	—	—

The France national under-21 speedway team is the national under-21 motorcycle speedway team of France and is controlled by the Finnish Motorcycling Federation. The team was withdrew from 2005 Under-21 World Cup and was never started in Under-21 World Cup.

== Competition ==
Team Speedway Junior World Championship
Year	Place	Pts.	Riders
2005	—	—	Withdrew in Qualifying Round Three and replaced by Poland B
2006–2009			Did not enter

== Riders ==
Riders who started in Individual Speedway Junior World Championship:

- Jeremy Diraison (2007)
- Gabriel Dubernard (2009)
- Maxime Mazeau (2008)
- Théo Di Palma (2008, 2009)
- Matthieu Tresarrieu (2007)

== See also ==
- France national speedway team
- France national under-19 speedway team
