= Latvia national under-21 speedway team =

Latvia
- Association: Latvian Motorcyclists Federation; Latvijas Motosporta Federācija
- FIM code: LaMSF

World Championships
Team U-21	—	—	—
Individual U-21	—	—	—

The Latvia national under-21 speedway team is the national under-21 motorcycle speedway team of Latvia and is controlled by the Latvian Motorcyclists Federation. The team was withdrew from 2006 Under-21 World Cup and was never started in Under-21 World Cup.

== Competition ==
Team Speedway Junior World Championship
Year	Place	Pts.	Riders
2005			Did not enter
2006	—	—	Withdrew in Qualifying Round One and replaced by Germany B
2007–2009			Did not enter

== See also ==
- Latvia national speedway team
- Latvia national under-19 speedway team
