= European Under-24 Team Speedway Championship =

Annual European Junior motorcycle speedway event

European Under 23 Team Speedway Championship
- Current season, competition or edition: 2024 European Under 23 Team Speedway Championship
- Formerly: U19 & U21 Team Championships
- Sport: motorcycle speedway
- Founded: 2008

The European Under-23 Team Speedway Championship, formerly known as the Team Speedway Junior European Championship is an annual motorcycle speedway event. Inaugurated as a European Under-19 competition, the competition age limits have twice been amended. Since 2021, the event has been staged as the European Under-23 Team Championship.

The inaugural 2008 edition was staged at the Florian Kapała Stadium in Rawicz, Poland, and won by the Swedish team. The next two editions were won by the Poland national under-19 speedway team.

The event is organised by FIM Europe, formerly known as the European Motorcycle Union (UEM) from 2008 until December 2012.

== Age Limits ==
- From 2008 to 2011 the age limit was under 19.
- From 2012 to 2020, the age limit was under 21.
- From 2021, the age limit was under 23.

== Previous winners ==
Year	Venue	Winners	Runner-up	3rd place	ref
Team Speedway Junior European Championship (U-19)
2008	(Poland) Rawicz	Sweden (36 pts); Linus Eklöf; Ludvig Lindgren; Simon Gustafsson; Linus Sundström; Niklas Larsson	Germany (29 pts); Frank Facher; Erik Pudel; Max Dilger; Sönke Petersen; Kevin Wölbert	Denmark (28 pts); Patrick Hougaard; Klaus Jakobsen; Peter Juul Larsen; Patrick Norgaard; Simon Nielsen	
2009	(Denmark) Grindsted	Poland (40 pts); Przemysław Pawlicki; Patryk Dudek; Maciej Janowski; Dawid Lampart; Sławomir Musielak	Sweden (38 pts); Simon Gustafsson; Ludvig Lindgren; Dennis Andersson; Anton Rosén; Linus Sundström	Denmark (26 pts); Michael Jepsen Jensen; René Bach; Michael Palm Toft; Patrick Bjerregaard; Simon Nielsen	
2010	(Czech Republic) Divišov	Poland (56 pts); Przemysław Pawlicki; Patryk Dudek; Maciej Janowski; Kacper Gomólski; Łukasz Cyran	Sweden (25 pts); Anton Rosén; Alexander Edberg; Andre Hertzberg; Sebastian Carlsson; Victor Palovaara	Czech Republic (23 pts); Roman Čejka; Václav Milík, Jr. Pavol Pucko; Jan Holub III; Jakub Fencl	
2011	(Slovenia) Lendava	Russia (42 pts); Vitaliy Belousov; Vladimir Borodulin; Ilija Czałow; Maxim Lobzenko; Vadim Tarasenko	Denmark (36 pts); Mikkel Michelsen; Mikkel B. Jensen; Jonas B. Andersen; Michael Jepsen Jensen; Nikolaj Busk Jakobsen	Sweden (26 pts); Joel Larsson; Oliver Berntzon; Jacob Thorssell; Victor Palovaara; Mathias Thoernblom	
European Under-21 Team Speedway Championship.
2012	(Germany) Landshut	Poland (48 pts); Przemysław Pawlicki; Piotr Pawlicki Jr. Kacper Gomólski; Tobiasz Musielak; Łukasz Sówka	Denmark (41 pts); Nikolaj Busk Jakobsen; Mikkel Bech Jensen; Mikkel Michelsen; Nicklas Porsing; Emil Grondal	Ukraine (19 pts); Andriy Kobrin; Kirill Tsukanov; Stanislav Melnychuk; Volodymyr Teygel; Oleksandr Loktaev	
2013	(Poland) Opole	Poland (50 pts); Piotr Pawlicki Jr. Krystian Pieszczek; Bartosz Zmarzlik; Paweł Przedpełski; Artur Czaja	Denmark (30 pts); Nikolaj Busk Jakobsen; Anders Thomsen; Kenni Nissen; Rasmus Jensen; Emil Grondal	Czech Republic (27 pts); Václav Milík Jr. Eduard Krčmář; Michal Skurla; Roman Cejka; Zdeněk Holub	
2014	(Germany) Herxheim	Poland (49 pts); Piotr Pawlicki Jr. Krystian Pieszczek; Bartosz Zmarzlik; Paweł Przedpełski; Adrian Cyfer	Denmark (28 pts); Nikolaj Busk Jakobsen; Anders Thomsen; Mikkel Breum Andersen; Kasper Lykke Nielsen; Jonas Andersen	Czech Republic (25 pts); Václav Milík Jr. Eduard Krčmář; Zdeněk Holub; Ondřej Smetana; Roman Cejka	
2015	(Czech Republic) Plzeň	Poland (35 pts); Krystian Pieszczek; Kacper Woryna; Bartosz Smektała; Adrian Cyfer; Krystian Rempała	Sweden (34 pts); Joel Andersson; Victor Palovaara; Kenny Wennerstam; Fredrik Engman; John Lindman	Denmark (30 pts); Emil Grondal; Patrick Hansen; Andreas Lyager; Mikkel B. Andersen; Frederik Jakobsen	
2016	(Germany) Stralsund	Poland (46 pts); Kacper Woryna; Bartosz Smektała; Dominik Kubera; Rafał Karczmarz; Daniel Kaczmarek	Denmark (35 pts); Andreas Lyager; Kasper Andersen; Frederik Jakobsen; Jonas Jeppesen; Mikkel B. Andersen	Germany (25 pts); Dominik Moeser; Michael Härtel; Lukas Fienhage; Daniel Spiller; Erik Riss	
2017	(Poland) Krosno	Poland (45 pts); Kacper Woryna; Bartosz Smektała; Dominik Kubera; Rafał Karczmarz; Jakub Miśkowiak	Denmark (35 pts); Frederik Jakobsen; Mikkel B. Andersen; Tim Sørensen; Kasper Andersen; Mads Hansen	Latvia (33 pts); Davis Kurmis; Jevgeņijs Kostigovs; Oļegs Mihailovs; Artem Trofimov	
2018	(Latvia) Daugavpils	Denmark (45 pts); Mads Hansen; Patrick Hansen; Andreas Lyager; Frederik Jakobsen	Poland (37 pts); Wiktor Lampart; Rafal Karczmarz; Dominik Kubera; Igor Kopec-Sobczynski; Daniel Kaczmarek	Latvia (21 pts); Oļegs Mihailovs; Artem Trofimov; Davis Kurmis; Ernest Matjuszonok; Elvis Avgucevics	
2019	(France) Lamothe-Landerron	Poland (50+3 pts); Dominik Kubera; Jakub Miśkowiak; Wiktor Lampart; Mateusz Cierniak; Viktor Trofimov Jr.	Denmark (50+2 pts); Mads Hansen; Jonas Seifert-Salk; Tim Sørensen; Jason Jorgensen; Jonas Jeppesen	Sweden (16 pts); Christoffer Selvin; Emil Millberg; William Bjorling; Filip Hjelmland	
2020	(Poland) Łódź	Poland (27 pts); Jakub Miśkowiak; Dominik Kubera; Norbert Krakowiak; Mateusz Cierniak	Denmark (21+3 pts); Mads Hansen; Jonas Seifert-Salk; Marcus Birkemose; Matias Nielsen	Latvia (21+2 pts); Oļegs Mihailovs; Ričards Ansviesulis; Francis Gusts; Ernest Matjuszonok	
European Under-23 Team Speedway Championship
2021	(Latvia) Daugavpils	Poland (47 pts); Jakub Miśkowiak; Bartosz Smektała; Wiktor Lampart; Dominik Kubera; Gleb Chugunov	Denmark (35 pts); Frederik Jakobsen; Jonas Jeppesen; Mads Hansen; Patrick Hansen	Latvia (27 pts); Francis Gusts; Oļegs Mihailovs; Ričards Ansviesulis; Daniil Kolodinski; Ernest Matjuszonok	
2022	(Poland) Tarnów	Poland (46 pts); Bartłomiej Kowalski; Jakub Miśkowiak; Wiktor Lampart; Mateusz Cierniak; Dominik Kubera	Denmark (38 pts); Matias Nielsen; Jonas Seifert-Salk; Mads Hansen; Tim Sørensen; Kevin Juhl Pedersen	Great Britain (23 pts); Dan Bewley; Leon Flint; Tom Brennan; Drew Kemp; Jason Edwards	
2023	(France) Mâcon	Poland (45 pts); Bartłomiej Kowalski; Wiktor Przyjemski; Jakub Miśkowiak; Mateusz Cierniak; Damian Ratajczak	Denmark (37 pts); Mads Hansen; Tim Sørensen; Kevin Juhl Pedersen; Jonas Seifert-Salk; Emil Breum	Sweden (27 pts); Casper Henriksson; Anton Karlsson; Jonatan Grahn; Noel Wahlquist	
2024	(Poland) Kraków	Poland (43 pts); Bartłomiej Kowalski; Wiktor Przyjemski; Bartosz Bańbor; Mateusz Cierniak; Jakub Krawczyk	Czech Republic (31 pts); Daniel Klíma; Adam Bednář; Jan Kvěch; Jan Macek; Matous Kamenik	Denmark (25 pts); Benjamin Basso; Vilads Nagel; Kevin Juhl Pedersen; Mikkel Andersen; Bastian Pedersen	

== Classification ==
Pos	National Team	Gold	Silver	Bronze
1.	Poland	14	1	
2.	Denmark	1	11	4
3.	Sweden	1	3	3
4.	Russia	1		
5.	Czech Republic		1	3
6.	Germany		1	1
7.	Latvia			4
8.	Ukraine			1
	Great Britain			1
