= Jurica Pavlic =

Croatian speedway rider

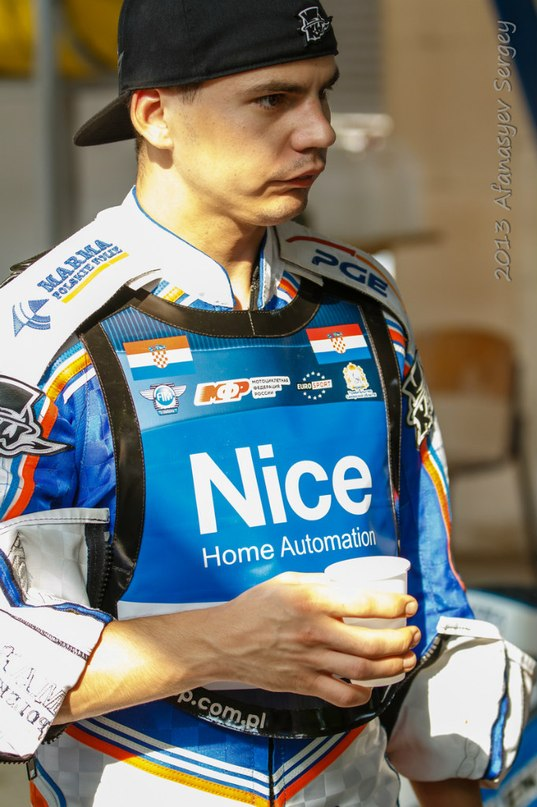
- Born: 14 June 1989 (age 37); Goričan, Croatia
- Nationality: Croatian

Career history

Poland
- 2006: Lublin
- 2007–2012: Leszno
- 2013: Rzeszów
- 2014: Wrocław
- 2015: Grudziądz
- 2018–2020: Gniezno

Great Britain
- 2008: Swindon

Sweden
- 2009: Vetlanda
- 2011: Dackarna
- 2012: Västervik

Individual honours
- 2007: European Champion
- 2006: U-19 European Champion
- 2015: Golden Helmet of Pardubice
- 2003-2009: Croatian Champion

Team honours
- 2007: Polish Ekstraliga Champion

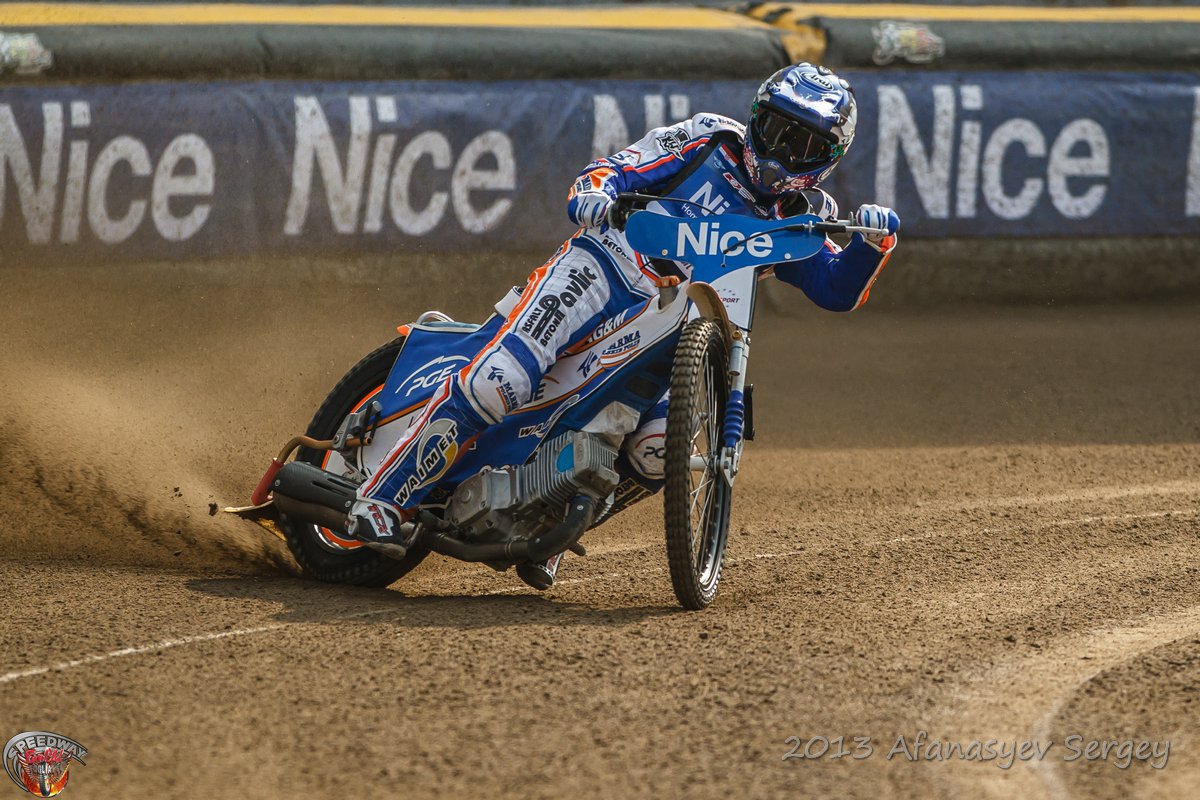

Jurica Pavlic (born 14 June 1989) is a Croatian speedway rider. He was a member of the Croatia national speedway team.

== Career ==
Pavlic was the 2007 Individual European Champion and winner of the 2006 Under-19 Individual European Championship. He rode for Unia Leszno from 2007 to 2012, in the Polish Ekstraliga.

In 2008, Pavlic rode for the Swindon Robins in the British Elite League. He reached the final of the 2009 Individual Speedway Junior World Championship.

== Personal life ==
Pavlic was born in Goričan, Croatia.

Pavlic's father, Zvonko, was also a speedway rider, and was a three-time Yugoslavian Champion.

== Speedway Grand Prix results ==
2007 Speedway Grand Prix Final Championship standings (Riding No 16)
Race no.	Grand Prix	Pos.	Pts.	Heats	Draw No
10 /11	(Slovenia) Slovenian SGP	13	5	(2,0,0,2,1)	6

permanent speedway rider
wild card, track reserve or qualified reserve
rider not classified (track reserve who did not start)

== Honours ==
=== Individual U-21 World Championship ===
- 2006 - 11th place (5 points)
- 2007 - 4th place (10 points)
- 2008 - 3rd place (12 points)
  - 2009 - (Croatia) Goričan - Runner-up place (12+3 pts)

=== Individual European Championship ===
- 2006 - 12th place (6 points)
- 2007 - Winner (14 points)

=== Individual U-19 European Championship ===
- 2006 - Winner (14 points)
- 2007 - 2nd (11 points)

=== European Pairs Championship ===
- 2007 - 5th place in Semi-Final 2 (15 points)

=== U-19 European Team Championship ===
- 2008 - 3rd place in Semi-Final (18 points)

=== European Club Champions' Cup ===
- 2007 - 4th place (2 points)

=== Polish Ekstraliga Championship ===
- 2007 - Champion with Unia Leszno

== See also ==
- Croatia national speedway team
- List of Speedway Grand Prix riders
