= Vadim Tarasenko =

Russian speedway rider (born 1994)

- Born: 12 May 1994 (age 32); Sukhodol, Russia
- Nationality: Russian (rides on a Polish licence)

Career history

Russia
- 2009–2018: Vostok Vladivostok
- 2021: Togliatti

Poland
- 2010–2013 2018–2020: Daugavpils
- 2014–2015: Start Gniezno
- 2016–2017: Piła
- 2020: Krosno
- 2021: Bydgoszcz
- 2023–2025: Grudziądz

Sweden
- 2020: Masarna
- 2021: Västervik
- 2024: Smederna
- 2025: Rospiggarna

Denmark
- 2014, 2016: Holstebro
- 2025: Region Varde

Great Britain
- 2023: Peterborough
- 2023: Glasgow
- 2024: King's Lynn

Team honours
- 2023: SGB Championship winner

Vadim Vladimirovich Tarasenko (born 12 May 1994) is a Russian motorcycle speedway rider, who rides on a Polish licence.

== Career ==
As a 15 years old, Tarasenko's first speedway club was Vostok Vladivostok from Russia. He started in Individual Under-19 Russian Championship final, finishing third. Tarasenko finishing 11th at under-21 championship, scoring five points.

In January 2010, Tarasenko signed a four years contract in Polish league for Latvian Lokomotiv Daugavpils. On 15 May, he was confirmed for starting in Polish league (minimum 16 years old). From that day, he can compete in the Polish league.

Three days after his 16th birthday, Tarasenko started in 2010 Individual Speedway Junior World Championship Qualifying Round Three in Gdańsk, Poland. Tarasenko and his uncle Artem Laguta won qualify to the semi-final One on 26 June in Krško, Slovenia.

After missing the 2022 season due to the FIM-sanctioned ban because of the invasion of Ukraine by Russia, Tarasenko obtained a Polish licence (as did his uncle Artem Laguta). He signed for GKM Grudziądz for the 2023 Polish speedway season. Tarasenko also made his British leagues debut in 2023, when he signed for Peterborough Panthers but then made a huge impact for Glasgow Tigers, signing for the team late in the season, which proved to be the catalyst for Glasgow winning the play offs and claiming the division 2 title.

Tarasenko signed for the King's Lynn Stars for the 2024 season, but parted company with the club shortly after the season started.

== Personal life ==
Tarasenko's mother is an older sister of Grigory Laguta (born 1984) and Artem Laguta (born 1990).

== Results ==
=== World Championships ===
- Individual U-21 World Championship (Under-21 World Championship)
  - 2010 - qualify to the Semi-Final

== See also ==
- Russia national under-21 speedway team
