= Germany national under-21 speedway team =

Germany
- Association: German Motor Union; Deutscher Motor Sport Bund
- FIM code: DMSB
- Team captain: Kevin Wölbert ^{(2010)}
- Nation colour: Black, red and yellow

World Championships
Team U-21	1	—	—
- Best result: 1st (2025)
Individual U-21	—	—	1
- Best result: 3rd - Christian Hefenbrock (2006)

The Germany national under-21 speedway team is the national under-21 motorcycle speedway team of Germany and is controlled by the Deutscher Motor Sport Bund. The team has started in all editions of Under-21 World Cup, winning the competition in 2025. Christian Hefenbrock is the first, and so far, only medalist in Individual competition.

== Competition ==
Team Speedway Junior World Championship
Year	Place	Pts.	Riders
2005	—	—	2nd place in Qualifying Round One; Martin Smolinski (8), Matthias Schultz (8), Thomas Stange (8), Christian Hefenbrock (6), Tobias Kroner (3)
2006	4	25	Christian Hefenbrock (10), Tobias Kroner (7), Kevin Wölbert (6), Max Dilger (2), Tobias Busch (—); In Qualifying Round One also rode: Thomas Stange
2007	4	13	Richard Speiser (6), Max Dilger (4), Kevin Wölbert (3), Tobias Busch (0), Frank Facher (0)
2008	—	—	3rd place in Qualifying Round Two; Richard Speiser (10), Frank Facher (10), Kevin Wölbert (8), Max Dilger (6), Erik Pudel (2)
2009	—	—	2nd place in Qualifying Round One; Kevin Wölbert (12), Frank Facher (11), Erik Pudel (9), Max Dilger (8), Sönke Petersen (0)
2010	—	—	3rd place in Qualifying Round Two; Kevin Wölbert (11), Frank Facher (8), Kai Huckenbeck (6), Erik Pudel (2), Max Dilger (1)

=== Team B ===
Team Speedway Junior World Championship
Year	Place	Pts.	Riders
2006	—	—	4th place in Qualifying Round One; Frank Facher (3), Stefan Kurz (1), Christoph Demmel (1), Manfred Betz (0)

== See also ==
- Germany national speedway team
- Germany national under-19 speedway team
