= Alex Edberg =

Swedish speedway rider

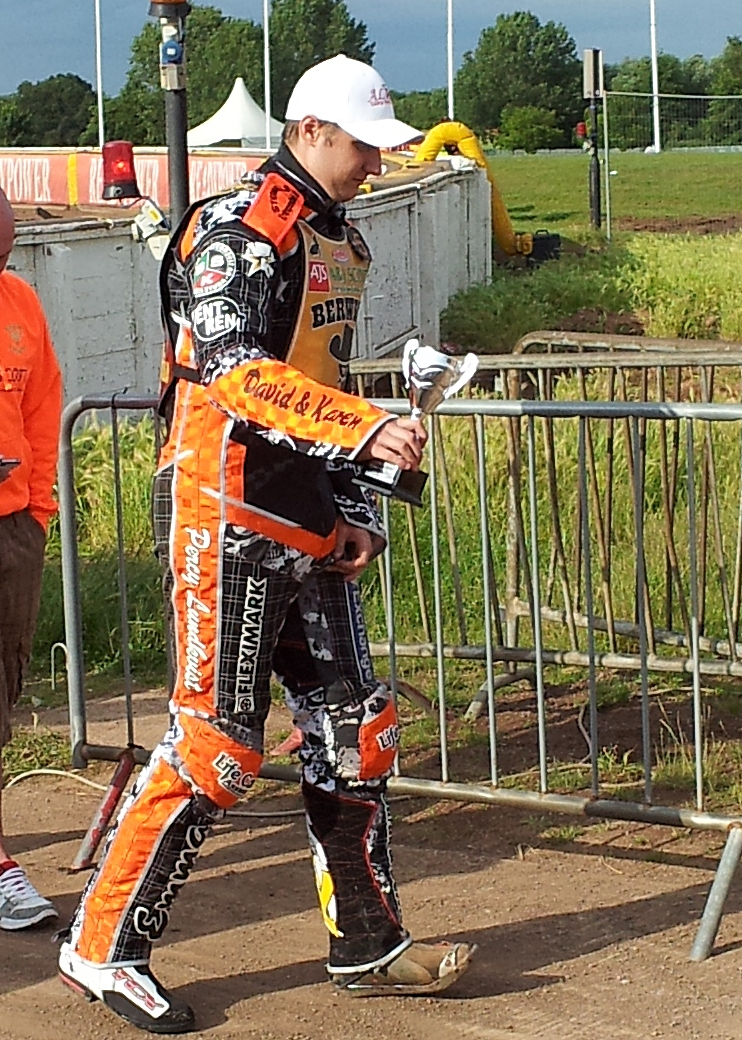
- Born: 20 January 1991 (age 35); Eskilstuna, Sweden
- Nationality: Swedish

Career history

Sweden
- 2010: Hammarby
- 2015: Griparna
- 2016: Smederna

Great Britain
- 2011, 2012-2015: Berwick Bandits
- 2013: Leicester Lions

Denmark
- 2015: Fjelsted

Alexander Edberg (born 20 January 1991) is a Swedish former speedway rider.

== Career ==
Born in Eskilstuna, Edberg took up speedway at the age of fifteen.

In Sweden, Edberg has had team places for Hammarby, with whom he won promotion to the Elitserien in 2010, Smederna, Tigrarna and Griparna. His began his British league career with Berwick Bandits in May 2011, replacing the injured Hynek Stichauer, but was himself injured in a crash in July in which he suffered a broken collarbone, a chipped bone in his back, a punctured lung and broken ribs. He returned to the Bandits team in 2012, and was an unused reserve in their Premier League Fours victory that year, but lost his place when they signed Edward Kennett in May 2013, signing for Leicester Lions shortly afterwards.

Edberg rode for Fjelsted in Denmark, KMŻ Lublin in Poland, and Keittiöpiste Kuusankoski and Haukat/Royals Lahti in Finland.

Mid-way through the 2015 season, Edberg left the Berwick team to return home.

In 2024, Edberg joined Rospiggarna as the club manager.
