= Russia national under-19 speedway team =

Russia
- Association: Motorcycle Federation of Russia
- FIM code: MFR

European Championships
Team U-19	1	0	0
Individual U-19	—	—	1
- Best result: 3rd place (2008)

The Russia national under-19 speedway team is the national under-19 speedway team of Russia and is controlled by the Motorcycle Federation of Russia. The team has never qualify to the Team Speedway Junior European Championship final. In the Individual competition was won one bronze medal: Artem Vodyakov (2008).

Due to the 2022 Russian invasion of Ukraine, on March 6, 2022, the Fédération Internationale de Motocyclisme banned all Russian and Belarusian motorcycle riders, teams, officials, and competitions.

== Competition ==
Team Speedway Junior European Championship
Year	Venue	Place	Pts.	Riders
2008	—	—	—	2nd placed in the Semi-Final Two; Artem Laguta (15), Artem Vodyakov (8), Oleg Beschastnov (8)
2009	—	—	—	withdrew and was replaced by Finland
2010				

Individual Speedway Junior European Championship
Year	Venue	Medal(s)	Riders
1998	(Slovenia) Krško	—	—
1999	(Poland) Gniezno	—	—
2000	(Slovenia) Ljubljana	—	Renat Gafurov (8th)
2001	(Czech Republic) Pardubice	—	Renat Gafurov (16th), Denis Gizatullin (track reserve)
2002	(Latvia) Daugavpils	—	Denis Gizatullin (7th)
2003	(Germany) Pocking	—	Maxim Kalimullin (14th)
2004	(Poland) Rybnik	—	—
2005	(Czech Republic) Mšeno	—	Emil Sayfutdinov disqualified
2006	(Croatia) Goričan	—	—
2007	(Poland) Częstochowa	—	Artem Laguta (7th)
2008	(Germany) Stralsund	3rd	Artem Vodyakov (3rd), Denis Nosov (15th)
2009	(Poland) Tarnów	—	Artem Laguta (4th)
2010	(Croatia) Goričan		

== See also ==
- Russia national speedway team
- Russia national under-21 speedway team
