= FIM Europe =

Motorcycle sports organisation

- Sport: Motorcycling
- Jurisdiction: Europe
- Founded: 1995; 31 years ago
- Affiliation: FIM
- Affiliation date: 1997
- Headquarters: Rome, Italy
- President: Martin de Graaff

Official website
- www.fim-europe.com
- (Europe)

FIM Europe (Formerly the Union Européenne de Motocyclisme (UEM) or European Motorcycle Union) is the FIM-affiliated organisation responsible for motorcycle sport within Europe.

In response to the 2022 Russian invasion of Ukraine, FIM Europe suspended the issuance of FIM/FIM Europe licences (and those FIM/FIM Europe licences already distributed) to both the Motorcycle Federation of Russia (MFR) and the Belarusian Federation of Motorcycle Sport (BFMS). FIM Europe also suspended the functions of people from MFR and BFMS acting as FIM/FIM Europe officials and as members/experts/agents of the FIM/FIM Europe, banned Russian and Belarusian riders, teams, and officials from taking part in FIM/FIM Europe events and activities, suspended the registration of and cancelled all FIM/FIM Europe events (such as meetings, races, and prize events) taking place in Russia and Belarus, and interrupted any other FIM/FIM Europe activities (including but not limited to seminars, commissions meetings, and training camps) taking place in Russia or Belarus.

== History ==
UEM logo

On 5 September 1995, a meeting of representatives of seven national European motorcycle sport bodies took place in Munich, Germany. The goal of this meeting was to create a controlling body for motorcycling after the model of other continental organizations. Representatives from France, Italy, Switzerland, Greece, Slovakia, Portugal, and Germany were present. With input from the Fédération Internationale de Motocyclisme, a declaration of intent was adopted. This document stated the goals of the new organisation as being: to promote, develop and help spread motorcycling and its diverse sports amongst the constituent nations of the European Union. With a further meeting on 27 November 1995 in Bratislava, the national federations of Belarus, Bulgaria, Estonia, Hungary, Lithuania, and the Czech Republic all expressed an interest in joining the proposed union.

At a meeting in Paris on 17 February 1996 the "union Européenne de Motocyclisme" was created as a controlling body of 21 national federations. Two committees were brought into being, whose fields of application were the sport and/or promotion, tourism, security, and transport. The Union was officially recognised by the FIM in 1997 as a continental federation.

At an Extraordinary General Assembly held in November 2012, a motion was passed to rename the organisation to FIM Europe. This brought the name in line with the other Continental Unions.

As of December 2017, FIM Europe had 47 National Federations (FMNs) and 6 Regional Motorcycling Associations as members.

Due to the 2022 Russian invasion of Ukraine, on March 6, 2022, FIM banned all Russian and Belarusian motorcycle riders, teams, officials, and competitions.

== European Championships by FIM Europe ==
Sport	Competition name	Competing entities	First held	Current holder	Next	Held every
Speedway	Individual Speedway Junior European Championship (U-19)	Individuals	1998	(Poland) Bartosz Jaworski (2025)	2026	One year
Speedway	Individual Speedway European Championship	Individuals	2001	(Poland) Patryk Dudek (2025)	2026	One year
Speedway	European Pairs Speedway Championship	National Pairs	2004	Denmark (2025)	2026	One year
Speedway	Team Speedway Junior European Championship (U-24)	National Teams	2008	Poland (2026)	2027	One year
Speedway	European Under-24 Individual Speedway Cup (U-24)	Individuals	2026	(Norway) Mathias Pollestad (2026)	2027	One year

== Discontinued ==
Sport	Competition name	Competing entities	First held	Last	Held every
Speedway	European Under-21 Individual Speedway Championship	Individuals	1977	2020	One year
Speedway	Speedway Champions Cup	Individuals	1986	1993	One year
Speedway	European Speedway Club Champions' Cup	Clubs	1998	2011	One year

== See also ==
- 2009 UEM 500cc Sidecar Final
