= 2026 European Under 24 Team Speedway Championship =

European speedway competition

The 2026 European Under 24 Team Speedway Championship is the 19th Team Speedway Junior European Championship season. It was organised by the Fédération Internationale de Motocyclisme and was the second time that the event had an age limit of under 24 years of age.

The qualifying round was held at the Svítkov Stadium in Pardubice on 6 June. Sweden won the qualifier with 39 points, Young Europe (28), Slovenia (27) and Czech Republic (26) were all eliminated.

The final took place in Poland for the seventh time since 2008, on 22 August 2026 at the Grudziądz Speedway Stadium and was won by Poland for eight time in a row.

== Results ==
=== Qualifying Round ===
- Svítkov Stadium in Pardubice, Czech Republic
- 6 June

Pos.	National team	Pts.	Scorers
1	Sweden	39	Casper Henriksson 14, Noel Wahlquist 10, Avon Van Dyck 10, Ludvig Selvin 5
2	(European Union) Young Europe	28	Patrick Hyjek 9, Sebastian Kössler 6, Zoltan Lovas 5, Carlos Gennerich 5, Damirs Filimonovs 3
3	Slovenia	27	Anže Grmek 10, Sven Cerjak 10, Gregor Zorko 5, Tilen Bračko 2
4	Czech Republic	26	Adam Bubba Bednář 15, Daniel Klíma 7, Adam Nejezchleba 4, Bruno Belan 0, Jan Jeníček 0

=== Final ===
- Grudziądz Speedway Stadium in Grudziądz, Poland
- 26 July

Pos.	National team	Pts.	Scorers
1	Poland	45	Maksymilian Pawełczak 14, Mateusz Cierniak 14, Bartłomiej Kowalski 9, Kevin Małkiewicz 8, Bartosz Bańbor 0
2	Denmark	44	Villads Nagel 13, Mikkel Andersen 13, Bastian Pedersen 9, William Drejer 6, Jacob Jensen 3
3	Great Britain	19	Leon Flint 10, William Cairns 3, Cooper Rushen 3, Dan Thompson 2, Luke Harrison 1
4	Sweden	12	Casper Henriksson 5, Avon Van Dyck 5, Noel Wahlquist 2, Harry Lundahl 0

== See also ==
- 2026 World Junior Team Championship
- 2026 European Under-19 Individual Speedway Championship
- 2026 European Under-24 Individual Speedway Cup
