= 2025 European Under-19 Individual Speedway Championship =

European motorcycle speedway event

- Start date: 3 May
- End date: 23 August

Champion
- Bartosz Jaworski

The 2025 European Under-19 Individual Speedway Championship was the 25th edition of the European Under-19 Individual Speedway Championship.

Heats were held on 18 April at the Svítkov Stadium in Pardubice, Czechia, and on 3 May at the Speedway Žarnovica in Žarnovica, Slovakia. Defending champion and event favourite Nazar Parnitskyi won his semi-final but could not compete in the final due to other commitments.

The final was staged at the Grudziądz Speedway Stadium in Poland on 23 August 2025.

The title was won by Bartosz Jaworski and the first three positions went to Polish riders.

== Final ==
- 23 August 2025
- (Poland) Grudziądz Speedway Stadium

Pos.	Rider	Points
1	(Poland) Bartosz Jaworski	14
2	(Poland) Kevin Małkiewicz	13+3
3	(Poland) Bartosz Bańbor	13+2
4	(Denmark) Mikkel Andersen	12
5	(Czech Republic) Adam Bednář	12
6	(Denmark) Villads Nagel	10
7	(Poland) Szymon Ludwiczak	8
8	(Poland) Franciszek Karczewski	7
9	(Sweden) Rasmus Karlsson	7
10	(Poland) Kacper Mania	7
11	(Hungary) Zoltan Lovas	6
12	(Finland) Otto Raak	5
13	(Poland) Jan Przanowski (res)	2
14	(Sweden) Alfons Wiltander	2
15	(Latvia) Damirs Filimonovs	2
16	(Norway) Magnus Klipper	1
17	(Poland) Oskar Paluch	0

== See also ==
- 2025 Speedway European Championship
