= 2008 Elite League speedway season =

British motorcycle speedway season

- League: Sky Sports Elite League
- Champions: Poole Pirates
- Knockout Cup: Eastbourne Eagles
- Craven Shield: Coventry Bees
- Elite Shield: Swindon Robins
- Individual: Jason Crump
- Pairs: Coventry Bees
- Highest average: Leigh Adams
- Division/s below: 2008 Premier League; 2008 Conference

The 2008 Elite League speedway season (also known as the Sky Sports Elite League for sponsorship reasons) was the 74th season of the top division of UK speedway and the 12th since its establishment as the Elite League. The first fixtures of the season took place on 29 March and the season ended on 27 October. The Coventry Bees were the defending champions from 2007.

== Summary ==
New rules introduced for 2008 included three points for an away win compared to two points in 2007, and the removal of the bonus point, in which a team was awarded an extra point for an aggregate win over home and away matches against another team. Also new in 2008 was a relegation and promotion playoff between an Elite League team and a Premier League team. The two teams that finish bottom of the Elite League will face in each other in a two legged playoff with the loser facing the Premier League playoff winner over two legs.

The Poole Pirates finished top of the league table, with the Lakeside Hammers, Swindon Robins and Ipswich Witches occupying the other championship playoff places. Poole and Lakeside progressed to the grand final of the playoffs, with Poole winning the first leg at Lakeside 42–48, and the second leg at Poole 60–33, giving them a 108–75 victory. The Poole Pirates were crowned with their third Elite League title, and fifth championship overall. Wolverhampton faced Premier League team the Edinburgh Monarchs in the relegation/promotion playoff final, with Wolverhampton winning comfortably over the two legs with a 106–76 aggregate victory, and thus avoided relegation. Poole still had Magnus Zetterström, Bjarne Pedersen and Daniel Davidsson in their team, who were all members of the famous double double winners of 2004. They had since recruited Chris Holder, Davey Watt, Adam Skórnicki and Freddie Eriksson, who all made significant contributions for the Poole team.

Jason Crump had left Poole for Belle Vue at the beginning of the season and missed out on a league title. Crump and fellow Australian Leigh Adams were victims of their own success, the pair had been the stand out riders for several seasons but they were so good that the league averages created problems for teams when assembling a side to adhere to the league's points limit allowance. Consequently, teams had to decide whether to retain the rider or move them on, in the case of Adams, Swindon kept him but found it hard to bring in new signings to support him.

== League table ==
Key:
Competition playoffs
Relegation playoffs

Pos	Club	M	Home			Away			F	A	+/-	Pts
Pos	Club	M	W	D	L	W	D	L	F	A	+/-	Pts
1	Poole Pirates	32	14	0	2	8	0	8	1600	1321	+279	52
2	Lakeside Hammers	32	15	0	1	7	1	8	1551	1375	+176	52
3	Swindon Robins	32	12	2	2	5	0	11	1498	1434	+64	41
4	Ipswich Witches	32	11	1	4	5	2	9	1483	1439	+44	40
5	Eastbourne Eagles	32	11	0	5	4	0	12	1462	1472	-10	34
6	Coventry Bees	32	10	2	4	2	1	13	1418	1506	-88	29
7	Belle Vue Aces	32	13	0	3	0	2	14	1423	1491	-68	28
8	Peterborough Panthers	32	12	1	3	1	0	15	1371	1528	-157	28
9	Wolverhampton Wolves	32	8	0	8	0	0	16	1341	1581	-240	16

Home: 3W = Home win by 7 points or more; 2W = Home win by between 1 and 6 points
Away: 4W = Away win by 7 points or more; 3W = Away win by between 1 and 6 points; 1L = Away loss by 6 points or less
M = Meetings; D = Draws; L = Losses; F = Race points for; A = Race points against; +/- = Race points difference; Pts = Total Points

== Results ==
Teams face each other four times: twice home and away. The first of the home and away meetings are called the 'A' fixtures, and the second are the 'B' fixtures.

A Fixtures

Home\Away	BV	COV	EAS	IPS	LH	PET	PP	SWI	WOL
Belle Vue Aces		46-43	42-48	52-38	47-43	52-41	50-43	42-51	60-30
Coventry Bees	45-45		43-47	52-37	41-49	48-42	48-45	52-41	48-45
Eastbourne Eagles	50-40	50-40		42-48	53-39	59-35	41-48	46-44	53-40
Ipswich Witches	52-41	50-43	51-39		42-51	60-31	41-51	43-50	53-38
Lakeside Hammers	54-39	63-29	48-45	51-42		56-37	48-45	50-45	53-40
Peterborough Panthers	47-45	51-38	48-42	49-41	36-36*		35-57	42-48	48-42
Poole Pirates	59-33	53-39	52-41	40-50	54-38	44-46		53-39	62-31
Swindon Robins	49-43	49-43	56-37	45-45	53-40	53-40	39-51		50-42
Wolverhampton Wolves	48-45	44-45	50-39	43-48	41-49	59-33	54-36	42-48	

* Meeting abandoned after heat 12. Result stands.

Last updated: September 11, 2008. Source: BSPA

Colours: Blue = home win; Red = away win; White = draw

Home team listed in the left-hand column

B Fixtures

Home\Away	BV	COV	EAS	IPS	LH	PET	PP	SWI	WOL
Belle Vue Aces		50-40	48-45	48-42	42-48	53-39	48-42	47-43	49-41
Coventry Bees	52-40		52-41	45-45	42-51	59-36	37-56	52-43	53-40
Eastbourne Eagles	56-37	46-47		41-49	49-44	46-44	41-52	50-43	63-27
Ipswich Witches	48-42	45-45	52-41		44-48	54-38	52-38	54-39	49-41
Lakeside Hammers	59-34	56-37	56-37	55-38		49-41	53-39	41-49	58-32
Peterborough Panthers	52-42	51-42	39-54	52-40	56-37		47-43	52-41	56-37
Poole Pirates	50-31*	54-36	60-33	59-34	50-42	54-36		58-35	55-37
Swindon Robins	45-45	51-39	53-39	49-44	53-39	49-44	42-51		62-29
Wolverhampton Wolves	48-45	47-43	45-48	40-52	43-47	54-38	44-46	47-46	

*Meeting abandoned after heat 13. Result stands.

Last updated: October 7, 2008. Source: BSPA

Colours: Blue = home win; Red = away win; White = draw

Home team listed in the left-hand column

== Championship Playoffs ==
Semi-finals

2008-09-29; 19:30	(Report)	Poole Pirates	59 – 33	Ipswich Witches	Wimborne Road, Poole; Referee(s): Dave Watters
Bjarne Pedersen 13+1	Kenneth Bjerre (guest) 11

2008-09-29; 19:30	(Report)	Lakeside Hammers	56 – 33	Swindon Robins	Arena Essex Raceway, Purfleet; Referee(s): Phil Griffin
Andreas Jonsson 15	Leigh Adams 14

Poole and Lakeside progressed to the grand final

Grand final

First leg

2008-10-06; 19:30	(Report)	Lakeside Hammers	42 – 48	Poole Pirates	Arena Essex Raceway, Purfleet; Referee(s): Chris Gay

Lakeside:
1	(Sweden) Andreas Jonsson (c)	(2,3,0,3,1',3,3)	15+1
2	(England) Leigh Lanham	(1',1,1,1,2)	6+1
3	Rider replacement
4	(Sweden) Jonas Davidsson	(1,3,2',2,2,0)	10+1
5	(Poland) Tomasz Jędrzejak	(0,2,1,3,2')	8+1
6	(Sweden) Ricky Kling	(1,0,1',1')	3+2
7	(Poland) Krzysztof Jabłoński	(0,1',0)	1+1
Manager:
(England) Jon Cook

Poole:
1	(Australia) Chris Holder	(3,2,2,0)	7
2	(Sweden) Magnus Zetterström	(0,0,3,1')	4+1
3	(Denmark) Bjarne Pedersen (c)	(2',2',3,3,2)	12+2
4	(Poland) Adam Skórnicki	(3,3,f,3,1')	10+1
5	(Australia) Davey Watt	(3,2,1,1)	7
6	(Sweden) Freddie Eriksson	(2',0,0)	2+1
7	(Sweden) Daniel Davidsson	(3,0,2',0,1')	6+1
Manager:
(England) Neil Middleditch

Second leg

2008-10-13; 19:30	Report	Poole Pirates	60 – 33 (108 – 75)	Lakeside Hammers	Wimborne Road, Poole; Referee(s): Tony Steele

Poole:
1	(Australia) Chris Holder	(3,3,3,0,3)	12
2	(Sweden) Magnus Zetterström	(2',1,3,2')	8+2
3	(Denmark) Bjarne Pedersen (c)	(3,3,3,3,2')	14+1
4	(Poland) Adam Skórnicki	(1,ex,1,2)	4
5	(Australia) Davey Watt	(3,1,2,2)	8
6	(Sweden) Freddie Eriksson	(2',0,1',1')	4+3
7	(Sweden) Daniel Davidsson	(3,2',2',1,2')	10+3
Manager:
(England) Neil Middleditch

Lakeside:
1	(England) Scott Nicholls (guest)	(1,ex,6^,3,1)	11
2	(England) Leigh Lanham (c)	(0,1,0)	1
3	Rider replacement
4	(Poland) Tomasz Jędrzejak	(0,2,1,1,3,0)	7+1
5	(Sweden) Jonas Davidsson	(2,1,2,2,3,1)	11
6	(Sweden) Ricky Kling	(0,ex,0,0)	0
7	(Poland) Krzysztof Jabłoński	(1,0,2,0,0,ex)	3
Manager:
(England) Jon Cook

Poole win 108-75 on aggregate and are the 2008 Elite League Champions.

== Relegation playoffs ==
Semi-finals

2008-10-14; 19:30	Report	Wolverhampton Wolves	48 – 47	Peterborough Panthers	Monmore Green Stadium, Wolverhampton
Niels Kristian Iversen 11	Rory Schlein 14+1

2008-10-16; 19:30	Peterborough Panthers	67 – 23	Wolverhampton Wolves	East of England Showground, Peterborough; Referee(s): Jim Lawrence
Karol Zabik 14+1	Jesper B. Monberg 7

Peterborough win 114-71 on aggregate. Wolverhampton will face the Premier League playoff winners, the Edinburgh Monarchs, over two legs.

Final

2008-10-24; 19:30	Report	Edinburgh Monarchs	37 – 53	Wolverhampton Wolves	Armadale Stadium, Armadale, West Lothian; Referee(s): Stuart Wilson
Ryan Fisher 14	Jesper B. Monberg 14

2008-10-27; 19:30	Report	Wolverhampton Wolves	53 – 38	Edinburgh Monarchs	Monmore Green Stadium, Wolverhampton; Referee(s): Jim Lawrence
Jesper B. Monberg 12	Ryan Fisher 16+1

Wolverhampton win 106–76 on aggregate and avoid relegation.

== Elite League Knockout Cup ==
The 2008 Elite League Knockout Cup was the 70th edition of the Knockout Cup for tier one teams. Eastbourne Eagles were the winners of the competition.

First round

Date	Team one	Score	Team two
07/04	Wolverhampton	54-38	Ipswich
03/04	Ipswich	50-42	Wolverhampton

Quarter-finals

Date	Team one	Score	Team two
23/06	Wolverhampton	52-40	Eastbourne
21/06	Eastbourne	62-30	Wolverhampton
20/06	Coventry	56-37	Belle Vue
20/06	Lakeside	50-42	Peterborough
19/06	Peterborough	39-51	Lakeside
19/06	Swindon	50-40	Poole
18/06	Poole	53-40	Swindon
16/06	Belle Vue	49-44	Coventry

Semi-finals

Date	Team one	Score	Team two
30/08	Eastbourne	54-39	Lakeside
13/08	Lakeside	52-41	Eastbourne
13/08	Poole	45-45	Coventry
11/08	Coventry	45-45	Poole

Final

First leg

25 October 2008

Eastbourne Eagles; Edward Kennett 12; Lee Richardson 12; Simon Gustafsson 9 Lewis Bridger 9 Cameron Woodward 8 Scott Nicholls 6 James Brundle 1	57 - 35	Poole Pirates; Bjarne Pedersen 12; Chris Holder 8 Magnus Zetterström 7 Freddie Eriksson 6 Davey Watt 2 Daniel Davidsson 0	Arlington Stadium

Second leg

26 October 2008	Poole Pirates; Chris Holder 12; Adam Skórnicki 9 Davey Watt 9 Bjarne Pedersen 5 Daniel Davidsson 4 Magnus Zetterström 3 Freddie Eriksson 3	45 - 45	Eastbourne Eagles; Scott Nicholls 12; Lee Richardson 11; Edward Kennett 8 Simon Gustafsson 5 Lewis Bridger 4 Cameron Woodward 4 James Brundle 0	Poole Stadium

The Eastbourne Eagles were declared Knockout Cup Champions, winning on aggregate 102-78.

== Craven Shield ==
North Group

Home \ Away	BV	COV	WOL
Belle Vue		50–42	49–41
Coventry	54–39		59–33
Wolverhampton	48–44	53–37	

Legend: Blue = home team win; Yellow = draw; Red = away team win.

South Group

Home \ Away	EAS	PP	SWI
Eastbourne		52–42	52–41
Poole	51–43		54–39
Swindon	48–42	46–44	

Legend: Blue = home team win; Yellow = draw; Red = away team win.

East Group

Home \ Away	IPS	LAK	PET
Ipswich		43–47	61–31
Lakeside	40–52		58–35
Peterborough	47–43	45–45	

Legend: Blue = home team win; Yellow = draw; Red = away team win.

Semi-final

Team one	Team two	Score
Poole	Coventry	58–34, 32–58

Final

Team one	Team two	Score
Lakeside	Coventry	43–47, 35–58

== Riders' Championship ==
The Elite League Riders Championship involves the riders with the highest average from each club competing in the Elite League. It took place on 8 October 2008, at the Premier League track at Birmingham after the original staging of the event on 20 August was abandoned due to bad weather.

Format The top 15 highest averaged riders in the Elite League plus one wild card and two reserves take part, although no more than two riders from each club participate. There are 20 qualifying heats, a 'last chance' qualifying heat and a final. The top two scorers from the 20 qualifying heats qualify directly for the final. The next top four scorers take place in the last chance qualifying heat, with the 1st and 2nd place riders from that heat also qualifying to the final.

Result

- 2008-10-08, Perry Barr Stadium
- Changes:
  - (5) (Poland) Jarosław Hampel (IPS) → Janniro (COV)
  - (6) (United Kingdom) Lee Richardson (EAS) → Kennett
  - (8) (United Kingdom) Chris Harris (COV) → Bjerre (PET)
  - (10) (United Kingdom) Scott Nicholls (EAS) → Batchelor (SWI)
  - (11) (Australia) Adam Shields (LH) → Davidsson
  - (12) (Denmark) Bjarne Pedersen (PP) → Watt
  - (13) (Denmark) Mads Korneliussen (SWI) → King (PET)
  - (14) (Sweden) Andreas Jonsson (LH) → Schlein (IPS)
  - (15) (Denmark) Hans N. Andersen (PET) → Bridger (EAS)

Placing	Rider	Total	1	2	3	4	5	6	7	8	9	10	11	12	13	14	15	16	17	18	19	20	Pts	Pos	21	22
1	(Australia) (2) Jason Crump (BV)	12	3					2				1				3				3			12	3	2	3
2	(Australia) (14) Rory Schlein (IPS)	10				3		1					1		3							2	10	5	3	2
3	(Denmark) (8) Kenneth Bjerre (PET)	13		3						2			3			2			3				13	2		1
4	(Australia) (4) Leigh Adams (SWI)	13	1							3				3				3				3	13	1		0
5	(Australia) (1) Chris Holder (PP)	11	2				3				3				1				2				11	4	1	
6	(Australia) (12) Davey Watt (PP)	10			2					1		2			2						3		10	6	0	
7	(United Kingdom) (15) Lewis Bridger (EAS)	8				2			2			3						0	1				8	7		
8	(Denmark) (16) Niels K. Iversen (WOL)	7				1				0	2						2			2			7	8		
9	(United Kingdom) (13) Daniel King (PET)	7				E	2							2		1					2		7	9		
10	(Sweden) (3) Fredrik Lindgren (WOL)	6	0						0				2				3				1		6	10		
11	(Poland) (7) Piotr Świderski (IPS)	5		0					3					1	0					1			5	11		
12	(Sweden) (11) Jonas Davidsson (LH)	5			3				1		0					0						1	5	12		
13	(Australia) (10) Troy Batchelor (SWI)	5			1			3						0			1		0				5	13		
14	(United Kingdom) (6) Edward Kennett (EAS)	4		1				0			1							2			0		4	14		
15	(United States) (5) Billy Janniro (COV)	2		2			0					0					0					-	2	15		
16	(Denmark) (9) Charlie Gjedde (BV)	2			0		1						0					1		0			2	16		
17	(17) Jay Herne (res)	0																				0	0	17		
Placing	Rider	Total	1	2	3	4	5	6	7	8	9	10	11	12	13	14	15	16	17	18	19	20	Pts	Pos	21	22

m - exclusion for exceeding two minute time allowance • t - exclusion for touching the tapes • x - other exclusion • e - retired or mechanical failure • f - fell • ns - non-starter • nc - non-classify

gate A - inside	gate B	gate C	gate D - outside

== Pairs ==
The Elite League Pairs Championship was held in Swindon on 17 August and was won by Coventry Bees. The original date had been set for King's Lynn Stadium on 5 April but was postponed.

Pos	Team	Pts	Riders
1	Swindon	26	Adams 16, Korneliussen 10
2	Belle Vue	25	Crump 15, Gjedde 10
3	Coventry	23	Andersen 14, Harris 9
4	Ipswich	21	Swiderski 11, Schlein 10
5	Poole	20	Pedersen B 11, Holder 9
6	Wolves	15	Iversen 13, Lindgren 2
7	Peterborough	12	Bjerre 6, King 6
8	Eastbourne	11	Richardson 9, Woodward 2
9	Lakeside	9	Shields 9, Davidsson 0

Semi finals

- Swindon 5 Ipswich 4 - Schlein, Adams, Korneliussen, Swiderski
- Coventry 5 Belle Vue 4 - Crump, Andersen, Harris, Gjedde

Final

- Coventry 5 Swindon 4 - Korneliussen, Harris, Andersen, Adams

== Leading final averages ==
Rider	Team	Average
(Australia) Leigh Adams	Swindon	11.04
(Australia) Jason Crump	Belle Vue	10.94
(Sweden) Andreas Jonsson	Lakeside	9.98
(Denmark) Hans Andersen	Coventry	9.89
(England) Scott Nicholls	Eastbourne	9.58
(Denmark) Bjarne Pedersen	Poole	9.30
(Australia) Chris Holder	Poole	8.95
(Poland) Piotr Świderski	Ipswich	8.67
(England) Lee Richardson	Eastbourne	8.65
(Poland) Jarosław Hampel	Ipswich	8.55

== Riders & final averages ==
Belle Vue

- (Australia) Jason Crump 10.94
- (Denmark) Charlie Gjedde 8.41
- (Australia) Jason Lyons 7.36
- (England) Joe Screen 6.63
- (Australia) Kevin Doolan 5.90
- (Denmark) Patrick Hougaard 5.75
- (Sweden) Billy Forsberg 5.70
- (Poland) Łukasz Jankowski 5.14
- (Australia) Robert Ksiezak 3.32
- (England) Nick Simmons 2.31
- (Denmark) Jonas Raun 1.96
- (Poland) Michał Rajkowski 1.91

Coventry

- (Denmark) Hans Andersen 9.89 (15 matches)
- (England) Chris Harris 8.35
- (England) Simon Stead 7.59
- (Australia) Rory Schlein 7.37
- (England) Oliver Allen 6.97
- (United States) Billy Janniro 6.71
- (England) Ben Barker 5.42
- (Poland) Stanisław Burza 4.52
- (Czech Republic) Filip Šitera 4.13
- (Denmark) Andreas Messing 3.02

Eastbourne

- (England) Scott Nicholls 9.58
- (England) Lee Richardson 8.65
- (England) Edward Kennett 7.63
- (Australia) Cameron Woodward 6.72
- (England) Lewis Bridger 6.31
- (Sweden) Simon Gustafsson 4.93
- (England) James Brundle 2.24

Ipswich

- (Poland) Piotr Świderski 8.67
- (Poland) Jarosław Hampel 8.55
- (Australia) Rory Schlein 7.93
- (England) Chris Louis 6.81
- (Germany) Tobias Kroner 6.38
- (Australia) Steve Johnston 6.33
- (Poland) Robert Miśkowiak 6.18
- (England) Chris Schramm 4.27

Lakeside

- (Sweden) Andreas Jonsson 9.98
- (Australia) Adam Shields 8.57
- (Finland) Kauko Nieminen 7.73
- (Sweden) Jonas Davidsson 7.30
- (Finland) Joonas Kylmäkorpi 7.25
- (Poland) Tomasz Jędrzejak 7.00
- (England) Leigh Lanham 6.72
- (Sweden) Ricky Kling 5.70
- (Czech Republic) Luboš Tomíček Jr. 5.38
- (Poland) Krzysztof Jabłoński 2.00

Peterborough

- (Denmark) Hans Andersen 9.45 (22 matches)
- (Denmark) Kenneth Bjerre 8.08
- (Australia) Ryan Sullivan 7.67
- (Czech Republic) Karol Ząbik 6.96
- (England) Danny King 6.49
- (Denmark) Henning Bager 6.05
- (Czech Republic) Lukáš Dryml 5.78
- (Denmark) Claus Vissing 5.46
- (Denmark) Morten Risager 5.32
- (Australia) Ty Proctor 4.48
- (Denmark) Henrik Møller 2.46
- (Czech Republic) Zdeněk Simota 2.11

Poole

- (Denmark) Bjarne Pedersen 9.30
- (Australia) Chris Holder 8.95
- (Australia) Davey Watt 8.30
- (Poland) Krzysztof Kasprzak 7.89
- (Sweden) Magnus Zetterström 7.29
- (Poland) Adam Skórnicki 7.11
- (Sweden) Freddie Eriksson 6.05
- (Sweden) Daniel Davidsson 5.36
- (Poland) Karol Ząbik 5.18
- (Poland) Zbigniew Suchecki 4.10

Swindon

- (Australia) Leigh Adams 11.04
- (Croatia) Jurica Pavlic 8.16
- (Denmark) Mads Korneliussen 7.38
- (Australia) Troy Batchelor 7.12
- (Sweden) Sebastian Aldén 5.53
- (England) James Wright 5.52
- (Australia) Travis McGowan 5.06
- (Austria) Manuel Hauzinger 3.11
- (Netherlands) Theo Pijper 2.80

Wolverhampton

- (Sweden) Freddie Lindgren 8.52
- (Denmark) Niels Kristian Iversen 8.46
- (England) David Howe 6.01
- (Denmark) Jesper B. Monberg 5.85
- (Czech Republic) Aleš Dryml Jr. 5.67
- (Germany) Christian Hefenbrock 5.14
- (Denmark) Morten Risager 4.91
- (Denmark) Nicolai Klindt 4.90
- (Denmark) Kenneth Hansen 4.32
- (Sweden) Ludvig Lindgren 2.72

== See also ==
- Speedway in the United Kingdom
- List of United Kingdom Speedway League Champions
- Knockout Cup (speedway)
