= 2002 World Junior Championships =

2002 World Junior Championships may refer to:

- Athletics: 2002 World Junior Championships in Athletics
- Figure skating: 2002 World Junior Figure Skating Championships
- Ice hockey: 2002 World Junior Ice Hockey Championships
- Motorcycle speedway: 2002 Individual Speedway Junior World Championship

== See also ==
- 2002 World Cup
- 2002 Continental Championships (disambiguation)
- 2002 World Championships (disambiguation)
