= Zbigniew Czerwiński (speedway rider) =

Polish speedway rider

- Born: November 18, 1982 (age 44); Poland
- Nationality: Polish

Career history
- 1999–2001, 2003–2004: Częstochowa
- 2002, 2005–2006, 2009: Rybnik
- 2007, 2010: Ostrów
- 2008: Rivne
- 2012: Toruń

Individual honours
- 2000 - 3rd place: U-19 European Championship
- 2003 - 3rd place: U-21 Polish Championship

Team honours
- 2003: Team Polish Champion

Zbigniew Czerwiński (born November 18, 1982, in Poland) is a Polish former speedway rider who is a medalist of 2000 Individual U-19 European Championship and 2003 Team Polish Champion.

== Career ==
Czerwiński's last season in the Team Speedway Polish Championship was with KS Toruń in 2012.

== Results ==
- Individual U-19 European Championship
  - 2000 (Slovenia) Ljubljana - Bronze medal (11+3 points)
  - 2001 (Czech Republic) Pardubice - 6th place (9 points)
- European Pairs Championship
  - 2008 (Austria) Natschbach-Loipersbach - The Final will be on 2008-09-20 (6 points in Semi-Final)
- Individual U-21 Polish Championship
  - 2003 Rybnik - Bronze medal
- Team Polish Championship
  - 2003 - Polish Champion (with Włókniarz Częstochowa)
  - 2004 - Bronze medal (with Włókniarz Częstochowa)
- Polish Bronze Helmet (U-19)
  - 2001 Gorzów Wlkp. - 3rd place

== See also ==
- Speedway in Poland
