= Tournament in Łukasz Romanek Memory =

The Tournament in Łukasz Romanek Memory (Polish: Turniej Pamięci Łukasza Romanka) is an annual motorcycle speedway event held each year organized by the RKM Rybnik. The Tournament held in the Municipal Stadium in Rybnik, Poland. It is named after Łukasz Romanek (1983–2006), a speedway rider who won the 2001 Individual Under-19 European Champion and 2003 Individual Under-21 Polish Champion titles. Romanek hang oneself in June 2006.

== Podium ==
Year	Winner	Runner-up	3rd place
2007 details	(Sweden) Andreas Jonsson; Polonia Bydgoszcz	(Poland) Piotr Protasiewicz; Kronopol Zielona Góra	(Poland) Rafał Dobrucki; Marma Polskie Folie Rzeszów
2008 details	(United States) Greg Hancock; Złomrex Włókniarz Częstochowa	(Poland) Rafał Dobrucki; Kronopol Zielona Góra	(Poland) Sebastian Ułamek; Złomrex Włókniarz Częstochowa
2009 details	(Poland) Piotr Protasiewicz; Falubaz Zielona Góra	(Russia) Emil Sayfutdinov; Polonia Bydgoszcz	(Poland) Rafał Dobrucki; Falubaz Zielona Góra
2010 details	(Denmark) Nicki Pedersen; Caelum Stal Gorzów	(Poland) Tomasz Gollob; Caelum Stal Gorzów	(Poland) Rune Holta; Włókniarz Częstochowa
Year	Winner	Runner-up	3rd place

== See also ==
- motorcycle speedway
- RKM Rybnik
