= European Under-24 Individual Speedway Cup =

European motorcycle speedway competition

- Sport: motorcycle speedway
- Founded: 2026
- Continent: Europe

The European Under-24 Individual Speedway Cup is an individual motorcycle speedway competition organised by FIM Europe for riders under the age of 24. The competition was introduced in 2026 to provide additional international racing opportunities for junior riders over the age of 21 and to bridge the gap to senior international competition.

== Winners ==
Year	Venue	Winners	2nd place	3rd place
2026	(Hungary) Debrecen	(Norway) Mathias Pollestad (13 pts)	(Denmark) Villads Nagel (13 pts)	(Germany) Janek Konzack (12 pts)
