= 1987 Speedway Champions Cup =

The Speedway Champions Cup was an annual motorcycle speedway competition that took place between 1986 and 1993, featuring the national champions of the sixteen participating nations. It was discontinued with the introduction of the Speedway Grand Prix in 1995.

The 1987 championship was held at Miskolc and the winner was Zoltán Adorján from Hungary.

== Results ==
- August 2, 1987
- (Hungary) Miskolc

Placing	Rider	Total	1	2	3	4	5	6	7	8	9	10	11	12	13	14	15	16	17	18	19	20	Pts	Pos	21	22
1	(Hungary) (16) Zoltán Adorján	12				0				3	3						3			3			12	1		3
2	(Italy) (4) Armando Castagna	12	1							2				3				3				3	12	2		2
3	(United Kingdom) (15) Neil Evitts	11				3			3			X						2	3				11	3	3	
4	(Sweden) (8) Per Jonsson	11		3						0			3			3			2				11	4	2	
5	(Czech Republic) (13) Antonín Kasper, Jr.	11				1	3							2		2					3		11	5	1	
6	(Norway) (1) Arne Svendsen	10	3				1				2				3				1				10	6		
7	(West Germany) (12) Gerd Riss	9			3					1		3			F						2		9	7		
8	(East Germany) (2) Diethelm Trimer	7	2					3				0				1				1			7	8		
9	(Poland) (5) Wojciech Żabiałowicz	7		2			2					2					F					1	7	9		
10	(Austria) (11) Heinrich Schatzer	6			2				1		1					F						2	6	10		
11	(Soviet Union) (7) Valery Gordeev	5		1					2					E	E					2			5	11		
12	(Denmark) (14) Hans Peter Nielsen	4				2		E					2		E							0	4	12		
13	(Bulgaria) (3) Nikolai Manev	4	0						0				1				2				1		4	13		
14	(Finland) (10) Juha Moksunen	3			0			1						1			1		0				3	14		
15	(Socialist Federal Republic of Yugoslavia) (6) Artur Horvat	2		0				2			0							0			0		2	15		
16	(Netherlands) (9) Henk Stecman	2			1		0						0					1		0			2	16		
R1	(Hungary) (R1) Janosh Sceresh	0																					0	R1		
R2	(Hungary) (R2) Sandor Yheli	1										1											1	R2		
Placing	Rider	Total	1	2	3	4	5	6	7	8	9	10	11	12	13	14	15	16	17	18	19	20	Pts	Pos	21	22

m - exclusion for exceeding two minute time allowance • t - exclusion for touching the tapes • x - other exclusion • e - retired or mechanical failure • f - fell • ns - non-starter • nc - non-classify

gate A - inside	gate B	gate C	gate D - outside
