= Nick Simmons (speedway rider) =

British speedway rider

- Born: 24 July 1981 (age 45); Leamington Spa, Warwickshire
- Nationality: British (English)

Career history
- 1997–1999, 2002, 2006, 2009–2011: Isle of Wight Islanders
- 1998, 2004-2005: Exeter Falcons
- 1998–1999, 2001, 2007–2009: Newport Wasps
- 1999, 2003: Stoke Potters
- 2000: Arena Essex Hammers
- 2001, 2009: Somerset Rebels
- 2003: Mildenhall Fen Tigers
- 2004: Weymouth Wildcats
- 2005: Sittingbourne Crusaders
- 2008: Belle Vue Aces
- 2009: Scunthorpe Scorpions

Nicholas Steven John Simmons (born 24 July 1981) is a former motorcycle speedway rider from England.

== Speedway career ==
Simmons began his British career riding in the 1997 Speedway Conference League and then moved on to ride for Isle of Wight Islanders in 1998 and later became their club captain.

Simmons rode in the top tier of British Speedway riding for the Belle Vue Aces during the 2008 Elite League speedway season.

In 2023, Simmons undertooka 1,000 miles endurance challenge from Land's End to John O Groats in 24 hours.
