= 2025 European Team Speedway Championship =

European motorcycle speedway competition

- Start date: 10 May
- End date: 28 June

The 2025 European Team Speedway Championship was the fourth edition of the European motorcycle speedway team event to determine the team champions of Europe.

Poland with home advantage for the third time in four years, justified their tag of strong favourites once again by winning ahead of Denmark. The other two finalists Sweden and Ukraine were outclassed.

Great Britain chose not to compete in the competition again and Russia remained banned. Unfortunately the final only involved two current Grand Prix riders in Bartosz Zmarzlik and Mikkel Michelsen.

== Semi final A ==
- (Czech Republic) Svítkov Stadium, Pardubice, 10 May

Position	Team	Points	Riders
1	Denmark	57	Michael Jepsen Jensen 12; Mads Hansen 12; Mikkel Michelsen 11; Rasmus Jensen 11; Bastian Pedersen 11
2	Ukraine	38	Nazar Parnitskyi 17; Roman Kapustin 7 Marko Levishyn 7 Andriy Rozalu 5 Andriy Karpov 2
3	Czech Republic	22	Daniel Klíma 11; Jan Kvěch 6 Adam Bednář 4 Jan Macek 1 Václav Milík 0
4	France	12	Dimitri Bergé 6 Mathieu Trésarrieu 5 Tino Bouin 1 Mathias Trésarrieu 0

== Semi final B ==
- (Norway) Elgane Speedway, Elgane, 30 March

Position	Team	Points	Riders
1	Sweden	57	Victor Palovaara 15; Kim Nilsson 12; Casper Henriksson 11; Oliver Berntzon 10; Philip Hellström Bängs 9
2	Norway	37	Glenn Moi 12; Mathias Pollestad 8 Truls Kamhaug 8 Lasse Fredriksen 8 Magnus Klipper 1
3	Germany	21	Valentin Grobauer 6 Jonny Wynant 5 Richard Geyer 5 Patrick Hyjek 5
4	Latvia	17	Damir Filimonov 6 Nikita Kaulins 6 Artem Juhno 4 Ernest Matjuszonok 1

== Final ==
- (Poland) Zbigniew Podlecki Stadium, Gdańsk, 28 June

Position	Team	Points	Riders
1	Poland	50	Bartosz Zmarzlik 12; Patryk Dudek 12; Przemysław Pawlicki 10; Piotr Pawlicki Jr. 9 Wiktor Przyjemski 7
2	Denmark	43	Michael Jepsen Jensen 13; Frederik Jakobsen 13; Mikkel Michelsen 8 Rasmus Jensen 6 Bastian Pedersen 3
3	Sweden	30	Timo Lahti 12; Victor Palovaara 6 Kim Nilsson 6 Philip Hellström Bängs 3 Casper Henriksson 3
4	Ukraine	8	Nazar Parnitskyi 4 Marko Levishyn 3 Stanisław Melnyczuk 1 Roman Kapustin 0 Andrij Karpov 0

== See also ==
- 2025 Speedway European Championship
- 2025 European Pairs Speedway Championship
