= Daniel Davidsson =

Swedish speedway rider

- Born: 17 March 1983 (age 43); Motala, Sweden
- Nationality: Swedish

Career history

Sweden
- 2000, 2003: Smederna
- 2001: Örnarna
- 2002: Torshälla
- 2003: Team Bikab
- 2010: Vargarna
- 2011: Piraterna

Great Britain
- 2003–2004, 2006, 2008–2009: Poole Pirates
- 2005: Coventry Bees
- 2005: Peterborough Panthers
- 2010: Lakeside Hammers

Team honours
- 2003, 2004, 2008: Elite League
- 2006: Craven Shield
- 2003, 2004: Elite League KO Cup
- 2003: British League Cup
- 2001: Allsvenskan Winner

Daniel Jan Johan Davidsson (born 17 March 1983 in Motala, Sweden) is a former motorcycle speedway rider from Sweden.

== Career ==
Davidsson came to prominence after reaching the World Under 21 final in 2002 and 2004. In between the two finals, he signed for his first British team Poole Pirates for the 2003 Elite League speedway season and 2004 Elite League speedway season. The team completed two league and cup doubles during those years, although Davidsson was only really active for them in 2004.

Davidsson spent 2005 at Coventry Bees and Peterborough Panthers respectively, and sealed a third league title with Coventry during the 2005 Elite League speedway season. He returned to Poole in 2006 and 2008. After the 2009 season, he was transferred from Poole to Lakeside Hammers.

Davidsson reached three successive Swedish Individual Speedway Championships from 2008 to 2010.

In 2019, Davidsson was the team manager of Piraterna in the Elitserien.

== Family ==
Davidsson's brother, Jonas (born 1984), was also a speedway rider, as was his father Jan (born 1956).

== Career details ==
=== World Championships ===
- Individual U-21 World Championship
  - 2002 - (Czech Republic) Slaný - 16th place (1 point)
  - 2004 - (Poland) Wrocław - 16th place (1 point)

=== European Championships ===
- Individual European Championship
  - 2007 - 14th place in Semi-Final B
- Individual U-19 European Championship
  - 2001 - (Czech Republic) Pardubice - Bronze medal (13 points)
  - 2002 - (Latvia) Daugavpils - 10th place (6 points)
