= 1991 Speedway Champions Cup =

Motorcycle speedway competition

The Speedway Champions Cup was an annual motorcycle speedway competition that took place between 1986 and 1993, featuring the national champions of the sixteen participating nations. It was discontinued with the introduction of the Speedway Grand Prix in 1995.

The 1992 championship was held at Elgane and the winner was Lars Gunnestad from Norway.

== Results ==
- June 9, 1991
- (Norway) Elgane
