= Lamothe-Landerron =

French commune

- Commune
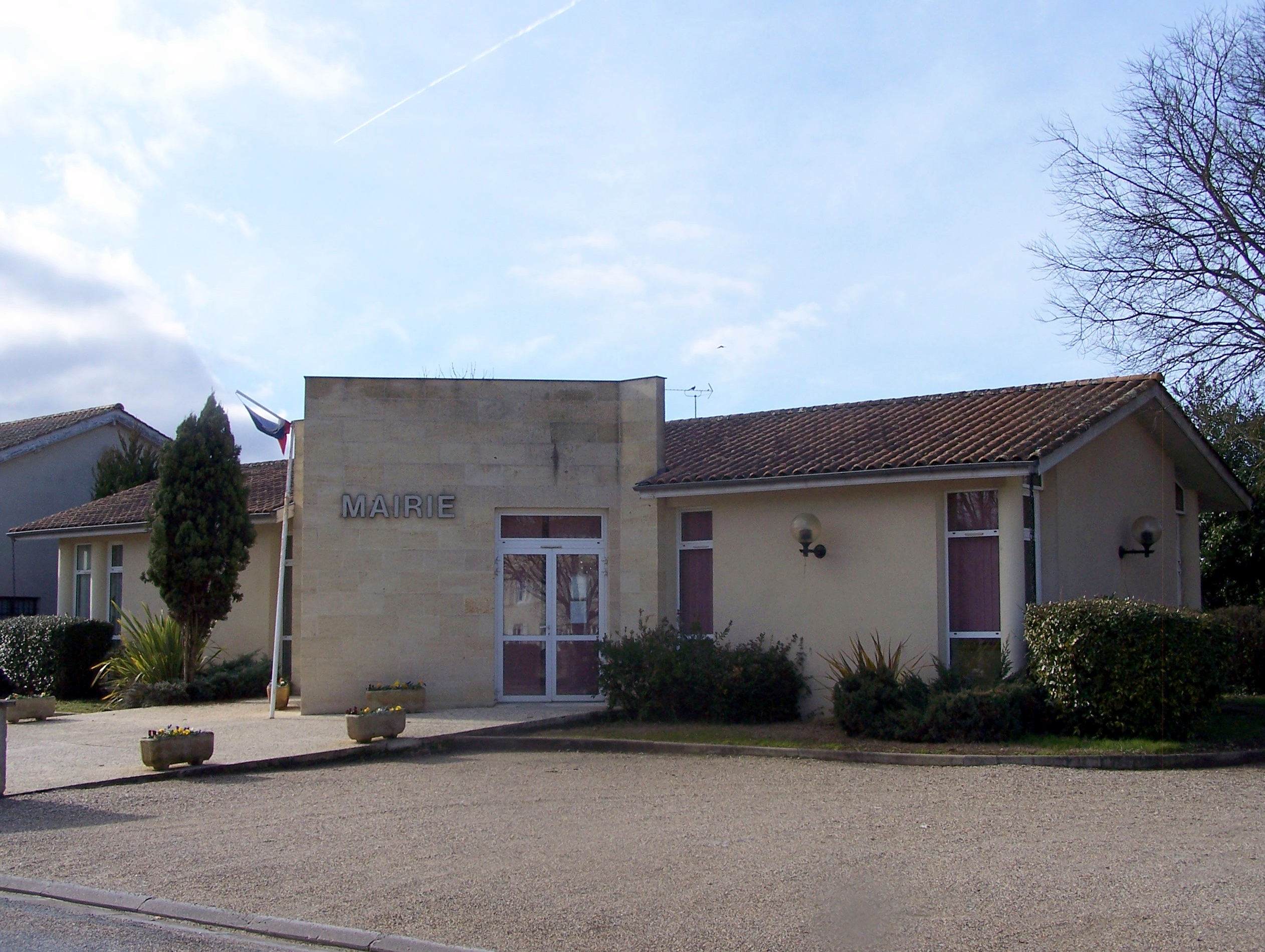
- The town hall in Lamothe-Landerron

- Coat of arms
- Location of Lamothe-Landerron
- Location within France Location within Nouvelle-Aquitaine
- Coordinates: 44°33′33″N 0°03′42″E
- Country: France
- Region: Nouvelle-Aquitaine
- Department: Gironde
- Arrondissement: Langon
- Canton: Le Réolais et Les Bastides

Government
  - Mayor (2021–2026): Sébastien Goudeneche
- Area^{1}: 9.18 km^{2} (3.54 sq mi)
- Elevation: 21 m (69 ft)
- Highest elevation: 106 m (348 ft)
- Lowest elevation: 15 m (49 ft)
- Population (2023): 1,114
  - Density: 121/km^{2} (314/sq mi)
- Time zone: UTC+01:00 (CET)
  - Summer (DST): UTC+02:00 (CEST)
- INSEE/Postal code: 33221 /33190
- ^{1} French Land Register data, which excludes lakes, ponds, glaciers > 1 km^{2} (0.386 sq mi or 247 acres) and river estuaries.

Lamothe-Landerron (French pronunciation: [lamɔt lɑ̃dɛʁɔ̃]; Occitan: La Mòta de Landeron) is a commune in the Gironde department in Nouvelle-Aquitaine in southwestern France. Lamothe-Landerron station has rail connections to Agen, Langon and Bordeaux.

== Population ==
Historical population
Year	Pop.	±% p.a.
1968	943	—
1975	950	+0.11%
1982	958	+0.12%
1990	1,003	+0.58%
1999	1,040	+0.40%
2007	1,083	+0.51%
2012	1,123	+0.73%
2017	1,226	+1.77%
2023	1,114	−1.58%
Source: INSEE

== Speedway ==
A motorcycle speedway track called the Piste de Speedway de Lamothe Landerron is located in Lamothe-Landerron on Le Bourg and La Garenne, off the D1113. It has held significant speedway events including qualifiers for the Speedway Grand Prix and European Speedway Championship since 2015, the most recent being the 2025 Speedway European Championship.

== See also ==
- Communes of the Gironde department
