= 1988 Speedway Champions Cup =

The Speedway Champions Cup was an annual motorcycle speedway event organized by the International Motorcycling Federation (FIM) between 1986 and 1993.

The 1988 event was held on August 14 in Krško, Slovenia, then part of Yugoslavia. The winner was Per Jonsson from Sweden.

Placing	Rider	Total	1	2	3	4	5	6	7	8	9	10	11	12	13	14	15	16	17	18	19	20	Pts	Pos	21
1	(Sweden) (13) Per Jonsson	14				3	2							3		3					3		14	1	
2	(West Germany) (11) Gerd Riss	13			2				3		3					2						3	13	2	3
3	(Hungary) (10) Zoltan Adorjan	13			3			3						2			3		2				13	3	2
4	(Austria) (15) Heinrich Schatzer	11				X			2			3						3	3				11	4	
5	(Sweden) (14) Per Sorensen	10				2		2					2		2							2	10	5	
6	(Czech Republic) (7) Antonín Kasper Jr.	9		2					E					1	3					3			9	6	
7	(Poland) (5) Zenon Kasprzak	9		3			3					1					1					1	9	7	
8	(Italy) (8) Valentino Furlanetto	8		E						3			3			1			1				8	8	
9	(Soviet Union) (3) Valery Gordeev	8	2						1				1				2				2		8	9	
10	(England) (1) Kelvin Tatum	6	3				1				2				0				0				6	10	
11	(Finland) (16) Ari Koponen	5				1				2	0						0			2			5	11	
12	(Socialist Federal Republic of Yugoslavia) (2) Zvonko Pavlič	4	0					1				2				0				1			4	12	
13	(Netherlands) (4) Henk Stechman	3	1							0				0				2				0	3	13	
14	(Bulgaria) (12) Nikolai Manev	3			E					1		0			1						1		3	14	
15	(Socialist Federal Republic of Yugoslavia) (9) Artur Horvat	2			1		0						0					1		0			2	15	
16	(Norway) (6) Tor Einar Hielm	2		1				0			1							0			0		2	16	
R1	(Socialist Federal Republic of Yugoslavia) (R1) Lazar Chaba	0																					0	R1	
R1	(Socialist Federal Republic of Yugoslavia) (R1) Martin Peterca	0																					0	R1	
Placing	Rider	Total	1	2	3	4	5	6	7	8	9	10	11	12	13	14	15	16	17	18	19	20	Pts	Pos	21

m - exclusion for exceeding two minute time allowance • t - exclusion for touching the tapes • x - other exclusion • e - retired or mechanical failure • f - fell • ns - non-starter • nc - non-classify

gate A - inside	gate B	gate C	gate D - outside
