= European Under-19 Individual Speedway Championship =

Annual European motorcycle speedway event

European Under-19 Individual Championship
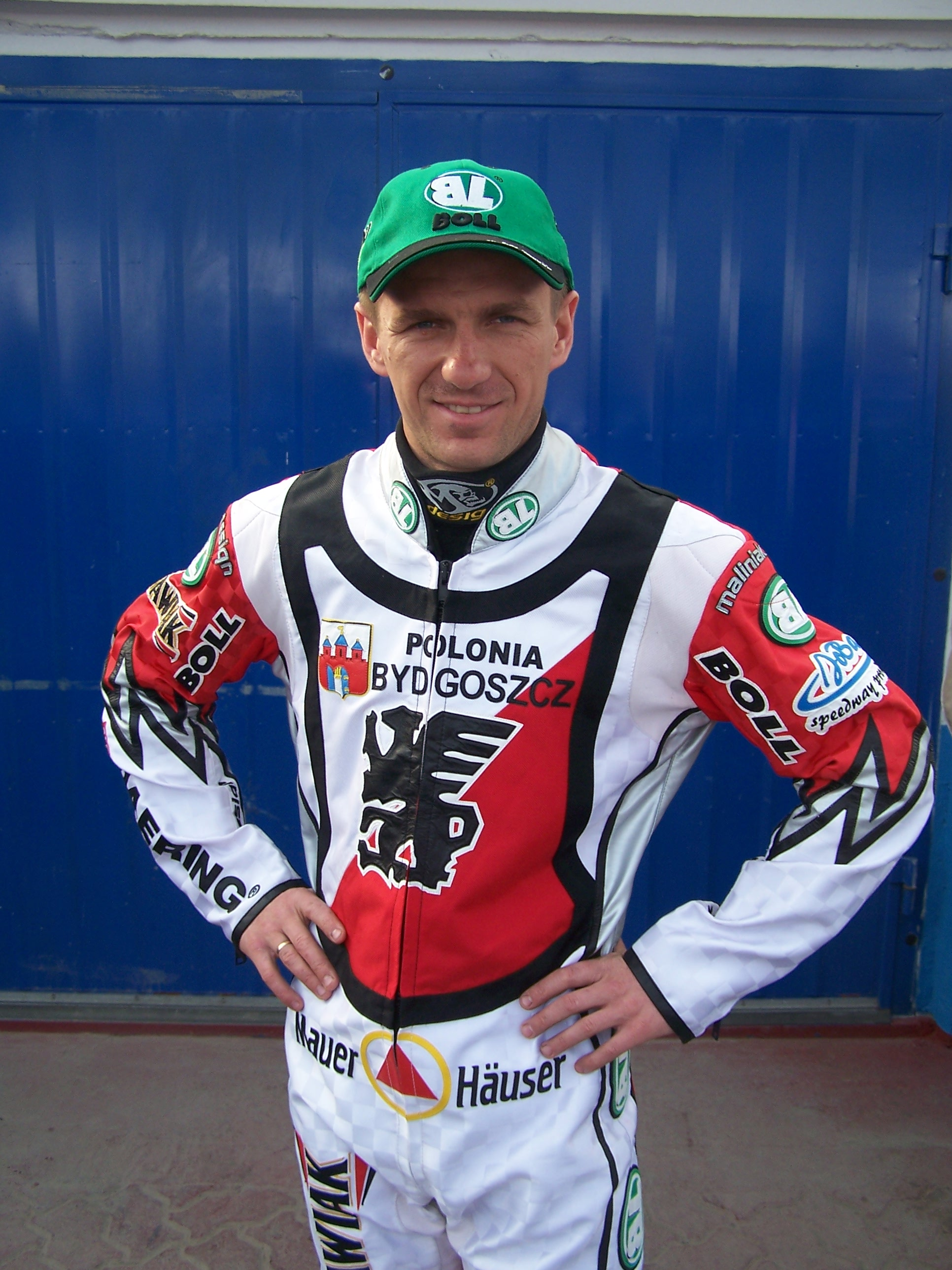
- Rafał Okoniewski 1998 and 1999 winner

The European Under-19 Individual Speedway Championship is an annual speedway event organised by FIM Europe (formerly the European Motorcycle Union (UEM)) since 1998.

== Championship history ==
The European Under-19 Championship was inaugurated in 1998, under the control of the European Motorcycle Union (UEM). Between 2013 and 2020, it was known as the European Under-21 Individual Speedway Championship, when it was expanded to include riders up to the age of 21 years of age.

The European Under-19 Championship returned in 2017 and was staged concurrently until the Under-21 event was discontinued in 2021.

== Past winners ==
Year	Venue	Winners	2nd place	3rd place
1998	(Slovenia) Krško	(Poland) Rafał Okoniewski	(Czech Republic) Aleš Dryml, Jr.	(Denmark) Hans N. Andersen
1999	(Poland) Gniezno	(Poland) Rafał Okoniewski	(Poland) Karol Malecha	(Poland) Jarosław Hampel
2000	(Slovenia) Ljubljana	(Czech Republic) Lukáš Dryml	(Denmark) Niels Kristian Iversen	(Poland) Zbigniew Czerwiński
2001	(Czech Republic) Pardubice	(Poland) Łukasz Romanek	(Poland) Rafał Kurmański	(Sweden) Daniel Davidsson
2002	(Latvia) Daugavpils	(Slovenia) Matej Žagar	(Denmark) Kenneth Bjerre	(Sweden) Fredrik Lindgren
2003	(Germany) Pocking	(Denmark) Kenneth Bjerre	(Poland) Janusz Kołodziej	(Sweden) Antonio Lindbäck
2004	(Poland) Rybnik	(Sweden) Antonio Lindbäck	(Poland) Karol Ząbik	(Denmark) Morten Risager
2005	(Czech Republic) Mšeno	(Poland) Karol Ząbik	(Latvia) Ķasts Poudžuks	(Sweden) Robert Pettersson
2006	(Croatia) Goričan	(Croatia) Jurica Pavlič	(Ukraine) Andriy Karpov	(Denmark) Lars Hansen
2007	(Poland) Częstochowa	(Denmark) Nicolai Klindt	(Croatia) Jurica Pavlič	(Czech Republic) Filip Šitera
2008	(Germany) Stralsund	(Poland) Artur Mroczka	(Poland) Maciej Janowski	(Russia) Artem Vodyakov
2009	(Poland) Tarnów	(Poland) Przemysław Pawlicki	(Poland) Maciej Janowski	(Slovakia) Martin Vaculík
2010	(Croatia) Goričan	(Sweden) Dennis Andersson	(Poland) Przemysław Pawlicki	(Poland) Patryk Dudek
2011	(Slovenia) Ljubljana	(Poland) Piotr Pawlicki, Jr.	(Denmark) Michael Jepsen Jensen	(Russia) Vitaly Belousov
2012	(Poland) Opole	(Poland) Bartosz Zmarzlik	(Poland) Tobiasz Musielak	(Denmark) Mikkel Michelsen
2013–2016	Not staged. Replaced by European Under-21 Individual Speedway Championship Main article: European Under-21 Individual Speedway Championship			
2017	(Czech Republic) Divišov	(England) Robert Lambert	(Sweden) Filip Hjelmland	(Poland) Bartosz Smektała
2018	(Finland) Varkaus	(Denmark) Mads Hansen	(Poland) Szymon Szlauderbach	(Latvia) Oļegs Mihailovs
2019	(Slovakia) Žarnovica	(Czech Republic) Jan Kvěch	(Russia) Evgeny Saidullin	(Denmark) Mads Hansen
2020	(Slovakia) Žarnovica	(Czech Republic) Jan Kvěch	(Denmark) Marcus Birkemose	(Czech Republic) Daniel Klíma
2021	(Latvia) Riga	(Latvia) Francis Gusts	(Sweden) Philip Hellström Bängs	(Poland) Mateusz Cierniak
2022	(Hungary) Nagyhalász	(Denmark) Jesper Knudsen	(Norway) Mathias Pollestad	(Sweden) Casper Henriksson
2023	(Poland) Gorzów	(Poland) Wiktor Przyjemski	(Poland) Damian Ratajczak	(Norway) Mathias Pollestad
2024	(Germany) Herxheim	(Ukraine) Nazar Parnitskyi	(Denmark) Bastian Pedersen	(Poland) Wiktor Przyjemski
2025	(Poland) Grudziądz	(Poland) Bartosz Jaworski	(Poland) Kevin Małkiewicz	(Poland) Bartosz Bańbor
