= Speedway Champions Cup =

International sporting competition

The Speedway Champions Cup was an annual motorcycle speedway event organized by the International Motorcycling Federation (FIM) between 1986 and 1993.

This competition featured the national champions of the top sixteen countries. It was held to give smaller speedway nations their own "World Final", but was scrapped with the introduction of the Speedway Grand Prix in 1995.

== Previous winners ==
Year	Venue	Winners	Runner-up	3rd place
1986	(Czechoslovakia) Pardubice	(Sweden) Erik Stenlund (14 pts)	(Soviet Union) Viktor Kuzniecov (13+3 pts)	(Czechoslovakia) Antonín Kasper, Jr. (13+2 pts)
1987	(Hungary) Miskolc	(Hungary) Zoltán Adorján (12 pts)	(Italy) Armando Castagna (12 pts)	(England) Neil Evitts (11 pts)
1988	(Socialist Federal Republic of Yugoslavia) Krško	(Sweden) Per Jonsson (14 pts)	(West Germany) Gerd Riss (13+3 pts)	(Hungary) Zoltán Adorján (13+2 pts)
1989	(Austria) Natschbach-Loipersbach	(Denmark) Jan O. Pedersen (15 pts)	(New Zealand) Mitch Shirra (13 pts)	(Finland) Kai Niemi (10 pts)
1990	(Italy) Lonigo	(Denmark) Hans Nielsen (14+3 pts)	(Hungary) Zoltán Adorján (14+2 pts)	(England) Simon Wigg (12 pts)
1991	(Norway) Elgane	(Norway) Lars Gunnestad (14 pts)	(Czechoslovakia) Antonín Kasper, Jr. (13 pts)	(Denmark) Hans Nielsen (12 pts)
1992	(Ukraine) Rivne	(Denmark) Gert Handberg (13 pts)	(Hungary) Zoltán Adorján (12 pts)	(Sweden) Peter Karlsson (10 pts)
1993	(Finland) Tampere	(Poland) Tomasz Gollob (13+3 pts)	(Australia) Leigh Adams (13+2 pts)	(Italy) Armando Castagna (13+1 pts)
Year	Venue	Winners	Runner-up	3rd place

== See also ==
- track racing
- Individual Speedway European Championship
