= Łukasz Romanek =

Polish speedway rider

- Born: 21 August 1983; Knurów, Poland
- Died: 2 June 2006 (aged 22); Wilcza, Poland
- Nationality: Polish

Career history

Poland
- 2000–2006: Rybnik

Great Britain
- 2006: Arena Essex

Individual honours
- 2001: U-19 European Champion
- 2003: U-21 Polish Championship

Team honours
- 2003: Polish Pairs U-21 Champion
- 2001: Team U-21 Polish Champion

Łukasz Romanek (born 21 August 1983 in Knurów, Poland – died 2 June 2006 in Wilcza, Poland) was a Polish motorcycle speedway rider.

== Career ==
Romanek won the title of Under-19 European Champion. He rode for Rybnik in the Team Speedway Polish Championship.

In 2006, Romanek joined the Arena Essex Hammers in Britain, for the 2006 season.

Romanek took his own life in June 2006.

== Results ==
=== Individual World U-21 Championship ===
- 2001 – 9th place (7 points)
- 2003 – track reserve (0 points)

=== Individual U-19 European Championship ===
- 2001 – European Champion (14 points)
- 2002 – 16th place (1 point)

=== Individual U-21 Polish Championship ===
- 2003 – Polish Champion

=== Polish U-21 Pairs Championship ===
- 2003 – Polish Champion

=== Team Polish Championship ===
- 2001 – 2nd place
- 2002 – 2nd place

=== Team U-21 Polish Championship ===
- 2001 – Polish Champion

=== Silver Helmet (U-21) ===
- 2004 – 3rd place

== See also ==
- Poland speedway team
- List of Speedway Grand Prix riders
- List of suicides (N–Z)
- Tournament in Łukasz Romanek Memory
