= 1989 Speedway Champions Cup =

Annual motorcycle speedway competition

The Speedway Champions Cup was an annual motorcycle speedway competition that took place between 1986 and 1993, featuring the national champions of the sixteen participating nations. It was discontinued with the introduction of the Speedway Grand Prix in 1995.

The 1989 championship was held at Speedway Natschbach-Loipersbach in Natschbach-Loipersbach and the winner was Jan O. Pedersen from Denmark.

== Results ==
- May 25, 1989
- (Austria) Speedway Natschbach-Loipersbach, Natschbach-Loipersbach

| Placing | Rider | Total | 1 | 2 | 3 | 4 | 5 | 6 | 7 | 8 | 9 | 10 | 11 | 12 | 13 | 14 | 15 | 16 | 17 | 18 | 19 | 20 | Pts | Pos |
|---|---|---|---|---|---|---|---|---|---|---|---|---|---|---|---|---|---|---|---|---|---|---|---|---|
| 1 | (Denmark) (10) Jan O. Pedersen | 15 | | | 3 | | | 3 | | | | | | 3 | | | 3 | | 3 | | | | 15 | 1 |
| 2 | (New Zealand) (2) Mitch Shirra | 13 | 2 | | | | | 2 | | | | 3 | | | | 3 | | | | 3 | | | 13 | 2 |
| 3 | (Finland) (9) Kai Niemi | 10 | | | 2 | | 3 | | | | | | 1 | | | | | 3 | | 1 | | | 10 | 3 |
| 4 | (England) (16) Simon Wigg | 9 | | | | 3 | | | | 3 | 3 | | | | | | E | | | 0 | | | 9 | 4 |
| 5 | (United States) (12) Sam Ermolenko | 9 | | | 1 | | | | | 0 | | 2 | | | 3 | | | | | | 3 | | 9 | 5 |
| 6 | (Czech Republic) (14) Roman Matoušek | 9 | | | | 0 | | 1 | | | | | 3 | | 2 | | | | | | | 3 | 9 | 6 |
| 7 | (Hungary) (7) Zoltan Adorjan | 9 | | 3 | | | | | 3 | | | | | 1 | 0 | | | | | 2 | | | 9 | 7 |
| 8 | (West Germany) (1) Klaus Lausch | 9 | 3 | | | | 1 | | | | 2 | | | | 1 | | | | 2 | | | | 9 | 8 |
| 9 | (Norway) (8) Lars Gunnestad | 8 | | 2 | | | | | | 1 | | | 2 | | | 2 | | | 1 | | | | 8 | 9 |
| 10 | (Soviet Union) (3) Vladimir Trofimov | 7 | 1 | | | | | | 2 | | | | 0 | | | | 2 | | | | 2 | | 7 | 10 |
| 11 | (Sweden) (15) Per Jonsson | 5 | | | | 2 | | | 1 | | | X | | | | | | 2 | 0 | | | | 5 | 11 |
| 12 | (Italy) (13) Armando Castagna | 5 | | | | 1 | 2 | | | | | | | 2 | | E | | | | | F | | 5 | 12 |
| 13 | (Bulgaria) (4) Nikolai Manev | 4 | 0 | | | | | | | 2 | | | | 0 | | | | 1 | | | | 1 | 4 | 13 |
| 14 | (Poland) (6) Zenon Kasprzak | 2 | | 0 | | | | 0 | | | 1 | | | | | | | 0 | | | 1 | | 2 | 14 |
| 15 | (Socialist Federal Republic of Yugoslavia) (11) Artur Horvat | 1 | | | 0 | | | | 0 | | 0 | | | | | 1 | | | | | | 0 | 1 | 15 |
| 16 | (Austria) (5) Heinrich Schatzer | 1 | | 1 | | | 0 | | | | | F | | | | | - | | | | | - | 1 | 16 |
| R1 | (Austria) (R1) Robert Funk | 3 | | | | | | | | | | | | | | | 1 | | | | | 2 | 3 | R1 |
| R2 | (Austria) (R2) Walter Nebel | 0 | | | | | | | | | | | | | | | | | | | | | 0 | R2 |
| Placing | Rider | Total | 1 | 2 | 3 | 4 | 5 | 6 | 7 | 8 | 9 | 10 | 11 | 12 | 13 | 14 | 15 | 16 | 17 | 18 | 19 | 20 | Pts | Pos |

m - exclusion for exceeding two minute time allowance • t - exclusion for touching the tapes • x - other exclusion • e - retired or mechanical failure • f - fell • ns - non-starter • nc - non-classify

| gate A - inside | gate B | gate C | gate D - outside |
