= 2002 World Championships =

2002 World Championships may refer to:

- Aquatics: 2002 FINA Short Course World Championships
- Athletics:
  - Cross-country running: 2002 IAAF World Cross Country Championships
  - Road running: 2002 IAAF World Half Marathon Championships
  - Paralympics: 2002 IPC Athletics World Championships
- Badminton: 2002 IBF World Championships
- Basketball:
  - 2002 FIBA World Championship
  - 2002 FIBA World Championship for Women
- Chess: FIDE World Chess Championship 2002
- Curling:
  - 2002 World Men's Curling Championship
  - 2002 World Women's Curling Championship
- Darts: 2002 BDO World Darts Championship
- Darts: 2002 PDC World Darts Championship
- Figure skating: 2002 World Figure Skating Championships
- Ice hockey: 2002 Men's World Ice Hockey Championships
- Ice hockey: 2002 Women's World Ice Hockey Championships
- Ringette: 2002 World Ringette Championships
- Softball: 2002 World Softball Championships
- Speed skating:
  - Allround: 2002 World Allround Speed Skating Championships
  - Sprint: 2002 World Sprint Speed Skating Championships
  - Single distances: 2002 World Single Distance Speed Skating Championships

== See also ==
- 2002 World Cup
- 2002 Continental Championships (disambiguation)
- 2002 World Junior Championships (disambiguation)
