= 2002 Continental Championships =

2002 Continental Championships may refer to:

== African Championships ==
- Football (soccer): 2002 African Cup of Nations

== Asian Championships ==
- Football (soccer): 2001–02 Asian Club Championship
- Multisport: 2002 Asian Games
- Swimming: 2002 Pan Pacific Swimming Championships

== European Championships ==
- Artistic gymnastics: 2002 European Rhythmic Gymnastics Championships
- Athletics: 2002 European Athletics Championships
- Figure skating: 2002 European Figure Skating Championships
- Football (soccer): 2001–02 UEFA Champions League
- Football (soccer): 2001–02 UEFA Cup
- Football (soccer): 2002 UEFA European Under-17 Championship
- Football (soccer): 2001–02 UEFA Women's Cup
- Volleyball: 2002–03 CEV Champions League
- Volleyball: 2002–03 CEV Women's Champions League

== Oceanian Championships ==
- Swimming: 2002 Oceania Swimming Championships

== Pan American Championships / North American Championships ==
- Cycling: 2002 Pan American Cycling Championships
- Football (soccer): 2002 CONCACAF Champions' Cup
- Football (soccer): 2002 CONCACAF Women's Gold Cup

== South American Championships ==
- Football (soccer): 2002 Copa Libertadores

== See also ==
- 2002 World Championships (disambiguation)
- 2002 World Junior Championships (disambiguation)
- 2002 World Cup
- Continental championship (disambiguation)
