= 2009 UEM 500cc Sidecar Final =

The 2009 UEM 500cc Sidecar Final was a grasstrack sidecar racing event held in Wimborne Minster, Dorset. The meeting took place in Pilford Farm, Uddens on Sunday 13 September 2009. It also incorporated The 2009 Wimborne Whoppa, which was the 40th anniversary of the event.

== The UEM 500cc Sidecar Final ==
=== Positions ===
Pos	Team
7	William Mattijssen/Nathalie Mattijssen
10	Thomas Kunert/Markus Elbi
3	Markus Brandhofer/Corinna Gunther
12	Sven Holstein/Desiree Daubert
6	Wilfried Detz/Danny Detz
2	Stefan Brandhofer/Stefan Peters
9	Shaun Harvey/Danny Hogg
8	Stefan Steigerwald/Sebastain Steigerwald
1	Marco Hundstrucker/Peter Schirmer
5	Markus Venus/Jennifer Van Dyke
11	Mike Read/Mark Hopkins
4.	Mark Detz/Jennifer Van Dyke
R1	Christophe Grenier/Erik Van Dyke
R2	Nick Radley/Abi Radley

== The 2009 Wimborne Whoppa ==
=== 500cc Solos ===
Pos	Number	Racer
1st	81	Lewis Denham
2nd	25	Charlie Saunders
3rd	6	Rob Finlow

=== 500cc Sidecars ===
Pos	Number	Team
1st	118	Scott Dunn/Natahsa Bartlett
2nd	44	Gary Southgate/Katrin Schmid
3rd	11	Wayne Read/Craig Mathison

=== 1000cc Sidecars ===
Pos	Number	Team
1st	24	Rob Wilson/Terry Saunters
2nd	9	Myles Simmons/Kevin Woodley
3rd	2	Steve Smith/Matt Vickery
