= 1992 Speedway Champions Cup =

Motorcycle speedway competition

The Speedway Champions Cup was an annual motorcycle speedway competition that took place between 1986 and 1993, featuring the national champions of the sixteen participating nations. It was discontinued with the introduction of the Speedway Grand Prix in 1995.

The 1992 championship was held at Rovno and the winner was Gert Handberg from Denmark.

== Results ==
- August 2, 1992
- (Commonwealth of Independent States) Rovno

Placing	Rider	Total	1	2	3	4	5	6	7	8	9	10	11	12	13	14	15	16	17	18	19	20	Pts	Pos
1	(Denmark) (3) Gert Handberg	13	3						1				3				3				3		13	1
2	(Hungary) (16) Zoltan Adorjan	12				3				2	3						2			2			12	2
3	(Sweden) (7) Peter Karlsson	11		3					2					3	3					E			11	3
4	(Czechoslovakia) (11) Václav Milík, Sr.	10			3				0		2					2						3	10	4
5	(Italy) (15) Armando Castagna	10				2			3			2						E	3				10	5
6	(Austria) (9) Andreas Bossner	10			2		1						2					2		3			10	6
7	(United States) (12) Mike Faria	9			0					3		3			2						1		9	7
8	(United Kingdom) (6) Gary Havelock	8		E				3			X							3			2		8	8
9	(Latvia) (1) Andrejs Koroļevs	5	2				2				F				0				1				5	9
10	(Germany) (10) Roland Kolros	5			1			2						1			1		F				5	10
11	(Commonwealth of Independent States) (4) Sergey Kuzin	4	0							1				2				1				F	4	11
12	(Finland) (8) Mikka Pelinen	4		1						0			1			0			2				4	12
13	(Norway) (2) Einar Kylingstaad	4	1					E				1				1				1			4	13
14	(Socialist Federal Republic of Yugoslavia) (5) Gregor Pintar	2		2			0					0					0					F	2	14
15	(Poland) (14) Slawomir Drabik	2				1		1					0		-							-	2	15
16	(Netherlands) (13) Robert Staecman	0				0	T							E		-					-		0	16
R1	(Commonwealth of Independent States) (R1) Vladimir Trofimov	6					3								1							2	6	R1
R2	(Commonwealth of Independent States) (R2) Viktor Gaydym	4									1					3					0		4	R2
Placing	Rider	Total	1	2	3	4	5	6	7	8	9	10	11	12	13	14	15	16	17	18	19	20	Pts	Pos

m - exclusion for exceeding two minute time allowance • t - exclusion for touching the tapes • x - other exclusion • e - retired or mechanical failure • f - fell • ns - non-starter • nc - non-classify

gate A - inside	gate B	gate C	gate D - outside
