= 1990 Speedway Champions Cup =

Annual Motorcycle Competition

The Speedway Champions Cup was an annual motorcycle speedway competition that took place between 1986 and 1993, featuring the national champions of the sixteen participating nations. It was discontinued with the introduction of the Speedway Grand Prix in 1995.

The 1990 championship was held at Lonigo and the winner was Hans Nielsen from Denmark.

== Results ==
- April 29, 1990
- (Italy) Lonigo

Placing	Rider	Total	1	2	3	4	5	6	7	8	9	10	11	12	13	14	15	16	17	18	19	20	Pts	Pos	21
1	(Denmark) (6) Hans Nielsen	14		3				3			3							2			3		14	1	3
2	(Hungary) (4) Zoltan Adorjan	14	3							2				3				3				3	14	2	2
3	(England) (9) Simon Wigg	12			2		3						3					1		3			12	3	
4	(West Germany) (12) Klaus Lausch	11			3					3		E			3						2		11	4	
5	(Norway) (16) Arnt Forland	11				3				1	2						3			2			11	5	
6	(Sweden) (8) Peter Karlsson	10		2						0			2			3			3				10	6	
7	(Soviet Union) (2) Rif Saitgareev	10	2					2				3				2				1			10	7	
8	(Finland) (11) Juha Moksunen	8			1				3		1					1						2	8	8	
9	(Czech Republic) (14) Petr Vandirek	7				2		1					1		2							1	7	9	
10	(Poland) (5) Wojciech Zaluski	6		1			2					2					1					0	6	10	
11	(Italy) (7) Valentino Furlanetto	5		0					2					2	1					0			5	11	
12	(Austria) (15) Toni Pilotto	5				1			1			1						0	2				5	12	
13	(Socialist Federal Republic of Yugoslavia) (3) Gregor Pintar	3	0						0				0				2				1		3	13	
14	(Bulgaria) (1) Nikolai Manev	2	1				1				E				E				X				2	14	
15	(Italy) (13) Gianni Famari	1				0	E							1		0					0		1	15	
16	(Netherlands) (10) Rene Elzinga	1			E			0						0			0		1				1	16	
Placing	Rider	Total	1	2	3	4	5	6	7	8	9	10	11	12	13	14	15	16	17	18	19	20	Pts	Pos	21

m - exclusion for exceeding two minute time allowance • t - exclusion for touching the tapes • x - other exclusion • e - retired or mechanical failure • f - fell • ns - non-starter • nc - non-classify

gate A - inside	gate B	gate C	gate D - outside
