= 2002 Individual Speedway Junior European Championship =

Motorcycle racing competition

Seasons
- ← 2001 2003 →

The 2002 European Individual Speedway Junior Championship was the fifth edition of the Championship.

== Qualification ==
- Scandinavian Final (Semi-Final A):
  - May 25, 2002
  - (Norway) Elgane
- Semi-Final B:
  - May 30, 2002
  - (Germany) Olching
- Semi-Final C:
  - June 2, 2002
  - (Latvia) Daugavpils

== Final ==
- August 25, 2002
- (Latvia) Daugavpils, Spidveja Centrs

Placing	Rider	Total	1	2	3	4	5	6	7	8	9	10	11	12	13	14	15	16	17	18	19	20	Pts	Pos
1	(Slovenia) (3) Matej Žagar	15	3						3				3				3				3		15	1
2	(Denmark) (14) Kenneth Bjerre	14				3		3					2		3							3	14	2
3	(Sweden) (13) Fredrik Lindgren	12				2	3							3		3					1		12	3
4	(Poland) (15) Marek Cieślewicz	11				1			2			3						2	3				11	4
5	(Poland) (16) Krzysztof Kasprzak	9				0				2	3						2			2			9	5
6	(Sweden) (5) Jonas Davidsson	9		3			2					1					1					2	9	6
7	(Russia) (10) Denis Gizatullin	8			3			2						1			F		2				8	7
8	(Poland) (9) Robert Miśkowiak	7			0		1						0					3		3			7	8
9	(Czech Republic) (12) Tomáš Suchánek	7			1					1		2			1						2		7	9
10	(Sweden) (4) Daniel Davidsson	6	2							F				2				1				1	6	10
11	(Sweden) (8) Antonio Lindbäck	5		1						3			1			X			-				5	11
12	(Poland) (7) Piotr Świderski	5		2					1					F	2					0			5	12
13	(Germany) (2) Martin Smolinski	4	E					1				0				2				1			4	13
14	(Latvia) (11) Leonid Paura	3			2				0		1					T						E	3	14
15	(Czech Republic) (6) Miroslav Fencl	2		0				0			2							0			0		2	15
16	(Poland) (1) Łukasz Romanek	1	1				E				0				0				0				1	16
R1	(Latvia) (R1) Kasts Poudzuks	2														1			1				2	R1
Placing	Rider	Total	1	2	3	4	5	6	7	8	9	10	11	12	13	14	15	16	17	18	19	20	Pts	Pos

m - exclusion for exceeding two minute time allowance • t - exclusion for touching the tapes • x - other exclusion • e - retired or mechanical failure • f - fell • ns - non-starter • nc - non-classify

gate A - inside	gate B	gate C	gate D - outside
