= Artem Vodyakov =

Russian speedway rider

- Born: 23 July 1991 (age 35); Russia
- Nationality: Russia

Current club information
- Polish league: ZKŻ Zielona Góra
- Russian league: SK Turbina Balakovo

Career history
- ?: Balakovo (RUS)
- 2008-: Zielona Góra (POL)

Artem Vodyakov (Russian: Артём Павлович Водяков; born 23 July 1991) is a Russian speedway rider who is a member of Russia national U-21 and U-19 teams. Vodyakov was third in 2008 Individual U-19 European Championship.

== Career details ==
=== World Championships ===
- Individual U-21 World Championship
  - 2008 - injury in Semi-Final 2
  - 2009 - resigned in Qualifying Round 1
- Team U-21 World Championship (Under-21 Speedway World Cup)
  - 2008 - 4th place in Qualifying Round 1 (6 points)

=== European Championships ===
- Individual U-19 European Championship
  - 2008 - (Germany) Stralsund - Bronze medal (13+2 points)
- Team U-19 European Championship
  - 2008 - 2nd place in Semi-Final 2 (8 points)

== See also ==
- Russia national speedway team
