= Łukasz Jankowski =

Polish motorcycle speedway rider (born 1982)

- Born: 7 December 1982 (age 43); Leszno, Poland
- Nationality: Polish

Career history

Poland
- 1999-2005: Leszno
- 2006: Gniezno
- 2007: Ostrów
- 2008-2009: Poznań
- 2010-2011: Łódź
- 2012: Zielona Góra
- 2013: Gorzów
- 2013: Kraków

Great Britain
- 2002: King's Lynn Stars
- 2007-2008, 2011: Belle Vue Aces
- 2009: Poole Pirates

Łukasz Jankowski (born 7 December 1982, in Leszno, Poland) is a former motorcycle speedway rider from Poland.

== Career ==
In 2002, Jankowski reached the final of the 2002 Speedway Under-21 World Championship.

Jankowski rode for the Poole Pirates in the 2009 British Elite League. In 2011 he joined Belle Vue for a second stint at the club but was replaced in 2012 by Linus Eklöf.

== Family ==
Jankowski is the son of Roman Jankowski, a champion Polish speedway rider. His brothers Marcin and Norbert were also speedway riders.

== Results ==
=== World Championships ===
- Individual U-21 World Championship
  - 2002 - (Czech Republic) Slaný - 7th place (9 pts)

=== Polish Championships ===
- Individual Polish Championship
  - 2008 - 11th place in Quarter-Final D
- Individual U-21 Polish Championship
  - 2001 - Częstochowa - Bronze medal
- Team Polish Championship (Speedway Ekstraliga)
  - 2002 - Silver medal
