= 2025 European Pairs Speedway Championship =

Motorcycle speedway event

The 2025 European Pairs Speedway Championship was the 22nd edition of the European Pairs Speedway Championship. The final was held at the Stadium Lokomotīve in Daugavpils, Latvia, on 19 July.

The qualifier was held at the Matija Gubec Stadium in Krško, Slovenia, on 26 April, which resulted in a win for Czech Republic on 32 points followed by Slovenia (29), France (26), Sweden (23), Ukraine (19), Italy (17), Norway (11) and Germany (10).

In the final, Denmark won the event for the third time.

== Final ==
- Stadium Lokomotīve in Daugavpils, Latvia, on 19 July 2025

Position	team	Points	Riders
1	Denmark	31	Leon Madsen 18, Andreas Lyager 13
2	Latvia	30	Andžejs Ļebedevs 18, Daniils Kolodinskis 7, Jevgeņijs Kostigovs 5
3	Czech Republic	26	Adam Bednar 15, Jan Kvěch 11, Václav Milík Jr. 0
4	(United Kingdom) Great Britain	21	Tom Brennan 12, Adam Ellis 9
4	Poland	21	Grzegorz Zengota 14, Tobiasz Musielak 7
6	Slovenia	14	Matic Ivačič 7, Anže Grmek 7
7	France	12	David Bellego 12, Mathias Trésarrieu 0, Tino Bouin 0
8	Finland	12	Jesse Mustonen 9, Antti Vuolas 3

== See also ==
- 2025 Speedway European Championship
- 2025 European Team Speedway Championship
