= 2000 Individual Speedway Junior European Championship =

Motorcycle racing competition

Seasons
- ← 1999 2001 →

The 2000 European Individual Speedway Junior Championship was the third edition of the Championship.

== Qualification ==
- Qualifying round:
  - May 6, 2000
  - (Hungary) Debrecen
- Semi-Final A:
  - May 21, 2000
  - (Denmark) Glumso
- Semi-Final B:
  - August 20, 2000
  - (Belgium) Heusden-Zolder

== Final ==
- August 27, 2000
- (Slovenia) Ljubljana

Placing	Rider	Total	1	2	3	4	5	6	7	8	9	10	11	12	13	14	15	16	17	18	19	20	Pts	Pos	21
1	(Czech Republic) (1) Lukáš Dryml	13	3				3				3				1				3				13	1	
2	(Denmark) (8) Niels Kristian Iversen	12		3						2			3			3			1				12	2	
3	(Poland) (15) Zbigniew Czerwiński	11				0			3			3						3	2				11	3	3
4	(Germany) (2) Martin Smolinski	11	2					2				2				2				3			11	5	2
5	(Czech Republic) (13) Miroslav Fencl	11				3	2							3		1					2		11	4	E
6	(Sweden) (14) Jonas Davidsson	8				2		0					0		3							3	8	6	
7	(Slovenia) (10) Jernej Kolenko	8			3			3						2			E		X				8	7	
8	(Russia) (7) Renat Gafurov	8		2					2					1	2					1			8	8	
9	(Poland) (6) Łukasz Pawlikowski	7		1				1			2							0			3		7	9	
10	(Poland) (12) Sebastian Smoter	7			2					3		1			0						1		7	10	
11	(Slovenia) (17) Matej Žagar	7			1		E						2					2		2			7	11	
12	(Poland) (3) Tomasz Kwiatkowski	5	1						0				1				3				0		5	12	
13	(Sweden) (16) Eric Andersson	5				1				1	1						2			0			5	13	
14	(Slovenia) (18) Primoz Klimkovsky	3																					3	14	
15	(United Kingdom) (4) Adam Allott	2	0							0				0				1				1	2	15	
16	(Denmark) (5) Ulrich Ostergaard	2		0			1					0					1					0	2	16	
17	(Poland) (9) Łukasz Stanisławski	0			F/-		-						-					-		-			0	17	
18	(Poland) (11) Michał Aszenberg	0			F/-				-		-					-						-	0	18	
Placing	Rider	Total	1	2	3	4	5	6	7	8	9	10	11	12	13	14	15	16	17	18	19	20	Pts	Pos	21

m - exclusion for exceeding two minute time allowance • t - exclusion for touching the tapes • x - other exclusion • e - retired or mechanical failure • f - fell • ns - non-starter • nc - non-classify

gate A - inside	gate B	gate C	gate D - outside
