= 1993 Speedway Champions Cup =

The Speedway Champions Cup was an annual motorcycle speedway competition that took place between 1986 and 1993, featuring the national champions of the sixteen participating nations. It was discontinued with the introduction of the Speedway Grand Prix in 1995.

The 1993 championship was held at Tampere and the winner was Tomasz Gollob from Poland.

== Results ==
- May 19, 1993
- (Finland) Tampere

Placing	Rider	Total	1	2	3	4	5	6	7	8	9	10	11	12	13	14	15	16	17	18	19	20	Pts	Pos	21	22
1	(Poland) (14) Tomasz Gollob	13				2		2					3		3							3	13	1		3
2	(Australia) (16) Leigh Adams	13				3				3	3						3			1			13	2		2
3	(Italy) (2) Armando Castagna	11	3					3				2				E				3			11	3	3	
4	(United States) (3) John Cook	11	1						3				2				2				3		11	4	2	
5	(Norway) (12) Lars Gunnestad	10			3					2		3			2						X		10	5		
6	(Denmark) (10) Gert Handberg	10			2			1						3			1		3				10	6		
7	(United Kingdom) (1) Gary Havelock	8	2				3				1				0				2				8	7		
8	(Finland) (11) Vesa Yulinen	8			1				1		2					2						2	8	8		
9	(Russia) (9) Sergey Kuzin	7			0		1						1					3		2			7	9		
10	(Latvia) (13) Nikolay Kokin	7				1	0							1		3					2		7	10		
11	(Hungary) (7) Joszef Petrikovicz	7		2					2					2	1					0			7	11		
12	(Czech Republic) (5) Bohumil Brhel	6		3			2					E					0					1	6	12		
13	(Finland) (6) Roy Malminhelmo	4		1				0			E							2			1		4	13		
14	(Finland) (15) Arto Orio	3				0			0			1						1	1				3	14		
15	(Austria) (4) Andreas Bossner	1	0							1				E				0				0	1	15		
16	(Netherlands) (8) Robert Stecman	1		0						0			0			1			0				1	16		
Placing	Rider	Total	1	2	3	4	5	6	7	8	9	10	11	12	13	14	15	16	17	18	19	20	Pts	Pos	21	22

m - exclusion for exceeding two minute time allowance • t - exclusion for touching the tapes • x - other exclusion • e - retired or mechanical failure • f - fell • ns - non-starter • nc - non-classify

gate A - inside	gate B	gate C	gate D - outside
