= 2026 European Under-24 Individual Speedway Cup =

European motorcycle speedway event

- Venue: Perényi Pál Salakmotor Stadion
- Location: Debrecen, Hungary
- Start date: 1 May 2026
- Competitors: 16 (1 reserve) from 13 nations

The 2026 European Under-24 Individual Speedway Cup was the inaugural edition of the European Under-24 Individual Speedway Cup, organised by FIM Europe.

It was held on 1 May 2026 at the Perényi Pál Salakmotor Stadion in Debrecen, Hungary. Mathias Pollestad won the event ahead of Villads Nagel and Janek Konzack.

== Final ==
- 1 May 2026
- (Hungary) Perényi Pál Salakmotor Stadion, Debrecen

Placing	Rider	1	2	3	4	5	6	7	8	9	10	11	12	13	14	15	16	17	18	19	20	Pts	SF1	Final
1	(Norway) (15) Mathias Pollestad				3			3			3						3	1				13		3
2	(Denmark) (5) Villads Nagel		3			3					2					3					2	13		2
3	(Germany) (4) Janek Konzack	2							3				3				1				3	12	3	1
4	(Slovenia) (1) Anže Grmek	3				1				2				2				3				11	2	0
5	(Poland) (6) Jakub Krawczyk		1				2			3							2			3		11	0	
6	(Latvia) (11) Francis Gusts			3				2		1					3						1	10	1	
7	(Austria) (7) Sebastian Kössler		2					1					0	3					3			9		
8	(Sweden) (14) Casper Henriksson				2		3					3		0							0	8		
9	(Germany) (10) Patrick Hyjek			2			1						1			2		2				8		
10	(Slovenia) (13) Sven Cerjak				1	2							2		1					1		7		
11	(Hungary) (8) Zoltán Lovas		0x						2			2			2			0				6		
12	(Czech Republic) (12) Bruno Belan			1					1		1			1						2		6		
13	(Finland) (16) Otto Raak				0				0	0						1			2			3		
14	(Czech Republic) (9) Jan Jeníček			0		0						1					0		1			2		
15	(Ukraine) (3) Danko Hladkovskyi	1						0				0x				0e				0x		1		
16	(France) (2) Terence Paget	0					0				0				0				0			0		
R1	(Hungary) (R1) Richárd Füzesi																					0	R1	

m - exclusion for exceeding two minute time allowance • t - exclusion for touching the tapes • x - other exclusion • e - retired or mechanical failure • f - fell • ns - non-starter • nc - non-classify

gate A - inside	gate B	gate C	gate D - outside
