= 1986 Speedway Champions Cup =

The Speedway Champions Cup was an annual motorcycle speedway competition that took place between 1986 and 1993, featuring the national champions of the sixteen participating nations. It was discontinued with the introduction of the Speedway Grand Prix in 1995.

The 1986 championship was held at Pardubice and the winner was Erik Stenlund from Sweden.

== Results ==
- August 3, 1986
- (Czechoslovakia) Pardubice

Placing	Rider	Total	1	2	3	4	5	6	7	8	9	10	11	12	13	14	15	16	17	18	19	20	Pts	Pos	21
1	(Sweden) (7) Erik Stenlund	14		3					3					3	2					3			14	1	
2	(Soviet Union) (12) Viktor Kuznetsov	13			2					3		3			3						2		13	2	3
3	(Czech Republic) (5) Antonín Kasper, Jr.	13		2			3					2					3					3	13	3	2
4	(Italy) (3) Armando Castagna	12	3						1				3				2				3		12	4	
5	(Czech Republic) (15) Roman Matoušek	10				3			X			1						3	3				10	5	
6	(Hungary) (4) Zoltan Adorjan	8	2							1				1				2				2	8	6	
7	(Czech Republic) (8) Petr Vandirek	7		1						0			1			3			2				7	7	
8	(Czech Republic) (1) Pavel Karnas	7	1				1				3				1				1				7	8	
9	(Bulgaria) (13) Nikolaj Manev	7				2	2							2		1					0		7	9	
10	(Poland) (6) Zenon Plech	6		0				3			2							0			1		6	10	
11	(England) (11) John Davis	6			3				2		1					F						-	6	11	
12	(Austria) (9) Siegfried Eder	6			1		E						2					1		2			6	12	
13	(Socialist Federal Republic of Yugoslavia) (2) Krešo Omerzel	4	0					1				0				2				1			4	13	
14	(Finland) (16) Juha Moksunen	4				1				2	0						1			E			4	14	
15	(Netherlands) (14) Henny Kroeze	2				0		2					0		0							0	2	15	
16	(East Germany) (10) Diethelm Trimer	0			0			0						0			0		0				0	16	
R1	(Czech Republic) (R1) Petr Kučera	1																				1	1	R1	
Placing	Rider	Total	1	2	3	4	5	6	7	8	9	10	11	12	13	14	15	16	17	18	19	20	Pts	Pos	21

m - exclusion for exceeding two minute time allowance • t - exclusion for touching the tapes • x - other exclusion • e - retired or mechanical failure • f - fell • ns - non-starter • nc - non-classify

gate A - inside	gate B	gate C	gate D - outside
