= 2004 Individual Speedway Junior European Championship =

Motorcycle racing competition

Seasons
- ← 2003 2005 →

The 2004 European Individual Speedway Junior Championship was the seventh edition of the Championship.

== Qualification ==
- Scandinavian Final (Semi-Final A):
  - August 30, 2004
  - (Denmark) Outrup
- Semi-Final B:
  - July 17, 2004
  - (Ukraine) Rivne
- Semi-Final C:
  - July 17, 2004
  - (Germany) Teterow

== Final ==
- August 28, 2004
- (Poland) Rybnik

| Placing | Rider | Total | 1 | 2 | 3 | 4 | 5 | 6 | 7 | 8 | 9 | 10 | 11 | 12 | 13 | 14 | 15 | 16 | 17 | 18 | 19 | 20 | Pts | Pos | 21 |
|---|---|---|---|---|---|---|---|---|---|---|---|---|---|---|---|---|---|---|---|---|---|---|---|---|---|
| 1 | (Sweden) (2) Antonio Lindbäck | 15 | 3 | | | | | 3 | | | | 3 | | | | 3 | | | | 3 | | | 15 | 1 | |
| 2 | (Poland) (10) Karol Ząbik | 12 | | | 3 | | | 1 | | | | | | 3 | | | 3 | | 2 | | | | 12 | 2 | 3 |
| 3 | (Denmark) (7) Morten Risager | 12 | | 3 | | | | | 3 | | | | | 2 | 3 | | | | | 1 | | | 12 | 3 | 2 |
| 4 | (Sweden) (1) Fredrik Lindgren | 11 | 2 | | | | 3 | | | | 3 | | | | E | | | | 3 | | | | 11 | 4 | |
| 5 | (Latvia) (9) Kasts Poudzuks | 10 | | | 2 | | 1 | | | | | | 2 | | | | | 3 | | 2 | | | 10 | 5 | |
| 6 | (Denmark) (5) Henrik Møller | 8 | | 2 | | | 0 | | | | | 2 | | | | | 1 | | | | | 3 | 8 | 6 | |
| 7 | (Poland) (14) Paweł Hlib | 8 | | | | 1 | | 2 | | | | | 3 | | 2 | | | | | | | E | 8 | 7 | |
| 8 | (Germany) (8) Christian Hefenbrock | 6 | | 1 | | | | | | 3 | | | 1 | | | 1 | | | 0 | | | | 6 | 8 | |
| 9 | (Poland) (16) Krzysztof Buczkowski | 6 | | | | 0 | | | | 2 | 2 | | | | | | 2 | | | 0 | | | 6 | 9 | |
| 10 | (Czech Republic) (11) Zdeněk Simota | 6 | | | 0 | | | | 1 | | 1 | | | | | 2 | | | | | | 2 | 6 | 10 | |
| 11 | (Czech Republic) (4) Luboš Tomíček, Jr. | 6 | 1 | | | | | | | 1 | | | | 1 | | | | 2 | | | | 1 | 6 | 11 | |
| 12 | (Czech Republic) (3) Filip Šitera | 5 | 0 | | | | | | 2 | | | | 0 | | | | 0 | | | | 3 | | 5 | 12 | |
| 13 | (Poland) (13) Adrian Miedziński | 5 | | | | 3 | 2 | | | | | | | E | | F | | | | | - | | 5 | 13 | |
| 14 | (Poland) (15) Mirosław Jabłoński | 4 | | | | 2 | | | 0 | | | 1 | | | | | | E | 1 | | | | 4 | 14 | |
| 15 | (Sweden) (12) Tomas Messing | 4 | | | 1 | | | | | 0 | | 0 | | | 1 | | | | | | 2 | | 4 | 15 | |
| 16 | (France) (6) Mathieu Tresarrieu | 1 | | 0 | | | | 0 | | | 0 | | | | | | | 1 | | | E | | 1 | 16 | |
| R1 | (Germany) (R1) Alexander Lischke | 1 | | | | | | | | | | | | | | | | | | | 1 | | 1 | R1 | |
| | (R2) None | 0 | | | | | | | | | | | | | | | | | | | | | 0 | | |
| Placing | Rider | Total | 1 | 2 | 3 | 4 | 5 | 6 | 7 | 8 | 9 | 10 | 11 | 12 | 13 | 14 | 15 | 16 | 17 | 18 | 19 | 20 | Pts | Pos | 21 |

m - exclusion for exceeding two minute time allowance • t - exclusion for touching the tapes • x - other exclusion • e - retired or mechanical failure • f - fell • ns - non-starter • nc - non-classify

| gate A - inside | gate B | gate C | gate D - outside |
