= 2003 Individual Speedway Junior European Championship =

Motorcycle racing competition

Seasons
- ← 2002 2004 →

The 2003 European Individual Speedway Junior Championship was the sixth edition of the Championship.

== Qualification ==
- Scandinavian Final (Semi-Final A):
  - August 23, 2003
  - (Denmark) Herning
- Semi-Final B:
  - August 24, 2003
  - (Slovenia) Lendawa
- Semi-Final C:
  - August 31, 2003
  - (Slovakia) Zarnovice

== Final ==
- September 20, 2003
- (Germany) Pocking

Placing	Rider	Total	1	2	3	4	5	6	7	8	9	10	11	12	13	14	15	16	17	18	19	20	Pts	Pos	21
1	(Denmark) (15) Kenneth Bjerre	15				3			3			3						3	3				15	1	
2	(Poland) (1) Janusz Kołodziej	13	2				3				3				3				2				13	2	3
3	(Sweden) (14) Antonio Lindbäck	13				2		3					3		2							3	13	3	2
4	(Sweden) (3) Fredrik Lindgren	11	3						E				2				3				3		11	4	
5	(Poland) (12) Marcin Rempała	9			3					3		2			1						0		9	5	
6	(Poland) (6) Mirosław Jabłoński	8		2				2			2							0			2		8	6	
7	(Sweden) (8) Sebastian Aldén	7		3						0			1			3			0				7	7	
8	(Austria) (13) Friedrich Wallner	7				F	1							3		2					1		7	8	
9	(Germany) (9) Matthias Schultz	7			1		2						X					2		2			7	9	
10	(Sweden) (11) Eric Andersson	6			2				2		0					0						2	6	10	
11	(Poland) (2) Paweł Hlib	5	0					E				1				1				3			5	11	
12	(Poland) (4) Krzysztof Buczkowski	5	1							2				1				1				F	5	12	
13	(Czech Republic) (16) Luboš Tomíček, Jr.	5				1				1	1						1			1			5	13	
14	(Russia) (7) Maxim Kalimullin	3		0					1					2	0					0			3	14	
15	(Poland) (5) Adrian Miedziński	3		1			0					0					2					F	3	15	
16	(Germany) (10) Martin Smolinski	2			E			1						0			0		1				2	16	
	(R1) None	0																					0		
	(R2) None	0																					0		
Placing	Rider	Total	1	2	3	4	5	6	7	8	9	10	11	12	13	14	15	16	17	18	19	20	Pts	Pos	21

m - exclusion for exceeding two minute time allowance • t - exclusion for touching the tapes • x - other exclusion • e - retired or mechanical failure • f - fell • ns - non-starter • nc - non-classify

gate A - inside	gate B	gate C	gate D - outside
