= 2002 Speedway Under-21 World Championship =

European motorcycle speedway event

World Under-21 Championship
- Venue: Slaný Speedway
- Location: Slaný, Czech Republic
- Start date: 7 September 2002

The 2002 Individual Speedway Junior World Championship was the 26th edition of the World motorcycle speedway Under-21 Championships.

The final was won by Lukáš Dryml of the Czech Republic.

== World final ==
- 7 September 2002
- (Czech Republic) Slaný Speedway, Slaný

Placing	Rider	Total	1	2	3	4	5	6	7	8	9	10	11	12	13	14	15	16	17	18	19	20	Pts	Pos	21
1	(Czech Republic) (12) Lukáš Dryml	14			3					3		3			3						2		14	2	3
2	(Poland) (13) Krzysztof Kasprzak	14				3	3							2		3					3		14	1	2
3	(England) (7) David Howe	12		2					3					3	2					2			12	3	
4	(Sweden) (16) Freddie Eriksson	11				2				2	1						3			3			11	4	
5	(England) (11) Chris Harris	11			2				2		3					2						2	11	5	
6	(Poland) (4) Rafał Kurmański	10	2							1				1				3				3	10	6	
7	(Poland) (3) Łukasz Jankowski	9	3						1				3				2				E		9	7	
8	(Denmark) (10) Henning Bager	8			1			3						0			1		3				8	8	
9	(Denmark) (6) Kenneth Bjerre	6		3				E			2							X			1		6	9	
10	(Canada) (15) Krzysztof Słaboń	5				1			0			2						2	E				5	10	
11	(England) (1) Oliver Allen	5	1				1				0				1				2				5	11	
12	(Czech Republic) (9) Tomáš Suchánek	4			0		2						0					1		1			4	12	
13	(Slovenia) (14) Jernej Kolenko	4				0		2					1		E							1	4	13	
14	(Sweden) (8) Antonio Lindbäck	3		0						E			2			0			1				3	14	
15	(Russia) (5) Denis Saifutdinov	2		1			0					1					0					0	2	15	
16	(Sweden) (2) Daniel Davidsson	1	0					1				0				T				0			1	16	
R1	(Slovenia) (R1) Matej Žagar	1														1							1	R1	
R2	(Sweden) (R2) Fredrik Lindgren	0																					0	R2	
Placing	Rider	Total	1	2	3	4	5	6	7	8	9	10	11	12	13	14	15	16	17	18	19	20	Pts	Pos	21

m - exclusion for exceeding two minute time allowance • t - exclusion for touching the tapes • x - other exclusion • e - retired or mechanical failure • f - fell • ns - non-starter • nc - non-classify

gate A - inside	gate B	gate C	gate D - outside
