= 1999 Individual Speedway Junior European Championship =

Motorcycle racing competition

Seasons
- ← 1998 2000 →

The 1999 European Individual Speedway Junior Championship was the second edition of the Championship.

== Qualification ==
- Qualifying round:
  - June 6, 1999
  - (Finland) Pori
- Semi-Final A:
  - June 20, 1999
  - (Ukraine) Rivne
- Semi-Final B:
  - July 25, 1999
  - (Slovenia) Ljubljana

== Final ==
- August 1, 1999
- (Poland) Gniezno

Placing	Rider	Total	1	2	3	4	5	6	7	8	9	10	11	12	13	14	15	16	17	18	19	20	Pts	Pos	21	22
1	(Poland) (16) Rafał Okoniewski	13				3				3	2						3			2			13	1		3
2	(Poland) (3) Karol Malecha	13	3						2				3				2				3		13	2		2
3	(Poland) (14) Jarosław Hampel	12				2		2					2		3							3	12	4	3	
4	(Poland) (2) Tomasz Chrzanowski	12	1					3				3				2				3			12	3	2	
5	(Denmark) (11) Hans N. Andersen	11			X				3		3					3						2	11	5		
6	(Czech Republic) (10) Lukáš Dryml	11			3			1						3			1		3				11	6		
7	(Norway) (1) Bjoern G. Hansen	9	2				3				0				2				2				9	7		
8	(Poland) (15) Krzysztof Mikuta	7				1			1			2						2	1				7	8		
9	(Poland) (9) Andrzej Zieja	7			2		2						1					1		1			7	9		
10	(Denmark) (6) Henning Bager	6		2				0			1							3			X		6	10		
11	(Hungary) (5) Sandor Fekete	6		3			1					1					0					1	6	11		
12	(Hungary) (7) Janosh Golenja	4		1					0					2	1					0			4	12		
13	(Norway) (8) Keneth Borgenhaug	3		0						2			0			1			0				3	13		
14	(Slovenia) (12) Jernej Kolenko	2			1					1		0			0						X		2	14		
15	(Czech Republic) (4) Miroslav Fencl	1	0							0				1				0				E	1	15		
16	(Czech Republic) (13) Ondrej Sebela	0				0	0							E		-					-		0	16		
R1	(Norway) (R1) Patrick Haraldsen	2														0					2		2	R1		
R2	(Finland) (R2) Juha Makkela	0																					0	R2		
Placing	Rider	Total	1	2	3	4	5	6	7	8	9	10	11	12	13	14	15	16	17	18	19	20	Pts	Pos	21	22

m - exclusion for exceeding two minute time allowance • t - exclusion for touching the tapes • x - other exclusion • e - retired or mechanical failure • f - fell • ns - non-starter • nc - non-classify

gate A - inside	gate B	gate C	gate D - outside
