= 2025 Speedway European Championship =

Speedway competition

Season details
- Dates: 1 May – 19 September 2025
- Events: 4
- Cities: 4
- Countries: 3
- Riders: 15 permanents 1 wild card(s); 2 track reserves
- Heats: (in 4 events)

Winners
- Champion: POL Patryk Dudek
- Runner-up: LVA Andžejs Ļebedevs
- 3rd place: DEN Leon Madsen

The 2025 Speedway European Championship season was the 13th season of the Speedway European Championship (SEC) era, and the 25th Individual Speedway European Championship.

The winner of the title ensured qualification for the 2026 Speedway Grand Prix series.

== Qualification ==
=== Qualifiers ===
The top four riders from each heat qualified for the SEC Challenge.

Round	Date	Venue	Winner
QR1	1 May	(Austria) Speedway Center Mureck, Mureck	(Denmark) Frederik Jakobsen
QR2	1 May	(Germany) Holsteinring, Brokstedt	(Poland) Patryk Dudek
QR3	1 May	(Hungary) Perényi Pál Salakmotor Stadion, Debrecen	(Poland) Bartłomiej Kowalski
QR4	17 May	(France) Piste de Speedway de Lamothe Landerron, Lamothe-Landerron	(Poland) Szymon Woźniak

=== Q1 ===
- 1 May 2025
- (Austria) Speedway Center Mureck, Mureck

Pos.	Rider	Details	Points
1	(Denmark) Frederik Jakobsen	3, 3, 3, 3, 3	15
2	(Finland) / (Sweden) Timo Lahti	3, 3, 3, 2, 2	13
3	(Poland) Krzysztof Buczkowski	3, 2, 1, 3, 3	12
4	(Ukraine) Marko Levishyn	2, 2, 2, 3, 3	12
5	(Poland) Robert Chmiel	2, 3, 3, 1, 2	11
6	(United Kingdom) Tom Brennan	2, 2, 0, 3, 3	10
7	(Latvia) Francis Gusts	1, 3, 1, 2, 1	8
8	(Italy) Nico Covatti	3, 1, 1, 2, R	7
9	(Austria) Daniel Gappmaier (res)	2, 1, 1, 2, 1	7
10	(Latvia) Oļegs Mihailovs	1, 1, 2, 2, R	6
11	(Slovenia) Matic Ivačič	2, 2, 0, R, 2	6
12	(Czech Republic) Jan Macek	1, 1, 2, X, 1	5
13	(Germany) Erik Riss	R, 1, 3, -, -	4
14	(Norway) Truls Kamhaug	0, 0, 1, 1, 0	2
15	(Austria) Sebastian Koessler	1, R, 0, R, -	1
16	(Slovenia) Denis Štojs	0, 0, -, -, -	0
17	(Czech Republic) Eduard Krčmář	0, R, -, -, -	0

=== Q2 ===
- 1 May 2025
- (Germany) Holsteinring, Brokstedt

Pos.	Rider	Details	Points
1	(Poland) Patryk Dudek	3, 3, 3, 2, 3	14+3
2	(Czech Republic) Václav Milík Jr.	3, 2, 3, 3, 3	14+2
3	(Ukraine) Nazar Parnitskyi	3, 2, 3, 3, 2	13
4	(Denmark) Rasmus Jensen	3, 2, 1, 1, 3	10
5	(France) Dimitri Bergé	1, 3, 1, 2, 2	9
6	(Sweden) Kim Nilsson	2, 1, 2, 3, 1	9
7	(Germany) Norick Blödorn	2, 3, 0, X, 3	8
8	(Italy) Paco Castagna	1, 0, 2, 3, 1	7
9	(Latvia) Jevgeņijs Kostigovs	2, 0, 3, R, 2	7
10	(United Kingdom) Adam Ellis	2, 0, 2, 2, R	6
11	(Poland) Grzegorz Zengota	1, 1, 2, 2, R	6
12	(Sweden) Philip Hellström Bängs	0, 2, 1, 1, 1	5
13	(Germany) Kevin Wölbert	1, 1, 0, 1, 2	5
14	(Finland) Antti Vuolas	0, 3, 1, 0, 1	5
15	(Norway) Magnus Klipper	0, 0, 0, 1, 0	1
16	(Netherlands) Mika Meijer	0, 1, 0, F, 0	1

=== Q3 ===
- 1 May 2025
- (Hungary) Perényi Pál Salakmotor Stadion, Debrecen

Pos.	Rider	Details	Points
1	(Poland) Bartłomiej Kowalski	3, 3, 3, 3, 3	15
2	(Denmark) Michael Jepsen Jensen	3, 2, 3, 3, 3	14
3	(Poland) Mateusz Cierniak	3, 3, 3, 2, 2	13
4	(Czech Republic) Daniel Klíma	1, 2, 2, 3, 3	11
5	(Slovenia) Anže Grmek	2, 3, 3, 1, 1	10
6	(Sweden) Jacob Thorssell	2, 1, 2, 2, 3	10
7	(Ukraine) Roman Kapustin	2, 3, 2, 1, 1	10
8	(Latvia) Daniils Kolodinskis	2, 2, 1, 2, 2	9
9	(Slovakia) Jakub Valković	1, 0, 0, 3, 2	6
10	(Germany) Valentin Grobauer	3, 2, 0, R, 0	5
11	(Hungary) Norbert Magosi	0, 1, 2, 0, 2	5
12	(Romania) Andrei Popa	0, 0, 1, 2, 0	3
13	(Bulgaria) Milen Manev	0, 0, 1, 1, 1	3
14	(Czech Republic) Jaroslav Vaníček	1, 1, 1, R, 0	3
15	(Germany) Mario Häusl	1, 1, X, 0, R	2
16	(Hungary) Zoltán Lovas (res)	1	1
17	(Hungary) Richárd Füzesi	0, 0, 0, 0, -	0

=== Q4 ===
- 17 May 2025
- (France) Piste de Speedway de Lamothe Landerron, Lamothe-Landerron

Pos.	Rider	Details	Points
1	(Poland) Szymon Woźniak	3, 2, 3, 3, 2	13
2	(Poland) Wiktor Przyjemski	3, 1, 2, 3, 3	12
3	(France) David Bellego	2, 3, 3, 2, 2	12
4	(Poland) Przemysław Pawlicki	R, 3, 3, 2, 3	11+3
5	(Sweden) Oliver Berntzon	3, 3, 1, 2, 2	11+2
6	(France) Steven Goret	2, 2, 3, 1, 3	11+1
7	(Denmark) Tim Sørensen	3, 3, 2, 0, 2	10
8	(Denmark) Jonas Jeppesen	1, 2, 2, 3, 1	9
9	(Latvia) Damirs Filmonovs	0, 1, 1, 3, 1	6
10	(Italy) Nicolas Vicentin	1, 2, 2, 1, X	6
11	(France) Mathias Tresarrieu	1, 1, 0, 0, 3	5
12	(United Kingdom) Jason Edwards	2, 0, 1, 2, 0	5
13	(Italy) Nicolo Percotti	2, 0, 0, 1, 1	4
14	(Germany) Richard Geyer	0, 1, 1, 1, 0	3
15	(Czech Republic) Matous Kamenik	1, 0, 0, 0, 1	2
16	(Latvia) Ernests Matjusonoks	R, 0, 0, 0, 0	0

=== SEC Challenge ===
The top five riders from the SEC Challenge qualified for the championship series.

Round	Date	Venue	Winner
SEC	31 May	(Germany) Paul Greifzu Stadium, Stralsund	(France) Dimitri Bergé

Pos.	Rider	Details	Points
1	(France) Dimitri Bergé	1, 2, 3, 3, 3	12+3
2	(Denmark) Michael Jepsen Jensen	3, 2, 3, 3, 1	12+2
3	(Ukraine) Nazar Parnitskyi	3, 2, 1, 3, 2	11
4	(Denmark) Frederik Jakobsen	1, 3, 2, 1, 3	10+3
5	(Poland) Mateusz Cierniak	3, 0, 2, 2, 3	10+2
6	(Poland) Przemysław Pawlicki	2, 3, 3, 2, X	10+R
7	(Poland) Szymon Woźniak	3, 1, 2, 2, 2	10+X
8	(Poland) Krzysztof Buczkowski	2, 1, 1, 1, 3	8
9	(Ukraine) Marko Levishyn	2, 3, 0, X, 1	6
10	(Poland) Bartłomiej Kowalski	X, 1, 3, 2, R	6
11	(Denmark) Rasmus Jensen	1, 1, 1, 3, 0	6
12	(France) David Bellego	R, 3, 0, 0, 2	5
13	(Czech Republic) Václav Milík Jr.	2, 0, 2, 1, 0	5
14	(Germany) Norick Blödorn	0, 2, 1, 0, 2	5
15	(Slovenia) Anže Grmek	1, 0, X, 1 ,1	3
16	(Poland) Wiktor Przyjemski	R, R, T, 0, 0	0
17	(Poland) / (Germany) Lars Skupień (res)	0	0

== Championship Series ==
=== Qualified riders ===
#	Riders	2024 place	SEC Ch place	Appearance
29	(Latvia) Andžejs Ļebedevs	1	-	9th
30	(Denmark) Leon Madsen	2	-	10th
223	(Poland) Kacper Woryna	3	-	6th
777	(Poland) Piotr Pawlicki	5	-	5th
692	(Poland) Patryk Dudek	6	-	6th
96	(France) Dimitri Bergé	13	1	4th
52	(Denmark) Michael Jepsen Jensen	-	2	5th
785	(Ukraine) Nazar Parnitskyi	-	3	1st
41	(Denmark) Frederik Jakobsen	-	4	2nd
842	(Poland) Mateusz Cierniak	-	5	1st
59	(Poland) Przemyslaw Pawlicki	-	6	4th
225	(Czech Republic) Václav Milík	18	13	11th
37	(Germany) Norick Blödorn	14	14	2nd
98	(Finland) / (Sweden) Timo Lahti	9	-	4th
27	(United Kingdom) Tom Brennan	20	-	1st

=== Qualified reserve ===
#	Riders	2024 place	SEC Ch place
48	(Poland) Szymon Woźniak	-	7
778	(Ukraine) Marko Levishyn	-	9
67	(Denmark) Rasmus Jensen	7	11
415	(France) David Bellego	-	12
226	(Slovenia) Anže Grmek	-	15

=== Wild cards and track reserve ===
Round	Wild card (16)	R1 (17)	R2 (18)
1	(Poland) Szymon Woźniak	(Poland) Robert Chmiel	(Poland) Emil Maroszek
2	(Germany) Kai Huckenbeck	(Germany) Valentin Grobauer	(Germany) Sandro Wassermann
3	(Poland) Grzegorz Zengota	(Poland) Antoni Mencel	(Poland) Emil Konieczny
4	(Czech Republic) Jan Kvěch	(Czech Republic) Jan Jeníček	(Czech Republic) Matouš Kameník

=== Results ===
The 2025 series was staged over four rounds.

Round	Date	Venue	Winner
1	12 July	(Poland) Józef Piłsudski Stadium, Bydgoszcz	(Poland) Patryk Dudek
2	26 July	(Germany) Güstrow Speedway Stadium, Güstrow	(Denmark) Leon Madsen
3	23 August	(Poland) Alfred Smoczyk Stadium, Leszno	(Poland) Patryk Dudek
4	19 September	(Czech Republic) Svítkov Stadium, Pardubice	(Poland) Patryk Dudek

== Final Classification ==
Pos.	Rider	Points	(Poland)	(Germany)	(Poland)	(Czech Republic)
1	(Poland) (692) Patryk Dudek (C)	56	15	13	14	14
2	(Latvia) (29) Andžejs Ļebedevs	48	12	9	15	12
3	(Denmark) (30) Leon Madsen	40	8	15	7	10
4	(Poland) (223) Kacper Woryna	39	15	9	6	9
5	(Ukraine) (785) Nazar Parnitskyi	37	7	9	12	9
6	(Denmark) (52) Michael Jepsen Jensen	33	12	6	9	6
7	(Poland) (48) Szymon Woźniak	30	10	4	7	9
8	(Sweden) (98) Timo Lahti	25	2	7	2	14
9	(France) (96) Dimitri Bergé	24	9	8	3	4
10	(Poland) (842) Mateusz Cierniak	24	8	3	7	6
11	(United Kingdom) (27) Tom Brennan	22	6	0	9	7
12	(Poland) (59) Przemyslaw Pawlicki	19	3	–	7	9
13	(Germany) (16) Kai Huckenbeck	16	–	16	–	–
14	(Czech Republic) (225) Václav Milík	16	1	–	6	9
15	(Germany) (37) Norick Blödorn	15	–	9	4	2
16	(Denmark) (67) Rasmus Jensen	14	7	7	–	–
17	(Poland) (16) Grzegorz Zengota	11	–	–	11	–
18	(Poland) (777) Piotr Pawlicki	9	–	–	7	2
19	(France) (415) David Bellego	7	–	7	–	–
20	(Denmark) (41) Frederik Jakobsen	7	7	–	–	–
21	(Ukraine) (778) Marko Levishyn	7	3	4	–	–
22	(Czech Republic) (16) Jan Kvěch	3	–	–	–	3
23	(Poland) (17) Robert Chmiel	1	1	–	–	–
24	(Poland) (18) Emil Maroszek	0	0	–	–	–
25	(Poland) (17) Antoni Mencel	0	–	–	0	–

== See also ==
- 2025 Speedway Grand Prix
- 2025 European Pairs Speedway Championship
- 2025 European Team Speedway Championship
- 2025 FIA World Rallycross Championship
