= 1998 Individual Speedway Junior European Championship =

Motorcycle racing competition

Seasons
- ← none 1999 →

The 1998 European Individual Speedway Junior Championship was the first edition of the Championship.

== Semi-finals ==
- Semi-Final A:
  - May 17, 1998
  - (Poland) Piła
- Semi-Final B:
  - May 17, 1998
  - (Croatia) Prelog

== Final ==
- July 18, 1998
- (Slovenia) Krško, Matija Gubec Stadium

Placing	Rider	Total	1	2	3	4	5	6	7	8	9	10	11	12	13	14	15	16	17	18	19	20	Pts	Pos	21
1	(Poland) (10) Rafał Okoniewski	15			3			3						3			3		3				15	1	
2	(Czech Republic) (7) Aleš Dryml, Jr.	13		3					3					1	3					3			13	2	
3	(Denmark) (13) Hans N. Andersen	12				3	3							2		1					3		12	4	3
4	(Poland) (9) Krzysztof Cegielski	12			2		2						3					3		2			12	5	2
5	(Denmark) (2) Charlie Gjedde	12	3					2				3				3				1			12	3	1
6	(Slovenia) (4) Ales Dolinar	9	1							3				0				2				3	9	6	
7	(Poland) (1) Mariusz Węgrzyk	8	2				1				3				1				1				8	7	
8	(Czech Republic) (5) Josef Franc	8		2			E					2					2					2	8	8	
9	(Sweden) (8) Freddie Eriksson	8		1						1			2			2			2				8	9	
10	(Poland) (15) Sebastian Smoter	6				2			2			1						1	0				6	10	
11	(Poland) (16) Paweł Duszyński	5				1				2	1						1			0			5	11	
12	(Poland) (14) Tomasz Chrzanowski	4				F		E					1		2							1	4	12	
13	(Croatia) (3) Krunoslav Zganec	3	0						1				0				0				2		3	13	
14	(Germany) (6) Stefan Katt	3		0				1			2							0			0		3	14	
15	(Hungary) (11) Sándor Fekete	1			1				F		E					0						0	1	15	
16	(Czech Republic) (12) Kvetoslaw Sebela	1			0					0		0			0						1		1	16	
Placing	Rider	Total	1	2	3	4	5	6	7	8	9	10	11	12	13	14	15	16	17	18	19	20	Pts	Pos	21

m - exclusion for exceeding two minute time allowance • t - exclusion for touching the tapes • x - other exclusion • e - retired or mechanical failure • f - fell • ns - non-starter • nc - non-classify

gate A - inside	gate B	gate C	gate D - outside
