= 2001 Individual Speedway Junior European Championship =

Motorcycle racing competition

Seasons
- ← 2000 2002 →

The 2001 European Individual Speedway Junior Championship was the fourth edition of the Championship.

== Qualification ==
- Semi-Final A:
  - May 20, 2001
  - (Sweden) Motala
- Semi-Final B:
  - June 10, 2001
  - (Ukraine) Rivne Speedway Stadium, Rivne
- Semi-Final C:
  - June 17, 2001
  - (Germany) Diedenbergen

== Final ==
- 5 or October 6, 2001 (?)
- (Czech Republic) Pardubice

Placing	Rider	Total	1	2	3	4	5	6	7	8	9	10	11	12	13	14	15	16	17	18	19	20	Pts	Pos	21
1	(Poland) (3) Łukasz Romanek	14	2						3				3				3				3		14	1	
2	(Poland) (5) Rafał Kurmański	13		2			3					3					2					3	13	2	3
3	(Sweden) (16) Daniel Davidsson	13				3				3	3						1			3			13	3	2
4	(Czech Republic) (1) Tomáš Suchánek	12	3				2				1				3				3				12	4	
5	(Denmark) (4) Kenneth Bjerre	9	1							1				3				3				1	9	5	
6	(Poland) (11) Zbigniew Czerwiński	9			1				2		2					2						2	9	6	
7	(Sweden) (14) Mattias Nilsson	8				2		3					1		2							0	8	7	
8	(Sweden) (10) Peter Ljung	7			3			2						1			0		1				7	8	
9	(Germany) (15) Matthias Schultz	7				1			1			1						2	2				7	9	
10	(Poland) (13) Krzysztof Kasprzak	6				0	0							2		3					1		6	10	
11	(Germany) (7) Hans Jorg Muller	5		3					0					0	X					2			5	11	
12	(Poland) (12) Łukasz Stanisławski	4			2					2		X			-						-		4	12	
13	(Denmark) (8) Niels Kristian Iversen	4		1						0			2			1			0				4	13	
14	(Czech Republic) (9) Miroslav Fencl	3			0		1						0					1		1			3	14	
15	(Denmark) (2) Sabrina Bogh	2	0					0				2				0				0			2	15	
16	(Russia) (6) Renat Gafurov	1		0				1			0							0			0		1	16	
R1	(Russia) (R1) Denis Gizatullin	1													1								1	R1	
R2	(Slovenia) (R2) Matej Žagar	2																			2		2	R2	
Placing	Rider	Total	1	2	3	4	5	6	7	8	9	10	11	12	13	14	15	16	17	18	19	20	Pts	Pos	21

m - exclusion for exceeding two minute time allowance • t - exclusion for touching the tapes • x - other exclusion • e - retired or mechanical failure • f - fell • ns - non-starter • nc - non-classify

gate A - inside	gate B	gate C	gate D - outside
