= Natschbach-Loipersbach =

- Municipality
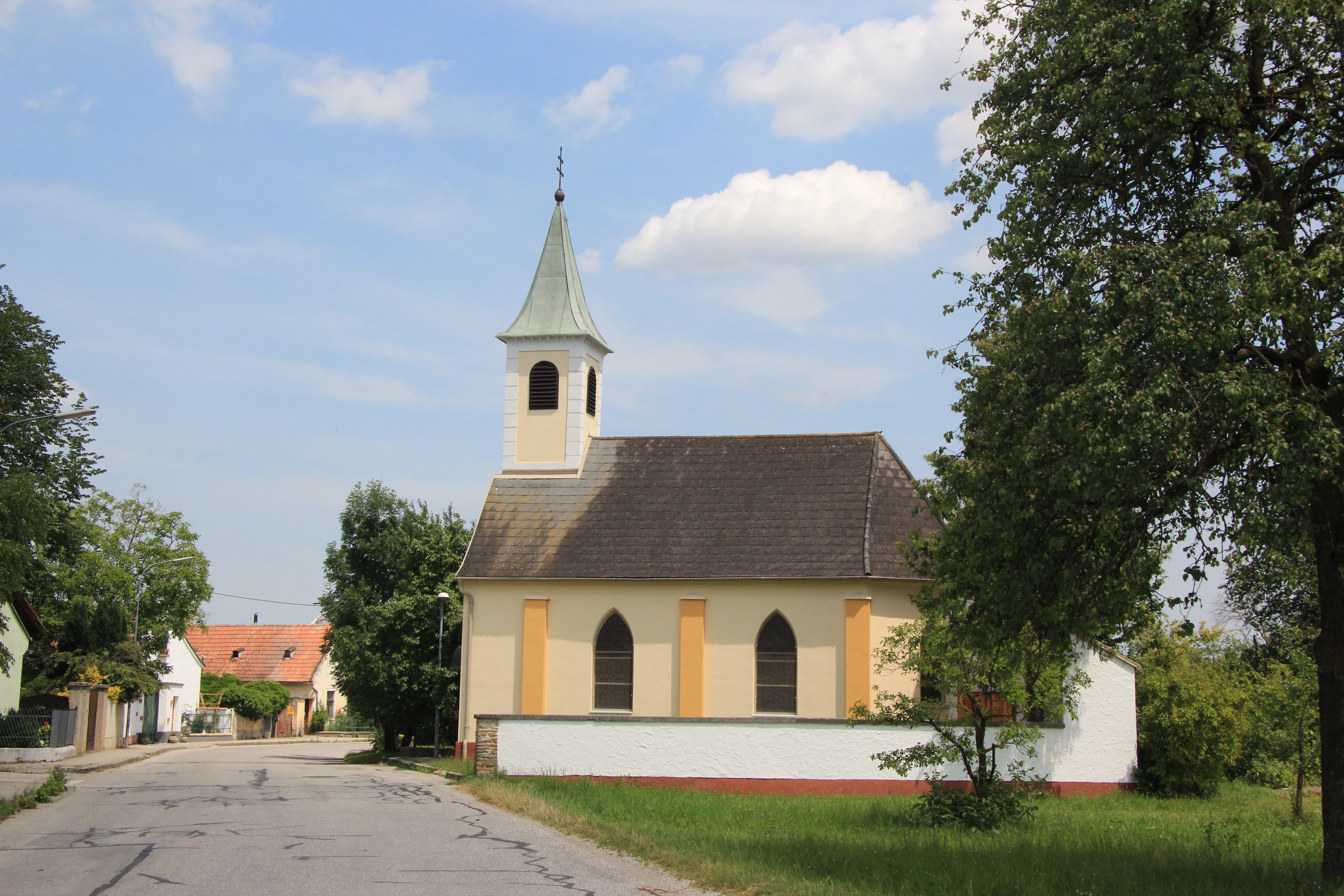
- Chapel in Loipersbach

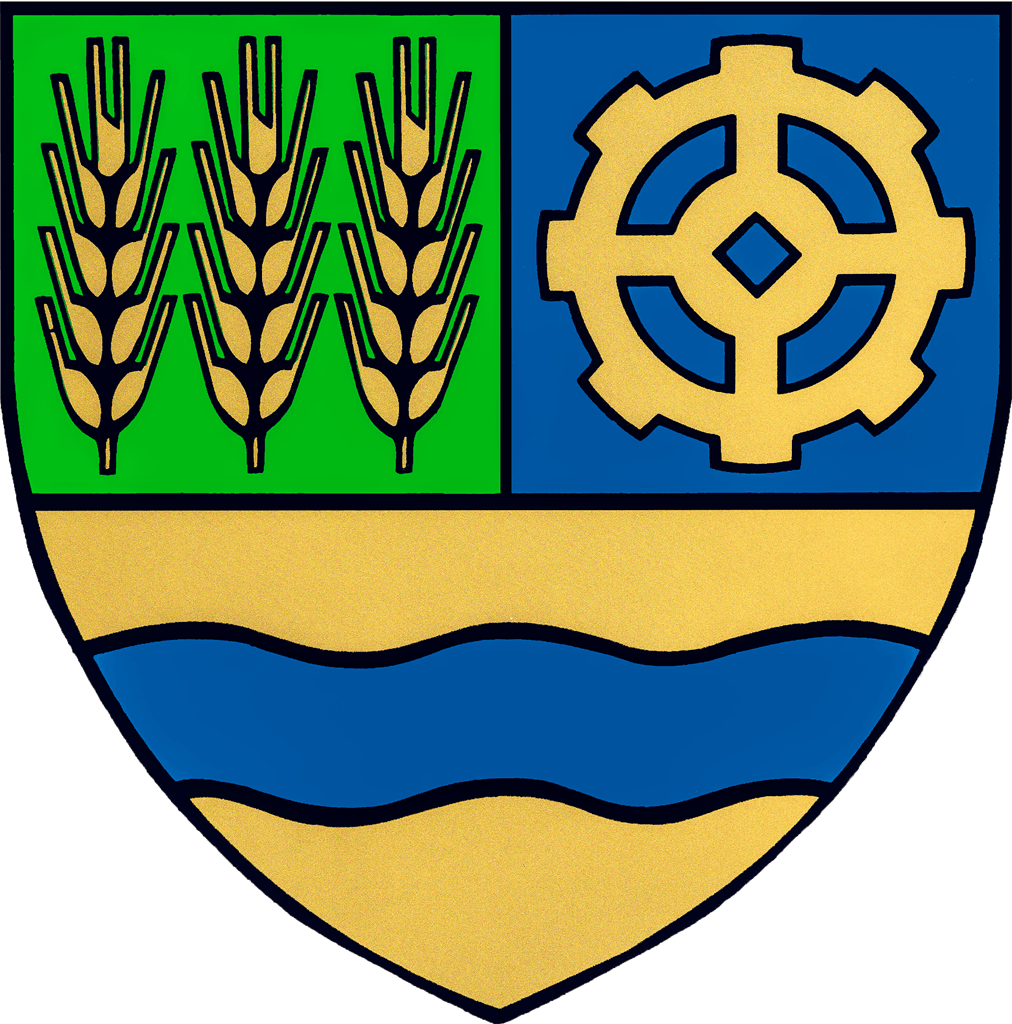
- Coat of arms

- Location within Austria
- Coordinates: 47°42′N 16°6′E
- Country: Austria
- State: Lower Austria
- District: Neunkirchen

Government
  - Mayor: Günther Stellwag

Area
  - Total: 10.62 km^{2} (4.10 sq mi)
- Elevation: 366 m (1,201 ft)

Population (2018-01-01)
  - Total: 1,702
  - Density: 160.3/km^{2} (415.1/sq mi)
- Time zone: UTC+1 (CET)
  - Summer (DST): UTC+2 (CEST)
- Postal code: 2620
- Area code: 02635

Natschbach-Loipersbach is a town in the district of Neunkirchen in the Austrian state of Lower Austria.

== Population ==
Historical population
| Year | Pop. | ±% |
|---|---|---|
| 1869 | 502 | — |
| 1880 | 511 | +1.8% |
| 1890 | 532 | +4.1% |
| 1900 | 498 | −6.4% |
| 1910 | 521 | +4.6% |
| 1923 | 513 | −1.5% |
| 1934 | 489 | −4.7% |
| 1939 | 511 | +4.5% |
| 1951 | 510 | −0.2% |
| 1961 | 457 | −10.4% |
| 1971 | 624 | +36.5% |
| 1981 | 1,115 | +78.7% |
| 1991 | 1,332 | +19.5% |
| 2001 | 1,537 | +15.4% |
| 2011 | 1,715 | +11.6% |
| 2014 | 1,727 | +0.7% |

== Sport ==
Speedway Natschbach-Loipersbach is a motorcycle speedway venue on Guntramserstraße 689/110, which is adjacent (on the south side) to the Schwarza river. The facility has hosted important events, including qualifying rounds of the Speedway World Championship (starting in 1988) and the 1989 Speedway Champions Cup.
