= Grudziądz Speedway Stadium =

Stadium in Grudziądz, Poland

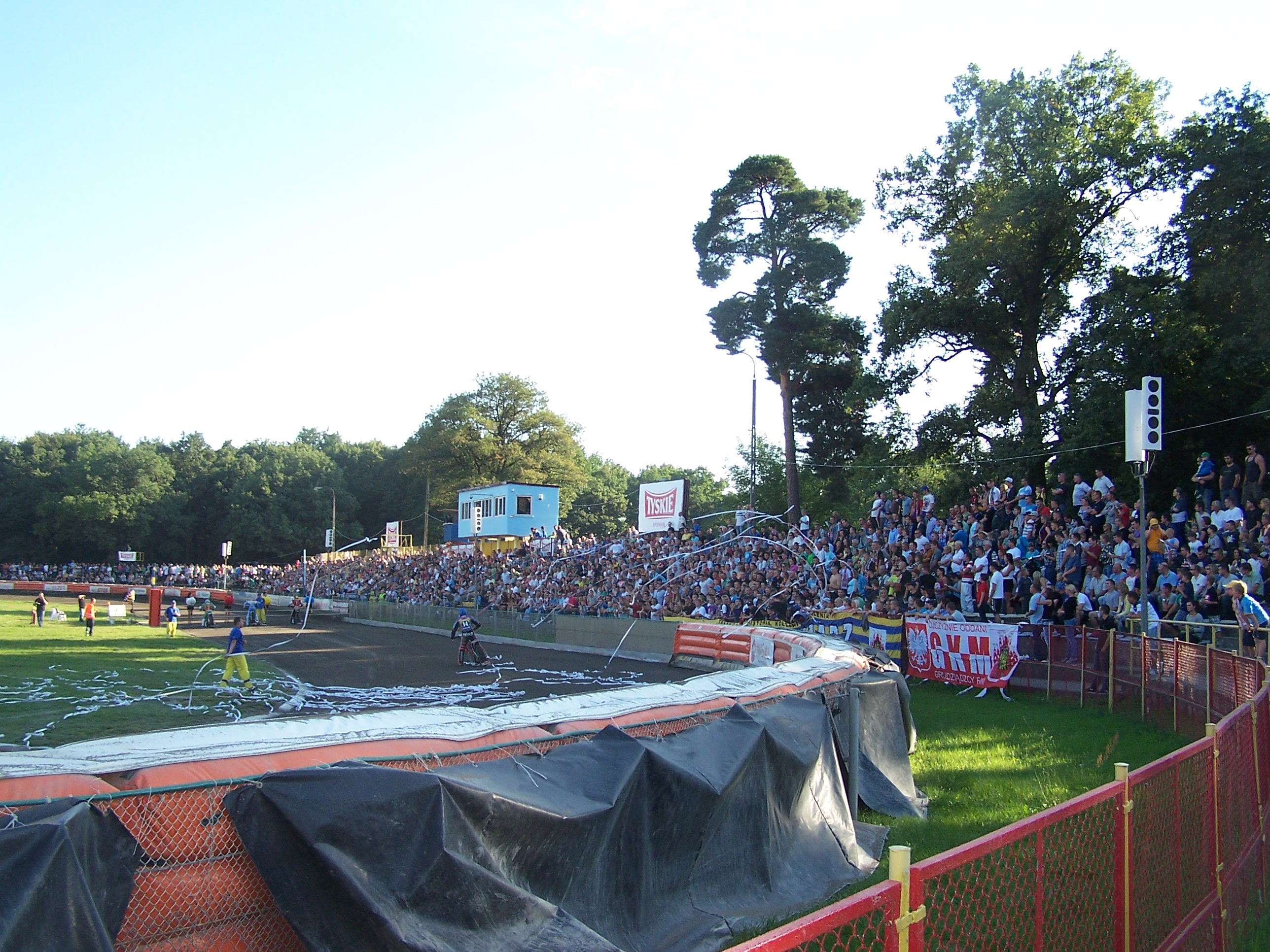
- A speedway match in 2011
- Location: Generała Józefa Hallera 4, 86-300 Grudziądz, Poland
- Coordinates: 53°28′23″N 18°45′40″E
- Capacity: 8,000
- Opened: Pre-World War II
- Website: https://www.gkm.grudziadz.net/stadion/
- Length: 0.355 km

The Grudziądz Speedway Stadium (Polish: Stadion Żużlowy w Grudziądzu) is a 8,000-capacity motorcycle speedway stadium in the south of Grudziądz in Poland.

The venue is used by the speedway team GKM Grudziądz, who compete in the Team Speedway Polish Championship.

== History ==
The stadium opened before World War II. After the war the stadium was used by the Nadwiślan football club. The speedway track was constructed later and opened on 26 September 1967. Many years later the football team Stomil Grudziądz used the pitch but they were dissolved in 1998 and the pitch was removed to be replaced by a mini speedway track.

In 2009, new seating was installed and from 2012 to 2018 renovation of the arena was carried out on an annual basis. The renovation included new track floodlights (2012), and the rebuilding of the northern section of the eastern stand (2015), east stand rebuild (2017) and the west stand rebuild (2018).

In 2019, the speedway track was reduced in size from 379 metres to 355 metres. The track record for the old 379 metres track was set by Maksim Bogdanovs on 2 August 2009 in a time of 64.41 seconds. On 23 June 2020, Artem Laguta set a new 355 metres track record of 64.97 seconds.
