= 2019 Team Speedway Junior World Championship =

Motorcycle racing competition

The 2019 Team Speedway Junior World Championship was the 15th FIM Team Under-21 World Championship season. The final took place on 12 July 2019 at the National Speedway Stadium in Manchester, England.

Poland won their 12th Team Under-21 World Championship, and their sixth in succession.

== Final ==
- (England) Manchester
- 12 July 2019

Pos.	National team	Pts.
1	Poland	41
2	Great Britain	33
3	Denmark	31
4	Australia	21

== Scores ==
(Poland)	POLAND	41
No	Rider Name	Pts.	Heats
1	Bartosz Smektała	13	3,3,3,3,1
2	Dominik Kubera	12	3,2,2,3,2
3	Maksym Drabik	11	3,3,2,2,1
4	Wiktor Lampart	5	0,3,2,0,0
5	Michał Gruchalski	-	DNS

(Denmark)	DENMARK	31
No	Rider Name	Pts.	Heats
1	Mads Hansen	11	1,1,3,2,2,2
2	Frederik Jakobsen	8	2,1,1,2,r,2
3	Patrick Hansen	6	2,1,0,3
4	Jonas Jeppesen	6	1,2,1,2

(United Kingdom)	GREAT BRITAIN	33
No	Rider Name	Pts.	Heats
1	Robert Lambert	20	2,3,6,3,3,3
2	Dan Bewley	11	3,1,2,3,1,1
3	Drew Kemp	2	1,0,1,0
4	Kyle Bickley	4	0,0,T
5	Leon Flint	0	0

(Australia)	AUSTRALIA	21
No	Rider Name	Pts.	Heats
1	Jaimon Lidsey	12	2,2,0,4,1,3
2	Jordan Stewart	5	0,2,0,0,3
3	Kyle Thomson	2	0,0,1,1
4	Matthew Gilmore	1	1,F,0
5	Zach Cook	1	1,0

== See also ==
- 2019 Speedway of Nations
- 2019 Individual Speedway Junior World Championship
