= 2018 Team Speedway Junior World Championship =

Motorcycle racing competition

The 2018 Team Speedway Junior World Championship was the 14th FIM Team Under-21 World Championship season. The final took place on 18 August, 2018 at the Outrup Stadium in Outrup, Denmark.

Poland won their 11th Team Under-21 World Championship, and their fifth in succession. The Poles accumulated 46 points, with Bartosz Smektała top scoring for them with 13 points. Hosts Denmark finished second with 42 points, with Great Britain in third on 29.

== Semi-finals ==
- (Poland) Rydze
- 14 July 2018

| National team | Pts |
|---|---|
| Poland | 56 |
| Sweden | 38 |
| Latvia | 21 |
| Finland | 6 |

- (United Kingdom) Glasgow
- 14 July 2018

| National team | Pts |
|---|---|
| Great Britain | 50 |
| Australia | 33 |
| Czech Republic | 26 |
| Germany | 13 |

== Final ==
- (Denmark) Outrup
- 18 August 2018

| Pos. | National team | Pts. |
|---|---|---|
| 1 | Poland | 46 |
| 2 | Denmark | 42 |
| 3 | Great Britain | 29 |
| 4 | Sweden | 4 |

== Scores ==
| (Poland) | POLAND | 46 |
| No | Rider Name | Pts. | Heats |
| 1 | Rafał Karczmarz | 0 | W |
| 2 | Daniel Kaczmarek | 11 | 3,3,3,2,- |
| 3 | Maksym Drabik | 11 | 2,2,3,2,2 |
| 4 | Bartosz Smektała | 13 | 3,3,3,2,2 |
| 5 | Wiktor Lampart | 11 | 3,2,2,3,1 |

| (Denmark) | DENMARK | 42 |
| No | Rider Name | Pts. | Heats |
| 1 | Christian Thaysen | 6 | 2,-,2,-,2 |
| 2 | Patrick Hansen | 9 | 3,1,2,3,W |
| 3 | Andreas Lyager | 12 | 3,1,2,3,3 |
| 4 | Frederik Jakobsen | 13 | 2,2,3,3,3 |
| 5 | Jonas Seifert-Salk | 2 | 1,1 |

| (United Kingdom) | GREAT BRITAIN | 29 |
| No | Rider Name | Pts. | Heats |
| 1 | Dan Bewley | 13 | 1,3,1,2,3,3 |
| 2 | Ellis Perks | 4 | 1,2,0,-,1 |
| 3 | Zach Wajtknecht | 7 | 2,1,1,1,2 |
| 4 | Nathan Greaves | 4 | 1,2,D,-,1 |
| 5 | Connor Mountain | 1 | 1 |

| (Sweden) | SWEDEN | 4 |
| No | Rider Name | Pts. | Heats |
| 1 | Anton Karlsson | 1 | T,0,1,0,0 |
| 2 | Henrik Bergström | 0 | 0,0,0,-,0 |
| 3 | Emil Millberg | 2 | 0,D,2,0,W |
| 4 | Robin Norman | 1 | 1,-,0,0 |
| 5 | William Björling | 0 | 0,0,0 |

== See also ==
- 2018 Speedway of Nations
- 2018 Individual Speedway Junior World Championship
