= 2017 Team Speedway Junior World Championship =

Motorcycle racing competition

The 2017 Team Speedway Junior World Championship was the 13th FIM Team Under-21 World Championship season. The final took place on 2 September, 2017 in Rybnik, Poland.

Hosts Poland won their tenth Team Under-21 World Championship, and their fourth in succession. The Poles accumulated 47 points, with Bartosz Smektała top scoring for them with 14 points. Australia finished second with 37 points, with Denmark in third on 27.

== Semi-finals ==
- (Germany) Pocking
- 3 June 2017

National team	Pts
Australia	47
Great Britain	40
Germany	33
Germany 2	2

- (Denmark) Esbjerg
- 3 June 2017

National team	Pts
Denmark	24
Sweden	17
Czech Republic	11
Norway	8

== Final ==
- (Poland) Rybnik
- 2 September 2017

Pos.	National team	Pts.
1	Poland	47
2	Australia	37
3	Denmark	27
4	Great Britain	13

== Scores ==
(Poland)	POLAND	47
No	Rider Name	Pts.	Heats
1	Bartosz Smektała	14	3,3,3,3,2
2	Kacper Woryna	10	2,D,2,3,3
3	Maksym Drabik	13	3,1,3,3,3
4	Dominik Kubera	10	2,1,3,2,2
5	Rafał Karczmarz	DNR

(Australia)	AUSTRALIA	37
No	Rider Name	Pts.	Heats
1	Jack Holder	12	2,3,3,2,2
2	Max Fricke	7	3,0,1,2,1
3	Josh Pickering	6	1,3,0,1,1
4	Brady Kurtz	12	3,2,1,3,3
5	Jaimon Lidsey	DNR

(Denmark)	DENMARK	27
No	Rider Name	Pts.	Heats
1	Jonas Jeppesen	3	0,1,2,0,-
2	Andreas Lyager	4	1,1,2,0,-
3	Mikkel B. Andersen	6	0,3,1,-,1,1
4	Patrick Hansen	1	0,-,-,-,1
5	Frederik Jakobsen	13	2,4,2,3,2

(United Kingdom)	GREAT BRITAIN	13
No	Rider Name	Pts.	Heats
1	Robert Lambert	9	1,2,4,1,1,0
2	Adam Ellis	2	2,0,0,0,0
3	Josh Bates	1	1,0,0,0,0
4	Daniel Bewley	0	D,-,0
5	Ellis Perks	1	1,0

== See also ==
- 2017 Speedway World Cup
- 2017 Individual Speedway Junior World Championship
