= 2019 Speedway Under-21 World Championship =

World motorcycle speedway event

World Under-21 Championship

The 2019 Individual Speedway Under 21 World Championship was the 43rd edition of the FIM Individual Under-21 World Championship. It was staged over three rounds, at Lublin, Güstrow and Pardubice.

Poland's Bartosz Smektała was the defending champion having won the title in 2018 but it was fellow Pole Maksym Drabik that won the title, to become the third rider in history to win the event twice.

== Final series ==
No.	Date	Venue	Winner	Runner-up	3rd place
1	22 June	(Poland) Stadion MOSiR Bystrzyca, Lublin	(Russia) Gleb Chugunov	(Poland) Bartosz Smektała	(United Kingdom) Robert Lambert
2	13 September	(Germany) Güstrow Speedway Stadium, Güstrow	(Poland) Dominik Kubera	(Poland) Maksym Drabik	(Czech Republic) Jan Kvěch
3	4 October	(Czech Republic) Svítkov Stadium, Pardubice	(Russia) Gleb Chugunov	(Poland) Bartosz Smektała	(Poland) Maksym Drabik

== Classification ==
The meeting classification is according to the points scored during the meeting, with the total points scored by each rider during each meeting credited as World Championship points. The FIM Speedway Under 21 World Champion will be the rider who collects the most World Championship points at the end of the series.

Pos.	Rider	Points	(Poland)	(Germany)	(Czech Republic)
Gold	(Poland) Maksym Drabik	49	16	19	14
Silver	(Poland) Bartosz Smektała	45	13	15	17
Bronze	(Poland) Dominik Kubera	45	17	19	9
4	(Russia) Gleb Chugunov	39	17	9	13
5	(United Kingdom) Robert Lambert	32	14	7	11
6	(Czech Republic) Jan Kvěch	30	8	12	10
7	(Australia) Jaimon Lidsey	29	8	6	15
8	(Denmark) Jonas Jeppesen	26	8	7	11
9	(Poland) Wiktor Lampart	24	11	9	4
10	(Denmark) Frederik Jakobsen	20	6	6	8
11	(Denmark) Patrick Hansen	15	4	3	8
12	(Poland) Rafał Karczmarz	13	2	4	7
13	(Denmark) Tim Sørensen	12	1	8	3
14	(Slovenia) Nick Škorja	10	7	1	2
15	(Germany) Michael Hartel	8	–	8	–
16	(Czech Republic) Petr Chlupáč	6	–	–	6
17	(Poland) Viktor Trofimov Jr.	5	5	–	–
18	(Germany) Dominik Möser	3	0	3	0
19	(Germany) Lukas Baumann	2	–	2	–
20	(Poland) Kamil Nowacki	0	0	–	–
21	(Poland) Mateusz Cierniak	0	0	–	–
22	(Germany) Leon Arnheim	0	–	0	–

== See also ==
- 2019 Speedway Grand Prix
- 2019 Team Speedway Junior World Championship
