= 2017 Speedway Under-21 World Championship =

World motorcycle speedway event

World Under-21 Championship
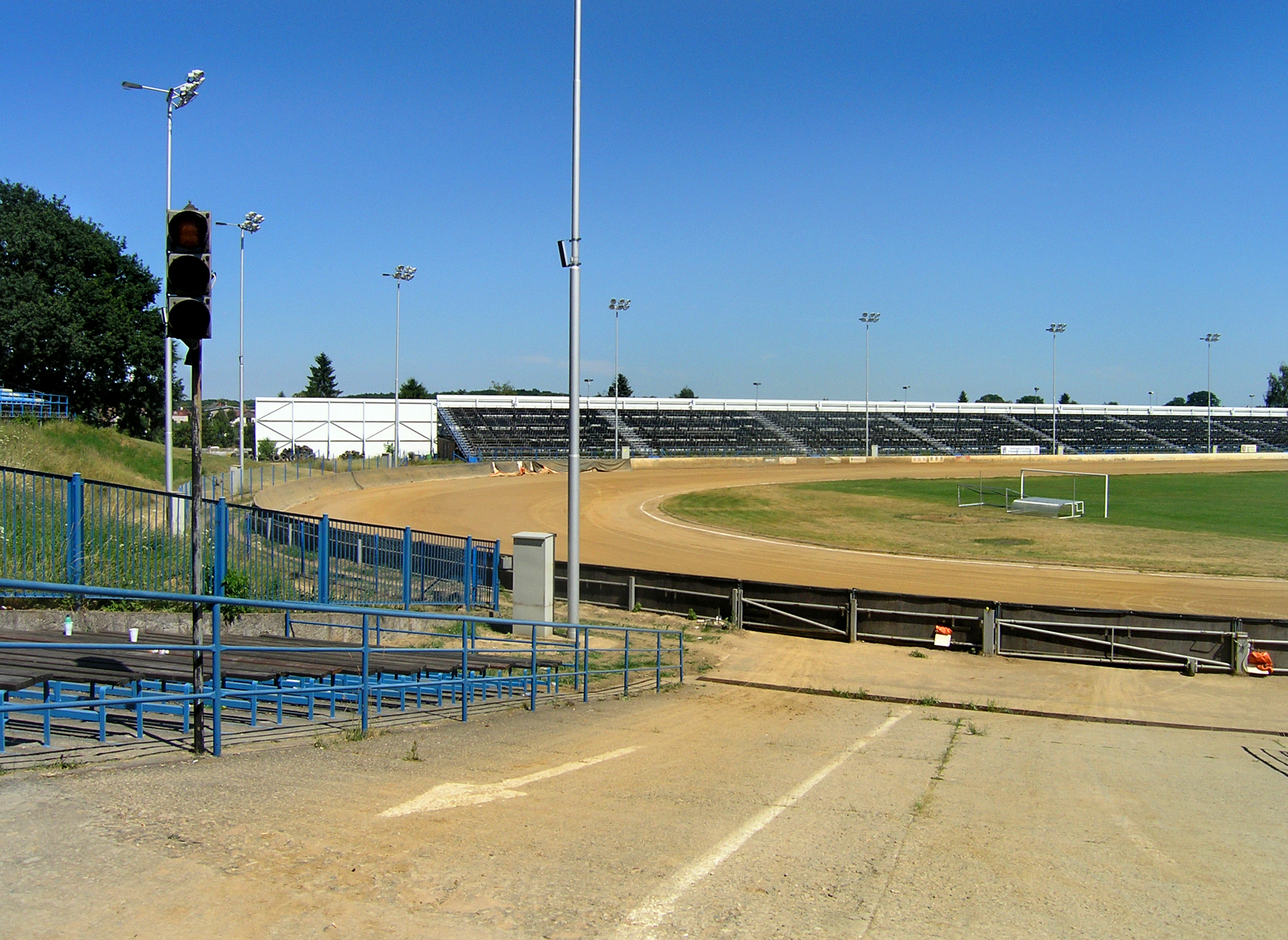
- Pardubice hosted a final round of the Championship for the fourth consecutive year.

The 2017 Individual Speedway Under 21 World Championship was the 41st edition of the FIM Individual Under-21 World Championship and was staged over three rounds, at Poznań, Güstrow and Pardubice.

Maksym Drabik of Poland won the title.

== Final series ==
No.	Date	Venue	Winner	Runner-up	3rd place
1	23 July	(Poland) Golęcin Speedway Stadium, Poznań	(Poland) Maksym Drabik	(Poland) Bartosz Smektała	(Latvia) Jevgeņijs Kostigovs
2	8 September	(Germany) Güstrow Speedway Stadium, Güstrow	(Poland) Bartosz Smektała	(United Kingdom) Robert Lambert	(Australia) Brady Kurtz
3	29 September	(Czech Republic) Svítkov Stadium, Pardubice	(Poland) Maksym Drabik	(Poland) Kacper Woryna	(Australia) Max Fricke

== Classification ==
The meeting classification was according to the points scored during the meeting, with the total points scored by each rider during each meeting credited as World Championship points. The FIM Speedway Under 21 World Champion was the rider who collected most World Championship points at the end of the series. In case of a tie between one or more riders in the final overall classification, a run-off decided the 1st, 2nd and 3rd places. For all other placings, the better-placed rider in the last meeting was the better placed rider.

Pos.	Rider	Points	(Poland)	(Germany)	(Czech Republic)
Gold	(Poland) Maksym Drabik	49	21	10	18
Silver	(Poland) Bartosz Smektała	42	15	15	12
Bronze	(Australia) Max Fricke	41	15	13	13
4	(Poland) Kacper Woryna	33	5	11	17
5	(Australia) Brady Kurtz	32	6	18	8
6	(Australia) Jack Holder	28	11	6	11
7	(United Kingdom) Robert Lambert	27	9	15	3
8	(France) Dimitri Bergé	25	5	9	11
9	(Denmark) Andreas Lyager	25	8	11	6
10	(Latvia) Jevgeņijs Kostigovs	24	11	4	9
11	(Czech Republic) Eduard Krčmář	20	5	6	9
12	(Poland) Dominik Kubera	19	10	7	2
13	(Denmark) Patrick Hansen	15	4	3	8
14	(Sweden) Alexander Woentin	12	3	5	4
15	(Germany) Lukas Fienhage	11	3	1	7
16	(Poland) Rafał Karczmarz	4	4	–	–
16	(Germany) Michael Hartel	4	–	4	–
18	(Poland) Damian Dróżdż	1	1	–	–
18	(Poland) Alex Zgardziński	1	1	–	–
20	(Germany) Dominik Moeser	0	–	0	–
20	(Czech Republic) Patrik Mikel	0	–	–	0

== See also ==
- 2017 Speedway Grand Prix
- 2017 Team Speedway Junior World Championship
