= Speedway Under-21 World Championship =

Annual motorcycle speedway championship

- Sport: motorcycle speedway
- Founded: 1977
- Most recent champion: Mikkel Andersen
- Most titles: 2 titles: Darcy Ward; Emil Sayfutdinov; Maksym Drabik; Mateusz Cierniak

The Speedway Under-21 World Championship is an annual speedway event held each year organized by the International Motorcycling Federation (FIM) since 1977.

As of 2022, the title was awarded to the winner of the SGP2 category at the FIM Speedway World Championship.

== History ==
Between 1977 and 1987 the Championship was called the Individual Speedway Junior European Championship (European Speedway Under 21 Championship), open only to European riders. In 1979, the Championship began allowing riders from other continents to compete, but was renamed to the Speedway World Under 21 Championship in 1988. In 1998, European Motorcycle Union (UEM) established the Individual Speedway Junior European Championship, a new competition open only to European competitors.

Originally it was called the European Under-21 Championship (from 1977-1987) but changed its name in 1988 when it was made open to all nations. To confuse matters a new European Individual Speedway Junior Championship was created in 1998 by the European Motorcycle Union (UEM) but this is not linked to former European Under-21 Championship.

Emil Sayfutdinov (2007, 2008) became the first rider to win the championship twice. Other double champions include Darcy Ward (2009, 2010), Maksym Drabik (2017, 2019), and Mateusz Cierniak (2022, 2023).

== Age limits ==
Riders must be at least 16 years old to compete, starting from their 16th birthday. The maximum age limit is 21, with eligibility ending at the conclusion of the year in which the rider turns 21.

== Past winners ==
=== European Championship (1977-1987) ===
Year	Venue	Winners	Runner-up	3rd place
1977	(Denmark) Vojens	(Denmark) Alf Busk (9 pts)	(United Kingdom) Joe Owen (8 pts)	(United Kingdom) Les Collins (7 pts)
1978	(Italy) Lonigo	(Denmark) Finn Rune Jensen (13 pts)	(United Kingdom) Kevin Jolly (12+3 pts)	(United Kingdom) Neil Middleditch (12+2 pts)
1979	(Soviet Union) Leningrad	(United States) Ron Preston (13 pts)	(Soviet Union) Airat Faizulin (12 pts)	(Finland) Ari Koponen (11+3 pts)
1980	(Germany) Pocking	(Denmark) Tommy Knudsen (14 pts)	(New Zealand) Tony Briggs (12 pts)	(United States) Dennis Sigalos (11+3 pts)
1981	(Czechoslovakia) Slaný	(United States) Shawn Moran (15 pts)	(Czechoslovakia) Antonín Kasper Jr. (14 pts)	(Czechoslovakia) Jiří Hnidak (13 pts)
1982	(Germany) Pocking	(Czechoslovakia) Antonín Kasper Jr. (14 pts)	(United Kingdom) Mark Courtney (12+3 pts)	(Denmark) Peter Ravn (12+2 pts)
1983	(Italy) Lonigo	(Australia) Steve Baker (13 pts)	(New Zealand) David Bargh (12 pts)	(United Kingdom) Marvyn Cox (11 pts)
1984	(England) King's Lynn	(United Kingdom) Marvyn Cox (12 pts)	(United Kingdom) Neil Evitts (11+3 pts)	(United States) Steve Lucero (11+2 pts)
1985	(Germany) Abensberg	(Sweden) Per Jonsson (15 pts)	(Sweden) Jimmy Nilsen (13 pts)	(Denmark) Ole Hansen (11+3pts)
1986	(Soviet Union) Rivne	(Soviet Union) Igor Marko (13 pts)	(Sweden) Tony Olsson (12 pts)	(Denmark) Brian Karger (11 pts)
1987	(Poland) Zielona Góra	(United Kingdom) Gary Havelock (13 pts)	(Poland) Piotr Świst (12+3 pts)	(United Kingdom) Sean Wilson (12+2 pts)

=== World Championship (since 1988) ===
==== One-day final (1988–2009) ====
Year	Venue	Winners	Runner-up	3rd place
1988	(Czechoslovakia) Slaný	(Sweden) Peter Nahlin (14 pts)	(Sweden) Henrik Gustafsson (11+3 pts)	(Denmark) Brian Karger (11+2 pts)
1989	(Italy) Lonigo	(Denmark) Gert Handberg (13+3 pts)	(United Kingdom) Chris Louis (13+2 pts)	(Sweden) Niklas Karlsson (12 pts)
1990	(Soviet Union) Lviv	(United Kingdom) Chris Louis (14 pts)	(Soviet Union) Rene Aas (13 pts)	(Sweden) Tony Rickardsson (10+3 pts)
1991	(England) Coventry	(Denmark) Brian Andersen (14+3 pts)	(Denmark) Morten Andersen (14+2 pts)	(Australia) Jason Lyons (11 pts)
1992	(Germany) Pfaffenhofen an der Ilm	(Australia) Leigh Adams (14+3 pts)	(United Kingdom) Mark Loram (14+2 pts)	(United Kingdom) Joe Screen (13 pts)
1993	(Czech Republic) Pardubice	(United Kingdom) Joe Screen (14+3 pts)	(Sweden) Mikael Karlsson (14+2 pts)	(Norway) Rune Holta (10+3 pts)
1994	(Norway) Elgane	(Sweden) Mikael Karlsson (14+3 pts)	(Norway) Rune Holta (14+2 pts)	(Australia) Jason Crump (12+3 pts)
1995	(Finland) Tampere	(Australia) Jason Crump (13+3 pts)	(Sweden) Daniel Andersson (13+F pts)	(Australia) Ryan Sullivan (12+3 pts)
1996	(Germany) Olching	(Poland) Piotr Protasiewicz (15 pts)	(Australia) Ryan Sullivan (11+3 pts)	(Denmark) Jesper B. Jensen (11+2 pts)
1997	(Czech Republic) Mšeno	(Denmark) Jesper B. Jensen (14 pts)	(Poland) Rafał Dobrucki (11+3 pts)	(United Kingdom) Scott Nicholls (11+2 pts)
1998	(Poland) Piła	(Poland) Robert Dados (14+3 pts)	(Poland) Krzysztof Jabłoński (14+2 pts)	(Slovenia) Matej Ferjan (12 pts)
1999	(Denmark) Vojens	(United Kingdom) Lee Richardson (13 pts)	(Czech Republic) Aleš Dryml, Jr. (11 pts)	(Australia) Nigel Sadler (10+3+2 pts)
2000	(Poland) Gorzów Wlkp.	(Sweden) Andreas Jonsson (14 pts)	(Poland) Krzysztof Cegielski (11+3 pts)	(Poland) Jarosław Hampel (11+2 pts)
2001	(England) Peterborough	(Poland) Dawid Kujawa (12 pts)	(Czech Republic) Lukáš Dryml (11 pts)	(Poland) Rafał Okoniewski (10+3 pts)
2002	(Czech Republic) Slaný	(Czech Republic) Lukáš Dryml (14+3 pts)	(Poland) Krzysztof Kasprzak (14+2 pts)	(United Kingdom) David Howe (12 pts)
2003	(Sweden) Kumla	(Poland) Jarosław Hampel (14 pts)	(United Kingdom) Chris Harris (13 pts)	(Poland) Rafał Szombierski (11+3 pts)
2004	(Poland) Wrocław	(Poland) Robert Miśkowiak (12 pts +2 +2)	(Denmark) Kenneth Bjerre (8 pts +3 +2)	(Slovenia) Matej Žagar (8 pts +2 +1)
2005	(Austria) Wiener Neustadt	(Poland) Krzysztof Kasprzak (8 pts)	(Czech Republic) Tomáš Suchánek (8 pts)	(Sweden) Fredrik Lindgren (7 pts)
2006	(Italy) Terenzano	(Poland) Karol Ząbik (13 pts +3)	(Sweden) Antonio Lindbäck (12 pts +2)	(Germany) Christian Hefenbrock (12 pts +1)
2007	(Poland) Ostrów Wlkp.	(Russia) Emil Sayfutdinov (15 pts)	(Australia) Chris Holder (14 pts)	(Poland) Paweł Hlib (12 pts)
2008	(Czech Republic) Pardubice	(Russia) Emil Sayfutdinov (14 pts)	(Australia) Chris Holder (12+3 pts)	(Croatia) Jurica Pavlic (12+2 pts)
2009	(Croatia) Goričan	(Australia) Darcy Ward (13 pts)	(Croatia) Jurica Pavlic (12+3 pts)	(Denmark) Patrick Hougaard (12+2 pts)

==== Final series (since 2010–2021) ====
Year	Venue	Winners	Runner-up	3rd place
2010	three events	(Australia) Darcy Ward (30+3 pts)	(Poland) Maciej Janowski (30+2 pts)	(Latvia) Maksims Bogdanovs (30+1 pts)
2011	four events	(Poland) Maciej Janowski (50 pts)	(Australia) Darcy Ward (46+3 pts)	(Poland) Przemysław Pawlicki (46+2 pts)
2012	seven events	(Denmark) Michael Jepsen Jensen (90 pts)	(Poland) Maciej Janowski (89 pts)	(Denmark) Mikkel Bech Jensen (75 pts)
2013	three events	(Poland) Patryk Dudek (35 pts)	(Poland) Piotr Pawlicki Jr. (34 pts)	(Poland) Kacper Gomólski (29 pts)
2014	three events	(Poland) Piotr Pawlicki Jr. (42 pts)	(Poland) Kacper Gomolski (36 pts)	(Denmark) Mikkel Michelsen (33 pts)
2015	three events	(Poland) Bartosz Zmarzlik (39 pts)	(Denmark) Anders Thomsen (34 pts)	(Denmark) Mikkel Michelsen (34 pts)
2016	three events	(Australia) Max Fricke (46 pts)	(Poland) Krystian Pieszczek (40 pts)	(United Kingdom) Robert Lambert (37+3 pts)
2017	three events	(Poland) Maksym Drabik (49 pts)	(Poland) Bartosz Smektała (42 pts)	(Australia) Max Fricke (41 pts)
2018	three events	(Poland) Bartosz Smektała (56 pts)	(Poland) Maksym Drabik (54 pts)	(United Kingdom) Robert Lambert (46 pts)
2019	three events	(Poland) Maksym Drabik (49 pts)	(Poland) Bartosz Smektała (45+3 pts)	(Poland) Dominik Kubera (45+2 pts)
2020	one event	(Australia) Jaimon Lidsey (20 pts)	(Poland) Dominik Kubera (16 pts)	(Latvia) Oļegs Mihailovs (14 pts)
2021	three events	(Poland) Jakub Miśkowiak (58 pts)	(Denmark) Mads Hansen (54 pts)	(Poland) Wiktor Lampart (40 pts)

==== SGP2 (2022–) ====
Year	Venue	Winners	Runner-up	3rd place
2022	three events	(Poland) Mateusz Cierniak (56 pts)	(Czech Republic) Jan Kvěch (39 pts)	(Poland) Jakub Miśkowiak (38 pts)
2023	three events	(Poland) Mateusz Cierniak (49 pts)	(Poland) Damian Ratajczak (45 pts)	(Poland) Bartłomiej Kowalski (42 pts)
2024	three events	(Poland) Wiktor Przyjemski (56 pts)	(Ukraine) Nazar Parnitskyi (46 pts)	(Norway) Mathias Pollestad (43 pts)
2025	three events	(Ukraine) Nazar Parnitskyi (52 pts)	(Poland) Wiktor Przyjemski (42 pts)	(Denmark) Mikkel Andersen (36 pts)
2026	three events	(Denmark) Mikkel Andersen (46 pts)	(Denmark) Nicolai Heiselberg (42 pts)	(Poland) Wiktor Przyjemski (38 pts)

== Statistics ==
=== Medal winners per nation ===
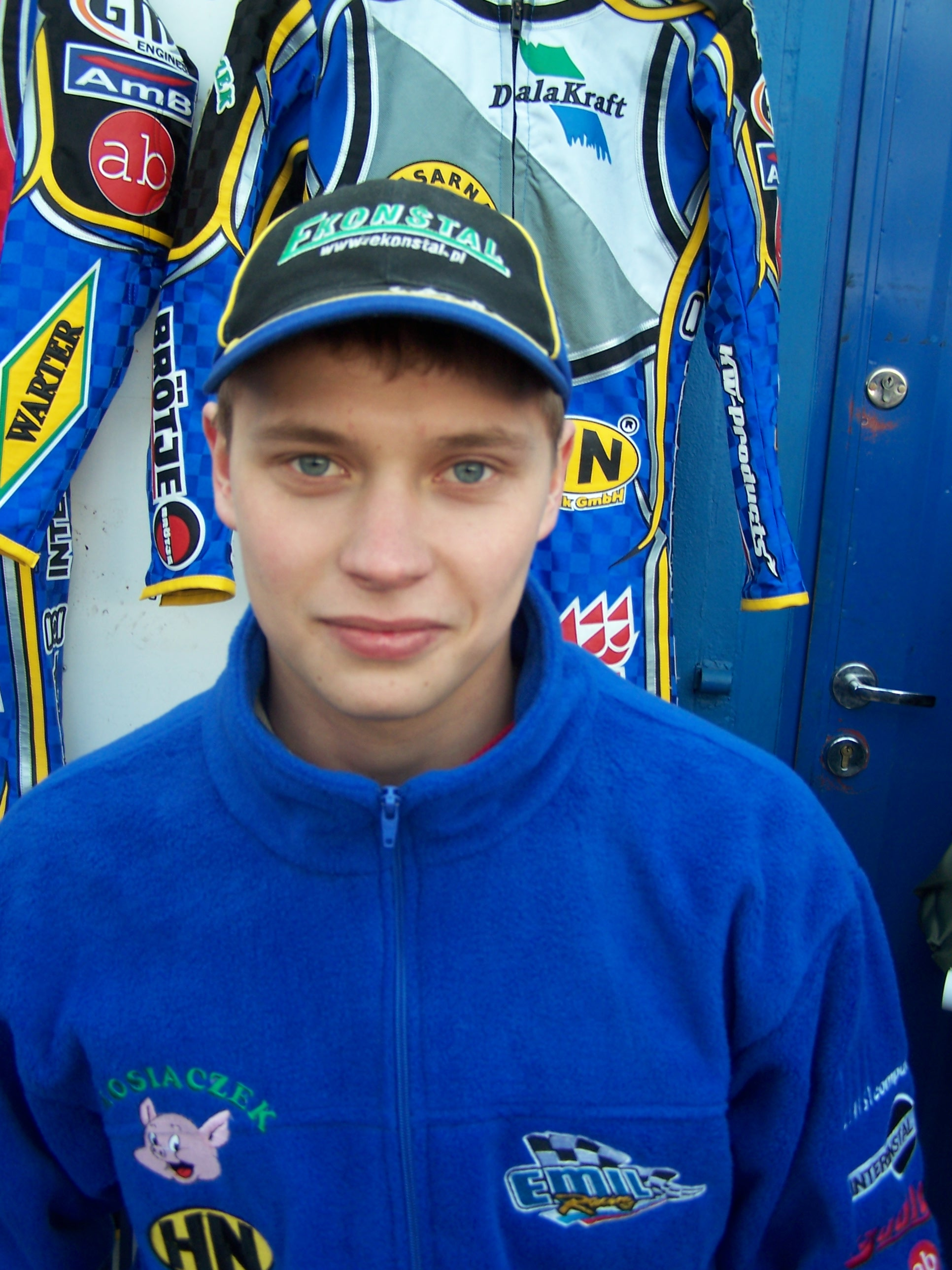
2007 and 2008 Under-21 World Champion Emil Sayfutdinov (photo 2008).

Pos	National Team	Gold	Silver	Bronze	Total
1.	Poland	18	16	11	45
2.	Denmark	8	5	10	23
3.	Australia	7	4	5	16
4.	Great Britain	5	7	9	21
5.	Sweden	4	6	3	13
6.	Soviet Union; Russia	3	2	0	5
7.	Czechoslovakia; Czech Republic	2	5	1	8
8.	United States	2	0	2	4
9.	Ukraine	1	1	0	2
10.	New Zealand	0	2	0	2
11.	Norway	0	1	2	3
12.	Croatia	0	1	1	2
13.	Slovenia	0	0	2	2
	Latvia	0	0	2	2
15.	Finland	0	0	1	1
	Germany	0	0	1	1

=== World champions ===
The following World Junior champions went on to win the Speedway World Championship.

- Per Jonsson in 1990
- Gary Havelock in 1992
- Jason Crump in 2004, 2006 and 2009
- Bartosz Zmarzlik in 2019, 2020, 2022, 2023, 2024 and 2025

== See also ==
- Team Speedway Junior World Championship (U-21)
- Individual Speedway World Championship, Speedway Grand Prix
- Individual Speedway Junior European Championship (U-19)
