= East of England Showground =

Venue in Peterborough, Cambridgeshire, England

- Interactive map of East of England Showground
- Address: East of England Way, Alwalton; Peterborough; England
- Coordinates: 52°32′45″N 0°19′05″W
- Owner: East of England Agricultural Society

The East of England Showground was a large showground area (667,731sqm) located on East of England Way near Peterborough, Cambridgeshire, England. The Showground is owned by Bellway as of around 2019 and the site currently includes the East of England Arena and Events Centre and a motorcycle speedway stadium. In September 2021, EEAS entered into a land promotion agreement with Asset Earning Power Group (AEPG). The purpose of the agreement was to develop new leisure facilities on the site and further the association with the Anglia Ruskin University.

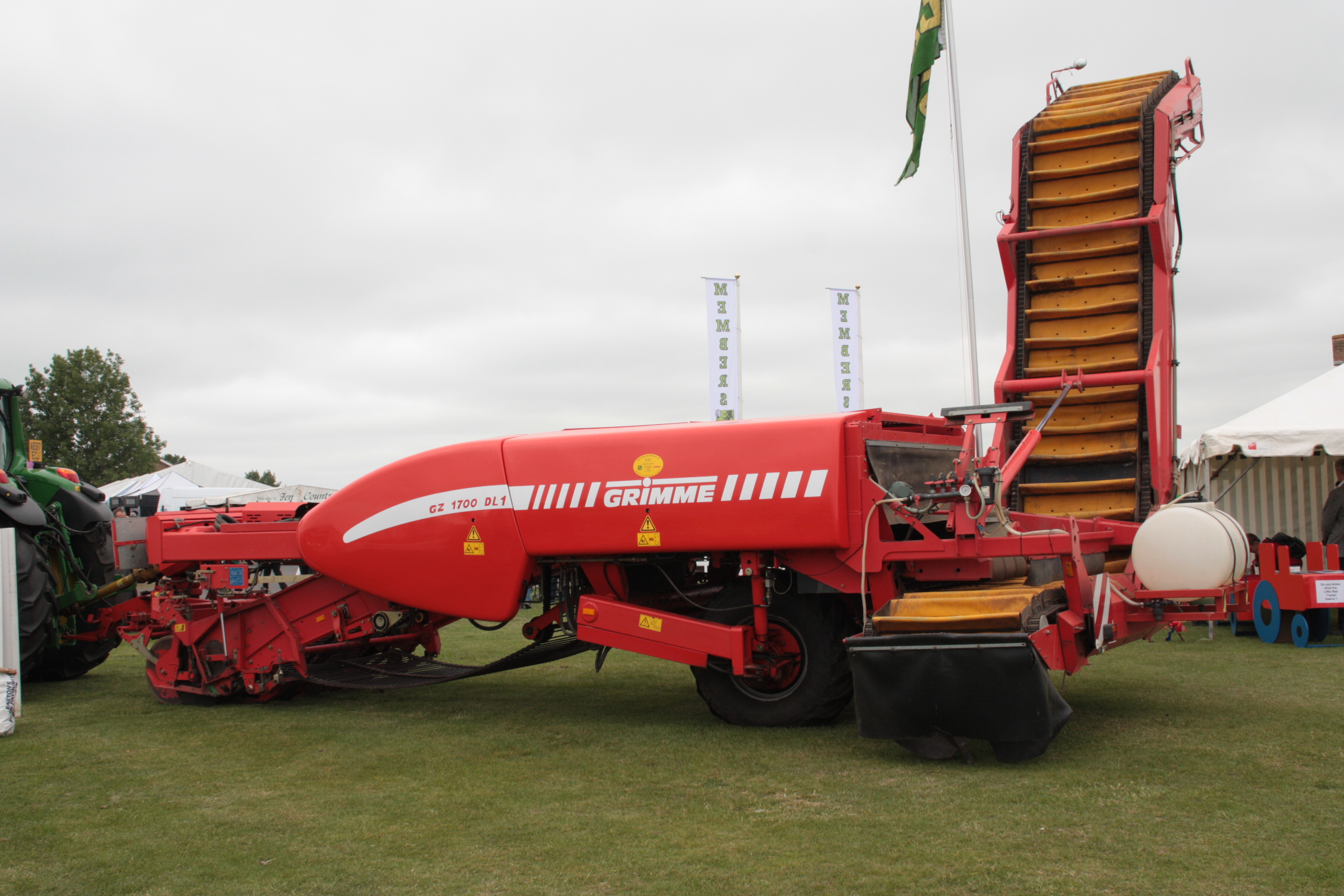
Grimme GZ 1700 DL 1 potato harvester on display at the East of England Show, 2010

The showground was owned by the East of England Agricultural Society, formed in 1970 by the merger of several agricultural societies. Until 2012, it was the organiser of the East of England Show held each year at the showground.

== East of England Arena and Events Centre ==
The East of England Arena and Events Centre hosts an array of various events throughout the year, including music and comedy events, exhibitions, trade fairs, vehicle shows, weddings and festivals.

== Speedway stadium (East of England Arena) ==
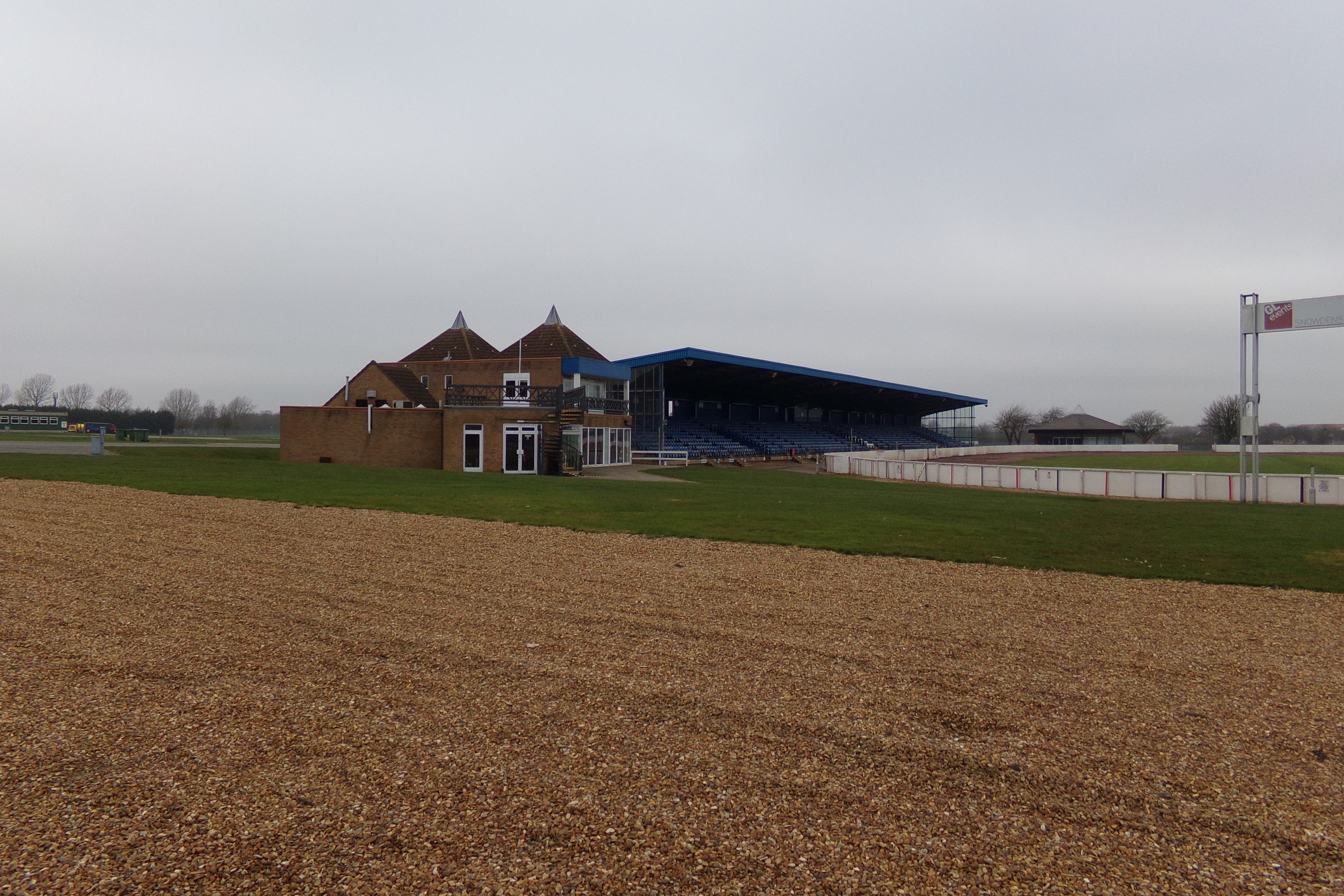
The main stand of the stadium

The Showground was the home of the Peterborough Panthers speedway team who raced in the SGB Premiership, the highest level of Speedway in the United Kingdom. The track was 336 metres (367 yards) long and the stadium had a 2,200 capacity grandstand along with grass banking on the back straight. The track record of 57.4 seconds was set on 13 May 2019 by Danny King.

=== History ===
The venue first hosted speedway on 12 June 1970, when Peterborough competed in their inaugural season 1970 British League Division Two season.

The Peterborough track was also the host of the 2002 Speedway World Cup Final which took place on 10 August. Australia, with Jason Crump, Leigh Adams, Todd Wiltshire, and Peterborough Panthers riders Ryan Sullivan and Jason Lyons, won their second consecutive Speedway World Cup defeating Denmark, Sweden, Poland and the Czech Republic. The Showground also hosted the 2001 Under-21 World Championship final won by Poland's Dawid Kujawa.

In 2022, by the owners Asset Earning Power Group (AEPG) that Arena would undergo redevelopment, which would include demolition of the grandstand and speedway track. The 2023 season was the last season for Peterborough Panthers at the showground, and the club disbanded.

== See also ==
- Peterborough Panthers
