= 2001 Speedway Under-21 World Championship =

European motorcycle speedway event

World Under-21 Championship
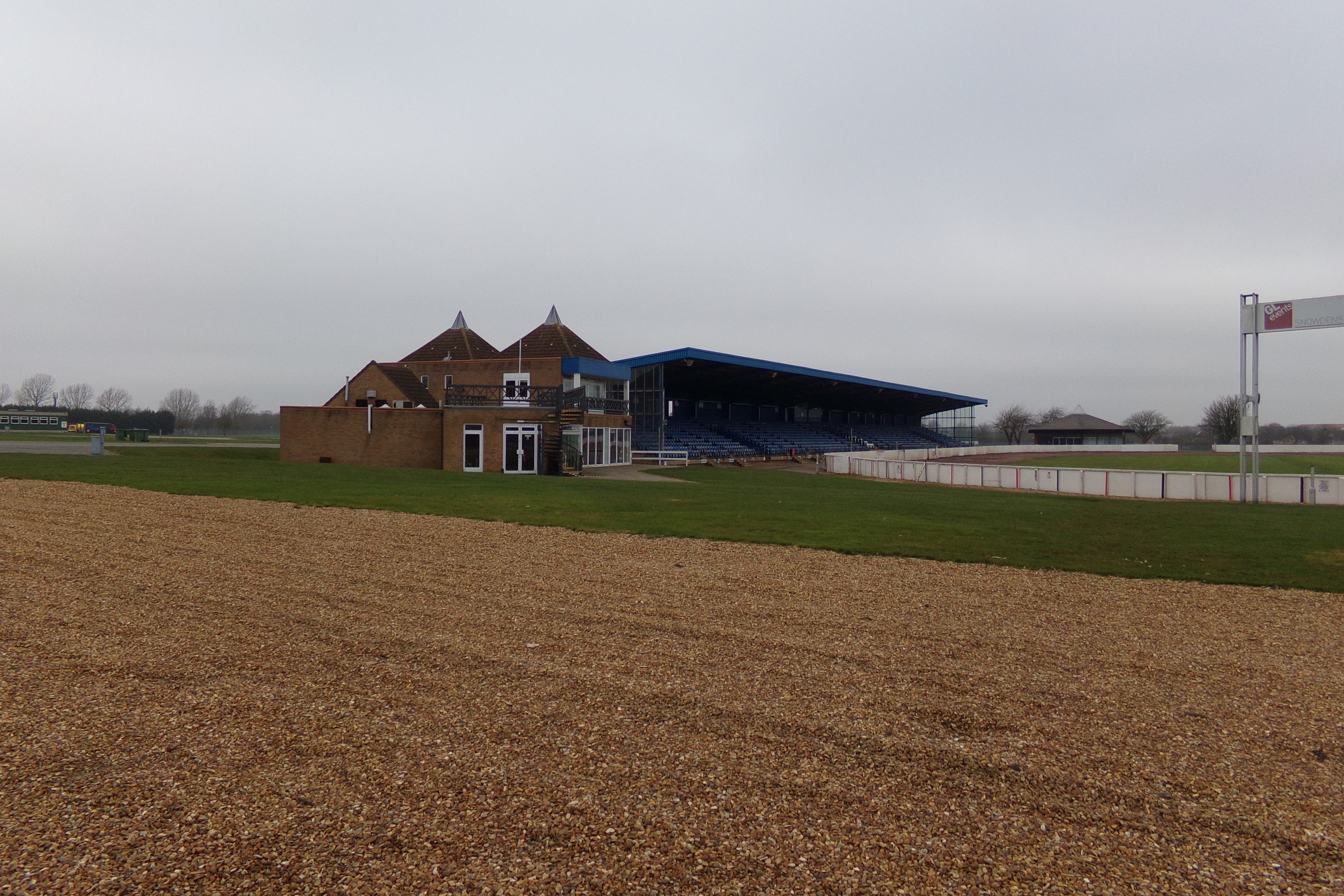
- The East of England Arena
- Venue: East of England Showground
- Location: Peterborough, England
- Start date: 26 August 2001

The 2001 Individual Speedway Junior World Championship was the 25th edition of the World motorcycle speedway Under-21 Championships.

The final took place on 26 August, to determine the champion. The final was won by Dawid Kujawa who qualified for the Speedway Grand Prix Challenge (a qualifying event for the 2002 Speedway Grand Prix) but he became injured and his place was taken by the runner-up Lukáš Dryml. Dryml eventually qualified for the 2002 Speedway Grand Prix.

== World final ==
- 26 August 2001
- East of England Showground, Peterborough

Placing	Rider	Total	1	2	3	4	5	6	7	8	9	10	11	12	13	14	15	16	17	18	19	20	Pts	Pos	21
1	(Poland) (1) Dawid Kujawa	12	2				3				2				3				2				12	1	
2	(Czech Republic) (8) Lukáš Dryml	11		0						2			3			3			3				11	2	
3	(Poland) (4) Rafał Okoniewski	10	3							1				0				3				3	10	3	3
4	(Canada) (7) Krzysztof Słaboń	10		3					2					3	2					E			10	4	2
5	(England) (9) Simon Stead	10			2		2						2					2		2			10	5	1
6	(Slovenia) (5) Matej Žagar	8		2			0					1					3					2	8	6	
7	(Sweden) (2) David Ruud	8	1					1				3				2				1			8	7	
8	(England) (15) David Howe	8				1			3			2						1	1				8	8	
9	(Poland) (16) Łukasz Romanek	7				0				3	E						1			3			7	9	
10	(Sweden) (14) Freddie Eriksson	7				2		3					0		1							1	7	10	
11	(Poland) (6) Jarosław Hampel	7		1				2			3							0			1		7	11	
12	(Poland) (13) Roman Chromik	6				3	1							2		0					0		6	12	
13	(Norway) (3) Björn G. Hansen	6	0						1				1				2				2		6	13	
14	(Poland) (12) Tomasz Chrzanowski	4			1					F		0			0						3		4	14	
15	(Poland) (10) Krzysztof Kasprzak	4			3			E						1			0		E				4	15	
16	(Czech Republic) (11) Miroslav Fencl	2			0				0		1					1						0	2	16	
R1	(Denmark) (R1) Hans N. Andersen	0																					0	R1	
R2	(England) (R2) Chris Harris	0																					0	R2	
Placing	Rider	Total	1	2	3	4	5	6	7	8	9	10	11	12	13	14	15	16	17	18	19	20	Pts	Pos	21

m - exclusion for exceeding two minute time allowance • t - exclusion for touching the tapes • x - other exclusion • e - retired or mechanical failure • f - fell • ns - non-starter • nc - non-classify

gate A - inside	gate B	gate C	gate D - outside
