= 1979 Individual Speedway Junior European Championship =

European motorcycle speedway event

European Under-21 Championship
- Venue: Leningrad Speedway Stadium
- Location: Leningrad, Soviet Union
- Start date: 22 July 1979

The 1979 Individual Speedway Junior European Championship was the third edition of the European Under-21 Championships.

The Championship was won by Ron Preston.

== European final ==
- 22 July 1979
- (Soviet Union) Leningrad Speedway Stadium, Leningrad

Placing	Rider	Total	1	2	3	4	5	6	7	8	9	10	11	12	13	14	15	16	17	18	19	20	Pts	Pos
1	(United States) (2) Ron Preston	13	1					3				3				3				3			13	1
2	(Soviet Union) (3) Ayrat Fayzullin	12	3						X				3				3				3		12	2
3	(Finland) (4) Ari Koponen	11	2							E				3				3				3	11	3
4	(Denmark) (12) Knud Ellegaard	10			3					3		2			X						2		10	4
5	(Sweden) (7) Anders Eriksson	10		1					3					2	2					2			10	5
6	(Czechoslovakia) (1) Stanislav Urban	9	0				2				1				3				3				9	6
7	(Czechoslovakia) (11) Zbyszek Holy	9			X				2		3					2						2	9	7
8	(Norway) (13) Trond Helge Skretting	8				3	3							1		1					X		8	8
9	(Poland) (5) Marek Kępa	6		3			1					0					2					0	6	9
10	(Czechoslovakia) (10) Jaromir Bartoš	6			2			2						0			0		2				6	10
11	(Soviet Union) (16) Vladimir Pankin	6				X				2	2						1			1			6	11
12	(Hungary) (8) Stefan Berecz	5		2						1			1			0			1				5	12
13	(West Germany) (14) Josef Aigner	5				2		1					0		1							1	5	13
14	(Denmark) (15) Hans Albert Klinge	5				1			1			1						2	0				5	14
15	(Sweden) (9) Jan Eriksson	3			1		0						2					E		0			3	15
16	(Italy) (6) Fausto Birbini	1		0				0			0							1			X		1	16
17	(Denmark) (17) Karl Bidesbergh	0																					0	17
18	(West Germany) (18) Kristian Brandt	0																					0	18
Placing	Rider	Total	1	2	3	4	5	6	7	8	9	10	11	12	13	14	15	16	17	18	19	20	Pts	Pos

m - exclusion for exceeding two minute time allowance • t - exclusion for touching the tapes • x - other exclusion • e - retired or mechanical failure • f - fell • ns - non-starter • nc - non-classify

gate A - inside	gate B	gate C	gate D - outside
