= 2015 Speedway Under-21 World Championship =

World motorcycle speedway event

World Under-21 Championship
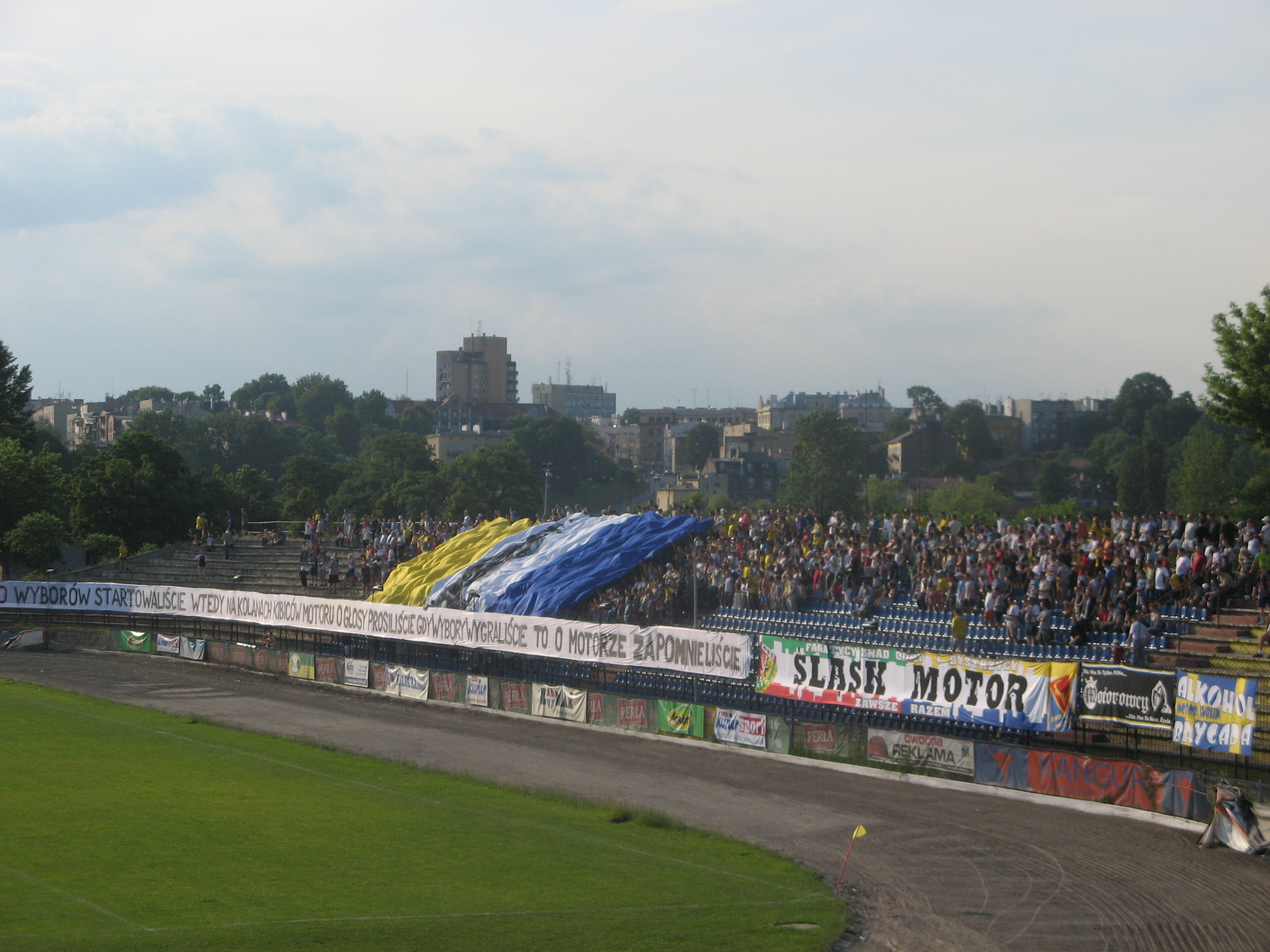
- Lublin hosted round two of the Championship

The 2015 Individual Speedway Junior World Championship was the 39th edition of the FIM World motorcycle speedway Under-21 Championships.

It was staged over three rounds, at Lonigo, Lublin and Pardubice.

The competition was won by Bartosz Zmarzlik, who finished five points ahead of Denmark's Anders Thomsen, despite not winning any of the three rounds to be held. Thomsen finished second after winning a run-off with compatriot Mikkel Michelsen, who won at Lonigo and Pardubice but struggled at Lublin and was unable to catch Zmarzlik, who finished on the podium at each of the rounds. Paweł Przedpełski was the winner on home soil at Lublin.

== Final series ==
No.	Date	Venue	Winner	Runner-up	3rd place
1	11 July	(Italy) Santa Marina Stadium, Lonigo	(Denmark) Mikkel Michelsen	(Poland) Bartosz Zmarzlik	(Denmark) Nikolaj Busk Jakobsen
2	15 August	(Poland) Stadion MOSiR Bystrzyca, Lublin	(Poland) Paweł Przedpełski	(Poland) Bartosz Zmarzlik	(Latvia) Andžejs Ļebedevs
3	19 September	(Czech Republic) Svítkov Stadium, Pardubice	(Denmark) Mikkel Michelsen	(Denmark) Anders Thomsen	(Poland) Bartosz Zmarzlik

== Classification ==
The meeting classification was according to the points scored during the meeting, with the total points scored by each rider during each meeting credited as World Championship points. The FIM Speedway Under 21 World Champion was the rider who collected most World Championship points at the end of the series. In case of a tie between one or more riders in the final overall classification, a run-off decided the 1st, 2nd and 3rd places. For all other placings, the better-placed rider in the last meeting was the better placed rider.

Pos.	Rider	Points	(Italy)	(Poland)	(Czech Republic)
Gold	(Poland) Bartosz Zmarzlik	39	14	12	13
Silver	(Denmark) Anders Thomsen	34	10	11	13
Bronze	(Denmark) Mikkel Michelsen	34	14	6	14
4	(Denmark) Mikkel Bech Jensen	29	10	7	12
5	(Poland) Paweł Przedpełski	29	8	14	7
6	(Australia) Max Fricke	28	10	7	11
7	(Latvia) Andžejs Ļebedevs	24	5	11	8
8	(Australia) Brady Kurtz	22	10	4	8
9	(Sweden) Victor Palovaara	18	8	6	4
10	(Russia) Viktor Kulakov	17	3	10	4
11	(Denmark) Nikolaj Busk Jakobsen	17	11	4	2
12	(United Kingdom) Stefan Nielsen	15	5	6	4
13	(Russia) Valentin Grobauer	14	–	5	9
14	(Denmark) Emil Grøndal	12	6	3	3
15	(Poland) Maksym Drabik	10	–	10	–
16	(Czech Republic) Zdeněk Holub	5	–	–	5
17	(Italy) Michele Paco Castagna	4	4	–	–
18	(Czech Republic) Eduard Krčmář	3	–	–	3
19	(Italy) Nicolas Vicentin	2	2	–	–
20	(Germany) Michael Hartel	2	–	2	–
21	(Poland) Adrian Cyfer	1	–	1	–
22	(Ukraine) Aleksandr Loktaev	0	0	–	–

== See also ==
- 2015 Speedway Grand Prix
- 2015 Team Speedway Junior World Championship
