= Ron Preston =

American speedway rider

- Born: July 15, 1958 (age 68); Newport Beach, United States
- Nationality: American

Career history
- 1979-1981: Poole Pirates
- 1982: Eastbourne Eagles

Individual honours
- 1979: European Junior Champion

Ronald Nunan Preston (born July 15, 1958) is an American former international motorcycle speedway rider who was the European Junior Champion in 1979. He earned 14 caps for the United States national speedway team.

== Career ==
Born in Newport Beach, California, Preston began his racing career with the Poole Pirates in 1979 and spent two years there before moving to the Eastbourne Eagles in 1982.

Preston was the first American to take part in the World Junior Championships and won the 1979 Individual Speedway Junior European Championship.

Preston was slated to ride in the 1979 Speedway World Pairs Championship Final with Bruce Penhall at the Speedway Center in Vojens, Denmark, after first Kelly Moran had to pull out due to injuries suffered in a practice crash and the Moran's replacement Steve Gresham failed to arrive. However, Preston was left stranded at Heathrow Airport in London, England, and could not make it to Denmark in time, which forced Penhall to ride the Pairs Final alone. won silver medals with the USA team at the 1980 and 1981 Speedway World Team Cup.

Preston retired from the sport at the end of the 1982 season due to a friend's death.

== Personal life ==
Preston has two children.

== World Final appearances ==
=== World Team Cup ===
- 1980 - (Poland) Wrocław, Olympic Stadium (with Bruce Penhall / Scott Autrey / Dennis Sigalos / Bobby Schwartz) – 2nd – 29pts (0)
