= 1982 Individual Speedway Junior European Championship =

European motorcycle speedway event

European Under-21 Championship
- Venue: Rottalstadion
- Location: Pocking, West Germany
- Start date: 18 July 1982

The 1982 Individual Speedway Junior European Championship was the sixth edition of the European Under-21 Championships.

The Championship was won by Toni Kasper with 14 points, Mark Courtney defeated Peter Ravn in a run-off for silver.

== European final ==
- 18 July 1982
- (West Germany) Rottalstadion, Pocking

Placing	Rider	Total	1	2	3	4	5	6	7	8	9	10	11	12	13	14	15	16	17	18	19	20	Pts	Pos	21
1	(Czechoslovakia) (7) Toni Kasper	14		3					3					2	3					3			14	1	
2	(England) (15) Mark Courtney	12				3			2			2						3	2				12	2	3
3	(Denmark) (13) Peter Ravn	12				2	3							2		3					2		12	3	2
4	(United States) (3) Lance King	11	2						E				3				3				3		11	4	
5	(Denmark) (5) Jan O. Pedersen	10		2			1					3					2					2	10	5	
6	(Hungary) (6) Zoltan Hajdu	9		0				3			3							2			1		9	6	
7	(Soviet Union) (4) Oleg Volokhov	9	3							1				1				1				3	9	7	
8	(Denmark) (8) John Jørgensen	9		1						3			2			2			1				9	8	
9	(New Zealand) (1) David Bargh	8	F				0				2				3				3				8	9	
10	(Italy) (11) Giorgio Zaramella	6			3				1		1					0						1	6	10	
11	(Hungary) (9) Zoltán Adorján	6			2		2						0					F		2			6	11	
12	(West Germany) (12) Georg Greif	4			1					2		0			1						0		4	12	
13	(Soviet Union) (2) Vladimir Trofimov	4	1					0				1				1				1			4	13	
14	(West Germany) (10) Klaus Lausch	3			0			2						0			1		E				3	14	
15	(Denmark) (14) Brian Jacobsen	3				1		1					1		F							0	3	15	
16	(Hungary) (16) Sandor Tihanyi	0				0				0	F						0			0			0	16	
17	(Denmark) (17) Kent Noer	0																					0	17	
18	(Czechoslovakia) (18) Petr Kubíček	0																					0	18	
Placing	Rider	Total	1	2	3	4	5	6	7	8	9	10	11	12	13	14	15	16	17	18	19	20	Pts	Pos	21

m - exclusion for exceeding two minute time allowance • t - exclusion for touching the tapes • x - other exclusion • e - retired or mechanical failure • f - fell • ns - non-starter • nc - non-classify

gate A - inside	gate B	gate C	gate D - outside
