= Sean Courtney =

British motorcycle speedway rider

- Born: 15 September 1964 (age 62); Braintree, Essex, England
- Nationality: British (English)

Career history
- 1982–1985, 1993: Edinburgh Monarchs
- 1985–1989: Berwick Bandits
- 1990–1991, 1994–1995, 1997–2000: Glasgow Tigers
- 1992: Rye House Rockets
- 1996–1997: Belle Vue Aces

Team honours
- 1994: League champion (tier 2)
- 1989, 1994: Knockout Cup (tier 2)

Sean Joseph Courtney (born 15 September 1964) is a former motorcycle speedway rider from England.

== Biography ==
Courtney, born in Braintree, Essex, began his British leagues career riding for Edinburgh Monarchs during the 1982 National League season and made his debut at the age of 17-years-old.

The following season, Courtney began to ride regularly for the Monarchs, improving his average to 6.00 by the end of the 1984 season.

In 1985, Courtney switched clubs after signing for the Berwick Bandits. He would spend five seasons at Berwick from 1985 to 1989 and was joined at the club in 1988 by his brother Mark Courtney. Together they would help the Bandits win the Knockout Cup in 1989, defeating Poole Pirates in the final.

At the start of the 1990 National League season, Courtney signed for Glasgow Tigers, where he rode for the Scottish club for two seasons before competing for Rye House Rockets in 1992 and his former club Edinburgh in 1993.

It was the decision to re-sign for Glasgow for the 1994 season that wrote Courtney's name in the Glasgow Tigers history because he was part of the team that achieved the 'double double' (the league and cup double for two consecutive seasons) in 1994.

After a season with Belle Vue Aces in the 1996 top division, Courtney returned once again to Glasgow, where he saw out his career from 1997 until 2000. During his last season (2000) his brother Mark and nephew Scott Courtney both rode in the same team Glasgow team.

== Family ==
Courtney's brother Mark and nephews Jamie and Scott Courtney were all professional speedway riders.
