= Jamie Courtney =

English speedway rider

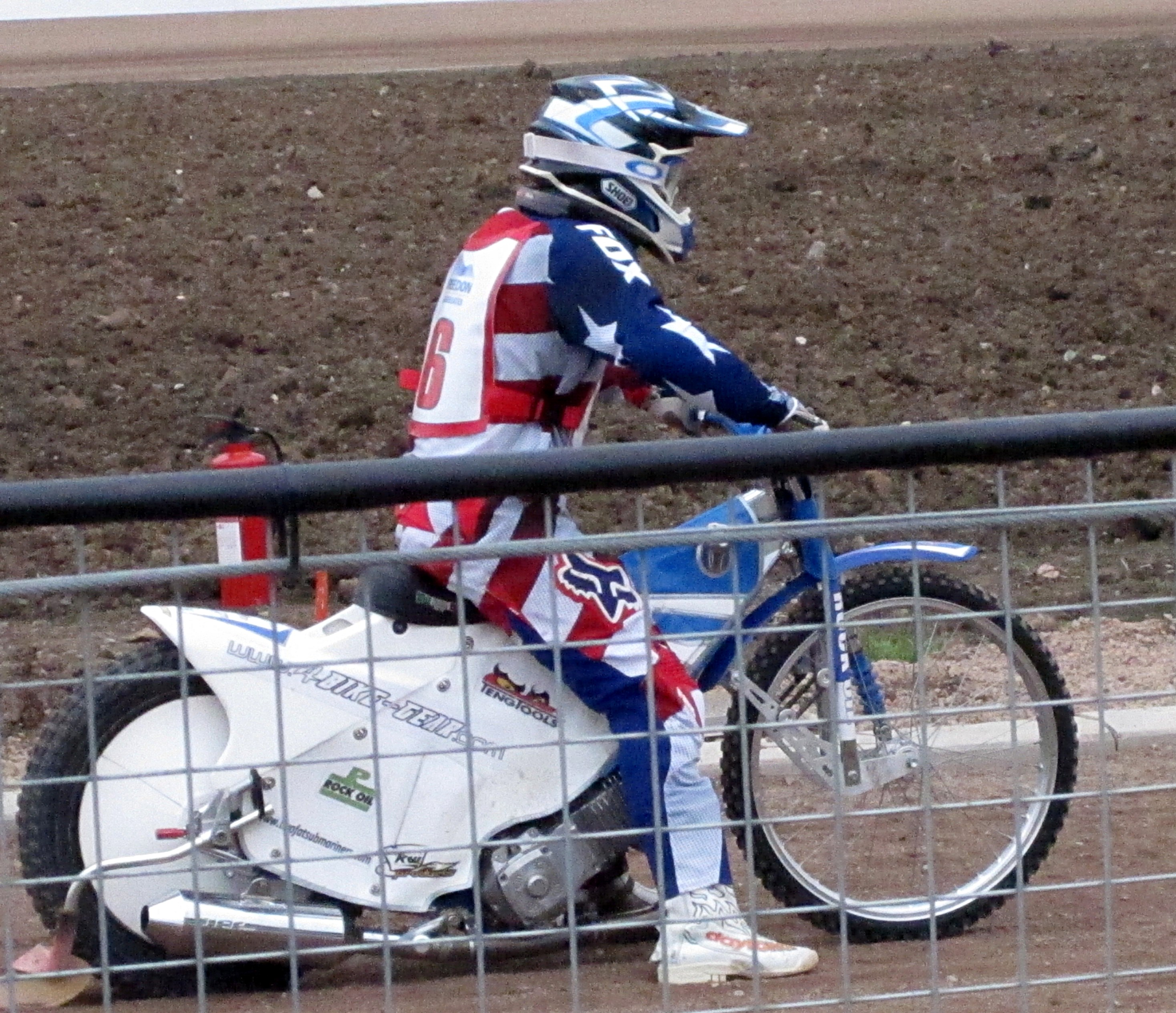
- Born: 22 April 1988 (age 38); Ashington, Northumberland, England
- Nationality: British (English)
- Website: www.courtneyracing.co.uk

Career history
- 2003: Rye House Rockets
- 2004: Oxford
- 2010: Glasgow Tigers
- 2010: King's Lynn Stars
- 2011: Leicester Lions
- 2011: Dudley Heathens

Jamie Mark Courtney (born 22 April 1988, in Ashington, Northumberland) is a former motorcycle speedway rider and current promoter from England.

== Career ==
Courtney comes from a speedway family; His brother Scott and uncle Sean Courtney were both speedway riders before him, and his father Mark Courtney is a former England international. In 2002, he became British under-15 champion. He competed at the age of fifteen for Rye House Rockets, and the following year rode for Oxford Silver Machine Academy. He has also raced for Redcar Bears, Isle of Wight Islanders, and Workington Comets.

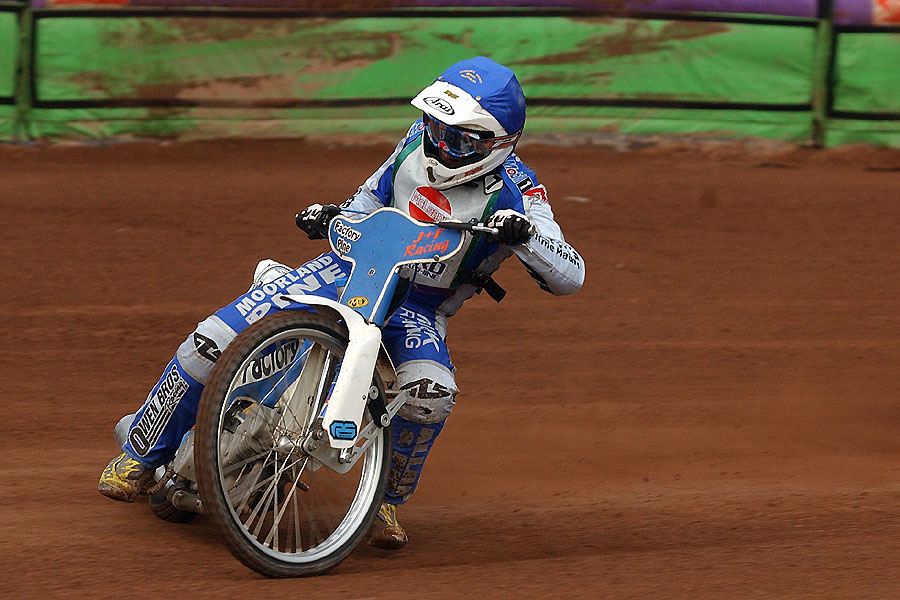
Courtney riding for Oxford juniors in 2004

In 2010, Courtney rode for Glasgow Tigers on loan from King's Lynn Stars before returning to ride for King's Lynn towards the end of the season. In 2010, he signed for Leicester Lions, the team that his father rode for 126 times, for their return to speedway in the Premier League. After being released by Leicester mid-season, he later joined National League team Dudley Heathens.

== Management ==
In 2021, it was announced that Courtney would be the team promoter of the Oxford Cheetahs during 2022, who were returning to action at Sandy Lane for the first time since 2007.
