= 2018 Speedway Under-21 World Championship =

World motorcycle speedway event

World Under-21 Championship
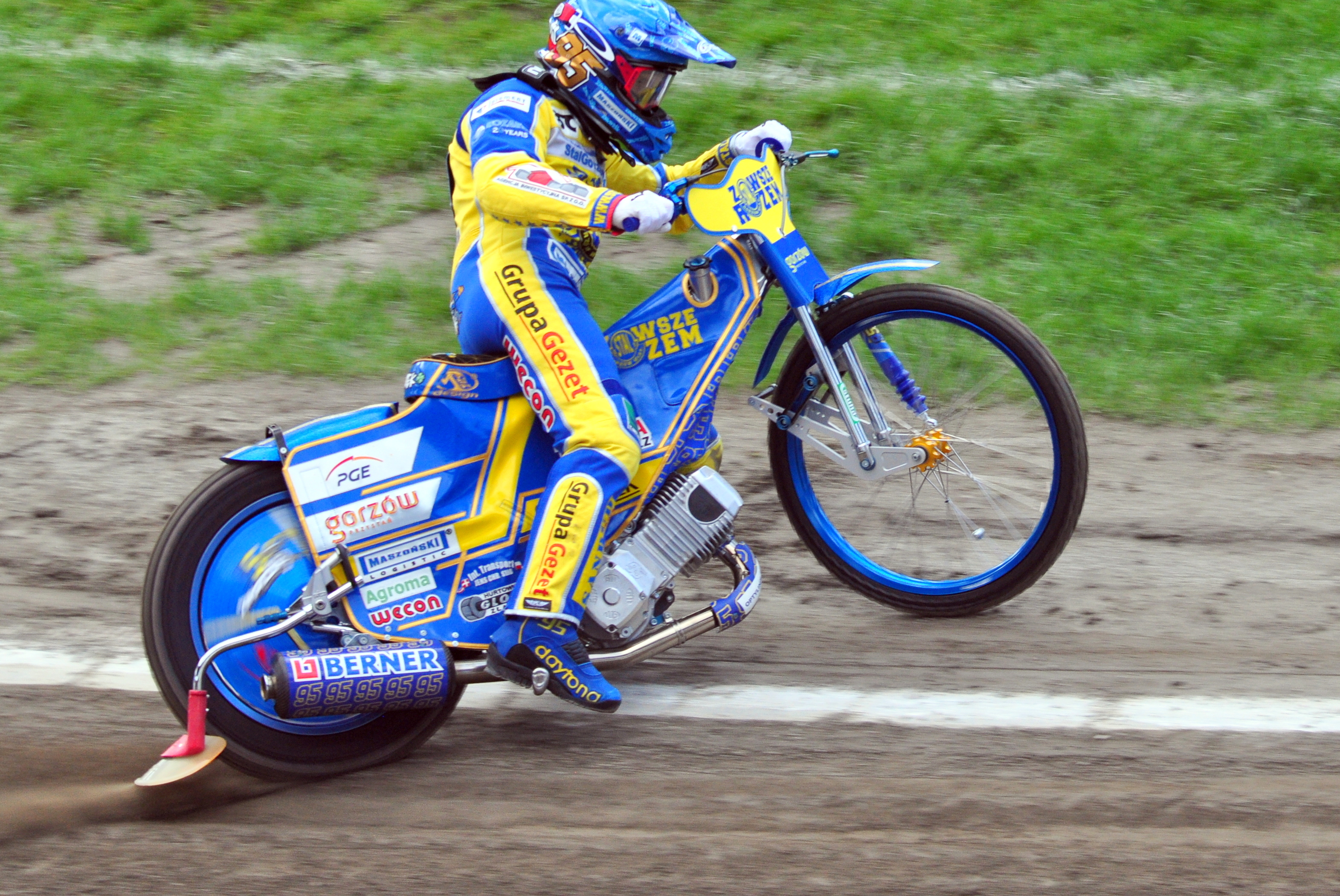
- Bartosz Zmarzlik

The 2018 Individual Speedway Under 21 World Championship was the 42nd edition of the FIM Individual Under-21 World Championship and was staged over three rounds, at Daugavpils, Leszno and Pardubice. Poland's Maksym Drabik was the defending champion having won the title in 2017.

== Result ==
The title was won by Bartosz Smektała, who beat Drabik by two points. Smektała had trailed Drabik heading into the final round, however he scored a 21-point maximum to take the title. Great Britain's Robert Lambert took bronze.

== Final series ==
No.	Date	Venue	Winner	Runner-up	3rd place
1	29 June	(Latvia) Stadium Lokomotīve, Daugavpils	(Poland) Maksym Drabik	(England) Robert Lambert	(Poland) Bartosz Smektała
2	22 July	(Poland) Alfred Smoczyk Stadium, Leszno	(Poland) Maksym Drabik	(Poland) Bartosz Smektała	(England) Dan Bewley
3	18 September	(Czech Republic) Svítkov Stadium, Pardubice	(Poland) Bartosz Smektała	(England) Robert Lambert	(Poland) Dominik Kubera

== Classification ==
The meeting classification was according to the points scored during the meeting, with the total points scored by each rider during each meeting credited as World Championship points. The FIM Speedway Under 21 World Champion was the rider who collected most World Championship points at the end of the series. In case of a tie between one or more riders in the final overall classification, a run-off decided the 1st, 2nd and 3rd places. For all other placings, the better-placed rider in the last meeting was the better placed rider.

Pos.	Rider	Points	(Latvia)	(Poland)	(Czech Republic)
Gold	(Poland) Bartosz Smektała	56	17	18	21
Silver	(Poland) Maksym Drabik	54	20	21	13
Bronze	(England) Robert Lambert	48	17	13	18
4	(Poland) Dominik Kubera	37	12	13	12
5	(Denmark) Andreas Lyager	29	7	10	12
6	(Denmark) Frederik Jakobsen	25	11	5	9
7	(Denmark) Patrick Hansen	25	7	8	10
8	(England) Dan Bewley	21	7	14	–
9	(Poland) Daniel Kaczmarek	15	8	5	2
10	(Poland) Robert Chmiel	15	1	3	11
11	(Sweden) Joel Kling	14	6	8	–
11	(Latvia) Oļegs Mihailovs	12	12	–	–
12	(Slovenia) Nick Škorja	12	3	5	4
13	(Poland) Wiktor Lampart	9	–	9	–
14	(Sweden) Filip Hjelmland	9	4	5	–
15	(Russia) Gleb Chugunov	7	–	–	7
16	(Latvia) Davis Kurmis	7	0	1	6
17	(Latvia) Artem Trofimov	5	5	–	–
18	(Czech Republic) Jan Kvěch	5	–	–	5
19	(Germany) Daniel Spiller	5	–	0	5
20	(Czech Republic) Filip Hájek	3	1	–	2
21	(Czech Republic) Petr Chlupáč	1	–	–	1
22	(Latvia) Ernest Matjuszonoks	0	0	–	–
23	(Czech Republic) Patrik Mikel	0	–	–	0

== See also ==
- 2018 Speedway Grand Prix
- 2018 Team Speedway Junior World Championship
