= Norway national under-21 speedway team =

National motorsports team

Norway
- Association: Norwegian Motorsport Federation; Norges Motorsportforbund
- FIM code: NMF

World Championships
Team U-21	—	—	—
Individual U-21	—	1	1
- Best result: 2nd - Rune Holta (1994)

The Norway national under-21 speedway team is the national under-21 motorcycle speedway team of Norway and is controlled by the Norwegian Motorsport Federation. The team took part in the Under-21 World Cup for the first and only time in 2005. Rune Holta won two medals in Individual competition (silver in 1994 and bronze in 1993).

== Competition ==
Team Speedway Junior World Championship
Year	Place	Pts.	Riders
2005	—	—	3rd place in Qualifying Round Two; Rune Sola (10+F), Jan Mikke Bjerk (9), Carl Johan Raugstad (6), Remu Ueland (2), Emil Omsland (1)
2006–2009			Did not enter

== See also ==
- Norway national speedway team
