= Dawid Kujawa =

Polish speedway rider (born 1981)

- Born: 13 April 1981 (age 45); Zielona Góra, Poland
- Nationality: Polish

Career history

Poland
- 1998: Opole
- 1999-2002: Zielona Góra
- 2003: WKM Warszawa

Great Britain
- 2004: Newport Wasps

Sweden
- 2006: Kaparna

Individual honours
- 2001: World Under 21 Champion

Team honours
- 2000, 2002: Polish Division Two Champion

Dawid Kujawa (born 13 April 1981 in Zielona Góra, Poland) is a former speedway rider from Poland.

== Career ==
In 2001, Kujawa finished first in the World Under-21 Championship.

Kujawa rode for the Newport Wasps in the United Kingdom in 2004 but quit after just one meeting, following a meeting with the Newport promoter Tim Stone.

== Honours ==
=== World Under-21 Championship ===
- 2001 - World Champion (12 points)

=== Polish Under-21 Pairs Championship ===
- 2001 - Polish Champion
- 2002 - 2nd place

=== Silver Helmet (U-21) ===
- 2001 - 3rd place

== See also ==
- Poland speedway team
