= Mark Courtney =

British motorcycle speedway rider

- Born: 25 March 1961 (age 65); Braintree, Essex
- Nationality: British (English)

Career history
- 1978: Furness Flyers
- 1979–1981, 1986, 1993: Middlesbrough Tigers/Bears
- 1980–1983: Leicester Lions
- 1984, 1986: Belle Vue Aces
- 1985: King's Lynn Stars
- 1987: Newcastle Diamonds
- 1988–1990: Berwick Bandits
- 1991, 2000, 2001: Glasgow Tigers
- 1992, 2002, 2003: Rye House Rockets
- 2001: Trelawny Tigers

Individual honours
- 1980: British Junior Champion
- 1982: European U-21 silver

Team honours
- 1981: National League Champion
- 1980: National League Pairs Champion
- 1986: National League Fours Champion

Mark Vincent Courtney (born 25 March 1961) is a former motorcycle speedway rider from England, who rode in the British League for several teams between 1978 and 2003. He earned five international caps for the England national speedway team.

== Biography ==
Courtney was born in Braintree, Essex in 1961 and moved with his family to Workington when he was twelve, and he began his speedway career with second-half races at Workington in 1977. He joined the Barrow team in the National League the following year, moving to Middlesbrough Tigers in 1979.

Courtney won the British Junior Championship in 1980 and moved up to the British League on loan with the Leicester Lions the same year, splitting his time between the two leagues. Also in 1980, he won the National League Pairs, partnering Steve Wilcock for Middlesbrough, during the 1980 National League season.

In 1982, Courtney moved to Leicester full-time after a £15,000 transfer, and in the same year finished as runner-up in the European Under-21 final, defeating Peter Ravn in a run-off for silver.

In 1983, Courtney was the Lions' highest-average rider, and represented England four times. At the end of the 1983 season, Courtney requested a transfer and signed to ride for the Belle Vue Aces in 1984, and then King's Lynn Stars in 1985.

In 1986, Courtney dropped back down to the National League with Middlesbrough, while also making fifteen appearances for Belle Vue. He helped the Middlesbrough win the Fours Championship during the 1986 National League season.

A successful three-year spell at Berwick between 1988 and 1990 was followed by seasons at Glasgow, Rye House and then Middlesbrough. Courtney was sacked by Middlesbrough at the end of the 1993 season after an incident involving a fire extinguisher at a hotel in Swindon. This effectively triggered his retirement from the sport, Courtney later moving into the building trade.

After being arrested in May 1997, Courtney was sentenced to six years in prison in 1998 for his part in a plot to import cannabis with a street value of £500,000 into the UK.

After seven years away from racing, Courtney, released from prison on licence, returned in 2000 with Glasgow, moving on to Trelwany midway through 2001. He moved on to his final club, Rye House, in 2002, finally retiring at the end of the 2003 season, after which he became a mechanic, most notably for Chris Harris.

== Family ==
Courtney's sons Scott and Jamie Courtney followed him into speedway, both of whom went on to manage speedway teams. Mark Courtney's brother Sean Courtney also rode from 1982 to 2000.
