= Rafał Karczmarz =

Polish speedway rider

- Born: 25 February 1999 (age 27); Gorzów Wielkopolski, Poland
- Nationality: Polish

Career history

Poland
- 2015: Piła
- 2016, 2023–2024: Rzeszów
- 2016-2021: Gorzów
- 2021: Poznań
- 2022: Krosno

Sweden
- 2022: Vargarna

Team honours
- 2017, 2018: World U23 Team Championship

Rafał Karczmarz (born 25 February 1999) is an international speedway rider from Poland.

== Speedway career ==
Karczmarz came to prominence in 2016 and 2017, when he was part of the Polish team that won the Team Speedway Junior European Championship. He then went on to win the 2017 World U23 Team Championship. The following year, in 2018, he repeated the achievement.

During 2022, Karczmarz rode for Krosno in the Ekstraliga and Vargarna in the Elitserien.
