= Maksym Drabik =

Polish speedway rider

- Born: 22 February 1998 (age 28); Częstochowa, Poland
- Nationality: Polish

Career history

Poland
- 2017–2020: Wrocław
- 2022: Lublin
- 2023–2024: Czestochowa
- 2025: Rybnik

Sweden
- 2017–2019, 2022: Lejonen
- 2023–2025: Smederna

Individual honours
- 2017, 2019: World Under-21 Champion

Maksym Drabik (born 22 February 1998) is an international speedway rider from Poland.

== Speedway career ==
Drabik won the gold medal at the World Under-21 Championship in the 2017 Individual Speedway Junior World Championship and the 2019 Individual Speedway Junior World Championship.

In 2021, Drabik was banned for breaking anti-doping rules (vitamin injection) by the Polish Doping Agency, the ban was back dated from 30 October 2020 (when he was initially suspended) to the 30 October 2021. In 2022, he helped Lublin win the 2022 Ekstraliga.

== World final appearances ==
=== World Under-21 Championship ===
- 2015 - 15th - 10pts
- 2016 - =21st - 0pts
- 2017 - 1st - 49pts
- 2018 - 2nd - 54pts
- 2019 - 1st - 49pts

== Family ==
His father Sławomir Drabik was also a Polish international speedway rider.
