= Bartosz Smektała =

Polish speedway rider

- Born: 22 August 1998 (age 28); Śrem, Poland
- Nationality: Polish

Career history

Poland
- 2014–2020, 2023–2024: Leszno
- 2021–2022: Częstochowa
- 2025: Poznań

Sweden
- 2018, 2022–2025: Västervik

Denmark
- 2024: Fjelsted
- 2025: Grindsted

Individual honours
- 2018: World Under-21 Champion

Team honours
- 2025: Swedish champions

Bartosz Smektała (born 22 August 1998) is an international speedway rider from Poland.

== Speedway career ==
Smektała won the gold medal at the World Under-21 Championship in the 2018 World Under-21 Championship.

Smektała rode in the Team Speedway Polish Championship for Unia Leszno and Włókniarz Częstochowa. In September 2024, he signed for PSŻ Poznań for the 2025 season.

In 2025, Smektała helped Västervik win the Elitserien.

== World final appearances ==
=== World Under-21 Championship ===
- 2016 - 13th - 16pts
- 2017 - 2nd - 42pts
- 2018 - 1st - 56pts
- 2019 - 2nd - 45pts
